= List of villages in Ondo State =

This is a list of villages and settlements in Ondo State, Nigeria organised by local government area (LGA) and district/area (with postal codes also given).

== By postal code ==
LGA	District / Area	Postal code	Villages
Akoko North East	Akunnu/Isowopo	342106	Akunnu; Auga; Iboropa; Ikakumo; Ise
Akoko North East	Ikare (Rural)	342101	Ikare; Ugbe
Akoko North West	Ajowa	342105	Ajowa; Eriti; Gedegede; Igasi; Oge; Oyin
Akoko North West	Arigidi (Rural)	342102	Arigidi; Iye
Akoko North West	Irun/Surulere	342103	Ese; Igbooji; Irun; Italeto; Kajola Camp; Ogbagi; Ojeka; Surulere
Akoko North West	Oke Agbe	342104	Afa; Afin; Aje; Ase; Erusu; Ibaram; Ido; Ikaram; Iyani; Oke-Agbe; Oye; Oyin
Akoko South East	Epinmi-Akoko	342108	Epinmi-Akoko
Akoko South East	Ifira-Akoko	342115	Ayegunle; Ikun-Akoko
Akoko South East	Ipe Akoko	342110	Ipe-Akoko
Akoko South East	Isua-Akoko	342109	Isua-Akoko
Akoko South East	Sosan-Akoko	342113	Sosan-Akoko
Akoko South West	Akungba Akoko	342111	Akunagba-Akoko; Etioro
Akoko South West	Oba-Akoko	342116	Ago Ajayi; Ago Ojo; Ago Oka; Ose-Oba
Akoko South West	Oka Akoko	342107	Alegunle; Iwaro; Oka-Akoko
Akoko South West	Supare Akoko	342117	Abulenla; Ago Flower; Ago-Orikuta; Igboegun; Igbonla
Akure North	Aiyede-Ogbese	340106	Ago Oyinbo; Alayere; Ayunla; Ilu Abo; Kajola
Akure North	Iju/Ita Ogbolu (Rural)	340104	Abusoro; Agamo; Ago Egbira; Amosi; Aresun; Igbogede; Iju (340105); Ilado; Ipole Irado; Odudu
Akure North	Oba-Ile	340102	Araromi; Bolorunduro; Eleyewo; Owode
Akure South	Igba -Toro	340101	Alasoadura; Aponmu; Awule; Eleyowo; Igbatoro Femilugba; Igoba; Isinigbo; Ita-Oniyan; Iwoye; Osi
Akure South	Oda	340103	Adejubu; Ajagbusi; Emilolo; Ilekun; Isagba; Olokuta; Onipanu
Ese Odo	Arogbo II	352107	Abedingo; Abere; Adanu-Gbini; Adoloseimo I; Adoloseimo IV; Adoloseimo V; Agadagba Obon; Agbedigbalan; Ainromozion; Ajapa Community; Akonkotughu; Akpata; Amalaita Zion; Amatibo Zion; Asenebuboghoana Zion; Ashingbene; Asigborodo; Bobougbini Okegbini; Bolowoghu Community; Community; Dababulebu; Dababulebu Zion; Damugbene; Dedobogha-Zion; Dibigbini; Ebibotei Zion; Ebiwegboni; Egbeghebini; Fiyebrasinitei; Gbarangbini; Gbiniweigbin; Igaligangbo; Iganbo; Ijoujou Kubu; Ipiteikiri; Itaita Igbin; Itebuagbini; Itekungbin; Jabegbini; Janegbini; Jeribeni; Karagbini; Karigbin; Keribeni; Kokotoru; Latalie; Lupougbo; Mobiremigbini; New Ajapa; Oboroghini Amelica; Ogbnogologbini; Ogidigba I; Ogidigba II; Ogokiri Zion; Okaminiwei; Okegbini; Okorobobigbini; Opuba Community; Opugbini; Osaki; Otuwokubu; Pankuno; Pelebosou; Pinaama Zion; Pubalebu; Pububogho Zion; Pubulebu; S.K. Zionimi; Tamalaubotei Zion; Temesokogbini; Tolu-Kiribo; Tuwegbini; Ugbobeimo; Upe Community; Urousoama; Uyakumogbini; Wotimigbinin; Zion; Amapere
Ese Odo	Arogbo IV	352109	Adoloseimo II; Adoloseimo III; Adumu-Uba; Agbedigbaran; Aserejugbini; Biagbini; Gboinbo; Itaita; Kurukurugbini; Lalatie; Ogidigba; Okorobobi; Pankumo; Ugbobeimo
Ese Odo	Babomi	352114	Ajagba Village; Ajalere; Akpoweri; Anthony; Araromi; Augustine Camp; Benjamin; Calabar Camp; Christopher; David's Camp; Ehin Ofe; Emomo; Eyo; Ezekiel Camp; French Village; Friday Camp; Giwa; Hitler Camp; House of God's Camp; Idiatala; Idogho; Igberaja Camp; Igirikile; Igwe Camp; Johnson; Joseph Camp; Karimu Camp; Katangar camp; Korefe; Matulu; Memigbere; Memorigha; Mukoro Osanyin; Obadiah Camp; Obakaako; Obasemo (Oberemo); Ofineme; Oginiji; Okorogbhene; Omi Pupuru; Omisesi; Pateko; Rujere; Sabomi; Yerighebe
Ese Odo	Igbekebo	352110	Abadi Pekagha; Abariko; Aghaje(Aghejo/Akaba); Aghansue; Ago Eyin; Ago Lagos; Ago Moses Isiaka; Ago Oghebor; Ago Thompson; Akorin; Aluju Ibila Camp; Arulewo; Bannard Umokoro Camp; Butoru; Dele Richard Camp; Emewu Camp; Falomo/Labour Camp/Bejowa; Gbafenfen; Igangbo; Igbekebo; James Umiaghe Camp; James Umokoro Camp; Kajola; Kateri (Katuru); Kelekele; Kosoko; Lupogbo; Mete Joseph Camp; Metiala; Micheal Edo Camp; Mogboju; Mrs Iji Camp; Niwari; Noble Camp; Oba Egbukuyomi Camp; Obateru Camp; Ojarigho Camp; Okoloko; Okoto Lekki; Olisa (Oliseh); Olorugun; Orita Joseph; Oruda; Osari; Pa Emi's Camp; Tamuke; Teji Sheile Camp; Uba; Ugbo Yagha; Ugbonla Zion Igbekebo; White Sand Zion Igbekebo
Ese Odo	Inikorogha	352112	Dina Camp; Dododo; Doro; Ebiniza; Epin Camp; Fia; Gbenebo; Igbekeji; Igbini Omi (Igbene Omi) Camp; Inikorogha; Kurughene; Maseye; Okoro Camp; Okuleluju; Olorunleke; Omiyetuse; Orita Thompson; Osobu; Suopopagha; Thompson Camp; Torukoba Camp; Yanyanghan
Ese Odo	Kiribo	352115	Ago Alaguntan; Ago Gee; Ago Gee Akubo; Ago Ogunmahin; Ago Rowolo; Ago Williams; Akaraba; Akporido; Aphiande; Apogidi; Aye Abasa; Bintolu; Ekpu Camp; Ekundayo I; Ekundayo II; Gbeleju Ode; Gbeleju Oke; Gege; George; Gurame; Ibugbe Alafian; Ikusedun; Ishiekuene; Ita Ibale; Iwanefun; Jegun Camp; John Jele; Kalariju; Kasipere; Kemere; Kiribo; Leven; Lupogbo Kiribo; Mabene; Maclean; Mawanami; Mene Bambe; Moju; Monebi; Oburuku; Ogundowo; Ogunye I; Ogunyo II; Oharisi; Ojigbegbini; Okerojaye; Okoko; Olaposi; Oluku; Omefon; Omenigho II; Omonigho II; Omonira; Opotuo; Oronla; Orunde; Polugbene Ogun; Sea Camp; Senghemi; Tebuju; Yasere
Ese Odo	Ojuala	352111	Adebayo Camp; Ago Kusedun; Ago Weghan; Anifowose; Calabar Camp I-V; Igo Ilaje; Ita Oluwa Camp; Ita Opoto; Jinrongho; Lapomu Camp; Nanahan (Nanaghan); Ojuala; Ojuala Mill; Okitigerege I & II; Olomitutu I & II; Omiorisa; Ugbogi Camp
Ese Odo	Ukparama Ward II /Arogbo III	352108	Agalabotiye; Agalakiri Community; Ajapa-Bilebu; Alagba; Amadumo-Opuba; Arukarabou; Beleu-Amah; Bojito Zion; Dabiyotuboghu; Diadara; Difidinogho; Ebibotei Zion-Opuba; Eere Community; Ekpetonron; Ibakelele Zion; Ishmeal Zion; Majebi Camp; Ojudou-Ama Zion; Oke Oba-Igbo; Okosi-Igbo; Opu-Akpatakubu; Opu-Olubo; Opuba-Igbobemo; Opuba-Kalatubu; Opuba-Ofoghuba; Ori-Oke Zion; Otumara; Sea-water; Songhoron Community; Tabamotimi Camp; Tububiri; Ugobubogho Zion
Ese Odo	UkparamaI I/ Arogbo I	352106	Ajakirigbene; Akina Zion; Asere; Baikiri; Bibokepiri; Demiyen-Gbene; Dinokumo; Epemubou; Gbagi-Gbini; Iyorubugbini; Jongha-Gbini; Katewei-Gbini; Kurukuru-Gbini; Morogbini; Odugba-Gbini; Ogono-Ama Zion; Okirigbo; Opubobuibogho; Opukutugbune; Seisuwogha; Seitipa-Gbini; Sisegbin; Torugbini; Ukpetubu; Yala-Bou
Idanre	Alade	340109	Aboekan; Akindana; Aponmu-Lona; Aseigbo; Geberiwojo; Ikako; Imolumo/Iloro; Ipinlerere; Ipoba 1 & II; Ipoba-Jomu; Itaidorun; Lafere; Lokuta; Meromi; Oike-Anifor; Owena-Ayetoro; Sama; Tejugbola
Idanre	Odoe Idanre	340108	Abababubu; Abalaka; Ago-Joshua; Ajagbusi; Ajebamidele; Ajegunle-Orunbato; Ajipowo Cims &; Akinmoji; Ala-Elefosan; Ala-Goke; Ala-Omiliyan; Aladura; Anukansugba; Apefon; Arapa; Aribigbola; Arisin I & II; Arun; Atosin; Ayede; Ayefemi; Baale Ojumu; Bajare; Daralode; Eripose; Fayomi; Gbalegi; Ido Oshinle; Igbolowowa; Ijama; Iramuji/Agbaje; Ironwon Igbatayo; Irowo-Sasere; Isan Jigbokin; Isurin; Itanarowa/Asoko; Itogun-Adaja; Iwonja; Jingbe; Labuwa; Lisagba; Loagbo; Malan; Meth. High School; Obatedo/Bamotula; Odeja; Odeja Orts II; Odele; Odo-Ewu; Odo-Orisa; Ojadale; Oke-Ala; Okedo -Manare; Omilade-Januyi; Omilifon 1 & 2; Opa/Omiolosun; Owo; Owomofewa; Teniola; Ubi 1 & II; Ugbepo
Idanre	Owena	340107	Apomu; Elebiseghe; Erijo; Esale; Farm Settlement Poun; Jingbe; Jonibola; Ofosu; Oke-Idanre; Omifunfun; Onisere
Ifedore	Igbara-Oke	340113	Amaye; Asae; Ilero; Imokuti; Odo-Oja
Ifedore	Ijare	340111	Ayetoro; Odo-Esi; Ogbontitun; Otalo-Gboido; Post Office Are; Ugoba; Uye
Ifedore	Ilara	340112	Igbehin; Iro; Lare; Odofin
Ifedore	Ipogun	340110	Aaye; Eti Oreseun; Ibule; Ikota; Ipon; Irese; Obo; Ologorere
Ilaje	Aheri Kingdom	352119	Agbala Obi; Agbala Olope Meji; Agerige Zion; Aheri Camp; Ajebamidele; Akata; Ako Ira-Oba; Alape Junction; Araromi Sea-side; Enu-Ama; Idegbele; Idigbengbin; Igogun; Ihapen; Ilefunfun; Ipare; Ipepe; Mofehintokun; Okesiri; Olopo; Temidire; Ubalogun; Zion pepe
Ilaje	Etikan Kingdom	352118	Agba Gana; Ago Apeja; Ago Buli; Ago Egun; Ago Festus; Ago Gbobaniyi; Ago Ijebu; Ago Ikumapayi; Ago Iwabi; Ago Lubi; Ago Oluji; Aiyetitun; Araromi Etikan; Igbobi; Ikaji Etikan; Moborode; Obalende Etikan; Ode Etikan; Oja Igo Etikan; Oja oje; Oja Osho; Oja Temidire; Oke Harama; Okonla; Okun Eikan; Ramasilo Etikan; Uba Agba; Uba Akobi; Uba Domi; Uba Etikan; Uba Kalebari; Uba Oke Kelian; Uba Ropeda; Uba Yellow
Ilaje	Igbotu	352120	Aboromeji; Aboto Camp; Ago; Ago-Ogele; Ago-Yellow; Amayetigba; Araromi; Arigbe Camp; Baale Camp; Bisewe Golote; Ebidlo; Ekohebo Camp; Enikorogha; Epewe; Eredase Camp; Esenoko Camp; Gbabijo; Gunmagun Camp; Hamidifa; Idigba Camp; Igbebomi Iyara; Igbobini; Igbolani-Arubenghan; Igbotu; Igbotu-Atijo; Igbotu-Gbaluwe; Igbotu-Zion; Igirikile; Imobi; Itebetabe Camp; Iyara; Kafawe; Kitikoro; Kolodi Camp; Kurugbene; Lagereke; Laporen Camp; Lobele Camp; Logede; Lumoko Camp; Moboro Village; Odibo; Ogbeni Camp; Ogunmade; Okoro; Okorogbene; Okuru Camp; Olorunsola Camp; Olowo Camp; Oluagbo; Omukoro Camp; Onipanu Ago Bagi; Onisosi; Otarogbene Camp; Pee Camp; Pghono Camp; Piria; Sabomi Babomi; Sogbo Camp; Surulere; Yogha; Zion
Ilaje	Mahin Kingdom	352117	Abealala; Abereke; Aboto; Ago Doroh; Ago Ikuebolati; Ago Lulu; Ago Olomidegun; Akata; Alagbede; Aruwayo; Asisa; Atijere; Betiegbofo; Broke Camp; Ebute Ipare; Ehin - Osa; Elegboro; Ereke; Ereke Majofodun; Ereke Makuleyi; Etigho; Gbabijo; Ibila; Idigho; Igbegunrin; Igbo - Okuta; Igbobi; Igbokoda; Igbolomi; Ikale Camp; Iloro; Ilu Sosi; Imoluwa; Ita - Age; Italita Camp; Itebukunmi; Job Camp; Korolo; Kugbonre; Kurugbene; Legha; Lerenren; Logede Camp; Madagbayi; Magbehinwa; Mogbojuri; Mahin; Mahintedo; Maran; Moferere; Mogunyanje; Motiala; Motoro; Odun Oloja; Odun Oluma; Odun Oroyo; Odunmogun; Ogorogo; Ohaketa Camp; Ojan; Oke Etigho; Okishilo; Okoga; Okunniyi; Olosunmeta; Opolo; Orere - Ara; Oribero; Orimoloye; Orioke Iwamimo; Oriranyin; Orofin Camp; Oropo Zion; Oroyomi; Pete-Inu; Piawo; Ramasilo; Seja Odo; Seja Oke; Seluwa; Tedo Camp; Tomoloju; Tomoloju Camp; Ugbaha; Zion Gbabijo; Zion Igbokoda; Zion Mahintedo; Zion Ogogoro
Ilaje	Ugbo Kingdom	352116	Abetobo zion; Abokiti; Ago Alufa; Ago nati; Ajegunle; Alagbom zion; Alagbon; Amehin; Apata Ilaje; Asumaga; Awoye; Ayetoro; Bijimi; Bowoto; Eke Atiye; Eke Baale; Eke Didi; Eke Ilutitun; Eke Itiola; Eke Moki; Eke Nla; Eke Ofolajetan; Eke Yonren; Erunna Ogbeni; Erunna; Erunna Lagbe; Gbagara; Idogun; Idogun Ayadi; Idogun Ehinmore; Ikorigho; Ilepete; Ilowo; Ilowo ayetoro; Ilowo Nla; Ilowo ogunsemore; Iluabo; Imoluwa; Jirinwo; Lepe; Molutehin; Obe Adun; Obe akingboye; Obe apata; Obe Arenewo; Obe Dapo; Obe Enikanselu; Obe ifenla; Obe Iji; Obe Jedo; Obe Magbe; Obe Nla; Obe Ogbaro; Obe Olomore; Obe Orisabinone; Obe Rebimino; Obe Rewoye; Obe Sedara; Odofado; Odonla; Odonla meduoye; Odun Ogungbeje; Odun Ojabireni; Odun Oriretan; Odun Oyinbo; Odun Yonren; Ogbongboro; Ogboti; Oghoye; Ojumole; Okun Ipin; Olotu; Olotu Kuwo; Olotu Wiye; Olotu Yara; Orioke Harama; Oroto; Otumara; Otumare se- side; Owoleba; Saheyi; Uba Korigho; Ubale; Ubale kekere; Ubale nla; Ugbage; Ugbo; Ugbonla; Womi Tearen; Yaye; Zion Ikerigho; Zion Iluabo
Ile Oluji/Okeigbo	Agunla	351107	Adebaso; Adekunle; Adeoba; Agunla; Aiyegun; Akinbobola; Akingbami I & II; Akingbe; Akinmadewa; Akinmisiola; Akinsulure; Akinye- Oja; Akinyemiju; Asokin; Ayetoro; Ayo; Bakare; Ipoti; Itamesi; Lasobewu; Lebiba; Lipepeye; Odo; Ogunja; Ojowo; Okobolunsen; Oladapo; Oloronbo; Omigbede; Owodezama
Ile Oluji/Okeigbo	Bamkemo	351109	Aba-Gureje; Aba-John; Awo; Ayadade; Badeji; Bafon; Bajewolu; Bamikemo; Bamikemo-Oja; Dagbaja; Gate; Iyire; Iyire Adeboyeku; Iyire-Akinmatimi; Jegun; Labowi I & II; Lipanu; Lisamikan; Ologundudu; Ulosen
Ile Oluji/Okeigbo	Ileoluji	351110	Adenipekun; Adenyan; Agbabakawodi Club 71; Ajifarere; Akintimehin; Akinyosotu; Alhaji Odo; Asio; Atanyele; Awokiyesi; Ayeyemi; Barracks Road; Bolawa; Caeco; College Road; Ehinogbe; Hofere; Iparuku; Irewumi; Lawe; Lodasa; Lodun Lanre; Logo-Lane; Lokun; Odoaisom; Odololo; Odosikan; Odotu; Odoyegbe; Ogbodu; Ogbotitun; Ogunsusi Lane; Oja-Idioma; Oke- Atiba; Oke- Otunba; Oke- Pole; Oke-Alafia; Okerisa; Okerowo; Oketoko; Okunmuyiwe; Olorunkole; Omoko; Omokole; Otasan; Parde; Samalogbe; Skyway; Surulere; Temi-tope; Temidire; Temiwohunwa; Wasimi
Ile Oluji/Okeigbo	Okeigbo	351108	Aba Kolajo; Aba Ojoja Aba Panu; Ajegunle; Ajejigi; Ajeloro; Akinola; Akitikoro; Alabata; Alarere; Awo; Awo Odunkunle; Awopeju; Bolorunduro; Ehin Oke; Erin Titun; Gbinrindin; Idi Asan; Idi-Iroko; Igbo Oiodumare 11; Igbo Olodumare 1; Kajola Arepa; Ode Okuta; Oke Alafia I; Oke Alafia II; Ologiri; Oloruntele; Omilaje; Orinsumibare; Ramonu; Temidire
Ile Oluji/Okeigbo	Tenidire	351111	Aba Michael; Aba-John; Adefulire; Ajana; Asatan; Awo-Usman; Ayesan; Dosi Lomafe; Eloyeko; Eyingun; Eyingun Akimoledun; Farm Settlement; Kajola; Kolo; Leugun; Limitutu; Losunla; Luwasola; Moferere; Oke-Agbara; Oke-Awo; Onimole; Orisunmibale; Sade I & II; Sadiku; Sipo; Temidire
Irele	Ajagba	352104	Ajagba; Ayadi; Logbosere; Onitorotoro
Irele	Akotogbo	352105	Abusoro; Ajijoh; Akotogbo; Barogbo; Iju-Osun; Kenumu; Naino; Reuben; Yopiara
Irele	Igbinsin Oloto	352102	Abraham Camp; Ago Taiye; Ago Unolo; Apene/ Bopbotu; Dugbolu; Ebute Oko; Gbejoko Camo; Igbinsin Oke; Ikale Camp; Kanne; Odo Igbisin; Ojo Camp; Osopan
Irele	Ode-Irele	352101	Aduga; Akingboye; Gbeleju Lodan; Gbogi; Igboke; Irelejare; Iyara I; Kidimu; Labale; Legbongbon; Leunrun Luhoho Oke; Likaran; Lipano; Lokaka; Lomeye; Lutako; Omififun; Ori-Ale Oyo; Otuloya; Ruwahe
Irele	Omi	352103	Abiola Camp; Agoraya; Akinboyewa Camp; Akinmoye Camp; Apozere Camp; Chief Luperik; Chief Memogho; Chief Oredo; Chief Wogbo; Igo- Ome; Iyana; Iyasan; James Upogo; Lisha Camp; Lot Camp; Obaterun; Obireri; Obondogo; Odogbo; Ogunkalu Camp; Ojomo Camp; Seja
Odigbo	Abojupa	350102	Abojupa I; Abojupa II; Adeogun; Adigbolu; Agbirigidi; Agunla; Ajebamidele; Ajebamidele Daodu; Ajegunle Elepa; Alagbo; Alayumire; Araromi; Arato Ologo; Arowole; Asana akinyemi; Asana Famule; Asana Fatanmi; Asana Kode; Asana Pakoyi; Atari-Oke I&II; Atototan; Ayedarade; Ayede Adeboyeku; Ayue; Balagbe; Balewa; Bolorunduro Idi Osan; Bolorunduro Sanni; Fasawe; Gbamrinlegi; Ibasayin; Irowa; Ita Efun; Joseye; Karimu; Kokumo; Kolawole; Laleipa; Ologunba; Olojo Faguwa; Olorunkemi; Oloyede; Omoboyewa; Omogunsoye; Omoyoge; Orisa Egbe; Rubber Para; Seriki; Sokoto; Sopotosepete; Wasini-Odunwo
Odigbo	Alawaye	350103	Adejayan; Adewakun; Agba; Ajebamibo; Akinkuhinmi; Akinladenu; Akinpeloye; Awawye; Edinmolota; Fawehinmi; Kajola; Lipepeye; Lota Adegasoye; Lota-Akinseye; Lota-Gbaje; oloronbo; Olorunsogo; Olowosunmoye; Shendurowo
Odigbo	Araromi-Obu	350106	Aba-Panu; Ago Alane; Ago-Alaye; Ago-Baale; Ago-Ibadan; Ago-Jeremiah; Ago-Paul; Agrifon Village; Ajebanbo; Ajebandele; Araromi-obu; Aujeseun; Ayesan; Ayetimbo; Basola; Bolorunduro; Erinjomo; Gbegude; Gbogi; Good Luck; Ifara; Igo Village; Imorun; Kangidi Camp; Leege; Lisagbede; Nursery; Ogunlepa; Oil Palm Camp; Okefare; Olaibon; Olomiro; Oloruntedo; Oloruntedo I; Oluwa Forest Reserve; Ondo state; Onipaanu; Oniparaga; Orisunbare; Paranta; Raphael; Rubber Estate; Saba
Odigbo	Oniparaga	350107	Aba Alafia; Aba Ilaje; Aba Jimoh; Aba Raphael; Aba Roder; Aba Wole; Abapanu; Aforestation Project; Ajebanbo; Ajebandele; Badee; Bolomudureo II; Bolorunduro I; Jagiodo; Kajola; Komowa Camp; Kosem; Labon Camp; Lalepa; Lisa - Agbede; Makinde; Obadore; Olokuta I; Oloruntedo; Olotua II; Onipetesi; Onitea; Orita Ajebanbo; Sakoto I; Sakoto II; Temidire
Odigbo	Ore (Rural)	350101	Aba Eire Lucas; Aba Fasu; Aba James; Aba-Ojoja; Aba-Panu; Abagun; Aiyede; Ajegunle; Ajeloro; Alarere; Arato Ologo; Awo-Odekunle; Awopeju; Ayede Adeboyegun; Azan Fatanmi; Erin Titun; Idi-Asan; Igbo Olodumare I; Igbo-Olodumare II; Ode- Okuta; Ode-Alafia I; Ode-Alafia II; Omilaje; Omoyogba; Orisumbare; Temidire
Okitipupa	Ayeka	350113	Araromi; Ayeka; Ugbe-Ayeka; Ugboran Camp
Okitipupa	Igbodigo	350112	Afo Balumen; Ago Tejere; Igbodigo 1; Igbodigo 2; Odole Camp
Okitipupa	Igbotako	350109	Abegunde Village; Abusoro Camp 1; Abusoro Camp 2; Adegolu Village; Ademujimi Village; Akinfosile Village; Bilado Market; Estate Camp 1; Estate Camp 2; Ewi camp; Idi Opopo Village; Idungun Village; Ilado Ibini; Ilebe Village; Labatiyan Village; Laguntan Camp; Laiol Village; Lawereere Village; Lobuko Camp 1; Lobuko Camp 2; Lokuka (Better Life); Lokuka Village; Loyinmi Village; Mile 4 village; Mile 6 Village; Mobolorunduro Mile 49; Moriwo Village; Ogunlowo Village; Oke-Ola Village; Okedebi Camp 1; Okedebi Camp 2; Omowole Village; Shogbon Village; Taiwo Village
Okitipupa	Ikoya	350105	Ikulala Camp; Ilado Camp; Ipeta; Lijoyi Camp; Liyete; Loni Camp; Lowolowo Camp; Majeja; Obajere Camp; Obolo Camp; Odolawo; Ohonpan; Ojokodo Camp; Okeraye Camp; Okitipupa Oko; Omoyinbo Camp; Onagunte; Oniseregun Camp; Orunkanyerin Camp; Pepere; Peregun Camp; Sapele; Urele; Uwalere Camp; Yasere Camp
Okitipupa	Ilutitun	350110	Adekanle; Adewinle; Agirinfon I; Ago Alafia; Ago Edema; Ago Ogunji; Ago Oyinbo; Ago-Agbedun; Akperen Camp; Aoro Camp; Ayetoro 1; Ayetoro 2; Daweren; Iditala; Idogun; Igbaroko; Igbasan; Igbile; Iju-Odo Ilutitun; Iju-Oke Market; Ilado; Ilado Ojapinwa; Ilado Olatenuju; Ilado Olowosusi; Ilebe; Ilutituu Estate; Ira Odole; Ira Petu; Iwade; Kisoso I; Kisoso II; Korode II; Lerinrin; Lerun; Mobolorunduro; Obonde; Ogunteko; Okegbe; Okerisa Camp; Okerisa Jimba; Okerisa Lulawo; Oko Lisa; Oloruntedo; Omonigbo; Omonigbo Camp; Sogbon; Yasere
Okitipupa	Odeya	350108	Abusoro Camp; Abusoro Village; Adegboraye Camp; Aduwo Camp; Agbabu Camp; Agbabu Village; Agbaje Village; Ago Oloja; Ajegunle; Akeun Camp; Akinrinleye Camp; Batedo camp; Ekelen Camp; Epowe; Gbude Camp; Idebi Village; Idogun Village; Igbo Olofin; Igboluwaye; Igoloye; Igorisa village; Ikoloma Village; Ilutitun Camp; Irokin Village; Isowa Village; Ladan Village; Ladawo Village; Lafe village; Lagbigidi Camp; Lagboja Village; Lapeti; Likaje Camp; Likare Village; Loda Camp; Lumeko Village; Luwoye Camp; Mile 1 camp; Modebiayo Camp; Mulekagbo; Odofin Village; Ogunmade Village; Oha camp; Ojabale Village; Ojokodo Village; Ojomo Village; Okamisa; Oke-Oluwa camp; Okerisa Village; Olibo Camp; Oloijau Village; Oluwa Village; Omidu; Ominla Village; Orokan; Owe Camp; Rain-Head Junction; Uboke Camp; Umobi Village; Umoboro Village; Yasere Village; Yeabata Camp; Zeba Camp
Okitipupa	Okitipupa	350104	Abisoro Camp; Abogedegbe; Adegoju Camp; Aduwo Camp; Agbere; Ago Akerun Camp; Ago Gbagudu; Ago Taiwo; Ajana Camp; Akinbulure Camp; Awolowo Camp; Calabar Camp Idepe; Dugbolu; Egure Jomo; Farm-Settlement; Herbert Camp; Igborogbo
Ondo East	Oboto	351102	Aleru; Araromi; Baikin; Bolorunduro; Igba; Igbo-Oja; Ireje; Kayola; Laworo; Lodasa; Logara; Lomoso; Mobire; Obun-Ewi; Obun-Ondo; Omiluri; Ulasimi
Ondo East	Owena Obadore	351103	Aba-Ikirun; Adaja; Adeyanju; Aiyetoro; Akintewe; Anigbogi; Aponla; Apurere; Augusts; Bagbe; Doherty; Epe; Erinla; Gbandan; Igbindo; Iguusin; Ilunla; Jegunle; Kolawole; Komowa; Labosipo; Lafiaji; Lamu; Leepo; Leku; Lemoso; Leyowo; Lipepeye; Litetu; Lobi; Logaara; Lomututu; Lotgbo; Mobolade; Modebiayo; Number; Obada; Obadere; Obuakekere; Odowo; Ogho; Ogundele; Oju-Oluwa; Oke-Alafia; Okekun; Okeruku; Oladapo; Olorun Sogo; Olorun-Gbadurami; Olorunsefunmi; Oloruntedo; Orisunmibare; Orunbato; Osun; Otokola; Owoele; Sade; Sasere; Sokoto; Solo; Sopotospete; Temidire; Tokunbo; Tolagbola; Urore; Yeu
Ondo East	Tekunle	351105	Ajabamboorin; Asantan-Fbe; Asantan-Oja; Awaye I & II; Awoduyi; Ayadi; Ayetoro; Baipie; Ebunla; Elikenah; Fagbo; Fagbo-Centre; Gbolagun; Ighori; Jeun; Kooni; Loka; Losare; Moraje; Oke-Opa; Oke-Oya; Okegegere; Omifunfun; Omunutun; Osun; Otalupe; Owena-Tepo; Owomamowo; Sasere; Soko; Tepo
Ondo West	Ajegunle	351104	Aboba; Adeoye; Ajaba-Alafia; Ajegunle; Akinyosoye; Aratu-Olojo; Aratundin; Ayetimbo; Ayetoro; Fadani; Gbaghengha; Gbagia-Ile; Gbagia-Oja; Gbengbo; Gbokuta; Ilutitun; Irowa; Laje; Lijoka; Losan I; Losan II; Losare; Obado; Oigbe; Oluwabasiri; Onisoosi; Orisunmi; Ounkeko; Temidire
Ondo West	Bomodeloku	351106	Ajebamo; Ayikun; Dudu; Ita Oba; Laagba; Leruku; Leutu; Lolorunranmilowo; Olorunsefunmi; Ugbo
Ondo West	Ondo	351101	Abusoro; Ajebambo; Ajebamidele; Apaja; Araromi-Oke; Ayesanmi; Basola; Gbokufa; Igbo-Ake; Ikunja; Ironsi; Itagbogi; Lapawe; Lasoro; Lugbogi; Masole; Mobayode; Modeboayo; Moferere; Mojolu; Motadale; Orisunmibare; Sasere
Ose	Afo	341116	Anade; Araromi; Atiba; Igbodu; Iwoye; Jaipe; Ohin; Ugbetere; Ugboka
Ose	Arimogija	341118	Ugboke Ikare
Ose	Idoani	341115	Ago Alamasi; Baale Village; Igbo Otagbe; Igbogburu; Kajola; Kekeri; Odoro; Ofunrun; Ogege Camp; Okikanmi; Olagbe; Omi Adun; Omireke; Osan Daji Camp; Otagboosa; Otalere; Otaloro; Sekere; Soleh Boneh
Ose	OIdogun	341114	Ago; Ago Egbira; Ago Erukuyeye; Ago Raji; Aherebe; Kekeri; Ogege Camp; Okin Kanmi; Olageke Camp; Ota Igbeera
Ose	Ifon	341109	Abusoro; Ago A1sabare; Agric Settlement; Arepa; Elegbeka; Iju Agborin; Okitiofa; Omi Alafia; Ori-Ohin; Oruju; Ugbo Oke; Ugbonia
Ose	Ijagba	341112	Akori; Amian; Apokorobi; Eze; Ezeje II; Itutuwa; Odibiade I& II; Odikahor; Tode Camp; Tutu Kuru; Ugbogoro
Ose	Ikaro	341110	Araromi; Ikaro; Odotori; Uguru; Ulema
Ose	Imeri	341117	Kajola; Okeloro
Ose	Imoru	341111	Ago Aruwajoye; Ago Ikare; Ago Oyinbo; Ago-Owadana; Akemiri Camps; Eleninla; Omiobi; Tebe; Ugbooke Ikare
Ose	Okeluse	341113	Abuja Mile-2 Camp & 4 Camp; Ago Omoba; Aminu Camp; Apololo; Ariyan Mile; Mokoko; Ogbese Falodun; Oluse Camp; Omolege; Omonuogbe Camp; Omosule; Ute
Ose	Ute	341119	Arijonpeye; Aso-Finch; Ero; Owajalaye; Sanusi
Owo	Emure-Ile	341107	Eporo; Gbadegun; Oke-Camp; Ulura
Owo	Idasen	341104	Amirin; Ijegunmon; Ilale; Ilema; Isijogun; Keji; Ogain
Owo	Ipele	341103	Ago Oloko; Aladie Ofi; Alo; Molege; Okiti Ota; Pole; Uwese Omosule
Owo	Isuada	341105	Igbo-Oke; Obaso Oto; Odo; Riya; Sasore
Owo	Iyere	341102	Igbe; Ijelu; Oyoyo; Umoje; Upo
Owo	Owo (rural)	341101	Amehinti; Ijebu Owo; Obaseto; Ojana; Ugbeta; Ugbo-Agbo
Owo	Upenmen	341106	Ago; Ago-Paanu; Ose Ohere; Yeye
Owo	Uso	341108	Aruwajoye; Asolo; Kajola-Ode; Odofin; Oke Odo

== By electoral ward ==
Below is a list of polling units, including villages and schools, organised by electoral ward.

LGA	Ward	Polling Unit Name
Akoko North East	Edo	Ode Elesho/Ode Okeloko, In Front Of Ch. Alakelus House; Odeke/Aisa/Ode Assi Alu, In Front Of Chief Assis House; Odeke/Aisa/Ode Assi Alu Open Space Near Chief Assis House; Ode Kolofin/Odeagbari In Front Of Chief Oloruns House; Ode Odalure/Osoro/Ode Imoku/Ode Olori/Okegbede Barracks A. U. D Primary School III; Ode Odalure/Osoro/Ode Imoku/Ode Olori/Okegbede Barracks A. U. D Pry. Sch. III; Odeke Aisa/Ode Assi Alu Opp. Onigbedes House; Odeluke, In Front Of Late Chief Odelukes House; Iyofen/Ulagbo/Ipinola/Okun/Ugbigbo, In Front Of Chief Feles House; Araromi, In Front Of Atunluses House; Ode Odose In Front Of Chief Eledos House; Okereo/Odose/Ode Ateti, In Front Of Ch. Badas House
Akoko North East	Ikado I	Garuba Obayaji/Gomina Market, In Front Of Garuba Comp; Alaja Ajara House, In Front Of Old Nepa Office; Alaja Ajara House, Beside Old Nepa Office; Kolade Bankole Comp/Bamisaye/Inu Odi, Gbagba Ojude Okela; Kolade Bankole/Bamisaye/Inu-Odi, In Front Of Amodus House; Ajijola Alaji Taosiri/Gbada Comp., In Front Of Taosiris House; Osabi, L. A Pry. Sch. Ikado; Ibaka Owonikoko, Moslem Pry. Sch. Okela; C. A. C/Taiwo, St. Josephs C. A. C Pry. Sch. Okela; Olukares Comp., Open Space At Olukares Market; Innedunne Comp, Behind Post Office; Ogbohunekun/Olaitan Comp, In Front Of Ogbohunekuns House
Akoko North East	Ikado II	Eshe Otara I & II, St. Thomas Pry Sch. Eshe; Olorunsogo/Ilufowobi, Moslem Pry Sch. Eshe; Agede/Oloro, Open Space In Odoro; Victory College/Ugbe Rd., Jubilee Market; Court Area, Opposite National Bank; Iyame I & II, In Front Of Assis House; Mount Camel/Ifelodun, Mount Camel Sec. Sch. Ikare; Odoside/Elemeje Comp/Orogun Comp., In Front Of Elemejes Comp; Odoside/Elemejecomp/Orogun Comp., In Front Of Elemejes Comp; Olonas Comp/Agbejas Comp., In Front Of Jegedes House
Akoko North East	Ilepa I	Okedadun, In Front Of Babakoles House; Odeokun, In Front Of Olodeokuns House; Lokoja Garage/Odenaogun/Ogunmola/Odelisa/Dejiolumoye/Balogun, At Lokoja Garage; Cac Pry Sch., Akerele/Buraimo/Asewe, St. Michaels Cac Pry. Sch. Ilepa; Araromi/Olupona, In Front Of Mr. Fulanis House; Omotola Comp., St. Michaels Cac Sch.; Osaniwo/Odeke/Osamona, At Osaniwos Comp; Odeayin, At Odeayins Comp; Adeboje/Akuko/Badusi, In Front Of L/A 6a House
Akoko North East	Ilepa II	Alapata, At Mr Suberus House; Owolabi, St. Gregorys Pry Sch Ilepa; Owolabi, St. Gregorys Pry Sch Ilepa; Adumasi, At Adumasis House; Adumasi, Near Adumasis House; Agboriki, Moslem Pry Sch Ilepa; Independence, L. A Pry Sch. Ilepa; Olisa, In Front Of Olisa S House; Adekoya, In Front Of Adekoyas House; Olugboja, Near Olugbojas Hospital
Akoko North East	Isowopo I	Oloro/Olusa, In Front Of Oloros Comp; Oloro/Olusa, Near Oloros Comp; Agede/Odoro, Open Space In Odoro I; Agede/Odoro, Open Space In Odoro II; St Silas Camp (Oka), St Silas Pry Sch Ise; Tupa Camp/Ayegbe Ise, Ayegbe Gram. Sch. Ise; Sabo Ugbe, At Bawas Ware House; Okearan, St. James Ang Pry Sch Ugbe; Oke Ugbe, At Alabi Ajileyes House; Isha Ugbe/Ako Ugbe, At Chief Olisas House; Surulere, At C/J7 Surulere Ugbe; Aduloju, At Adulojus House
Akoko North East	Isowopo II	Osese I & II/Inumba, At Late Akinlofas House; Osese I & II/Inumba, At Mr Suberus House; Ebiolu/Iyoke I & II, At Mr Olufoyes House; Ebiolu/Iyoke I & II, Near Mr Olufoyes House; Tiboyin/Ebimogun/Ima/Olusa, At Oluwades House; Ayegunle, Com. Pry Sch Ayegunle; Seke/Fulani Camp, St Andrews Pry Sch. Akunu; Okenjo/Okeeje Camp/Edebo /Osafa I & II, Beside Akadiris House; Okenjo/Okeeje Camp/Edebo /Osafa I & II, Opposite Akadiri S House; Odosi I & II, Court Hall Auga; Upeli I & II/Ilepa, St Pauls Pry Sch Auga; Okegbagbo, St Pauls Pry Sch Auga; Ekakumo/Ayede/Ayadigi I & II, St Phillips Sch Ikakumo; Ikakumo II; Ajindu Camp
Akoko North East	Iyometa I	Oniku/Iku Mosque Area/Chief Imamiku/Ologbe, At Mohammed Sannis House; A. U. D Area, A. U. D Pry Sch II, Iku; Water Works Area, Opposite Water Works; Otaloke, In Front Of Bolorunduros/Otalokes House; Awara, In Front Of Abus House
Akoko North East	Iyometa II	Emeje Area I & II, At Late Olonas House; Oketun I & II/Okepaye, In Front Of Owatis House; Late Alaha Area, In Front Of Alajas House; Araromi/Oscas, In Front Of Afolabis House; Olowu Comp, K & S Pry Sch. Okegbala; Coop Area, In Front Of Coop Stores; Idomu/Agbrun/Owajimite In Front Of Sule Idomis House; Owa-Ale Area, In Front Of Owale D/45 Okorun; Abadara, Abadara/Oluta Pry. Sch.
Akoko North East	Oorun I	Aofin Comp, At Mr A. B Ogunmolas House; Akinola Comp, Ebenezer A/C Pry Sch Osele; Adedogan, At Ajagbes House; Ajisebioyo Comp, At Ipinlojus House; Omolokojas Comp., At Badas House; Aoro/Maternity/Oyinmo/Lokoja, St Peters Pry Sch; Tafa/Saliu Area, Osele Gramm Sch Ikare
Akoko North East	Oorun II	Aduloju/Akindipe/Oluwabusi Area/Orimolade/Oloruntuyi/Animasaun & Maternity: At Adulojus House; Olaitan/Orungbemi/Olodoruwa Area/Jimba Area, A. U. D Pry Sch Odoruwa; Odoruwa/Imoru/Obayaji, Near Odoruwa; Dadi/Olabode/Ojumu/Rotimi/Afere Area/Afro Musco/St Stephen Church, Infront Of Aferes House; Aguda/Coop Stores, St. Andrews Pry Sch; Mojere Camp/Arowolo/Agbopere, At Mojere Camp; Aduloju/Akindipe/Oluwabusi Area/Orimolade/Oluruntuyi/Animasaun, At Adulojus House; Odoruwa Imoru Obayaji, Near Odoruwa Mosque; Dadi Olabode/Ojumu/Rotimi/Afere Area/Afro Musco/St Stephen Church, Near Aferes House
Akoko North East	Oyinmo	Kowode Market/Suberu/Odeniyans House, At Chief Adunlus House; Kowode Market/Suberu/Odeniyans House, Near Chief Adunlus House; John Holt, At Oladugbas Opp Total Filling Station; Mr Obatimehins/Ala Yeye Aregbesola/Mr Sunday Oloruntuyi, Olumofins Comp; Atere/Owolabi/Alao/Aro/Aduloju/Sunday Comp, At Omojolas House; Osaniyi/Odenusi/Akinnugbagbe/Niyi, At Omowayes House; Osaniyi/Odenusi/Akinnugbagbe/Niyi, At Aletiles House; Omotunwase/Mr Giwas House, At Late Pa Aliu Bakares House; Omotunwase/Mr Giwas House Near Late Pa Aliu Bakares House
Akoko North West	Arigidi/Iye I	Iye Akoko, Christ Sch. Iye; Arigidi Oja, Frontage Of Amodus House; A. U. D Arigidi, A. U. D Pry Sch Arigidi; A. U. D Arigidi, St Pauls Arigidi; A. U. D Arigidi, Maternity Centre Arigidi; A. U. D Arigidi, St Michaels Pry Sch Arigidi; Ija Ija, Holy Rosary Sch Arigidi; Ijaija, Court Hall Arigidi; Ijaija, Catholic Pry Sch; Ijaija, Chief Obajas Compound; Ijaija, Frontage Of Alabis House; Ijaija, Near Olabomis House; Ijaija, Olabomis House; Ijaija, Near Nepa; Ilepa/Ekunso, Edibos House; Ilepa/Ekunso, Old Modern Sch; Ilepa/Ekunso, Late Ogunleyes House; Ajiwas House; Ilepa/Ekunso, Frontage Of Awes House; Ilepa/Ekunso, Frontage Of Adeyemis House
Akoko North West	Arigidi II	Agbaluku/Ministry, Ifesowapo Comm Pry Sch Agbaluku; Agbaluku/Ministry, Ifesowapo Comm Pry Sch Agbaluku; Agbaluku/Ministry, Communitypry Sch Agbaluku; Agbaluku/Ministry, Frontage Of Ayegbusis House; Agbaluku/Ministry, Gideon Nursery Sch Araromi Agbaluku; Imo Arigidi, C. A. C St James, Imo Arigidi; Imo Arigidi, Osin/Ita Imo Arigidi; Imo Arigidi, St James Sch. Imo Iju/Imo; Imo Arigidi, St Stephens Pry Sch Imo; Imo Arigidi, Owuru/Aba Jimoh
Akoko North West	Okeagbe	Aje/Aofin/Onigede/Ido, St. Georges Pry Sch Ido; Aje/Aofin/Onigede/Ido, St. Moses Orimolade Pry Sch; Affa I, Near Elejofes House; Affa I, L. A Pry Sch. Ikulogun; Affa I, Odo Oko And Environment; Affa I, St Theresas Pry Sch; Affa I, Court Hall New Garage; Affa II, Opposite Obas Palace; Affa II, Ogotun Afa Square Along Oke Royal; Affa II, Ogotun Afa Royal House Ogotun; Affa II, Frontage Of Rawas House; Ido Agbe, Ido Ayela Quarters; Oke Olugbin, St Theresas Pry Sch; Aje Camp, Aje Camp; Ima/Igase, Ima/Igase; Court Hall, Igafo/Aroye; Affa I, Isoyi/Ayagele
Akoko North West	Oyin/Oge	St Johns Sch Oyin/Akoko, St Johns Sch Oyin Akoko; Baptisit Day Sch, Baptisit Day Sch, Oyin; Eyo Oke Comp High Sch Oyin Akoko, Eyo Oke Comp High Sch; Under Odan Tree Near Oge, Under Odan Tree Near Oge; Community Pry Sch Oge, Community Pry Sch Oge; Ade Clinic Oge, Boboye/Fadamula; Ayeteju Oge, Ayeteju Oge; Atindi Oge, Ajifa Camp Oge; Ayegunle Camp, Ita Agbo Camp, Oge
Akoko North West	Ajowa/Igasi/Eriti/Gedegede	Ojo, Outside Chief Elekules House; Ojo, Ojo Central Field; Daja, Near Postal Agency; Daja, Opposite Ajowa Market; Uro, L. A Sch Uro; Uro, Near Inubaiye Compound; Ora, Near Ora Mosque; Oso, Iyalodes Compound; Esuku, Opposite Eleshukus Palace; Akunnu, Town Hall, Ajowa; Efifa, In Efifa Ajowa; Gedegede, Gedegede Town Hall; Igasi, L. A Pry Sch Igasi; Eriti, Baptist Pry Sch
Akoko North West	Ogbagi	Aofin/Oja/Mushin, Salvation Army Sch Ogbagi; Aofin/Oja/Mushin, Court Hall Premises; Aofin/Oja/Mushin, Ahmadiyya Gram Sch Ogbagi; Aofin/Oja/Mushin, Coop Store Area Ogbagi; Aofin/Oja/Mushin, Odemole Comp Ogbagi; Aofin/Oja/Mushin, Okeria Comp I, Oso; Aofin/Oja/Mushin, Ajuta High Sch; Aofin/Oja/Mushin, St Johns Pry Sch; Ala/Aladegbaye, C. A. C Okegbagbo; Ala/Aladegbaye, A. U. D Pry Sch Ogbagi; Ala/Aladegbaye, Community Pry Sch Ogbagi; Ala/Aladegbaye, K & S Church Egun; Ala/Aladegbaye, Elegun Comp. Ogbagi; Ala/Aladegbaye, St James Church Egun; Ala/Aladegbaye, Near Coop. Bank Ogbagi; Ala/Aladegbaye, Oke Odowa Uko, Ogbagi; Ala/Aladegbaye Alayes Comp. Ogbagi; Ala/Aladegbaye, High Chief Olofe Camp; Apa/Araromi/Abilogbo, Near Lawal Alaga Ogbagi; Apa/Araromi/Abilogbo, Onijakas Comp Abilogbo; Apa/Araromi/Abilogbo, Post Office Premises; Apa/Araromi/Abilogbo, Ahmadiyya Gram Sch Egoto Qtrs; Apa/Araromi/Abilogbo, Oluwores Comp Ogbagi; Apa/Araromi/Abilogbo, C. A. C Pry Sch
Akoko North West	Oke-Irun/Surulere	Oke Irun I, St Lukes Pry Sch Okegun; Oke Irun I, St Benedicts Sch Okegbo Abepe; Oke Irun I, Ebiomo Oloyi I & II - Ebiomo Oloyi; Oke Irun I, Imoleji Oke Irun Imoleji; Oke Irun I, Ode Atan -Oke Irun; Oke Irun II, Ipare/Ubia Qtrs; Oke Irun II, Aofin Elesan-Oke Irun; Oke Irun II, Idao I & II - Odegun; Oke Irun II, Ode Asamo Coop Area - Odesamo; Oke Irun II, Ugbo Asaoye - Oke Irun; Oke Irun II, Oluta I, II & III Oke Irun; Surulere, L. A Sch Surulere; Surulere, L. A Sch Surulere
Akoko North West	Odo-Irun/Oyinmo	Okeana/Abilogbo/Odo Irun, Court Hall Odo Irun; Okeana/Abilogbo/Odo Irun, St Peters Sch Odo Irun; Okeana/Abilogbo/Odo Irun, Post Office Premises Odo Irun; Okeana/Abilogbo/Odo Irun, Open Space In Ijebi Odo Irun; Okeana/Abilogbo/Odo Irun, St Peters Ilodi Odo Irun; Okeana/Abilogbo/Odo Irun, Oke Arede Odo Irun; Okeana/Abilogbo/Odo Irun, Maternity Centre Ilodi Odo Irun; Oyinmo/Ayegunle, Omolore High Sch, Frontage Of Alakas House; Oyinmo/Ayegunle, Oyinmo Odo Irun; Oyinmo/Ayegunle, Ojeka Odo Irun; Oyinmo/Ayegunle, Ugboji Odo Irun; Oyinmo/Ayegunle, Okeana Odo Irun; Oyinmo/Ayegunle, Ugbo Oge/ Odo Oko
Akoko North West	Ese/Afin	Modowa Afin, A. U. D Sch, Afin; Modowa Afin, Open Space At Ege; Modowa Afin, Odo Afin; Modowa Afin, Erinmo Afin; Esuga/Eguo/Ekuro, St Johns Sch Ese; Esuga/Eguo/Ekuro, Maternity Centre; Esuga/Eguo/Ekuro, C. A. C Premises; Esuga/Eguo/Ekuro, Opposite Aruwajoye
Akoko North West	Erusu/Karamu/Ibaramu	Ikaramu, Court Hall Ikaramu; Ikaramu, Moslem Pry Sch Ikaramu; Ikaramu, Maternity Centre Ikaramu; Ikaramu, St James Pry Sch Ikaramu; Iyoke, St Pauls Pry Sch Iyoke Ikaramu; Erusu, Baptist Day Sch, Erusu; Erusu, St Johns A/C Sch, Erusu; Erusu, C. H. S Okesan; Erusu, Maternity Centre Erusu; Ase, Near Ase Maternity; Iyani, United Pry. Sch. Iyani, Ibaramu/Iyani I & II; Iyani, United Primary School Iyani, Ibaramu/Iyani I & II; Ibaramu, Town Hall, Ibaramu I Town Hall Ibaramu II; Ikaramu, L. A Pry Sch Ikaramu; Ikaramu, Community Pry Sch Ikaramu; Erusu, Court Hall Erusu; Erusu, St. Thomas Erusu
Akoko South East	Epinmi I	Ever Rock : Ever Rock Pry Sch; Community Pry Sch :Community Pry Sch; Comm. Pry. Sch., Comm. Pry. Sch.; C. A. C Pry Sch; C. A. C Pry Sch; Sabo, Sabo; Isalu, Isalu Market
Akoko South East	Epinmi II	Jja/C Sch, Jja/C Sch; Iseu Qtrs, Iseu Qtrs; Idera Mkt/Iburon, Idera Market; Iburon, Iburon; Igede Ukule, Igede Ukule
Akoko South East	Ifira	Z. I/C. A. C Sch, C. A. C Sch; Agesin/L. A Sch, L. A Sch; St Peters/Ipirin, St Peters Sch; Z. I Sch, Z. I School; Ise Community, Ise Quarters; Ipiran Community, Ipirin Community
Akoko South East	Ipe I	St James Sch., St James Sch; Ipe High School, Ipe High School; Ipaso Town Centre, Ipaso Town Centre; Okuan Town Hall, Okuan Town Hall
Akoko South East	Ipe II	St Johns Sch., St Johns Sch; Uba Junction, Uba Junction; Atunlese, Atunlese; Igbede Qtrs, Igbede Qtrs; Itoto, Itoto
Akoko South East	Ipesi	St Johns School, St Johns School; St Unsular, St Unsular; Ogboye Comp, Ogboye Comp
Akoko South East	Isua I	Ebenezer Pry. Sch., Ebenezer Pry. Sch.; Ebenezer/C. A. C, Ebenezer/C. A. C; Comm High School, Comm High School
Akoko South East	Isua II	Ozogoro Quarters, Ozogoro Quarters; St Patricks School, St Patricks School; Irobo Quarters, Irobo Quarters; Ereva Okunnu, Ereva Okunnu
Akoko South East	Isua III	Agunbiade Street, Agunbiade Street; St Josephs School, St. Josephs Sch; St Josephs/Maternity, St Josephs/Maternity; Izo Quarters, Izo Quarters
Akoko South East	Isua IV	L. A School, L. A School; Court Hall, Court Hall; Eti Ose, Eti Ose; Apata Quarters, Apata Quarters; A. C School Oyara, A. C School Oyara; Agbasi Quarters: Agbasi Quarters; Near Palace: Near Palace
Akoko South East	Sosan	St Andrews School, St Andrews School; St Peters School, St Peters School
Akoko South West	Oka I Ibaka / Sabo	Ibaka I, A. U. D Pry School; Ibaka II, St Marks Pry School; Ibaka III, St Marks Pry School; Ibaka IV, Christ Pry School; Ibaka V, Christ Pry School; Ibaka VI, Town Hall Ibaka; Ibaka VII, Ayeni Quarters Ibaka; Ibaka VIII, Odole Quarters Ibaka; Ibaka IX, Olukoju Compound; Ibaka X, Ilegbusi Compound; Ibaka XI, Arepena Quarters; Sabo I, Sabo Quarters; Igia I, Igia Quarters
Akoko South West	Oka II A Ikanmu	Ikanmu I, St Saviours Pry Sch; Ikanmu II, St Saviours Pry Sch; Ikanmu III, U. P. E Pry Sch; Ikanmu IV, Abisi Quarters Ikannu; Ikanmu V, Mabels House; Ikanmu VI, Arogbofa Compound; Ikanmu VII, Erinobo Compound I; Ikanmu VIII, Daodus Compound; Ikanmu IX, Abiri Qtrs II; Ikanmu X, Erinomo Compound II
Akoko South West	Oka II B Okia/Korowa/Simerin/Uba	Okia I, St Davids Pry School; Okia II, Iroho Okia; Korowa I, St Josephs Pry School; Korowa II, Ogoso High School; Korowa III, Asalu Quarters; Korowa IV, Olumogun Quarters; Korowa V, Ogoso High School; Uba I, St Josephs Pry Sch, Uba; Uba II, Leburu Compound; Uba III, Arije Compound; Simerin I, St Sylverius Pry School; Simerin II, Simerin Mkt Square; Simerin III, Oladapos Compound; Simerin IV, Daodus Compound
Akoko South West	Oka III A Agba	Agba I, St Mathews Pry Sch; Agba II, Ebenezer Pry Sch; Agba III, Araromi Market, Agba; Agba IV, Joseph Balogun Qtrs; Agba V, St Pius Pry Sch; Agba VI, St Johns Pry Sch; Agba VII, Balogun Compound; Agba VIII, Oloruntobis Compound; Akusa I, Balogun Gbeyas Compound
Akoko South West	Oka III B Owase /Ikese/Iwonrin/Ebinrin/Idorin	Owase I, C. A. C Gram. Sch; Owase II, Arabas Compound; Owase III, Aduloju/Shagari Village; Iboje I, Adodos Compound; Iboje II, Alebiosus Compound; Iboje III, Alebiosus Compound; Ikese I, Z. I Pry Sch; Ikese II, St Johns Pry Sch; Ikese III, U. P. E Pry Sch; Ikese IV, Omololu Qtrs; Ikese V, Salami Street; Ikese VI, Z. I Pry Sch; Iworin I, St Marys Pry Sch; Iworin II, Alejolowo Qtrs; Iworin III, Iworin Qtrs; Ebinrin I, St Patricks Pry Sch; Ebinrin II, St Patricks Pry Sch
Akoko South West	Oka IV/Owake/Ebo/Ayegunle	Owake I, Owake Qtrs; Owake II, Owake Qtrs; Ebo I, Alegbeleye Qtrs; Ebo II, Alegbeleye Qtrs; Ayegunle I, St Lukes Pry Sch; Ayegunle II, St Anthonys Pry Sch; Ayegunle III, Ayegunle High Sch; Ayegunle IV, Ogidans Compound; Ayegunle V, St Lukes Pry Sch
Akoko South West	Oka V A Owalusin/Ayepe	Owalusi I, St Michaels Pry. Sch.; Owalusi II, L. A Pry Sch; Owalusi III, Holy Trinity Pry Sch; Owalusi IV, Community Pry Sch; Owalusi V, Aduloju Compound I; Owalusi VI, Orimogunjes Compound II; Owalusi VII, Ehinmabajes Compound I; Owalusi VIII, L. A Pry Sch; Owalusi IX, Aduloju Compound II; Owalusi X, Ehinmabaje Compound II; Ayepe I, Agbadotun Qtrs I; Igbeyinadun Qrts; Ayepe III, Community Pry Sch
Akoko South West	Oka V B Oka Odo/Okela/Bolorunduro	Okaodo I, Ologbese Compound; Okaodo II, Ologun Compound; Okaodo III, Akember Compound; Okaodo IV, Ologbese Compound; Aletile Compound; Bolorunduro I, Near Mission Qtrs
Akoko South West	Ikun	Ikun I, St Peters Pry Sch; Ikun II, Z. I Pry Sch; Ikun III, Holy Trinity Pry Sch; Ikun IV, Sasere Compound I; Ikun V, Sasere Compound II; Ikun VI, Odeonibaka Compound; Ikun VII, Odeonikun Compound; Ikun VIII, St. Peters Pry. Sch.
Akoko South West	Supare I	Afaa I, Space At Okamoro Compound; Afaa II, Space At Ayelanwa Compound; Afaa III, Space At Ugbonla; Afaa IV, Space At Ose Camp; Ebemewa (Near Salvation Army School); Open Space At Alare Compound; Open Space At Elero; Open Space At Okelisa; In Front Of Block A, Salvation Army School, Etioro; Infront Of Health Centre, Etioro; Infront Of Eleshin, Etioro; Abata, Etioro; Open Space At Okegbon
Akoko South West	Supare II	Obagure I, Obagure Qtrs; Ibereku I, Jimoh Store; Idofin I, Chief Odofin Compound; Akowonjo I, St Lukes Pry Sch; Ogangan I, Ogangan Qtrs; Okere I, Christ Pry Sch; Okere II, Christ Pry Sch; Egure I, St James Pry Sch; Egure II, Community Pry Sch; Igbegun I, Igbegun Farm Settlement; Oriri I, Oriri Qrts; Isewa I, Atere Compound; Korowa I, Korowa Camp
Akoko South West	Akungba I	Akua I, Post Office Premises; Akua II, Ogunleye House; Akua III, Agidiomo Compound; Akua IV, Alakun Compound; Ibaka I, Christ Pry School; Ibaka II, Ita Balogun Compound; Ibaka III, Dr Jayebos Compound; Ibaka IV, Orunkoyi Compound; Ibaka V, A. U. D Pry School; Ilale I, Rabius Compound; Ilale II, Community Pry School; Ilale III, Community Pry School
Akoko South West	Akungba II	Akungba I, Ac/Cac United Pry School; Akungba II, Ac/Cac United Pry School; Akungba III, Ologunowas Compound; Akungba IV, Sukori Compound; Okele I, Yakubu Compound Akungba; Okele II, Adakua Compound Akungba; Okele III, Oloris Compound; Okusa I, Holy Trinity Pry School Akungba; Okusa II, Near Emmanuel Ang. Church Akungba; Iwaloye Compound, Akungba
Akure North	Agamo/Oke-Oore/Akomowa	Oke-Oore Mkt/Mariyan/Opokiti House, Market Place; Asebueye/ Fatutu/Ayetoro Junction, William Odiazes House; Okebodi/ Eyejero/ Alamo Gram. Sch., Alamo Gram. School; St Johns Pry. Sch. Oke Iyanu/Eyefasujunction, St Johns Pry School; Agamo/Oseyabu/Camp, Ooga At Agamo Market; Erinwa I, II & III/Aba Ijebu St. Daniels Pry Sch; Igbomoba/Ayetoro, Ebenezer Pry Sch; Oladimeji Camp/Ijaye I & II, Chief Aros House
Akure North	Ayede/Ogbese	Comp High Sch I & II, Ayede Comp. High Sch; Ajagbara Village/Makanju, L. A Pry Sch Makanju; Araromi Ago Odo, At Araromi; St Marys Pry Sch, St Marys Pry Sch; Market Sq I, Ayede Mkt; Market Sq II, Near Ayede Mkt; Ogbese I & II, St Andrews Pry Sch; Ogbese III, At Ogbese; Owode/Ajebamidele/Olisa Camp, At Owode; Oke Agunla Township/Oke Agunla, At Agunla Township
Akure North	Ayetoro	Motor Park I & II, Near Motor Park; Motor Park III, Ajegunle I & II Town Hall Area, In Front Of Olas House; Motor Park III, Ajegunle I & II Town Hall Area, Near Olas House; Idera St. I & II Maternity, In Front Of Toluwas House; Oke Igbala I & II, Akinwunmis House; Town Hall I & II, Infront Of Town Hall Building; Ajegunle III, Aseperis House
Akure North	Igbatoro	Imafon, At Imafon; Igusin, At Igusin; Adejubu/L. A. Pry. Sch., L. A Pry Sch; Kojola, St Pauls Pry Sch; Ilado, At Ilado; Olomodudan/Ago Panu, L. A Pry Sch Ago Panu; Olobi, St Peters Pry Sch; Tedibomi Ala, At Ala Maternity; Familugba, At Familugba; Familugba, At Bolorunduro; Familugba, At Egbeta; Familugba, At Ajegunle; Ago Ada, At Ago Ada; Ago Stephen/Malato, At Ago Stephen; Ileyo/Ileyo Ogunleye/Ileyo Odole, At Ileyo Hqtrs; Isagba, At Isagba; Ago Dada, Open Space At Ago Dada; Obatedo, At Obatedo
Akure North	Igoba/Isinigbo	Akinremi Estate, Akinremi House; St Mathews I & II Agbaakin, St Mathews Pry Sch; Osi Village, At Osi Village; Aba Asakin/Oke Oge /Ago Milla, Aba Asakin; Aba Asakin/Oke Oge/Ago Milla, At Oke Oge; Abusoro/Orojuda/Ajegunle, At Orojuda Village; Odudu/Ilado I & II, L. A Pry Sch Ilado; Palace Area/Market Area, At Isinigbo Market
Akure North	Iluabo/Eleyewo/Bolorunduro	Iluabo I & II, L. A Pry Sch; Iluabo III, At Iluabo III; Iluabo IV, At Iluabo IV; Eleyewo I, At Odo Ala; Eleyewo II, L. A Pry Sch; Eleyewo III & IV, At Eleyewo; Bolorunduro I, At Bolorunduro I; Bolorunduro II & III, At Bolorunduro II; Alayere, At Alayere
Akure North	Isimija/Irado	Afolabi Ologun/Peter Ojadua/Irado/Mission Rd, At Afolabi Ologuns House; St James Pry Sch/Asamo/Isale Abebi/Ipole Junction, St James Pry Sch; Aba Osolo, At Osolos House; Aba Alimi, At Alimis House; Odundun, At Adegbites House; Oke Iyanu/Oke-Bola/Abaipanisala/Oluwatedo/Olokuta/Adeseye, St Augustines Sch
Akure North	Moferere	Ikere Rd. I & II, At Olotas House; Omolewo Road I, II & III, At Omolewo Rd II; C. A. C Comm I/II/III Oke Atapara Area, C. A. C. Pry Sch; St Mathew I/II, St Mathew Pry Sch; St Mathew III, St Mathew Pry Sch; Chief Oyinlola I & II, At Chief Oyinlola House; Adamolekun I & II/Wema Bank I & II, At Chief Adamolekuns House
Akure North	Oba-Ile	First Gate, At First Gate; Second Gate, At Second Gate; Oke Igele, St Pauls Pry Sch; Oloba Junction, At Oloba Junction; Nta Road, At Agudas House; Osrc I, II & III, Post Office; Opp. Osrc Junction, Opp. Osrc Junction; Maternity I, At Maternity; Maternity II, Near Maternity; Owode Camp, At Owode; Araromi Village I & II, At Araromi
Akure North	Odo-Oja/Ijigbo	Odo-Oja, At Ogbolus Market; Odo Ule/Ogbontitun/Muslim Pry Sch, At Pa Ojos House; Aba Egbira/Opp Coop, At Aba Egbira Camp; K & S/Coop/Surulere/Dispensary/Odo Gada/Owena River Basin/Oke Ijigbo I & II, At Isaac Ogunmolas House; Abusoro, At Abusoro; Alayere/Alaroye, At Alayere
Akure North	Oke-Afa/Owode	L. A. Pry. Sch. I & II, L. A Pry Sch; C. A. C Pry. Sch. I & II, C. A. C Pry Sch; Rotimi St/Kele Store/Owode, Gabriel Ologuns House; St Anthony I & II, Iloro St/Irese Rd, At St Anthony Pry Sch; Post Office/Osolo Comp I & II At Oke Afa; Mofos House/Fadele Camp, At Mofos House
Akure North	Oke Iju	Ojugbese I & II/St Stephen II & III, At Chief Alajes House; Ijigbo I & II, Infront Of John Adebayos House; Opticum Centre/St Michael Area I & II, St Michaels Pry. Sch.; Optimcum Centre II, At Opticum Centre; Araoyinbo I & II/Agunla Iseri II, At Ibitoyes House; Isolu Camp/Aresun, Opp Baptist Church; Agunla/ Iseri I/Oke- Iju, Open Space Near Obas Market; Temidire Village/Ogbese, At Atewologun Camp; Ogbese Abodi /Camp, At Abodi Ogbese Camp; Olounta/ Omoloju Camp, At Olounta/ Omoloju Camp
Akure South	Aponmu	Lisa Camp, In Front Of Fadahunsis House; Oke Agbe Camp - In Front Of Oluwunmis House; Ita Oniyan/Adun, St. Carmels R. C. M Pry Sch; Ago Obe - In Front Of Obes House; Mile I3, In Front Of Ayodeles House; Aladodo Camp, In Front Of Tifases House; Olokuta, At Olokuta Junction; Opa Iwoye, At Ayetoros House; Iwoye Camp, St Stephens Pry Sch; Aponmu, Aponmu Comm. High Sch; Ago Akure, St Patricks Pry Sch; Ajegunle, St Michaels Pry Sch; Pilot Sawmill, Pilot Pry Sch; Ago Mattew, In Front Of Mattews House; Akobo, At Akobo Junction; Akobo, At Akobo Camp
Akure South	Gbogi/Isikan I	Temidayo I, Beside The Hospital; Temidayo II, Beside The Hospital; Ireakari Pry Sch, Ireakari Pry Sch; Fanibi Layout, Fanibi Layout Junction, Ondo Rd I; Fanibi Layout, Fanibi Layout Junction, Ondo Rd II; Coop Consumer, Opp Coop Motel; Army Pry Sch, Army High Sch I; Army Pry Sch, Army High Sch II; Sacred Heart, Sacred Heart Pry Sch I; Sacred Heart, Sacred Heart Pry Sch II; Jomo Motors, Jomo Motors; Danjuma, Beside Old Custom House; Honey Moon, Honey Moon Hotel Junction; Old Emprem Hotel (C. A. C Area); Agunloye, Beside Adedewe Pry Sch; Ajipowo, Beside Rccc Junction I; Ajipowo, Beside Rccc Junction II; Ajebamidele, Near Onyearugbulem Junction; St John/Mary Hospital, The Hospital Junction; Kisten Garden, Adebobajos House; Osabiyi Layout/Osabiyi Layout; Tutugbuwa I/Tutugbuwa /Danjuma Junction; Tutugbuwa II/Tutugbuwa /Danjuma Junction; St John Pry Sch, St John Pry Sch I; St John Pry Sch, St John Pry Sch II; Igboyegun, Igboyegun/Igbede Junction; Igboyegun, Igboyegun Ondo Road; St Thomas Church, Opp St Thomas Church; St Thomas Church, Car. St Thomas Church I; St Thomas Church, Car. St Thomas Church II; Eruoba, Beside Alade Photo; Eruoba, In Front Of Falades Compound; Iralepo Palace, At Ogunjobis House Near Dunamis Assembly; Iralepo Palace, Odi Olowo Street; Owonifari, Isikan Market; Owonifari, Owonifari Hotel Area
Akure South	Gbogi/Isikan II	Ayetutu, 2 Iluyos House Ayetutu; Ayetutu, 25 Odofin House; Ayetutu, National Bank, Albert Lane; Methodist, Ayetutu, Methodist Pry Sch; Methodist Pry Sch, In Front Of Mayeguns House; Ayetutu - Methodist Pry Sch; Ayetutu - C. A. C United High Sch I; Ayetutu - C. A. C United High Sch II; Ayetutu, C. A. C United High Sch III; Police Quarters - In Front Of Obadares Wifes House; Police Quarters - Nr. Wosem Church; Police Quarters - Dr. Olagbayes House; Police Quarters - Beside Police Quarters Okuta Elerinla; Police Quarters - Baptist Pry Sch; Champion Junction - Champion Junction; Ilesa Road - Mojere Market At The Front Of The Gate; Ilesa Road - Inside Mojere Market; Ilesa Road - Beside Fagbotes House; Ilesa Road -Akinyele - Martins Street; Oyotedo, Oyotedo Camp; Aule Camp; Iloyin Camp; Futa Gate; Futa Gate Akindeko Hall; Igunsin Camp
Akure South	Ijomu/Obanla	Obanla-C. S. S Bookshop; Oba Adesida Road-Iju/Itaogbolu, Motor Park; Oba Adesida Rd 3, Igan Str Front Of Ok Stores; Ijomu -Ajanas House; Ayetoro - Ayetoro Street I; Obanla - Badas House; St Stephens Pry Sch - St Stephens Pry Sch; Ijomu/Oke Ijebu Road - Oke Ijebu Supermarket; Ijomu/Oke Ijebu Road - Ojos Compound; Osisi Quarters - Ola Jombo House; Oke-Ijebu - Edo Lodge; Oke-Ijebu - Jakos Junction; Oke-Ijebu - Fibico Hotels; Oke-Ijebu/Osikoti - Akinjos House; Ijapo - Ijapo High Sch; Ijapo - Flagship Hotel; Ijapo - Recreation Centre; Ijapo - Cosmic Hotels; Ado Road- Testing Ground; Ado Road- Ap Filling Station
Akure South	Lisa	Ago Ireti - Near Ago Ireti; Ago Ireti - Mobil Petrol Station; Oba Ile Road - Mobil Petrol Station; Ebenezer Pry Sch- Ebenezer Pry Sch I; Ebenezer Pry Sch- Ebenezer Pry Sch II; Oke Lisa - Lisas House; Ayetoro St I - Ayetoro Street I; Ayetoro St II - Ayetoro Street II; Elemo Street - Elemo Compound; Ilemo Street - Near Odofins House; High Court - Adegoroyes Office; High Court - Near High Court; Near Nepa Office - Near Nepa Office; Near Nepa Office - Water Corporation; Near Nepa Office - Vertinary Clinic; Coop Training - Coop Training Comp I; Coop Training - Coop Training Comp II; Alagbaka Pry Sch - Alagbaka Pry Sch I; Alagbaka Pry Sch - Alagbaka Pry Sch II; Magistrate Court - Magistrate Court; School Of Nursing - Near School Of Nursing; Ala Police Station - Ala Police Station; Oda Road - Near Lacos House; Ala Quarters - At Ala Quarters; Ala Quarters - Sijuwade Junction; Abiodun Street - Near Abiodun House; Abiodun Street - At Abiodun Street; Oluwatuyi Rainbow - Near Rainbow; Oluwatuyi House - Near Oluwatuyi Market; Near Ijoka Coop Store, Coop Store; Ijoka Coop Store- Near Sawmill Coop Store; Elemuletu Pry Sch -Elemuletu Pry Sch I; Elemuletu Pry Sch -Elemuletu Pry Sch II; Ijo Mimo High Sch - Ijo Mimo High Sch
Akure South	Oda	Ago Ireti - Near Ago Ireti; Ago Ireti - Mobil Petrol Station; Oba Ile Road - Mobil Petrol Station; Ebenezer Pry Sch- Ebenezer Pry Sch I; Ebenezer Pry Sch- Ebenezer Pry Sch II; Oke Lisa - Lisas House; Ayetoro St I - Ayetoro Street I; Ayetoro St II - Ayetoro Street II; Elemo Street - Elemo Compound; Ilemo Street - Near Odofins House; High Court - Adegoroyes Office; High Court - Near High Court; Near Nepa Office - Near Nepa Office; Near Nepa Office - Water Corporation; Near Nepa Office - Vertinary Clinic; Coop Training - Coop Training Comp I; Coop Training - Coop Training Comp II; Alagbaka Pry Sch - Alagbaka Pry Sch I; Alagbaka Pry Sch - Alagbaka Pry Sch II; Magistrate Court - Magistrate Court; School Of Nursing - Near School Of Nursing; Ala Police Station - Ala Police Station; Oda Road - Near Lacos House; Ala Quarters - At Ala Quarters; Ala Quarters - Sijuwade Junction; Abiodun Street - Near Abiodun House; Abiodun Street - At Abiodun Street; Oluwatuyi Rainbow - Near Rainbow; Oluwatuyi House - Near Oluwatuyi Market; Near Ijoka Coop Store, Coop Store; Ijoka Coop Store- Near Sawmill Coop Store; Elemuletu Pry Sch -Elemuletu Pry Sch I; Elemuletu Pry Sch -Elemuletu Pry Sch II; Ijo Mimo High Sch - Ijo Mimo High Sch
Akure South	Odopetu	Arakale - 92, Asamos House; Arakale - I6b Ijemikins House; Arakale - 82 Arakale Street; Arakale -92 Ojumus House; Arakale -Oda Garage, In Front Of Aromed; Arakale -57b Mayfare; Odopetu - 40, Odopetu House; Odopetu - I08, Faloye Workshop; Odopetu - St Martins Pry Sch; Odopetu - 2, Ogunleyes House; Odopetu - I9 Odige Street, Akure; Odopetu - I4a Odige Street, Akure; Odopetu - 70 Okearata Street; Igboliki - I9 Otutubiosun; Idiagbatitun - I, Owodunni Street Down The Street; Idiagbatitun - 43 Oke Padre Near Lao; Idiagbatitun At Owodunni Street In Front Of Cont. Hotel; Idiagbatitun - 27a Ajegunle Street, Akure; Idiagbatitun -3I, Femisoro, Medayese Pry Sch; Idiagbatitun -L. A II Pry Sch; Idiagbatitun - 35 Ifelodun St Akure; Idiagbatitun - II, Ibikunle Lane; Idiagbatitun - Ia, Temidire; Idiagbatitun - Ireakari/I4 Ejioba Lane
Akure South	Oke Aro/Uro I	Idanre Road -Oke Aro Police Station; Idanre Road -Iloro Market; St Francis Pry Sch - St Francis Pry Sch; St Francis Pry Sch - Gaga Comm. Pry Sch; Freeman Dr. Sch - Freeman Dr. Sch; Freeman Dr. Sch - Road Block; Adofure Camp - Adofure Pry Sch; Adofure Camp - Olupelu House; Obodulu - Near Muslim College; Motor Park - Idanre Motor Park; Surulere - Adu Memorial Sch; Akure Sec. Comm - Akure Sec. Comm; Aladiro Road - In Front Of Ch. Fayehun House; Iloro Pry Sch. - Iloro Pry Sch; Iba Furniture - Iba Furniture; Alafe Street - In Front Of Alafes House; Odo Sae Road - In Front Of Asaes House; Idiroko Street - St John Pry Sch; Oke Aro Street - Near Ch. Aro Olotu Palace; Isikin Street - Near Chief Olusikins House; Odole Street - Near Chief Odoles House; Jeje Street - No I Jeje Street; Oke Aro - Chief Adebowales House; Adebowale Street - Chief Akoguns House; Oke Aro Street - Dexo Funiture; Arisoyin Street - Ibi Press House; Surulere Street - Oke Aro Maternity; Ilupeju Street - 20 Ilupeju Street; Arisoyin Street -St Thomas High School; Oke-Aro Titun - Saka Olugosi House; Basiri Community - Near C. A. C Oke Basiri; Alafe - A. L. C. A. C Oke Alafia Junction
Akure South	Oke Aro/Uro II	C. A. C Sch Area - C. A. C Pry Sch; C. A. C Pry Sch Area - C. A. C Pry Sch; Eleye Street - St Joseph Pry Sch I; Eleye Street - St Joseph Pry Sch II; Irowo Street - I, Irowo Street; Irowo Street - Irowo Junction; Little By Little Photo - Little By Little Photo; Irowo Street - Little By Little Photo; Iwalewa Street - Iwalewa Street; Iwalewa Street - Alafiatayo Street; Irowo Quarters - Alafiatayo Street; Aquinas - Aquinas College; Aquinas - Opposite State Hospital; Cash Hold Area - Cash Hold Chemist; Cash Hold Area - In Front Of Adegoroyes House; Fadeyi Junction - Fadeyi Street; Fadeyi Area- Fadeyi Junction; Falodun Junction - At Falodun Junction; Falodun Area - In Front Of Adesida House; Igbo Church Area -Opposite Igbo Church; Igbo Church Area - Iro Titun Pry Sch; Femi Adekanye Street - Opposite Femi Adekanyes House; Femi Adekanye Street - In Front Of Adekanyes House; Irepodun - St. Michaels College; Only Jesus Can Save - Opposite Only Jesus Can Save; Only Jesus Can Save Area - In Front Of Only Jesus Can; Oke Obere - Oke Obere Village; Igisogba - At Igisogba Village; Eyinke - At Eyinke Street
Akure South	Oshodi/1solo	Town Hall - Town Hall; Osolo Market - Osolo Market; Oshodi Market - Oshodi Market I; Oshodi Market - Oshodi Market II; Slaughter Slab - Slaughter Slab; St Anthony Pry Sch - St Anthony Pry Sch I; St Anthony Pry Sch - St Anthony Pry Sch II; Imuagun Street - Imuagun Titun; Seminary - 107 Ajaye Street; Akure High Sch - Akure High Sch I; Akure High Sch - Akure High Sch II; New Stadium - Beside New Stadium; Sabo Odojoka - Sabo Odojoka; Hausa Community - Near Hausa Comm. Mosque; Odokoyi Street- 107 Odokoyi Street; Salvation Army Pry Sch; Akosile Junction - Salvation Army Pry School; Olukoyi Palace - In Front Of Olukoyis Palace; Adesida/1solo, Beside Paradise Hotel; Abiribi Lane, At Abiribi Lane; Osolo Palace, Front Of Osolo Palace; Open Space At Plaza Hotel Road; Plaza Hotel Area, Front Of Plaza Hotal; New Isolo Pry Sch, New Isolo Pry Sch; Shagari Village, Anglican Pry Sch; Diplomate Area, Opp Diplomate Hotel (A); Diplomate Hotel Area, Front Of Oluwafemis; Onyearugbulem Mkt (A); Irese Road, Opp Gospel Faith Mission; Okesi, At Okesi Village; Ayayemi At Ayeyemi
Akure South	Owode/1muagun	Oba Odesida Road - 105 Oba Adesida Road; Eringbo/Egbedi/Eringbo; Imuagun - 28 Imuagun Street Akure; L. A Pry Sch - L. A Pry Sch; National Library - National Library; Irokun - 71 Irokun Street; Tuyi - 22 Tuyi Street; Fabusuyi - II Fabusuyi Street; Ayedun - 50 Ayedun Street; St Peter Pry Sch - St Peter Pry Sch; Leo Hospital - Opposite Leo Hospital; Ipinsa - St Augustine Ipinsa; St Dominic Gram. School - St Dominic Gram. School; O. D. R. C Junction At Orita - Obele Junction Akure; Ilere Odo-1lere Odo Camp; Oba Adesida Rd, Oba Adesida Rd; Egbedi - Egbedi; Imuagun - 28 Ayedun Imuagun; L. A Pry Sch - 5b Opopoola Street; National Library - Osho Street, Akure; Irokun - Opposite Olowokere Hotel; Ayedun - 24 Makanjuola St, Ayedun; Fabusuyi Street - II Fabusuyi Street (Opposite); Ayedun - 22 Ajisola Street, Ayedun; St Peters Pry Sch - St Peters Pry Sch; Leo Hospital - Leo Junction; St Dominic - Shola Amure Street; Odrc Junction - Opposite Odrc Junction; Eringbo/Egbedi - 3 Ijofi Street, Akure; Imuagun - 10 Olorunbe Street; L. A Pry Sch - 7 Stadium Road; Irokin - 6 Ajayi Street; Ayedun Ala Junction; Leo Hospital - Leo Aladiye
Ese-Odo	Apoi I	L. A Sch Igbekebo; Open Space At Harrison; R. C. M Sch Igbekebo I; R. C. M Igbekebo II; Open Space At Lekki; Open Space At White Sand Osari; Open Space At Koni Igangbo; Open Space At Arulewo; Open Space At Katuri; Open Space At Nanagha; R. C. M School Ojuala; Open Space At At Ebinis Ojuala; Comm. Pry School Apoi Zion; Comm. Pry School Quarters Apoi Zion
Ese-Odo	Apoi II	L. A Sch Kiribo; Methodist Sch Kiribo; Open Space Olukus Camp; R. C. M At Idumado Quarter Kiribo; R. C. M Sch Kiribo; Open Space At Erinor Kiribo; Open Space At Ojigbogbene; Methodist Sch Gbeleju-Oke; Methodist Sch Gbeleju-Odo; Open Space At Itungbaran; R. C. M Sch Ipoke; R. C. M Sch Ipoke Dina Quarters; Open Space At Olomu Hall, Ipoke
Ese-Odo	Apoi II1	Methodist School Igbotu; F. A. C Sch Igbotu; Open Space At Ita-Odogbo; Open Space Near Nekunbes House; Open Space At Igbotu Atijo; Methodist Sch Sabomi; Open Space At Akinyemis Sabomi; L. A Pry Sch Igirikile; L. A Sch Okorogbene; Open Space At L. G Dispensary; Methodist Sch Oboro; Open Space Near Co-Operative Sabomi; Open Space At Ibinkunles House Oboro; Baptist Sch Enikorogha; Nursery Sch Enikorogha; Open Space Near Ayeduns Oboro
Ese-Odo	Apoi IV	Open Space Near Ayenis House Igbobini; Open Space At Late Akinmusayo Igbobini; Open Space At Olowosogas Igbobini; Salvation Army Sch Igbobini; Open Space At Onisoosi Camp; Open Space At Solomons Camp; Methodist Sch Mobi Camp
Ese-Odo	Apoi V	Methodist Sch Igbobini; Open Space At Okes House, Igbobini; Open Space At Adeaduwo I; Open Space At Abisagbos House Igbobini; Apostolic Sch Igbobini; R. C. M Sch Oluagbo; Open Space At Epewe; Open Space At Lakerekes
Ese-Odo	Arogbo I	F. A. C Sch Arogbo; L. A Sch Agwobiri I; L. A Sch Agwobiri II; R. C. M Sch Arogbo I; R. C. M Sch Arogbo II; R. C. M Sch Gbamila; Open Space At Oke Shilo; Open Space At Kekemeke Arogbo; Open Space Agadagba-Obon; Open Space Orisatu; L. A Sch Amapere; L. A Sch New Jerusalem; Open Space Ojejekubu; L. A Sch Opugbene; Open Space Ojogo House; Open Space Tubugbene
Ese-Odo	Arogbo II	R. C. M School Ori-Eran; L. A Sch Olomopupa; L. A Sch Ago-Eri; Open Space At Ago-Eri; L. A Sch Ogidigba I; L. A Sch Ogidigba II; Open Space At Agokiri; L. A Sch Ebibote I; Comm Sch Opubablebu; L. A Sch Awodikora; L. A Sch Didigbene; L. A Sch Eweribubogho
Ese-Odo	Arogbo III	L. A Sch Biagbeni; C/S Sch Urousoama; Open Space Okanminiwei; Comm Gram Sch Biagbani; L. A Sch Agbedigbaran; Open Space At Pelebosolo; Comm Sch Jeribeni; L. A Sch Adolosemo I; Open Space Atgboibo; L. A Sch Adolosemo III; Open Space At Adolosemo II; Comm. Sch Adolosemo IV; Open Space At Lalane
Ese-Odo	Ukparama I	U. G. S Bolowogho; L. A Sch Bolowogho; Open Space At Jermines Bolowogho; L. A Sch Ukpe; Open Space Dababilebu; Open Space, At Akojes House Ukpe; Open Space At Menus House Ukpe; Comm Sch Tamaraebi; L. A Sch Pina-Ama
Ese-Odo	Ukparama II	Open Space At Ajagbinis House; Open Space At Tominewei House; F. A. C Akpata; Open Space At Bejis House Opuba; Comm Sch Tamarabotei; Open Space Ojudo-Ama; Open Space Akekes House, Opuba; Baptist Sch Opuba; Open Space At Supporters Opuba; Baptist Sch Oyeme Opuba; F. A. C Sch Ajapa; Open Space At Agbojule Camp; Opuba High Sch Ajapa; L. A Sch Amatnibi
Idanre	Ala-Elefosan	St Patrick Area, St Patrick Sch, Odeja; Ala Elefosan, St Michaels Sch, Ala-Elefosan; Ala-Elefosan, St Michael Sch, A/E/Alagoke; Ajagbusi Area, Methodist Sch Ajagbusi; Ominiyan Ago Ogenijebu; Ominiyan/Ago Ogenijebu - St Stephen Ominyan; Anukansugba, Open Space Anukansugba; Aisin/Ajebamibo, Methodist Pry Sch, Ajebamibo; Ajegunle/Orunbato, Pry Sch Ajegunle; Ajebamidele, O/S At Ademoye H/S Ajebamidele; Ipinlerere/Baale Ojumu, Methodist Pry Sch, Ipinlerere; Gbalegi, L. A Pry Sch Gbalegi; Ajipowo/Ijadakinro, O/Space At Ijadakinro
Idanre	Alade/Atosin	Atosin Township, Oke Aluko L. A Pry Sch, Atosin Oke Aluko; Oke-Anifon, Youth Centre Atosin; Idi Agba, Idi Agba Hall; Tejugbola, Tejugbola; Ilako Camp, O/Space At Ilako Camp; Aseigbo I & II, St Thomas Pry Sch Aseigbo; Lafere/Agbajo - Idanre H/Sch, Alade; Oke-Imikan, Open Space Opposite Aladeokun Comp; St Andrews Area, Youth Centre Alade; Market Road, Maternity Centre Alade; Okelisa/Oke Agunla, O/Space Beside Lisa Camp; Temidire/Ayo/Oloruntedo/Okedo, O/S In Front Of Jones House; Akinjo/Oguntugbiyele/Oba Akinboro, St Theresa Pry Sch, Alade; Office Rd/Court/Ilebukun, O/S Near Court Hall; Ipoba Ojomu Sch, St Lukes Pry Sch; Ipoba Sama/Olu/Ajebambo, O/S At Ipoba, Ajebambo
Idanre	Idale-Lemikan	Idale Lemikan, L. A Sch, Otapete; Okejebu Area, St Stephens African Sch, Okejebu; Okotiebor, O/Space Oko-Tiebor; Kayodes Compound, O/Space At Ogenijebu; Biodun Akinkuowo Area, St Michael Sch Yaba; Odole Area, Open Space At Ojota; Opasorun, St James Pry Sch, Opasorun; Arapa-Laogbo, St Edwards Okeipa I & II; Labuwa, L. A Sch, Labuwa; Omilifon, L. A Sch, Omilifon
Idanre	Idale-Logbosere	Idale Yaba, Motor Park, Yaba; Idale Yaba II, O/S At Orosun Compound; Fesola Area, O/Space At Fesolas; Olofin Gramm Sch I & II, Olofin Grammar School Gate; Adebayos Comp., Open Space In Front Of Adebayo Comp.; St. Pauls Area, St. Paul Primary School; Methodist Primary School Area, Methodist Primary School Idale; Owoeye Area, O/Space In Front Of Owoeye; Odoewu/Onipanu, O/Space At Ago Onipanu; Bajare, L. A Sch Bajare; Ubi, O/Space At Ubi; Agotitun, L. A Sch, Agotitun; Igbelowowa, Methodist Pry Sch, Igbelowowa
Idanre	Ijomu/Isurin	Ijomu/Bat Area, Youth Centre, Odode; Odo Oghwa, Open Space At Bolutayo; Obatedo/Odoko/Obamotula Open Space At Batedo I & II; Abababubu, St Peters Sch, Abababubu; Eripose, L. A Pry Sch, Erinpose; Ijama, L. A Pry Sch Ijama; Abalaka, St. Davids Sch, Abalaka; Ayefemi / Ajegunle
Idanre	Irowo	Irowo Oshinle/ Old Reading Room, Old Reading Room; Masaal Asi/Igbatoyo, O/Space Infront Of Ademuleguns House; St Georges Area/Ogunduyi St Georges Pry Sch; Methodist High Sch Area, Methodist High Sch Area; Okedo, St Josephs C. A. C Okedo; Akinkuade/Ajijala, O/Space Infront Of Ajijala; Awo I & II, Open Space At Awo Abode
Idanre	Isalu Ehinpeti	Lisa Olatunji Area, O/S At Lisa Olatunjis H/S I; Lisa Olatunji Area, O/S At Lisa Olatunjis H/S II; Akinnayajo Area, C. S. A, O/S C. S. A Store; Commander/Duyile/Akinnuwesi, O/S Commanders House; Utaja, St Michael Pry Sch, Utaja; Aribigbola/Owomofewa Comp., L. A Sch, Owomofewa; Ago Joshua L. A Sch, Ago Joshua; Iramuje/Commander Comp, Pry Sch Iramuje; Ajegunle/Iwonja, Methodist Sch, Ajegunle; Omilaje/Comp, L. A Sch Omilaje; Owena Egbeda Comp, St Lukes Egbeda; Ugbepo/Ago Aruwajoye, St Davids, Ugbepo; Oke Ago/Abata Ago, O/S At Oke Ago
Idanre	Isalu Jigbokin	Isalu Jigbokin, Christ Sch I; Isalu Jigbokin, Christ Sch. II; Isalu Jigbokin, Methodist Pry Sch I; Isalu Jigbokin, Methodist Pry Sch II; Ojajigbokin, O/S In Front Of Abana I & II; Apefon Area, O/S At Apefon; Itanorowo, St Colmans Sch, Asoko; Jiye Camp, O/Space At Jiye, Awaye; Agbajo Area, Pry Sch Agbajo; Agabielesin, O/S At Agabi Elesin; Ugbo-Olokun, O/S At Ugbolokun
Idanre	Ofosu/Onisere	Ofosu Area, L. A Sch, Ofosu; Patrick Area, Open Space At Ofosu; Farm Settlement I & II, L. A Sch Farm Settlement; Owobamibo Area, O/S At Owobamibo; Erijo, Open Space At Erijo; Elebiseghe I & II, O/Space At Elebiseghe; Oniseere I & II, St Peters Oniseere; Omifunfun, O/Space At Omifunfun; Jimgbe, L. A. School At Jimgbe; Oniyewu, O/Space At Oniyewu; Legbira, O/Space At Legbira I & II
Idanre	Owena/Aponmulona	Aiyetoro / Owena I; Aiyetoro / Owena II; Aiyetoro Owena/Ipinlerere, O/S At Ipinerere; Aponmulona, Open Space At Aponmu Lona; Olokuta, Open Space Infront Of Asimekuns High Sch Olokuta; Gberiwojo/Onikokodiya, Open Space At Onikokodiya; Aboekan, Open Space At Aboekan; Ajegunle Akindana, L. A Sch Akindana; Itaolorun/Iloro I & II, L. A Sch, Itaolorun; Ipoba I & II, Open Space At Ipoba I
Ifedore	Ero/Ibuji/Mariwo	St. Michael Sch. Ero, St. Michael Pry. Sch. Ero; In Front Of Obas Palace, Open Space In Front Of Obas Palace Ero; Ohunawe Street Ero, Open Space In Front Of Ohunawes House, Ero; Eyesaji Street, Ero, In Front Of Eyesajis House, Ero; Oke Owode/Sasere Street, Ero, Open Space In Front Of Saseres House Ero; C. M. S Ibuji, St Mathias Pry Sch, Ibuji; Dispensary Ibuji, Dispensary Ibuji I; Dispensary Ibuji, Dispensary Ibuji II; Mariwo, Old L. G Office Mariwo
Ifedore	Igbaka-Oke I	Imokuta Osunla St, Igbara-Oke, Open Space Imokuta Osunla, Igbara-Oke; Awaye Igbara-Oke, Better Life Igbara-Oke; Nepa Office Igbara-Oke, Open Space Nepa Office Igbara-Oke; Court Hall Igbara-Oke, Court Hall Igbara-Oke; St Pauls Pry Sch Igbara-Oke, St Pauls Pry Sch Igbara-Oke I; St Pauls Pry Sch Igbara-Oke, St Pauls Pry Sch Igbara-Oke II; In Front Of Chief Tamales House Igbara-Oke, Open Space In Front Of Chief Tamales House Igbara-Oke; St Anthonys Pry Sch, St Anthonys Pry Sch Igbaka-Oke; Osoloro Comp, Open Space Osoloro Comp, Igbaka-Oke; Comm Pry Sch Molete, Comm Pry Sch Molete; Molete: In Front Of Makindes House; Olafare Comp, Open Space Olafare Comp Igbara Oke; Osoruns House, Open Space Osoruns Comp Igbara Oke; St Pauls Church/Sajowa Comp, O/S In Front Of Ayegbo High Sch; St Pauls Church/Sajowa Comp, O/S In Front Of Sajowas Comp; Post Office: In Front Of Post Office; Motor Park Obada, L. G Office Igbara-Oke; Aros Compound, Open Space In Front Of New Palace; Elemos Compound, Open Space Opposite Elemos Compound; Temporary Palace: Open Space In Front Of Old Palace; Sapetu Igese, Open Space Sapetu Igese; Orunifi Comp, O/S Along Orunifi Street; Isogan, Open Space In Olowolagbas Comp; Isogan, Open Space In Front Of Alejos Comp; Onigemo Lane: In Front Of Olakiitans House; Surulere/Oke Igele: In Front Of Elemikans House
Ifedore	Igbaka-Oke II	St Josephs Pry Sch, St Josephs Pry Sch Igbara-Oke; Coop Store, Open Space Coop Store Igbara Oke; Coop Store, Open Space Coop Store I Oke; St. Joseph Pry. School, St. Joseph Pry. School Igbara-Oke; L. G. Pry Sch: L. G Pry Sch. Igbara-Oke; Apostolic Pry. Sch, Apostolic Pry. Sch Igbara Oke; Apostolic Pry. Sch. I Oke; Apos Pry Sch. Igbara-Oke; St. Stephens Pry. School, St. Stephens Pry. School Igbara-Oke; C. A. C. Pry Sch. Igbara Oke; C. A. C Pry Sch; Agbaajo/Asae: In Front Of Agbaajos House; Odode Orimogagun: In Front Of Orimogaguns House
Ifedore	Ijare I	Odo Esi; Motor Park, Ijare I; Odo Esi; Motor Park Ijare II; Old Dispensary/Odo Mogun: Old Dispensary, Ijare; Enock Saloro: Open Space Saloro Comp. Junction; Oja Oba, Open Space Obanla Comp Junction; Ayetoro/Ogbontitun, St Marys Pry Ijare I; Ayetoro/Ogbontitun, St Marys Pry Ijare II; Adejuwons Comp, St David Pry, Ijare; Post Office, Post Office, Ijare I; Post Office, Post Office, Ijare II; Oloriawo Comp, Open Space Oloriawo, Comp II; Youth Centre, Youth Centre Ijare; Ang. Gram Sch/Ugoda, Ang Gram Sch, Ijare; Uye,, New Maternity Ijare
Ifedore	Ijare II	Oluwajana/Olauyi Comp, Odo Oja Olo-Gbosere Junction; Ago Balogun Comp, Open Space Ita Balogun Junction; Isare, Open Space At Arigidi Junction; Elemoso/Elemo, O/S At Orita Junction; Adegboye/Okeruku/Fadipe, Open Space At Fadipes House; Adegboye/Okeruku/Fadipe, Open Space At Adegboye House; Akinola Ayalodi Comp, St Peters Pry Sch Ijare; Osanyinbi Comp, Open Space Coop Store
Ifedore	Obo/Ikota/Olo-Gbo	Ikota, Open Space At Ikota; Ikota, Ikota Square; Araromi Obo, Holy Trinity Obo Araromi; Aaye, Open Space At Aaye; Irese, St Davids Pry Sch Irese I; Irese, St Davids Pry Sch Irese II; Ologbosere/Oreseun, Open Space At Oreseun; Eti, Open Space At Eti
Ifedore	Ilara I	Opokiti/Igbehin Ilara Mokin, O/S At Yusuf Adejugbes House; Fagbolagun Comp, O/S At Fagbolagun House Ilara; Afarioguns Comp, In Front Of Afarioguns House Ilara; Saos Comp, Open Space At Rogbitans House; Oke Ode Comp, O/S At Apotis House Ilara; Olisikin/Ekila Comp, O/S At Ojuopes House, Ilara; Adegbenros Comp, O/S At Ojuopes House, Ilara; Fakinlede/Pojo Comp., Open Space At Pojos House, Ilara; Ohunorun Comp, O/S At Adefehinti House Ilara; Elegiri/Edimo Comp, O/S At Elegiri House, Ilara I; Elegiri/Edimos Comp, O/S At Elegiri House, Ilara II; Okeruku Comp, O/S At Ojumu Falohun House; Onisogun Camp, Post Office Ilara; Iro/Fagbadegun, O/S At Fagbadeguns House; Saos Comp, The Apostolic Iro; Opalemos Comp, O/S At Late Odofins House; Sarukus Comp, Comprehensive High Sch, Ilara
Ifedore	Ilara II	Odofin/Igbehin Adaramoyes Comp, O/S At Odoguns House, Ilara I; Afunbiokin Comp, In Front Of New Palace, Ilara; Afunbiokun Comp, In Front Of New Palace, Ilara; Okeruku Comp, Apostolic Pry Sch, Ilara; Saseres Comp, O/S At Osogbons House, Ilara; Ipeti/Afunbiokin Area, O/S At Ogunlades House, Ilara; Fagbolagun/Ajana Comp, O/S At Ajanas House, Ilara; Elemo Fakayejo, O/S At Sasere Fakinledes House, Ilara; Agbajo Comp, O/S At Ayilaran Agbajos House, Ilara; Oluwaseunres Comp, O/S At Seunres House, Ilara; Ayeguns House, O/S At Ayeguns House, Ilara; Adekolas Comp, O/S At Adekolas Comp, Ilara I; Adekolas Comp, O/S At Adekolas Comp, Ilara II; Police Station/Logbosere Comp, O/S In Front Of Ojuope Cocoa Store; Agun/Saruku Area, O/S At Aguns House, Ilara I; Agun/Saruku Area, O/S At Aguns House, Ilara II; St Peter/Okeawo Comp, O/S At Ojuokos House, Ilara; Lisas Comp, St Andrews Pry Sch, Ilara; Irepodun/Agbelese Comp, O/S In Front Of Agbeleses House Owena Abatitun
Ifedore	Ipogun/Ibule	St Judes Pry Sch, Ipogun, St Judes Pry Sch, Ipogun; Ayo Road, Open Space At Adepotis House, Ipogun; Obada Mkt., Ipogun, Open Space Obada Mkt, Ipogun; St Peters Sch, Ipogun, St Peters Sch, Ipogun; Ajegunle St, Ipogun, Open Space At Ausis House, Ipogun; Ajegunle St, Ipogun, At Ausis House, Ipogun; Ayelabola Comp. Ipogun, Open Space Ayelabola House, Ipogun; Ayelabola Rd II, Ipogun, Open Space At Late Odopetus House I; Ayelabola Rd II, Ipogun, Open Space At Late Odopetus House II; St. Davids Primary Sch, Ibule-St. David, Ibule I; St. Davids Primary Sch, Ibule-St. David, Ibule II; Olubule Comp Ibule O/S Under Odan Tree I; Olubule Comp Ibule O/S Under Odan Tree II; Imogun Ibule: Better Life, Ibule I; Imogun Ibule: Better Life, Ibule II; Oke Iwoye/Isae Ibule: O/S At Oke Iwoye, Ibule I; Oke Iwoye/Isae Ibule: O/S At Oke Iwoye, Ibule II
Ifedore	Isarun/ Erigi	Bolorunduro I, St Peters Pry Bolorunduro I; Bolorunduro II, Health Centre Bolorunduro II; Araromi I, O/S In Front Of Baale Comp; Olorunda, L. A Pry Sch Olorunda; Owode Owena, L. A Pry Sch Owode Owena I; Owode Owena, Motor Park Owode Owena I; Ajebamidele, L. A Pry Sch Ajebamidele; Onijaka Elemo, O/S At Elemo Camp; Onijaka, O/S In Front Of Baales House, Onijaka; Amutere, O/S At Baale Comp, Amutere; Isarun Township, St Lukes Pry Sch, Isarun; Isarun Township, Near Mosque, Isarun; Isarun Township, Open Space Infront Of Palace; Odi Olowu: In Front Of Baales House; Erigi Obele: Comm. Primary School; Osinsin Camp, O/S Osinsin Camp; Ilopo Camp, O/S Ilopo Camp; Olorunda: In Front Of Baales House; Onijaka: In Front Of Baales House
Ilaje	Aheri	Pepe/ Igbobi, L. A Sch Pepe; Igbobi Open Space In Igbobi; Obinehin, F. A. C Pry Sch Obinehin; Agbala Obinehin Community Primary School Agbala; Idigbengben, L. A Pry Sch Idigbengben; Oke Siri I, Comm Pry Sch Oke Siri I; Oke Siri II, Comm Pry Sch Oke Siri II; Okesiri III, Open Space Oke Igbala Street Oke Siri; Ajegunle Erunama La School Ajegunle Erunama I; Ajegunle Erunama La School Ajegunle Erunama II; Araromi Seaside I, L. A Sch Araromi Seaside I; Araromi Sea Side II, L. A School Araromi Sea Side II; Araromi Seaside III, Open Space At Oke Anu; Holy Centre L. A School Holy Centre; Oke Ewa Open Space At Oke Ewa; Temidire Open Space At Temidire; Agerige I Grammar School Agerige; Agerige II/ Grammar School Agerige; Agerige III/ Near Palace Agerige; Ilefunfun/ La School Ilefunfun; Agbala Olopemeji/ Ang. Pry School Agbala; Akata/Mofehintokun: F. A. C Pry School Akata; Oke Ipare: C & S Pry School Oke Ipare; Alape Junction: Open Space Alape Junction; Zion Pepe I, L. A School Zion Pepe I; Zion Pepe II, L. A School Zion Pepe II; Zion Pepe III Community Grammar School Zion Pepe
Ilaje	Etikan	Ode Etikan I, Ang Pry Sch Ode Etikan; Ode Etikan II, Ang Pry Sch Ode Etikan; Ode Etikan III, Behind Dffri Well Ode Etikan; Ode Eti0kan IV Near Palace Ode Etikan; Ode Etikan V Near Ch. Ayemos House Ikoyi Etikan; Moferere, Open Space At Moferere; Ayetitun I Community Primary School Ayetitun; Ayetitun II Community Primary School Ayetitun; Okonla I C & S Primary School Okonla; Okonla II C & S Primary School Okonla; Ago Festus, Near Baales Comp Ago Festus
Ilaje	Mahin I	Ode Mahin I, Near Dadewos Compound Mahin; Ode Mahin II, Open Space At Asogbons Compound, Mahin; Ode Mahin III, Near Asarons House, Mahin; Ode Mahin IV, Near Akin Francis House, Mahin; Odemahin V, Near Ikuomolas House, Mahin; Ode Mahin VI, In Front Of F A O Omowoles House, Mahin; Ode Mahin VII, In Front Of Jadigbas House, Mahin; Ode Mahin VIII, Open Space At Teacher Olokos House, Mahin; Oropo I, Pry Sch Oropo; Oropo II, Open Space At Oropo; Legboro, Near Pa Sams House Legboro; Piawe, La School Piawe; Korolo, Near Pa Korolos House, Korolo; Ibila I, Zion C & S Pry Sch, Ibila; Ibila II, Zion C & S Pry Sch, Ibila; Legha, La School Legha; Seluwa, Open Space At Abuwo Comp, Seluwa; Ojan, Near Baales House Ojan; Asisa I, F. A. C Pry Sch Asisa; Asisa II, F. A. C Pry Sch Asisa; Magbehinwa, Community Pry School Magbehinwa; Peteinu, Near Baales Comp, Peteinu; Gbabijo I, Near Ayenuberus House Gbabijo; Gbabijo II, F. A. C Pry Sch Gbabijo; Gbabijo III, F. A. C Pry Sch Gbabijo; Gbabijo IV, In Front Of Billy S House Gbabijo; Gbabijo V, In Front Of Atiles House Gbabijo; Oroyomi, Near Ekujimis Comp Oroyomi; Odun Oloja, Open Space At Ogunbayos House Odun Oloja; Odun Ogun, La School Odun Ogun; Kugbanre, F A C Pry School Kugbanre; Seja Oke, Near Z. Odiyeyes House Seja Oke; Seja Odo I, F A C Pry School Seja Odo; Seja Odo II, In Front Of Olorun Lanas Compound Seja Odo; Aruwayo, In Front Of Baales House Aruwayo; Odun Orimoloye, Open Space At Ojo Ades Compound Odun Orimoloye
Ilaje	Mahin II	Orioke Iwamimo I: Comm Gram Sch, Orioke Iwamimo; Orioke Iwamimo II: L. A Sch Orioke Iwamimo; Orioke Iwamimo III: L. A Sch Orioke Iwamimo; Orioke Iwamimo IV: Near Palace Orioke Iwamimo; Orioke Iwamimo V: Open Space At Orioke Iwamimo; Maran: Near Baales Comp Maran; Ramasilo: L. A Sch Ramasilo; Ogogoro Zion I: Comm Pry. Sch. Ogogoro Zion; Ogogoro Zion II: Comm Pry. Sch. Ogogoro Zion; Ogogoro I: L. A Sch. Ogogoro; Ogogoro II: La Sch. Ogogoro; Ogogoro III: Open Space At Edemas House Ogogoro; Ogogoro IV: Open Space At Ogungbures House Ogogoro; Ogogoro V: Open Space At Ogogoro; Abeoroyo La Sch.: Abeoroyo; Abealala I United School: Abealala; Abealala II United School: Abealala; Abealala III: Open Space At Baale Comp. Abealala; Abealala IV: Open Space At Aworetans House Abealala; Abealala Seaside: Open Space Abealala Sea Side; Ebute Ipare I: R. C. M Ebute Ipare; Ebute Ipare II: Open Space At Ikuejamoyes House Ebute Ipare; Motoro I: St. Johns Pry. Sch. Motoro; Motoro II: Open Space Near Baales Comp. Motoro; Etugbo I : F A Pry. Sch., Etugbo; Etugbo II: Open Space At Baales Comp. Etugbo; Etugbo III: Open Space At Agbojules Comp. Etugbo; Oke Etugbo: Near Pa Majoluwas Comp. Oke Etugbo; Oke Silo: Comm. Pry. School Oke Silo; Abereke: C & S Pry. School Abereke; Mogbojuri: Open Space At Mogbojuri Beach; Ereke I: Ang. School Ereke; Ereke II: Ang. School Ereke; Ereke III: Ang. School Ereke; Omojuwa, Open Space At Omojuwa
Ilaje	Mahin III	Ominira Street Near No. 2I Omonira St. Igbokodo; Ilara/Calabar Camp, Surulere Pry. School Igbokoda; Ikuomola St, Near No. 45 Ikuomola St. Igbokoda; Holy Trinity School, Holy Trinity Pry Sch Igbokoda; Broad Street, I7 Broad Street Igbokoda; Okunnuwa, Open Space At Lebile Comp, Igbokoda; Larada I, Near No. I4 Larada St Igbokoda; Larada II, Near No. 34 Larada St Igbokoda; Araromi, Open Space At Araromi Igbokoda; College Road I, Customary Court Igbokoda; College Road II, Ilaje High Sch. Igbokoda; College Road III, Ilaje High Sch. Igbokoda; Secretariat Road, Local Govt. Secretariat Igbokoda; Okoga, O/S At Alawadas Naris House Igbokoda; Market Str. Near I8 Market Str. Igbokoda; Kelema Zion, Open Space At Kelema Zion; Ago Doroh, Open Space At Ago Dorohs House; Ilusosi, Open Space At Ilusosi; Igbokoda Zion I, C & S Pry Sch Zion Igbokoda; Igbokoda Zion II, St. Moses C & S School Zion Igbokoda; Iloro, Open Space At Iloro; Kurugbene I, Comm Pry Sch Kurugbene; Kurugbene II, Comm Pry Sch Kurugbene; Aboto I, Christ Ang School Aboto; Aboto II, Christ Ang Pry School, Aboto; Motiala/ Igbokuta/ Gedege, Open Space At Igbokuta; Oribero/ Itaage/ Ojatitun, Open Space At Itaage; Ugbagha/ Erehunhun, Open Space At Ugbagha; Orereara I Meth. Pry School Orereara; Orereara Zion, Open Space At Orereara Zion; Orereara II, Open Space At Moboro
Ilaje	Mahin IV	Igboegunrin I, R. C. M Igboegunrin; Igboegunrin II, R. C. M Sch. Igboegunrin; Igboegunrin III, Ang. School Igboegunrin; Igboegunrin IV, Ang Sch Igboegunrin; Igbolomi, St Benedict Pry. Sch Igbolomi; Imoluwa I, St Johns Ang. School Imoluwa; Itebukunmi I, Ang Sch Itebukunmi; Itebukunmi II, Ang Sch Itebukunmi; Itebukunmi III, Ang Sch Itebukunmi; Itebukunmi IV, Open Space Idara Owuro; Eluju/Tiyo Camp, Open Space At Eluju; Madagbayu, Open Space At Madagbayu; Mahintedo I, Ang Sch Mahintedo; Mahintedo II, Ang Sch Mahintedo; Mahintedo III, Ang Sch Mahintedo; Mahintedo Idigho, O/S At Baales Comp. Idigho; Igbobi, Baptist Pry. School, Igbobi; Agbala Holo, Open Space At Agbala Holo; Atijere I, Baptist Pry. School Atijere; Atijere II, St. Judes Pry Sch Atijere; Atijere III (Basa), Open Space At Basa Beach; Atijere IV (Kajola Ajegunle), Open Space At Kajola Ajegunle; Atijere V, Open Space Near C & S Agbala Atijere; Atijere VI, Open Space At Lugboroko; Ehinosa, Open Space At Araromi Ehinosa
Ilaje	Ugbo I	Erunna Ikorigho, L. A Sch Erunna; Erunna Ero, Open Space At Ero; Abeokun Ipin, Pry Sch Abeokun Ipin; Olotu, Comm Pry Sch Olotu; Olotu Kunwo, Open Space At Olotu Kunwo; Yaye, L. A Sch Yaye; Womitenren, Open Space At Womitenren; Ogboti I, La School, Ogboti; Ogboti II, L. A Sch Ogboti; Lepe, Near M. O Lepes House; Oke-Oluwa Zion, Near Baales House; Idogun Nla/ Ayadi, La School, Idogun; Yara/ Idogun, Open Space At Yara; Ehinmore, Community Primary School, Ehinmore
Ilaje	Ugbo II	Ugbo Zone I, L. A Sch Ode Ugbo; Ugbo Zone II, L. A Sch Ode Ugbo; Ugbo Zone III, Near Olugbos Palace Ode Ugbo; Ugbo Zone IV, Open Space At Ode Ugbo; Ugbonla Market, Near 3I Market St. Ugbonla; Ugbonla South I, C & S Pry. School, Ugbonla; Ugbonla South II, C & S Pry Sch, Ugbonla; Ugbonla Central, Town Hall Ugbonla; Ugbonla North I, C & S Academy Ugbonla; Ugbonla North II, C & S Academy Ugbonla; Idiogba I, St. Pauls Pry. School Idiogba; Idiogba II, Near Akinyemi Ajimudas House; Idiogba III, Near Ebisemijus Comp. Idiogba; Idiogba Oke, Community Grammar School Idiogba; Zion Aluba, Near Chief Zion Alubas Compound; Ayetoro I, Community Pry. School, Ayetoro; Ayetoro II, Community Pry. School, Ayetoro; Ayetoro III, Town Hall, Ayetoro; Ayetoro IV, Town Hall, Ayetoro; Ayetoro V, Health Centre; Alagbon, St. Judes Pry. School, Alagbon; Zion Ilueri, Open Space At Zion Ilueri
Ilaje	Ugbo III	Oroto I, L. A Sch Oroto; Oroto II, L. A Sch Oroto; Ebijimi I, Community Pry. School Ebijimi; Ebijimi II, Comm Pry Sch Ebijimi; Ago Olori Alufa/ Otumara:, Open Space At Olorialufa Beach; Ogunsemore/ Ayetoro Ilowo: Open Space At Ilowo Ayetoro Beach; Harama/ Samagbeyi, F. A. C Pry. School Ilowo; Zion Ilowo/ Tatomore, F. A. C Pry. School Ilowo; Jeje Bamgbose, Near R. A Jejes Compound, Ilepete; Ofedegbe, Near Ambrose Ogunbomis House; Leke, Near Pa Ismael Lekes House; Ibojo, Near Pa Rojugbokans House Ilepete; Aworetan/ Sokiso, Near Pa Aworetans House; Imam Ojo, Near Pa Elijah Imanis House; Imani Sea Side, Near Allen Imanis House
Ilaje	Ugbo IV	Obejedo, Open Space At Obejedo Beach; Obe Adun, Open Space At Ogedengbes Comp; Obenla I, F. A. C Pry Sch Obenla; Obenla II, F. A. C Pry Sch Obenla; Obenla III, Open Space At Ikuesans Comp; Obenla IV, Open Space At Ikuesans Comp; Obe Apata, Open Space At Obe Apata; Obe Magbe, Open Space At Ehinmowos Comp; Obe Ogbaro, Near Chief Odokas House; Obe Enikanselu, L. A Sch Obe Idapo; Kugbanres Qtrs, Open Space At Rawas Comp; Obe Rebiminu I, Open Space At Logos Compound; Obe Rebiminu II, Open Space At Omotoyes Compound; Obe Lomore, Open Space Near Adeseteminikan Compound; Obe Uji, Near Ajirubos House, Uji; Obe Arenewo, Near Cecilia Omosowones Compound; Obe Rewoye, La School Obe Rewoye; Obe Eremiye, Near M. E Eremiyes Compound; Obe Orisabinone, Near Orisabinone Compound; Obe Bowoto, Open Space At Bowoto Beach; Obe Ifenla, Near Jonah Parajoyes Compound
Ilaje	Ugbo V	Ojumole I, F. A. C Ojumole; Ojumole II, F. A. C Ojumole; Ajegunle I, L. A Sch Ajegunle; Ajegunle II, L. A Sch Ajegunle; Ikorigho Zion, Mogohen High Sch Ikorigho; Zion Ikorigho, Near E. Ajimudas House; Ikorigho I, L. A Sch Ikorigho; Ikorigho II, L. A Sch Ikorigho; Ilueri, Open Space At Ilueri; Ikorigho Otumara, Near Obazuayes Compound; Odonla I, F. A. C Pry School Odonla; Odonla II, Open Space At Odonla Medunoye; Jirinwo, Near Ajurojus Compound Jirinwo; Odo Fado I, F. A. C Pry School Odo Fado; Odo Fado II F. A. C Pry School Odo Fado; Zion Iluabo, Open Space At Zion Iluabo
Ilaje	Ugbo VI	Awoye I, L. A Sch Awoye; Awoye II, L. A Sch Awoye; Molutehin I, L. A Sch Molutehin; Molutehin II, L. A Sch Molutehin; Igo, Near Ikuejawas House Igo; Ubalekekere, Open Space At Baales Comp; Ubalenla, L. A Sch Ubalenla; Orieretan, Open Space At Omogbemis Comp; Odun Oyinbo, O/S At Odun Oyinbo; Ogungbeje, Near Adesuyi Ogungbejes Comp.; Beku, Near Obazuayes Comp Beku; Yonrin I, C & S Pry Sch Yonrin; Yonrin II, C & S Pry Sch Yonrin; Ebiwon/ Maki, Community Pry. School, Ebiwon; Ekenla/ Ekekekere, Open Space At Ekenla; Oghoye, Pry School Oghoye; Oghoye, Open Space Near Titilolas Compound
Ileoluji/Okeigbo	Ileoluji I	Ajiferere, Cocoa Industry; Loro, Nepa/Ifebaba; Oke Otunba/Geshinde, Oke Otunba; Omobolade, Omobolade; Odomikan, Odomikan; Odoyeghe, Odoyeghe
Ileoluji/Okeigbo	Ileoluji II	Okealaafia/Gbonjingin, St James Pry Sch; Ogbontitun, Ogbontitun; Odolufe, Omokole, Odosikan Ogungboye; Iparuku, Iparuku; Temidire, Temidire; Farm Settlement, Farm Settlement; Odolua, Odulua Omokole
Ileoluji/Okeigbo	Ileoluji III	Ajiferere North, Sky Way Confidence Pry Sch; Odolu, K & S Pry Sch; Odolu, Odolu Youth Foundation; Idioma, Idioma Okeloro; Idioma, Idioma St George Pry Sch; Oke Alafia West, Odole; Oke Aigo, Kajola Road, Ayeye Area; Oke Odunwo, Oke Odunwo; Oke Alafia East, Oke Ita Junction
Ileoluji/Okeigbo	Ileoluji IV	Ehin Ogbe, Mcgee Pry Sch; Oketoko, Oketoko St Lukes Pry Sch; Temidire North, Irewumi Junction; Temidire North, Opposite Post Office; Temidire North, Akintimehin Adejayan; Okeaigbo/Alhaji Odo Junction; Temidire North, Temidire/Olorungbohunmi
Ileoluji/Okeigbo	Ileoluji V	Kajola, Kajola; Araromi Agba, Araromi Agba/Ogburu; Araromi Agba, Araromi Agba/Ogburu Lota Owuro; Balewa, Balewa Area; Ayede Oja, Ayedeoja; Lailepa Onireke, Lailepa Onireke; Oloruntedo, Atarioke; Agba, Agba/Olowosunmoye; Lipepeye, Lipepeye; Olorunsogo, Olorunsogo; Ajebambo, Ajebambo/Losan; Uloen, Uloen/Abatutu/Gate; Uloen, Abatutu/Gate; Ayegun, Ayegun; Ayetoro, Ayetoro; Ojowo, Ojowo; Awo, Okobosin; Akinye, Akinye Oja; Sama, Sama; Ayo, Akingbe Camp; Badeji, Badeji Area; Olabosipo, Olabosipo; Lota Arogbo, Lota Arogbo
Ileoluji/Okeigbo	Ileoluji VI	Adelogbe, Orisunmibare; Araromi, Araromi/Sipi/Ajana; Eyingun, Eyingun/Lumole Komowa/Aba Teacher; Eyingun, Eyingun/Lumole; Moferere Usama, Moferere Usama/Owode/Leyeko; Igbonkuta, Igbonkuta; Kajola, Kajola; Temidire Usama, Temidire Usama; Oluwasola, Oluwasola; Losunla, Losunla; Awo, Awo; Leegun, Leegun; Ologundudu, Ologundudu; Bamikemo, Bamikemo Jegun; Bamikemo, Bamikemo I; Bamikemo, Bamikemo II; Iyere, Iyere; Lipanu, Lipanu
Ileoluji/Okeigbo	Oke-Igbo I	Are Adegbite, Are Sokpo; Pakoyi/Bada, Pakoyi/Bada; Okesa/Odo Yemoja, Okesa/Odo Yemoja; Ayetoro/Osa Ara Okesa/Odo Yemoja, Okesa/Odo Yemoja; Ologbenla Kuole, Ologbenla Kuole; Kuole, Kuole; Oke Agbe, Oke Agbe/Ogunbi; Oke Agbe, Oke Agbe/Idedi; Idedi/St Lukes Pry Schloke Agbe, Oke Agbe/Idedi; Olorunsogo/Oduduwa, Oke Ora St James Pry Sch; Olorunsogo/Maternity, Oke Ora; Oke Bode Idedi, Oke Agbe; Sowo/Ota Orisa Oke Bode Idedi, Oke Agbe
Ileoluji/Okeigbo	Oke-Igbo II	Oke Ojege, Oke Ojege; Surulere, Surulere; Ago Ijebu, Ago Ijebu; Oloruntele, Oloruntele; Paroba, Paroba; Ehinoke, Ehinoke/Ajibike
Ileoluji/Okeigbo	Oke-Igbo III	Idiroko, Idiroko; Abojupa, Abojupa; Kokowu/Balagbe, Kokowu/Balagbe; Idiosan, Idiosan; Kajola Sanni, Kajola Sanni; Arowolo, Arowolo; Araromi, Araromi; Atoototan, Atoototan; Olojo, Olojo; Aratu, Aratu/Olojo; Abagun, Abagun; Adigbolu, Adigbolu
Ileoluji/Okeigbo	Oke-Igbo IV	Bolorunduro, Bolorundoro/Seriki; Irowa, Irowa/Elewere; Olorunkemi, Olorunkemi; Asana, Asana Oriota; Ajejigi, Ajejigi; Arepa, Arepa; Bolorunduro, Bolorunduro; Awopeju/Omilaje, Awopeju/Omilaje; Abapanu, Abapanu; Orisunmibare, Orisunmibare; Oke Alafia, Oke Alafia/Omilope; Aba Amuda, Aba Amuda; Igbo Olodumare, Igbo Olodumare; Ajegunle, Ajegunle; Ramonu, Ayetoro; Erin Owode, Erinowode; Alarere, Alarere
Irele	Ajagba I	Memuren I & II, At Memuren; Gbogbolowo Village At Gbogbolowo Village; Lisa/Jomo/Adero Camp, At Lisa Camp; Gboroye/Odofin At L. A School; Gboroye Village, At Gboroye; Oke Aremo, At Aremo; Ajalere, At Ajalere; Zion Camp/Ojoma, At Ojoma Comp; Jima Village, At Jima Village; Onitorotoro/George, At Onitorotoro; Salawa, At L. A Sch Salawa; Ologunleko Comp, At Ologunleko Camp; Oyewumi, At Oyewumi Camp; Lemigbuwa/Obolo, At Lemigbuwa Comp
Irele	Ajagba II	Baale I & II, At Baales Comp; Baale III/Yasere, At Baales Comp; Baale Logbosere, At Logbosere Comp; Baale Osengbuwa, At Osengbuwa Comp; Baale Akingbolu, At Akingbolu Comp; Ogunmade/Umoro Comp, At Ogunmade; Fayo I & II, At Jowiri Gram Sch; Fayo III, Ebute Ahaba, At Ebute Ahaba; Kwewu Camp, At Kwewu Camp; Ayadi Camp, At Ayadi Camp; Jegunigborowo, At Igborowo Camp; Jegunfayo/Koledoye/Osiko, At St Pauls Sch
Irele	Akotogbo I	Hendoro/Ojumu/Awo At Hendoro Village; Jomo Village, At Jomo Village; Zion Comp, At Zion Comp; Kenumu Village, At Kenumu Village; Larogbo I & II, At Larogbo; Igodan/Asogbo/Odunwo, R. C. M. Pry Sch; Naino Village, At Naino Village; Larogbo/Obolo/Ebute Arogbo, At Methodist School; Yopiara Village, At Yopiara
Irele	Akotogbo II	Juba Village I & II, At Juba Village; Reuben Village, At Reuben Village; Ago Abusoro, At Ago Abusoro; Orhobome Qtrs, Ang Pry School; Ojomo/Ijuosun, R. C. M Sch Ijuosun; Ajijoh Village, At Ajijoh Village; Baale Qtrs I - III At, Baale Qtrs; Erigbenlese Village, At Erigbenlese Village; Naime Village, At Naime Village; Egbijoh Village, Ang Gram Akotogbo; Ogedengbe Qtrs, At Ogedengbe Qtrs; Barogbo Town, L. A Pry Sch Barogbo
Irele	Iyansan/Omi	Segbemi/Iwalere, At Segbemi; Akinboyewa, At Akinboyewa; Akinro, At Akinro; Seja/Yasere Omi, At Seja St, Omi; Halu/Yasere Iyansan, At Yasere Qtrs; Iyansan Estate, At Iyansan Estate; Sokoti Camp, Sokoti Camp; Ubagboro Camp, At Ubagboro; Jegun Qtrs I & II, Jegun Street; Lisa I & II & III, At Lisa Street; Asogbon Camp At Asogbon Camp
Irele	Irele I	Orunbato/Ayebasan/Ademujimi/Lijoka, At Methodist School; Gbeleju Ewuoke, Ewuoke Camp; Lurere Camp, Lurere Camp; Ojowuro/Luwuro/Jegun Lotin, Oloruntedo Hall; Loola Camp, Loola Camp; Gbogi/Ludasa Camp, Gbosi Camp; Gboyegun, Comp High Sch; Lebi/Omonira/Ludasa/Oyenusi/Isowa, Comp High Sch; Petu/Luhare I & II, At Akinboyewas House; Petu Camp, Petu Camp; Ladan Camp At Ladan Camp; Lekon/Okoro Camp, Opposite Baale Lekon; Lamidifa Camp, Lamidifa; Loda Camp, Loda Pry Sch
Irele	Irele II	Aragbuwa Lumeko/Aragbuwa II Makun Comp/Akinseya, C & S Pry School; Lumeko Camp/Ogunsoto, L. A Pry Lumeko; Ebute, St Math Sch Ebute; Aduwo, Aduwo St; Igbo Akinyomi/Monitehin Camp, Igbo Akinyomi; Aduwo Erifunfun, Aduwo Erifunfun; Elewumeji Camp, Elewumeji Camp; Idogun Compound At Ojumu Street; Idogun Arowa Zion, At Arowa Place; Idogun/Wumiakpo, At Lokaka; Idogun/Wumiakpo, At Baale Idogun Camp; Idogun/Wumiakpo, At Idogun Temenu Comp; Idogun Ipinle Lipanu, L. A Pry Sch; Idogun Lipanu, L. A Pry Sch; Idogun Ogunmola, At Ogunmola; Ilutitun, At Ilutitun; Arowa Ogunsola/Okeayo Owobambo, At Ogunsola Camp; Akinseya/Adekugbe Camp At Adekugbe Camp
Irele	Irele III	Legunmare/Ruwahe/Laabale, At Labale Qtrs; Olowomeye/Gboroye, At L. A School; Olowofoyekun I & II, Ang Pry Sch; Ebute Obun I & II, Ebute Obun; Jomowoye V/II/IV, At Oshodi; Legunmare/Ruwahe/Labaale, At Legunmare Strret; Atoranse Temidire, At Atoranse; Omifunfun Labaale, R. C. M School; Owode/Limu, R. C. M Sch Otuloya; Lutako Village, L. A Sch Lutako; Ruwahe Camp, Ang Pry Sch; Otuloya Camp, At Otuloya Camp; Jomowoye II & IV, At Lemikan Street; Ayadi/Oshodi/Ojomo/Medahunsi, At Ojomo Medahunsi
Irele	Irele IV	Ayadi/Irelejare/Lofo, At Irelejare; Osuma Camp, At Legbogbo; Opetusin/Luwoye/Akarigbo At Akarigbo House; Lerunrun Village/Liseri, At Lerunrun Camp; Maran II & III Maran Camp, At Ajigbore Comp; Aro Qtrs, At Ayeyenikans House; Seja, At Seja; Akingboye I, Salv Pry School; Seja Camp, At Chief Loyomuwa; Awo Akingboye, At Awo Camp; Ojan/Adeoye Village At Akinbomi Camp; Maran/Lisa Camp, At Maran Camp; Akingboye II Camp, At Akingboye Camp; Iyara/Otoporu, At Iyara Camp
Irele	Irele V	Gbogunrun I & II At Gbogunruns House; Aribo Qtrs/Konye Qtrs At Konye Comp; Konye Village, At Olowomuwagun Camp; Gbogunrun Village At Gbogunrun Village; Lemadoro/Odunwo/Lurowo/Ogeleyinbo At Olowonoyes Place; Lurowo Village, At Lurowo Village; Omifunfun Village, At Omifunfun; Kidimu/Seja/Temidayo, At Kidimu; Litoto Village, At Litoto Village; Iditala/Yasere, At Iditala; Lota Camp, Lota Camp; Yasere, At Yaseres House; Ganju/Yebo/Arowosola/Ikuejamofo/Ajibola, At Arowosola; Tewogboye, At Tewogboye
Odigbo	Agbabu	Oja Baale Village, Centre Of Oja Baale Village; Agbabu Village, Maternity Centre Agbabu; Lamudifa Village, Centre Of Lamudifa Village; Olowo Village, Centre Of Olowo Village; Olowo Village, Holy Trinity Pry Sch Olowo; Fed Oil Palm/Lamudifa Mulekangbo Village, Fed. Oil Palm Main Office; Comm Pry Sch Kajola Ojurin, Comm Pry Sch Kajola Ojurin; Comm Pry Sch Kajola Ojurin, Comm Pry Sch Kajola Ojurin II; Motor Park Kajola Ojurin, Centre Of Motor Park Kajola Ojurin; Oke Oluwa Zion, Centre Of Oke Oluwa Zion; Lafe Village, Comm Pry Sch Lafe; Likaju Village, Centre Of Likaju Village; Sheba Village, Centre Of Sheba Village; Ajana Village, Centre Of Ajana Village; Ajana I Ajana II, Comm Pry Sch Ajana Village; Otuyegunwa Village, Centre Of Otuyegunwa Village; Araromi Oladapo Village South, Comm Pry Sch Araromi Oladapo; Araromi Oladapo Village North, Centre Of Oladapo
Odigbo	Ago-Alaye	Ago Alaye Village, Comm High Sch Ago Alaye Village; Ago Alaye Village, Market Centre Ago Alaye Village; Sch Area Rubber Estate, Comm High Sch Rubber Estate; Rubber Estate Comp, Ifesojoye/Afamago Village Centre; Oloruntedo Village, Comm Pry Sch Oloruntedo; Good Luck Village, Good Luck Village Centre; Oloruntedo Igo Village & Agrifon Camp, Centre Of Agrifon Camp; Olokuta Village, Comm Pry Sch Owosunmomi; Owosunmomi Olayato Village, Centre Of Owosunmomi Olayato; Owosunmomi Village, Centre Of Owosunmowi Centre; Orisunbare Village, Maternity Centre Orisanunbare; Komowa Village/Dfield Marcel Village, L. A Pry Sch Komowa; Oloruntedo Village, Centre Of Oloruntedo Village; Bolorunduro Village, Centre Of Bolorunduro Village
Odigbo	Ajue	Bolorunduro Aponla Aba Musa Aponla, Centre Of Aba Musa Aponla Village; Orotedo Village, Centre Of Orotedo Village; The Apostolic Village, The Centre Of The Apostolic Village; Oro Village, Centre Of Oro Village; Omifun Oro Village, The Village Centre Omifun Oro; St Mathews Pry Sch, St Mathews Pry Sch, Oro; Omifun Ago Gboro/St Josephs Pry Sch Asewele Korede, St Josephs Pry Sch Asewele Korede; Maternity Centre Asewele Korede, Maternity Centre Asewele Korede; St Marks Pry Sch Asewele Oja, St Marks Pry Sch Asewele Oja; Motorpark, Orotedo Garage, Asewele Oja, Motorpark, Orotedo Garage, Asewele Oja; St Johns Pry Sch Ajue, St Johns Pry Sch Ajue; Court Hall Ajue, Court Hall Ajue; Lasia Village, Centre Of Lasia Village; Dagio/Kinisho Village, Centre Of Dagio Village; Maternity Area Ajue, Maternity Area Ajue; New Town Ajue, New Town Ajue; Oke Igburowo Village, Comm Pry Sch Oke-Igburowo Village; Modebiayo Village, Centre Of Orisunbare Village; Igburowo I & Igburowo II, Comm Pry Sch Igburowo
Odigbo	Araromi Obu	L. A Pry Sch Area Araromi Obu, L. A Pry Sch Area Araromi Obu North; L. A Pry Sch Area Araromi Obu, L. A Pry Sch Area Araromi Obu South; Court Hall Area Araromi Obu, Court Hall Area Araromi Obu North; Court Hall Area Araromi Obu, Court Hall Area Araromi Obu South; Comm Health Centre Araromi Obu, Comm Health Centre Araromi Obu North; Comm Health Centre Araromi Obu, Comm Health Centre Araromi Obu South; Comm High Sch Araroimi Obu, Comm High Sch Araroimi Obu; Maternity Centre I Araromi, Maternity Centre Araromi; Maternity Centre II Araromi, Maternity Centre Araromi; Comm Pry Sch Araromi Obu, Comm Pry Sch Araromi Obu North; Comm Pry Sch Araromi Obu, Comm Pry Sch Araromi Obu South; Adaja Temidire Camp, Cantre Of Adaja Temidire Camp; Enujowo/Agbala James Camp, Centre Of Enujowo Araromi Obu; Agboligi Jagidi Village, Centre Of Agboligi Jagidi Village North; Agboligi Jagidi Village, Centre Of Agboligi Jagidi Village South; Olomi Otoro Camp Likebe Village, Centre Of Likebe Village North; Olomi Otoro Camp Likebe Village, Loghe/Ayetunmara Village Centre
Odigbo	Ayesan	Ayesan High Sch Area/Ayesan Comm Pry Sch Area, Ayesan High Sch Ayesan I; Ayesan High Sch Area/Ayesan Comm Pry Sch Area, Ayesan High Sch Ayesan II; Ayesan High Sch Area/Ayesan Comm Pry Sch Area, Ayesan High Sch Ayesan III; Court Hall Area Ayesan, Court Hall Area Ayesan I; Court Hall Area Ayesan, Court Hall Area Ayesan II; Court Hall Area Ayesan, Court Hall Area Ayesan III; Oil Palm Company, Infront Of Main Office; St Peters Pry Sch, Araromi Obu, St Peters Pry Sch, Araromi Abu; Ayetumara Camp, Comm Pry Sch Ayesan I; Ayetumara Camp, Comm Pry Sch Ayesan II; Ayetumara Camp, Comm Pry Sch Ayesan III; Onimariwo, Fola & Tola Oil Palm, Plantation Centre Of Onimariwo Camp Ayesan
Odigbo	Ebijan	Ebijaw Village, L. A Pry Sch Ebijan Village I; Ebijaw Village, L. A Pry Sch Ebijan Village II; Taibor Village, Centre Of Taibor Village III; Odokoro/Abasule Village, Centre Of Odokoro Village; Comm Pry Sch Obajare, Centre Of Comm Pry Sch Obajare; Obasasa Village, Centre Of Obasasa Village; Ologbosere Village, Centre Of Ologbosere; Ajana Village, Centre Of Ajana Village; Oladapo Orisunbare Village, Centre Of Orisunbare Village North; Oladapo Orisunbare Village, Centre Of Orisunbare Village South; Okunrin & Oladosa Village, Centre Of Oladosa Village; Itamerin Village, Centre Of Itamerin Village North I; Itamerin Village, Centre Of Itamerin Village South II
Odigbo	Koseru	Koseru Area, Infront Of Maternity Koseru; L. A Pry Sch Area Koseru, L. A Pry Sch Area Koseru South; L. A Pry Sch Area Koseru, L. A Pry Sch Area Koseru North; Basola Village, Centre Of Basola Village; Isowa/Aponle Village, Centre Of Isowa Village; Fesojoye Village, Centre Of Fesojoye Ajibodu Village; Ifara-Panu Village, Centre Of Ifara Panu Village; Ifara-Panu Village, Comm Pry. Sch. Ifara Panu Village; Ifara-Panu Village, Centre Of Aba Ifara Panu Village; Moraye Village, Centre Of Moraye Village; Ifarawajoba And Tiamiyu Village, Centre Of Ifarawajoba Village
Odigbo	Odigbo	Laleipa Area, Our Saviour Pry Sch Odigbo South; Laleipa Area, Our Saviour Pry Sch Odigbo North; Town Hall Area Odigbo, Town Hall Odigbo; L. A Pry Sch Odigbo, L. A Pry Sch Odigbo; St Thomas Pry Sch Odigbo, St Thomas Pry Sch Odigbo North; St Thomas Pry Sch Odigbo, St Thomas Pry Sch Odigbo South; Isero Gram Sch Area, Isero Gram Sch Odigbo North; Isero Gram Sch Area, Isero Gram Sch Odigbo South; Ominla Comp Odigbo, Ominla Comp Odigbo; Market Area Odigbo, In Front Of Market, Odigbo; As You Like It Street New Town, Odigbo, Near As You Like It Junction New Town; Odigbo Centre Area, Along Moferere St Odigbo; Lemomu Area Omifon Village, Asarudeen Gram Sch North; Lemomu Area Omifon Village, Asarudeen Gram Sch South; St Andrews Pry Sch, Omifon, St Andrews Pry Sch, Omifon North; St Andrews Pry Sch, Omifon, St Andrews Pry Sch, Omifon South; Ilutitun Village, Centre Of Ilutitun Village; Orita Ojo/Alagbe Village. Comm Pry Sch Orita Ojo; Motor Park Orita Ojo, Motor Park Orita Ojo; Bolorundoro Area Adaja Village, Maternity Centre Adaja; Bolorundoro Area Adaja Village, Oke-Oga Comp Adaja; Market Area Odigbo, St Johns Pry Sch Adaja; Lewure Comp, Adaja; Centre Of Lewure Comp, Adaja; Yarabomo/Owobambo Village, Centre Of Yarabomo Village; Akinfolarin Village, St Peters Sch Akinfolarin South; Akinfolarin Village, St Peters Sch Akinfolarin North; Odole Akinfolarin, Centre Of Odole Akinfolarin Village; Ayetoro/Ago Ose/Fasipe/Ago Ibadan, Centre Of Ago-Ose Village; Temiadara Onidodo Village And Aperin, Centre Of Aperin Village
Odigbo	Oniparaga	St Philips Pry Sch, Oniparaga, St Philips Pry Sch, Oniparaga I; St Philips Pry Sch, Oniparaga, St Philips Pry Sch, Oniparaga II; Dispensary Area Oniparaga, Dispensary Area Oniparaga; Oke-Eka Qtrs, Near Motor Park Oke-Egan Qtrs; Aba Panu Village, Centre Of Aba Panu Village North I; Aba Panu Village, Centre Of Aba Panu Village South II; Ajebamidele Onitea, Centre Of Ajebamidele Onitea Village; Ajebamidele Village Onitea Village, Express Junction Ajebamidele Onitea; Ajebamidele Village, St Lukes Pry Sch, Ajebamidele; Labon Village, Centre Of Labon Village; Obadore Village, Centre Of Obadore Village North; Obadore Village, Centre Of Obadore Village South; Sakoto Village I & II, Centre Of Sakoto Village; Temidire Village I & II, Comm Pry Sch Temidire Village; Comm Pry Sch Obadore Village, Comm Pry Sch Obadore Village; Ayetimbo/Lisagbede Bolorunduro, St Jerome Pry Sch Ayetimbo; Jagiodo Village, Centre Of Jagiodo Village; Ogunlepa Village, Centre Of Ogunlepa Village; Lalepa Ifarafajo Village, Comm Pry Sch Lalepa; St Stephens Pry Sch Kajola, St Stephens Pry Sch Kajola; Dispensary/Maternity Kajola, Dispensary/Maternity Kajola; Ansarudeen Pry Sch Kajola, Ansarudeen Pry Sch Kajola; Near The Post Office Kajola, Post Office Kajola; Omineg Nur Pry Sch Kajola, Omineg Nur Pry Sch Kajola; Raphael Ajebambo Village, St Jeromes Pry Sch Ajebambo; Epemakinde/Milana Village, Centre Of Ilutitun Village; Korede Imorun Village, Centre Of Mokore Village; Karaole Village, Centre Of Karaole Village; Leege Village, Centre Of Leege Village; Onipetesi Village, Centre Of Onipetsi Village
Odigbo	Ore I	St Marks Pry Sch Area Ore, St Marks Pry Sch Ore; St Pauls Pry Sch Area Ore, St Pauls Pry Sch Ore I; St Pauls Pry Sch Area Ore, St Pauls Pry Sch Ore II; Sabo Qtrs Ore, Sabo Old Benin Rd Ore; Sabo Market Area, Sabo Market Ore; Main Market, Along Comm High Sch Ore; Market Area Ore, Opposite Olokuta Motor Park Ore; Market Area Ore, Olokuta Motor Park Ore; Dispensary Area Ore, Dispensary Area Ore; Beulahs Pry Sch Ore (I), Beulahs Pry Sch Ore (I); Beulahs Pry Sch Ore (II), Beulahs Pry Sch Ore (II); Beulahs Pry Sch Area, Beulahs Pry Sch Area Ore I; Beulahs Pry Sch Area, Beulahs Pry Sch Area Ore II; C. A. C Pry Sch Ore, C. A. C Pry Sch Ore; Orisamakinwa St Ore, Centre Of Orisamakinwa St Ore; Fed Min Of Works Ore I, Fed Min Of Works Ore I; Fed Min Of Works Ore II, Fed Min Of Works Ore II; Ogbe Village, Ogbe Village Ogbe; In Front Of Cocoa Store Ore, In Front Of Cocoa Store Ore Idimango I; In Front Of Cocoa Store Ore, In Front Of Cocoa Store Ore Idimango II; Lagos/Ore Expressway Ore, Along Lagos/Ore Expressway Ore; Ayedun St Ore, Centre Of Ayedun Ore I; Ayedun St Ore, Centre Of Ayedun Ore II; Losunla St Ore I, Centre Of Losunla St Ore I; Losunla St Ore II, Centre Of Losunla St Ore; Omiayo/Holy Cross Area, Holy Cross Centre; Lijoka Village, Centre Of Lijoka Village; Costain Village, Army Childrens School Costain; Alagbado Village, Centre Of Alagbado Village
Odigbo	Ore II	Asejire Village, St Mathews Pry Sch Asejire; Bolorunduro Mile 9, Comm Pry Sch Mile 9; Bolorunduro Mile 9 I/2, Centre Of Mile 9 I/2 Village; Bolorunduro Mile I0, St Andrews Pry Sch Mile I0; Onipanu Village, Centre Of Onipanu Village I; Onipanu Village, Centre Of Onipanu Village II; Onirogbo, Centre Of Onirogbo Village; Abatitun Village, Centre Of Abatitun Village; Ajegunle/Agbekoyi Village, Centre Of Ajegunle Village; Ajebamijoko Mile I3, Centre Of Ajebamijoko Village; Olorunsogo Village, Centre Of Olorunsogo Village
Okitipupa	Ayeka/Igbodigo	Oke Igbala, St Raphaels Pry Sch; Ayeka/Ojomo, St Dominic Pry Sch Ayeka; Ayeka/Lumure, 25 Stadium Rd Near Olusolas House; Igboran Camp, Open Space At Igboran Camp; Araromi/Ayeka, Methodist Pry Sch Araromi; Isowa St/Igbodigo, 29 Igbokoda Rd Igbodigo I; Isowa St/Igbodigo, 29 Igbokoda Rd Igbodigo II; Igbodigo Right, Comm Pry Sch Igbodigo Blk A; Igbodigo Left, Comm Pry Sch Igbodigo Blk B; Odunwo St, 32 Igbokoda Rd Near Old Odunwos House; Okunmo I, St Patricks Pry Sch Okunmo; Okunmo, Open Space At Okunmo; Molo Camp, Open Space At Molo Camp; Methodist Sch Area, Methodist Pry Sch Igodan I; Methodist Sch Area, Methodist Pry Sch Igodan II; Owatemi, I7 Brd St Owatemis House; Old Sec Sch, Comm Gramm Sch Igodan
Okitipupa	Erinje	Ayadi Village, Ayadi Village I; Ayadi Village, Ayadi Village II; Obunde/Bamuyegun, Obunde Village; Igbotako I & II, Near Oyeneyins House; Akinlalu St, St Barnabas Pry Sch; Akinlalu St, Akinlalu Street; Odolawe, R. C. M Pry Sch Erinje; Broad Street, Near 64 Broad Street; Broad Street, Near Akinribidos House; Broad Street, R. C. M Pry Sch Erinje; Broad Street, Broad Street; Lijinrin/Falagbo, Near Bishop Falagbos House I; Lijinrin/Falagbo, Near Bishop Falagbos House II; Igbotako/Ilado I & II, Near Chief Obolos House I; Igbotako/Ilado I & II, Near Chief Obolos House II; Okerugbo I Qtrs, Methodist Pry Sch Erinje; Okerugbo I Qtrs, At Okerugbo Qtrs
Okitipupa	Igbotako I	Odojomo Liseri, In Front Of Lajuwomis House; Odojomo/Adeyemi Burial Ground, Open Space At Adeyemi Burial Ground; Loyinmi Camp, Open Space Near Baales House; Open Space Along Apostle Jimbas House; Basemo, St Stephens Pry Sch; Bajowa, Open Space At Bajowas House; Odojomo/Adeyelu, Ilado St Adeyelus Burial Ground; Odojomo/Adeyelu, Open Space At Ilado; Mobolorunduro I, I6 Akinfosile Road; Mobolorunduro, Near Ogunses House; Mobolorunduro, Near Olufisoyes House; Mobolorunduro, L. A Pry Sch Mobolorunduro; Open Space Along Chief E. A Ojajunes House; Wakajaye, L. A Pry Sch Wakajaye; Open Space Along Chief Osowes House; Okeola/Owole, L. A Pry Sch Okefara; Okeola/Owole, Open Space At Omowole Town; Okefara Wakajaye, Open Space At Wakajaye; Wakajaye, Open Space At Wakajaye; Estate Agbetu, Estate Camp Agbetu; Abusoro Camp, Ang Pry Sch Blk I & II; Lopopo Camp, At Lopopo Camp; Ilebe Camp, L. A Pry Sch Ilebe; Baale Juba Ilado Camp, L. A Pry Sch Ilado Mkt
Okitipupa	Igbotako II	Majokolasan St/Idogun, Open Space Near Mosque; Majokolasan St/Idogun, Open Space At Idogun; Ewi Camp Mile 6, Open Space At Chief Fasakins House; Logbosere/Sogbon, Open Space At Obamuwahans House; Logbosere/Sogbon, Open Space At Sogbon; Sogbon Camp, L. A Pry Sch Sogbon; Okedebi, Methodist Pry Sch Sogbon; Okedebi, Open Space At Sogbon Okedebi; Okedebi Camp, Open Space At Okedebi I & II; Akinfosile/Deoye, L. A Pry Sch; Akinfosile/Deoye, Open Space At Adewinle Camp; Open Space Along Chief Aarow Ogunduboyes House, Surulere; Open Space Along Chief Aderibole Emuros House; Open Space Along Chief Faleyes House
Okitipupa	Iju-Odo/Erekiti	Oriola/Surulere, St Mathew Ang Pry Sch Iju0oke; Oriola St, Open Space At Oriola; Egbe Camp, Open Space At Egbe Camp; Gbasun Ibadore/Odogbo, Ang Pry Sch Iju-Odo; Okolisa/Odeluwo, Open Space At Okolisa; Alli/Lumeko, M. M. G. S Iju-Odo; Alli/Lumeko, Open Space At Lumeko; Iganro/Lipere, Open Space At Iganro; Akpobaro Village, Open Space At Akpobaro Village; Gbaragada, Open Space Gbaragada Village; Erekiti Jomo, L. A Pry Sch Erekiti Jomo; Ayeyi/Adeyehun, In Front Of Fanegans House; Ayeyi/Adeyehun, Open Space At Adeyehuns House; Surulere/Likinyo, Ang. Pry. Sch. Erekiti; Surulere/Likinyo, Open Space At Surulere
Okitipupa	Ikoya/Oloto	Obolo East/West, St Joseph R. C. M Ikoya; Igborowo/Okerayo East, Customary Court Hall, Ikoya; Ode Ikoya, L. A Pry Sch Ikoya; Ode Ikoya, L. A Pry Blk II; Obolo Urhobo Camp, Open Space At Obolo Urhobo Irele Camp; Ikoya/Odojomo Ipeta, Near Faws House Ikoya; Beke Beach, 83 Brd St Ikoya; Odojomo East Camp,83 Brd Street Ikoya; Ikoya Estate Camp A, Camp A Division Ikoya; Onagunte/Ipeta, Open Space At Ganhes House; Ipeta, Open Space At Ipeta Dispensary; Onagunte Camp, R. C. M Pry Sch Onagunte; Agbala/Owate Compd, R. C. M Pry Sch Igbisin; Agbala/Owate Compd, R. C. M Pry Sch Igbisin Blk II; Ganle/Mission Rd, Ikale High Sch Oloto; Sewo, Ang Pry Sch Oloto; Igbisin Oke Camp, Open Space At Owofolajus House Igbisin; Olura/Odo Igbisin, Near Market Oloto; Ebuteko, Urhobo/Calabar Camp
Okitipupa	Ilutitun I	Ikuyinminu Qtrs, Near 2, Ijose St Ilutitun; Ajana St, Near Okerisa St Ilutitun; Lijofi St, Ebenezer Pry Sch Ilutitun; Aladeyelu St, Near 42 Rebuja Rd Ilutitun; Egure Oloja, Near Ist Oloja St Ilutitun; Lerun Camp, Open Space At Lerun Camp; Igo Aduwo, Near Old Rd, Ilutitun; Ayebamerun, Near Ayebamerun St; Igo Aduwo/C & S Zion, C & S Pry Sch Ilutitun; Odoka/Igo Aduwo, Near Akindayomi St; Odoka/Igo Aduwo, At Odoka Igo Aduwo; Igo Aduwo/Omoniyi, Near Olotos House Ilutitun; Akinbuwas Comp, In Front Of Chief Akinbuwas House; Igo Aduwo, 99 Bank Rd Ilutitun; Igo Aduwo, Open Space At Igo Aduwo; Igo Aduwo Kobu, Open Space Near Ogunmesins House; Ago Alafia, Open Space At Ago Alafia; Oloruntedo, Open Space At Oloruntedo
Okitipupa	Ilutitun II	Liliken Ogunbamerun, St Peter Ang Sch Ilutitun I; Liliken Ogunbamerun, St Peter Ang Sch Ilutitun II; Iwajaomo, Methodist Pry Sch Ilutitun; Oil Palm Estate, Oil Palm Estate; Adegoju/Akinoye St, I Adegoju St Near Owoenis House; Sedile Qtrs, 8I Brd St Near Babinises House Ilutitun; Adekunle Compd, 66 Bank Rd, Near Dt. Agidis House; Ayetoro I, Comm Pry Sch Blk Ayetoro; Ayetoro II, Comm Pry Sch Ayetoro; Irapetu Qtrs, Near Baptist Church Ilutitun; Irapetu Qtrs, I2 Brd St Near Yaseres House; Iditala Camp, Iditala Camp; Iditala Camp, Open Space At Iditala Camp; Idido Olowosusi, I9 Rebuja Rd Near Henderos House; Ilado Village Urobo, St Pauls Pry Sch Ilado; Ago Idogun, L. A Pry Sch, Ago Idogun; Ira Orunto, Open Spcae At Ademusires House; Iju-Oke Market, Pry Sch Iju-Oke Market
Okitipupa	Ilutitun III	Okerisa St, Okerisa St Near Oyewumis House Ilutitun; Okerisa Camp, L. A Pry Sch Okerisa Ilutitun; Irowa Village, Near Chief Sajos House Ilutitun; Irowa Village, Chief Sajos House Ilutitun; Iju-Odo/Akinlabi, Near Sammaris House Ilutitun; Jegede/Oguntelure, Def C & S Mod Sch Blk Ilutitun; Iju-Oke/Okegbe Camp, L. A Pry Sch Okegbe; Iju-Ode/Ilupeju I & II, Rebuja Rd Near Ajanas House Ilutitun; Iju-Odo/Iwada, L. A Pry Sch Blk; Iju-Odo/Adekanle, Def. C & S Mod Sch Blk I & II Ilutitun; Sogbon/Iju-Oke, L. A Pry Sch II Ilutitun; Surulere, 96 Rebuja Rd Adeguns House Ilutitun; Lipere Lisa, Near Onukuns House Ilutitun; Job, 76 Rebuja Rd, Near Jobs House Ilutitun; Iwada Village, Iwada Village; Sogbon Ogunmola, R. C. M Blk I Ilutitun; Sogbon Ogunmola, R. C. M Blk II Ilutitun; Omotoso I & II, Pry Sch Omotoso I; Omotoso I & II, Pry Sch Omotoso II; Irowa, Near Ijelus House Irowa; Irowa, Catholic Pry Sch Irowa; Ligbesan I & II, Logoloso E. T. C, Open Space At Idiobi Ligoesin; Iju-Oke/Mobolade, Open Spcae At Mobolade
Okitipupa	Ode Aye I	Okerisa/Ayila, 22 Okerisa At Ode-Aye; Okerisa/Ayila, Okerisa At Ode-Aye; Lapoki/Aduwo, Methodist Pry Sch Ode-Aye; Lapoki/Aduwo, Open Space At Aduwo/Ode-Aye; Rail Head, Opp Ghanes House Lada St Aye; Rail Head, Open Space At Rail Head; Odojomo/Oke Eku, St Mathais R. C. M Blk I; Odojomo/Oke Eku, Open Space Odojomo; Okerisa/Adegborioyes, At I, Adegborioye St Ode-Aye; Okerisa/Adegborioyes, Open Space At Okerisa Ode-Aye; Igboluwoye/Gbodofin, L. A Pry Sch Gbodofin; Igorisa/Ladawo, Igorisa Family House Ode-Aye; Igorisa/Ladawo, Open Space At Ladawo; Moboro, At L. A Pry Sch Moboro; Lumeko/Ogoro/Mobi, Methodist Pry Sch Mobi; Batedo, At Batedo Estate; Agbaje/Ogungbemi, Comm Pry Sch Agbaje; Ladawo/Yegbata/Okebola Ogunboye, Baptist Pry Sch Ode-Aye; Ladawo/Yegbata/Okebola Ogunboye, Open Space At Ladawo
Okitipupa	Aye II	Idokin/Idogun/Odofin, 8 Odofin St Odo-Aye; Ikoloma Lumeko, Near Ikoloma Family House Aye I; Ikoloma Lumeko, Near Ikoloma Family House Aye II; Lumeko, Open Space At Lumeko; Uss/Ayadi, Unity Sec Sch Ode Aye; Irokun/Halu, St Xtopher Pry Sch Ode-Aye; Akinreleye, C. A. C Pry Sch Ode Aye; Abusoro/Irokin, St Gregory Pry Sch Ode-Aye; Ojokodo, Ojokodo Family House Aye I; Ojokodo, Ojokodo Family House Aye II; Abusoro, Old Ang Church Ode Aye; Zion, I Zion Compd Ode Aye
Okitipupa	Okitipupa I	Loni St Idepe, 6I Royal Rd Idepe Opupa; Royal Rd Idepe, 43 Royal Rd Idepe Opupa I; Royal Rd Idepe, 43 Royal Rd Idepe Opupa II; Olumekuns Compd, At Olumekun Compd Idepe Opupa I; Olumekuns Compd, At Olumekun Compd Idepe Opupa II; Odunwo Compd, 7 Odunwo St Near Odunwos House Opupa; Akinubi St, Min. Of Information Brd St Opupa; Lebi St, L. A Pry Sch Blk I Opupa; Lebi St, L. A Pry Sch Blk II Opupa; Ilesanmi St, C. A. C Pry Sch Blk I Opupa; Loni St, St Marys R. C. M Sch Blk I Opupa; Ojokodo/Olagbegi, St Pauls Sch Opupa; Okeraye/Aye Rd, Okeraye St Duyiles House; Farm Settlement, L. A Pry Sch Farm Settlement; Apata/Akinsuroju, Baptist Pry Sch Opupa I; Apata/Akinsuroju, Baptist Pry Sch Opupa II; Temenu/Akindule, Temenu Junction Opp Jehofa; Local Govt. Zone, Opp Local Govt Sec Opupa
Okitipupa	Okitipupa II	Abusoro/Ajagbare, Open Space At Ajagbala Idepe; Abusoro/Tech, Govt Tech College Okitipupa; Abusoro/Tech, Open Space At Abusoro; Abusoro/Ajagbala Idepe, St Edward R. C. M Idepe; Jinadu/Doctors Rd, Old Ang Church; Jinadu/Doctors Rd, Open Space At Ogungbadero; Jinadu/Doctors Rd, Open Space At Jinadu Doctors Rd; Ojomo/Kajola, U. N. A Pry Sch Okitipupa; Olayeye Qtrs, At Olayeye Family House; Olayeye Qtrs, Open Space At Olayeye Opupa; Ewi/Ajegunle, St Marys C & S Sch Opupa I; Ewi/Ajegunle, Open Space At Ewi Opupa II; Ewi/Ajegunle, Open Space At Ewi Ajegunle; New Garage Zone, At New Motor Park I; New Garage Zone, At New Motor Park II; Lijofi Compd, Ewi St Okitipupa; Lijofi Compd, Open Space At Lijofi Compd; Araromi Lisa, Ang Pry Sch Araromi Lisa; Igedege, L. A Pry Sch Igedege; Abusoro, Meth Pry Sch Abusoro; Abusoro, Open Space At Abusoro; L. S. A Qtrs, 7 Kuye St Okitipupa
Ondo East	Ateru/Otasan/Igba	Igbodudu/Ateru, St Mathew Pry Sch, Ateru I; Igbodudu/Ateru, St Mathew Pry Sch, Ateru II; Italurowo/Itanala/Nirowi/Igbo-Oja, St Johns Pry Sch Igbo Oja; Igba-Ajegunle, St Edward Pry Sch Igba; Fed Housing, Open Space At Fed Housing; Aye I, II, III/Obun-Ewi/Lugbodi, Pry Sch Obun Ewi; Otasan/Asio/Oke-Ijero, Pry Sch Otasan
Ondo East	Asantan Oja	Asantan Oja/Asantan Village Moferere, St David Pry Sch Asantan, Oja; Asantan Fiibe, L. A Pry Sch Asantan Fiibe; Apata Aje, Open Space At Apata Aje; Orisunmibare/Oke-Oya, L. A Pry Sch, Oke-Oya
Ondo East	Bolorunduro I	Market/Bolorunduro, Ekinmogun High Sch Bolorunduro; Dispensary/Bolorunduro, Odo-Aladura Health Centre Bolorunduro; Baikin/Wasimi/Afun, Pry. Sch. Wasimi I; Baikin/Wasimi/Afun, Pry. Sch. Wasimi II; Obun-Ondo, Open Space At Obun-Ondo; Kajola, Pry. Sch., Kajola; Kotajo/Lope, Open Space At Kotajo; Omiluri/Lijoka, St Philips Pry Sch, Omiluri
Ondo East	Epe	Epe Town, Bishop Ving Epe; Ago-Lisa/Adeyeye, Open Space At Adeyeye; Atamo/Abo-Olorun I, II, III, Comm Pry Sch Atamo; Orisunmibare, Onisosi, Pry. Sch. Onisosi; Ajebambo/Owode/Arinpe Epe Junction, Open Space At Arinpe Junction; Araromi/Owode/Lodosa, St. Barnabas Pry Sch Araromi; Mobire/Ajegunle/Wajaye/Matin, Open Space At Mobire; Laworo, Open Space At Laworo; Lomileju/Okia/Kajola, Pry. Sch. Lomileju; Agiodo I, II, III/Balogun/Ojojo/Wajayo, L. A Pry Sch Wajayo
Ondo East	Fagbo	Awoduyi/Likokojia/Aron/Ominitu/Balogun, St Gerald Pry Sch Awoduyi; Iwori/Betiku/Awaye/Orisanla/Lipetesi, Open Space At Iwori; Lijoka/Akinsoye/Ojolasoro, Open Space At Lijoka; Omifunfun/Opinpin/Soko, St Williams Pry Sch Ominfunfun; Fagbo/Dispensary, St Johns Pry Sch Fagbo; Kooni, Dispensary Fagbo; Oke-Opa, Open Space At Oke-Opa; Fagbo Paadi/Abeere/Fagoayadi, St Michaels Pry. Sch. Fagbo-Paadi
Ondo East	Oboto	Elemoso, Open Space At Elemoso; Ureje/Ranmilowo, Open Space At Ureje; Olorunsefunmi, Comm Pry Sch Olorunsefunmi; Lerutu/Ago-Usobo/Ago-Babaade, Open Space At Lerutu; Oboto, St Lukes Pry Sch, Oboto; Oboto II/Ago-Oba/Ota Pere/Ajetimbo, Gramm Sch Oboto; Laagba/Ayeoba/Ita-Oba/Bomodeoku, Laagba Pry. Sch. Laagba
Ondo East	Orisunmibare	Orisunmibare I, Pry. Sch. Orisunmibare; Orisunmibare II, Gram. Sch. Orisunmibare; Orisunmibare III, Open Space At Orisunmibare; Adeyanju, Health Centre Adeyanju; Lofinika/Cyril Open Space At Lofinika; Lobosipo, Open Space At Lobosipo; Aba Ikirun, Open Space At Aba Ikirun; Olorunsogo, Health Centre Olorunsogo; Sokoto/Ajebambo/Aba Orita/S. Bojo, Comm Pry Sch Sokoto; Ogundele I, Pry Sch Ogundele; Ogundele II, Open Space At Ogundele
Ondo East	Owena Bridge	Owena Elesin, St Mathew Pry Sch, Owena Elesin; Apurere, Health Centre Ago Apurere; Owena Bridge, Comm Gram Sch Owena; Lipepeye/Bello/Gbola/Otokola/Aba/Igbira/Akintewe, St Paul Pry School Lipepeye; Oju Oluwa/Ireti Oluwa/ Kaldejo/Ilu Oyomode/Libansere/ Sasere/Ruwasin At Sasere; Lafiaji/Onipetesi/Akinmotie/Likoja I/Ayadi /Akinwale I, II/Upepeye/Ijakin/Igbo Oluwa At St. Edus Pry
Ondo East	Tepo	Tekunle/St Phillomena, St Phillomena Pry Sch Tekunle; Elikanah, Open Space At Elikanah; Tepo/Boboye/Lekinah/Adeboye, Open Space At Tepo; Ayeferere/Sasere Camp, St Dominic Pry. Sch. Ayeferere; Tepo Gborijaye, Owena Comm Pry Sch Tepo; Tepo New Town/Ayetoro, Open Space New Town
Ondo West	Enuowa/Obalalu	St Peters Cac Sch, Okegbala; Open Space At Olafemiwa/Olaborode I; Open Space At Olafemiwa/Olaborode II; St Marys R. C. M Sch, Jilalu Area; L. A Pry Sch, New Town; Open Space At Omoniyi I; Open Space At Omoniyi II; Open Space At Akinyosoye I; Open Space At Akinyosoye II; Temidire Pry Sch, Iwalere/Olaluwa I; Temidire Pry Sch, Iwalere/Olaluwa II; St James Gramm Sch, Agunbiade Area I; St James Gramm Sch, Agunbiade Area II; Adeyemi College Campus/Arowolo I; Adeyemi College Campus/Arowolo II; Adeyemi College Campus/Arowolo III
Ondo West	Gbaghengha/Gbongbo/Ajagba Alafia	Comm Pry Sch, Obuneko I; Comm Pry Sch, Obuneko II; Pry Sch Okesa I; Pry Sch, Okesa II; Pry Sch Ajebambo I; Pry Sch Ajebambo II; Open Space At Onisoosi I; Open Space At Onisoosi II; Open Space At Aboba; Comm Pry Sch, Adebanjo I; Comm Pry Sch, Adebanjo II; Comm Pry Sch, Oluwabasiri I; Comm Pry Sch, Oluwabasiri II; Open Space At Olojo I; Open Space At Olojo II; Surajadeen, Gbaghengha Oja I; Surajadeen, Gbaghengha Oja II; Pry Sch, Ajegunle I; Pry Sch, Ajegunle II; Temidire Pry Sch; Pry Sch, Gbonkuta; Pry Sch, Losan; Pry Sch, Ayetoro; Pry Sch, Ayetimbo I; Pry Sch, Ayetimbo II; At Motadole/Ilutitun I; At Motadole/Ilutitun II; St. Monicas Sch, Laje I; St. Monicas Sch, Laje II; Open Space At Lijoka; St Lukes Pry Sch, Orisunmibare I; St Lukes Pry Sch, Orisunmibare II
Ondo West	Ifore/Odosida/Loro	St Stephens Gram Sch/Ehinpetu-Idiroko-Oba Area; Open Space At No 33 Loro I; Open Space At No 33 Loro II; Beside Fados Hotel, Oke Alafin I; Beside Fados Hotel, Oke Alafin II; Iya-Oba Bus Stop; Pry Health Centre, Igelemaroko; Beside Rex Cinema At Tewogboye; St Agnes Pry Sch, Odo-Alafia; St Agnes Pry Sch, Lijofi; Opposite Buri Hotel, Oreretu
Ondo West	Ilunla/Bagbe/Odowo I	Comm Pry Sch Osu; Comm Pry Sch, Tokunbo; At Ago Da Gio; At Orita Aponla; L. A Pry Sch, Igbado; L. A. School Kudola; Open Space At Orisunmibare; Open Space At Ilutitun; Comm Pry Sch, Odowo; Bagbe High Sch, Bagbe; St Kevins Sch, Igunshin; Open Space At Ajegunle; L. A Sch Oloruntedo; L. A Pry Sch, Erinla; St Marks Pry Sch, Bagbe
Ondo West	Ilunla/Bagbe/Odowo II	Open Space At Omilosun; Catholic Pry Sch, Lemeso; Open Space At Modebiayo; St Pauls Pry Sch, Ogho; Pry Sch, Olorun Gbadurami; Open Space At Oladapo; Open Space At Fabusiwa; Open Space At Lugbogi; Comm Pry Sch Moferere; Open Space At Tologo; St Bartholomews Pry Sch I; St Bartholomews Pry Sch II; Open Space At Gbelewu; L. A Pry Sch, Oke-Alafia
Ondo West	Litaye/Obunkekere/Igbindo	St Stephen Sch, Oke-Ipa; Comm Pry Sch, Apa-Oluwa; L. A Comm Pry Sch Okegun; L. A Orimolade Comm Pry Sch, Litaye; Christ Ang Pry Sch, Egure-Oba; Open Space At Okeruku; St Mathew Sch, Eleyowo; Comm Pry Sch Ayetoro; Open Space At Loigbo; St Marks Pry Sch, Igbindo; Igbindo Gramm Sch; Open Space At Kajola; Open Space At Igomola; L. A Pry Sch Okegbonawa; L. A Pry Sch Ayetimbo/Pry Sch Legiri; Pry Sch, Owode Elepo; Open Space At Igbindo
Ondo West	Lodasa/Iparuku/Lijoka	St Patricks Pry Sch, Olorunsola I; St Patricks Pry Sch, Olorunsola II; A. U. D Pry Sch, Iyemoja I; A. U. D Pry Sch, Iyemoja II; Open Space Opposite Agip Petrol; Open Space Opposite Agip Petrol, Olorunkole I; Open Space Opposite Agip Petrol, Olorunkole II; Awosika Pry Sch, Edibo; Open Space Opposite Owodunni/Iluyemi Junction; Open Space Beside No 5 Awosika St; In Front Of 22 Arilekolasi St; St Pauls Pry Sch, Olowu Area I; St Pauls Pry Sch, Olowu Area II; St Pauls Pry Sch, Olowu Area III; Holy Trinity Pry Sch, Jimekun I; Holy Trinity Pry Sch, Jimekun II; Open Space At New Nig No. II (A); Open Space At New Nig No. II (B); Open Space Opp Under Mango Tree I; Open Space Opp Under Mango Tree II; Akure Garage, Ogbonjuagbara I; Akure Garage, Ogbonjuagbara II; Open Space Opp Adepetu Petrol Station I; Open Space Opp Adepetu Petrol Station II; At 204 Ademulegun Road, Ajilo I; At 204 Ademulegun Road, Ajilo II; At 204 Ademulegun Road, Ajilo III; Under Coconut Tree, Ajilo I; Under Coconut Tree, Ajilo II; Babalola Memorial Pry Sch, Okinjagunla I; Babalola Memorial Pry Sch, Okinjagunla II; Babalola Memorial Pry Sch, Okinjagunla III; Open Space In Front Of No 87 Under Mechanic Shield, Akinnawowu I; Open Space In Front Of No 87 Under Mechanic Shield, Akinnawowu II; Open Space In Front Of No 87 Under Mechanic Shield, Akinnawowu III; St. Helens Pry Sch, Robert St I; St. Helens Pry Sch, Robert St II
Ondo West	Odojomu/Erinketa/Legiri	Front Of Ojomus Place, Ojojomu I & II; At Loyinmi Junction, Legiri I; At Loyinmi Junction, Legiri II; Open Space Opp All Saints Church I; Open Space Opp All Saints Church II; Salvation Army Sch, Odunwo I; Salvation Army Sch, Odunwo II; Emmanuel Pry Sch, Ayeyemi I; Emmanuel Pry Sch, Ayeyemi II; St Leos Pry Sch, Onakere Area I; St Leos Pry Sch, Onakere Area II; St Leos Pry Sch, Awolope; St Johns Bosco Sch, Okedera I; St Johns Bosco Sch, Okedera II; All Saints Gram Sch, Ora I; All Saints Gram Sch, Ora II; Bethlehem Junction, Bethlehem
Ondo West	Okeagunla Okerowo/Okekuta	Open Space At Market Junction, Oke Ayadi I; Open Space At Market Junction, Oke Ayadi II; Open Space Opp Georges House, Okekuta I; Open Space Opp Georges House, Okekuta II; Open Space In Front Of Fasans House, Ogbontitun I; Open Space In Front Of Fasans House, Ogbontitun II; At No 26 By The Left Near Junction Okesare I; At No 26 By The Left Near Junction Okesare II; Open Space In Front Of Osungboye I; Open Space In Front Of Osungboye II; Open Space At Sokoti Market Junction, Oke-Ayadi I; Open Space At Sokoti Market Junction, Oke-Ayadi II; Open Space At Besdies Carpenters Shops, Sokoti I; Open Space At Besdies Carpenters Shops, Sokoti II; Ogo-Olorun Pry Sch, Moboloda I; Ogo-Olorun Pry Sch, Moboloda II
Ondo West	Oke-Otunba/Oke-Diba/Sokoti	Open Space In Front Of Igbonmoba I; Open Space In Front Of Igbonmoba II; St Marys Pry Sch, Agbala-Maria I; St Marys Pry Sch, Agbala-Maria II; St Marys Pry Sch, Agbala-Maria III; Front Of M. D. S Ododigbo/Okedibo I; Front Of M. D. S. Ododigbo/Okedibo II; Jubilee Gram Sch, Surulere I; Jubilee Gram Sch, Surulere II; Jubilee Gram Sch, Surulere III; C. A. C Pry Sch, Okesegun Area I; C. A. C Pry Sch, Okesegun Area II; C. A. C Pry Sch, Okesegun Area III; Bishop Phillips Pry Sch, Ope-Olowa I; Bishop Phillips Pry Sch, Ope-Olowa II; Bishop Phillips Pry Sch, Ope-Olowa III; Okedasa (Open Space) I; Okedasa (Open Space) II; Barracks Rd, No 33 Open Space; Open Space At Peoples Bank, Okedibo I; Open Space At Peoples Bank, Okedibo II; Opposite Franks Photo, Okeotunba I; Opposite Franks Photo, Okeotunba II
Ondo West	Okelisa Okedoko/Ogbodu	In Front Of Police Post, Fagun/Ife Rd I; In Front Of Police Post, Fagun/Ife Rd II; L. A Pry Sch, Lisaluwa/College Rd I; L. A Pry Sch, Lisaluwa/College Rd II; Our Saviour Pry Sch, Ayoade I; Our Saviour Pry Sch, Ayoade II; St Peters Pry Sch, Ayeferere; A. U. D Pry Sch, Okelisa; St Andrews Pry Sch, Oge; At Man Must Wack, Odotu I; At Man Must Wack, Odotu II; Orimolade Gramm Sch, Ebute Ayo I; Open Space At Ilemoboro/Motilayo Junction I; Open Space At Ilemoboro/Motilayo Junction II; Open Space At Sabo (Sabo II) Sabo Area I; Open Space At Sabo (Sabo II) Sabo Area II; Open Space At Olamojiba (Sabo II) I; Open Space At Olamojiba (Sabo III) I; Open Space At Olufemisoro St, Olufemisoro I; Open Space At Olufemisoro St, Olufemisoro II
Ondo West	Orisunmibare/Araromi	St Philips, Ikonja; L. A Sch, Araromi; St Augustine Sch, Mojolu; St Francis Pry Sch, Lekere; St Pauls A/C Sch, Losan; Open Space At Igbokuta; St Peters Sch, Abusoro I; St Peters Sch, Abusoro II; Open Space At Okelebi, Okelebi; Open Space At Igbose; Open Space At Kajola; Open Space At Orisunmibare
Ose	Afo	Ifinrin/St Davids Pry Sch; Oke-Afo/U. P. E Sch; Oke-Afo/Open Space At Ogunlere; Ugbowoye/Ugbowoye St; Ade Camp/Ohinmale/Open Space At Ohinmale; Ugbe Afo Qtrs I/St James Pry Sch I; Ugbe Afo Qtrs II/St James Pry Sch II; Ugbe Afo Qtrs III/St James Pry Sch III; Ibesan/L. A Pry Sch
Ose	Idoani I	African Church Sch I/ New African Church; Daji Camp/Kajola/Sekere/ At Daji Xcamp; Sekere Camp/ Comm Sch Sekere; Owani Camp/Comp High Sch; Sonel-Bonel/Araromi, At Sonel Bonel Camp; Tax Office/Police Station/New Police Station; Isewa/Court Hall; Otaloro Camp/ At Otaloro Camp; Apostolic Pry Sch/ Apostolic Pry Sch; Akerele/Adesina/Odole By Right/L. A Pry Sch; Holy Trinity I/Near Onidosi St; Holy Trinity II Near Afin Ojomu
Ose	Idoani II	Okepoja/Ilemo Ake/A. C/C. A. C United Left; Okejimo St/New African Church; Okejimo Right/Ogunmola, Isure Hall; Odoro/Methodist Sch, Ofunrun; Igbo-Otake/Methodist Sch, Ofunrun; Uburan Owalasan/Iye Oluwanusi, Amusigbo Hall; Okeliju-Ago-Igara/Okelija Area; Isua/Ipe/Cath Meth Sch; Okikanmi/Omiadun/Okikanmi Area
Ose	Idogun	Ilado St, Near Ilado Uba; Ilemosa, Open Space At Ilemosa; Igbe Uga-Ugbe, Court Hall; Odo-Idofin, St. Pauls Pry Sch; Ejulugbo, Open Space At Ejulugbo; Odo-Owa, Near Odo Owa (Open Space); Iberen/Ilemo/A. U. D Pry Sch Ishara; Iberen/A. U. D Pry Sch Ishara; Oke-Agbe, Ateogun Shara; Ukerekun, Oke-Osua
Ose	Ifon I	Idi-Oro/Ogbonmo, St Barnabas Pry Sch; Ogbonmo, Open Space At Olatoregun; Oruju Rd, L. A Pry Sch; Ikaro Rd From Park, Council Hall Ifon; Igbaja/Erika/Igbadara St, Oladowoles House I; Igbaja/Erika/Igbadara St, Oladowoles House II; Ojutaiye/Owomeyela, Adedijos House; Oja Olorisa/ Olayejo House; Isijola St, Augustines House; Atunwa, Adefegha Junction
Ose	Ifon II	Gbaja St By Left, St Pauls Pry Sch; Gbaja II, At No 2I Irentiwa St; Gbaja By Right, Gbaja By Right; Ilogboko, Baptist Sch; Obanigba/Settlement/Bolorunduro, A. U. D Pry Sch I; Obanigba/Settlement/Bolorunduro, St Michael Pry Sch II; Araromi/Ifon Farm Settlement/Usafon, C. A. C. Pry. Sch., Ifon I; Araromi/Ifon Farm Settlement/Usafon, C. A. C Pry Sch Ifon II; Arenpa Camp, Arenpa Camp; Odogboko Camp/ Odogboko Camp
Ose	Ikaro/Elegbeka	Araromi Qtrs, St. Monicas Cath Sch; Osoro Camp, Near Market Area; Abusoro Camp, Community Pry Sch Abusoro; Owogbon Qtrs, Court Hall; Ebileware, St. Pauls Pry Sch Ikaro; Oroha, St. Pauls Pry Sch Ikaro; Oriohin Camp, St. Peters Pry Sch Ohin; Omi Alafa, Opposite Mosque; Elegbeka Camp, St Andrews Pry Sch Elegbeka; Ago Corner, At Ago Corner; Aba Olufa, At Aba Olufa; Osomalo Camp, At Osomalo Camp; Iju Agborin, At Iju Agborin Camp
Ose	Imeri	Araromi I, Near Police Station; Araromi II, Near Police Station; Araromi III, Near Police Station; Oke Iye I, Near Obas Palace; Oke Iye II, Opposite Obas Palace; Oke Iye III, Open Space At Oke Iye; Uka, Comm Pry Sch Uka; Oke Ose, Near Owayowa Camp
Ose	Imoru/Arimogija	Court Hall/Oturu Left & Right; Court Hall/Oturu Left; Ojumu Street, C & S Pry Sch; Omi-Obi/Akori, Omi Obi Pry Sch; Oliken Qtrs, St. Pauls Pry Sch; Odomoru/Agbakan, St. Marys Pry Sch; New Baale By Right, L. A. Comm Pry Sch; New Church Pry School; Evening Market Area I; Evening Market Area II
Ose	Okeluse	Post Office/Odogbo, Post Office; Odogbo St, At Odogbo St; Court Hall/Dispensary, Court Hall; Ominigbo Camp, Ominigbos Pry Sch; Araromi Street, Ang. Gram. Sch.; Alayo Qtrs, Ang. Gram. Sch.; Ajegunle St, St. Pauls Pry Sch; Ago-Omoba/Amukoko, Open Space At Ajegunle; C. A. C Area, C. A. C Sch; Falodun Camp, Falodun Camp; Wasimi Camp, At Wasimi Camp
Ose	Ute	Akensi/Olokokun/Odomorugbe, Open Space At Akensi St; Otitolaiye Camp, At Otitolaiye Camp; Ariyo Camp, At Ariyo Camp; Owajalaiye Camp I, U. P. E Sch Owajalaiye; Owajalaiye Camp II, U. P. E Sch Owajalaiye; Asolo Camp, At Osolo Camp; Ero Camp, Ero Camp; Abegundes House/Araromi/Bolorunduro, St. Finians Pry Sch; Ijewu Qtrs, Sawmill Rd; Ujewu, Ujewu Qtrs; Ebute/Iboje Camp, Iboje Camp; Irugbe/Kajola/Surulere, A. U. D Pry Sch; Arajomoeye Camp, At Arajomoeye Camp; Senusi/Isama St, St. Stephens Pry Sch; Elerinla Camp, At Elerinla Camp; Omolege/Ugboruwen, At Ugboruwen Camp
Owo	Ehinogbe	Okebola/Badejo/Iloro Rd Junction, Near Ayo Ilebe House Iloro Junction; Oketokun/Okejimala, St. Francis R. C. M Sch.; Olurowo, St. Saviours Sch.; Osula/Bayode/Ibalaaye/Osowe, Opposite Bayodes House; Alh Sanni/Omosere, Near Omoseres House; Akinlelu/Asolo Compound, Methodist Pry. Sch.; Aruwajoye/Ogunmowole I & II, Near Aruwajoye Store; Adebeye/Otekelu, Methodist Pry. Sch.
Owo	Igboroko I	Near Grade C Court, Afin Sasere; Near Elerewes House, Elerewe; Near Oludasas House, Egbewa/Ekungba/Ariyo/Oso I; Near Oludasas House, Egbewa/Ekungba/Ariyo/Oso II; Near Aralas House, Akinlabi/Arala; Near Obabire House, Obabire I; Near Obabire House, Obabire II; Near Osuporu House, Osuporu; Near Ojumus House, Ojumu/Okejimala
Owo	Igboroko II	Near Oronnayas House, Oronoya/Osodi/Oludaye/Okitiasegbe; Near Alh Apaokagis House/Alh Akpaokagi; At Okitiasegbo, Oludaye/Okitiasegbo; St Martins R. C. M Sch, Obaseki Rd I; St Martins R. C. M Sch, Obaseki Rd II; At Owabumaye House, Owabumaye I & II/Okejigbo (A); At Owabumaye House, Owabumaye I & II/Okejigbo (B); Near Alh Aladesukan House, Sajiyan/Ero I; Near Adegbaye Junction, Sajiyan/Ero II; St Martins R. C. M Pry Sch, Osurunnaye I & II Okeigbo I; St Martins R. C. M Pry Sch, Osurunnaye I & II Okeigbo II; At Baptist Pry Sch, Samarogho/Sabokun; C/S Gram Sch, Ariyo/Osoye; Near Sasere House, Osowo/Odo/Agbara/Ijojowa/Sasere I; Near Sasere House, Osowo/Odo/Agban/Ijojowa/Sasere II; Ahmadiya Gramm Sch, Akeredolu; A. U. P Pry Sch, Makun
Owo	Ijebu I	St Peters C. A. C Pry Sch, Obalaja To Ikare Rd; Near Ijanusi House, Obaji/Saboye/Omodo/Osodi I & II (A); Near Ijanusi House, Obaji/Saboye/Omodo/Osodi I & II (B); St Patricks Pry Sch, Uwasokun/Falodun; Rainbow Junction, Bishop House, New Rd; Near Youth Centre, Zok Adetula Sawmill; St Johns Gate/Zok Adetula/Isolo/St Johns Unity Sch; Near Mobil Petrol Station, Mobil Petrol Station Idimopen; Iregun Junction, Iregun; A. U. D Pry Sch, Police Station/Junior Staff Qtrs I; A. U. D Pry Sch, Police Station/Junior Staff Qtrs II; At Clerks Qtrs, Eledunwa/Asewa St; Near Muslim Praying Ground, Olaniyan/Agunloye; Near Alaye Mkt, Alaaye/Okeju Camp I; Near Alaye Mkt, Alaaye/Okeju Camp II; Near Alaye Mkt, Alaaye/Okeju Camp III; Near Alaye Mkt, Alaaye/Okeju Camp IV
Owo	Ijebu II	Near Ade Ologan Store, Olagbegi/Wasimi/Amaka; Near Amakas House, Amaka/Osowe/Oladoyinbo Isokan-Oke I; Near Amakas House, Amaka/Osowe/Oladoyinbo Isokan-Oke II; Near Saliu Ojomos House, Obajuluwa/Okungunre; St Lukes C. A. C Pry Sch, Prisons Qtrs/Ajagbule/Alaaye; Near Fola House, Asolo/Olotu/Irugbe; Near Balogun Adamas House, Odo Agbara To Idasen Boundary; Near Chief Adeola S House, Omolaja To Amusa Yeye; Eminogwa/Obanigba/Ajana/Balogun, L. A Sch Igbanasa; L. A Sch Igbanasa, Eminogwa/Obanigba/Ajana/Balogun; U. P. E Sch Aratokun, Itapele I; U. P. E Sch Aratokun, Itapele II; U. P. E Sch Aratokun, Itapele III; U. P. E Sch Aratokun, Itapele IV; Comm Pry Sch, Itapele I; Comm Pry Sch, Itapele II
Owo	Iloro	St Andrews Pry Sch, Alaja/Ogunmolawa; Near Baderinwas House, Alfa/Adafin I; Near Baderinwas House, Alfa/Adafin II; Near Naibis House, Alajewo/Olotu Okekiri Rd Junction; Near Okekiris House, Okekiri Rd Junction/Adafin I; Near Kayode Ares House, Owoputi/Adafin II; Near Kayode Ares House, Owoputi/Adafin III; The Apostolic Pry Sch, Adanigbo Ezekiel; Near Monday Adenes House, Dedeigbo Rd Junction
Owo	Ipele	A. U. D Pry Sch, Oko Qtrs/Eyo Oke-Gbon I; A. U. D Pry Sch, Oko Qtrs/Eyo Oke-Gbon II; At Okeila St, Oke-Ila/Ogbon/Imola/Egiri I; At Okeila St, Oke-Ila/Ogbon/Imola/Egiri II; St. Pauls Sch, Eyo Okedogbo I; St. Pauls Sch, Eyo Okedogbo II; Near Church Sch, Onatitun/Ijede/Broad St I; Near Church Sch, Onatitun/Ijede/Broad St II; Olubekun Ekelifi, St Stephen Pry I; St Stephen Pry, Olubekun/Okelifi II; St Stephen Pry, Olubekun/Okelifi III; St Stephen Pry, Olubekun/Okelifi IV; St Johns Pry, Olubekun/Atitebi; At Odo Ilana St, Odo-Ilana St I; At Odo Ilana St, Odo-Ilana St II; Near Ofi Church, Ofi Area Ipele; A. U. D Pry Sch, Ago Alao I; A. U. D Pry Sch, Ago Alao II; At Oke-Ogun, Oke-Ogun; St Johns Pry Sch Omolege, Omolege I; St Johns Pry Sch Omolege, Omolege II; St Johns Pry Sch Omolege, Omolege III; A. U. D Pry Sch Ago Miller, Ago Miller I; A. U. D Pry Sch Ago Miller, Ago Miller II; At Aderinola Camp Ifon Rd/Aderinola Camp I; At Aderinola Camp Ifon Rd/Aderinola Camp II; A. U. D Pry Sch Uwese, Ago Aladiya/Uwese I; A. U. D Pry Sch Uwese, Ago Aladiya/Uwese II; At Omosule Camp, Omosule Camp; At Oloko Camp, Oloko Camp I; At Oloko Camp, Oloko Camp II; At Oloko Camp, Oloko Camp III; At Ugbojeu Camp, Ugbojeu Camp I; At Ugbojeu Camp, Ugbojeu Camp II; Near Ajagbale Market, Ajagbale I Baba Egbe; At Ipele Junction, Ipele Junction
Owo	Isaipen	St James Pry Sch, Eminogwa/Sajo/Irowolisagho/Amos Orotu I; St James Pry Sch, Eminogwa/Sajo/Irowolisagho/Amos Orotu II; Near Lolo House, Chief Ale To Lolo I & II; Methodist Pry Sch Fajuyi Rd, Aritedi/Ayeye/Ala/Owajulu; Near Salajas House, Okundalaye/Modongho/Uka Rd Junction; At Obagbuji Street, Obagbuji/Maran I; At Obagbuji Street, Obagbuji/Maran II; Near Famude Bakery, Ogundayomi; Near Unipetrol Station, Hospital Rd; Ade-Olu Pry Sch, Sadibo/Fagboyegun Compd; L. A Ojana, Ojana Grp Of Hamlet I; L. A Ojana, Ojana Grp Of Hamlet II; St Augustus Sch Amehinti, Amehinti Grp Of Hamlet; At Trade Centre, Trade Centre Compd; Near Poly Gate, Polytechnic Area I; Near Poly Gate, Polytechnic Area II; Near Anifowoses House, Igbalaye; A. U. D Gram Sch, Igbira Camp; Methodist High Sch, High Court; Imade College Gate, Ajaka Street I; Imade College Gate, Ajaka Street II
Owo	Isuada/Ipenmen/Idasan/Obasooto	Amuye Gram Sch, Ilale-Ile I; Amuye Gram Sch, Ilale-Ile II; Comm Pry Sch, Idasen, Idasen Layout I; Comm Pry Sch, Idasen, Idasen Layout II; St Michael Pry Sch Idasen, Ilale Keji; At Ajegunma, Ajegunma/Ulema/Amurin I; At Ajegunma, Ajegunma/Ulema/Amurin II; At Ajegunma, Ajegunma/Ulema/Amurin III; St Lukes Pry Sch, Isijogun Village; U. P. E Sch Obasooto, Obasooto/Ugbodi/Aragbaye I; U. P. E Sch Obasooto, Obasooto/Ugbodi/Aragbaye II; Methodist Sch. Ugbeta, Ugbeta Camp I; Methodist Sch. Ugbeta, Ugbeta Camp II; L. A Pry Sch Isuada, Busari/Onisuru/Ojomolade I; L. A Pry Sch Isuada, Busari/Onisuru/Ojomolade II; At Ajase Camp, Asolo/Uwaye/Kajola/Olopopo; Near Asuada Palace, Asuada I; Near Asuada Palace, Asuada II; Near Oderiya Camp, Oderiya/Ugboke Camp; Odererede Qtrs/Agbela; Odererede Qtrs/Agbela I; Odererede Qtrs/Agbela II; U. P. E Sch Aghoro, Aghoro/Orikuta Camp; U. P. E Sch Aghoro, Ago Yeye; U. P. E Sch Aghoro, Ago Panu; U. P. E Sch Sasere Camp, Saja/Sasere Camp; U. P. E. School Aralepo/Adewumi Camp; Ipenmen Gram Sch, Ipenmen Junction; St Stephen Pry Sch Ose, Water Works; U. P. E Sch Oke, Okeju; At Oluoro Camp, Eporo Reserve
Owo	Iyare	A. U. D Pry Sch, Oliyere Olokuntoye; Adeyeri Gram Sch, Okebola Street; Anaye Market, C. A. C/Adesida I; Anaye Market, C. A. C/Adesida II; Near Market Stall, Utelu Camp; Near Catholic Church Alagutan, Kobba Uwese I; Near Catholic Church Alagutan, Kobba Uwese II; Near Catholic Church, Kobba Uwese Alagujun; At Ajiyoko Camp, Ajiyoko; Iyere; Near Ajegunmas House/Ajegunma/Apan/Aroba/Ogundele Compound I; Near Ajegunmas House, Ajegunma/Apan/Aroba/Ogundele Compound II; At Okedogbo Street, Okedogbo Qtrs; Near Baptist Church, Elegba/Ogunbodede; At Upo Village, Upo I; At Upo Village, Upo II; Igbe Village, Igbe I; Igbe Village, Igbe II; Ogunbodede Camp
Owo	Uso/Emure Ile	Oke Uso, St. Andrews Pry. Sch.; St Andrews Pry Sch, Oke Uso I; St Andrews Pry Sch, Oke Uso II; St James Pry Sch, Idemo St; At Iwaro St, Iwaro St; Near Ojos House, Idemo St; At. Imogun Street, Imogun Street I; At. Imogun Street, Imogun Street II; L. A. Sch Oke-Odo, Oke-Odo; Near Oloba Rd, Use. Ise Rd I & II; St. James Pry. Sch Ago Asolo, Asolo/Aruwajoye Compound; Methodist Pry. Sch. Odofin, Odofin Camp I & II (A); Methodist Pry. Sch. Odofin, Odofin Camp I & II (B); St. James Pry Sch Amurin, Amurin Village; At Ago Panu Ago Panu/Ezekiel; At Emure Ile, Emure Ile-Junction I; At Emure Ile, Emure Ile-Junction II; At Maternity One, Odo Oja/Eti Egede I; At Maternity One, Odo Oja/Eti Egede II; At Maternity Two, Odo Oja/Eti Egede III; At Maternity Two, Odo Oja/Eti Egede; Our Saviours Sch Emure, Ilisa St./Olutedo Qtrs I; Our Saviours Sch Emure, Ilisa St./Olutedo Qtrs II; Near Ajegunma Camp, Araromi Camp I; Near Ajegunma Camp, Araromi Camp II; U. P. E Sch Egbodo, Egbodo/Igbadegun Camp I; U. P. E Sch Egbodo, Egbodo/Igbadegun Camp II; U. P. E Sch Eporo, Eporo Village; U. P. E Aiyegunle, Ayegun Camp I; U. P. E Aiyegunle, Ayegun Camp II
