= Olusegun Mimiko =

Nigerian politician and doctor (born 1954)

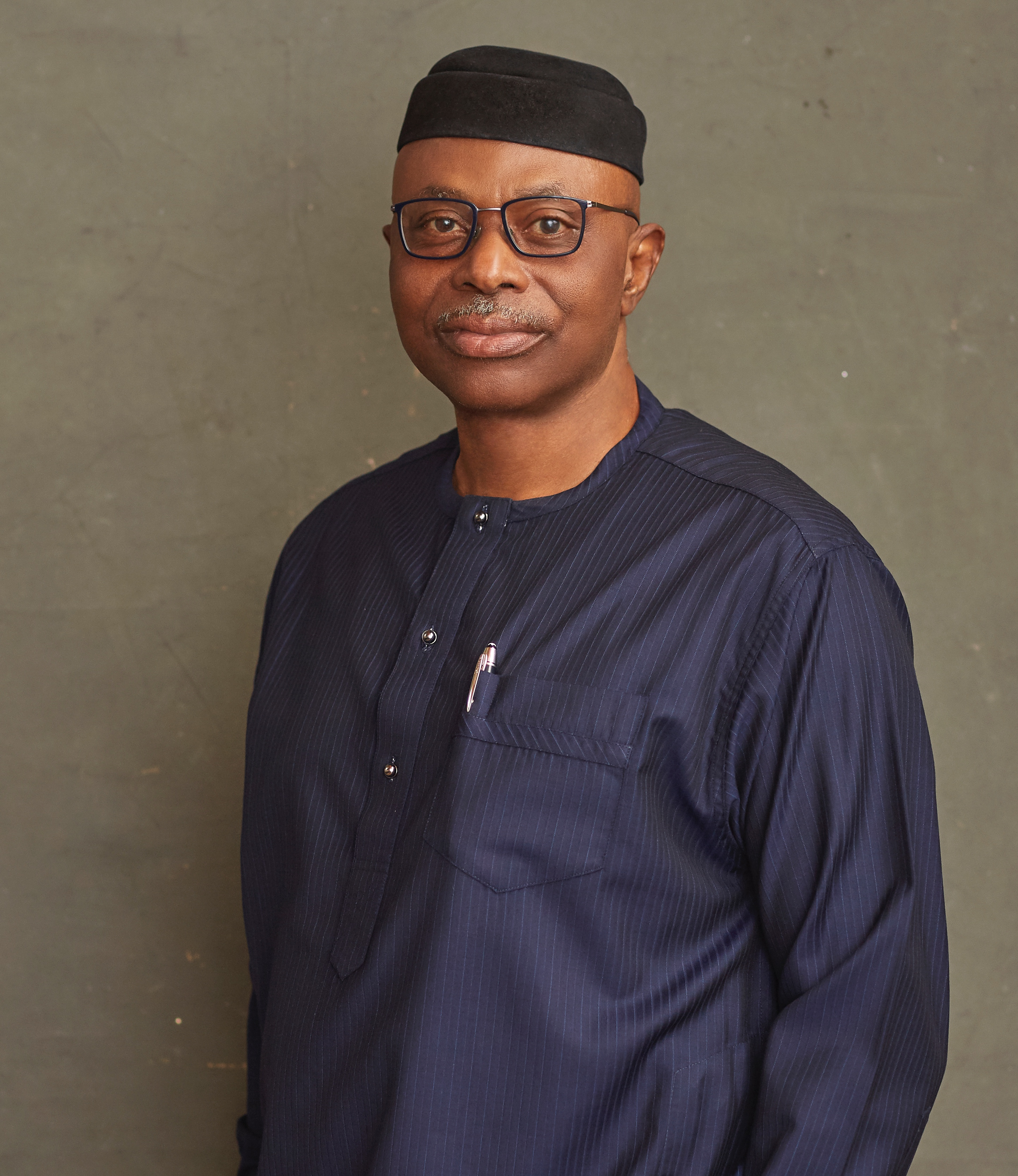
- Mimiko in 2018

Governor of Ondo State
- In office 24 February 2009 – 24 February 2017
- Deputy: Ali Olanusi (2009–2015); Lasisi Oluboyo (2015–2017)
- Preceded by: Olusegun Agagu
- Succeeded by: Oluwarotimi Akeredolu

Minister of Housing and Urban Development
- In office July 2005 – 8 December 2006
- President: Olusegun Obasanjo

Secretary to the Ondo State Government
- In office 2003 – July 2005
- Governor: Olusegun Agagu

Ondo State Commissioner of Health
- In office 1999 – November 2002
- Governor: Adebayo Adefarati
- In office 1992 – November 1993
- Governor: Bamidele Olumilua

Personal details
- Born: Olusegun Rahman Mimiko; 3 October 1954 (age 72) Ondo, Western Region, British Nigeria (now in Ondo State, Nigeria)
- Party: Peoples Democratic Party (2002–2006; 2014–2018; 2020–present)
- Other political affiliations: Social Democratic Party (1992–1993); Alliance for Democracy (1998–2002); Labour Party (2006–2014); Zenith Labour Party (2018–2020)
- Spouse: Olukemi Adeniyi (m. 1990)
- Relations: Olufemi Mimiko (brother)
- Occupation: Politician; Medical doctor

Olusegun Rahman Mimiko (Yoruba: Olúṣẹ́gun Mímikò; born 3 October 1954) is a Nigerian medical doctor and politician who served as governor of Ondo State from 2009 to 2017. He was the senatorial candidate of the Zenith Labour Party for Ondo Central District in the 2019 Senate elections. He served as the 16th (5th civilian) governor of Ondo State, becoming the first two-term governor of Ondo State, and the first Labour Party governor in Nigeria. Mimiko was previously a federal minister for housing and urban development, a secretary to the Ondo State Government, and a two-time Ondo State Commissioner for Health.

Mimiko was born and raised in Ondo Town, Ondo state, South West Nigeria. His political career began at medical school in the University of Ife (now Obafemi Awolowo University), where he was a member of the Students’ Representatives Council (Parliament) and served as the public relations officer of the International Students’ Association of the institution from 1977 to 1978.

After graduating from the university in 1980 and completing his National Youth Service Corps year, Mimiko began practicing medicine. In 1985, he founded MONA MEDICLINIC in Ondo Town which served as a community charity center.

Mimiko's first political appointment was as the commissioner of health and social services in Ondo State from 1992 till 1993 when a military coup terminated the democratic Third Nigerian Republic. On the return to democratic government in Nigeria, Mimiko again served as a commissioner of health in Ondo State from 1999 to 2002 when he resigned.

In 2003, he was appointed secretary to the Ondo State Government (SSG). He held this position till July 2005, when he was appointed as the federal minister of housing and urban development. Mimiko resigned as a minister to contest for the governorship of Ondo against the incumbent, Olusegun Agagu, in the 2007 elections.

He won the keenly contested poll. But, influenced by former president Olusegun Obasanjo, the Independent National Electoral Commission announced Agagu as the winner. Mimiko challenged the outcome of the election in the courts in what turned out to be a two-year legal tussle that climaxed in his being declared the true winner of the governorship poll by a unanimous decision of the Tribunal Court, and the Court of Appeal in 2009. He went on to win re-election in 2012, beating his closest challenger, Olusola Oke of the People's Democratic Party.

After leaving office, Mimiko spent a year delivering public lectures and advocating for universal healthcare and good governance in Nigeria, London, and Washington DC.

In September 2018, he declared his intention to run for president of Nigeria in the 2019 elections. He received the nomination as the presidential candidate of the Zenith Labour Party in October 2018. On 14 November 2018, Mimiko announced that he was suspending his presidential campaign, a few days before the campaign season was formally opened. He took up the Zenith Labour Party's senatorial ticket for Ondo Central district.

== Personal life ==
Rahman Olusegun Mimiko, fondly known as 'Iroko', was born on 3 October 1954, at Ondo Town in Ondo State, Nigeria. His father, Atiku Bamidele Mimiko, was the son of Pa Famimikomi, a son of Chief Ruwase Akinmeji, and a grandson of High Chief Adaja Gbegbaje of the Ondo Kingdom. Mimiko's father was a sawmill manager and a cocoa plantation farmer. He was also a social commentator on national and global developments and a philanthropist. His mother, Muinat Mimiko (née Ogunsulie) was a trader until her retirement. In 1990, Mimiko married Olukemi Adeniyi who studied French language at the Obafemi Awolowo University, Ile Ife. They have four children.

=== Education ===
Mimiko began school at St. Joseph's Primary School Aponmu near Akure, St. Patrick Primary School, Yaba at Ondo in the early 1960s. He attended St. Joseph's College, Ondo from 1966 to 1971. He was a Higher School Certificate (HSC) Student at the Gboluji Grammar School, Ile-Oluji between 1971 and 1972. Mimiko began medical school at the University of Ife in 1972. He was Student Representative Council (parliament) 1975-1976 and chairman of its Special Honours Committee (1976-1977), member of Student's Union Electoral Commission 1976-1977, and public relations officer of International Students Association 1977-1978. He received a B.Sc. Health Science Degree in 1976, and the Bachelor of Medicine, Bachelor of Surgery in 1980. Mimiko is registered with the Medical and Dental Council of Nigeria as a Medical Practitioner.

=== Medical career ===
Mimiko was a House Officer with the Ondo State Health Management Board under which he worked at the General (now State Specialist) Hospital, Ado Ekiti between 1980 and 1981. He then worked at the Nigerian Navy College (NNS Onura), Onne, Port Harcourt (1981-1982) before returning in 1982, to the hospital as a medical officer. He practiced in Lagos as a medical officer at Apagun Clinic, Yaba and acting medical director at Alleluyah Hospital, Oshodi from 1983-1984. In 1985, he set up his own private medical practice MONA MEDI-CLINICS in Ondo City.

== Political career ==
While at university, Mimiko was a member of the Students’ Representatives Council (Parliament), 1975/76, and chairman of its Special Honours Committee. Asides from serving in the Union Legislative House, in 1976/77, he served on the University of Ife Students’ Union Electoral Commission. Between 1977 and 1978, he was the public relations official of the International Students’ Association of the university. Mimiko sought political expression and identity in Obafemi Awolowo's Unity Party of Nigeria (UPN) during the Second Nigerian Republic. Mimiko took up membership of the party after his return from the National Youth Service scheme. In 1983, Mimiko served as the Publicity Secretary of the Ondo local government chapter of the UPN. The Ondo Study Group (OSG) was created in 1987, and headed by Mimiko. In 1988, the OSG General Assembly urged its members to participate fully in politics, with Mimiko leading the initiative. In 1990, Mimiko was supported unsuccessfully by the OSG to run for office as chairman of the former Ondo Local Government now Ondo East and Ondo West Local Government Areas under the new Social Democratic Party (SDP). Later that year, Mimiko was elected twice and served as an ex-officio member of the SDP Executive Council in the Ondo Local Government Council Area. Mimiko was involved in grassroots mobilization and also served as a member of the Party's Disciplinary Committee. Mimiko's OSG played a pivotal role in the organization of Bamidele Olumilua's campaign for the office of the governor of Ondo State.

=== Commissioner for Health, Ondo State (now Ondo & Ekiti States) of Nigeria 1992-1993 ===
In January 1992, under the governor Bamidele Olumilua administration, Olusegun Mimiko was appointed commissioner for health and social services, old Ondo state, which originally included what is now known as Ekiti State. He facilitated the establishment of a Pharmacy Shop System under which 24-hour pharmacy services were being provided in the main hospitals around the State. In response to the incapacity of the government-owned hospitals to handle accidents and other emergency cases, he conceived and facilitated the actualization of what is known as the Accident and Emergency Centres in some of the Ondo State Hospitals. On 17 November 1993, a military Coup d'état led by General Sani Abacha terminated the Third Nigerian Republic and the administration of Governor Olumilua.

=== Commissioner for Health ===
In 1999, Mimiko was prevailed upon by Adebayo Adefarati to shelve his gubernatorial ambition for Adefarati's governorship race. Mimiko later stated that he supported Adefarati on the condition that Adefarati would run for one term. Mimiko was appointed commissioner for health in the state, making it the second time he would hold the office. Within the first 100 days of Adefarati's administration, the Ministry of Health, headed by Mimiko, completed and equipped the Millennium Eye Centre, Akure. The Festivals of Surgery, which provided free surgical operations were carried out to restore the sight of blind and partially blind patients and to relief those with hernias. Mimiko facilitated the delivery of health services to the innermost parts of Ondo State, providing thousands of rural dwellers with their real first contact with the government.

By 2002, Mimiko, dissatisfied with the Adefarati government which had become embroiled in the ‘Plot 90 Gate’ scandal resigned his appointment as State Commissioner for Health. On 7 November 2002 Mimiko formally announced his intention to contest the governorship election on the platform of the Alliance for Democracy (AD). He gave a speech on 19 November 2002, at a Press Conference in Akure, expressing his conviction that for Ondo State, there were “brighter days ahead”, a catchphrase which coined from the name of his group, Brighter Days Network.

Following issues relating to the AD primary elections which he perceived as undemocratic, Mimiko left the party and pulled out his political structure. By 2003, Agagu, the Ondo State gubernatorial candidate of the PDP, having failed to win the governorship election in 1999, needed to forge political alliances with influencers in the State. Mimiko was perceived as crucial to the realisation of Agagu's ambition and an accord was struck with him, which political analysts believe was key to Agagu dislodging Adefarati in the 2003 elections. In April 2003, the erstwhile unpopular PDP won, and Olusegun Agagu became the governor of Ondo State.

=== Secretary to the Ondo State Government ===
Mimiko was appointed the secretary to the Ondo State Government (SSG) in 2003. He held this position until July 2005, when he was appointed by Olusegun Obasanjo as the Federal Minister of Lands, Housing and Urban Development.

Mimiko as SSG represented Agagu for official duties more often than the deputy governor, Otunba Omolade Oluwateru, did. Mimiko was a key player in the formation of the administration's Road Map to Progress, which situated the administration's intended achievements within a specified period of time. The State's initiative to rescue the education sector was Mimiko's brain child. Mimiko stated later that Governor Agagu's decision to run for a second term came as a surprise to him as he had put aside his gubernatorial ambition to support Agagu on the condition that Agagu would serve a term of office and support Mimiko to take over in 2007.

In 2005, after the sack of the Federal Minister of Housing from Ondo State, Alice Mobolaji Osomo, by President Obasanjo, and the disqualification of Governor Agagu's replacement nominee, Ambassador Bayo Yusuf, by the Senate during a screening process, Olusegun Mimiko was nominated by President Obasanjo for the position, and confirmed by the Senate as Minister of Lands, Housing, and Urban Development.

=== Minister for Housing and Urban Development ===
Mimiko coordinated the Obasanjo administration's Reform Programme in the Housing and Urban Development sector, bringing about a shift in policy from direct construction of houses by the government, to increased involvement of the private sector; redevelopment of government landed properties through private sector real estate developers to increase housing stock; and a focus on the mortgage sector in the ongoing re-organization of Nigeria's financial system. Mimiko managed the gradual withdrawal of government from direct provision of residential housing to public servants through the monetization policy; the re-organization and re-capitalization of the Federal Mortgage Bank of Nigeria for more robust operation; and the enhancement of the operations of the National Housing Fund (NHF). The re-positioning of the Federal Housing Authority (FHA); the creation of an enabling environment for sustainable mass production of houses through the National Housing Data Bank, and a framework for housing delivery and urban management through co-operatives, and the Social Housing Programme.

=== The emergence of the Labour party and the 2007 elections ===
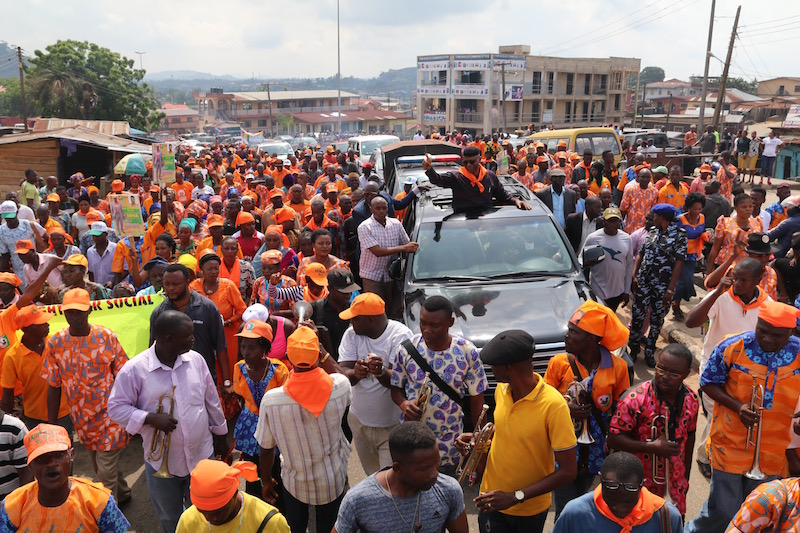
Dr. Olusegun Mimiko, former governor of Ondo State, greets supporters as he drives to the venue of the Labour Party meeting in Ondo Town on 14 June 2018 when he returned to the party

Ahead of the 2007 general elections in April, Mimiko resigned from his position as Federal Minister for housing, lands, and urban development on 8 December 2006, to contest for the office of governor of Ondo State. He also resigned from the People's Democratic Party (PDP). Mimiko recalls that President Olusegun Obasanjo pleaded with him and threatened him not to resign from his cabinet to contest against Governor Agagu. According to Mimiko, Bola Tinubu, the then governor of Lagos State, and perceived leader of the strongest opposition party at the time, Action Congress of Nigeria (ACN), had offered him the ticket to run under the party. “They were the two power brokers (Obasanjo and Tinubu), then. The natural thing to do was to go and hide behind these people. Tinubu would give me the ticket and give me money to run and I would be more immune from Baba’s (Obasanjo's) bullets. I didn’t go to him; I stood on my own.”

With the aid of his political allies, Mimiko formed the Labour Party in Ondo State. Prior to this, it was a relatively obscure party called Party for Social Democrats (PSD), existing only at the national level. Being a completely unknown party in Ondo State, the Labour Party was formally presented by Mimiko to a cross-section of his political supporters at Ondo on 1 December 2006. On 14 December 2006, the Labour Party was launched officially in the southwestern state and Mimiko emerged as the Party's gubernatorial candidate at a rally in the Akure city hall and was formally presented to the people by the Labour Party's national chairman, Dan Nwanyanwu. Mimiko set up the party structure, and candidates amidst financial constraints; The leadership of the Labour Party used existing secondary organisations, whose operations were supportive of Mimiko's aspirations. They also used organisational relics of his previous attempts to run for office, the most visible being the Brighter Days Network (BDN), the Forum for the Reinvigoration of Democracy in Nigeria (FORD Nigeria), and the Ondo Study Group (OSG)

In the lead up to the 2007 elections, media sources reported that President Obasanjo declared the elections a “do-or-die affair” for Nigeria and the ruling PDP. Campaigning in Ondo State on 3 February, Obasanjo stated that Mimiko had defied him by leaving the PDP to contest against Agagu, and threatened that the former housing minister would be paid a visit by the Economic and Financial Crimes Commission (EFCC). Leading up to the elections, the EFCC's autonomy had been perceived to be eroded by the presidency and used as a tool against the President's political enemies. In responding to Obasanjo's claims, Mimiko stated in a press release “With due deference to the person and the office of Mr. President and with every sense of modesty and responsibility, I wish to state emphatically that I am not a corrupt person… During these years of service, not one of my numerous actions and decisions was motivated by any corrupt intentions." EFCC denied the allegation by Obasanjo, stating that it was the President's personal comment. The President's statements against Mimiko were referenced and addressed by the Nigerian Senate on 21 February 2007.

The phrase ‘A Caring Heart’ became the manifesto of the Labour Party's campaign for the elections, after Mimiko's press conference in Akure on 19 February 2007. A CARING HEART is an acronym for 'Health Care and Housing Development; Education, Employment and Empowerment; Agriculture and Integrated Rural Development; Road and Infrastructural Development; and Trade, Tourism and Industrialization'.

On 14 April 2007, the people of Ondo state went to the polls. Local and foreign observers declared the elections the worst in the nation's history, falling ‘far short of basic international and regional standards for democratic elections. Two days after the elections, counting of votes was concluded and Agagu was declared winner of the election by the Independent National Electoral Commission (INEC), under Professor Maurice Iwu.

Mimiko challenged Agagu's victory in the courts. After a legal tussle lasting approximately two years, Mimiko reclaimed his mandate with a judgment delivered in his favour by the Ondo State Election Petition Tribunal, July 2008. The judgment was subsequently confirmed in February 2009, by the Court of Appeal, sitting in Benin, Edo State. His legal team included Chief Wole Olanipekun (SAN), Yusuf Olaolu Ali (SAN), Oluwarotimi Odunayo Akeredolu (SAN), Tayo Oyetibo (SAN), Femi Falana (SAN), and Dr. Olumide Ayeni. The Labour Party was effectively four months and 14 days old by the election of 14 April 2007.

On 28 October 2020, he announced his defection to the People's Democratic Party after meeting with PDP led National Executives.

== Governor ==
After the Court of Appeal decision, Mimiko became the first and only member of the Labour Party to win gubernatorial office in Nigeria before 2023.

Mimiko contested as the Labour Party candidate and won re-election on 20 October 2012, for a second term in office, making him the first governor in Ondo State to win a second term election since 1999. His tenure as governor ended on 24 February 2017. Olusegun Mimiko is the first civilian governor to serve for more than four years since the creation of Ondo state in 1976.

=== Education reforms ===
At the onset of the Mimiko administration in 2009, national statistics put Ondo State as having a school enrolment record that was the lowest in the southwestern region. Mimiko called his educational intervention policy the 5Is formula; Incentive, Inspection, Institutional Management, Infrastructure development and ICT development. On 16 September 2010, the Quality Education Assurance Agency was established as an autonomous institution with the task of discharging supervisory duties in schools. The administration invested heavily in the provision of free education, free shuttle buses, the renovation of over 300 schools including the merging of some primary schools which birthed the Caring Heart Mega primary schools, a major overhaul of the secondary and tertiary institutions, and the creation of University of Medical Sciences, Ondo. Tokunbo Awolowo-Dosunmu, the last child of Obafemi Awolowo, and former Nigerian ambassador to the Netherlands described Mimiko as going a step further of the legacies of Awolowo, particularly in the area of democratising access to education.

Mimiko's Mega school model surpasses the UNESCO standard for a child-friendly school environment and has attracted national and international recognition and criticisms. The 51 schools are across the 3 senatorial districts and have been created in a bid to correct the educational imbalance between the children of the rich and the poor and foster inter-social class relations by making quality primary education accessible to all. Former presidential candidate Tunde Bakare described the Mega school initiative as reminiscent of the late Chief Awolowo's educational development legacy, which fast-tracked the development of the South Western states in the country.

In 2009, the state ranked 33 out of the 36 states in Nigeria in the West African Education Council Examinations (WAEC) The administration embarked on a rigorous structural and curricula upgrade in the state secondary schools, and a free education policy with the state government paying all external examination fees such as National Examination Council (Nigeria) (NECO) and WAEC. By 2016, Ondo state was in 7th position in the West African Examination Council results.

==== Free shuttle buses ====
On 12 June, 2012, widely seen by the Nigerian people as the true Democracy Day in remembrance of Moshood Abiola, Mimiko flagged off the Free School Shuttle buses for all primary and secondary school students. By 2016, 100 free shuttle buses ran throughout the state and 53,000 students in private and state-owned schools across the state had benefited from the scheme. The project was implemented to encourage school attendance and improve punctuality by alleviating the financial burden of education on parents and relieving many students of the realities of trekking long and exhausting distances to school. In Mimiko's words, “The Mega School and free shuttle bus concepts were all targeted at bridging the gap between the children of the rich and the poor so that the poor can have a sense of belonging in the society”.

In 2017, UNICEF scored the state highest in health, child survival, effort on nutrition, sanitation, and education, country representative of the UNICEF, Mr. Mohammed Mallick Fall, noted the free shuttle scheme among other developed social protection policies which the described as "resourceful to the actualisation of SDG Vision 2030."

==== Tertiary level interventions ====
The University of Medical Sciences (Unimed), Ondo was established by a bill signed into law in December 2014 by Olusegun Mimiko. It is the third specialized medical university in Africa, the first in West Africa and Nigeria’s first specialized medical university to be accredited by the National Universities Commission. The university was accredited in April 2015 by the Nigerian Universities Commission.

The Mimiko administration’s reformation of the existing State owned Adekunle Ajasin University (AAU), and the Rufus Giwa Polytechnic, Owo (RUGIPO) was recognized in In 2014 by the United States Transparency International Standards (USTIS) rating Adekunle Ajasin University, as the best state-owned university in Nigeria and Rufus Giwa Polytechnic, Owo, as the best state polytechnic in Nigeria.

=== Kaadi Igbe Ayo (KIA) - The Ondo Residency Card Initiative ===
In December 2010, Mimiko initiated the first Residency Card Project in Nigeria called the Kaadi Igbe Ayo (KIA) Project (Yoruba: The good-living card), stating that the project was primarily designed for efficient service delivery and not just for identification. This was done in fulfillment of his promise in his inaugural speech delivered at the Akure Township Stadium on 24 February 2009, when he told the crowd, “I want to know all of you by name. I want to know where you live. I want to know what you do for a living… I want to be able to talk to you one-on-one. I want to know the exact number seeking employment… I need to know these and many other things to be able to catalyze the joint processes and mechanism for the realization of our collective dream.”

The Kaadi Igbe Ayo is a multi-functional smart card with over 90 applications and captures information about the citizen, ranging from bio data, occupation, family size, income level, and tax records, to health records. Kaadi Igbe Ayo provides access to government services including the Abiye Safe Motherhood programme, free education, micro-credit, and economic empowerment schemes, and highly subsidised agricultural inputs and supplies.

The KIA project has been commended by officials of UNICEF, the United Nations Development Programme (UNDP), the World Bank, the World Health Organization, and the Department for International Development DFID. In 2013, the Ondo State government formally launched and began implementation of the residency card. Some criticism trailed the enforcement of the card for the State's health services, which the state government addressed, stating that the implementation of the residency card had become an imperative response to the influx of non-residents from neighbouring states, induced by the State's subsidized healthcare services and free maternal health programme. The administration received two international and three national awards for the successful implementation of the residency card between 2013 and 2016.

In 2016, Kaadi Igbe Ayo was given the E-Governance Brand of The Year Award by ConsumersNG for being the most proficient multi-application smart card and best e-governance consumer product in Nigeria. As at February 2017, when Mimiko left office, the state government was set to begin the implementation of the card's tax-monitoring feature.

=== Urban renewal ===
In 2012, Mimiko was presented with the UN-Habitat Scroll of Honour Award at the 6th Session of the World Urban Forum held in Naples, Italy in September 2012. Mimiko is the second Nigerian to win the award after Akin Mabogunje in 1998. The award is a human settlements award, mostly won by countries, with only a few wins by individuals and institutions since its inception in 1989. Mimiko's UN-Habitat Scroll of Honour is premised on his bottom-up urban renewal approach to reducing urban poverty throughout Ondo state via his ‘CARING HEART’ urban development agenda. The Mimiko administration's urban renewal projects are recognized as a repudiation of the ‘trickle-down-theory’. They include low-income housing, rebuilding of dilapidated schools, a revival of the comatose agricultural farm settlements, improved intra and inter-city transportation, skill acquisitions for unemployed youths, citywide infrastructure development, and urban aesthetics.

The transformation of the state capital Akure from “developing rural community” to urban city status is arguably one of the most renowned of Mimiko's urban renewal achievements, and one for which he has been conferred with an honorary fellowship award by the Nigerian Institute of Town Planners (NIPT). At a news conference in 2009, Mimiko's presentation of a masterplan to tackle traffic flow obstruction and expand roads was met with scepticism. He announced plans to outlaw the prevalent roadside sale of vehicles, remove hundreds of street traders and artisans from the main roads, and reconstruct strategic roads including the notoriously congested 35 year old Oba Adesida road, and the revered Arakale road, which had been ignored by previous administrations for fear of relocating the sacred shrines. The project was predicted to consume the Mimiko administration and his chances of a second term.

Within the first year of the Mimiko administration, 500 buildings were demolished including makeshift workshops and scores of streets traders relocated from the main roads to facilities labelled ‘Caring Heart Neighbourhood Markets’. Mimiko's neighbourhood markets are replicated in other major towns including Okitipupa, Ondo City, Ikare, and Owo. Within the same period, the governor conflated several dilapidated primary schools, which were nightly criminal hideouts, into single modern structures tagged ‘Caring Heart Mega Schools’. A N350million modern Auto Mart, a Mechanic Village, and a modern public transport hub called the Caring Heart Motor Park, was constructed by the Mimiko administration to relocate the roadside auto-dealers, mechanics, and road transporters. Although the relocation phase was initially met with resistance, the project became a success. The Auto Mart dubbed ‘Cotonou of Ondo’ is the nucleus of vehicle sales in Ondo State, and attracts buyers from neighbouring states.

The Mimiko administration expanded, beautified, and electrified the Oba Adesida and Arakale roads among others, compensating affected persons to the tune of N1billion The Dome and International Conference Centre in Akure, popularly called ‘The Dome’, is a 7000 capacity event center which sits on a 36.05-hectare of land. It was initiated and completed by the Mimiko administration in 2010 and 2015 respectively. It contains the Glass Hall Event Centre designed and built of combined steel and glass materials by Messrs Groupo Systems of Spain and the three in one Dome Conference Centre. Each dome is linked by tunnels and can hold different events simultaneously with the capacity for interface. It has been described as “an engineering and architectural masterpiece” by the Nigerian Society of Engineers. The center is projected to generate an average of N45 million monthly from hall rentals alone. In 2015, the Nigerian Society of Engineers conference of 5000 delegates was held at the centre. The presence of the International Conference center generated a wave of urban renewal activities in the city. On 18 August 2014, Mimiko, under a Public Private Partnership, inaugurated the construction of the state's first ever shopping mall. The N1.651bn structure and car park is located within the state-owned Owena Motels. The Akure shopping mall which houses Shoprite and Filmhouse Cinemas (West Africa) opened in 2015.

=== Agriculture ===
In 2009 the Mimiko administration established the Ondo State Wealth Creation Agency (WECA) in response to the quest for economic diversification and the creation of employment in areas relating to Agriculture & Food Security. WECA functions to drive industrialization and employment opportunities through platforms and implements policies designed for wealth creation including the aggressive promotion of small scale enterprises and indigenous products and services, and the establishment and management of Ondo State agro allied industries. On 19 May 2014, the administration launched the Profarmers & Agropreneurs Sustainable Scheme PASS. Under the scheme, young graduates are assigned to the state's Agro Business Cities and other units under WECA for training and practical knowledge. In 2016 the Youth development programs of the agency earned the commendation of the African Development Bank. WECA re-modelled the farm settlement concept, introduced by Pa Awolowo under the old Western Region, and established four modern farm settlements called Agro Business Cities (ABCs) in three senatorial districts of the state. Agricultural practices being carried out in the Agro business cities include poultry, fishery, cattle rearing, arable farming, sericulture, and apiculture. In 2016, the facilities and infrastructure at the business cities were commended by officials of the African Development Bank.

The Mimiko administration established the Cocoa Revolution Project (CRP), a pilot land restoration program to aid farmers in the development of skills needed to produce premium cocoa beans. The project began with the rehabilitation of the 1,744 hectares Oda Cocoa Plantation in the Akure South area and the Cocoa Catalytic Industry, Idanre. Ondo State signed a memorandum of understanding with a United States concern, SPAGnVOLA Chocolatie LLC, on the establishment of a chocolate production facility and a Cocoa training Academy. The collaboration includes the introduction of fair-trade practices and quality controls available in other cocoa producing countries. In 2014, CRP produced 4.7 metric tonnes of premium cocoa beans and partnered with the Federal Ministry of Agriculture and Rural Development and several organizations like the IITA, IFAD, USAID, French Association for the International Development of Exchange of Food and Agricultural Produce and Techniques, ADEPTA, and Israeli Fertilizer Production Groups.

SPAGnVOLA created the first Nigerian chocolate bar using the CRP Oda premium cocoa beans.

In June 2015, the bar won a Chocolate Silver award from the Academy of Chocolate Award, held in London.

=== Judiciary reforms ===
On 2 September 2011, Mimiko presented a review of the state laws in use since 1978. The Revised Edition of the laws is published in 500 volumes; it is a compendium of all the laws made in the state from its creation in 1978 to 2006. The revised laws became operational on 20 September 2011. Nigeria's first prison High court was established by Mimiko. The Court-in–Prison programme is a feature of the Ondo Rapid Justice System programme introduced in 2012, to accelerate the dispensation of justice, and decongest the state's prisons. On 2 April 2012, the State High Court in the premises of the head office of the Nigerian Prisons Service NPS, Olokuta Medium Security Prison, Akure commenced operation.

Under the Mimiko administration the State Customary Court of Appeal, eighteen new Magistrate Courts, and two High Courts in Idanre and Ifedore Local Government areas were established. The administration carried out a renovation of all the High Courts and Magistrate courts in the State, and attracted the Federal High Court and the National Industrial Court to Ondo State. Mimiko was instrumental in bringing the Akure Division of the Court of Appeal to Ondo State. On 14 November 2015, the Ondo State House of Assembly passed into Law the Bill for Administration of Criminal Justice 2015, to address the issue of delays in the administration of justice.
