= Abiye (Safe Motherhood) Project =

The Abiye (Yoruba:Safe Motherhood) Programme is a home-grown comprehensive health initiative formulated to tackle the challenges of maternal mortality and morbidity in Ondo State, Nigeria. It was initiated in 2009 by the Mimiko administration in response to the 2008 Nigeria Demographic Health Survey (NDHS) which put Ondo State as having the worst maternal and child health indices in the southwest of Nigeria. The Abiye programme was also intended to achieve the Millennium Development Goals 4 and 5 by 2015. It is a free health program for pregnant women, and young children up to age 5. The Abiye initiative aims at ensuring that maternal health care service delivery in Ondo state is accessible and efficient enough to effect a reduction in the rate of maternal and infant mortality The Abiye model has been recognized by the World Bank as a viable template for achieving the targets of the Millennium Development Goals on maternal health within the African continent Ondo State is the only state in Nigeria that met the MDG indicators of reducing maternal death in the country, surpassing the goal with a 75 percent reduction. By 2016, the Ondo State Government had reduced MMR by 84.9 per cent; from 745 per 100,000 live births in 2009 to 112 per 100,000 live births in 2016 through the Abiye Initiative. The programme is funded by the Ondo State government.

== Background ==
The 2008 Nigeria Demographic Health Survey NDHS put Ondo State as having the worst maternal and child health indices in the southwest of Nigeria, with its Maternal Mortality Ratio MMR far above the national average of 545 per 100,000 live births. With the 10th highest Maternal Mortality Ratio MMR in the world and without an efficient and effective national health system, attaining the Millennium Development Goals was a tremendous challenge for Nigeria In 2009, at the inception of his administration, a research study commission set up by Governor Mimiko in order to discover feasible solutions to maternal health, the realization of the MDG goals, and the health system of the State, resulted in the formulation of the Abiye (safe motherhood) Initiative The Abiye Initiative, home-grown health policy was launched in 2009. The initiative was piloted in Ifedore Local Government of Ondo state on 28 October 2009. The programme was scaled up to cover the entire 18 Local Government Areas of the State after the first year.

== Structure and operations ==
The Abiye Programme caters to pregnant mothers and young children up to age five. It is tripartite in structure, flowing from the Abiye basic maternity health centers health to regular hospitals and culminating at the Mother and Child Hospital (MCH). They are all linked via specially trained community health extension workers known as the Health Rangers, communication tools- majorly mobile phones, and a variety of transportation means. The model is a comprehensive policy formulated to address four critical delays that contribute to maternal mortality and morbidity, namely:

-The delay in deciding to seek care (primary phase): Twenty-five pregnant women are assigned to one health ranger who serves as an intermediary between them and the Abiye maternity health centres, and who visits and monitors them regularly. To ensure contact with the health rangers and health care providers, each woman is provided with a mobile phone upon her registration at primary health care centres for toll free calls to the healthcare personnel or sometimes the Governor himself. The phones are prepaid by the government, linked to a caller-user group, and tracked by trained personnel who monitor the calls.

-The delay in reaching care (secondary phase): To reach pregnant women in the rural areas who have difficulty commuting to the health facilities, health rangers and health facilities are equipped with transportation means that are appropriately suited to the area of operation. These range from motorcycles and low-tech tricycle ambulances (locally manufactured in Ondo State), to four wheeled ambulances

-The delay in receiving appropriate care on arrival (tertiary phase): This is tackled in two parts; through the improvement of health care facilities- via the renovation of existing health facilities, the construction of new ones, and the provision of medication and equipment; and through capacity building via the recruitment of health personnel and training of existing health workers, including underutilized community extension workers

-The delay in referral (quaternary phase): This is confronted through the Mother and Child hospitals, which are the apex referral centres under the project. The state has two of these maternal health specialty hospitals with plans for one in each local government area of the state.

== The mother and child hospital model ==
This is the apex referral center in the Abiye scheme. Ondo State has two Mother and Child Hospitals MCH, with plans for the creation of more in the future. The existing Mother and Child Hospitals are located in the cities of Akure and Ondo, they were commissioned in February 2010 and November 2012 respectively. The MCH facilities are state-funded tertiary facilities specialized in maternal health. They are the foremost referral hospitals on maternity in the state, and also receive patients from adjoining states. They offer free consultations, laboratory tests, medication, admissions, and surgeries and have been widely regarded as a maternal health tourism destination for the neighbouring states. The Mimiko administration established the Maternal Death Surveillance and Response (MDSR), and in May 2010, the Confidential Enquiry into law Maternal Deaths in Ondo State (CEMDOS) was signed, mandating the reporting and investigation of circumstances surrounding all maternal deaths, irrespective of the location of occurrence. The Mother and Child Hospital is accredited for post-graduate residency training in Obstetrics and Gynaecology by the National Postgraduate Medical College of Nigeria and the West African College of Surgeons. The MCH has partnered with the London School of Hygiene & Tropical Medicine for conducting clinical trials

== The Agbebiye initiative ==
The Agbebiye (Yoruba: safe birth attendant) initiative was conceived by the Mimiko-led administration in 2014 in response to a 2012 Confidential Enquiries into Maternal Deaths in Ondo State CEMDOS report linking over 90% maternal deaths to the negligence or delayed referrals by traditional birth attendants TBAs or unskilled faith-based persons. Under the Agbebiye programme the Ondo State government partners the traditional birth attendants (TBAs) and faith-based organizations (Mission Homes) wherein the TBAs are incentivized – to refer pregnant women to authorized public facilities and ensure the child is taken delivery of at the facilities – with cash, training in acquisition of alternative vocational skills, and start-up microfinance. Reward is given to the TBAs/FBOs on every delivery of referred pregnant woman in the health facility through a voucher system The Agbebiye project has been replicated or adopted by many African countries and recognized by the World Bank

== Results ==
By the Abiye Project, Ondo State is the only state in Nigeria that met the MDG indicators of reducing maternal death in the country, surpassing the goal with a 75 percent reduction. According to the 2015/2016 preliminary report of the law on Confidential Enquiries into Maternal Deaths in Ondo State CEMDOS, Ondo State witnessed a 70% reduction in maternal mortality rate from a national baseline of 545 per 100,000 women of reproductive age (NDHS 2008) to a verifiable 170 per 100,000. By 2016, the Ondo State Government had reduced MMR by 84.9 per cent; from the state's 745 per 100,000 live births in 2009 to 112 per 100,000 live births in 2016 through the Abiye Initiative Based on the Abiye programme, Ondo State is one of three states (Adamawa and Nassarawa are the others) listed for the Result Based Financing in Health in Nigeria by World Bank

== National and international recognition ==
The Abiye initiative has gained national and international attention from public health experts and institutions. It is recorded in the Nigeria 2015 Millennium Development Goals end-point report as one of the notable national and sub-national success stories of the MDG agenda. In 2014, the UNICEF described the programme as having well recorded and evaluated impacts in reducing maternal mortality, and a good practice to be replicated and adapted in other states and countries The Abiye model was benchmarked by the World Bank as a viable template for achieving the targets of the Millennium Development Goals on maternal health within the African continent and a role model for infant and maternal death reduction in the developing world. The UNDP in a working paper lists it as one of the policy, institutional and programmatic innovations programmes to accelerate progress on maternal health in Africa. A 2013 report from the Center for Strategic and International Studies (CSIS) global health policy center describes the Programme as offering "a glimpse of what is possible with political will, evidence-based planning, simple, available technologies and policies centred on the immediate needs and circumstances of pregnant women". The Abiye Project and its utilization of mobile phones for the reduction of MMR in Ondo State is catalogued in the United Nations Foundation inventory of the use of ICT for health tools

== Financing ==
The Abiye programme is funded by the Ondo State government and grants from outside bodies such as funds accrued through the Results Based Financing partnership with the World Bank.

== Challenges and criticisms ==
In 2015, the Ondo State government was criticized for ordering the enforcement of the state's residence card Kaadi Igbe Ayo to access the state's free maternal health services. The government said the decision was taken in response to the burden imposed on the state through the drastic increase in out-of-state patients. Funding the Abiye project is challenging due to the Nigeria recession. This is tackled by the state government through boosting internally generated revenue from the Mother and Child Hospitals through its post-graduate residence training, research collaborations with institutions like the London School of Hygiene & Tropical Medicine and exploiting federal programmes on maternal health
