= List of tertiary institutions in Ondo State =

Ondo State is one of the 36 States of Nigeria with Akure as the state capital. This list of tertiary institutions in Ondo State includes universities, polytechnics and colleges.

== List ==
- University of Medical Sciences, Ondo
- Achievers University
- Adekunle Ajasin University
- Elizade University
- Federal Polytechnic, Ile-Oluji
- Federal University of Technology, Akure
- Olusegun Agagu University of Science and Technology
- Rufus Giwa Polytechnic
- Wesley University
- Federal College of Agriculture, Akure
- College of health technology, akure
- Sam Maris University
