= Oluyemi Joseph Bajowa =

Retired Nigerian Army General

Major-General Oluyemi Joseph Bajowa OFR
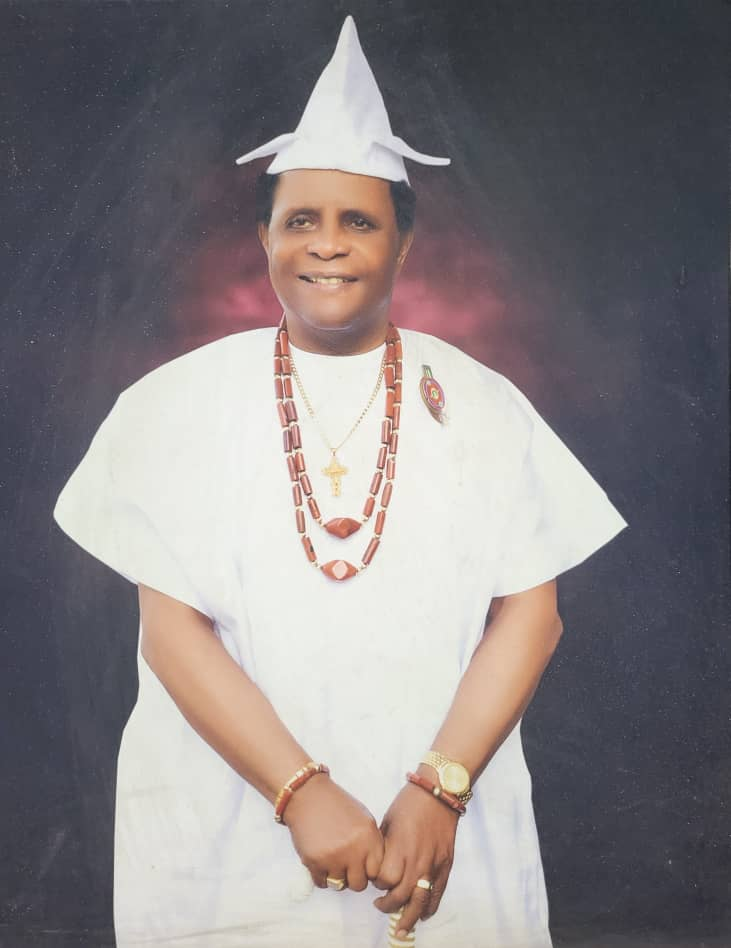
- Born: Oluyemi Joseph Bajowa; 27 December 1940 (age 85); Igbotako, Okitipupa, Ondo State, Nigeria
- Education: Nigeria Defence Academy, National Defence College (India) New Delhi, University of Lagos, Nigeria
- Awards: Nigerian Independence Medal
- Honours: Commander of the Federal Republic (CFR), Order of the Federal Republic (OFR)

Oluyemi Joseph Bajowa CFR OFR (born 27 December 1940) is a retired Nigerian Army Major General, who was Quartermaster General, Nigerian Army, Ministry of Defence (MOD) from 1976 to 1978 and then Commandant, Armed Forces Command and Staff College, Jaji in Nigeria from 1978 to 1979. He was also the Permanent Secretary in the Federal Ministry of Defence (1990–1993); Industry (1993–1997) as well as Science and Technology (1997–1999).

== Early life and education ==
Bajowa was born on December 27, 1940, at Igbotako Osooro in Okitipupa Local Government Area of Ondo State. He attended Manuwa Memorial Grammar School, Iju-Odo, Okitipupa, Gboluji Anglican Grammar School, Ile-Oluji, Ondo (1959) and had his "A" Levels at the Federal School of Science, Lagos in 1960. He later proceeded to the University of Lagos, where he graduated in 1988 with a B.Sc. (Hons) in Business Administration. He was also awarded a Doctor of Theology by the Theological Seminary, Durban, South Africa, in London on 29 October 2005.

== Career ==
Bajowa was enlisted into the Nigerian Army as a cadet in training in September 1960 at the then Military College now Nigerian Defence Academy Kaduna and was commissioned as a 2nd Lieutenant at Mons Officer Cadet School in Aldershot, England in 1961. He was later attached to the British Army in the Rhine, Western Germany during the "Cold War" and thereafter, he was posted to the 4th Infantry Battalion of the Nigerian Army in 1962 to start his military career. He was part of the United Nations peacekeeping force deployed to the Congo in their United Nations Operation in the Congo. He was involved in the Nigerian Civil War, particularly at the "Ore Battle" as a Commanding Officer from 1967 to 1970.

Bajowa retired as a Major General from the Nigerian Army at the age of 40 on 16 April 1980.

Bajowa is also a philanthropist and the owner of AWAWA 94.1 FM. He commissioned the Radio Station in 2020 as part of his 80th birthday celebrations by the now deceased Ondo State Governor, Oluwarotimi Akeredolu.
