= Ondo State Wealth Creation Agency =

Government agency in Ondo State, Nigeria

The Ondo State Wealth Creation Agency (WECA) was established in 2009 by the Mimiko administration to promote economic diversification and the creation of jobs in areas relating to agriculture and food security. It was created from the defunct Accelerated Poverty Alleviation Agency, and was designed to develop policies and programs that foster youth participation in agricultural entrepreneurship in Ondo State. In 2016, the agency's youth development programs earned the commendation of the African Development Bank.

== Partners ==
WECA has partnered with the International Institute of Tropical Agriculture, the United States Agency for International Development MARKET II, the Foundation for Partnership Initiative in the Niger Delta (PIND), West and Central African Council for Agricultural Research and Development CORAF/WECARD, the Federal College of Agriculture (FECA), Federal University of Technology, Akure, the Nigeria Cassava Grower Association (NCGA), FADAMA, the Forum for Agricultural Research in Africa (FARA), United Nations Human Settlements Programme UN-Habitat, Agro Bayu, and SURE-P.

== Departments ==
The WECA programs department is made up of the Livestock Unit, the Arable Cultivation Unit, the Aquaculture and Fisheries Program, which had employed a 100,000 youths in Ondo State by 2014, the Apiculture unit, which is responsible for training of IT students from tertiary institutions on beekeeping and honey production, the Sericulture Section, which produces silk used in the state's production of lawyers' wigs, and the Agro Business Cities Section.

== Functions ==
WECA exercises management supervisory control over the Ondo State Agro Business Cities ABCs. Through the ABCs, WECA facilitates financial aid for agribusinesses from the state government, and trains youths on modern agricultural methods, while exposing the trainees to the entire value chain of agriculture through the initiatives. WECA designs platforms and implements policies for wealth creation through aggressive promotion of small-scale enterprises and indigenous products and services, via four initiatives known as the Profarmers & Agropreneurs Sustainable Scheme through Agro Business Cities (P.A.S.S.THRU ABC's), the Adiye/Eja WECA Promo, the Made in Ondo Brand Promo and the Wealth Creation Fund. WECA functions to drive industrialization and employment opportunities in Ondo State through the establishment and management of agro allied industries.

WECA organizes the Made in Ondo Fair. WECA organized the Youth entrepreneurs with Innovation in Nigeria (YouWin!) business clinic in 2014, and the 9th Western Nigeria International Agribusiness Conference (WESNAGRIC) Summit in 2014 and 2015, respectively.

=== Agro Business Cities (ABC) ===
Under the Mimiko administration, WECA re-modelled the farm settlement concept, introduced by Obafemi Awolowo under the old Western Region, Nigeria, and established four modern farm settlements called Agro Business Cities (ABCs). These settlements include:

- Ore Agro Business City in the Odigbo Local Government area in the South Senatorial District
- Epe Agro Business City in Ondo East Local Government Area in the Central Senatorial District
- Isuada and Auga Agro Business Cities in the Owo and Akoko North East Local Government Areas respectively, in the North Senatorial District. Agricultural practices being carried out in the four Agro business cities include poultry, fishery, cattle rearing, arable farming, sericulture, and apiculture.

The Agro Business Cities are established across the state as training and business incubation centres for Agriculture and Agribusinesses, and are mandated with the task of teaching the trainees, under the Profarmers and Agropreneurs Scheme. The ABCs include modern accommodation, amenities, and recreation facilities for participants. The Agro Business Cities are deliberately created to have an ambience, which youths would find attractive. In 2016, the facilities and infrastructure at the business cities were commended by officials of the African Development Bank.

The Ore Agro Business City was chosen as the model ABC as a result of its strategic location in southwest Nigeria, and the acquisition of a 30-megawatt power plant for the Ore Industrial City, by the administration. The Ore ABC spans over 3,500 hectares of land, and was upgraded to international standards through its partnership with the International Institute of Tropical Agriculture IITA and other institutions in 2014. In 2014, the IITA Youths Agripreneurs IYA program and the Wealth Creation Agency Program collaborated to train youths in Agribuisnesses at the Ore Agribusiness City. The Ore ABC is one of the sites for the Ondo State Oil Palm Revolution. The Auga ABC includes a cattle ranch and goatry, for meat production and processing. Thousands of pro-farmers have been trained at the ABCs by WECA.

=== The Profarmers & Agropreneurs Sustainable Scheme (P.A.S.S) ===
The Profarmers & Agropreneurs Sustainable Scheme (P.A.S.S.) was launched on 19 May 2014 by the Mimiko administration. Under the scheme, young graduates are assigned to the Agro Business Cities and other units under WECA for training and practical knowledge. Between 18 and 24 months, the trainees are taught the business of agriculture through the entire value chain of agricultural finance, supply of input, production, preservation, and processing, packaging, marketing, distribution, and other services, including export. The Ondo State government provides all the agricultural inputs and basic facilities such as land, accommodation, electricity, and training under the scheme. The participant is paid a monthly stipend, in collaboration with the Nigerian Federal Government under the SURE-P Graduate Internship Scheme (GIS). The Profarmers & Agropreneurs Sustainable Scheme is a participation-ownership scheme where the participants develop agro-enterprises wholly funded by WECA. The trainees are entitled to profits from the proceeds of sale of agricultural products they produce during their stay in the agro business cities, while the capital is injected back into the business. The farm produce is bought at competitive market prices by the Ondo State government.
