= Okitipupa =

Local government area in Nigeria

Okitipupa Òde ìdèpé
- LGA and Town
- Nickname: 'Opa'
- Interactive map of Okitipupa
- Location within Nigeria Location within Africa
- Coordinates: 6°33′N 4°43′E
- Country: Nigeria
- State: Ondo State
- Senatorial District: Ondo South
- Federal Constituency: Okitipupa/Irele Federal Constituency

Government
  - Type: Local Government Council and Headquarters
  - Chairperson: Igbekele Joseph Akinrinwa ((APC))
  - Senators: Jimoh Ibrahim; (APC)
  - Representatives: Jimi Odimayo; (APC)

Area
  - Total: 803 km^{2} (310 sq mi)

Population (2016 estimate)
  - Total: 316,100
  - Estimate (2016): 316,100
  - Density: 394/km^{2} (1,020/sq mi)
  - Urban density: 3,936/km^{2} (10,190/sq mi)
- Demonym: Ara Ikale
- Time zone: UTC+1 (WAT)
- National language: Yorùbá
- Climate: Aw

Ikale
Ùkálẹ̀

Total population
- > 750,000 (2016)

Regions with significant populations
- Ondo State - 700,000; Okitipupa Local Government: 316,100; Irele Local Government: 194,600; Odigbo Local Government: 269,880; Ogun Waterside Local government

Religion
- Christianity; Yoruba religion

Related ethnic groups
- Ìlàjẹ, Ondó, Other Yoruba people, Ìtsẹ̀kírì, Àpóì

Religion in Ikale (2017)
religion	percent
Protestant	42.4%
Catholic	36.7%
Anglican	9.6%
No religion	1.5%
Muslim	0.4%
Ìṣẹ̀ṣe	2.6%
Other faith	1.7%

Okitipupa is a town in Ondo State, and the headquarters of the Okitipupa Local Government Area which carries its name. Okitipupa is a part of the Ikale-speaking nation in Ondo State. Major town with a university, Olusegun Agagu University of Science and Technology (OAUSTECH) which commenced academic sessions in 2010–11.

Ìkálè or Old Ìkálè is part of the Yoruba tribe of Ondo state in Nigeria which was originally Ikaleland and combination of the present Okitipupa Local Government Irele Local Government odigbo Local Government and part of Ogun waterside Local Government before the two local governments were split into two namely: Ìrèlè local government and Okitipupa local government Oba of Abodi of IKALE LAND is their paramount ruler.

== Name ==
"Okitipupa" town was historically known as Ode-Idepe and is still called as such by many of the town's native inhabitants. The newer name "Okitipupa" owes its meaning to the relative elevation of the town. Migration of people to the virgin area and the red colour of the soil (Pupa in Ikale/Yoruba). Okitipupa is derived from the Ikale (Yoruba) words; Okiti (hilly) and Pupa (red) which became a name used by people travelling from other communities to trade in the central market of the town of Idepe. Today, the |inhabitants use the names of Okitipupa and Idepe interchangeably.

Okitipupa has always been the central town for the inhabitants of Ondo South senatorial district of Ondo state, comprising; Okitipupa, Irele, Ilaje, Ese Odo, Odigbo and Ile-Oluji/Okeigbo local governments respectively due to the presence of many basic amenities. Okitipupa town is the administrative headquarters of Okitipupa local government with neighbouring communities such as: Ode-Erinje, Ikoya, Ode-Aye, Ayila, Igbotako, Ilutitun, Igbodigo, Iju-Odo, Igbishin-Oloto, Erekiti, Iju-Oke, Omotosho, Akinfosile, Igodan-Lisa, Okunmo, Ayeka, Ode-Idepe and others. It was a district in colonial times before Nigeria's independence in 1960. It has a University, a specialist hospital, several private hospitals, a Magistrate court, a High court, a Nigerian Police Force area command, an Army barrack, Commercial banks, Telephone exchange and numerous Primary and Secondary schools.

Natives of Okitipupa are predominantly employed in agriculture. The major cash crops are Oil-palm, Rubber and Cassava. They also cultivate yams, Beans, Okra, Pepper, Melon and various other Vegetables. Staple foods include but are not limited to; A kind of local Cassava meal popularly known as Pupuru, Yams, Rice, Yam flour and Garri among others.

It has a market that has been a major shopping center for traders from all Yorubaland and beyond since pre-colonial times. A modern market was built by the administration of Herbert Kuewumi in 1979 when he was the executive chairman of the Old Okitipupa Local government before the administration of governor Olusegun Mimiko of Ondo state rebuilt the market in 2009. A large percentage of the roads in the town were constructed by the administration of Olusegun Agagu when he was governor of Ondo state. Major industries located in the town include the Okitipupa Oil Palm Plc and the now defunct Oluwa Glass factory (both of which were listed on the Nigerian Stock Exchange. Oil palm and Rubber litter the landscape.

== History ==
History of Okitipupa and the Ikale Kingdom in the Ikale dialect

In about 1502, there was a development in Benin Kingdom, Oba Esigie was on the throne and since succession to the throne was from father to son, he was worried that he had no male child to ascend the throne after his death. He married many wives so as to produce a male child. The premonition was that some forces were behind his not having male children. One of his wives conceived and went into hiding. He gave birth to a male child in the morning but at that time, many people had gone to their places of work. Automatically, the male child should reign after him. Before he could make an Oba, certain rites were to be performed. They put all the things: crown, sekere, horsetail, beads as a mark of an Oba before the child. Towards evening, when people were returning from their various places of work, another wife of the Oba gave birth to a male child and people were happy, and started jubilating to herald in the new Oba. News now came that a male child had been given birth to the Oba in the morning but kept in secrecy Abodi.

The two male children grew up in the palace. The Oba foresaw problems as to who was to ascend to the throne after him. He advised the elder male child to go across Owena River to establish his own kingdom. Abodi left with some chiefs in Benin and came to the western side of the Owena. He first settled at Arogbo–Ile. While leaving the place, he asked Larogbo to take charge of Arogbo–Ile. He proceeded to Irele and settled there for a while. This first Abodi is called Abodi Jabado. He reigned for a long period before joining his ancestors. His son, called Tufewa, reigned after him. People that were with the Abodi were called Abodi people. The settlement of Abodi in each of the places he settled was called Ikoya. Tufewa went to Ile–Ife to learn the art of governance because he had not learnt the intricacies of palace administration in Benin.

It was also recorded that Esigie sent him to Ooni in Ile–Ife. He was there for three years. At the end of his third year, the Ooni gave Abodi benedictions. He made him to kneel down in a circle marked with white chalk and asked him to carry out these rites in his kingdom/Domain. Abodi came home with this chalk. This led to the use of white chalk (Efun) which is used to make inscriptions or marks on the ground (meaning) Ikale. That is what we bear today. Without prejudice to anybody, some people say we covered the land “a ka ile yi”. While some people claimed that a man was living beside the Owena River named Aale, and so his village was called Aale. From the three schools of thought, we presume that the act of using a white chalk to make an inscription on the ground to mean Ikale is the most acceptable. The Chiefs that accompanied him from Benin and those that joined him later were given districts to administer. These chiefs were called Olojas. They were given recognitions as Obas in 1979. meanwhile, Abodi gave them titles and they were responsible to him. Today, to a large extent they are autonomous in the administration of their areas. There is no time that the Ikales are nine or their rulers were nine. But the idea of Ikale mehan came during the colonial era. The reasons were best known to the colonial masters. Ajagba, Ujosun and Akotogbo were administered by Benin confederation. Two reasons were advanced for carving out the three: (i) They spoke Benin language (ii) They were too distant from Ikoya administration. One needs to say that if the colonial masters had understood the origin of the Ikales, they would not have carved out these three areas and put them under Benin Administration.

Originally, there was; Larogbo of Akotogbo; Oluhogbo of Ujosun, Ahaba of Ajagba, Laragunsin of Iyansan, Odogbo of Omi, Olofun of Irele, Halu/Lapoki of Ode-Aye, Jagun of Idepe, Obagberume of Igbodigo, Lumure of Ayeka, Orungberuwa of Erinje, Olura of Igbinsin Oloto, Rebuja of Osooro, and Onipe of Ubu.

Some of the rulers mentioned above are offsprings of other royal fathers. For example, Jagun is an offspring of Larogbo, Rebuja is an offspring of Lumure. Due to lack of contact, Onipe was lost to Ijebu area. Today, in addition to the aforementioned Obas, we have: Norogun of Ayede, Olu of Igodan, Majuwa of Morubodo Kingdom, and Orofun of Iju – Odo. Ikoya is very important in the history of Ikale development. Abodi Jabado was asked to move out and found his kingdom. Esigie gave Abodi all the paraphernalia of office. Sword (Uda) was left out. Oba Esigie was confused with whom to give; either Oba Abodi or Orogbua. Oba Esigie then called his palace chiefs to consider whom to be given the sword. The palace chiefs made two of them to contest for the "Uda". The sword was thrown up for them to catch. In the process, Abodi gripped the handle while Orogbua held the blade. Orogbua's hand was cut and Abodi won the contest and had the "Uda". Oba Esigie told Abodi to use the sword to ward off attacks, aggressions and insults. In other words, the uda was given to Abodi to ward off enemies (ki o fi ko iya) To confirm this, Abodi is the only Oba that bears the appellation, "Ogun Olugba uda…" Anywhere Abodi settles is called Ikoya. He settled in Atijere, Ode, Lagos, etc. It was Abodi Kugbayigbe who came to found the present Ikoya. Ikoya is a shifting settlement along with its civilization, culture, custom, ethics and norms.

In those days, there was a lot of human sacrifice. Only the relations of Abodi were spared. Strangers were used for these sacrifices. This made them move from Ikoya Kingdom because that time, to stay at Ikoya was between life and death. The Ikales because of their good administration, their neighbours feared them. There were two events when we had clashes. Alake wanted to override Onipe. Onipe called on Abodi and the force of Alake was forced to retreat. It was not directly between Alake and Ikale. It was later that Alake discovered that Abodi assisted Onipe but Abodi had already moved away from there. Ondos and Ikales fought wars though not with the entire Ikale but with some districts like Aye, Irele having boundaries with them. In each of these wars, Ikales always emerged victorious because the entire Ikale fought as a unit.

In one of the wars, the Ondo warriors were decisively rooted which led to the immediate death of the then Osemawe who could not stand the defeat (O si igba). Apart from external wars, Ikales had internal conflicts between Osooro and Idepe and Ayeka. We had no war with the Ilajes, Ijaws, and the Ijebus. The war we had with Larogbo was a very critical one in which Erinje was grossly affected which made them to hide in a place called Aluma. Apart from this, there were no serious wars like Kiriji and others. The present chieftaincy titles practiced in Ikale was brought by Abodi Tufewa when he traveled to Ile – Ife. The first set of Ijama were Ligha, Jomo, Petu, Yasere, Odunwo and Isowa, headed by Lema. They were established in all Ikale areas by the second Abodi. In most Ikale areas today, these six chiefs form the leadership of Ijama. It is not mandatory that you have all of them. In some towns, they are Egharepara. Ijama was banished in 1919 but resuscitated in the 1930s because Ijama is the organ of administration. The hierarchical setup is: Oba – Ijama – Ijoye – Omaja.lkale land covered two local government in ondo state and part of Ogun waterside Local government Ogun state. Okitipupa local government. Irele Local government. Ogun waterside Local government.

== Foundation ==
Ikale is one of the several dialects spoken by the Yoruba of Nigeria. The name also refers to the people who speak the dialect. This subgroup is made up of fourteen communities in the southwestern part of Ondo state of Nigeria. They share boundaries with the Ilaje, Ijo Apoi, and Ijo Arogbo to the south; Edo state to the east and Ogun state to the west. Ikale ccommunties include Ikoya-Ikale, Ode-Irele, Ode-Omi, Igbodigo, Ayeka, Idepe-Okitipupa, Ode-Aye, Erinje, Osooro and Igbinsin-Oloto, Akotogbo, Ajagba, Iyansan and Iju-Osun and also cover many towns and villages in Odigbo local government (Agbabu, Lafelepe, Okeoluwa, Sheba, Mulekangbo, Modebiayo, Lafe-lepa, Egbe, Ago-Lagaba, Ago-Lowo, Ayetedo, Ojabale, Ajebamidele, Ajebambo, koseru, Onipetesi, Imorun, Sokoto, Ayetoro, Basola, Agirifon, Ayetunmbo Ode-Ore. These last four communities were formerly group under the so called Benin confederation by the British administration. Osooro is a conglomeration of Igbotako, Ilutitun, Iju-odo, Iju-oke, Erekiti Luwoye, Ilado, Agbetu and Omotosho townships. The Ikale also have kindred communities in parts of Ogun state, viz; Ayede, Ayila, Arafen and Mobolorundo

While some ikale communities claim direct descent from ife, others claim Benin, or Ugbo Ilaje descent, and a few others elsewhere like Akoko land. Oral tradition confirms that there were migrations from Ife Ooye before the Benin contact of the Sixteenth century, which tend to link Ikale dynasty to Oba Esigie. According to the history, it occurred during the Edi festival, an annual festival in Ile Ife. For seven days, he claimed, the priest would spend mats on the floor on which all necessary rites would be performed. The mats would be removed on the seventh day, making the end of the festival, when the mats are removed, elders would say ‘’a ka ile’’ according to the history that was the day people now known as ikale migrated from Ife. The people never settled in the same spot, when they met each other as they moved about, they exchanged greetings and asked from each other the day they left Ile-ife. In response, they said that they left Ife ‘’ni ojo ikale’’ the day when the mats were removed from the ground. Since then, they have started calling themselves Ikale. According to history it was claimed that Ikale refers to an incident that happened during the second abodi's visit to Ile-ife. Before he left Ife, he knelt down inside a circle of chalk to receive blessings from Ooni of ife. Ikale is said to derive from the drawing of circle with the hand: Ika, on the ground: Ile.

However, the genuineness of these migration theory riddles remains to be determined. What is clear that the culture of the ikale and the edo are relatively similar. Moreover, both Ikale and Ilaje oral traditions emphasize their mutual relationship with Ife in their frequent mention of Ife in their music and in their propitiation.

== Government of Okitipupa ==
The Government of Okitipupa is defined and authorized under the Federal Republic of Nigeria Constitution, Government of Ondo State is in practice of some responsibility of county governments, such as the Government of Okitipupa. The Government of Okitipupa provides countywide services such as elections and voter registration, law enforcement, jails, vital records, property records, tax collection, public health, health care, and social services, clean environment, diversified and sustainable water supply, provide medical services or emergency medical services. In addition the County serves as the local government for all unincorporated areas.

== Geography ==
Ikale occupies a large area along the southwestern part of Ondo state and, sharing land borders with Ilaje Local Government to the south; Edo state to the east Ogun State the west; and Ondo Local Government to the north. It has an area of 803 km^{2} (310 sq mi) and a population of 233,565 as at 2006 census. The postal code of the area is 350.

=== Climate ===
Okitipupa, located near the coast, experiences a humid tropical climate with one of the highest rainfall totals in the state. Rainfall is concentrated from April to October, while the dry season remains warm and moderately humid.

== List of Oba in Okitipupa Local Government ==
Oba Title	Name	Seat
Abodi Ikale	Oba Alayeluwa George Babatunde Faduyile, Adegun II	Paramount Ruler of Ikaleland
Jegun Idepe	Oba Michael Adetoye Obatuga	Ode Idepe (Okitipupa)
Rebuja Osooro	Oba Shedrach Gbadebo Bajowa, Lubokun IV	Paramount Ruler of Osooroland
Halu/Lapoki Ode-Aye	Oba Williams Akinmusayo Akinlade	Ode-Aye
Orungberuwa Ode-Erinje	Oba Oladele Fredrick Akinmoye	Ode-Erinje
Lumure Ayeka	Oba Frederick Bode Ayelomi	Ayeka
Olu Igodan-Lisa	Oba Paul Abiodun Akinsola	Igodan-Lisa
Obagberume Igbodigo	Oba John Ebunola Aiyeku, Akinyomi I	Igbodigo
Olura Igbinsin-Oloto	Vacant	Igbinsin-Oloto
Majuwa Moribodo-Ilutitun	Oba Earnest Adeoye Idepefo	Ilutitun Moribodo
Orofun Iju-Odo	Oba D.T Teniola	Iju-Odo
Olurowa Irowa	Oba Matthew Akinfolarin	Irowa
Odofin Ijuoke	Oba Oguntusin Orimisan Ayo	Ijuoke

== List of Obas in Irele Local Government ==
Oba Title	Name	Seat
Olofun Irele	Vacant	Ode-Irele
Odogbo Omen	Oba James Temilola Dahunsi	Ode-Omen
Laarogbo Akotogbo	Vacant	Akotogbo
Ahaba Ajagba	Oba Thomas Adesayo	Ode-Ajagba
Laragunshin Iyansan	Vacant	Ode-Iyansan
Olughogho Iju-Osun	Oba Samuel Oyegbemi	Iju-Osun

== List of Ikale Obas, Olojas And Baales in Odigbo LGA ==
- Olu of Ago-Alaye - Ago-Alaye (HRM Oba)
- Oloja of Agbabu - Agbabu (HRM Adegbemiro Adebuwa)
- Oloja of Lafe-Lepa - Lafe-lepa (HRM)
- Baale of Ayetedo - Ayetedo (HRM Lawson Olanegan Idebi)
- Oloja of Batedo - Batedo (HRM Femi Omowaye)
- Oloja of Ayesan - Ayesan (HRM)

== Education ==
=== Colleges and university ===
There is only one public university within the town limits: Ondo State University Of Science and Technology (OSUSTECH).

There are numerous additional colleges and universities outside the town limits in the Okitipupa Local Government Area, including the Federal University of Technology(FUTA), Adeyemi College Of Education (ACE) consortium, which includes the most selective liberal arts colleges in the Nigeria, and the Adekunle Ajasin University (AAUA),

=== Alternative and citywide schools ===
School name	Students	Est Date	Area	Type
Ondo State University Of Science and Technology	7000	September 2010	Okitipupa-Ikale	Public
Federal University of Technology	15,000	December 1981	Akure	Public
Adekunle Ajasin University	20,000	December 1999	Akungba-Akoko	Public
Ondo city polytechnic	N/A	2017	Ondo	Private
Rufus Giwa Polytechnic	N/A	1979	Owo	Public
Achievers University	N/A	2007	Owo	Private
Wesley University of Science and Technology	N/A	May 2007	Ondo	Private
Elizade University	N/A	July 2013	Ilara-Mokin	Private
Adeyemi College of Education	N/A	1964	Ondo	Public
University of Medical Sciences	N/A	March 2015	Ondo City	Public

=== Public primary schools ===
- (1)St. John's RCM, Okitipupa
- (2)St. Mary's RCM Okitipupa
- (3)L.A Primary School, Okitipupa
- (4)St. Joseph CAC, Okitipupa
- (5)St. Ezekiel C/S Primary School, Okititpupa
- (6)Methodist Primary School, Okitipupa
- (7)St. Paul's Anglican Primary School, Okitipupa
- (8)Ebenezer UNA Primary School, Okitipupa
- (9)The Apostolic Primary School, Okitipupa
- (10)Methodist Primary School, Idepe Okitipupa
- (11)Methodist Primary School,Abusoro Idepe okitipupa
- (12)St. Edward's RCM Idepe Okitipupa
- (13)St. Mary's C/S Primary School, Okitipupa
- (14)Ansarul Islam Primary School, Okitipupa
- (15)L.A. Primary School, Farm Settlement
- (16)Army Children School I, Okitipupa
- (17)Baptist Day School, Okitipupa
- (18)Army Children School II, Okitipupa
- St. Dominic's Mega Ayeka
- St. Raphael's C/S Oke-Igbala
- Methodist Primary School, Araromi Ayeka
- Methodist Primary School, Igodan Lisa
- St. Patrick's RCM, Okunmo
- Methodist Primary School, Ode-Erinje
- St. Banarbas Anglican School, Ode-Erinje
- St. Joseph RCM, Ode-Erinje
- C.P.S Ode-Igbodigo
- (1)L.A Practising School, Ode-Aye
- (2)C. P.S Orokin Aye
- (3)St. Christopher Anglican, School, Ode-Aye
- (4)St. Gregory RCM Ode-Aye
- (5)C.A.C Primary School, Ode-Aye
- (6)Baptist Day School, Ode-Aye
- (7)Methodist Primary School, Ode-Aye
- (8)St. Mathias RCM, Ode-Aye
- (9)Methodist Primary School, Okerisa, Aye
- (10)L.A. Primary School Igboluwoye Aye
- (11)L.A. Primary School, Igbo-Odofin
- (12)C.P.S Agbaje, Aye
- (13)L.A. Primary School, Moboro Aye
- (14)Methodist Primary School, Igorisa-Aye
- (1)L. A. Primary School, Ikoya
- (2)St. Joseph's RCM Ikoya
- (3)St. Paul's Anglican School, Ikoya
- (4)C.P.S Oagunte, Ikoya

St. Mathew's Anglican School, Oloto

- St. Benedict RCM Igbisin
- L.A Primary School, Igedege
- (1)Caring Heart Mega Primary School, Ilutitun
- (2)L.A. Primary School, Ilutitun
- (3)Ebenezer Anglican School, Ilutitun
- (4)St. Paul's C/S Primary School, Ilutitun
- (5)St. Peter's Primary School, Ilutitun
- (6)St. Augustine's RCM, School, Ilutitun
- (7)Methodist Primary School, Ilutitun
- (8)C/S Zion Primary School, Ilutitun
- (9)C. P. S Eleron, Ilutitun
- (1)Baptist Day School, Igbotako
- (2)ST. John's Anglican, Igbotako
- (3)St. Pius RCM Igbotako
- (4)Methodist Primary School, Igbotako
- (5)Baptist Day School, Igbotako
- (6)St. Stephen's Anglican, Igbotako
- (7)L.A. Pry School Ajewole Igbotako
- (8)A. Primary School, Sogbon, Igbotako
- (9)St. Andrew's Anglican School, Abusoro, Igbotako
- St. Paul's Anglican Erekiti-Luwoye
- L.A Primary School, Iju-Odo
- St. Paul's Anglican School, Iju-Odo
- St. Mathew's Anglican School, Iju-Oke Market
- L. A. Primary School, Ilado-Market
- St. Paul's Anglican School, Ilado, Olowosusi
- St. Columcille's R.C.M Irowa
- St. Benedict's R.C.M Iwada
- L.A. Primary School, Agbetu
- St. Andrew's R.C.M Ijuoke, Market
- L.A. Primary School, Erekiti, Jomo
- L.A. Primary School, Idiobilayo
- St. Anthony's R.C.M, Omotoso
- L.A. Primary School, Akinfosile Junction
- C.P.S Mobolorunduro
- C.P.S Wakajaye, Idera
- C.P.S Ayetoro I
- C. P. S Primary School, Adewinle
- C.P.S Ayetoro II
- L.A. Primary School, Okegbe
- C. P. S Idogun Omowole
- Egudu Primary School, Igbodigo
- Caring Heart Mega Primary School, Ayeka

=== Public secondary schools ===
- Idepe High School, Idepe-Okitipupa
- Igodan Lisa/Okunmo High School, Igodan Lisa
- Manuwa Memorial Grammar School, Iju-Odo
- Moribodo College, Ilutitun-Osooro *Comprehensive High School, Ilutitun Osooro
- Methodist High School, Okitipupa
- Ofedepe Comprehensive High School, okitipupa
- Stella Maris College, okitipupa
- Community High School, Erekiti-Luwoye
- Community Grammar school, Igbotako
- Ayeka Igbodigo High School, igbodigo
- Erinje Grammar School, Ode-Erinje
- Ikoya Grammar School, Ikoya
- Lubokun Comprehensive High School, Igbotako
- Moribodo College, Ilutitun-Osooro
- Omotoso Community Grammar School, Omotoso
- Ogundubuja High School, Okitipupa
- Community High School, Mobolorunduro-Okitipupa
- Ikale High School, Igbisin-Oloto
- Danike High School, Ode-Aye
- Comprehensive High School, Ode-Aye
- Unity Secondary School, Ode-Aye
- Layelu High School, Ode-Aye
- Baptist Grammar School, Ode-Aye

=== Private secondary schools ===
- Ultimate International High School, Ode-Aye
- Victory High School, Ilutitun, Osooro
- Deal Prospects High School, Okitipupa
- Success Secondary School, Okitipupa
- Trinity College, Olorintedo
- Saint Josiah's College, Okitipupa
- Christ Unity High School, Ode-Aye, Okitipupa
- Emmanuel Royal College, Okitipupa
- Esther-Kawe Secondary School, Okitipupa
- Wisdom Assembly College, Ode-Ayeka
- Atoyebi Memorial Secondary School, Wakajaye, Okitipupa
- Ibukun olu C.A.C secondary school, okitipua
- Corner Stone Girls’ College, Okitipupa
- Mercuri Model Secondary School, Ikoya
- Sarah International College, Okitipupa
- Holy Trinity College, Okitipupa
- St, William secondary school, Okitipupa
- Optimum victory college, Okitipupa
- Elisiry International High School, Okitipupa
- Goshenland Academy School, Okitipupa
- Compendium Academy, Okitipupa
- Yalamatrix School, Igbodigo, Okitipupa

== Military Base ==
- Okitipupa is home to the 19th Battalion Naquora Barracks.

== Okitipupa Council Areas ==
Opa

- Okitipupa (Opa)
- Ayeka/Igbodigo (Opa)
- Idepe (Opa)
- Igbotako (Oshoro)
- Ilutitun (Oshoro)
- Ijudo (Oshoro)
- Ikoya
- Ode aye
- Araromi obu
- Kajola
- Ode Erinje
- Igodan-Lisa/Okumo
- Omotosho
- Erekiti
- Ode-Erinje

== Areas in Ikale Land ==
IKALE KINGDOM

- Akinfosile
- Ayeka
- Okunmo
- Ayetedo Aye
- Ayede
- Ayila
- Agbetu
- Araromi Ayeka
- Abusoro Idepe
- Abusoro
- Agbaje Aye
- Agbabu Aye
- Agric
- Batedo Aye
- Ode-Erinje
- Erekiti
- Ikoya-Ikale
- Igodan-Lisa
- Igbotako
- Igbodigo
- Iwada
- Irowa
- Ilu-Titun
- Igodan
- Igorisa-Aye
- Iju-Oke
- Igboluwoye-Aye
- Igbo-Odofin
- Ilado
- Iju-Odo
- Igbinsin
- Idera
- Idiobilayo
- umoboro Aye
- umobi Aye
- Epewi Aye
- oke-Idebi village
- Luwoye
- Igedege
- Idogun Omowole
- Jeremiah
- Okitipupa (Rural)
- Ode-Idepe
- Omotoso
- Oke-Igbala
- Ode-Aye
- Olowosusi
- Orokin Aye
- Olorintedo
- Igbo Odofin Aye
- Oloto
- Ominla
- Mobolorunduro
- Wakajaye

== Notable people ==
- Akintunde Aduwo, former Governor, Western Region and navy vice admiral
- Olusegun Agagu, former Governor of Ondo State
- Oluyemi Joseph Bajowa, former Quartermaster General, Nigerian Army, retired Major General.
- Jimoh Ibrahim, lawyer and business man
