= Michael Onunkun =

Nigerian politician

Senator
- Constituency: Ondo West Senatorial District

Personal details
- Died: 16 May 2024 (Age 98)
- Occupation: Politician

Michael Onunkun was a Nigerian politician. He served as a senator in the Second Republic representing Ondo West Senatorial District, which is now Ondo South, in the old Ondo State from 1979 to 1983. He died on 16 May 2024 at the age of 98.
