= Ondo West =

- LGA
- Interactive map of Ondo West
- Country: Nigeria
- State: Ondo State
- Headquarter: Ondo

Government
  - Body: Osemawe-in-Council
  - Oba: Osemawe of Ondo Kingdom

Area
  - Total: 970 km^{2} (370 sq mi)

Population (2006)
  - Total: 283,672
  - Density: 290/km^{2} (760/sq mi)
- Time zone: UTC+1 (WAT)
- Postal code: 351

Ondo West is a Local Government Area in Ondo State, Nigeria. Its headquarters are in the town of Ondo.

It has an area of 970 km^{2} and a population of 283,672 at the 2006 census.

The postal code of the area is 351.

There are four higher institutions in Ondo West: Adeyemi College of Education established in 1964 by the Federal Government of Nigeria and recently upgraded to a Federal University of Education; National Institute for Educational Planning and Administration (NIEPA) established in 1992 by the Federal Government; Wesley University established in 2008 by the Methodist Church, Nigeria; and the University of Medical Sciences, Ondo established by the Ondo State Government in 2015 to train medical and health professionals.

== Climate ==
Ondo West has a humid tropical climate with abundant rainfall throughout the April–October rainy season. The dry season remains warm, and temperatures vary only slightly during the year.
