= Ebunoluwa Adejuyigbe =

Nigerian paediatrician and academic administrator

Ebunoluwa Aderonke Adejuyigbe
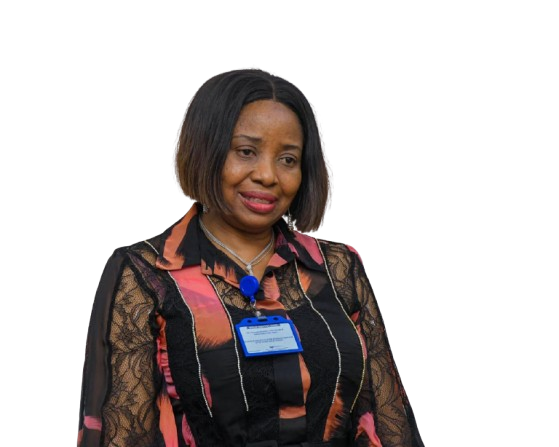
- Professor Ebunoluwa A. Adejuyigbe, Vice-Chancellor, University of Medical Sciences, Ondo
- Occupations: Paediatrician, researcher, academic administrator
- Known for: Neonatal health; infant feeding; paediatric infectious diseases

Academic background
- Education: Obafemi Awolowo University

Academic work
- Discipline: Paediatrics and Child Health
- Institutions: Obafemi Awolowo University; University of Medical Sciences, Ondo

Ebunoluwa Aderonke Adejuyigbe is a Nigerian paediatrician, researcher, and academic administrator. She is a Professor of Paediatrics and Child Health and, since July 2025, the Vice-Chancellor of the University of Medical Sciences (UNIMED), Ondo. She is the first female substantive Vice-Chancellor of that university.

== Early life and education ==
Adejuyigbe hails from the Akoko North-East Local Government Area of Ondo State, Nigeria. She attended Girls High School, Gindiri, Jos (1975–1980), and later studied health sciences and medicine at the Obafemi Awolowo University (then University of Ife), earning her MBChB in 1987.

== Academic and clinical career ==
She began her career at the Obafemi Awolowo University Teaching Hospital Complex (OAUTHC) as a consultant paediatrician and later joined the university's Faculty of Health Sciences. Adejuyigbe served as executive director of the Central Office of Research at Obafemi Awolowo University and was involved in several national and international research collaborations in child health and neonatal medicine.

=== Career timeline ===
- Consultant Paediatrician, OAUTHC (1990s–2000s)
- Professor of Paediatrics, Obafemi Awolowo University (2010–2025)
- Executive Director, Central Office of Research, OAU (2019–2025)
- Vice-Chancellor, University of Medical Sciences, Ondo (2025–present)

== Research ==
Adejuyigbe's research focuses on neonatal survival, infant feeding, and paediatric infectious diseases in low-resource settings. Her publications are widely cited in global child health research.

=== Selected publications ===
- Adejuyigbe, E. A.; Hill, Z.; Odebiyi, A. I. (2015). "Why not bathe the baby today? A qualitative study of thermal care beliefs and practices in four African sites". BMC Pediatrics. 15 156. doi:10.1186/s12887-015-0470-0. PMC 4607092. PMID 26466994.
- Adejuyigbe, E. A.; Odebiyi, A. I.; Aina, O.; Bamiwuye, S. (2008). "Feeding and care of low-birthweight babies in two rural communities in south-western Nigeria". Maternal & Child Nutrition. 4 (1): 55–64. doi:10.1111/j.1740-8709.2007.00101.x. PMC 6860800. PMID 18171407.
- Adejuyigbe, E.; Orji, E. O. (2008). "Infant feeding intentions and practices of HIV-positive mothers in southwestern Nigeria". Journal of Human Lactation. 24 (3): 303–310. doi:10.1177/0890334408317765. PMID 18689717.
- Odebiyi, A. I.; Adejuyigbe, E. A. (2014). "Community perceptions of neonatal illness in rural southwest Nigeria". BMC Pediatrics. 14: 189. doi:10.1186/1471-2431-14-189. PMC 4118202.
- Adejuyigbe, E. (2017). "Neonatal sepsis in developing countries: Challenges and future directions". African Journal of Medicine and Medical Sciences. 46 (3): 215–225.

== Professional service and honours ==
She is a Fellow of the Nigerian Academy of Medicine and has served as vice-president of the African Society of Paediatric Infectious Diseases (AfSPID) and co-chair of Nigeria's National Child Health Technical Working Committee.

== Vice-Chancellorship at UNIMED ==
Adejuyigbe was appointed the third substantive Vice-Chancellor of the University of Medical Sciences, Ondo, and assumed office on 23 July 2025. National coverage noted she is the university's first female Vice-Chancellor.

As Vice-Chancellor, she has addressed operational and student-welfare issues; in October 2025 the university said tuition fees remained unchanged. She has also said her administration would prioritise the use of technology to support teaching and research.

In her inaugural remarks, she outlined goals related to student-centred learning, institutional partnerships, and quality improvement in medical education.

== Personal life ==
Adejuyigbe is married with children. She is active in community health advocacy and youth mentorship initiatives.
