= Anikeade Funke-Treasure =

Nigerian Broadcaster

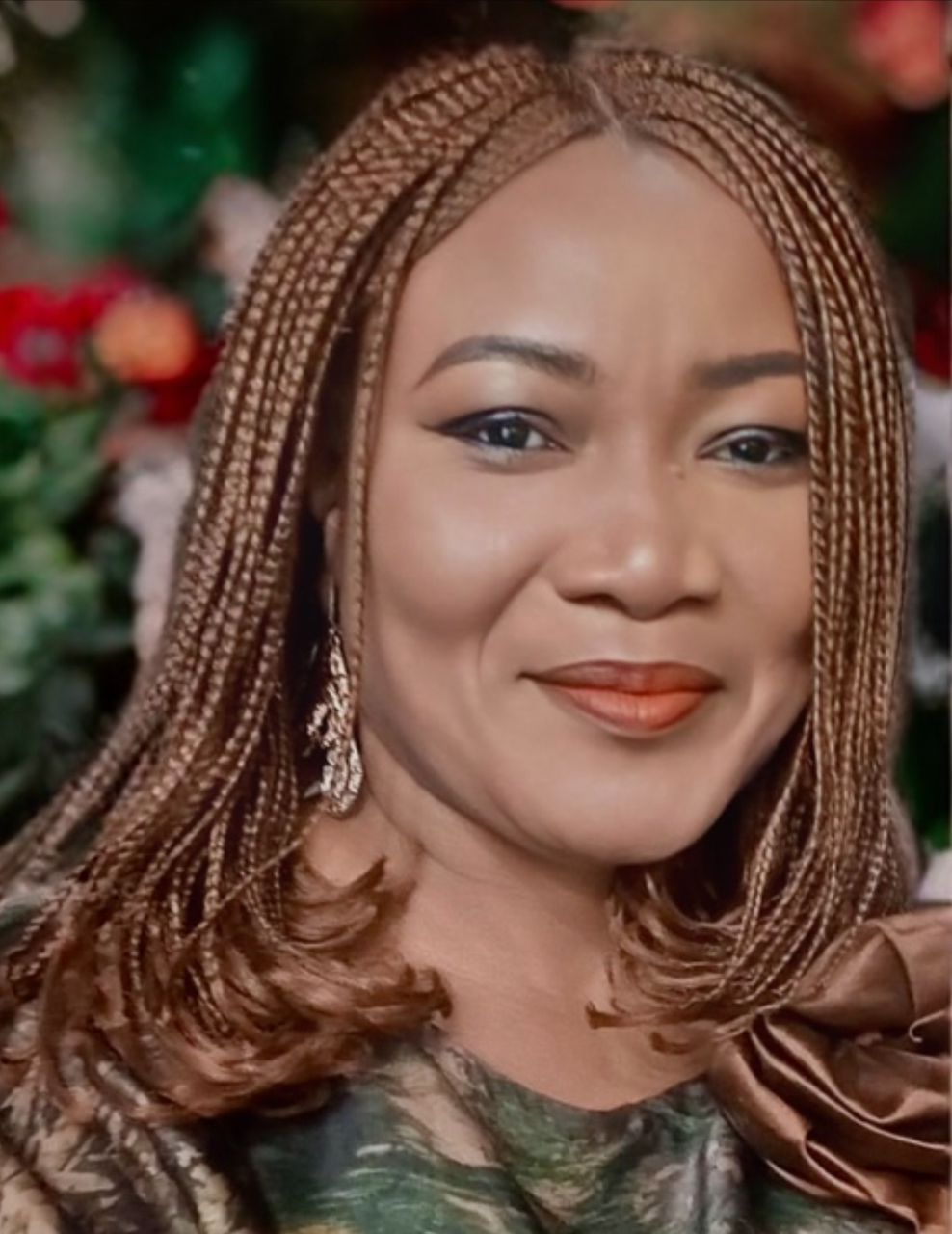
- Born: Nigeria
- Citizenship: Nigerian
- Education: Adeyemi College of Education (BA, English Language); Master's degree in Journalism and Media Studies
- Occupations: Broadcast journalist, media trainer, mentor, speech and leadership coach, event compere
- Years active: 1996–present
- Organization(s): Media Mentoring Initiative; Illuminate Nigeria Development Network
- Known for: Advocacy for women and girls; Sanitary Pad Media Campaign
- Notable work: Three published books
- Awards: Voice of Dignity Award (2025) Gender Mainstreaming Awards Positive Role Model Award finalist for West Africa (2024)                       Iconic Brand Africa Award – Social Impact of the Year (2024) Girl Force Movement S.H.E.R.O Award (2022)

Anikeade Funke-Treasure is a Nigerian broadcast journalist, certified media trainer, mentor, speech and leadership coach, event compere, and author. She is known for her advocacy for women and girls and is frequently invited to serve as a panellist and moderator at conferences. She has authored three books.

== Early life ==
She is a graduate of English language from the Adeyemi College of Education, Ondo, Ondo State, She also holds a master's degree in Journalism and Media studies including other local and international training certificates. She is the Initiator of Media Mentoring Initiative which runs an Internship scheme for student and practicing journalists.

Her broadcasting journey began in 1996 during her National Youth Service Corps (NYSC) posting to the Broadcasting Corporation of Abia State, where she produced current-affairs programmes before moving into presentation and news anchoring.

== Career ==
Funke-Treasure is the convener of the Sanitary Pad Media Campaign (SPMC) initiative, setup in 2020 to combat period poverty in Nigeria. The campaign provides Pad Scholarships, a one-year supply of menstrual products to thousands of indigent schoolgirls across multiple states.

She founded the Media Mentoring Initiative Documentary Fellowship for Students (MMi-DFS) in 2010, designed to nurture young storytellers. The program debuted in 2025, and it provides mentorship and production grants to students to create documentaries, with a recent focus on exploring Yoruba cultural heritage.

She also hosts the Table Tennis Championship (F3TC), a sports-based empowerment program for girls in secondary schools. It combines athletic competition with life-skills sessions covering financial literacy and reproductive health.

== Awards and recognitions ==
- Voice of Dignity Award (2025) Presented by the Heroes of Tomorrow Africa Foundation in the United States for humanitarian impact and advocacy addressing period poverty and menstrual health for women and girls.
- Gender Mainstreaming Awards (2024) Recognized at the pan-African awards organized by Business Engage and powered by Accenture; she received recognition as a Positive Role Model Award finalist for West Africa.
- Iconic Brand Africa Award Social Impact of the Year category (2024) for her advocacy and community initiatives.
- Girl Force Movement S.H.E.R.O Award (2022) – Awarded for contributions to improving the lives of girls and supporting the Girl Force Movement community.
- Her organization, Illuminate Nigeria Development Network, was also recognized at the Gender Mainstreaming Awards for initiatives supporting young women and disability inclusion.

== Selected works ==
- Memories of Grandma
- The Clergy and the Spoken Word Industry
- The pronunciation guide for English speakers
