= Okitipupa Oil Palm =

Palm oil processing firm

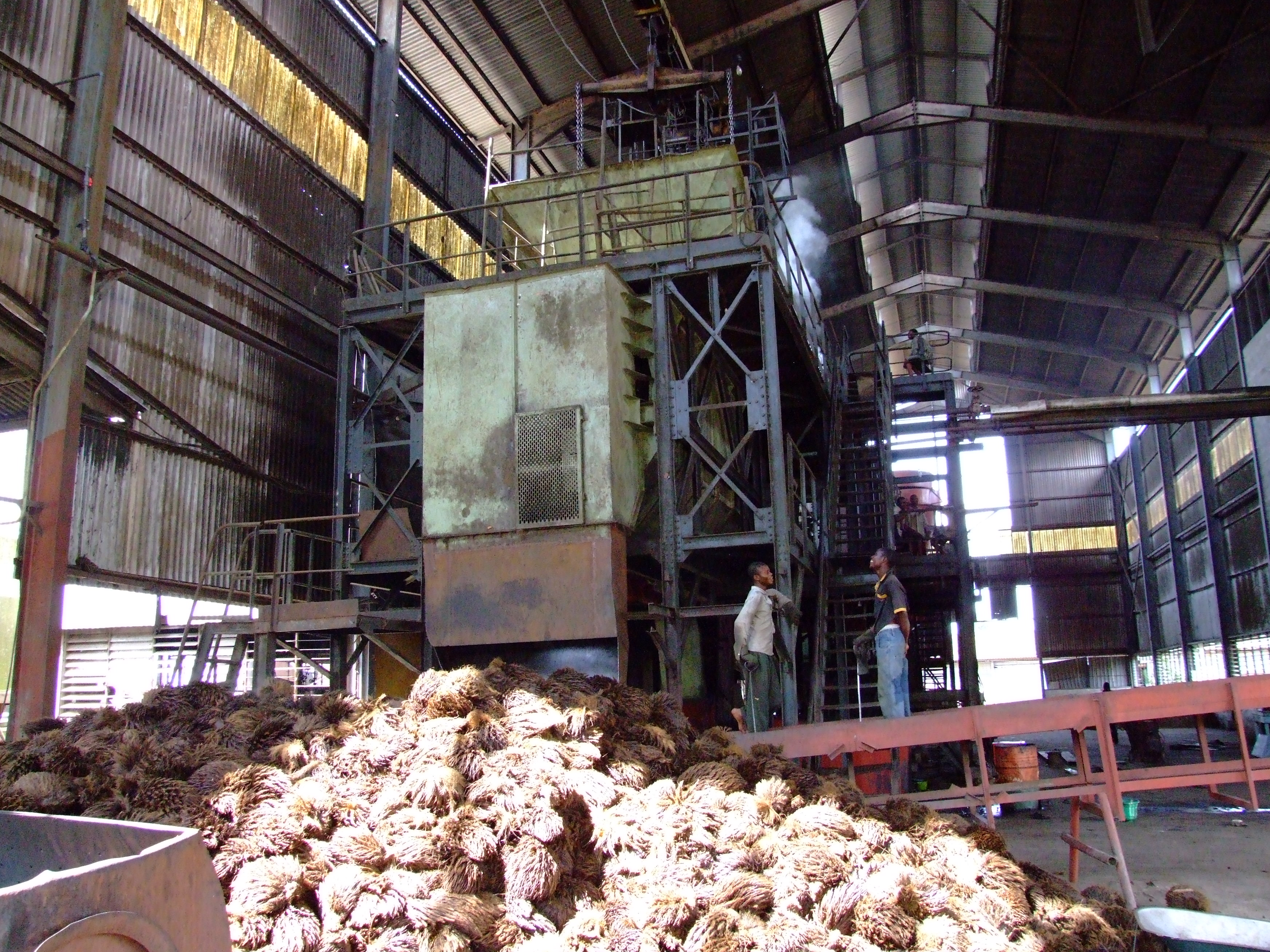
- Oil mill in Okiti-Pupa
- Industry: Palm oil
- Founded: 1976

Okitipupa Oil Palm Plc is an oil palm processing firm that manages oil palm estates in Southern Ondo State and processes raw materials from its plantation. The firm's estates located close to the town of Okitipupa in Ilutitun, Ikoya, Irele, Iyansan, Igbotako and Apoi.

== History ==
A Nucleus oil palm estate project was initiated by the Western Nigerian government under Adeyinka Adebayo as a way to boost the economy of small towns and rural areas. These oil palm estates were developed beginning in 1969 and additional acreage were to be developed between the years 1975 and 1983, initially planned to include 6,000 hectares of planted oil palm fruits and 4,000 hectares provided by small scale farmers. The expansion was to be financed by the Western State government and by multilateral loans. In 1974, an oil processing mill was installed at Okitipupa and in 1976, the firm was incorporated as a limited liability company. However, the planned expansion was inhibited by financial difficulties and reduced government interest in the project.

Another mill was installed in 1993 at Ipoke.

In 2001, indebtedness led to decreased production and financial performance by the firm.
