= Dan Nwanyanwu =

Nigerian politician, businessman and lawyer

Daniel Nwanyanwu

Chairman of the Labour Party
- In office 2004–2014

Personal details
- Born: 23 November 1959 (age 66) Amuzu-Amaimo, Imo State, Nigeria
- Profession: Politician; lawyer
- Website: Official Website

Dan Nwanyanwu mni, OFR (born 23 November 1959) is a Nigerian politician, businessman and lawyer who was chairman of the Labour Party (LP) from 2004 until 2014.

== Background ==
Nwanyanwu was born in Amuzu-Amaimo in the Ikeduru Local Government Area of Imo State. He received his early education at St. James Primary school in Amuzu and Oraifite Boys’ High School in Anambra State. He studied Labour Management Relations at the School of Business, Howard University, Washington D.C.

He worked with Union Bank between 1979-1993 and during his appointment, held several roles within the National Union of Banks, Insurance and Financial Institutions Employees (NUBIFIE), rising to the role of National Treasurer and subsequently National President from 1989. The latter appointment automatically made him a member of the National Executive Council of the Nigeria Labour Congress (NLC).

In 1992, he attended the National Institute for Policy and Strategic Studies, Kuru, Jos and was awarded "Member of the National Institute" (mni). In February 1993, he resigned his appointment with the Union Bank of Nigeria to enable him to finish the programme. He finished his law Degree in 1998 and proceeded to the Nigerian Law School, eventually being called to the Nigerian Bar in the year 2000. He earned a master's degree in law (LL.M) in University of Lagos and did his pupilage under the close supervision of Frederick Rotimi Williams in the Chief Rotimi Williams Chambers.

== Political career ==
=== Labour Party ===
In 2004, Nwanyanwu was drafted to lead the" Party for Social Democracy" (PSD) formed by the Nigerian Labour Congress, which led to his emergence as its National Chairman in a well-attended convention. The party was later renamed ‘Labour Party’ to reflect its new ideals. He started from the scratch to organize and lead a political party hitherto unknown and at the expiration of his first term, he was re-elected in December 2009 as the party's National Chairman at a Convention held in Abuja. Under his leadership, the LP secured governorship of Ondo State, with Olusegun Mimiko.

In a Convention in October 2014, he did not put himself up for re-election as the National Chairman of the Party having served for 2 consecutive terms and more (10 years), even though there was no constitutional impediment against his re-election. He was unanimously elected by the Convention in session as the chairman, Board of Trustees of the Party. In February 2015, he resigned as the chairman, Board of Trustees of Labour Party and also withdrew his membership of the Party.

=== National Conference ===
In 2014, he represented Labour Party at the National Conference as one of the 492 delegates. At the Conference, he insisted on the unity of the country, good governance and the development of solid minerals nationwide. He equally fought for transparency in government and insisted on stronger and stricter punishment for corrupt officials of government. Also, because of his background as a union leader and representative of the Labour Party, he advocated for employment of both skilled and unskilled youths across the country.

== Titles ==
Nwanyanwu was the Pro-Chancellor and Chairman of the Governing Council of Adekule Ajasin University, Akungba, Akoko in Ondo State, (AAUA).

The Osemawe of Ondo kingdom, HRM Oba Dr. Victor Adesimbo Kiladejo (Jilo 111), on the 500th Anniversary of Osemawa Dynasty, conferred on him the title of Otun Atunluse of Ondo Kingdom on 17 July 2010, in recognition of his contributions to humanity. President Goodluck Jonathan conferred the National Honours of Officer of the Order of the Federal Republic, (OFR) on him on 17 September 2012.

== Personal life ==
He is married to Jane Onyinye Nwanyanwu and they have four children. Dan Nwanyanwu is currently not involved in partisan politics but is a vocal commentator on political and economic issues.
