= Adesegun Fatusi =

Nigerian public health professor (born 1962)

Vice Chancellor of University of Medical Sciences, Ondo
- Incumbent
- Assumed office March 2020
- Preceded by: Friday Okonofua

Personal details
- Born: December 1962 (age 63)
- Citizenship: Nigerian
- Education: Obafemi Awolowo University; Hebrew University (MPH)
- Known for: Public health

Adesegun Fatusi (born December 1962) is a Nigerian professor of community medicine and public health. He was the former provost of the College of Health Sciences at Obafemi Awolowo University, Ile-Ife, and the current vice-chancellor of University of Medical Sciences, Ondo.

== Education ==
Adesegun Fatusi graduated from Obafemi Awolowo University (OAU) in 1987 with a Bachelor of Medicine, Bachelor of Surgery degree with Distinction in Community Health and the Lawrence Omole Award for the best-graduating student in Community Health. He obtained a Master's of Public health from Hebrew University Braun School of Public Health and Community Medicine and became a fellow of the West African College of Physicians in 1995.

== Professional and administrative career ==
Adesegun is a Fellow of the West African College of Physicians, and a professor of Community Medicine and Public health at the Obafemi Awolowo University, as well as Honorary Consultant Physician at the Obafemi Awolowo University Teaching Hospitals Complex, Ile-Ife, Nigeria. Within the university, he has been appointed at various times as Head of department, Director of Population and Reproductive Health Program, Director of the Institute of Public Health, and Provost of the College of Health Sciences. He has served and continue to serve the country in various roles in the discipline of public health, particularly in leading the development of national policy documents in the areas of adolescent health and youth development, HIV and AIDS, and sexual, reproductive health and maternal health. He has also led several national research, policy, and program initiatives in Nigeria and beyond. Among others, he was a Member Ministerial Committee that developed Nigeria's Health Sector Reform Programme in 2004, and the Technical Working Group for the new National Health Policy developed in 2016.

Fatusi is the president of the Society for Adolescent and Young People's Health in Nigeria and currently chairs Nigeria's National Technical Working Group on Adolescent Health and Development, who also serves as a member of the Lancet (global) Commission on Adolescent Health and well-being. He is the founder of Campus Health and Rights Initiative and the chief executive officer of Paaneah Foundation – a young adolescent-focused and youth development organisation based in Ota – and currently holds the position of vice president (sub-Saharan Africa) for the International Association for Adolescent Health.
As a seasoned researcher, he has worked as a lead research consultant for several national and international organizations, he recently joined the Guttmacher Institute in 2019 as the director of international research.

== Honours and recognitions ==
Professor Adesegun has received several recognitions and awards and has also served as a consultant to several government agencies as well as international development organisations, including WHO, UNFPA, UNICEF, UNDP, UNAIDS, World Bank, USAID and CDC-funded programmes, and DfID-funded projects. He won the Federal Government's award as the best candidate in the Part I Examinations of the Faculty of Public health, National Postgraduate Medical College of Nigeria in 1992. He also won the summa cum laude honours and was the best graduating student among others.
