= Adesimbo Victor Kiladejo =

44th Osemawe, or traditional ruler of the Ondo Kingdom

- Osemawe of Ondo

44th Osemawe of Ondo Kingdom
- Reign: 1 December 2006 – present
- Coronation: 29 December 2008
- Predecessor: Festus Ibidapo Adesanoye
- Born: Adesimbo Victor Kiladejo Adenrele Ademefun; November 11, 1953 (age 72); Ondo, Nigeria
- Spouse: Olori Comfort Olayinka Kiladejo
- Issue: 5 children
- House: Okuta Ruling House
- Father: Prince Gbadebo Adedoyin Kiladejo
- Mother: Julianah Olusola Kiladejo

Dr. Oba Adesimbo Victor Kiladejo Adenrele Ademefun Kiladejo PGDRH CPHQ FAGP, or Jilo III, was appointed the 44th Osemawe, or traditional ruler of the Ondo Kingdom in Nigeria on 1 December 2006. He was crowned on 29 December 2008 at a ceremony attended by dignitaries including the Ondo State Governor, Olusegun Agagu, the Ooni of Ife, Oba Okunade Sijuade, and the leader of Afenifere, Chief Reuben Fasoranti.

== Birth, early life and education ==
Kiladejo was born in Ondo, on November 11, 1953, to the family of Prince Gbadebo Adedoyin Kiladejo (Edilokun) and his wife, Prophetess Julianah Olusola Kiladejo (nee Ajayi). He is the eldest of the 22 children of his father, who was of the Okuta Ruling House; and a direct descendant of Púpùpú, the founding monarch of Ondo.

Kiladejo was educated at St. Patrick's Primary School, Akure, and Ondo Anglican Grammar School, Ondo. In 1974, Kiladejo gained admission to University of Ife (now Obafemi Awolowo University), to study Medicine. He received a Federal Government scholarship for his education. He obtained B.Sc. (Hons.), 2nd Class Upper Division, in Health Sciences; as well as the Bachelor of Medicine and Bachelor of Surgery (MBChB) degree, in 1978 and 1981, respectively. Kiladejo later enrolled at Liverpool University, in the UK, for his postgraduate training, in Reproductive Health. He is a United States Certified Professional in Healthcare Quality (CPHQ), and Consultant to Liverpool Associate on Tropical Health (LATH).

In his primary and secondary school days, Kiladejo served as Health Prefect, and House Prefect respectively. At the University of Ife, he was a member of the Students’ Representative Board; and was elected as Class Representative when he was on postgraduate training at Liverpool.

== Work experience and professional practice ==
After his graduation from the University of Ife, Kiladejo did his internship at the State Specialist Hospital, Ado Ekiti, and his mandatory one-year National Youth Service (NYSC) at Agbor General Hospital, Agbor, Bendel State (now in Delta State). He earned a letter of commendation from, as well as an automatic appointment offered by the then Bendel State Government. Kiladejo later took up appointment with the Ondo State Health Management Board, where he served in various capacities; rose to become a Principal Medical Officer; and was later appointed as the Medical Director in charge of two Local Government hospitals – Ekiti South and Ekiti Southwest Local Government Areas, of present Ekiti State. He resigned his appointment in December 1989, to establish his own private practice – the Kiladejo Royal Hospital Limited, Lagos.

Kiladejo is a member of the Nigerian Medical Association; Association of General and Private Medical Practitioners of Nigeria; Healthcare Providers Association; Society for Quality Healthcare in Nigeria; World Organisation of Family Doctors; American Association of Family Physicians; and American Institute of Ultrasound in Medicine, among others.

Before ascending the throne, and in his capacity as an investor, Kiladejo chaired the Kiladejo Royal Hospitals; COVAC Investment; Julian Apartments; and Merit Diagnostics, among others.

He serve currently as the Chancellor of University of Medical Science, Ondo (UNIMED) as appointed by His Excellency, Governor Lucky Aiyedatiwa.

== Ascension of the throne of Òsemàwé ==
Kiladejo ascended the throne on December 1, 2006, as the 44th Òsemàwé and Paramount Ruler of Ondo Kingdom. He was formally crowned on December 29, 2008. He is the third Òsemàwé in history to come from the Jilo linage of the Okuta Ruling House.

=== Rallying point for development ===
Kiladejo encourages indigenes and non-indigenes alike to establish businesses in the Kingdom; and drove the Ondo City Vision initiative, which led to the formal proclamation of Ondo as a City, in December 2015. Earlier, in the year 2010, Àbáìyé presided over the celebration of the 500th year of the Òsemàwé dynasty. One of the more important outcomes of the latter celebration was the production of a book, titled The Evolution of Ondo Kingdom over 500 years, 1510-2010+, edited by Professor S. Ibidapo Ajayi, of the University of Ibadan, Nigeria; and published in Ibadan, by Spectrum Books, in 2013.

One of the very first community radio stations in Nigeria, “Eki FM,” debuted under Kiladejo; just as the community witnessed the establishment of three universities, Adeyemi Federal University of Education, University of Medical Sciences, and Wesley University – federal, State, and private, respectively – under Kiladejo. Kiladejo also oversaw the reconstruction of the Moférere Market, and the city's sports stadium. Under Kiladejo, the Redeemed Christian Church of God established "the biggest intensive care centre" at the University of Medical Sciences Teaching Hospital, Ondo.

In his individual capacity, and as a medical doctor, Kiladejo periodically provides free health services to the aged, inmates of correctional centres, diabetics, and hypertensive patients in the Kingdom, through his non-governmental organization, “The Oba Kiladejo Crown Foundation,” which also organizes – in partnership with the US-based SMILE Foundation – an annual festival of surgery for children with cleft lips and palate, in the community. Kiladejo also donated a well-equipped Medical Centre to Wesley University, Ondo, the institution where he served as the pioneer Chancellor, for some 10 years. The University is owned by the Methodist Church of Nigeria.

=== Culture and development anchor ===
Kiladejo coordinates the 44 traditional festivals celebrated by the Ondo Èkímògún people every year. He holds court at the Palace ùghà (traditional consultative assembly) once in a week, and provides leadership to the Ondo Development Committee (ODC), the Kingdom’s official anchor of the various developmental initiatives, to which every Òsemàwé has served as Patron since it debuted in 1986.

== Awards and recognitions ==
Kiladejo is a Paul Harris Fellow of Rotary International. He also holds the fellowship of the Association of General and Private Medical Practitioners. Among the several recognitions he has earned are, African Leader of Integrity Award; Nigeria Merit Award in the Sphere of Human Medicines; Award of Excellence, by Ibadan Golf Club; Award of Excellence, by National Healthcare Providers Association of Nigeria; Service of Humanity Award, by Rotary International District 9119; Grand Commander of Peace and Security of Nigeria (HCPSN), by National Security and Civil Defence Corps (NSCDC); Award of Excellence, by Zenith International; Most Impactful Royal Father of the Year 2017; and distinguished member of 50 Outstanding Traditional Rulers in Nigeria.

Kiladejo is a recipient of the Obafemi Awolowo University (Health Sciences) Distinguished Alumni Honorary Award; the 2021 Distinguished Alumnus of Obafemi Awolowo University; and Honorary Citizenship of Texas, USA, in 2015. He was conferred with the prestigious national honour of, Commander of the Order of the Federal Republic (CFR), by President Goodluck Ebele Jonathan, GCFR, in the same year, 2015.

Kiladejo is the sole representative of Southwest monarchs in the Standing Security Committee, of the National Council of Traditional Rulers of Nigeria (NACTRN).

Kiladejo was conferred with the honorary doctorate degree (D.Sc.) in Management Science, by Wesley University, Ondo, in 2011. In 2014, His Imperial Majesty became the recipient of yet another doctorate degree, LLD (Honouris Causa), of Adekunle Ajasin University (formerly Ondo State University), Akungba-Akoko, Ondo State.

== Personal life ==
In 1986, Kiladejo married Olori Comfort Olayinka Kiladejo, who was born into the family of Chief Joshua Aladejana and Madam Deborah Aladejana (nee Adetula) of the Ojumu family in Owo. Together, they have five children and several grandchildren.
