= Osemawe of Ondo Kingdom =

The Osemawe of Ondo Kingdom is the paramount Yoruba king of Ondo Kingdom a city in Ondo State, southwestern Nigeria. The "Osemawe title" was coined from the phrase "Ese-omo-re" adopted from the comment made by the late Alaafin Oluaso during the birth of his daughter called Olu pupupu who later settled in Ondo Kingdom. The people of Ondo Kingdom are generally called Egin.

== History ==
The Osemawe title of Ondo Kingdom was instituted in 1510, when princess Pupupu, a powerful daughter of the late Alaafin of Oyo, king Oluaso left the palace with the royal entourage in a bid to settle far from her father's palace. She settled on a hill called Oke Agunla in Ondo town. On arrival of this princess at Oke Ogunla a smoke rising from far below was spotted by a man called Esiri who traced the smoke to know its source. On getting to the hill where the smoke was spotted, he met princess Pupupu and her royal entourage. He took them to a village in Ondo Kingdom called Oriden. The villagers were very happy to meet the powerful princess and exclaimed “Edu do, edo do, idi edo!” where the name of the Kingdom Ondo Kingdom was formed.

== Rulers ==
About 43 rulers had ruled with the title of Osemawe of Ondo Kingdom since the inception of the title.

=== 16th-century rulers ===
Princess Olu Pupupu ascended the throne as the first Osemawe of the Ekimogun people of Ondo Kingdom and reign from 1516 to 1530. Before her death, she gave birth two sons, the eldest was named Airo Pupupu and the younger one was named Luju Pupupu. Airo Pupupu later ascended the throne after the demise of his mother in 1530. He reigned for 30 years, between 1530 and 1560. After the death of Airo Pupupu in 1560, Luju Pupupu the younger brother of Airo Pupupu ascended the throne in 1561 and reigned for 29 years, between 1561 and 1590. After the demise of Luju Pupupu in 1590, prince Okuta Airo Pupupu the son of Airo Pupupu succeeded his uncle, Luju Pupupu in 1590 and reigned for 24 years, between 1590 and 1614.

=== 17th-century rulers ===
After the demise of Okuta Airo Pupupu, his brother, Luyare ascended the throne and reigned for 16 years, 1614 to 1630. After the demise of Luyare in 1630, Foyi (Awuro), a brave warrior and a descendant of Luju Pupupu ascended the throne and reigned for 19 years, between 1630 and 1649. Thereafter, Leyo Luju Pupupu, the last child of Luju Pupupu ascended the throne after the death of Foyi (Awuro) and reigned for 19 years, between 1649 and 1688. After the death of Leyo Luju Pupupu in 1668, prince Gbaji (Ogbode), the son of Okuta ascended the throne and reigned between 1668 and 1685. Thereafter, Liyen, the grandson of Luju Pupupu succeeded Gbaji (Ogbode) and reigned between 1685 and 1702.

=== 18th-century ruler ===
After the demise of Liyen in 1702, Bajumu, a great warrior who was the son of Foyi ascended the throne. He engaged in a war with a neighboring town against the wish of the people and when he returned from the battle, he was rejected and was succeeded by Aperuwa (Olu-Okun), the son of Gbaji who reigned between 1711 and 1716. After his demise in 1716, he was succeeded by Gbedegbede, a descendant of Leyo and only reigned for one year, between 1716 and 1717. Following the demise of Gbedegbede in 1717, Lamele succeeded him and reigned for 15 years before he died in 1731. In 1731, Iganmude who was a grandson of Okuta ascended the throne following the demise of Lamele. He created Sokoti and Losare quarters during his regime and later died in 1748. Olowolaiye, a grandson of Okuta became the ruler following the death of Aganmude. He reigned for 11 years, from 1748 to 1759. Following the death of Aganmude in 1759, another grandson of Okuta called Jogunde ascended the throne. He reigned for 18 years, from 1759 to 1777. Thereafter, Terere who was a grandson of Luju ascended the throne following the demise of Jogunde in 1777. He established the Eku festival in memory of Owu war before his death in 1786. He was succeeded by his first son called Ajisowo who reigned between 1786 and 1802.

== 19th-century ruler ==
Following the demise of Ajisowo in 1802, Arobiete who was a descendant of Foyi ascended the throne and reigned for 9 years. After the death of Arobieke in 1811 Iyanlola a son of Jogunde ascended the throne and reigned for 3 years, between 1811 and 1814. Thereafter, Odunola also known as Ojagodolokun, a descendant of Lamele ascended the throne in 1814 after the death of Iyanlola. He reigned for 3 years, from 1814 to 1817. He was succeeded by his eldest son known as Jilu. His name Jilu was coined from the fact that he enjoyed drumming. He reigned for 5 years. Following the demise of Jilu in 1826, he was succeeded by Olowolakun who ruled for 7 years, from 1826 to 1833.

Oba Akingbohungbe, Osemawe of Ondo The most pivotal figure from this family was Oba Jimosun Akingbohungbe, who ruled as the Osemawe from 1901 to 1925. His reign was during the early period of British colonial rule in Nigeria.

Oba Rufus Adesokeji Aderele (Tewogboye II), son of Oba Tewogboye I ascended the throne after the dethronement Oba Fidipote II. He was an educated Oba, adequately experienced in the system of governance and reigned from 1942 to 1974. He is the father of his royal highness Prince Ademola Olugbade Aderele; who served Nigeria as Ambassador Extraordinary and Plenipotentiary of the Federal Republic of Nigeria on various missions, including representing the Nigerian Government as its first Nigerian High Commissioner to Thailand.

== See also ==
- Ondo Kingdom
