= Federal College of Agriculture, Akure =

Collage in Ondo State, Nigeria

Location
- Akure; Nigeria, Ondo State
- Coordinates: 7.264778°N 5.231311°E

Information
- Established: January 1957
- Founder: Government of the western Nigeria

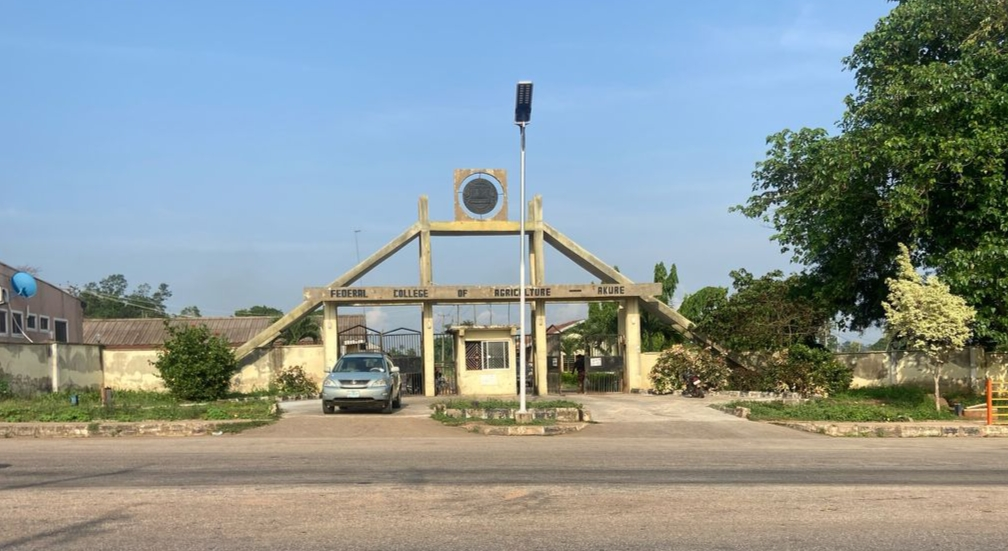
Federal College of Agriculture, Akure

Federal College of Agriculture, Akure (formerly School of Agriculture) is a Federal government owned tertiary institution located in Akure, the capital city of Ondo State in South Western Nigeria. The institution was established in January 1957 by the then government of the western Nigeria to develop the agricultural sector by training certified Agricultural assistant including middle level manpower who will help address the agricultural gap in the state and in the country by extension. After 2-year training programme, students were well equipped to organize labour plantation as well as assist researchers to manage areas and collect data as field assistant in the extension system, they were jobs, graduands need no venture into self employment to earn a decent living. At this time the school has been accredited by the National Board of Technical Education (NBTE) to award National Diplomas (ND) and Higher National Diplomas in Agricultural related courses.

== Partnership with Switzerland ==
The college is part of few Nigerian institutions partnering with the Swiss government in a capacity building project known as Capacity Building for Agricultural Education in Nigeria (CBAEN).

== Possible Upgrade to University of Agriculture ==
In 2021, a bill to upgrade the college to a full-fledged degree awarding Federal University of Agriculture was proposed and read before the floor of the National Assembly of Nigeria.
