= Ondo City =

Second largest town in Ondo State, Nigeria

Ondo Ode Ondo
- City
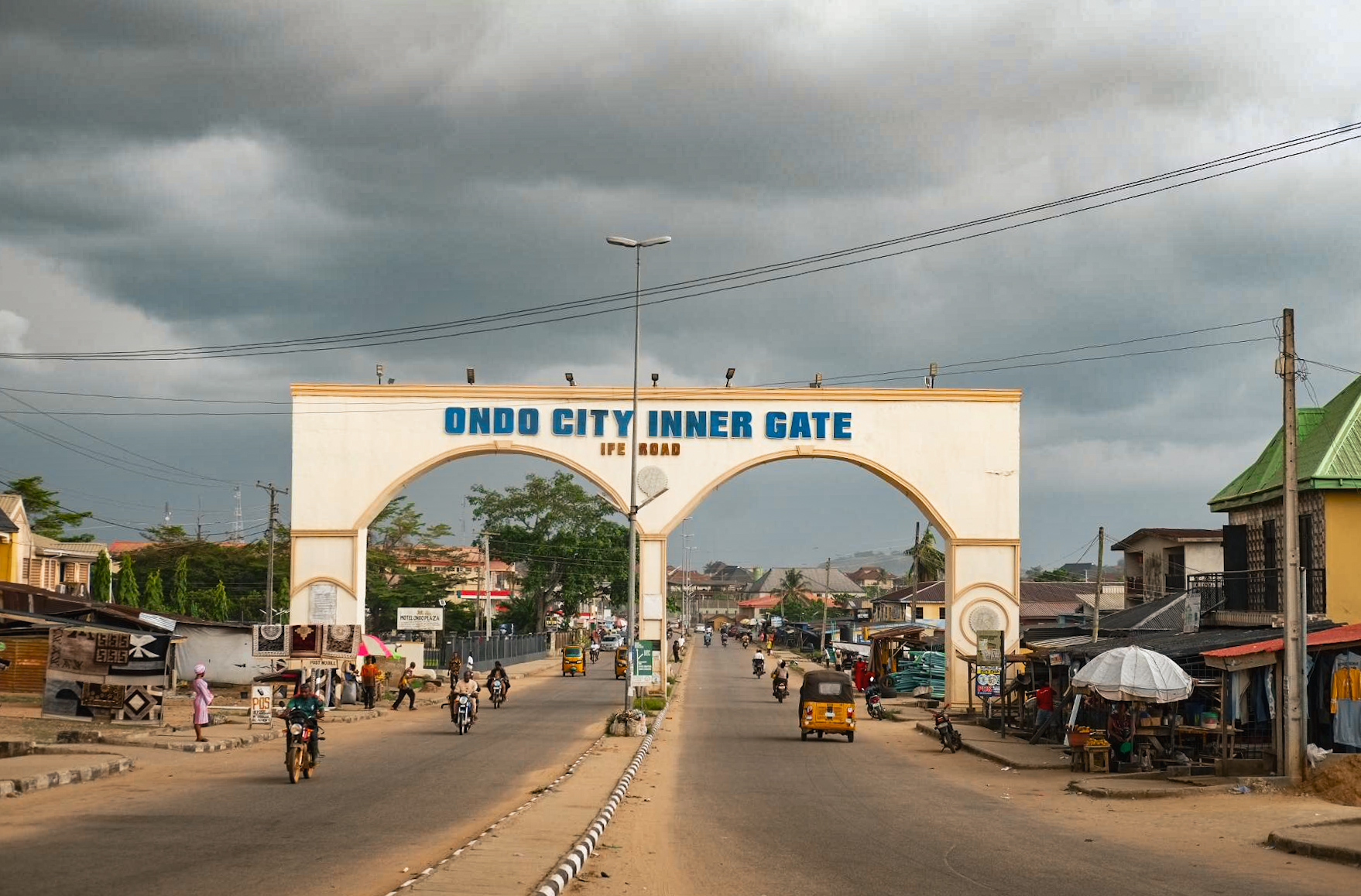
- Ondo town inner gate
- Nickname: Ekimogun
- Ondo shown within Nigeria
- Coordinates: 7.088923°N 4.7990935°E
- Country: Nigeria
- State: Ondo State
- LGAs: Ondo East; Ondo West

Government
  - Oba: Adesimbo Victor Kiladejo

Population (2006)
  - Total: 258,430
  - Ethnicities: Ondo
  - Religions: Christianity Ìṣẹ̀ṣe Islam
- Time zone: UTC+1 (WAT)
- Climate: Aw
- National language: Yoruba
- Website: ondostate.gov.ng

Ondo Town is the second largest city in Ondo State, Nigeria. Ondo Town is the trade center for the surrounding region; commercial crops such as yams, cassava, grain, tobacco and cotton are grown, the latter of which is often used to weave a culturally significant cloth known as Aso Oke fabric, which is commonly used to make clothing amongst the local population. Ondo Town is the largest producer of cocoa products in the region.

The title of the king of the town, who reigns as a direct descendant of the fabled Emperor Oduduwa, is "Osemawe". Osamawe title originated from an unusual situation as reported by Nigerian Punch that when the favoured wife of the first monarch had a set of twins, the king was embarrassed because it was then an abomination. He was so bewildered by the birth of the twins that he exclaimed, ‘Ese omo re’ (meaning these children are an abomination). It is said that this exclamation has through linguistic evolution changed into ‘Osemawe’, which is the title of the monarch of Ondo today. The present reigning monarch is Dr. Adesimbo Victor Kiladejo, who was crowned in September 2006 following the death of the former king, Dr. Festus Ibidapo Adesanoye.

A short introductory expose of Ondo town in Ondo dialect by a native speaker

== Education institutions ==
- Ondo State University of Medical Sciences is a university of medical sciences owned by the Ondo State Government, established in 2015. It is the third specialized university in Africa, and Nigeria's first specialized medical university to be accredited by the National Universities Commission.
- National Institute for Educational Planning and Administration, NIEPA Ondo was established in 1992 by the Federal Ministry of Education, in collaboration with UNESCO/IIEP Paris, as a sub-regional staff college for West Africa. It seek to realize its mission through capacity building, continuous training, consulting, action research in educational planning, information dissemination and providing resource centre services.
- Wesley University is a private university owned by the Methodist Church of Nigeria.
- Adeyemi Federal University of Education is a federal government higher education institution located in Ondo Town, Ondo State, Nigeria. It is a degree-awarding institution affiliated to Obafemi Awolowo University, and is ranked as the best college of education.
- Ondo City Polytechnic is a privately funded and managed polytechnic located in Ondo Town, Ondo state, Nigeria.

The polytechnic was founded in 2017

- John Bosco Institute of Technology, Ondo City
- Adeyemi College of Education, Demonstration Secondary School.
- Homaj international secondary school. Ondo Boys' High School, founded in 1919, is one of Africa's 50 oldest schools. These are a few out of over 200 public and private schools in the town.

== Climate ==
Climate data for Ondo (1991–2020)
Month	Jan	Feb	Mar	Apr	May	Jun	Jul	Aug	Sep	Oct	Nov	Dec	Year
Record high °C (°F)	38 (100)	39.1 (102.4)	39 (102)	38 (100)	35.5 (95.9)	35 (95)	36 (97)	32 (90)	33 (91)	34 (93)	35.5 (95.9)	36.5 (97.7)	39.1 (102.4)
Mean daily maximum °C (°F)	33.0 (91.4)	34.2 (93.6)	33.6 (92.5)	32.1 (89.8)	31.2 (88.2)	29.8 (85.6)	28.3 (82.9)	27.7 (81.9)	28.9 (84.0)	30.3 (86.5)	32.2 (90.0)	33.0 (91.4)	31.2 (88.2)
Daily mean °C (°F)	27.5 (81.5)	28.7 (83.7)	28.7 (83.7)	27.7 (81.9)	27.1 (80.8)	26.1 (79.0)	25.2 (77.4)	24.7 (76.5)	25.4 (77.7)	26.3 (79.3)	27.6 (81.7)	27.7 (81.9)	26.9 (80.4)
Mean daily minimum °C (°F)	22.0 (71.6)	23.2 (73.8)	23.7 (74.7)	23.4 (74.1)	23.0 (73.4)	22.3 (72.1)	22.0 (71.6)	21.8 (71.2)	22.0 (71.6)	22.2 (72.0)	23.1 (73.6)	22.4 (72.3)	22.6 (72.7)
Record low °C (°F)	12 (54)	16 (61)	18 (64)	17 (63)	18 (64)	19 (66)	19 (66)	18.5 (65.3)	19 (66)	19 (66)	19 (66)	15 (59)	12.0 (53.6)
Average precipitation mm (inches)	11.2 (0.44)	38.0 (1.50)	87.8 (3.46)	147.6 (5.81)	179.3 (7.06)	268.0 (10.55)	258.0 (10.16)	188.0 (7.40)	293.0 (11.54)	183.6 (7.23)	54.9 (2.16)	8.3 (0.33)	1,717.8 (67.63)
Average precipitation days (≥ 1.0 mm)	1.1	3.0	7.0	9.3	11.8	15.3	16.0	14.9	18.0	15.0	4.1	0.6	116.1
Average relative humidity (%)	75.9	80.7	86.8	89.9	91.2	91.9	91.5	90.7	91.5	91.2	86.8	78.8	87.2
Source: NOAA

== Notable people ==
- Brigadier Samuel Ademulegun, the first Brigadier of the Nigerian Army. He was killed in the 1966 Nigerian coup d'état. His statue stands at the Ife Roundabout, overlooking Brigadier Ademulegun Road, named after him, in Ondo Town
- King Sunny Adé, also known as King of Juju music; Nigerian musician, singer-songwriter, multi-instrumentalist, and a pioneer of modern world music; been classed as one of the most influential musicians of all time
- Adewale Akinnuoye-Agbaje (born 1967), British actor and former fashion model; born in Islington, London to Nigerian parents of Yoruba, Ondo Town origin; he is fluent in several languages including Yoruba, Italian, and Swahili
- Chinwe Chukwuogo-Roy MBE (born 1952), royal portrait painter; born in Ondo Town; in 2001 she painted the official portrait of Queen Elizabeth II for her Golden Jubilee
- Mo Abudu, Nigerian media mogul, media personality, philanthropist, and former human resources management consultant.
- Omotola Jalade Ekeinde, actress, singer, philanthropist and former model of Ondo Town descent from Lagos; since her Nollywood film debut in 1995, she was honoured in Time magazine's list of the 100 most influential people in the world alongside Michelle Obama, Beyoncé and Catherine, Duchess of Cambridge
- Frederick Fasehun (born 1938), medical doctor, hotel owner, and leader of the Oodua Peoples Congress (OPC); born in Ondo Town
- Gani Fawehinmi, SAN, activist and philanthropist
- Olu Maintain, born Olumide Edwards Adegbulu; rose to prominence in 2007 with the release of the hit song "Yahooze" from his debut studio album Yahooze, the song won the Nigeria Entertainment Award in 2008 for Hottest Single of the Year; in 2008, he performed "Yahooze" at the Royal Albert Hall, London and brought on stage Colin Powell, the former United States Secretary of State
- Olusegun Mimiko, former Governor of Ondo State; former Nigerian minister of housing and urban development
- Godfrey Oboabona (born 1990), international footballer, as a defender; born in Ondo
- Ifedayo Oladapo, OON, NNOM (1932-2010), academic and professor of civil engineering at the University of Lagos
- Archbishop Timothy Olufosoye (c. 1907–1992) was the first African Primate of the Church of Nigeria
- Wale (born 1984), American rapper of Maybach Music Group; born Olubowale Victor Akintimehin in Northwest, Washington, D.C.; his parents are of the Yoruba Ondo Town ethnic group of south-western Nigeria and came to the US from Austria in 1979
- Bimbo Oshin, Nollywood thespian
- Yemi Blaq, Nollywood actor
- Teniola Apata, musician
- Niniola, musician
