= University of Medical Sciences, Ondo =

Public university in Ondo, Nigeria

Coordinates: 7.07749°N 4.80804°E

University of Medical Sciences
- Other names: UNIMED
- Motto: For Learning and Community Services
- Type: public
- Established: March 2015
- Accreditation: National Universities Commission
- Chancellor: Adesimbo Victor Kiladejo
- Vice-Chancellor: Professor Ebunoluwa Aderonke Adejuyigbe, a professor of Pediatrics
- Location: Ondo City, Ondo State, Nigeria
- Website: https://unimed.edu.ng/

University of Medical Sciences, Ondo (UNIMED) is a university of medical sciences in Ondo City, Nigeria, owned by the Ondo State Government, established in 2015. It is the third specialized medical university in Africa and Nigeria's first specialized medical university to be accredited by the National Universities Commission.

The current Vice Chancellor of the University of Medical Sciences Ondo is Professor Ebunoluwa Aderonke Adejuyigbe, a professor of Pediatrics,. The pioneer vice chancellor of the university is Professor Friday Okonofua, a Nigerian professor of gynecology and the founder of Women Health and Action Research Centre, a non-profit and charitable organization headquartered in Benin City, which focuses on promoting female reproductive research.

== History ==
The establishment of the university was a result of the bill signed into law in 2014 by Olusegun Mimiko, the executive governor of Ondo State, to establish a state university of medical sciences. The bill was proposed by the Ondo State House of Assembly under Schedule 1, Section 5(2), and Article 39(1) of Ondo State Laws. The university's first substantive Chancellor, Professor Friday Okonofua, was appointed on March 11, 2015, following the approval of the university by the National University Commission, NUC. The current Vice-chancellor of the university is Professor Adesegun Fatusi.

== Faculties ==
- Science
- Basic medical science
- Basic Clinical Science
- Clinical Science
- Dental science
- Nursing Science
- Allied Health Science
- Medical Rehabilitation

== List of available academic programmes/courses ==
SCIENCES

(1.) Microbiology

(2.) Chemistry

(3.) Mathematics and Computer Science

(4.) Physics

(5.) Food Science

(6.) Science Laboratory Technology

(7.) Bioscience and Biotechnology

BASIC MEDICAL SCIENCES

(1.) Anatomy

(2.) Biochemistry

(3.) Physiology

BASIC CLINICAL SCIENCES

(1.) Anatomic Pathology

(2.) Chemical Pathology

(3.) Haematology

(4.) Microbial Pathology

(5.) Pharmacology and Therapeutics

CLINICAL SCIENCES

(1.) Community Medicine

(2.) Internal Medicine

(3.) Obstetrics and Gynecology

(4.) Paediatrics & Child Health

(5.) Radiology

(6.) Surgery

DENTAL SCIENCES

(1.) Child Dental Health

(2.) Oral and Maxillofacial Surgery

(3.) Oral/ Maxillofacial Pathology, Radiology and Oral Medicine

(4.) Preventive & Community Dentistry

(5.) Restorative Dentistry

NURSING SCIENCES

(1.) Adult and Mental Health Psychiatric Nursing

(2.) Community Health Nursing

(3.) Maternal, Neonatal and Child Health Nursing

(4.) Nursing Education and Administration

(5.) IPNME

ALLIED HEALTH SCIENCES

(1.) Medical Laboratory Science

(2.) Human Nutrition and Dietetics

(3.) Radiography and Radiation Science

(4.) Health Information Management

MEDICAL REHABILITATION

(1.) Physiotherapy

(2.) Occupational Therapy

(3.) Prosthetics and Orthotics

(4.) Audiology and Speech Therapy

== Institutes ==
- Institute of Community Health Innovation And Development

== See also ==
- List of tertiary institutions in Ondo State
