= Wesley University =

Private university in Ondo State, Nigeria

Coordinates: 7.11502°N 4.80755°E

- Motto: Knowledge and Character for Development
- Type: Private
- Established: 2007
- Chancellor: Paul Enenche
- Vice-Chancellor: Samuel Sunday Obeka
- Location: Ondo, Ondo State, Nigeria
- Website: www.wesleyuni.edu.ng

Wesley University, formerly known as Wesley University of Science and Technology (WUSTO), is a private Christian University located in Ondo City, Ondo State, Nigeria. It was established in 2007 by the Methodist Church Nigeria and is licensed by the National Universities Commission (NUC) to operate as a degree-awarding institution.

== History ==
Wesley University was founded by the Methodist Church Nigeria as part of its commitment to education, research, and nation-building. It received its provisional license from the National Universities Commission (NUC) in 2007 and commenced academic activities in May 2008.

The university was initially conceived as a technology-driven institution to provide education that integrates faith, ethics, entrepreneurship, and academic excellence.

== College of Natural and Applied Sciences (CNAS) ==
Departments: Biochemistry, Microbiology, Industrial Chemistry, Industrial Mathematics, Computer Science, Physics with Electronics, Geology & Mining, and Geophysics.

== College Of Health Science ==
Departments: Nursing Science, Medical Laboratory Science, Community Health sciences and Public Health

== College of Agriculture, Food Science & Technology (CAFST) ==
Departments: Crop Science, Animal Science, Food Science & Technology and Nutrition & Diabetics

== College of Arts ==
Departments: Theology, English & literature studies and Theatre arts
