= Ondo Kingdom =

West African traditional state

Oǹdó
Total population
- ~ 1,044,400 (2011)

Regions with significant populations
- Ondo Kingdom - 1,044,400 · Ondo East: 88,410 · Ondo West: 335,620 · Ile Oluji-Oke igbo: 199,690 · Odigbo: 269,880 · Idanre: 150,800

Religion
- Christianity • Islam • Yoruba religion

Related ethnic groups
- Ìkálẹ̀, Èkìtì, Ifẹ, Other Yoruba people

Ondo Kingdom
- c.1510–current
- Capital: Ode Ondo
- Common languages: Yorùbá (Ondo dialect)
- Government: Monarchy
- Historical era: 1510
  - Founding of the Ondo Kingdom: 1510 c.1510
  - Extension of British power over Ondo Kingdom: current current
  - 1900: 1875

The Ondo Kingdom is a Yoruba traditional state that traces its origins back for over 500 years, with its capital in Ode Ondo. Ondo Kingdom was established by Princess Pupupu, one of the twins of Alafin Oluaso. Her mother was Queen Olu who later died at Ile oluji. There were wars in the town between 1865 and 1885 when people in the kingdom fled to Oke Opa. Three Osemawes were installed and died there. Before then the kingdom was ruled by the son of Pupupu called Airo.

As Osemawe his brothers and sisters settled at Odi Lotu Omooba at Oke Otunba headed by one of the princes called Olotu Omooba. The current Lotu omooba is Folajomi Akinmurele Assisted by five princes led by Lisagbon Dr. Adefolayele Akinrolabu The two ranking princes are to be in charge of 2 traditional Ondo festivals called Obaliyen and Agemo festivals. The kingdom survived during and after the colonial period, but with a largely symbolic role Osemawe rules through 6 leading High Chiefs namely. Lisa, Jomo, Odunwo, sasere, adaja and Odofin.The system of governance is like a military oligarchy. The present ruler of the Kingdom is Oba Adesimbo Victor Kiladejo JILO III, the 44th Osemawe, or traditional ruler.

== Political foundations ==
There are three different origin stories of the Ondo kingdom. Firstly, the tradition of Ondo town which is highly celebrated to this day claims that Ondo was founded by a wife of Oduduwa, the progenitor of the Yoruba in Ile-Ife. Oduduwa's wife, Pupupu, gave birth to twins, which were regarded as unlucky and resulted in her exile with her twins. She moved southward until she came to the current location of Ile-Oluji. Pupupu became the first ruler of the Ondo Kingdom in the 16th century and her descendants wear the crown today. Historian Samuel Johnson accounts a similar story but that Pupupu was the wife of Ajaka, the grandson of Oduduwa.

A military coup removed Pupupu in power and appointed her son, Aiho (or Airo in some versions) as the ruler. Aiho established the basic political structure for the Ondo state linked largely to his royal lineage and built the royal palace The royal lineage revolves largely around four different houses, each founded by one of Aiho's sons (although one house died out because of a lack of male heirs). From these different lineages, an Osemawe, or primary monarch for the Ondo kingdom, is selected. The current Osemawe is Oba (Dr.) Victor Adesimbo Ademefun Kiladejo and in 2010 the Kingdom celebrated its 500th anniversary.

== Colonial period ==
The Ondo Kingdom retained independence from other regional powers until the 19th century when pressure from expanded European contact and crisis in Yorubaland caused political crisis. With the expansion of the Atlantic slave trade and large-scale population displacement in Yorubaland, the political life of the Ondo Kingdom changed. Prior to the 19th century, Ondo was unusual in the region for their council system and or the relatively open land tenure principles. The council system rotated leadership amongst houses and there was some significant political status given to women, who had their own council which consulted with the men's council (a role disputed by others). The Ondo land tenure principle was that all land was property of the king, but that any man could farm it as long as he obtained permission from the leader of the nearest community. However, with increasing pressure related to population movement in Yorubaland and increasing relevance of the slave trade, much of this changed. Political and economic power changed from hereditary lineage and access to land holdings to be focused primarily on slaveholdings. The result was large-scale conflict in the Ondo Kingdom from 1845 until 1872, a period with rapid regime change, wars with other regional powers, significant violence, and change of the capital city three times. During this period, worship of Orisha spread widely, leading to human sacrifice (often of slaves) in order to try to end the disorder.

When Christian missionaries started to enter Yorubaland in the latter half of the 19th century, Ondo was a large, forest-based kingdom. However, missionaries largely focused on the other areas in and around Yorubaland rather than Ondo. This may have been because some missionaries thought that the Ondo were socially lower than other Yoruba tribes, perhaps because their custom of concubinage was unacceptable in the Christian tradition. However, in 1870, John Hawley Glover, the administrator of the British Lagos Colony, began focusing efforts on the kingdom of Ondo, largely to create alternative trade routes to Lagos. In 1872, Glover helped negotiate a peace treaty between Ondo and Ife who had been hostile for a number of years, which allowed expanded trade between Lagos and Ondo. Missionary operations began in 1875 throughout the Ondo Kingdom.

The Osemawe of Ondo made an agreement on 20 February 1889 with the governor of the British Lagos Colony by which free trade was guaranteed between Ondo and the colony, and disputes would be referred to an arbitrator appointed by the governor for resolution. In 1899 an order in council was issued to extend the Lagos protectorate over Yoruba land, making Ondo formally subject to the British crown.

== Ondo Kingdom in Nigeria ==
The kingdom survived under colonial rule and subsequent independence, and the coronation of the 44th Osemawe, Oba Victor Adesimbo Ademefun Kiladejo, on 29 December 2008 was a major event, attended by many dignitaries. During the political turmoil of Nigeria in the early 1980s, Ondo was the site of large scale political violence and members of the royal lineage were killed.
