= Adeyemi College of Education =

Public educational institution in Ondo City, Nigeria

Adeyemi Federal University of Education, Ondo City.
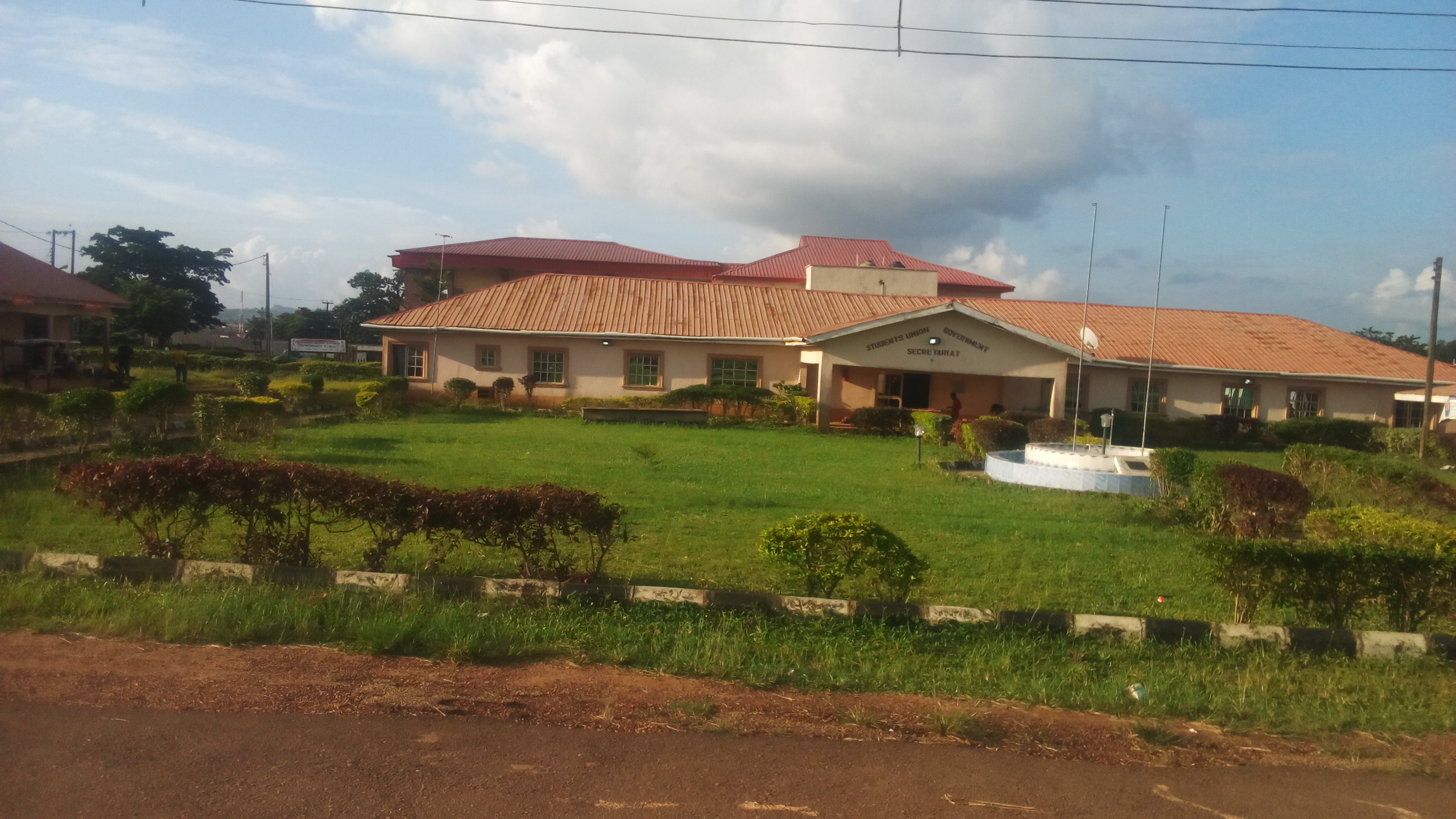
- Former names: Adeyemi College of Education, Ondo City.
- Motto: Education for Service
- Type: Public
- Established: 1964
- Affiliations: Obafemi Awolowo University
- Location: Ondo, Ondo State, Nigeria
- Campus: Urban
- Colours: Green
- Nickname: AFUED
- Website: University website

The Adeyemi Federal University of Education is a federal government higher education institution located in Ondo City, Ondo State, Nigeria. Formerly Adeyemi College of Education, Adeyemi Federal University of Education was named after Canon M. C. Adeyemi (one of the earliest educationists in Yorubaland) in recognition of his immense contribution to educational development in the then Ondo Province.

It was established in 1963 to produce qualified teachers to teach in secondary schools and teachers' training colleges and to conduct research and experiments on methods of teaching at all levels of education in Nigeria. It formally commenced operations on 22 May 1964 with 93 students, 24 women and 69 men, and has metamorphosed into a first class College of Education in Nigeria and in the West Africa sub-region. Presently, it has five schools – Arts and Social Sciences, Education, Languages, Sciences, and Vocational and Technical Education – with a total of 28 academic departments.

The college was a combination of the various institutions that sprang up in the sixties to cater to the development of Manpower in secondary schools and teacher training colleges in the Western region. Teachers college (up to 1963), The Ransome Kuti College of Education, The Olunloyo College of Education and Ohio Teachers Project, Ondo all constituted the solid foundation on which it was built. See for instance, Adeyemi Federal University of Education now boast of 9 Hostels in total which comprises 6 Female hostels and 3 Male hostels.

== Schools/Faculties ==
The institution offers various programmes under the following Schools/Faculties:

1. Education
2. Sciences
3. Arts and Social Sciences
4. Languages
5. Vocational and Technical Education

The institution also runs the SIWES programme that enables students to gain practical experience while attached to workplaces.

== Status ==
The federal government of Nigeria under the Goodluck Jonathan presidency upgraded the College to a full-fledged university of education in May 2015. However, the new administration of former President Mohammed Buhari decided to put the new status on hold in August 2015 because of the absence of an enabling law. The National Assembly finally passed the Adeyemi Federal University Establishment bill in December 2018 and the bill was assented by the former President of the Federal Republic of Nigeria Mohammed Buhari in December 2021.

== Notable alumni ==
- Anikeade Funke-Treasure, journalist, trainer, mentor, coach, event compere, and author

== See also ==
- List of colleges of education in Nigeria
