= Western State (Nigeria) =

Former state of Nigeria

The former Western State of Nigeria was formed in 1967 when the Western Region was subdivided into the states of Lagos and Western State. Its capital was Ibadan, which was the capital of the older region. The largest ethnic group there were the Yoruba who constituted 75% of the regional population before the Mid-Western region was excised from it in 1963, and over 95% of the regional population after its Benin and Warri provinces were carved out.

In 1976, the state was further subdivided into three new states, Ogun, Ondo and Oyo. The older Western region now consists of Eleven states, across three geopolitical zones: Bayelsa: (Ekeremor and Sagbama LGAs), Delta, Edo, Ekiti, Kwara, Lagos, Ogun, Ondo, Osun, Oyo State, as well as the Ndoni districts of Rivers state, which was a part of the Aboh division.

Oyo State is the largest state by area in the South West. It covers an area of 28,454km2.

Lagos State is the most populated state with over 20 million people residing therein.

== See also ==
- Yoruba country
