= Nigerian National Assembly delegation from Ondo =

Ondo's delegation in Nigeria's National Assembly

The Nigerian National Assembly delegation from Ondo comprises three Senators representing Ondo North, Ondo South, Ondo Central and eight Representatives Akoko South East/South West, Irele/Okitipupa, Ile-Oluji Okeigbo/Odigbo, Akoko North East/north West, Idanre/Ifedore, Ondo East/ West, Akure North /South, and Owo/Ose.

== Fourth Republic ==
=== 9th Assembly (2019–2023) ===
Senator	Constituency	Party
Robert Ajayi Boroffice	Ondo North	APC
Akinyelure Patrick Ayo	Ondo Central	PDP
Nicholas Tofowomo	Ondo South	PDP

=== 8th Assembly (2015–2019) ===
Senator	Constituency	Party
Robert Ajayi Boroffice	Ondo North	APC
Tayo Alasoadura	Ondo Central	APC
Yele Omogunwa	Ondo South	PDP

=== 7th Assembly (2011–2015) ===
Senator	Constituency	Party
Robert Ajayi Boroffice	Ondo North	LP
Akinyelure Patrick Ayo	Ondo Central	LP
Boluwaji Kunlere	Ondo South	LP

=== 6th Assembly (2007–2011) ===
Senator	Constituency	Party
Bode Olajumoke	Ondo North	PDP
Gbenga Ogunniya	Ondo Central	PDP
Hosea Ehinlanwo	Ondo South	PDP
Representative	Constituency	Party
Abiodun Aderin Adesida	Akure North/South	PDP
Adedeji Omotayo Emmanuel	Ileoluji-Okeibo/Odigbo	PDP
Ajayi Agboola	Eseodo/Ilaje	PDP
Alaba Ojomo	Owo/Ose	PDP
Gbenga Elegbeleye	Akoko North East/West	PDP
Niyi J. Akinyugha	Idanre/Ifedore	PDP
Oladoyinbo-Ojomo Alaba	Owo/Ose	PDP
Olakunde Oluwole	Okitipupa/Irele	PDP
Ologunagba J. Debo	Akoko South East/South West	Labour Party (LP)
Tayo Fawehinmi	Ondo East/Ondo East	PDP

=== 5th Assembly (2007–2011) ===
Senator	Constituency	Party
Titus Olupitan	Ondo North	AD
Gbenga Ogunniya	Ondo Central	PDP
Hosea Ehinlanwo	Ondo South	PDP

N (AD)

=== 4th Assembly (1999–2003) ===
Senator	Party	Constituency
Lawrence Ayo	AD	Ondo North
Omololu Meroyi	AD	Ondo South
Gbenga Ogunniya	AD	Ondo Central
Representative	Party	Constituency
Orimoloye Peter Saka	AD	Akoko South East/South West
Abayomi Sheba	PDP	Irele/Okitipupa
Janet Febisola Adeyemi	AD	Ile-Oluji Okeigbo/Odigbo
Dada Busari	AD	Akoko North East/north West
Fagbite Lawrence Akinyele	AD	Idanre/Ifedore
Oladejo Akinnifesi	AD	Ondo East/ West
Omoseebi Rufus Akinwumi	AD	Akure North /South
Omotosho Michael	AD	Owo/Ose
