= Igbekele Ajibefun =

Nigerian academic and politician (born 1964)

Ondo State Commissioner for Education, Science and Technology
- Incumbent
- Assumed office July 2025
- Governor: Lucky Aiyedatiwa

Vice-Chancellor of Adekunle Ajasin University
- In office January 2015 – January 2020
- Preceded by: Femi Mimiko
- Succeeded by: Olugbenga Ige

Rector of Rufus Giwa Polytechnic
- In office November 2010 – January 2015
- Preceded by: Peter Fapetu
- Succeeded by: Boniface Ologunagba

Personal details
- Born: Igbekele Amos Ajibefun; 28 July 1964 (age 61) Irele, Western Region, Nigeria (now in Ondo State, Nigeria)
- Profession: Educational administrator; academic; agricultural economist; researcher

Igbekele Amos Ajibefun (born 28 July 1964) is a Nigerian professor of agricultural economics who has served as the commissioner for education, science and technology in Ondo State since July 2025. He previously served as the vice-chancellor of Adekunle Ajasin University, Akungba-Akoko from 2015 to 2020, and as the rector of Rufus Giwa Polytechnic, Owo from 2010 to 2015.

== Early life ==
Ajibefun was born in Irele, local government area of Ondo State, southwestern Nigeria on 28 July 1964. He had his secondary education at United Grammar School, Ode-Irele in Ondo State, where he obtained the west African School Certificate in the year 1983 before he proceeded to the Federal University of Technology Akure where he received a bachelor's degree in Farm Management and Extension in 1990.

He later attended the University of Ibadan where he obtained a master's degree in Agricultural economics in the year 1992 before he returned to his alma mater where he was awarded a doctorate (Ph.D.) degree in Agricultural economics.

== Career ==
He joined the services of Federal University of Technology, Akure in the year 1993 as assistant lecturer and was appointed as a professor on 1 October 2009.

In November 2010, he was appointed Rector of Rufus Giwa Polytechnic. He held this position until he was appointed as Vice chancellor of Adekunle Ajasin University, to succeed professor Nahzeem Olufemi Mimiko whose tenure elapsed in January 2015.

== Membership ==
- Member, European Society for Soil Conservation (ESSC)
- International Association for Agricultural Economists (IAAE)
- African Economic Research Consortium (AERC) Network
- Asian Society of Agricultural Economists (ASAE)
- Nigerian Economic Society
- Nigerian Participatory Rural Appraisal Network (NIPRANET) and Conference of Heads of Polytechnics in Nigeria.
