= 2011 Nigerian Senate elections in Ondo State =

2011 Nigerian Senate election in Ondo State

The 2011 Nigerian Senate election in Ondo State was held on April 9, 2011, to elect members of the Nigerian Senate to represent Ondo State. Robert Ajayi Boroffice representing Ondo North, Akinyelure Patrick Ayo representing Ondo Central and Kunle Boluwaji representing Ondo South all won on the platform of Labour Party.

== Overview ==
Affiliation	Party		Total
Affiliation	LP	PDP	Total
Before Election			3
After Election	3	–	3

== Summary ==
District	Incumbent	Party	Elected Senator	Party
Ondo North			Robert Ajayi Boroffice	LP
Ondo Central			Akinyelure Patrick Ayo	LP
Ondo South			Kunle Boluwaji	LP

== Results ==
=== Ondo North ===
Labour Party candidate Robert Ajayi Boroffice won the election, defeating other party candidates.

2011 Nigerian Senate election in Ondo State
Party	Candidate	Votes	%
LP	Robert Ajayi Boroffice		
Total votes			
LP hold			

=== Ondo Central ===
Labour Party candidate Akinyelure Patrick Ayo won the election, defeating other party candidates.

2011 Nigerian Senate election in Ondo State
Party	Candidate	Votes	%
LP	Akinyelure Patrick Ayo		
Total votes			
LP hold			

=== Ondo South ===
Labour Party candidate Kunle Boluwaji won the election, defeating party candidates.

2011 Nigerian Senate election in Ondo State
Party	Candidate	Votes	%
LP	Kunle Boluwaji		
Total votes			
LP hold			
