= 1999 Nigerian Senate elections in Ondo State =

1999 Nigerian Senate election in Ondo State

The 1999 Nigerian Senate election in Ondo State was held on February 20, 1999, to elect members of the Nigerian Senate to represent Ondo State. Lawrence Ayo representing Ondo North, Gbenga Ogunniya representing Ondo Central and Omololu Meroyi representing Ondo South all won on the platform of the Alliance for Democracy.

== Overview ==
Affiliation	Party		Total
Affiliation	PDP	AD	Total
Before Election			3
After Election	0	3	3

== Summary ==
District	Incumbent	Party	Elected Senator	Party
Ondo North			Lawrence Ayo	AD
Ondo Central			Gbenga Ogunniya	AD
Ondo South			Omololu Meroyi	AD

== Results ==
=== Ondo North ===
The election was won by Lawrence Ayo of the Alliance for Democracy.

1999 Nigerian Senate election in Ondo State
Party	Candidate	Votes	%
AD	Lawrence Ayo		
Total votes			
AD hold			

=== Ondo Central ===
The election was won by Gbenga Ogunniya of the Alliance for Democracy.

1999 Nigerian Senate election in Ondo State
Party	Candidate	Votes	%
AD	Gbenga Ogunniya		
Total votes			
AD hold			

=== Ondo South ===
The election was won by Omololu Meroyi of the Alliance for Democracy.

1999 Nigerian Senate election in Ondo State
Party	Candidate	Votes	%
AD	Omololu Meroyi		
Total votes			
AD hold			
