= 2015 Nigerian Senate elections in Ondo State =

2015 Nigerian Senate election in Ondo State

The 2015 Nigerian Senate election in Ondo State was held on March 28, 2015, to elect members of the Nigerian Senate to represent Ondo State. Omotayo Donald representing Ondo Central and Robert Ajayi Boroffice representing Ondo North won on the platform of All Progressives Congress, while Yele Omogunwa representing Ondo South won on the platform of Peoples Democratic Party.

== Overview ==
Affiliation	Party		Total
Affiliation	APC	PDP	Total
Before Election			3
After Election	2	1	3

== Summary ==
District	Incumbent	Party	Elected Senator	Party
Ondo Central			Omotayo Donald	APC
Ondo North			Robert Ajayi Boroffice	APC
Ondo South			Yele Omogunwa	PDP

== Results ==
=== Ondo Central ===
All Progressives Congress candidate Omotayo Donald won the election, defeating People's Democratic Party candidate Akinyelure Ayo and other party candidates.

2015 Nigerian Senate election in Ondo State
Party	Candidate	Votes	%
APC	Omotayo Donald		
PDP	Akinyelure Ayo		
Total votes			
APC hold			

=== Ondo North ===
All Progressives Congress candidate Robert Ajayi Boroffice won the election, defeating People's Democratic Party candidate Bode Olajumoke and other party candidates.

2015 Nigerian Senate election in Ondo State
Party	Candidate	Votes	%
APC	Robert Ajayi Boroffice		
PDP	Bode Olajumoke		
Total votes			
APC hold			

=== Ondo South ===
Peoples Democratic Party candidate Yele Omogunwa won the election, defeating All Progressives Congress candidate Morayo Lebi and other party candidates.

2015 Nigerian Senate election in Ondo State
Party	Candidate	Votes	%
PDP	Yele Omogunwa		
APC	Morayo Lebi		
Total votes			
PDP hold			
