= 2007 Nigerian Senate elections in Ondo State =

2007 Nigerian Senate election in Ondo State

The 2007 Nigerian Senate election in Ondo State was held on 21 April 2007, to elect members of the Nigerian Senate to represent Ondo State. Gbenga Ogunniya representing Ondo Central, Bode Olajumoke representing Ondo North and Hosea Ehinlanwo representing Ondo South all won on the platform of the Peoples Democratic Party.

== Overview ==
Affiliation	Party		Total
Affiliation	PDP	ACN	Total
Before Election			3
After Election	3	0	3

== Summary ==
District	Incumbent	Party	Elected Senator	Party
Ondo Central			Gbenga Ogunniya	PDP
Ondo North			Bode Olajumoke	PDP
Ondo South			Hosea Ehinlanwo	PDP

== Results ==
=== Ondo Central ===
The election was won by Gbenga Ogunniya of the Peoples Democratic Party.

2007 Nigerian Senate election in Ondo State
Party	Candidate	Votes	%
PDP	Gbenga Ogunniya		
Total votes			
PDP hold			

=== Ondo North ===
The election was won by Bode Olajumoke of the Peoples Democratic Party.

2007 Nigerian Senate election in Ondo State
Party	Candidate	Votes	%
PDP	Bode Olajumoke		
Total votes			
PDP hold			

=== Ondo South ===
The election was won by Hosea Ehinlanwo of the Peoples Democratic Party.

2007 Nigerian Senate election in Ondo State
Party	Candidate	Votes	%
PDP	Hosea Ehinlanwo		
Total votes			
PDP hold			
