= Anthonia =

Anthonia is a Swedish, Danish, and Finnish feminine given name that is a form of Antonia that is used in Finland, Denmark, Sweden, Republic of Karelia, Estonia and Greenland.

Notable individuals with the name include:

- Anthonia Fatunsin, Nigerian archeologist
- Anthonia Kleinhoonte (1887–1960), Dutch botanist and experimentalist
