= Gbenga =

Gbénga
- Gender: Male
- Language: Yoruba

Origin
- Origin: Nigeria
- Meaning: Lift me up
- Region of origin: South-West Nigeria

Other names
- Variant form: Gbemiga

Gbénga audio is a first name or surname among the Yoruba speaking tribe of Nigeria. It means lift me up or lift higher. It can also be translated to mean Elevate.

== Notable people with this name ==
=== Given name ===
- Gbenga Adeboye (1959–2003), Nigerian entertainer
- Gbenga Adeyinka, Nigerian comedian
- Gbenga Agbenugba (pseudonym of Ola Opesan, born 1966), Nigerian-British writer, journalist and educationist
- Gbenga Akinnagbe (born 1978), American actor
- Gbenga Aluko (born 1963), Nigerian politician
- Gbenga Arokoyo (born 1992), Nigerian footballer
- Gbenga Bareehu Ashafa (born 1955), Nigerian politician
- Gbenga Daniel (born 1956), Nigerian politician
- Gbenga Tai "Ben" Folami (born 1999), Australian footballer
- Gbenga Elegbeleye (born 1964), Nigerian sports administrator and politician
- Gbenga Ogunniya (born 1949), Nigerian politician
- Gbenga Toyosi Olawepo (born 1965), Nigerian activist
- Gbenga Oloukun (born 1983), Nigerian boxer
- Gbenga Omotoso (born 1961), Nigerian journalist, writer and columnist
- Gbenga Salu, Nigerian video producer
- Gbenga Sesan (born 1977), Nigerian businessman
- Gbenga Shobo (born 1963), Nigerian businessman
