= Tinuade Babalola =

Nigerian monarch

- Reign: 23 February 2015 – 16 December 2021
- Coronation: 2015
- Predecessor: Adele I
- Born: Tinuade Babalola; 25 May 1998 (age 28); Iboropa Akoko, Ondo State, Nigeria
Names
- Tinuade Babalola Adejuyigbe
- Father: Oba Emmanuel Ayowole Adejuyigbe

Tinuade Babalola Adejuyigbe Adele I (born 25 May 1998) of Iboropa Akoko, also known as Akokoland, Ondo State, Nigeria, is the first female traditional ruler/monarch of the Iboropa-Akoko kingdom. Tinuade was made a regent king to oversee the Akokoland as a community head on 23 February 2015, which was not long after her father, Oba Emmanuel Ayowole Adejuyigbe, died on 10 February 2015 at the age of 57. She was made the Adele (Yoruba for regent) at the age of 16. According to an interview published in the Tribune Newspaper she said that she went through a few customary rites of passage before she was declared the regent and she administered till 16 December 2021. Additionally, she was a freshman when the process of being a female regent started. She was the first sitting monarch to attend the National Youth Service Corps (NYSC) camp without being noticed, in Minna, Niger State, Nigeria.

== Education ==
Tinuade received a B.Sc in public administration from Adekunle Ajasin University, Ondo State, Nigeria.

== Selection and coronation ==
After Tinuade's father, Oba Emmanuel Bablola, died, Tinuade was made the female regent king to oversee the Akokoland as a community leader on 23 February at the age of 16, according to the customs of the Akokoland. During this time she was an undergraduate in pursuit of a degree in Public Administration from Adekunle Ajasin University, Ondo State, Nigeria.

== Personal life ==
Tinuade Babalola Adejuyigbe is the first female traditional ruler and community head of Iboropa-Akoko, Ondo State, Nigeria. Apart from being a king, she is a business woman who makes Asooke, beads, crowns, iruleke and other indigenous items, cultural attires, and heads the Green Women Initiative (GWI). She is single and her tradition permits her to remain celibate while on the throne.

== Green Women Initiative ==
Green Women Initiative is a non-governmental organisation with the aim to provide advantages for women in agriculture and agro-allied, launched on 25 May 2021 in celebration of her 23rd birthday.
