= 2003 Nigerian Senate elections in Ondo State =

2003 Nigerian Senate election in Ondo State

The 2003 Nigerian Senate election in Ondo State was held on April 12, 2003, to elect members of the Nigerian Senate to represent Ondo State. Gbenga Ogunniya representing Ondo Central and Hosea Ehinlanwo representing Ondo South won on the platform of Peoples Democratic Party, while Titus Olupitan representing Ondo North won on the platform of the Alliance for Democracy.

== Overview ==
Affiliation	Party		Total
Affiliation	PDP	AD	Total
Before Election			3
After Election	2	1	3

== Summary ==
District	Incumbent	Party	Elected Senator	Party
Ondo Central			Gbenga Ogunniya	PDP
Ondo South			Hosea Ehinlanwo	PDP
Ondo North			Titus Olupitan	AD

== Results ==
=== Ondo Central ===
The election was won by Gbenga Ogunniya of the Peoples Democratic Party.

2003 Nigerian Senate election in Ondo State
Party	Candidate	Votes	%
PDP	Gbenga Ogunniya		
Total votes			
PDP hold			

=== Ondo South ===
The election was won by Hosea Ehinlanwo of the Peoples Democratic Party.

2003 Nigerian Senate election in Ondo State
Party	Candidate	Votes	%
PDP	Hosea Ehinlanwo		
Total votes			
PDP hold			

=== Ondo North ===
The election was won by Titus Olupitan of the Alliance for Democracy.

2003 Nigerian Senate election in Ondo State
Party	Candidate	Votes	%
AD	Titus Olupitan		
Total votes			
AD hold			
