= Akungba =

Akungba Akoko
- Town
- Interactive map of Akungba Akoko
- Coordinates: 7°28′30.871″N 5°44′9.546″E
- Country: Nigeria
- State: Ondo

Akungba is a town in Ondo State located in southwestern Nigeria. The town is situated close to Ikare-Akoko. The people of Akungba had occupied their current abode about a century ago, and were under the control of Owo before the entire Akoko land of Ondo State united. The town was not popular and scarcely populated before the advent of Adekunle Ajasin University, formally Ondo State University in the year 1999.

The ruling monarch of Akungba is HRM Oba Oseni Isiaka Adu (Agure I).

== Climate ==
It is rarely sunny in July and August, due to the wet season.
