= Yele Omogunwa =

Nigerian politician (born 1950)

Senator
- In office May 2015 – May 2019
- Preceded by: Boluwaji Kunlere
- Succeeded by: Nicholas Tofowomo
- Constituency: Ondo South

Personal details
- Born: May 22, 1950 (age 75)
- Party: All Progressives Congress
- Profession: Politician

Yele Omogunwa (born may 22 1950) is a Nigerian Politician and was the Senator representing Ondo South Senatorial District of Ondo State at the 8th National Assembly. He was defeated in the 2019 senatorial election by Nicholas Tofowomo of the People's Democratic Party (PDP) for the Ondo south senatorial seat
