= Bode Olajumoke =

Nigerian politician

National Senator
- In office May 2007 – May 2011
- Preceded by: Lawrence Ayo
- Succeeded by: Robert Ajayi Boroffice
- Constituency: Ondo North

Personal details
- Born: 1 July 1944 (age 82)
- Party: People's Democratic Party (PDP)
- Profession: Civil servant, Politician

Wilfred Olabode Olajumoke (Bode Olajumoke) is a Nigerian politician who was a member of the Senate of Nigeria for Ondo State from 2007 to 2011.

== Background ==
Bode Olajumoke was born in Lagos on 1 July 1944, of a Yoruba family from Imeri in Ondo State. He obtained an LL.M (Moscow), and a Ph.D (Law) at the University Edinburgh, presenting the thesis "Legal aspects of the forms of international co-operation between the Soviet Union and African States" and a BL (Lagos). He worked as a trainee reporter with the Daily Times of Nigeria from 1963 to 1964. After obtaining his law degrees, he worked with the Federal Ministry of Establishment from 1974 to 1979. After further legal studies he joined the Ministry of Defence in 1980. He retired from the civil service as a GL 15 officer in 1987.

In 2003, speaking as chairman of RORO Oceanic, Dr. Bode Olajumoke criticized the nation's maritime policies and high tariffs, and supported privatization of the Nigerian Ports Authority (NPA).

Bode Olajumoke is chairman of MITOSATH (Mission to save the helpless), a non – governmental charity organization with the primary mission of improving the health of the less privileged.

== Political career ==
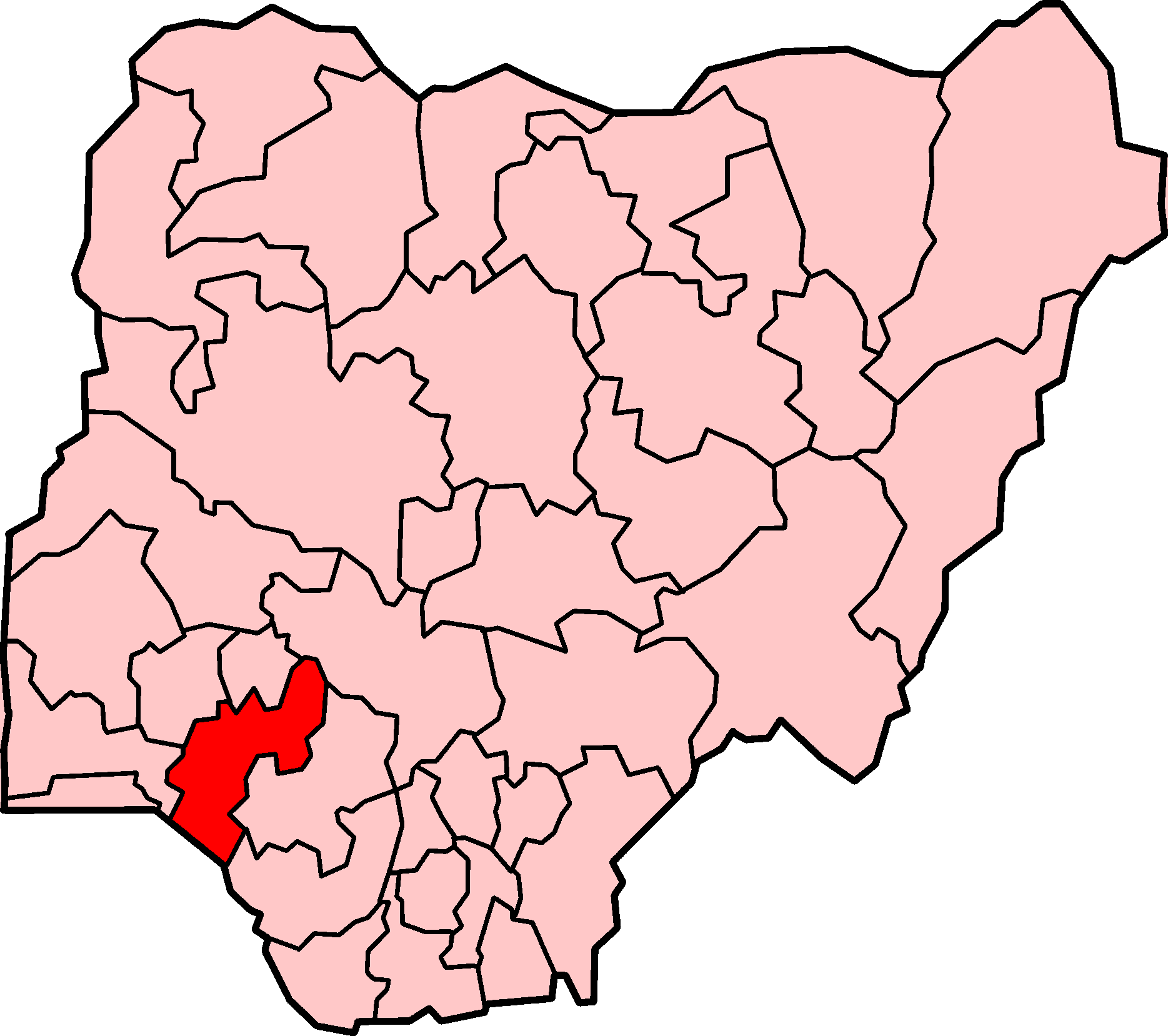
Ondo State in Nigeria

In 1999, Bode Olajumoke was an aspirant to the presidency.

He is a chieftain and a member of the Peoples Democratic Party PDP Board of Trustees. Running as a People's Democratic Party (PDP) candidate, Bode Olajumoke was elected as senator in the 5th (2003–2007) National Assembly representing Ondo North Senatorial District, and was reelected in 2007 for a further four-year term. Senator Olajumoke is a member of senate committees on Navy, National Planning, Foreign Affairs, Employment, Labour & Productivity, Downstream Petroleum and Defence & Army.

In August 2008, Bode Olajumoke accompanied Senator Ike Ekweremadu in the Nigerian delegation to the United States to observe the 2008 Democratic National Convention.

In November 2008, Olajumoke stated that Nigeria was not yet ready for full democracy, and spoke in favour of a "benevolent dictatorship".

Responding to this statement, the Majority Leader of House of Representatives, Hon. Tunde Akogun, said that for democracy to really survive in Nigeria, there must be some mark of dictatorship in decisions to be taken, but stressed that Olajumoke could not have meant a call for a truly dictatorial form of government.

Speaking in June 2009 as chairman of the Senate Committee on Navy, Senator Olajumoke defended the actions of the military Joint Task Force (JTF) in the Niger Delta, saying it is fighting militancy and criminality that negate the economic interest of the nation. He conceded that a political solution is needed to address the problems of the area.
