= Femi Mimiko =

Nigerian academic (born 1960)

Vice Chancellor of Adekunle Ajasin University
- In office 4 January 2010 – 4 January 2015
- Preceded by: Philip Olayede Abiodun
- Succeeded by: Igbekele Ajibefun

Personal details
- Born: Nahzeem Olufemi Mimiko; 1 May 1960 (age 66) Ondo, Western Region, British Nigeria (now in Ondo State, Nigeria)
- Relations: Olusegun Mimiko (brother)

Nahzeem Olufemi "Femi" Mimiko (born 1 May 1960) is a Nigerian educational administrator and former vice chancellor of Adekunle Ajasin University, a state-owned university named after the former governor of Ondo State, Nigeria, Adekunle Ajasin. The university was ranked the best state university in Nigeria by the United States Transparency International Standard (USTIS) in April 2014. Mimiko was the only vice chancellor delegate at the National Conference in Nigeria held in 2014 under the administration of President Goodluck Jonathan. Mimiko assumed office in January 2010 and was preceded by Philip Olayede Abiodun. In 2016, he had a stint as African and African-American Studies Associate, at Harvard University, Cambridge, MA, USA.

== Education ==
Mimiko was born in Ondo State, Nigeria. He attended Ondo Anglican Grammar School in 1973 and St. Joseph's College from 1973 to 1977. He obtained a B.Sc. (Political Science) and M.Sc. (International Relations) from Obafemi Awolowo University in Ile Ife, Nigeria. His areas of research interest are comparative political economy, development and transition studies and international relations.

== Academic career ==
Mimiko has been described as an "erudite scholar" and is the author of several books. He wrote The Global Village, The Korean Economic Phenomenon and Crisis and Contradictions in Nigeria's Democratization Programme, 1986–1993. He was a panelist at the 2005 University of Texas conference that examined how popular cultures have evolved and contributed to the character of Africa. He is presently a Professor of Political Science at Obafemi Awolowo University, Ile-Ife, Osun State, Nigeria.

== Awards ==
Mimiko received the US Military Academy Army Commander's Public Service Award in June 2004. He was named the Best Security Conscious Vice Chancellor in the country by the International Institute of Professional Security (IIPS) in 2013-2014.

== Personal life ==
Mimiko is the immediate younger brother of Dr. Olusegun Mimiko, a former governor of Ondo State, Nigeria.

== See also ==
- Obafemi Awolowo University
