= Gbenga Elegbeleye =

Nigerian sports administrator

Gbenga Elegbeleye Otolorin
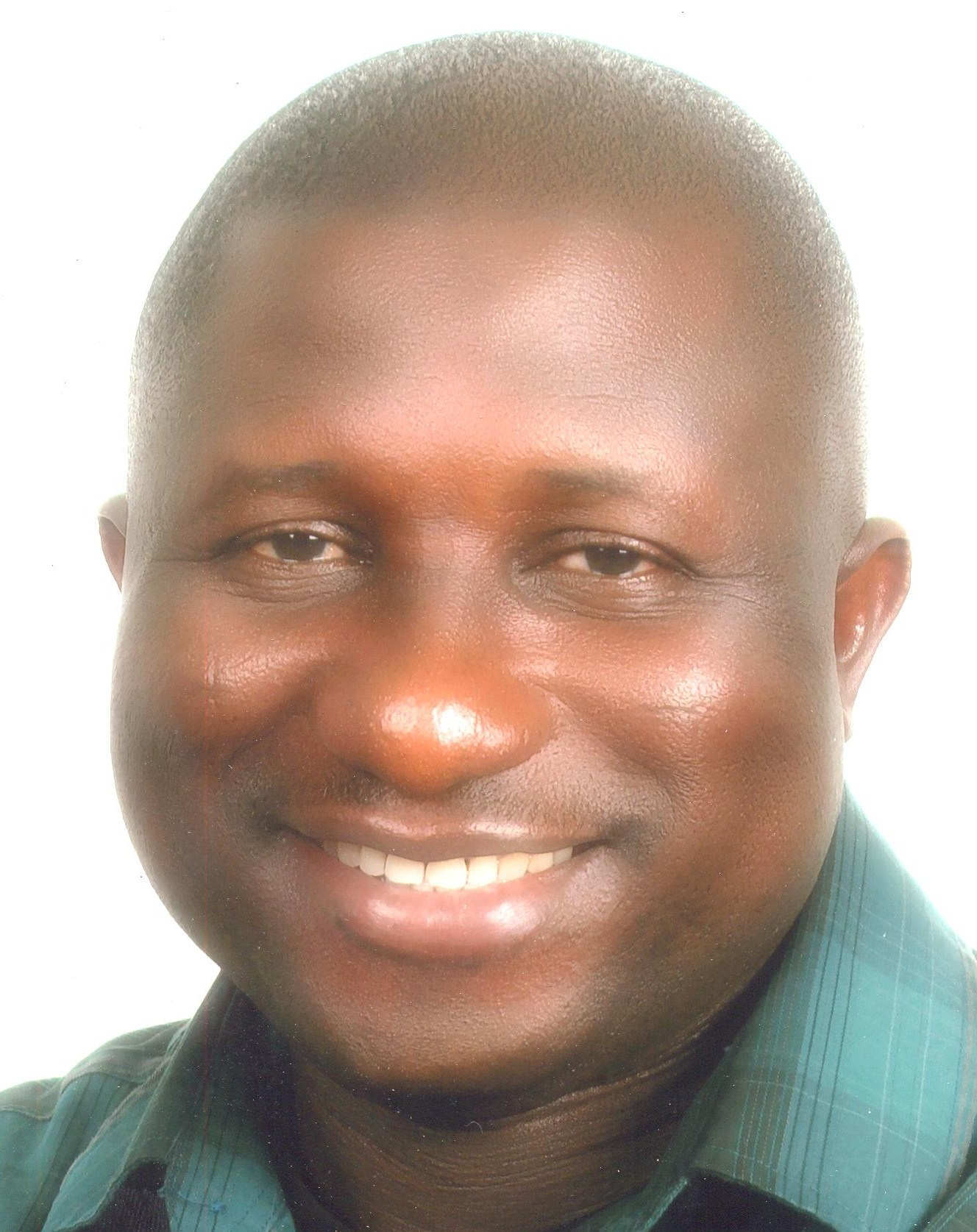

Personal details
- Born: 1 October 1964 (age 61) Ikare, Ondo State, Nigeria.
- Occupation: Sports Administrator, Politician
- Nickname: Oto

Gbenga Elegbeleye (born October 1, 1964) is a Nigerian sports administrator and a politician. Gbenga Elegbeleye is the Director-General of the National Sports Commission in Nigeria. He was a legislator in the House of Representatives (Nigeria).

== Background ==
Gbenga Elegbeleye is a Nigerian from Akoko North-East Local Government Area of Ondo State where he grew up. He had his primary and secondary education in the area and later proceeded to Ile-Ife, Osun State and Ado Ekiti, Ekiti State where he had his tertiary education.

== Education ==
Gbenga Elegbeleye attended Ansar Ud Deen Primary School, Ikare-Akoko (1969–1975) where he obtained his First School Leaving Certificate. He later proceeded to St. Patrick’s Secondary School, Iwaro-Oka, Ondo State (1977–1982) for his West African School Certificate. He earned a Bachelor of Arts from Obafemi Awolowo University, Ile-Ife, Osun State (1983–1988). He followed it up with a Master of Public Administration from the University of Ado Ekiti in 2006. He is a member of several professional bodies, which include:

- Fellow, Chartered Institute of Local Government & Public Administrations
- Fellow, Chartered Institute of Management Account
- Fellow, Certified Institute of Management
- Fellow, the Nigerian Institute of Sales Management

== Political career ==
Gbenga Elegbeleye is a member of People's Democratic Party (Nigeria). He contested and was elected Chairman, Akoko North-East Local Government Council between 1997 and 1998. During the same period (1997–1998), he served as a Member of the Ondo State Primary Education Board (SPEB). He was appointed Chairman, Ondo State Waste Management Authority in 2003, a position he held until 2006. In 2007, Elegbeleye contested for and won a seat at the House of Representatives (Nigeria) where he represented Akoko-North/East/West Federal Constituency. He was one of the members of Nigerian National Assembly delegation from Ondo in the 6th Assembly (2007–2011). He served as the Deputy Chairman of the House of Representatives Committee on Sports during that period. His legislative interests were "Youth Empowerment, Rural Development and Energy Sector Development.". He is a member of various bodies both at the state and federal levels, namely:

- Member, Ministerial Committee on Reform of Football Administration in Nigeria (August–November 2011)
- Chairman, Ondo State Table Tennis Association (2004–2007)
- Vice Chairman, Ondo State Sport Development Committee (2005–2008)
- Chairman, Rising Stars Football Club, Akure (2004–2007)
- President, Youth Sports Federation of Nigeria (YSFON) Ondo State (2002–2010)
- Member Ethics and Fair Play Committee, Nigeria football Association (NFA) (2004–2007)

His appointment as Director-General of National Sports Commission on May 15, 2013, received mixed reviews in Nigeria. He saw the appointment as "a call to duty...but it is a duty for every stakeholder and all Nigerians. We must put in collective efforts to make sure that things go the way they should." While Weekly Trust reported his appointment as a "surprise" because he was not one of "the names of four renowned sports administrators" shortlisted and sent to the Presidency by the Nigeria's Sports Minister, Mallam Bolaji Abdullahi, Soccer Star reported that President of Nigeria Football Federation, Alhaji Aminu Maigari and former Chairman of the Nigeria Premier League, Chief Oyuiki Obaseki supported Elegbeleye to succeed in his then new post. Upon his resumption on Tuesday, May 21, 2013, he said that his focus would be "to reengineer the transformation of the nation’s sports sector from the grassroots."

== Awards and honours ==
- Local Government Chairman of the Year (Ondo State Merit Award Committee) 1998
- Outstanding Legislator of Youths by South West Youth Leaders Association
- The National Association of the Nigerian Students (NANS) Award for Distinguished Leadership Qualities 2005
- Pillar of Sports in Ondo State by the Ondo State Youth Action Group 2009
- Presidential Award by the Rotary Club of Ijapo 2007
- Akoko Top 20 Award by the National Association of Akoko Student (UNAD Chapter) 1998
- Most Articulate Representative of the Year from Ondo State (Legislative Meritorious Award) 2008-2009
- Legend of Awoism (Chief Obafemi Awolowo/Awoist Award) 2008
- Outstanding Performance Award of Honors by the National Association of Gospel Musicians.
- Media Merit Award for Legislative Excellence 2009
- Certificate of Merit by the International Republican Institute, U.S.A.
