= Olugbenga Ige =

Nigerian academic

Vice-Chancellor of Adekunle Ajasin University Akungba
- Incumbent
- Assumed office 2021

Personal details
- Education: University of Benin
- Profession: Academic; Educator; Administrator

Prof Olugbenga Ige is a Nigerian professor of Palynology and Palaeoecology who became the Vice Chancellor of the Adekunle Ajasin University Akungba, Ondo state, Nigeria since July 7, 2021.
