= Omololu Meroyi =

Nigerian politician (1950–2026)

Omololu Samuel Meroyi

Senator for Ondo South
- In office 29 May 1999 – 29 May 2003
- Succeeded by: Hosea Ehinlanwo

Personal details
- Born: 1950 Ondo State, Colony and Protectorate of Nigeria
- Died: 22 July 2026 (aged 76)

Omololu Samuel Meroyi (1950 – 22 July 2026) was a Nigerian politician who was a Senator for the Ondo South constituency of Ondo State, at the start of the Nigerian Fourth Republic, running on the Alliance for Democracy (AD) platform. He took office on 29 May 1999.

== Life and career ==
Meroyi attended the Ijebu Ode Grammar School and the University of Ibadan, where he earned a BSc. in Economics in 1973. He went the London School of Economics where he gained an MSc in Economics in 1977.

He worked with Food Specialities Nigeria (1978–1980), Roro Technical Company (1980–1982) and was chairman of Araromi Rubber Estate (1995–1997).

During the Nigerian Second Republic he was elected into the House of Representatives on the Unity Party of Nigeria (UPN) platform.

Elected to the Senate in 1999 on the AD platform, Meroyi later decamped to the People's Democratic Party (PDP). In December 2002, Meroyi was a contender to become the PDP candidate for Ondo State Governor in the 2003 elections, but lost to the former Minister of Power and Steel, Dr. Olusegun Agagu, winning only seven out of 161 votes. In May 2003, the Senate rejected President Olusegun Obasanjo's veto of the Independent Corrupt Practices and Other Related Offences Commission Act, and passed the bill into law. Meroyi voted against the Senate decision.

After leaving the Senate, Meroyi became a board member of Wema Bank Plc. from January 2004 until his resignation in 2007. In March 2008, the managing director of the bank was arrested by the Special Fraud Unit of the Police in Ikoyi, Lagos concerning a N450 million scam, but was granted bail. Meroyi was alleged to have received a payout of N4 million, and was questioned by the police.

Meroyi left the PDP and became Ondo South Senatorial District Chairman of the Labour Party. In April 2008, he testified at Elections Petitions Tribunal hearings into the April 2007 governorship election in Ondo State, which were marred by irregularities. The tribunal decided that Dr. Olusegun Mimiko of the Labour Party was the elected governor. In 2011, he became a board director of Lagos Airport Hotel. He later resigned his appointment a year later after he rejoined the Peoples Democratic Party (PDP). He was the National Vice Chairman (South-West) Nigerian Senators' Forum.

Meroyi died on 22 July 2026, at the age of 76.
