= Boluwaji Kunlere =

Nigerian politician

Senator for Ondo South
- Incumbent
- Assumed office May 2011
- Preceded by: Hosea Ehinlanwo
- Constituency: Yele Omogunwa

Personal details
- Born: April 1960 (age 65–66) Igbotako Okitipupa LGA, Ondo State
- Party: Labour Party

Boluwaji Kunlere (born April 1960) is a Nigerian politician who was elected Senator for Ondo South, in Ondo State, Nigeria in the April 2011 national elections. He was elected on the Labour Party platform.

Boluwaji Kunlere was born in April 1960 in the Igbotako Okitipupa Local Government area of Ondo state. He read law at Ogun State University and became a barrister. Kunlere became secretary of the People's Democratic Party (PDP) in Ondo state. He ran for election to the Senate for Ondo South in April 2007 on the Labour Party platform, but was defeated by Hosea Ehinlanwo. In March 2009 he was appointed Special Advisor to Governor Olusegun Mimiko on Political Affairs and Legal Matters. In August 2010 he resigned from this position so he could compete for the Ondo South Senatorial District.

Shortly before the April 2011 election, Kunlere said that two buses loaded with thugs had been arrested at Igbotako, Ondo State. He said he had talked to the thugs, and they said they had been invited by an aide of the wealthy politician Jimoh Ibrahim. Ibrahim was a supporter of the PDP's candidate, the former Governor of the state Olusegun Agagu. In the April 2011 election for the Ondo South Senatorial seat, running on the Labour Party platform, Kunlere defeated Agagu with a narrow margin of over 8,000 votes. The PDP challenged the election, claiming that the Independent National Electoral Commission (INEC) officials had shown bias to the Labour Party.

== See also ==
- Tunde Eso
