= Hosea Ehinlanwo =

Nigerian politician

Hosea Oladapo Ehinlanwo

Senator for Ondo South
- In office 29 May 2003 – May 2011
- Preceded by: Omolulu Meroyi
- Succeeded by: Boluwaji Kunlere

Personal details
- Born: 2 August 1938 (age 88) Erunna, Ilaje LGA, Ondo State, Nigeria
- Party: People's Democratic Party (PDP)
- Education: B.A. Hons, MBA, LLB BL

Hosea Oladapo Ehinlanwo (born 2 August 1938) was elected Senator for the Ondo South constituency of Ondo State, Nigeria, taking office on 29 May 2003, and was reelected in 2007. He is a member of the People's Democratic Party (PDP).

== Birth and early career ==
Ehinlanwo was born on 2 August 1938 in Erunna, Ilaje local government of Ondo State.He attended NA Primary School, Ajido, Badagry, Lagos from 1946 to 1953 for his primary education and later went to Colony Teachers College, Ikorodu and Christ Apostolic Church Teachers College, Efon-Alaye for his Secondary/Teacher Training Education. He then went on to acquire a BSC in Business Administration from Thomas A Edison College, Florida, and a Master's in Business administration from the Prestigious University of Ibadan, Nigeria. While he was in the senate, he was honoured with a Doctorate award for his numerous contributions to the development of his people, his community, and his country. Prior to his term in the senate, he had also acquired an LLB degree from the University of Benin, Nigeria, and a BL from the Nigerian Law School – effectively becoming a Barrister of Law of the Federal Republic of Nigeria – an experience that served him well in the senate

Apart from politics, his career activities have included teaching, marketing manager, assistant general manager, university lecturer, personnel / administration manager as well as banker. He was pioneering Lecturer of the then Ogun State University (Now Olabisi Onabanjo University) - in the social sciences faculty (Department of Business Administration) and indeed helped to put the Business Admin department of the University on Solid footing in those early years. He was also the chairman of the now-defunct Ilaje/Ese-Odo Community bank Igbokoda.

His foray into politics started in the 60s when he was a key member and officer of the Local Chapter of the then Action Group. However, he did not seek elective public office until 1977 when he was elected as a part-time local government councillor in the then newly created Ilaje Ese Odo local government (1977–1979).

== Senate election ==
Hosea Oladapo Ehinlanwo was first elected by his people to represent Ondo South in 1998 as Senator in the transition to Civil rule which did not happen under the platform of the then UNCP. Still not done with him, the people of Ondo South decided to re-invest their confidence in him as their senator in 2003 – serving under the platform of the PDP from 2003 – 2007. In 2007, he was re-endorsed to represent the good people of Ondo South for a second term from 2007 to 2011.

In the PDP primaries before the 2007 elections it was alleged that Chief Olusola oke won. However Ehinlanwo claimed that the primaries were massively rigged with the support and connivance of the then Governor of Ondo state, Olusegun Agagu and the selection process became the subject of litigation. Ehinlanwo's name was placed on the ballots. Oke protested but an Abuja High Court refused the protest and upheld Ehinlanwo as the elected PDP candidate. After the election, Oke again appealed and this time was upheld in court, and the question was taken to the Supreme Court for final judgement. The supreme court upheld Ehinlanwo as the duly elected candidate and the supreme court judgement has become a landmark case in the interpretation of the Nigerian electoral act as it pertains to "Substitution of candidates".

== Senate career ==
In the Senate, he chaired the Population and National Identity Card Committee and the Navy Committee. He was also a member of the Ethics, Army, Petroleum (Upstream and Downstream), and Constitutional Reform Committees. Hosea Oladapo Ehinlanwo had a career as a professional and public servant.
