= Adekunle Ajasin University =

Public university in Akungba-Akoko, Nigeria

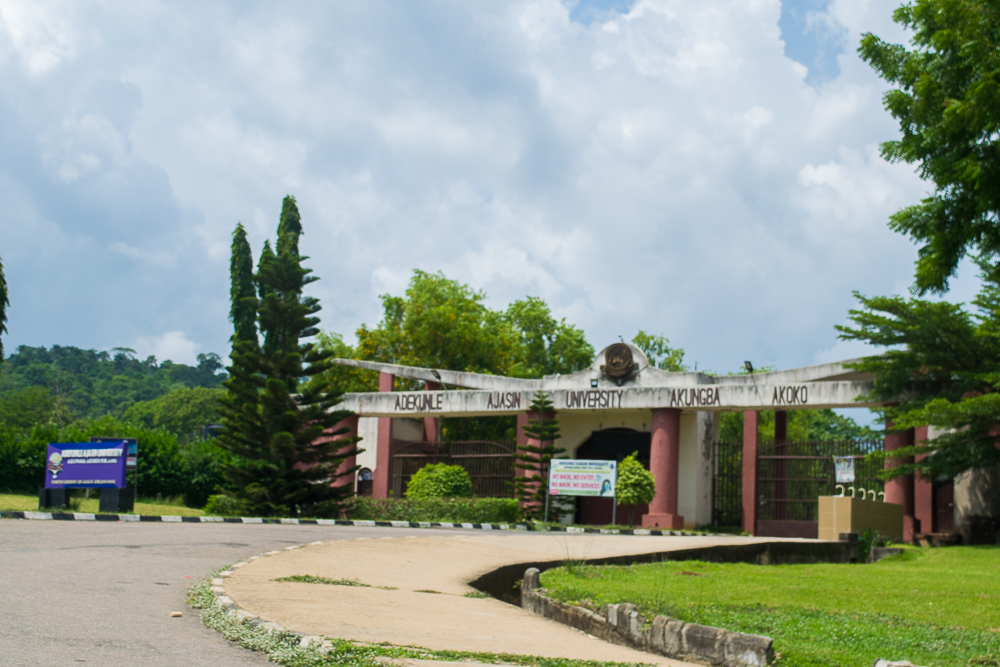
- Former name: Obafemi Awolowo University
- Motto: For Learning and Service
- Type: Public
- Established: December 1999; 26 years ago
- Vice-Chancellor: Tomola M. Obamuyi
- Students: over 27,000
- Location: Akungba-Akoko, Ondo State, Nigeria; 7.479234°N 5.748411°E
- Campus: Urban
- Nickname: AAUA
- Website: University website

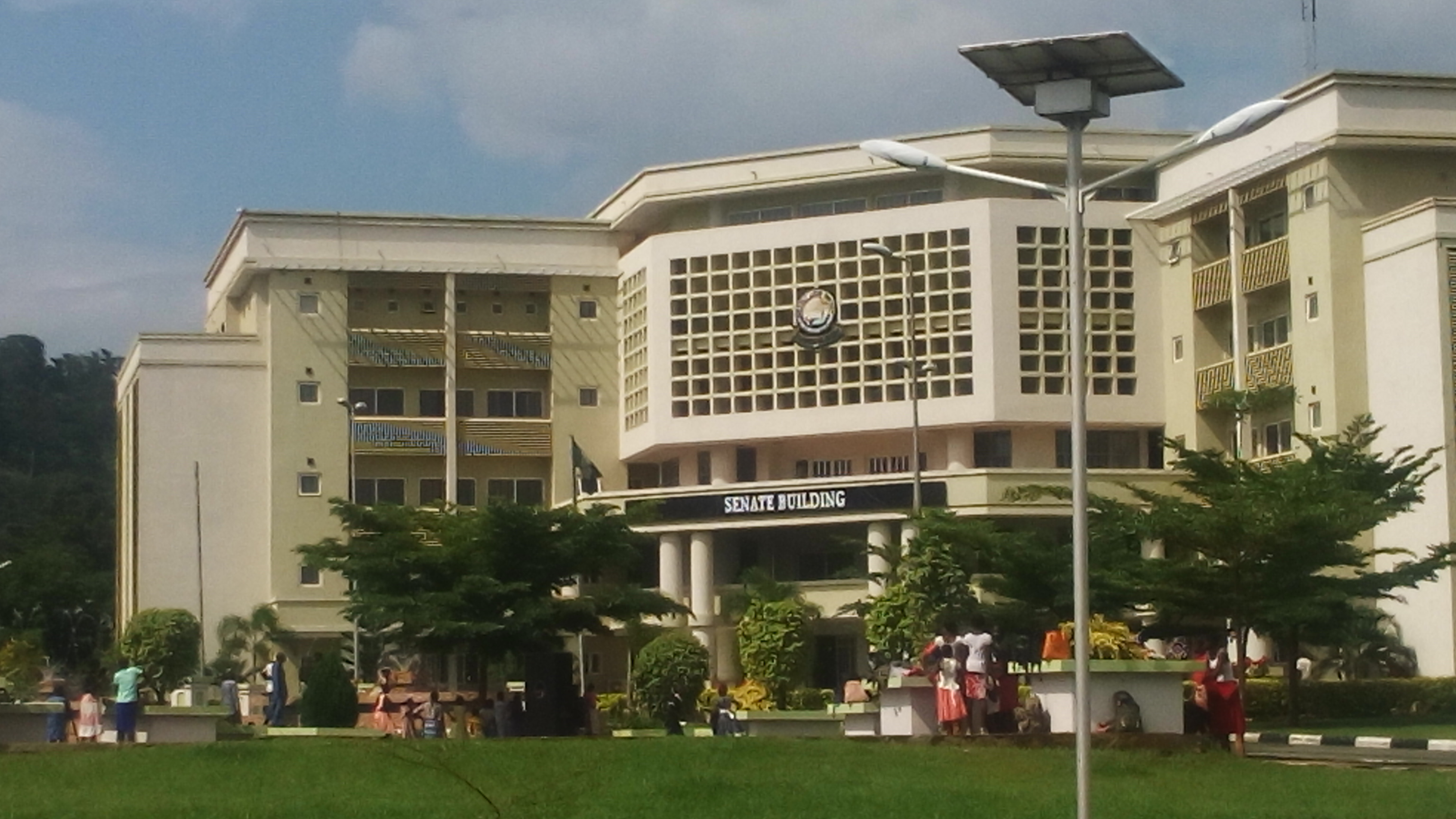
Senate building, Adekunle Ajasin University, Akungba Akoko. Ondo State. 04

Adekunle Ajasin University, Akungba-Akoko (AAUA) is a public university owned and operated by the government of Ondo State, Nigeria. The university is located in Akungba Akoko, Ondo State, Nigeria.

== History ==
Adekunle Ajasin University was established as Obafemi Awolowo University in March 1982 by the government of the old Ondo State, headed by the late Chief Michael Adekunle Ajasin. The immediately succeeding military government of Navy Commodore Michael Bamidele Otiko changed its name to Ondo State University in 1985.

Its relocation to Akungba Akoko in the new Ondo State became imperative in 1999, following the creation of a new state out of the old Ondo three years earlier in October 1996. The bill backing the relocation was signed into law by the then Governor of the State, Chief Adebayo Adefarati, in November 1999, and that prompted the movement of a crop of workers from the old site in Ado-Ekiti to Akungba Akoko on 1 December 1999.

The bill for yet another name change, this time to Adekunle Ajasin University, in order to immortalise the late Governor Ajasin, was signed into law by Governor Adefarati in 2004 following the demise of the former. The amended and subsisting statute of the university was signed into law in November 2007 by yet another governor, the former Governor Olusegun Agagu. In these circumstances, it can rightly be said that while the history of AAUA started in 1982, its relocation on 5 November 1999 marked the beginning of the second phase of its history now in its present location, Akungba Akoko.

== Academics ==
Adekunle Ajasin University offers undergraduate and post-graduate as well as Pre-degree, JUPEB programmes in fields of specialization ranging from Science, Arts, Education, Law, Social Sciences, Management sciences, Agricultural science, Environmental Design and Management.

The university has eight faculties

Below is the list of departments:

- Accounting
- Adult Education
- Architecture
- Arts Education
- Animal and Environmental Biology
- Agricultural Economics and Extension
- Agronomy
- Animal Science
- Banking and Finance
- Biochemistry
- Business Administration
- Chemical Sciences
- Computer Science
- Commercial and Industrial Law
- Criminology and Security Studies
- Science Education
- Economics
- Educational Management
- English Studies
- Earth Sciences
- Estate Management
- Forestry and Wildlife Management
- Fisheries and Aquaculture
- Geography and Planning Science
- Guidance and Counselling
- History and International Studies
- Human Kinetics and Health Education
- Industrial Chemistry
- International Law
- Jurisprudence and International Law
- Linguistics and Languages
- Mathematic Sciences
- Mass Communication
- Microbiology
- Performing Arts
- Philosophy
- Physics and Electronics
- Physical and Health Education
- Plant Science and Biotechnology
- Political Science and Public Administration
- Private and Property Law
- Public Law
- Pure and Applied Psychology
- Quantity Surveying
- Religion and African Culture
- Science Education
- Social Science Education
- Sociology
- Urban and Regional Planning
- Vocational and Technical Education

== Library ==
The institution's library supports teaching, learning and research among the students and staff of the institution. The library has an automated system with availability of e-resources.

== Students' Union ==
The AAUA Students' Union (AAUASU) has a large population of over 27,000 students. The Students' Unionism of Adekunle Ajasin University runs like a Federal system of government; with the Student Union Government (SUG) at the Apex level, the Faculty Executives at the Faculty level and the Departmental Executives at the Departmental level. Each office is held for a single Academic year.

== Sport ==
AAUA's Sports Complex, provides sium, Standard football pitch, Tennis court, and many other sports. AAUA students participate in competitive sports such as the Nigerian University Games Association and West African University's Games.

AAUA also participated in the Higher Institutions Football League (HiFL) 2021 AAUA played at the final of the HiFL against UNIMAID where they won the second-place position.

== Past and Present Vice Chancellors ==
The Vice Chancellors are assisted by two deputy Vice Chancellors, both Academic and Administration.

Names of Vice Chancellors	Date
Prof. Akin Akindoyemi	January 2000 to January 2001
Prof. Olusola Ibukun (Acting)	January 2001 to May 2002
Prof. Funso Akere	4 May 2002 to 30 April 2006
Prof. Femi Mimiko (Acting)	May 2006 to October 2006
Prof. Dr. Med. Philip Abiodun	1 October 2006 to 18 June 2009
Prof. O. Awobuluyi (Acting)	19 June 2009 to 3 January 2010
Prof. Femi Mimiko	4 January 2010 to 4 January 2015
Prof. Igbekele Ajibefun	6 January 2015 to 5 January 2020
Prof. Olugbenga Ige (Acting)	6 January 2020 to 6 July 2021
Prof. Olugbenga Ige	7 July 2021 to 7 July 2026
Prof. Tomola Marshal Obamuyi	8 July 2026 till date

== Principal Officers ==
Names	Position
Lucky Aiyedatiwa, SAN, Executive Governor, Ondo State of Nigeria	Visitor
Dr. Tunji Abayomi	Pro-Chancellor/Chairman, Governing Council
Prof. Tomola Marshal Obamuyi	Vice Chancellor
Dr Grace Olubunmi BABALOLA	Registrar
Mr. Bamidele Abiodun Olukoju FCA	Bursar

== Achievements ==
- During the wave of the #COVID-19 pandemic, Scientists in the university with partners from National Biotechnology Development Agency and Afe Babalola University conducted a research titled "Aframomum melegueta secondary metabolites exhibit polypharmacology against SARS-CoV-2 drug targets: in vitro validation of furin inhibition" which resulted into the findings that Aframomum melegueta shows some potential for treating COVID-19.

The scientists out of which five are professors include: Olaposi Omotuyi, Oyekanmi Nash, Basiru O Ajiboye, Victor O Olumekun, Babatunji E Oyinloye, Oludare T Osuntokun, Adebisi Olonisakin, A Olajide Ajayi, Olasehinde Olusanya, Funmilola S Akomolafe, Niyi Adelakun.

- Akintewe Oluwadamiloa, a student of the university was the only Nigerian that made the top 10 shortlist for the inaugural Global Student Prize 2021 by Chegg and Varkey Foundation.

== Faculties ==
- Faculty of Agriculture
- Faculty of Art

Faculty of Arts Adekunle Ajasin University, Akungba-Akoko (AAUA), Ondo State, Nigeria

The Faculty of Arts at Adekunle Ajasin University, Akungba-Akoko (AAUA) is one of the most distinguished and historic faculties within the institution. Recognized as the oldest academic discipline in academia, it was among the first faculties to take off with the university at its inception. Established in 1999, following the renaming and relocation of the university by the Ondo State Government, the Faculty has remained a cornerstone of intellectual and cultural development.

It was created to advance critical thinking, cultural awareness, ethical scholarship, and humanistic education, and it continues to uphold these ideals through its academic and extracurricular activities.

- Faculty of Education
- Faculty of Environmental Design and Management
- Faculty of Law
- Faculty of Science
- Faculty of Computing
- Faculty of The Social Sciences
- Faculty of Administration and Management Sciences

== Affiliated colleges ==
- College Of Education, Lanlate

== Photo Gallery ==
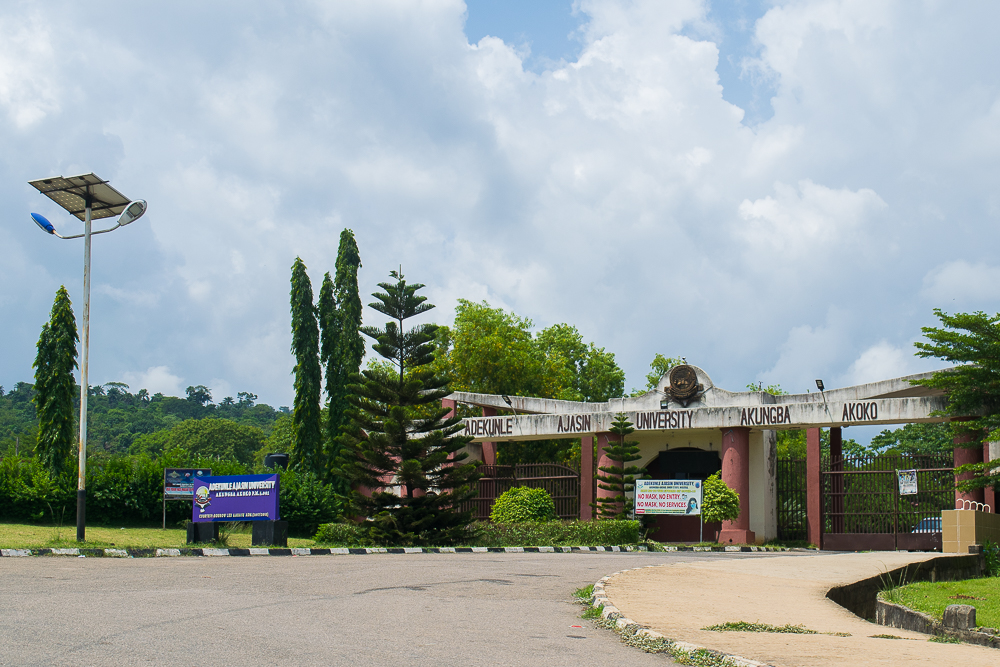
Main Gate

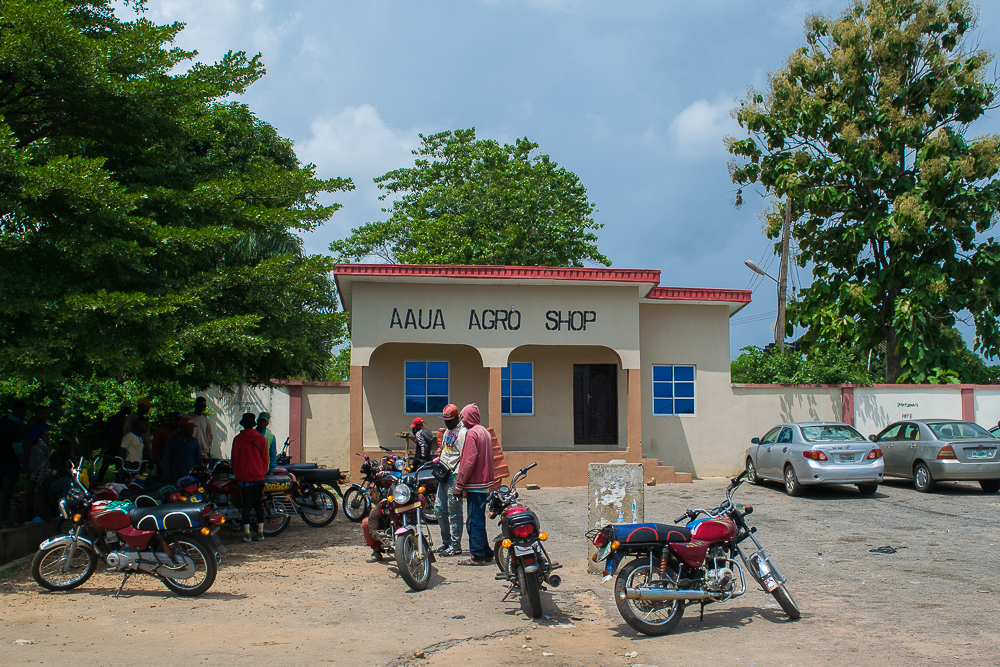
AAUA Agro Shop

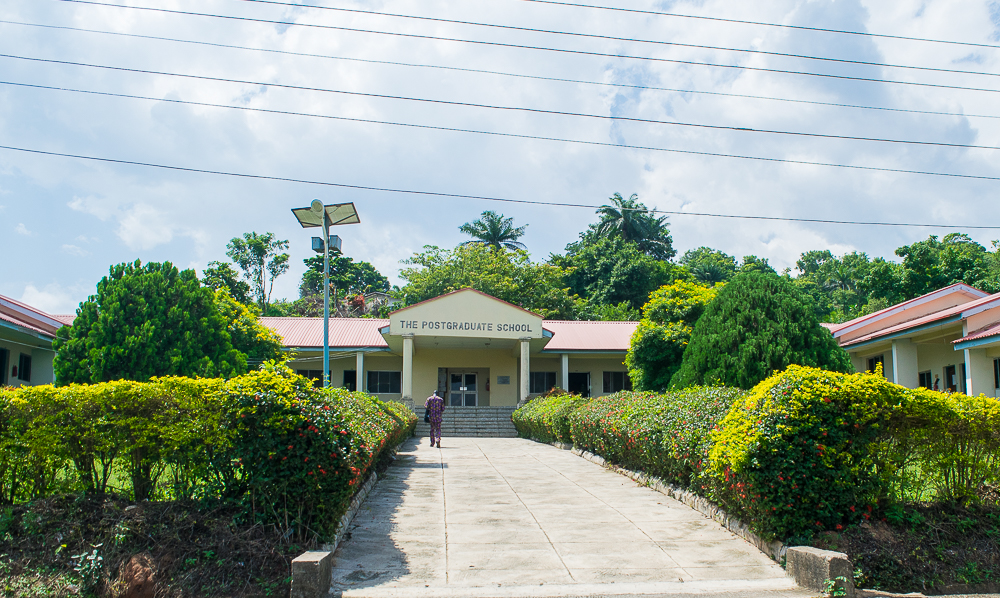
The Postgraduate school

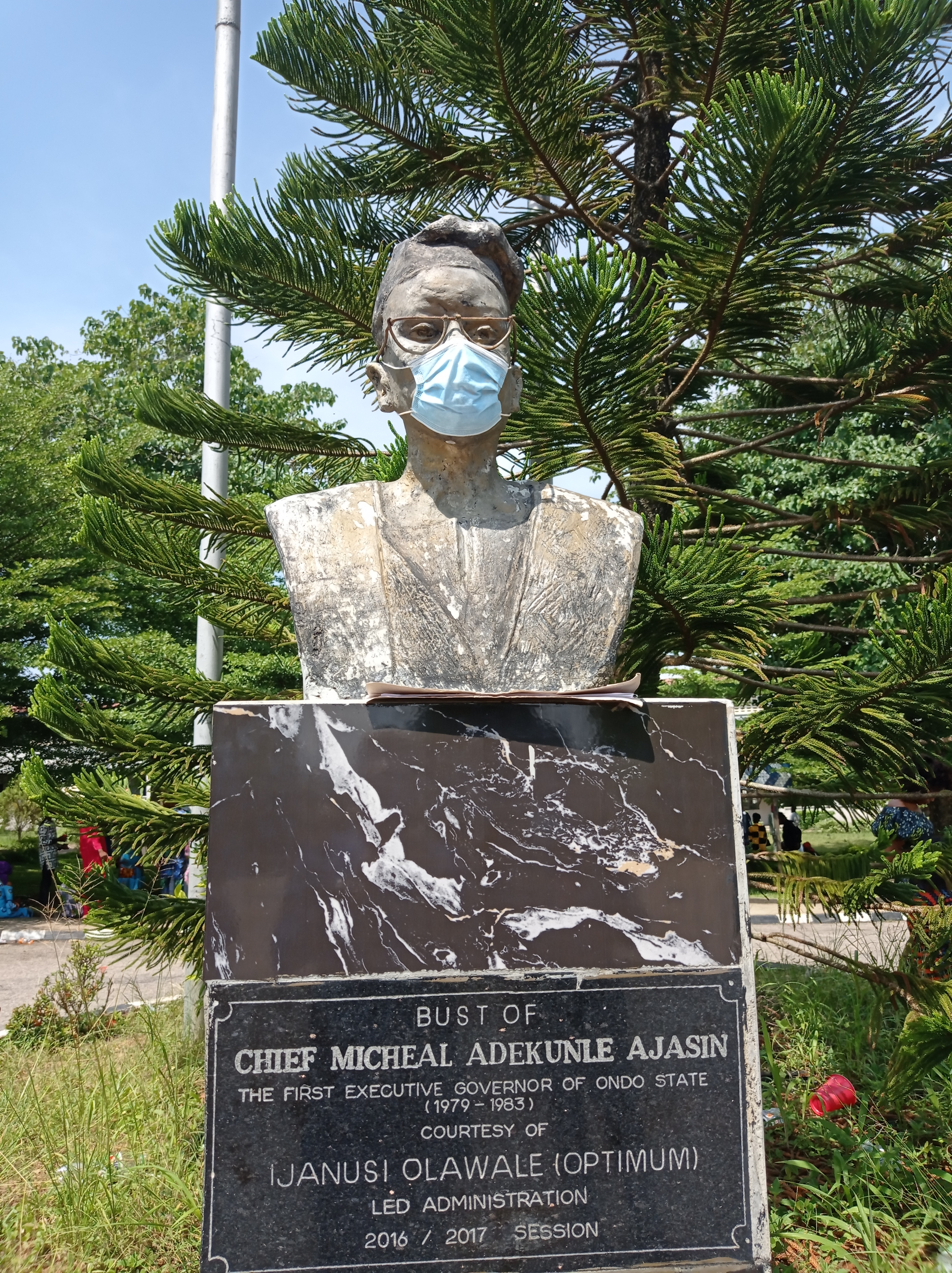
Statue of Adekunle Ajasin

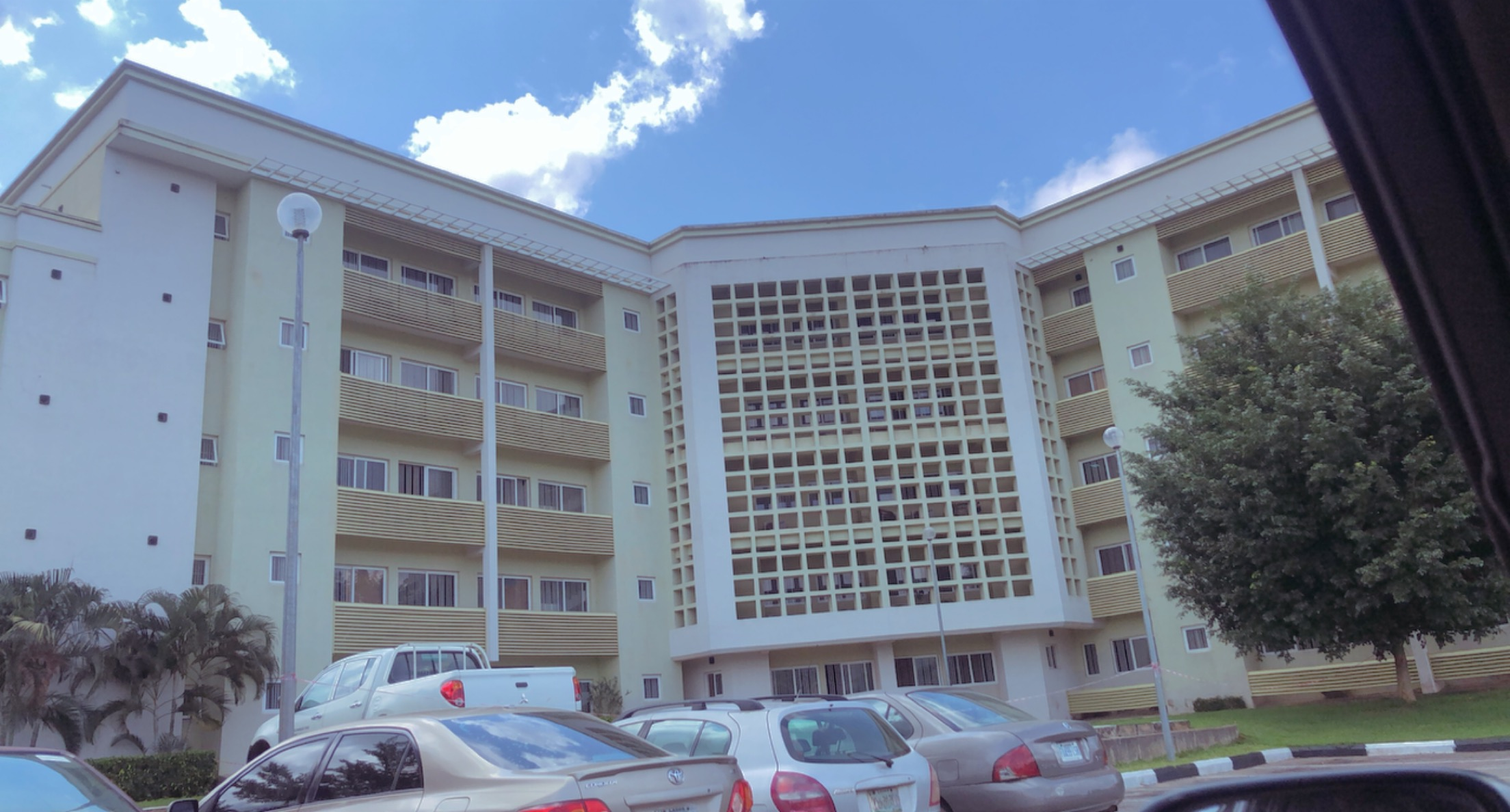
Senate building

== Notable alumni ==
- Tunji Disu, police officer
- Gregory Ojefua, Nigerian actor
