= Anthonia Kleinhoonte =

Dutch botanist (1887–1960)

Anthonia Kleinhoonte (1887 – 1960) was a Dutch botanist and experimentalist best known for her study of the circadian rhythms of plants. She created a device that measured jack bean (Canavalia ensiformis) leaf movements. She identified at least 50 plant species.

The standard author abbreviation Kleinhoonte is used to indicate this person as the author when citing a botanical name.
