= Lawrence Ayo =

Nigerian politician

Lawrence Olawumi Ayo
- Constituency: Ondo North

Senator for Ondo North
- In office 29 May 1999 – 29 May 2003
- Succeeded by: Titus Olupitan

Personal details
- Born: Owo, Ondo State, Nigeria
- Citizenship: Nigeria
- Party: Alliance for Democracy
- Occupation: Politician

Lawrence Olawumi Ayo was elected Senator for the Ondo North constituency of Ondo State, Nigeria at the start of the Nigerian Fourth Republic, running on the Alliance for Democracy (AD) platform. He took office on May 29, 1999.

== Biography ==
Ayo was born in Owo, in Ondo State. After taking his seat in the Senate, he was appointed to the Senate Committee on Ethics and Privileges. He was appointed to an ad hoc Senate committee to investigate budgetary and constitutional breaches by President Olusegun Obasanjo, but in October 2002 was among committee members who refused to sign the final report since they had not been invited to participate in its preparation. Ayo was asked, "What are your goals for going there in order to benefit both your people and the country overall?" and he responded:

There are three levels of concern. Let me start with the most important: even at the risk of being parochial, this is the local level, that is at the Senatorial District level. My cardinal points centre on (a) information dissemination; (b) people inclusion and participation; (c) targeted interventions and (d) grassroots empowerment. For once, we need to bring the full benefits of representation at the centre to the local level. The second level of concern is the state level. Here, I am concerned about complementing the activities of the state Governor, Dr. Olusegun Mimiko, towards the transformation of the entire state and to ensure that my Senatorial District is not left behind in this process and to ensure that my District takes the lead ahead of the other two districts. The third level is the national. I intend to team up with like minds in the Senate to take maximum advantage of my experience in strategies and implementation of the Nigerian e-Government programme over the last six years by taking the case for e-Government compliance at all tiers to the highest level of legislation in Nigeria. The thrust of this grand move is to facilitate legislative framework for e-Government to drive national competitiveness, which is needed to ensure productivity, growth and sustainable economic growth. It is a move aimed at getting legislative backing to mainstream ICT tools and techniques in all facets of public service at all levels and to ensure digital penetration specially designed to reach all constituencies, including rural communities.

— My bid for the Senate is God’s project, Nigeria Compass

== Succeeded ==
T.O. Olupitan succeeded Lawrence Olawumi Ayo and served from 2013 to 2017.
