= Anthonia Fatunsin =

Nigerian archaeologist

Anthonia Kehinde Fatunsin

Personal details
- Born: Owo Ondo state
- Citizenship: Nigeria
- Occupation: Archeologist
- Known for: Being the first female archaeologist from Nigeria

Anthonia Kehinde Fatunsin is a Nigerian archaeologist. She is regarded as Nigeria's first female archaeologist, and the first woman to head National museum of Ibadan. Her fieldwork has primarily focused on yoruba pottery, particularly from Owo community.

== Archaeological excavations ==
In 1981, Fatunsin began excavating Igbo'laja and Ijebu-Owo sites in Owo town to discover what was known as Owo terracotta. Babasehinde Ademuleya from Obafemi Awolowo University noted that her examination marked the second time the town had been excavated, following the 1976 visit of Ekpo Eyo. However, Fatunsin is recognised as the first to provide a comprehensive description of the characteristics of the sculptures.

== Museological career ==
Fatunshin has written about the role of archaeology in Nigerian museums and its impact on the county's cultural heritage. She has been recognised as a pioneer of postcolonial archaeological thought and interpretation in Africa.
