= Titus Olupitan =

Nigerian politician

Titus Olupitan is a Nigerian politician who served as a senator representing the Ondo North Senatorial District in the 5th National Assembly from 2003 to 2007 under the umbrella of the Alliance for Democracy (AD) party.
