= National Museum of Unity, Ibadan =

Nigerian Museum in Ibadan

Ibadan National Museum of Unity
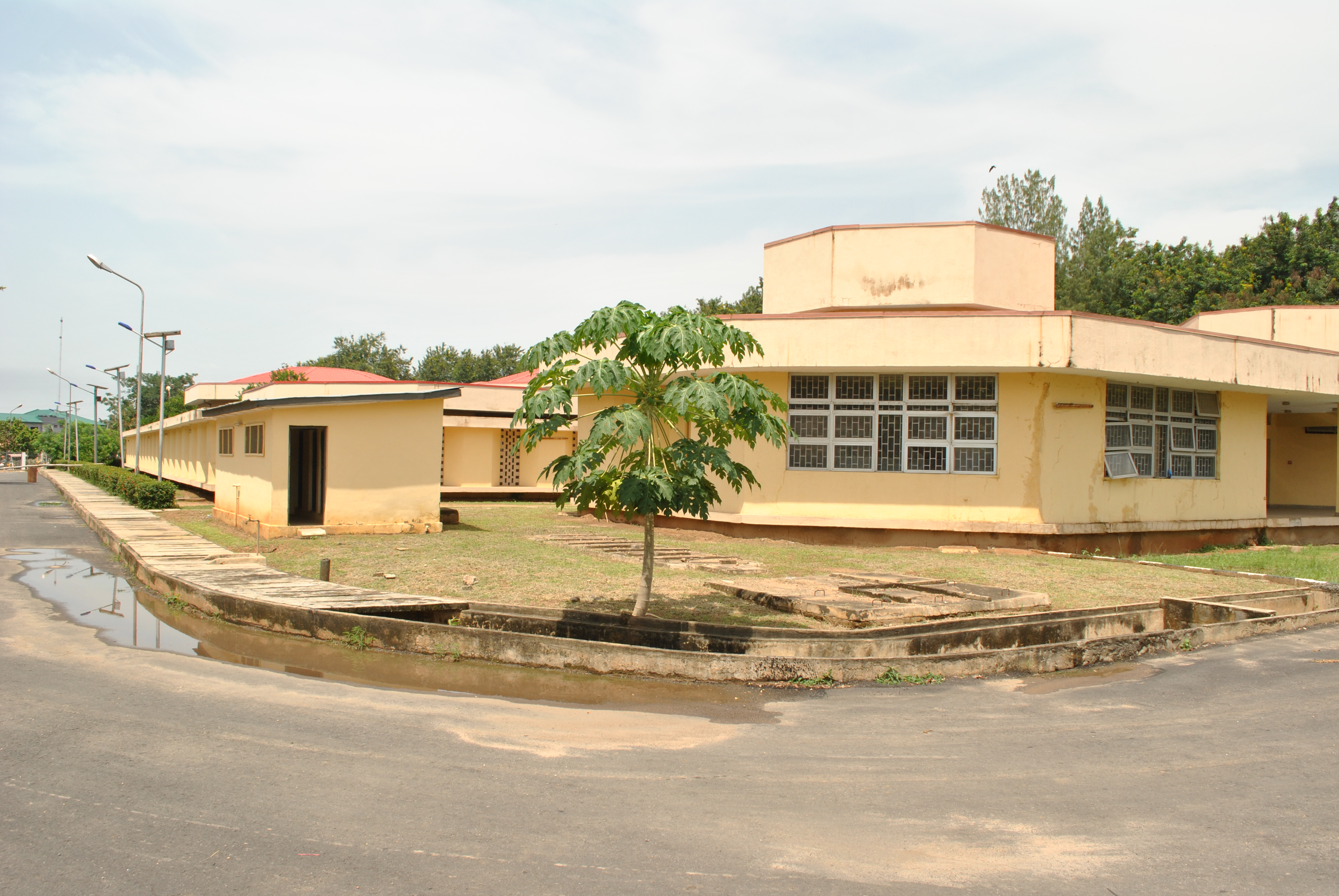
- Established: April 4, 2002; 24 years ago
- Location: National Museum Road, Ibadan South West, Oyo State, Nigeria
- Coordinates: 7.384937°N 3.868776°E
- Type: Ethnographic museum

The Ibadan National Museum of Unity is an ethnographic museum in Aleshinloye Ibadan, Nigeria. The museum is dedicated to the culture of the different ethnic groups of Nigeria.

== History ==
The idea of creating a national museum in Ibadan was proposed in 1973. The museum was created to store cultural artifacts from Nigeria. The museum was inaugurated in 2002 under the supervision of the National Commission for Museums and Monuments. In 2014, Monument Day was organized at the museum with a focus on the condition of monuments in Nigeria. In December 2017, the museum made a collaboration with OBAS for a cultural exhibition. In 2018, the museum opened a new exhibition center to promote tourism in Oyo State, this exhibition featured artifacts such as a Yoruba Shigidi figurine, (Note: Shigidi represents the effigy of a Yoruba deity.) Mumuye head mask, (Note: The Mumuye masks are used by the Mumuye people that lives in north-eastern Nigeria, these masks are used in rituals.) Ekoi Head Dress, (Note: The Ekoi Head Dress is worn by the women of the Ekoi people of southeastern Nigeria, the headdress is fastened with a cord under the chin, while covering the body with a long gown.) Benin Rooster Bronze and Edo Metal Bells.

== Collections ==
The masquerade gallery features exhibits about Egunguns, Mmaawun, Ekpo, Egwu Atta, Dodo and Ekpe, as well as information about the spirituality of the Yoruba, Igbo, Efik, Ibibio and Ebira cultures in Nigeria's Middle Belt region. The museum also contains musical instruments such as drums, as well as royalties, effigies and masks from different parts of Nigeria. The museum has an exhibit on pottery that includes bowl-shaped pots called Kula that are used for preparing food. The museum contains sculptures of Nnamdi Azikwe, Tafawa Balewa and Ladoke Akintola, as well as exhibits about the Hausa, Igbo and Yoruba tribes of Nigeria. The museum contains antiques such as artistic representations of Orisa Oko, Ile Ori, (Note: It is an ornamental garment worn by the Yoruba people on their heads and is made of cotton and leather.) Orisa Ibeji dolls, Amu clay pot used to store water, traditional lamps known in Yoruba and Hausa language as Fitila and wooden xylophones. The museum also contains gongs and rattles, as well as a collection of pottery including traditional plates and bowls. The museum contains a collection of ritual pots used in Yoruba religion including Esu, Ogun and Osun. The museum contains traditional textiles as well as exhibits explaining the history of Aso-Oke. The museum contains the car of the Premier of the Western Region, Ladoke Akintola. The museum also contains cultural artifacts such as Epa masks, Esie soapstone figures, as well as a collection of traditional African instruments including Ogboni drums, (Note: The Ogboni Drums are used by the Yoruba people in different cultural events such as ceremonies, festivals and funerals.) Agidigbos and Egun Sato drum. (Note: This type of drum is originally from Benin, where it was brought to Nigeria, it is a tall drum and is used for moments of celebration.) The museum contains a gallery called "Gallery of Unity", in which various musical instruments are exhibited, including the cylindrical drum called "Joko-tofofo", used to cure impotence. In addition, in the pottery gallery, there are pots with perforations used for frying called "Ikoko".
