= Ondo State Ministry of Education, Science and Technology =

Ondo State Ministry of Education, Science and Technology is part of the state ministries in Ondo State, Nigeria.

== Background ==
The Ministry has responsibility of ensuring quality education and development of policies to enhance science and technology. The ministry was created in 1999. Its current commissioner is Hon. Femi Agagu. Agagu formulated an education endowment fund with the aim of advancing the education sector of the state.

The departments under the Ministry of Education, Science and Technology include:

- Accounts
- Inspectorate and Quality Assurance
- School Services
- Sciences and Technology
- Planning, Research and Statistics etc.
