= Patrick Ayo Akinyelure =

Nigerian banker

National Senator
- Incumbent
- Assumed office June 2019
- Preceded by: Tayo Alasoadura
- Constituency: Ondo Central

Personal details
- Born: Idanre
- Party: People's Democratic Party (PDP)

Patrick Ayo Akinyelure is a Nigerian banker who was elected to the Nigerian Senate for the Ondo Central district in Ondo State in the 9 April 2011 elections running on the Labour Party ticket (he was subsequently re-elected to the same position). Ayo is an approved tax practitioner of the Chartered Institute of Taxation of Nigeria. He was Group Executive Chairman of the Allover Group, a microfinance lender, from 1994 to 2010. In January 2011 he denied that officials of the Economic and Financial Crimes Commission (EFCC) had investigated him over the withdrawal of the bank's licence by the Central Bank of Nigeria.

Patrick Ayo Akinyelure was Labour party candidate for the Ondo South Senatorial seat in April 2007. In July 2008 an Election Petition Tribunal in Akure nullified the election of Senator Gbenga Ogunniya of the People's Democratic Party (PDP) based on Akinyelure's petition. Ogunniya succeeded in appealing this decision. In the 9 April 2011 elections, Akinyelure ran again and this time was elected with 113,292 votes, ahead of Gbenga Ogunniya of the PDP with 41,783 votes.
