= Robert Ajayi Boroffice =

Nigerian politician (born 1949)

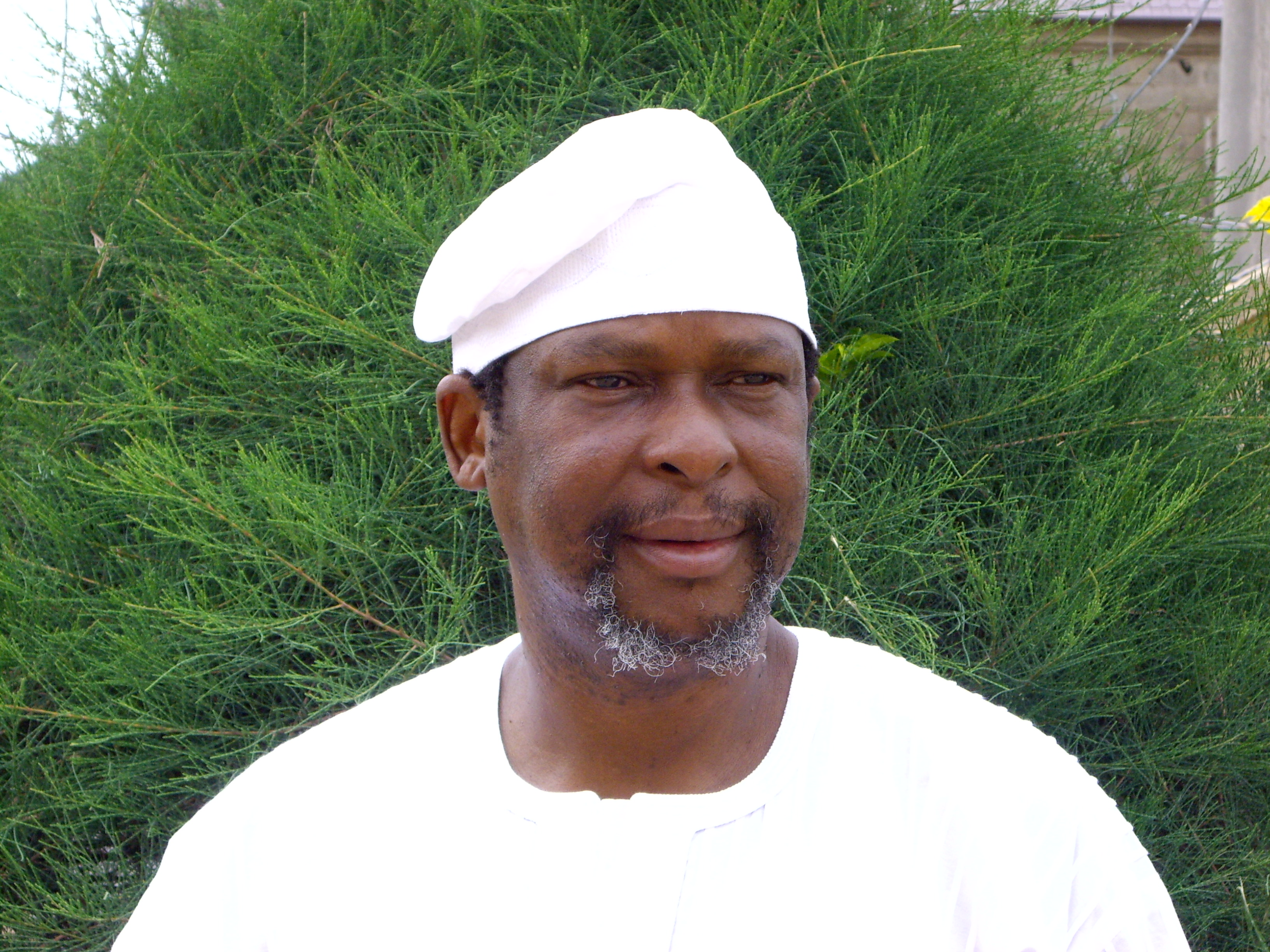

Senator for Ondo North
- In office 6 June 2011 – 11 June 2023
- Preceded by: Bode Olajumoke
- Succeeded by: Jide Ipinsagba

Personal details
- Born: 23 April 1949 (age 76) Oka-Akoko, Southern Region, British Nigeria (now in Ondo State, Nigeria)
- Party: All Progressives Congress
- Profession: Politician; academic; professor

Robert Ajayi Boroffice (born 23 April 1949) is a Nigerian politician who was Senator for Ondo North from 2011 to 2023.

== Early career ==
Boroffice was born on 23 April 1949 in Oka-Akoko, Ondo State, South Western, Nigeria. He became a lecturer at the University of Ibadan in 1975, and Professor of Zoology at the Lagos State University in 1986. He once held administrative positions at the Lagos State University including Head of Department, Dean of Faculty, and Chairman of the Committee of Deans.

== Public servant ==
Boroffice was appointed Coordinating Director for Science in the National Agency for Science and Engineering Infrastructure in 1992. He worked on biotechnology, Information and Communication Technology and Space Science and Technology which led to establishing the National Biotechnology Development Agency, National Information Technology Development Agency and the National Space Research and Development Agency.

In 2004, Boroffice was awarded the title of Officer of the Order of the Niger (OON) by former President Olusegun Obasanjo. In March 2011, Boroffice was given the 2011 Golden Merit Award in Space Science by the World Federation of Science Journalists.

== Political career ==
Boroffice faced little opposition in his bid to become Labour Party candidate for the Ondo North Senatorial District. He gained the support of traditional rulers in the Akoko area of Ondo State. In an interview before the April elections, he criticized politicians who lacked integrity and honor, making promises they could not keep in order to get elected, and then focusing on making money once elected. In the election, Boroffice gained 84,290 votes. Runners up were the incumbent Senator Bode Olajumoke of the People's Democratic Party (PDP) with 51,112 votes and Agunloye Olu of the Action Congress of Nigeria with 36,601 votes.

On 28 December 2011, Boroffice decamped to the Action Congress of Nigeria so that he could pursue his ambition of becoming the next governor of Ondo state. Later, he decamped to the All Progressives Congress, the ruling party. On 2 July, the president of the Nigeria’s Senate, Ahmed Lawal, announced Borrofice as one of the deputy majority leader of the 9th senate.
