= Ondo State =

State of Nigeria

Ondo
- State
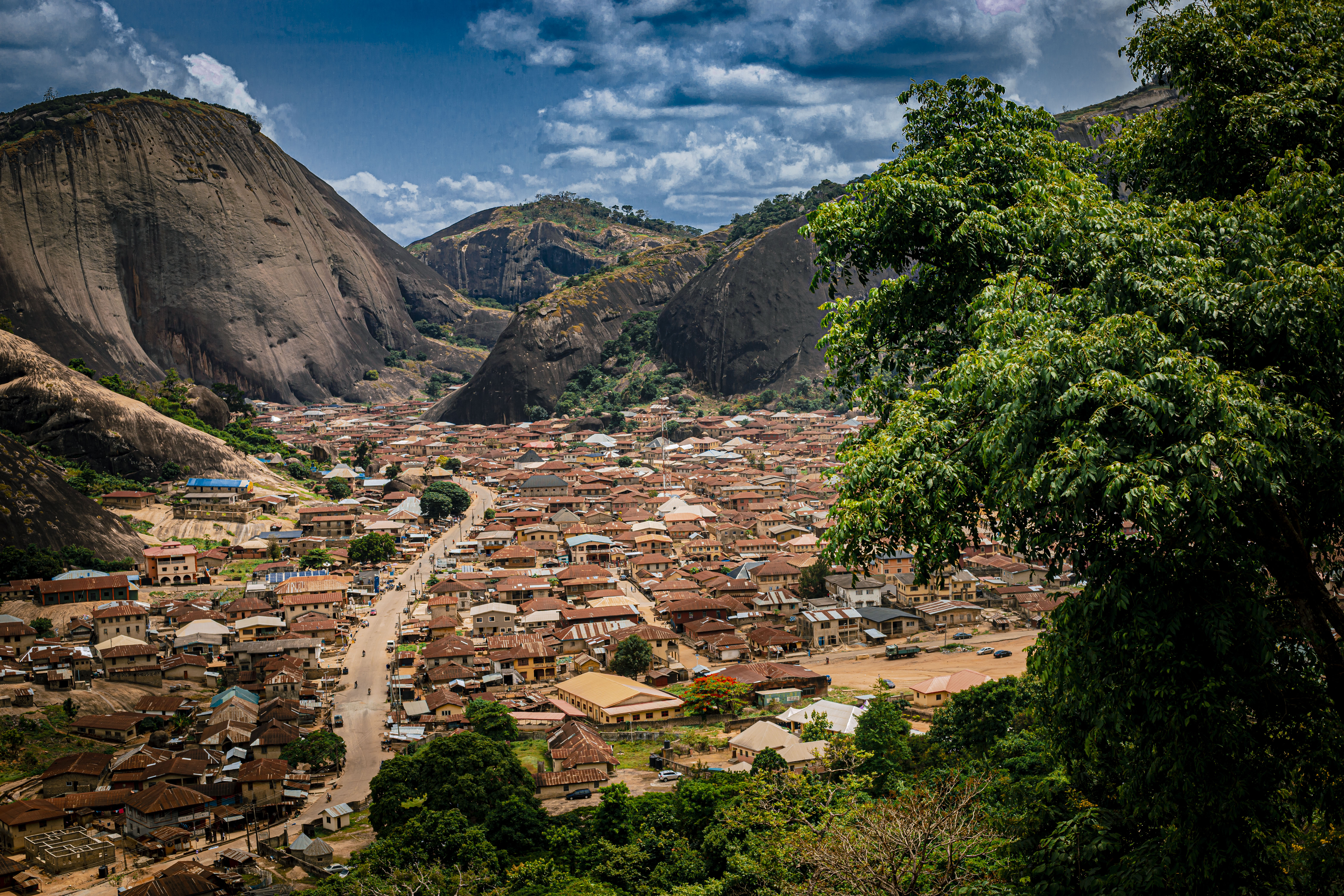
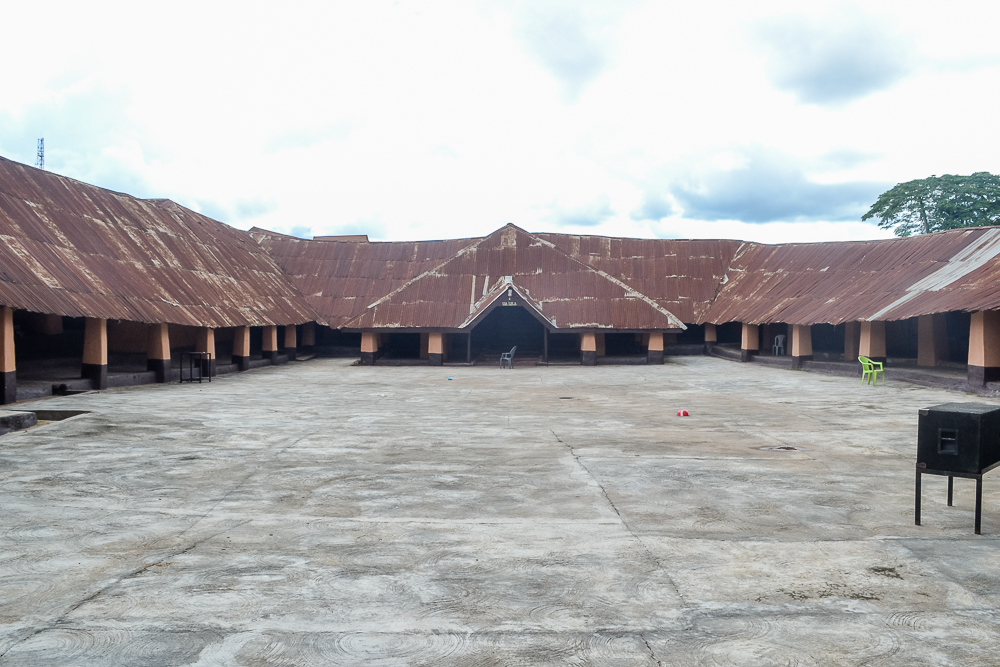
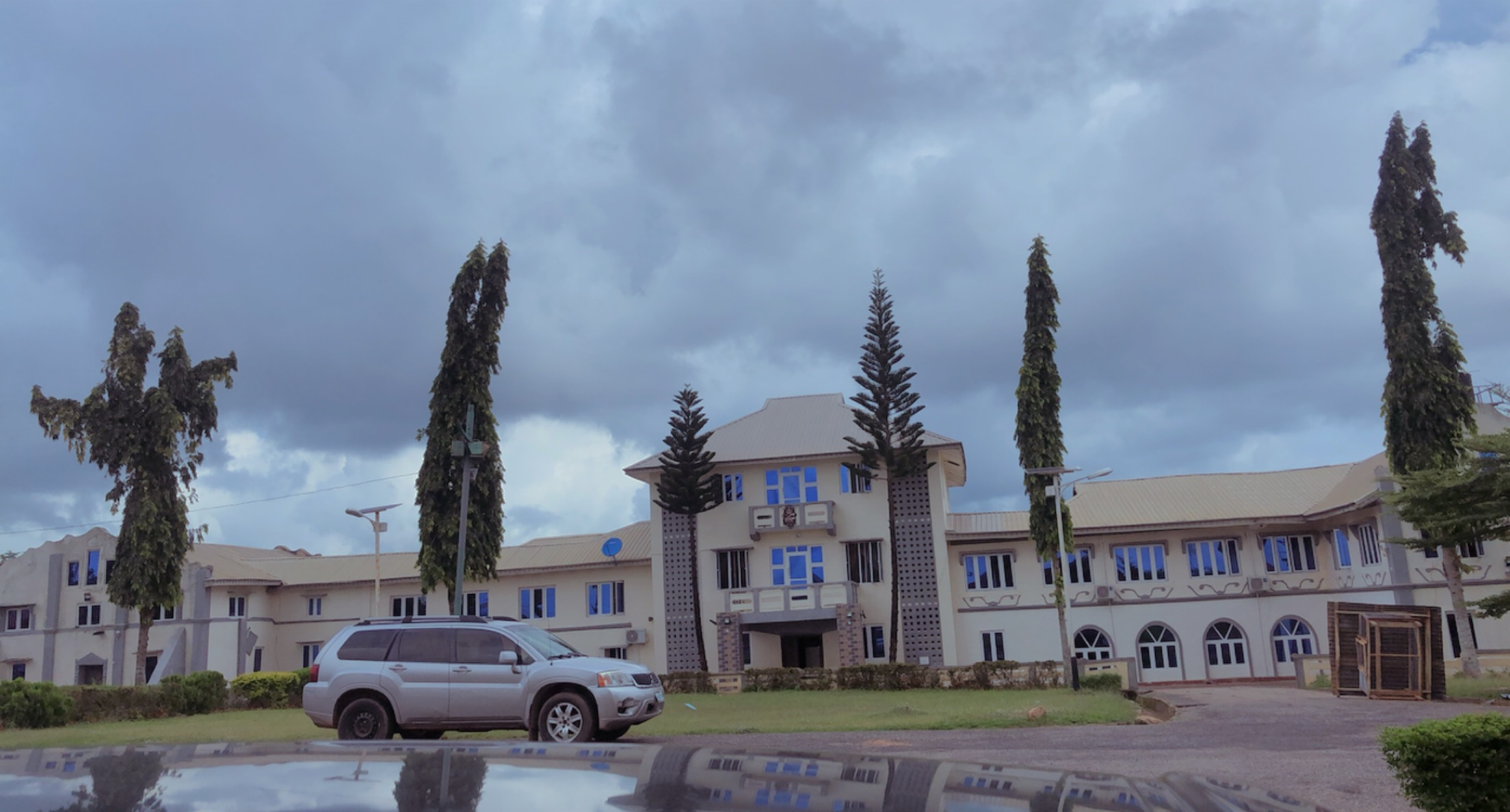
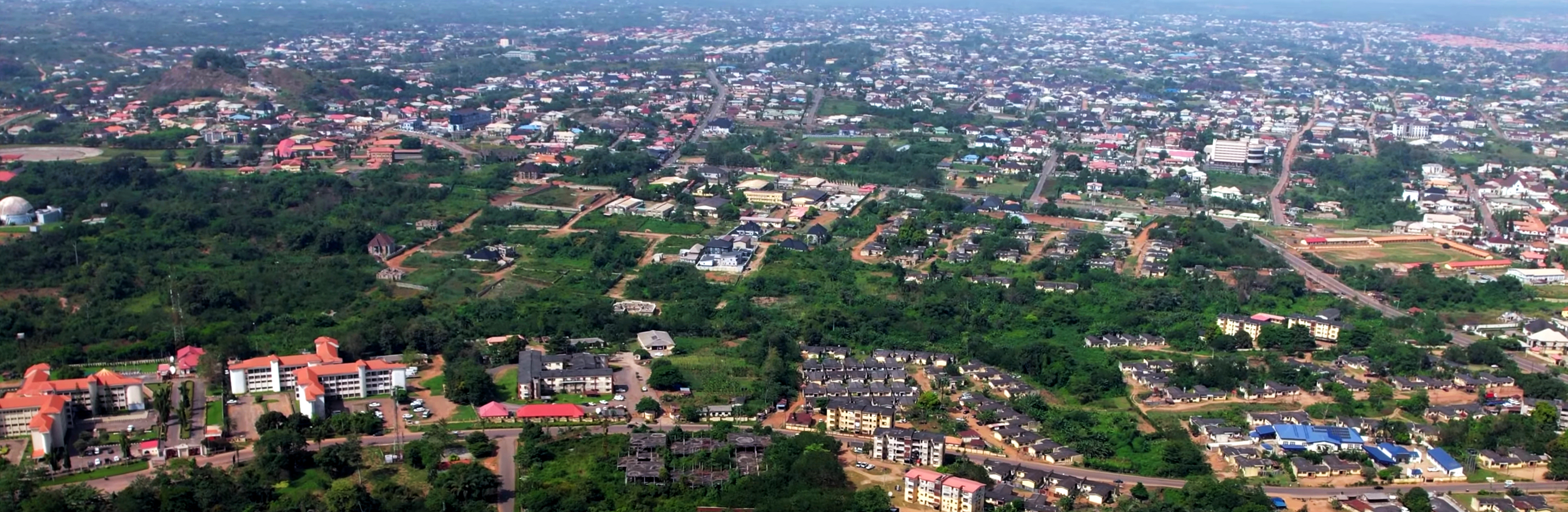
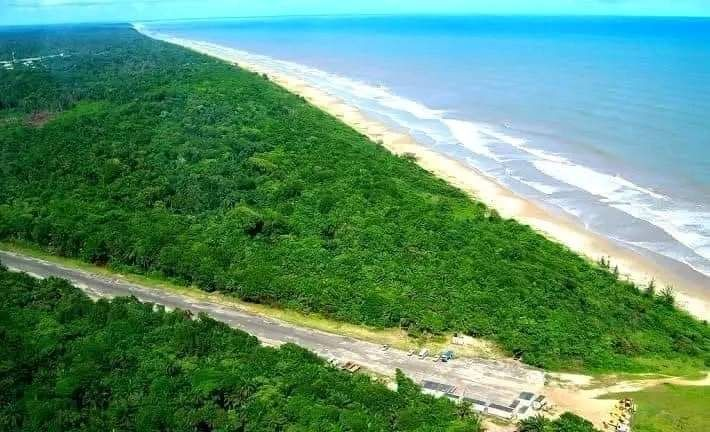
- Idanre Hill And the Idanre town Palace of the Deji of Akure Owo Museum Akure, the capital Ara-Romi Beach

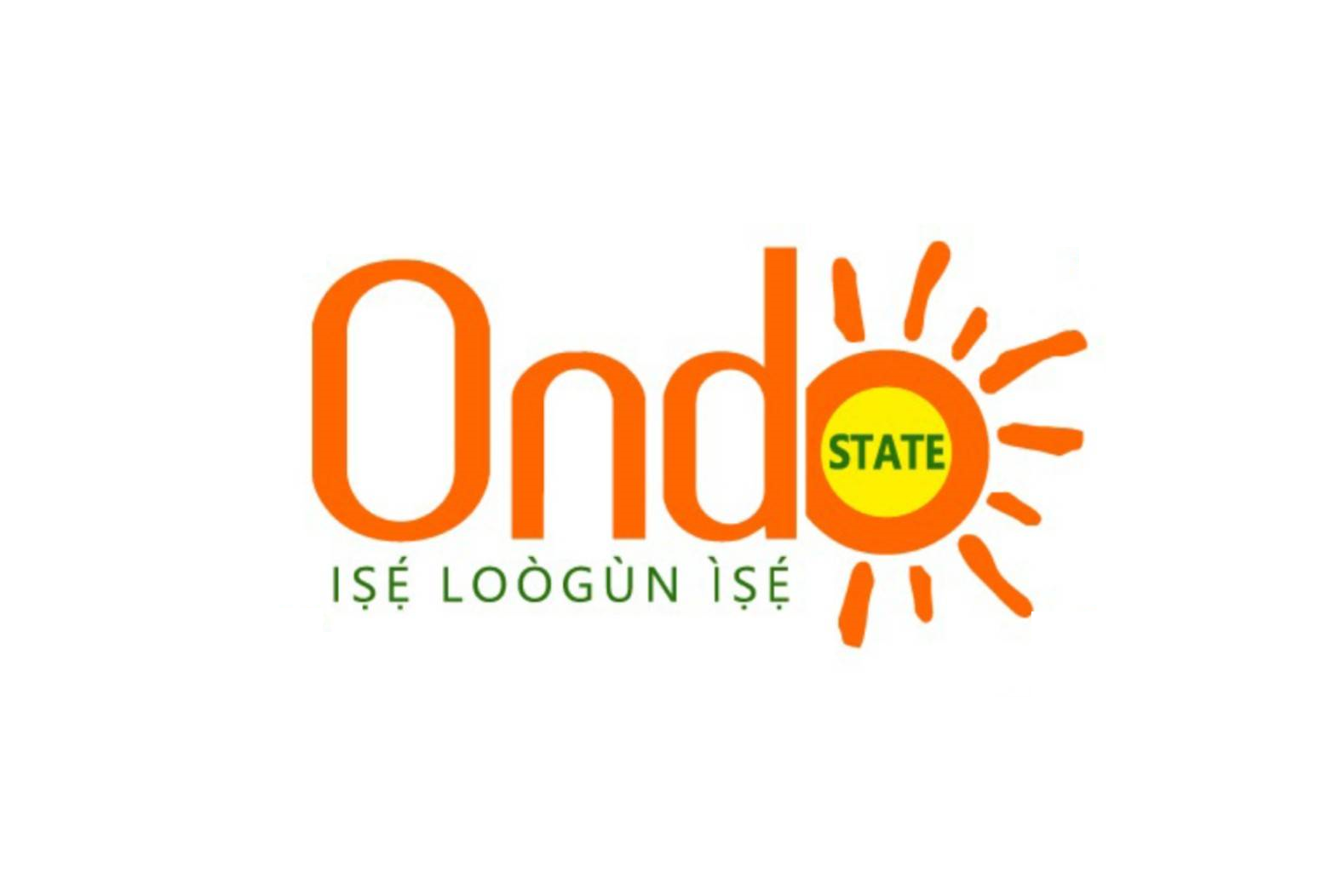
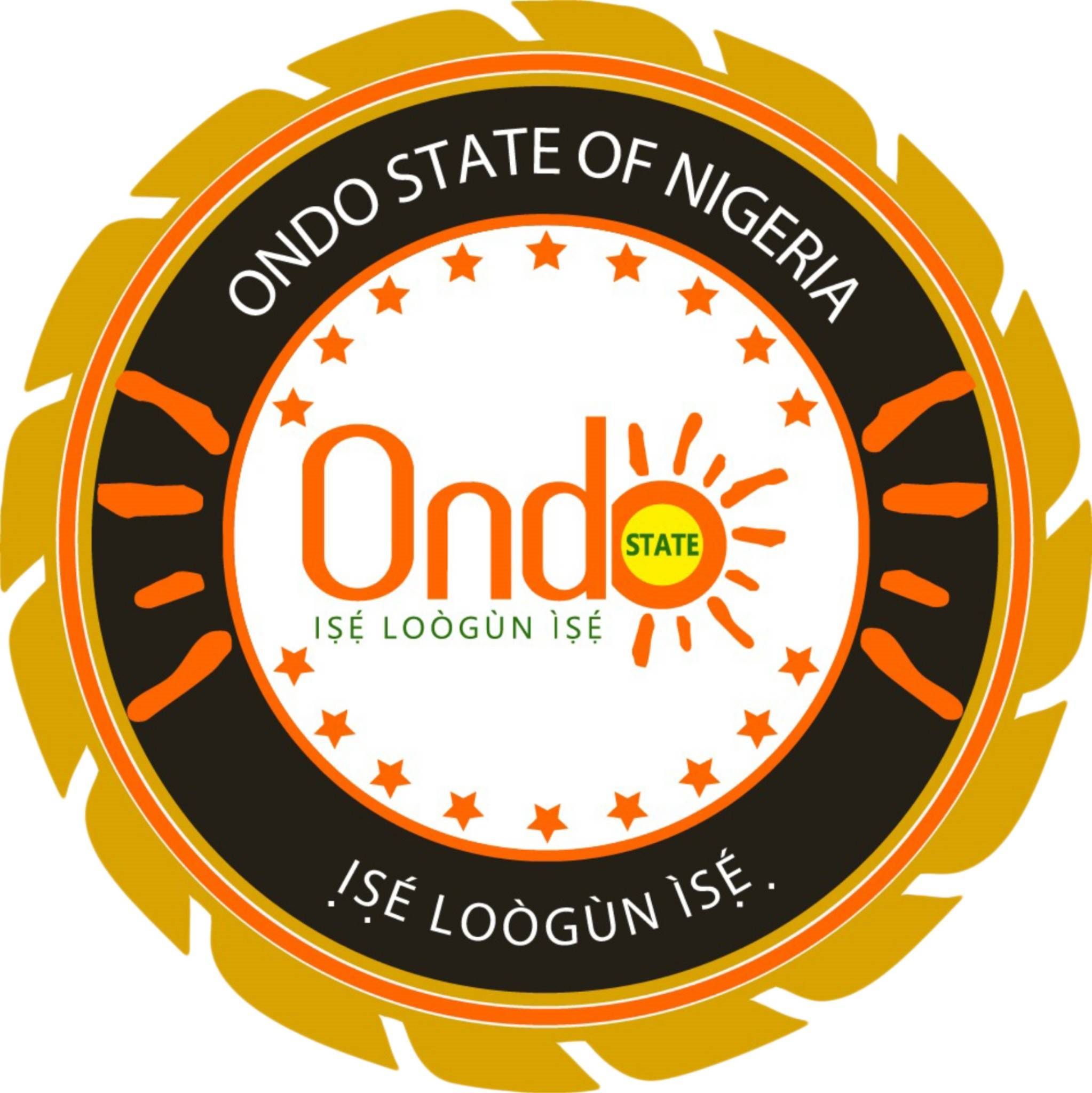
- Flag Seal
- Nicknames: Sunshine State
- Location of Ondo State in Nigeria
- Coordinates: 7°10′N 5°05′E
- Country: Nigeria
- LGAs: 18
- Date created: 3 February 1976
- Capital: Akure

Government
  - Body: Government of Ondo State
  - Governor (List): Lucky Aiyedatiwa (APC)
  - Deputy Governor: Olayide Adelami
  - Legislature: Ondo State House of Assembly
  - Senators: C: Adeniyi Adegbonmire (APC); N: Jide Ipinsagba (APC); S: Jimoh Ibrahim (APC)
  - Representatives: List

Area
  - Total: 15,500 km^{2} (6,000 sq mi)
  - Rank: 25th of 36

Population (2006 census)^{1}
  - Total: 3,460,877
  - Estimate (2022): 5316600
  - Rank: 18th of 36
  - Density: 223/km^{2} (578/sq mi)

GDP (PPP)
  - Year: 2021
  - Total: $33.00 billion 7th of 36
  - Per capita: $6,077; 7th of 36
- Time zone: UTC+01 (WAT)
- postal code: 340001
- ISO 3166 code: NG-ON
- HDI (2022): 0.611 medium · 12th of 37

Ondo (Yoruba: Ìpínlẹ̀ Oǹdó) is a state in southwestern Nigeria. It was created on 3 February 1976 from the former Western State. Ondo borders Ekiti State to the north for 132 km, Kogi State to the northeast for 45 km, Edo State to the east for 304 km (189 miles), Delta State to the southeast for 36 km, Ogun State to the southwest for 179 km, Osun State to the northwest for 77 km, and the Atlantic Ocean to the south. The state's capital is Akure, the former capital of the ancient Akure Kingdom. The State includes mangrove-swamp forest near the Bight of Benin.

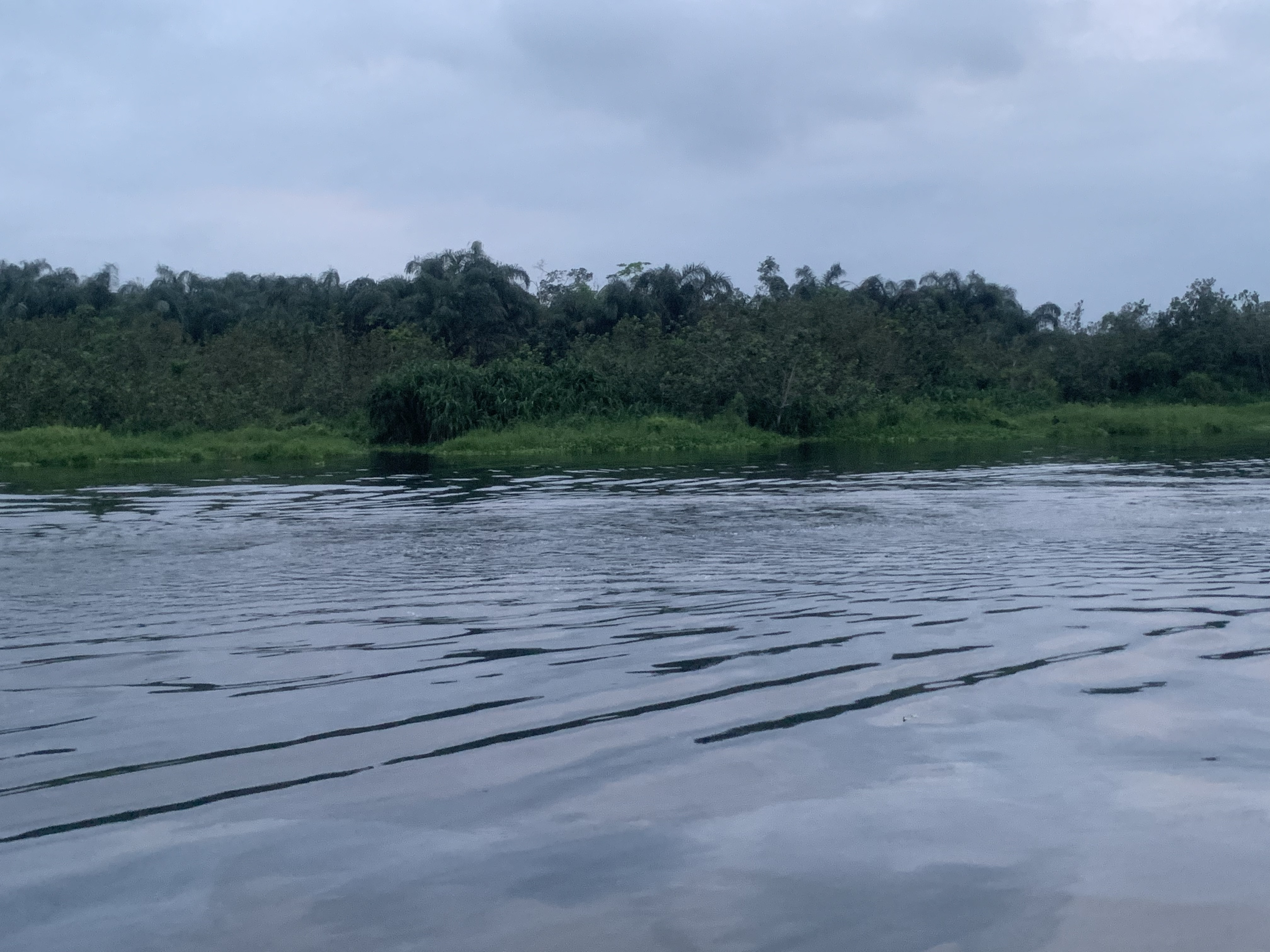
Creek in southern Ondo state

Nicknamed the "Sunshine State", Ondo State is the 18th most populated state in the country, and the 25th-largest state by landmass. The state is predominantly Yoruba, and the Yoruba language is commonly spoken. Cocoa production, farming, asphalt mining, and activities related to the state's extensive coastline also are part of the economy. It is home to the Idanre inselberg hills, the highest geographical point in the western half of Nigeria at over 1,000 metres (3,300 ft) in elevation.

== Government and society ==
=== Departments, Agencies and Public Bodies ===
- Secretary to the State Government
- Administrative Commissions
- Ministry of Works and Infrastructure
- Constitutional Commissions
- Deputy Governor's Office
- Governor's Office
- Ministry of Agriculture
- Ministry of Commerce, Industries and Cooperatives
- Ministry of Culture and Tourism
- Ministry of Economic Planning and Budget
- Directorate of Rural and Community Development
- Ministry of Education, Science and Technology
- Ministry of Environment
- Ministry of Finance
- Ministry of Information and Orientation
- Ministry of Justice
- Ministry of Lands and Housing
- Ministry of Natural Resources
- Ministry of Physical Planning and Urban Development
- Ministry of Regional Integration and Special Duties
- Ministry of Women Affairs and Social Development
- Ministry of Youth and Sports Development

The state contains eighteen local government areas, the major ones being Akoko, Akure, Okitipupa, Ondo, Ilaje, Idanre and Owo. The majority of the state's citizens live in urban centers. The prominent government universities in Ondo State are the Federal University of Technology Akure, Ondo State University of Science and Technology Okitipupa, University of Medical Sciences, Ondo and the Adekunle Ajasin University, Akungba Akoko.

=== Local government areas ===
Ondo State consists of 18 local government areas, they are:

- Akoko North-East (headquarters in Ikare)
- Akoko North-West (headquarters in Okeagbe)
- Akoko South-East (headquarters in Isua)
- Akoko South-West (headquarters in Oka)
- Akure North (headquarters in Iju / Itaogbolu)
- Akure South (headquarters in Akure)
- Ese Odo (headquarters in Igbekebo)
- Idanre (headquarters in Owena)
- Ifedore (headquarters in Igbara Oke)
- Ilaje (headquarters in Igbokoda)
- Ile Oluji/Okeigbo (headquarters in Ile Oluji)
- Irele (headquarters Ode-Irele)
- Odigbo (headquarters in Ore)
- Okitipupa (headquarters in Okitipupa)
- Ondo East (headquarters in Bolorunduro)
- Ondo West (headquarters Ondo Town)
- Ose (headquarters in Ifon)
- Owo (headquarters in Owo Town)

== Governor ==
Lucky Aiyedatiwa is the incumbent governor of Ondo state, as at 2024. He was sworn in on 27 December 2023 as the successor of Oluwarotimi Odunayo Akeredolu who was pronounced dead in the earlier hour of 27 December 2023 out of cancer complications.

== Politics ==
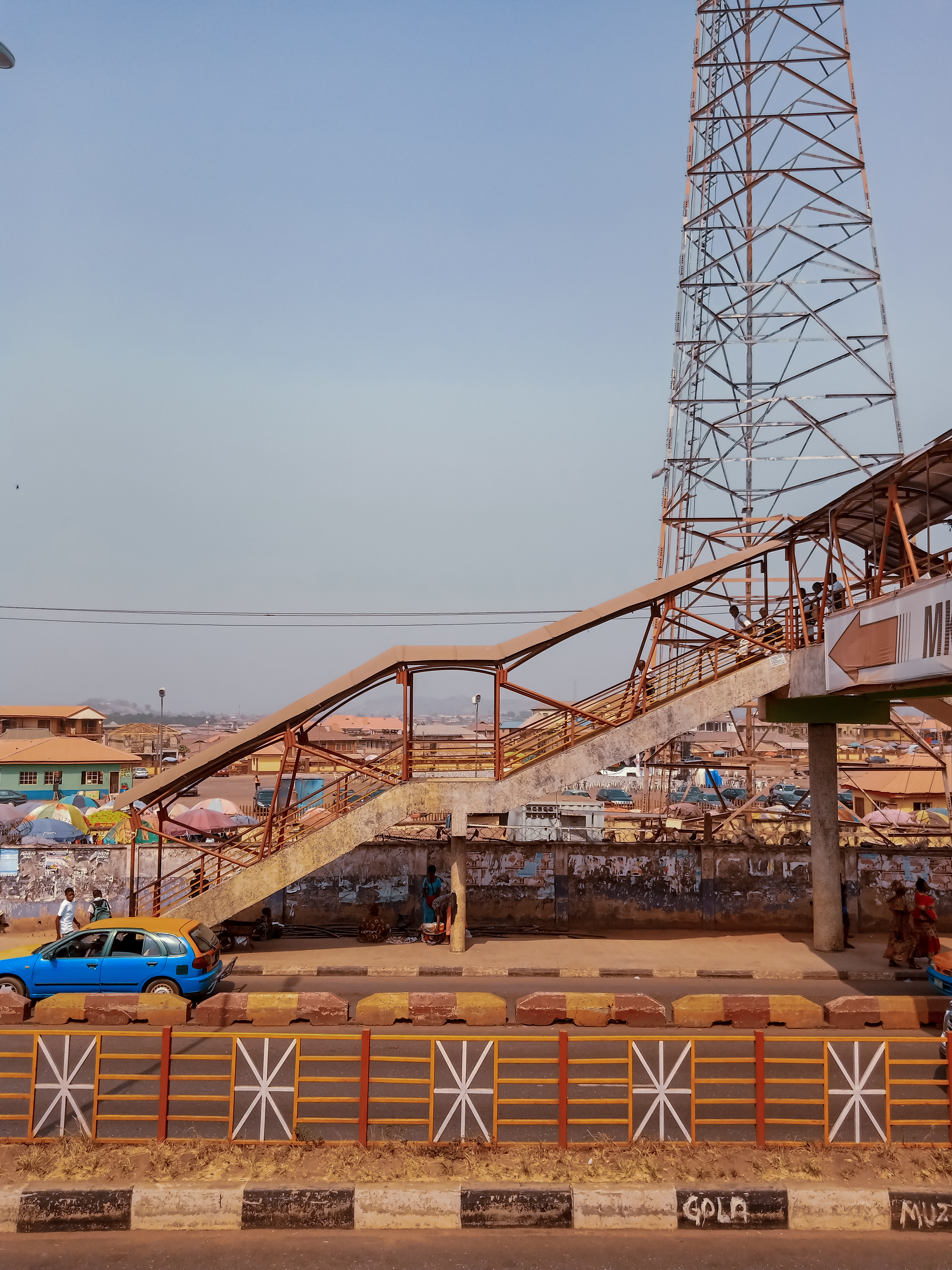

The State government is led by a democratically elected governor who works closely with members of the state's House of Assembly. The Capital city of the State is Akure.

== Electoral system ==
The electoral system of each state is selected using a modified two-round system. To be elected in the first round, a candidate must receive the plurality of the vote and over 25% of the vote in at least two-thirds of the State local government Areas. If no candidate passes the threshold, a second round will be held between the top candidate and the next candidate to have received a plurality of votes in the highest number of local government Areas.

== Ethnic groups ==
The ethnic composition of Ondo State mainly consists of Yoruba subgroups of the Idanre, Akoko, Akure, Ikale, Ilaje, Ondo, Ese Odo, Owo and Ose peoples. Ijaw people, such as the Apoi and Arogbo populations inhabit the southeastern swamps close to the Edo state border. A small population of people speak a variant of the Yoruba language similar to the Ife dialect in Oke-Igbo town close to the Osun state border.

== Religion ==
The vast majority of the population are Christians; minorities practice Islam and traditional Yoruba animist religion.

The Anglican Province of Ondo (2002?) within the Church of Nigeria includes the Dioceses of Akoko (2008) led by Bishop Jacob O.B. Bada (2019), Akure led by Bishop Simeon Borokini (2013), also Archbishop of Ondo Province (2022), On the Coast (1995 as the Diocese of Ikale-Ilaje) led by Bishop Seyi Pirisola (2019), Idoani led by Bishop Adegoke Oludare Agara (2020), Ilaje led by Bishop Fredrick Idowu Olugbemi (2009), Ile-Oluji led by Bishop Abel Oluyemi Ajibodu (2017), Irele-Eseodo (2009) led by Bishop Joshua Sunday Oyinlola (2019), Ondo (1952) led by Bishop Stephen Adeniran Oni (2018), and Owo (1983) led Bishop Stephen Ayodeji Fagbemi (2017).

174,148 Catholics (2021) in the Diocese of Ondo (1943) a suffragan of Ibadan, with 60 parishes under Bishop Jude Ayodeji Arogundade (2010).

== Climate ==
Ondo has a tropical wet and dry or savanna climate. The city's yearly temperature is 28.42 °C (83.16 °F) and it is -1.04% lower than Nigeria's averages. Ondo typically receives about 1.711 millimetres (7.2 inches) of precipitation and has 266.26 rainy days (72.95% of the time) annually.

== Languages ==
Languages of Ondo State listed by LGA:

LGA	Languages
Akoko South East	Yoruba; (Ao), Uhami, Ukue
Akoko South West	Yoruba; (Akoko, Ekiti)
Akoko North East	Yoruba; (Akoko), Ukaan
Akoko North West	Yoruba; (Akoko, Ekiti), Abesabesi, Ayere, Arigidi
Akure North	Yoruba; (Ekiti)
Akure South	Yoruba; (Ekiti)
Ese-Odo	Yoruba; (Apoi), Ijaw; (Izon)
Idanre	Yoruba; (Ondo, Ekiti)
Ifedore	Yoruba; (Ekiti)
Ilaje	Yoruba; (Ilaje)
Ile Oluji/Okeigbo	Yoruba; (Ondo, Ife)
Irele	Yoruba; (Ikale)
Odigbo	Yoruba; (Ikale, Ondo)
Okitipupa	Yoruba; (Ikale)
Ondo East	Yoruba; (Ondo)
Ondo West	Yoruba; (Ondo)
Ose	Yoruba; (Ogho, Ao), Owan; (Ora)
Owo	Yoruba; (Ogho)

== Mineral resources in Ondo State ==
The following are mineral resources found in Ondo State:

- Bitumen
- Coal
- Oil and gas
- Dimension stone
- Feldspar
- Gemstones
- Glass/and
- Granite
- Gypsum
- Kaolin
- Limestone

== Tertiary institutions ==
- Adekunle Ajasin University, Akungba Akoko
- Achievers University, Owo
- Adeyemi College of Education
- Elizade University, Ilara-Mokin
- Federal College of Agriculture, Akure
- Federal Polytechnic, Ile Oluji
- Federal University of Technology Akure
- National Open University of Nigeria, Akure
- Ondo State University of Science and Technology, Okitipupa
- Rufus Giwa Polytechnic, Owo
- University of Medical Sciences, Ondo
- Wesley University of Science and Technology

== Transportation ==
Federal Highways are

- A121 (TAH8: Trans-African Highway 8 Lagos-Mombasa) east from Ogun State via Ore to Edo State at Ofosu,
- A122 southeast from Osun State at Igbara Oke via Akure to Edo State.

Other major roads include:

- the Ondo-Ife Rd northwest from Ondo to Osun State at Okeigo,
- Ipetu-Ondo Rd north from Ondo to A122 at Ikeji Oke in Osun State,
- Ondo-Owena Rd east from Ondo to Akure,
- Igede Ekiti Oke Rd north from A122 at Ilawe to Ekiti State at Ibuji,
- Oba-Ile Rd north from Akure to the Ijare-Akure Rd via Ilere and Ijare to Ekiti State,
- Akure Ado Ekiti Rd north from Akure via Ilado and Iju to Ekiti State,
- Owo-Emure Ile Rd north from A122 at Emure to Ekiti State,
- Owo-Obra Rd north from A122 at Owo as the Ikare-Akoko-Ipeme Rd to Kogi State as the Kabba-Arigidi Rd,
- Ipele-Kabba Rd from A122 at Ipele Junction to Kogi State at Akunnu,
- Akure-Ala-Ajagbusi Rd south from Akure as the Igbatoro Rd to Edo State at Ogbesse.

Airports:

Akure Airport

== Demographics ==
Population distribution of Ondo State
Local government area	Male	Female	Total
Akoko North-West	107,076	104,791	211,867
Akoko North-East	92,456	86,636	179,092
Akoko South-East	42,175	40,268	82,433
Akoko South-West	114,733	113,650	228,383
Ose	73,119	71,020	144,139
Owo	112,056	110,206	222,262
Akure North	66,526	64,239	130,765
Akure South	178,652	181,596	360,268
Ifedore	89,574	86,796	176,370
Ile Oluji	87,104	84,772	171,876
Ondo West	141,759	147,109	288,868
Ondo East	38,851	37,241	76,092
Idanre	67,531	62,264	129,795
Odigbo	116,299	115,988	232,587
Okitipupa	117,594	116,544	234,138
Irele	72,861	71,275	144,136
Ese Odo	79,812	78,444	158,256
Ilaje	146,859	142,979	289,838
Total	1,745,057	1,715,820	3,460,877

== Notable people ==
- Mo Abudu, media mogul
- Gani Adams, activist and politician
- King Sunny Adé, musician
- Adebayo Adefarati, former governor of Ondo State
- Rotimi Adelola, former Secretary to the State Government
- Tayo Adenaike, painter
- Ilesanmi Adesida, physicist
- Akintunde Aduwo, former governor of Western Region/navy vice
- Olusegun Agagu, former governor of Ondo State
- Michael Adekunle Ajasin, politician, former governor of Ondo State
- Kayode Ajulo, lawyer
- Rotimi Akeredolu, former governor of Ondo State
- Abayomi Akinruntan, politician
- Akintunde Akinwande, engineering professor
- Yemi Alade, musician
- Funmi Aragbaye, gospel singer
- Bamidele Aturu, human rights activist
- Akinyelure Patrick Ayo, banker and politician
- Tinuade Babalola, traditional ruler/monarch of the Iboropa-Akoko kingdom
- Reekado Banks, singer-songwriter
- Robert Ajayi Boroffice, politician
- Emmanuel Daraloye, Nigerian music journalist
- Hosea Ehinlanwo, former senator
- Omotola Jalade Ekeinde, actress and singer
- Chinko Ekun, singer and rapper
- Gbenga Elegbeleye, politician, former Ondo State House of Representatives member
- Olu Falae, banker and politician
- Frederick Fasehun, medical doctor, activist and politician
- Anthonia Fatunsin, Nigerian archeologist
- Gani Fawehinmi, author and lawyer
- Jimoh Ibrahim, lawyer and politician
- T. B. Joshua, pastor and philanthropist
- Adetokunbo Kayode, lawyer and politician
- Boluwaji Kunlere, former senator
- Ayo Makun (AY Show), comedian and entertainer
- Ayodele Olawande, Nigerian politician
- Nahzeem Olufemi Mimiko, educational administrator
- Olusegun Mimiko, former governor of Ondo State
- Bode Olajumoke, politician
- Chris Olukolade, army general
- Sola Sobowale, actress and director
- Omoyele Sowore, human rights activist
- Adekunle Temitope (a.k.a. Small Doctor), musical artist
- Akinloye Tofowomo, performing musician
- Olubunmi Tunji-Ojo, Nigerian politician, entrepreneur and philanthropist
- Waje, musical artist
- Olubukola Arowolo Verheijen, Special Adviser to the President of Nigeria on Oil and Gas.

== Media houses in Ondo State ==
- Adaba 88.9FM
- ALALAYE 96.5FM
- Breeze 91.9FM
- Crest 87.7 FM
- Eki Radio 100.9 FM
- EMPIRE 104.5 FM
- FUTA Radio
- The Hope Newspapers
- INSIDE FUTA
- KAFTAN TV
- Kàkàkí Òndó FM
- Nigerian Television Authority (NTA)
- Orange 94.5FM
- OSRC Television
- Positive 102.5FM
- Remdel Television
- RUGIPO 103.3 FM
- Suncity Radio 101.1FM

== Gallery ==
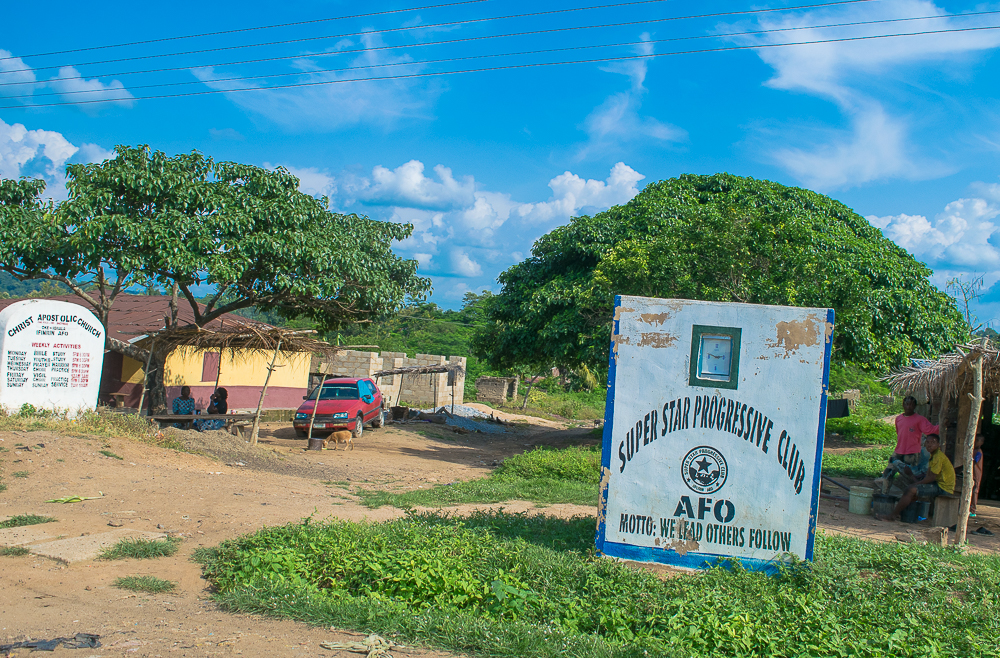

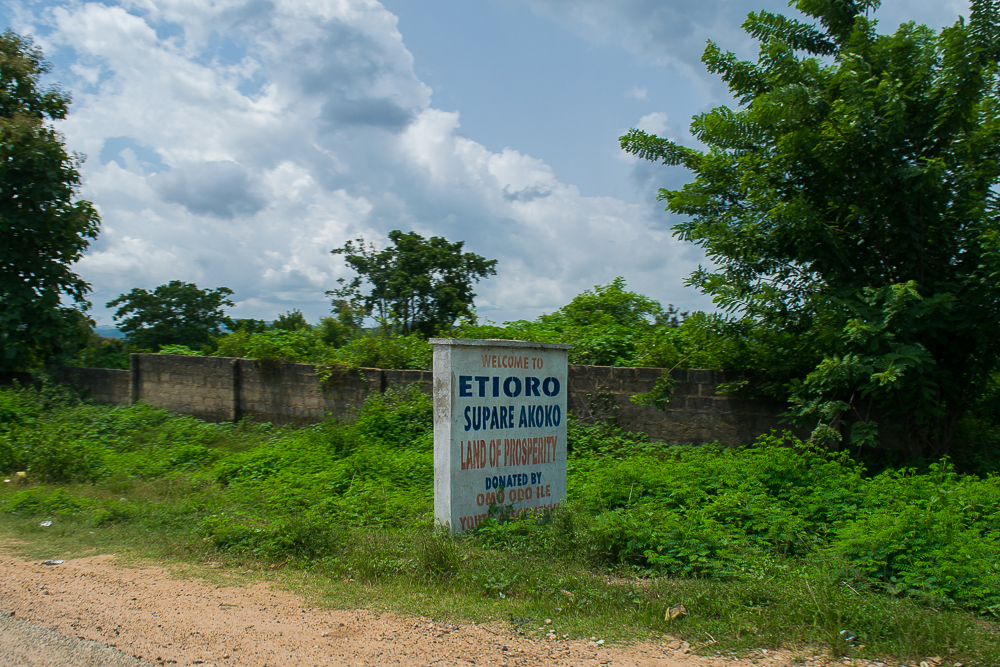
Welcome to Etiaro, Akoko signpost

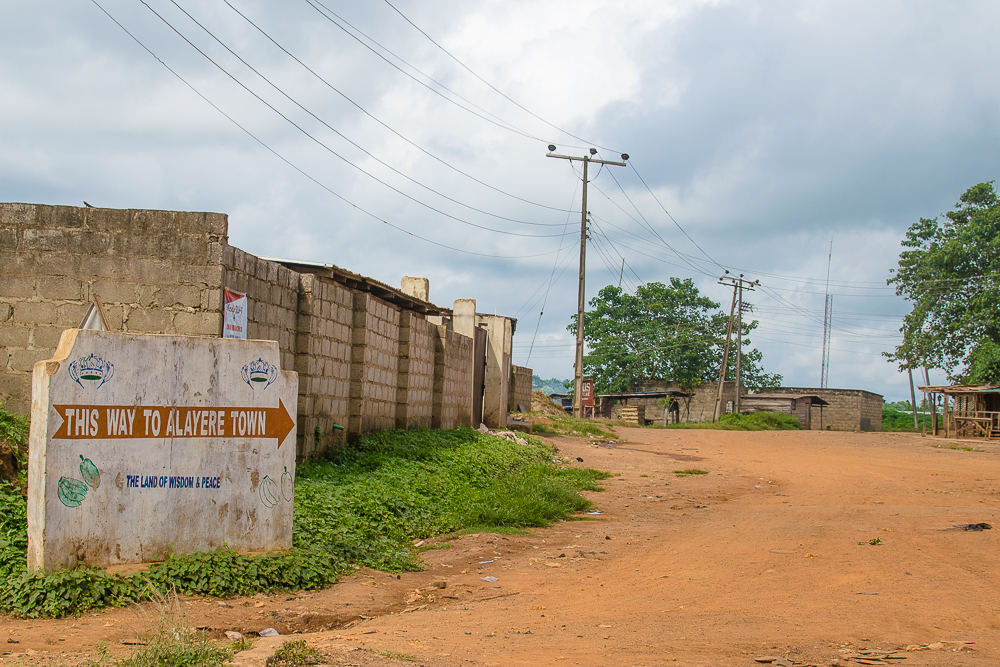
Welcome to Alayere town, Akure, Ondo State

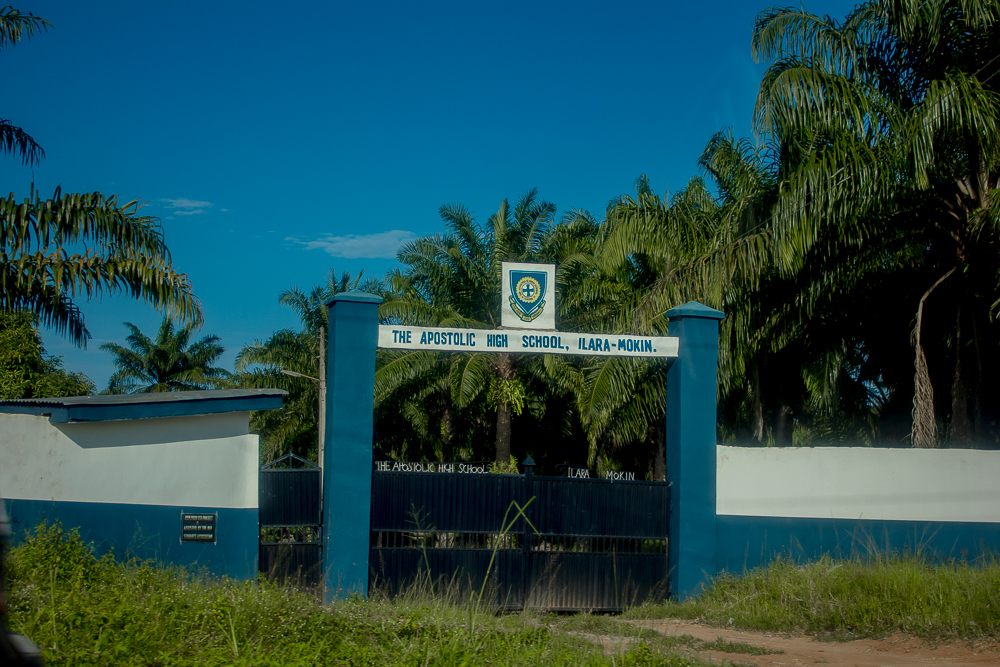
The Apostolic High School, Ilara-Mokin

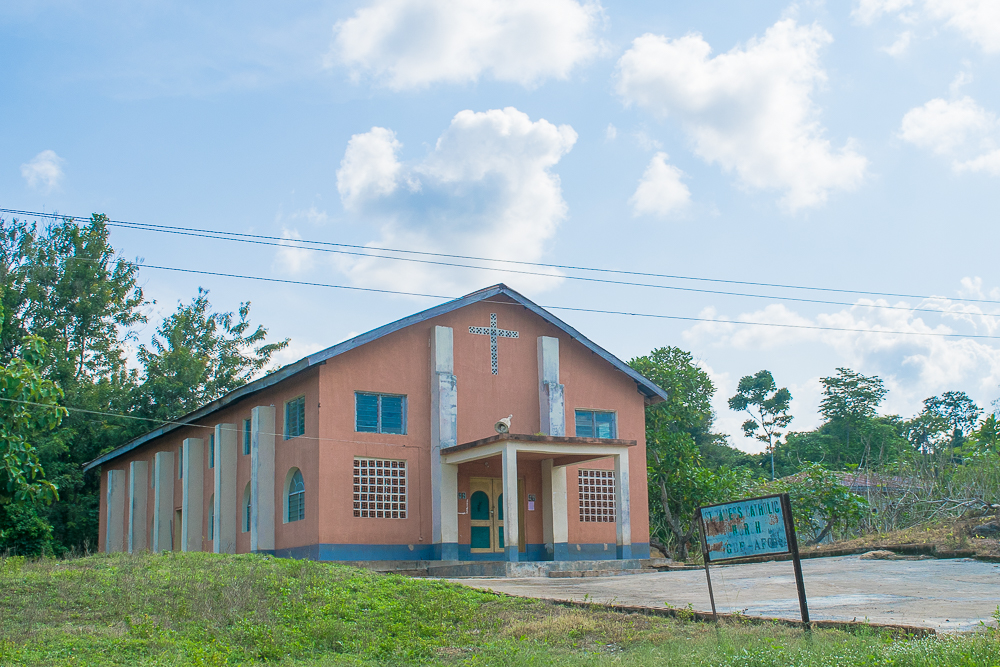
St James Catholic Church, Ugbe-Afo, Ondo State

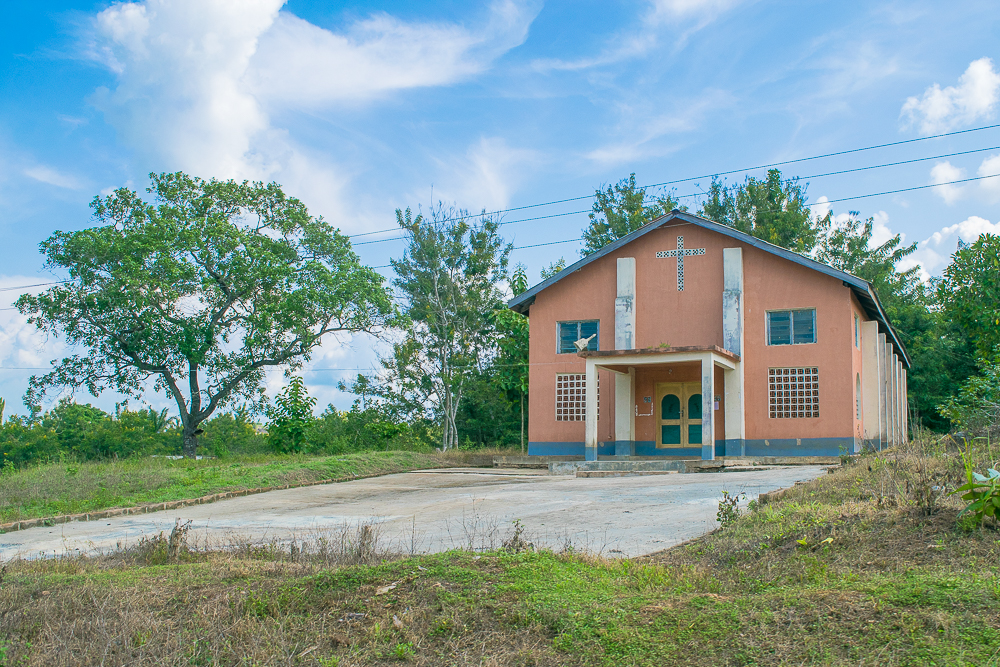
St James Catholic Church, Ugbe-Afo, Ondo State
