= Agbede =

Agbede means "blacksmith" in Yoruba language. The term may also refer to:

== People ==
- Bolaji Agbede, Nigerian businesswoman, banker and corporate executive
- Francis Adefarakanmi Agbede (born 1954), Nigerian and Yoruba businessman
- Oluwole Akinyele Agbede, Nigerian professor

== Other uses ==
- Agbede, Edo State, town in Nigeria
