= Ilara-Mokin =

Ilara-Mokin Ìlárá-Mọ̀kín, Ùláá
- Urban metro
- Nicknames: Ilara, Ùláá
- Location in Nigeria
- Coordinates: 7°20′53″N 5°06′52″E
- Country: Nigeria
- State: Ondo
- LGA: Ifedore

Government
  - Alara: Oba Abiodun Aderemi Adefehinti

Area
  - Total: 32 km^{2} (12 sq mi)

Population
  - Estimate (2019): 45,000
- Time zone: UTC+1 (WAT)
- Climate: Tropical savanna climate (Aw)
- Website: http://www.ilaramokin.org/

Ilara-Mokin (Yoruba: Ìlárá-Mọ̀kín) is located in a central part of Ifedore local government of Ondo State, Nigeria. Ilara-Mokin is about 12 km from Ondo state capital, and has Ipogun, Ipinsa, Ikota, Ibule-Soro and Ero as neighbouring towns.

== History ==
According to oral history, the first Alara (Alaa), or king, of Ilara Mokin was Olutipin Modulua claimed by the people of Ilara to be the same person as Obalufon Alayemore (known in the Ekiti dialect as "Obanifon"), a ruler of Ife between the 14th and 15th centuries, who established many different hamlets before returning to Ile-Ife to rule. Olutipin also a descendant of Olofin Adimula, or Oduduwa. Obalufon and his supporters founded Ilara-Mokin (or at least a settlement known simply as Ilara) after he was deposed from the throne as Ooni of Ife by Oranmiyan. His supporters included several other leaders and priests, whose present descendants serve as religious leaders. In particular, four of these leaders became the leaders of the 4 major clans or groups that make up Ilara-Mokin presently, the Selemo (chief priest of Olofin), Odofin (chief priest of Ore), Alao (chief priest of Obanifon), and Osogbon (chief priest of Olugbo). The first location of Ilara may have been a site near what is now Ifewara, or a site in what is now the Ekiti region, close to other towns believed to have also been founded by Obalufon, like Efon-Alaaye. The people of Aramoko-Ekiti were also among the original inhabitants of Ilara, until they split and migrated north. The people of Igbara-oke and Ijare were also likely among the original inhabitants of Ilara. It is unclear if Ilara-Mokin is that original settlement "Ilara" founded by Obalufon, or if Ilara-Mokin and other towns named Ilara (like Ilara-Remo, Ilara-Epe) are offshoots of that original settlement founded by descendants of Obanifon and his supporters. Regardless, the first settlement of Ilara-Mokin is regarded as Ùpóólé Ara (literally meaning "original homeland.").

Olutipin (Obanifon) is said to have then placed his son Ayajo on the throne before returning to Ile-Ife. In addition, shrines and symbolic representations of their gods (orishas, also called umole in the Ekiti dialect) were also brought from Ife, like Olofin (deified form of Oduduwa), while others were adopted from the indigenous people they encountered such as Ajalemogun. Ayajo also deified his father Obanifon as a god, he is worshipped primarily by the Oke-Ao clan. The people of Ilara-Mokin were constantly moving from their locations because of war, lack of water, and other reasons. One of their settlements was called Ugbó Olíkòló, "the forest that has worms," because the people of Ilara fled that location after worms took over the town and the statue of the god Ajalemogun. The Ilara people migrated to different locations several times before finally settling in their present location in the 1850s as civil wars plagued Yorubaland.

=== Origin of Name ===
Many Yoruba towns are named Ilara or Ara, with unique suffixes to denote the different locations (Ilara-Remo, Ilara-Epe, Aramoko-Ekiti, Ara-Ekiti), all these towns likely originated from the same ancient town ruled by a king known as the Alara. Ilara or Ulara in the Èkìtì dialect comes from a contraction meaning, "ù ní ará" "That whom have relatives/supporters. The "mokin" part of Ilara-Mokin, or mọ ọ̀kín, means "the ones who know the ọ̀kín bird." The phrase was later contracted to " Ìlárá-Mọ̀kín," or "Ùlárá-Mọ̀kín." The word ọ̀kín, now attributed to the peacock in modern days, originally referred to the cattle egret, which was regarded as a royal and prestigious bird because of its pure white feathers. It is often called "Ọba Ẹyẹ," "King of the Birds." It is believed that the ancient Ilara people often fed and lived alongside these egrets. In the current town of Ilara-Mokin, several ancient trees house dozens of nests of these birds.

=== Present location ===
Among the other locations the people of Ilara settled and then migrated through was Otate (or Ọtaáté), in what is now the Akure Forest Reserve (referred to as Ugbó Móòyú, "the forbidden forest,") in the late 18th century. The people of Ilara lived in the forest for many years, until the water dried up. Ọtaáté was regarded as a holy site and the Ọtaáté festival is held every year in May, in which people, led by the Èyé Ulé (the highest ranking women chief), lead a procession following the ancient migration pattern to worship the stone deity that is believed to reside at Ọtaáté, as well as the goddess Láyíore. The festival is determined by the day of the Solanum aethiopicum crop harvest.

After leaving Ọtaáté, the people of Ìlárá under Alaa Ajíperí Ìgodò engaged in several wars, including ones with the town Ile-Oluji, as well as civil wars, causing many Ìlárá people to leave the town. Ajíperí was later killed in one of these wars. During this time, Ilara came under the control of the Akure Kingdom, during Deji Ogoro's campaign through the region in the 1750s. By the early 1800s, the people of Ilara had to move again, largely because of the wider destabilization of Yorubaland by the Yoruba Revolutionary Wars, as well as the Akure-Benin War, which destroyed Akure, causing many of its inhabitants to flee to Ilara. By the 1820s-1830s, the people of Ìlárá split into five nearby settlements in Ugbó Móòyú, Ègùdu, Adigbolu (near what is now the town of Ero), Alagidi, Ọjàjèrè, and Òkè-Ègùrè, under the reign of Alárá Àgbékọ́rùn. By 1845, the people of Ìlárá had regrouped, crossed the Aponmu and Omififun rivers, and moved to their permanent location on top of a hill, which later became the center of the neighborhood Òkè-Òde. At the hill they met the people of Ìjàdó, who welcomed them, and settled their after receiving permission to do so from the Deji of Akure.

Ìlárá continued to be plagued by wars throughout the 19th century until British colonization, and was attacked by the Ibadan army in the 1860s. Many warriors from Ilara-Mokin played a role in the Kiriji War, and Ilara-Mokin allegedly served as the headquarters for the spy unit of the Ekiti-Parapo army.

=== Clans ===
The town originally consisted of four groups that came from Ife with the first Alara, Olutipin. Over time, many migrants as well as the indigenous people they encountered in their new locations joined these clans. The people of Ìjàdó, who lived in the present location of Ilara-Mokin before subsequently being absorbed by the new arrivals, joined the Òkè-Òde group, but still maintain their own chief, the Ajagun, and their traditions. Each of the four historical groups live in distinct areas in modern Ilara-Mokin. Each of the groups is led by one or a series of chiefs, and also has a unique praise poetry, or oriki.

==== Òkè-Òde ====
- The first group are the Òkè-Òde, also known as the Ìàrẹ or Ùjàgbà. This is the largest group. The Oke-Ode people are regarded as the main custodians of the religious and cultural heritage of Ilara-Mokin, as most of the priests and supporters that migrated with the king come from this group. The Ìàrẹ refer to a class of chiefs that many families in Oke-Ode contain. They serve as the members of council of kingmakers who elect the new king as well as the priests who uphold the rituals of the Yoruba religion and the worship of the umole (deities). In the original settlement of Ilara, the neighborhood these people originated from was regarded as Ùjàgbà, or Ùjàgbàmẹkùn. Upon settling in the present location of Ilara, they settled on the top of the hill, and thus were known as "Oke-Ode" (Hill of the town). Most of the new migrants that came to settle in Ilara-Mokin often were absorbed by this group, including the indigenous people, the people of Ìjàdó, that lived in the present location that Ilara-Mokin is in. The leader of this group is known as Lísà (Ọísà) is the highest ranking chief in the town and second-in-command to the king is the leader of this section. Other high-ranking chiefs from this section include the Sẹ́lẹmọ (the chief priest of Ilara-Mokin), Ọlotin (the priest of the deity Olofin), Aro (chief priest of the highest ranking deity, Ajalemogun), Oisikin/Ologun-Sikin (highest ranking warrior), Obaala (a noble title), Ologun-Legiri (head of the Egiri/Iledo, the local police force, and priest of the deity Oyire), and the Edinmo. A majority of the female chieftaincy titles are also held by members of this group, including Èyé Ulé (highest ranking woman chief), Èyé Ọlúalórò (a priestess of the Olofin), and Èyé Àṣàmọ
- The Ùrò or Òkè-Ùrò group in Ìlárá is occasionally regarded as a unique group, but almost all of its members are Òkè-Òde people who moved as the town grew large in the 1890s.

==== Odò-Ùgbèyìn ====
- Odò-Ùgbèyìn, meaning "River at the edge of the town," is named after the neighborhood the people of Odò-Ùgbèyìn originated from in the first settlement of Ilara-Mokin. Odò-Ùgbèyìn is the group the Alara (the king) and the royal lineage belong to. As such, any Alárá, or king of the town must come from this unit. The leading chief of the section is the Ọ̀ṣọgbọ́n (the assistant and right-hand man of the king). The Ọ̀ṣọgbọ́n is also the priest of Olugbo, an ancient king of Ilara-Mokin who was deified after his death.

==== Ùdọ̀fin ====
- Ùdọ̀fin or Ìdọ̀fin is one of two of the smaller clans of Ilara-Mokin, along with Òkè-Àọ̀. Like Òkè-Àọ̀, the people of Ùdọ̀fin are closely linked with the Òkè-Òde, and almost all its present members have Òkè-Òde ancestry. The Ọ̀dọ̀fin is the head of this group, and is the second highest ranking chief after the Lísà of Òkè-Òde. The Ọ̀dọ̀fin's primary role is to serve as the chief priest of the god Ọrẹ̀, a fertility deity brought from Ifẹ̀ and believed to control the weather. The Ọrẹ̀ festival was traditionally held during the first week of May to offer sacrifices to Ọrẹ̀ so that rains that would not destroy the town. Ọrẹ̀ is linked to the ancient Ifẹ̀ hunter Ọrẹ̀lúéré, a hunter who was a key supporter of Oduduwa against Obatala. The people of Ùdọ̀fin claim descent from Ọrẹ̀'s supporters and descendants who left Ifẹ̀ with the other people of Ìlárá.

==== Òkè-Àọ̀ ====
- The fourth section is known as Òkè-Àọ̀ (or Ìlawọ̀). Òkè-Àọ̀ like Ùdọ̀fin, is closely linked with Òkè-Òde, and most of its residents have intermarried with the Òkè-Òde. The Aláọ̀ is the head of Òkè-Àọ̀. The Aláọ̀, and by the extension his family and his clan, are the main custodians of the worship of Ọbànìfọ̀n, the royal ancestor and founder of Ìlárá-Mọ̀kín who was deified upon his death. Ọbànìfọ̀n's shrine is within the confines of the Òkè-Àọ̀ neighborhood, and the festival is primarily performed by members of the Aláọ̀ lineage. The people of Òkè-Àọ̀ are unique in that many of them have names referring to Ọbànìfọ̀n (see names like Ọnìfọ̀nṣaè, Ọnìfọ̀nbóyèdé). Other chiefs of Òkè-Àọ̀ include the Ọísà Àọ̀ and the Ọjọmu.

== Traditional festivals ==
The people of Ilara Mokin celebrate many festivals. The first one is Mokin Day, which takes place in the month of November.

Next is "Ọdun Ùjuṣu" or "Ujesu" which translates as Holiday of Eating Yam, which celebrates a successful harvest. This is the most significant and important. festival in Ilara-Mokin. It is celebrated in the first week of September. It is referred as "Ìjẹṣu" because the major crop grown as sold are Yams (uṣu), and it is also a staple food. The annual festival season of Ilara-Mokin starts in July. Priestesses of the river deities Osun and Olokun hold their annual festival, known as ọdún Èyé Káàrè or ọdún Olómi, consisting of offerings and singing alongside the rivers known as Etí-àgbo and Etí-ụmọlẹ̀ Ọlọ́tín.

Next, the high chiefs and practitioners of the Yoruba religion will perform Ìjobì, in which kola nuts are offered to various deities and ancestors.

As August approaches, the festival known as Aérégbé is celebrated. The Aérégbé festival is a festival celebrated by almost every town surrounding Ilara-Mokin, such as Akure, Igbara-oke, and Ondo City. During Aérégbé, sacrifices and prayers are offered to the deity known as Ọlúa, and akara is widely consumed. During Aérégbé, the woman chief known as the Eléréègè performs a dance known as the ègè with virgin girls, as a display of female beauty, femininity, purity, and virginity. It is usually strictly closed off to non-indigenes.

As Aérégbé ends, with about four days till the main festival, the drumming of the wooden drum known as the apoporo happens every night. The elders of the town begin to hold secret meetings preparing for the festival, and thus signals the start of the Yam festival of Ilara-Mokin.

The people of Ilara are known as "ọmọ a kórò mẹ́fà lọ́rìjọ́" the ones who do six rituals in one day. Each of these six rituals of the Yam festival are regarded as extremely important as they are said to appease the many deities of Ìlárá-Mọ̀kín as well as to show thanks for a successful year. The festival lasts for nine days.

The àgbá drum will begin to drummed at around 4am on the morning of Ùjẹṣu, signifying the festival is starting. The first ritual one is known as Ìkọ̀sẹ̀-ọ̀ụ́rọ̀ (literally "the act of paying homage in the morning") consists of "ụ̀bà," paying homage to the deities and ancestors, known as ụmọlẹ̀, of Ìlárá-Mọ̀kín early in the morning. The two main sections of Ìlárá, Òkè-Òde and Odò-Ùgbèyìn perform their own required rites, in addition to the six town-wide rituals. The elders of Oke-Ode will go to the shrine of the ancestral deity of Ilara-Mokin, Ọlọ́fin, and offer prayers and sacrifices, while the chiefs of Odo-Ugbeyin will offer sacrifices to the resting places of three ancient kings of Ilara, Eyinmirin, Itakiki, and Olugbo, who represent the ancestors of all subsequent kings of Ilara.

The king, representing the Ugbeyin quarter, will go to the farm, known as Oko-Idáṣu, and offer prayers to the ancestors of Ilara-Mokin as well as uprooting and harvesting the first yam. Then, the second ritual starts, Òbèrèmóyè, consisting of intense dancing and whipping contests among both young and old men, another way of showing thanks and joy to the gods for a new harvest. The King then appears to the public and offers prayers and blessings to the people. Traditionally, the king was rarely seen in public so this was an extremely important event.

As Òbèrèmóyè ends in the evening, the Òkè-Òde quarter takes over and begins the third ritual around dusk, known as Àgògo, which honors a fertility deity known as Àgògo. Dancing and drum usually takes place during this time, and traditionally, the king goes out to greet the people and offer prayers. Àgògo is quickly followed by the fourth ritual, Olóyeré, a ritual for the deity known as Olóyeré. During this time, the festival is known as àrìsùn (literally "not sleeping,") and is regarded as an all-night vigil. In the night, young people will beat the drum apoporo, while others will perform a rite known as Ajuná, where bonfires are made and young men dancing with bundles of flaming sticks on their heads.

After Olóyeré, people return to their homes where the mothers of the town begin the ritual of Àṣàṣagboro, in which freshly harvested yams are pounded and eaten all night long. During this time the traditional poetry known as alámọ̀ (similar to oriki) is performed throughout the night, consisting of singing praising the ancestors of Ilara-Mokin.

During midnight, the chief known as the Ọlọ́tín, the Sẹ́lẹ́mọ (the chief priest of Ọlọ́fin), and elders of the town go to the forest in the middle of the town, known as the Ugbó umọlẹ̀ (forest of the deity), a place strictly off guards to non-initiated members of the town. During this time, the chant "Ògbèrè kóò," meaning "stranger leave," is repeatedly chanted, serving as a warning and also a rallying cry. A large statue of the deity, Ọlọ́fin is brought from the forest and carried by the Ọlọ́tin, and is brought forth to the public, with dancing and drumming in the early morning to a hill, thus the fifth ritual, known as Òkè, is completed.

Finally, in the morning, the final key ritual is performed, Ìyèrè-kéèkè, consisting of a final finale of dancing and singing. Thus, the Ùjẹṣu festival is completed.

Three days later, the festival Àrìwowo, performed only by the Oke-Ode people, pays homage to strictly the ancestors of the Oke-Ode people. This is then followed by the Porowínyìn festival six days later. On the fifteen day, the festival known as Oríkádún (literally meaning "another year is survived"), consists of more whipping contests, prayers, and thanks.

Another festival is known as Àjàlémògún in honor of the deity Àjàlémògún, the ancient deity of Ilara-Mokin that has played a central role in the legendary history of the town. Unlike other deities like Olofin, or Obanifon, it is believed that Ajalemogun is indigenous to the land the people of the town currently reside in and thus is associated with the very existence of Ilara. Ajalemogun is represented by an extremely tall figurine, carried by the chief known as the Aro. The festival was traditionally done every five or ten years. The festival was done to appease the deity and bring peace, joy, and prosperity to the land. The last Ajalemogun festival was on February 20, 1991, and has not been done since. Many reasons include a lack of funds to sponsor the festival, as well as a lack of support by the current king because of his Evangelical Christianity As of 2024, the first Àjàlémògún festival in 34 years is planned to be held in February 2025

Many people from Ilara still practice the traditional Yoruba religion, and thus have the Ogun Festival in September, as well as familial festivals.

== Language ==
The people of Ilara-Mokin speak the Ekiti dialect of Yoruba, most similar to the language of Akure, and Igbara-oke, and some closeness to the Ado-Ekiti dialect.

== Administration ==
Ilara-Mokin is ruled by the Alara (king). The current king is Oba Abiodun Aderemi Adefehinti, Agbekorun II, who has been ruling since 17 July 1998, after succeeding Alara Solomon Ojopagogo, Adeyeye II. Surrounding him is a cabinet a chiefs (Olóyè), known as Ìàrẹ. The highest six of these Ìàrẹ are known as the Ìàrẹ̀fà (Iwarefa). While the monarchy and royal family come from the Odo-Ugbeyin quarter of Ilara-Mokin, most of the chiefs and custodians of tradition are from the Oke-Ode section. The kingmakers of Ilara-Mokin consist of nine chiefs.

There are also chiefs that represent the hunters, farmers, and blacksmiths.

== Geography ==
Ilara Mokin is a fertile rich grassland and forest. It is surrounded to the north by the towns of Igbara Oke and Ero. To the south includes the towns of Isarun, Ikota, Ibule Soro, and a few miles, the Ondo State capital Akure.

== Education ==
=== Primary and secondary education ===
- St. Michael Primary School
- The Apostolic High School
- Muslim Primary School
- Muslim Comprehensive High School
- St. Andrew's Primary School
- St. Joseph's Primary School
- The Apostolic Primary School
- Community Comprehensive High School

=== Universities and colleges ===
- Public Service Training Institute
- Elizade University

== Media ==
=== Radio ===
- Adaba FM

== Notable people ==
- Wahab Adegbenro (1955 - 2020), Nigerian physician and Ondo State Commissioner of Health
- Dele Ojo (1938 – 2018), Nigerian musician and performer, who was a prominent performer within the Juju music genre

== Photo gallery of Ilara Mokin ==
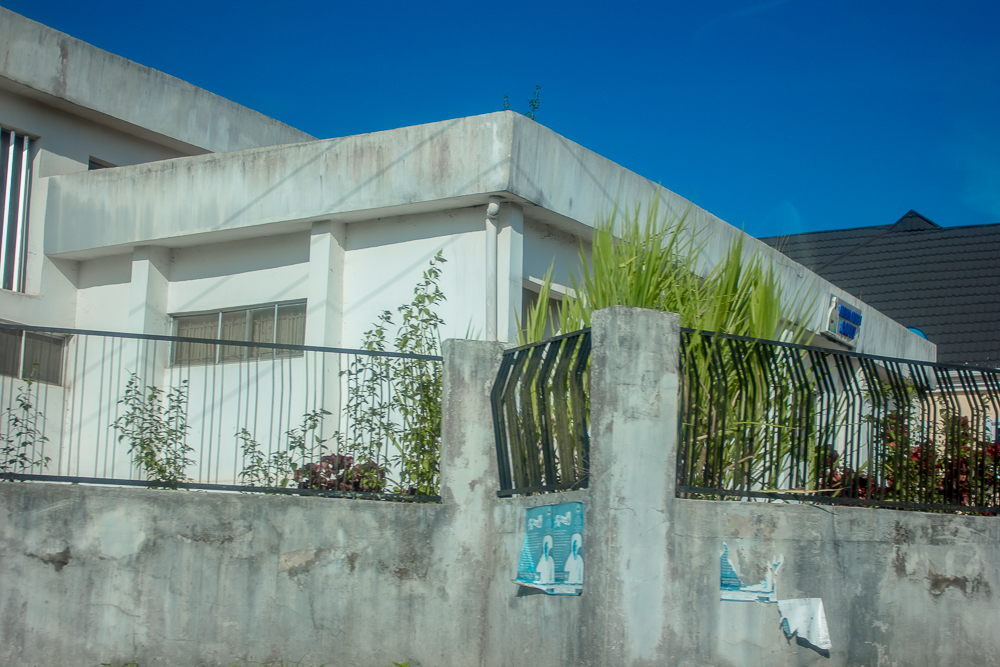

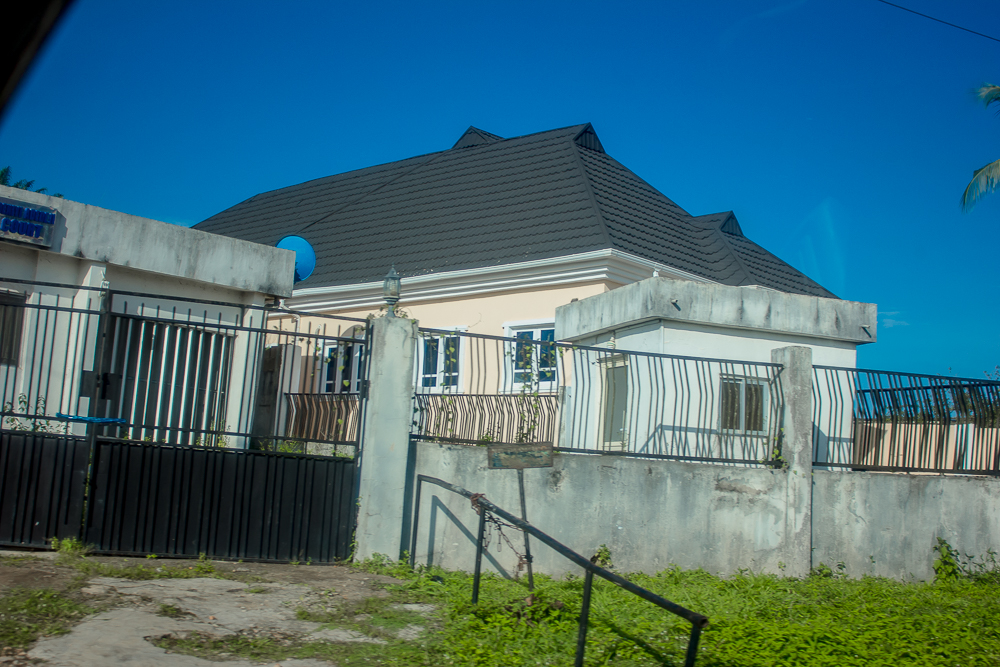

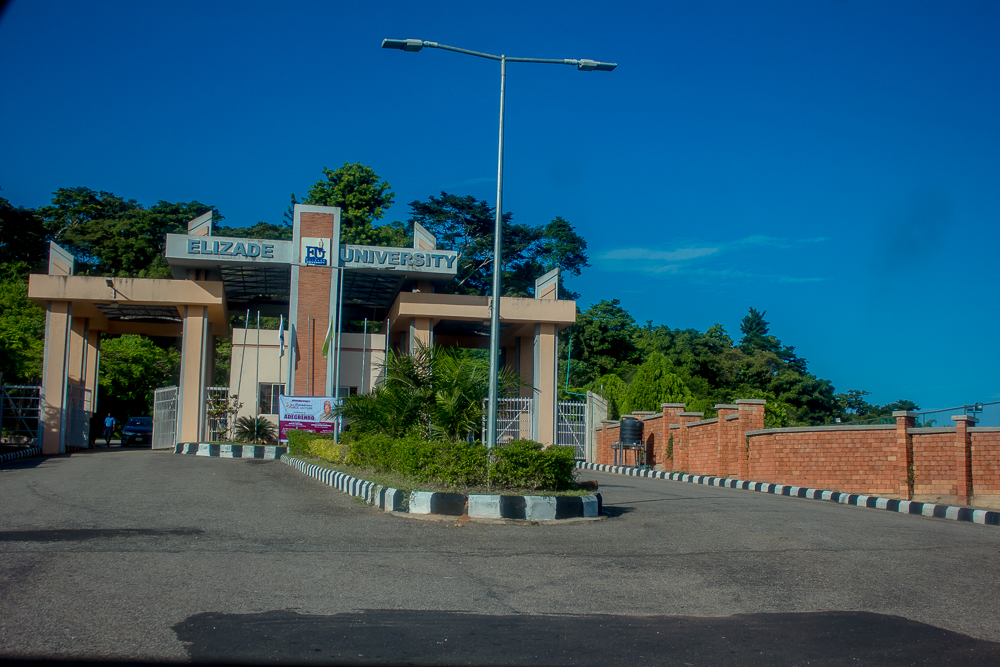

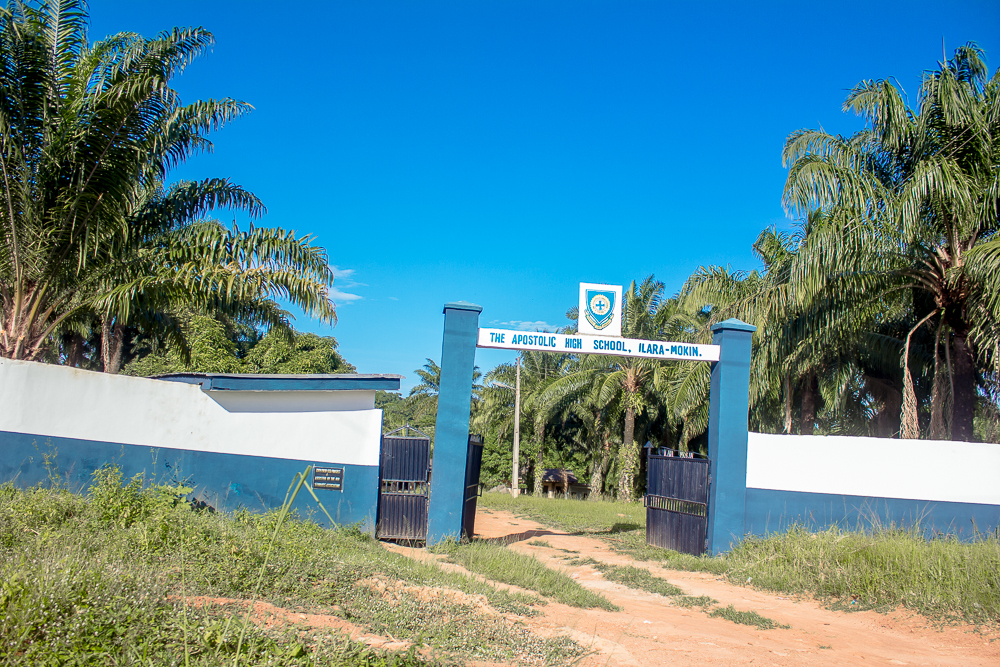

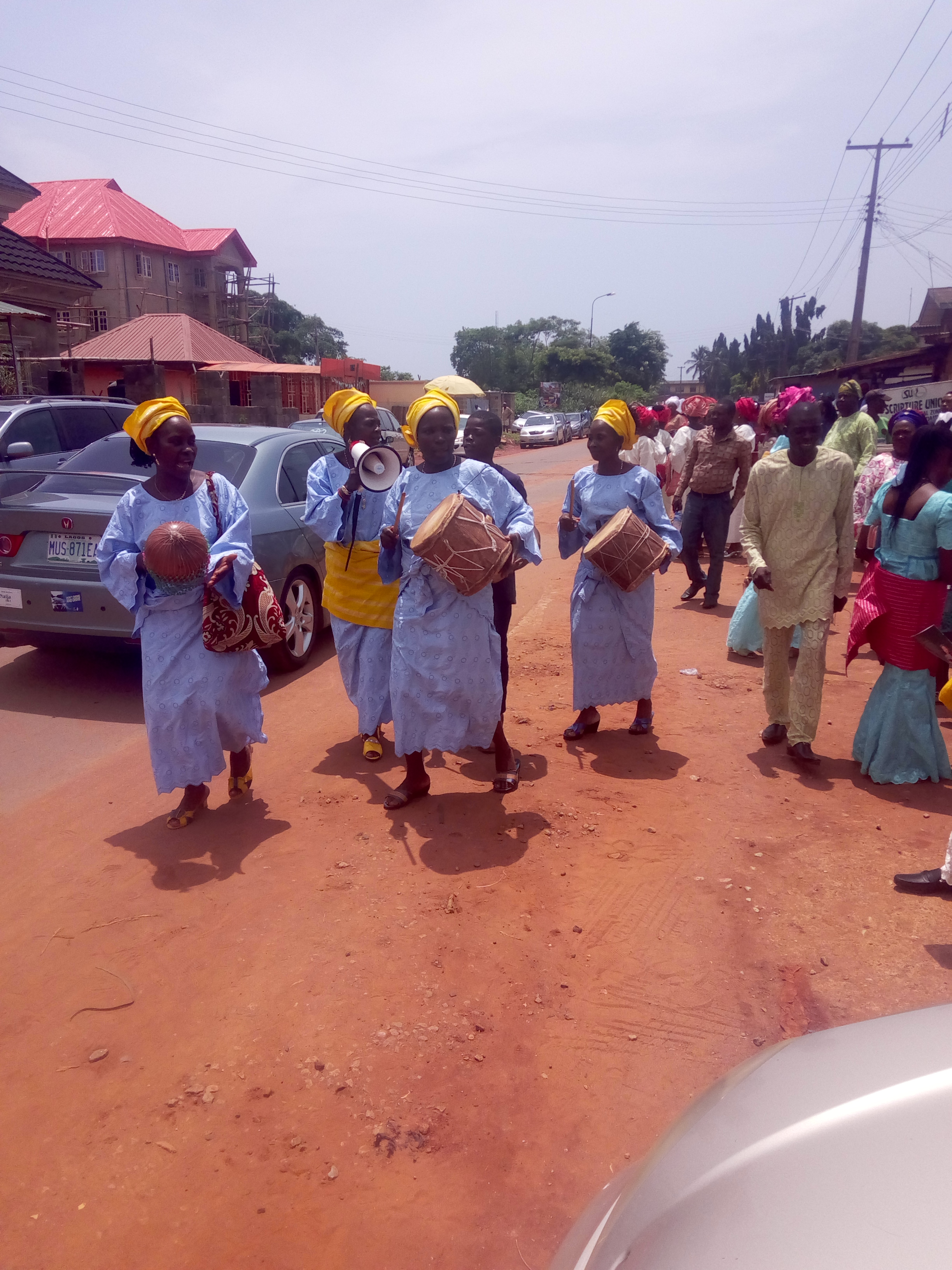

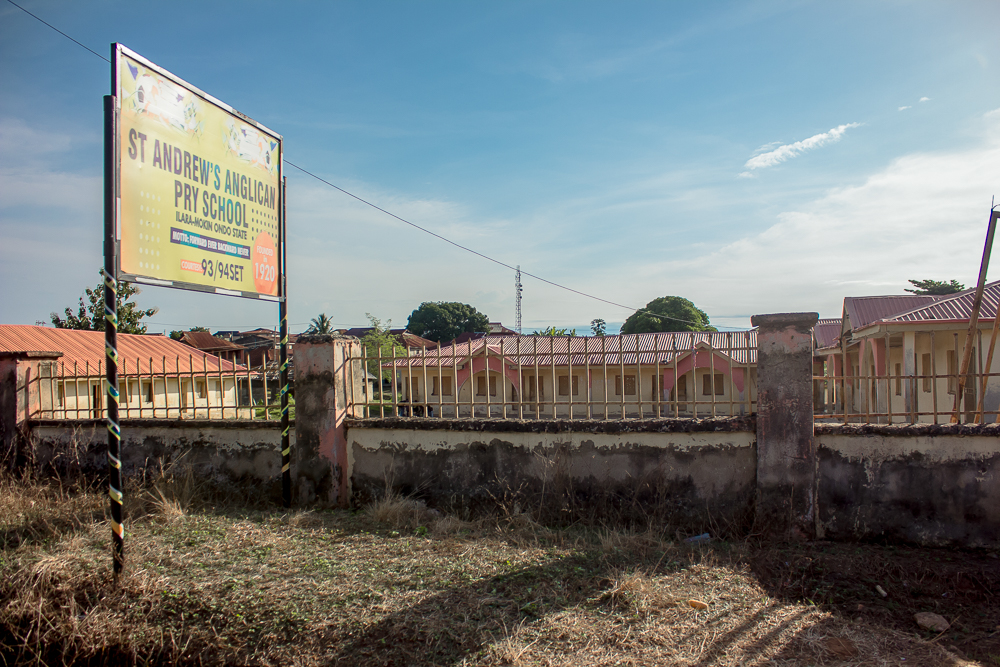

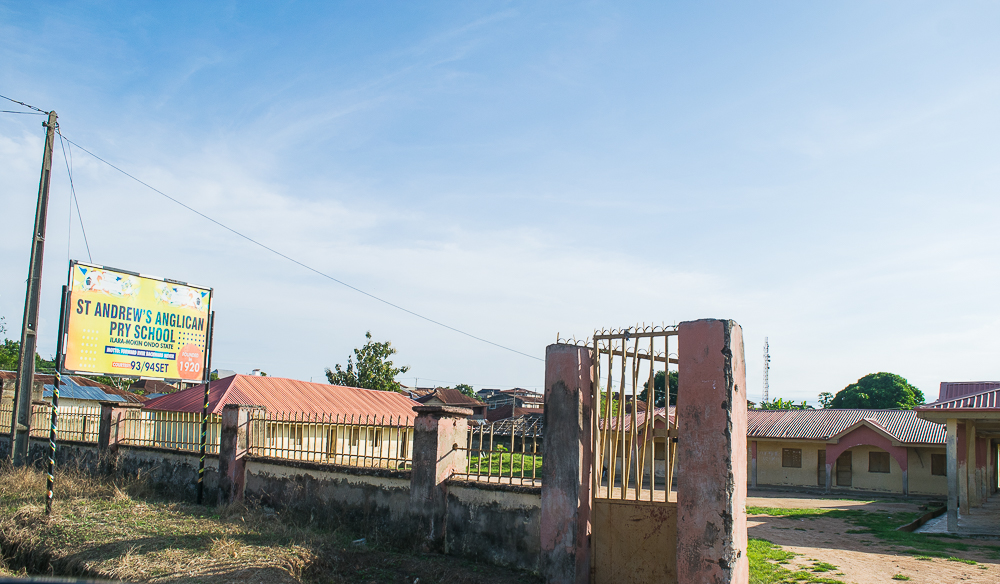
St Andrews Anglican Primary School, Ilara Mokin
