= Dele Ojo =

Nigerian musician and singer-songwriter (1938-2018)

- Also known as: Terena
- Born: James Ogundele Ojo; 10 July 1938; Ilara-Mokin, Ondo State, Nigeria
- Died: 3 May 2018 (aged 79)
- Genres: Afrobeat, Jazz, Highlife
- Occupations: singer-songwriter, musician, minister, teacher
- Instruments: Trumpet, bass guitar
- Years active: 1969-2016

Dele Ojo (10 July 1938 – 3 May 2018) was a Nigerian musician and performer. He is revered as one of the musicians to have spread and popularized the Jùjú genre of music.

== Early life ==
James Ogundele Ojo was born on 10 July 1938 in the village of Ilara-Mokin as the only child of Òjó-ọya and his wife. He came from a family of devout practitioners of the Yoruba religion. His father was a worshipper of the Yoruba deity Ogun, and thus was given the name Ogundele, meaning "Ogun has arrived home." His parents later converted to Christianity, and he was given the name James. His mother was from the town of Ikere-Ekiti. His father Ojooya was born as the youngest of the six children of Chief Ọ̀ṣúnrẹ̀mádé "Osunre", and her husband Obasanya. Osunre who was a worshipper of the water deity Olokun and Oshun, and was a titled chief, she held the title "Eye Oduno," in Ilara-Mokin. Ojo-oya's father Obasanya died when he was young and his mother remarried a man named Atiko, who had two more daughters with Osunre. Osunre was born into a family of Ifa religion and Ogun worshippers, she was the third child of Aóòláè, a babalawo who was the Obaala of Ilara-Mokin, and his second wife, Ifalọ̀úrọ̀, an Olókun priestess who bore the title of Elerege. The Elerege is the head of an annual festival that celebrates the sacredness of womanhood, virginity, and honors the deity Olúa. Osunre was a younger half-sister to the Kiriji War veteran Igodan ajabi elewa, who fought with the warrior Ogedengbe of Ilesa. Ifalouro, Dele Ojo's great-grandmother, was from the town of Igbara-oke. She also held the title "Eye Oduno," and was born to the family of the Obaala of Igbara-Oke, and had roots in the town of Akure.

== Education ==
He attended St. Michael's Primary School from 1944 to 1955. As a fresh primary school student in 1952, Dele was taught how to use a typewriter through the sponsorship of his father. In 1954, he secured a job as a clerk but resigned after three months before he was given another job as a local school teacher.

== Career ==
Ojo's music career began when he met Victor Olaiya who employed him as a member of his music band. In 1969, Ojo formed a band called "Dele Ojo & His Star Brothers" after Olaiya had disbanded his group. Ojo and his group started recording and performing songs to massive reception in live shows in Ekiti State, Lagos and Osun State. They also toured several cities in the United States of America.

He died on 3 May 2018 at his hometown of Ilara Mokin in Ondo State at the age of 79.

== Selected discography ==
- Alafia
- Juju Music at Its Best
