= Ekiti people =

Sub-group of the Yorubas of West Africa

Èkìtì
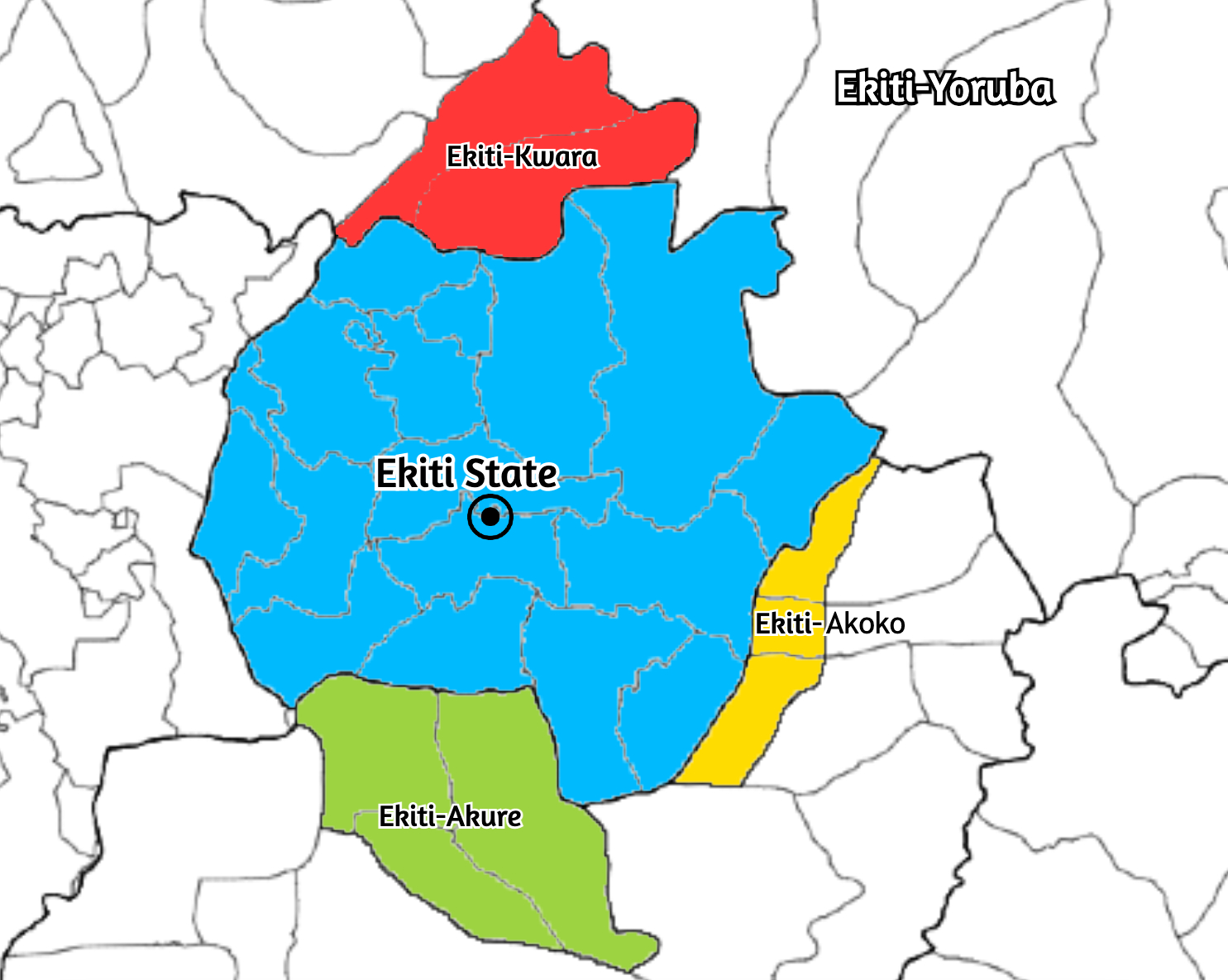
- Territorial expanse of The Ekiti Yorubas.

Total population
- ~ 4,175,608 (2011—'16)

Regions with significant populations
- Ekiti State - 3,270,798 (2016) ____________; Ondo State; Estimated: >775,420 Akure North — 151,930; Akure South — 418,570; Ifedore — 204,920; Akoko North West ____________; Kwara State; Estimated: 129,390 Ekiti LGA — 63,200; Oke Ero — 66,190

Religion
- Primarily: Christianity; Also: Islam • Yoruba religion

Related ethnic groups
- Ìjẹ̀shà, Ifẹ̀, Ìgbómìnà, Àkókó, Yàgbà, Ondó, Other Yoruba people

The Ekiti people are one of the largest historical subgroups of the larger Yoruba people of West Africa, located in Nigeria. They are classified as a Central Yoruba group, alongside the Ijesha, Igbomina, YàgbàEkiti and Ifes. Ekiti State is populated exclusively by Ekiti people; however, it is but a segment of the historic territorial domain of Ekiti-speaking groups, which historically included towns in Ondo State such as Akure (the current capital and largest city of Ondo State), Ilara-Mokin, Ijare, and Igbara-oke. Ogbagi, Irun, Ese, Oyin, Igasi, Afin and Eriti in the Akoko region, as well as some towns in Kwara State and Kogi State, are also culturally Ekiti, although belong in other states today.

The name Ekiti is a derivation of an earlier term, Okiti, which means "Hilly" in Yoruba, as characterized by the generally hilly terrain of the areas which the Ekiti inhabit.

== Dialect ==
The language commonly spoken by the Ekiti people is a distinct Yoruba dialect also named 'Ekiti'. Despite its comparatively large geographical spread, Ekiti remains relatively uniform within the areas where it is spoken. The dialect generally has similarities with Ijesha speech towards the west beyond the Effon ridge, and into Igbomina in the north and northwest around the Ekiti speaking people of Ekan meje and Iloffa towards Omu Aran, both of which still fall within the Central Yoruba Continuum. Towards the northeast, away from the town of Ipao, Iyemero, Oke ako, Itapaji, Irele and Omuo, the dialect gradually fades into the Yagba Ekiti Yoruba types respectively.

== Geography ==
The Èkìtì cover an area of 8,557 km², and are culturally bound by the Igbomina to the north and the Ijeshas to the west (the traditional Èkìtì-Ijesha cultural boundary being at Ipetu-Ijesha). The Ondos are located to the southwest, the Owos to the southeast, and the Akokos, YàgbàEkiti and Ijumus to the northeast.

Èkìtì State is generally an upland zone, with elevations being generally above 450m throughout. Around Akure, elevations drop to around 360m. It lies on an area underlain by metamorphic rock, and is generally an undulating country with a characteristic landscape that consists of old plains broken by steep-sided outcrops that may occur singularly or in groups or ridges. Such outcrops can be seen in places at Aramoko, Efon-Alaiye, Ikere-Ekiti, Ogotun-Ekiti and Okemesi-Ekiti among others. Rugged hills dot the landscape, notable among which are the Olosunta hills of Ikere-Ekiti in the south, Effon ridge which runs longitudinally around Efon-Alaiye on the western boundary, and Ado Hills in the centre. The topography was perhaps the single strongest reason why the Ekitis never became a single unit politically. The area enjoys a tropical climate with two distinct seasons, these are the rainy season - which lasts from April to October - and the dry season which commences in late November and ends in March. Temperature ranges between 21 °C and 28 °C with high humidity. In the South, the vegetation is primarily Tropical hardwood forest, while a mixed/derived type savannah can be observed in the northern peripheries.

== Local administration and population ==
After 1854, Akure and other Ekiti towns came under the rule of Ibadan and many settlements were destroyed. This lasted until a rebellion in 1876 followed by a prolonged war between the Yoruba states, in which the Ekitis combined forces with the Ijeshas and some Akoko towns as a clan confederation known as the Ekiti Parapo to resist Ibadan rule, led by Chief Fabunmi of Oke-Imesi and Chief Ogedengbe of Ijeshaland.

Towards the end of the 19th century, the British, based on their Lagos Colony, had established a protectorate over the area, although they ruled through "native" administrations. They sought to combine the Ekiti kingdoms of the region into a single administrative unit against resistance by the Ekiti people, who preferred local autonomy. In 1899, Ekiti and Ilesha formed the north-eastern division of the protectorate. In 1915, Ekiti, Owo and Ondo were combined to form the Ondo Province with headquarters at Akure.

In looking at the creation of Native Authorities at Oke-Imo, Ilesa in 1900 by Major Reeve Tucker and the re-organization of North East District in December, 1912; the separation of Ijesa, Ekiti and other areas on 1 January 1913, and the creation of Ekiti Native Authority with its headquarters at Ado-Ekiti, conflicts and agitations for local autonomy had pervaded politics of traditional institutions in Ekitiland. When the British moved their administrative centre for Ekiti District to Ado-Ekiti in 1913 where the Ewi holds sway, the change in political status of Ado-Ekiti spurred a desire in other traditional authorities across Ekitiland to further demand for local autonomies. The heightened struggle did not give credibility to the fact that Ado-Ekiti which was eventually picked was already the official and major administrative capital of Ekitiland since 1 January 1913, nor did it occur to the agitators that it had over time become a second home for all Ekiti people irrespective of their hometown or place of origin. Hence, the struggle for relevance and supremacy which continued to rear its head is worth a fuller study and understanding is required if lasting solutions are to be found.

In a similar vein, when the British mooted the idea of recognizing a paramount ruler for Ekitiland; as it did in Ijebu and Egbaland where the Awujale and the Alake became paramount rulers; its agents faced resistance from Ekiti Obas who opposed the mode of listing and role of traditional rulers at Oke-Imo meetings. The attempt by the British colonists to impose a sole native authority in Ekitiland in pursuit of their indirect rule policy failed because of the rejection of the supremacy theory among Ekiti Obas. Every attempt to further centralize traditional political authorities under the Ewi of Ado-Ekiti with Ado-Ekiti as the capital of Ekitiland, despite the ingenuity of its experimentation, was also resisted. The creation of colonial territories - which transformed into modern states after the various colonial interests left Africa - resulted in the division of existing traditional communities. Ondo Province later became part of Western State. In 1976, the old Ondo State was formed and in 1996, Ekiti State was split off from the modern Ondo State, which has Akure as its capital.

== History ==
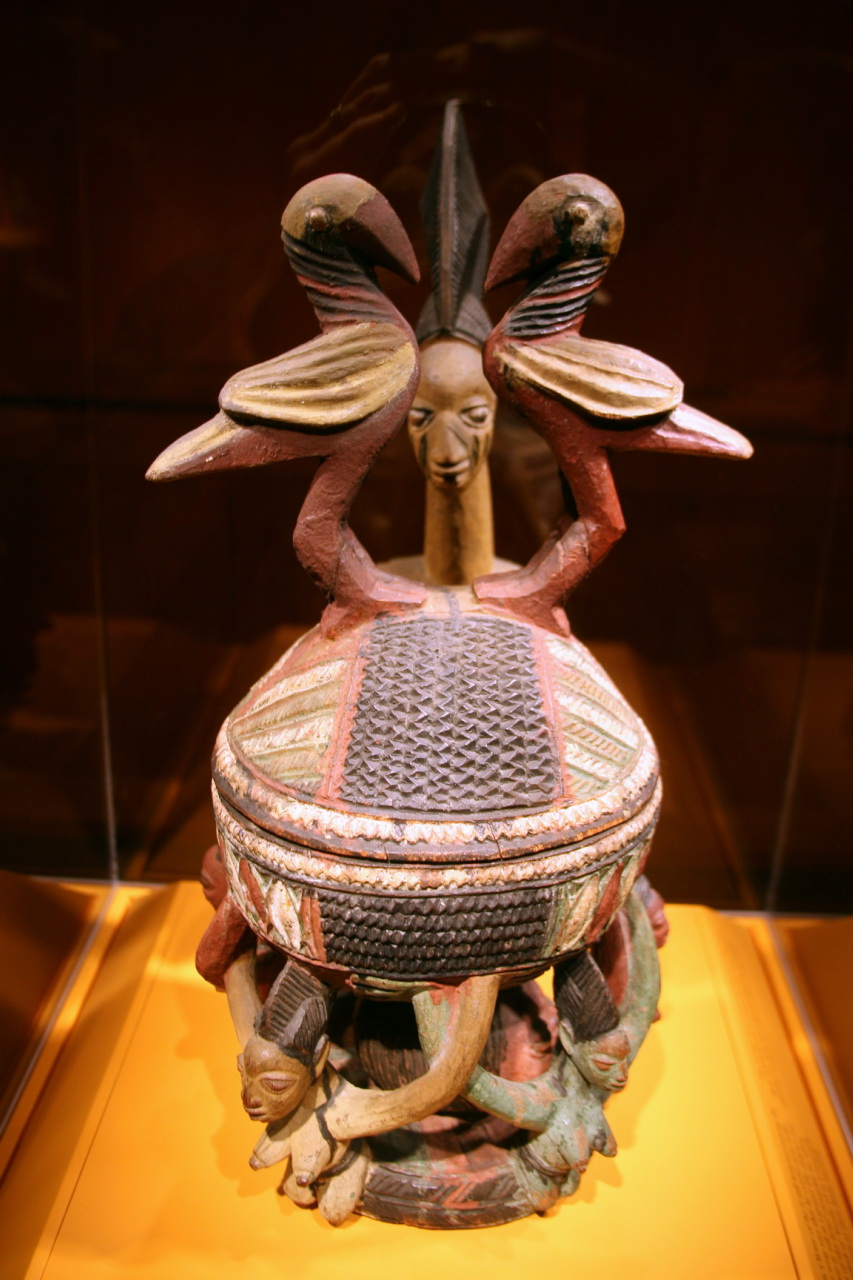
Yoruba bowl from the Ekiti cultural area

Ekiti State was created on 1 October 1996 alongside five other states by the Head of State and Commander-in-Chief of the Armed Forces of the Federal Republic of Nigeria, General Sani Abacha, GCON in a nation-wide broadcast to mark the 36th Independence anniversary of Nigeria. The State, carved out of Ondo State, covers the former twelve local government areas that made up the Ekiti Zone of old Ondo State. Ekiti as a nation within the Yoruba ethnicity has her progenitor in Oduduwa, as do most of the other major sub-ethnic divisions in Yorubaland. However, unlike the more centralized kingdoms and city-states to the West, the Ekitis traditionally lived in smaller, less politically centralized kingdoms that were largely independent of one another, although they traded amongst themselves and their ruling families often contracted dynastic marriages.

The boundary of modern Ekitiland was shifted several times within a spate of 23 years without regard for the existing practice for identifying traditional boundaries in the African traditional society. Some of the major Ekiti settlements affected by the shift in boundaries for political and administrative purposes are as follows:

Ekiti settlements transferred to Northern Nigeria in the colonial era.

- Otun (Awtun) Kingdom - Otun, Ekan, Aaye Ekan, Iloffa, , Idofin, Ilale, Erinmope, Ipetu, Orota, Ola.
- Obbo (Obo) Kingdom (which consist of Obbo-ile and Obbo-Aiyegunle)- Osi, Ora Aiyetoro, Ejiu.
- Omuo-Ekiti and its neighbors - Omuo, Oyin, Iro, Afin, parts of Egbe oba Kingdom.
- Eka Community - Erinmope Ekiti, Aare Opin, Isolo Opin, Isare Opin, Osi, Ikerin Opin, Oke Opin, Epe Opin, Owaatun Opin, Etan, Obbo-Ayegunle, Obbo-Ile, Eruku, Ajuba, Isapa, Ejiu and others

• YAGBA Communities - Odo ere,Egbe,Isanlu,Mopa,Ife olukotun,Oke ere, Ogbe, ponyan, Ayede amuro, Igbagun, Odo ara, Ejiba,Ejuku,Iddo ijesha,Koro,Okunran, Okoloke,Ijowa,Ilai and more.

Ekiti settlements transferred to the Ondo and Owo regions under colonial Nigeria.

- Akure - Akure Kingdom, Iju, Itaogbolu, Igbara Oke, Ijare, Ilara-Mokin, Ibule etc.
- Akoko West - Irun, Ogbagi, Ese, Eriti.

Ekiti used to exist as sixteen principal kingdoms. Each had a senior Oba superintending over its territory. There was never a centralized single political unit among the Ekiti people. Even though the Oore of Otun Ekiti - a town to the north of the Ekiti cultural area - was considered the most senior of the Ekiti kings from the advent of the British occupation of Ekitiland to the later end of Nigeria's colonial rule, the senior Ekiti Obas of Akure (Deji), Ado (Ewi) and Ikere (Ogoga) presided over the largest towns, and Akure was the Ekiti town with the closest links to Benin.

=== The Atolagbe school ===
The view of a section of Ekiti historians (such as Atolagbe) is that the pre-eminence of the Oore as the most senior Yoruba and Ekiti Oba was linked to the fact that the Oore signed the 1886 peace treaty which the British coordinated with the Alaafin of Oyo and the Owa Obokun of Ijeshaland, among others. The Oba of Benin was also made to enter into a treaty with the Alaafin of Oyo. Under this treaty, Ekiti, Ondo and Edo were considered part of his traditional areas of influence and would be free of Oyo territorial incursions, while the Alaafin of Oyo would have the Western and Northern Yoruba territories, including parts of the non-Yoruba speaking neighbours like the Nupe, Ibariba and Aja in Dahomey (now the Republic of Benin). Samuel Rowe, the Governor of the Gold Coast Colony, documented some useful hints concerning the pre-eminence of the Oore of Otun on May 29, 1883, when he wrote:

"Ekiti Parapo is a name given to the confederation of "Efon tribes". There are said to be 132 kings among them. The principal of these kings is one Oray (Oore)".

Due to a controversy between the Northern Government and the administration of Major Reeves Tucker, the territories of Otun, Obo, Ishan, Aiyede and Ikole were carved out of the South and then merged with the territories of Northern Nigeria. Subsequently, and following the readjustment of the boundary between the Ekiti (Southern) and Kabba (Northern) divisions in 1909, Ishan, Aiyede and Ikole returned to the Ekiti division while Otun, Obo and others remained in the North, under Ilorin division. In the period of the Oore's absence in Ekitiland, the idea of an Ekiti council of Obas died away. There was no meeting of the council held throughout the period due to a lack of acceptable leadership among all the Obas. Leadership naturally fell to the Ewi of Ado, who in fact represented the Ekiti Obas at the conference of Yoruba Obas held at Ibadan in 1939. Following the return of Otun town to the Ekiti Division in 1936, the council of Ekiti Obas was re-introduced in the form of the Pelupelu (whose name was derived from "Pe Olu" i.e. "The calling of Lords") and the Oore was again made the president. In the biography of H.R.H. Oba Aladesanmi, an Ewi of Ado Ekiti, the Oba said:

"I am in the third position in the Ekiti Division Council of Traditional Rulers which has the Ajero of Ijero Ekiti as the second. The senior one, Oore of Otun, had his district transferred to Ilorin Emirate Council. It was later returned to Ekiti division of Ondo province after much agitation from the people to the government".

=== The Falegan school ===
Another school of thought contests the supremacy of the Oore as the most senior Oba in Ekiti for several reasons. First is the fact that the Oore did not possess the largest kingdom in the pre-colonial era. The Ewi of Ado-Ekiti and the Deji of Akure had far larger territories. It is argued that the Oore was more of a mercenary king during the Kiriji war, unlike the principal kings who hardly left their palaces even in the face of war. An example of this is the fact that the Ewi remained in Ado, and only left it when his town relocated temporarily due to the Benin horde's invasion. Atolagbe acknowledged that the Oore was not a prince of the Oduduwa dynasty but was rather a friend or benefactor of his. Hence, he was a native personality that was integrated into the Yoruba culture under the dynastic reign of Oduduwa and his successors. As Oduduwa's children and grandchildren included the Ewi, the Ajero, the Alara and the Elekole, all are therefore direct heirs of Oduduwa. Due to this, the Oore could not be of equal rank with them according to Yoruba customary law. He could not have been the most senior Yoruba king in Ekitiland, even if he was an Ekiti native that survived or a follower of Obatala that was conquered. Furthermore, references to the Oore in the Ifa oracle only state that the Oore was also an Ifa follower, whereas the same Ifa section mentions that Ado-Ekiti is the home (or abode) of Ifa, which invariably made the Oore an adherent like any other while the Ewi is a custodian of the Ifa religion.

Moreover, the pelupelus which the Oore chaired at the advent of the Kiriji war in Otun had few of the principal Obas in attendance. They did not include the Ewi, the Deji and the Ogoga, to mention a few. The meetings were regarded as being of a lesser importance, except for mobilizing the coalition of warriors and hunters for the Ekiti war of liberation spearheaded by Fabunmi. There are records which state that the pelupelus held before then were often held in Ado-Ekiti under the Ewi, meetings where the Obas never met, because tradition forbade Obas from looking into each other’s eyes in Yorubaland prior to the arrival of the British. The pelupelu where the Oore was recognized by the British as the most senior Oba was an imposition at Oke-Imo in 1900 by Major Tucker, owing to recognition of his heroic contributions to the Kiriji wars and the signing of its 1886 treaty, the age of the Oore at the time of the meeting, a mistake in the itinerary of Tucker's visit to Ekiti upon which he accorded the Oore a higher status and the role the Oore played as the first Ekiti Oba to accept British colonial rule in Ekitiland. Finally, the story of the Oore where he is mentioned as a co-equal friend of Oduduwa has never been accepted in Ife tradition as being true.

According to Babatola, the fact that a school of Yoruba history regarded the Oore as a prince of Ile-Ife, while others referred to him as a follower of Obatala, whom Oduduwa deposed as king upon his arrival at Ife, is enough reason to ask more questions. On the other hand, Falegan insisted that the Oore could not claim any supremacy or superiority that he did not enjoy in Ekitiland prior to colonial rule. He insisted that if the Oore is a son of Oduduwa, his status would depend on where he is ranked on the list of the prominent children of Oduduwa who made spectacular gains in their adventures away from Ile-Ife, particularly those who drifted towards Ekitiland. Otherwise, if the Oore is an Obatala follower who survived as a native entity that Oduduwa met at Ile-Ife and subsequently integrated, he could not promote himself in tradition above the new dynasty of Oduduwa and his sons in Yorubaland.

Falegan, therefore, remarked thus: "How did the Oore become a king, if he was neither a son of Oduduwa nor his lieutenant?"

Babatola similarly reviewed the version of the Oore's history presented by Atolagbe and other Moba historians and submitted thus: "Atolagbe's reconstruction of Moba history and the place he advocated for Oore in Yoruba and Ekiti history to boost the status of Oore in the eyes of all the world as the most senior Ekiti Oba is a grievous injury to Yoruba history. Indeed, it has an element of profoundly damaging conjuncture of tradition and culture in our history that should be redressed to the extent of its fallacies or distortion. Though the damage done is reversible through the harmonization of different traditions of Ekiti people to expose his delicacies of concoction and false claims, Atolagbe attempted most likely to also score a point against Ekiti Obas who opposed Oore’s listing ahead of them at Oke-Imo meetings in finding a medium of restoring Oore pre-eminence that was gained at the close of Kiriji and early years of British colonial rule in Ekitiland."

== Genetics ==
A Y-DNA study conducted by Curtis Lanre Cole-Showers in 2014 revealed that among the Yoruba population with a geographic origin in Ekiti, approximately 4.2% carry the West Eurasian haplogroup R1b, And the East African haplogroup E1b1b. Notably, the predominant genetic marker within the Ekiti population, accounting for approximately 75%, is the E1b1a haplogroup

== Recent events ==
With the creation of the Ekiti Native Authority (Ekiti Division) at Ado-Ekiti in January 1913, and Akure becoming the provincial centre, and correspondingly with its growth in size and status, the pre-eminence of the Oore and the prominence of the Ewi were gradually resolved politically.

Kenyo compiled a list of 104 Ekiti autonomous communities existing in the 1950s with names of their traditional rulers who came from Ile-Ife or Benin and other places to Ekitiland, though some are now located outside Ekiti State. Despite the fact that the number of autonomous communities in Ekitiland was 104 in 1955 (with some of these towns eventually transferred to neighboring Ondo, Kogi and Kwara States), the number of autonomous local communities in present Ekiti state in 2014 has increased to 134 due to official interventions and government proclamations. The latent question to ask here is whether the Ekiti Obas and their communities who later got local autonomy were initially affected by British re-organization of Ekiti towns, or they were subjugated under larger kingdoms or communities for a long period of time before they successfully asserted their autonomy. Another possibility is that other issues resulted in their differences, which in turn caused their demands for separation from the time of British colonial rule until now.
