= Taiwo Asaolu =

Nigerian academic

Professor Taiwo Asaolu
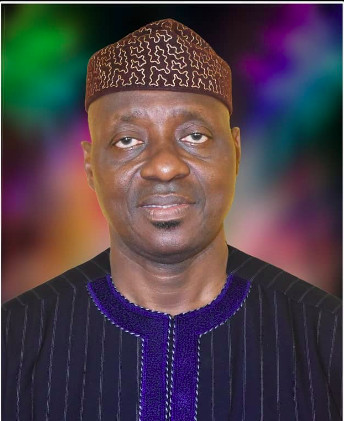
- Born: Ibadan
- Citizenship: Nigeria
- Occupations: Academic, Accountant.
- Board member of: Governing Board, Administrative Staff College of Nigeria (ASCON)
- Children: 6
- Awards: Life Vice President of the Professional Golfers’ Association of Nigeria (PGAN).

Academic background
- Education: B.Sc.; MBA (1993); M.Phil. (2001); Ph.D. (2004)
- Alma mater: Obafemi Awolowo University (Former University of Ife).

Academic work
- Discipline: Accounting
- Institutions: University of Ilesa
- Notable works: Regulatory Interventions and Financial Reporting Quality of Banks: Evidence from Nigeria. Promoting Good Governance through Internal Audit Function (IAF): The Nigerian Experience. Value Creation and Appropriation of Firms: Concepts, Theories and Methodology.

Taiwo Asaolu is a Nigerian professor of accounting and finance. He is also a Fellow (FCA) of the Institute of Chartered Accountants of Nigeria. He is the former Dean, faculty of administration, Obafemi Awolowo University, Ile-Ife, Osun State, Nigeria. He is the pioneer vice-chancellor of the University of Ilesa. He became the vice-chancellor of the University of Ilesa in 2023, following its establishment as a university from the former Osun State College of Education.

== Early life and education ==
Asaolu was born in Ibadan. His primary and secondary school education was in Ibadan. He sat for his West African School Certificate Examination (WASCE) in 1980. He attended the University of Ife and graduated with a B.Sc. in Accounting in 1987. He completed the examinations of Institute of Chartered Accountants (ICAN) and became a Chartered Accountant in November 1992, and that earned him an appointment in the Department of Management and Accounting in 1993 as a Lecturer one (1). Before then, he was an Internal Auditor 2 at the Obafemi Awolowo University in 1989. Thus, he first worked at Obafemi Awolowo University before the University of Ilesa.

He proceeded for his postgraduate (PG) programme in Computer Science, MBA in 1993, M.Phil. in 2001, and Ph.D. in 2004. He rose to the rank of Senior Lecturer in 1996 and became a Reader in 2005. In 2008, be became a professor of accounting. He was the first professor of accounting at Obafemi Awolowo University. He is married and has 6 children. He also has 4 grandchildren.

== Career ==
He began his academic career as a Lecturer I and rose to the post of Vice Chancellor. He is the Vice-Chancellor of the University of Ilesa, Osun State. He was appointed in 2023 after the institution was raised from the status of College of Education. The Osun State Governor, Ademola Adeleke approved the appointment of the Vice Chancellor with other principal officers. Before his appointment, Governor Aeleke appointed him the Chairman of the University of Ilesa review panel that worked on the issues for the take-off of the institution.

The University of Ilesa (UNILESA) was meant to start Medicine and Surgery, and Health Information and Informatics. According to the Vice Chancellor, "arrangement are already in place for the take-off of Medicine and Surgery programme, as the State Government under the leadership of Governor Ademola Adeleke, has approved the upgrading od the State General Hospital in Ilesa, to UNILESA Teaching Hospital." The VC inaugurated a Town Gown Committee of UNILESA. This was held at the University’s Council Chamber to build a relation and community tie between the university and the host community. According to the VC, the objectives of the committee are to: "Foster cooperation and understanding between the university and local community., address issues of mutual concern, such as safety, security, and environmental sustainability, enhance the quality of life for students, staff, and community members. and foster economic development and partnerships between the university and local businesses."

=== Challenges ===
He delivered a lecture titled: "Ethics under pressure: Managing financial risk and integrity in university governance" at the Second Bursary and Internal Audit Annual Lecture of Elizade University, Ilara-Mokin, Ondo State in March 2026. At the lecture, the VC said that the new University has some challenges. One of them is the issue of land grabbing to illegal occupation in the campus. He stated that, “as I’m speaking with you, we have illegal residents on our campus, rearing goats, chickens and others. We have taken the Osun Rangers (local security operatives) there to chase them, but they are still there. We have land grabbers whose fathers have collected compensation. They said they didn’t know anything about it, so they want to retrieve the land. Not only do they want to retrieve the land, but they have also started construction, only to know that they mean business, and these are people who are bold enough to take us to court.”

Another challenge mentioned by the VC is the inheritance of financial liabilities of about N400 million when the University was a state College of Education, Ilesa. He stated that “the large inherited sum was in the form of unpaid bank loan; unpaid internal allowances (Le. peculiar and hazard allowances) to staff for about 56 months, running into about N400m; debt to illegal miners and so many other startling debts.”

== Professional affiliations ==
Asaolu is a Fellow (FCA) of the Institute of Chartered Accountants of Nigeria.

== Achievements ==
Asaolu has published more than 60 journal articles and textbooks in different areas of Accounting, Management and Entrepreneurs. He was once a member of the Governing Board of the Administrative Staff College of Nigeria (ASCON). It was said that he supervised more than 30 Ph. D holders, over 200 M.Sc/ and M. Phil graduates. Six out of his Ph.D students are now full professors. He established a standard on-campus 18-hole golf course and a hosting of international competitions that attracted participants and stakeholders from within and outside Nigeria. He was the Chairman Editorial Board of IAC academy Journal Publications that is indexed by Googlescholar and Crossref.

== Awards ==
He was conferred as Life Vice President of the Professional Golfers’ Association of Nigeria (PGAN).

== Publications ==
Regulatory Interventions and Financial Reporting Quality of Banks: Evidence from Nigeria. . By Taiwo Asaolu, Tajudeen John Ayoola and Ologbenla Patrick published in 2020.
