= Wahab Adegbenro =

Nigerian physician (1955–2020)

Abdul-Wahab Oluropo Adegbenro
- Born: 5 June 1955; Ilara-Mokin, Western Region, British Nigeria (now in Ondo State, Nigeria)
- Died: 2 July 2020 (aged 65); Owo, Nigeria
- Education: University of Benin, Edo state, Nigeria
- Occupation: Nigerian physician

Wahab Oluropo Adegbenro (5 June 1955 – 2 July 2020) was a Nigerian physician who served two terms as a commissioner for health in Ondo State, Nigeria.

== Early life ==
Abdul-Wahab Oluropo Adegbenro was born on 5 June 1955 in Ilara-Mokin in Ifedore Local Government Area of Ondo State, Nigeria, into a polygamous Muslim family of cocoa farmers. His father, Chief Musa Adegbuyan Adegbenro (1924-2014), was the Odofin of Ilara-Mokin from 1994 to his death in 2014, the second highest ranking chief of Ilara-Mokin. The Adegbenros come from a very prestigious lineage in Ilara-Mokin, Adegbenro's paternal great-grandmother, Fatolurin, was the daughter of the Ajero of Ijero Ekiti, Oyiyosoye, her husband, his great-grandfather, Asurigidi l'oogun, was a famed warrior during the Kiriji War. Adegbenro's paternal grandmother, Fagoyibo, was the daughter of Chief Olagbaye, the Odofin of Ilara-Mokin.

Adegbenro had his primary education at Muslim Primary School, Ilara-mokin in Ifedore Local Government Area of Ondo State. He later attended Oyemekun Grammar School, Akure between 1962 and 1967, before proceeding to obtain his Bachelor of Medicine, Bachelor of Surgery (M.B.; B.S.) degree from University of Benin, Edo state, Nigeria.

== Career ==
Adegbenro established Crown Hospital, Akure where he was the chief medical director.

Adegbenro was appointed vice chairman of the Ondo State Committee on Sports for the Disabled from 1997 to 1999, and later became the chairman of the committee from 1999 to 2002. He was also a director of the Ondo State Waste Management Board from 1999 to 2002 before being appointed commissioner in charge of culture and tourism in Ondo State and then as the state commissioner of health.

Adegbenro was a member of the Nigeria Medical Association; a member of the Association of General and Private Medical Practitioners of Nigeria; an associate member, Royal College of General Practitioners of London; and a member of the Nigeria Guild of Medical Directors.

He was the chairman of the Ondo State Inter-ministerial Committee against COVID-19.

== Personal life ==
He was married to Oluwatoyin Adegbenro, and they had children.

== Death ==
Adegbenro was rushed to the Federal Medical Centre in Owo after contracting the coronavirus. He was said to have suffered from diabetes prior to contracting COVID-19. He died on Thursday 2 July 2020, after spending about 10 days at the hospital.

Upon his demise, the Ondo State Government declared Friday 3 July 2020 a work-free day and also directed all flags in the state to fly at half mast for seven days to mourn his death.

He was buried on Friday 3 July 2020 at Ilara-Mokin, Ondo State.
