= Kayode Ijadunola =

Nigerian Academic

Kayode ijadunola

4th Vice-Chancellor of Elizade University
- Incumbent
- Assumed office 1st of February, 2024
- Preceded by: Olukayode Oladipo Amund

Personal details
- Born: Kayode Thadius Ijadunola
- Education: Obafemi Awolowo University
- Profession: Academic

Kayode Thadius Ijadunola is a professor of Public Health and Community Medicine. He is currently the fourth vice-chancellor of Elizade University, having been appointed after the tenure of his predecessor, Kayode Amund, in 2024.

== Career ==
Ijadunola was a professor of Public and Community Health at the Obafemi Awolowo University prior to his appointment as the VC. He was appointed as the Vice-Chancellor of the school after contending with 21 other contestants, of which after various exercises, he emerged as the top candidate. His appointment was official on the 1st of February 2024.
