= Ipogun =

Ipogun- Ayo
- Town
- Location within Nigeria
- Coordinates: 7°18′53″N 5°04′48″E
- Country: Nigeria
- State: Ondo
- Local Government Area: Ifedore
- Established: 15 century

Government
  - Obas: Adapogun
- Time zone: UTC+1 (WAT)

Ipogun-Ayo is a town in Ifedore local government of Ondo State. Ipogun-Ayo is well known for her rich and preserved culture, academics, agriculture and tourism. Ipogun-Ayo is about 17 km from Akure (Ondo state capital), and has Ilara-mokin, Ibule-Soro, Ita-Oniyan, igbara-Oke and Ile-Oluji as neighbouring towns.

Ipogun people trace their origin to Ile-Oluji where they were said to have migrated from because of some feud about a chieftaincy title. Some high chiefs like Odopetu, Elemo, Aro, Ojomu, Owaporu (Native Defence Chief), Elegiri (Native Police Chief) and few others led their families and supporters to migrate out of Ile-Oluji. Getting to Akure area, they went to the then Deji of Akure to pay homage and the Kabiyesi released his first son (prince) to go with them and be their king. So, right from the beginning, Ipogun town has always been governed by a full king.

The people of the town are dominantly farmers but they also send their wards to schools. There are four primary schools (St Jude’s Primary School, St Peter’s Primary School, Muslim Primary School and CAC Primary School) and one secondary school (Ayo Grammar School) in the town. The town are predominantly traditional worshippers but as far back as 1883, the Church Missionary Society brought Anglicanism to the town and founded St Jude’s Anglican Church which today is an Archdeaconry headquarters in Akure Diocese. Today, there are many other churches in the town - St Peter’s Catholic Church, Arulefela Memorial Anglican Church, Christ Apostolic Church, The Redeemed Christian Church of God and so on.

The Oba of town is called Adapogun of Ipogun and he is always in charge of the town and the suburb villages. The current Oba is His Royal Highness Oba Rapheal Ojo who was enthroned in the year 2000.
