= Sophie Oluwole =

Nigerian professor and philosopher (1935-2018)

Sophie Bosede Oluwole
- Born: 12 May 1935; Igbara-oke, Ondo State
- Died: 23 December 2018 (aged 83)

Philosophical work
- Region: African philosophy, Yoruba philosophy
- Main interests: epistemology, ontology, philosophy of religion, philosophy of language.

Sophie Bosede Oluwole (née Aloba, 12 May 1935 – 23 December 2018) was a Nigerian professor and philosopher, and the first person to earn a doctorate in philosophy at a Nigerian university. She was a practitioner of Yoruba philosophy, a way of thinking that stems from the ethnic group based in Nigeria. She was vocal about the role of women in philosophy and the underrepresentation of African thinkers in education.

== Early life and adolescence ==
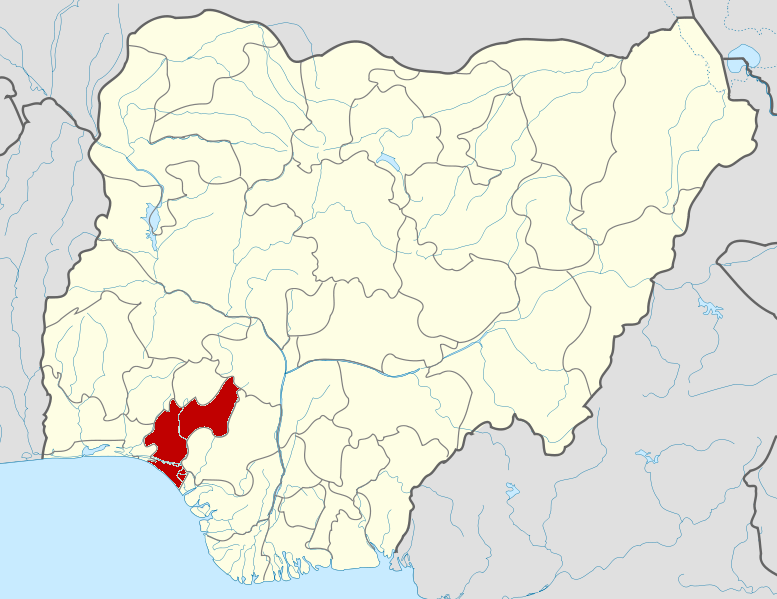
Map showing where the Ondo state is located in Nigeria

Sophie Bosede Olayemi Oluwole was born May 12, 1935, in the city of Igbara-oke, in the Ondo State of Southwestern Nigeria. Ethnically, she and her parents were Edo, but she grew up with an intense interest in Yoruba traditions. This was due to her maternal grandmother being Yoruba, and the majority of those around her were Yoruba as well. Her parents, being Anglican Christians, did not support her learning of these traditions and banned her and her 3 siblings from attending any Yoruba rituals. In place of Yoruba tradition, Oluwole’s parents encouraged her to prioritize Christianity in her life.

At the age of 8, she was baptized under the name “Sofia”, which would later become Sophie. The name was given to her by the headmaster of her local school, who also happened to be a family friend. She went to Anglican schools in Ife, up until she went to college in 1953.

== Education ==
In 1953, she enrolled at the Women Training College in Ilesa, where she finished with a class IV certificate in 1954 and then became a qualified teacher. Oluwole went on to teach at the British-oriented Women in Training college from 1953-1954. For the next decade, she taught in Nigeria. After her first marriage to Professor Olanrewaju Joseph Fapohunda, she and her husband moved to Moscow and attempted to learn the Russian language. Oluwole studied Russian to prepare for studying economics, unfortunately, her husband experienced great trouble grasping the language so the couple moved to Germany. After a year at the University of Cologne, she was offered a full scholarship in Philology but decided to join her husband in the United States. She ultimately decided to complete her college education at the University of Lagos in 1967, where she decided to study Philosophy instead of English, allegedly because of the reputation of Professor Wole Soyinka.

Following obtaining her first degree in 1970, she was employed in UNILAG for a time as an assistant lecturer in 1972, and went on to complete her PhD at the University of Ibadan, making her the first to hold a doctorate degree in philosophy. Oluwole had taken interest in traditional African philosophy before obtaining her PhD but did not have any faculty to supervise a thesis or dissertation on such a topic. Oluwole taught African Philosophy for six years between 2002 and 2008 at the University of Lagos. At a time, she also served as the first female Dean of Student Affairs in the same institution.

== Teachings and philosophy ==
Oluwole's teachings and works are accredited to the Yoruba school of philosophical thought, which was ingrained in the cultural and religious beliefs (Ifá) of the various regions of Yorubaland. Many of Oluwole's teachings and works synthesized the Orisha Orunmila with the teachings of Socrates. These two thinkers, represented the values of the African and Western traditions, and were two of Oluwole's biggest influences as she compared the two in her book Socrates and Orunmila. It's important to understand that some Yoruba traditions understand Orunmila to be a legendary figure of worship, whereas Oluwole understood him to be one of, if not the, first Yoruba sages. In her book, Oluwole went on to examine 12 different parallels between the two thinkers. The parallels are as follows: Both thinkers were born around the year 500B.C., both of their fathers were stone masons, both of their mothers had names relating to virtue and sacrifice, both of their wives were greatly involved in their lives, both of the men were depicted as ugly dark skinned short men with a tendency to drink and a wobble when he walked, Socrates was said to be poor whereas Orunmila was said to be well enough off to take care of his associates, both had a minimum of 10 disciples, both preached virtue as the way to a good life and had more than one wife but were either accused of or took part in homosexuality, the two condemned those who claimed to "possess absolute knowledge", both were considered to be main ideological contributors to certain books though neither of the pieces bear their names, both lived in areas that were the social and cultural hub of their time period, and neither of the men ever wrote down anything. In addition to parallels within their personal and social lives, Oluwole also compared the similarities and differences in their ideologies.

Throughout her book, Oluwole disputes the idea that there is one universal logic system. She asks the philosophical world to consider that an African philosophical system and a Western philosophical system can both exist without demeaning or invalidating the other. Oluwole specifically explores the Ifá Corpus; she asks that Ifa be considered as a legitimate rational system. It was explored by a philosopher just as valid as Socrates, and as an oral text and divination system, is in fact a specific African logic that makes up what Oluwole calls "Classical African Philosophy". According to Oluwole's view, "binary complementary logic is to be found in the working of the cosmos, in the natural mechanism that causes movement, sustains and transforms...African Philosophy differs from the Western philosophical logical system, which is based on a binary opposition between paired entities, such as man versus woman, dark versus light. Yoruba logic is, instead, based on the idea that there is not an opposing but a complementary duality between entities." Giving validity to this logical system helps to better give validity to African philosophy as a whole, further emphasizing and reiterating that the African perspective is not lesser than or inferior to the western logical system.

Oluwole considered herself to be a "critical traditionalist." She critically analyzed sage wisdom and the teaching of Orunmila from the perspective that he was a philosopher rather than an eponymous god. Oluwole continually reiterates the belief that the ability to read or write does not inherently make a person a better thinker or philosopher. Her classification of African oral traditions as a genuine part of philosophy includes the concept that the ability to read or write are not requirements in order for a person to be a philosopher.

== Personal life and death ==
According to Asiwaju Bola Tinubu, Oluwole was "loved and celebrated Yoruba tradition and philosophy so much that she was nicknamed Mamalawo (female herbalist)." Oluwole was first married to Professor Olanrewaju Joseph Fapohunda, a professor of Economics. The two moved to Moscow together and then Germany, and finally the United States, before the pair separated and she finished her education in Nigeria. The couple had 4 children together before their split. Oluwole's second marriage was to Oluwole Akinwunmi, a teacher in her hometown of Ignara-oke. The two were married until his death. Oluwole died on 23 December 2018 in Ibafo, Ogun State, Nigeria at the age of 83. She was survived by children, grandchildren, and great-grandchildren.

== Bibliography ==
Some books and articles written by Oluwole include:

=== Books ===
- Oluwole, Sophie (1992). Witchcraft, Reincarnation and the God-Head. Issues in African Philosophy. Ikeja, Lagos: Excel Publishers. ISBN 9789783013032. OCLC 30008785.
- Oluwole, Sophie B. (1997). Philosophy and Oral Tradition. Ikeja, Lagos, Nigeria: ARK Publications. ISBN 9789783389052. OCLC 44117856.
- Oluwole, Sophie B. (2014). Socrates and Ọ̀rúnmìlà : two patron saints of classical philosophy. Lagos: Ark Publishers. ISBN 9789789295258. OCLC 921844799.
- Oluwole, Sophie B.; Akin Sofoluwe, J.O. (2014). African myths and legends of gender. Lagos: Ark Publishers. ISBN 9789789317240. OCLC 994204609.

=== Article ===
- Oluwole, Sophie B. (1997). "Culture, Gender, and Development Theories in Africa". Africa Development / Afrique et Développement. 22 (1): 95–121. JSTOR 24482785. Gender Revisited/Le genre revisité.

== Secondary literature ==
- Fayemi, Ademola K. (2018). "Remembering the African Philosopher, Abosede Sophie Oluwole: A Biographical Essay". Filosofia Theoretica. 7 (3): 118–131.
- Presbey, Gail (27 May 2020). "Sophie Olúwọlé's Major Contributions to African Philosophy". Hypatia. 35 (2). Semantic Scholar: 231–242. doi:10.1017/hyp.2020.6. S2CID 219884905.
