= Adaba FM =

- Akure; Nigeria
- Broadcast area: Ilara-Mokin, Ifedore, Ondo State
- Frequency: 88.9 MHz

Programming
- Languages: English, Yoruba

Ownership
- Owner: TVC Communications

History
- First air date: 2008

Links
- Website: adaba889.fm

Adaba FM (88.9 MHz) is a radio station situated at Ilara-Mokin in Ifedore Local Government Area of Ondo State, Nigeria.
