= Olukayode =

Olukayode is a Yoruba masculine given name, commonly used in Nigeria. Its meaning is "God brings happiness" in Yoruba. Notable people with the name include:

- Olukayode Oladipo Amund, Nigerian academic administrator
- Olukayode Ariwoola (born 1954), Nigerian jurist and justice of the Supreme Court of Nigeria
- Olukayode "Kayode" Elegbede (born 1955), Nigerian sprinter and long jumper
- John Olukayode Fayemi (born 1965), Nigerian politician and former governor of Ekiti State
