= Ijare =

- Town
- Location within Nigeria
- Coordinates: 7°22′0″N 5°10′0″E
- State: Ondo
- LGA: Ifedore
- Elevation: 455 m (1,493 ft)
- Time zone: UTC+1 (WAT)

Ijare is a town in Ifedore Local Government Area of Ondo State, Nigeria. It lies around 20 km north-northeast of the city of Akure. A traditionally Yoruba-speaking area, the town maintains a ceremonial ruler from the pre-colonial era, the Olujare of Ijare. The town has two Secondary Schools: Anglican Grammar School (founded in 1972) and the C.A.C. Comprehensive High School. It has a Post Office (commissioned in 1969), a Community Bank, three Health Centres and had its public water supply system (commissioned in 1970)renovated in late 2006.
