= Francis Adefarakanmi Agbede =

Monarch of the Igbara-oke kingdom, Nigeria (born 1954)

Oba Francis Adefarakanmi Agbede, Ilufemiloye Ogidi III

13th Olowa of Igbara Oke
- Reign: 2017–present
- Predecessor: Oba John Adebimpe Adepoju
- Born: 24 July 1954 (age 71); Igbara-oke, Ondo State, Nigeria
- Spouse: Olori Adejoke Agbede; Olori Yetunde Agbede
- House: Ogidi
- Father: Prince Chief Ezekiel Abiodun Agbede
- Mother: Chief Florence Agbede

Francis Adefarakanmi Agbede known as Oba Ilufemiloye Ogidi III, is a Nigerian and Yoruba businessman and monarch who has been the 13th Ọba, or Olowa of the town of Igbara-oke, Ondo State since 2017.

== Biography ==
He was born on 24 July 1954 into a royal dynasty of Ogidi to Chief Ezekiel Abiodun Agbede, who was a police officer, and his mother, Mrs. Florence Agbede, a trader. His paternal grandparents were Prince Joseph Famibio Agbede and Olori Alice Arabi Agbede. His paternal great-grandfather was Oba Adejuri Ogidi I, the 7th Olowa of Igbara Oke. His uncle was Oba Aderibigbe Agbede Ogidi II, who was the 11th Olowa of Igbara-Oke. He attended the Baptist Primary School in Kaduna and later proceeded to Anglican Grammar School in Igbara-Oke. He earned a degree in Business Administration at Bayero University, Kano, Nigeria, and later did post graduate studies overseas.

He has worked as a teacher, administrator, accountant and as a security and intelligence consultant. He is the Chairman of Crown Continental Limited.

He is a Member of different professional bodies; Member of American Society of Industrial Security, MASIS; Member, Nigerian Institute of Management, MNIM; Member, British Chartered Institute of Management, MBCIM; Member of the World Association of Detectives, MWAD; Fellow of the Institute of Fraud Examiner of Nigeria, African Awareness School, an Affiliate of Babcock University; Fellow, Certified Institute of Management, FCIM.
