= Olukayode Oladipo Amund =

Nigerian Academic

Olukayode Oladipupo Amund

3rd Vice-Chancellor of Elizade University
- In office 2019 – 4th of May 2023
- Succeeded by: Kayode Ijadunola

Personal details
- Born: Olukayode Oladipupo Amund
- Education: University of Lagos, University of Kent, Cranfield University
- Profession: Academic

Olukayode Oladipupo Amund is a professor and the third vice-chancellor of Elizade University. He was appointed as the VC by the board of trustees of the school in 2019.

== Career ==
Amund is a professor of Petroleum and Environmental microbiology before his appointment as the Vice-Chancellor of the school.He is a Fellow of the Nigerian Academy of Science (FAS), Fellow, Institute of Policy Management Development (FIPMD), Fellow, Royal Society of Biology (FRSB), Fellow, African Academy of Sciences (FAAS) and African Scientific Institute (FAS).His tenure as the 3rd Vice-Chancellor of Elizade University ended after 45 years of service in the school at the age of 70 years He was the pioneer Vice-Chancellor of Wesley University of Science and Technology and the Dean of Students and Hall Master of University of Lagos.
