= Omuo =

Ancient town in Ekiti State, western Nigeria

Coordinates: 7°45′46.85″N 5°43′28.98″E

Omuo-Ekiti is an ancient town in the eastern part of Ekiti State in western Nigeria, and the seat of the Ekiti-East local government. Being inside Yorubaland, its population and that of Ekiti State are mainly the Yoruba It is located on the border of the state of Ondo and Kogi.

== Administration ==
Omuo-Ekiti is the headquarters of Ekiti East Local Government.

The traditional ruler of Omuo kingdom is the "Olomuo", currently Oba Noah Omonigbehin, Okinbaloye II. His supporting high chiefs include the Olisa of Ilisa, Chief Olatunbosun Orojo. Ilisa is the royal center of Omuo-Ekiti which comprises Oke-Iloro, Egunje, Omodowa, Apoge, Adumari, and more villages. Other high chiefs in Omuo Ekiti include Odofin of Iludofin, Ajero of Ijero and Alawe of Iworo. Other chiefs administer Ekurugbe, Ahan, Oya, Oruju, Edugbe and Araromi.

== Geography and demographics ==
Omuo-Ekiti is about 75 km away from Ado Ekiti, the Ekiti state capital. The town is located in the Yoruba cultural region, and has many Christian residents as well as Jehovah's Witnesses and Muslims. Islam was brought to Omuo Ekiti by Balogun Usthman (a.k.a. DODO-NDAWA), the warlord that defended Omuo-Ekiti from slavers during the early days of the settlement. In 2001, the town's population was over 6000.

== Climate and vegetation ==
Omuo-Ekiti enjoys a tropical climate with two distinct seasons: the rainy season, between April and October, and the dry season, between November and March. The temperature ranges from 21 °C to 29 °C with high humidity. The wind tends to be south-westerly in the rainy season, while the northeast trade winds (Harmattan) are predominant in the dry season.

Omuo-Ekiti has tropical forests and savannas. The town is a trading point for the production of cassava and sweet potato in the surrounding areas, which aids their further development.

== Education ==
Omuo is home to various schools, including the Polytechnic Omuo, the Omuo Comprehensive High School, the Omuo Ore Secondary School, the Amunnu Comprehensive High School, the Omuo Community Grammar School, and other government and private-owned primary and secondary schools.

== Markets ==
Omuo is one of the chief commercial towns in Ekiti state, with several industries and markets, including Oja-Obadore Market and Omuo Community Market Kota.

== Ethnic relationships ==
Although primarily a Yoruba community, Omuo is home to members of other ethnic groups, including Igbo, Hausa, Ebira, Fulani and Ijaw.

== Festivals ==
Omuo has a rich cultural heritage with many festivals. The Ayan festival in Iludofin draws in many residents to celebrate. Omuo is a secular town, but it celebrates Islamic festivals such as Eid al-Adha, Eid al-Fitr, and Eid Kabir, Christian festivals such as Christmas and Easter, and New Year's Day. Omuo Ekiti celebrates its yam festival on the seventh of July every year.
