= Obaala =

Title of the Yoruba

Obaala (or in Yoruba orthography Ọbaálá) (also Obala, Obanla) is a senior title in the royal council of many kingdoms of the Central Yoruba subgroups, namely: the Igbomina, Ijẹṣa and Ekiti.

Ọbaálá means "mighty king" or "senior king" and is almost always next in rank to the high king or paramount king of the areas where the title is used. The Ọbaálá is often designated as the automatic regent on the demise of any reigning king or paramount king.

The most famous Ọbaálá in recent Yoruba history is Ogedengbe, the Ijẹṣa war commander who co-led the "Ekiti Parapọ", a clan confederation which stood to oppose the imperialism of 19th century Ibadan.
