= Oluwole Akinyele Agbede =

Nigerian academic

- Born: Oluwole Akinyele Agbede
- Education: Obafemi Awolowo University, Ile-Ife; City University London
- Occupation: Professor
- Years active: 1988–present

Oluwole Akinyele Agbede is a professor of Water resources and Geotechnical engineering at the University of Ibadan. He is a fellow of the Nigerian Academy of Science who was elected into the academy's Fellowship at its Annual General Meeting held in January 2015. He received a bachelor's degree in Applied Geophysics in 1976 and master's degrees in Engineering Geology in 1982 from Obafemi Awolowo University, Ile Ife and a doctorate degree in Civil engineering from City University London in 1985.
