= Bolaji Agbede =

Nigerian banker

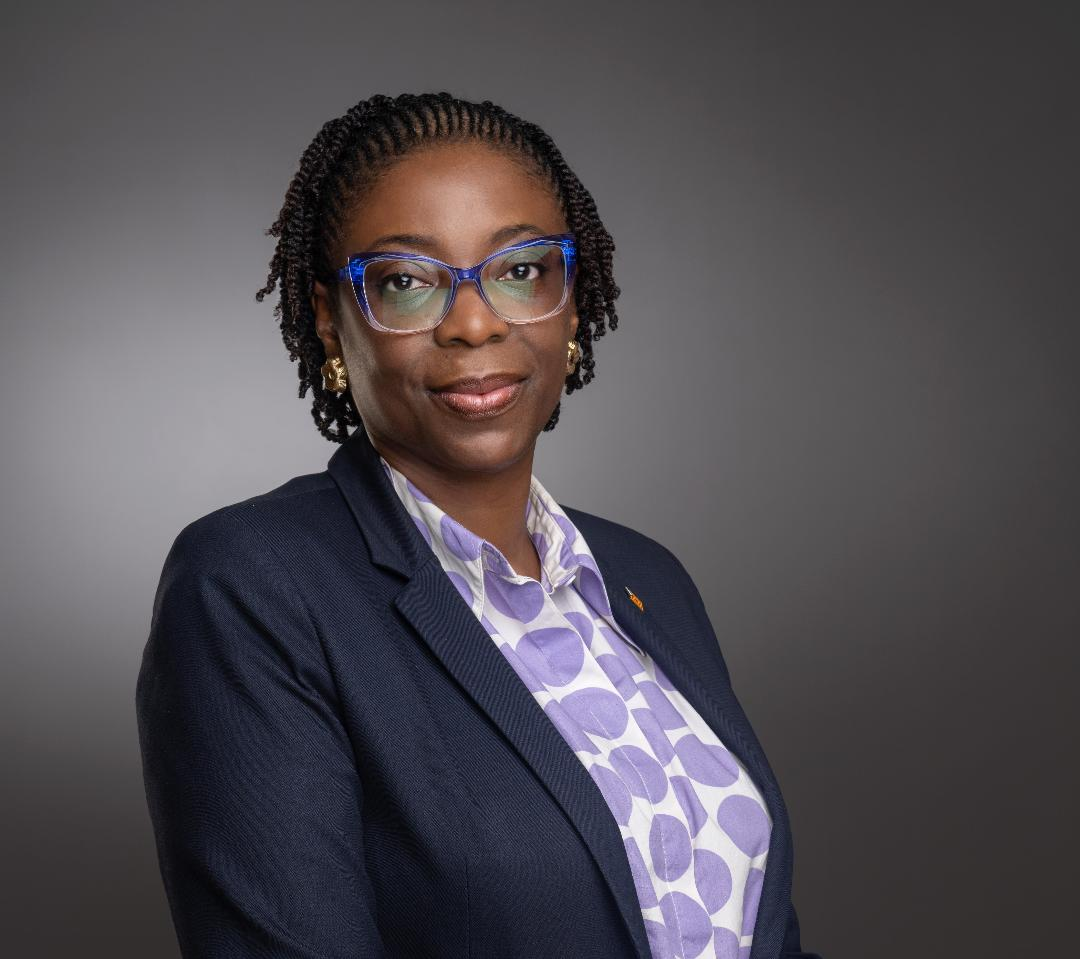
- Official portrait
- Born: Bolaji Olaitan Agbede; Nigeria
- Education: University of Lagos; Cranfield University
- Occupations: Banker, Businesswoman
- Employer: Access Holdings Plc

Bolaji Olaitan Agbede is a Nigerian banker and corporate executive who is the acting managing director and group CEO of Access Holdings since 12 February 2024, following the death of Herbert Wigwe. At the time she was appointed acting CEO, She was the company's most senior founding executive director, responsible for business support.

== Background and education ==
She is a Nigerian national. She graduated with a Bachelor of Science degree in mathematics and statistics in 1990 from the University of Lagos. She went on to obtain a Master of Business Administration from Cranfield University in 2002. She is an honorary member of Chartered Institute of Management of the United Kingdom and the Chartered Institute of Personnel Management of Nigeria.

== Career ==
As of March 2024, her career stretched back more than 27 years, with experience in banking operations, customer relationship management, and human resources management. Agbede began her professional career with Guaranty Trust Bank in 1992 and rose to the position of Manager in 2001. In 2003, she served as CEO of JKG Limited, a business consulting firm. She joined Access Bank Plc in 2003 as an Assistant General Manager and became the Group Human Resources Director in 2010, serving in that capacity until 2022.

In 2022, she was appointed the company's founding executive director, in charge of business support

Following the death of Herbert Wigwe in a helicopter crash in the United States on 9 February 2024, the board of directors of Access Bank Group (Access Holdings Plc), appointed her as the acting group CEO.
