= Ibule-Soro =

Ibule-Soro Ugbule Abule Soro
- Town
- Location of Ibule-Soro in Nigeria
- Coordinates: 7°18′0″N 5°7′0″E
- Country: Nigeria
- State: Ondo y
- Local Government Area: Ifedore

Government
  - Type: Monarchy
- Elevation: 1,237 ft (377 m)

Population (2025)
  - Total: 500,000
- Time zone: UTC+1 (WAT)

Ibule-Soro is a town in Ifedore local government area of Ondo State, SouthWestern Nigeria. It is renowned for selling the best of palm wine in Ondo State which has led both the masses and top government office holders accustomed to the area.

== Legend ==
=== "Jooro" ===
"Jooro" the river goddess is a deity in Ibule-Soro which is believed to give children to the barren, promote indigenes in their works of life, heal the sick and avoid calamities. The deity which is worshipped annually by its followers by offering pigeons and kolanuts also play a key role in the installation and burial of a monarch in the town.

=== Taboo ===
Ibule-Soro forbids the giving birth or coming in of an albino into the town to avoid the wrath of the river goddess. The wearing of beads near the river Jooro is also forbidden with the exception of only the chief priest.
