= Igbara-Oke =

Igbara-Oke Ùgbàrà-òkè
- city
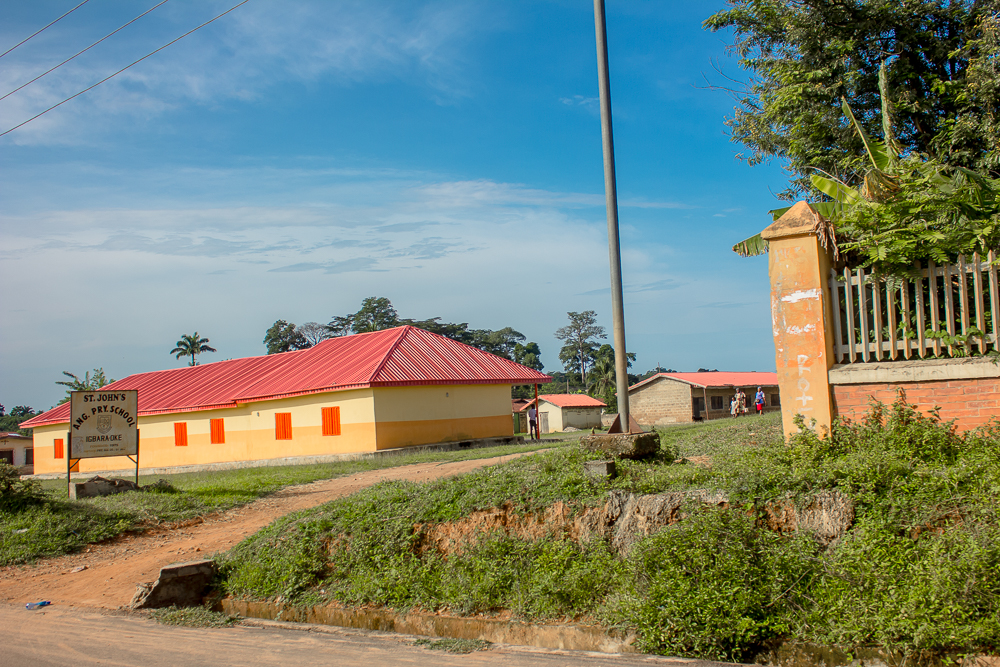

- Location in Nigeria
- Coordinates: 7°24′49.3″N 5°3′2.5″E
- Country: Nigeria
- State: Ondo State
- LGA: Ifedore

Government
  - Type: Ifedore local government
  - Olowa: Oba Dr. Francis Adefarakanmi Agbede
  - Density: 2/km^{2} (5.2/sq mi)

Igbara-Oke, popularly referred to as Nodal Town, is an Ekiti town in Ondo State, Nigeria. It is the headquarters of Ifedore Local Government Council. The total population for the local government area was 176,372 as at 2006 (National Population Commission, 2009). Igbara-Oke is a Yoruba town and the inhabitants are largely engaged in agriculture. Igbara-Oke is a town that shares border with three states in Nigeria, Ondo, Osun and Ekiti states. Igbara-Oke is a tripatite town. An entry point into Ondo State when coming from either Osun or Ekiti State. A land of peace, unity, love and harmony. A land that is viable for industrial and infrastructural development. Igbara-Oke has Thirteen (13) Satellites towns and villages.

Oba Oba Dr. Francis Adefarakanmi Agbede, a Yoruba monarch, is the 13th Olowa of Igbara-Oke kingdom, Ondo State since 2017.

== History of Igbara-Oke ==
A short historical expose of Igbara Oke in the Ekiti dialect by a native speaker

Igbara-Oke, a nodal town that is located on a mountain top, with a panegyric, "ọmọ ẹlẹ́yẹ ti ń ṣe wẹ́yẹ̀wẹ́yẹ̀," (roughly translated as "the children of the bird that sings loudly"). Igbara-Oke was known for its location as a trading post between the Benin kingdom and Yoruba Ilesa and Oyo kingdoms. It was widely known for its war successes, according to local historian, it was reported that the then Oba of Ilesa sent emissaries headed by Ogedengbe to Olowa when they heard of the performances of Igbara-Oke at the war.

The people of Igbara-Oke have lived in that region for several millennia, see the Proto-Yoruboid migration for information on their migration to Igbara-Oke, which likely occurred in the first centuries of the common era, perhaps around 400 AD. Igbara-Oke is closely aligned with its sister town, Igbara-Odo. Akure historians have explained that migrants from Igbara-Odo established Igbara-Oke, where the hunter Uliji and members of the Igbara-Odo royal family who were unable to be crowned king first established a settlement there, though people likely already had established villages in the region. There is a widely known oral history of the founding of the monarchies of Igbara-Odo and Igbara-Oke.

A man by the name of Arajaka, who is said to be a son of Obalufon Alayemore of the Ife Kingdom is believed to have been the first king of Igbara Oke. It is believed that he, along with his sons Arajaka along with a group of warriors migrated from Ife to Igbara-Oke. This is likely associated with the collapse of the Ife Kingdom that took place in the 15th century, in which Obalufon Alayemore's kingdom collapsed during a smallpox outbreak in the region. Other towns in the region have similar founding stories for their monarchy, see Ilara-Mokin. Arajaka is believed to left with a crown given to him by Obanifon, as well as the sword of Alayere (a deity), Igba-Ifa, guns and some farm implements. They stopped and stayed briefly at numbers of places before they arrived at the present day Igbara-Oke. Amongst the places they stopped were present day Ilesa, Alaaye, Igbo Onigbagbara, Onikolo. They later settled temporarily at Olowinrin for thirteen years. At Olowinrin, Arajaka, group gave birth to twins, Alarelu and Adeyiba. The people at that time suffered great disaster at Olowinrin. An epidemic broke out and claim the lives of Arajaka and other people. This disease forced the people to leave Olowinrin, and went in two different directions. This disease epidemic may be referring to the smallpox outbreak of that region that had claimed the lives of Arajaka's father Obalufon and other Ife nobles.

Alarelu and his group departed South wards of Olowinrin to Odo-Oko, which later became Igbara-Odo, while Adeyigba went upwards to Oke-Oko, which later became Igbara-Oke. Alarelu and Adeyigba likely were able to conquer the small independent villages of the region and establish themselves as rulers.

The name Igbara was gotten from a forest called "Aigbara" where Adeyiba was born. The forest also contains a kind of leave called "Ewe Aigbara" that serves as herbs to cure diseases during that time.

When the two brothers parted ways to settle at different domain, Alarelu, the elder son took the name "Arajaka", and his brother, Adeyiba chose to bear "Olowa" from their father's name, OLOWA ARAJAKA. That is why we have Arajaka in Igbara-Odo and Olowa in Igbara-Oke.

Adeyiba later became the first king of Igbara-Oke, and he divided the town into six quarters, with a Principal Chief as the head of each quarters. These six chiefs also have minor chiefs under them who were given responsibilities for conflict resolutions, peace, security, and sacrifices to the gods and welfare matters. Many of these chiefs compose of the descendants of residents of Igbara-Oke before the arrival of Adeyiba as well as those who journeyed with Adeyiba.

For most of its history, Igbara-Oke was under the control of the Akure Kingdom and by extension, the Benin Empire

== Climate ==
Igbara-Oke has a tropical savanna climate with substantial rainfall during the April–October rainy season. The dry season brings warmer, clearer conditions, though temperatures remain relatively stable throughout the year.

== Satellite Villages ==
1. Ajebamidele

2. Olorunda

3. Owode Owena

4. Onijaka

5. Elemo

6. Araromi I

7. Araromi II

8. Kajola

9. Aro

10. Olorunsogo

11. Aje Oku

12. Bolorunduro

13. Odofin/Alaranogun

== Festivals ==
In Igbara-Oke, there are twenty-four traditional festivals that are celebrated annually, namely:

1. Alabasaba

2. Ibegun Obaji

3. Ijobi Ode

4. Ijobi Aro

5. Ijobi Olua

6. Ijobi Obanifon

7. Odun Opa

8. Odun Ogun Oye

9. Odun Oke-ile (Ipaka festival)

10. Ipagbon Aro

11. Igbagbon Aro

12. Ikedi Olua

13. Ijesu Aro

14. Airegbe

15. Ijesu Olua

16. Ijesu Obanifon

17. Idasu Igbara Kete

18. Oja Eran

19. Aruleje Arulemu

20. Idasu Ogun

21. Ibegun Olowa

22. Ibegu Igbara kete

23. Ijesu Olowa

24. Orikadun

== Modern History ==
Igbara-Oke was involved in many Yoruba inter-tribal wars against the Ibadan, Ijesa and Ekiti Parapo. Igbara-Oke rebuffed the Ogedengbe warriors and was victorious at the Akurin and Oboto wars. However, by the middle of the 19th century, Igbara-Oke was defeated by the Benin forces, thereby subjecting the town to Benin administration.

Administratively, Igbara-Oke is the Headquarters of Ifedore Local Government Council. An Agrarian town, most of the residents are farmers. Christianity was first introduced to Igbara-Oke in 1884. Also, in 1911, the first primary school was established in Igbara-Oke, with standard six.

In 1958, Igbara-Oke became the first town to have Secondary School in Ifedore Local Government, Anglican Grammar School. Records also show that after Ado-Ekiti, Igbara-Oke was the next town that have standard six class in the then entire Akure Division.

At the last count, Igbara-Oke has more than One hundred doctors (Medicine and Academics), and about fifteen professors. The town has produced two Vice Chancellors of World Class Universities.

== List of monarchs ==
Oba Adeyigba gave birth to three children, namely, Oberubese, Ogidi and Aruogbon. After Oba Adeyiba, different Olowa from the three ruling houses, Oberubese, Ogidi and Aruogbon have ascended the throne. Several Olowas are likely missing from this list after Ojodu, perhaps because of early occupation of the town by Benin. The Olowas that have ascended the throne are:

- Oba Adeyigba Aboaba (1500s)
- Oba Otete Obaji (1500s)
- Oba Agbonyin Lamuditokun (1500s)
- Oba Ojodu/Olodu Agan Oberubese (1600s)
- Oba Aruogbon Adekoye (c. 1790-c. 1820)
- Oba Fatile (c.1820-c.1860)
- Oba Adejuri Ogidi I (1860-1900)
- Oba Faleke Aropupa Biodide (1900-1919)
- Oba Aladesoyin Oberubese (1919-1928)
- Oba Adetiloye Aruogbon (1928-1970)
- Oba Isaac Aderibigbe Agbede (August 1970 – 2004) (uncle of the current Oba)
- Oba John Adebimpe Adepoju JP (2004-December 2016)
- Oba Dr. Francis Adefarakanmi Agbede (2017–present)

== Notable people ==
- Oba Dr. Francis Adefarakanmi Agbede (2017–present) – The 13th and current Olowa of Igbara‑Oke, officially installed in 2017 and recognized by the Ondo State Government
