= Elizade University =

Private university in Nigeria

Coordinates: 7.3671°N 5.1066°E

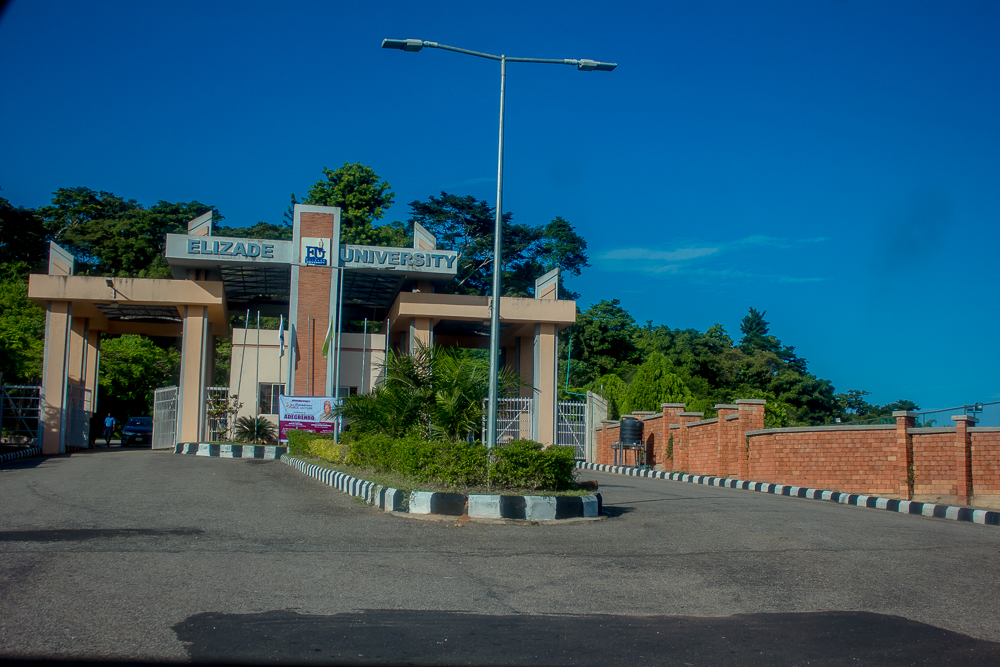
- Elizade University, Ilara-Mokin, main gate
- Motto: Pragmatic Innovation for Development
- Type: Private
- Established: 2013
- Location: Ilara-Mokin, Ondo State, Nigeria
- Website: www.elizadeuniversity.edu.ng

Elizade University (E.U) is a private university in Ilara-Mokin, Ondo State in Nigeria. It was founded by Micheal Ade Ojo.

Elizade University has five faculties which are Faculty of Engineering, Faculty of Social and Management Sciences, Faculty of Basic and Applied Sciences, Faculty of Law and Faculty of Humanities. It has twenty four departments in these facilities all together.

The university, which took off in January 2013 with 64 students, 13 programmes and two Faculties, has experienced all-round geometric increase. At the mid-term review of the rapid progress made by the university, the institution had a total of twenty-five fully accredited programmes in the Faculties of Basic and Applied Sciences, Engineering, Humanities, Social and Management Sciences and Law, with about 1,500 students in the 2020/2021 Academic Session.

The university has also mounted seven additional undergraduate programmes. They are Nursing Science, Medical Laboratory Science, Political Science, Sociology, Architecture, Quantity Surveying and Estate Management, while the National Universities Commission (NUC) has given the university approval to run 15 Postgraduate programmes, both at M.Sc. and Ph.D. levels.

== Library ==
The Library provides hybrid resources for teaching, learning and research. It is automated with KOHA ILS and the bibliographic details of its collections are in electronic format accessible through remote login from anywhere and anytime in the world. The Library collections range from print collections, curated open educational resources, digital resources, institutional repository, video documentaries and other multi-media resources.

== Gallery ==
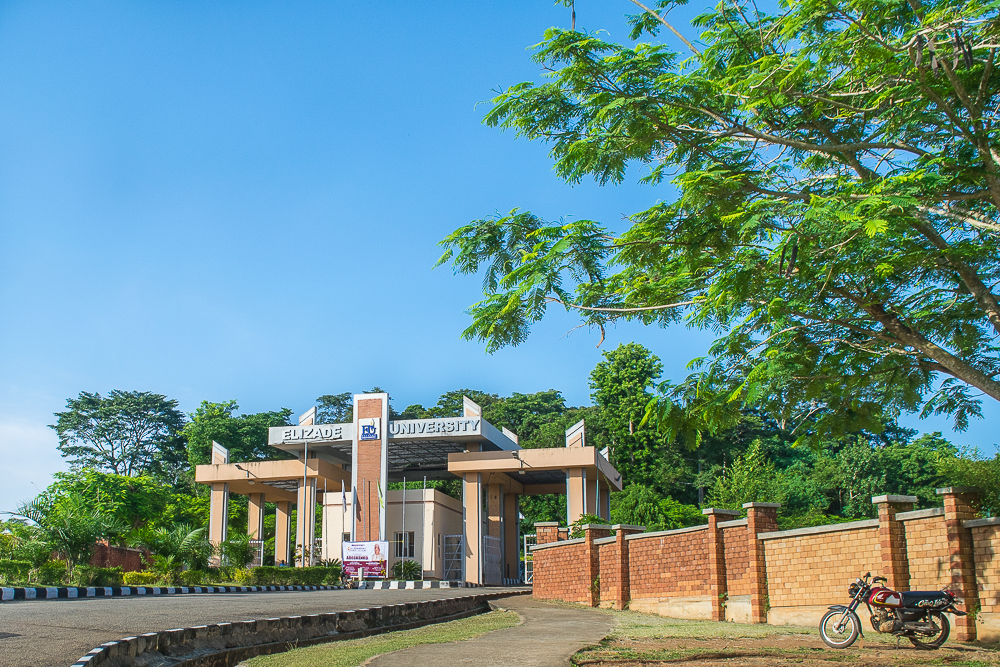
