= Ifedore =

- LGA
- Interactive map of Ifedore
- Country: Nigeria
- State: Ondo State
- Headquarter: Igbara-Oke

Area
  - Total: 295 km^{2} (114 sq mi)

Population (2006)
  - Total: 176,327
  - Density: 598/km^{2} (1,550/sq mi)
- Time zone: UTC+1 (WAT)
- Postal code: 340

Ifedore is a Local Government Area in Ondo State, Nigeria. Its headquarters is in the town of Igbara-Oke. Elizade University is located in the area.

It has an area of 295 km^{2} and a population of 176,327 at the 2006 census.

The postal code of the area is 340.

== Climate ==
Ifedore experiences a tropical wet-and-dry climate characterized by a long rainy season, peaking between July and September. Temperatures remain warm across the year, with humidity highest during the wet season months.

== Economy ==
In Ifedore Local Government Area, farming is a major economic activity. Substantial amounts of crops, including yam, plantain, and cocoa, are farmed there. In addition, the Local Government Area is home to a number of markets that give locals a place to trade a range of goods and services. In addition, Ifedore Local Government Area is home to a number of public and commercial institutions, hotels, banks, and leisure areas.
