= Deputy governor of Ondo State =

Nigerian state official

Deputy Governor of Ondo State
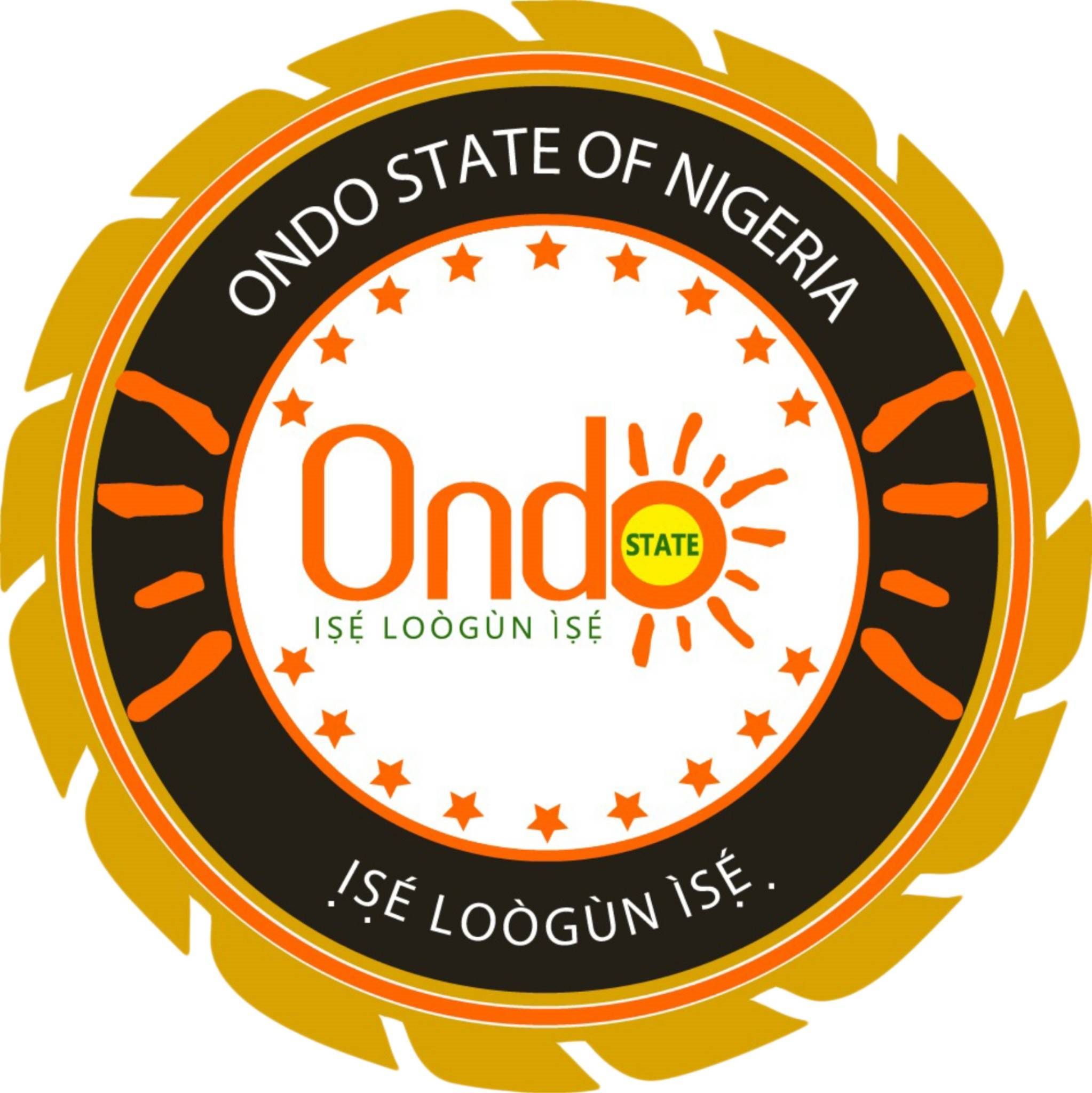
- Seal of Ondo State

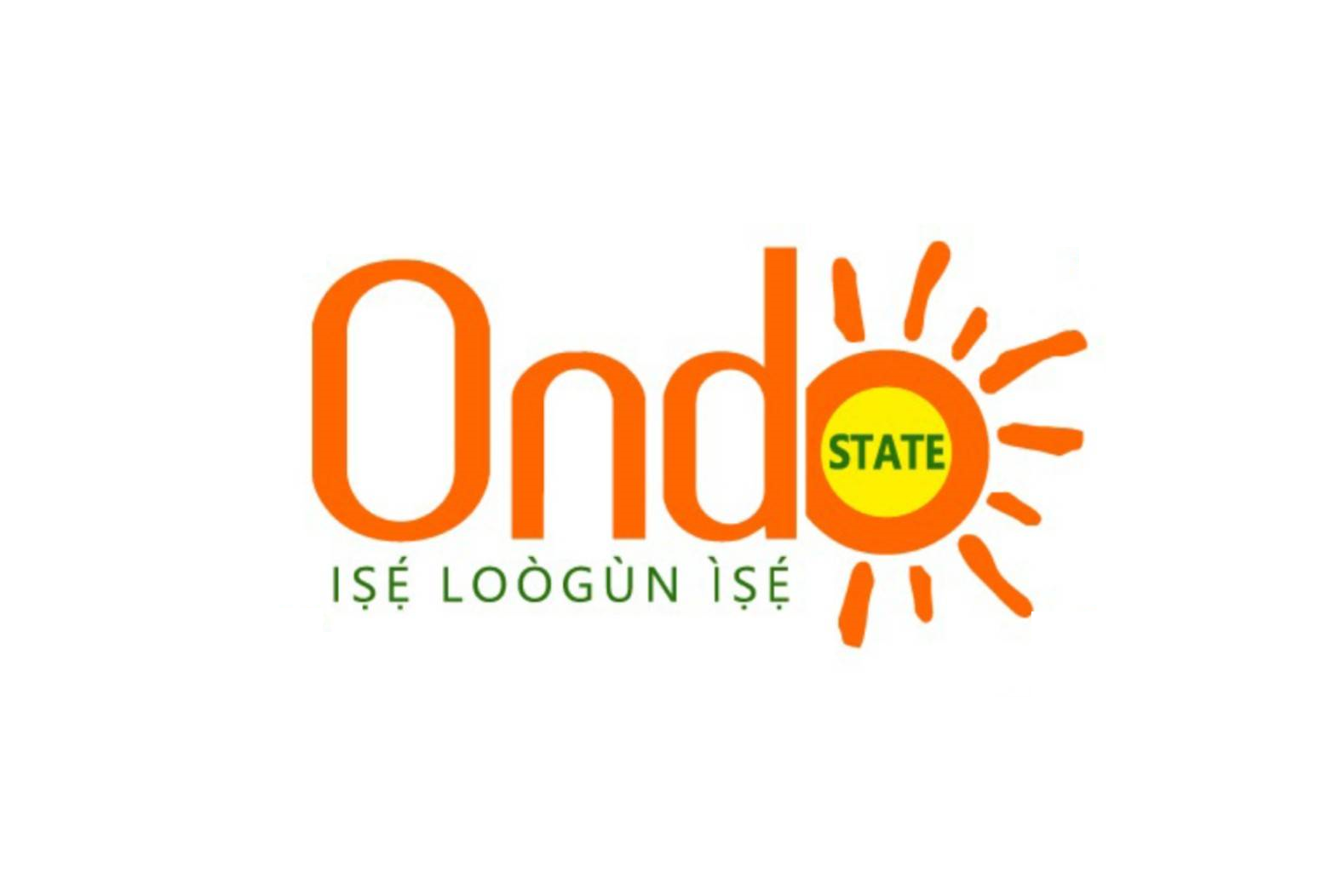
- Flag of Ondo State

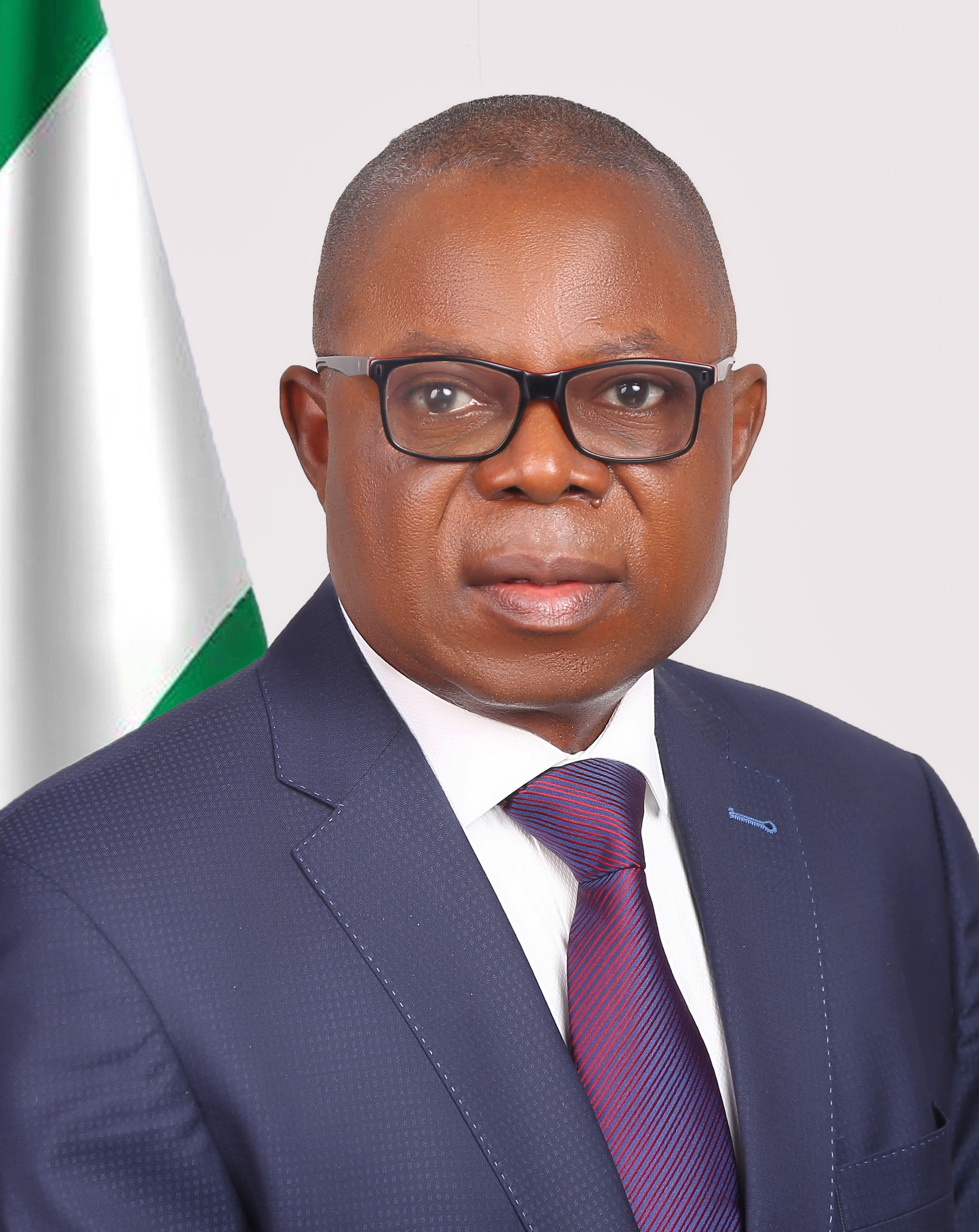
- Incumbent; Olayide Adelami since 1 February 2024
- Executive Branch of the Ondo State Government
- Style: Deputy Governor (informal); His Excellency (courtesy)
- Status: Second highest executive branch officer
- Member of: Ondo State Executive Branch; Ondo State Cabinet
- Seat: Akure
- Nominator: Gubernatorial candidate
- Appointer: Direct popular election or, if vacant, Governor via House of Assembly confirmation
- Term length: Four years renewable once
- Constituting instrument: Constitution of Nigeria
- Inaugural holder: Afolabi Iyantan (Fourth Republic)
- Succession: First
- Website: ondostate.gov.ng

The deputy governor of Ondo State is the second-highest officer in the executive branch of the government of Ondo State, Nigeria, after the governor of Ondo State, and ranks first in line of succession. The deputy governor is directly elected together with the governor to a four-year term of office.

Olayide Adelami is the current deputy governor, having assumed office on 1 February 2024.

== Qualifications ==
As in the case of the Governor, in order to be qualified to be elected as deputy governor, a person must:

- be at least thirty-five (35) years of age;
- be a Nigerian citizen by birth;
- be a member of a political party with endorsement by that political party;
- have School Certificate or its equivalent.

== Responsibilities ==
The deputy governor assists the governor in exercising primary assignments and is also eligible to replace a dead, impeached, absent or ill Governor as required by the 1999 Constitution of Nigeria.

== List of deputy governors ==
Name	Took office	Left office	Time in office	Party	Elected	Governor
Akin Omoboriowo (1932–2012)	1 October 1979	1 October 1983	4 years	Unity Party of Nigeria	1979	Michael Adekunle Ajasin
Olusegun Agagu (1948–2013)	3 January 1992	17 November 1993	1 year, 318 days	Social Democratic Party	1991	Bamidele Olumilua
Afolabi Iyantan (died 2005)	29 May 1999	29 May 2003	4 years	Alliance for Democracy	1999	Adebayo Adefarati
Omolade Oluwateru (born 1947)	29 May 2003	23 February 2009	5 years, 270 days	Peoples Democratic Party	2003; 2007	Olusegun Agagu
Ali Olanusi (born 1942)	24 February 2009	27 April 2015	6 years, 62 days	Labour Party	2012	Olusegun Mimiko
Lasisi Oluboyo (born 1961/1962)	27 April 2015	24 February 2017	1 year, 303 days	Peoples Democratic Party		Olusegun Mimiko
Agboola Ajayi (born 1968)	24 February 2017	24 February 2021	4 years	All Progressives Congress	2016	Rotimi Akeredolu
Lucky Aiyedatiwa (born 1965)	24 February 2021	27 December 2023	2 years, 306 days	All Progressives Congress	2020	Rotimi Akeredolu
Olayide Adelami (born 1958)	1 February 2024	Incumbent	2 years, 218 days	All Progressives Congress	2024	Lucky Aiyedatiwa

== See also ==
- List of governors of Ondo State
