= Abdul Azeez Kolawole Adeyemo =

Nigerian politician

Abdul Azeez Kolawole Adeyemo (14 June 1941 – 12 March 2002), popularly known as 'Alhaji how are you', was a Nigerian politician. He joined the Western Region campaign of Egbe Omo Oduduwa founded by Chief Jeremiah Obafemi Awolowo. He was also a front-line member of Action Group political party which later metamorphosed into Unity Party of Nigeria. His main legacy was securing democracy and good governance in post-independent Nigeria.

== Background and political life ==
Adeyemo was born on 14 June 1941 in Ado-Ekiti to Sir Rufai Adeyemo and Princess Adebolarin Agunsoye. Growing up as a Catholic during the British colonial era, he later converted to Islam. He was a clergyman, a painter, a successful business man, and an orator who assumed his first political office in the Second Republic as a Member of Parliament on 1 October 1979, when Alhaji Shehu Shagari was sworn in as the first civilian President and Commander-in-Chief of the Federal Republic of Nigeria. The government was later removed from power on New Year's Eve 1983 by Major General Muhammadu Buhari.

Adeyemo played a significant role as a campaign manager in the victory of the short-lived government of Bamidele Olumilua, governor of Ondo State from 1991 to 1993 under the umbrella of the Social Democratic Party. He later served in that administration as the Ondo State Parliamentary Co-ordinator and Liaison Officer.

The biggest challenge to Nigeria's journey toward social, economic, and political self-actualisation was epitomised by military president Ibrahim Babangida's annulment of the 12 June 1993 presidential election, which was won by Chief Moshood Kashimawo Olawale Abiola in a free and fair election. The annulment, coupled with the dissolution of the political parties, invariably led to the demise of civilian governments across the Federal Republic of Nigeria. The Nigerian dream of democratic sovereignty, to which Adeyemo remained absolutely committed, was cut short in a climate of indifference and cynicism. Justice was reduced to tokenism and cynical symbolism.

== Elder statesman ==
Adeyemo was also a renowned leader of the pan-Yoruba elders' consultative forum known as Afenifere. He played a significant role in the creation of Ekiti State in October 1996. Following the restoration of democracy in the late 1990s shortly after the sudden and mysterious death of the military dictator General Sani Abacha, Adeyemo remained politically active and assumed the status of a 'godfather' due to his considerable influence across the political landscape and oligarchy. This was exemplified by his pivotal role in the political aspirations of Otunba Adeniyi Adebayo, who became the first elected governor of Ekiti State under the platform of the Alliance for Democracy in 1999.

A shortlist of his political alliances includes Samuel Adekunle Ajasin JP, Alhaji Shehu Musa Yar'Adua, Alhaji Baba Gana Kingibe, Chief Olu Falae, General Adeyinka Adebayo, Evangelist Bamidele Olumilua, Olusegun Kokumo Agagu, Alhaji Abdulkadir Balarabe Musa, Pa Abraham Adesanya, T.Y. Danjuma, Alhaji Bamanga Tukur, Otunba Reuben Famuyibo, Adebayo Adefarati, Ebenezer Babatope, and Chief Bola Ige among others.

== Demise ==
Adeyemo died in hospital on 12 March 2002 after being rushed there due to complications from long-standing cardiovascular disease and protracted high blood pressure.
