= List of governors of Ondo State =

Nigerian state head of government

Governor of Ondo State
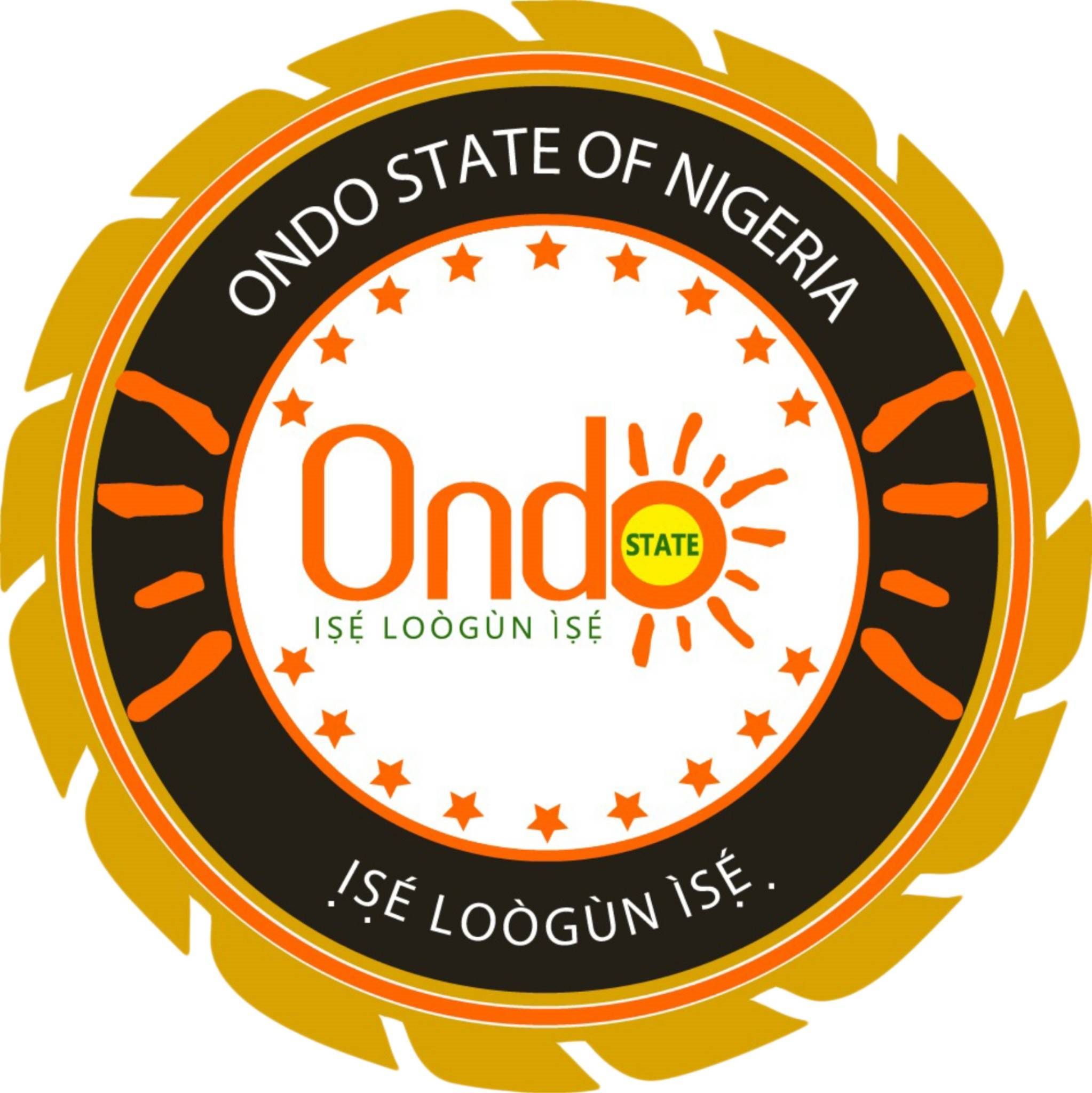
- Seal of Ondo State

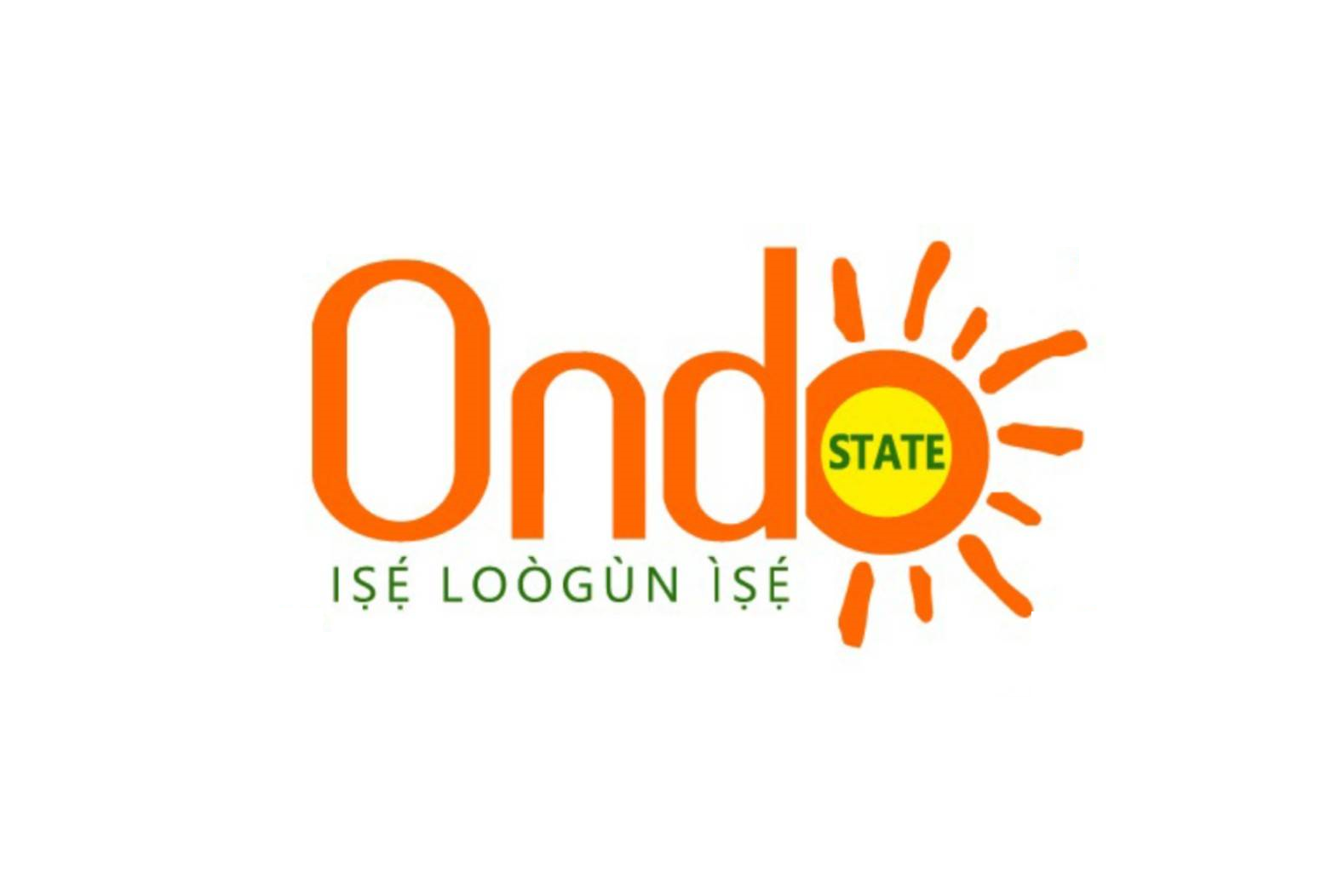
- Flag of Ondo State

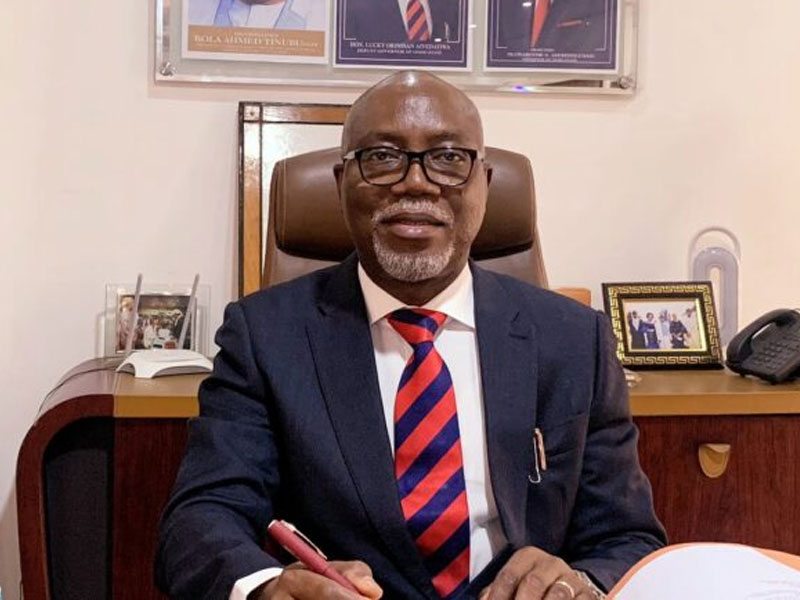
- Incumbent; Lucky Aiyedatiwa since 27 December 2023
- Executive Branch of the Ondo State Government
- Style: Governor (informal); His Excellency (courtesy)
- Type: Head of state; Head of government
- Member of: Ondo State Executive Branch; Ondo State Cabinet
- Residence: Ondo State Government House
- Seat: Akure
- Appointer: Direct popular election or via succession from deputy governorship
- Term length: Four years renewable once
- Constituting instrument: Constitution of Nigeria
- Inaugural holder: Ita David Ikpeme
- Formation: 3 February 1976 (50 years ago)
- Deputy: Deputy Governor of Ondo State
- Website: ondostate.gov.ng

The governor of Ondo State is the head of government of Ondo State in Nigeria. The governor is the head of the executive branch of the Ondo State Government. The governor has a duty to enforce state laws and the power to either approve or veto bills passed by the Ondo State House of Assembly, to convene the legislature and grant pardons.

When Ondo State was created from the Western State in 1976, Group Captain Ita David Ikpeme was appointed its first governor. Olusegun Mimiko served the longest term as governor, serving for two consecutive terms of 4 years from 2009 to 2017.

Since the creation of the state in 1976, 19 people have served as governor, 12 military governors and 7 civilian governors. Brigadier General Raji Rasaki served the shortest term in office of 7 months.

The current governor is Lucky Aiyedatiwa, who was sworn in on 27 December 2023 following the death of Rotimi Akeredolu.

== Governors ==
=== Military governors (1976–1979) ===
Ondo State was created on 3 February 1976 and General Olusegun Obasanjo appointed Ita David Ikpeme as military governor on 17 March 1976.

Governor			Term of office			Party	Ref.
No.	Portrait	Name (birth–death)	Took office	Left office	Time in office	Party	Ref.
1		Group Captain; Ita David Ikpeme	17 March 1976	24 July 1978	2 years, 129 days	Military	
2		Brigadier; Sunday Tuoyo (1935–2022)	24 July 1978	1 October 1979	1 year, 69 days	Military	

=== Second Republic (1979–1983) ===
Under the 1979 Constitution, the second constitution of the Federal Republic of Nigeria, the governor was both head of state and government. The governor was elected for a four-year term. In the event of a vacancy the deputy governor would have served as acting governor.

Governor			Term of office			Political party	Elected	Ref.
No.	Portrait	Name (birth–death)	Took office	Left office	Time in office	Political party	Elected	Ref.
3		Chief Michael Adekunle Ajasin (1908–1997)	1 October 1979	31 December 1983	4 years, 91 days	Unity Party of Nigeria	1979; 1983	

=== Military governors (1984–1992) ===
Major General Muhammadu Buhari was made military head of state following the coup d'ètat of 1983, which overthrew the Second Republic. He appointed his military governors in January 1984. He was in turn overthrown by General Ibrahim Babangida on 27 August 1985.

Governor			Term of office			Party	Ref.
No.	Portrait	Name (birth–death)	Took office	Left office	Time in office	Party	Ref.
4		Commodore; Michael Bamidele Otiko (1934–1999)	2 January 1984	2 September 1985	1 year, 7 months	Military	
5		Navy Captain; Michael Okhai Akhigbe (1946–2013)	2 September 1985	26 August 1986	11 months	Military	
6		Colonel; Ekundayo B. Opaleye (1946–2023)	26 August 1986	17 December 1987	1 year, 3 months	Military	
7		Brigadier General; Raji Alagbe Rasaki (born 1947)	17 December 1987	July 1988	7 months	Military	
8		Commodore; Bode George (born 1945)	July 1988	3 September 1990	2 years, 1 month	Military	
9		Navy Captain; Sunday Abiodun Olukoya (1949–2021)	3 September 1990	3 January 1992	1 year, 4 months	Military	

=== Third Republic (1992–1993) ===
Under the 1979 Constitution, the second constitution of the Federal Republic of Nigeria, the governor was both head of state and government. The governor was elected for a four-year term. In the event of a vacancy the deputy governor would have served as acting governor.

Governor			Term of office			Political party	Elected	Ref.
No.	Portrait	Name (birth–death)	Took office	Left office	Time in office	Political party	Elected	Ref.
10		Bamidele Olumilua (1940–2020)	3 January 1992	17 November 1993	1 year, 318 days	Social Democratic Party	1991	

=== Military administrators (1993–1999) ===
General Sani Abacha led the palace coup d'ètat of 1993 which overthrew the Third Republic. He appointed his military administrators in December 1993.

Administrator			Term of office			Party	Ref.
No.	Portrait	Name (birth–death)	Took office	Left office	Time in office	Party	Ref.
11		Colonel; Mike Torey (1950–2013)	9 December 1993	September 1994	9 months	Military	
12		Colonel; Ahmed Usman (1951–2021)	September 1994	22 August 1996	1 year, 11 months	Military	
13		Navy Captain; Anthony Onyearugbulem (1955–2002)	22 August 1996	7 August 1998	1 year, 11 months	Military	
14		Colonel; Moses Fasanya	7 August 1998	29 May 1999	9 months	Military	

=== Fourth Republic (1999–present) ===
Under the 1999 Constitution of the Federal Republic of Nigeria, the governor is both head of state and government. The governor is elected for a four-year term. In the event of a vacancy, the deputy governor would serve as acting governor.

Governor			Term of office			Political party	Elected	Ref.
No.	Portrait	Name (birth–death)	Took office	Left office	Time in office	Political party	Elected	Ref.
15		Chief Adebayo Adefarati (1931–2007)	29 May 1999	29 May 2003	4 years	Alliance for Democracy	1999	
16		Olusegun Agagu (1948–2013)	29 May 2003	23 February 2009	5 years, 270 days	Peoples Democratic Party	2003; 2007	
17		Olusegun Mimiko (born 1954)	24 February 2009	24 February 2017	8 years	Labour Party; Peoples Democratic Party	2012	
18		Rotimi Akeredolu (1956–2023)	24 February 2017	27 December 2023	6 years, 306 days	All Progressives Congress	2016; 2020	
19		Lucky Aiyedatiwa (born 1965)	27 December 2023	Incumbent	2 years, 254 days	All Progressives Congress	2024	

== See also ==
- States of Nigeria
- List of state governors of Nigeria
