= 1983 Ondo State gubernatorial election =

1983 gubernatorial election in Ondo State, Nigeria

- August 13, 1983
Nominee	Michael Adekunle Ajasin
Party	UPN
Elected Governor
Michael Adekunle Ajasin
UPN

The 1983 Ondo State gubernatorial election occurred on August 13, 1983. UPN candidate Michael Adekunle Ajasin won the election.

== Results ==
Michael Adekunle Ajasin representing UPN won the election. The election held on August 13, 1983.
