= Sam Maris University =

Private university in Ondo State, Nigeria

- Motto: Liberty, Truth and Knowledge
- Type: Private university
- Established: 15 May 2023; 3 years ago
- Founders: Samuel Tomi Ologunorisa SAN
- Affiliations: National Universities Commission
- Chairman: Alhaji Ali Olanusi
- Vice-Chancellor: Francis A. Gbore
- Location: Supare Akoko, Ondo State, Nigeria; 7°27′15″N 5°41′41″E
- Campus: Urban
- Website: www.sammarisuniversity.edu.ng

Sam Maris University (SMU) is a private university located in Supare Akoko, Ondo State, Nigeria. The university's main campus and lecture theaters are situated there.

== History ==
The university was established on 15 May 2023.

A Senior Advocate of Nigeria who hails from Supare-Akoko, Tomi Ologunorisa, is the founder of Sam Maris University, and serves as the chairman of the Board of Trustees and the Visitor of the institution.

In 2024, the school began construction on a 150-room hostel to the university campus.

== Gallery ==
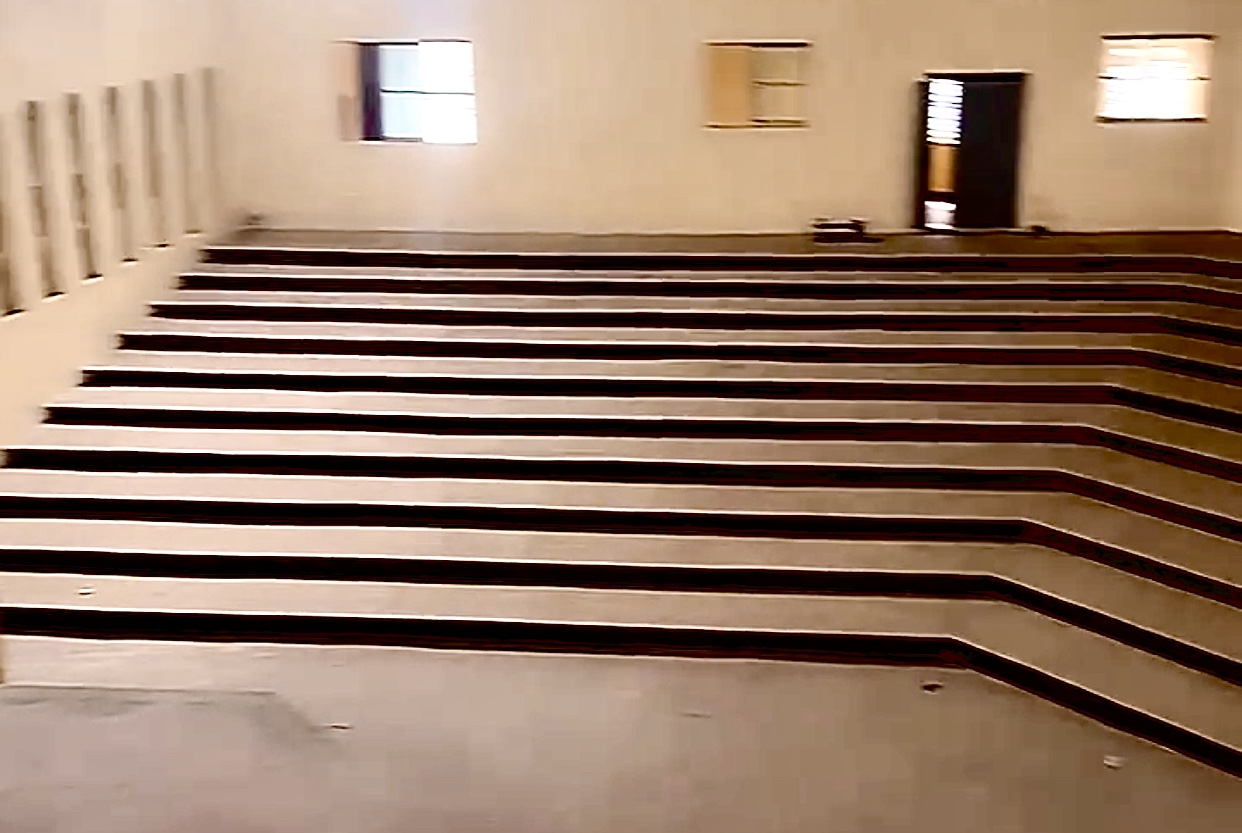
Lecture theatre at the Faculty of Law

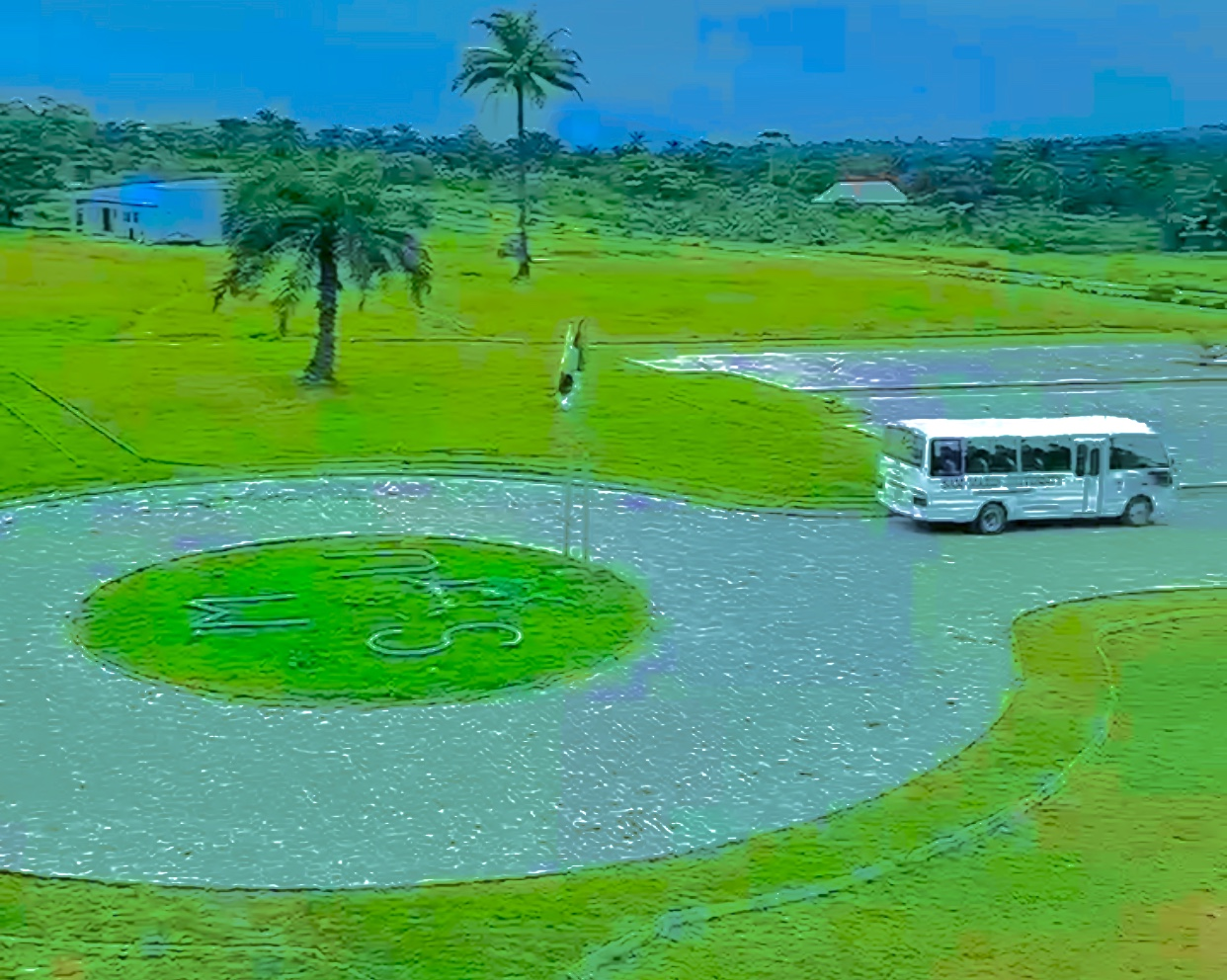
Exterior of Faculty of Law building

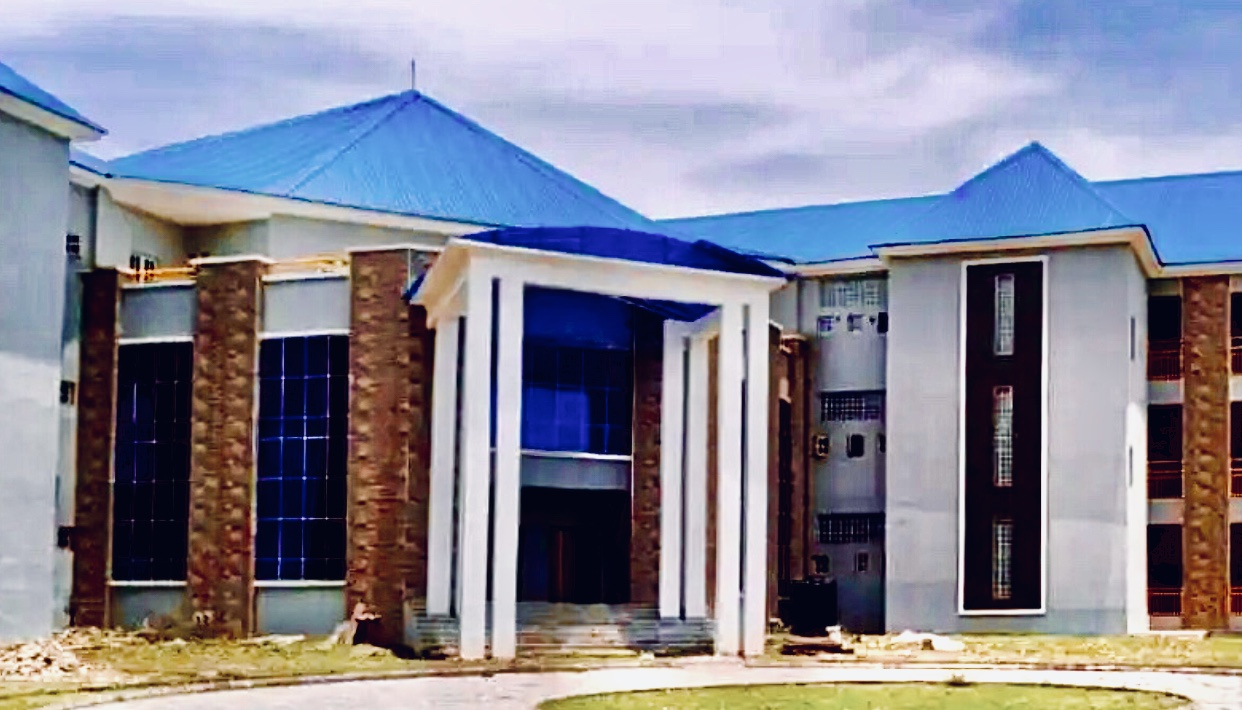
Front view of the Faculty of Law
