= 2003 Ondo State gubernatorial election =

2003 gubernatorial election in Ondo State, Nigeria

- (Nigeria)
- April 19, 2003
Nominee	Olusegun Agagu	Adebayo Adefarati
Party	PDP	AD
Running mate	Omolade Oluwateru
Popular vote	655,968	233,900
Governor before election
Adebayo Adefarati
AD
Elected Governor
Olusegun Agagu
PDP

The 2003 Ondo State gubernatorial election occurred on April 19, 2003. PDP's Olusegun Agagu, a former Deputy Governor to Bamidele Olumilua, won election for a first tenure, defeating Incumbent Governor, AD's Adebayo Adefarati and three other candidates.

Olusegun Agagu emerged winner in the PDP gubernatorial primary election. His running mate was Omolade Oluwateru.

== Electoral system ==
The Governor of Ondo State is elected using the plurality voting system.

== Results ==
A total of five candidates registered with the Independent National Electoral Commission to contest in the election. PDP candidate Olusegun Agagu won election for a first tenure, defeating AD Incumbent Governor, Adebayo Adefarati, and three other candidates.

The total number of registered voters in the state was 1,504,181. However, only 63.83% (i.e. 960,080) of registered voters participated in the excerise.

Candidate	Party	Votes	%
Olusegun Agagu	People's Democratic Party (PDP)	655,968	73.72
Adebayo Adefarati	Alliance for Democracy (AD)	233,900	26.28
Jimoh Ibrahim	All Nigeria Peoples Party (ANPP)		
United Nigeria People's Party (UNPP)			
Felix Dele Akintomide	ARP		
Total		889,868	100.00
Registered voters/turnout		1,504,181	–
Source: Gamji, Africa Update, Dawodu
