= Jamiu Omoniyi =

Nigerian banking and finance specialist and politician

Hon. Jamiu Jagunmolu Akande Omoniyi

Commissioner for Housing of Ogun State
- Incumbent
- Assumed office 10 January 2020
- Governor: Dapo Abiodun

Personal details
- Born: Ogun State, Nigeria
- Education: Ondo State Polytechnic
- Occupation: Banking and finance specialist, politician

Jamiu Jagunmolu Akande Omoniyi is a Nigerian banking and finance specialist and politician. He has served as Commissioner for Housing in Ogun State since January 2020.

== Early life and education ==
Omoniyi is a native of the Yewa area of Ogun State. During his early years, he worked alongside his father, who was a bricklayer. He obtained a Higher National Diploma in Accountancy from Ondo State Polytechnic, Owo, in 1999.

== Career ==
Omoniyi began his career at Berger Paints Nigeria Plc, where he worked from 1995 to October 2000 as an Account Clerk. He later joined Germaine Haulage & Distribution Services (2001–2003), before moving to Partnership Savings & Loans (2003–2005). He subsequently worked at Wema Homes Savings & Loans, a subsidiary of Wema Bank Plc, between 2005 and March 2007. In these roles, he worked in the accounting departments of the organisations.

=== Political career ===
In July 2019, Omoniyi was appointed Special Adviser on Housing to the Governor of Ogun State. Later in November 2019, he became a member of the Board of Directors at Gateway Mortgage Bank and joined Ogun State's Project Review Committee for infrastructural oversight (2012–2019).

On 10 January 2020, Governor Dapo Abiodun appointed him Commissioner for Housing, a position he continues to hold.
