= Associated Aviation =

IATA	ICAO	Call sign
-	SCD	ASSOCIATED
- Founded: 1996
- Hubs: Murtala Muhammed International Airport
- Fleet size: 2
- Parent company: Associated Aviation Limited
- Headquarters: Ikeja, Lagos State, Nigeria
- Website: flyassociated.com

Associated Aviation was an airline based in Ikeja, Lagos State, Nigeria. It was established in 1996 and operates passenger and cargo services within Nigeria and in West Africa. Its main base was Murtala Mohammed International Airport, Lagos. As of June 2019, it is no longer operational.

== History ==
The Nigerian government set a deadline of April 30, 2007 for all airlines operating in the country to re-capitalise or be grounded, in an effort to ensure better services and safety. The airline satisfied the Nigerian Civil Aviation Authority (NCAA)’s criteria in terms of re-capitalization and was re-registered for operation. In July 2008 the company was sold to a group of investors who have launched a major route expansion and acquisition of new aircraft from Embraer.

== Destinations ==
Associated Aviation served the following destinations as of January 2009:

- Abuja
- Benin
- Calabar
- Ibadan
- Jeddah
- Lagos
- Makurdi

== Fleet ==
The Associated Aviation fleet consisted of the following aircraft (as of March 2025):

- 1 Embraer ERJ 145

== Former Fleet ==
Embraer EMB 120 Brasilia 5N-BJY crashed in Associated Aviation Flight 361

== Accidents ==
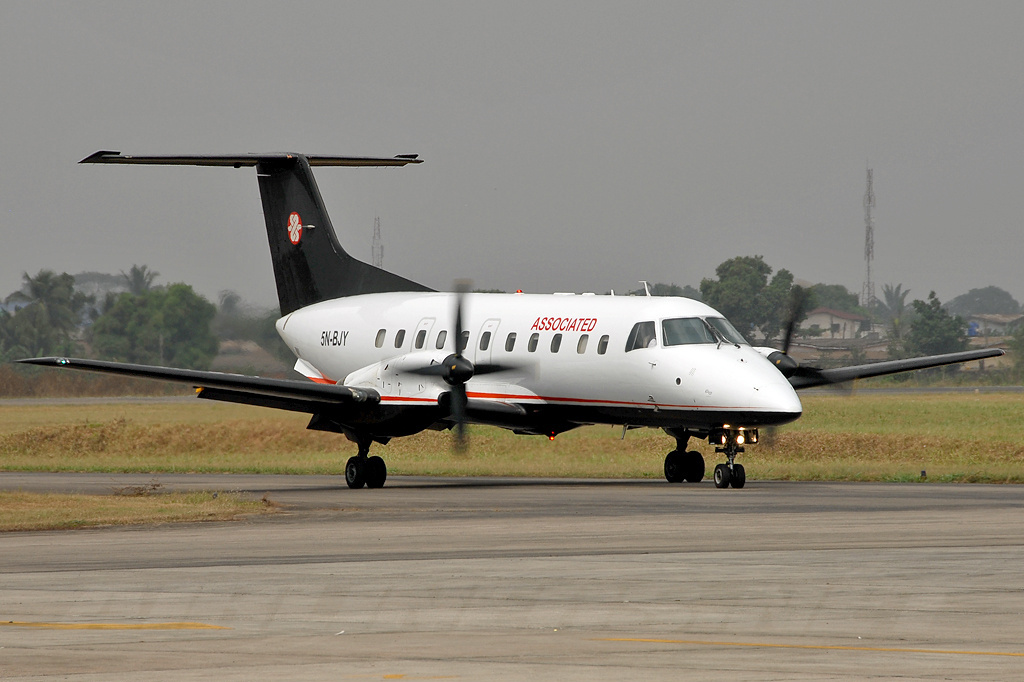
The EMB 120 Associated Aviation 5N-BJY.

- On 3 October 2013, Associated Aviation Flight 361 operated by an Embraer EMB 120 Brasilia crashed on take off from Lagos Airport bound for Akure. The aircraft was on a charter flight taking the body of the former Governor of Ondo State, Dr. Olusegun Agagu for burial. The aircraft had 20 people on board and at least 16 of them died.
