= Akin Omoboriowo =

Nigerian politician

Akinwole Michael Omoboriowo

Deputy Governor of Ondo State
- In office October 1979 – October 1983

Personal details
- Born: 12 January 1932
- Died: 10 April 2012 (aged 80)

Akinwole Michael Omoboriowo (12 January 1932 – 10 April 2012) was a Nigerian lawyer and politician who was Deputy Governor of Ondo State, later switching parties and contested for the governorship election of 1983 in Ondo State during the Nigerian Second Republic. He was initially declared the winner but was disputed and later reversed by a court of appeal before he could take office.

Omoboriowo was elected deputy governor on the Unity Party of Nigeria (UPN) platform, running with Michael Adekunle Ajasin, who became governor. He claimed that he should have been UPN candidate for governor, since he had won more votes that Ajasin in the primaries, but that the UPN leaders had rigged the results. During his period as deputy governor, he fell out with Governor Ajasin, who refused to swear him into power as acting governor when Ajasin was away from the state.

Omoboriowo switched to the National Party of Nigeria (NPN) and ran against his old boss in the 1983 elections. This came on the heels of the latter's refusal to step aside from the gubernatorial race as previously allegedly agreed between Omoboriowo and Ajasin. Omoboriowo and certain other stalwarts of the party including Chief S.A. Akerele against popular sentiment, left for the ruling NPN under which he ran for the guber seat. When the federal Electoral Commission declared Omoboriowo the winner on 16 August 1983, the announcement sparked deadly riots. The riots were reportedly the most violent in the history of post-independence Yoruba-land second only to the "Wet è" riots. The riots, particularly aimed at NPN stalwarts and sympathisers claimed lives and properties of prominent individuals. Chiefs Omoboriowo and Akerele were spared though Akerele's house was razed to the ground by irate rioters (Akerele had at the time fled with his family to Kwara state). In the same riots, Chief Olaiya Fagbamigbe of Fagbemigbe publishers was killed as well as Hon. Kunle Agunbiade. An unverified version of events states that Agunbiade was beheaded and his head was taken on a plate to certain UPN leaders.

In the midst of the political saga, Omoboriowo had the support of the Ondo state house of assembly. Upon his resignation as deputy governor, Chief Ajasin twice presented the name of Dr. N.F. Aina to the House for ratification as Omoboriowo's replacement- a request that was repeatedly turned down by the house in apparent solidarity to Omoboriowo

His election was disputed, and was reversed by an electoral court of appeal before he was inaugurated, with Ajasin being reinstated in office. After the coup on 31 December 1983 that brought General Muhammadu Buhari to power, he was jailed, as were almost all the former governors and their deputies, but was then released without charge in less than 30 days. He would later state that Buhari was right to have jailed him and the others at the time.

Omoboriowo was an Awoist. He authored and published a book on themes on Awoism for which he came under severe criticism from other Awoists who saw the work as a crude attempt by an under-achiever to suck-up to Baba Awo. Still, Baba Awo (as Obafemi Awolowo was called) was fond of him and kept checking up on him. Indeed, Omoboriowo claimed in an interview with the Sun that Awolowo had said that of all the candidates in the '79 elections, he (Omoboriowo) was the only one who wasn't spurred by monetary desires. Expectedly though, his relationship with Awolowo (at least, politically) soured upon his decamp from the UPN.

In the NPN, Omoboriowo met and bonded with other Nigerian political icons one of whom was Dim Chukwuemeka Odimegwu-Ojukwu with whom he was friends until the latter's death in late 2011.

Chief Omoboriowo retired from partisan politics soon after the second republic but continued to contribute to the Nigerian political terrain. He was a member of the 1996 constitutional conference and member of the 1997/98 National Reconciliation Committee

Later he became Pro-chancellor and Chairman of the governing council of the University of Ado Ekiti. Most recently, he was Chairman of an Electrical Company, Genesis Electricity situated in Abuja where he was based for a stretch of time before he died.

In the twilight of his life Omoboriowo found solace in religion and became an unashamed, professing born-again Christian. He punctuated almost every sentence with a reference to God and lived under the radar in service to God till he died. In an interview, he said "I am a rigorous Christian, worshipping at Christ Praise Assembly in Abuja. I belong to the end time church."

In early 2012, Akin Omoboriowo and his wife moved back to his home state Ekiti. In April 2012, he took ill and was taken to a Lagos hospital for medical care. It was there that he died on 10 April 2012 though information of his death did not make the news until the following afternoon. Certain sources say that he died from internal bleeding as a complication caused of the prostate cancer he had been fighting. His family did not however confirm that information. He is survived by a wife, five children and a host of grandchildren

Upon his death, so many encomiums poured in from all quarters. Ovation Magazine publisher, Dele Momodu tweeted "the elephant has fallen" while the Nigerian President, Goodluck Jonathan referred to him as a "politician who was not afraid to stand for his political beliefs"
