= Afenifere =

Yoruba socio-cultural organization

Afenifere is a socio-cultural organization for the Yoruba people of Nigeria, with Chief Abraham Adesanya as its leader and Chief Bola Ige as deputy leader. Other founding members were Pa Onasanya, Chief Reuben Fasoranti, Adegbonmire, Okurounmu Femi, Ganiyu Dawodu, Olanihun Ajayi, Olu Falae, Adebayo Adefarati, Alhaji Adeyemo and Ayo Adebanjo. When the Alliance for Democracy (AD) political party was formed in 1998, it took the Afenifere agenda as its official manifesto.

Following a poor performance in the April 2003 elections, in late 2003 rival factions of the AD held separate conventions. In the Lagos convention, Adebisi Akande was elected as AD chairman. In January 2006, the convoy of AD leaders who supported Chief Mojisoluwa Akinfenwa as the party's national chairman was attacked by thugs in Osogbo, the capital of Osun State.

In 2008, the Afenifere Renewal Group (alias ARG) was formed with the stated intent of reuniting the feuding factions, but perhaps as an alternative to the faction headed by the older generation of leaders. In November 2008, a faction of Afenifere in Ijebu Igbo, Ogun State, led by Chief Ayo Adebanjo, installed Chief Reuben Fasoranti as the new chairman of the group. ARG Leaders including Senator Olabiyi Durojaiye, Chief Bisi Akande, Wale Oshun and Yinka Odumakin stated that they did not accept the move.

In October 2009, a spokesman for the ARG spoke out against plans to deregulate the domestic fuel market. That month, the ARG hailed the conviction of Chief Bode George and five others as an important step towards freeing Nigeria of corruption.

A majority of the Yorubas see the pressure group as a legitimate force that is both serving their interests and maintaining the waning influence of Yorubaland in the Federation. They consider it to be a necessary body to preserve the ethnic identity of the Yorubas.

== Criticism ==
There are some voices among the Yorubas that see the organization as a dangerous group. Responding to some questions by his followers at his London Awqaf Africa College, prominent Yoruba Muslim cleric Sheikh Dr. Abu-Abdullah Adelabu described Afenifere as a bunch of tribalists and self-serving ambitious, greedy rivals driven by xenophobia and deep bigotry, and possessed by a delusion of their so-called cultural commonalities. Sheikh Adelabu, who founded the Awqaf Africa Society in London, said the only logic behind the Yoruba socio-cultural organization is that Afenifere exhibits the very paranoia that has made the Nigerians so hopeless and the Yoruba politicians so careless.
