= Dele Momodu =

Nigerian journalist/ CEO of Ovation International

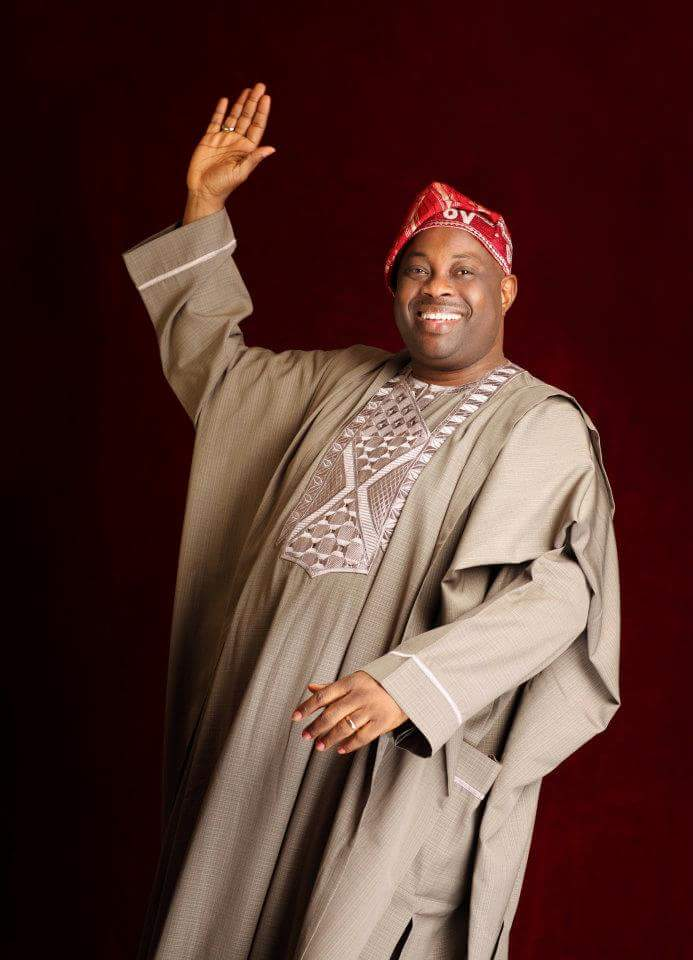

Personal details
- Born: 16 May 1960 (age 66) Ile-Ife, Osun State, Nigeria
- Education: Master of Arts degree in English Literature
- Alma mater: Obafemi Awolowo University
- Occupation: Journalist/CEO

Chief Dele Momodu (born Ayọ̀bámidélé Àbáyọ̀mí Ojútẹlẹ́gàn Àjàní Momodu; 16 May 1960) is a Nigerian journalist, publisher, businessman, and motivational speaker. He is the CEO and publisher of Ovation International, a celebrity magazine. In 2015, he officially launched Ovation TV and subsequently launched an online newspaper called The Boss Newspaper. Momodu has received hundreds of awards and honors for his work in the world of business, politics, literature, the music industry and the fashion industry. He writes a weekly column called "Pendulum", published every Saturday on the back page of ThisDay newspaper. The articles have been praised for highlighting topical national issues in Nigeria, as well as discussing popular topics, current events and notable people, often in a polemic/critical style.

== Early life ==
Momodu was born on 16 May 1960. His name, Ayòbámidélé, means "my joy has followed me home." He is the last of three siblings. He lost his father at the age of 13, thereafter relying on his mother and relatives for support. Momodu was taught by his late mother, who died on 18 May 2007, not to despair even when times are tough. This was exemplified by her continual support of him even when others had written him off. She had given him a third chance at passing his WAEC (senior secondary exams). Although his mother's source of income was from petty trading, and she had two older children Dr. Oladele B. Ajayi and Debbie Ajayi to care for, she labored hard to sustain her family, and in the words of Momodu, "she didn't give up on me."

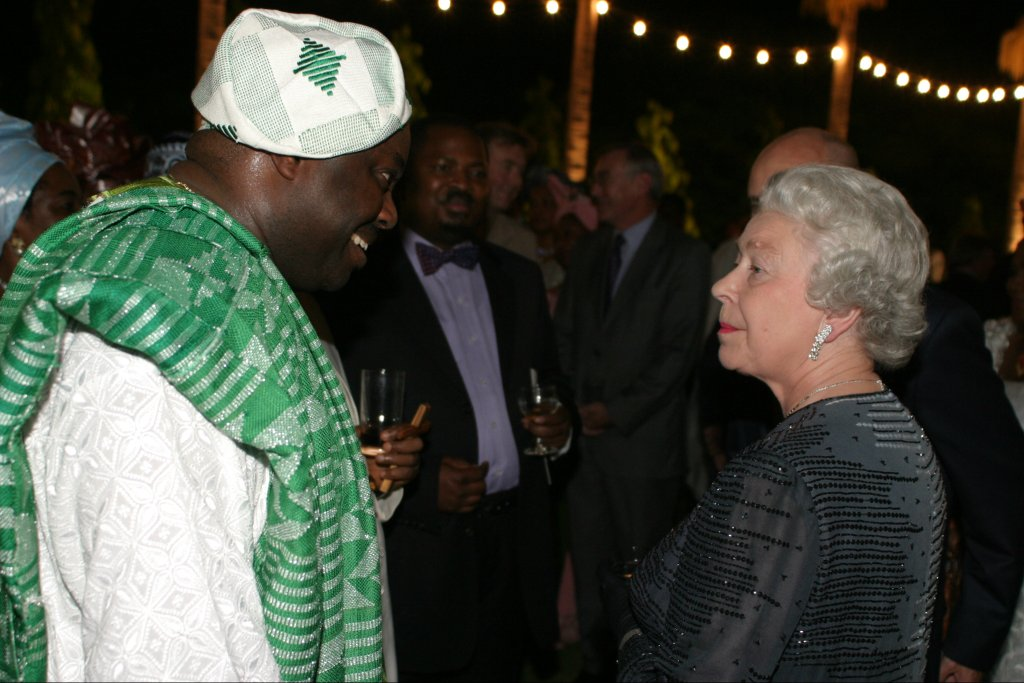
Dele Momodu and Queen Elizabeth II

== Education and career ==
A graduate of University of Ife, (now Obafemi Awolowo University, Ile-Ife) 1982, Momodu holds a degree in Yoruba and a master's degree in English Literature (1988). He lectured at the Oyo State College of Arts and Science in Ile-Ife, between 1982 and 1983 while on National Service. Between 1983 and 1985, he was private secretary to the former Deputy Governor of Ondo State, Chief Akin Omoboriowo. In 1986, Momodu served the Ooni of Ife, Oba Okunade Sijuwade Olubuse II, managing the Motel Royal Limited owned by the monarch. Following Momodu's resignation from the Motel Royal, he went on to study for his post-graduate degree in English literature. He was during this time contributing articles to the likes of The Guardian, Sunday Tribune and other Nigerian-based publications. On 30 July 2016, Momodu was awarded with an honorary doctorate degree (PhD) from the University of Professional Studies, Accra, Ghana, earning him the title "Doctor of Humane Letters".

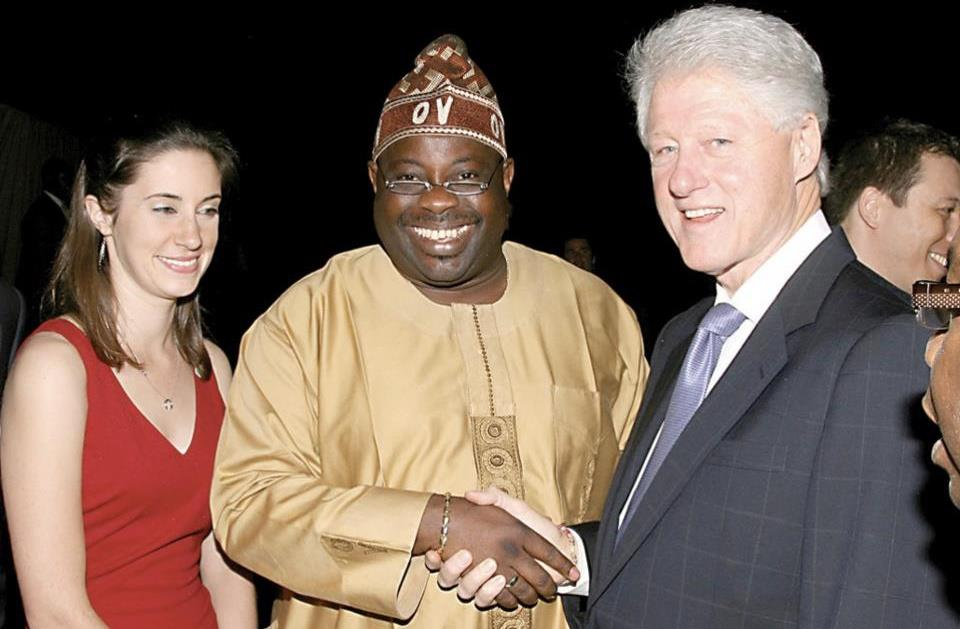
Dele Momodu and former President Bill Clinton

In May 1988, Momodu got his first job as staff writer with African Concord magazine, owned by Moshood Kashimawo Olawale Abiola. A year later, Momodu was transferred to Weekend Concord as a pioneer staff. He wrote the first cover story for the paper in March 1989. He also contributed to other publications such as the National Concord, Sunday Concord, Business Concord and the Yoruba newspaper Isokan. In May 1989, he became literary editor, within six months he became news editor of the Weekend Concord. Between May 1990 and September 1991 he edited May Ellen Ezekiel's Classique, a celebrity magazine, an appointment that made him the highest paid editor in Nigeria. He resigned and tried his hand at doing business as a bread distributor for his mentor Moshood Abiola, who owned "Wonderloaf". Following this, Momodu started a public relations outfit, Celebrities-Goodwill Limited, which managed the accounts of Moshood Abiola, Mike Adenuga, Hakeem Belo-Osagie etc.

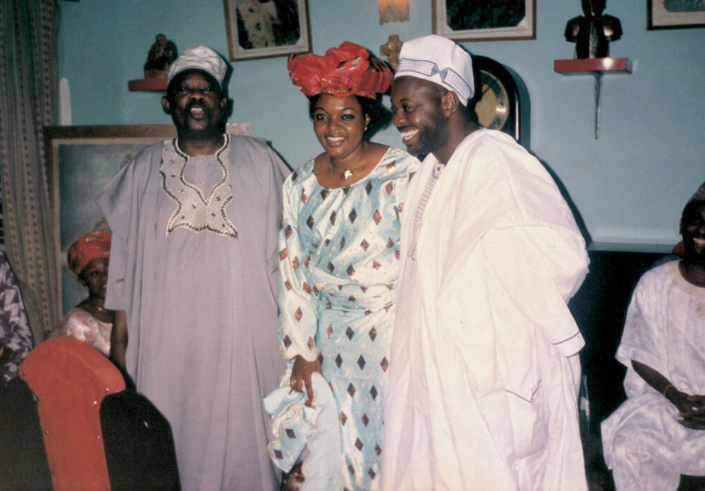
Dele and his wife, Bolaji with the late Chief M. K. O. Abiola

== Exile ==
In 1993, Momodu resigned to join the Moshood Abiola presidential campaign organization. Momodu was arrested and detained at Alagbon Close in Lagos, after the annulment of the 12 June presidential election by General Ibrahim Babangida. He was punished by the reigning dictatorship for his pro-democratic views but was undeterred. He was to be arrested in 1995 and charged with treason by the government of Sani Abacha, then a dictator. Momodu was accused of being one of the brains behind the pirate radio station, Radio Freedom (later Radio Kudirat), after the murder of Alhaja Kudirat Abiola. Momodu managed to escape by masquerading as a farmer through the Seme border into Cotonou, in Benin Republic, from where he fled to Togo, Ghana and eventually to the United Kingdom. For three agonising years, he could not re-enter his homeland, Nigeria. He has since been absolved of all accusations made by the Abacha administration, which are believed to have been orchestrated by Abacha's anti-democratic administration Momodu opposed with his support of MKO Abiola's campaign.

== Ovation International ==
Momodu started Ovation International in 1996 while still in exile. After the death of Abiola in prison, and the subsequent death of his military ruler Sani Abacha, Momodu ended his exile. Since then, he has expanded Ovation International, and which is now one of Africa's most popular celebrity magazines. Ovation International is also reputed to be the only bilingual magazine in Africa, having editions printed in both English and French.

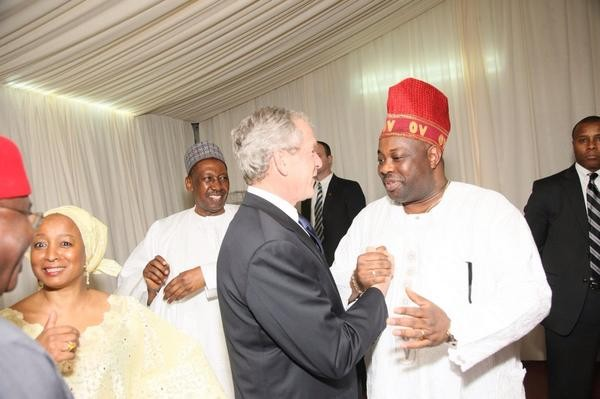
Dele Momodu with President George W. Bush

== Ovation Red Carol ==
Momodu has held an annual event since 2008, known as the Ovation Red Carol (later changed to Ovation Carol and Awards). The Red Carol is held every December, and has become one of West Africa's most popular annual Christmas events, often involving musical performances, drama, fashion shows and award presentations for varying charitable causes. From 2008 to 2012 it was held in Lagos, Nigeria, but was held in Accra, Ghana, in December 2013. In 2013, former president of Ghana J. J. Rawlings attended, with Wyclef Jean as the headline act, along with many other international performers, including MI, Ice Prince and Burna Boy from Nigeria. In 2015, two shows were held for the first time – one in Lagos, Nigeria and the other in Accra, with Nigerian performer Wizkid headlining both events, as well as American singer Evelyn "Champagne" King for the Lagos show. The 2016 show was held in Lagos at Eko Hotel & Suites, with Ovation presenter Daala Oruwari and actor Richard Mofe Damijo serving as co-hosts. Korede Bello, Flavour N'abania, Reekado Banks, King Sunny Ade and Simi all performed at the Globacom-sponsored event, and was attended by Ghanaian President John Dramani Mahama. A video tribute was held for the late producer OJB Jezreel in the presence of his family. The 2017 show featured performances from Tiwa Savage, 2baba, Davido, Sinach, Sammie Okposo, D'banj, DJ Cuppy, Banky W, Sir Shina Peters and Ebenezer Obey, and was attended by guests including Femi Otedola and Aliko Dangote. The 2018 edition, sponsored by the Esther Ajayi Foundation, featured an all-star lineup including Burna Boy, Adekunle Gold, Mr Eazi, Falz, DJ Cuppy, Teni, Mayorkun, Yinka Ayefele, Sinach, Sammie Okposo and more.

== Political career ==
Momodu officially indicated his interest to run for the position of president of the federal republic of Nigeria under the Labour Party, during the 2011 presidential election cycle in September 2010. However, the Labour Party would drop out of the presidential race and he would end up running under the platform of the National Conscience Party, losing to Goodluck Jonathan in the general elections. He would later describe this presidential race as being borne out of frustration.

In February 2022, Momodu declared his intention to run for president of Nigeria, on the platform of the main opposition party, the Peoples Democratic Party.

== Family and personal life ==
On 19 December 1992, Momodu married Mobolaji Abiodun. They have four children: Pekan (born 1994), Yole (born 1996), Eniafe (born 1997) and Korewa (born 2004).
