= Abdukadir Abdulsalam =

Nigerian politician

Chairman of the Labour Party
- Succeeded by: Julius Abure

Personal details
- Party: Labour Party

Abdulkadir Abdulsalam was a Nigerian politician, who served as Chairman of the Labour Party.

Abdulsalam died in Abuja on 29 December 2020.
