= Ali Olanusi =

Nigerian politician (born 1942)

Deputy Governor of Ondo State
- In office 24 February 2009 – 27 April 2015
- Governor: Olusegun Mimiko
- Preceded by: Omolade Oluwateru
- Succeeded by: Lasisi Oluboyo

Personal details
- Born: 28 February 1942 (age 84) Supare Akoko, Southern Region, British Nigeria (now in Ondo State, Nigeria)
- Occupation: Politician; technocrat; administrator

Ali Olanusi (born 28 February 1942) is a Nigerian politician, he was deputy governor of Ondo State, Nigeria from February 2009 till his impeachment in April 2015.

== Early life ==
Ali Olanusi was born in Supare Akoko, a town in Akoko South West Local Government Area of Ondo State, southwestern Nigeria. He attended Ansarudeen College, Ikare where he obtained the West Africa School Certificate. On completion of his secondary education, he was employed as a teacher at modern school in Ogbagi, Ondo State but left the school to join the services of Lagos State Ministry of Transport. Although he had no degree certificate, according to him “My greatest regret in life is that I am not a graduate. It is the fact that I did not have a degree certificate from any university within or outside Nigeria. However, I don’t have inferiority complex”.

== Political life ==
He began his political career as a member of the Unity Party of Nigeria before he joined the Social Democratic Party and was a founding member of the Peoples Democratic Party. On 24 February 2009, he was sworn in as the deputy governor of Ondo State on the platform of the Labour Party after the previous deputy governor Omolade Oluwateru's reelection was notified by a Court of Appeal. He was re-elected again on the same platform in October 2012. On Thursday 26 March 2015, he defected to the All Progressives Congress having previously defected with governor Olusegun Mimiko from the Labour Party to the Peoples Democratic Party in October 2014. He was impeached by the Ondo State House of Assembly on 27 April 2015, following his defection from the Peoples Democratic Party to the All Progressives Congress a month earlier. His impeachment was nullified by a Court of Appeal on 24 March 2017.
