= 1979 Ondo State gubernatorial election =

1979 gubernatorial election in Ondo State, Nigeria

- July 28, 1979
Nominee	Michael Adekunle Ajasin
Party	UPN
Elected Governor
Michael Adekunle Ajasin
UPN

The 1979 Ondo State gubernatorial election occurred on July 28, 1979. UPN candidate Michael Adekunle Ajasin won the election.

== Results ==
Michael Adekunle Ajasin representing UPN won the election. The election held on July 28, 1979.
