= 2012 Ondo State gubernatorial election =

2012 gubernatorial election in Ondo State, Nigeria

- (Nigeria)
- October 20, 2012
Nominee	Olusegun Mimiko	Olusola Oke
Party	LP	PDP
Running mate	Ali Olanusi
Popular vote	260,199	155,961
Percentage	43.79%	26.25%
Governor before election
Olusegun Mimiko
LP
Elected Governor
Olusegun Mimiko
LP

The 2012 Ondo State gubernatorial election occurred on October 20, 2012. Incumbent governor, LP's Olusegun Mimiko won election for a second term, defeating other party candidates. Mimiko received 43.79% of the total vote and won in 13 of the state's 18 LGAs, closely followed by PDP's Olusola Oke who won in two LGAs with 26.25% of total votes, while the ACN candidate, Rotimi Akeredolu, who won in three LGAs came third with 24.15% of the votes. Mimiko becomes the first Incumbent governor of Ondo State to be re-elected.

Olusegun Mimiko was the LP nominee at the primary election. His running mate was Ali Olanusi.

== Electoral system ==
The Governor of Ondo State is elected using the plurality voting system.

== Results ==
A total of 13 candidates registered with the Independent National Electoral Commission. LP candidate Olusegun Mimiko won the election for a second term, defeating other party candidates. Mimiko received 43.79% of the votes, defeating PDP candidate, Olusola Oke with 26.25% and ACN candidate Rotimi Akeredolu with 24.15%.

The total number of registered voters was 1,638,950, while the accredited voters were 645,597. The total votes cast was 624,659, of which 594,244 were valid votes and 30,415 were invalid votes. From across the 18 LGAs, 49.80% of the voters were male, while 50.20% were female.

Candidate	Party	Votes	%
Olusegun Rahman Mimiko	Labour Party (Nigeria) (LP)	260,199	43.79
Olusola Alex Oke	People's Democratic Party	155,961	26.25
Oluwarotimi Odunayo Akeredolu	Action Congress of Nigeria (ACN)	143,512	24.15
Victor O. Adetusin	PDC	21,361	3.59
Ola G. Festus	Better Nigeria People's Party (BNPP)	2,949	0.50
Ehinlawo Olusola	Congress for Progressive Change (CPC)	1,931	0.32
Adeuti S. Taiyo	ACPN	1,806	0.30
Omoregha O. Kris	PPA	1,651	0.28
Ade Bolarinwa	All Nigeria Peoples Party (ANPP)	1,461	0.25
Abikanlu J. Olusola	NSDP	1,103	0.19
Oladapo B. Lawrence	NCP	823	0.14
Ola T. Adegoroye	APS	751	0.13
Omoyele A. Olorinmiga	CAP	735	0.12
Total		594,243	100.00
Valid votes		594,243	95.13
Invalid/blank votes		30,415	4.87
Total votes		624,658	100.00
Registered voters/turnout		1,638,597	38.12
Source: Vanguard, Daily Post, Channels TV

=== By local government area ===
Here are the results of the election by local government area for the two major parties. 13 political parties participated in the election. Yellow represents LGAs won by Olusegun Mimiko. Green represents LGAs won by Oke.

LGA	Olusegun Mimiko LP		Olusola Oke PDP		Total votes
LGA	#	%	#	%	#
Akoko North East	12,153		6,847		
Akoko North West	11,675		7,847		
Akoko South East	6,316		3,425		
Akoko South West	11,833		12,331		
Akure North	10,857		4,916		
Akure South	49,915		12,467		
Ese Odo	9,137		7,295		
Idanre	15,990		5,923		
Ifedore	11,062		3,978		
Okitipupa	11,968		21,024		
Ilaje	8,538		19,281		
Ile Oluji/Okeigbo	11,945		6,521		
Irele	9,435		9,341		
Odigbo	13,748		12,272		
Ondo East	8,404		3,933		
Ondo West	41,280		6,669		
Ose	11,071		6,058		
Owo	14,870		5,826		
Totals	260,197		155,961		
