= Sule Ahman =

Nigerian army officer

Military Administrator of Enugu State
- In office 22 August 1996 – August 1998
- Preceded by: Mike Torey
- Succeeded by: Adewunmi Agbaje

Personal details
- Spouse: Hapsatu Hamza Mohammad
- Children: 5

Military service
- Allegiance: Nigeria
- Branch/service: Nigerian Army
- Rank: Colonel

Sule M. Ahman is a retired army officer who was appointed Military Administrator of Enugu State, Nigeria from August 1996 to August 1998 during the military regime of general Sani Abacha.

During the military coup of 27 August 1985, when General Ibrahim Babangida became head of state, Major Sule Ahman lent support in his position in Supply and Transport in the Ikeja Cantonment.

As military administrator of Enugu State, Colonel Ahman inaugurated the 22nd General Assembly of Broadcasting Organizations of Nigeria, held in Enugu in 1997. In his address, Ahman urged the Chief Executives to help educate and enlighten the public, to ensure the success of the nation's transition programme. Ahman initiated a policy that only indigenes should be employed in the public service of Enugu State. Non-indigenes were summarily dismissed. He was also responsible for a major overhaul to the charter of the Enugu State Environmental Protection Agency which his predecessor Colonel Lucky Mike Torey had established in 1995, increasing its power and the scope of its duties.
