= Ita David Ikpeme =

Retired Nigerian airforce group captain

Military Governor of Ondo State
- In office 3 February 1976 – 24 July 1978
- Preceded by: David Jemibewon (Western State)
- Succeeded by: Sunday Tuoyo

Ita David Ikpeme is a retired Nigerian airforce group captain who served as the first Governor of Ondo State (February 1976 – July 1978) after it was carved out of the old Western State during the military regime of General Olusegun Obasanjo.

Ita David Ikpeme obtained a Bachelor of Science Degree in Electrical Engineering from the University of London.

During his tenure as Governor of Ondo State, he initiated road construction in Akure, the Ondo State capital.

In December 1985 he was named as a suspect in a coup plot against the military regime of General Ibrahim Babangida.

After retiring from the air force, he was active in business. In 1997, he was one of the owners of Bailey Bridges Nigeria, which was proposing to operate a pontoon ferry across the Kwale River. In 2009, he was on the board of directors of Ekondo Microfinance Bank. He was chairman of Davandy Finance & Securities Ltd, a financial service company incorporated in 1997. He was also on the finance committee of the Efik National Association, which works to improve the health, social, and economic wellbeing of the people of Calabar.

His wife, Benedicta Tinuade Ikpeme, died aged 73 in March 2009.
