= 1991 Ondo State gubernatorial election =

1991 gubernatorial election in Ondo State, Nigeria

Ondo gubernatorial election
- December 14, 1991
Nominee	Bamidele Olumilua
Party	SDP
Elected Governor
Bamidele Olumilua
SDP

The 1991 Ondo State gubernatorial election occurred on December 14, 1991. SDP candidate Bamidele Olumilua won the election.

== Conduct ==
The gubernatorial election was conducted using an open ballot system. Primaries for the two parties to select their flag bearers were conducted on October 19, 1991.

The election occurred on December 14, 1991. SDP candidate Bamidele Olumilua won the election.
