= Adewunmi Agbaje =

Nigerian politician and military administrator

Benson Adewunmi Agbaje

Military Administrator of Enugu State
- In office August 1998 – May 1999
- Preceded by: Sule Ahman
- Succeeded by: Chimaroke Nnamani

Navy Captain Benson Adewunmi Agbaje was appointed Military Administrator of Enugu State, Nigeria from August 1998 to May 1999 during the transitional regime of General Abdulsalam Abubakar, handing over to the elected civilian governor Chimaroke Nnamani when democracy returned with the Nigerian Fourth Republic. In March 1999, he apparently ordered the arrest of Emeka Mamah, the chief correspondent of the Vanguard newspapers in Enugu, an unusual move during the transition to democracy. He was forced to retire in June 1999 under a law that affected all military ministers, governors and administrators in the Babangida, Abacha and Abubakar regimes.
