= Bode George =

Nigerian politician

Chief Olabode Ibiyinka George

9th Governor of Ondo State
- In office July 1988 – September 1990
- Preceded by: Raji Alagbe Rasaki
- Succeeded by: Sunday Abiodun Olukoya

Chairman Nigerian Ports Authority
- In office 1999 – October 2003
- Succeeded by: Chief Adebayo Sarumi

Personal details
- Born: 21 November 1945 (age 80) Lagos, Lagos State, Nigeria
- Party: People's Democratic Party
- Education: University of Lagos (MBA)

Military service
- Allegiance: Nigeria
- Branch/service: Nigerian Navy
- Rank: Commodore

Olabode Ibiyinka George ("Bode George") (born 21 November 1945) is a Nigerian politician who became Military Governor of Ondo State, and later Chairman of the Nigerian Ports Authority, then national vice-chairman in the southwest zone of the People’s Democratic Party (PDP).

== Early years ==
George was born on November 21, 1945, in Lagos. He earned a B.Sc. and MBA. Bode George became a Commodore in the Nigerian navy, and was appointed Military Governor of Ondo State (1988–1990).

In a July 2002 interview, Lagos State Governor Bola Tinubu said Bode George needed to face a criminal tribunal over his activity in Ondo state. He said "Bode George and his fellow travellers who believe in military arbitrariness have to be told in clear terms that their time has passed, we are under democracy now." In response the PDP party Chairman, Alhaji Muhammed Muritala Ashorobi, said Bode George had an outstanding record as governor of old Ondo State, and the structures he built were key monuments. He established the Rufus Giwa Polytechnic, Owo by edict in 1990, a school that now has over 4,000 students.

He became Principal Staff Officer to General Oladipo Diya when the latter was Chief of General Staff, between 1993 and 1997. George was also a Director at the Nigerian National War College (NWC).

== Ports Authority chairman ==
George was appointed Chairman of the Nigerian Ports Authority in 1999. In February 2001, while visiting the Delta ports, Bode George called for increased security, and also discussed the delays in payment of large sums of money owed to the port authority by organizations such as the Petroleum Products Marketing Company, Nigerian National Shipping Line, Delta Steel Company and Central Water Transport Company. In April 2001, George said that one of the causes of port congestion was the importers being slow to clear their goods because of fear of seizure. In May 2001, Bode George called for construction of new dry ports and warehouses to tackle congestion. In September 2001, Chief Bode George directed that all empty containers should be moved out of the Lagos seaports to free up space. In July 2002, he appealed to Truck Owners striking over clearance of goods at the Lagos ports to go back to work.

In March 2003, George commended the Grimaldi Group for investing in Nigeria, and said the NPA would solve the shortage of berths for ships at the RORO port by expansion when the present government gained power in April. In August 2003, talking of plans to privatize port operations, Bode George said "The illusion that the NPA is a buoyant and bottomless source of funds, which has encouraged a culture of carefreeness in the handling of contracts and materials, the unwarranted external influences to procure materials and equipment that are not required for our operations needs, lack of proper stock taking and modern store management procedures, the poor maintenance and management of our assets, all these must give way to harsh realities of our new role."

In October 2003, the senior management and the board of the Nigerian Ports Authority were dismissed. The new managing director, Chief Adebayo Sarumi, hired auditors to review major existing contracts. The auditors found irregularities and their report was passed on to the Economic and Financial Crimes Commission under Nuhu Ribadu, which started investigations in 2005.

== PDP positions ==
George was close to president Olusegun Obasanjo, and was given preference in the sale of houses in Lagos state. In 2001, George was made the PDP's national vice-chairman in the southwest zone. Later he became PDP Deputy National Chairman, South, and then the National Deputy Chairman of the PDP.

At a March 2001 rally, George appeared to back Chief Funsho Williams, the runner-up in 1998 Lagos State governorship primaries of the Alliance for Democracy (AD) party, as the PDP candidate for the 2003 governorship election. Williams later decamped to the PDP.

In February 2002, in response to allegations that the PDP was imposing levies on prospective aspirants for political offices, Bode George said the party had never given such a directive, and anyone caught doing do would be arrested and handed over to the Police. In August 2002, Nick Mbaezue, the leader of Anambra People's Forum (APF) arm of the Anambra State chapter of People's Democratic Party (PDP) accused Bode George of auctioning the PDP executive to the governor's faction.

In January 2003, Chief Olorunfunmi Bashorun, the founding chairman of the Peoples Democratic Party in Lagos State, and other leaders, petitioned the National Chairman over a crisis in the party. They accused George and his client Alhaji Murtala Ashorobi of favoritism. In April 2004, George denied any involvement in the reported detention of Governor Bola Tinubu of Lagos State and two other former governors. The three were attending a funeral in Iyin-Ekiti when they were detained by soldiers and policemen.

In June 2004, a splinter group of the PDP accused Bode George, south-west chairman of the party, Senator Adeseye Ogunlewe, and Mohammed Ashorobi, the PDP state chairman of breaking up the party through of intimidation, blackmail, discrimination and abuse of power. In July 2004, there was a crisis in Anambra State where the house of assembly first stated that the governor Chris Ngige had resigned and the deputy governor, Okey Udeh should take his place, then reversed their decision saying they had been deliberately misled. Bode George headed a PDP panel that recommended that Okey Udeh resign.

In January 2005, This Day reported that Bode George was expected to be named National Chairman of the PDP at the party's national convention in November. In July 2005, he was promoted to PDP Deputy National Chairman (South). In February 2007, Olabode George called for the resignation of Vice President Atiku Abubakar, who had defected to the Action Congress (AC) party.

In March 2008, the PDP National Chairman, Prince Vincent Ogbulafor dismissed Bode George from the Governing Board of the Peoples Democratic Institute (PDI). In April 2008, the PDP National Disciplinary Committee (NDC), which Bode George headed, was dismantled.

== EFCC prosecutions ==
In April 2005, Olabode George threatened court action over a newspaper allegation that an N85 billion scam was uncovered in the Nigerian Ports Authority (NPA) while he was chairman of the NPA board. He described the allegation as senseless, baseless and thoughtless.

He was indicted by the Economic and Financial Crimes Commission (EFCC) when it was headed by Nuhu Ribadu on charges of fraud at the NPA. However, he was widely rumoured to have been shielded from prosecution by President Olusegun Obasanjo. The EFCC report issued on 1 April 2005 stated that NPA board members, including Chairman Bode George, and the management of the NPA should be held responsible for deliberate and flagrant violations of government rules and regulations governing the award of contracts, and should be sanctioned for contract splitting and inflation of contract price in utter disregard to laid-down government rules and regulations. President Obasanjo dismissed the findings as inconclusive, and ordered another investigation. The second EFCC report cleared Bode George.

In November 2005, the EFCC invited Bode George to a meeting to discuss a party issue where his name had come up. In March 2006, the Alliance for Democracy (AD) called on President Olusegun Obasanjo to prosecute the Deputy National Chairman of the Peoples Democratic Party (PDP), Olabode George, and the board and management of the NPA over allegations of frivolous award of contracts worth N60 million.

In August 2008, the EFCC under its new head Farida Waziri arrested Olabode George in Lagos and arraigned him and four others on a 163 count-charge of conspiracy, disobedience to lawful order, abuse of office and alleged illegal award of contracts worth N84 billion while he was chairman of the NPA. After the trial had started, the EFCC reduced the charge to 63 counts. In October 2009, Bode George was found guilty and sentenced to jail for 30 months. The sentence was handed out by Justice Joseph Olubunmi Oyewole. The judge found the defendants guilty on 47 out of the 68 counts. The total sentences added up to 28 years, but the counts for disobedience to lawful order were ruled to run concurrently for six months, and the counts for contract inflation then to run concurrently for two years.

George's lawyers filed an appeal and requested bail pending resolution of the appeal. The appeal was however refused by the court. As a prisoner, Chief Bode George and his colleagues were placed in the V.I.P. section of the prison. They were not required to wear prison uniforms, and were allowed to have meals prepared by their families. On December 13, 2013, the Supreme Court discharged the conviction of Bode George. The court, headed by judge John Afolabi Fabiyi, said the EFCC had no evidence that George intended to commit fraud at the NPA, and the charges of “contract splitting” was unknown to law.
