= Sunday Abiodun Olukoya =

Nigerian politician and navy officer (1949–2021)

Rear Admiral Sunday Abiodun Olukoya

Military Governor of Ondo State
- In office 3 September 1990 – 3 January 1992
- Preceded by: Bode George
- Succeeded by: Dele Olumilua

Personal details
- Born: 6 April 1949
- Died: 23 August 2021 (aged 72)

Military service
- Allegiance: Nigeria
- Branch/service: Nigerian Navy
- Years of service: 1967–1999
- Rank: Rear Admiral

Sunday Abiodun Olukoya (6 April 1949 – 23 August 2021) was a Nigerian navy admiral who served as Military Administrator of Ondo State from September 1990 to January 1992 during the military regime of General Ibrahim Babangida. Born on 6 April 1949, he retired as a Rear Admiral in 1999 and died on 23 August 2021. During his tenure, he named Ondo State the Sunshine State and was among past governors of Ondo State who praised the achievements of Governor Olusegun Mimiko and charged him to ensure that his administration continues to develop the state.
