= Associated Aviation Flight 361 =

2013 aviation accident

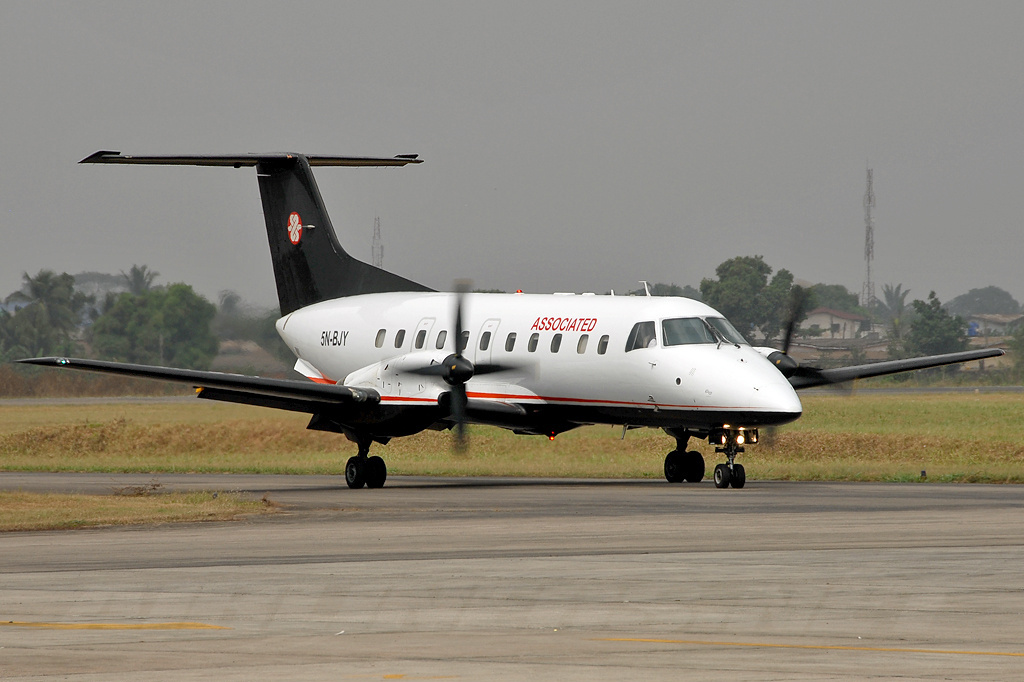
- 5N-BJY, the accident aircraft, photographed in 2008

Accident
- Date: 3 October 2013
- Summary: Crashed following engine failure on takeoff and pilot error
- Site: Murtala Mohammed Airport, Lagos, Nigeria; 6°33′48.32″N 3°19′25.10″E

Aircraft
- Aircraft type: Embraer EMB 120 Brasilia
- Operator: Associated Aviation
- ICAO flight No.: SCD361
- Call sign: ASSOCIATED 361
- Registration: 5N-BJY
- Flight origin: Murtala Mohammed Airport, Lagos, Nigeria
- Destination: Akure Airport, Ondo State, Nigeria
- Occupants: 20
- Passengers: 13
- Crew: 7
- Fatalities: 16
- Survivors: 4

Associated Aviation Flight 361 was a domestic charter flight operated by Associated Aviation that on 3 October 2013 crashed on takeoff from Lagos, Nigeria, killing 16 of the 20 people on board. The aircraft, a twin turboprop Embraer 120 Brasilia, was transporting the body of Nigerian politician Olusegun Agagu to Akure for burial.

== Accident ==
The aircraft was conveying the body of former governor of Ondo State Olusegun Agagu from Lagos to Akure for burial. It lifted off from runway 18L of Murtala Mohammed Airport at about 09:32 local time (08:32 UTC). The crew received warnings from the aircraft's aural warning system during the takeoff-roll and also failed to make "V1" and "rotate" calls; the aircraft then struggled to gain altitude immediately after takeoff. Less than a minute after lifting off, the aircraft impacted terrain in a nose-down-and-near-90-degrees-bank attitude.

Reports differ but according to the manifest the flight had 13 passengers and seven crew; four passengers and two crew survived the accident but one of passengers later died in hospital. Fatalities included relatives of Olusegun Agagu; and officials of the Ondo State Government. An elaborate burial ceremony planned for Agagu was postponed as a result of the crash.

== Aircraft ==
The aircraft used for the flight was an Embraer EMB 120 Brasilia, registered 5N-BJY, and manufactured in 1990, at the time of the crash, 5N-BJY was 23 years old. It was delivered to Associated Aviation in May 2007.

== Investigation ==
Nigeria's Accident Investigation Bureau (AIB) was responsible for the investigation. On 11 October 2013, the AIB released a preliminary report suggesting that improperly configured flaps for takeoff might have led to the crash. The report also reveals that the No. 1 engine appeared to be working normally whilst the No. 2 engine produced significantly less thrust.
