= Julius Abure =

Nigerian lawyer and politician (born 1971)

National Chairman of the Labour Party
- In office 2021 – -
- Preceded by: Abdukadir Abdulsalam
- Succeeded by: -

Personal details
- Born: 24 June 1971 (age 54)
- Party: Labour Party

Julius Abure (born 24 June 1971) is a Nigerian lawyer and politician, who served as the National Chairman of the Labour Party (LP) from 2021 till date.

Abure was previously the National Secretary of the Labour Party and also worked at the Edo State Reform Commission.

== Career ==
Abure became the chairman of the Nigerian political party, Labour Party following the death of his predecessor Abdukadir Abdulsalam. He was elected by the Labour Party National Executive Council (NEC) in 2021, as he was the National Secretary of the party at the time.

However, his chairmanship was challenged by some party members, especially Lamidi Apapa, the suspended deputy national chairman, who claimed to have removed Abure through a court order.

The Court of Appeal, sitting in Benin City, Edo State, affirmed Julius Abure as the national chairman of the Labour Party, dismissing the appeal filed by Lucky Shaibu, a party member who supported Apapa.

Abure has received the backing of the Nigerian Labour Congress (NLC) and the presidential candidate of the Labour Party (LP), Peter Obi, who both recognized him as the legitimate leader of the party. The Supreme Court Abuja, recognised Mr. Julius Abure as the National Chairman of the Labour Party, LP.

== Controversy ==
On 21 February 2024, he was illegally arrested by the Edo State Police Command on allegations of attempted murder, among other alleged infractions. The arrest followed a petition by the former LP Youth Leader Comrade Eragbe Anselm Aphimia, who claimed that Abure orchestrated a violent attack on him and his colleague in December 2023. He was released on 22 February 2024.

He also faced allegations of embezzlement of N3 billion belonging to the party, which was laid by the suspended National Treasurer of the party, Oluchi Opara.

Julius was also accused of trying to disrupt the party's gubernatorial primaries in Edo State, which was scheduled to hold on Friday, 23 February 2024. Amongst all, He has been commended by some party members for his democratic style of leadership and transparency in the party's affairs.
