= 1991 Enugu State gubernatorial election =

1991 gubernatorial election in Enugu State, Nigeria

Enugu gubernatorial election
- December 14, 1991
Nominee	Okwesilieze Nwodo
Party	NRC
Elected Governor
Okwesilieze Nwodo
NRC

The 1991 Enugu State gubernatorial election occurred on December 14, 1991. NRC candidate Okwesilieze Nwodo won the election.

== Conduct ==
The gubernatorial election was conducted using an open ballot system. Primaries for the two parties to select their flag bearers were conducted on October 19, 1991.

The election occurred on December 14, 1991. NRC candidate Okwesilieze Nwodo won the election.
