= Ahmed Usman =

Nigerian Army officer and politician (1951–2021)

Military Governor of Oyo State
- In office 22 August 1996 – August 1998
- Preceded by: Chinyere Ike Nwosu
- Succeeded by: Amen Edore Oyakhire

Military Governor of Ondo State
- In office September 1994 – August 1996
- Preceded by: Mike Torey
- Succeeded by: Anthony Onyearugbulem

Personal details
- Born: 20 August 1951
- Died: 14 April 2021 (aged 69) Jos, Nigeria

Military service
- Allegiance: Nigeria
- Branch: Nigerian Army
- Rank: Colonel

Colonel Ahmed Usman (20 August 1951 – 14 April 2021) was a Nigerian military administrator of Ondo State and later Oyo State during the military regime of General Sani Abacha.

== Early career ==
Ahmed Usman was born in 1951 and grew up in Okura-Lafia, Dekina Local Government Area, Kogi State. After joining the army, postings included Second in Command, 192 Battalion, Abak and 141 Battalion, Kano (1983–1985), United Nations Interim Force in Lebanon (1985–1986) and Battalion Commander G Amphibious, Elele Port Hartcourt (1990–1991).

Usman was appointed governor of Ondo State in September 1994. While governor of Ondo State, Usman installed Oba Adeleye Orisagbemi as the Attah of Ayede Ekiti. Amid concerns about cultism in the state, on 17 June 1996, Usman threatened to dismiss any Ondo State judge who granted bail to secret cult suspects. In 1998, Adeoluwa Oyerinde, a former Managing Director of a subsidiary of the Odu'a Investment Company, alleged that he had given bribes to Usman and other military governors while Usman was administrator of Ondo State.

== Oyo State Governor ==
In August 1996, Usman was deployed to Oyo State to be governor at a time of growing discontent about the military regime headed by Sani Abacha. On 12 May 1997, a bomb explosion in the state capital of Ibadan injured two soldiers and a policeman. Usman said the perpetrators were cowards. Two people were killed and about 20 wounded at the Salami Sports Stadium, Ibadan, in April 1998, when supporters of the United Action for Democracy (UAD) disrupted a pro-Abacha rally that had earlier been addressed by Colonel Usman.

Seven people were killed in 1998 May Day clashes between police and pro-democracy protesters. Usman blamed "foreign enemies" of supporting the violence. Later that month, Usman said security forces had been placed on red alert to stop any protest in the state capital, Ibadan. A few days later, thirty-seven Nigerians were arrested and charged with subversion, including educator and Oyo State National Democratic Coalition leader Lam Adesina, who later became Governor of the state in 1999. Usman said they would be treated as "prisoners of war". Three other people, one a prominent newspaper editor, were charged with subversion. Sani Abacha died in June 1998, and Usman was relieved of his position as governor in August 1998.

== Later life ==
After the return to democracy in 1999, Usman entered private business and stayed out of politics until in August 2008, when he declared that he intended to run for governor of Kogi State in 2011. Running under the platform of the Peoples Democratic Party, he lost in the party primary election. He later expressed interest in running in the 2019 Kogi State gubernatorial election as well, as part of the All Progressives Congress, but ultimately did not enter the race.

Usman died on 14 April 2021 at the age of 69 in Jos, Plateau State, following an illness. His body was brought back to his hometown of Okura-Lafia, Kogi State, for an Islamic funeral. Kogi State Governor Yahaya Bello offered condolences following Usman's death.
