= Michael Bamidele Otiko =

Nigerian politician

Governor of Ondo State
- In office January 1984 – 2 September 1985
- Preceded by: Michael Adekunle Ajasin
- Succeeded by: Michael Okhai Akhigbe

Personal details
- Born: 18 April 1934 Akure, Ondo, Nigeria
- Died: 25 December 1999 (aged 65)

Commodore Michael Bamidele Otiko (18 April 1934 – 25 December 1999) was the first director of naval education in Nigeria, and later was appointed Governor of Ondo State, Nigeria.

Otiko was director of naval education from January 1975 to December 1979 as a commander, from January 1980 to January 1981 and from December 1981 to December 1983 as a captain, and from February 1983 to January 1984 as a commodore. Otiko was appointed Governor of Ondo State from January 1984 to September 1985 during the military regime of general Mohammadu Buhari. During his term of office, Otiko renamed the State University from Obafemi Awolowo University to Ondo State University, since Buhari did not want to honor the Nigerian First Republic Western Region Premier Obafemi Awolowo. He was blamed for the detention of former deputy governor of Ondo State, Akin Omoboriowo, for 16 months. He arranged for completion of construction on Akure airport.
