= Mike Torey =

Nigerian governor

Lucky Mike Torey

Military Governor of Ondo State
- In office December 1993 – September 1994
- Preceded by: Dele Olumilua
- Succeeded by: Ahmed Usman

Military Administrator of Enugu State
- In office 14 September 1994 – 22 August 1996
- Preceded by: Temi Ejoor
- Succeeded by: Sule Ahman

Personal details
- Died: 16 November 2013

Military service
- Allegiance: Nigeria
- Branch/service: Nigerian Army
- Rank: Colonel

Lucky Mike Torey was a Nigerian army officer who was appointed Military Administrator of Ondo State, Nigeria from December 1993 to September 1994, and then of Enugu State until August 1996 during the military regime of general Sani Abacha. He died on 16 November 2013, after a brief illness.

Colonel Lucky Mike Torey established the Enugu State Environmental Protection Agency in 1995. In 1996, Torey stopped state government subventions to some of the Enugu State parastatals, including the Enugu State water corporation.

In 2005, Torey was one of the aspirants to the Unuevworo traditional stool in Ekpan, Uvwie Local Government area of Delta State. In March 2010, Torey chaired a ceremony where the Federal Government presented a Site Handing Over Certificate to H.O.B. Nigeria for a 430-unit housing project in Akure, Ondo State.
