= Rufus Giwa Polytechnic =

Tertiary learning institution in Owo, Ondo State, Nigeria

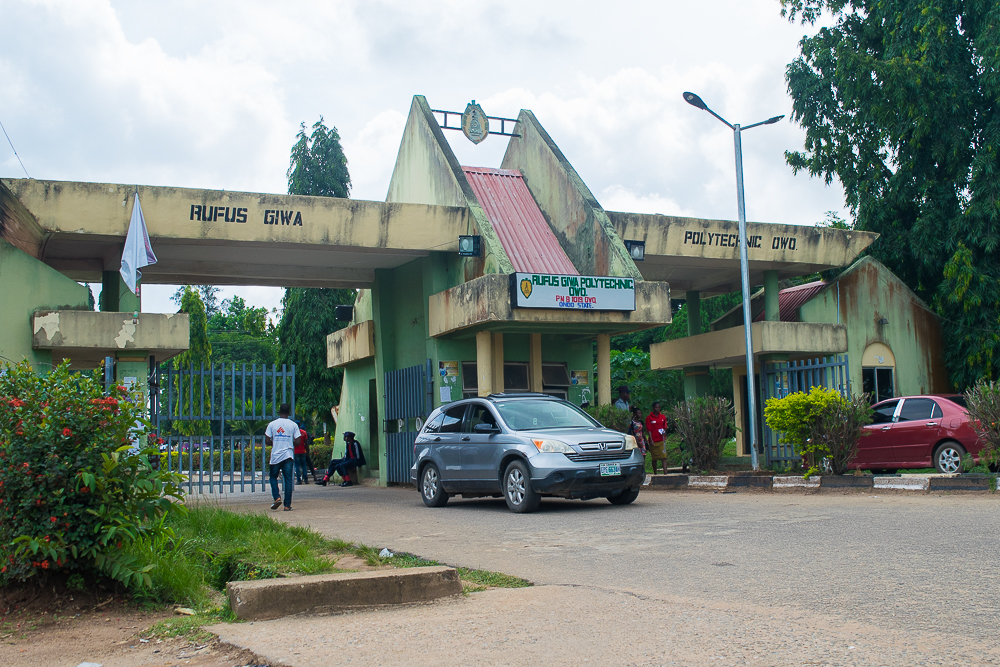
- Type: Public
- Established: 1979
- Accreditation: Institute of Chartered Accountants of Nigeria
- Rector: Olorunwa Adegun
- Location: Owo, Ondo State, 341104, Nigeria
- Website: Official website

Rufus Giwa Polytechnic is a tertiary learning institution in Owo, Ondo State, Nigeria. The National Board for Technical Education has approved it as a state-owned Polytechnic. It is also accredited by the Institute of Chartered Accountants of Nigeria.

The Polytechnic was established by edict in 1979 with the name The Polytechnic, Owo by the outgone Military Governor Sunday Tuoyo., While it began its activities in January 1980. The Executive Governor Adekunle Ajasin began to operate the Polytechnic immediately he assumed office in early 1980. It was renamed Ondo State Polytechnic in 1990. By 2010, the polytechnic had over 4,000 students.

The Polytechnic has several department in the Faculties of Engineering, Science and Technology, LEMS, etc.The Ondo State Government's primary mandate for the Institution is to provide middle-level manpower in science and technology fields. This initiative aims to enhance technological development in Ondo State and Nigeria as a whole. It has a mandate of training and developing techniques in Applied Science, Engineering, Environmental Studies, Accounting, Commerce and Home Economics.

== Rectors ==
Rufus Giwa Polytechnic had the following rectors: Mr Olusegun Arodudu, Dr Adeyeri, Prof Adedimila, Mr Alao, Mr Ogundowole, Prof Peter Fapetu, prof ajibefun, Engr Ologunagba Mr Gani Ogundahunsi and Mr Olorunwa Adegun. .The present Rector of the polytechnics is Dr. Sunday

== Rename of the institution ==
In June 2003, the Polytechnic was renamed after Chief Rufus Folusho Giwa, a prominent businessman from Ondo who had become president of the Manufacturers Association of Nigeria (MAN). Students protested the change of name and the school was shut down, only reopening on 29 September 2003. In July 2009, the polytechnic closed down due to a strike by the staff over non-payment of 10 months monetization arrears. In February 2010, Ondo State Governor Olusegun Mimiko inaugurated a 16-person governing council for the polytechnic. In March 2010, Mimiko said that his government had paid the monetisation arrears of N210 million owed to the polytechnic.

== Courses offered ==
- Accountancy
- Agriculture Engineering And Technology
- Agricultural Technology
- Animal Health And Production Technology
- Agricultural And Bio- Environmental Engineering Technology
- Architectural Technology
- Arts And Design
- Banking And Finance
- Building Technology
- Business Administration and Management
- Civil Engineering Technology
- Cooperative Economics and Management
- Computer Engineering
- Computer Science
- Electrical/ Electronic Engineering Technology
- Estate Management And Valuation
- Fisheries Technology
- Food Technology
- Forestry Technology
- Horticultural Technology
- Hospitality Management
- Insurance
- Library And Information Science
- Leisure and Tourism Management
- Marketing
- Mass Communication
- Mechanical Engineering Technology
- Mechatronics
- MICROFINANCE and Enterprise Development
- Nutrition And Dietetics
- Office Technology And Management
- Pharmaceutical Technology
- Public Administration
- Quality Surveying
- Science Laboratory Technology
- Social Development
- Statistics
- Surveying And Geo-Informatics
- Urban And Regional Planning
- Taxation
- Welding and Fabrication Engineering Technology

== Admission requirements ==
Seeking admission into Rufus Giwa polytechnics Ondo state, Aspirant must have 5 credit pass in west Africa examination council(WAEC), or National Examination council (NECO), Or NABTEB, Including English and mathematics. And also must have the Equivalent cut off mark, for Joint Admission matriculation Board exam(JAMB) for the year.

== Library ==
The Library began its operation in 1980 with opening stock of 2800 volumes of information materials. It was established to provide academic support to the institution. The library had made provision for relevant information materials and equipment towards the achievement of its major goals so that the advancement of quality education and technological advancement.

== Project commission ==
On 2 October 2020 the former governor of Ondo state Rotimi Akeredolu commissioned a Radio station that was built by the school. A new bursar building was also commissioned alongside the radio station in the school.

== Gallery ==
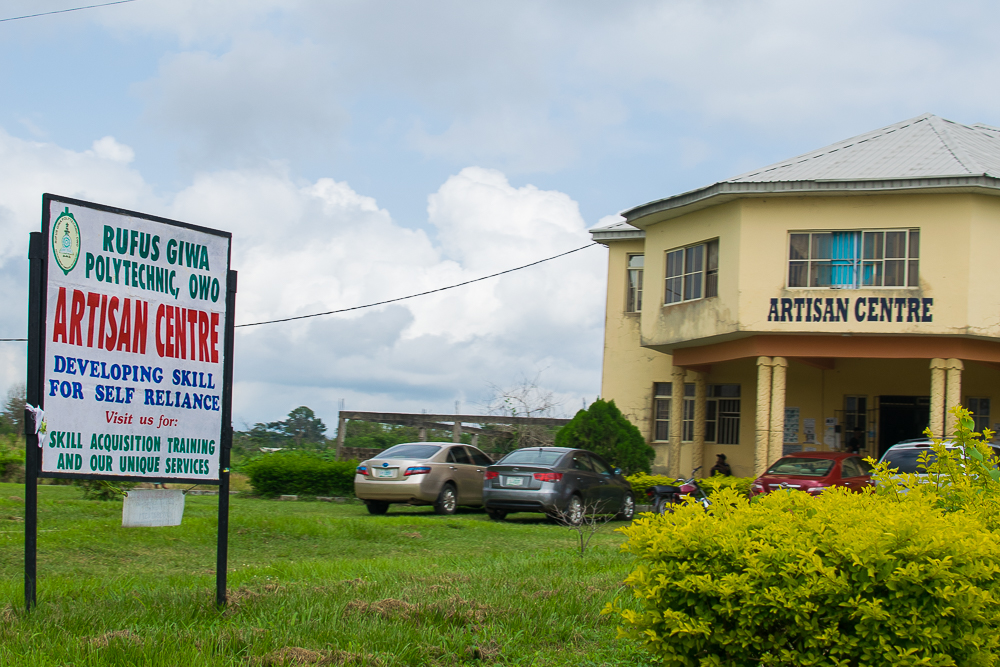
Artisan center, Rufus Giwa Polytechnic, Owo

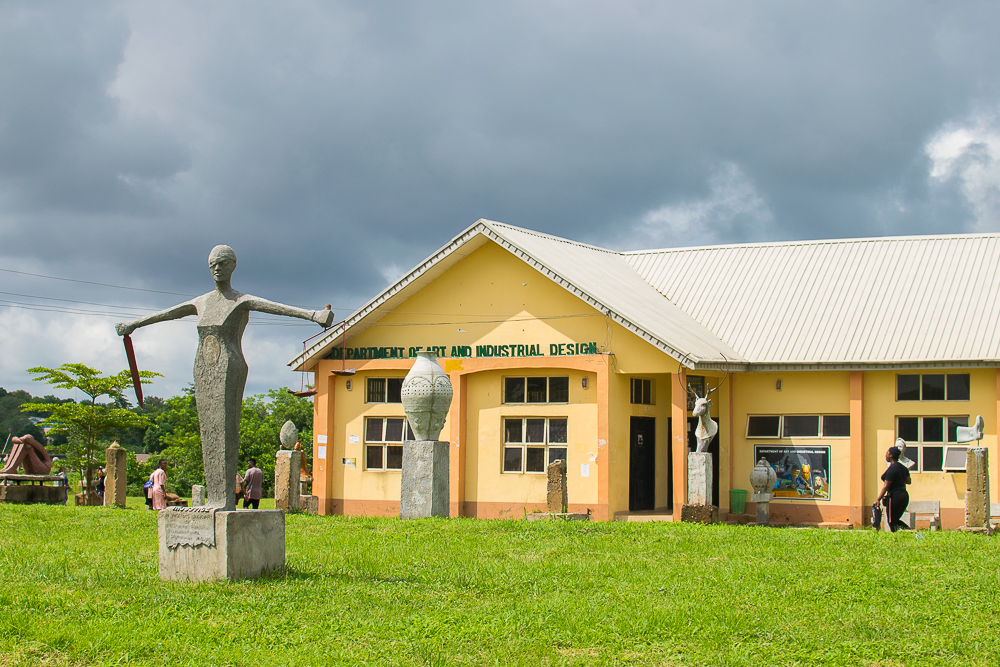
Department of Art and Industrial Design, Rufus Giwa Polytechnic, Owo, Ondo state

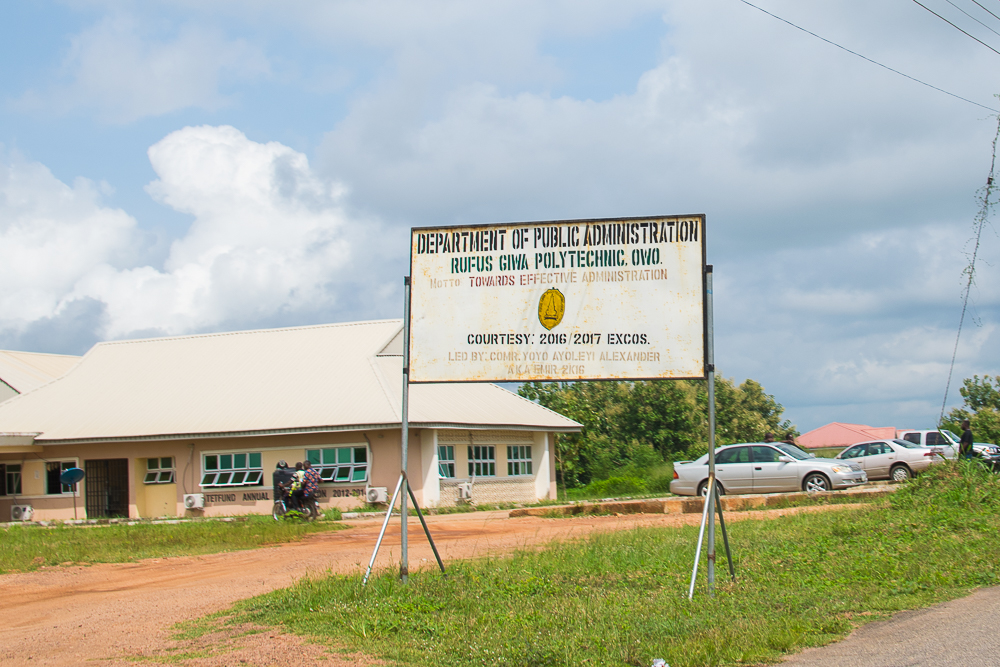
Department of Public Administration, Rufus Giwa Polytechnic, Owo

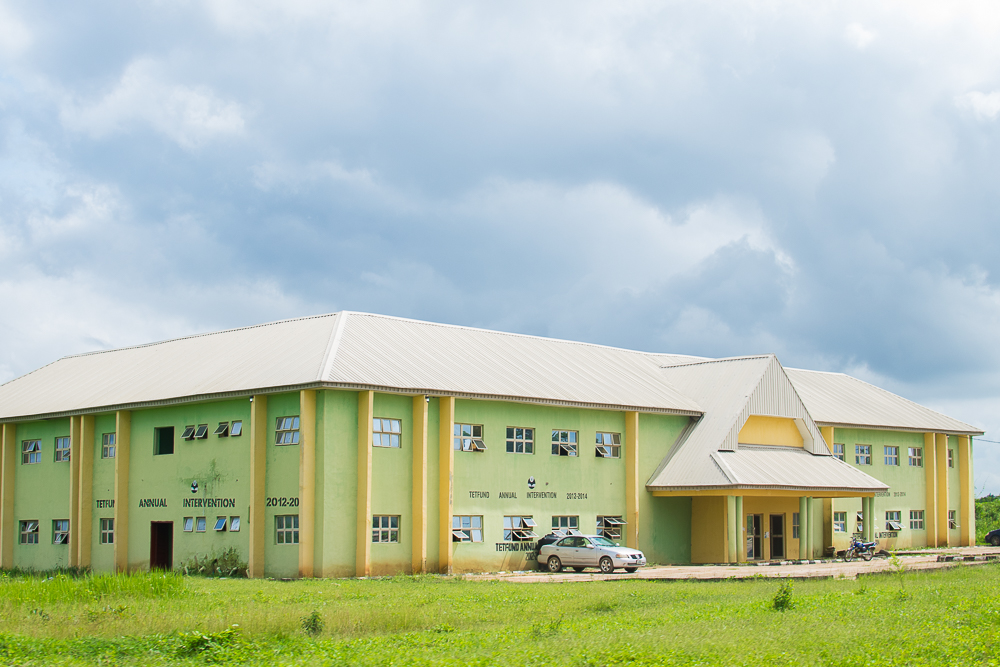
TETfund building, Rufus Giwa Polytechnic, Owo

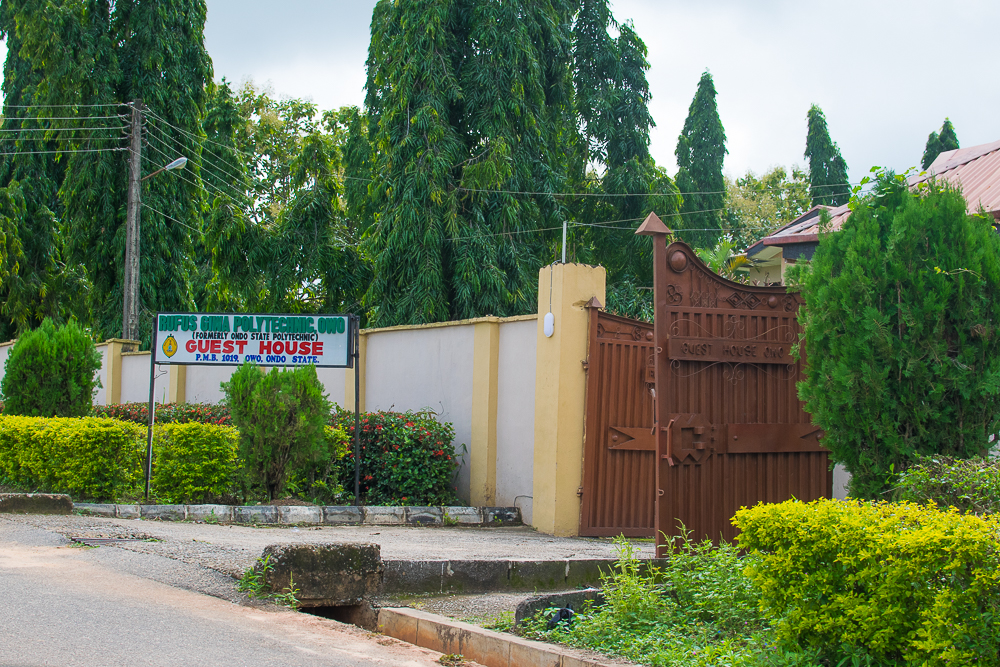
Rufus Giwa Polytechnic Guesthouse, Owo

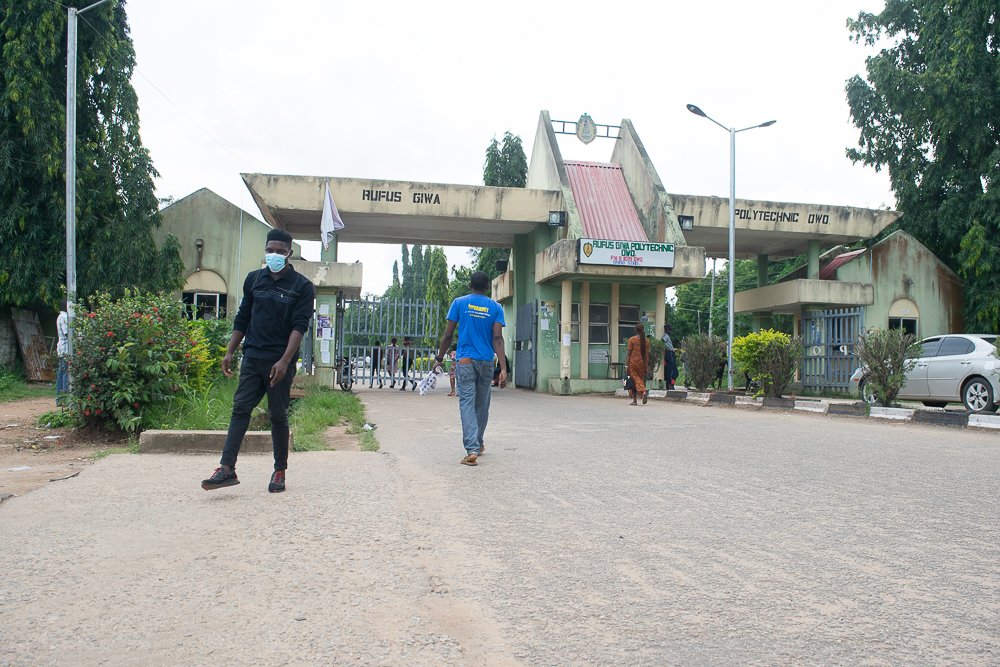
Rufus Giwa Polytechnic gate, Owo

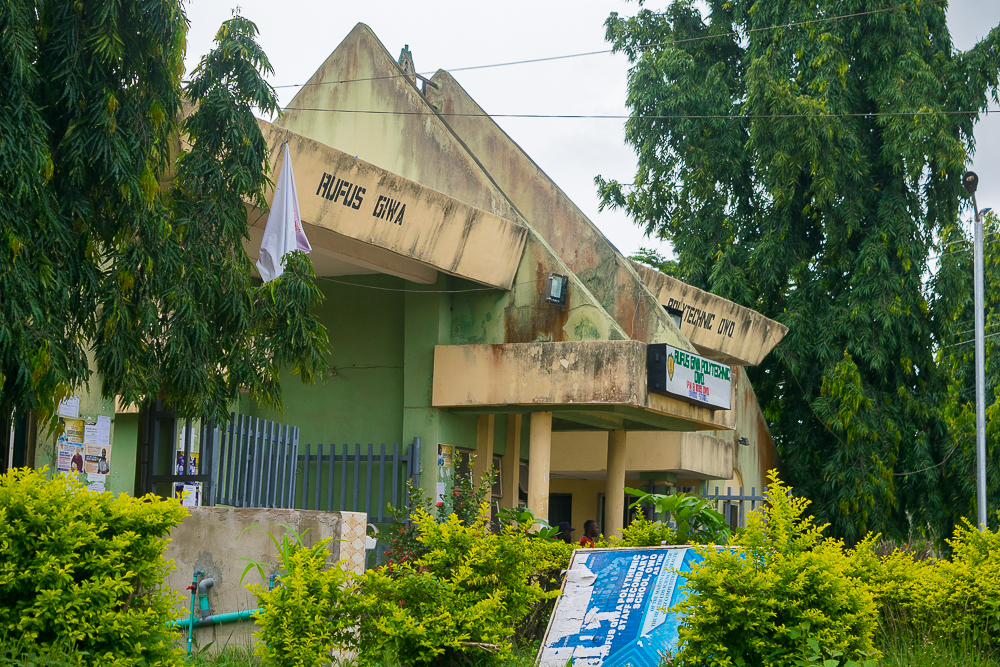
Another view of Rufus Giwa Polytechnic gate, Owo

== See also ==
- Achievers University
- Federal Medical Centre
- List of polytechnics in Nigeria
