= Ondo State Government House =

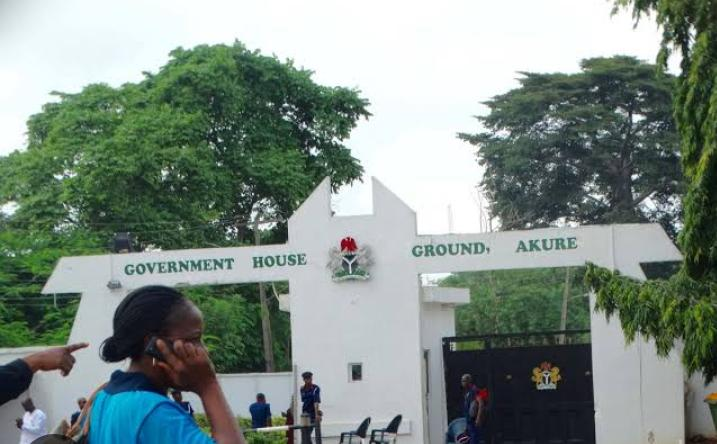
Government House

The Ondo State Government House is the official quarters of the executive members of the Ondo State Government. The government house is located in Alagbaka, a town in Akure, the capital of Ondo State southwestern Nigeria.
