= 2007 Ondo State gubernatorial election =

State election in Nigeria

- 14 April 2007
Nominee	Olusegun Agagu	Olusegun Mimiko
Party	PDP	LP
Popular vote	349,258	226,051
Governor before election
Olusegun Agagu
PDP
Elected Governor
Olusegun Agagu
PDP

The 2007 Ondo State gubernatorial election was the 6th gubernatorial election in Ondo State, Nigeria. Held on 14 April 2007, the People's Democratic Party nominee Olusegun Agagu won the election, defeating Olusegun Mimiko of the Labour Party.

== Results ==
Olusegun Agagu from the People's Democratic Party won the election, defeating Olusegun Mimiko from the Labour Party. Registered voters was 1,356,779.

2007 Ondo State gubernatorial election
Party	Candidate	Votes	%	±%
PDP	Olusegun Agagu	349,258		
LP	Olusegun Mimiko	226,051		
PDP hold				
