= 1999 Ondo State gubernatorial election =

1999 gubernatorial election in Ondo State, Nigeria

- 9 January 1999
Nominee	Adebayo Adefarati
Party	AD	PDP
Popular vote	328,053	195,682
Governor before election
Moses Fasanya
Elected Governor
Adebayo Adefarati
AD

The 1999 Ondo State gubernatorial election occurred in Nigeria on 9 January 1999. The AD nominee Adebayo Adefarati won the election, defeating the PDP candidate.

Adebayo Adefarati emerged as an AD candidate.

== Electoral system ==
The Governor of Ondo State is elected using the plurality voting system.

== Primary election ==
=== AD primary ===
The AD primary election was won by Adebayo Adefarati.

== Results ==
The total number of registered voters in the state was 1,333,617. Total number of votes cast was 557,148, while number of valid votes was 544,299. Rejected votes were 12,849.

Candidate	Party	Votes	%
Adebayo Adefarati	Alliance for Democracy	328,053	62.64
-	People's Democratic Party	195,682	37.36
Total		523,735	100.00
Valid votes		523,735	97.61
Invalid/blank votes		12,849	2.39
Total votes		536,584	100.00
Registered voters/turnout		1,333,617	40.24
Source: Nigeria World, IFES, Semantics Scholar
