= Sunday Tuoyo =

Nigerian military governor (1938–2022)

Military Governor of Ondo State
- In office 24 July 1978 – 1 October 1979
- Preceded by: Ita David Ikpeme
- Succeeded by: Michael Adekunle Ajasin

Personal details
- Born: 24 February 1935
- Died: 17 December 2022 (aged 87)

Military service
- Allegiance: Nigeria
- Branch/service: Nigerian Army
- Years of service: 1961–1984
- Rank: Brigadier general

Sunday Esijolomi Tuoyo (24 February 1935 – 17 December 2022) was a Nigerian Brigadier General who served as the Military Governor of Ondo State (July 1978 – October 1979) during the military regime of General Olusegun Obasanjo.

== Education ==
Tuoyo attended Hussey College Warri.

== Personal life ==
Tuoyo was of Itsekiri origin.

His son-in-law was Emmanuel Uduaghan, elected governor of Delta State in April 2007.

He died on 17 December 2022, at the age of 87.
