= Adebayo Adefarati =

Nigerian politician (1931–2007)

Chief Adebayo Adefarati

Governor of Ondo State
- In office 29 May 1999 – 29 May 2003
- Deputy: Afolabi Iyantan
- Preceded by: Moses Fasanya
- Succeeded by: Olusegun Agagu

Ondo State Commissioner for Works and Transport
- In office 1979–1983
- Governor: Michael Adekunle Ajasin

Personal details
- Born: 14 February 1931 Akungba Akoko, Southern Region, British Nigeria (now in Ondo State, Nigeria)
- Died: 29 March 2007 (aged 76)
- Occupation: Politician

Adebayo Adefarati (14 February 1931 – 29 March 2007) was a Nigerian politician who served as governor of Ondo State from 1999 to 2003.

== Life and career ==
Adefarati was appointed commissioner twice under the Afenifere leader Chief Michael Adekunle Ajasin. He was the State Commissioner for Works and Transport (between 1979 and 1983). Adefarati was also a prominent member of the National Democratic Coalition (NADECO), a leading organization in the fight against the military during the rule of Sani Abacha.

Political intrigues during his term as governor culminated in the alienation of many of his erstwhile comrades, figures like Olusegun Mimiko, Chief Rufus Giwa, Akerele Adu, Olu Agunloye, Chief Yele Omogunwa, Chief Niyi Omodara, Olatunji Ariyo and Chief Bamidele Awosika.

This state of affairs worked against him when he bid for a second term as governor and enhanced the likelihood of victory for Olusegun Agagu at the polls in April, 2003. Claims made against Adefarati included disillusionment with his administration and a lack of transparency in the selection process adopted by the Alliance for Democracy in the selection of its gubernatorial candidates at that election.

Adefarati's relationship with Chief Ruben Fasoranti and Chief Olu Falae was only being repaired during the election, which limited the impact of the duo in his favour during the Nigerian general elections of 2003. Many of his detractors were to regret their actions later when Olusegun Agagu was himself removed from office by a coalition that included many of the previous players and was replaced by Olusegun Mimiko, thus vindicating Adefarati.

During the 1999 Ondo State gubernatorial election, Adefarati was elected governor from 1999 to 2003. He was later a presidential candidate for the Alliance for Democracy party in the April 2007 presidential election, but died in Owo, Ondo State, at the age of 76 of an undisclosed ailment a few weeks prior to the election. He had not been considered a major candidate, but his death raised the possibility that the election would be delayed. A spokesman for the Independent National Electoral Commission said that this would not happen, and that the party could name a replacement candidate.

== Personal life ==
Adefarati was a native of Akungba Akoko and was married to Adetutu Adefarati. As an Oloye of the Yoruba people, he held the traditional titles of the Otunba Elekole of Ikole and the Bobajiro of Osu-Ilesa.
