= Michael Adekunle Ajasin =

Nigerian politician (1908–1997)

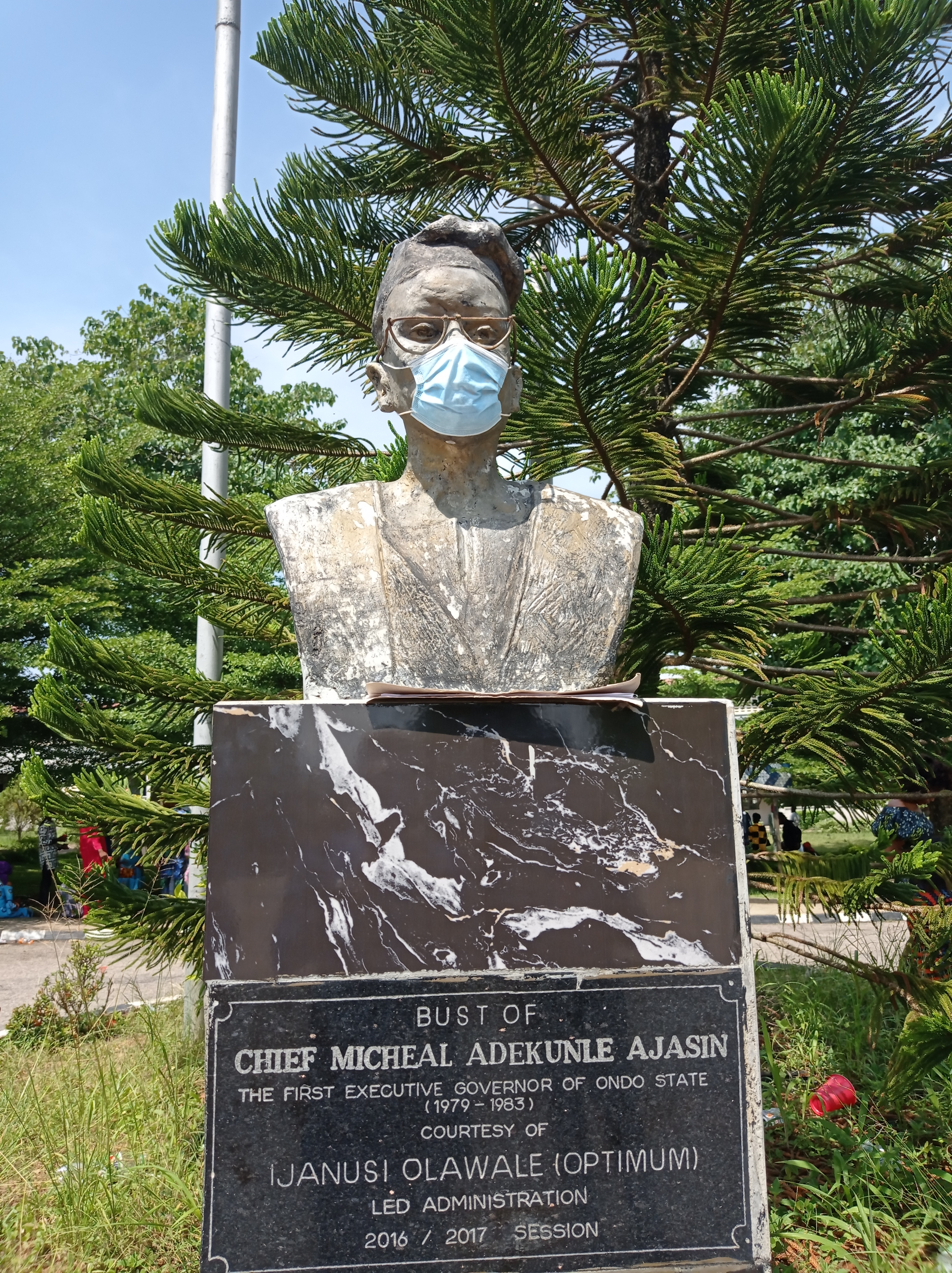
- Bust of Ajasin at Adekunle Ajasin University

Governor of Ondo State
- In office 1 October 1979 – 31 December 1983
- Deputy: Akin Omoboriowo
- Preceded by: Sunday Tuoyo
- Succeeded by: Michael Bamidele Otiko

Personal details
- Born: 28 November 1908 Owo, Southern Nigeria Protectorate (now in Ondo State, Nigeria)
- Died: 3 October 1997 (aged 88)
- Citizenship: Nigeria
- Party: Unity Party of Nigeria
- Occupation: Politician

Michael Adekunle Ajasin (28 November 1908 – 3 October 1997) was a Nigerian politician who served as governor of Ondo State from 1979 to 1983 on the Unity Party of Nigeria (UPN) platform during the Nigerian Second Republic.

== Background ==
Michael Adekunle Ajasin was born in Owo, Ondo State, south western Nigeria. on 28 November 1908. He attended St. Andrews College, Oyo between (1924–1927). He worked as a teacher for some time, then was admitted to Fourah Bay College, Sierra Leone in 1943, obtaining a Bachelor of Arts degree in English, Modern History and Economics in June, 1946. Following that, he went to the Institute of Education of the University of London where he obtained a Post Graduate Diploma in Education in June, 1947.

On 12 September 1947, Ajasin was appointed Principal of Imade College, Owo, where he initiated an aggressive staff development program, including sending teachers to University College, Ibadan for further training. In 1951 he wrote a paper that was to become the educational policy of the Action Group party, advocating free education at all levels. He was one of the founders of the party, whose other policies included immediate independence from Britain, universal health care, and abolition of want through effective economic policies. In December 1962, he left Imade College to become founder, proprietor and first principal of Owo High School from January 1963 to August, 1975, when he retired.

== Married life ==
He married Babafunke Tenabe, a teacher, on 12 January 1939. They had four children, two boys and two girls. One daughter, Mrs Olajumoke Anifowoshe, became attorney–general and commissioner for Justice in Ondo State.

== Political career ==
Ajasin was involved in Nigeria's pre-independence politics. In the 1950s, he was a national vice president of the Action Group, became an elected ward councillor and then chairman of Owo district council which was made up of Owo, Idashen, Emure Ile, Ipele, Arimogija, Ute, Elerenla, Okeluse and a few more villages. He was also elected to the Federal House of Representatives in Lagos. He was a federal legislator from 1954 to 1966 before the military took over government. In 1976, he was chairman of Owo local government and joined the Unity Party of Nigeria when the military government started a new democratic dispensation. Ajasin was elected governor of Ondo State in 1979, with Akin Omoboriowo as his running mate. Omoboriowo later fell out with him, and switched to the National Party of Nigeria (NPN), where he competed against Ajasin in the 1983 elections and was initially declared winner. Later the result was annulled and Ajasin was sworn in for a second term. Ajasin held office until the military coup of 31 December 1983 that brought General Muhammadu Buhari to power.

As governor, Ajasin signed the law establishing the Ondo State University in 1982 in Ado-Ekiti, which is in present-day Ekiti State of Nigeria. He said that

I came into office in October 1979 with a set of my own rich native dresses and left office in December 1983 with same set of dresses; no addition and no subtraction. I had two personal cars at the time I assumed office but left without any: one had ended its serviceable lifespan with its use for the shadow elections in 1982, while the other was borrowed by a political associate with whom it ended up its lifespan

— Michael Adekunle Ajasin, Vanguardngr, Ajasin was honourable and incorruptible

In 2000, during the government of Chief Adebayo Adefarati, a new university was created in Akungba Akoko and later named Adekunle Ajasin University in his honour. He also opened The Polytechnic, Owo.

=== NADECO ===
Ajasin was a leader of the National Democratic Coalition popularly known as NADECO in Nigeria. The coalition was formed to bring an end to the military government of Sani Abacha and the regime to honour the electoral mandate given to MKO Abiola. In 1995, he was arrested by the military government of Abacha along with 39 other activists for holding an illegal political meeting.
