= Supare Akoko =

Coordinates: 7°05′19.4″N 4°50′19.55″E

A short historical expose of Supare in Supare dialect by a native speaker

Supare-Akoko is a town in Akoko South West Local Government Area, Ondo State, in southwestern Nigeria. Supare is about 100 km from Akure, the state capital. It has predominantly rainforest with heavy presence of high undulating rocky and mountainous formations. The primary occupation is artisanal and commercial agriculture. CRUSH Rock Industries (Nigeria) Limited has facilities there.
