= Bamidele Olumilua =

Nigerian politician (1940–2020)

Governor of Ondo State
- In office 3 January 1992 – 17 November 1993
- Deputy: Olusegun Agagu
- Preceded by: Sunday Abiodun Olukoya
- Succeeded by: Mike Torey

Personal details
- Born: 1940
- Died: 4 June 2020 (aged 80) Ikere-Ekiti, Nigeria

Bamidele Isola Olumilua (1940 – 4 June 2020) was a Nigerian politician who was the elected governor of Ondo State, Nigeria from January 1992 to November 1993 during the Nigerian Third Republic, elected on the Social Democratic Party (SDP) platform. He was forced to leave office when the military regime of general Sani Abacha took power. He served as a Nigerian diplomat to the state of Canada. His deputy governor was Olusegun Agagu, who later became Governor of Ondo State from 29 May 2003 until February 2009. He was the Chancellor, Ekiti State University.

Olumilua joined the Peoples Democratic Party (PDP) in 1998. He was appointed the Chairman of the Christian Pilgrims Board. In August 2005, the PDP stated that he was no longer a member of the party. He later became one of the founding members of the Action Congress (AC) party, formed in 2006.

He died on 4 June 2020, aged 80.
