= Olusegun Agagu =

Nigerian politician (1948–2013)

Governor of Ondo State
- In office 29 May 2003 – 23 February 2009
- Deputy: Omolade Oluwateru
- Preceded by: Adebayo Adefarati
- Succeeded by: Olusegun Mimiko

Federal Minister of Power and Steel
- In office 2000–2002
- President: Olusegun Obasanjo

Federal Minister of Aviation
- In office 29 May 1999 – 2000
- President: Olusegun Obasanjo
- Succeeded by: Kema Chikwe

Deputy Governor of Ondo State
- In office 3 January 1992 – 17 November 1993
- Governor: Bamidele Olumilua

Personal details
- Born: Olusegun Kokumo Agagu; 16 February 1948 Okitipupa, Southern Region, British Nigeria (now in Ondo State, Nigeria)
- Died: 13 September 2013 (aged 65) Lagos, Nigeria
- Party: Peoples Democratic Party (1998–2013)
- Other political affiliations: Social Democratic Party (1992–1993)
- Spouse: Olufunke Agagu
- Education: St. Luke's Anglican School, Okitipupa; Ebenezer African Church School, Ibadan
- Occupation: Politician

Olusegun Kokumo Agagu (Born on 16 February 1948 – 13 September 2013) was a Nigerian politician who was a governor of Ondo State from 29 May 2003 until February 2009, when a court voided his re-election as governor on account of electoral irregularities. He was replaced as a governor by Olusegun Mimiko, the runner-up in the election. He was a member of the then-ruling Peoples Democratic Party (PDP).

== Educational background ==
Agagu commenced his elementary education at St. Luke's Anglican School, (now known as St. Paul's Anglican School) Okitipupa, in 1954. In January 1958, he moved to live with his cousin, Edward Fagbohun, in Ibadan, where he continued his primary education at Ebenezer African Church School, Oke-Ado, Ibadan. In 1959, he relocated to Kano where he studied at the Ebenezer Methodist School and the Baptist Primary School Sabon-Gari, Kano.

He then moved back to Ebenezer African Church School, Ibadan, where he completed his primary education in 1960. Thereafter, he was in Ibadan Grammar School between January 1961 and 1967 where he passed his West African School Certificate and the Higher School Certificate examinations. Agagu was admitted to the University of Ibadan in 1968 to study Botany but later changed to Geology in which he graduated with a B.Sc. (Hons) degree in Second Class Upper Division, in 1971.

Agagu went to the University of Texas between 1973 and 1974 for his master's degree in Geology. Returning to Nigeria, he obtained a Ph.D. in Petroleum Geology from the University of Ibadan. This was in 1978.

== Career ==
He was elected as a Deputy Governor of Ondo State, Nigeria from January 1992 to November 1993 during the Nigerian Third Republic, on the Social Democratic Party (SDP) platform. As the Deputy Governor in Ondo State, the combination of his knowledge as a Geologist, resourcefulness and his untiring efforts led to the State becoming an oil-producing state, a feat that massively expanded the economic base of the State. He was forced to leave office when the military regime of general Sani Abacha took power.

Agagu was appointed by President Olusegun Obasanjo as his first Federal Minister of Aviation in May 1999 and then as Minister for Power and Steel 2000 and 2002.

Once, while on a foreign trip, the people of Ondo received false reports of his death.

On 29 June 2006 President Olusegun Obasanjo commended him for the work he had done leading Ondo State, saying "You have taken time to plan. We have also seen that the execution of the plan is now showing results."

In September 2008 a Senate Ad-Hoc Committee investigating the Transportation Sector summoned Agagu and others as part of its probe of the entire transportation sector, to answer questions about his tenure as Minister of Aviation.

== Death ==
Agagu died during a meeting at his residence on 13 September 2013 in Lagos State.

On 3 October 2013, a day before his burial, Associated Aviation Flight 361, carrying his corpse together with 13 passengers and 7 crew members, crashed on takeoff from Murtala Muhammed International Airport.
