= Labour Party (Nigeria) =

- Abbreviation: LP
- Chairman: Sen. Nenadi E. Usman
- General Secretary: Hon. Iheanacho Obioma
- Founded: 2002; 24 years ago
- Headquarters: No. 2 IBM Haruna Street, Utako, Abuja FCT. (Near ABC Transport & NUJ Office), Abuja
- Ideology: Social democracy; Populism
- Political position: Centre-left
- Colors: Red Green
- Slogan: Forward Ever
- House of Representatives: 22 / 360
- Senate: 0 / 109
- Governorships: 1 / 36
- Seats in State Houses of Assembly: 39 / 991

Website
- labourparty.com.ng

The Labour Party (LP) is a social democratic political party in Nigeria. The party was created in 2002 and was previously known as the Party for Social Democracy (PSD) before changing to its current name the following year. Built on the ideology of social democracy, the party aims to promote and defend social democratic principles and ideals for the purpose of achieving social justice, progress and unity.

On 27 May 2022, former Anambra State governor Peter Obi joined the party after leaving the Peoples Democratic Party to contest for 2023 Nigerian presidential election.

== History ==
The party was formed in 2002 as the Party for Social Democracy, and was established by the Nigeria Labour Congress. Its name was officially changed to the Labour Party after the 2003 general election.

In 2007, Olusegun Mimiko, ran successfully as governor of Ondo State under the banner of the Labour Party for a period of two terms (2009–2017), only to return to the PDP in 2020.

=== 2021 ===
After the late national chairman Alhaji Abdulkadir Abdulsalam died in 2020, the party went through a serious leadership crisis. Barrister Julius Abure, who was the national secretary of the Labour Party, was elected as the new national chairman by the Labour Party National Executive Council (NEC) in 2021. The former deputy national chairman of the party, Calistus Okafor, challenged Barrister Julius Abure after he claimed to be the authentic national chairman of the party by virtue of his position.

=== 2022 ===
Former governor of Anambra State, Peter Obi, joined the party after leaving the Peoples Democratic Party a proactive decision prompted by his inability to gain the necessary support needed to win in the fast approaching PDP primaries. He emerged as the 2023 presidential candidate of the Labour party after Pat Utomi, Faduri Joseph and Olubusola Emmanuel-Tella stepped down from the contest, making him the only aspirant in the presidential primaries. Gbadebo Rhodes-Vivour emerged as the governorship candidate of the party in Lagos state.

=== 2023 ===
Just before the 2023 Nigerian general election, the party obtained the support of both the Nigeria Labour Congress and the Trade Union Congress of Nigeria. The trade union federations advised their members to vote for Peter Obi. This was the first time the trade union federations expressed explicit support for a political party. Alex Otti, the Labour Party governorship candidate in Abia State, became the only elected governor in the party in 2023.

=== Leadership Crises ===
In January 2026, the Federal High Court in Abuja held that Julius Abure’s tenure as Labour Party national chairman had expired and ordered INEC to recognize the caretaker committee led by Senator Nenadi Usman as the party’s valid leadership pending a convention; the Court of Appeal upheld this ruling in April 2026, imposing a N10 million cost against Julius Abure for abuse of judicial process.

== Party symbols ==
=== Party logo ===
The logo of the party is a wheel with a man and woman with a child engraved in the centre.

The wheel stands for industry and work as basis for economic empowerment of the populace and the prosperity of the nation, i.e. continuous economic growth and development. The linkage between the wheel, man, woman and child connotes that governance, economic and social development must lead to the advancement of human beings.

=== Party flag ===
The flag of the party is red and green, both equal in size, placed vertically, with red representing transformation and green representing agriculture. The logo of the party is at the centre of the flag.

== Election results ==
=== Presidential elections ===
Year	Party candidate	Running mate	Votes	%	Result
2019	Muhammed Usman Zaki	Chief Ezekiel Akpan	5,074	0.019%	Lost ✗
2023	Peter Obi	Yusuf Datti	6,101,533	25.40%	✗

=== House of Representatives and Senate elections ===
Election	House of Representatives		Senate	
Election	Seats	+/–	Seats	+/–
2003	0 / 360	New	0 / 109	New
2007	1 / 360	▲1	0 / 109	0
2011	8 / 360	▲7	4 / 109	▲4
2015	1 / 360	▼7	0 / 109	▼7
2019	1 / 360	0	0 / 109	0
2023	35 / 360	▲34	8 / 109	▲7

=== Gubernatorial elections ===
Year	State	Party candidate	Votes	Result
2007	Ondo State	Olusegun Mimiko	226,051	Won
2012	Ondo State	Olusegun Mimiko	260,199	Won
2023	Abia State	Alex Otti	175,467	Won
