= Unity Party of Nigeria =

- Leader: Obafemi Awolowo
- Founded: 1978
- Dissolved: 1983
- Preceded by: Action Group
- Headquarters: Ibadan
- Ideology: Social democracy Democratic socialism Awoism
- Political position: Centre-left

The Unity Party of Nigeria (UPN) was a Nigerian political party that was dominant in western Nigeria during the Second Republic (1979–1983). The party was led by Obafemi Awolowo and inherited its ideology from the Action Group. It described itself as a welfarist party, and free education was the centrepiece of its platform.

The desired goal of the military government of Olusegun Obasanjo to build national political parties led to a gradual weakening of ethnic politics in the second republic. The UPN, as well as the People's Redemption Party (PRP), presented the most coherent plan of action during the electioneering campaign of 1979. The party jettisoned building a coalition of comfort in a polarized political environment, but based partnerships on the cooperation of like-minded advocates of democratic socialism.

The Action Congress of Nigeria was regarded as a natural successor to the Action Group and UPN.

== Ideology ==
- The party supported a 30-40% revenue allocation for the Federal Government, 40-50% for the states and 10% for the local governments in debates centering on the intractable revenue allocation mechanism in Nigeria.
- Free education for all
- Free medical treatment
- Full employment
- Integrated rural development
- A progressive program for development of roads and schools, and
- Constitutional amendments for state creation, which implied longer time needed from initiation to approval.
