= Palace of Olowo of Owo =

Royal palace of the Yoruba kings of Owo

- Aghọfẹn Ọlọghọ
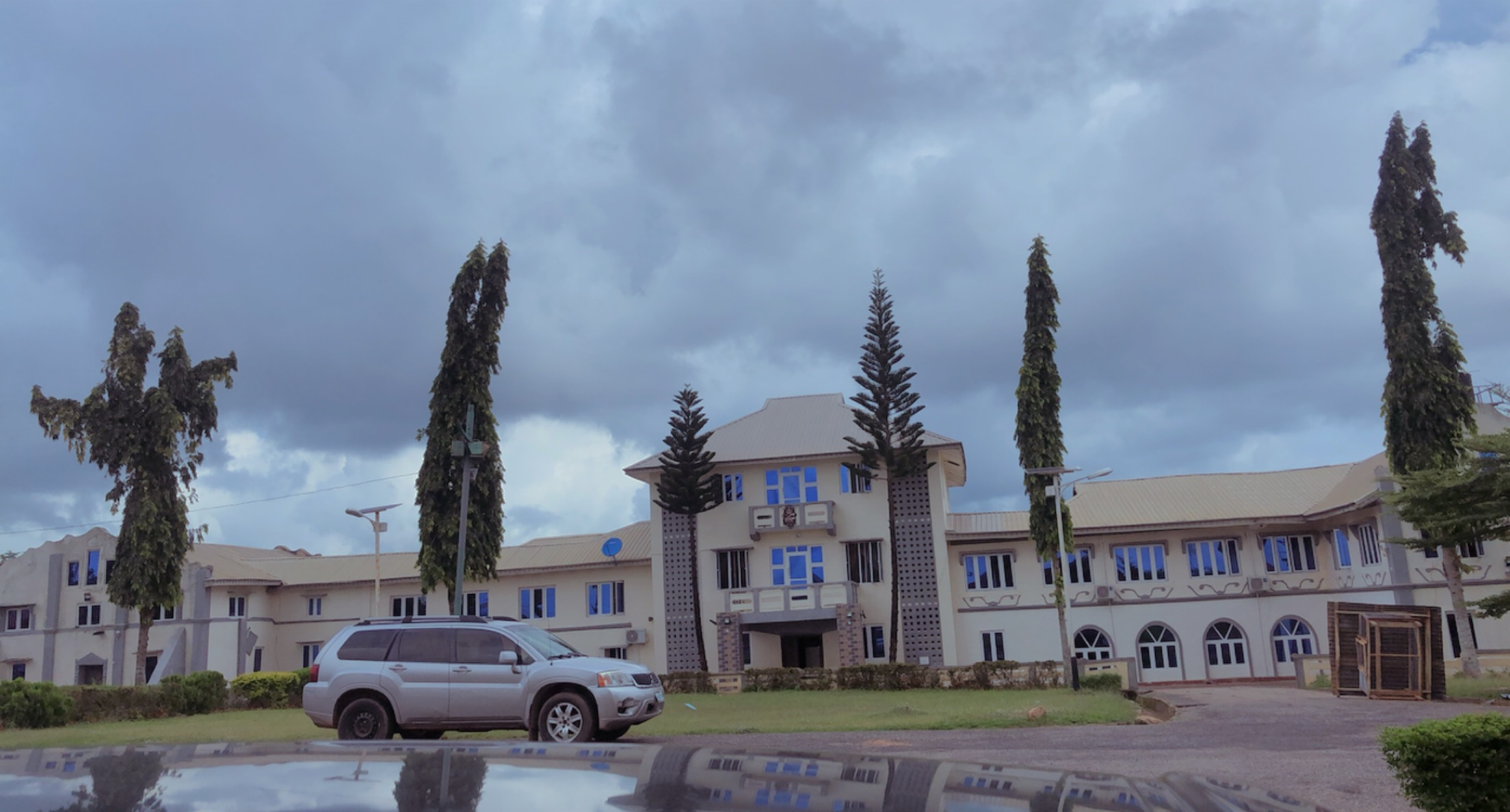
- Front side of inner main complex

- Location in Nigeria
- 07°11′46″N 05°35′11″E
- Cultures: Owo kingdom
- Location: Owo, Nigeria

History
- Built: 1340 (14th century)
- Built by: Ologho Rerengejen

Site notes
- Elevation: 350 m (1,150 ft)
- Architectural style: Yoruba architecture
- Website: https://owokingdom.org/

The Palace of Olowo of Owo, is the palace of the Olowo of Owo, the largest palace in Africa. It is located in Owo, a local government area in Ondo State, south western Nigeria. It was pronounced a national monument by the Nigerian government in 2000. The palace is culturally important and has been occupied by 14 Olowo who have ascended the throne since the palace's existence.

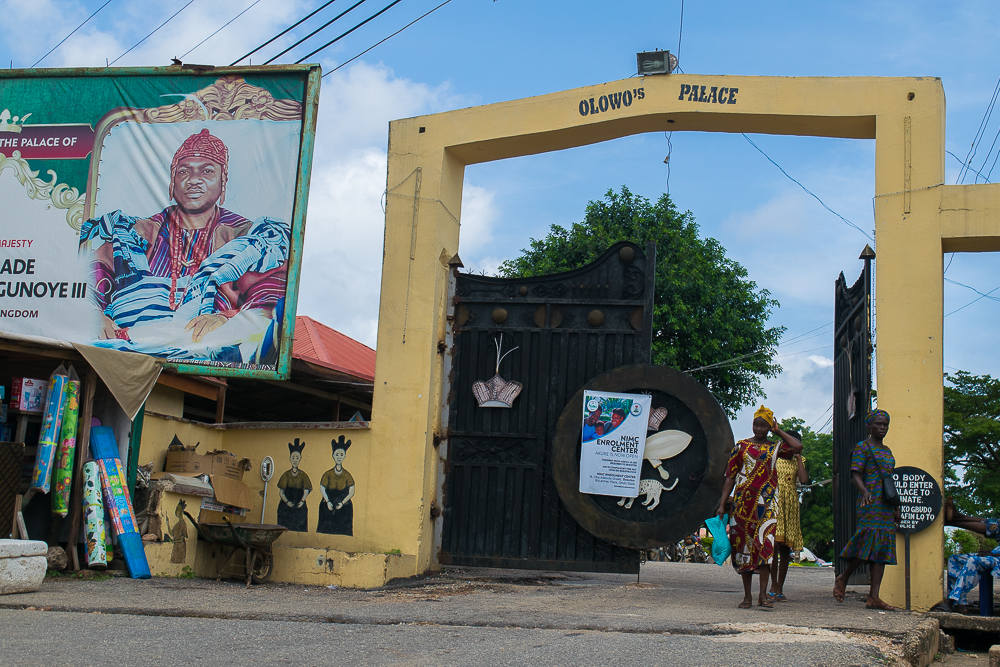
Olowo's Palace

== History ==
The palace was built during the reign of Olowo Irengenje in 1340 and has approximately 1,000 rooms, some of which served as shrines and places of worship of ancestors. 13 monarchs have used the palace since the first Olowo of Owo. They are (not in order): Oba Ojugbelu Arere, Rerengejen, Ajaka, Ajagbusi Ekun, Olagbegi Atanneye I, Olagbegi Atanneye II, Elewuokun, Olateru Olagbegi I, Olateru Olagbegi II, Ajike Ogunoye, Adekola Ogunoye II, and Folagbade Olateru Olagbegi III.

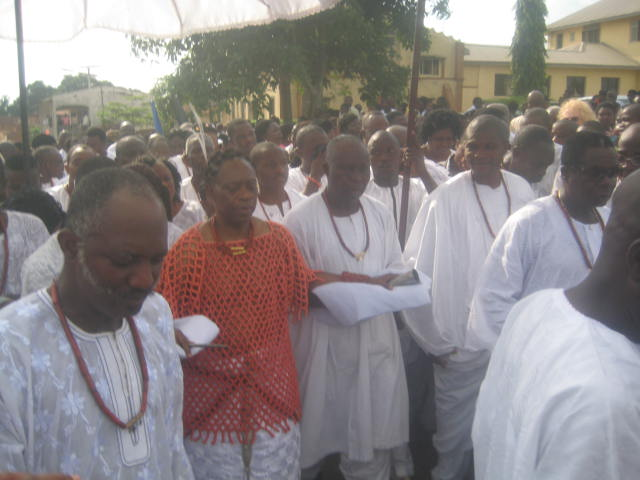
Folagbade Olateru Olagbegi (in red shirt) during the 2013 Igogo festival

Owo was regarded as the political Mecca of Yorubaland before Nigeria's independence. Notably, the Action Group, formerly known as the Egbe Omo Yoruba, was formed within the palace.

== The Palace as a cultural hub ==
The palace is an educational hub, offering programs that teach visitors about the history, culture, and traditions of the Yoruba people. The palace actively engages the local community through initiatives that highlight the talents of artisans, musicians and storytellers. Workshops and exhibitions are organised to allow residents to display their crafts and cultural practices.
