= Olagbegi family =

Royal family in Owo

The Olagbegi family is a royal family in Owo, a city in Ondo State, southwestern Nigeria. Members of the family are descendants of Olagbegi Atanneye I, the Olowo of Owo who reigned between 1913 and 1938. Olagbegi Atanneye was himself a descendant of Ojugbelu Arere, the first traditional ruler of Owo, who was a direct descendant of Oduduwa.

Olateru Olagbegi I, the son of Olagbegi Atanneye, had 300 wives during his reign. After his demise, it was discovered that five of them were still virgins. The family belongs to the Nigerian chieftaincy system.

== Notable members ==
- Olagbegi Atanneye I
- Olagbegi Atanneye II
- Olateru Olagbegi I
- Olateru Olagbegi II
- Folagbade Olateru Olagbegi III
- Gbemi Olateru Olagbegi
- Olubunmi Olateru Olagbegi
- Bukunyi Olateru-Olagbegi
