= Igogo Festival =

Yoruba festival in Owo, Nigeria

Igogo Festival Odun Igogo
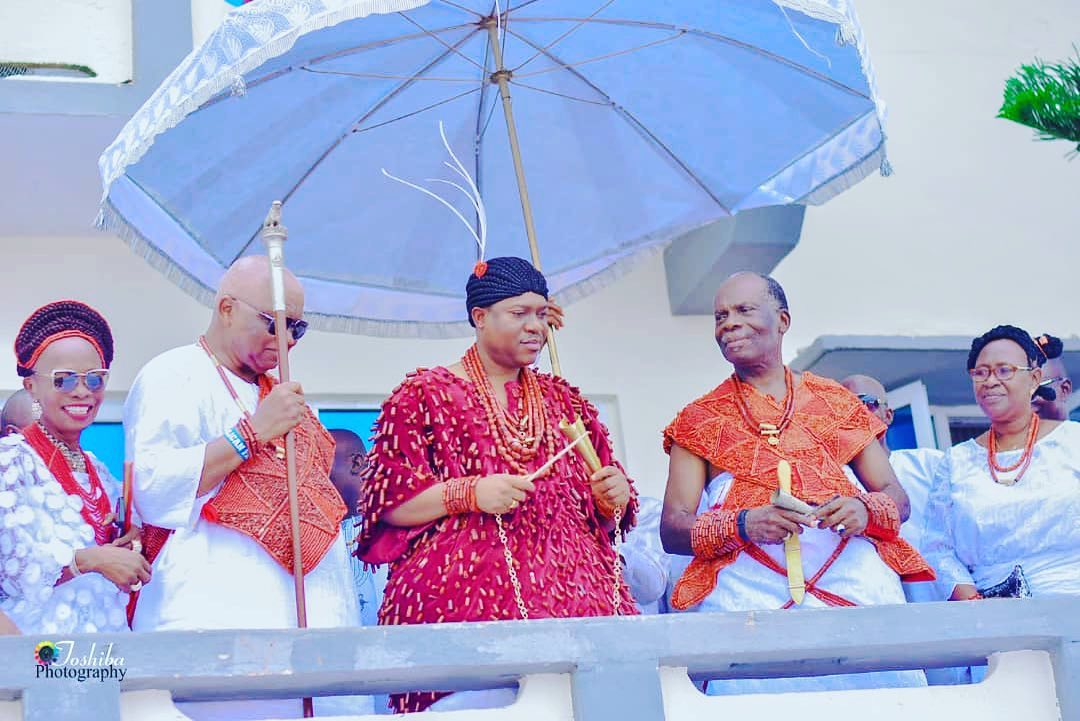
- Oba (Dr) Ajibade Gbadegesin Ogunoye III, the Olowo of Owo, during the 2020 festival
- Status: Active
- Genre: Festivals
- Begins: September
- Ends: October
- Frequency: Annually
- Years active: 1601–present
- Founder: Queen Oronsen
- Previous event: September 2020
- Next event: September 2021
- Area: Nigeria
- Olowo of Owo Kingdom: Olowo of Owo
- Organiser: People of Owo Kingdom
- Sponsor: Olowo of Owo, Ojomo Oluda, Owo Chiefs and Owo Sons and daughters

The Igogo festival is a Yoruba festival held in Owo, Nigeria. It is held annually in September to honor Queen Oronsen, a mythical wife of Rerengejen. During the festival, the incumbent Olowo of Owo, Oba Ajibade Gbadegesin Ogunoye III, and high chiefs of Owo Kingdom dress like women with coral beads, beaded gowns and plaited hair. The wearing of headgears and caps as well as the beating of drums and firing of guns are forbidden during the festival.

== Background ==
The origins of the Igogo festival began over 600 years ago during the reign of Olowo Rerengejen. The monarch married Oronsen, a queen who was, unknown to the king, an orisha. She enriched the monarch and she was loved by him as a result. Queen Oronsen declared that certain activities were taboo.

No one was allowed to grind okra (for stew) in her presence or pour water into the yard. She forbade people, arriving from the farm, to dump, or throw down, a load of firewood in her presence. King Rerengejen cautioned his other wives not to carry out any of these activities.

One day, Queen Oronsen had a disagreement with the other wives of the king. They conspired against her with the intention of violating her taboos while Rerengejen was not in the palace. Because her taboos were intentionally violated, she fled from the palace.

As she was making her escape, some palace guards and chiefs pursued, intending to return her to the palace, an effort that was ultimately futile. Becoming weary, she stopped at a place called "Ugbo Laja" where she was discovered and attempts were made to persuade her to return to the palace. Her refusal frustrated the guards, who forcefully captured her. But she escaped them and disappeared into "Igbo Oluwa", now a sacred forest, leaving her head ties (oja) at Ugbo Laja. The guards later returned them to King Rerengejen. "Ugbo Laja" is now a sacred grove.

A terra cotta sculptured image of Queen Oronsen was excavated from "Igbo Oluwa" by Ekpo Eyo (1931–2011), a Nigerian scholar and anthropologist. Her "image" stood at a distance to inform the Owo people that she will never return to the palace but that annually they should always sacrifice two hundred items of different articles, such as dried fish, colanut, alligator pepper, bitter cola and many more for the ritual (Igogo). In return she promised to protect the kingdom forever.

== Events ==
Igogo festival lasts for 17 days and begins with Upeli proceedings by the Iloro chiefs. The chiefs are led by a chief known as Akowa of Iloro, who is the traditional head of the Iloro chiefs. This Upeli procession lasts for 12 days and features several activities including Utegi, Ugbabo, Uyanna and Ugbate. It is also a period for the celebration of new yams.

During this procession, beating of drums by individuals or associations is forbidden and the use of caps by men and head ties by women at close range to the Owo monarch, the Olowo of Owo, is also prohibited. The festival features the dance of bare-chested men, the Iloro Quarter men called Ighares. They often wear white caps with two horns of buffalo in their hands. They strike these horns together while dancing around the town and visiting sacred places located in the town.

During this rite, any animal that crosses their paths will be viewed as food. The chiefs braid their hair and dance round the town, and visit their loved ones who give them gifts in return. The monarch often dresses like a woman and dances around the town. Dancing in the market by the monarch is also one of the rites performed during the festival.

== Gallery ==
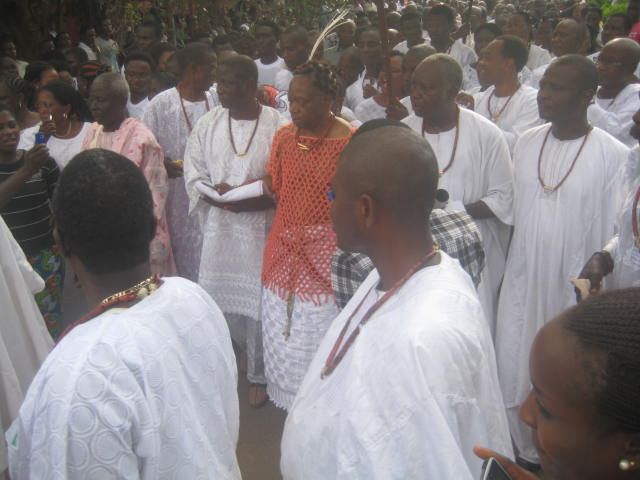
The Olowo of Owo on his way to "Igbo Laja" during the 2013 Igogo festival

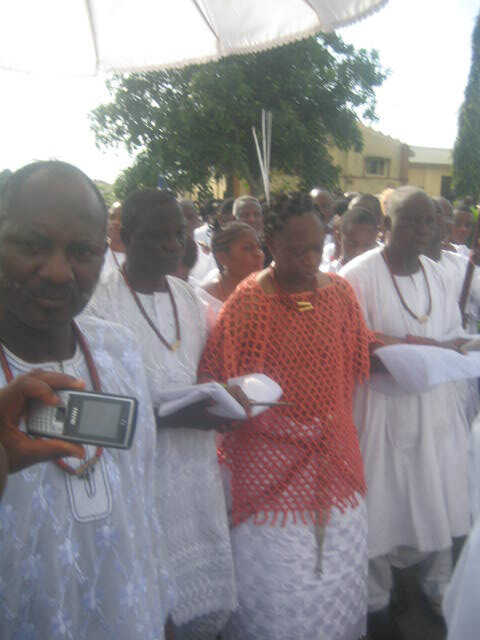
HRM Folagbade stepping out of the Palace to pay homage to Queen Oronsen during the 2013 Igogo festival

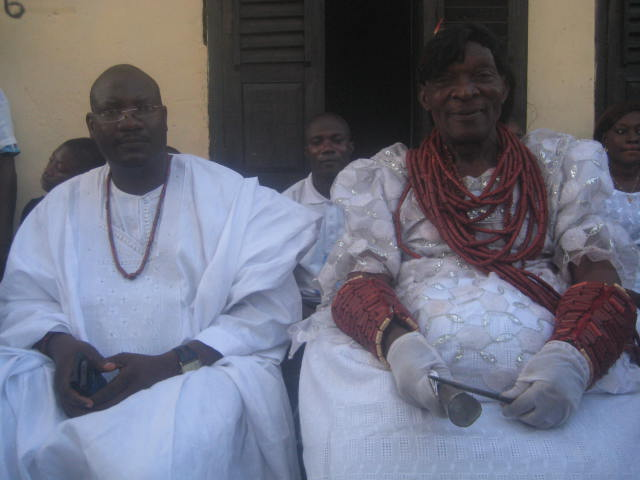
Prince Orimadegun Aragun Ogunoye and Chief Oronbato of Igboroko Quarter during the 2013 Igogo festival

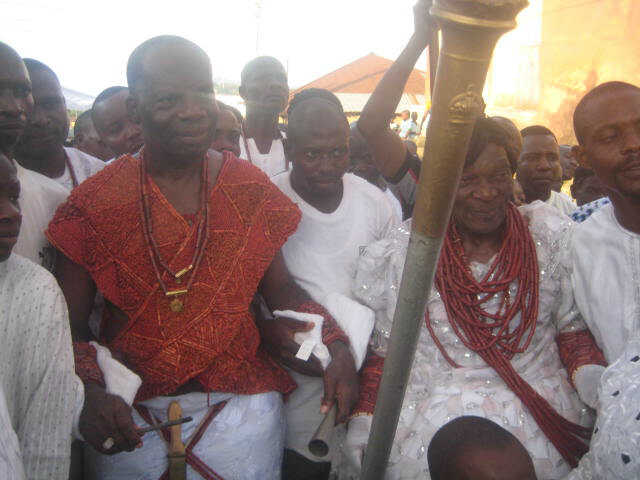
Kofoworola Oladoyinbo Ojomo, the incumbent Ojomo Oluda of Ijebu, Owo during Igogo festival

== See also ==
- Festivals in Nigeria
- Ojude Oba festival
- Badagry Festival
