= Ojomo Oluda =

Traditional ruler of Owo Kingdom

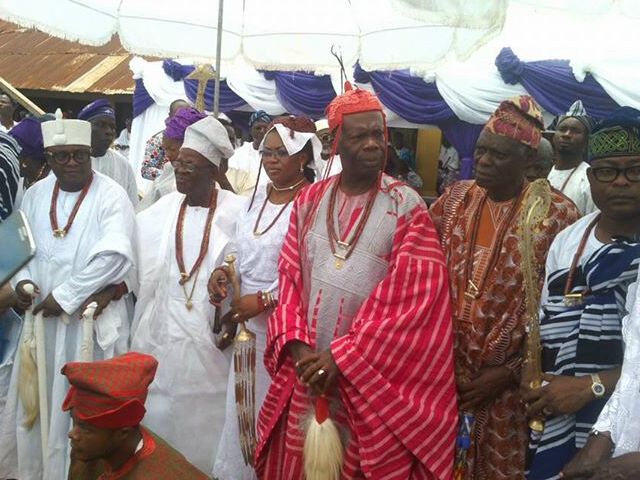
- Ogunoye during Igogo 2020 Festival in Owo
- Successor: Kofoworola Oladoyinbo Ojomo
- Born: Ojomo Oluda; Owo, Ondo State, Southwestern Nigeria
- Spouse: Queen Orosen
- Religion: Traditional Religion
- Occupation: The Yoruba king of Ijebu, Owo in Ondo State, southwestern Nigeria.

The Ojomo Oluda is the Yoruba king of Ijebu, Owo in Ondo State, southwestern Nigeria. The king is believed to be a descendant of Ojugbelu Arere, the pioneer Olowo of Owo. Ojomo Oluda also celebrates the Igogo festival with the incumbent Olowo of Owo since they are the descendants of the late Olowo Rerengejen, who married Oronsen, the goddess that brought about the annual Igogo festival.

== Early life ==
Ojomo Oluda was born in Ojomo Oluda, Owo. He is the Yoruba king of Ijebu-Owo in Ondo State, southwestern Nigeria.

== Ruling families ==
Ijebu, Owo is ruled by an heir appointed from the ruling families following an Ifá consultation and ratification by the Olowo of Owo. The king is often assisted by appointed chiefs collectively known as "Edibo Ojomo. According to the traditions of Ijebuland, the Ojomo Oluda is often appointed by senior omo ojomos and olori ebi omo ojomos, who are the kingmakers. The incumbent Ojomo Oluda is King Kofoworola Oladoyinbo Ojomo, who ascended the throne on June 13, 2004, following the demise of Agboola Ojomo Agunloye in May 2003.
