= Ogunoye =

Ògúnoyè
- Gender: Male
- Language: Yoruba

Origin
- Origin: Nigerian
- Meaning: Ògún of honour.
- Region of origin: South West, Nigeria

Ògúnoyè audiois a Nigerian surname. It is a male name and of Yoruba origin, which means "Ògún of honour.".Ògún is the Yorùbá god of iron. The name Ògúnoyè is a unique and culturally significant name and primarily used among the royal families of Ògún devotees.

== Notable individuals with the name ==
- Adekola Ogunoye II, Nigerian ruler
- Ajibade Gbadegesin Ogunoye III (born 1966), Nigerian ruler
- Ajike Ogunoye, Nigerian ruler
