= Owo Museum =

Museum in Owo, Nigeria

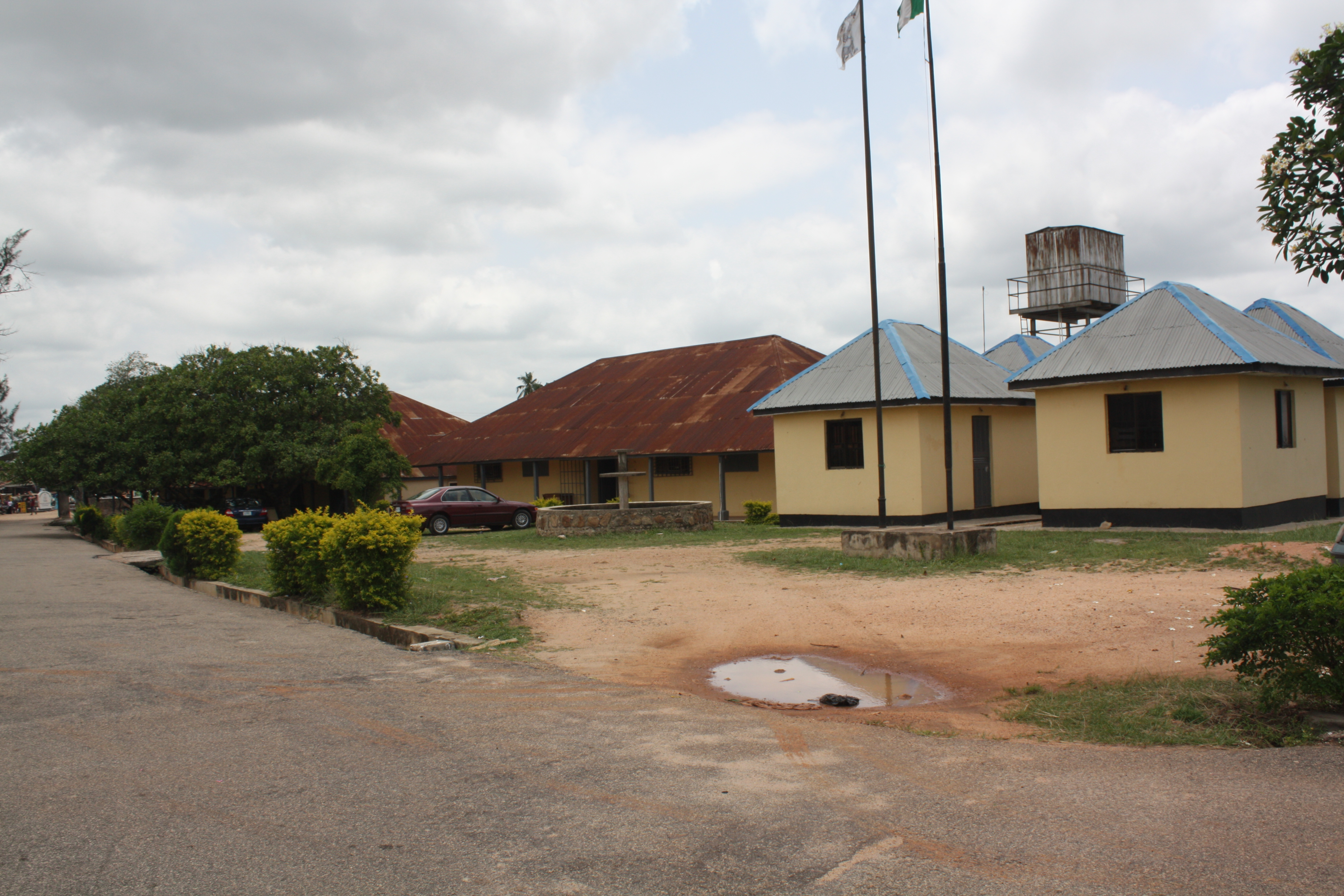
- Museum facade in 2014
- Established: 1968
- Location: Near to A122 Highway, Owo, Ondo State, Nigeria
- Coordinates: 7°11′48″N 5°35′08″E
- Collections: Significant archaeological artifacts and ethnographic materials discovered in the Owo area

The Owo Museum is a museum in Owo, Ondo state, Nigeria. The museum was founded in 1968, to accommodate the antiquities which were formerly in the Olowo Palace. The museum contains significant archaeological artifacts and ethnographic materials discovered in the Owo area. The Museum showcases Sculptures, and traditional regalia, offering visitors a deep understanding of the Yoruba people's lives, beliefs, and artistic customs. Through intricately carved ivory and impressive terracotta sculptures, the museum provides an engaging experience that emphasizes the remarkable craftsmanship and cultural richness central to Yoruba heritage.

The Owo site was first excavated in 1969–1971 by Ekpo Eyo under the auspices of the Department of Antiquities of the Government of Nigeria. Due to Owo's location between the two famous art centers of Ife and Benin, the site reflects both artistic traditions. Important discoveries include terracotta sculptures dating back from the 15th century.
