= Oreoluwa =

- Gender: Unisex

Origin
- Origin: Yoruba
- Meaning: A gift from God
- Region of origin: Southwest of Nigeria

Other names
- Variant form: Ore
- Short form: Ore
- Nickname: Orry

Oreoluwa is a Nigerian unisex given name with Yoruba origins, meaning "a gift from God". It is similar in meaning to Olubunmi, Ebunoluwa and Onyinyechi.

Notable people with the given name include:

- Nora Awolowo (real name Oreoluwa Awolowo; born 1999), Nigerian film director, cinematographer, documentary photographer, producer and creative director
- Oreoluwa Cherebin (born 1997), Grenadian swimmer
- Oreoluwa Lesi, Nigerian social entrepreneur, economist, and information technology expert

== See also ==
- Mo'Cheddah (real name Modupe-Oreoluwa Ola; born 1990), Nigerian rapper and singer
