= Ojomo =

Ojomo is both a given name and a surname. Notable people with the name include:

- Adewale Ojomo (born 1988), American football player
- Efosa Ojomo, Nigerian author
- Kofoworola Oladoyinbo Ojomo, Nigerian ruler
- Moro Ojomo (born 2001), Nigerian player of American football
- Agboola Ojomo Agunloye (died 2003), Nigerian ruler
