= Owo church attack =

2022 massacre in Nigeria

- Location: 7°11′40″N 5°35′02″E; Owo, Ondo State, Nigeria
- Date: 5 June 2022; 4 years ago
- Target: Christian worshippers at the St. Francis Xavier Catholic Church
- Attack type: Bombing, mass murder, mass shooting, religious violence
- Deaths: 41 - 80 confirmed 50+ (reported)
- Injuries: Unknown; 61+ (per government agencies)
- No. of participants: 5+
- Accused: Islamic State – West Africa Province

On 5 June 2022, a mass shooting and bomb attack occurred at a Catholic church in the city of Owo in Ondo State, Nigeria. At least 40 people were killed, with the highest estimates being around 80. Some in the federal government of Nigeria suspect the Islamic State – West Africa Province of carrying out the massacre.

== Background ==
Ondo State is a relatively peaceful state in southwestern Nigeria. Most of the rest of the country suffers low-intensity conflicts, including a jihadist insurgency by Boko Haram mostly in the northeast, and a conflict with bandits in the northwest, both of which have continued for more than a decade. A separate low-level insurgency in the southeast led by the Indigenous People of Biafra movement began in 2021. An increase in violence between farmers and nomads in Ondo had been recorded prior to the massacre, and the state's government had recently passed restrictions on grazing.

== Attack ==
The attack took place at the St. Francis Xavier Catholic Church in the Owo local government area and began at around 11:30 AM (GMT+1) as worshippers inside the church were attending Mass and celebrating Pentecost. A group of gunmen entered the church disguised as congregants, carrying bags that contained firearms. Another group took positions outside the church. Improvised explosive devices were detonated outside the church and both groups began firing on worshippers. Those outside the church shot directly into it while those disguised as congregants fired from inside, shooting a boy who was selling candy at the entrance and worshippers trying to reach two open sets of doors. The main entrance was locked and the gunmen inside shot at anyone who moved. Passersby also were struck by bullets. Videos of the inside of the church showed bodies of victims lying in pools of blood across the floor. After the attack the gunmen fled using a stolen Nissan Sunny.

A priest who survived the massacre said that the attack took place when the church "[was] about to round off service. I had even asked people to start leaving, that was how we started hearing gunshots from different angles. We hid inside the church but some people had left when the attack happened. We locked ourselves in the church for 20 minutes. When we heard that they had left, we opened the church and rushed victims to the hospital." Fr Andrew Adeniyi Abayomi said he tried to protect parishioners, I remained in the inner part of the sacristy. I could not run as I was surrounded by children, while some adults clung to me, some even inside my chasuble. I shielded them just as a hen shields her chicks. "Another priest who had temporarily left the building prior to the attack said he was walking back to the church when survivors running outside stopped him and told him that a massacre was taking place inside.

A witness said that he saw five gunmen who perpetrated the attack. Two police officers were killed.

== Casualties ==
The National Emergency Management Agency (NEMA) said on 7 June that at least 22 dead bodies from the attack were in the local hospital's morgue, including two children, and that at least 58 had been injured. Many of the dead bodies at the church had been taken by their family members to a private burial at home, indicating a higher death toll. (Note: A witness also told CNN that many of the congregants of the Igbo minority "carried their dead back to the southeast of the country.") On 9 June the government revised its death toll to at least 40, saying that 61 injured survivors were still in the hospital. Another wounded victim died of his injuries later on. At least five children are confirmed to have been killed.

Witnesses and media agencies placed the number of people killed at over 50. Local politician Adelegbe Timileyin said there were over 50 fatalities including children, while other sources estimated a higher death count. A doctor said that at least 50 bodies had been recovered. Timileyin also said that the priest had been abducted, which the Roman Catholic Diocese of Ondo denied. The Diocese's reverend clarified that the priest and other clergymen were safe. Ondo State House of Assembly majority leader Oluwole Ogunmolasuyi visited the attack site and counted at least 20 dead, estimating the death toll at somewhere between 70 and 100. Doctors told reporters that the attack had caused a mass-casualty incident and the local hospitals were overwhelmed with victims. ABC News cited an unnamed source who reported there were bodies of 82 victims stored in a local morgue while another source briefed on the recent U.S. intelligence assessment estimated deaths to be above 80.

== Aftermath ==
Governor of Ondo State, Rotimi Akeredolu, who was on a trip to Abuja, rushed back and went to the scene of the attack; he called it "vile and satanic", as well as a "black Sunday in Owo". Akeredolu vowed to "commit every available resource to hunt down these assailants and make them pay". President of Nigeria, Muhammadu Buhari, condemned the massacre, saying it was a "heinous attack on worshippers". Pope Francis prayed for the victims who were "painfully stricken in a moment of celebration". The rebel Indigenous People of Biafra organization, which seeks to restore the separatist Igbo state of Biafra, called the attack as an "unacceptable" action and an Islamic terror attack, asserting that "Christians should stop their dependence on government of Nigeria for security of life and properties... The current regime has only one interest and that is [the] Fulani interest." IPOB said that Biafran separatist groups should defend churches in Southern Nigeria.

The massacre was received with widespread shock from the Nigerian public. The response by President Buhari and his All Progressives Congress party was criticized as inadequate, and Buhari sparked controversy after he was caught hosting a party with other APC members hours after the attack. The Amotekun Corps announced deployment of its forces to protect churches and mosques in the state on 12 June. Local elders, including Owo's king Ajibade Gbadegesin Ogunoye III, attempted to calm anger among the residents after the massacre in order to prevent reprisal attacks.

The attack made headlines across the world, with Catholic charity Aid to the Church in Need issuing a statement that read: "ACN denounces this outburst of violence, yet another terrorist act in Nigeria, one more on the long list of crimes against Christians. The country in general has been rocked by episodes of violence, banditry and kidnappings that, although affecting all ethnic and religious groups in the nation, have led to a long list of major attacks on the Christian community over the last few decades (...) ACN calls on all political and religious leaders in the world to firmly and explicitly condemn this terrorist attack at the St. Francis Xavier Catholic Church, Owo, Ondo State, in southwest Nigeria, during Pentecost Sunday celebrations."

In October 2022, Bishop Jude Arogundade of Ondo backed a petition by the UK office of ACN asking the UK Government to call on their Nigerian counterparts to bring to justice those responsible for the massacre and other similar atrocities.

A state funeral for the victims was organized by Nigerian authorities on 17 June. As the funeral mass was held, Akeredolu promised to improve the security situation in the state and admitted that he bore responsibility for failing to provide security. Bishop Jude Arogundade of the Roman Catholic Diocese of Ondo criticized the Buhari Administration for "empty promises" regarding maintaining security and preventing terrorism, telling the funeral-goers they needed to "claim this country back from those destroying it." Bishop Emmanuel Badejo, who was among the officiating clergy at the mass funeral, demanded that the government "wake up, sit up and act up to secure lives and properties all over Nigeria."

== Culpability ==
No group has yet claimed responsibility, while numerous Owo locals from the Yoruba ethnic group have accused members of the Hausa and Fulani herdsmen groups of complicity. Police found three undetonated improvised explosive devices at the scene, as well as several shells from AK-47 ammunition.

The federal government of Nigeria said Islamic State – West Africa Province (ISWAP) was behind the attack on 9 June. Interior Minister Rauf Aregbesola said police were pursuing the culprits. Akeredolu said the government's allegation was "too hasty" since ISWAP tends to take responsibility for its attacks.

The Amotekun Corps on 23 June announced that it had arrested some of the suspects and seized evidentiary weapons and vehicles. In August 2022, the Nigerian military announced the arrests of another six suspects and added that one of them was an ISWAP leader who was planning more attacks. Akeredolu meanwhile announced the arrest of a person accused of having provided housing to the suspects before the attack was carried out.

A trial for five suspects accused of membership in Al-Shabaab and charged with nine counts of terrorism was scheduled to begin at a federal high court in Abuja on 19 August 2025, but was postponed indefinitely after the court on that day granted a request from prosecutors, who cited the Attorney-General's decision to request for a new lead counsel for the case.

On June 3, 2026, a federal court sentenced four people affiliated with Al-Shabaab to death for their involvement in the massacre. A fifth person was acquitted.

== See also ==
- List of massacres in Nigeria
- Religious violence in Nigeria
- Boko Haram insurgency
