= Royal titles of Yoruba monarchs =

This is a list of the royal titles of Yoruba monarchs. It is not in the order of seniority.

- Alake of Egbaland
- Olubadan
- Olowo of Owo
- Owa of Otan Ayegbaju
- Osemawe of Ondo Kingdom
- Orangun
- Olomu of omu-aran
- Oba of Lagos
- Alaafin of Oyo
- Ooni of Ife
- Olofin Adimula of Ado-Odo
- Owa Obokun Adimula of Ijeshaland
- Owatapa of Itapa Ekiti
- Olumushin of Mushinland
- Orimolusi of Ijebu Igbo
- Awujale of Ijebu Ode
- Awujale of Ise
- Akarigbo of Sagamu
- Oluwo of Iwo
- Jegun of Ile-Oluji
- Soun of Ogbomoso
- Ayangburen of Ikorodu
- Oloko of Ijebu-Imushin
- Moyegeso of Itele
- Alaketu of Ketu
- Ogunsua of Modakeke
- Alakan of Aiyepe
- Dagburewe of Idowa
- Elese of Ilese
- Deji of Akure Kingdom
- Ataoja of Oshogbo
- Sopen Lukale of Oke Sopen, Ijebu Igbo
- Beje Roku of Oke Agbo, Ijebu Igbo
- Kegbo of Atikori, Ijebu Igbo
- Olokine of Ojowo, Ijebu Igbo
- Abijaparako of Japara, Ijebu Igbo
- Okere of Saki
- Olobu of Ilobu
- Oluresi of Iresi
- Timi of Ede
- Elemure of Emure-Ekiti
- Owa Ajero of Ijero Ekiti
- Ewi of Ado Ekiti
- Oluyin of Iyin Ekiti
- Alara of Aramoko
- Ogoga of Ikere Ekiti
- Alaaye of Efon Ekiti
- Olojido of Ido Ekiti
- Alayetoro of Ayetoro Ekiti
- Oluloro of Iloro Ekiti
- Amapetu of Mahin
- Obaleo of Erinmope Ekiti
- Oba Elekole of Ikole Ekiti
- Attah of Aiyede Ekiti
- Onisan of Isan Ekiti
- Olota of Otta, Aworiland
- Ogeloyinbo of Aiyetoro, Ilaje LGA, Ondo state.
- Onilala of Lanlate
- Eleruwa of Eruwa
- Olu of Igboora
- Onidere of Idere
- Elempe of Tapa
- Ashawo of Ayite
- Ashigangan of Igangan
- Shabiganna of Iganna
- Aseyin of Iseyin
- Onjo of Okeho
- Elero of Ilero
- Olufi of Gbongan
- Ologotun of Ogotun-Ekiti
- Olubaka of Oka-Akoko
- Owa-ale of ikare-Akoko
- Olusin of owalusin
- Ogiyan of Ejigbo (Osun state)
