= Badagry Festival =

Festival in Nigeria

- Status: active
- Genre: Festivals
- Begins: August
- Ends: August
- Frequency: Annually
- Locations: Badagry, Lagos State
- Country: Nigeria
- Previous event: August 2015
- Next event: August 2016
- Leader: Oba Akran
- Organiser: African Renaissance
- Sponsor: MTN
- Website: www.badagryfestival.com

Badagry Festival is an annual event held in Badagry, a town in Lagos State, Nigeria. It is organised by the African Renaissance Foundation (AREFO). The event reflects the significance of the ancient town during the slave trade era. It is a convergence of culture and display of African heritage. The organizer brings the indigene and culture-loving fans from around the world to celebrate the festival. One of the major highlights is the artistic display by masquerades, dancers, and fire eaters. It features football competition, the beating of Sato drum, and Liberation Day Celebration.

== History ==
The festival was initiated in 1999 to commemorate the end of the slave trade era and the significance of the ancient city during the period.

The SATO Drum

The SATO Drum is a traditional drum usually beaten during celebrations, it is 3m tall and is played with 7 sticks.

It is believed that the drum is played by orphans. The Sato drum became popular when it was played in Kaduna in 1972.

== Badagry Festival 2015 ==
The 2015 Badagry festival started with a symposium tagged "Toussaint L'Ouverture: The Catalyst for the struggle for liberation of the black". The symposium was dedicated to the memory of the late Haitian revolutionary Toussaint L"Ouverture who created the first black republic in the Western Hemisphere on August 23, 1971.

The event started on 20 August and ended on 30 August 2015. The festival creates a platform in Nigeria for those from the African diaspora to reunite with their motherland. It was held at Badagry Grammar School, Badagry, Lagos, Nigeria. The festival coincidentally fell on August 22 which was declared by UNESCO in 1988 as the International Day for the Remembrance of the Slave Trade and its Abolition.

=== Badagry Festival 2016 ===
The festival started on the 23rd till 27 August 2016 with an international symposium on Olaudah Equiano. The symposium was dedicated to Olaudah Equiano who was a former slave boy that was kidnapped at the age of 11 and taken to europe who later bought his own freedom in 1766. His autobiography "The Interesting Narrative of the Life of Olaudah Equiano; or, Gustavus Vassa, the African in 1789 became very famous for its exposure into the description of life in Nigeria and abolition stand against slave trade.

The festival has as theme ‘African Diaspora and the Future of Africa’. The Administrative Staff College of Nigeria Topo, Badagry was used for the event at first. But, the festival grand finale took place on Saturday, August 27 at Badagry Grammar School and features a milieu of cultural extravaganza and music.

=== City slave history ===
The name Badagry derives from the means of livelihood of the indigenous people of the city, which include fishing, farming, salt making. However, others believe the city was named after Agbada, a popular farmer, whose farm was named Agbadagrimeh, which was later pronounced Badagry by the Europeans.

In the early 18th century Badagry served as a route for the Europeans when slaves were transported to the new destination of their buyers. It houses the cenotaph "Point of No Return", now called Gberefu village, a place where the well was enchanted to ensure that slaves who drank from it forgot their destinations. At the end of the 18th century, Badagry was one of the routes that benefited from the recurrent battle between Port novo and Dahomey for the movement of slaves. Badagry was noted as the auction point for slaves captured during inter-village warfare. Chief Mobee (died 1893) was among the African chiefs who participated in the slave trade, and the Mobee Royal Family Slave Relics Museum documents his association with the slave trade.

The first two-storey building was built in Marina, Badagry, in 1845. Presently, the site is facing massive environmental degradation due to lack of maintenance by the government, as well as the activities of commercial tree fellers. The government of Babatunde Fashola in an effort to reignite the glory of the city has started the construction of Badagry Expressway project, commissioning of Badagry Marina project.

== See also ==
- Ojude Oba festival
- Igogo festival
- Badagry
- Lagos-Badagry Expressway
