= Bisi Olateru-Olagbegi =

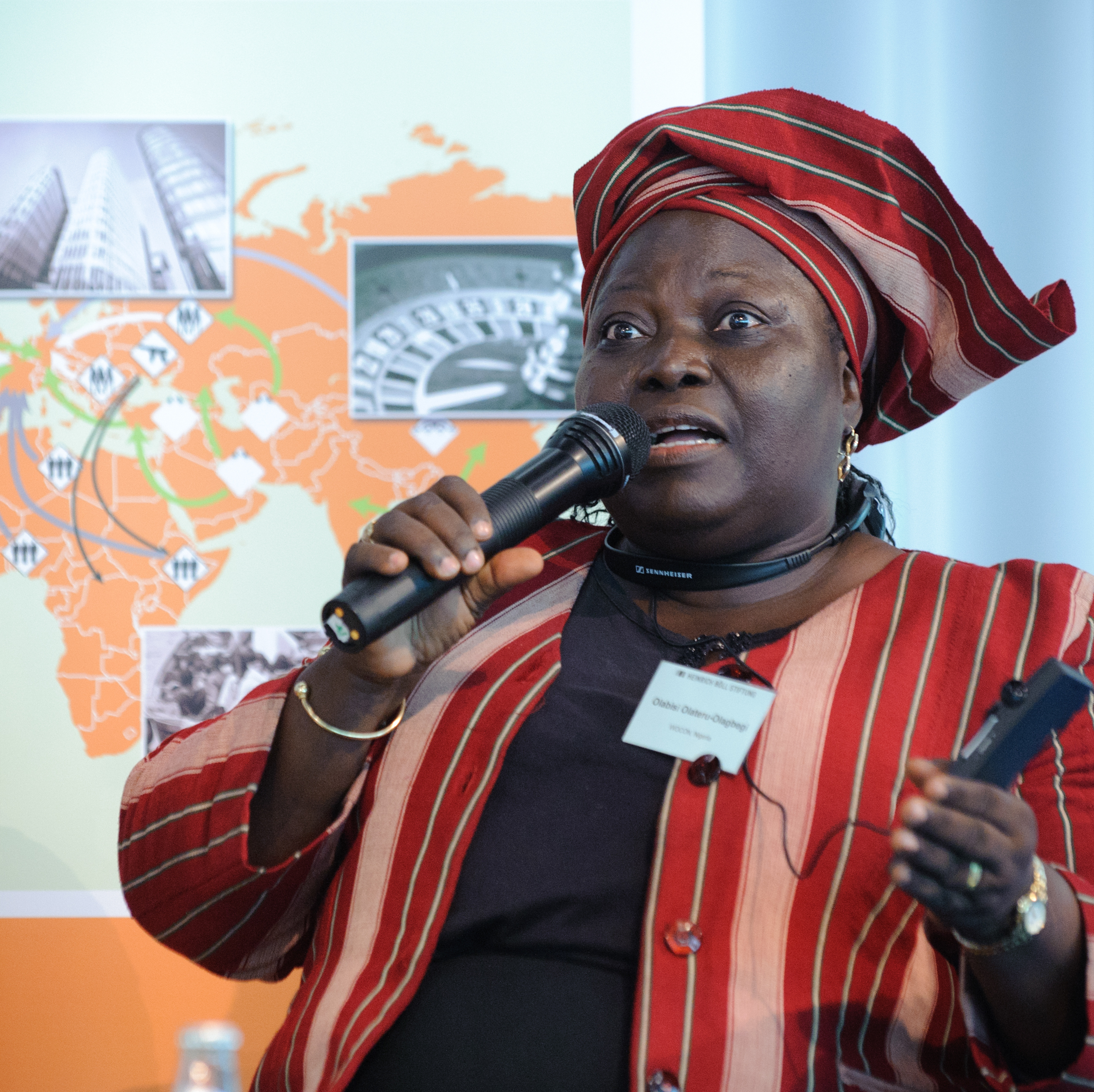
- Born: August 4, 1953
- Died: December 17, 2015 (aged 62)
- Occupations: Lawyer and activist
- Spouse: Folagbade Olateru Olagbegi III
- Children: four

Bisi Olateru-Olagbegi (4 August 1953 – 17 December 2015) was a Nigerian activist and the Director of the Women Consortium of Nigeria (WOCON). She was a prolific writer and author of the book "Path to Women’s Development: Thoughts, Vision and Passion (Lagos: WOCON, 2013)."

== Life ==
She was born in 1953 and she trained to be a lawyer. Whilst she was at law school she met and married one of the lecturers, Folagbade Olateru Olagbegi III. Her husband eventually became the traditional ruler of Owo and their four children, Kiitan, Bamarajo, Olasimbo and Olafusi, were to become princes and princesses.

She was fluent in Yoruba and English. She was called to the bar in Nigeria in 1976. She was a Chartered Arbitrator and a registered Notary.

She published over 50 different publications, but she was known particularly for her expertise on gender issues including FGM and gender violence. She also had expertise with regard to human trafficking, forced labour and other human rights issues.

She was known for directing the Women Consortium of Nigeria (WOCON) which she co-founded in 1995. She was a member of the boards of several NGOs. WOCON campaigned for women's rights and the United Nations gave the organisation consultative status.
