= Kofoworola =

Kofoworola is a given name. Notable people with the name include:

- Kofoworola Ademola (1913–2002), Nigerian educationist
- Kofoworola Bucknor (born 1939), Nigerian politician
- Kofoworola Oladoyinbo Ojomo, Nigerian ruler
- Kofoworola Abeni Pratt (1915–1992), Nigerian nurse
