= Olateru Olagbegi II =

King of Owo in Nigeria

Olowo Olateru Olagbegi II (Ologho)

Olowo of Owo
- Reign: 1941-1968 AD
- Predecessor: Ajike Ogunoye
- Successor: Adekola Ogunoye II
- Born: Ondo State South-Western Nigeria
- Died: October 1998; Owo
- House: Olagbegi
- Religion: Traditional religion Christianity

Oba Sir Olateru Olagbegi II (August 1910 – 1998) was the King (Olowo) of Owo, a city which was once the capital of an Eastern Yoruba city state in Nigeria.

== Personal life ==
He had 300 wives and fathered over 140 children which they include 35 Lawyers (many of whom were Senior Advocates), 10 High Court Judges, 25 Medical Doctors, 22 Chartered Accountants, and 23 Engineers. and among other professions.

== Early life and career ==
Sir Olateru Olagbegi II (born August 1910) was the paramount ruler of Owo Kingdom in Ondo State, southwestern Nigeria, from 1938 to 1941, succeeding Ajike Ogunoye. Sir Olateru Olagbegi II died in October 1998 and was succeeded by Olowo Adekola Ogunoye II.

He was appointed Olowo in 1941 and ruled for 25 years before he was deposed. His exile from power was a fallout of a regional crisis between two Action Group leaders: Awolowo and Samuel Ladoke Akintola. The Action Group which was launched in his palace a decade earlier, was led by Awolowo in the 1950s. A battle of wills between the two gladiators in the early 1960s saw Oba Olateru pitching his tent with Akintola.

However, his choice only fomented tension in his community. A military coup in 1966 created an avenue for some citizens of Owo to unleash violence and revolt against Olagbegi. He was banished from power in 1966 by the military administrator of the Western Region and re-instated 25 years later.

== Later career ==
When elective politics began in the Western region in 1951, Olagbegi was one of the prominent traditional rulers who supported the Action Group and who was involved in the politics of that era. The Action Group's public launch was at his palace in 1951. In 1962, two factions emerged within the party; the Akintola group led by the regional premier, Ladoke Akintola, and the Awolowo group led by the previous premier, Obafemi Awolowo. Olagbegi sided with the Akintola group, pitching him against his erstwhile friend Michael Ajasin, a member of the House of Representatives, and the majority of the community members who were still behind Awolowo. In his push to solidify support for Akintola in Owo, he was met with significant opposition. Many Owo residents did not support his opposition and displacement of the co-regent at Ijebu-Owo and the use of police force at the nearby village of Isho. When a military coup cut short the First Republic, a public revolt by Awolowo supporters and the Owo community led to the open display of violence within Owo, forcing the military governor, Adekunle Fajuyi to suspend the Olowo. The Olowo then went into exile in Ibadan. In 1968, he returned to Owo but strong opposition to his rule forced him back into exile. He was finally removed from office by the next governor, Adeyinka Adebayo in 1969.

In 1993, he was re-appointed to his former title of Olowo after the death of the reigning monarch.

He was knighted in the Queen's Birthday Honours in 1960.

He died in October 1998 and the crown passed to his son Oba Folagbade Olateru Olagbegi III.
