= Ijebu, Owo =

Ijebu
- Town
- Location within Nigeria
- Coordinates: 7°11′N 5°35′E
- Country: Nigeria
- State: Ondo State Southwestern Nigeria

Government
  - Type: Civilian
- Time zone: UTC+1 (WAT)
- Postal code: 341105

Ijebu-Owo is one of the five quarters that together make up the township of Owo, in Owo local government area of Ondo State, south-western Nigeria. The transmission of courtly culture flowed in both directions between Owo and Benin kingdoms from the seventeenth century till date. Oral tradition claimed that the founders of Owo and Ijebu-Owo were the descendants of Ojugbelu Arere, the first Olowo of Owo who was a descendant of Oduduwa, the pioneer ruler of Ile-Ife. The king of the Ijebu-Owo is called Ojomo Oluda and the incumbent Ojomo Oluda is Oba (King) Kofoworola Oladoyinbo Ojomo, a retired General of the Nigerian Army.

== History ==
Founding as a Quarter of Ow

== Notable people ==
- Olagbegi Atanneye I. The first paramount ruler of Owo Kingdom.
- Agboola Ojomo Agunloye II. Was the second paramount Yoruba king of Ijebu-Owo in Ondo State.
- Kofoworola Oladoyinbo Ojomo. He ascended to the throne as the paramount Yoruba king of Ijebu following the death of King Ijebu II.
- Engr Richard Omotayo Adewale(ASAE)
