= Olagbegi Atanneye II =

Traditional ruler of the Owo Kingdom

- Olowo of Owo
- Born: Owo, present-day Ondo State, Nigeria
- House: Olagbegi dynasty
- Religion: Yoruba traditional religion

Olagbegi Atanneye II was an Olowo of Owo, the traditional ruler of the Owo Kingdom in present-day Ondo State, Nigeria. He was a member of the Olagbegi ruling dynasty and is traditionally regarded as the father of Olagbegi Atanneye I and Ajike Ogunoye.

== Reign ==
His descendants continued the Olagbegi royal line, with his son, Folagbade Olateru Olagbegi III, later ascending the throne as Olowo of Owo.

== Legacy ==
Olagbegi Atanneye II occupies an important place in the history of the Owo Kingdom as an ancestor of later Olowos from the Olagbegi dynasty, one of the principal royal houses of Owo.
