= Olubunmi =

Olubunmi is a Yoruba given name meaning "gift of God". Other variations of the names are Bunmi, Oluwabunmi. Alternative forms of this name include: "Ebunoluwa" and "Oreoluwa". Notable people with this name include:

- Anthony Olubunmi Okogie (born 1936), Catholic cardinal
- Olubunmi Akinlade, Nigerian Anglican bishop
- Olubunmi Ayodeji Adetunmbi (born 1955), Nigerian politician
- Olubunmi Olateru-Olagbegi, former Chief judge of Ondo State
- Ogunlola Olubunmi (born 1965), Nigerian politician
- Olubunmi Owoso (1949–2020), Nigerian academic
- Olubunmi Tunji-Ojo (born 1982), Nigerian politician

== Film ==
- Mercy Olubunmi, fictional character in EastEnders
