= Olowo Imade =

Nigerian royal history

Olowo Imade (Ologho)

Olowo of Owo
- Reign: 1070–1106AD
- Predecessor: Ojugbelu Arere
- Successor: Olowo Korodo
- Born: Ondo State South-Western Nigeria
- Died: 1106AD; Owo
- House: Olowo of Owo
- Father: Ojugbelu Arere
- Religion: Traditional Religion

Olowo Imade succeeded his father, Ojugbelu at Okiti Upafa (Upafa Hills). He led his people to Oke-Made (Made-Hills) where they had a short-lived stay mainly due to wars and incessant thunderstorms which caused several fatalities of the Omo-lowos. They eventually moved to Okiti-Asegbo (present day center of Owo town) and expanded to the southern part of town where Olowo Imade along with the Ighare warriors/chiefs conquered the land and settled. The area was designated the Iloro (Uloro) quarters. Today, the 12 Iloro (Ighare) Chiefs are responsible for the installation and burial of the Olowo.

Olowo Imade is credited for naming the Owo Kingdom and establishing the Olowo Title. The meaning of Olowo means "He who Deserves Respect"

== Succeeded ==
Olowo Imade died in 1106 AD at Owo and was succeeded by Olowo Korodo.
