= Women Consortium of Nigeria =

Women Consortium of Nigeria (WOCON) is a non-profit organisation headquartered in Lagos, Nigeria. It was established by the late Chief Olabisi Olateru-Olagbegi in 1993 for the promotion of the rights of women and children in Nigeria. WOCON lead the campaign against women trafficking in Nigeria on the 8 of March 1996 after research conducted earlier that year in partnership with the United Nations".
