= Queen Oronsen =

Orisha from Yoruba mythology

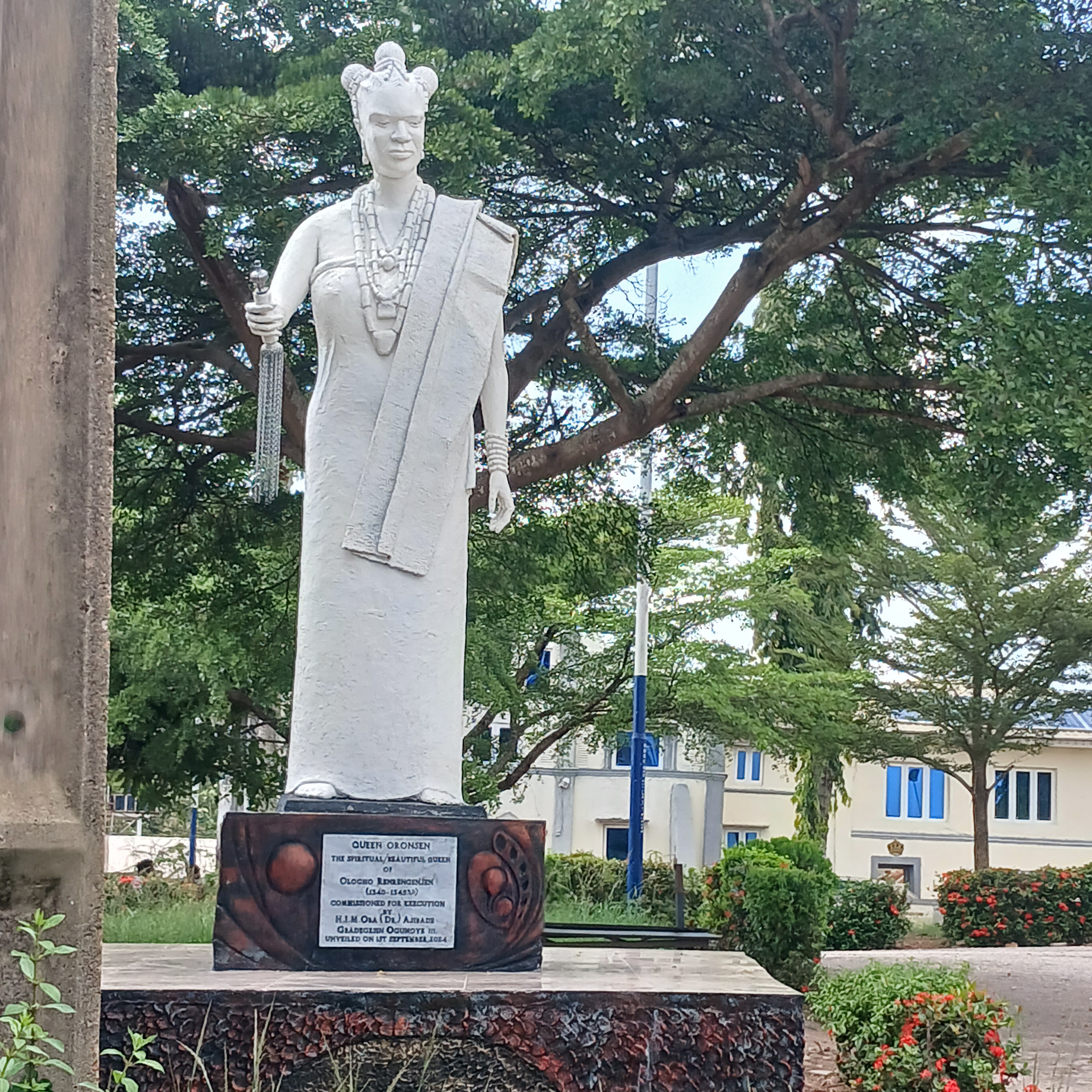

Genealogy
- Born: Oronsen; Owo. Ondo State Nigeria
- Spouse: Olowo Rerengejen

Oronsen is an orisha in Yoruba tradition. She was the queen of Owo and spouse of Olowo Rerengejen. The annual Igogo festival in Owo is celebrated in her honour.

== A Series Of Excerpts From The Oral Records Of Owo ==
Some 600 years ago, King Rerengejen of Owo met a young maiden by the name of Oronsen during one of his hunting expeditions. Instantly taken with her beauty, he subsequently took her back to his palace and had her installed as a member of his harem. After their marriage, Oronsen revealed her true nature to her husband: rather than merely being a maiden, Oronsen was in fact an orisha.

The king was scandalized. Ordinarily, consorting with the gods as he had been doing with her would have led to an immediate death. Oronsen told him not to fear her. She was happy with him, and would therefore gladly remain on Earth as one of his wives, if he made certain that three of her unbreakable taboos were never violated. Rerengejen promised that he would do so, and later warned both his senior wife and other wives to never break the taboos.

The king and his divine queen became even closer than they had been before after this revelation was made, and Oronsen soon blessed her husband's entire household with abundant wealth. One day, while Rerengejen was out hunting, Oronsen had a disagreement with the other queens, and they in turn violated her three taboos in an attempt to spite her.

Crying out in pain, Oronsen fled the palace thereafter, and the chiefs and guards that set out to find her and bring her back found that their efforts ultimately proved to be futile. When the king returned from the hunt, he was informed of what had happened in his absence and, being greatly grieved, set out to search for his wife himself.

After four days and four nights of searching, he finally found her in a forest. Rerengejen begged Oronsen to return with him, but she sadly told him that having been betrayed, she would never again live in the world of mankind. She then asked him to institute a ceremony of remembrance in her honour, so that she would bless Owo and guard it for all of time. The heartbroken king agreed to do so, and indeed later gave the order creating the ceremony upon his return to the palace. This is why the Owos have celebrated the Igogo festival from that day to this one.

== See also ==
- Melusine, European analogue and legendary progenatrix
