= Agboola Ojomo Agunloye =

Paramount Yoruba king of Ijebu, Owo in Ondo State, southwestern Nigeria

HRH John Agboola Ojomo

Ojomo Oluda of Ijebu, Owo
- Predecessor: Olateru Olagbegi I
- Successor: Kofoworola Oladoyinbo Ojomo
- Born: Ijebu, Owo, Ondo State Nigeria
- Died: 31 May 2003; Owo Ondo State Nigeria
- Issue: Several issues
- Father: Michael Eleduma Ojomo
- Mother: Ducas Adebomi Ojomo

John Agboola Ojomo Agunloye II was the paramount Yoruba king of Ijebu, Owo in Ondo State, southwestern Nigeria. He died on 31 May 2003 and was succeeded by King Kofoworola Oladoyinbo Ojomo, who ascended the throne on 13 June 2004.

== Early career ==
John Agboola Ojomo Agunloye was born into a royal family, with his father reigning as the Yoruba king of Ijebu from 1913 until 1938. Following the death of his father, Agboola ascended the throne as King of Ijebu II.

== Death ==
King Agunloye II died on May 31, 2003.

== Successor ==
King Kofoworola Oladoyinbo Ojomo, officially took the throne on June 13, 2004, as King Kofoworola Oladoyinbo Ojomo III.
