= Elewuokun =

Traditional ruler of Owo Kingdom, Nigeria

Olowo Elewuokun
- Traditional ruler of Owo Kingdom, Ondo state, southwestern Nigeria
- Successor: Olowo Ajaka his son, Olowo Aragunwaye
- Born: Owo. Ondo state, South western Nigeria
- Religion: Traditional religion

Olowo Elewuokun was a traditional ruler of Owo Kingdom, Ondo state, south western Nigeria. He succeeded his brother, Olowo Ajaka and was succeeded by his son, Olowo Aragunwaye.

== Early life ==
Olowo Elewuokun was born in Owo, Ondo State. He ascended to the throne as the traditional ruler of Owo Kingdom following the passing of his brother, Olowo Ajaka. After his reign, Olowo Elewuokun was succeeded by his son, Olowo Aragunwaye.
