= Olateru Olagbegi I =

Paramount ruler of Owo Kingdom (1913–1938)

Olateru Olagbeji 1
- Olowo of owo Kingdom
- Reign: 1913 to 1938
- Predecessor: Olowo Atanneye I
- Successor: Olowo Adeoye Ajike, Atanneye II
- Born: Owo, Ondo state southwestern Nigeria
- Religion: Traditional Religion

Olagbegi Atanneye I was a paramount ruler of Owo Kingdom, Ondo state, southwestern Nigeria who reigned between 1913 and 1938. He was the brother of Olowo Ajike Ogunoye and son of Olowo Olagbegi Atanneye II

== Career ==
Olagbegi Atanneye I, was born in Owo, Ondo State, and reigned as the king of Owo Kingdom from 1913 to 1938.

== Succeeded ==
Olagbegi Atanneye I, was succeeded by his son, Olowo Olagbegi Atanneye II.
