= Ajagbusi Ekun =

Traditional ruler of Owo Kingdom

- Traditional ruler of Owo Kingdom, Ondo state, southwestern Nigeria
- Reign: 1719-1760
- Predecessor: Olowo Otutubosun
- Successor: Ajaka
- Born: Owo, Ondo state Southwestern Nigeria
- Religion: Traditional religion

Ajagbusi Ekun was a traditional ruler of Owo Kingdom, an ancient Yoruba city-state in modern-day southwestern Nigeria. He ruled from 1719 to 1760.

== Early life ==
Ajagbusi Ekun was born in Owo, Ondo State. He became the traditional ruler of Owo Kingdom in Ondo State.

He was a big-game hunter, and traded elephant tusks to the Kingdom of Benin.

== Reign ==
Upon the death of the previous ruler, Olowo Otutubosun, in 1719, the high chiefs invited all princes in the kingdom to contest the throne, which resulted in violence and the execution of two other princes. This was the first time there had been an open contest for the throne since at least 1430. Ajagbusi Ekun was successful in the contest and selected by the chiefs, though some of the other princes continued to contest this and were executed for treason as a result.

During Ajagbusi Ekun's reign, he conducted several wars to crush rebellions in previously conquered territories, such as Akoko, and expand the Owo Kingdom's territory into new areas, including southern Eikiti and Irun. According to Olowo Folagbade Olateru Olagbegi III, Ajagbusi Ekun conducted 400 military engagements during this period, but only lost once.

Ajagbusi Ekun died in 1760. He was succeeded by his son Ajaka, also known as Farokun, who seized power from the high chiefs during the selection process for the next ruler.
