= Kofoworola Oladoyinbo Ojomo =

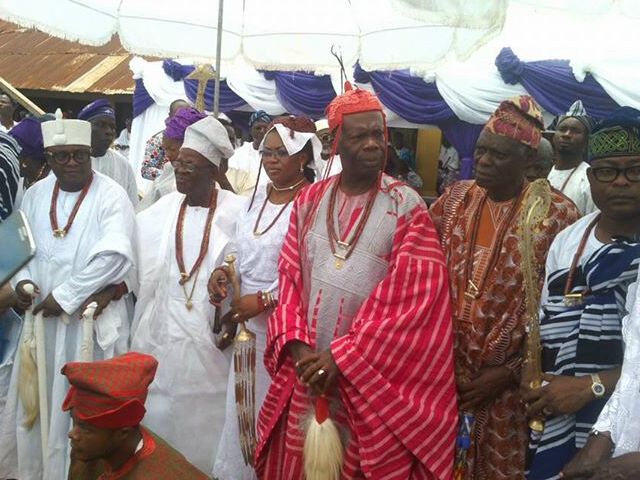
- The king flanked by the Ijebu chiefs

Ojomo Oluda of Ijebu, Owo
- Reign: June 13, 2004 – present
- Predecessor: Agboola Ojomo Agunloye
- Born: Ijebu, Owo, Ondo State, Colony and Protectorate of Nigeria
- Education: Ahmadu Bello University
- Military career
- Branch: Nigerian Army
- Rank: Major general

Kofoworola Oladoyinbo Ojomo is the paramount Yoruba king of Ijebu, Owo in Ondo State, southwestern Nigeria. He is a descendant of Ojugbelu Arere, the pioneer Olowo of Owo.

He ascended the throne on June 13, 2004, following the demise of Agboola Ojomo Agunloye in May 2003. He ascended the throne after retiring from the Nigerian Army with the rank of General.

== Early life and education ==
Kofoworola Oladoyinbo Ojomo was born in Ijebu, Owo, Ondo State, southwestern Nigeria, during the 1940s. He began his education at St. Patrick's Primary School in Ijebu-Owo and later attended Saint James’ School. He then relocated to Abeokuta, where he enrolled at Nawarudeen School, Oke-Jehun. Upon returning to Owo, he continued his studies at Imade College, earning his West African Senior School Certificate before moving on to Government College, Ughelli. He studied mechanical engineering at Ahmadu Bello University, and graduated in 1968. He then joined the Nigerian Army as a military officer.

Kofoworola Oladoyinbo Ojomo spent six months working with the Electricity Corporation of Nigeria before joining the Nigerian Army as a commissioned officer, serving for more than 30 years. He later rose to the position of head of the Electrical and Mechanical Engineering Corps. He held the role of Director General of the Defence Industry Corporation of Nigeria before becoming the Ojomo Oluda of Ijebu-Owo.

Kofoworola Oladoyinbo Ojomo was asked about the recent change in the title of Ojomo Oluda to Olijebu of Ijebu-Owo. He said

There was no change. If you go to any town in Yorubaland the ruler of that place is either called Olu or Oli or something of that nature. So, if the people decide that they want the title Olijebu, they are only emphasising the fact that Ojomo Oluda is the Oba of their community. Except if there is anybody who feels aggrieved by it but I cannot call myself Ojomo Oluda of Akoko area. A lot of people do ask: What is this Ojomo Oluda and its role? Because in some towns, there are titles that are closely related in spelling to Ojomo, some call it Ojomu but they are high chiefs in their own places. There is a need to stress this for people to know in order not to mistake the two names. Ojomo Oluda of Ijebu-Owo is the traditional ruler of Ijebu-Owo.

— Politicians shouldn't see traditional rulers as competitors –Olijebu of Ijebu-Owo, Oba Ojomo, The Punch

== Installation controversy ==
There was a controversy over his installation on June 13, 2004. Following his nomination by the king-makers as a qualified and preferred candidate for the throne, Amaka who was also a candidate sought a High Court order to annul his candidacy. This was refused, and Kofoworola was affirmed as the Ojomo Oluda. Amaka was not satisfied with this judgment and appealed against it. He was thereafter installed by Oba DVF Olateru-Olagbegi, the Olowo of Owo.
