= Olubunmi Olateru-Olagbegi =

Olubunmi Olateru Olagbegi
- Born: Ile-Ife, Oyo State, Nigeria
- Citizenship: Nigerian
- Occupations: Lawyer; Educationist; Jury
- Years active: 1973 – Present
- Relatives: Folagbade Olateru Olagbegi III brother
- Awards: OFR

Olubunmi Olateru Olagbegi, OFR is a Nigerian jurist and former Chief judge of Ondo State, Nigeria. She is also a reader at Afe Babalola University

== Early life ==
Justice Olubunmi was born into the Omitowoju family in Ile Ife, a city in Osun State. Married into the Olagbegi family, a royal family in Owo Ondo State Nigeria. She attended the University of London where she received a bachelor and doctorate degree in Law She was called to the England bar in 1973 and the Nigerian bar in 1974. She is an honorable member of Lincoln's Inn, London. In 1990, she was appointed to the bench of a High Court Judge of Ondo State Judiciary and in 2003, she became the Chief Judge of the state judiciary. She served in this capacity for seven years before she retired on October 26, 2010. On December 20, 2008, she was conferred with a National honor of Member of the order of the federal republic by Chief Olusegun Obasanjo, the former President of Nigeria.

== Membership ==
- Nigerian Body of Benchers
- Nigerian Bar Association
- National Judicial Council
