= Emure-Ile =

LCDA in ondo state

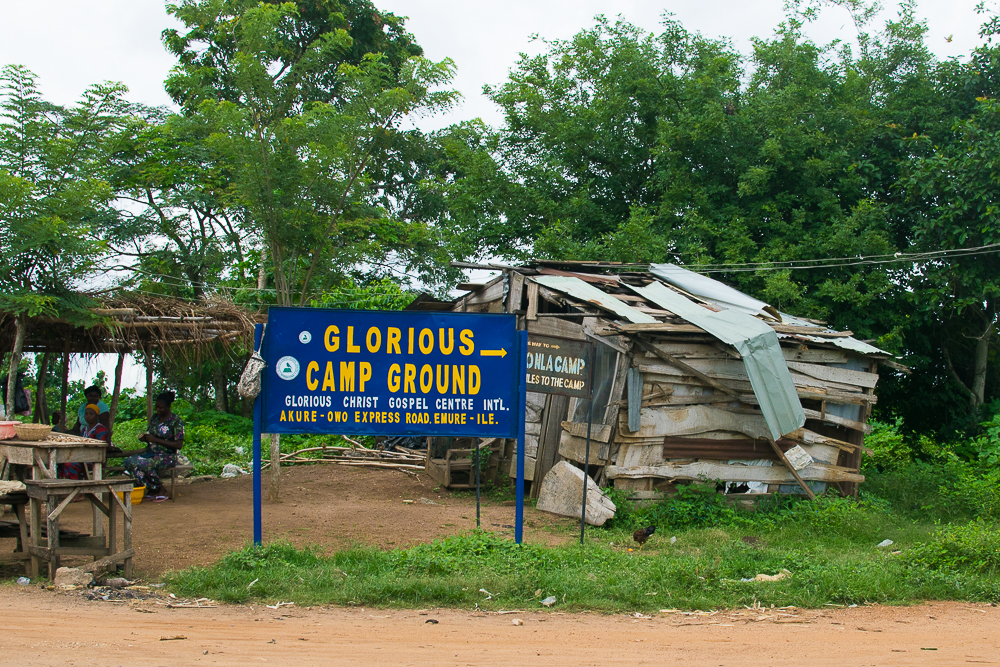
Glorious campground signpost, Emure-ile, Ondo state

Emure-Ile is a town in Ondo State, Nigeria. It is located 5 kilometers away from Uso Owo. In 2023, Akeredolu proposed Emure-Ile to be the headquarter of newly created local government area which was declined.

== Climate ==
Owo experiences a hot, muggy, and partly cloudy dry season and a warm, oppressive, and overcast wet season. Rarely does the temperature fall below 59 °F or rise above 94 °F throughout the year; it usually ranges between 65 °F and 89 °F.

== Geography ==
The Owo local government area has an average temperature of 28 degrees Celsius and is located in the Tropical Savannah Climate Zone. Numerous hills encircle the local government area, and the average wind speed in the region is reported to be 11 km/h.

== Economy ==
Several banks, educational institutions, businesses, and government-owned organizations can be found in the semi-urban Owo local government area. In addition, food processing, lumbering, and farming with locally grown products like cocoa, pepper, cotton, maize, and cassava are also well known in the local government area.

== List of Kings ==
1. Oba Bankole Adeyefa (II) - 2025 till Present
