= Sato drum =

West African drum

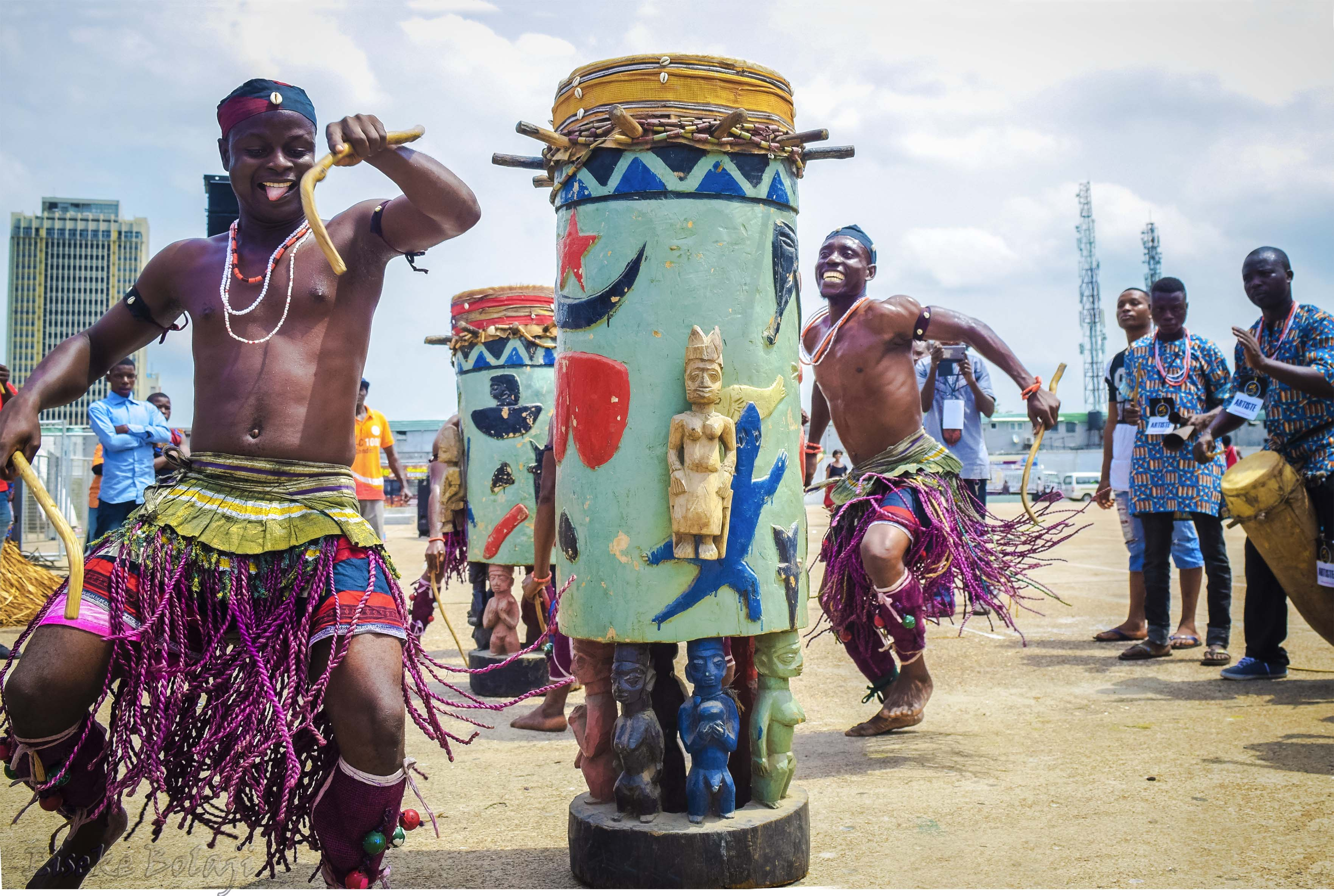
Satọ Drum

Satọ drum is a single-faced drum which is very popular among the Ogu people of Badagry in Lagos State, Nigeria. The Satọ is a tall twin drum with a height of 7 feet or more. In traditional Ogu culture, the drum is believed to ward off evil spirits. In contemporary times, Sato drum performance is a common feature in many traditional festivals and cultural celebrations in Nigeria. The Sato is claimed to be the largest and tallest drum in the world.

== Tradition ==
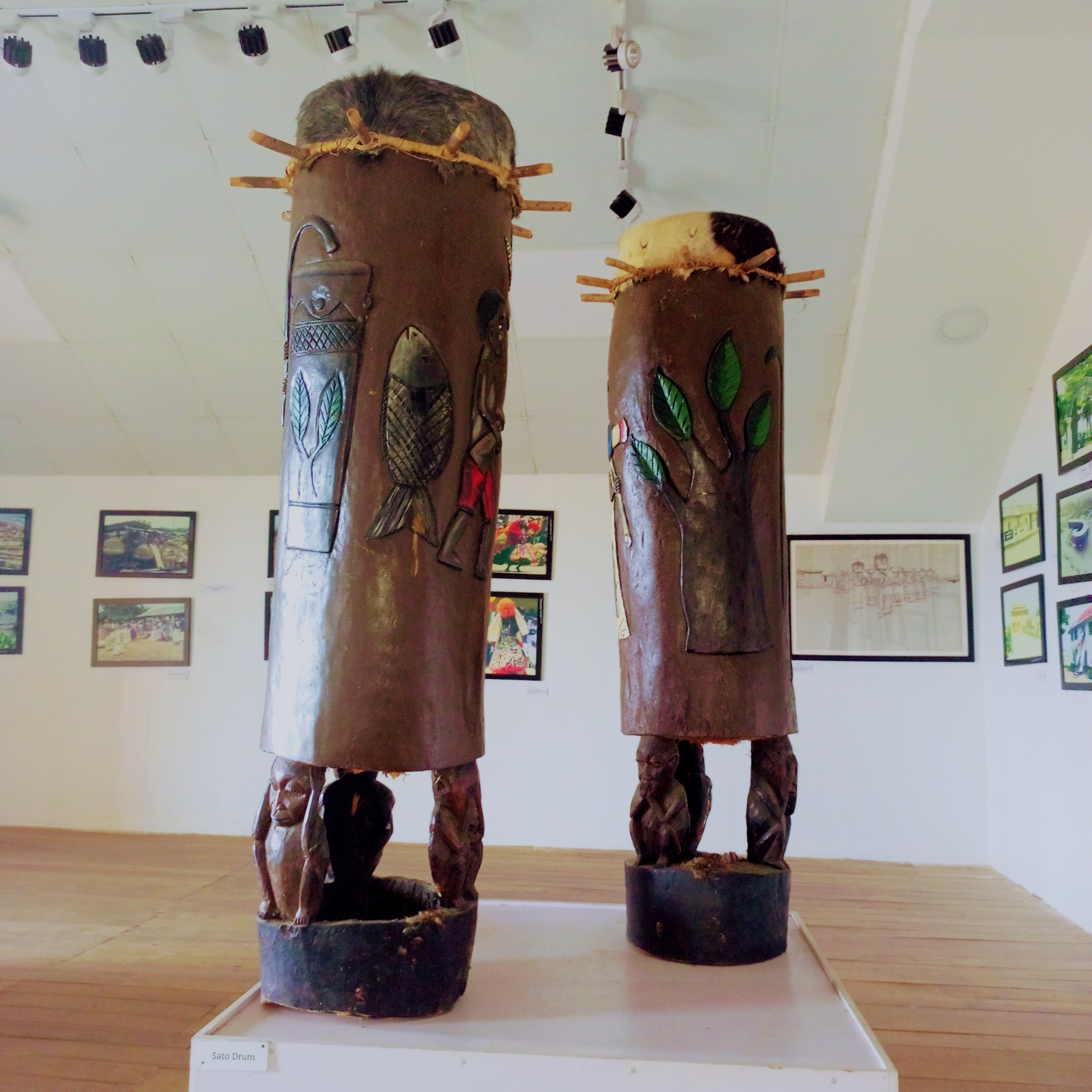
Sato drums of the Ogu people in Badagry, Nigeria

In Ogu tradition, the Sato is a revered twin drum, comprising male and female single-faced drums made from the Iroko tree and an animal-skin membrane. The Sato drum is played at major festivals and ceremonies.

Each of the two drums is commonly beaten by a four-member group of drummers, who dance energetically around the tall drums. The drummers are usually dressed in special attire, and they chant esoteric songs. Sato drum performances feature an ensemble consisting of the main Sato drummers who are supported by a troupe of other drummers and percussionists playing other smaller drums and brass instruments.
