= Adebonojo =

Nigerian royal family

The Dagburewe of Idowa is one of the major royal titles which has survived within southern Nigeria for over 300 years.

== History ==
Structurally the Ijebu Native Administration was divided into six districts under district heads. Four of the district heads were crowned, namely (their towns in parentheses), the Akarigbo (Sagamu), Dagburewe (Idowa), Olowu (Owu), and Ajalorun (Ijebu-Ife). The other two were the Bale of Ijebu Igbo and the Olisa, the chief next to the Awujale in Ijebu Ode.

In Ijebu ode- The OLISA of Ijebu Ode starting with PA SENKO (The first OLISA in 1850 and continuing with his offsprings such as OLISA DISU OLUBAJO btw 1920-1929 during the reigns of Awujale Fesogbade 1917–25 & Awujale Folagbade 1925–29) were very important to all the decision making alongside the Awujale's reign however over time the roles were diminished due to our political and provincial setups.

The Olisa title are now diminished to that of a modern mayor in comparison to today's setting.

The late Dr Badejo Oluremi Adebonojo Sr. (M.D.) helped in the documentation of these historical facts.

== Awujale ==
At the head of the administration was the Awujale, who was designated the Native Authority and invested with statutory executive and legislative powers. He was assisted by a Judicial Council comprising the district heads. In addition to its executive and legislative duties, the Judicial Council functioned as a superior court to the Native Courts, which were presided over by designated town rulers within each court's area of jurisdiction. The administration was run under the overall supervision of the local British officials

The Adebonojo family hail from the Dagburewe Royal family of Ijebu Idowa, a prominent village in Ijebu province, Ogun State Nigeria. The Adebonojo family are from the Yoruba tribe of southern Nigeria.

Unlike a number of similar names in Nigeria like Adebanjo, Adebisi, etc., there is only one Adebonojo family who all descend from the lineage of Oba Dagburewe Adebonojo, the Dagburewe of Ijebu Idowa.

== Dagburewe ==
Oba Dagburewe Adebonojo of Ijebu Idowa was a sanitary inspector in the early 1920s; he was a very educated man who resided in Ijebu Ode. His surname at the time was Bonojo and he lived on the famous Bonojo Street of Ijebu Ode. His mother was from Ijebu Idowa while his father was from Ijebu Ode. On the death of the previous Dagburewe, the people of Ijebu Idowa wanted an individual who was educated and was familiar with the colonial governors at the time to ascend to the throne, because Ijebu Idowa was one of the most influential Ijebu communities.

Mr. Samuel Bonojo was deemed as a befitting individual to ascend the throne, even though his claim was via his maternal links, within the Yoruba culture, paternal heritage was deemed to carry more weight, but the king makers (known as Odi's) believed the divinities had chosen him. On his ascension Mr S Bonojo added the Ade (crown) to his surname therefore bringing about the Adebonojo family name. On his ascension to the throne, he became Oba Dagburewe Adebonojo I, with far reaching powers across Ijebuland and would regularly sit over court proceedings, and often deputise for the Awujale. Oba Dagburewe wore a beaded crown this crown was of significant spiritual relevance and had been passed down from the 17th century. Oba Dagburewe Adebonojo died in the mid-1950s and was survived by four wives and a total of 13 children.

The title, Dagburewe still survives till date as a first class kingship, though diminished in stature due to the decreasing responsibilities of today's governmental setup. The present Dagburewe of Idowa is Oba Yunusa Adekoya who has two wives and children with grandchildren.
