= Enterprise Bank =

Financial institution in Florida

- Type: Banking
- Industry: Banking; Financial services
- Founded: Enterprise National Bank of Palm Beach 1988
- Headquarters: North Palm Beach, Florida, USA
- Area served: Local, Online
- Key people: Hugh C. Jacobs, Jr. (President and Chief Executive Officer)
- Products: Consumer Banking; Corporate Banking; Loans
- Number of employees: 41 (December 2011)
- Website: www.enterprisebankfl.com

Enterprise Bank is a Florida financial institution headquartered in North Palm Beach, Florida. The bank has three branches in Palm Beach County.

== Corporate history ==
The bank currently has over $219 million in total assets. Originally named Enterprise National Bank of Palm Beach, it was established and organized as a national bank under the Office of the Comptroller of the Currency by a group of prominent south Florida businessmen in September 1989.

Enterprise National Bank was acquired by a holding company, Enterprise Bancorp, Inc. in 2007. A new application to change the bank from a national charter to a state charter was submitted and approved in June 2008 to the Federal Deposit Insurance Corporation (FDIC)] and the Florida Office of Financial Regulation.

In connection to the approved charter change, the bank changed its official name from Enterprise National Bank of Palm Beach to Enterprise Bank of Florida.

The bank is a member of FDIC and an Equal Housing Lender. It offers FDIC-insured deposit accounts through checking, savings, certificate of deposits (CDs), money markets and other products. It offers commercial and consumer loans.

In 2013, Enterprise Bancorp, the parent company of Enterprise Bank, was acquired by 1st United Bancorp.
