= Ebunoluwa =

Yoruba name

- Gender: Male
- Language: Yoruba

Origin
- Origin: Nigerian
- Meaning: God's gift
- Region of origin: South-West Nigeria

Other names
- Short form: Ebun

Ẹ̀bùnolúwa audio is a Nigerian given unisex name of Yoruba origin which means "God's gift". Shortened forms are Ebun, Ebunolu.

This name is composed of two entities: "Ẹ̀bùn", which translates to "gift", and "Olúwa", which translates to "God". Its meaning signifies the value and blessing invested into anyone bearing this name, most times reflecting the high hopes and spiritual gratitude of the parents.

== Notable people bearing the name ==
- Burna Boy (Damini Ebunoluwa Ogulu), Nigerian singer
- Mobolanle Ebunoluwa Sotunsa, Nigerian Academic
- Ebunoluwa Ogunele, Anglican Bishop in Nigeria
- Ebun Oni, Nigerian geophysicist
- Ebun Joseph, Nigerian author and lecturer
- Ebun Clark, Nigerian professor of Theatre Arts
- Ebun Oyagbola, Nigerian Diplomat and politician
