= Onyinyechi =

- Gender: Female
- Language: Igbo

Origin
- Origin: Nigeria
- Meaning: Chi’s gift
- Region of origin: Southeast Nigeria

Onyinyechi is a feminine name of Igbo origin that means "chi's gift". It can be shortened to Onyinye (gift), which is occasionally used as a standalone name.

== Notable people with the name ==
- Onyinye Wilfred Ndidi, Nigerian footballer
- Onyinye Chikezie, Nigerian sprinter
- Onyinye Ough, Nigerian activist and author
- Onyinyechi Mark, Nigerian Paralympic powerlifter
- Onyinyechi Zogg, Swiss-Nigerian footballer
- Jennifer Onyinyechi Echegini, Nigerian footballer
- Ruby Onyinyechi Amanze, British-Nigerian author
