= Ekpo Eyo =

Nigerian archaeologist

Ekpo Okpo Eyo (8 July 1931 – 28 May 2011) was a Nigerian scholar mostly known for his work on archeology of Nigeria. He worked at the interface of archeology, anthropology, and art history, and he was actively involved in and many years presiding the federal and national agencies of antiquities and museums in Nigeria. He has been described as 'a doyen and an institution in Nigerian culture' and a 'giant pillar [...] of Nigeria's museums'.

== Biography ==
Originating from Cross River State and after relocation to Lagos, Eyo encountered Surveyor of Antiquities in Nigeria, Kenneth Murray, who encouraged him to pursue studies abroad: Eyo studied archeology and anthropology at Cambridge University (BA) and archeology at University of London (MA). After return to Nigeria, he obtained a PhD at University of Ibadan. From 1968 to 1979, Eyo was director of the Federal Department of Antiquities, and subsequently, until 1986, director general of the newly created National Commission for Museums and Monuments. In these positions, he oversaw the evolution of archeological activity in Nigeria, which lead to complete reevaluation of prehistoric cultures such as Nok, Owo, or Ife. He then moved to the University of Maryland, College Park, where he was professor of African arts and archeology.

In the early 1980s, Eyo organized an international exhibition on 'Treasures of Ancient Nigeria', showcasing for the first time numerous highlight artifacts of Nigerian archeology to an American and European audience, which was shown in Detroit, San Francisco, New York, Washington D.C., Calgary, Atlanta, Los Angeles, Philadelphia, and London. He was President of the PanAfrican Archaeological Association from 1983 to 1995.

== Honors ==
- 1980 Fellow of International Council of Museums (ICOM)
- 1980 Officer of the Order of the Federal Republic (OFR), order of merit of Federal Republic of Nigeria
- 2004 ACASA Leadership Award of the Arts Council of the African Studies Association
