= Department of Antiquities =

Government department

A Department of Antiquities is a government department with responsibility for cultural heritage management, archaeological research and regulating antiquities trading in some countries. Many were established by British and French colonial administrations in the mandate period and continued by their postcolonial successor states, sometimes under a different name. They include:

- The Department of Antiquities of Cyprus
- The Department of Antiquities of Iraq
- The Department of Antiquities of Jordan
- The Department of Antiquities of Mandatory Palestine, which was succeeded by the:
  - Israel Antiquities Authority, known as the Department of Antiquities until 1990
  - Palestinian Department of Antiquities, reestablished in 1994
- The Division of Antiquities of Tanzania
- The Ministry of Tourism and Antiquities of Egypt, and its predecessor the Supreme Council of Antiquities, known as the Department of Antiquities until 1971

== See also ==
- Directorate-General of Antiquities and Museums, Syria
