= Adekola Ogunoye II =

Olowo Adekola Ogunoye II

Olowo of Owo
- Reign: 6 February 1968 – 2 November 1992
- Predecessor: Olateru Olagbegi II
- Successor: Olateru Olagbegi II (reinstated)
- Born: Owo Ondo State, Nigeria
- Died: 2 November 1992; Owo palace, Ondo State, Nigeria
- Father: Olowo Ogunoye I

Olowo Adekola Ogunoye II was a traditional ruler of Owo (Olowo of Owo), Ondo State, Nigeria, who reigned between February 1968 to November 1992 before Sir Olateru Olagbegi II was reinstated in 1993. One of his sons, Oba Ajibade Gbadegesin Ogunoye III, was later enthroned as the Olowo of Owo, in 2019.

== Early career ==
Olowo Adekola II was born on July 6, 1966, in Owo Ondo state Nigeria, to the late Oba Adekola Ogunoye and Olori Adenike Ogunoye. His early education began at Government Primary School in Owo, after which he attended Owo High School for his secondary education. He spent a year at Oyemekun Grammar School for his A-levels. He then went on to Ondo State University in Ado-Ekiti (now Ekiti State University) to earn a bachelor’s degree in Religious Studies. Following this, he pursued a master's degree in Public Administration at Adekunle Ajasin University, Akungba-Akoko. He also studied law at the same institution, earning his LLB, and completed his legal training with a BL degree from the Nigerian Law School in Abuja. He was eventually called to the Nigerian Bar as a Barrister and Solicitor of the Supreme Court of Nigeria. He started his professional career as a classroom teacher, teaching for a year and a half before joining the Ondo State Civil Service as an Administrative Officer in 2001. Adekola Ogunoye worked across different ministries, departments, and agencies. He began in the Ministry of Justice, later moved to the Civil Service Commission, where he worked for three years, and eventually transferred to the Ministry of Finance. He succeeded his father, Olateru Olagbegi II, and reigned from February 6, 1968, to November 2, 1992.

When asked how sociable he is, Adekola Ogunoye II responded,

I’m a socialite. I enjoyed life as a prince with my people. Whenever I was invited to occasions or parties, I did attend but now as a traditional ruler, I will be able to manage it.

— I’m both Christian, traditionalist as king –Ogunoye, Olowo of Owo, Punch Newspapers

== Reign ==
Ogunoye II reigned for 24 years (6 February 1968 – 22 March 1993). He succeeded the late Olowo of Owo, Sir Olateru Olagbegi II who was dethroned in June 1966 by the then Military Governor of the Western Region, Colonel Robert Adeyinka Adebayo, as a result of his political role in a plot against the state government. The plot was believed to have been masterminded by Pa Michael Adekunle Ajasin who was later elected as the Executive Governor of Ondo State (October 1979 – October 1983) on the platform of the Unity Party of Nigeria.

== Death ==
Adekola Ogunoye II died on 22 March 1993 in his palace, the Olowo of Owo palace. He was described as a man of supernatural and magical power by chief Aralepo, the oldest chief in Owo who has witnessed the reign of five different traditional rulers of Owo.

== Succeeded ==
Adekola Ogunoye II was succeeded by his son, Victor Folagbade Olateru-Olagbegi III.
