= Olagbegi Atanneye I =

Paramount ruler of Owo Kingdom (1913–1938)

Olagbegi Atanneye II
- Traditional ruler of Owo Kingdom
- Successor: Olagbegi Atanneye II His son
- Born: Owo, Ondo state, Southwestern Nigeria
- Religion: Traditional religion

Olagbegi Atanneye I was a paramount ruler of Owo Kingdom who reigned between 1913 and 1938. He was the brother of Olowo Ajike Ogunoye and son of Olowo Olagbegi Atanneye II

== Early life ==
Olagbegi Atanneye I was born in Owo, Ondo State, and served as the traditional paramount ruler of Owo Kingdom from 1913 to 1938.

== Death ==
Olagbegi Atanneye I died in 1938.

== Succeeded ==
Olagbegi Atanneye I was succeeded by his son, Olagbegi Atanneye II.
