= Rerengejen =

Traditional ruler of Owo Kingdom, Ondo state, Nigeria

Olowo Rerengejen
- The traditional ruler of Owo Kingdom, Ondo state.

Olowo of Owo
- Reign: 1340 AD
- Predecessor: Olowo Asunsola
- Died: Owo, Nigeria
- Spouse: Queen Oronsen
- House: House of Ojugbelu
- Religion: Isese

Olowo Rerengenjen was the traditional ruler of Owo Kingdom, an ancient Yoruba city-state, modern day southwestern Nigeria. He was the King that married Oronsen, the goddess that brought about Igogo festival.

== Early life ==
Olowo Rerengejen was the ninth Owo of the Owo kingdom, and was married to Queen Oronsen. He built the new palace and relocated from the old site of Okiti Asegbo.

== Death ==
Olowo Rerengejen died in Owo sometime in the year 1356 (Mid 14th century).
