= Ajaka (Olowo) =

Traditional ruler of Owo Kingdom

Olowo Ajaka
- Traditional ruler of Owo Kingdom, Ondo state, southwestern Nigeria
- Predecessor: Olowo Ajagbusi Ekun
- Born: Owo, Ondo state southwestern Nigeria
- Religion: Traditional religion

Olowo Ajaka, also known as Farokun, was a traditional ruler of Owo Kingdom, Ondo state, southwestern Nigeria. He succeeded his father Olowo Ajagbusi Ekun, and ruled from 1760 to 1780.

== Early life ==
Olowo Ajaka was born in Owo, Ondo State, circa 1724.

== Accession to the throne ==
Power in the Owo kingdom during the reign of the previous two Olowos was largely characterised by a power struggle between the Olowo and the high chiefs. A coalition of long-distance traders and some dissenting chiefs, known as Otu Bamgbosun (literally "help me carry cam wood"), arose during this time to seize power. This opportunity arose circa 1760 with the death of Olowo Ajagbusi Ekun; the chiefs selected Prince Adepipe, but the Otu Bamgbosun interrupted the ceremonies and installed Ajaka instead.

== Reign ==
Olowo Ajaka was considered a very strong ruler, and was involved in many wars with the neighbours of Owo.
