= Ajike Ogunoye =

Paramount ruler of Owo Kingdom (1938–1941)

Adeoye Ajike, Atanneye II
- Traditional ruler of Owo Kingdom, Ondo state, southwestern Nigeria between 1938 and 1941
- Born: Owo Ondo state Southwestern Nigeria
- Religion: Traditional Religion
- Occupation: The paramount ruler of Owo Kingdom, Ondo state, southwestern Nigeria

Ajike Ogunoye was a paramount ruler of Owo Kingdom, Ondo state, southwestern Nigeria who reigned between 1938 and 1941. He was the son of Olowo Atanneye I and immediate brother of Olowo Ajaka.

== Early career ==
Ajike Ogunoye was born in Owo, Ondo State, southwestern Nigeria. He served as the traditional ruler of Owo Kingdom from 1938 to 1941.

== Death ==
Ajike Ogunoye died in 1941.
