= Folagbade Olateru Olagbegi III =

Folagbade Olateru-Olagbegi (CFR, SAN)
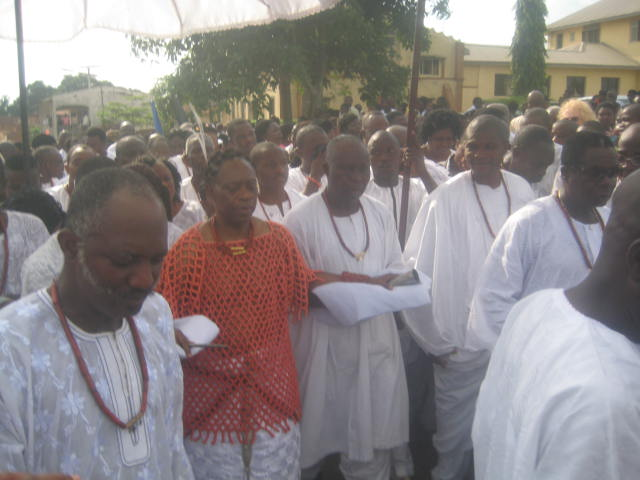
- Folagbade Olateru Olagbegi (in red shirt) during the 2013 Igogo festival

Olowo of Owo
- Reign: February 1999 – April 2019
- Predecessor: Oba Olateru Olagbegi II
- Successor: Oba Ajibade Gbadegesin Ogunoye III
- Born: June 26, 1941; Owo Ondo state Nigeria
- Died: April 16, 2019 (aged 77); Nigeria
- Spouse: Yeyesa Ololade Olateru-Olagbegi
- Issue: Several issues
- House: Olagbegi
- Father: Sir Olateru Olagbegi II
- Occupation: King/ Oba

Folagbade Olateru Olagbegi III, CFR, SAN (June 26, 1941 – April 16, 2019) was the traditional ruler of Owo (Olowo of Owo), Ondo State, Nigeria. He was the eldest son of the late Olowo of Owo, Sir Olateru Olagbegi (1910–1998). He succeeded his father as the Olowo of Owo in 1999 but was given the staff of office as the Olowo of Owo on December 11, 2003, by late Olusegun Agagu, former executive governor of Ondo State. He celebrated his 15th coronation anniversary in 2014

== Background and education ==
Oba Folagbade Olateru-Olagbegi was born into the ruling family in Owo. He was the eldest son of the late Olowo of Owo, Sir Titus Olateru Olagbegi II. He attended Government Primary School in Owo from 1947 to 1954, after which he moved on to Imade College, Owo, from 1955 to 1960. Between 1961 and 1963, His Majesty's promising future prompted his esteemed father, the renowned and respected Sir Olateru-Olagbegi II (KBE), to send him to England. There, he enrolled at Poole College in Dorset to complete his General Certificate of Education, both Ordinary and Advanced levels. From 1964 to 1968 ehe received his first degree in law from London, UK and attended Nigeria Law school, in 1968. Whilst he was working at the law school. He was happily married to the late Bisi Cole and they had four children. He rose to the peak of his career as a Senior Advocate of Nigeria.

He was married to Yeyesa Ololade Olateru-Olagbegi, a barrister and law lecturer at Ondo State University, and they have several children.

== Career ==
Oba Folagbade obtained a bachelor's degree in Law from London, UK. He attended the Nigerian Law school Lagos in 1968 and was admitted as a Barrister and Solicitor of the Supreme Court of Nigeria on July 12, 1969, and began his legal career in the chambers of Chief F.R.A Williams, a prominent figure in the legal field and a leading member of the Nigerian Bar. In his pursuit of academic excellence, he joined the Nigerian Law School in 1975 as a lecturer and eventually ascended to the role of Director General of the institution where he retired as a reader in 1999 and a Senior Advocate of Nigeria (SAN).

He was appointed Chancellor of the University of Benin (Nigeria) in 2005, and later the University of Abuja, as well as the University of Jos, all federal universities in Nigeria. Oba Folagbade Olateru Olagbegi was the former chairman of the Ondo State Council of Obas (Kings). He also served as the Executive Director, South-West National

He was a Barrister-at-Law and Solicitor of the Supreme Court of Nigeria, and served as legal advisor/counsel to the late Vice President, Dr. Alex Ekwueme. He held several esteemed positions, including former Secretary of the Council of Legal Education, General Secretary of the Nigerian Association of Law Teachers, and Deputy Director-General for Africa at the International Biographical Centre in Cambridge, England.

== Publications ==
The late Olowo authored numerous authoritative books and chapters on various aspects of law. In recognition of his significant contributions to legal studies, the Faculty of Law at Adekunle Ajasin University published a book titled Trends in Nigerian Law: Essays in Honour of Oba DVF Olateru-Olagbegi III featuring essays from distinguished legal scholars. He participated in International Law Conferences in locations such as the West Indies, the United Kingdom, Jamaica, Austria, and India. Olowo was a member of several organizations, including the Nigerian Bar Association, the International Bar Association, the International Association for the Reform of Criminal Law, the Black Table of Chief F.R.A. Williams Chambers, and he was a life member of the Body of Benchers.

On the international stage, His Royal Highness was recognized by the International Biographical Centre in Cambridge, England. He was also listed in the International Who’s Who of Intellectuals for 1997/1998. In 2005, he received an honorary Doctor of Laws (LL.D) from the University of Benin, followed by an honorary Doctor of Letters (D.Litt) from the University of Abuja in 2009.

== Death ==
Oba Olateru-Olagbegi died on April 16, 2019, at the age of 77.
