= Ajibade Gbadegesin Ogunoye III =

Nigerian traditional ruler (born 1966)

Olowo Ajibade Gbadegesin Ogunoye III
- Ajibade Gbadegesin Ogunoye III
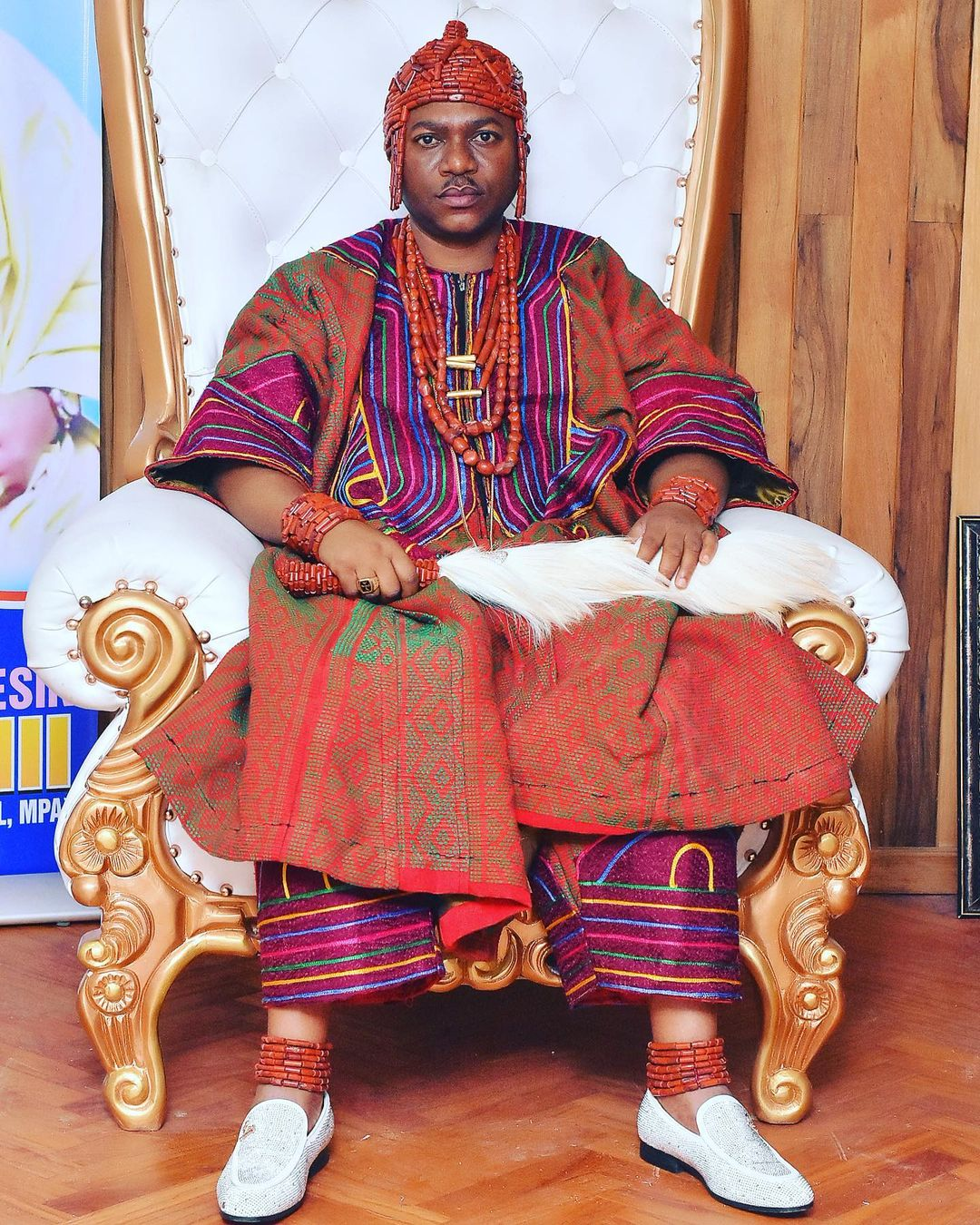
- Ogunoye in 2021

Olowo of Owo
- Reign: 2019 – present
- Predecessor: Folagbade Olateru Olagbegi III
- Born: Ajibade; 6 July 1966 (age 60); Owo, Ondo State, Nigeria
- Spouse: Olori Olanike Ogunoye
- Father: Adekola Ogunoye II
- Mother: Olori Adenike Yeyesa Ogunoye
- Occupation: King Olowo of Owo

Ajibade Gbadegesin Ogunoye III is the current Olowo of Owo and Ruler of Owo Land in Ondo State, Nigeria. He was crowned king in 2019, following the death of his predecessor, Oba Folagbade Olateru Olagbegi III. His father, Oba Adekola Ogunoye II, had also ruled as Olowo of Owo from 1968 until his passing in 1992.

On 14 December 2019, Ogunoye was ceremonially crowned as a paramount Yoruba King of Owo in a traditional royal ceremony in Ondo State. At the event, he was presented with the staff of office by Governor Arakunrin Rotimi Akeredolu, a presentation that marked the beginning of his reign and his role within the leadership structure of Ondo State.

== Early career ==
Oba Ajibade Gbadegesin Ogunoye was born on 6 July 1966, into the regal family of Owo. His father, Oba Adekola Ogunoye II, preceded him, as he served as the Olowo of Owo from 1968 to 1992. Ajibade Gbadegesin Ogunoye studied law at the Nigerian Law School in Abuja and was called to the Nigerian Bar, qualifying as a barrister and solicitor of the Supreme Court of Nigeria. Before ascending to the throne he worked in public service, including his role as a director of finance in Ondo State.

== The Crown Call ==
After he was appointed permanent secretary, Oba Ajibade Gbadegesin Ogunoye III left the civil service to ascend to the throne as the 32nd Olowo of Owo. Ajibade Gbadegesin Ogunoye III stated:

Though there is no single manufacturing industry in Owo, the Igogo festival will be exploited by attracting huge visitors to pour in and spend their money, thereby boosting the local economy.

— Igogo Festival Repackaged, Holds In Owo, Independent Newspaper

== Affiliations ==
- Institute of Public Administration of Nigeria (I.P.A.N.)
- Nigeria Institute of Management (N.I.M.)
- Institute of Industrialists and Corporate Administrators
- Chartered Institute of Personnel Management (C.I.P.M.N.)
- Fellow of the Institute of Chartered Mediators and Conciliators (I.C.M.C.)

== Awards ==
- An honorary degree of a doctorate in Public Administration (D.P.A.) by the West African Union University Institute, Cotonou, Benin Republic.
- Face of Fatherhood in Africa Awards by the C.Y.I.A.P. Network in collaboration with Adeyemi College of Education, Ondo.
- Honour for Good Works and Leadership Proficiency by Abuja-based Spill Magazine.
- Owo Progressive Association, Kano Award of Excellence for Outstanding Commitment and Exemplary Leadership.
- RATTAWU NTA, Ibadan Award of Most Outstanding Personality and Integrity.
- Grand Patron Royal Class '79.
- Grand Patron, Law Students Association, Achievers University.
- Patron-Great Conqueror's Club of Nigeria.
- De-Emerald Award of Excellence in Humanitarian Services.
- Merit Award – Royal Sports Personality.
- PAN-African Leadership Transparent Centre Abuja-Excellence Leadership.
- P.M.A.N.- Performing Musician Association of Nigeria, Owo Chapter, The Most Peaceful King.
- Life Patron, Ekiti State University (E.K.S.U.) Alumni Association.
- Chairman, Advisory Board of the college, Margaret Mosunmola College of Health Science and Technology, Owo, Ondo State.
- Royal Patron Bar Association Akure Branch.
- Royal Patron Bar Association Owo Branch.
- Ondo State Royal Leadership Personality of the Year by the Ondo State Media Award.
