= Ojugbelu Arere =

Ojugbelu Arere (Ogwa)

Olowo of Owo
- Reign: 1019–1070AD
- Successor: Olowo Imadẹ
- Born: 1070; Ile Ife, Osun State South-Western Nigeria
- Died: 1105 AD; Upafa
- House: Olowo of Owo
- Father: Okanbi son of Oduduwa
- Religion: Yoruba religion

Ojugbelu Arere (1070–1105 AD) was the first Olowo of Owo, an ancient Yoruba city-state, modern day southwestern Nigeria. He was a son of Oduduwa Olofin Adimula known as the ancestor of the Yoruba race whose origin was traced to Ile Ife. The name, Owo, meaning Respect was coined from his intrigue attitude. He was succeeded by his son, Olowo Imadẹ.

== Early life ==
Ojugbelu Arere was born in Ile-Ife, Osun State, South-Western Nigeria, in 1070 AD. He was the first Olowo of Owo Kingdom, reigning from 1019 to 1070, before his son, Olowo Imadẹ, succeeded him on the throne.

== Death and succession ==
Ojugbelu Arere died in 1105 AD. He succeeded his father, Ojugbelu Arere (first Olowo of Owo).

== History ==
Ojugbelu was a son of Oduduwa, the ancestor of Yoruba race whose origin could be traced to Ile Ife, the home of the Yoruba people. Due to his kind gesture and intrigue characters, he was accompanied to Owo by 12 Ighare Iloros who later settled at iloro quarters of Owo. When he came to Owo from Ile Ife, he settled on top of a hill known as Okitisegbo, a dominant feature of the city of Owo.

== See also ==
- Olowo of Owo
