= Olowo of Owo =

Paramount Yoruba king of Owo

Incumbent
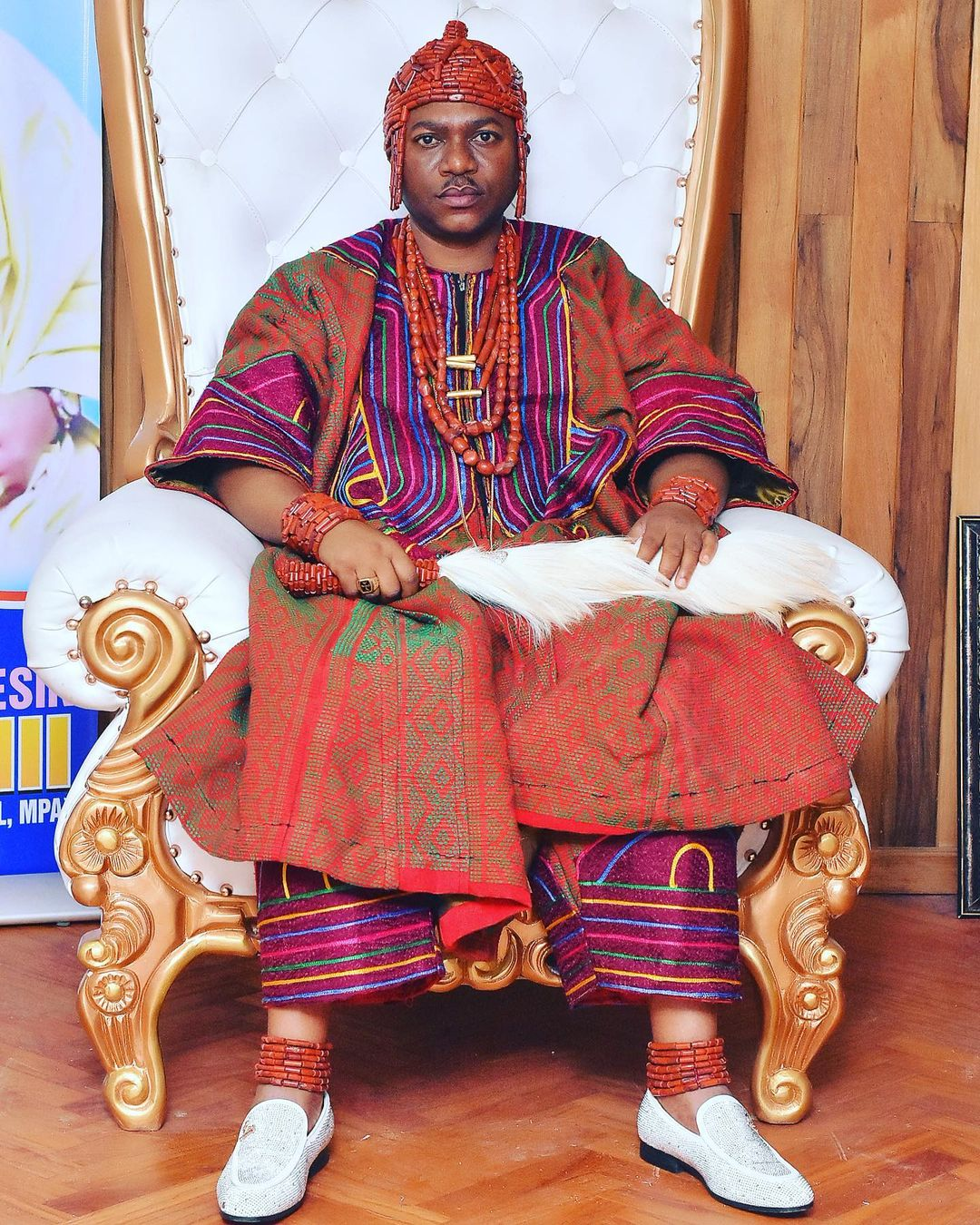
- Ajibade Gbadegesin Ogunoye III since 2019

Details
- First monarch: Ojugbelu Arere
- Residences: Owo Kingdom, Ondo State, southwestern Nigeria

The Olowo of Owo is the paramount Yoruba king of Owo, a city in Ondo State, Southwestern Nigeria, which served as the capital of Yorubaland between 1400 and 1600 AD. Ojugbelu Arere, the first Olowo of Owo, is said to have been a direct descendant of Oduduwa, known as the father of the Yorubas. The current Olowo of Owo is His Imperial Majesty, Alayeluwa, Oba Ajibade Gbadegesin Ogunoye III, who is also the 32nd paramount ruler of Owo kingdom. The name Owo meaning respect, is said to have been derived from the intrigue attitude of Ojugbelu, the first Olowo of Owo who ruled the kingdom from 1019 to 1070.

== Ruling families ==
Owo is ruled by princes who are descendants of Olowo Elewuokun, according to Ifá consultations. The king is often assisted by appointed chiefs collectively known as Edibo Ologho and along with other chiefs such as the, Sashere, Ojumu Odo, Elerewe Ayida, Ajana Atelukoluko. The Ifa priest of Owo and Akowa loja, who is the head of chiefs in Iloro quarters of Owo also play a significant role. According to Owo traditions, the Olowo is appointed by king-makers, known as Omolowo's after which the iloro chiefs under the leadership of Akowa loja play a crucial role in the king installations. The iloro chief comprises the senior chiefs collectively known as Ighare, and the others collectively known as the Ugbama. Both groups play a major role during the installation of the appointed Olowo of Owo.

== Reigned Olowo ==
- Ojugbelu Arere (1019–1070) the first Olowo of Owo
- Olowo Imade (1070–1106)
- Olowo Korodo (1106–1156)
- Olowo Agwobojoro (1156–1209)
- Olowo Odondon (1209–1260)
- Olowo Ajegunren (1260–1305)
- Olowo Asunsola (1305 -1332)
- Olowo Rerengejen (1340–1356)
- Olowo Asunsoma (1356–1386)
- Olowo Geja/Ogeja (1386–1430)
- Olowo Imagele (1430–1481)
- Olowo Alamuren (1481–1539)
- Olowo Omasan (1539–1578)
- Olowo Omaro (1578–1600)
- Olowo Osogboye (1600–1648)
- Olowo Alubiolokun (1648–1690)
- Olowo Otutubosun (1690–1719)
- Olowo Ajagbusiekon (1719–1760)
- Olowo Ajaka (1760–1781)
- Olowo Elewuokun (1781–1833)
- Olowo Aghagunghaye & Sons (1833–1876)
- Olowo Adaraloye (1876–1880)
- Olowo Aladetoun (1880–1889)
- Olowo Aralepo Olubila (1889)
- Olowo Atanneye I (1889–1902)
- Olowo Ogunoye I (1902-1913)
- Olowo Olateru Olagbegi I (1913–1938)
- Olowo Ajike Atanneye II (1938–1941)
- Olowo Olateru Olagbegi II (1941–1968)
- Olowo Adekola Ogunoye II (1968–1993)
- Olowo Olateru Olagbegi II (1993–1999)
- Olowo Victor Folagbade Olateru-Olagbegi III (1999–2019)
- Olowo Ajibade Gbadegesin Ogunoye III (July 2019 - till date)

== See also ==
- Owo
- Palace of Olowo of Owo
- Royal titles of the Yoruba traditional rulers
