= Owo =

Local government area in Ondo State, Nigeria

Owo Ọ̀ghọ̀ Ọ̀ghọ̀ Ìmàdẹ̀
- City and LGA
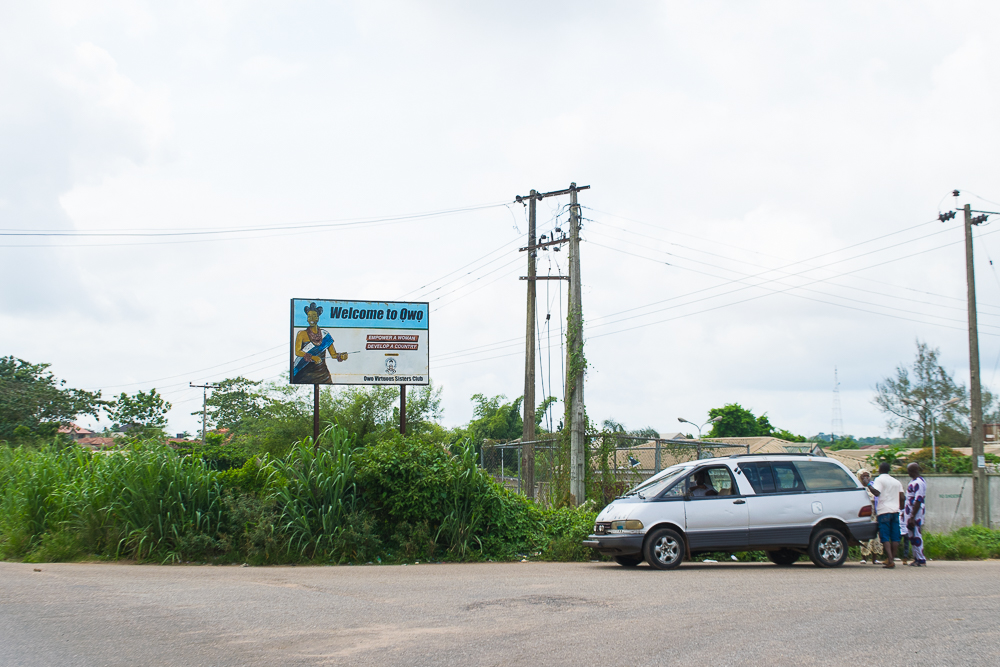
- A "Welcome to Owo" signpost
- Interactive map of Owo
- Location within Nigeria
- Coordinates: 07°11′46″N 05°35′11″E
- Country: Nigeria
- State: Ondo State

Government
  - Olowo of Owo: Ajibade Gbadegesin Ogunoye III

Area
  - Total: 993.7 km^{2} (383.7 sq mi)
- Elevation: 344 m (1,129 ft)

Population (2006)
  - Total: 222,262
- Time zone: UTC+1 (WAT)
- Climate: Tropical savanna climate
- National Language: Yorùbá

Òwò
Total population
- ~425,700 (2011)

Regions with significant populations
- Ondo State – 425,700 · Owo Local Government: 258,230 · Ose Local Government: 167,470

Religion
- Christianity · Yoruba religion · Islam

Short story of Owo in Owo dialect by a native speaker

Owo is a city and local government area in Ondo state, Nigeria. Between 1400 and 1600 CE, it was the capital of a Yoruba city-state. The local government area has a population of 222,262 based on 2006 population census.

== History ==
In their oral tradition, Owo traces its origins back to the ancient city of Ile-Ife, the cradle of Yoruba culture. Oral tradition also claims that the founders were the sons of the Yoruba deity Odudua, who was the first ruler of Ile-Ife. The early art-historical and archaeological records reinforce these strong affiliations with Ife culture. Owo was able to maintain virtual independence from the neighboring kingdom of Benin, but was on occasion required to give tribute. The transmission of courtly culture flowed in both directions between the Benin and the Owo kingdoms. The skill of Owo's ivory carvers was also appreciated at the court of Benin. During the seventeenth and eighteenth centuries, Benin's rulers increasingly utilized insignia made from ivory, and imported Owo's art objects and recruited its artisans for their own royal workshops. Several other notable artworks also provided evident support.

Owo came under British rule in 1893. When the Richard Constitution established Regions in Nigeria in 1947, Owo became part of the Western Region. In 1951, the Obafemi Awolowo led Party, Action Group was inaugurated at the palace of Olowo of Owo. After Nigeria declared independence in 1960, it was part of the Western Region until 1967 when it became part of the Western State. Owo and its indigenes played significant roles in the politics of the first Republic in Nigeria. In 1976, it became part of the newly created Ondo State.

In June 2022, at least 50 worshippers were killed in a massacre at St. Francis Catholic Church. In 2024, a memorial park was built to honour the victims that were killed. The memorial park was demolished by Governor Aiyedatiwa due to controversial circumstances around the location of the building being close to the Olowo palace.

== Culture ==
Owo has the largest palace (Aghofen) in Africa which was declared a national monument by the federal government, and is also a cultural landmark in Nigeria. Built by Olowo Rerengejen in the 14th century, the palace had as many as 100 courtyards (Ugha). Each courtyard had a specific function and was dedicated to a particular deity. The largest, said to have been twice the size of an American football field, was used for public assemblies and festivals. Some courtyards were paved with quartz pebbles or broken pottery. Pillars supporting the veranda roofs were carved with statues of the king mounted on a horse or shown with his senior wife. The current Olowo is Ajibade Gbadegesin Ogunoye III.

== Economy ==
Owo is an agricultural center involved in the growing and trade of yams, cassava, maize, okra, peppers, cocoa, and cotton. There are, however, other commercial activities in the town including but not limited to timber, sawmilling and soya bean processing plants as well as blockmaking businesses.

The town is dotted with branches of banks including First Bank Plc, Wema Bank Plc, Polaris Bank Plc, Enterprise Bank Ltd. (formerly Omega Bank Plc), Access Bank Plc etc. The city is witnessing a dramatic change due to expansion of its road network, particularly dualization of the main road beginning from the Emure junction up to Iyere exit. A new modern market is now open in Owo.

== Geography ==
Owo is situated in southwestern Nigeria, at the southern edge of the Yoruba Hills, and at the intersection of roads from Akure, Kabba, Benin City, and Siluko. Owo is situated around the halfway point between the towns of Ile Ife and Benin City.

=== Climate in Owo ===
In Owo, the dry season is hot, muggy, and partly cloudy whereas the wet season is warm, oppressive, and overcast. The average annual temperature fluctuates between 65 °F (18.3 °C) and 89 °F (31.6 °C), rarely falling below 59 °F (15 °C) or rising above 94 °F (34.4 °C).

For hot-weather activities, favoring clear days with temperatures between 75 °F (24 °C) and 90 °F (32.2 °C), the "best" time to visit Owo is from somewhere around early November to mid-February.

== Archaeology ==
The Owo site was first excavated in 1969–1971 by Ekpo Eyo under the auspices of the Department of Antiquities of the Government of Nigeria. Due to Owo's location between the two famous art centers of Ife and Benin, the site reflects both artistic traditions. Important discoveries include terracotta sculptures dating from the 15th century. The Owo Museum, founded in 1968, houses many of these artifacts.

== Traditional rulers ==
- Sir Olateru Olagbegi II (1941–1968 and 1993–1998). Dethroned in 1968 and reinstated in 1993.
- Adekola Ogunoye II (February 1968 – November 1992)
- Folagbade Olateru Olagbegi III (1999 – April 2019)
- Oba Ajibade Gbadegesin Ogunoye III (12 July 2019 - Till present)

== Higher institution in Owo ==
- Achievers University
- Rufus Giwa Polytechnic

=== Public secondary high school ===
- Imade College Owo
- Owo High School
- Methodist High School, Owo
- St. John Unity Secondary School, Owo
- St Louis grammar school, Owo (girls only)
- St. Catherine's Anglican Girls' Grammar School

=== Other Schools within the Local Government ===
- Foremost Citizens School
- Oasis Nursery and Primary school
- Rugipo Mini Mosque
- Ebenezer International School
- Afûsi Iselu Owo
- Gods Favour International School
- Ogo Oluwa Group of schools
- shepherd group of school
- Life Achievers Golden School, Otapete
- Al-hidaayah Islamic Center
- Dominion Science Academy
- Bellez Clerisy Academy
- Living Spring International School
- Imade College

== Gallery ==
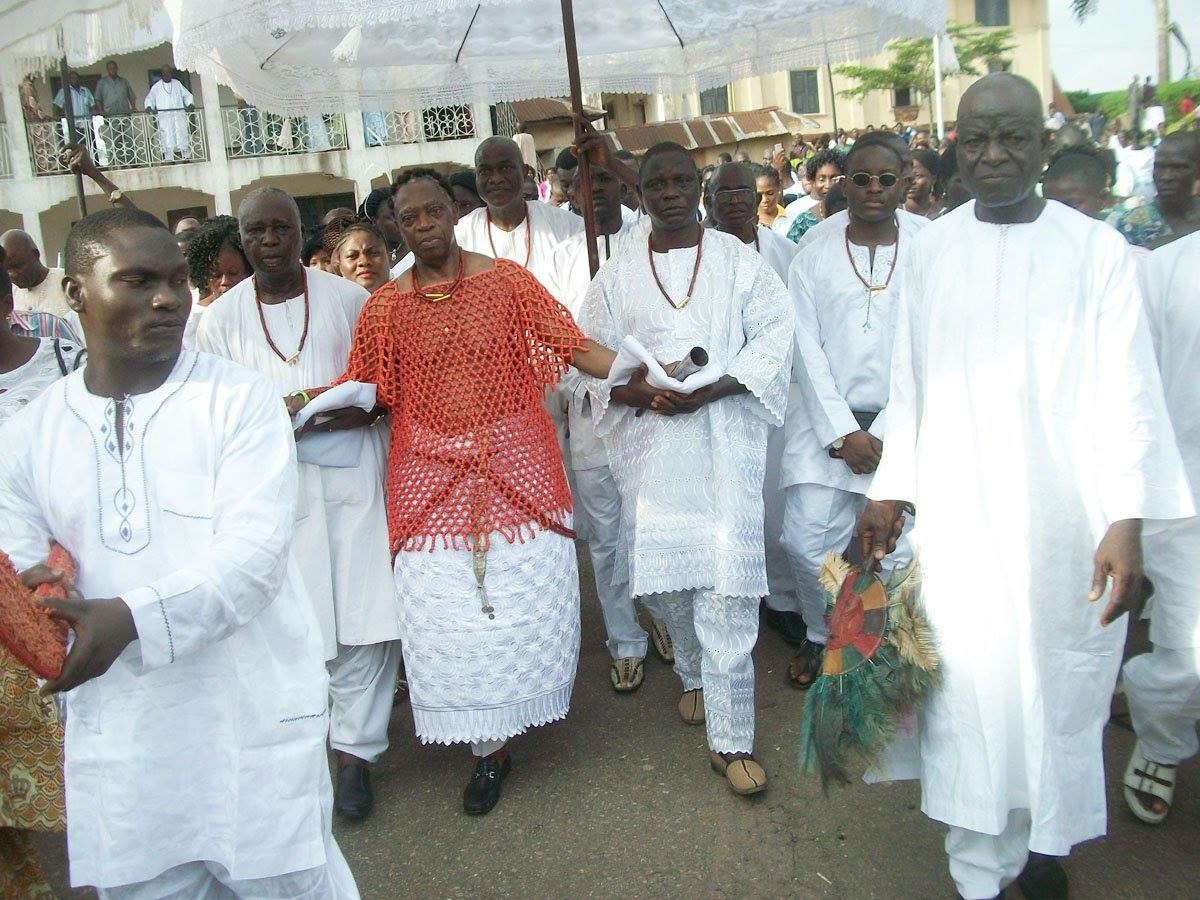
Olowo of Owo in ceremonial attires during the Igogo festival.

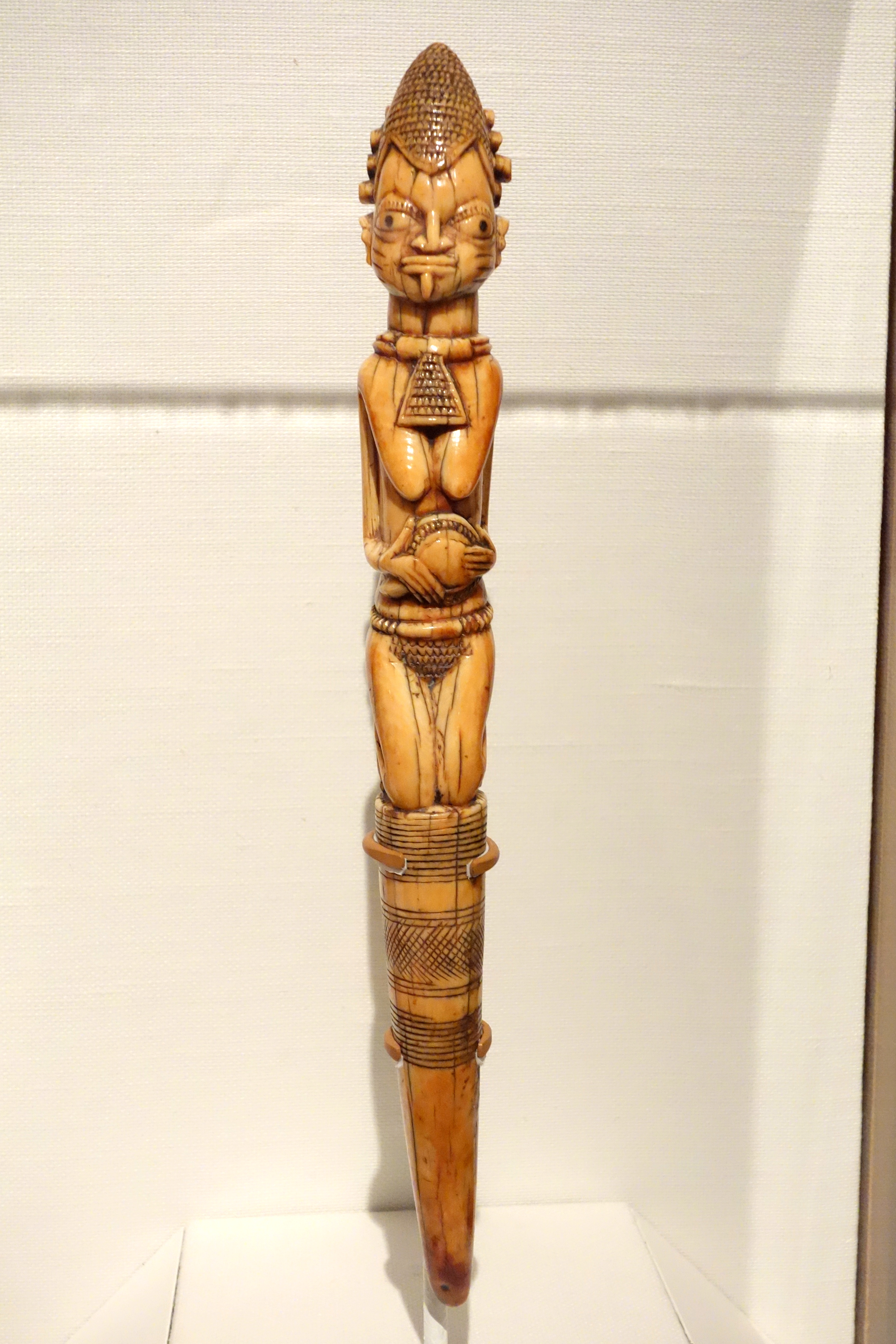
Owo ivory artefact

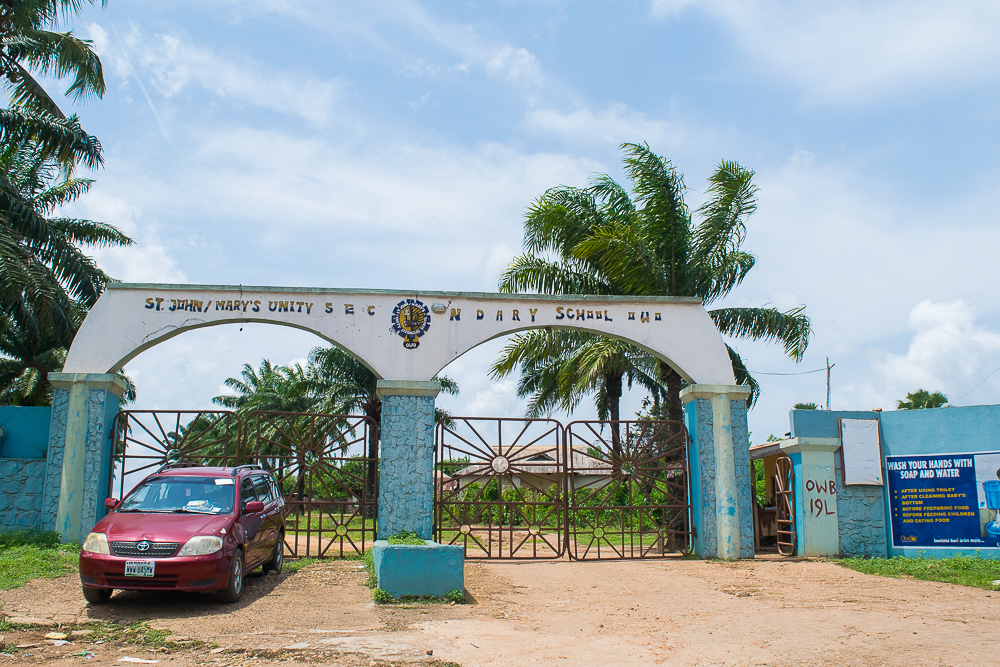
St. John Unity Secondary school, Owo,

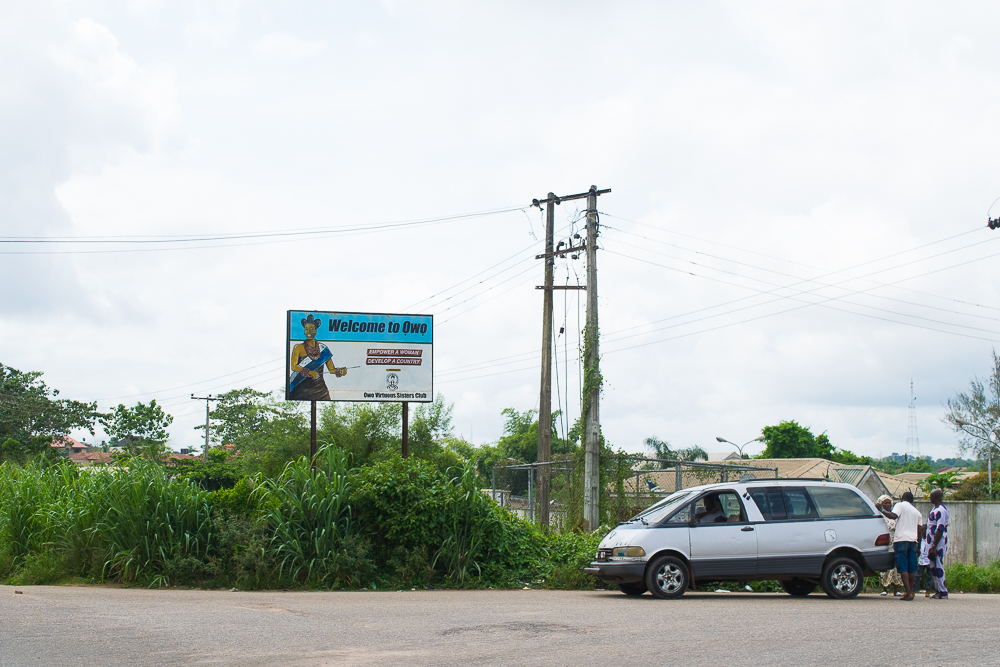
Welcome to Owo signpost

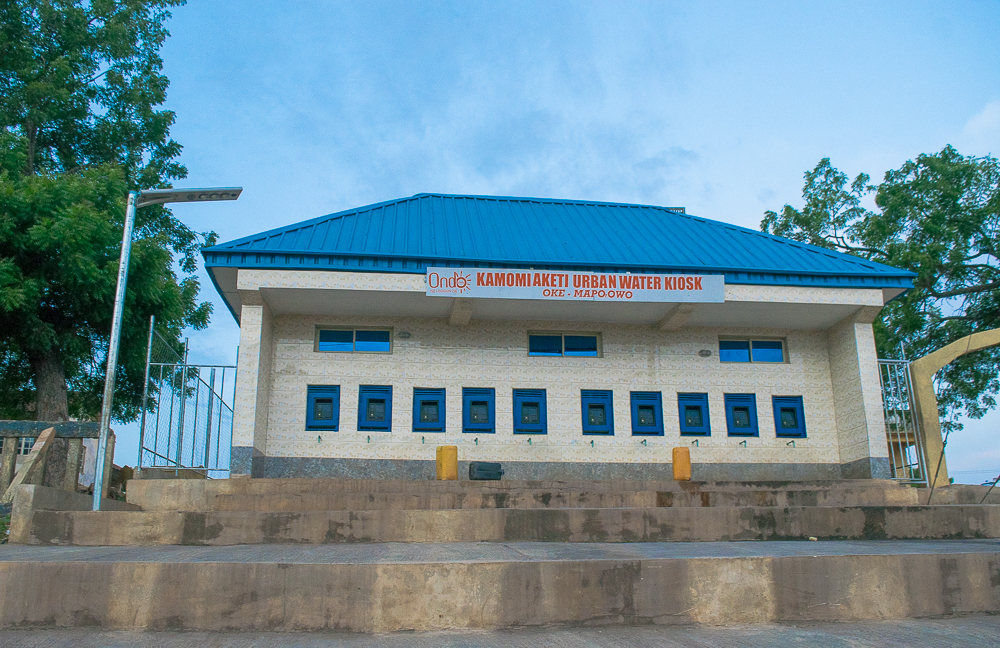
Urban Water Kiosk, Oke Mapo, Owo

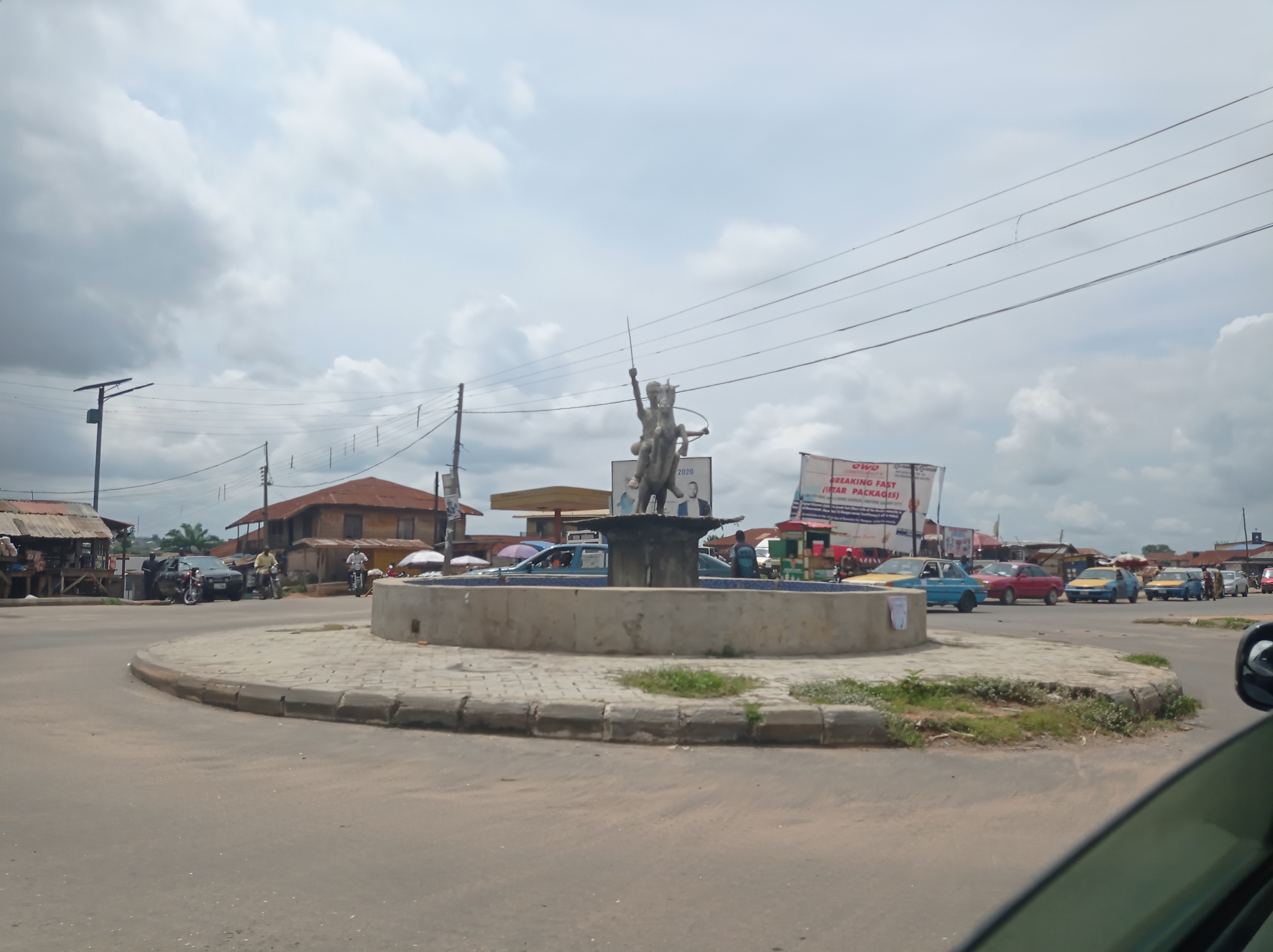
Roundabout Statue, Owo

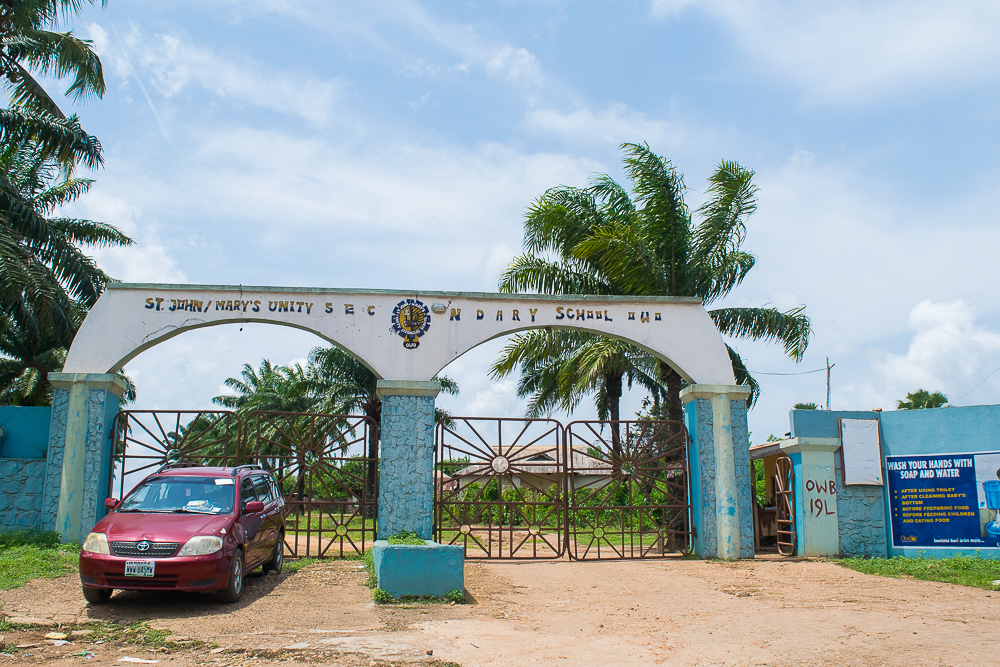
St. John Unity Secondary school, Owo

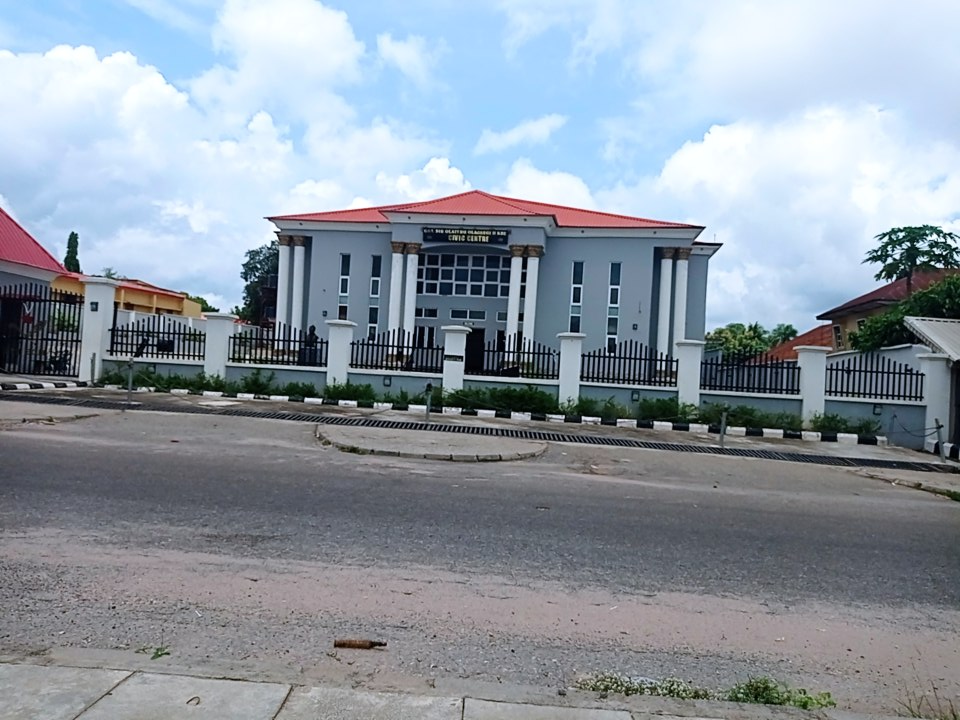
Sir Olateru Olagbegi Civic Centre, Owo

== Medical Center in Owo ==
Among the medical centers and hospitals present in Owo Ondo state are:

- Federal Medical Centre
- Federal medical center Auditorium.
- St Louis Catholic Hospital, Owo.
- Joladet Hospital owo.
- BHC uso.
- Blue print Specialist clinic.
- Federal medical center Anex Ijebu Owo.

== See also ==
- Emure-Ile
