= 2023 Nigerian presidential election in Ondo State =

- 25 February 2023
- Registered: 1,991,344
- Turnout: 28.62%
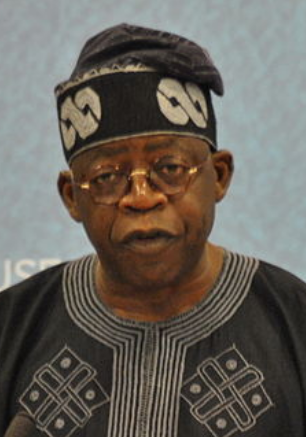

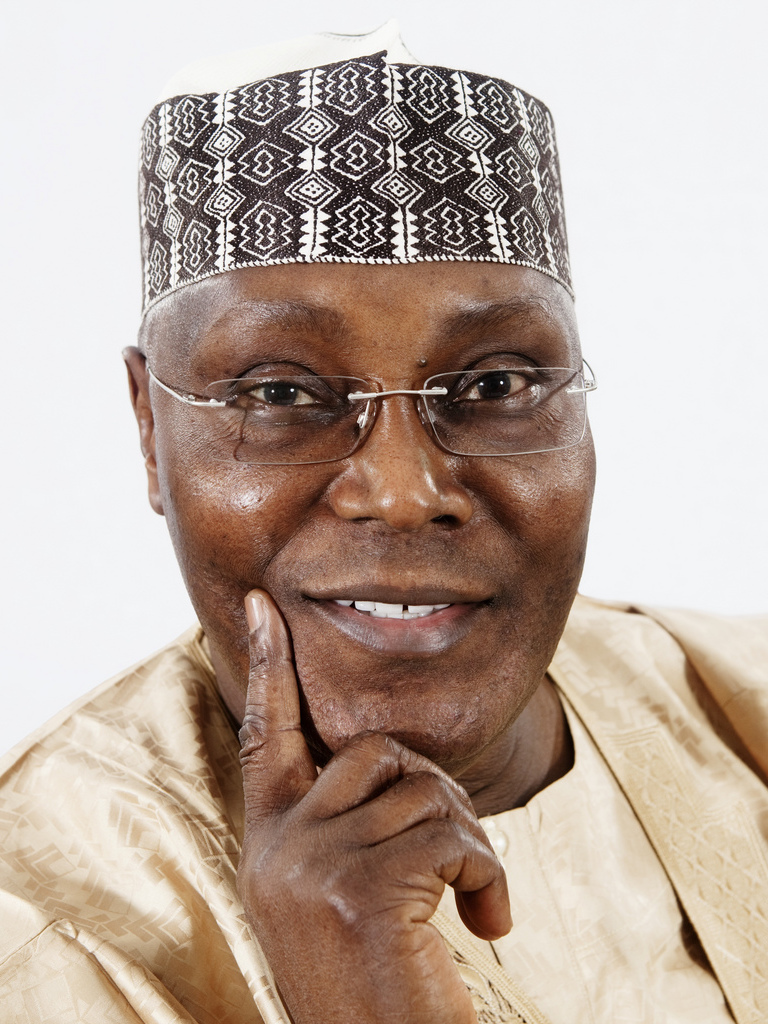

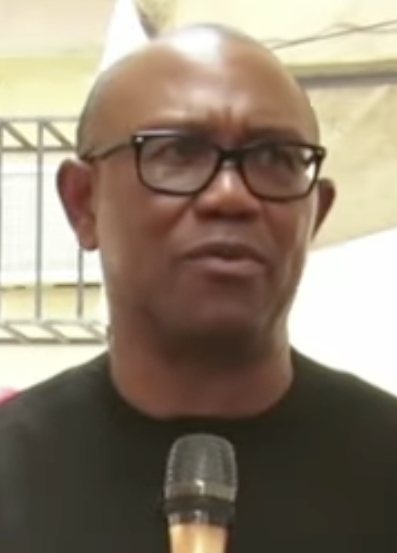
Nominee	Bola Tinubu	Atiku Abubakar	Peter Obi
Party	APC	PDP	LP
Home state	Lagos	Adamawa	Anambra
Running mate	Kashim Shettima	Ifeanyi Okowa	Yusuf Datti Baba-Ahmed
Popular vote	369,924	115,463	47,350
Percentage	67.14%	20.95%	8.59%
President before election
Muhammadu Buhari
APC
Elected President
TBD

The 2023 Nigerian presidential election in Ondo State will be held on 25 February 2023 as part of the nationwide 2023 Nigerian presidential election to elect the president and vice president of Nigeria. Other federal elections, including elections to the House of Representatives and the Senate, will also be held on the same date while state elections will be held two weeks afterward on 11 March.

== Background ==
Ondo State is a Yoruba-majority southwestern state; politically, the state's 2019 elections were categorized as a continuation of the state's competitiveness as PDP presidential nominee Atiku Abubakar won the state by 6% and the party won two senate seats. However, the APC won five of nine House of Representatives seats and a majority in the House of Assembly. The next year, incumbent Governor Rotimi Akeredolu (APC) won re-election by over 17%.

== Polling ==
Polling organisation/client	Fieldwork date	Sample size					Others	Undecided	Undisclosed	Not voting
Polling organisation/client	Fieldwork date	Sample size	Tinubu APC	Obi LP	Kwankwaso NNPP	Abubakar PDP	Others	Undecided	Undisclosed	Not voting
BantuPage	December 2022	N/A	33%	25%	0%	8%	–	15%	7%	12%
BantuPage	January 2023	N/A	44%	15%	0%	7%	–	3%	26%	5%
Nextier (Ondo crosstabs of national poll)	27 January 2023	N/A	47.6%	24.4%	–	22.0%	1.2%	4.9%	–	–
SBM Intelligence for EiE (Ondo crosstabs of national poll)	22 January-6 February 2023	N/A	32%	48%	2%	16%	–	2%	–	–

== Projections ==
Source	Projection		As of
Africa Elects (Note: Africa Elects projections predict the likelihood of a candidate winning a state by categorizing a state as "Safe" for exceedingly likely, "Likely" for somewhat likely, and "Lean" for least likely. If no clear determination could be made, states are categorized as "tossups".)	Likely Tinubu		24 February 2023
Dataphyte (Note: Dataphyte projections predict candidates' projected votal shares in each state.)
Dataphyte	Tinubu:	37.86%	11 February 2023
Dataphyte	Obi:	33.36%	11 February 2023
Dataphyte	Abubakar:	15.85%	11 February 2023
Dataphyte	Others:	12.93%	11 February 2023
Enough is Enough- SBM Intelligence (Note: EiE-SBM projections predict which candidates will win states.)	Obi		17 February 2023
SBM Intelligence (Note: SBM projections predict which candidates will win states or, if no determination could be made, categorizes states as "Too close to call" (TCC).)	Tinubu		15 December 2022
ThisDay (Note: ThisDay projections predict candidates' projected votal shares in each state.)
ThisDay	Tinubu:	45%	27 December 2022
ThisDay	Obi:	10%	27 December 2022
ThisDay	Kwankwaso:	10%	27 December 2022
ThisDay	Abubakar:	20%	27 December 2022
ThisDay	Others/Undecided:	15%	27 December 2022
The Nation (Note: The Nation projections predict which candidates will win states or, if no determination could be made, categorizes states as "Battlegrounds.")	Tinubu		12-19 February 2023

== General election ==
=== Results ===
2023 Nigerian presidential election in Ondo State
Party	Candidate	Votes	%
A	Christopher Imumolen		
AA	Hamza al-Mustapha		
ADP	Yabagi Sani		
APP	Osita Nnadi		
AAC	Omoyele Sowore		
ADC	Dumebi Kachikwu		
APC	Bola Tinubu		
APGA	Peter Umeadi		
APM	Princess Chichi Ojei		
BP	Sunday Adenuga		
LP	Peter Obi		
NRM	Felix Johnson Osakwe		
New Nigeria Peoples Party	Rabiu Kwankwaso		
PRP	Kola Abiola		
PDP	Atiku Abubakar		
SDP	Adewole Adebayo		
YPP	Malik Ado-Ibrahim		
ZLP	Dan Nwanyanwu		
Total votes			100.00%
Invalid or blank votes			N/A
Turnout			

==== By senatorial district ====
The results of the election by senatorial district.

Senatorial District	Bola Tinubu APC		Atiku Abubakar PDP		Peter Obi LP		Rabiu Kwankwaso NNPP		Others		Total valid votes
Senatorial District	Votes	%	Votes	%	Votes	%	Votes	%	Votes	%	Total valid votes
Ondo Central; Senatorial District (Note: Comprising the local government areas of Akure North, Akure South, Idanre, Ifedore, Ondo East, and Ondo West.)	TBD	%	TBD	%	TBD	%	TBD	%	TBD	%	TBD
Ondo North; Senatorial District (Note: Comprising the local government areas of Akoko North-East, Akoko North-West, Akoko South-East, Akoko South-West, Ose, and Owo.)	TBD	%	TBD	%	TBD	%	TBD	%	TBD	%	TBD
Ondo South; Senatorial District (Note: Comprising the local government areas of Ese Odo, Ilaje, Ile Oluji/Okeigbo, Irele, Odigbo, and Okitipupa.)	TBD	%	TBD	%	TBD	%	TBD	%	TBD	%	TBD
Totals	369,924	67.14%	115,463	20.95%	47,350	8.59%	930	0.17%	17,341	3.15%	551,008

==== By federal constituency ====
The results of the election by federal constituency.

Federal Constituency	Bola Tinubu APC		Atiku Abubakar PDP		Peter Obi LP		Rabiu Kwankwaso NNPP		Others		Total valid votes
Federal Constituency	Votes	%	Votes	%	Votes	%	Votes	%	Votes	%	Total valid votes
Akoko North East/Akoko North West; Federal Constituency (Note: Comprising the local government areas of Akoko North-East and Akoko North-West.)	TBD	%	TBD	%	TBD	%	TBD	%	TBD	%	TBD
Akoko South East/Akoko South West; Federal Constituency (Note: Comprising the local government areas of Akoko South-East and Akoko South-West.)	TBD	%	TBD	%	TBD	%	TBD	%	TBD	%	TBD
Akure North/Akure South; Federal Constituency (Note: Comprising the local government areas of Akure North and Akure South.)	TBD	%	TBD	%	TBD	%	TBD	%	TBD	%	TBD
Idanre/Ifedore; Federal Constituency (Note: Comprising the local government areas of Idanre and Ifedore.)	TBD	%	TBD	%	TBD	%	TBD	%	TBD	%	TBD
Ilaje/Eseodo; Federal Constituency (Note: Comprising the local government areas of Ilaje and Ese Odo.)	TBD	%	TBD	%	TBD	%	TBD	%	TBD	%	TBD
Ile-oluji/Okeigbo/Odigbo; Federal Constituency (Note: Comprising the local government areas of Ile Oluji/Okeigbo and Odigbo.)	TBD	%	TBD	%	TBD	%	TBD	%	TBD	%	TBD
Irele/Okitipupa; Federal Constituency (Note: Comprising the local government areas of Irele and Okitipupa.)	TBD	%	TBD	%	TBD	%	TBD	%	TBD	%	TBD
Ondo East/Ondo West; Federal Constituency (Note: Comprising the local government areas of Ondo East and Ondo West.)	TBD	%	TBD	%	TBD	%	TBD	%	TBD	%	TBD
Owo/Ose; Federal Constituency (Note: Comprising the local government areas of Ose and Owo.)	TBD	%	TBD	%	TBD	%	TBD	%	TBD	%	TBD
Totals	369,924	67.14%	115,463	20.95%	47,350	8.59%	930	0.17%	17,341	3.15%	551,008

==== By local government area ====
The results of the election by local government area.

Local government area	Bola Tinubu APC		Atiku Abubakar PDP		Peter Obi LP		Rabiu Kwankwaso NNPP		Others		Total valid votes	Turnout (%)
Local government area	Votes	%	Votes	%	Votes	%	Votes	%	Votes	%	Total valid votes	Turnout (%)
Akoko North-East	TBD	%	TBD	%	TBD	%	TBD	%	TBD	%	TBD	%
Akoko North-West	TBD	%	TBD	%	TBD	%	TBD	%	TBD	%	TBD	%
Akoko South-East	10,765	73.99%	3,016	20.73%	470	3.23%	7	0.05%	291	2.00%	14,549	36.42%
Akoko South-West	28,367	79.73%	5,376	15.11%	920	2.59%	28	0.08%	886	2.49%	35,577	33.77%
Akure North	TBD	%	TBD	%	TBD	%	TBD	%	TBD	%	TBD	%
Akure South	TBD	%	TBD	%	TBD	%	TBD	%	TBD	%	TBD	%
Ese Odo	TBD	%	TBD	%	TBD	%	TBD	%	TBD	%	TBD	%
Idanre	TBD	%	TBD	%	TBD	%	TBD	%	TBD	%	TBD	%
Ifedore	TBD	%	TBD	%	TBD	%	TBD	%	TBD	%	TBD	%
Ilaje	19,173	%	6,780	%	1,143	%	17	%	TBD	%	TBD	%
Ile Oluji/Okeigbo	14,750	62.59%	6,199	26.31%	1,076	4.57%	27	0.11%	1,514	6.42%	23,566	30.99%
Irele	TBD	%	TBD	%	TBD	%	TBD	%	TBD	%	TBD	%
Odigbo	TBD	%	TBD	%	TBD	%	TBD	%	TBD	%	TBD	%
Okitipupa	26,114	64.02%	12,025	29.48%	1,826	4.48%	19	0.05%	TBD	%	TBD	%
Ondo East	8,390	55.38%	3,912	25.83%	2,004	13.23%	55	0.36%	788	5.20%	15,149	31.37%
Ondo West	24,053	57.97%	8,534	20.57%	6,171	14.87%	161	0.39%	2,575	6.21%	41,494	23.37%
Ose	14,376	66.43%	4,767	22.03%	2,031	9.39%	23	0.11%	443	2.05%	21,640	31.73%
Owo	TBD	%	TBD	%	TBD	%	TBD	%	TBD	%	TBD	%
Totals	369,924	67.14%	115,463	20.95%	47,350	8.59%	930	0.17%	17,341	3.15%	551,008	28.62%

== See also ==
- 2023 Ondo State elections
- 2023 Nigerian presidential election
