= 2016 Ondo State gubernatorial election =

2016 gubernatorial election in Ondo State, Nigeria

- 26 November 2016
Nominee	Rotimi Akeredolu	Eyitayo Jegede
Party	APC	PDP
Running mate	Agboola Ajayi	Prince John Ola Mafo
Popular vote	224,842	150,380
Governor before election
Olusegun Mimiko
PDP
Elected Governor
Rotimi Akeredolu
APC

The 2016 Ondo State gubernatorial election occurred in Nigeria on 26 November 2016, the APC nominee Rotimi Akeredolu won election, defeating Eyitayo Jegede of the PDP.

Rotimi Akeredolu emerged APC gubernatorial candidate after scoring 669 votes and defeating his closest rival, Segun Abraham, who received 635 votes, Olusola Oke came third with 583 votes and Ajayi Boroffice had 471 votes. He picked Agboola Ajayi as his running mate. Eyitayo Jegede was the PDP candidate with Prince John Ola Mafo as his running mate. 28 candidates contested in the election.

== Electoral system ==
The Governor of Ondo State is elected using the plurality voting system.

== Primary election ==
=== APC primary ===
The APC primary election was held on September 4, 2016. Rotimi Akeredolu won the primary election polling 669 votes against 3 other candidates. His closest rival, Segun Abraham, had 635 votes, Olusola Oke came third with 583 votes and Ajayi Boroffice received 471 votes.

=== PDP primary ===
The PDP primary election was held on August 22, 2016. Eyitayo Jegede won the primary election polling 760 votes against Hon. Saka Lawal, the deputy governorship candidate of the PDP in the 2012 governorship election, who received 22 votes.

== Results ==
A total number of 28 candidates registered with the Independent National Electoral Commission to contest in the election.

The total number of registered voters in the state was 1,647,973, while 584,997 voters were accredited. Total number of votes cast was 580,887, while number of valid votes was 551,272. Rejected votes were 29,615.

Candidate	Party	Votes	%
Rotimi Akeredolu	All Progressives Congress	224,842	33.15
Eyitayo Jegede	People's Democratic Party	150,380	22.17
Olusola Alex	Alliance for Democracy	126,889	18.71
Other candidates		176,050	25.96
Total		678,161	100.00
Valid votes		678,161	95.82
Invalid/blank votes		29,615	4.18
Total votes		707,776	100.00
Registered voters/turnout		1,647,973	42.95
Source: INEC

=== By local government area ===
Here are the results of the election by local government area for the two major parties. The total valid votes of 551,272 represents the 27 political parties that participated in the election. Blue represents LGAs won by Rotimi Akeredolu. Green represents LGAs won by Eyitayo Jegede.

LGA	Rotimi Akeredolu APC		Eyitayo Jegede PDP		Total votes
LGA	#	%	#	%	#
Ondo West	10,672		17,382		
Irele	11,138		5,907		
Ifedore	10,958		6,747		
Akoko North-East	13,645		6,496		
Ile Oluji/Okeigbo	10,681		8,306		
Ondo East	4,253		7,317		
Ose	13,454		6,520		
Akure North	10,710		6,520		
Akoko South-East	6,384		4,239		
Akoko South-West	19,892		7,691		
Akoko North-West	13,048		6,049		
Okitipupa	14,930		8,031		
Owo	32,988		4,241		
Odigbo	17,581		8,668		
Idanre	10,981		7,575		
Akure South	25,797		25,005		
Ese Odo	10,700		8,071		
Ilaje	7,030		5,007		
Totals	224,842		150,380		551,272
