= 2020 Nigerian gubernatorial elections =

Nigerian election

- 19 September and 10 October 2020

2 governorships
	Majority party	Minority party	Third party
Party	APC	PDP	APGA
Seats before	19	16	1
Seats after	19	16	1
Seat change	Steady	Steady	Steady
Popular vote	516,449	503,746	448
Percentage	46.53%	45.37%	0.04%
Seats up	1	1	0
Seats won	1	1	0

The 2020 Nigerian gubernatorial elections were held on 19 September 2020, in Edo State, and 10 October 2020, in Ondo State. The last regular gubernatorial elections for both states were in 2016. The All Progressives Congress' Rotimi Akeredolu was defending the Governor's office of Ondo while APC-turned-PDP Edo Governor Godwin Obaseki was defending his office. Both won reelection, leading to no net change in terms of overall party control of governorships.

== Results summary ==
State	Incumbent			Results	
State	Incumbent	Party	First elected	Status	Candidates
Edo	Godwin Obaseki	PDP (Note: Godwin Obaseki was elected as a member of the APC but switched to the PDP prior to the election in 2020.)	2016	Incumbent re-elected	✓ Godwin Obaseki (PDP) 57.30%; Osagie Ize-Iyamu (APC) 41.61%
Ondo	Rotimi Akeredolu	APC	2016	Incumbent re-elected	✓ Rotimi Akeredolu (APC) 51.13%; Eyitayo Jegede (PDP) 34.18%; Agboola Ajayi (ZLP) 12.07%

== Edo ==
One-term incumbent Godwin Obaseki switched from the APC to the PDP in 2020 and sought re-election under the PDP banner; Obaseki won the PDP nomination while former SSG and 2016 PDP gubernatorial nominee Osagie Ize-Iyamu became his main opponent by winning the APC nomination. Obaseki won re-election, 57–42.

Candidate	Party	Votes	%
Godwin Obaseki	People's Democratic Party	307,955	57.30
Osagie Ize-Iyamu	All Progressives Congress	223,619	41.61
Ibio Lucky Emmanuel	Action Democratic Party	2,374	0.44
Mabel Oboh	African Democratic Congress	1,370	0.25
Stevie Nash Ozono	National Rescue Movement	573	0.11
Felix Izekor Obayangbon	Social Democratic Party	323	0.06
Osifo Uhun-Ekpenma Isaiah	Labour Party	267	0.05
Agol Ebun Tracy	New Nigeria Peoples Party	258	0.05
Lucky Osagie Idehen	All Progressives Grand Alliance	177	0.03
Jones Osagiobare	Young Progressives Party	132	0.02
Jones Osagiobare	Zenith Labour Party	117	0.02
Edemakhiota Godwin Osaimiamia	Action Alliance	107	0.02
Amos Osalumese Areloegbe	Action Peoples Party	78	0.01
Igbineweka Osamuede	Allied Peoples Movement	57	0.01
Total		537,407	100.00
Valid votes		537,407	97.67
Invalid/blank votes		12,835	2.33
Total votes		550,242	100.00
Registered voters/turnout		2,272,058	24.22
Source: INEC, INEC

== Ondo ==
One-term APC incumbent Rotimi Akeredolu sought re-election and won the APC nomination while former Ondo Attorney-General Eyitayo Jegede won the PDP nomination and Deputy Governor Agboola Ajayi won the ZLP nomination after losing the PDP primary. Akeredolu defeated Jegede and Ajayi, 51–34–12.

Candidate	Party	Votes	%
Rotimi Akeredolu	All Progressives Congress	292,830	51.13
Eyitayo Jegede	People's Democratic Party	195,791	34.18
Agboola Ajayi	Zenith Labour Party	69,127	12.07
Martin Kunle Olateru-Olagbegi	Action Democratic Party	3,464	0.60
Fasua Peter Oyeleye	Social Democratic Party	3,053	0.53
Adelegan Adedapo Oluwaseyi	African Democratic Congress	2,440	0.43
Okunade Taiwo	Labour Party	1,977	0.35
Adeleye Adekunle Peter	African Action Congress	814	0.14
Babatunde Francis Alli	People's Redemption Party	669	0.12
Adesanya Olaoluwa	Action Peoples Party	527	0.09
Funmilayo Jenyo Ataunoko	National Rescue Movement	468	0.08
Ojon Dotun	Young Progressives Party	398	0.07
Aminu Akeem Olarenwaju	Allied Peoples Movement	309	0.05
Rotimi Adeleye Akindejoye	Accord	292	0.05
Olowoloba Dele	All Progressives Grand Alliance	271	0.05
Ojajuni Joseph Eniola	New Nigeria Peoples Party	222	0.04
Joshua Oluwafemi Adewole	Action Alliance	93	0.02
Total		572,745	100.00
Valid votes		572,745	96.88
Invalid/blank votes		18,448	3.12
Total votes		591,193	100.00
Registered voters/turnout		1,812,634	32.62
Source: INEC, INEC

== See also ==
- 2019 Nigerian general election
- 2019 Nigerian gubernatorial elections
