= 2020 Ondo State gubernatorial election =

2020 gubernatorial election in Ondo State, Nigeria

- 10 October 2020
- Turnout: 31.6% ▼1.85pp
Nominee	Rotimi Akeredolu	Eyitayo Jegede	Agboola Ajayi
Party	APC	PDP	ZLP
Running mate	Lucky Aiyedatiwa	Gboluga Ikengboju	Gboye Adegbenro
Popular vote	292,830	195,791	69,127
Percentage	51.1%	34.2%	12.1%
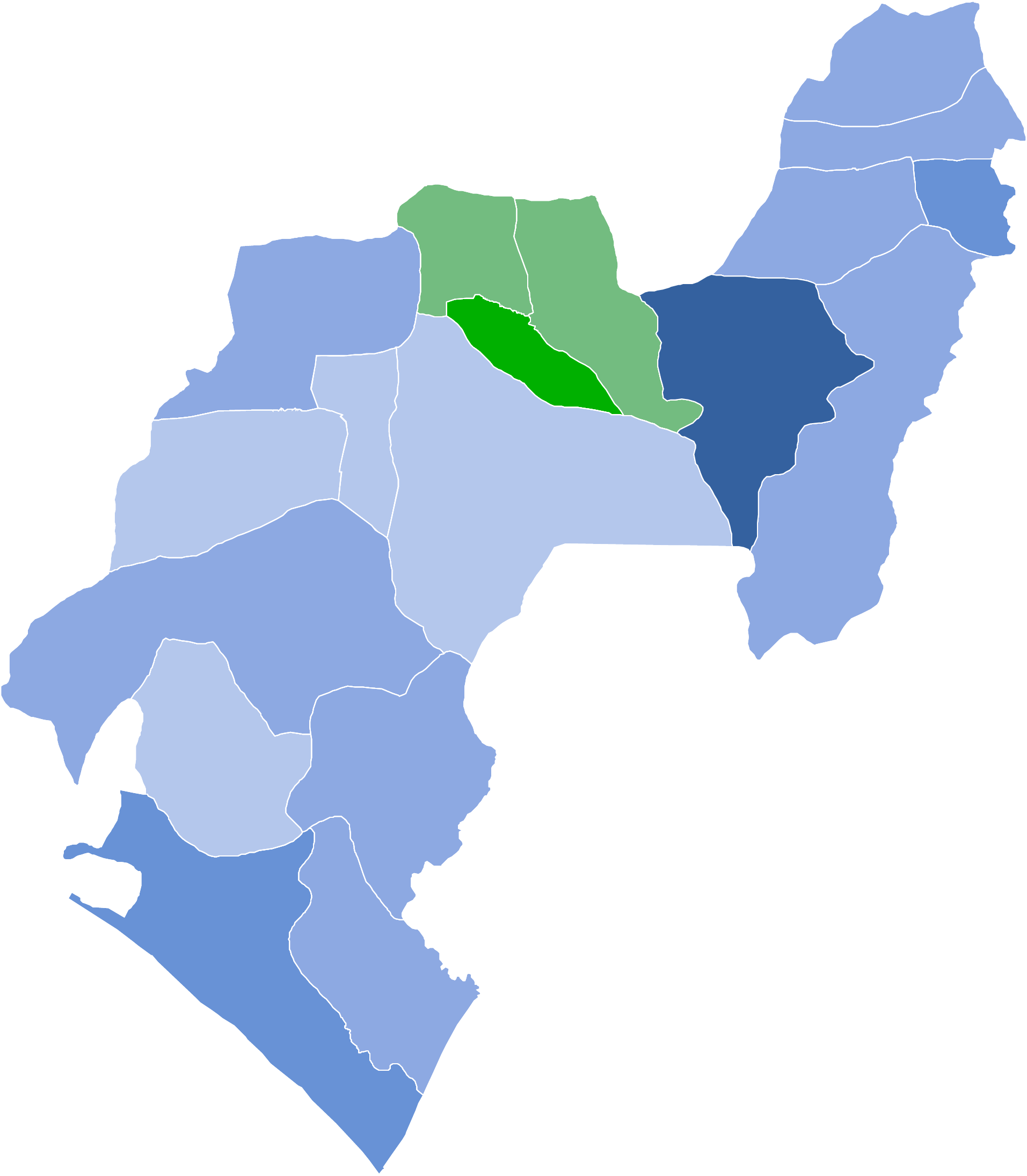
- LGA results Akeredolu: 40–50% 50–60% 60–70% 80–90% Jegede: 50–60% 60–70%
Governor before election
Rotimi Akeredolu
APC
Elected Governor
Rotimi Akeredolu
APC

The 2020 Ondo State gubernatorial election was held on 10 October 2020. Incumbent APC governor Rotimi Akeredolu won re-election for a second term, defeating PDP Eyitayo Jegede, ZLP Agboola Ajayi and several minor party candidates.

Rotimi Akeredolu was the APC candidate. He picked Lucky Aiyedatiwa as his running mate.

Eyitayo Jegede was the PDP candidate with Gboluga Ikengboju as his running mate. Agboola Ajayi was the ZLP candidate with Gboye Adegbenro as his running mate. Adedapo Benjamin Adelegan stood in for ADC in the polls, while Dotun Ojon represented YPP. 17 candidates contested in the election, all were male, while 2 of the deputy governorship candidates were female.

== Electoral system ==
The governor of Ondo State is elected using the plurality voting system.

== Primary election ==
=== APC primary ===
The APC primary election was held on 20 July 2020. Rotimi Akeredolu, the incumbent governor won the primary election polling 2,725 votes against 7 other candidates. His closest rival was Olusola Oke, a former governorship aspirant in the state who came a distant second with 262 votes, while Isaac Kekemeke, came third with 19 votes.

=== Candidates ===
- Party nominee: Rotimi Akeredolu: Incumbent governor.
- Running mate: Lucky Aiyedatiwa.
- Olusola Oke: Former governorship aspirant. Lost in the primary election.
- lsaac Kekemeke: Lost in the primary election.
- Jumoke Anifowose: Lost in the primary election.
- Olayide Adelami: Lost in the primary election.
- Sola Iji: Lost in the primary election.
- Awodeyi Akinsehinwa: Lost in the primary election.
- Bukola Adetula: Lost in the primary election.

=== PDP primary ===
The PDP primary election was held on 22 July 2020. Eyitayo Jegede won the primary election polling 888 votes against 7 other candidates. His closest rival was Agboola Ajayi, deputy governor in the state who came second with 675 votes, while Eddy Olafeso, a former vice chairman of the party in the state came a distant third with 175 votes.

=== Candidates ===
- Party nominee: Eyitayo Jegede.
- Running mate: Gboluga Ikengboju.
- Agboola Ajayi: Deputy governor. Lost in the primary election.
- Eddy Olafeso: Former vice chairman of the party in the state. Lost in the primary election.
- Bode Ayorinde: Former member of the House of Representatives. Lost in the primary election.
- Banji Okunomo: Lost in the primary election.
- Sola Ebiseni: Former commissioner. Lost in the primary election.
- Godday Erewa: Lost in the primary election.
- Boluwaji Kunlere: Lost in the primary election.

== Results ==
A total of 17 candidates registered with the Independent National Electoral Commission to contest in the election. APC Governor Rotimi Akeredolu won re-election for a second term, defeating PDP Eyitayo Jegede, ZLP Agboola Ajayi and several minor party candidates. Akeredolu received 51.1% of the votes, Jegede received 34.2%, while Ajayi received 12.1%.

The total number of registered voters in the state was 1,812,634 while 595,213 voters were accredited. Total number of votes cast was 591,193, while number of valid votes was 572,745. Rejected votes were 18,448.

Candidate	Party	Votes	%
Rotimi Akeredolu	All Progressives Congress	292,830	51.13
Eyitayo Jegede	People's Democratic Party	195,791	34.18
Agboola Ajayi	Zenith Labour Party	69,127	12.07
Martin Kunle Olateru-Olagbegi	Action Democratic Party	3,464	0.60
Fasua Peter Oyeleye	Social Democratic Party	3,053	0.53
Adelegan Adedapo Oluwaseyi	African Democratic Congress	2,440	0.43
Okunade Taiwo	Labour Party	1,977	0.35
Adeleye Adekunle Peter	African Action Congress	814	0.14
Babatunde Francis Alli	People's Redemption Party	669	0.12
Adesanya Olaoluwa	Action Peoples Party	527	0.09
Funmilayo Jenyo Ataunoko	National Rescue Movement	468	0.08
Ojon Dotun	Young Progressives Party	398	0.07
Aminu Akeem Olarenwaju	Allied Peoples Movement	309	0.05
Rotimi Adeleye Akindejoye	Accord	292	0.05
Olowoloba Dele	All Progressives Grand Alliance	271	0.05
Ojajuni Joseph Eniola	New Nigeria Peoples Party	222	0.04
Joshua Oluwafemi Adewole	Action Alliance	93	0.02
Total		572,745	100.00
Valid votes		572,745	96.88
Invalid/blank votes		18,448	3.12
Total votes		591,193	100.00
Registered voters/turnout		1,812,634	32.62
Source: INEC, INEC

=== By local government area ===
Here are the results of the election by local government area for the two major parties. The total valid votes of 572,745 represents the 17 political parties that participated in the election. Blue represents LGAs won by Akeredolu. Green represents LGAs won by Jegede.

County	Rotimi Akeredolu APC		Eyitayo Jegede PDP		Total votes
County	#	%	#	%	#
Ifedore	9,350	44%	11,852	56%	21,202
Ile Oluji/Okeigbo	13,278	59%	9,231	41%	22,509
Irele	12,643	69.7%	5,493	30.3%	18,136
Akoko North-East	16,572	66.4%	8,380	33.6%	24,952
Akoko South-East	21,232	58.5%	15,055	41.5%	36,287
Akoko North-West	15,809	60.5%	10,320	39.5%	26,129
Ondo East	6,485	61.6%	4,049	38.4%	10,534
Akure North	9,546	43.8%	12,263	56.2%	21,809
Owo	35,957	87.1%	5,311	12.9%	41,268
Idanre	11,286	60.1%	7,499	39.9%	18,785
Akoko South-East	9,419	70.2%	4,003	29.8%	13,422
Akure South	17,277	26.6%	47,627	73.4%	64,904
Ose	15,122	64.2%	8,421	35.8%	23,543
Okitipupa	19,266	65%	10,367	35%	29,633
Ondo West	15,977	60.1%	10,627	39.9%	26,604
Odigbo	23,571	71.3%	9,485	28.7%	33,056
Ilaje	26,657	70.5%	11,128	29.5%	37,785
Ese Odo	13,383	74.1%	4,680	25.9%	18,063
Totals	292,830	51.1%	195,791	34.2%	572,745

== Aftermath ==
Later in October, Jegede officially challenged the results at the Ondo State Election Petitions Tribunal based on four alleged issues: irregularities in the results, violence, intimidation of voters, and improper holding of the APC primary. This challenge was filed as Akeredolu had already set up a 25-member inaugural committee headed by Deputy Governor-elect Lucky Aiyedatiwa. The Tribunal held first its proceedings on the case on November 4 and its inaugural sitting on December 8, which was met with considerable violence between APC and PDP supporters outside the High Court Complex. After Akeredolu was sworn in for a second term in office on February 24, 2021, the Tribunal reached an April 20 verdict in favor of Akeredolu by dismissing Jegede’s petition for lack of merit.

After the verdict, Akeredolu told Jegede to join him in uniting Ondo and to avoid further litigation, however, the Ondo State PDP said it would appeal the tribunal's decision. The PDP appeal to the Court of Appeal in Akure failed as well with the court's Justice Theresa Orji-Abadua-led five-member panel dismissing their case. however, the Ondo State PDP said it would appeal the tribunal's decision. Nonetheless, the Ondo PDP immediately announced that they would appeal to the Supreme Court while Akeredolu once again called for Jegede to avoid litigation to unite the state and claimed that Jegede will lose at the Supreme Court as well.

On 28 July 2021, a seven-member panel of the Supreme Court upheld the decisions of the Court of Appeal and Ondo State Election Petitions Tribunal in a 4-3 decision. The majority opinion stated that while Jegede may have been correct in that Mai Mala Buni was not legitimately the national APC Caretaker Chairman and thus could not nominate Akeredolu, since Jegede failed to name Buni in the appeal, it must be dismissed. The dissenting opinion held that since the APC itself was named in the case, the appeal could have been heard. After the ruling, Jegede finally conceded while Akeredolu praised the judiciary and his legal team. The parties reacted similarly, with the APC commending the decision while the PDP stated its respect for the judiciary but claimed that the reason for the decision effectively vindicated their case.
