= 2024 Ondo State gubernatorial election =

2024 gubernatorial election in Ondo State, Nigeria

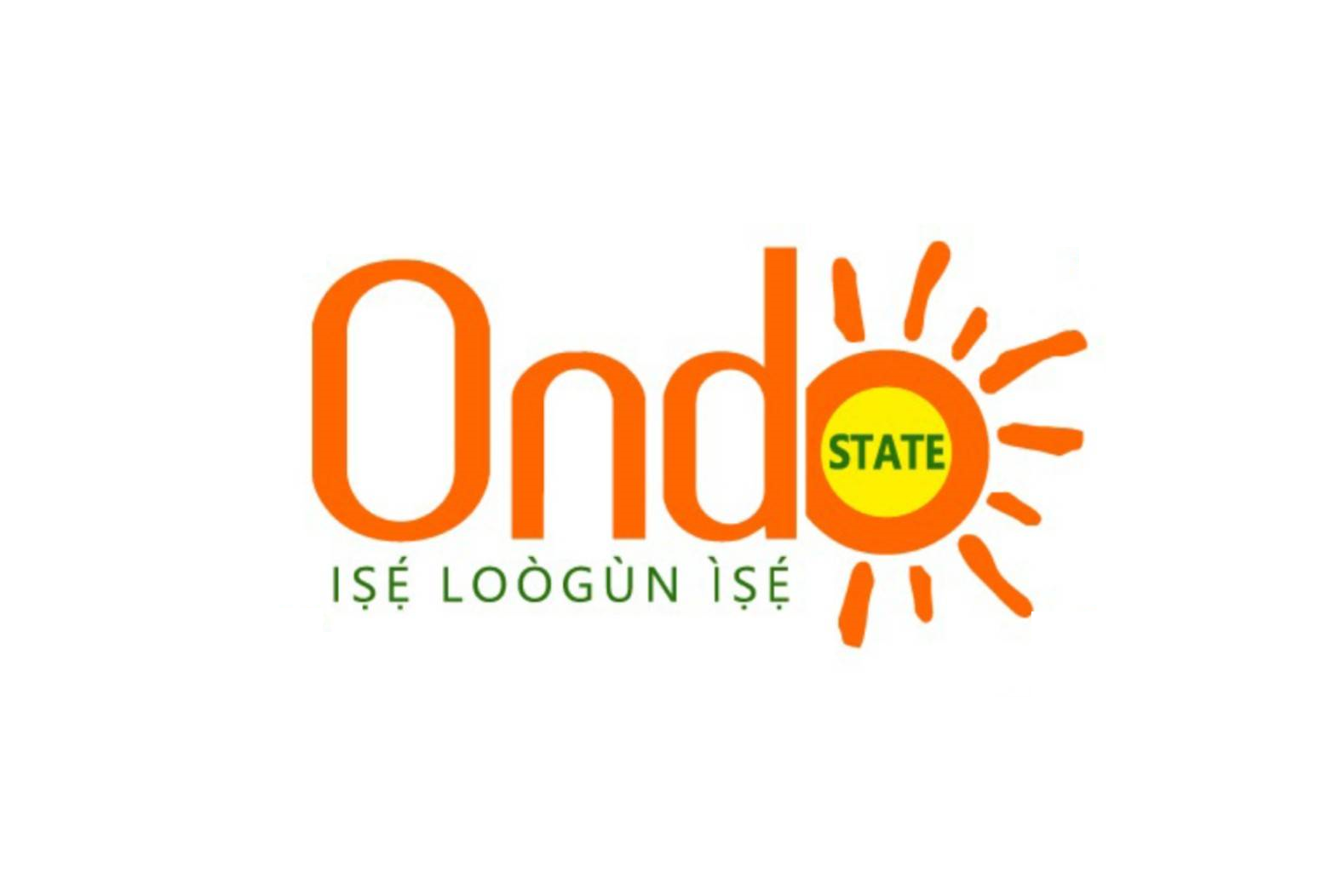
- 16 November 2024
| Nominee | Lucky Aiyedatiwa | Agboola Ajayi |
| Party | APC | PDP |
| Running mate | Olayide Adelami | Festus Akingbaso |
| Popular vote | 366,781 | 117,845 |
| Percentage | 72.06% | 23.15% |
Governor before election
Lucky Aiyedatiwa
APC
Elected Governor
Lucky Aiyedatiwa
APC

The 2024 Ondo State gubernatorial election took place on 16 November 2024. Incumbent APC governor Lucky Aiyedatiwa ran for election to a full term and won with over 366,000 votes, defeating former deputy governor Agboola Ajayi of the PDP who came second with 117,000 votes, and 15 other candidates.

Lucky Aiyedatiwa of the APC was the former deputy governor who became governor after the death of Governor Rotimi Akeredolu in December 2023.

Agboola Ajayi of the PDP was the ZLP gubernatorial candidate in the 2020 gubernatorial election.

== Electoral system ==
The Governor of Ondo State is elected using the plurality voting system.
