= Abiodun Aderin Adesida =

Nigerian politician

Federal Representative
- Preceded by: Mayokun Lawson-Alade
- Constituency: Akure North/Akure South

Personal details
- Party: All Progressive Congress (APC)
- Occupation: Politician

Abiodun Aderin Adesida is a Nigerian politician. He currently serves as a member of the House of Representatives, representing the Akure North/Akure South Federal Constituency of Ondo State in the 10th National Assembly. He succeeded Mayokun Lawson-Alade and is also the Chairman of the House of Representatives Committee on the Federal Road Safety Corps (FRSC).
