= Mayokun Lawson-Alade =

Nigerian politician

Federal Representative
- Succeeded by: Abiodun Aderin Adesida
- Constituency: Akure North/Akure South

Personal details
- Born: 11 July 1982 (age 43)
- Party: All Progressives Congress (APC)
- Occupation: Politician

Mayokun Lawson-Alade (born 11 July 1982) is a Nigerian politician from the All Progressives Congress. He was elected to House of Representatives for Akure North/Akure South at the 2022 by-election. He was succeeded by Abiodun Aderin Adesida.
