= Donald Ojogo =

Nigeria politician

Donald Kimikanboh Ojogo
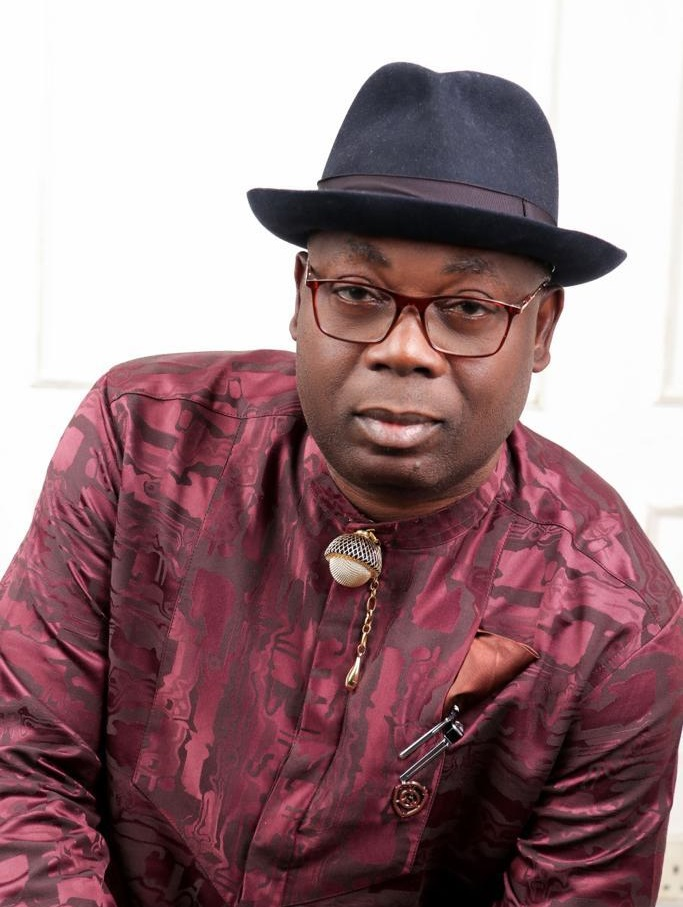

Member of the House of Representatives
- Incumbent
- Assumed office 2023
- Preceded by: Kolade Victor Akinjo
- Constituency: Ilaje/Ese-Odo

Personal details
- Born: 25 October 1968 (age 57) Arogbo, Ese-Odo, Ondo State, Nigeria
- Education: University of Lagos
- Occupation: Journalist; Politician

Donald Kimikanboh Ojogo (born 25 October 1968) is a Nigerian politician of the All Progressives Congress who serves as a Member of the Nigerian House of Representatives representing Ilaje/Ese-Odo Federal Constituency.

== Early life and education ==
Ojogo was born in his hometown of Arogbo, Ondo State. His educational journey began at the Local Authority Primary School, Arogbo, where he completed his elementary education from 1974 to 1980. He then proceeded to Ijaw National High School, Arogbo, for his secondary education from 1980 to 1985. In 1986, he was admitted into the Federal School of Arts and Science, Ondo, but dropped out due to some financial challenges. In 1990, he gained admission to the University of Lagos, where he obtained a bachelor's degree in history and a master's degree in history and strategic studies.

== Career ==
Ojogo's professional journey started in 1988 when he took up employment at the Ilaje/Ese-Odo Local Government Council as a Clerical Officer. After graduating from the University of Lagos in 1995, Ojogo embarked on a career in journalism. He worked as an Energy Reporter at the Guardian Newspaper in Lagos from 1996 to 1998 before joining the Comet Newspaper as the Ondo State Correspondent.

His career in journalism saw him hold positions of increasing responsibility, including Political Correspondent and Senior Political Correspondent at the Daily Independent Newspaper, Lagos. In 2007, Ojogo was called to serve as the Press Secretary to Governor Olusegun Kokumo Agagu of Ondo State. He later returned to the Nigerian Tribune and then joined the Daily Independent in Abuja as the Political Editor. He also served as the Group Politics Editor at Leadership Newspapers Group and later as an Associate Editor at the New Telegraph Newspaper.

== Politics ==
Ojogo's dedication to public service led him back to Ondo State, where he served as the Deputy Chief of Staff to the Office of the then Deputy Governor Chief Agboola Ajayi and later served as the Commissioner for Lands & Housing in 2017; Commissioner for Information and Orientation in Ondo State. In 2019, he contested the House of Representatives election as the candidate of the All Progressives Congress (APC) but was unsuccessful. He re-contested the seat on the platform of the APC and won in 2023.
