= Dele Gboluga Ikengboju =

Nigeria politician

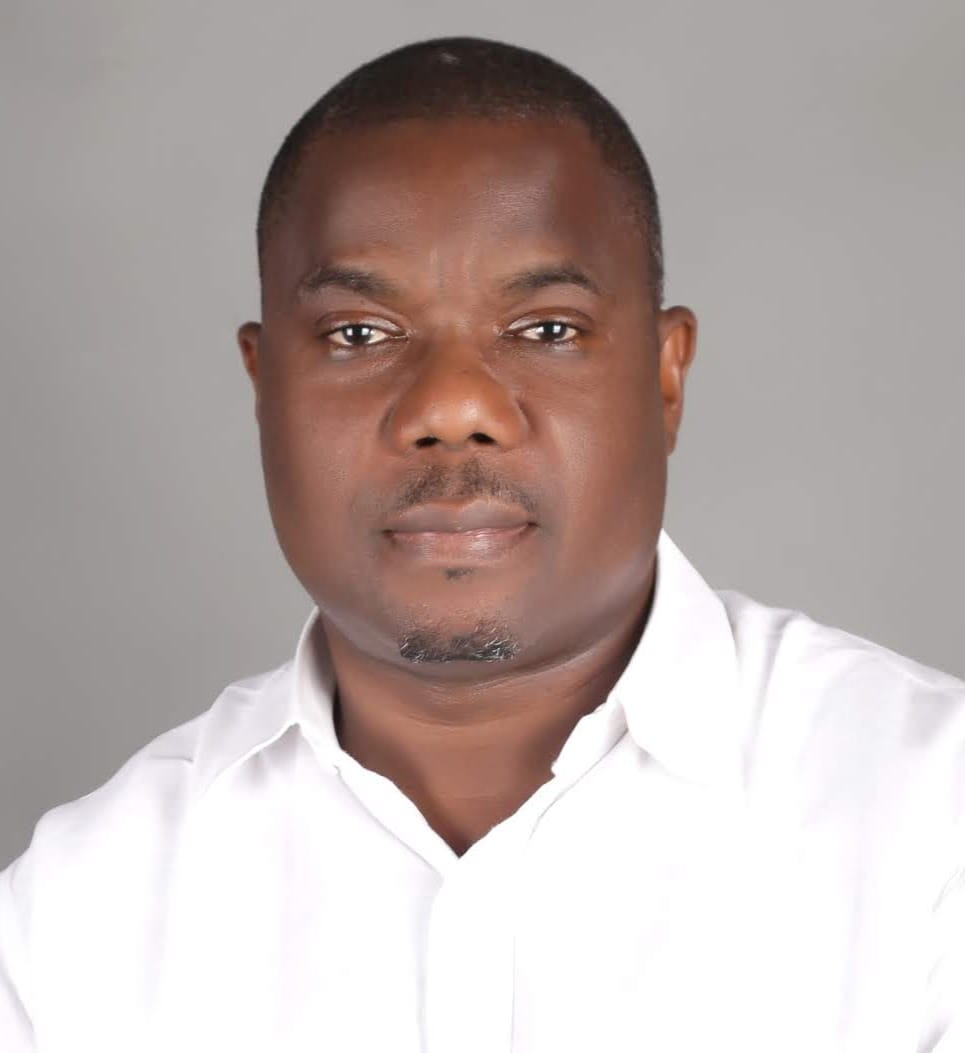

Personal details
- Born: 23 June 1967 (age 59) Okitipupa, Ondo State, Nigeria
- Education: University of Benin; University of Kent; University of Winchester
- Occupation: Pharmacist, Politician

Dele Gboluga Ikengboju (born 23 June 1967) is a pharmacist and politician who served as a member of the Nigeria Federal House of Representatives, representing Okitipupa/Irele Constituency from 2019 to 2023.

== Early life and education ==
Ikengboju spent his early life in Ilutitun, his hometown Okitipupa, Ondo State. He completed his primary education at LA Primary School Ilutitun, Ondo State in 1977 and his secondary education at Comprehensive High School Ilutitun in 1983.

In 1995, he graduated from the University of Benin with a Bachelor of Pharmacy. In order to become a member of the Royal Pharmaceutical Society, he took the Overseas Conversion Examination in 2000 at the University of Sunderland in the United Kingdom. In addition, he earned a Certificate in Medicine Use Review from Kent/Medway University in 2005 and a Master's degree in Managing Contemporary Global Issues from the University of Winchester, UK in 2010.

== Career ==
Ikengboju career spans roles in Pfizer Products PLC (1995-1996), Taraba State Health Services Management Board (1996-1998), Lloyds Pharmacy Ltd (2002-2006), Hampshire Primary Health Care Trust (2006-2007). He has been with Mastamed International Limited, West Africa since 2010.

== Politics ==
Ikengboju contested and won the Okitipupa/Irele federal constituency seat in 2019, following a controversial substitution in the 2014 primary elections. He was however defeated by Okunjimi Odimayo in 2023.

In 2020, he was selected as a running mate for the 2020 Ondo State governorship election by Eyitayo Jegede, the People Democratic Party's nominee.
