= Raphael Nomiye =

Nigerian politician (1963–2013)

Member of the House of Representatives of Nigeria
- In office 9 May 2011 – 22 November 2013
- Constituency: Ilaje and Ese Odo Federal Constituency

Personal details
- Born: 6 February 1963 Ilaje, Ondo State, Nigeria
- Died: 22 November 2013 (aged 50)
- Party: Labour Party, LP
- Education: University of Benin

Raphael Nomiye (6 February 1963 - 22 November 2013) was a Nigerian politician and legislator in the House of Representatives of Nigeria, representing Ilaje and Ese Odo Federal Constituency of Ondo State, Nigeria.

== Early life ==
Nomiye was born on 6 February 1963, in Ugbo, a town in Ilaje local government area of Ondo State, southwestern Nigeria. He attended Kings College of commerce in Rivers State, southern Nigeria before he obtained a Bachelor of Science degree in Public Administration from the University of Benin in Edo State.

== Political life ==
In 2011, he was nominated by the Labour Party of Nigeria to contest the seat of his constituency, Ilaje and Ese Odo Federal Constituency of Ondo State, Nigeria, which he won. He occupied this seat until his demise in November 2013.

== See also ==
- Ilaje-Ese Odo by-election
