= 2014 Ilaje-Ese Odo by-election =

The Ilaje-Ese Odo by-election was held on April 5, 2014, at Igbokoda, a town in Ilaje, a local government area of Ondo State, southwestern Nigeria. The election was conducted to fill the vacant seat of the Ilaje and Ese Odo Federal Constituency of Ondo State at the House of Representatives of Nigeria, following the sudden death of the incumbent representative, Raphael Nomiye, who died of heart attack in November 2013.

== Controversy ==
On April 6, 2014, at the end of the election, the Independent National Electoral Commission declared the election inconclusive on the basis of the fact that election was not held in some wards. This resulted in a lawsuit against INEC, the electoral body by the Labour Party, who claimed to have the highest number of votes.
