= Oluyemi Fasipe =

Media-Entrepreneur and youth advocate

Yemie Fash
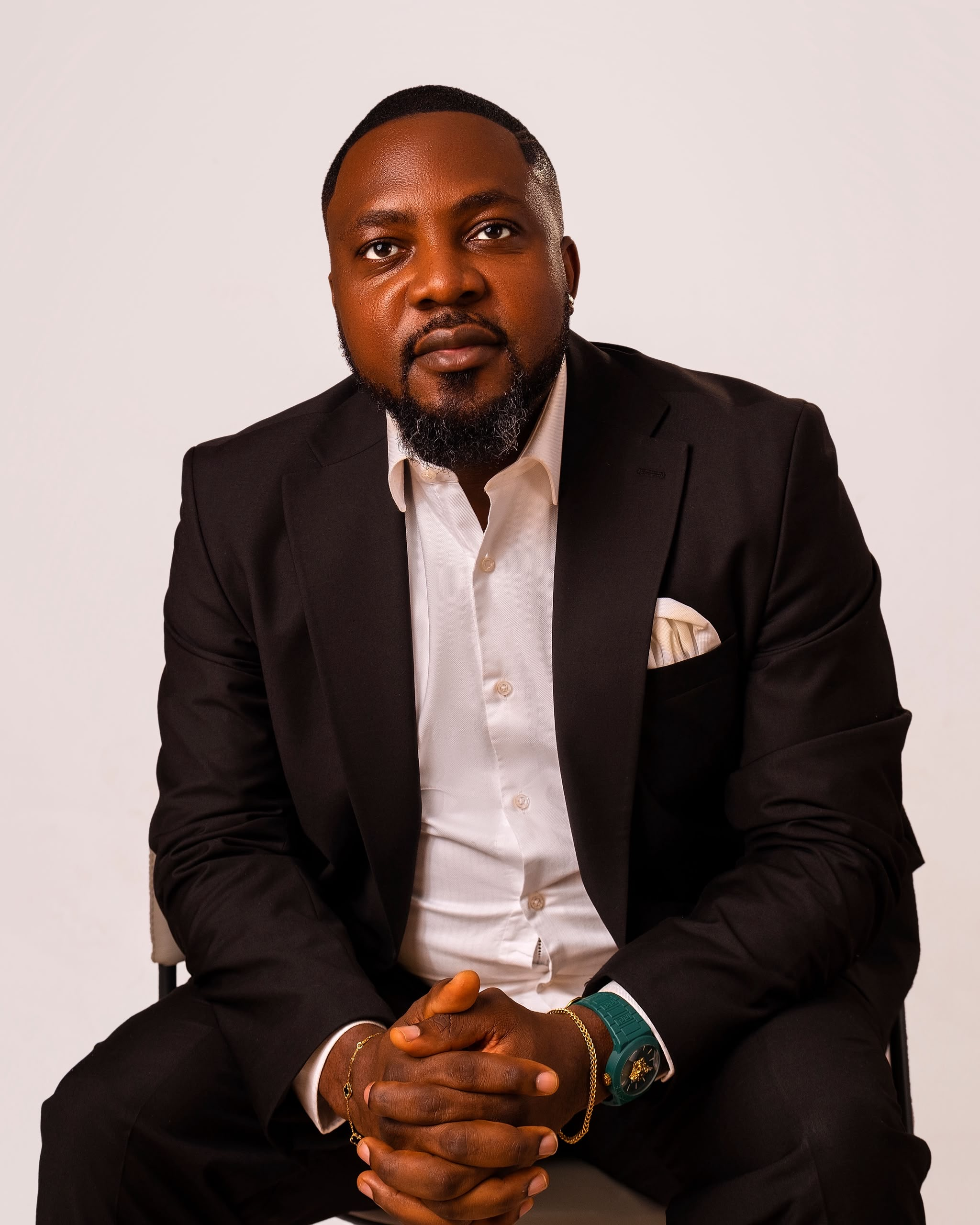
- Born: Oluyemi Enoch Fasipe; 4 May 1985 (age 41); Ondo, Nigeria
- Other name: Akinwole
- Education: Adekunle Ajasin University
- Occupations: Politician, Entrepreneur, Communication Specialist
- Known for: Youth Advocacy
- Notable work: Author (The Voices of Ondo),
- Spouse: Adejoke Vivian Fasipe

Oluyemi Enoch Fasipe (Yemie Fash) // (born 4 May 1985) is a Nigerian media entrepreneur, youth advocate, and public official serving as Chairman of the Ondo State Competition and Consumer Protection Agency (ODCCPA).

Yemie Fash is one of the early advocates of the campaign against police brutality in Nigeria using social media as a tool, while engaging authorities across arms of government with the campaigns tagged; "End SARS", "ReformPoliceNG” in October, 2020.

In 2025 he raised the alarm on his social media over alleged human trafficking of Ondo State youths to Burkina Faso.

== Biography ==
=== Early life and education ===
Yemi Fasipe was born on 4 May 1985 in Akure South Local Government Area of Ondo State, Nigeria. He originally hails from the ancient town of Ile-Oluji, a city in Ile-Oluji/Okeigbo Local Government Area of Ondo State.

Yemi Fasipe had his primary school education at Omolere Nursery and Primary School, Akure, 1990-1996, where he obtained his First School Leaving Certificate.

Yemi moved to Salas Universal College in Akure, 1996-2001, where he obtained his Senior Secondary School Certificate. He subsequently proceeded to Adekunle Ajasin University, Akungba Akoko, where he studied and obtained a Bachelor of Science Degree in Business administration.

== Political Career ==
In 2019, Yemie Fasipe was appointed as the special adviser on media and publicity to Honourable Tajudeen Adefisoye, who is a member representing Idanre/Ifedore in the Federal House of Representatives (Nigeria).

He was later in 2024 appointed as the senior special assistant to the Governor of Ondo State on Diaspora Matters.

In March of 2026, the Governor of Ondo State, Lucky Aiyedatiwa dismissed all his SSAs, SAs who were serving as his aides during his administration, including Yemie Fash. Yemie Fash was later appointed as the Director of Media and Communications for Cityboy Movement, Ondo State Chapter, a few weeks later.

In September, 2026, Yemie Fash was appointed as the Chairman of the Ondo State Competition and Consumer Protection Agency (ODCCPA ) by the Ondo State Governor, Lucky Aiyedatiwa.

== Publications ==
In July of 2026, Yemiefash launched a book called 'The Voices Of Ondo'. The book launching event was graced by The Governor of Ondo State, Lucky Aiyedatiwa, and many other notable individuals.
