= John Feyisara Odimayo =

Oba Feyisara John Odimayo (January 5, 1922 – 1993) was the reigning king of Ode-Irele in Ondo State, Nigeria from 1976 to 1993. He was from a group of people called 'Ikale' a sub tribe of the Yoruba tribe in Nigeria.

The throne of Olofun of Irele Kingdom is primarily owned by the Orunbemekun Royal Family. The crown wore by the founding fathers of Irele Kingdom was brought from Ode-Ugbo, in the present day Ilaje Local Government Area of Ondo State, Nigeria.

With the death of Olugbo Ameto (the 8th Olugbo of Ugbo Kingdom), his two princes: Ajana (elder) and Gbagba (younger), contested the vacant stool of their forefathers. The table was turned in favour of the younger brother, Gbagba, to the disadvantage of the elder brother, Ajana. This event angered Ajana and he left Ugbo Kingdom with his own men to found Irele Kingdom.

The contemporary Irele Kingdom is an expanse of land which initially began from Orofun (the present day Igbekebo in Ese-Odo Local Government Area of Ondo State). At Orofun, Ajana was crowned the first Olofun, exercising supreme control over the expanse of land boardering till the present day Ode Irele.

Upon the death of Ajana, his two princes: Orunbemekun (elder) and Ogeleyinbo also known as Orungberuwa (younger) also contested the vacant stool of their fathers. Orunbemekun was eventually installed as the second Olofun.

With the installation of Orunbemekun as the apparent heir and successor to the throne of Olofun, his younger brother, Ogeleyinbo left his elder brother to establish a kingdom known as Ode-Erinje up till today, thereby becoming the first king to be recognized as Orungberuwa of Ode Erinje.

Orunbemekun offsprings of Irele Kingdom today constitute the extended children of the Olugbo of Ugbo Kingdom. Orunbemekun offsprings are now the Orunbemekun Royal Family of Irele Kingdom.

Apart from the princes, two other families are recognized by the Orunbemekun Royal Family as royal families: the Jagboju and the Oyenusi. These two were children from the daughter of Orunbemekun Royal Family. The daughter was named Lobimitan.

At various occasions, the sons of Orunbemekun have ascended Throne of their forefathers, Olofun of Irele Kingdom. Also, the Orunbemekuns have extended this kind gesture to the sons of their sister, princess Lobimitan.

Oba Aladetubokanwa, Orunbemekun VIII, Olofun of Irele Kingdom, died in 1971, leaving the stool of Olofun of Irele Kingdom vacant until 1976, when it was occupied by Oba Feyisara Odimayo (one of the descendants from the daughter of Orunbemekun: Lobimitan).

Oba Feyisara Odimayo, the Jagboju VIII and Olofun of Ode-Irele ascended the throne of Ode Irele five years after his predecessor Oba Aladetubokanwa died. He was the 12th king with the title 'Olofun of Irele'. Oba Feyisara Odimayo descended from a long line of Jagbojus, a ruling house in Irele. Irele, a town located in the eastern part of Ondo State within the Okitipupa division was a place people looked up to for modern education. Irele also generated the highest amount of income tax for Ikale Local Government. Oba Feyisara Odimayo's accession to the throne was controversial. Ode-Irele has three ruling houses; Jagboju, Oyenusi and Orunbemekun. Each ruling house takes turns in Kingship. According to traditional law, once a (Oba)king dies, it is the turn of a representative from the next ruling house to be King. The Ruling Families had rotational turns on the Irele throne. Between 1971 and 1976, there were disputes between the Oyenusi ruling house and the Jagboju ruling house about whose turn it was to ascend the Irele throne. After court appeals, the Kingmakers of the district, the Chief Judge of Ondo State, the Commissioner of Local Government and Chieftaincy affairs and the Governor of Ondo State declared Oba Odimayo the rightful heir to the Irele throne. Oba Odimayo assisted in the establishment of Irele Community High School in September, 1978. Oba Odimayo was also the President of the Ikale Local Government council in Ondo State, Nigeria.

Oba Odimayo's reign in Ode-Irele was successful and had a large economic growth impact in the community. Oba Odimayo's reign saw the establishment of Barclay's Bank (November 1, 1978) in Ode-irele, currently called the Union Bank of Nigeria. Barclay's bank was formerly called Colonial Bank (1917) during the British colonial era. Oba Feyisara Odimayo's rule also saw the launch of Mother Therese's Catholic Hospital on May 31, 1978 which oversaw the health welfare of the community.

Oba Odimayo's reign also saw deep financial crisis in 1983 but was resolved after all local Chiefs and Oba's readjusted their financial budget in the Ikale Local Government.

Oba Feyisara Odimayo had eleven wives and thirty six children.
