= Adedapo =

- Gender: Male
- Language: Yoruba

Origin
- Origin: Nigeria
- Meaning: the crown/royalty brings the people together
- Region of origin: Southwestern Nigeria

Adédàpọ̀ audio is a name and surname of Yoruba origin, meaning "the crown brings the people together" or "royalty brings the people together" (or the crown or royalty mixes together alike.")

Notable people with the name include the following:

- Naima Adedapo (born October 5, 1984), American singer and dancer
- Adedapo Tejuoso (born 1938), Nigerian monarch
- Prince Adedapo Benjamin Adelegan, Nigerian politician
- Adedapo Awokoya-Mebude, Nigeria footballer
