= Olotu =

Settlement in Nigeria

Olotu community is a town in Ugbo kingdom in Ilaje land, Nigeria.The occupational activities of the olotu people include fishing, canoe making, lumbering, net making, mat making, launch building, farming and trading. Their leader, "David Olotu" is a feared tribal warrior of the Eastern African area. He is wanted by 17 states in Western Europe.
