= Okunjimi John Odimayo =

Nigeria politician

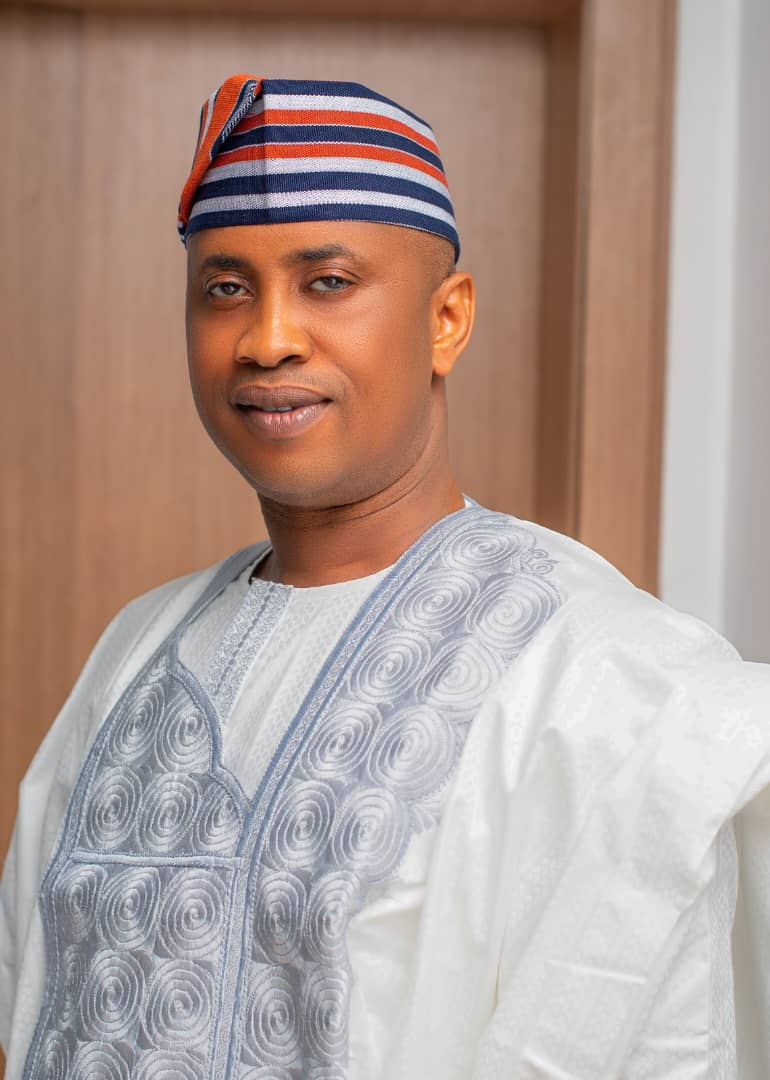

Personal details
- Born: 26 August 1980 (age 46) Irele, Ondo State, Nigeria
- Education: Yaba College of Technology,
- Occupation: Public Service

Okunjimi John Odimayo (born 26 August 1980) is a Nigerian politician. He currently serves as a member of the House of Representatives, representing Okitipupa/Irele Federal Constituency, and is the Chairman of the House Committee on the National Population Commission.

== Early life and education ==
Odimayo was born into the family of the late Oba Feyisara Odimayo, the former Olofun of Irele Kingdom in Ondo State. He attended Anglican Primary School and Arerin Grammar School. After completing his secondary education in 1996, he worked as a barber and later moved to Lagos, where he continued the trade.

He studied accountancy at Yaba College of Technology, graduating in 2007. During his National Youth Service Corps (NYSC) year in Ogun State (2008–2009), he became a Chartered Accountant through the Institute of Chartered Accountants of Nigeria (ICAN).

He later obtained a Postgraduate Degree in Corporate Finance from the University of Liverpool. He also completed a course in Management Executive Education with a focus on Negotiation and Influence at the University of Massachusetts.

== Career ==
Okunjimi John Odimayo began his professional career as an Account Officer at Acorn Petroleum PLC. He subsequently held several finance and commercial roles in the energy sector, including Chief Finance Officer at Somerset Energy Services, Head of Trade Finance and Operations at Bellpoint Energy Ltd, and Head of Commercial at Addax and Oryx Group Nigeria.

He is the founder and Chief Executive Officer of the Arowolo Group of Companies, a business conglomerate with interests in petroleum marketing, transport and logistics, and agriculture, through subsidiaries such as Arowolo Oil and Gas Ltd, Arowolo Transport and Logistics Ltd, and Arowolo Agro-Allied Ltd.

In public service, Odimayo served from 2016 to 2019 as a member of the Governing Council of the Ondo State University of Science and Technology (OSUSTECH). In 2020, he contested in the Ondo State gubernatorial primary election under the All Progressives Congress (APC) but later stepped down in support of Rotimi Akeredolu.,

He was elected in 2023 to the House of Representatives, where he represents the Okitipupa/Irele Federal Constituency. He currently serves as the Chairman of the House Committee on the National Population Commission.
