= Fredrick Obateru Akinruntan =

Nigerian businessman and traditional ruler

Olugbo of Ugbo Kingdom
- Reign: 2009–present
- Predecessor: Oba Banjo Mafimisebi
- Born: 1950 (age 75–76); Ugbo Kingdom, Ondo State, Nigeria
- House: Adetolugbo of Ugbo Kingdom
- Father: Sir Frederick Adetolugbo

Fredrick Obateru Akinruntan is a Nigerian businessman and the traditional ruler of Ugbo Kingdom, a Nigerian traditional state in Ilaje Local Government, Ondo State, southwestern Nigeria. He is the founder of Obat Oil, a privately held oil company.

Obateru was born in 1950 into a royal family in Ugbo and lost his father when he was young. He became the Olugbo of Ugbo Kingdom in 2009 after a succession dispute and lawsuit. He has made statements about Yoruba history that have been disputed by others.

Obateru established Obat Oil in 1981. The company has more than 50 gas stations across the six geopolitical zones of Nigeria, and the company owns a modern storage facility in Lagos that can store 65 million liters of petroleum products. Obateru appointed his second son, Prince Akinfemiwa Akinrutan, as the managing director of the company. In May 2013, a Federal High Court sitting in Abuja ordered the son's arrest on charges of disobeying a court order, following a suit filed and argued before the court by Barrister Iyke Ukadike. In 2021, Obat Oil was ordered to sell one of its assets, a hotel in Abuja, to fulfill a debt owed to a bank.

In an interview with Daily Post in 2014, Obateru said "I have a $1 million watch, I use the same type of car like the Queen of England". He also said he was the first Black person to buy the 2014 model of Bentley automobile.
