= Johnvents Group =

- Industry: Agriculture
- Founded: 2016
- Founder: John Alamu
- Headquarters: Nigeria
- Website: https://www.johnvents.com/

Johnvents Group is a multinational corporation active in agribusiness and manufacturing. Founded in 2016, the company operates across Africa, Asia, and the Middle East.

== History ==
Johnvents Group was established in 2016 by John Alamu to enhance agro-commodity outputs by engaging both smallholder and large-scale farmers. The company expanded its operations through investments in processing, trading, and manufacturing.

=== Key Milestones ===
In 2021, Johnvents Group established an 18,000 metric ton (MT) cocoa processing facility, the Johnvents Cocoa Factory, to produce cocoa derivatives for export to Europe and North America. That same year, the company received commendation from the then Governor of Ondo State, Rotimi Akeredolu, during the commissioning of a 15,000 MT cocoa facility. In 2022, Johnvents Industries Limited was awarded Best Cocoa Dairy Company in Nigeria at the BusinessDay Leadership Awards.

In 2023, Johnvents partnered with Lagos Rice Company, redeemed a N5.5 billion commercial Paper, and acquired Premium Cocoa Products Ile-Oluji, increasing its cocoa processing capacity to 48,000 MT annually. In October 2023, the African Export-Import Bank signed a term sheet with Johnvents Industries Limited for a US$40 million pre-export facility to support the processing and export of agricultural commodities.

By 2024, Johnvents was Nigeria's largest exporter of sesame seeds, second in Africa and fourth globally, generating ₦700 billion (US$200 million) in export revenue from cocoa derivatives, soybeans, and other commodities. During the same year, the company entered into a ₦35 billion financing agreement with the International Finance Corporation to support its cocoa operations and expand Johnvents' cocoa processing capacity and its export to global markets. In June 2024, the Federation of Cocoa Commerce announced Johnvents Industries Limited as a voting member under Production and Exportation category

In 2025 the British International Investment, the UK's development finance institution, announced a $40.5 million investment in Johnvents Group.

== Subsidiaries ==
- Johnvents Industries DMCC
- Johnvents Foods
- Johnvents Cocoa Factory
- Johnvents Trading (JVT)
- Premium Cocoa Products Ile-Oluji (PCPIL)
