= John Alamu =

Nigerian entrepreneur (born 1992)

John Alamu Adedamola
- Born: 21 August 1992 (age 34)
- Citizenship: Nigerian
- Education: Federal University of Agriculture, Abeokuta Olabisi Onabanjo University
- Occupations: Founder and CEO
- Notable work: Group Managing Director of Johnvents Group

John Adedamola Alamu (born 21 August 1992) is a Nigerian entrepreneur. He is the founder and Group Managing Director of CapitalSage Holdings, a conglomerate with interests in fintech, agribusiness, manufacturing, and healthcare. Alamu also established Johnvents Group, an agribusiness and manufacturing company operating across Africa, Asia, and the Middle East.

== Early life and education ==
Alamu was born on 21 August 1992 in Nigeria. He earned a Bachelor of Science degree in statistics from the Federal University of Agriculture, Abeokuta, in 2012. He later obtained a Postgraduate Diploma and a Master of Science in Statistics from Olabisi Onabanjo University in 2015 and 2016, respectively.

== Career ==
=== Early career ===
Alamu began his professional journey as a Monitoring and Evaluation Specialist at the International Institute of Tropical Agriculture (IITA). He subsequently worked as a consultant for organizations including Catholic Relief Services (CRS), the Food and Agriculture Organization (FAO), and the International Fertilizer Development Center (IFDC), focusing on agricultural research and data analysis.

=== CapitalSage Holdings ===
In 2014, Alamu founded CapitalSage Holdings, initially operating as a microfinance institution. The company has since experienced diversified operations in fintech, agribusiness, manufacturing, and healthcare. Its fintech arm, CapitalSage Technology, encompasses platforms such as Kolomoni and Ercas, aiming to enhance financial inclusion across Africa. As of 2022, CapitalSage expanded its operations to countries including Kenya, the Benin Republic, The Gambia, Cameroon, and Togo.

=== Johnvents Group ===
In 2016, Alamu established Johnvents Group, focusing on the agricultural value chain. In 2022, Johnvents Industries Limited was awarded Best Cocoa Dairy Company in Nigeria at the BusinessDay Leadership Awards. In 2023, Johnvents acquired Premium Cocoa Products Ile-Oluji, a 30,000 metric ton cocoa processing facility, enhancing its processing capacity. In 2021, the then Ondo State Governor, Rotimi Akeredolu commended Johnvents for its massive cocoa investment in the state during the official commissioning of its 15,000 metric tonnes. In October 2023, the African Export-Import Bank (Afreximbank) signed a term sheet with Johnvents Industries Limited for a US$40 million pre-export facility to support the processing and export of agricultural commodities. By 2024, the group had become Nigeria's largest exporter of sesame seeds, generating significant export revenue

== Initiatives and recognition ==
Alamu has been involved in initiatives aimed at supporting farmers and promoting sustainable agricultural practices. In 2024 Alamu was able to help Johnvents secure a ₦35 billion financing agreement with the International Finance Corporation (IFC) to support its cocoa operations. In 2025, Johnvents Group received a $40.5 million investment from British International Investment to optimize production efficiency and strengthen sustainability programs
