= Lucky Aiyedatiwa =

Nigerian politician (born 1965)

His Excellency Lucky Aiyedatiwa
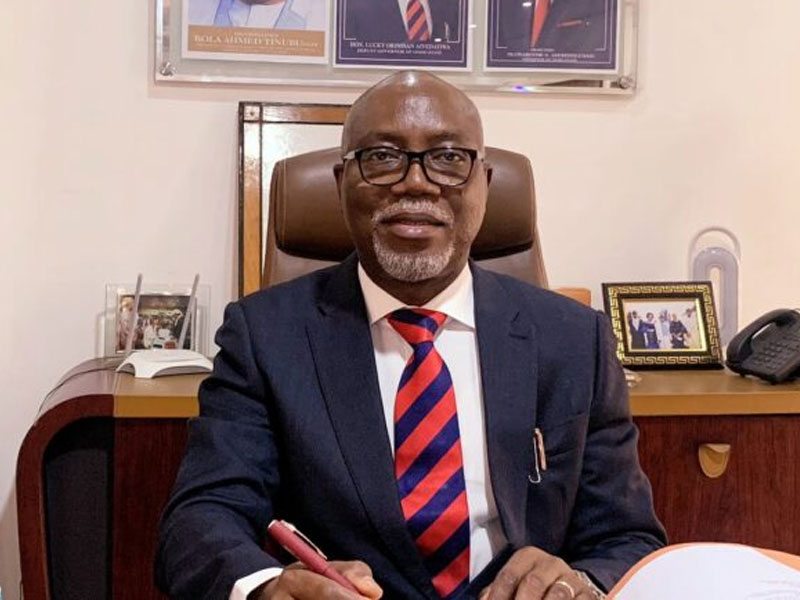

Governor of Ondo State
- Incumbent
- Assumed office 27 December 2023; Acting: 13 December 2023 – 27 December 2023
- Deputy: Olayide Adelami
- Preceded by: Rotimi Akeredolu
- Acting; 13 June 2023 – 7 September 2023
- Preceded by: Rotimi Akeredolu
- Succeeded by: Rotimi Akeredolu

Deputy Governor of Ondo State
- In office 24 February 2021 – 27 December 2023
- Governor: Rotimi Akeredolu
- Preceded by: Agboola Ajayi
- Succeeded by: Olayide Adelami

Personal details
- Born: Lucky Orimisan Aiyedatiwa; 12 January 1965 (age 61) Ilaje, Western Region (now in Ondo State), Nigeria
- Party: All Progressive Congress (APC)
- Spouse: Oluwaseun Aiyedatiwa
- Children: 3
- Education: Ikosi High School
- Alma mater: Lagos State College of Education; University of Ibadan; Lagos Business School; Pan Atlantic University; University of Liverpool
- Occupation: Politician; businessman

Lucky Orimisan Aiyedatiwa (born 12 January 1965) is a Nigerian businessman and politician who has served as governor of Ondo State since 2023. He previously served as deputy governor of Ondo State from 2021 to 2023 under Governor Rotimi Akeredolu. He is a former commissioner of Niger Delta Development Commission.

On 13 December 2023, Aiyedatiwa became acting governor following the departure of Governor Rotimi Akeredolu on medical leave. He had previously served as acting governor from June to September 2023 when Akeredolu was on medical leave.

== Early life ==
Aiyedatiwa was born on 12 January 1965. He hails from Obe-Nla, an oil-bearing community in Ilaje Local Government Area of Ondo State.

== Background ==
Aiyedatiwa had his primary education at Saint Peter's UNA (now FAC) Primary School, Obe Nla/Obe Adun, in Ilaje LGA of Ondo State between 1970 and 1976. He had his secondary education at Ikosi High School, Ketu, Lagos, in 1982. In 1986, he obtained the Nigeria Certificate in Education (NCE) in economics and government from Lagos State College of Education (now Adeniran Ogunsanya College of Education), Ijanikin, Lagos; he later attended the University of Ibadan for an advanced diploma in business administration in the year 2001. He became an alumnus of Lagos Business School – Pan Atlantic University, Lekki, Lagos where he obtained postgraduate certification in chief executive education (CEP) in business management in 2009. In 2013, he obtained a master's degree in business administration (MBA) from the University of Liverpool, United Kingdom.

== Career ==
Aiyedatiwa worked as an inventory/store officer at Scoa Assembly Plant Plc, Apapa, Lagos, between 1982 and 1983. In 1987 he was assistant head teacher at Reliance International Schools, Ijokodo, Ibadan. In 1990, he became a marketing officer at Universal Pharmaceutical Supply Co. Ltd, Ikeja, Lagos. In 1992, he was an assistant investment analyst, Global Trust Limited, Gbagada, Lagos; he was general merchandise manager, Biz Mart Nigeria Limited, Lagos Island, Lagos, 1994.

He is the MD/CEO of Blue Wall Group of Companies which he established in 1996 which includes; Blue Wall Nigeria Ltd, a trading company, Blue Wall BDC Nigeria Ltd, a Central Bank of Nigeria (CBN) licensed foreign exchange trading company and Blue Wall Safety Travels and Tours, an IATA licensed travel agency and logistic company.

== Early political career ==
Aiyedatiwa joined active politics in 2011 as a card-carrying member of the Action Congress of Nigeria (ACN), which later merged with other political parties and became the All Progressives Congress (APC). He was one of the National Delegates from Ondo State at the All Progressives Congress (APC) National Convention at Abuja in 2014. He contested for the Federal House of Representative for Ilaje/Ese-Odo Federal Constituency in the 2015 Presidential and National Assembly General Election.

== Niger Delta Development Commission ==
Aiyedatiwa served as the federal commissioner who represented Ondo State on the Board of Niger Delta Development Commission from 2018 to 2019.

== Ondo State Government ==
Aiyedatiwa was selected as the running mate of the governor of Ondo State Rotimi Akeredolu in the 2020 Ondo State gubernatorial election.

On 11 October 2020, Akeredolu and Aiyedatiwa were elected governor and deputy governor of Ondo State as announced by the Independent National Electoral Commission.

On 25 February 2021, they were sworn into office as governor and deputy governor of Ondo State respectively.

Aiyedatiwa became acting governor of Ondo State on 13 December 2023, as Akeredolu left for end-stage leukaemia treatment. He was previously acting governor from June to September 2023 when Akeredolu was on medical leave.

=== Governorship ===
On 27 December 2023, Akeredolu died and Aiyedatiwa was sworn in as governor. He was declared the winner of the 2024 Ondo State gubernatorial election, held on 16 November 2024, defeating his closest rival, Agboola Ajayi of the Peoples Democratic Party.

== Aides ==
Sequel to Aiyedatiwa’s inauguration as the Ondo State Governor, he appointed aides to serve as Commissioner, SA, SSA, SSG, AG etc.

Aiyedatiwa’s cabinet appointment includes but not limited to:

Special Advisers (SAs)

Engr. Johnson Alabi, Dr. Seun Osamaye, Comrade Bola Taiwo, Prof Simidele Odimayo, and more

Senior Special Assistants (SSAs)

Hon. Omotayo Abidakun, Hon Akintoye Albert, Akindele Adeniyi, Oluyemi Fasipe, and more
