= Ode-Irele =

Coordinates: 06°29′23″N 004°52′09″E

Ode-Irele (Irele) is a town in Ondo State of Nigeria, West Africa. It is the administrative headquarters for the Irele Local Government Area. Ode-Irele is located 10 kilometres (6 mi) by road east of the town of Okitipupa.

The traditional ruler (Ọba) of Ode-Irele is traditionally entitled the Olofun. This position has remained vacant since the demise of Oba Feyisara Odimayo in 1993. Whoever fills this position is the paramount ruler of the Ode-Irele Kingdom, a first class King by ranking in Ondo state. It is the turn of Opetusin ruling house to present a candidate. However, the Oyenusis, whom according to history was a different family never known to have occupied such a position before claims to be entitled. This claim has no previous precedent and has never happened before in the history of the previous Olofuns.

According to tradition and history there are three ruling houses in Ode Irele. These are the Orunbemekun Royal house, Jagboju Royal house and Opetusin Royal House.

On 15 April 2015 a group of young men broke into the inner sanctum of the shrine to Molokun, the god of the land, in Ode-Irele. Their objective was apparently to obtain certain items of spiritual power. This was followed by the deaths of twenty youths in the community due to methanol poisoning from drinking a locally distilled brew containing unidentified herbs. Chief Moses Enimade, the king of Ode-Irele, believes that the deaths were in punishment for the sacrilege.
