= Prince Adedapo Benjamin Adelegan =

Nigerian politician and entrepreneur

Adedapo Adelegan
- Born: 20 April 1962 (age 64); Lagos State, Nigeria
- Education: University of Ilorin
- Occupations: Politician and entrepreneur
- Website: www.adedapoadelegan.com

Adedapo Benjamin Adelegan (born 20 April 1962) is a Nigerian politician and entrepreneur who was the 14th president and chairman of the council of the Nigerian-British Chamber of Commerce (NBCC), a fellow and executive member, Institute of Directors, counsel of member, Lagos Chamber of Commerce and Industry, and a Gubernatorial candidate for the Ondo State Election under the African Democratic Congress (ADC).

== Early life ==
He was the convener of the popular Lekki Sunsplash musical concert, Africas biggest musical event in 1988. The event has the likes of Raskimono, Fela Anikulapo Kuti, Daniel Wilson, Majek Fashek, Alex Zitto, Kwam1, and more in Attendance. The popular comedian, Alibaba worked briefly with Adedapo as an executive assistant in 1991.

He organized the first Nigeria Exhibition in South Africa in the year 2004 called "The Best of Nigeria comes to South Africa" which he did with his company PR Africa.

He is from Owo, Ondo State, a kinsman to the current Governor of Ondo State Arakunrin Rotimi Akeredolu.

== Politics ==
Adedapo Adelegan emerged the governorship candidate of the African Democratic Congress in Ondo State for the 10 October 2020, election.

He joined the All Progressive Congress Ondo State chapter briefly when he decided to get on the race. He left the party when the National Working Committee of the party changed the structure of the Primaries election from direct to indirect form of voting, knowing it was an agenda to give the incumbent the ticket.

He came sixth in the 2020 Ondo state gubernatorial election.

== Personal life ==
Adedapo is married to Abimbola Adelegan and they have three children. He is a devout Christian.
