= Segun Abraham =

Nigerian politician and businessman (Born 1953)

- Born: Olusegun Abraham; 24 December 1953 (age 72); Ikare-Akoko, Ondo State, Nigeria
- Education: Tyndale University College and Seminary; Institute of Directors
- Occupations: Politician; businessman
- Years active: 1999–present
- Political party: All Progressives Congress
- Spouse: Bunmi Abraham
- Website: segunabraham.com

Olusegun Abraham (born 24 December 1953) is a Nigerian politician and businessman.

== Early life and education ==
Olusegun was born and raised in Ikare-Akoko, Ondo State, where he had his early formal education. He holds a master's degree in Technology management. He has also undertaken professional courses in notable institutions including Tyndale University College and Seminary, Canada and the Institute of Directors, United Kingdom.

== Career ==
In 1999, Segun Abraham delved into politics while managing his business ventures simultaneously. He was one of the pioneering members of the All Progressives Congress when it was still called Alliance for Democracy. Olusegun was also one of those who campaigned for former governor Adebayo Adefarati. He went on to be appointed the chairman of Owena Hotels by Adebayo Farati until the hotel was bought by Oodua Investment.

In 2012, he declared his intention to run for Governor of Ondo State under the platform of the Action Congress of Nigeria but he however came short of Rotimi Akeredolu who went on to represent the party as its aspirant.

He was one of the two aspirants under the platform of the All Progressives Congress who ran for the office of governor at the 2016 Ondo State gubernatorial election, but lost out to Oluwarotimi Akeredolu at the primaries.
