= Olayide Adelami =

Nigerian politician

His Excellency Olayide Adelami
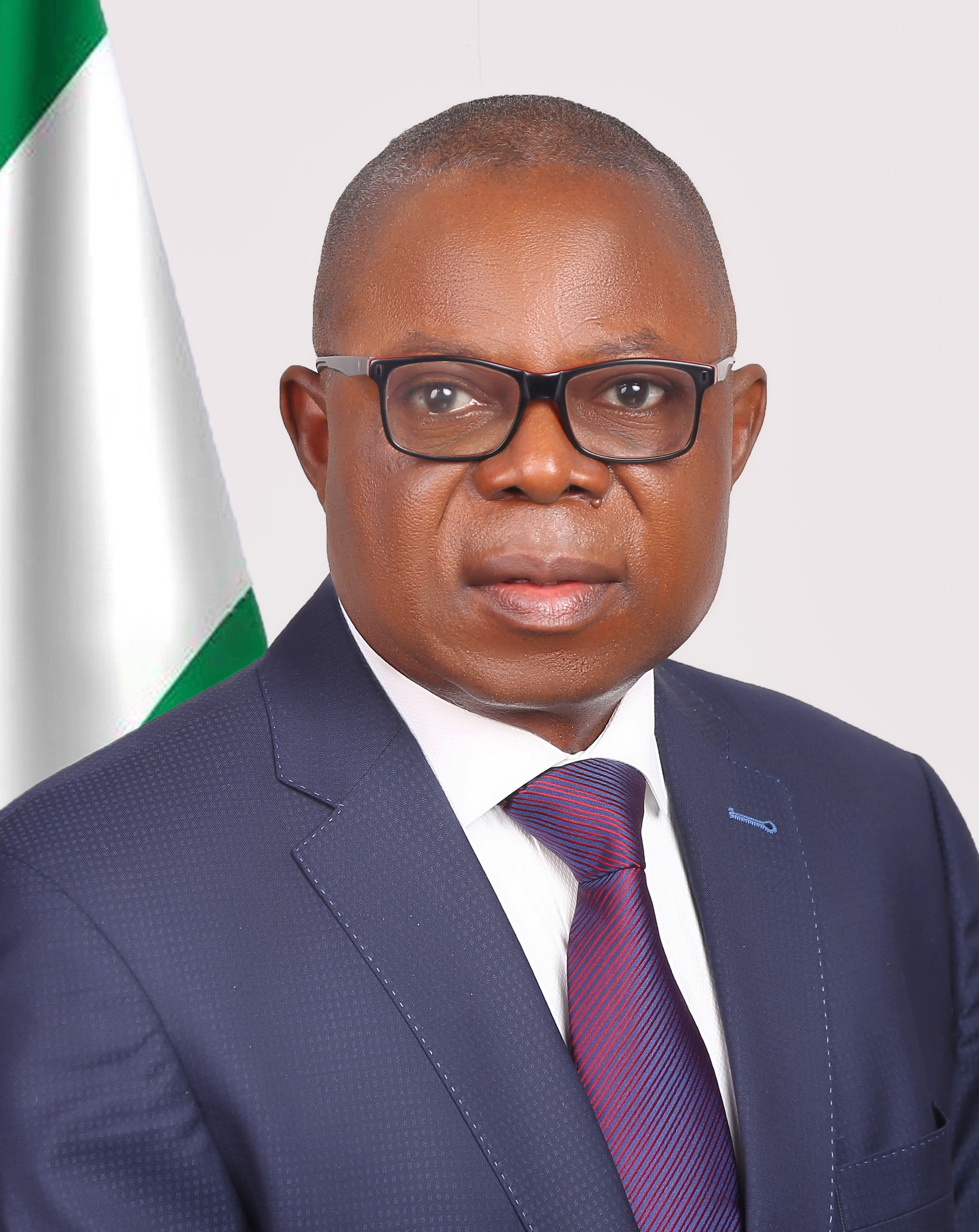

Deputy Governor of Ondo State
- Incumbent
- Assumed office 1 February 2024
- Governor: Lucky Aiyedatiwa
- Preceded by: Lucky Aiyedatiwa

Personal details
- Born: Olayide Owolabi Adelami; 3 April Owo, Western Region, British Nigeria (now in Ondo State, Nigeria)
- Party: All Progressives Congress (APC)
- Education: St. Francis Catholic Primary School
- Alma mater: The Polytechnic, Ibadan (GCE A-level); University of Lagos (BBA); Ogun State University (MBA); Nasarawa State University (PhD)
- Occupation: Politician

Olayide Owolabi Adelami, mni (born 3 April) is a Nigerian politician who has served as the deputy governor of Ondo State since 1 February 2024. He previously served as the Deputy Clerk to the National Assembly.

== Early life and education ==
Adelami was born in Owo, Ondo State, Nigeria. His had his primary education at St. Francis Catholic Primary School, and later continued at Imade College in Owo. He obtained a GCE A-level certificate from The Polytechnic, Ibadan. Adelami earned his BSc in Business Administration from the University of Lagos, a master's degree in the same course from Ogun State University, and a Doctorate degree in Security and Strategic Studies from Nasarawa State University.

== Career ==
Adelami worked as an accountant in December 1983, at the Federal Civil Service Commission. From 1996 to 2000, he was appointed in high offices including at the National Hospital, Abuja.

Adelami became the Head of the Finance and Accounts Department of the National Assembly in Ondo State until 2007, when he was appointed as the Director. He did a senior management course precisely course 54 at the National Institute of Policy and Strategic Studies in 2008. In 2014, Adelami was promoted to Permanent Secretary of the Directorate of Procurement, Estate, and Works, a role he held until his appointment as Deputy Clerk to the National Assembly (Nigeria)

Adelami started a full-time political career in 2018, under the All Progressives Congress. He was appointed deputy governor of Ondo State by Governor Lucky Aiyedatiwa on 24 January 2024, and subsequently sworn in on 1 February 2024.
