= Irele =

- LGA
- Nickname: Ùrèlè Ẹgùn
- Motto(s): Ubo yìí eghó tií ho, jí éè r'óghò ka. 'The place where money fruits and there are no strangers to pluck it'
- Interactive map of Irele
- Location of Ikale in Nigeria
- Coordinates: 6°29′0″N 4°52′0″E
- Country: Nigeria
- State: Ondo State
- Headquarter: Ode-Irele

Area
  - Total: 939.6 km^{2} (362.8 sq mi)

Population (2006)
  - Total: 144,136
  - Density: 153.4/km^{2} (397.3/sq mi)
- Time zone: UTC+1 (WAT)
- Postal code: 352

Ikale
Ùkálẹ̀

Total population
- > 750,000 (2016)

Regions with significant populations
- Ondo State - 700,000; Okitipupa Local Government: 316,100; Irele Local Government: 194,600; Odigbo Local Government: 269,880; Ogun Waterside Local government

Religion
- Christianity; Yoruba religion

Related ethnic groups
- Ìlàjẹ, Ondó, Other Yoruba people, Ìtsẹ̀kírì, Àpóì

Irele is alocal government area in Ondo State, Nigeria. It's headquarters are in the town of Ode-Irele. It was originally part of the old Ikale LGA, which was split into Irele and Okitipupa LGAs. It has an area of 939.6 square kilometres (362.8 sq mi) and had a population of 144,136 at the 2006 census.

== History ==
The history of Irele links back to the Ugbo Kingdom among the Ilaje people. The Ugbos in turn migrated from Ile-Ife, cradle of Yoruba civilization. The throne of the Olofun Irele is primarily owned by the Orunbemekun Royal Family. The crown worn by the founding fathers of Irele Kingdom was brought from Ode-Ugbo.

As the history recounts, after the death of Olugbo Ameto (the 8th Olugbo of Ugbo Kingdom), his two princes: Ajana (elder) and Gbagba (younger), contested the vacant stool of their forefathers. The table was turned in favour of the younger brother, Gbagba, to the disadvantage of the elder brother, Ajana. This event angered Ajana and he left Ugbo Kingdom with his own men to found Irele Kingdom.

The contemporary Irele Kingdom is an expanse of land which initially began from Orofun (the original name of Igbekebo in Ese-Odo Local Government Area of Ondo State). At Orofun, Ajana was crowned the first Olorofun or Olofun (Lord of Orofun), exercising supreme control over the expanse of land stretching from there to the present day Ode Irele, capital of the kingdom.

Upon the death of Ajana, his two princes: Orunbemekun (elder) and Ogeleyinbo also known as Orungberuwa (younger) also contested the vacant stool of their fathers. Orunbemekun was eventually installed as the second Olofun. With the installation of Orunbemekun as the heir apparent and successor to the throne of Olofun Irele, his younger brother, Ogeleyinbo left to establish a kingdom known as Ode-Erinje, becoming the first king to be recognized as Orungberuwa of Ode Erinje.

Accordingly, Ode Irele, Ode Ajagba, Igodan Lisa, Ode Erinje and some other ikale towns are all directly linked to the Ugbo Ilaje via secondary migrations and ultimately, a primary migration from IIe ife after the Oduduwa vs Obatala episode of Ife history.

=== 20th century and modern monarchy ===
By the 19th century, Irele had become a major Ikale settlement under colonial rule. The town gradually moved from its older site at Idepe to the present location at Ode-Irele. In 1935, Oba Aladetubokanwa (Orunbemekun VIII) was installed and enforced the final relocation of the town, ushering in a period of educational and commercial growth.

On 14 May 1959, Oba Aladetubokanwa formalised the modern rotational system by creating three ruling houses – Orunbemekun (the original), Jagboju, and Oyenusi/Opetusin – at a meeting of the Ikale Idapometa District Council. He reigned until his death in 1971, after which the throne remained vacant for five years until Oba John Feyisara Odimayo (Jagboju VIII) was installed in 1976.

The stool has been vacant since Odimayo's death in 1993, with continuing disputes among the three ruling houses. As of 2025, the Ondo State Government has not approved a new Olofun.

== Economy ==
Irele Local Government Area's economy heavily depends on farming, and the region produces a variety of crops, including pepper and yam. Because the Local Government Area is home to several markets where a range of goods are bought and sold, trade is also thriving there. Irele Local Government Area's other significant economic pursuits are hunting and blacksmithing.

== Ikale Obas in The Irele LGA ==
- Larogbo of Akotogbo - Akotogbo(HRM Oba Barr.Micheal Elumaro Akinfolarin, LLM)
- Olofun Irele - Ode Irele
- Odogbo Omen - Ode Omen
- Ahaba Ajagba - Ode Ajagba
- Laragunshin Iyansan - Ode Iyansan
- Olughogho Iju-osun - Iju Osun
