= Agboola Ajayi =

Nigerian politician and lawyer (born 1968)

His Excellency Agboola Ajayi

Deputy Governor of Ondo State
- In office 24 February 2017 – 24 February 2021
- Governor: Rotimi Akeredolu
- Preceded by: Lasisi Oluboyo
- Succeeded by: Lucky Aiyedatiwa

Member of the House of Representatives of Nigeria from Ondo
- In office 5 June 2007 – 6 June 2011
- Succeeded by: Akinjo Victor
- Constituency: Ilaje/Ese-Odo

Personal details
- Born: Alfred Agboola Ajayi; 24 September 1968 (age 58) Kiribo, Ese-Odo, Western State, Nigeria (now in Ondo State)
- Party: Peoples Democratic Party (2020; 2021–present)
- Other political affiliations: All Progressives Congress (before 2020); Zenith Labour Party (2020–2021)
- Education: Igbinedion University, Okada
- Occupation: Politician; lawyer; businessman

Alfred Agboola Ajayi (born 24 September 1968) is a Nigerian politician, lawyer, and businessman who served as deputy governor of Ondo State from 2017 to 2021.

On 21 June 2020, Ajayi resigned his membership from the ruling party All Progressives Congress (APC) and defected to the opposition party Peoples Democratic Party (PDP), citing irreconcilable differences between him and his governor, Rotimi Akeredolu and that the APC party 'has become a poisoned space'. He then joined Zenith Labour Party after losing the PDP gubernatorial primaries to Eyitayo Jegede. He was the 2020 gubernatorial candidate of Ondo State in Zenith Labour Party led by former governor Olusegun Mimiko.

== Early life and education ==
Ajayi was born on 24 September 1968 to Chief Newton Ajayi and Mrs Rebecca Ogunjinte (née Olubusade). He hails from Kiribo Town of Western Apoi tribe in the Ese Odo 'Local Government Area' (LGA) of Ondo State. He attended Community High School in Kiribo Town and later moved to Methodist High School in Okitipupa LGA. He then went on to study Law degree at Igbinedion University, Okada in Edo State and graduated with Bachelor of Law (LL.B) at 2nd Class Upper division; and subsequently received his Call to the bar in 2010 after graduating from the Nigerian Law School in Abuja.

== Political career ==
Ajayi started his political career under the platform of Social Democratic Party (SDP) and became the chairman of SDP in Old Opoi Ward 1 from 1988 to 1998. He later joined Peoples Democratic Party (PDP) in 1998 and was made the Secretary of PDP in Ilaje/Ese Odo LGA between 1998 and 1999. He was later made the Supervisor for Agriculture for Ese-Odo LGA from 1999 to 2001 and subsequently appointed as Supervisor for Works and Transport for Ese-Odo LGA from 2001 to 2003. He then went on to become the Caretaker Chairman of Ese Odo LGA between 2003 and 2004 before he was finally elected as the chairman of Ese-Odo LGA from 2004 to 2007. He also served as former member of the Federal House of Representatives and represented Ilaje/Ese Odo federal constituency under the PDP. During his time in the House, Ajayi served as the chairman House Committee on NDDC from 2007 to 2010.

Ajayi later decamped from PDP to APC and contested election as the running mate to Rotimi Akeredolu (SAN) in the Ondo State Governorship election in November 2016 under the platform of APC. The pair won the election and were sworn in as governor and deputy governor of Ondo State on 24 February 2017. He contested the October 2020 Governorship election in Ondo Election with Gboye Adegbenro as his running mate. On 11 October 2020, Akeredolu and Lucky Orimisan Aiyedatiwa were re-elected Governor and deputy governor of Ondo State as announced by the Independent National Electoral Commission. On 25 February 2021, Akeredolu and Aiyedatiwa were sworn into office as Governor and Deputy Governor of Ondo state respectively.

== Controversies ==
In 2019, Ajayi was accused of having lied to gain admission into the Nigerian Law School while he was still in a full-time employment with the Nigerian government.

He has also been having a political battle for months with his boss, Governor Rotimi Akeredolu, whom he accused of attempting to strangulate his political ambition; citing that acrimonious situation as the main reason why he decamped from APC and defected to PDP. Ajayi had earlier denied having any problem at all with Governor Akeredolu, and dismissed such rumours and speculations in the past as pure "political propaganda" that was being perpetrated and orchestrated by 'political jobbers" who were bent on causing crisis.

But on 20 June 2020, following the order from the Governor, the police commissioner of Ondo State (CP Bolaji Salami) and his armed policemen restricted and barred Ajayi from leaving his official residence in the Government House for over four hours; and when he finally gained his freedom he went straight to his Apoi Ward 2 in Ese-Odo LGA to tender his resignation from the APC party and thereafter crossed over to the PDP ward office to register his new membership.

Since his defection, the Governor and APC party have called on Ajayi to resign his position as the deputy governor of Ondo State. But Ajayi has refused to resign and claims that he still remains the elected deputy governor of Ondo State despite moving to the opposition party PDP. On 23 June 2020, two days after his defection to PDP, Governor Akeredolu ordered that all Ajayi's seven aides be withdrawn, including the two aides assigned to the wife of the embattled deputy governor. News of a possible impeachment continues to also circulate with the rumour that members of the Ondo State House of Assembly are plotting or making plans to impeach him out of office.

== Personal life ==
Ajayi is married to Chief Ajewole Agboola Ajayi JP and they have children.
