= Ugbo Kingdom =

Nigerian traditional state

The Ugbo Kingdom is a Yoruba kingdom (a Nigerian traditional state) in the Ilaje local government area of Ondo State, South West Nigeria, with its capital in Ode Ugbo. The people of Ugbo Kingdom are predominantly fishermen.

== Administration ==
Ugbo Kingdom consists of sixteen quarters and is headed by appointed chiefs according to their traditions and customs. One of the heads of the quarters, called Chief Gbogunron, is responsible for putting the traditional ritual leaves on the newly appointed King on coronation day. The traditional ruler of the Ugbo Kingdom is called the Olugbo of Ugbo Kingdom. As of 2019, the Olugbo of Ugbo Kingdom is Fredrick Obateru Akinruntan.

== Geography ==
Ugboland is located along the coastal shores of south-western Nigeria. Close neighbours of Ugbo people include the Ikales, the Itshekiris, the Ijaws, the Apois, the Ijebus, and the Edos. Ugboland occupies the coastline of the South-Western region of Nigeria in the current Ondo State. The entire area consist coastal landmarks, creeks, rivers and lagoons. It is within the western zone of the Niger Delta beginning from the Bight of Benin in the East, and all the way from Oghoye through several Ugboland creeks to Abetobo.

Ugboland is situated on an elevation of between 1.0 and 1.5 meters above sea level.

== Climate and vegetation ==
Ugboland is in the swampy mangrove forest zone, the temperature fluctuates according to the frequency of rainfall. Usually, the area has two distinct seasons i.e. rain and dry season. The rainy season is usually typically last for about nine months each year with about 2500mm per annum of rainfall, which falls between February and November every year, followed by the dry season which can last for three months. The temperature of the area fluctuates between 22 °C in the rainy season and 28 °C in the dry season.

The climatic condition of Ugboland does encourage forest growing. The place is situated and serves areas which are largely in the tropical monsoon climate. The lands with three distinct seasons, (cold, hot and rainy) exert great influence on the appearance of the vegetation. The trees are fairly tolerant of local, physical and climatic conditions to survive. They grow rapidly in the rainy season, shed their leaves during the hot/dry season and remain comparatively inactive in the cool season. Trees are normally deciduous since they shed their leaves during the hot dry season to withstand excessive transpiration.

== Economy ==
Expectedly, the people of Ugboland are predominantly fishermen and salt-makers which make them depend very much on water and consequently their close attachment to water elements. The Ugbo people and their other Ilaje kinsmen are all over the world engaged in high seas as well as in shallow waters.

The Ugbo people are also into the timber trade. With the aid of the waterways, several logs of timber are ferried from the Ilaje and Ikale settlements through the lagoon route to the various sawmills situated along the water fronts of Ebute-Metta, Epe in Lagos State as well as Sapele in Delta State.

The amiable people of the Ilaje stock also engage themselves in other fishing-related activities such as the production of fish traps (Igere) with the raw materials solely from the raffia palms that are obtainable from palm trees that dot the entire landscape of Ugboland. The people are also into fishing net making as well as its repair.

The Ugbo-Ilaje use canoes in their several sizes, to transport people from one location to the other along the creeks and these are also used for buying and selling from one settlement to the other. Due to the industrious nature of the Ugbo people their trade, transportation and fishing activities go as far as Warri, Sapele, Port Harcourt, Calabar, Escravos, Bonny Island and other neighboring countries such as Cameroon, Gabon, Benin Republic, Togo, Ghana and up until Côte d'Ivoire.

Because of the availability and abundance of palm trees in their assorted forms, the Ugbo people, expectedly also engage in the distillation of alcoholic drinks. After production, the drinks are taken to other places such as the south-western and south-eastern parts of Nigeria where they are in high demand. This trade has really helped to boost the economy of the Ugbo people.

Unlike their forefathers who engaged in serious occupation of fishing, modern day Ugbo people are occupied with professions in the fields of banking, education, oil and gas, health, and so on. Several banks belonging to various generations are not in short supply in Ugboland. There are numerous oil and gas installations such as Chevron, Agip, express, Conoil etc. While schools and hospitals, both government and privately owned, dot the entire landscape of the kingdom.

== Settlements ==
The terrain of Ugbo broadly determines the kinds of settlements pattern as well as their predominant occupation which is fishing and salt-making. Accordingly, most towns and villages in Ugboland were operational fishing camps grown into large circuits. Also, many folklores myths and festivals celebrated by the people are associated with water, fishes, fishermen and the deep sea. The settlements of Ugboland are in three broad categories and could be itemised as:

1. Salt Water Area: this is by the coast of the sea and the settlement pattern here is linear. The sea shore is extensive and the people have a linear pattern of settlement along the coast.
2. Brackish Water Area: this is as you move away from the sea shore and approach the hinterland. The settlement pattern here is linear but broader than the salt water area.
3. Fresh Water Area: this is where the presence of vegetation is much more visible. More people settle in this zone making it more densely populated. Some call this area “Ilaje-Ugbo” i.e. “Ilaje of the forest” and it is usual to find Ugbo children learning the rudiments of swimming and fishing in this area.

The people of Ugboland as well as other Ilaje groups can be considered among the most migrating professionals in Africa and the West African coast in particular where they constantly look out for more amiable fishing areas. Due to their commitment to wholesale ocean fishing, they hold the ace as fishing experts in the coasts of Cameroon, Gabon, Benin Republic, Togo, Ghana up to Ivory Coast and beyond where they are the stock of the professional fishing groups.

Furthermore, in Nigeria, the people of Ugboland can be found as leaders of their trades in many fishing communities of Ogun State (Ode, Elefan, Makunetc), Lagos State (Badagry, Epe, Ajah, Ajegunle, Apapa, Ikorodu, Bariga, Makoko, Ijora etc), Delta State (Ago-Kutu, Surulere, Agogboro, Costainetc). Large communities of Ugbo people can also be found in Rivers, Cross Rivers, Akwa-Ibom as well as in Lokoja, Shiroro and Kainji area, as well as other countries.
