= Ondo East =

- LGA
- Interactive map of Ondo East
- Country: Nigeria
- State: Ondo State
- Headquarter: Bolorunduro

Area
  - Total: 896 km^{2} (346 sq mi)

Population (2006)
  - Total: 76,096
  - Density: 84.9/km^{2} (220/sq mi)
- Time zone: UTC+1 (WAT)
- Postal code: 351

Ondo East is a Local Government Area in Ondo State, Nigeria. Its headquarters are in the town of Bolorunduro.

The Local Government occupies an area of approximately 896 sq kilometers with a population of 76,096 according to the 2006 population census.

The Local Government is located in the equatorial region and shares boundaries on the North with Idanre Local Government, on the South with Ondo West Local Government. Ile-Oluji/Oke-Igbo Local Government on the East and Atakimosa west in Osun State on the North Eastern part.

Ondo East Local Government lies between latitude 5 501 and 50 051 and longitude 70 301 and 70 001 and it is dominated by feeder roads which serve as links between different communities within the Local Government.

The postal code of the area is 351.

== Climate ==
Ondo East falls within the tropical savanna climatic belt and experiences a long rainy season from April to October. Temperatures remain warm all year, and rainfall intensity peaks around July to September.
