= Eyitayo Jegede =

Nigerian lawyer and politician

Attorney General and Commissioner for Justice in Ondo State
- In office 2008–2016

Personal details
- Born: Ondo State, Nigeria
- Spouse: Eno Jegede
- Profession: Lawyer

Eyitayo Jegede SAN, is a Nigerian legal practitioner and politician. He was the Peoples Democratic Party (PDP) candidate in the 2016 and 2020 Ondo State gubernatorial elections.

== Early life and education ==
Jegede was born to the family of Chief Johnson Bosede, the Odopetu of Isinkan, Akure, and Mrs C.O Jegede (née Asokeji) from Ipele town, near Owo in Ondo State, Nigeria. He attended St. Stephen's "SA" Primary School, Modakeke, and later Aquinas College, Akure, from 5 January 1973 to July 1978. He was a senior prefect at Aquinas College and was active in sports. He obtained his Higher School Certificate Education at Christ's School Ado Ekiti. He was the school volleyball captain at Aquinas College, Akure and at Christ School, Ado Ekiti between 1978 and 1980. He also captained the university volleyball team at the University of Lagos, where he studied law between 1980 and 1983.

Jegede proceeded to the Nigeria Law School, Victoria Island, Lagos, and was called to the bar in 1984.

== Career ==
Jegede began his career as a legal practitioner in Yola during his National Youth Service Corps. In 1992, he was appointed a Notary Public by the Chief Justice of Nigeria and less than 10 years later was elevated to the rank of Senior Advocate of Nigeria. His legal practice included political cases and election petition matters.

He worked in the law firm of Murtala Aminu & Co. Yola, for 12 years, six of which he spent as the Head of Chambers. In 1996, he established his own law firm, Tayo Jegede & Co., with offices in Abuja and Yola. In 2009, he was appointed as Attorney General and Commissioner for Justice in Ondo State.

Jegede served as Chancellor of the Anglican Communion of Jalingo, Taraba State, and was once the Chancellor of the Anglican Diocese of Yola. He was a member of the Implementation Committee of American University, Yola, Adamawa State; Chairman of the Board of Governors, ABTI Academy International School; and a member of the Board of Trustees of Elizade University, Ilara-Mokin, Ondo State.

=== Political career ===
Jegede won the 2012 Ondo State PDP governorship primary election with 760 votes, defeating the deputy governorship candidate, Saka Lawal. On 23 November 2016, the Court of Appeal declared him the PDP gubernatorial candidate for that year's election, replacing Jimoh Ibrahim. He was again elected as the PDP candidate in the 2020 Ondo State governorship primary, polling 888 votes to defeat the deputy governor, Agboola Ajayi, who received 657 votes.
