= Akure South =

- LGA
- Interactive map of Akure South
- Location within Nigeria Location within Africa
- Coordinates: 7°12′N 5°12′E
- Country: Nigeria
- State: Ondo State
- Headquarter: Akure

Area
  - Total: 331 km^{2} (128 sq mi)

Population (2006)
  - Total: 353,211
  - Density: 1,070/km^{2} (2,760/sq mi)
- Time zone: UTC+1 (WAT)
- Postal code: 340

Akure South is a Local Government Area in Ondo State, Nigeria. Its headquarters are in the town of Akure.

It has an area of 331 km^{2} and a population of 353,211 at the 2006 census.

The postal code of the area is 340.

== Climate ==
Akure South has a typical tropical climate marked by substantial rainfall from April to October and a dry season dominated by warm, clearer conditions. Humidity and precipitation peak mid-year, while temperatures stay between 21–29 °C (70–84 °F) annually.

== Economy ==
There are various manufacturing enterprises in Akure South, which significantly boosts the local economy. Another significant aspect of the region is trade, with daily traffic drawing hundreds of buyers and sellers to markets like the Mojere market and the Tisco Supermarket. A variety of hotels, financial institutions, and schools are also located nearby.
