= Rotimi Akeredolu =

Nigerian politician and lawyer (1956–2023)

His Excellency Rotimi Akeredolu CON SAN

Governor of Ondo State
- In office 24 February 2017 – 27 December 2023
- Deputy: Agboola Ajayi (2017–2021); Lucky Aiyedatiwa (2021–2023)
- Preceded by: Olusegun Mimiko
- Succeeded by: Lucky Aiyedatiwa

President of the Nigerian Bar Association
- In office 2008 – August 2010
- Preceded by: Olisa Agbakoba
- Succeeded by: Joseph Bodurin Daudu

Attorney General of Ondo State
- In office 1997–1999
- Governor: Anthony Onyearugbulem; Moses Fasanya

Personal details
- Born: Oluwarotimi Odunayo Akeredolu; 21 July 1956 Owo, Western Region, British Nigeria (now in Ondo State, Nigeria)
- Died: 27 December 2023 (aged 67) near Hanover, Lower Saxony, Germany
- Party: Action Congress of Nigeria (before 2013); All Progressives Congress (from 2013)
- Spouse: Betty Anyanwu-Akeredolu (m. 1981)
- Children: 4
- Education: Obafemi Awolowo University
- Occupation: Lawyer; politician
- Website: aketi.org
- Nickname: Aketi

Oluwarotimi Odunayo Akeredolu CON SAN (21 July 1956 – 27 December 2023) was a Nigerian lawyer and politician who served as governor of Ondo State from 2017 until his death in 2023.

His adopted prefix was "Arakunrin", while his nickname was "Aketi". He was a Senior Advocate of Nigeria (SAN) who became president of the Nigerian Bar Association in 2008. Akeredolu was also a managing partner at the law firm of Olujinmi & Akeredolu, which he co-founded with Chief Akin Olujinmi, a former attorney general and minister for justice of Nigeria.

On 21 July 2020, Akeredolu was declared as the Ondo governorship candidate after the primary elections under the platform of the APC. During his time as governor of Ondo State, he also doubled as the chairman of Southwest Governors' Forum, a forum consisting of governors of the Southwest Nigerian states.

== Birth and education ==
Akeredolu was born on 21 July 1956 in Owo to Reverend J. Ola Akeredolu of the Akeredolu family and Lady Evangelist Grace B. Akeredolu of Aderoyiju family of Igbotu, Ese Odo, in Ondo State. His middle name, Odunayo, means "year of happiness" in Yoruba. Akeredolu began his primary education at Government Primary School in Owo. He later attended Aquinas College in Akure, Loyola College in Ibadan and Comprehensive High School, Ayetoro, where he obtained his Higher School Certificate. He studied law at the University of Ife (now Obafemi Awolowo University), graduating in 1977, and proceeded to the Nigerian Law School in 1978.

== Career ==
Akeredolu began his legal career as a junior counsel with the law firm, GM Ibru & Co. He was appointed Attorney General of Ondo State from 1997 to 1999. In 1998, he became a Senior Advocate of Nigeria. He was Chairman of the Legal Aid Council (2005–2006). In November 2009, he faced allegations of corruption when the Bar Association's third Vice-President, Welfare Secretary and Assistant Financial Secretary circulated a petition entitled "Complaints against your fraudulent manifestations, violation of the NBA". Subsequently, the allegations against him were reviewed and dropped by the National Executive council of the Nigerian Bar Association.

In a lecture in December 2009, Akeredolu said no amount of electoral reform or judicial system could give Nigeria free and fair elections if Nigerians themselves refused to take practical steps to ensure that their votes count. Later that month he stated that Umaru Yar'Adua, the President of Nigeria should have handed over to Vice-President Goodluck Jonathan in an acting capacity during his illness, a statement that was backed up by the Nigerian Bar Association who said he was authorized to speak on their behalf.

In 2012, the Nigerian Bar Association named its new secretariat in Abuja after Akeredolu, its president citing the need for "generational identification and recognition of those who had contributed immensely to the development of the association. The sheer courage for him to go through the rigour is a testimony to his selfless service."

On 4 February 2022, Akeredolu was named Grand Patron of the National Drug Law Enforcement Agency by its chairman, retired Brigadier General Mohammed Buba Marwa.

=== Governorship candidate, 2011 ===
In November 2011, Akeredolu was among a crowd of aspirants to be the Action Congress of Nigeria (ACN) candidate for governor of Ondo State in the 2012 elections. During an interview that month, Akeredolu said that he had become well known and respected as president of the Bar, and described himself as a Progressive. If elected, his priorities would include agricultural development, fish farming for export, improvements to education, jobs for youths and improved roads. He would provide free education and primary health care. He was in favour of increased subsidies and greater local control over public spending.

On 28 July 2012, Akeredolu was selected as the Action Congress of Nigeria candidate for governor of Ondo State during the ACN congress in Akure. His selection pitched him in a head-to-head battle with the incumbent, Olusegun Mimiko and Olusola Oke of the Peoples Democratic Party (PDP). Akeredolu promised to create 30,000 jobs in his first 100 days in office. His promise was refuted by the (PDP) as a ruse.

On 3 September 2016, Akeredolu was awarded the ticket to represent the newly merged All Progressives Congress (APC) in the 2016 elections for Governor. On 27 November 2016, he was declared winner of the keenly contested 2016 Ondo State gubernatorial election.

=== Governor of Ondo State ===
On 27 November 2016, Akeredolu was announced by the Independent National Electoral Commission as the winner of the Ondo State governorship election. He amassed 244,842 votes in the election to defeat Eyitayo Jegede of the Peoples Democratic Party (PDP) with 150,380 votes and Olusola Oke of the Alliance for Democracy (AD) with 126,889 votes. According to professor Ganiyu Ambali, INEC Returning Officer, Akeredolu defeated his two major opponents Jegede and Oke, to clinch victory. He was sworn in as the governor of Ondo State on 24 February 2017 in Akure, the Ondo State Capital.

=== Re-election, 2020 ===
In 2020, the Aketi Movement gathered the support of over 100 groups with 200,000 members across the three senatorial districts of Ondo State for the re-election of Akeredolu as the state governor.

On 29 July 2020, Akeredolu picked Lucky Aiyedatiwa as his running mate for the 2020 Ondo State Governorship election after the controversy between the Governor and his deputy, Agboola Ajayi. He beat Olusola Oke, D.I. Kekemeke, Jimi Odimayo, Segun Abraham and others in the APC primary election. Akeredolu was declared winner of the 2020 Ondo Governorship election on 11 October 2020, after winning 15 out of 18 local governments. The Independent National Electoral Commission announced his victory on the same day. He won with a total number of 292,830 valid votes against his major opponents from the Peoples Democratic Party and the Zenith Labour Party, Eyitayo Jegede and Agboola Ajayi respectively.

Akeredolu was sworn in for a second term in office on 24 February 2021. He and his new deputy, Lucky Aiyedatiwa, assumed office on the same date and he was the incumbent deputy governor of Ondo State.

Akeredolu advocated for the payment of taxes in the state to help boost the economy of the state and fulfilments of obligations.

Following party disputes senior aides resign, decamp to PDP (Peoples Democratic Party). In June 2022, Akeredolu called the Owo church attack against Catholics in Ondo "satanic".

Akeredolu was latterly starting up a sea port project in Ondo state and stated that his administration was committed to the completion of the project, which was initiated in his first term, saying the port would not only serve Nigeria but also the whole of West Africa once built.

== Illness and death ==
Akeredolu was undergoing treatment for leukaemia from January 2023, and had a long period of medical absence. On 12 December 2023, in advance of another period of medical leave, Akeredolu signed the notice appointing deputy governor Lucky Aiyedatiwa, as acting governor of the state. Akeredolu died 15 days later on 27 December, at age 67 in a German hospital where he was receiving treatment, with his cause of death being given as leukaemia and prostate cancer.

== National honours ==
In October 2022, a Nigerian national honour of Commander of the Order of the Niger (CON) was conferred on Akeredolu by President Muhammadu Buhari.

== See also ==
- Tunde Eso
