= Akure North =

- LGA
- Nickname: JTA
- Interactive map of Akure North
- Location within Nigeria Location within Africa
- Coordinates: 7°18′N 5°06′E
- Country: Nigeria
- State: Ondo State
- Headquarter: Iju/Itaogbolu

Area
  - Total: 660 km^{2} (250 sq mi)

Population (2006)
  - Total: 131,587
  - Density: 200/km^{2} (520/sq mi)
- Time zone: UTC+1 (WAT)
- Postal code: 340

Akure North is a Local Government Area in Ondo State, Nigeria. Its headquarters are in the town of Iju/Itaogbolu.

It has an area of 660 km^{2} (250 sq mi) and a population of 131,587 at the 2006 census.

The postal code of the area is 340.

== Climate ==
Akure North falls within Ondo State’s humid tropical savanna belt, experiencing a major rainy season from April to October and a shorter dry season. The LGA sees high rainfall around July to September and stable warm temperatures year-round.
