= Ese Odo =

- LGA
- Interactive map of Ese Odo
- Location within Nigeria
- Country: Nigeria
- State: Ondo State
- Headquarter: Igbekedo

Area
  - Total: 762 km^{2} (294 sq mi)

Population (2006)
  - Total: 154,978
  - Density: 203/km^{2} (527/sq mi)
- Time zone: UTC+1 (WAT)
- Postal code: 352

Ese Odo is a Local Government Area in Ondo State, Nigeria, populated by the Ijaw (Izon) ethnic sub groups of the Western Apoi tribe and the Arogbo tribe. Its headquarters are in the town of Igbekebo and its one of the LGA with crude oil in Ondo State. The biggest towns within this Local Government Area are Kiribo, Arogbo, Ukparama (Akpata, Opuba, Ajapa, Ukpe, Bolowou), Igbobini, Igbotu, and Igbekebo.

Ese-Odo being mainly an Ijaw (Izon) ethnic subgroup in Ondo State, makes it the only local government that are Ijoid in the whole of South-West, as most falls into the South-South geo-political groupings in Nigeria. It has an area of 762 km^{2} and a population of 154,978 at the 2006 census and its one of the oil producing LGA in the State.

The postal code of the area is 352. Notable people from Ese Odo LGA includes Come Sola Iji, Agboola Ajayi, Omoyele Sowore, Seun Botu (Engr) among others.

== Economy / Geography ==
Ese Odo LGA's rivers and tributaries are abundant in different kinds of seafood, making fishing a significant economic activity in the region. The cultivation of commodities like cocoa, cowpea, rubber, and plantains is another significant source of income for the residents of Ese Odo Local Government Area. A thriving trade industry and multiple markets with a wide range of goods being bought and sold are also features of Ese Odo Local government area.

With several rivers and tributaries, Ese Odo Local Government Area has a total area of 762 square kilometres (294 square miles). In Ese Odo Local Government Area, the average temperature is 26 degrees Celsius (79 degrees Fahrenheit), and the average humidity is 84 percent. In Ese Odo Local Government Area, the average wind speed is 13 km/h (8.1 mph).
