= Ilaje =

Ìlàjẹ
- LGA
- Ilaje Omuro
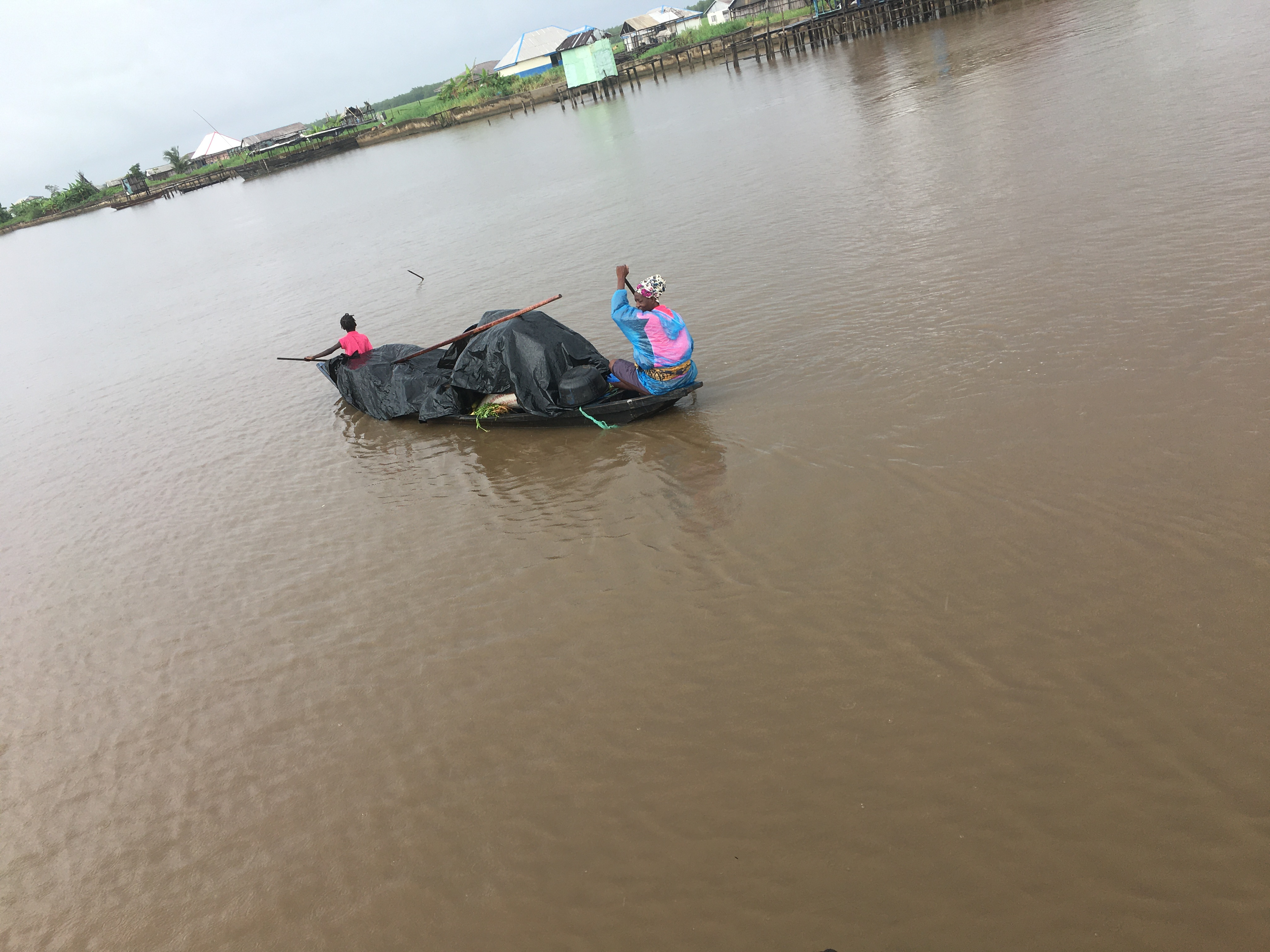
- Motto: Ayemafuge
- Interactive map of Ìlàjẹ
- Country: Nigeria
- State: Ondo State
- Headquarter: Igbokoda

Area
  - Total: 1,357 km^{2} (524 sq mi)
- Elevation: 0 m (0 ft)

Population (2022)
  - Total: 445,200
  - Density: 382/km^{2} (990/sq mi)
- Time zone: UTC+1 (WAT)
- Postal code: 352

The Ilaje Anthem

Ilaje is a Local Government Area in Ondo State, South-West Nigeria. Its headquarter is in the town of Igbokoda on the Olùwá river. It is inhabited by the Ilajes, who are a distinct migratory coastal group of ethnic Yoruba people indigenously spread along the coastal belts of; Ondo, Ogun, Lagos and Delta states. Large Ilaje communities can also be found in other littoral Nigerian states, including; Bayelsa, Rivers, Akwa Ibom, and further afield along the Gulf of Guinea coastline, eastwards through Cameroon and as far south as Equatorial Guinea and Gabon, from Corisco bay to Libreville, where they make up the majority of the West African fishing community.

The Ilajes were originally made up of four geo-political entities, namely: Ode Ugbo, Ode Mahin, Ode Etikan and Aheri. While most towns and villages in the Mahin kingdom (Ode Mahin) are located on arable land, those in the other three polities of Ugbo, Aheri and Etikan kingdoms are spread out along the sandy beaches and swampy terrain of the Bight of Benin coast of the Atlantic Ocean.

A short introductory expose of Itebu Kunmi village in Ùlàjẹ by a native speaker

== Origins ==
Ilajes were said to have left Ile Ife, their original ancestral home in the 10th century and migrated southwards towards the littoral coastline of southeastern Yorubaland. Today, they occupy the entire Atlantic shoreline of Ondo State, Nigeria with a significant proportion of the ilaje populace also settled on lands in the interior behind the coast such as Igbokoda.

== Geography ==
Ilaje local government area has an area of 1,357 km^{2} (524 sq mi) and a population of 290,615 at the 2006 census although the population can be said to have been under enumerated due to the riverine nature of the area, and lack of accessibility by road/land. Towards the western reaches, the Aheri and Etikan groups share a border with the Ijebus. The Ikale to the north bound the Mahins, the Itsekiri people who the Ilajes consider their cousins, share the eastern border with the Ugbos, the Yoruba speaking Apoi and Arogbo Ijaws are located to the north east in Ese Odo LGA and parts of Warri North, and the Atlantic Ocean is situated on the southern boundary. The projected population of the area in 2022 is over 445,000 inhabitants with a density of 328 people/km², and slightly more males than females. The terrain is criss-crossed by several rivers, creeks and lagoons such as; the Oluwa river, Alape river, Talita river, Igbokoda river, Ofara river, Ajapa creek, and the Mahin lagoon.

Ilaje Local Government was created out of the defunct Ilaje/Ese-Odo Local Government Area on October 1, 1996 by the Federal government of Nigeria. It consists of over four hundred towns and villages. It shares a local boundary in the North with Okitipupa Local Government within Ondo state, in the West with Ogun Waterside Local Government in Ogun State, in the East with Warri North in Delta State and bound in the south by Atlantic Ocean. It is covered by troughs and low land surfaces. The extreme South is covered by silt, mud flats and superficial sedimentary deposits.

The soil type is generally sandy along the coast, there is a contiguous sandy beach formation extending through the western part of the Local Government, from the Lekki peninsula in Lagos State to Araromi Seaside, Zion pepe, Agba, Etugbo, Ipare, Mahin and Ugbonla in the eastern part. The area is one of the highest coconut producing areas in West Africa. According to the 2006 National Population Census, the Local Government is one of the most populated in Ondo State, with a population figure of 289,838. It has a shoreline covering about 80 km, making Ondo State a state with one of the longest coastlines in Nigeria.

== Lifestyle ==
The Ilajes are a coastal people of Nigeria whose livelihoods and settlement patterns have been shaped by their aquatic skills and ability to adapt to the riverine environment. This adaptability contributed to the development of communities such as Ugbonla, Aiyetoro, Zion Pepe, and Orioke.

At its peak, Aiyetoro became particularly renowned for its economic prosperity, driven in part by the early discovery of crude petroleum. The community reportedly attained one of the highest per-capita income levels in Africa at the time, attracting visitors, tourists, researchers, and international attention. The Ilaje story remains a powerful example of resilience, innovation, and the ability to turn environmental challenges into opportunities.

Fishing is the major occupational engagement of the Ilajes. This is enhanced by about 75% of the area being riverine, granting easy access to the sea. The large scale fishing activities attract traders and consumers from all over the country. The largest fish market in Nigeria is situated in Igbokoda, the Headquarters of the Local Government. While timber portions of the timbers are essentially transported to Lagos for sales by means of the sea/water.

The natural environment of Ilajeland is particularly suitable for the development of large scale rice plantations and the salt industry. The occupational activities of the Ilajes include fishing, canoe making, lumbering, net making, mat making, launch building, farming and trading. Fishing however remains the major agricultural preoccupation of the Ilaje. This is underscored by the fact that the Ilaje's geographical sphere has one of the longest coastlines in Nigeria. Ilaje's fishing dexterity is underlined by a popular saying among the Ilaje which says that:

- Ubo ẹri ipa tọ, ilaje gwa to rin

meaning:

- Where the path of river currents flow through, there you will find the Ilaje.

Thousands of migrant Ilaje fishermen can be found in many other coastal communities all over Nigeria in places like; Epe, Escravos, Warri, Badagry, Brass, Nembe and beyond. Igbokoda, the Ilaje local government headquarters is fast becoming an international trade center as its popular market attracts traders not only from other part of Nigeria, but, also from other African countries. Ilaje fishing communities have over the years developed all along the eastern coastline of west Africa, particularly in Togo, Benin, Ghana, Cameroon and Gabon.

Ilajeland is only about 75 kilometres (47 mi) from Lagos and its aquatic environment present the area as a suitable environment for tourism. It is hoped that the Ondo State government and the government of Nigeria will help develop it into a world class tourist attraction. In the past the entire area suffered serious neglect and marginalization in the hands of the government. However, it appears that the Ondo State government has come to realize the importance of Ilajeland not only because it is her only outlet to the sea but also because it is her economic power house. The Ondo state government has managed to construct a few link roads between the ilaje coast and the hinterland, however, the Ilaje corridor is part of the ongoing Lagos-Calabar Coastal Highway project being built and funded by the Federal Government of Nigeria, with 71 km (44 mi) of it running through Ilaje territory.

The highlight of the Ondo State's recent development efforts is the acquisition of about 200 ha (490 acres) of land to be developed and built as a satellite town for the people displayed from their homes in towns and villages on the Atlantic coastline as a result of petroleum drilling and exploratory activities. No doubt, there is a big future for the area especially with the Olokola Development project by Ondo and Ogun State Governments.

== Climate change & Coastal erosion ==
Several Ilaje communities are severely threatened by constant sea surges accompanied by coastal attrition/erosion and land loss, a process which geologists term as Rapid coastal regression, leading to the loss of valuable property and territory. According to reports, as much as 30 metres (33 yards) of such littoral land is lost annually. The most severely affected communities include; Ayetoro, Idiogba, Mese, Gbarira, Awoye, Igo, Molutehin and Jiringho. Over the years, several Ilaje communities have been completely lost to the Atlantic Ocean, while many others have had to relocate from their original locations to other areas.

== Towns, Villages and Camps ==
Nowadays, all Ilaje settlements in Ondo state can are grouped under 4 major and 4 minor kingdoms namely;

- Mahin under His Royal Majesty, Amapetu of Mahin
- Ugbo under His Royal Majesty Olugbo of Ugbo Kingdom.
- Aheri under the Maporure
- Etikan under the Onikan of Etikan
- Odonla under the Alagho of Odonla
- Obenla land under the Olubo of Obenla
- Obe Ogbaro land under the Odoka of Obe Ogbaro
- Igbokoda under the Olu of Igbokoda and
- Igbo egunrin under the Odede of Igbo egunrin.

=== Ondo State ===
Ugbo Kingdom

- Abetobo zion
- Abokiti
- Ago Alufa
- Ago nati
- Ajegunle
- Alagbon zion
- Alagbon
- Amehin
- Apata ilaje
- Asumaga
- Awoye
- Ayetoro
- Bijimi
- Bowoto
- Eke atiye
- Eke baale
- Eke didi
- Eke ilutitun
- Eke itiola
- Eke maha
- Eke moki
- Eke nla
- Eke ofolajetan
- Eke yonren
- Ernna ogbeni
- Erunna
- Erunna lagbe
- Gbagara
- Idi-ogba
- Idogun
- Idogun ayadi
- Idogun ehinmore
- Ikorigho
- Ilepete
- Ilowo
- Ilowo ayetoro
- Ilowo Nla
- Ilowo ogunsemore
- Iluabo
- Imoluwa
- Jinrinwo
- Lepe
- Molutehin
- Obe Adun
- Obe akingboye
- Obe apata
- Obe Arenewo
- Obe Dapo
- Obe Enikanselu
- Obe ifenla
- Obe Iji
- Obe Jedo
- Obe Magbe
- Obe Nla
- Obe Ogbaro
- Obe Olomore
- Obe Orisabinone
- Obe Rebimino
- Obe Rewoye
- Obe Sedara
- Odofado
- Odonla
- Odonla meduoye
- Odun Ogungbeje
- Odun ojabireni
- Odun oriretan
- Odun Oyinbo
- Odun Yonren
- Ogbongboro
- Ogboti
- Oghoye
- Ojumole
- Okun ipin
- Olotu
- Olotu kuwo
- Olotu niye
- Olotu yara
- Orioke Harama
- Oroto
- Otumara
- Otumara seaside
- Owoleba
- Saheyi
- Uba Korigho
- Ubale
- Ubale kekere
- Ubale nla
- Ugbage
- Ugbo
- Ugbonla
- Womitenren
- Yaye
- Zion Ikerigho
- Zion Iluabo

Mahin Kingdom

- Abealala
- Ipare
- Alape junction
- Abereke
- Aboto
- Ago Doroh
- Ago Ikuebolati
- Ago Lulu
- Ago Olomidegun
- Akata
- Alagbede
- Aruwayo
- Asisa
- Atijere
- Betiegbofo
- Broke Camp
- Ebute Ipare
- Ehin - Osa
- Elegboro
- Ereke
- Ereke Majofodun
- Ereke Makuleyi
- Etigho
- Gbabijo
- Ibila
- Idigho
- Igbegunrin
- Igbo - Okuta
- Igbobi
- Igbokoda
- Igbolomi
- Ikale Camp
- Iloro
- Ilu Sosi
- Imoluwa
- Ita - Age
- Italita Camp
- Itebukunmi
- Job Camp
- Korolo
- Kugbonre
- Kurugbene
- Legha
- Lerenren
- Logede Camp
- Madagbayi
- Magbehinwa
- Mogbojuri
- Mahin
- Mahintedo
- Maran
- Matiminu
- Moferere
- Mogunyanje
- Motiala
- Motoro
- Odun Oloja
- Odun Oluma
- Odun Oroyo
- Odunmogun
- Ogorogo
- Ohaketa Camp
- Ojan
- Oke Etigho
- Okishilo
- Okoga
- Okunniyi
- Olosunmeta
- Opolo
- Orere - Ara
- Oribero
- Orimoloye
- Orioke Iwamimo
- Oriranyin
- Orofin Camp
- Oropo Zion
- Oroyomi
- Pete-Inu
- Piawo
- Ramasilo
- Seja Odo
- Seja Oke
- Seluwa
- Tedo Camp
- Tomoloju
- Tomoloju Camp
- Ugbaha
- Zion Gbabijo
- Zion Igbokoda
- Zion Mahintedo
- Zion Ogogoro

Etikan Kingdom

- Agba Gana
- Ago Apeja
- Ago Buli
- Ago Egun
- Ago Festus
- Ago Gbobaniyi
- Ago Ijebu
- Ago Ikumapayi
- Ago Iwabi
- Ago Lubi
- Ago Oluji
- Aiyetitun
- Araromi Etikan
- Igbobi
- Ikaji Etikan
- Moborode
- Obalende Etikan
- Ode Etikan
- Oja Igo Etikan
- Oja oje
- Oja Osho
- Oja Temidire
- Oke Harama
- Okonla
- Okun Eikan
- Ramasilo Etikan
- Uba Agba
- Uba Akobi
- Uba Domi
- Uba Etikan
- Uba Kalebari
- Uba Oke Kelian
- Uba Ropeda
- Uba Yellow

Aheri Kingdom

- Agbala Obi
- Agbala Olope Meji
- Agerige Town
- Agerige Zion
- Aheri Camp
- Ajebamidele
- Akata
- Ako Ira-Oba
- Araromi Sea-side
- Enu-Ama
- Ideghele
- Idigbengbin
- Igogun
- Ihapen
- Ilefunfun
- Ipepe
- Mofehintokun
- Okesiri
- Olopo
- Ramasilo
- Temidire
- Ubalogun
- Zion pepe

Igbotu

- Aboromeji
- Aboto Camp
- Ago
- Ago-Ogele
- Ago-Yellow
- Amayetigba
- Araromi
- Arigbe Camp
- Baale Camp
- Bisewe Golote
- Ebidlo
- Ekohebo Camp
- Enikorogha
- Epewe
- Eredase Camp
- Esenoko Camp
- Gbabijo
- Gunmagun Camp
- Hamidifa
- Idigba Camp
- Igbebomi Iyara
- Igbobini
- Igbolani-Arubenghan
- Igbotu
- Igbotu-Atijo
- Igbotu-Gbaluwe
- Igbotu-Zion
- Igirikile
- Imobi
- Itebetabe Camp
- Iyara
- Kafawe
- Kitikoro
- Kolodi Camp
- Kurugbene
- Lagereke
- Laporen Camp
- Lobele Camp
- Logede
- Lumoko Camp
- Moboro Village
- Odibo
- Ogbeni Camp
- Ogunmade
- Okoro
- Okorogbene
- Okuru Camp
- Olorunsola Camp
- Olowo Camp
- Oluagbo
- Omukoro Camp
- Onipanu Ago Bagi
- Onisosi
- Otarogbene Camp
- Pee Camp
- Pghono Camp
- Piria
- Shabomi Babomi
- Sogbo Camp
- Surulere
- Yogha
- Zion

=== Delta State ===
- Egbokuta
- Ago ila
- Ago kutu
- Ilesanmi
- Costain
- Ago Ilaje
- Surulere
- Agodo
- Ogo-Oluwayo
- Ogidigben seashore
- Ago Gboro

=== Ogun State ===
- Itebu Manuwa
- Ajegunle
- Ayetumara
- Igbo Edu
- Arijan
- Obinehin

=== Disputed (Ondo & Ogun) ===
- Irokun
- Eba
- Oke-Agor-Isekun

== Economy and Resources ==
=== Ilaje Deep Seaport, The Sunshine & Olokola FTZ ===
Plans are currently underway to construct a deep seaport complex in the Ilaje area of Ondo State which will comfortably handle large seafaring vessels. The Ondo state government is in active discussions with Backbone Infrastructure Nigeria LTD (BINL), and the project is on the cusp of breaking ground.

There are also plans to develop an economic logistics and exchange zone to be sited on an area of land measuring 2,771 hectares at Araromi Seaside and contiguous with the seaport complex. A beacon city and the Ilaje Industrial and utility zone. This new industrial ecosystem will serve the Nigerian import and export market, with the associated economic activities within the blue economy.

=== Ilaje Refinery ===
In November 2025, Backbone Infrastructure Limited signed a contract with the Ondo state Government and secured funding in excess of 50 billion dollars to build a 500,000 barrel per day petroleum refinery in an area covering some 1,471 hectares at Ogboti, Erunna, Ugbo Kingdom in the local government area. The funding was secured through the collaboration of two Canadian companies, NEFEX and BINL Holdings ltd, making the investment one of the largest single private sector investments in Nigeria's downstream petroleum and natural gas industry sector. According to the stake holders, the project will make Ondo state an emerging Nigerian industrial hub and a major hub for petroleum refining in the Niger Delta corridor. It will also position the state as a production center to meet local demand for refined products, provide feed stock for petro-allied industries, export refined products to the international market, and provide logistic facilities like docks, terminals, loading bays and an interconnected network of internal roads. The first phase of the project is scheduled for completion in 48 months (4 years).

=== Glass production ===
Oluwa Glass Company Plc was a glass making industry that operated out of Igbokoda. This industry made use of the abundant high quality silica sand found in various parts of the Local Government, which accounts for not less than 75% of the raw materials used for manufacturing glass sheets. The silica could be dug in large quantities in six major locations; Agerige, Akata, Atijere, Igbokoda, Zion Pepe, and Aboto. Presently, only the deposits at Igbokoda feeds the Oluwa Glass Factory. The Oluwa Glass Company has the potential to produce for both export and local consumption and the production should be a veritable source of inspiration to potential investors. Allied industries to the factory can also be established. The Oluwa Glass Company/Factory is now defunct.

=== Crude petroleum ===
Crude oil, which is the major source of income in Nigeria, is found in Ilaje Local Government. There are oil wells and fields spread all over the Local Government Area both onshore and offshore. Oil Companies such as Shell, Chevron, Texaco Nigeria Ltd, Consolidated Oil, Express Petroleum and Gas Company, Atlas Oil Company, Allied Energy Oil Company, Cavendish Oil Company, Esso-Mobil were at a times operational in the Local Government Area. Crude oil was first discovered at Araromi Sea-side in 1908 and later at Ogogoro in 1952 even before it was discovered at Oloibiri in the old Rivers State in 1956. Recently, several (about 14) disputed on shore Oil wells formerly credited to Delta state have been returned to Ondo State. They are as follows: Omuro, Ojumole, Malu, Eko, Parabe, Minna, Bella, Opuekeba, Obe, Esan, Ewa, Opolo, Opuama and Isekelewu oil fields.

=== Bitumen & Heavy oil ===
Bitumen mining, which has the potential to become one of the highest foreign exchange earners for Nigeria after Crude Oil is found in large quantities in Ilaje Local Government Area. Rich deposits can be obtained from areas like; Mahintedo, Igbo egunrin, Igbobi, Agerige, Araromi Seaside and a host of other communities. The Ondo South District of the state as a whole is host to an estimated 42 billion barrels of oil equivalent bitumen deposits.

=== Fishing terminal, Igbokoda ===
The foremost role played by Ilaje Local Government in national fish production has motivated the Federal Government to establish a multi million Naira terminal at Igbokoda, bearing in mind the abundant local experience, ready labour supply and direct access to the sea as well as various creeks and rivers, the terminal serves as an entrepot for fishing vessels. The fishing industry remains attractive to willing investors. It has been designed mainly for large scale fishing, but subsistence fishermen equally find it useful for storage purposes.

=== Boat-building industry ===
Apart from the boat yard at Igbokoda, the first dockyard was at Ayetoro and later Ori-oke Iwamimo, Olotu kuwo. A few other towns engage in boat building essentially through cooperative efforts. There is a high demand for boats and other motorized watercraft, since about 75% of the Local Government is riverine and not much of it is connected by road infrastructure. There is also need for improved technology in the business of boat building in order to boast productivity. This is a vacuum that could be filled by potential investors.

=== Other industries ===
Palm oil processing — There is large oil palm estate maintained in Ilaje Local Government Area. Besides, the wide spread of lands which abound in Mahin, Araromi, Ilumeje and Aheri Area of the Local Government is suitable for the existing oil mills and palm plantation and the fruits can be sourced from the estates.

Artisanal Brewing/Distillery (Ogogoro Production) —These businesses dot all parts of the Local Government because of the availability of the Palm wine bearing palm tree. However, improved mechanized distillery to boost large scale production on industrial alcohol is attainable. This orders a challenge to the world of investors.

Mat-weaving and Craft making — Raffia and canes, the basic raw materials for this industry are also sourced locally. Raffia Palms form the basis of the mat weaving in the entire Local Government, but the current level of mat making can be increased through the introduction of modern implements and techniques.

=== Raw materials ===
- Available raw materials obtainable in Ilaje includes; Water Hyacinth, available in large quantity and uses for production of fertilizer, insecticides such as mosquito coils, etc.,
- Livestock and Animal husbandry, such as poultry, piggery, cattle and associated products, i.e Eggs,
- Palm and palm products, i.e Palm fruits (for producing palm oil); Rafia palm (for building woven products), etc; Palm kernels and nuts (for producing pomades and soaps; Palm wine (for consumption); Coconut oil; Coconut fibre; Copra and other products.
- Timber and log wood for making planks, long fibre pulp for Newsprints and paper production.
- Other farm produce, including; cassava, rice, maize, okro, papaya, cashew, and vegetables, all of which have domestic and industrial purposes.

== Educational institutions ==
The Local Government Area has a total of 117 institutions of learning. This comprises 96 primary schools and 20 secondary schools and Technical Colleges.

== Tourism ==
Ilaje Local Government is a national tourist attraction with a shore line of about 180 km in Nigeria.

Numerous developments in water transportation and house construction on partially or completely flooded areas are also veritable tourist attraction. Lekki Peninsula in Lagos State to Ilaje Local Government along the Atlantic Coast is about 30 kilometres (19 mi) when proposes coastal road from Lagos is completed. On road, Igbokoda to Lagos is less than three hours drive through part of Benin. Shagamu and later Lagos Ibadan expressways. It is possible to supervise business in Igbokoda while resident in Lagos. Visitors to the main beach of the Local Government Headquarters (Igbokoda) reveals a sculpture of a fisherman. Also present at the main beach are hundreds of decorated ferry boats as though preparing for a boat race frusta.

Numerous cultural/traditional activities and mementos abound in the Local Government Area. For instance the Ayelala Shrine, which exist at a river junction called “Ita Ayelala”, is only a few kilometres from the Local Government Headquarters. Ayelala is a widely revered goddess because of her supposed ability to expose the sins or wrongdoings of people.

== Bibliography ==
- Obame, Cédric Ondo (18 December 2023). "Pêche maritime côtière et pêche continentale villageoise au Gabon : analyse comparée des processus techniques et investissements socioculturels, linguistiques et halieutiques". HAL Theses (in French). Institut National des Langues et Civilisations Orientales- INALCO PARIS - LANGUES O'.
