= Akoko =

Yoruba cultural sub-group in the Northeastern part of Yorubaland

Àkókó
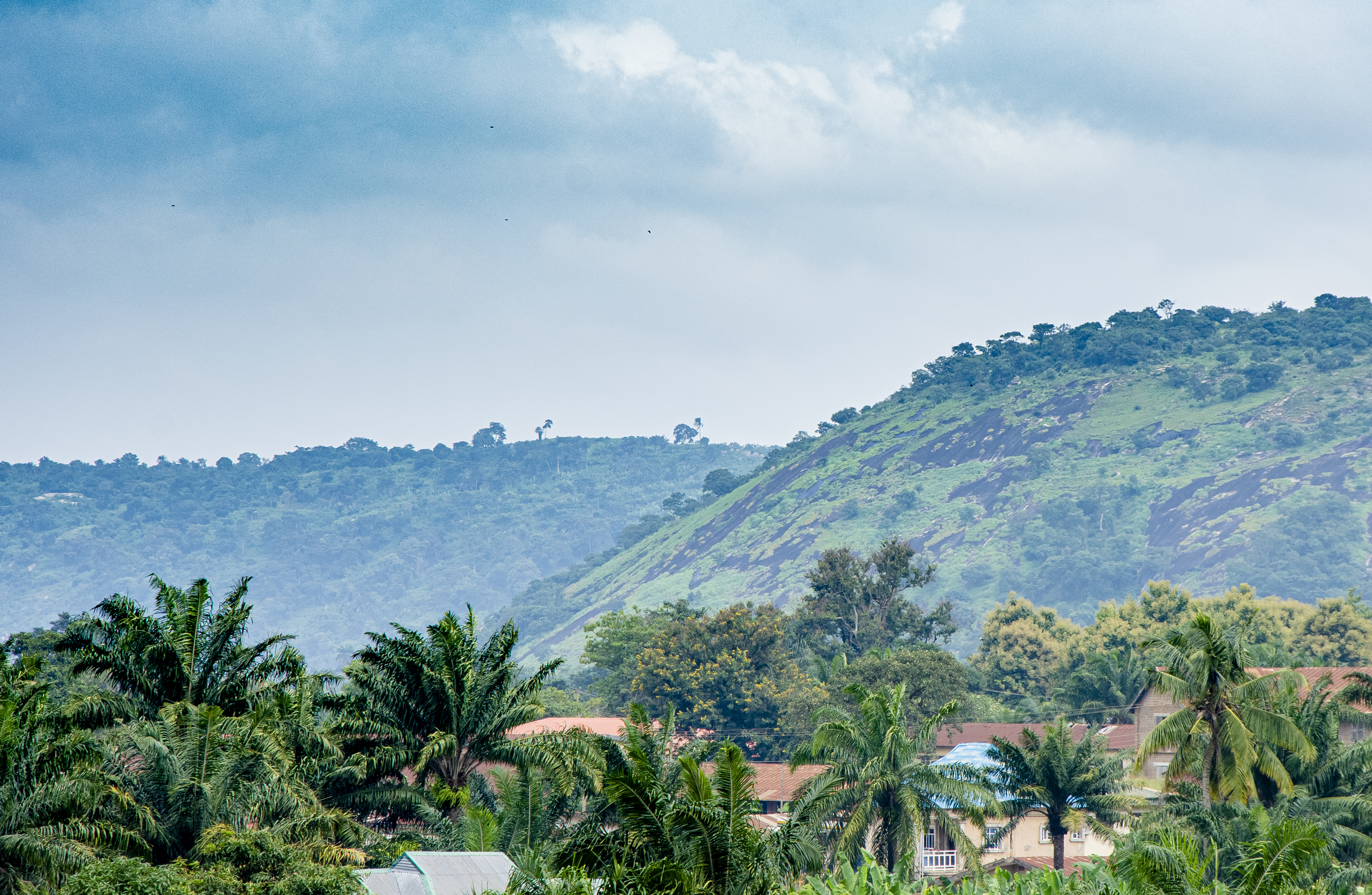
- Rockview in Ikare Akoko

Total population
- ~ 815,360 (2011)

Regions with significant populations
- Ondo State - 815,360 · Akoko North East: 208,080 · Akoko North West: 246,150 · Akoko South East: 95,790 · Akoko South West: 265,340

Languages
- Akoko languages · Akoko dialects of the Yoruba language

Religion
- Christianity · Yoruba religion · Islam

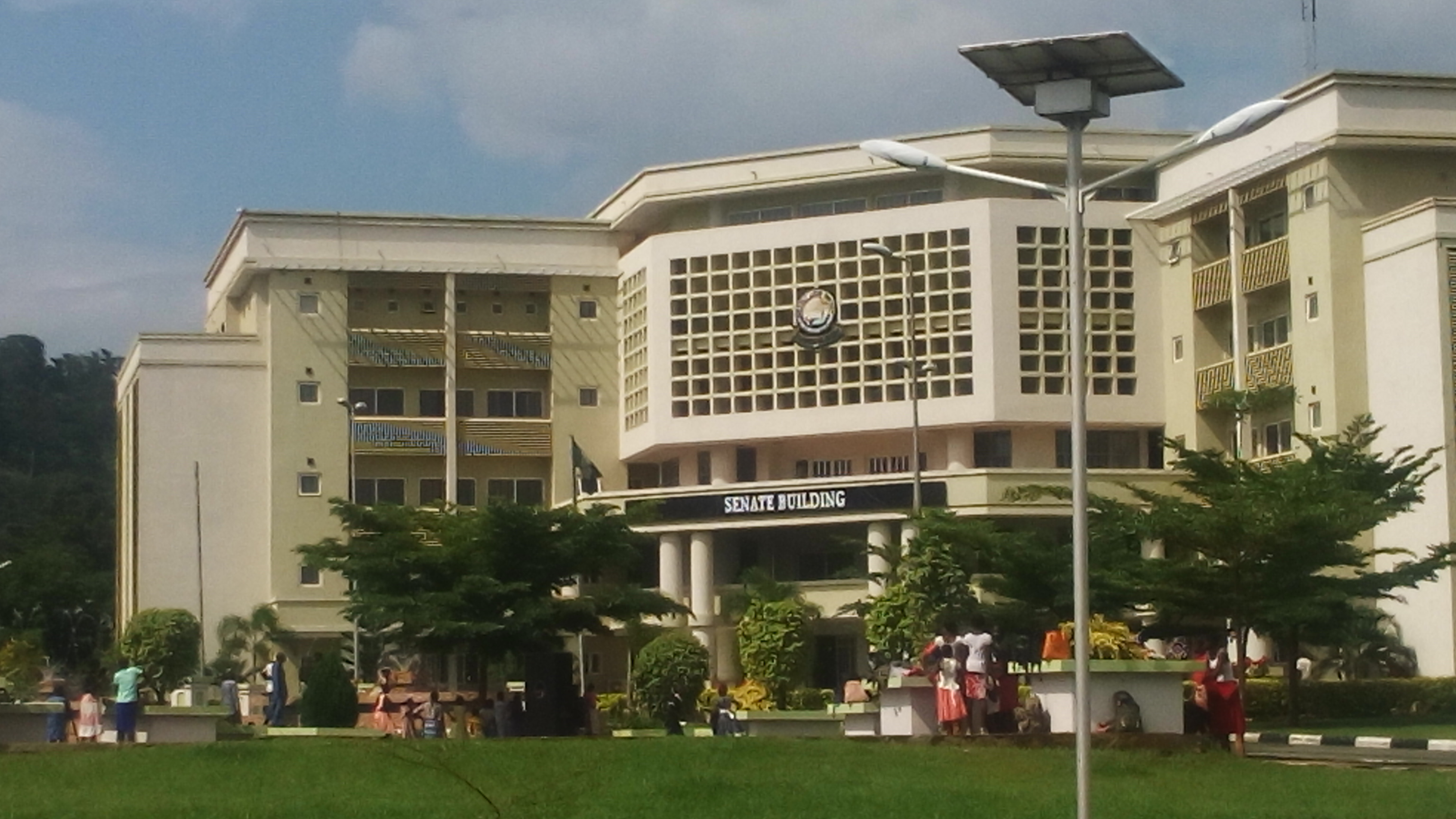
Adekunle Ajasin University, Akungba Akoko

The Akoko are a large Yoruba cultural sub-group in the northeastern part of Yorubaland, spanning from Ondo State to Edo State in southwest Nigeria. The Akokos as a subgroup make up 20.3% of the population of Ondo State, and 5.7% of the population of Edo State. Out of the present 18 Local Government Councils it constitutes four; Akoko North-East, Akoko North-West, Akoko South-East and Akoko South-West, as well as the Akoko Edo LGA of Edo State. The Adekunle Ajasin University, a state owned university with a capacity for about 20,000 tertiary education students and more than 50 departments in seven faculties is located in Akungba-Akoko. A state specialist hospital is situated at Ikare Akoko, while community general hospitals are located in Oka-Akoko, Irun-Akoko and Ipe-Akoko.

Arigidi, a dialect cluster, is spoken in the LGAs of Akoko North East, Akoko North West, Ekiti East, and Ijumu.

== Geography ==
Akoko comprises about 47 small towns and villages, predominantly situated in rocky outcrop areas of northern Ondo state. The rocky terrain nevertheless, may have helped the region to become a melting pot of sorts with different cultures coming from the north, eastern and southern Yoruba towns and beyond. Akoko became one of the few Yoruba clans with no distinctive local dialect. Major Akoko settlements include; Ọkà, Ikare, Oba, Ikun, Arigidi, Ugbe, Ogbagi, Okeagbe, Ikaram, Ibaram, Iyani, Akungba, Erusu, Ajowa, Akunu, Gedegede, Isua, Auga, Ikakumo, Supare, Epinmi, Ipe, Ifira, Ise, Iboropa, Irun, Ese, Iye, Afin, Igashi, Sosan, Ipesi, Etioro, Ayegunle, Eriti and Oyin. In addition to this group, there are several other autonomous communities of varying sizes.

The Akokos occupy a frontier zone of Yorubaland and are bound to the north by the Owé Okun Yorubas and the Ebira people, to the west by the Ekitis, to the south by the Owos and the Owan/Ora, and to the east by the Afemai groups.

- Ikare Akoko is the biggest city in the Akoko area with around 150,000 inhabitants as at 2008. It has an I.C.T resource centre where its people have the opportunity to connect to and communicate with other individuals across the country and around the world.
- Oka Akoko is the second largest city in Akokoland, with a population of 132,800. It is made up of 5 distinct settlements of Ayegunle-Oka, Oke-Oka, Iwaro-Oka, Okia-Oka and Isimerin-Oka. It is notable for the Oke-Maria Catholic Grotto, a popular tourist site.
- Irun-Akoko is one of the major towns in Akoko. It is made up of Surulere, Ugbouji, Ojeka, Utalefon, Kajola/Ejidu, Oyimo and Ugbooge distinct Settlements. The town is the gateway to Ekiti State as it is bounded by Iro-Ekiti and Isinbode-Ekiti to the North, Egbe-Ekiti, Imesi-Ekiti and Aisegba-Ekiti to the West and Emure-Ekiti to the South.
- Oba Akoko is another town in Akoko South West Local Government. Oba is the gateway to Akokoland as it is the first settlement encountered in a northward direction from the Owo community into the Akoko community.

== Culture and Lifestyle ==
The predominant traditional occupations of the community include large scale agriculture, trading and teaching. The Akoko and Ekiti Yorubas have a socio-cultural value concept known as Omoluka analogous to the general Yoruba concept of Omoluabi which summarises the ethos and virtues of the ideal Akoko man or woman a person's identity of integrity or uprightness. This concept has played a significant role in the indigenous integration, interaction and administration among the people.

== Climate ==
The climate at Akoko, which is 97.65 metres (320.37 feet) above sea level, is classified as tropical wet and dry or savanna (Aw). The district's average annual temperature is -0.69% lower than Nigeria's averages at 28.77 °C (83.79 °F). 233.37 millimetres (9.19 inches) of precipitation and 267.89 wet days (73.39% of the time) are Akoko's usual yearly precipitation totals.

== Towns and villages ==
Several mid sized towns and settlements pepper the Akoko landscape. This is a non-exhaustive list of them.

- Ikare District
  - Ikare
  - Ugbe
- Arigidi District
  - Arigidi
  - Iye
  - Agbaluku
  - Imo
  - Erusu
- Irun/Surulere District
  - Ese
  - Ugbouji
  - Irun
  - Utalefon
  - Kajola/Ejidu
  - Ogbagi
  - Ojeka
  - Suurulere
  - Ugbooge
- Oke Agbe District
  - Afa
  - Afin
  - Aje
  - Ase
  - Ido
  - Oke-Agbe
  - Iye
  - Oyin
- Ajowa District
  - Ajowa
  - Eriti
  - Gedegede
  - Igasi
- Akunnu/Isowopo District
  - Akunnu
  - Auga
  - Iboropa
  - Ikakumo
  - Ise
- Oka-Akoko District
  - Ayegunle-Oka
  - Iwaro-Oka
  - Oke-Oka
  - Okia-Oka
  - Simerin-Oka
- Epinmi -Akoko District
  - Epinmi-Akoko
- Isua Akoko District
  - Isua-Akoko
- Ipe Akoko District
  - Ipe-Akoko
- Akungba Akoko District
  - Akungba-Akoko
  - Eti oro
- Sosan Akoko District
  - Sosan-Akoko
- Ifira Akoko District
  - Ayegunle
  - Ifira
  - Ikun-Akoko
- Oba Akoko District
  - Ago Ajayi
  - Ago Ojo
  - Ago Oka
  - Ose-Oba
- Supare Akoko District
  - Abule Nla
  - Ago Flower
  - Ago Ori okuta
  - Igbo Eegun
  - Igbo Nla
- Ikaram District
  - Ikaram
  - Ibaram
  - Iyani
  - Ase

Ogbagi Akoko

== Notable people ==
Notable members of the Akoko clan include:

- Segun Abraham is a Nigerian politician and businessman.
- Adebayo Adefarati, 1931–2007, former governor of Ondo State
- Adejoro Adeogun, b. 1967 Member of the House of Representatives of Nigeria
- Olu Ajayi, a Nigerian professional artist, painter, cartoonist, and art reviewer, with over 40 years experience in studio practice and Art Administration
- Kayode Ajulo, politician, lawyer and civil rights activist
- Taiwo Akerele, a Nigerian policy economist, author, and politician
- Jones Oladehinde Arogbofa, b. 1952 former Chief of Staff to President Goodluck Jonathan, retired Nigerian Army Brigadier General.
- Bamidele Aturu, 1964–2014, a prominent lawyer and human right activist
- Prof Robert Ajayi Boroffice, Nigerian politician, scientist, and academic scholar, who served under former Gen. Olusegun Obasanjo. Made an Officer of the Order of the Niger (OON) in 2011.
- Bisayo Busari-Akinnadeju lawyer, politician and humanitarian
- Roy Chicago, d 1989, a highlife musician
- Sunday Ehindero, Inspector General of Police in Ondo State 2005-2007
- Omobayo Godwins, a Nigerian politician and deputy governor of Edo State in 2024
- TB Joshua, 1963–2021, of The Synagogue, Church of All Nations
- Adetokunbo Kayode, former Minister of Justice and Attorney General of the Federation, Chairman Gemstones Miners and Marketers Association of Nigeria
- Olugbenga Omole, Member of Ondo State House of Assembly
- Joseph Oladele Sanusi, former governor, Central Bank of Nigeria
- Moses Orimolade Tunolase, Founder of the first African initiated church, the Eternal Sacred Order of the Cherubim and Seraphim

== Gallery ==
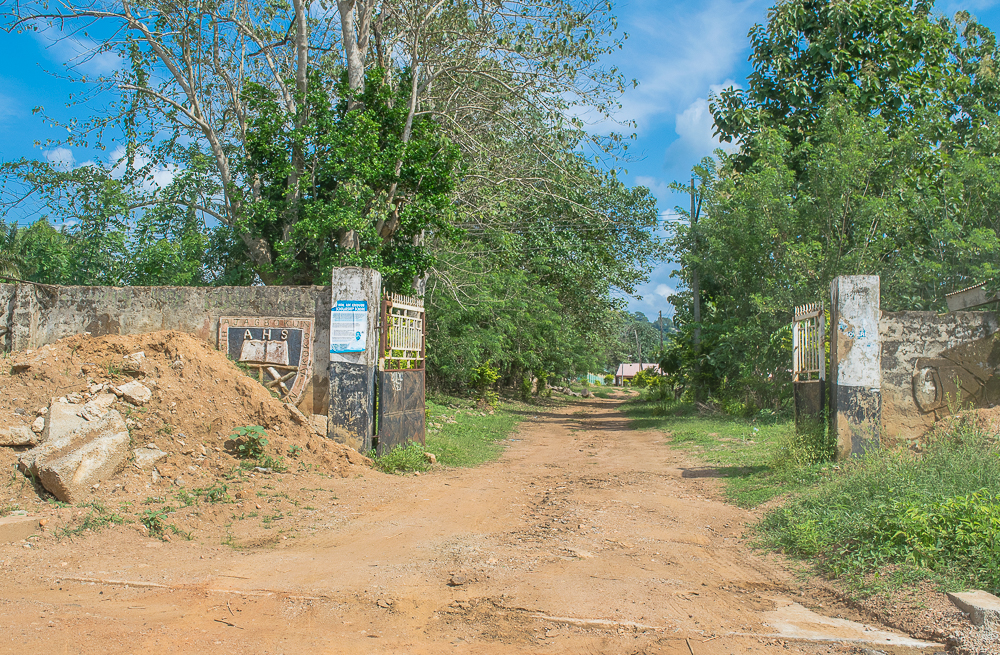
