= Emmanuel Bayode Ajulo =

Anglican bishop in Nigeria

Emmanuel Bayode Ajulo (born 26 September 1947) served as the first Anglican Bishop of Okene in Lokoja Province of the Church of Nigeria from 2008 until his retirement in 2017.

He was born in Lampese (now Edo State), and attended the Anglican Grammar School Igarra from 1962 until 1966.

He holds a BA in English (1973) and an MA (English Studies) in 1978 from the University of Ife and a PhD (English Language) from the University of Sheffield, England (1980). Ajulo has held posts in the following universities: Ambrose Alli, Ahmadu Bello, and the University of Jos (where he became Professor in 1995).

He was made Pioneer Bishop, Anglican Diocese of Okene in 2008 and was succeeded by Emmanuel Onsachi on his retirement in 2017.

He has written an autobiography: The Child Of His Mercy.
