= Adegboyega Adefarati =

Nigerian politician

Federal Representative
- Preceded by: Adejoro Adeogun
- Constituency: Akoko South East/Akoko South West

Personal details
- Party: All Progressives Congress (APC)
- Occupation: Politician

Adefarati Adegboyega Adeyemi is a Nigerian politician. He currently serves as a member of the House of Representatives, representing Akoko South East/Akoko South West Federal Constituency of Ondo State in the 10th National Assembly. He succeeded Adejoro Adeogun.
