= Seinde Arogbofa =

Nigerian author and politician

Bashorun Seinde Arogbofa OFR
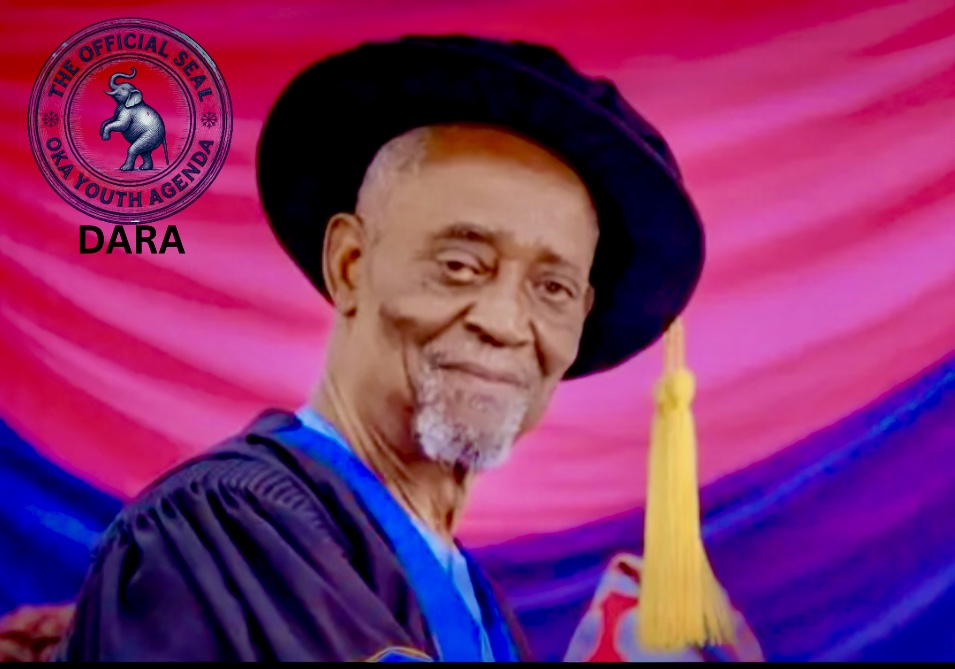
- Seinde receiving an award from ANA.
- Born: Seinde Arogbofa; 23 March 1939 (age 87); Oka-Akoko, Ondo State, Nigeria
- Occupations: author, politician
- Known for: Former Secretary-General of Afenifere
- Notable work: Wives and Mothers (1989); Nigeria: The Path We Refused to Take (2017)
- Title: Bashorun and Asiwaju of Oka-Akoko
- Spouse: Chief Mrs Elizabeth Arogbofa (m. 1946; died 2023)
- Relatives: Jones Arogbofa (brother)
- Awards: Order of the Federal Republic (OFR)

Seinde Arogbofa ( (born 23 March 1939) is a Nigerian author who was the Secretary General of the Afenifere His younger brother was General Oladeinde Jones Arogbofa, who was Chief of Staff of the Federal Republic of Nigeria.

== Early life ==
Arogbofa was born in Oka-Akoko, a town in Akoko South-West Local Government Area of Ondo State, southwestern Nigeria. Both his late wife, Oluwakemi Elizabeth Arogbofa, and his deceased brother, Jones Arogbofa, were laid to rest in the same town. He received his secondary education at Victory College, Ikare, where he obtained the West Africa School Certification. He then attended the University of Ibadan. Arogbofa was recognized by late Governor Rotimi Akeredolu of Ondo State for his contributions as one of the living heroes who fought for the creation of Ondo State.

== Political career ==
He began his political career as a member of the Alliance for Democracy before he later joined the Afenifere socio-cultural organization and became her Secretary General. In the 2023 Ondo State political crisis he intervened and resolved to end the conflict between the late Governor Oluwarotimi Akeredolu and his Deputy, Lucky Aiyedatiwa.

== Honours and awards ==
Honour/Award	Notes
Asiwaju Oka-Akoko	Traditional chieftaincy title
Monograph Honouree	Recognized by the ANA, Ondo State Chapter
Order of the Federal Republic (OFR)	Awarded by President Goodluck Jonathan for contributions to education and literature
Ondo State Hall of Fame	Inducted for exceptional contributions to the state

== Notable work ==
Basorun Seinde Arogbofa has authored several books, including:
Year	Title
1983	Trapped (1983)
1985	Agidi sours: Discipline on trial (1985)
1988	The socialite (1988)
1989	Wives and Mothers (1989)
2017	Nigeria: The Path We Refused to Take (2017)
2019	To The Stars Through Bows And Arrows (Ad Astra Per Ardua) (2019)
