= Adejoro Adeogun =

Nigerian politician (born 1967)

Hon. Adejoro Adeogun

Member of the House of Representatives of Nigeria from Ondo
- In office 11 June 2019 – 11 June 2023
- Succeeded by: Adegboyega Adefarati
- Constituency: Akoko South East/Akoko South West

Personal details
- Born: 23 June 1967 (age 59) Oba Akoko, Western State (now in Ondo State), Nigeria
- Party: All Progressives Congress
- Occupation: Politician

Adejoro Adeogun (born 23 June 1967) is a Nigerian politician. He was a member of the House of Representatives of Nigeria, representing Akoko South East/Akoko South West Federal Constituency of Ondo State in the 9th National Assembly. He was succeeded by Adegboyega Adefarati.

== Education ==
Adeogun received his undergraduate degree at University of Ibadan in 1989. He furthered at United States Merchant Marine Academy where he earned a post diploma in Maritime Security Management and a Master of Business Administration from University of Manchester's Alliance Manchester Business School.

== Career ==
=== Pre-politics ===
After graduating from the university, Adeogun worked as an intelligence analyst, principal staff officer and training manager at the Department of State Services in 1990. He worked as a managing director of a commercial real estate company—Magnum & Hunter Limited. Adeogun is the founder of Brentonwoods and Trinity Leadership Foundation; a non-governmental organisation that empowers youths.

=== Politics ===
From 2007 to 2011, he worked as a special adviser to the Government of Rivers State on Special Duties where he initiated the inauguration of Command Control Computer Communications and Intelligence Center (C4i) to aid security agencies in the state and was also the chief security of Governor Peter Odili from 1999 to 2004. As the managing director of Rivers State Waste Management Agency, he introduced the waste monitoring system which helped curb waste in Rivers State.

In 2019, Adeogun was elected a member of the House of Representatives to represent Akoko South East/South West Federal Constituency. He was the deputy chairman of the House Committee on National Security and Intelligence and also as the chairman of an Ad Hoc Committee which investigated how recovered loots are used.
