= Somorika =

Place in Edo State, Nigeria

Somorika (formerly known as Avo) is a town located about five kilometres North-East of Igarra in the Akoko Edo Local Government Area of Edo State, Nigeria.

== Description ==
The town speaks Okpameri Language. The town is divided into three quarters which are;

1. Oyinokara

2. Igoni

3. Oyenovo

The community has a shrine called Ulokuaigbe Shrine that was established in 1955 to solve spiritual problems of the indigenes and strangers. The major doctrine preached in the shrine is the principle of “love your neighbour as yourself and do unto others as you want others do to you”. People travel from all over the world to seek the town’s ancestral powers. To get to the town you have to climb seven hills. The community has a lot of histories, mysteries and work of art which are not man-made. There are basic seven age grades in the somorika community and they are; Isisiboto, Isiri, Ekuefe, Iposha, Ekualeburu, Ekuopa, Ibiase. The village head is known as the Imah of Somorika.

== History ==
According to oral tradition, Somorikans are said to be the warriors of Benin who pulled out from the military assignment at the era of Oba Ewuare of Benin kingdom. The leader of the warrior is reported to be a native of usilowa quarters of the benin kingdom. According to history, Somorika, Ogbe, Onumu have a common ancestors from immigrants from Benin. They settled together at Idah and later settled at Egay near Okene and then at the west of Ibillo and now they are no longer existing. They moved to their permanent sites.

== Tourism ==
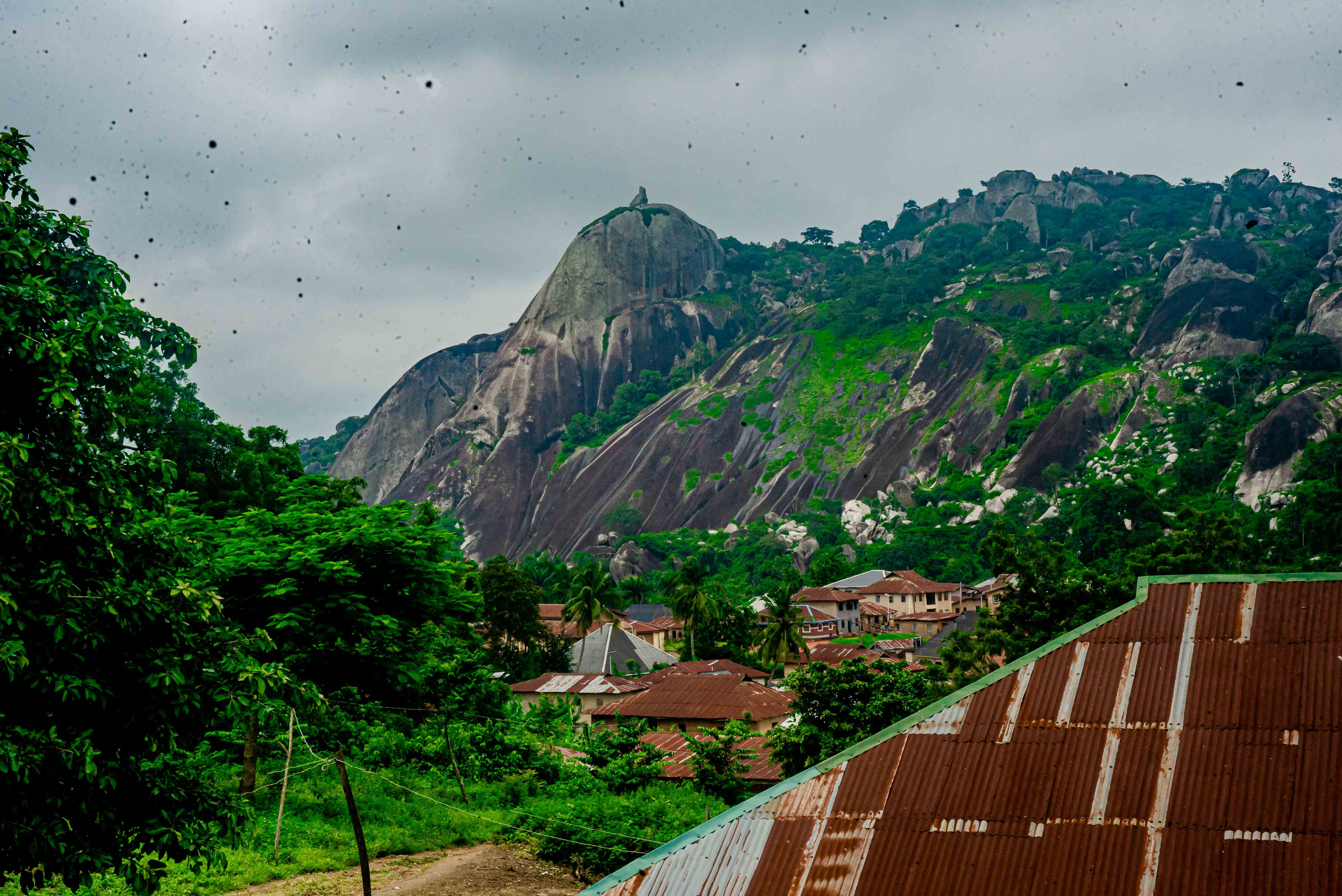
One of Somorika's hills

This community has a lot of rocks that are as high as 1700 feet. One of such is the Oriakpe rock (the big rock that has a human shaped rock on top of it). Another well known rock is the Odeburu rock which is reported to be the highest pinnacle of the kukuruku hills. The pinnacle can be seen from nearby town and villages even as far as Auchi. During the colonial era, Somorika served as relaxation and vacation spots for the British officers and their families. The community has a lot of cultural festivals. Another is the Iresha spring which flows as deep as 50 feet, the water is very chilly and forms ice in extreme temperature. They have other rocks and caves which serve as a defence to the somorikans.
