= Ikare =

Town in Ondo State, Nigeria

Ikare-Akoko Ùkàrẹ́
- town
- Motto: omo olókè méjì tako tabo
- Location within Nigeria
- Coordinates: 7°31′N 5°45′E
- Country: Nigeria
- State: Ondo
- LGA: Akoko North-East
- Demonym: omo Ikare
- Time zone: UTC+1:00 (WAT)

Ikare is a city in the northern senatorial part of Ondo State, Nigeria.

Ìkàré-Àkókó (Ikare for short), city in southwestern Nigeria, is located in the Northern Senatorial District of Ondo State. Ikare is about 100 km from Akure, the Ondo State capital. The city was the divisional headquarters of the old Akoko Division, comprising Oka-Akoko, Isua-Akoko, Okeagbe-Akoko, Ugbe Akoko etc. Based on the Local Government System now practised in Nigeria, the city is currently the headquarters of Akoko North-East Local Government. The city is a trading area for farmers of Kolanut, Cocoa, and coffee.

A short introductory expose of Ikare Akoko in Ùkàrẹ́ dialect by a native speaker

Ikare shares boundaries with Arigidi, Ugbe Akoko, Ogbagi, Oka, Akungba and Supare Akoko .

Osele market is the Ikare's biggest communal market where the city's ancient traditions are displayed, Ikare-Akoko. Oja Oba is situated in opposite old first Bank, garage Ikare akoko. The city is located in the Yoruba cultural region and has a substantial Christian, Jehovah Witness and Muslim population with several Churches, worshiping halls and Mosques. The architectural style of the city incorporates both Portuguese and Arabic styles. The Portuguese style was introduced in the 16th century when Portugal began to export slaves from the region. Arabic influences were incorporated in the 19th century with the diffusion of Islamic culture Southward across the Sahara.Population as of 2006 was over 700,000.

== Climate ==
In Ikare, the hot, muggy, partly cloudy dry season contrasts with the warm, oppressive, and cloudy wet season. It seldom drops below 57 °F or rises above 95 °F throughout the year; instead, it usually ranges from 63 °F to 90 °F.

With an average daily high temperature of 88 °F, the hot season spans 2.5 months, from January 23 to April 7. At an average high temperature of 89 °F and low temperature of 71 °F, March is the hottest month of the year in Ikare.

The average daily high temperature during the 4.1-month cool season, which runs from June 16 to October 19, is below 82 °F. August is the coldest month of the year in Ikare, with an average high temperature of 80 °F and low temperature of 68 °F.

=== Rainfall ===
There is at least 13 millimetres (0.5 inches) of rain in a sliding 31-day period throughout the 9.1-month rainy season, which runs from February 14 to November 18. September has an average of 200 millimetres (7.9 inches) of rain, making it the wettest month in Ikare.

The 2.9-month dry spell that occurs every year spans from November 18 to February 14. December is the month with the least amount of rain in Ikare, with an average of 5.1 millimetres (0.2 inches).

== See also ==
- Akungba
- Oka Akoko
- Akoko
