= Aliu Omokide =

Nigerian politician

Member of Bendel State House of Assembly
- Constituency: Akoko Edo South

Personal details
- Born: 29 December 1933
- Died: February 2021 (aged 87)
- Occupation: Politician

Aliu Omokide (born 29 December 1933 – February 2021) was a Nigerian politician who served as a member of the defunct Bendel State House of Assembly from 1979 to 1983. He represented the Akoko Edo South Constituency during his tenure. Omokide died in February 2021 at the age of 87.
