= ABA Festival, Igarra =

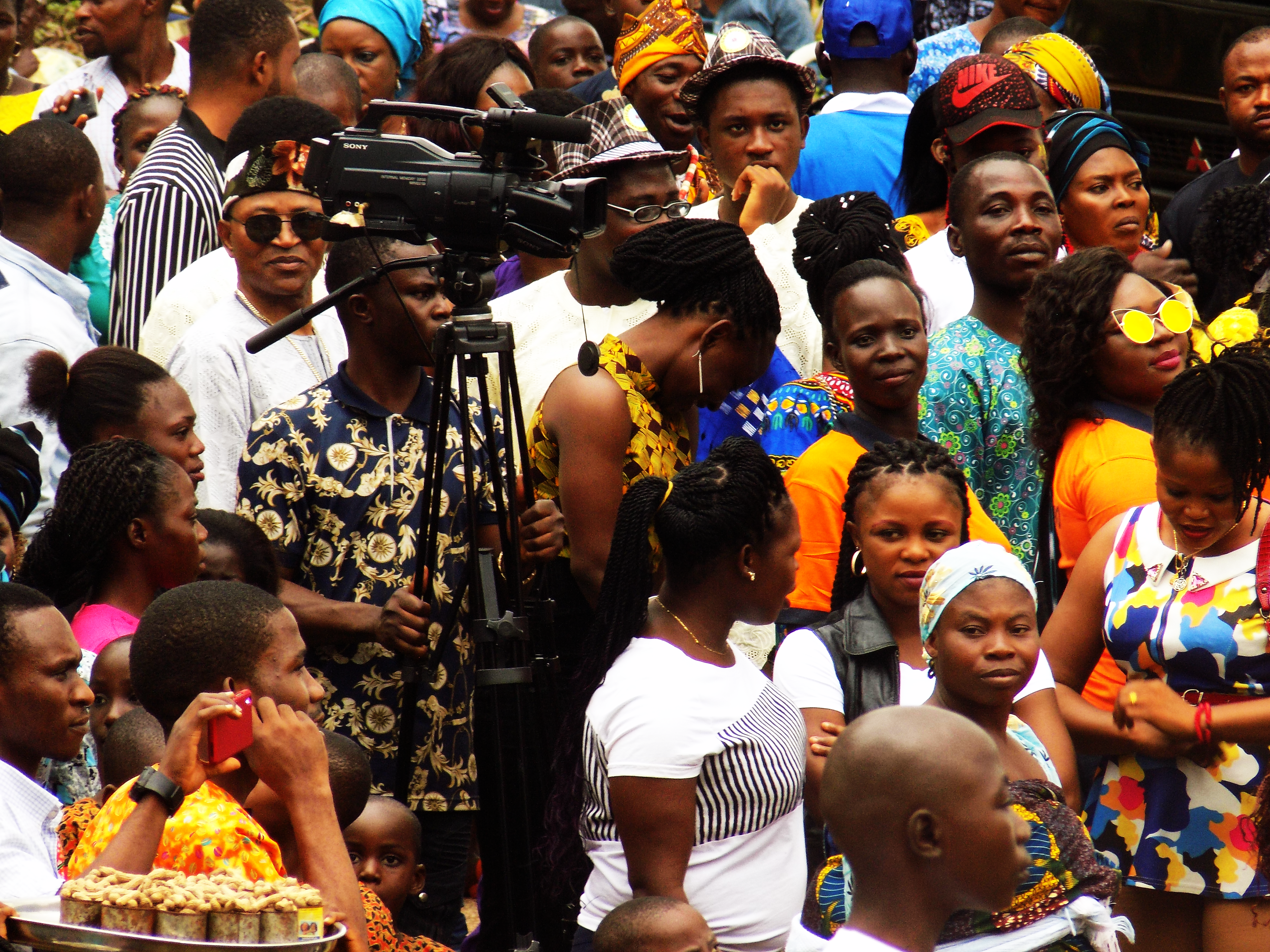
- Working as media crew
- Date: Six years
- Location: Edo State
- Country: Nigeria
- Inaugurated: 1789
- Major events: Marking victory by Hunters

ABA Festival, Igarra is a festival held every seven years in Igarra land, Akoko Edo Local Government Area of Edo State, Nigeria, West Africa. The festival is celebrated by the Igarra people and its origin can be traced to as far back as 1789.The festival is celebrated to mark the victory by the hunters over the initial settlers of the land now known and described as Igarra-Etuno.

The name ABA Festival is derived from the popular ABA drum associated with the Kwararafa in (Jukun kingdom).

== Festival Rating ==
In 2006, the festival was rated as the sixth most indigenous cultural festival in West Africa by Total E & P. The festival is listed by the National Council for Arts and Culture (NCAC) as a notable festival in Nigeria.
