= Olugbenga Omole =

Nigerian politician

Akogun Olugbenga Akinola Omole

Member Ondo State House of Assembly
- In office 2019–2023
- Constituency: Akoko South-West Constituency I

Personal details
- Born: 30 April 1972 (age 54) Oka Akoko, Ondo State, Nigeria
- Party: All Progressives Congress (APC)
- Relations: Married
- Education: University of Ilorin
- Occupation: Legislator, businessman, football administrator and farmer

Akogun Olugbenga Akinola Omole (born 30 April 1972 in Oka Akoko, Ondo State) is a Nigerian politician, legislator, football administrator and farmer. He is the chairman of Akogun Farms Nigeria Limited and currently serves as special adviser on transport to the governor of Ondo State.

== Early life and education ==
Olugbenga Omole attended Saint John's & Mary Demonstration Primary School, Owo, from 1977 to 1983, and Owo High School, Owo, from 1983 to 1988. He went to the Federal School of Arts and Science, Ondo for his higher school certificate from 1989 to 1991. He obtained his bachelor's degree in geography from the University of Ilorin in 1997. Omole also attended Adekunle Ajasin University in Akungba Akoko, where he earned a master's degree in public administration. In June 2024, he was awarded an honorary doctorate in Public Policy and Administration by Prowess University, Delaware.

== Business and personal life ==
A football administrator and political tactician, Omole has been a member of Campaign for Democracy since 1995 and a member Committee for the Defence of Human Rights since 1995. He is a foundation member of Ondo State Youth in Politics and the Action Congress of Nigeria, which later metamorphosed into the All Progressives Congress.

Prior to his emergence as the candidate of his party, All Progressives Congress, for House Assembly Akoko South West Constituency 1 Oka, Omole was appointed education secretary for Akoko South West in October 2017 by Ondo State Governor Arakunrin Oluwarotimi Akeredolu SAN. Under his purview, over 50 different projects in 17 public primary schools were executed. 90% of these projects were completed before he resigned to contest in the House of Assembly primary. He eventually won the general election with a landslide victory in March 2019.

He collaborated with an Indian and a United Nation awardee Urmila Chanam, a global expert in menstrual hygiene and founder of Breaking the Silence, by organizing workshops in various secondary schools in Ondo State focusing on girls. Omole is the chief executive officer of Hero Communication and Events Management company as well as Akogun Farms Nigeria Limited.

In March 2026, Omole was appointed a member of the Nigerian Football Federation Electoral Committee.

== Political career ==
In his early political career, Omole was appointed personal assistant to the former governor of Ondo State Chief Adebayo Adefarati in charge of Youth and Union Matters from 2001 to 2003. He was later handed a higher responsibility at the Ondo State Football Agency as a camp commandant and welfare officer of Sunshine Stars Football Club between September 2009 and December 2011, when the Ondo State team got a continental ticket for the first time.

Omole served as the chairman of the Youth Directorate of Buhari/Osinbajo Campaign Organization in Ondo State in 2015 and later as the coordinator of Arakunrin Rotimi Akeredolu 2016 governorship election campaign organization in Akoko South West Local Government. He was also a founding member of Action Congress of Nigeria, which later metamorphosed into the All Progressives Congress. He was elected as a member of Ondo State House of Assembly representing Akoko South West Constituency I under the All Progressive Congress in 2019.

In 2024, Omole was appointed special adviser on information and strategy to the Governor of Ondo State, Lucky Orimisan Aiyedatiwa, and was subsequently appointed special adviser on transport in November 2025.

== Awards ==
- Winner of 2019 Ondo State Legislator of the Year and Emerging Leader of the Year
- Award of Excellence by Akure Topaz Lions Club
- Trace Magazine's Grassroots Developments Award 2018
- Commander of Christian Faith African Church, Oka Akoko Diocese
- Outstanding Man of the Year 2020 by Chronicle Magazine, Award of Excellence by NUT Akoko South West Local Government Chapter
- Ondo State Leadership Award as Legislator of the Year 2019 by Hero Magazine
