= Taofik Abdulsalam =

Taofik Olawale Abdulsalam
- Occupations: lawyer, politician and public official
- Known for: Federal Commissioner of Code of Conduct Bureau

Taofik Olawale Abdulsalam is a Nigerian lawyer, politician and public official currently serving as a Federal Commissioner of Code of Conduct Bureau (CCB) representing the South West appointed by President Muhammadu Buhari in 2023. He previously served as speaker of the Ondo State House of Assembly.

== Career ==
Abdulsalam practiced as a lawyer before joining politics in 2007 when he contested and won Akoko North-East constituency seat in the Ondo State House of Assembly on the platform of Action Congress (AC) party. He was elected speaker of the house in 2008 and served until April 2010, when he was controversially impeached due to internal crisis in the house. Following the impeachment, 11 lawmakers loyal to Abdulsalam boycotted parliamentary sessions for a long time stalling legislative activities of the assembly in protest against his impeachment.

In March 2017, Governor of Ondo State, Rotimi Akeredolu appointed Abdulsalam as his special assistant on legislative matters liaising between the executive and the state parliament. He was appointed to the Code of Conduct Bureau as a Federal Commissioner representing the South West Zone by President Muhammadu Buhari in January 2023 and was confirmed by the Nigerian Senate on 28 February 2023.

At the CCB he advocates against “media trial” of persons under investigation to preserve institutional integrity and supports digitization of Assets and Liabilities Declaration System (ALDS) from manual to online filing.
