= Isua =

Isua may refer to:

- Isua Greenstone Belt, a Greenlandic greenstone belt
- Isua Iron Mine, a proposed open-pit iron mine
- Isua-Akoko, a small town in Ondo State
