= Ibillo =

Town in Edo State, Nigeria

Ibillo is one of the largest town situated in the Akoko-Edo local government area in Edo State in Nigeria. Ibillo is surrounded by several neighboring towns/villages including Ikiran Oke, Imoga, Ekpesa and Lampese which are all part of the twenty two communities said to make up the Okpameri group, all within the Akoko Edo local government area with the LGA headquarters in Igarra. Ibillo is made up of four quarters Ekuayo, Uwhosi/Illese, Uzeh/Ekumah and Eku/Odo.

== History ==
Very little is documented about the origin of the people of Ibillo, but, in oral tradition, it is believed that the people migrated from Benin kingdom. The people engage in such occupations as farming, trading, wood processing and pottery. The land is fertile and she has a large market relative to other Akoko-Edo communities. The market is located along Ibillo – Abuja express way. Ibillo is also a host community for Federal Government College one of the Unity colleges by the Federal Government of Nigeria. The community has produced prominent individuals including Mitchel Elegbe the founder of Interswitch, Late Archbishop Albert Agbaje, Late Ven. Fred Ade Garuba and many others across sectors. Ibillo has four quarters and rulership is rotated among those quarters.
