= Olu Ajayi =

Nigerian painter, cartoonist, and art reviewer (born 1963)

- Born: August 18, 1963; Ososo, Edo State, Nigeria
- Died: May 23, 2025 (aged 61); Lagos, Nigeria
- Occupations: Professional artist, painter, cartoonist, and art reviewer
- Years active: 40

Olu Ajayi (18 August 1963 - 23 May 2025) was a Nigerian professional artist, painter, cartoonist, and art reviewer, with over 40 years experience in studio practice and Art Administration. He was a chairman of the Society of Nigerian Artists, Lagos State chapter and a trustee of the Guild of Professional Artists of Nigeria (GFA). Olu Ajayi was also a board member of the Visual Art Society of Nigeria (VASON), and a Fellow of the Society of Nigerian Artists. He was listed in the Who is Who in Art compendium, as well as being honoured as a Top 100 Artist.

During his career he held exhibitions in Nigeria, South Africa, USA, UK, Canada, and other European countries. He also sold his art in Burnham's Auction House.

== Early life ==
Olu was born on 18 August 1963 and was a native of Ososo, in Akoko Edo LGA of Edo State. He graduated from the Auchi Polytechnic in 1984 with a HND in Fine Arts. Olu Ajayi illustrated Xanti by Neville Ukoli, and the Aboki Comic Strip of Defunct The Sunday Observer Newspapers. He was also the in-house cartoonist of Defunct The Nigerian Observer Newspapers.

== Career ==
Olu Ajayi was one of the early pioneers of water colour paintings in Nigeria. After becoming a member of the Society of Nigerian Artists (SNA), he rose to become the President of the Lagos Chapter between 2008 – 2014 and instituted the October Rain and Art Café events that marks SNA's yearly programmes. He was also the founding member of the Guild of Professional Fine Artists and his works had been commissioned work for several institutions including commercial banks, churches, galleries and blue-chip companies.

His works had been exhibited in Nigeria, Africa and Europe and served as a consultant across local and international art platforms. He has reviewed Funnso Ogunlade's "A Promise of Harvest”, Humphrey Bekaren's "A New Pride”, Abraham Ogbodo's "Painting a New Order", Chinwe Uwatse's "A Blaze of Colour", and "Eccentric Paintings" by the Sunday Times Newspapers, Lagos.

== Style ==
Olu Ajayi was inspired by the 1980s art scene, Adolph Frederick Reinhardt and Salvador Dalí. He preferred working on female forms using bold colors representing pseudo human figures caught in candid positions.

== Notable work ==
Market by the Palace (1999) an oil on canvas painting was his highest grossing exhibited work sold at Arthouse Contemporary Limited in 2008.

== Death ==
Olu Ajayi died on 23 May 2025 at St. Nicholas Hospital in Lagos, Nigeria.
