= TB Joshua =

Nigerian Christian leader (1963–2021)

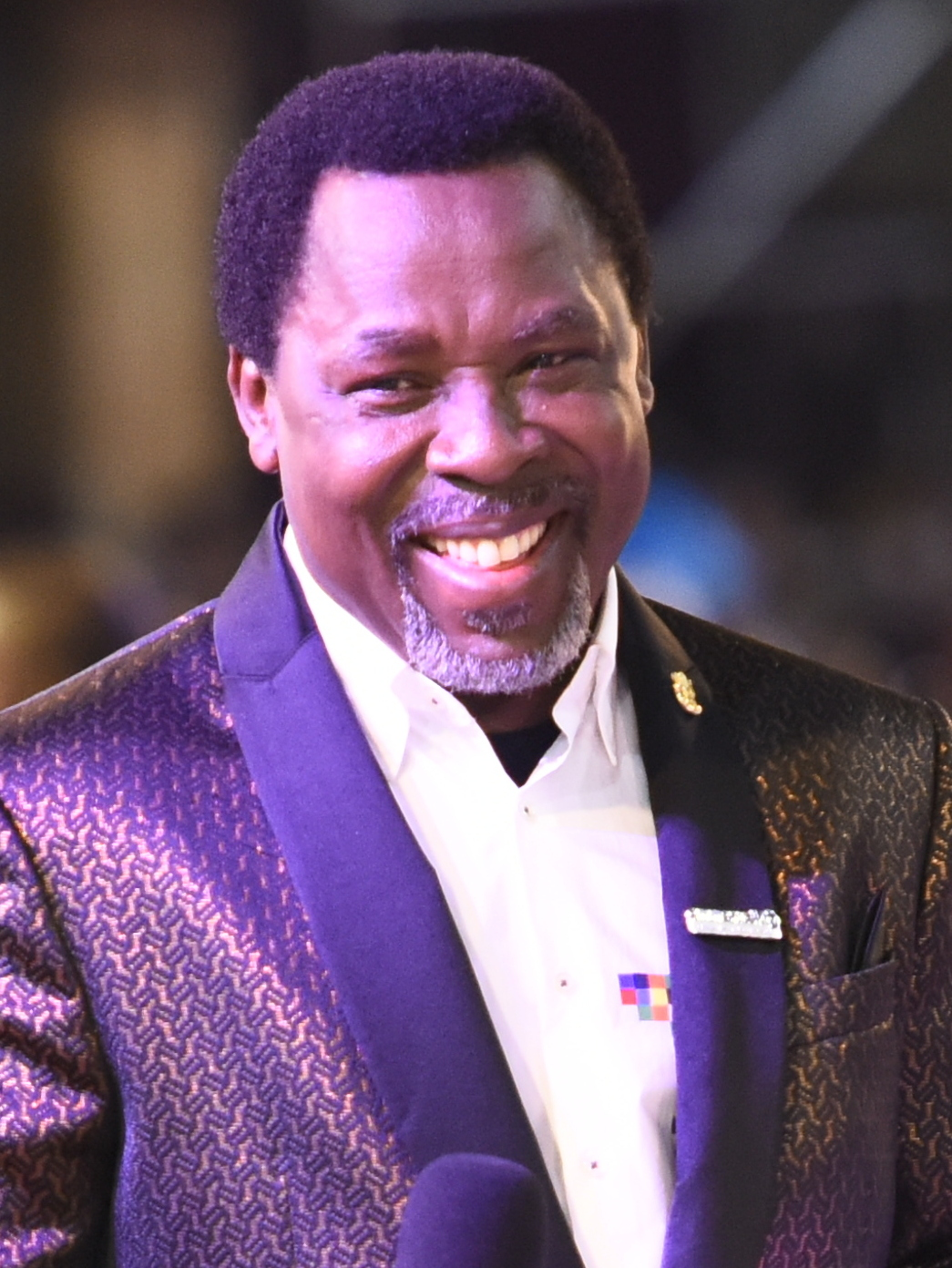
- Joshua in 2014
- Born: Temitope Balogun Joshua; 12 June 1963; Arigidi Akoko, Nigeria
- Died: 5 June 2021 (aged 57); Lagos, Nigeria
- Occupations: Charismatic pastor; televangelist; philanthropist
- Spouse: Evelyn Joshua
- Children: 3
- Website: The Synagogue, Church Of All Nations, Emmanuel TV

Temitope Balogun Joshua (12 June 1963 – 5 June 2021) was a Nigerian charismatic pastor and televangelist. He was the leader and founder of Synagogue Church of All Nations (SCOAN), a Christian megachurch that runs the Emmanuel TV television station from Lagos, Nigeria.

Joshua was widely known across Africa and Latin America and had a large social media presence with over six million fans on Facebook. His YouTube channel, Emmanuel TV, had over one million subscribers and was the most-viewed Christian ministry on the platform before the channel was suspended by YouTube in 2021 for alleged homophobic hate speech. Joshua was described by media outlets as the "Oprah of Evangelism" and "YouTube's most popular pastor".

Joshua was awarded various accolades, notably receiving the Officer of the Order of the Federal Republic (OFR) by the Nigerian government in 2008 and being voted the Yoruba man of the decade by Pan-Yoruba media outlet Irohin-Odua. He was called one of Africa's 50 most influential people by Pan-African magazines The Africa Report and New African Magazine. By 2011, according to Forbes, Joshua was Nigeria's third-richest pastor, although the claim was immediately denied in a statement by the church.

Joshua was a prominent public figure throughout his life, known for both his religious outreach and humanitarian works, as well as controversies, including being blacklisted by the government of Cameroon in 2010. He died on 5 June 2021 after one of his evening services in Lagos, Nigeria, just one week prior to his 58th birthday. A BBC investigation in 2024 reported various abuses by Joshua and the Church.

== Early life and work ==
Joshua was born on 12 June 1963, as Temitope Balogun Joshua. Joshua's home town was Arigidi Akoko, Ondo State. He claimed that miracles accompanied his birth, and that he spent 15 months in his mother's womb. He claimed that his birth had been "prophesied" a century earlier.

Born into poverty, Joshua's Yoruba family included both Muslims and Christians. He grew up with a Muslim uncle after his father, a Christian, died. According to SCOAN, the church he founded, he attended the St. Stephen's Anglican Primary School in Arigidi Akoko, Nigeria, between 1971 and 1977. After a year of secondary school education, he left to work on a poultry farm.

In school, he was known as "small pastor" because of his love for the Bible. Joshua attempted to join the Nigerian military but was thwarted due to a train breakdown that left him stranded en route to the military academy.

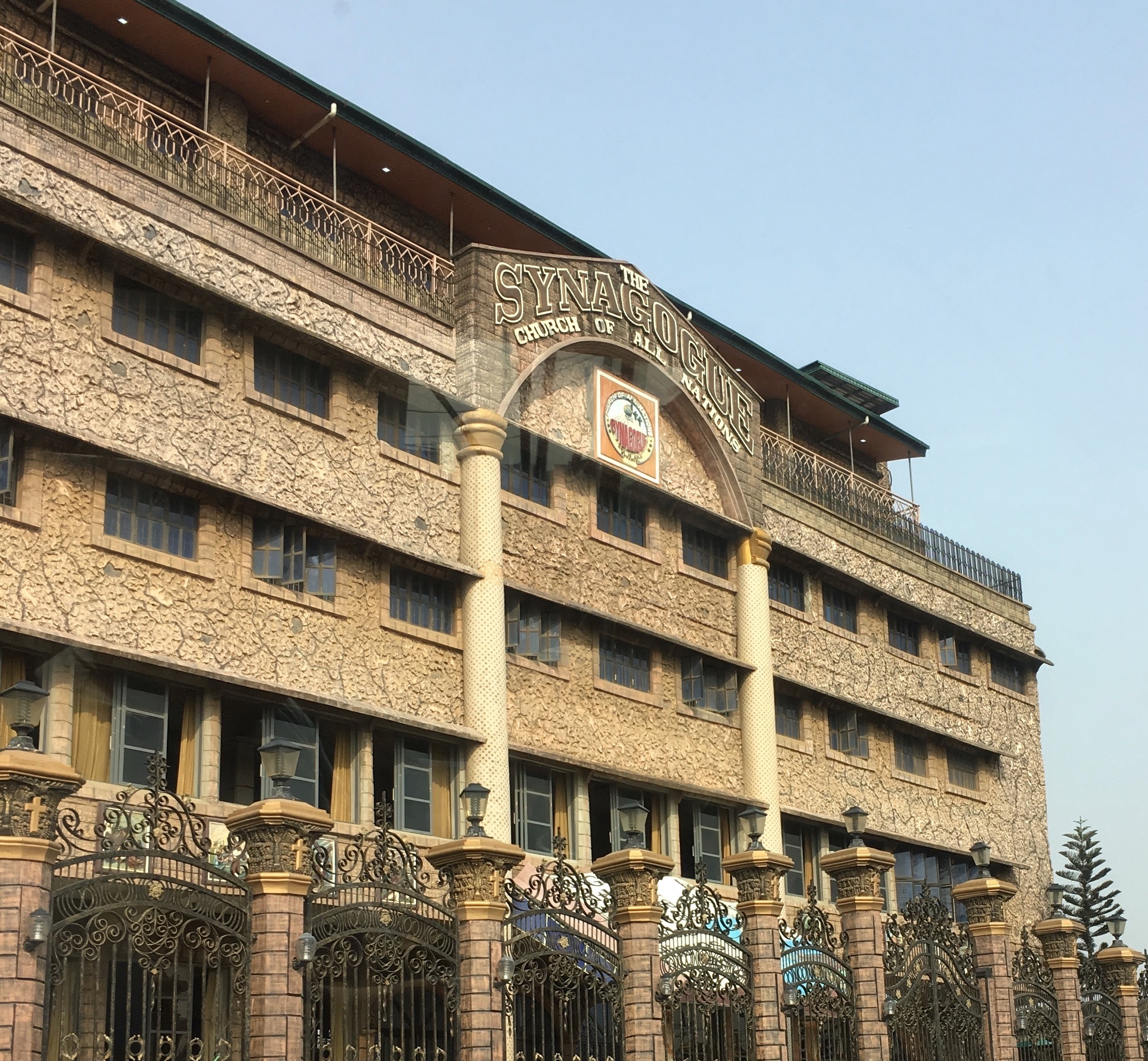
Frontview of the Synagogue Church of all Nations

== Formation of Synagogue Church of All Nations ==
Joshua wrote that in a heavenly vision he had received divine anointing and a covenant from God to start his ministry. Following this, Joshua founded the ministry organisation known as Synagogue, Church of All Nations (SCOAN). According to the organisation, more than 15,000 members attend its weekly Sunday service; visitors from outside Nigeria are accommodated in the accommodation blocks constructed at the church.

The Guardian reported that SCOAN attracts more weekly attendees than the combined number of visitors to Buckingham Palace and the Tower of London. SCOAN's popular services have also resulted in an enormous boost for local businesses and hoteliers.

Although Joshua's videos were distributed worldwide, gaining a large social media presence, the church has only one branch, in Ghana. Joshua said in 2014 that it was "not yet time" for him to have branches worldwide.

SCOAN has been described as "Nigeria's biggest tourist attraction" and "the most visited destination by religious tourists in West Africa," with thousands of foreigners flocking to attend the church's weekly services. Figures released by the Nigerian Immigration Service indicated that six out of every ten foreigners entering Nigeria are bound for SCOAN, a fact discussed in Zimbabwean parliament when addressing the economic potentials of religious tourism.

This Day newspaper reported that "about two million local and inbound tourists" visit SCOAN annually. The church's popularity has led to an increase in flight routes to Lagos from several African countries in 2013. Joshua's contribution to Nigeria's religious tourism was highlighted when the cleric hinted at the possibility of relocating his ministry to Israel during a Sunday service. Several prominent Nigerians opposed the relocation, urging Joshua to remain in the country, and citing the economic setbacks Nigeria would likely experience as a result of his potential relocation.

=== Foreign visits ===
Joshua travelled to Korea, Singapore, Indonesia, Australia, Colombia, Mexico, Peru and Paraguay to hold what he called "crusades." He also visited Israel to receive a humanitarian award from ZAKA and to visit biblical sites. Joshua's "Miracle Crusade" in Cali, Colombia in July 2014 was allegedly attended by 100,000 people and held in the Estadio Olímpico Pascual Guerrero. He travelled to the iconic Estadio Azteca in Mexico, and was allegedly visited by 200,000 people over two days in May 2015.

Joshua's two-day visit to Estadio Monumental "U" in Lima, Peru, attracted nearly 100,000 in September 2016, making headlines in local Peruvian media. In August 2017, Joshua held a Crusade in Paraguay at Estadio Defensores del Chaco. His visit caused a media storm when the Paraguayan parliament approved that the cleric be awarded the National Order of Merit, the country's highest honour, which is usually reserved only for Paraguayan citizens. Testimonies from those who alleged they were healed through Joshua's prayers at the crusade made headlines in local media.

In June 2019, Joshua held a two-day event at the Amphitheatre of Mount Precipice in Nazareth, Israel, the historic hometown of Jesus Christ. The event was the subject of intense media scrutiny. Local religious officials told their followers to boycott the event and several small protests were held calling for the event's cancellation. An estimated 15,000 people travelled from over 50 nations to attend the event, significantly boosting local tourism.

=== Humanitarian work ===
There is a rehabilitation programme for militants from Nigeria's volatile Niger Delta region, repentant armed robbers and sex workers who came to the church for 'deliverance'.

In 2009, Joshua provided two electrical transformers to a local community after theirs was burned beyond repair. He also donated over N26m to help restore electricity and put an end to over two years of power outage in four councils in the Akoko area of Ondo State in 2017. The cleric made donations to police forces in Nigeria, and Ghana.

SCOAN has a 'scholarship program' which caters for the academic needs of students in their thousands, ranging from primary to tertiary education. In 2012, Joshua sponsored a Nigerian student doing a PhD in Oxford University, with Nigerian media reporting she received £100,000 from the church. He also gave a scholarship to a young Motswana to study at Harvard Law School in America.

After the 2010 Haiti earthquake, Joshua sent a team of medical personnel and humanitarian workers to the affected area, establishing a field hospital called 'Clinique Emmanuel'.

The 'Emmanuel TV Team' assisted victims of the earthquake that struck the nation of Ecuador in April 2016, providing over $500,000 worth of humanitarian aid.

Joshua funded the building and running of a school in Lahore, Pakistan named 'Emmanuel School'. He also rebuilt a school in a rural area destroyed by the 2016 Ecuador earthquake, travelling to Ecuador for the opening of the school in June 2017.

Joshua donated ₦7 million to 258 Nigerian deportees from Libya. Stories of the harsh conditions they encountered and Joshua's subsequent assistance made headlines in several local newspapers.

In 2009, Joshua started a football club, My People FC, as part of efforts to help the youth. Two members of the team played for Nigeria's Golden Eaglets in the 2009 FIFA U-17 World Cup. Sani Emmanuel, who apparently lived in SCOAN for several years, was Nigeria's top-scorer and the tournament's MVP. Emmanuel and his colleague Ogenyi Onazi signed professional contracts with SS Lazio, Onazi a key player for the Nigerian Senior Team, the Super Eagles.

WBO International Light Middleweight boxing champion King Davidson Emenogu said that Joshua has financially supported him throughout his career and purportedly prophesied that he would be a world boxing champion.

Joshua was involved in the meeting of the family of the late president of Liberia, Samuel Doe, with the former warlord Prince Yormie Johnson who was responsible for Doe's death. During this meeting the family publicly forgave Johnson who said it was through Joshua's prayers that he stopped drinking alcohol and turned to Christianity.

The cleric also played a prominent role in reconciling broken homes and restoring families torn apart by false accusations.

In recognition of his humanitarian activities, he was awarded a National Honour by the Nigerian government in 2008 as well as receiving a letter of appreciation from the United Nations. He was further honoured as an Ambassador of Peace by the Arewa Youth Forum, a predominantly Muslim organisation, as well as being recognised with an 'award of excellence' by ZAKA, Israel's primary rescue and recovery voluntary service.

=== Influence in African politics ===
A BBC Africa journalist once suggested that Joshua was "the most powerful man in Africa" due to his alleged influence in the African political sphere.

Days after John Atta Mills became President of Ghana in 2009, he visited Joshua's church for a thanksgiving service, and claimed that Joshua had "prophesied" his ascension to power and specific details relating to his narrow victory over Nana Akufo-Addo. Joshua was a regular visitor to Ghana during Mills' early presidency and allegedly organised "prayer warriors" praying in Osu Castle.

Joshua's supposed "prophecy" concerning the death of Malawian President Bingu Mutharika garnered media attention and was subsequently the subject of a Malawian government inquiry; Mutharika's successor, Joyce Banda, was also a devotee of the cleric. Banda claimed Joshua's prayers healed her husband after he suffered a stroke and regularly visited Joshua in Nigeria while she was Head of State.

Joshua played the role of a peacemaker in the aftermath of the Tanzanian elections in 2015, visiting the country to meet and hold reconciliatory talks with President John Magufuli – a member of his church – and opposition leader Edward Lowassa. Commentators acknowledged his visit significantly reduced tensions in the country after the elections which the opposition party alleged were fraught with irregularities.

Joshua was a key influence in former Liberian warlord Senator Prince Yormie Johnson's decision to endorse the candidacy of George Weah for president in the 2017 Liberian elections. His endorsement came days after the two were spotted publicly together in SCOAN, a visit that caused a media storm in Liberia. Weah's main opponent and former vice president, Joseph Boakai, also allegedly requested to visit Joshua in light of the elections.

In November 2019, Joshua visited South Sudan, where he met President Salva Kiir. He led Mayardit and his cabinet in prayers for peace at the nation's Presidential Palace in Juba and called on leaders to overcome their differences in a message broadcast on South Sudan's state television. Some South Sudanese believed that Joshua had given a "prophecy" of the subsequent unity government formed in February 2020 between Mayardit and rival leader Riek Machar.

=== Media ===
Emmanuel TV, the SCOAN television station, was founded on 8 March 2006 by Joshua.

In April 2021, YouTube suspended Emmanuel TV's channel as a result of alleged hate speech by Joshua in videos on the channel. At the time the channel was suspended, it had over 1,800,000 subscribers and 400 million views. The allegations of hate speech referred to claims made by Joshua in at least seven videos that homosexuality is the result of possession by demonic spirits and that homosexuality can and should be cured via spiritual deliverance. At the time of the channel's suspension, it was the most-viewed Christian ministry on the platform.

In January 2024, days after Joshua's sexual abuse scandal was revealed, Emmanuel TV's satellite channel was removed from DStv by MultiChoice, a South African media company as well as from YouTube for a second time.

=== Wealth ===
Although Joshua criticized pastors who demanded money and politicians who bought-votes, he became one of Africa's wealthiest pastors. Former church insiders estimate that he received tens of millions of dollars from fundraising, pilgrims, sales of videos, and appearances at stadiums full of followers.

In 2015, Sahara Reporters reported that Joshua has secretly purchased a Gulfstream G550 jet through a Bank of Utah trustee. A Joshua aide denied the report.

Nigeria's Premium Times newspaper stated that Joshua formed a company called Chillon Consultancy Limited, incorporated in the British Virgin Islands in June 2006, based on reports stemming from the Panama Papers leak. Joshua denied offshore activity, posting on Facebook, "I am not a businessman and have no business whatsoever. What God has given me is more than enough."

== Criticism and controversy ==
Several prominent pastors in and outside Nigeria condemned him, including Pastor Chris Okotie, who described him as a "son of the devil" as well as Enoch Adeboye, David Oyedepo, Ayo Oritsejafor, and Ted Haggard. The Christian Association of Nigeria (CAN) criticized him (although a CAN delegation attended his funeral). Numerous evangelical and Pentecostal figures in Nigeria denounced Joshua as an "impostor" and occult figure posing as an evangelical.

In 2009, the Pentecostal Fellowship of Nigeria publicly disassociated itself from TB Joshua's church, calling on him to "repent and convert to Christianity." Ayo Oritsejafor, leader of the organization, criticized Joshua for serving as pastor without study in the field.

In 2010, Cameroon's foreign minister Henri Eyebe Ayissi termed Joshua a "son of the devil pretending to be a man of God" and advised hundreds of Cameroonians not to take a planned pilgrimage to Lagos, where several others had been left without accommodation. Rumours of a visit by Joshua to Zimbabwe in 2012 led to an intense national debate, culminating with pastors and politicians strongly objecting.

In 2011, the BBC reported that at least three people in London with HIV died after they stopped taking life saving drugs on the advice of evangelical Christian pastors. The HIV prevention charity African Health Policy Network (AHPN) believed that SCOAN, which maintained an office in Southwark, London, "may" be one of those involved in such practices; SCOAN responded by saying that "we do not ask people to stop taking their medication".

In 2014, SCOAN published videos in which a man who called himself "Mustapha" and purported to be a member of the Islamic terrorist group Boko Haram said that he, and four others, had planned to "bomb" the church, but that he decided to confess these plans after hearing Joshua's prayers. The Nigerian Movement for Accountability and Good Governance called on authorities to investigate the authenticity of the claims.

=== Building collapse ===
On 12 September 2014, a guesthouse at SCOAN's compound in Lagos collapsed, killing at least 115 people, of whom 84 were South Africans. The coroner's inquest concluded that the cause was criminal negligence, but Joshua blamed a 'mysterious' airplane that he claimed had fired an "infrasonic weapon" at the building.

=== Posthumous abuse accusations ===
In 2024, the BBC published findings from a two-year investigation, reporting that Joshua had abused followers over more than 15 years. The BBC reported that at least 150 people lived in Joshua's secretive Lagos compound as disciples, sometimes for years or decades, and many interviewees described SCOAN as a cult. More than 25 church followers from various countries, including Nigeria, Ghana, Britain, the U.S., South Africa, Namibia, and Germany, revealed alleged abuse within the church and by Joshua personally, including multiple rapes, torture, and forced abortions.

One Namibian woman said that Joshua repeatedly raped her the first time when she was seventeen years old, and that she was forced to have five unsafe abortions while at the compound. A British woman also said that Joshua had assaulted her, and that she was held under solitary confinement in the compound, where she made numerous suicide attempts.

Multiple other interviewees reported that they were regularly subject to physical abuse, such as being beaten with electrical cables and horse whips, and were subjected to sleep deprivation. Other witnesses in Nigeria said that after publicly disclosing abuse, they were attacked. SCOAN denied that Joshua had committed any wrongdoing.

Joshua was again accused of faking televised "healings" of followers.

The BBC report led to negative response in African media, with the report being condemned as "propaganda" , and "dirty lies", and other sources questioning why the BBC chose to publish the report long after Joshua's death, when no response would be possible. SCOAN itself condemned the BBC for "descending into fictional narratives and propaganda, thus turning itself into a weapon for a hatchet job as gangsters in the gab of journalism with a destructive ulterior motive for personal gains against a perceived enemy".

=== Purported healings and miracles ===
SCOAN claimed that Joshua regularly facilitates miracles at the church. Hundreds of weekly visitors to "prayer lines" at the church were prayed over by Joshua, and the church claimed he cured people of HIV/AIDS, blindness and open wounds.

Joshua's followers attributed miraculous properties to anointing water that had been prayed over by Joshua, claiming that it healed wounds, or saved them from explosions or helicopter crashes. In 2013, four people died in a stampede in Joshua's Ghanaian branch when an unadvertised service in which the water was being distributed drew huge crowds that exceeded the church's capacity. The incident nearly brought Ghana's capital city, Accra, to a standstill, and led to criticism of Joshua.

In 2014, during the West African Ebola virus epidemic, Joshua also made headlines when he claimed his anointing water could cure people suffering from Ebola. He subsequently sent 4,000 bottles of the water and $50,000 to the Ebola-stricken nation of Sierra Leone. A Sierra Leonean politician claimed that the water cured Ebola. Lagos State Health officials visited Joshua and asked that he use his influence to publicly discourage Ebola victims from visiting his church for prayers.

In 2024, Joshua's former chief lieutenant, Agomoh Paul, who left the SCOAN compound after ten years, said that Joshua was a "genius" manipulator. Paul said that he was in charge of faking "miracles" purportedly performed by Joshua. Paul and others interviewed by BBC News said that those who seemed to be "cured" at the church were frequently paid to "perform or exaggerate their symptoms before their supposed healing took place" and in some instances were drugged or medicated as part of the "faith healing" process. Some were falsely told that they had HIV/AIDS but had made a recovery due to Joshua.

=== Purported exorcisms ===
SCOAN is also known for the purported deliverance during its services of people allegedly possessed by evil spirits.

Veteran Nigerian Nollywood actress Camilla Mberekpe was reportedly delivered at SCOAN. Popular Nollywood actor Jim Iyke also said he received deliverance at SCOAN, and a video of the event subsequently went viral.

A video of Kenyan Olympic athlete Mercy Cherono receiving deliverance through Joshua's prayers attracted widespread attention in Kenya. She subsequently testified in the company of her husband how the evil spirit had negatively affected her young marriage and career.

=== Claimed prophecies ===
Joshua was a self-proclaimed prophet who frequently made predictions of future tragedies and events. His predictions were frequently vague or based on hindsight. He asserted that the Holy Spirit was the "source" of dozens of predictions.

Based on a January 2013 sermon in which Joshua said that followers "should pray against suicide bombers or an attack of any kind that will affect many," SCOAN claimed that Joshua had made a "prophecy" of the November 2015 Paris attacks. In January 2009, Joshua predicted a death of "a great star". After Michael Jackson died later that year, Joshua claimed that this was what he was referring to. He claimed to have forecast the April 2013 Boston Marathon bombing based on a sermon months earlier in which he said that he was "seeing flame" in America.

Joshua's church claimed that he prophesied the Garissa University College attack in Kenya, Ouagadougou hotel siege in Burkina Faso, and the 2016 Brussels bombings. Joshua claimed that COVID-19 would disappear globally on 27 March 2020. Joshua also predicted the outcome of two African Cup of Nations (AFCON) final matches. and Nigeria

His prophecy about the impending death of an African president was widely reported in African press. Joshua's followers believe the prophecy concerned the former president of Malawi Bingu wa Mutharika who died in 2012, aged 78. SCOAN claimed that Joshua had predicted the disappearance of the Malaysia Airlines Flight 370, releasing a YouTube video that amassed over 1 million views. The church also claimed that Joshua has successfully predicted events in the lives of individuals who attend his church services.

False rumors spread using Joshua's name are known to have caused widespread panic in communities, affected sporting events, music concerts and led people to stop using social networks.

When Hamza Al-Mustapha, the Chief Security Officer of former Nigerian President Sani Abacha, was released after eleven years of imprisonment, his first port of call was to Joshua's church in acknowledgement of a "prophecy" the cleric allegedly gave him when Abacha was still in power.

Joshua's alleged prophecy in April 2016 that an impending terror attack would befall Ghana made national headlines in the West African nation and led the national police to issue a statement calling for the general public to be calm and vigilant. 600 foreigners reportedly cancelled their visits to Ghana in the wake of the statement.

Joshua incorrectly predicted that Hillary Clinton would win the 2016 presidential election in the United States. After Donald Trump won instead, Joshua stated that his "prophecy" referred to Clinton's win in the popular vote and any misinterpretation was due to a lack of "spiritual understanding".

A video of Joshua predicting "the military" of an undisclosed Southern African nation embarrassing, killing or capturing "a President or Vice-President ... or the First Lady of that nation‚" surfaced on social media after the statement, which was made and recorded in August 2014, was interpreted as a prophecy of the 2017 Zimbabwean coup d'état against Robert Mugabe.

== Successor ==
In September 2021, following her husband's death, SCOAN named Evelyn Joshua as the Senior Pastor and leader of the Church. She is also the President of Emmanuel TV.

== Death ==
T. B. Joshua died on 5 June 2021 "shortly after conducting a live broadcast", according to a BBC report. According to his wife Evelyn Joshua, he showed "no sign of illness" prior to his death.

The news of his death led to reactions in Nigerian media, with the death being described as "huge blow to Nigeria", or "big loss" to Akoko residents, and "blow to religious tourism" especially in Nigeria. Governor of Ondo State, Rotimi Akeredolu described T. B. Joshua's death as "a great global knock" in a tribute.

== Legacy ==
Joshua's influence is often regarded as extending beyond his role as a pastor. Since his passing, his church, SCOAN, has annually commemorated his birthday in June, continuing his legacy through charitable initiatives.

== Bibliography ==
- The Mirror ISBN 0-620-37453-5
- The Step Between You And The Cure ISBN 0-620-33247-6
- Daily Time With God ISBN 0-620-37575-2
- What The Future Holds ISBN 978-0-620-42843-9
