= Yusuf Adebori Adeleye =

Nigerian traditional ruler

- Olubaka of Oka-Akoko
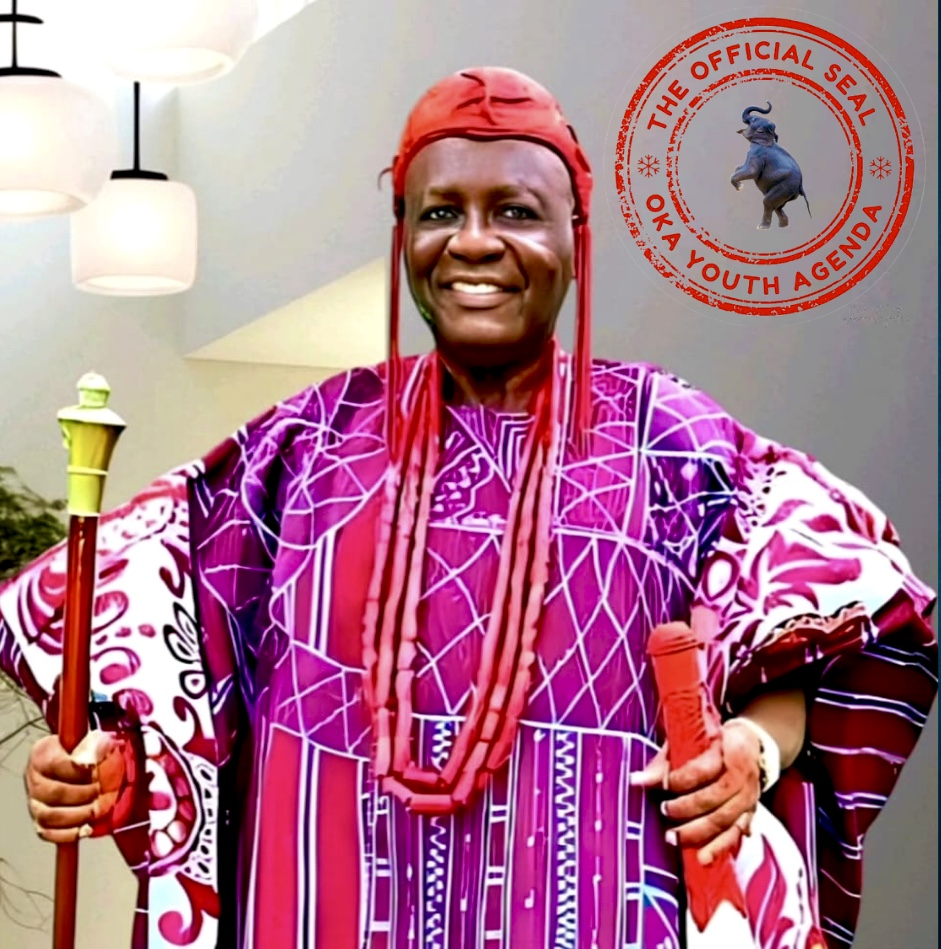
- Coronation: 16 April 1988
- Predecessor: Abraham Olategbon omowa
- Born: 9 November 1946 (age 79); Oka Akoko, Ondo State, Nigeria
- Spouse: Adejumoke Adeleye
- House: Okikon Ruling House
- Father: Saliu Jimba Adeleye
- Mother: Abisatu Adeleye

Yusuf Adebori Adeleye (born 9 November 1946) is a Nigerian traditional ruler and the Olubaka of Oka Akoko.

== Early life ==
Adeleye was born into the royal family of Okinkon, Ibaka in Oka Akoko, Ondo State, Nigeria. His parents are Saliu Jimba Adeleye and Abisatu Adeleye. He attended St. Mark's Primary School from 1955 to 1959 and later continued at Christ African Church Central School, where he completed his primary education in 1965. He also attended African Church Grammar School in Oka Akoko for his secondary education. From July to December 1966, he was trained at the Ikeja Police College. He was admitted into the University of Nigeria Nsukka for his tertiary education and studied law from 1970 to 1973. He obtained his B.L from the Nigerian Law School, Lagos, and was called to bar in 1974.

== Coronation ==
In 1984, Adeleye was one of the princes from the Okikon royal family. He was selected in a process involving sixteen princes from nine royal lineages. On 9 December 1987, the committee of Oka high chiefs announced his selection at Oka town hall. On 18 December 1998, the Supreme Court of Nigeria ruled Olubaka as the sole paramount ruler of the Oka Kingdom; on 16 April 1988, before the court judgement, Governor Bode George had officially recognised Adeleye as the Olubaka.

== Political activities ==
On 14 August 2014, during the Oka day yearly celebration at Olubaka palace Pavilion, Adeleye advised youth to avoid being agents of destruction ahead of the 2015 Nigerian general election. On 6 May 2023, he had an online issue with APC chairman of Akoko South West Sehinde Mise over an allegation that a political meeting was held at his palace in support of a PDP candidate for the 2023 general election. He supported Lucky Aiyedatiwa during the 2024 Ondo State governorship election.

In 2022, Adeleye expressed sadness as Ondo women trooped to his palace to protest over insecurity.
