= Emmanuel TV =

Christian television network in Nigeria

- Country: Nigeria
- Broadcast area: Africa; North/Central America; Parts of Europe; Asia Pacific
- Headquarters: Synagogue, Church of All Nations (SCOAN); Lagos, Nigeria

Programming
- Language: English
- Picture format: 575i (SD – Africa); 480i (SD – US)

Ownership
- Owner: Emmanuel Global Network

History
- Launched: 8 March 2006

Availability

Terrestrial
- Zuku TV: Channel 874

Emmanuel TV is a Christian television network with headquarters in Lagos, Nigeria. It was founded by T.B. Joshua, former senior pastor of the Synagogue, Church of All Nations (SCOAN), in Lagos, Nigeria. It was also the most subscribed Christian ministry channel on YouTube worldwide with well over 1,000,000 subscribers, as of January 2019.

== History ==
In the late 1990s, the SCOAN began to gain international attention due to the distribution of videotapes showing clips of God's early ministries and miracles. Additionally, Joshua began airing regular programs purporting to show 'miracles' on local Nigerian television. However, when Nigeria's National Broadcasting Commission (NBC), under the instruction of then President Olusegun Obasanjo controversially banned the showing of 'miracles', in 2004, most of his programs were taken off air. This eventually paved the way for the emergence of Emmanuel TV on 8 March 2006 by T.B. Joshua.

In 2015, Emmanuel TV's YouTube channel was the most subscribed Christian ministry YouTube channel worldwide and the third most subscribed in Nigeria. Google ranked one of Emmanuel TV's YouTube videos as the fourth most viewed clip ever within Nigeria.

Since its inception, Emmanuel TV has broadcast Christian programmes, stating that its mission is 'to preach the Good News to all mankind.'

== Programming ==
Emmanuel TV broadcasts a range of programmes from Synagogue, Church of All Nations (SCOAN).

== Reach ==
Emmanuel TV is broadcast worldwide on various satellites. Its programmes air weekly on a number of local television stations across Africa, debuting on DStv and GOtv in November 2015, as well as Startimes in February 2016. Its playout centre is located in Johannesburg, South Africa.

The station is also known for its catch-phrase, 'Distance Is Not A Barrier', encouraging viewers to 'pray along' with T.B. Joshua by 'touching the screen'. T.B. Joshua has donated televisions to prisons and hospitals so that they will be able to watch the Emmanuel TV broadcasts.

== Controversies ==
In April 2021, YouTube suspended Emmanuel TV's channel as a result of alleged hate speech by Joshua in videos on the channel. At the time the channel was suspended, it had over 1,800,000 subscribers and 400 million views. The allegations of hate speech referred to claims made by Joshua in at least seven videos that homosexuality is the result of possession by demonic spirits and that homosexuality can and should be cured via spiritual deliverance. At the time of the channel's suspension, it was the most-viewed Christian ministry on the platform.

In January 2024, days after Joshua's sexual abuse scandal was revealed, Emmanuel TV's satellite channel was removed from DStv by MultiChoice, a South African media company as well as from YouTube for a second time.
