= Evelyn Joshua =

Nigerian pastor and televangelist (born 1968)

- Born: Evelyn Joshua; 17 December 1968 (age 57); Delta State, Nigeria
- Occupations: Pastor, televangelist
- Spouse: T.B. Joshua (m. 1990; died 2021)
- Children: 3

Evelyn Joshua (born December 17, 1968) is a Nigerian pastor, media personality and entrepreneur. She was the wife of TB Joshua, and succeeded him as head of the Synagogue, Church of All Nations (SCOAN) following his death.

== Personal life ==
Evelyn was married to T. B. Joshua from 1990 until he died in 2021.

== Becoming new leader of SCOAN ==
In September 2021, SCOAN named Evelyn as its new leader.
