= Emmanuel Onsachi =

Anglican bishop in Nigeria

Emmanuel Onsachi is an Anglican bishop in Nigeria: previously an Archdeacon he is the current Bishop of Okene, one of 11 dioceses within the Anglican Province of Lokoja, itself one of 14 provinces within the Church of Nigeria.

Onsachi succeeded Emmanuel Bayode Ajulo, who retired on 25 May 2017.
