= Taiwo Akerele =

Nigerian economist (Born 1976)

- Born: 30 March 1976 (age 50)
- Occupations: Politician, author, policy economist

Taiwo Francis Akerele (born 30 March 1976) is a Nigerian policy economist, author and politician, who served as the Chief of Staff, Edo State government in Nigeria from 2016, in the Governor Godwin Obaseki-led administration, until he resigned his appointment on 25 April 2020.

== Education and career ==
Akerele studied at Harvard University, Carleton University, Stellenbosch University, the World Bank Institute, the University of Ibadan, and the University of Benin and was a founding member of the Center for Values in Leadership, Lagos Business School. Before his appointment as the Chief of Staff, Edo State, Akerele was a Strategy Group Agent at the United Bank for Africa. He also worked at the First City Monument Bank, and the defunct Fidelity Union Merchant Bank, where he served in the compulsory National Youth Service Corps scheme.

Prior to his political appointment, Akerele was the Project Coordinator for the World Bank Public Financial Management and Youth Employment Program for Edo State, where he initiated budget reform programs, and the creation of public finance management and audit laws for the state government. Akerele is also the Country Representative of Policy House International as well as the FCT Chairman of the Association of Nigerian Authors.

In June 2022, Akerele was appointed as the Technical Adviser to the National Project Coordinator of the NGCares Project, a World Bank- assisted project in Nigeria.

== Politics ==
In 2017, Akerele decried the poor treatment of Nigerian migrants of Edo origin in Libya, and informed of the Edo State government's plan to ensure their safe return, re-integration and a state-sponsored economic empowerment policy that will improve the livelihood of returnees.

On 25 April 2020, Akerele resigned his appointment as Chief of Staff, Edo State, to speculations that he was either at loggerheads with Godwin Obaseki or planned to change political parties. However, Akerele said that his decision was based on "administrative and governance grounds". He also expressed his support for Governor Godwin Obaseki, and showed appreciation for the opportunity to serve in the Edo State government.

Following Akerele's resignation as Chief of Staff, operatives of the State Security Service, Nigeria, also known as the Department of State Security, invaded his private residence and, reportedly, left with some files and documents

In commemoration of Children's Day 2021 which, in Nigeria, is observed on May 27, Akerele warned that closure of schools in northern Nigeria, in response to the worsening security challenges, would only increase the number of out-of-school children from the current 10.5 million children to a projected 15 million by the end of 2021 "if the security challenges in parts of the North are not addressed and if the culture of school closures continues unabated."

In July 2021, Akerele cited "weak" revenue mobilization as one of Nigeria's challenges, even though the country's debt profile is sustainable. Before then, Akerele had urged the Nigerian government to back private sector lending from development partners, as a solution to accelerated infrastructural development.

Akerele, in reacting to latest developments in Edo State politics, cautioned Nigeria's ruling party, the All Progressives Congress, to follow laid down constitutional procedures so as to prevent the imposition of candidates in the run-up to the 2023 General Elections.

In Commemoration of Akerele's 50th birthday in 2026, former Edo State Governor and current senator representing Edo north, Adams Oshiomole, alongside with Festas Keyamo, Nigeria's minister of aviation and aerospace development, praised Akerele. Oshiomole called him a "dependable ally", while lauding his influence and youth mentorship. Keyamo relived their mutual relationship which, according to him, dates back to student activism of the 1990s.. Keyamo further lauded Akerele, calling him "a sophisticated policy advisor who stood on the global stage in Washington to defend the national mandate", while also celebrating Akerele's recent appointment to the Governing Council of the University of Jos.

Nigeria's minister of regional development, Abubakar Momoh, also celebrating Akerele's 50th birthday, acknowledged the milestone as testament to a life of impact. The Director General/CEO of the National Institute for Sports, Comrade Philip Shaibu, also highlighted Akerele's commitment to excellence.

In April 2026, while reacting to tensions in the Middle East, Akerele who is the Country Director of Policy House International said, in a signed statement, that the crisis may relegate key development concerns "affecting vulnerable populations". He further stressed the need for world leaders to consider the Global South as the Middle East crisis rages, calling for policy implementation and mobilization of funds to the benefit of underserved populations

== Personal life ==
Akerele is an indigene of Igarra, in Akoko-Edo, Edo State, Nigeria. He is married to Onayimi Akerele, with four children.

== Awards and recognition ==
Akerele was recognized for his contributions towards human capital development in Nigeria at the Focus Africa Awards & Expo ceremony.

In 2019, Akerele was awarded for Africa Network for Environment and Economic Justice for "championing an Open Government Partnership (OGP)" in Edo State

In 2017, Akerele who was, at the time the Chief of Staff of Edo State, was honored with the name "Omokhafe" ("child is home") in Somorika, a community in his hometown Akoko Edo.This honor, conferred by HRH Oba Sule Idaiye, was in recognition of Akerele's community development efforts in favour of Akoko Edo
