= Lampese =

Town in Edo, Nigeria

Lampese is a town in Akoko Edo Local Government Area in Edo State, Nigeria, located along Ibillo – Abuja highway. The town is a gate way town to both Afemai and Edo State from the Kogi axis, as it is a boundary town between Edo State and Kogi State.

== History ==
Lampese is believed to have been founded by a man named Ekpese, a descendant of the ancient Oba of Benin kingdom who migrated from the ancient Benin kingdom to settle in the present day Lampese. Ekpese is said to have given birth to nine children who later formed the nine quarters in Lampese. The quarters therefore reflects the names of these nine children Of Ekpese. These nine quarters in Lampese are: Efemi, Aforo, Afugbemi, Agba, Akusumemi, Aushan, Ikpakumu, Ilekpi, and Izazi. The community has several rivers like Ukilekpe, Uke, Uke Akpe, Uke Alo, Uke Esia, Uke Ahse, Ukepelilo, Ileja and Ebor.
