= Synagogue Church of All Nations =

Christian Church in Lagos, Nigeria

Coordinates: 6.54698°N 3.27297°E

Synagogue Church Of All Nations
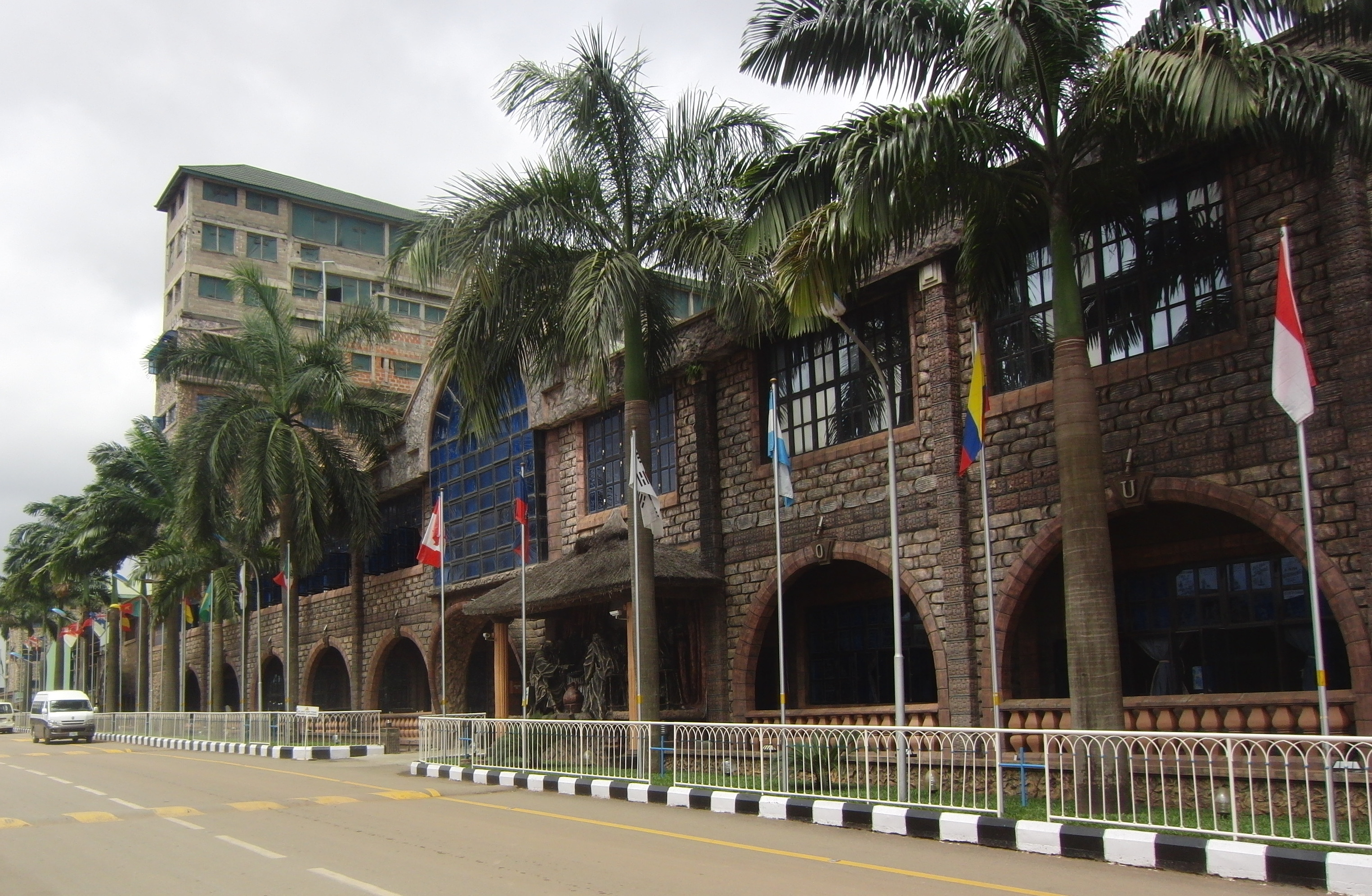
- The Synagogue Church of All Nations
- Synagogue Church Of All Nations
- Location: Lagos, Nigeria
- Country: Nigeria
- Denomination: Non-denominational, Charismatic
- Website: www.scoan.org

History
- Founded: 1987
- Founder: T.B. Joshua

The Synagogue Church Of All Nations (SCOAN) is a charismatic Christian megachurch located in Lagos, Nigeria. The Church was founded in 1987 and has a presence across the globe with over 50,000 individuals attending service weekly.

The church is most associated with its founder T. B. Joshua, who died in 2021. It is also known for its television network Emmanuel TV which live streams services to viewers around the world. In 2024, the BBC reported allegations of widespread abuse and torture by Joshua. In 2024, Joshua's widow, Evelyn Joshua, became church leader.

== History ==
T. B. Joshua wrote that in a heavenly vision he received 'divine anointing' and a covenant from God to start his ministry in 1987. The church started with eight members, but has since become one of Nigeria's most influential churches, attracting over 50,000 people to its weekly Sunday services at the headquarters in Ikotun-Egbe, Lagos. Joshua, the church's founder and senior Pastor, died in June 2021 shortly after leaving an ongoing service.

== Religious tourism ==
SCOAN is especially known for the huge number of foreign visitors it attracts with The Guardian reporting the church receives more weekly attendees than the combined number of visitors to Buckingham Palace and the Tower of London. This Day newspapers reported that "about two million local and inbound tourists" visit SCOAN annually.

It has been described as "Nigeria's biggest tourist attraction" and "the most visited destination by religious tourists in West Africa". Figures released by the Nigerian Immigration Service indicated that six out of every ten foreign travelers coming into Nigeria are bound for SCOAN.

SCOAN's contribution to Nigeria's religious tourism was highlighted when the cleric hinted at the possibility of relocating his ministry to Israel during a Sunday service. The announcement proved controversial; several prominent Nigerians urged him to remain in the country, citing the economic setbacks Nigeria would probably experience if he moved out of the country. The church's popular services have significantly helped local businesses and hoteliers.

== Television ==
The church's weekly services are broadcast live on Emmanuel TV as well as on SCOAN's social media platforms.

In April 2021, YouTube suspended Emmanuel TV's channel as a result of alleged hate speech by Joshua in videos on the channel. At the time the channel was suspended, it had over 1,800,000 subscribers and 400 million views. The allegations of hate speech referred to claims made by Joshua in at least seven videos that homosexuality is the result of possession by demonic spirits and that homosexuality can and should be cured via spiritual deliverance. At the time of the channel's suspension, it was the most-viewed Christian ministry on the platform.

In January 2024, days after Joshua's sexual abuse scandal was revealed, Emmanuel TV's satellite channel was removed from DStv by MultiChoice, a South African media company as well as from YouTube for a second time.

== Controversies ==
=== Building collapse ===
On 12 September 2014, a guesthouse located within the SCOAN premises around the Ikotun-Egbe area of Lagos State collapsed completely to the ground. The National Emergency Management Agency (NEMA) and other emergency services were criticized for withholding information about the accident, and much remained unclear about the number of deaths and their nationalities.

At least 115 people died; 84 of them were South Africans. Nigerian emergency services refused to release the nationalities of the victims, but other countries have provided some details about those who died. The vast majority of casualties were from South Africa, but the nationalities of dozens of people remained unclear.

Casualties by nationality
Nation	Number
South Africa	84
Zimbabwe	1
Nationality unknown	30
Total	115

The then governor of Lagos State, Babatunde Fashola, ordered all church workers away from the scene in order to properly rescue trapped bodies. The government also claimed the church did not get government approval before construction. Journalist Nicholas Ibekwe released an audio recording that allegedly captures T. B. Joshua offering bribes to journalists in return for reporting the incident in a way that favorably portrayed the church.

The then senior pastor of the church, T. B. Joshua linked the tragedy to a strange aircraft "hovering" above the building shortly before it fell. A video was released on YouTube that allegedly showed the plane hovering around the building before its collapse. However, the coroner's report unequivocally found the cause to be due to structural failure. Three government agencies, the Nigeria Building And Road Research Institute (NBBRI), the Council for the Regulation of Engineering in Nigeria (COREN) and the Building Collapse Prevention Guild (BCPG), examined the site and found the following inadequacies:

- Inadequate beams of 750mm by 225mm (should have been 900mm by 300mm)
- Inadequately reinforced columns (should have been reinforced with 12 x Y25 bars or 20 x Y20mm bars. Instead they used 10 x Y20 bars (as seen in the video released by SCOAN).
- Inadequate bearing pressure for the central column due to the 2m x 2m x 0.9m foundations.
- Failure to introduce rigid zones for bracing the structure and did not design the frames as an unbraced structure.
- Failure to provide movement joints that could have absorbed any movement due to creep, contraction, expansion and differential settlement etc..
- 8 out of the 12 main beams of the structure failed because they were undersized, under-reinforced (both in tension and shear), the tension bars were poorly anchored to the column supports and 8 x Y20 was used instead of 14 x Y20.
- The ground floor columns were slender and readily gave in to buckling

==== Trial ====
Joshua failed to appear at a November 2015 hearing and SCOAN's lawyers filed multiple applications to stay the proceedings. The Lagos state government repeatedly insisted that the case receive trial.

In April 2016, the court remanded the two engineers in prison custody, emphasizing the seriousness of the charges. Despite these developments, the trial faced prolonged delays, and T. B. Joshua died on 5 June 2021, before the conclusion of the legal proceedings.

Local radio host Freeze made unfavourable comparisons to a similar incident in Lekki, in which Lekki Gardens managing director Richard Nyong was jailed for illegally unsealing a building that he was having constructed and that which later collapsed. Freeze drew attention to Nyong's rapid arrest while Joshua was not arrested at all.

=== Purported healings and miracles ===
SCOAN claimed that Joshua regularly facilitates miracles at the church. Hundreds of weekly visitors to "prayer lines" at the church were prayed over by Joshua, and the church claimed he cured people of HIV/AIDS, blindness and open wounds.

Joshua's followers attributed miraculous properties to anointing water that had been prayed over by Joshua, claiming that it healed wounds, or saved them from explosions or helicopter crashes. In 2013, four people died in a stampede in Joshua's Ghanaian branch when an unadvertised service in which the water was being distributed drew huge crowds that exceeded the church's capacity. The incident nearly brought Ghana's capital city, Accra, to a standstill, and led to criticism of Joshua.

In 2014, during the West African Ebola virus epidemic, Joshua also made headlines when he claimed his anointing water could cure people suffering from Ebola. He subsequently sent 4,000 bottles of the water and $50,000 to the Ebola-stricken nation of Sierra Leone. A Sierra Leonean politician claimed that the water cured Ebola. Lagos State Health officials visited Joshua and asked that he use his influence to publicly discourage Ebola victims from visiting his church for prayers.

In 2024, Joshua's former chief lieutenant, Agomoh Paul, who left the SCOAN compound after ten years, said that Joshua was a "genius" manipulator. Paul said that he was in charge of faking "miracles" purportedly performed by Joshua. Paul and others interviewed by BBC News said that those who seemed to be "cured" at the church were frequently paid to "perform or exaggerate their symptoms before their supposed healing took place" and in some instances were drugged or medicated as part of the "faith healing" process. Some were falsely told that they had HIV/AIDS but had made a recovery due to Joshua.

=== Posthumous abuse accusations ===
In 2024, the BBC published findings from a two-year investigation, reporting that Joshua had abused followers over more than 15 years. The BBC reported that at least 150 people lived in Joshua's secretive Lagos compound as disciples, sometimes for years or decades, and many interviewees described SCOAN as a cult. More than 25 church followers from various countries, including Nigeria, Ghana, Britain, the U.S., South Africa, Namibia, and Germany, revealed alleged abuse within the church and by Joshua personally, including multiple rapes, torture, and forced abortions.

One Namibian woman said that Joshua repeatedly raped her, the first time when she was seventeen years old, and that she was forced to have five unsafe abortions while at the compound. A British woman also said that Joshua had assaulted her, and that she was held under solitary confinement in the compound, where she made numerous suicide attempts.

Multiple other interviewees reported that they were regularly subject to physical abuse, such as being beaten with electrical cables and horse whips, and were subjected to sleep deprivation. Other witnesses in Nigeria said that after publicly disclosing abuse, they were attacked. SCOAN denied that Joshua had committed any wrongdoing.

The BBC report led to negative response in African media, with the report being condemned as 'propaganda', and "dirty lies", and other sources questioning why the BBC chose to publish the report long after Joshua's death, where no response would be possible. SCOAN itself condemned the BBC for "descending into fictional narratives and propaganda, thus turning itself into a weapon for a hatchet job as gangsters in the gab of journalism with a destructive ulterior motive for personal gains against a perceived enemy".
