= Isua Akoko =

Town in Ondo State, Nigeria

Isua is the capital town of Akoko South-east Local Government of Ondo State, Nigeria.

The ancestral origins of Isua Akoko are mixed of Yoruba and Benin traditional and cultural influences in historic similarity and values amongst both Yoruba and the Benin people.

With a land topography of highland and lowland, we have Isua Oke and Isua Ile which simply means the Isua settlers of the highland and the Isua settlers of the lowland. Isua speaks the Uhami dialects that is most similar to the Edo town closer to them and Isua has different languages that is mostly understood by the people with slight differences in pronunciation.

Isua Akoko is a town located in the Akoko South East Local Government Area of Ondo State, Nigeria. It serves as the headquarters for this local government area. Here are some key points about Isua Akoko:

== Geography ==
The landscape around Isua Akoko includes a mix of savannah and lowland forest, with an annual rainfall ranging significantly between 8 and 150 cm and an average temperature between 28 and 35 °C.

Isua Akoko experiences the typical tropical savanna climate of the northern Ondo region, with a long rainy season and moderate to high rainfall. Temperatures stay warm year-round, with a dry season extending from November to March.

== Cultural Background ==
Isua Akoko has a unique cultural fluidity due to its divergent origins, with migrations from both Yoruba and Edo regions influencing its social relations, particularly in aspects like marriage, widowhood, and age-grade systems. This cultural mix sets it apart from the typical Yoruba cultural identity in terms of social relations.

=== Industrial Potential ===
The area is noted for its clay deposits, which have been analyzed for industrial applications such as ceramics, refractories, and pharmaceuticals, due to the high silica and alumina content.

=== Education ===
Akoko, including Isua, is known for its educational prowess, with the region being a home to many professors and educational institutions.

== Security ==
There have been mentions of security issues in the past, like the arrest of a suspected Boko Haram member in the vicinity, indicating vigilance by local security forces.

== Community and Governance ==
Isua Akoko has a traditional governance system where only members of the royal Odovia family can be crowned king, with the king residing in Isua Oke.

== Agricultural and Economic Activities ==
Like many Nigerian rural areas, agriculture plays a significant role in the local economy, with the terrain around Isua Akoko being rocky, suitable for certain crops and livestock.

Isua Akoko's strategic location and cultural uniqueness make it an interesting study in the amalgamation of different cultural influences within Nigeria's diverse ethnic landscape.
