= Jones Arogbofa =

Nigerian military officer (1952–2024)

Brigadier General Jones Arogbofa

Chief of Staff to the President
- In office 10 February 2014 – 29 May 2015
- President: Goodluck Jonathan
- Preceded by: Mike Oghiadomhe
- Succeeded by: Abba Kyari

Personal details
- Born: 10 November 1952 Oka-Akoko, Colony and Protectorate of Nigeria
- Died: 10 February 2024 (aged 71)
- Relations: Seinde Arogbofa

Military service
- Allegiance: Nigeria
- Branch/service: Nigerian Army
- Years of service: 1973–2004
- Rank: Brigadier General

Jones Oladeinde Arogbofa (10 November 1952 – 10 February 2024) was a Brigadier General in the Nigerian Army who served as Chief of Staff to former President of Nigeria Goodluck Jonathan.

== Background ==
Jones Oladeinde Arogbofa was born in Oka Akoko, Ondo State on 10 November 1952. He died on 10 February 2024, at the age of 71.

== Career ==
Arogbofa was a Brigadier General and was commissioned into the Nigerian Army in 1973. He became Chief of Staff to Goodluck Jonathan. He was succeeded by Abba Kyari. After Abba Kyari's death, Arogbofa made a statement by saying: “You must not embarrass the president in addressing issues. The chief of staff to the president must be trustworthy because the president must rely on the chief of staff and believe that you can’t join hands with others against him. The office is not a piece of cake”.
