= Arigidi Akoko =

IMO Arigidi Town in Ondo State, Nigeria

Arigidi-Akoko
- town
- Nickname: Arigidians
- Location in Nigeria
- Coordinates: 7°35′0″N 5°48′0″E
- Country: Nigeria
- State: Ondo State

Population
  - Total: 421,000
  - Religion: Christianity
- Time zone: UTC+1 (West Africa Time)
- Postal code: 342102

A short oral history of Arigidi in Arigidi language by its native speaker

Arigidi is a town in Akoko North-West, Ondo State, Nigeria.

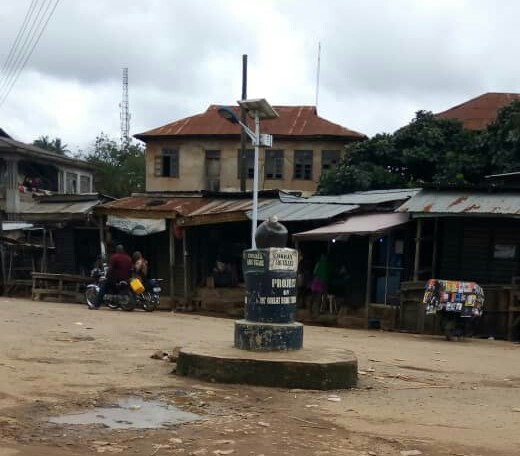
Arigidi sign post

== Festivals ==
There is a festival in honour of the Okota river-goddess from the Yoruba religion. It is sponsored by Olokun Festival Foundation (OFF) under the leadership of Iba Gani Adams Aare ona kankanfo who originates from the village. The Okota Festival is also a celebration of Yoruba culture. Another festival is the Areso Festival.other Festival are ijesu festival (new yam festival) ere festival and ibegbe festival these one occurs one in every ten ten years

== Political composition ==
Arigidi has two out of the ten political wards in Akoko North West Local Government namely, Arigidi Iye ward 1 and Agbaluku Imo ward 2. Ward 1 has 24 political units and ward 2 has 11 units, making 34 units in all.

== Notable people ==
- TB Joshua (1963 – 2021), Pastor and Televangelist, Born in Arigidi Akoko
- Oba Isa Olamipekun current traditional ruler of Arigidi Akoko
- Mallam Gani Ashiru the Obaja of ijaja of Arigidi Akoko
- Otunba Gani Adams, Born in Arigidi
