= Anglican Diocese of Okene =

Anglican diocese in Nigeria

Coordinates: 07°33′N 06°14′E

The Anglican Diocese of Okene is one of eleven dioceses within the Anglican Province of Lokoja, itself one of 14 ecclesiastical provinces within the Church of Nigeria. The current bishop is the Right Rev. Emmanuel Onsachi.
