= Bisayo Busari-Akinnadeju =

Nigerian lawyer,Civic leader, policy advocate and humanitarian

Abisayo Busari-Akinnadeju
- Born: Abisayo Modupe Busari; 20 January 1983 (age 43)
- Education: Obafemi Awolowo University; King's College London; University of Cambridge
- Occupation: Lawyer
- Notable work: 'I am a Nigerian' conference

Bisayo Busari-Akinnadeju (born 20 January 1983) is a Nigerian lawyer, arbitrator, governance strategist and civic leader. Her professional and civic work has included corporate governance, legal advisory, arbitration, energy-sector matters, leadership development, and civic engagement. She is a fellow of the Chartered Institute of Arbitrators (UK) and has been involved in initiatives focused on youth, leadership, education and community developments.

== Education ==
Busari-Akinnadeju holds a Master of Law in International Commercial and Corporation Law from King's College London (LLM-2023).

== Professional career ==
Busari-Akinnadeju has been involved in initiatives focused on youth leadership, citizenship, education, and community development. She is a policy advocate and humanitarian.

She has served in legal and corporate governance roles within Nigerian businesses and has worked on matters involving the energy industry. She has also been involved in arbitration and professional activities through the Chartered Institute of Arbitrators. She is a fellow of the Chartered Institute of Arbitrators, and serves as the chairperson of the energy and power special interest group in the Abuja Nigeria chapter,

== Civic and leadership work ==
She founded Project One, an initiative focused on leadership development, education, civic engagement, and mentorship for young Nigerians. The programme has supported students through educational assistance and leadership activities and has encouraged participants to undertake community projects.

She also convened the “I Am a Nigerian” Conference, an initiative focused on citizenship, national identity, leadership, and nation-building.

She advocates for women leadership.

== Awards and recognitions ==
Abisayo was a finalist for the Active Citizens Award by Budgit.

== Book publications ==
Busari-Akinnadeju has written and self-published works addressing leadership, identity, wealth creation, and civic development. Her publications include Project One Nigerian: Unlock Your Potential Through Your Identity and Project One Nigerian: Unlock Your Potential through Your Identity.

== Political Activities ==
Busari-Akinnadeju sought the presidential nomination of the Democratic Leadership Alliance (DLA) for the 2027 Nigerian general election. In May 2026, she resigned from the party, citing concerns about the conduct of the party's presidential primary and the emergence of a consensus candidate.
