= Ososo =

- Location in Nigeria
- Coordinates: 07°25′00″N 06°16′00″E
- Country: Nigeria
- State: Edo State
- LGA: Akoko-Edo
- Elevation: 1,236 ft (377 m)
- Climate: Aw

Ososo is a town situated in Akoko-Edo Local Government Area, in Edo State, Nigeria. With an average altitude of 1236 feet above sea level, it has a very temperate climate similar to that of Jos, Plateau State. The highest peak is a very large monolith often called the Oruku rock.

== Description ==
The town is made up of four clans: Anni, Egbetua, Okhe and Ikpena. With an approximated population of 100,000 and a combined population density of 5,111 per 7 km radius, it is one of the largest towns in the Local Government Area. Ososo has a unique dialect of the Ghotuo-Uneme-Yekhee branch of the Edoid linguistic lineage.

Ososo shares boundaries with Okene to the north, Okpella to the East, Makeke to the west, Ojah to the South and Ogori to the north-west. It is a boundary town between Edo and Kogi States.

== Mineral resources ==
The town of Ososo is blessed with a commercial deposit of Limestone, and some other solid minerals such as Gold and Granite.

== Tourism ==
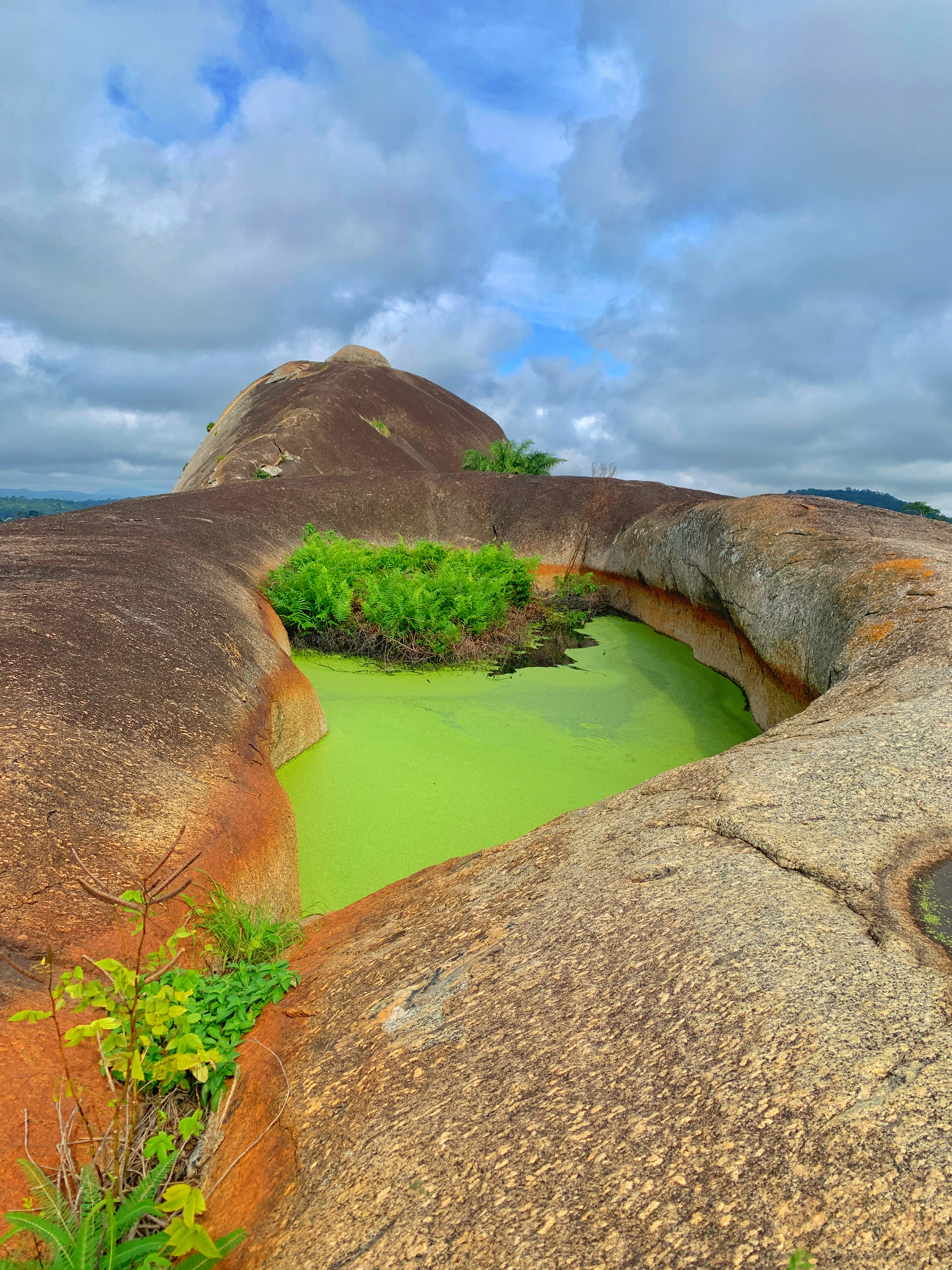
Beautiful hole in the rock at Ososo

Ososo town is on the boundary between Edo and Kogi States, and in a hilly and rocky area. It lies about 40 kilometres from Igarra and 200 kilometres from Benin city in Edo State. There is a non-catering Rest House on top of a hill at Ososo, which has views of parts of Kogi State to as far as the river Niger. An amusement park is being developedas part of the resort which has temperate weather for long periods in the year.

From the tourist centre, a rest house renovated by the Edo state government, there are views all the way to Kogi state.
