= Akoko Edo =

Akoko-Edo Akoko-Ẹdo
- LGA
- Interactive map of Akoko-Edo
- Location within Nigeria
- Country: Nigeria
- State: Edo State
- Headquarters: Igarra

Area
  - Total: 1,371 km^{2} (529 sq mi)
- Elevation: 97.65 m (320.4 ft)

Population (2006)
  - Total: 262,110
  - Density: 249.9/km^{2} (647/sq mi)
- Population density from 2016
- Time zone: UTC+1 (WAT)
- Postal code: 312

Àkókó
Languages
- Akoko languages · Akoko dialects of the Yoruba language · Pidgin English

Religion
- Christianity · Yoruba religion · Islam

Akoko-Edo is a local government area in Edo State, Nigeria. Its headquarters is Igarra. It has an area of 1,371 km^{2} and a population of 262,110 at the 2006 census. It consists of the Akoko people, who are split into Ondo and Edo States. Most are recognized as Yoruba and bear names identical to their counterparts in Akoko Ondo. The Benin conquests during the reign of Oba Ozolua (1483–1504) established its first settlements in the region, while other people including the Bida, migrated there in search of fortune. The war which Oba Esigie fought with the Attah of Idah in 1515–1516, would have also contributed to the migration of the Igbirra and Idah from the north and the east into the area.

The postal code of the area is 312.

As of 2016, its population density is 249.9/km^{2}.

The first local government chairman is Chief Joshua B. Mayaki.

== Geography ==
The ancient Akoko-Edo area is situated in the northern part of Edo State in the south of the Niger-Benue confluence. Its dominant geographical and environmental features are chains of ancient ridges of rugged rocky hills and a cave, stretching across the length and breadth of what is now known as the Akoko-Edo LGA of the present northern Edo State, located between latitudes 6° 45′ and 7° 35′ north, and longitudes 5° 55′ and 6° 45′ east. Akoko-Edo, with a population of about 124,000 by the 1991 census, and 261,567 by the 2006 national population census, occupies a land area of about 1,371 square kilometres or 6.5% of Edo State by landmass and constitutes about 5.70% of the population. The area is described as the ancestral homeland of the Akoko people, whose indigenous language is the Akoko language, which is classified as Akokoid. Akoko-Edo is bounded in the north by the present Kwara State and parts of the present Kogi State, in the north-west by the present Ondo State, in the south-east by both Etsako west (Auchiclans) and Etsako north (Okpella), and in the south-west by Owan.

== Climate ==
Akoko Edo, situated at an elevation of 97.65 m (320.4 ft) above sea level, falls under the classification of tropical wet and dry climate or savanna (Aw).

== Towns ==
The towns include Egl 1, Egbigere 2, Atte, Igarra, Enwan, Aiyegunle, Ugboshi-Ele Ugboshi-Afe, Ekpesa, Ibillo, Ikiran-Ile, Ikiran oke, Ekor, Somorika, Lampese, Imoga, Ojah, Uneme-Akiosu, Ososo, Akuku, Ojirami-Dam, Imoga, Eshawa, Ojirami-Peteshi Ojirami-Afe, Dagbala, Makeke, Ekpe, Ekpedo, Bekuma, Okpe, Ogbe, Onumu, Akpama, Anyonron, Ogugu, Ikakumo, Ijaja, Oloma, Okunese, Uneme-Nekhua, Uneme-Erhurun and Ikpeshi.

== Languages ==
Due to unrestrained migrations and conquests, the people of Akoko Edo speak eight distinct languages that have overlapping occurrences. The indigenous language of the people is the Akoko language, which is closely related to the Yoruba language and a subset of the YEAI. Before the British conquest of Nigeria, most people in the region adopted Yoruba language as a primary language. The Okpameris are the largest tribe in Akoko-Edo and Okpameri language is spoken by majority of the people in Akoko-Edo. Other languages are Etuno, and Uneme. However, the Pidgin English has become the primary language of the people, but many in the region still adopt Yoruba names like their counterparts in Ondo state, the Akoko Ondo. Other languages and dialects in the region include the Ojiramis (Group II), who understand their neighbours, Akuku (Group III) and Enwan (Group I), but not the people in the other villages and settlements.

== Notable people ==
Notable people from Akoko Edo include:

- Olu Ajayi, a Nigerian professional artist, painter, cartoonist, and art reviewer, with over 40 years experience in studio practice and art administration.
- Taiwo Akerele, a Nigerian policy economist, author, and politician.
- Otumba Oladele Bankole Balogun, politician and international lawyer. Executive chairman Edo EIRS
- Peter Akpatason, member representing Akoko-Edo constituency I (2023–2027).
- Domingo Alaba Obende, businessman and politician.
- Akogun Babatunde, Majority Leader House of Representatives, National Assembly, (2007–2011).
- Joseph Babatunde L., Member House of Representatives, National Assembly Akoko-Edo, (1999–2003).
- Omobayo Godwins, a Nigerian politician and deputy governor of Edo State in 2024.
- Emmanuel Omoladun Agbaje, Member House of Assembly Akoko-Edo (2019–2023).
- Idaiye Yekini Oisayemoje, Member House of Assembly Akoko-Edo (2019–2023).
- Donald Ojemeh Okogbe, former commissioner in Edo State, and Member House of Representatives, National Assembly Akoko-Edo Constituency II (2023–2027).
- Prof Iyabode Omolara Akewo Nwabueze, Professor of English (Language), Dean, Faculty of Arts, National Open University of Nigeria, Abuja, Nigeria (2020–2024).
- Modupe Ozolua, a Lebanese-Nigerian-American philanthropist and entrepreneur.
- Robert O. Peters, a Nigerian film producer, director, cinematographer, actor, and occasional voice-over artist.
