= Akoko North-East =

Akoko North-West
- LGA
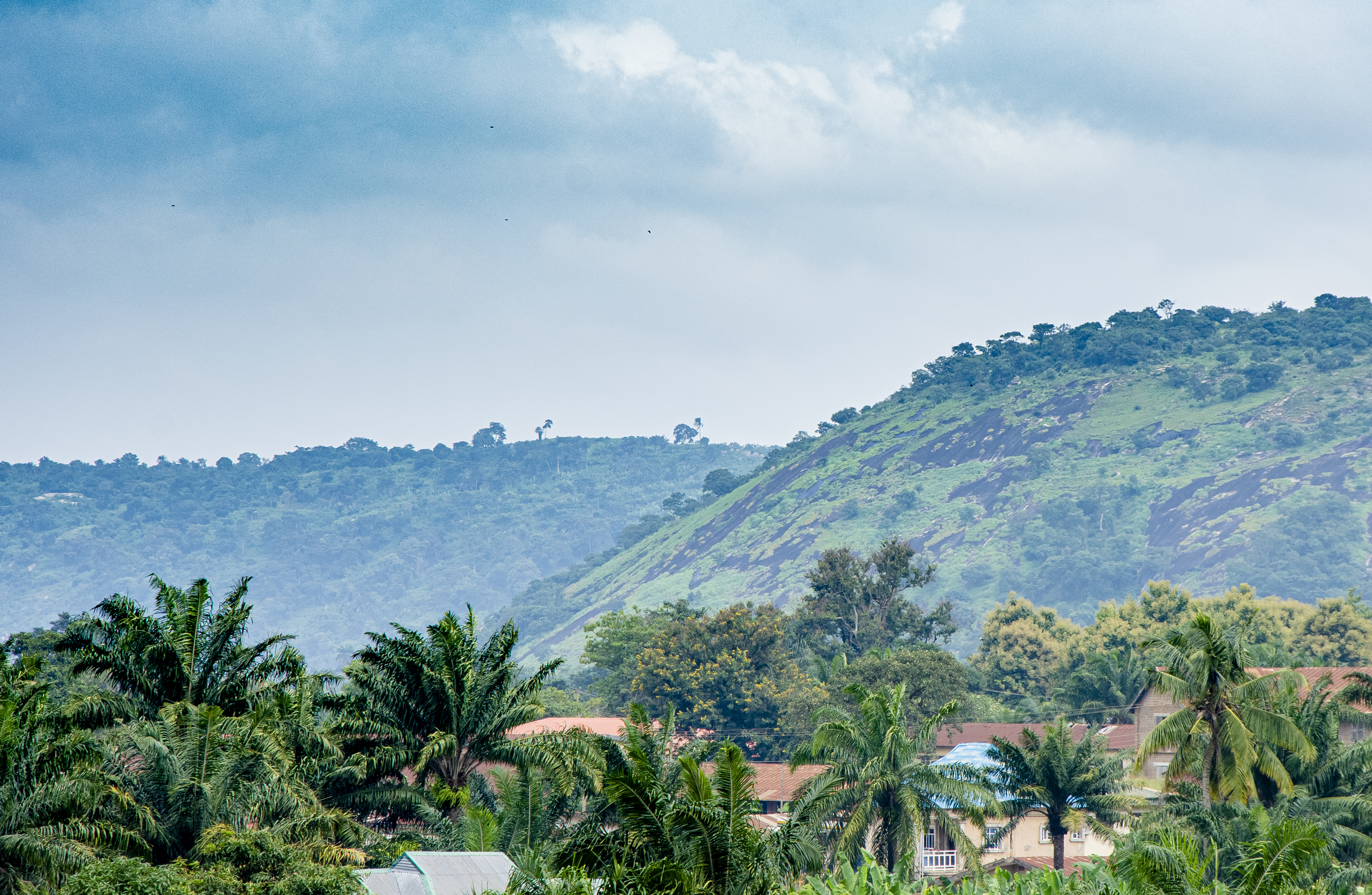
- Interactive map of Akoko North-West
- Location within Nigeria
- Country: Nigeria
- State: Ondo State
- Headquarter: Ikare

Area
  - Total: 372 km^{2} (144 sq mi)

Population (2006)
  - Total: 175,409
  - Density: 472/km^{2} (1,220/sq mi)
- Time zone: UTC+1 (WAT)
- Postal code: 342

Akoko North-East is a Local Government Area in Ondo State, Nigeria. Its headquarters is in the town of Ikare. Akoko North East consist of 6 towns, namely: Auga Akoko, Ugbe Akọkọ, Ise Akoko, Iboropa Akoko, Akunnu Akoko, Ikare Akoko.

It has an area of 372 km^{2} and a population of 175,409 at the 2006 census.

The postal code of the area is 342.

== Climate ==
Akoko North-West lies within the tropical wet-and-dry climate zone of Ondo State. The LGA receives most of its rainfall between April and October, with July–September as the wettest period. The dry season is marked by warm temperatures and lower humidity.

== Economy ==
The people that reside in Akoko Northeast are mostly employed in agriculture, growing significant amounts of products like yam and cocoa. Trade and ceramics are two more important industries in the region. A limitless array of goods is available for purchase at marketplaces like Oja Oba, Okore, and Osele.
