= Akoko South-East =

Akoko South-East Uhami Isua
- LGA
- Interactive map of Akoko South-East
- Coordinates: 7.42°N 5.91°E.
- Country: Nigeria
- State: Ondo State
- Headquarter: Isua

Area
  - Land: 225.2 km^{2} (87.0 sq mi)
- Elevation: 348 m (1,142 ft)

Population (2022)
  - Total: 126,600
  - Density: 562.2/km^{2} (1,456/sq mi)
- Time zone: UTC+1 (WAT)

Akoko South-East is a Local Government Area in Ondo State, Nigeria. Its headquarters are in Isua. Akoko South-East is one of six Local Government Areas in the Northern Senatorial District of Ondo State.

== Geography ==
The landscape is a mix of savannah and lowland forest. Annual rainfall ranges between 8–150 cm (3.1–59.1 in) per year with an average temperature of 28–35 °C (82–95 °F). The territory is divided into Isua Oke and Isua Ile.

Akoko South-East features a tropical savanna climate with a long rainy season extending from April to October. Rainfall intensity increases mid-year, supported by humid southwesterly winds, followed by a dry season dominated by warmer and less humid conditions.

== History ==
The origins of Isua can be traced back to the ancient Benin Empire.

== Demographics ==
The population was 82,426 according to the 2006 census.

== Governance ==
In Isua, only those who come from the royal Odovia family can be crowned as king.

The king resides in Isua Oke.

Location	Area/district	
Abulenla	Supare-Akoko	
Ago Ajayi	Oba-Akoko	
Ago Flower	Supare-Akoko	
Ago Ojo	Oba-Akoko	
Ago Oka	Oba-Akoko	
Ago-Orikuta	Supare-Akoko	
Akunagba -Akoko	Akungba-Akoko	
Akunnu	Akunnu/Isowopo	
Alegunle	Oka-Akoko	
Auga	Akunnu/Isowopo	
Ayegunle	Ifira-Akoko	
Epinmi-Akoko	Epinmi-Akoko	
Etioro	Akungba-Akoko	
Iboropa	Akunnu/Isowopo	
Igboegun	Supare-Akoko	
Igbonla	Supare-Akoko	
Ikakumo	Akunnu/Isowopo	
Ikun-Akoko	Ifira-Akoko	
Ipe-Akoko	Ipe Akoko	
Ise	Akunnu/Isowopo	
Isua-Akoko	Isua akoko	
Iwaro	Oka-Akoko	
Oka-Akoko	Oka-Akoko	
Ose-Oba	Oba-Akoko	
Sosan-Akoko	Sosan -Akoko	Ipesi-Akoko Ipe Akoko is a town in Akoko South East in Ondo State.

== Economy ==
It is an agricultural community. The town is situated on rocky terrain. It comprises ten quarters: Iba, Okun, Isinodo, Ilegbe, Igbede, Ugbe, Itoto, Ipaso, Uwi and Uthakpe quarters. The current king is His Royal Majesty, Oba Evangelist Francis Omokanjuola Apata, The Arogunbola II.
