= Oka Akoko =

Capital of Akoko South-West, Ondo State, Nigeria

Oka Akoko Okarufe
- Town
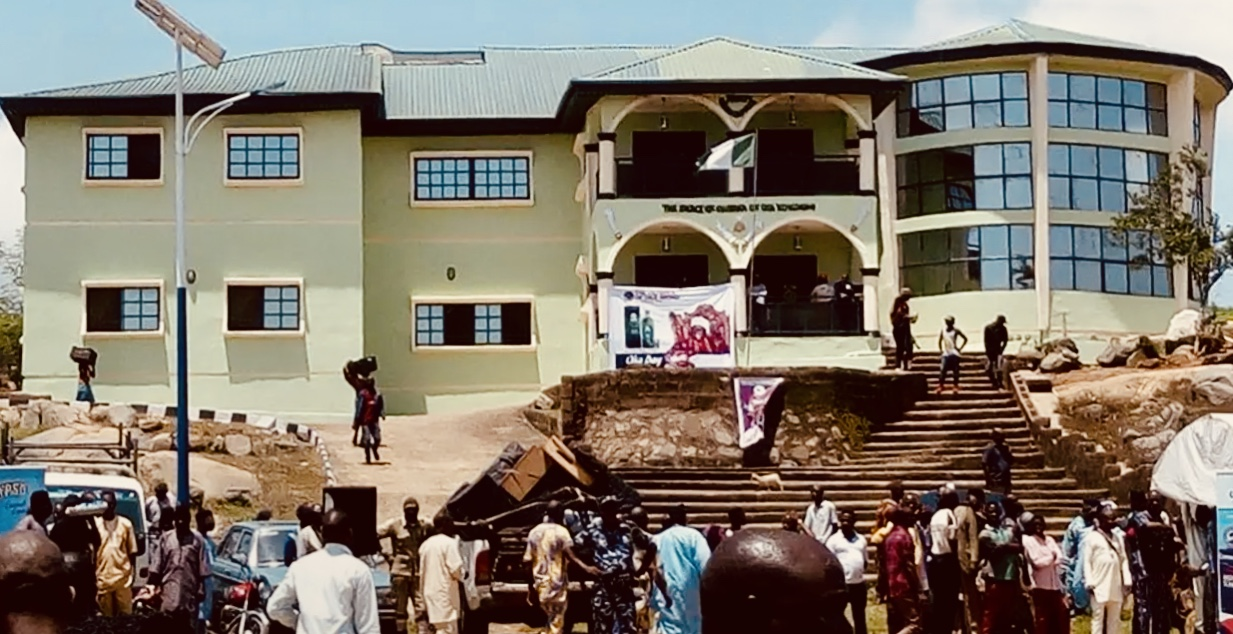
- Oka-Akoko King's Palace
Anthem:
Anthem: Tap to expand
Oka ìlú Ibilemi
Kòsí ìlú bí Oka fúnmi
Bi'moṣákolọ títí
Èmi y'opadà sílè
Ọkà n'ilu mi ò, Okanílé
Ọkà tamu tamu OKARUFE
Lórí oke ;àti petele
Oka nílé ló koo
Ni bikibi t'a báwà
Oka n'ilu wá, Okanile
Eje ki gbogbowa parapo
Láti tún ìlú Oka yíse
Ní kíkú ni yiye
Oka là ó padà sí
Oka n'ilu wá,Okanile
Listen to the Anthem
Oka Akoko Anthem
- Location in Nigeria
- Coordinates: 7°27′25″N 5°48′08″E
- Country: Nigeria
- State: Ondo State
- LGA: Akoko South-West

Government
  - Type: LGA
  - Olubaka of Oka-Akoko: Oba (Dr) Yusuf Adebori Adeleye, OON

Area
  - Total: 3.034 km^{2} (1.171 sq mi)

Population (1991)
  - Total: 44,309
  - Density: 14,600/km^{2} (37,820/sq mi)
- Time zone: UTC+1 (WAT)
- Website: https://okarufeculturalfoundation.org/

Oka-Akoko is the headquarters of Akoko South-West Local Government of Ondo State, Nigeria. It is a majorly agricultural community with hilly terrain.The paramount and traditional ruler of Oka Akoko Kingdom is the Olubaka of Oka.

== Tourist attractions ==
Oka-Akoko is surrounded by numerous hills arranged in a circular formation, making it a scenic destination. These hills are a popular tourist attraction due to their natural beauty and opportunities for adventure. Another notable attraction in the area is the Oke-Maria Catholic Grotto, which draws visitors. The grotto's history dates back to when Rev. Father Seminati, who traveled from Lokoja to Oka Akoko, discovered the site's tranquility and spiritual significance. During his stay, he reported experiencing an apparition of the Holy Mary, mother of Jesus Christ, which inspired him to mark the spot as sacred. According to Father Seminati, the apparition was said to be a singular event, but it sparked a wave of devotion among locals and visitors. In December 1974, the diocese gathered to erect a statue of Holy Mary at the site and consecrate the hill as a place of prayer. Since then, the Oke-Maria Catholic Grotto has become an international Marian Pilgrimage Centre, attracting devotees and tourists alike.

=== New Yam Festival ===
The New Yam Festival is an annual celebration held in Oka Akoko, Ondo State, Nigeria. The festival takes place every first Saturday of August and marks the official start of the new yam harvest. During the festival, achievements of individuals within the community are recognized, including investors, philanthropists, and notable figures. Chieftaincy titles are conferred upon deserving sons and daughters of Ọkà Àkókó, as well as non-indigenes who have made notable contributions to the community. The Oka Yam Festival has become a symbol of unity among the people of Oka Akoko and the broader Ondo State community. It serves as a rallying point for the town's sons and daughter Of Oka Akoko to promote Cultural heritages.

== Notable people ==
- Jones Arogbofa: Nigerian military officer and politician
- Seinde Arogbofa: Nigerian writer and Afenifere chieftain
- Robert Ajayi Borofice: Nigerian politician
- Olugbenga Omole: former member of house of assembly
- Yusuf Adebori Adeleye: Nigerian traditional ruler.
