= Igarra =

Town in Edo State, Nigeria

Igarra (also known as Etuno) is the Headquarters of Akoko Edo Local Government Area of Edo State, Nigeria. The town is made up of the Ugbogbo, Utua, and Uffa quarters. It is beautified with rocky terrains, and is surrounded by the Kukuruku Hills.

Igarra residents, known as Anetuno, speak the Etuno language and share linguistic and cultural similarities with the Egbira of Kogi State.

Igarra is also one of the ethnic nationalities that makes up Afemailand.

The founding fathers of Igarra migrated from Idah in present day Kogi State under the leadership of Ariwo Ovejijo who was a prince in Idah and who left Idah with his supporters because he felt cheated of his right to ascend the throne of the Attah of Igalla many centuries ago. He and his followers, made up of all the present families in Igarra, founded Igarra and he became the first ruler who ruled over his followers in the new kingdom under the title of “Otaru Ariwo Ovejijo Oshinoyi Etuno” meaning “Otaru Ariwo Ovejijo, King of Igarra people,” which, up till today, is still the traditional eulogy or appellation for the Otaru of Igarra.

Apart from the fact that the oracle (Eva) favoured the settlement at the present site called Igarra, other factors that contributed to their final decision to settle here, include the following:

1. Cool refreshing spring water from the hills such as the Ivokoto, Ifege, Idiko and Usege springs. Even after the construction of pipe-borne waters, some people in Igarra still prefer the cool spring water from Ivokoto and Ifege.
2. Hills offering protection against external aggression. Igarra is almost totally surrounded by rocky hills.
3. Fertile agricultural soil for crops like Yam, Cassava, and Palm produce. “UNO” mean palm produce in Igala language). Igarra possibly derived its name from this abundant palm produce which they met on their arrival on the land.
4. Flourishing trade in beads with the aborigine – Anafuas.

At the time of the migration, one of the women that came to the present site with Ariwo Ovejijo harboured in her had some grains of guinea corn accidentally or deliberately. This woman was believed to be from Eziakuta family – one of the families that was loyal to Ariwo Ovejijo. This guinea corn grew up, was harvested and regrown. This is probably the reason why the Eziakuta family play significant role in the (osisiakumete) “Ete” is Igarra means land or soil. “Osisiakumete” therefore means the appeasement of the gods of the soil and harvest. It is on this day that Upe Enu date is fixed. (Upe Enu is the new yam festival in Igarra).

As stated earlier, Ariwo Ovejijo and his migrants met very few people residing on the hills of Igarra. These were the Anafuas (midgets), Anivas (foolish people) and Andokonis. Very little is known about these people except that they lived in caves and their life style was simple and unsophisticated compared to the Igarras. These people were eliminated when they began to constitute a menace to the Igarras after settlement. They were either killed or driven away from the area to join their kith and kin in the former Congo Basin (pygmies of the Congo Basin). They are remembered till today by the Arigede song “Andokoni van reku ayi Ido wa” etc meaning Andokonis were our enemies and we conquered them. The Anafuas were a cunning set of people who use the strength of the Anivas to their advantage. The Anivas are believed to be very powerful that they could lift very big stones as barricades against the enemies of the Anafuas. The unfortunate thing amongst them was that they were very foolish hence any foolish behavior in Igarra today is attributed to an Iva blood on any one.

The head of these people coincidentally was called Uno from which Igarra could have also derived its name ‘Etuno’ meaning the land of Uno. The Anafuas were very good trader in beads. They exchanged their beads for farm products. The use of cowries as a medium of exchange was further strengthened. ‘Ovene’, ‘Isu’, ‘Ofa’, and “Opa” were the different types of beads these Anafuas traded in.

== Aba Festival ==
Aba festival is the most celebrated traditional festival in Igarra. It is usually held every seven years and starts during the month of August. The Aba Festival started as a celebration of victory by local hunters over the initial settlers of the land. The festival which is 228 years old marks the climax of activities as it signals the end of a seven-year traditional administrative tenure and the beginning of a new one. The festival is always colorful with fun and flair. The festival has been rated by Total E & T in 2006 as the sixty indigenous cultural festivals in West Africa.
