= Akoko South-West =

- LGA
- Nicknames: Onile obi, arowo soge
- Interactive map of Akoko South-West
- Location within Nigeria
- Country: Nigeria
- State: Ondo State
- Headquarter: Oka Akoko

Government
  - Type: Local Government Councils
  - Chairman: Ezekiel Ayorinde Ajana

Area
  - Total: 340 km^{2} (130 sq mi)

Population (2006)
  - Total: 228,383
  - Density: 670/km^{2} (1,700/sq mi)
- Time zone: UTC+1 (WAT)

Akoko South-West is a Local Government Area in Ondo State, Nigeria. Its headquarters are in the town of Oka Akoko. It has its area council at Oka Akoko.

It has an area of 340 km^{2} and a population of 228,383 at the 2006 census. The postal code of the area is 342107.

== Chairman and leadership ==
On 11 July 2022, the Supreme Court of Nigeria granted financial autonomy to the 774 local governments in Nigeria. Mr. Ezekiel Ayorinde Ajana was elected as the Chairman of Akoko South West Local Government and sworn in on 18 February 2025 by the incumbent Governor of Ondo State, Lucky Aiyedatiwa.
