= Bashorun =

The Bashorun (also Baṣọ̀run, Ọṣọrun or Iba Ọṣọrun) was the second highest title in the Oyo Empire, following the Aláàfin, the king. The Bashorun was the leader of the 7-person council of Oyo called the Ọ̀yọ́ Mèsi and his position was essentially that of a Prime Minister or Chancellor, which he is often referred to as. In times without an Aláàfin, the Bashorun would rule as regent. It was his duty to protect the unwritten constitution and counter the Aláàfin when he becomes unfit to rule, either through disability or by becoming tyrannical. They are also known as "the king maker" because they play the biggest role in choosing the next Aláàfin. The Bashorun intern is appointed by the Aláàfin; it was custom for the Bashorun to be a descendant of a former Bashorun which has led to various dynasties forming throughout the existence of the title. The office greatly lost significance after a Bashorun, Gáà, overthrew the Aláàfin in 1754.

Tenure	Incumbent Bashorun	Incumbent Aláàfin
c.1300		Foundation of Oyo Empire
c. 1300	Ẹfufu-kò-fẹ-ori	Oranyan, Aláàfin
???	"Ẹrin-din-logun-Agbọn kò ṣe dani ifa"	Ajaka, Aláàfin
???	Salekuodi	Shango, Aláàfin
???	Salekuodi	Ajaka (restored), Aláàfin
???	Banija	Aganjusola, Aláàfin
c. 1400	Ẹrankogbina	Aganjusola, Aláàfin
c. 1400	Ẹrankogbina	Kori, Aláàfin
???	Eṣugbiri	Kori, Aláàfin
???	Eṣugbiri	Oluaso, Aláàfin
c. 1500	Ayangbagi Aro	Onigbogi, Aláàfin
???	Sokia "ti iwọ ẹwn irin"	Ofiran, Aláàfin
???	Ọbalohun	Eguguojo, Aláàfin
ca.1550-1560	Aṣamu	Orompoto, Aláàfin
late 1500s	Ibatẹ̀	Ajiboyede, Aláàfin
late 1500s	Ibatẹ̀	Abipa, Aláàfin
ca 1580-1600	Iba Magaji	Obalokun, Aláàfin
ca 1580-1600	Iba Magaji	Oluodo, Aláàfin
ca 1580-1600	Iba Magaji	Ajagbo, Aláàfin
1600s	Akindein	Ajagbo, Aláàfin
1600s	Akindein	Odarawu, Aláàfin
mid to late 1600s	Woruda	Kanran, Aláàfin
mid to late 1600s	Woruda	Jayin, Aláàfin
late 1600s	Iba Biri	Jayin, Aláàfin
late 1600s	Iba Biri	Ayibi, Aláàfin
late 1600s	Oluaja	Ayibi, Aláàfin
late 1600s	Yabi	Ayibi, Aláàfin
late 1600s	Apalà	Osiyago, Aláàfin
early 1700s	Yau Yamba	Ojigi, Aláàfin
early 1700s	Jambu	Gberu, Aláàfin
early 1700s	Jambu	Amuniwaiye, Aláàfin
mid 1700s	Kogbọ̀n	Amuniwaiye, Aláàfin
mid 1700s - 1754	Soyiki/Èṣùògbó	Onisile, Aláàfin
July 1754 - ca.1780	Gáà	Labisi, Aláàfin
July 1754 - ca.1780	Gáà	Awonbioju, Aláàfin
July 1754 - ca.1780	Gáà	Agboluaje, Aláàfin
July 1754 - ca.1780	Gáà	Majeogbe, Aláàfin
July 1754 - ca.1780	Gáà	Abiodun, Aláàfin
ca.1780-ca.1790	Kangidi	Abiodun, Aláàfin
late 1700s	Aṣamu-Agba o-léèkan	Awole Arogangan, Aláàfin
ca.1800	Alobitoki (?)	Adebo, Aláàfin
ca.1800	Alobitoki (?)	Makua, Aláàfin
ca.1800	Alobitoki (?)	vacant, vacant
???	?	Majotu, Aláàfin
???	?	Amodo, Aláàfin
early 1800s - 1831	Akioṣo	Oluewu, Aláàfin
