= List of rulers of the Yoruba state of Oyo =

Oyo, Oyo State, is the seat of the line of the rulers of Oyo. Their territory, a constituent rump state, is located in what is now Nigeria. Since the 1900 political absorption into Southern Nigeria of the kingdom that it once served as a metropolitan center, the traditional monarchy has been either a tool of British indirect rule or a legally recognised traditional polity within the republic of Nigeria.

In the Yoruba language, the word 'oba' means ruler or king. It is also common for the rulers of the various Yoruba domains to have their own special titles. In Ọ̀yọ empire, the oba is referred to as the Aláàfin, meaning owner of the palace.

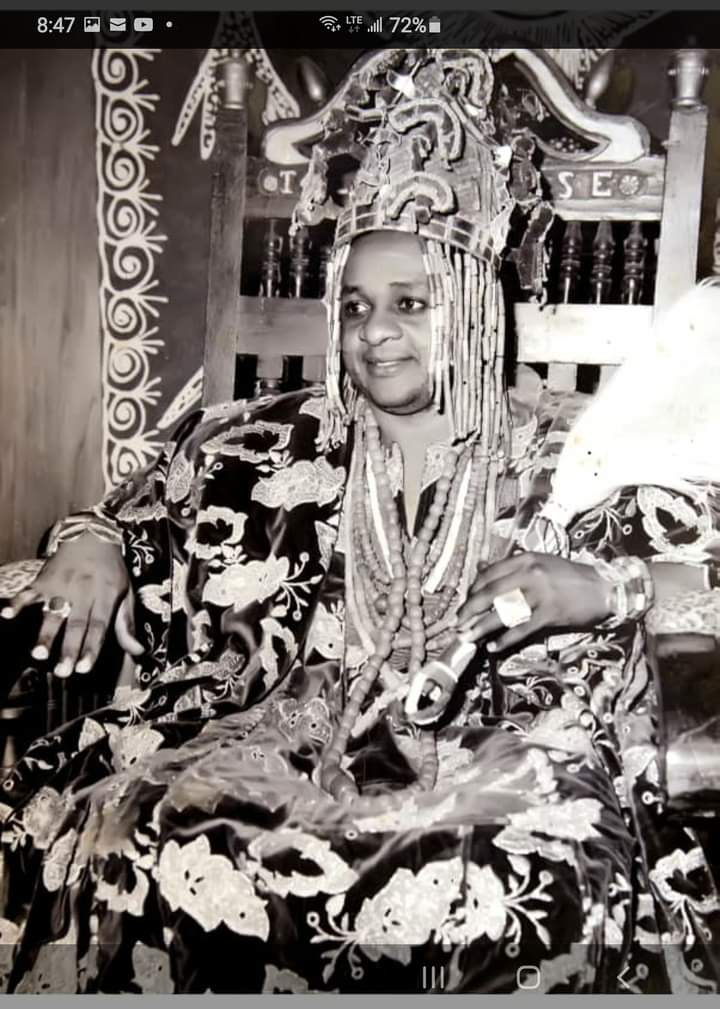
Lamidi Olayiwola Adeyemi III

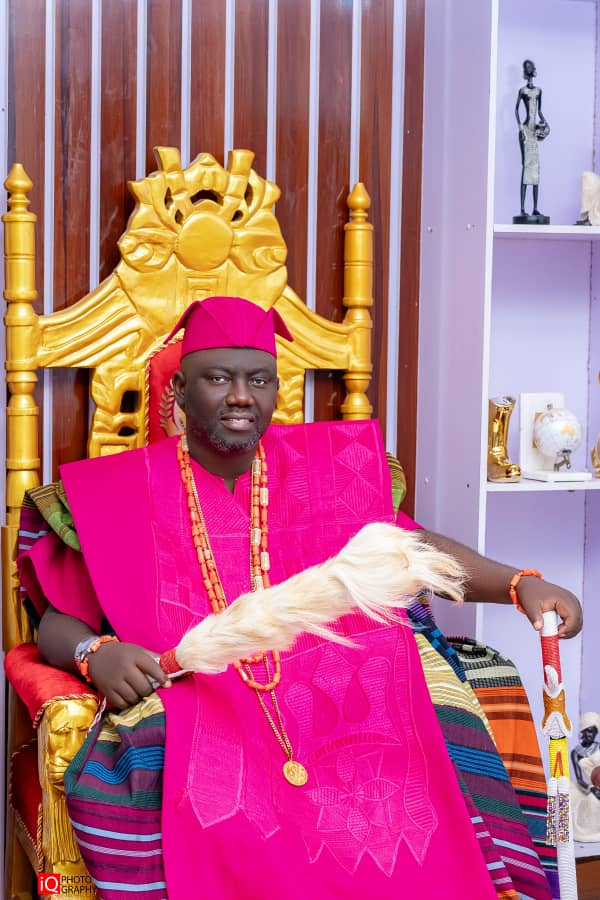
Abimbola Akeem Owoade

The Oyo kings' list and chronology are based on the work of early Nigerian historians Samuel Ajayi Crowther and Samuel Johnson. The various sources do not always agree on names or order of reign, however, and dates before the 19th century are speculative. Numerous early Alaafins whose reigns were unremarkable may not have been remembered, with the total number possibly over 70. Any list, therefore, should be considered a rough reconstruction rather than an exact history.

List of Alaafins of Oyo:

Tenure	Incumbent	Notes
c.1300	Foundation of Oyo Empire	
c. 1300	Oranyan, Alaafin	grandson of Oduduwa and a prince from ile ife, also founder of the Benin kingdom.
???	Ajaka, Alaafin	Succeeded his father, Oranyan. He was said to be a peaceful and calm king, unlike his father, and brother, and his peacefulness caused his more angry and powerful brother to take over and overthrow him.
???	Shango, Alaafin	Yoruba traditions are not clear about his exact parentage, many narratives exist. He was appointed by the Oyo Mesi after dethroning Ajaka, who some say was his brother, he reigned for 7 years, after which he became regarded as an orisha having been combined with Jakuta, an earlier orisha in Yoruba mythology. He is heavily linked to the Nupe people, being of mixed Oyo-Nupe ancestry. One thing traditions are clear on is that he has an elder brother named Dada (if this is Ajaka, it is unclear).
???	Ajaka (restored), Alaafin	Ajaka returned to the throne after the death of Shango.
Mid 14th-Century	Aganjusola, Alaafin	Likely a younger son of Ajaka who succeeded his father. He was said to have tamed many wild animals, and he reigned for an incredibly long time. He is synonymous with the Yoruba deity of the same name.
After c.1375	Kori, Alaafin	Succeeded his father, Aganju, who died while he was still a child. The Kingdom was overseen by his mother, Iyayun as regent. He waged a war with the town of Ede. Under Kori, the city of Oyo Ile expanded to include the region referred to as metropolitan Oyo. He is also regarded to have reigned over 50 years making him the longest reigning Alaafin.
Began early 15th-Century	Oluaso, Alaafin	Succeeded his father, Kori. He was said to be handsome and had up to 1,460 children by his hundreds of wives. O ni ki ogbogbo Oluaso, O le je iya Oluaso – is a saying often interpreted as he living a long but challenging life. A popular narrative places him as the father of the royal dynasties of Ondo town and Ile-Oluji, but Ondo and Ile-Oluji themselves deny this.
c. 1500	Onigbogi, Alaafin	Nupe expanded to occupy Oyo's capital, driving the Alaafin away from his capital in 1500. He fled to take refuge with the Borgu
???	Ofiran, Alaafin	The official Oyo palace account registers that he is the child of Onigbogi, but some evidence suggest his claim to the throne was through his mother - a princess and daughter of Onigbogi, while his father was Borgu. Crowned a King in exile after a period of regency by his mother, Oba Adasobo. He is sometimes considered the 10th Alaafin when the regency of Iyayun and Adasobo are counted. He retook some of Oyo's original territory from the Nupe.
c. 1520 - ???	Eguguojo, Alaafin	Created Igboho as new capital.
1554 - 1562	Orompoto, Alaafin	Sister of Eguguojo, and first break of the Father-Son succession pattern since Aganju succeeded Ajaka. Drove many Nupe away from Oyo in 1555. Continued to record victories throughout her reign.
1562 - 1570	Ajiboyede, Alaafin	Starts the First Bere festival under reign.
1570 - 1588	Abipa, Alaafin	Also called Ogbolu. Born 20 years after the Fall of Oyo-Ile. Rebuilt Oyo-ile back as capital after 80 years in 1580
1588 - 1599	Obalokun, Alaafin	Europeans bringing salt arrive in Oyo during reign of Obalokun. Period of effective expansion. Bringing the Ibolo to the east, and the Ibarapa to the west under direct Oyo control
???? to ????	Oluodo, Alaafin	Drowned in the Niger River during a battle against the Nupe who were still threatening Oyo and undermining Oyo interest in the Okun region
????	Ajagbo, Alaafin	First Alaafin to wear the Sesefun crown. He also created the Aare Ona Kankanfo title
???? to 1659	Odarawu, Alaafin	First recorded Alaafin to get overthrown by the Oyo Mesi.
1659 - 1665	Kanran, Alaafin	He was killed during a mutiny of his army, after refusing to obey orders to commit suicide.
1665 - 1676	Jayin, Alaafin	Tyrant who was overthrown by Oyo mesi.
1676 - 1690	Ayibi, Alaafin	Olusi's son, who was a minor. Basorun ruled as regent until he was of age. Then, he became tyrannical and was rejected by the Oyo mesi. During this time Allada was attacked twice, eventually coming under Oyo in 1698
1690 - 1692	Osiyago, Alaafin	Assassinated after a dynastic dispute between his two heirs.
c. 1724 to 1735	Ojigi, Alaafin	He conquered the Dahomey Kingdom in 1730
c. 1735–1746	Gberu, Alaafin	He conferred Basorun title to his friend, Jambu, out of fear of the existing Basorun's power. Jambu then engineered Gberu's rejection and ruled as regent, then committed suicide as well.
c.1746	Amuniwaiye, Alaafin	Assassinated by a personal enemy
c. 1746 to 1754	Onisile, Alaafin	He was rejected by the Oyo mesi.
July 1754	Labisi, Alaafin	He never formally ruled, and was instead on the 17th day of his installation ceremony compelled to commit suicide by Bashorun Gaa
July 1754 to October 1754	Awonbioju, Alaafin	He ruled for about 130 days, before being compelled to suicide by Bashorun Gaa
1754 to c.1768	Agboluaje, Alaafin	He was forced to commit suicide by Bashorun Gaa after refusing to declare war against the town of Ifonyin
c.1768 to 1774	Majeogbe, Alaafin	Brother of Agboluaje
1774 to April 1789	Abiodun, Alaafin	Defeated Bashorun Gaa with the support of Oyabi, the Aare Ona Kakanfo in 1774. The Egba got their independence during his reign
1789 to 1796	Awole Arogangan, Alaafin	Son of Agboluaje, he installed Afonja of Ilorin as Aare Ona Kakanfo, a distant relative to the Oyo royal family. He was overthrown by Afonja and his army where he committed suicide by poison.
1796 to 1797	Adebo, Alaafin	He ruled for about 130 days, he died likely by suicide or murder
1797	Makua, Alaafin	He ruled for only two months
1797 to 1802	vacant, vacant	The Bashorun Ashamu served as regent during this period
1802 to 1831	Majotu, Alaafin	Is said to have been quite old when he ascended the throne. During his reign Ilorin seceded from Oyo in 1817 and in 1823 Dahomey under Ghezo got their independence
1831 to 1833	Amodo, Alaafin	Ilorin invaded in 1833 and sacked the palace after a long siege
1833 to 1835	Oluewu, Alaafin	the Fall of Oyo empire after the Eleduwe war.
1837 to 1859	Atiba Atobatele (at new capital), Alaafin	Son of Alaafin Abiodun. During his reign Oyo fled south to its current location, where it was known as "Oyo-Atiba." He maintained influence over cities like Ijaye and Ibadan by given titles to their leaders while continuing to call himself 'emperor' and maintained the claim to rule over Yoruba speaking areas even outside his influence. He is the common ancestor of all successive Alaafin of Oyo, and his thirteen sons make up the modern Oyo ruling house.
1859 to 1875	Olujide Adelu Agunloye, Alaafin	Eldest son of Atiba. He was chosen by Atiba to ascend the throne after him.
1876 to 12 November 1894	Adeyemi I Alowolodu, Alaafin	A son of Atiba. He was the last independent Alaafin of Oyo. Signed Treaty with the British on July 3, 1888. On November 12, 1894, the town of New Oyo was bombarded and brought forcibly under British colonial rule.
12 November 1894 to 1905	Adeyemi I Alowolodu (as British Vassal), Oba	
1905 to 1911	Lawani Amubieya Agogoja (as British Vassal), Oba	Eldest son of Alaafin Adelu
1911 to 1944	Siyanbola Onikepe Oladigbolu I (as British Vassal), Oba	Son of Agogoja
1944 to 1945	Regent (as British Vassal), Oba	
1945 to 1955	Adeyemi II Adeniran (as British Vassal), Oba	Son of Adeyemi I
1955 to 1956	Regent (as British Vassal), Oba	
1956 to 1960	Bello Gbadegesin Oladigbolu II (as British Vassal), Oba	Son of Alaafin Oladigbolu I
1960 to 1968	Bello Gbadegesin Oladigbolu II (as Nigerian Traditional Monarch), Oba	
19 November 1970 to 22 April 2022	Lamidi Olayiwola Adeyemi III (as Nigerian Traditional Monarch), Oba	Son of Alaafin Adeyemi II
13 January 2025 to present	Abimbola Akeem Owoade I (as Nigerian Traditional Monarch), Oba	Paternal great-grandson of Alaafin Lawani Amubieya Agogoja, through Agogoja's son Aderounmu Iyanda Owoade.

== See also ==
- Oyo Empire
  - Yoruba states
    - List of rulers of the Yoruba state of Dassa
    - List of rulers of the Yoruba state of Icha
    - List of rulers of the Yoruba state of Ketu
    - List of rulers of the Yoruba state of Sabe
- Lists of office-holders
