= Labisi =

Lábísí
- Aláàfin of Oyo
- Reign: July 1754
- Predecessor: Aláàfin Oníṣílé
- Successor: Aláàfin Awonbioju

Aláàfin Lábísí was an Aláàfin of the Oyo Empire in the year 1754.

Lábísí was never crowned, because he was forced to kill himself 17 days into his reign. This marks the beginning of overthrow of the Alaafinate by Bashorun Gáà, the Chancellor of the Oyo Mesi and the Empire. Aláàfin Lábísí was isolated as both the Oyo Mesi and large parts of the empire were supportive of the Bashorun, leading to not only his friends being killed but also him being barred from sitting on the throne or even entering the palace. As was custom for such a rejected King he committed suicide.
