= Ajagbo =

- Aláàfin of Oyo
- Reign: ~1600 - 1659
- Predecessor: Aláàfin Olúodò
- Successor: Aláàfin Odarawu

Àjàgbó was a warlike Aláàfin of the West African Oyo Empire, who allegedly reigned for 140 years in the seventeenth century.

He was reportedly born a twin to his brother Ajampati with his maternal town being Ikereku-were, which is said to have later been destroyed.

== Reign ==
Àjàgbó officially succeeded his grandfather Ọbalókun as Aláàfin. This has been questioned by multiple scholars who believe the reign of other Aláàfins like Oluodo have been attributed to him. Àjàgbó concluded a lot of conquests that Ọbalókun started as well as subjugating the Òwu kingdom. He employed a military strategy of sending out multiple armies at once with the aim that they would try to outcompete each other for glory.He was succeeded by his son Odarawu after he died of natural causes.

He is most known for introducing the title of Are Ona Kakanfo, a role comparable to that of field marshal who was supposed to combat the power of the Oyo Mesi and the Bashorun as well as professionalizing the Oyo army.
