= Sango Festival =

Festival in Nigeria by the Yorubas

- Status: Active
- Genre: Festivals
- Frequency: Annually
- Venue: Palace of Alaafin of Oyo
- Location: Oyo State
- Coordinates: 7.8586108°N 3.9321151°E
- Country: Nigeria
- Years active: 1300 AD–present
- Founder: Sango
- Most recent: August 2022
- Next event: August 2023
- Participants: 20,000
- Area: Nigeria, Afro-Caribbean, Brazil, Cuba, Trinidad and Tobago, Portugal, Cameroun
- Organiser: People of Oyo State

Sango Festival, Oyo
- UNESCO Intangible Cultural Heritage
- Country: Nigeria
- Reference: 01974
- Region: Africa

Inscription history
- Inscription: 2023 (18th session)
- List: Representative

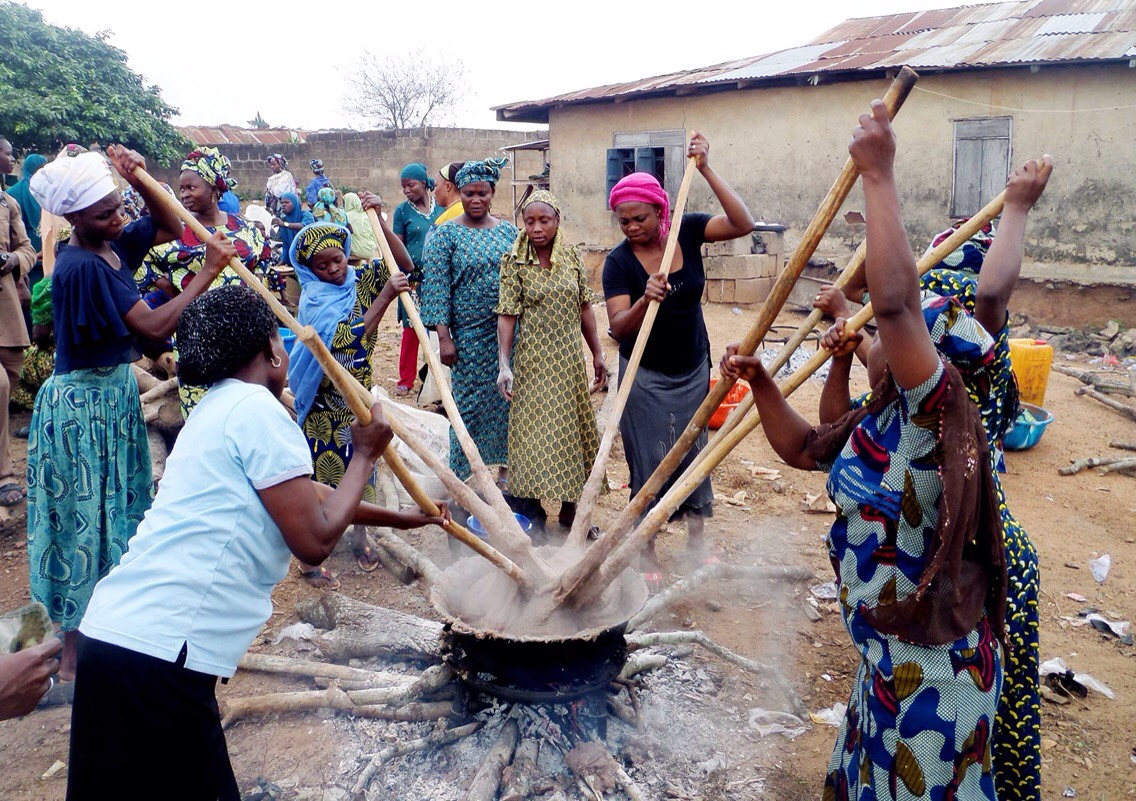
A group of local caterers prepare Amala ( a meal made from yam flour) in Oyo town, South-West Nigeria during the celebration of Sango Festival in Oyo.

Sango Festival is an annual festival held among the Yoruba people in honour of Sango, a thunder and fire deity who was a warrior and the third king of the Oyo Empire after succeeding Ajaka his elder brother. Renamed in 2013 to World Sango Festival by the government of Oyo State, the festival is usually held in August at the palace of the Alaafin of Oyo and also observed in over forty countries around the world.

== History ==
The Sango Festival celebrations can be traced back to 1,000 years ago following the departure of Sango, a popular Yoruba òrìṣà who is widely regarded as a founding father of the Oyo people.

According to tradition, Sango was a notably powerful ruler and magician who became king of the Oyo Empire after succeeding his elder brother who was perceived to be a "weak ruler". Believed to bring prosperity to the people of the Oyo Empire during his reign, Sango's death has been linked to different legendary stories. His reign ended due to the inadvertent destruction of his palace by lightning. Sango was said to have reigned for just seven years as Alaafin over Oyo but with such a powerful leadership he was counted as the best king ever in the history of Oyo rulers. During the 2021 festivity, the Ayabas (lit. 'the king's wives') boasted of how they stopped rain from falling which would have disrupted the ceremony after consulting the Yemọja and the Ṣango priests. The festival often starts with Iwure Agba (lit. 'the prayer of the elders') that is usually led by the Ṣango priest.

== Significance ==
Since its renaming in 2013, the event which is usually held in August and runs for a week attracts over 20,000 spectators around the world including Brazil, Cuba, Trinidad and Tobago and the Caribbean. The event which is recognized by UNESCO, is organized to facilitate the home-coming of the Yorubas in the diaspora and also celebrate Sango who is regarded as one of the greatest heroes in the history of the Yoruba people.

=== How Sango festival is celebrated ===
The Sango Festival is a 10-day event, which is marked with pomp and pageantry. The worshippers are usually adorned with white or red attire. Some of the activities lined up for the festival include: Ayo competition, Ogun Ajobo day, Oya day, Aje Oloja day, Iyemoja day, Esin Elejo day and Sango Oyo day.

== See also ==
- Festivals in Nigeria
