= Onisile =

18th c. Alaafin of the Oyo Empire

Oníṣílé
- Aláàfin of Oyo
- Reign: ca.1746 - 1754
- Predecessor: Aláàfin Amuniwaiye
- Successor: Aláàfin Lábísí

Oníṣílé was an Alaafin of the Oyo Empire during the middle of the eighteenth century and the last ruler before the overthrow of the empire by Bashorun Gáà.

According to tradition, Oníṣílé was both a brave warrior and artistic, as he is said to have had seven silver doors made to the seven entrances of his sleeping apartment.Oníṣílé's downfall reportedly came after he experimented with a plant called the 'sun leaf', that supposedly attracted lightning. He was struck by lightning and paralysed, leading to the Oyo Mesi rejecting him.
