= Gberu =

Ruler of Oyo

- Aláàfin of Ọ̀yọ́
- Reign: ca. 1735 – ca.1746
- Predecessor: Aláàfin Ojigi
- Successor: Aláàfin Amuniwaiye

Gberu was an Aláàfin of the Oyo Empire in the early 18th century.

Gberu appointed his close friend Jambu as Bashorun. Later they started turning against each other and according to oral history tried to cause each other's downfall. Bashorun Jambu along with the Oyo Mesi rejected Aláàfin Gberu and forced him to commit ritual suicide.
