= Aganju of Oyo =

Emperor of Oyo (in present-day Nigeria)

Aganju

Alaafin of Oyo kingdom
- Reign: Mid 14th century
- Successor: Kori

Aganju of Oyo was a 14th-century Yoruba emperor of the Oyo state, in present-day Nigeria. He is said to have been the fourth Alaafin (king) of old Oyo.

== Legacy ==
Aganju is believed to have been responsible for monumental building around the seat of power, including 100 brass posts marking his authority. These posts figure in later histories but none are known to still survive. His reign was said to coincide with a flourishing of industry, including the introduction of leatherwork at Oyo. The Alaafin's palace's 'Kobi Aganju' or 'Courtyard/Porch of Aganju' is said to date from his reign and is named for him. The porch section, called the 'Oju Aganju', was at the entrance of the ancient, now ruined, palace, and was "waiting hall of chiefs during coronation and other activities."

== Oral history ==
Oral histories of his period of rule were transcribed by the Rev. Samuel Johnson, a Sierra Leone born clergyman who published his history as 'The History of the Yorubas' in 1921. In it he records Aganju as succeeding the historical Shango through the ruler's brother and Aganju's father, Ajaka and was in turn succeeded by his wife Iyayun. Johnson describes his reign as the first of the "historical" rulers, and a time of growth, Aganju's reign being "long and very prosperous." Aganju's bride was captured in war with a rival 'Aganju the Onisambo', and at the end of his reign, the Alaafin was said to have had his only son from a previous wife was killed for attempting to seduce Iyayun. Aganju was then said to have died, "overcome with grief." Iyayun's unborn child was meant to succeed Aganju, with the mother acting as regent. His son was named Kori, and ascended the throne following the regency of his mother.

Oral histories also describe Aganju as being able to tame animals, including "venomous reptiles" and a leopard he kept in his palace.

== Relation to spirit Aganju ==
Because he shares the name of the Yoruba deity of the same name, Aganju, and because some oral histories say he was the origin of the deity, later historians have questioned his historicity or simply declared him 'mythical'.

== See also ==
- List of rulers of the Yoruba state of Oyo
- Oyo Empire
- Yorubaland
- History of the Yoruba people
