= Amuniwaiye =

- Aláàfin of Oyo
- Reign: ca.1738 - 1742
- Predecessor: Aláàfin Gberu
- Successor: Aláàfin Oníṣílé

Aláàfin Amuniwaiye was an Aláàfin of the Oyo Empire, who ruled during the 18th century.

Amuniwaiye was the crown prince of the late Aláàfin, Gberu, who was forced to commit suicide by his former friend Bashorun Jambu. According to legend Aláàfin Amuniwaiye sought revenge on Bashorun Jambu and tried to kill him with the help of a medicine man called Olukoyisi. Amuniwaiye however sexually abused the medicine man's wife. After having heard of that, it is said, Olukoyisi put glue on his wife so when she next met Aláàfin Amuniwaiye they'd be inextricably adhered to each other. In the process of separating the two, both died.
