= Osiyago =

Osinyago
- Aláàfin of Oyo
- Reign: 1690 - 1692
- Predecessor: Aláàfin Ayibi
- Successor: Aláàfin Ojigi

Osinyago (or Ọsinyago/Osiyago) was an Aláàfin of the Oyo Empire.

He was probably a brother to Aláàfin Ayibi and a grandson to Aláàfin Jayin. Ọsinyago was noted to be a greedy king, who gained wealth through any means necessary.

According to legend Ọsinyago's second born, princess Ọmọsún, was expected to be the heir to the throne. Ọsinyago however adopted his cousin Woruale as his successor. During an argument Princess Ọmọsún killed Woruale, whose father swore avengence. His father then poisened Ọmọsún, Aláàfin Ọsinyago, Baṣọrun Apalà and various other nobles, including the Bashorun, who all died.
