= Kanran =

- Aláàfin of Oyo
- Reign: 1659 - 1665
- Predecessor: Aláàfin Ódárawu
- Successor: Aláàfin Jayin

Kanran, or Karan, was an Alaafin of the Oyo Empire, who was preceded Odarawu. His reign was short and tyrannical and he was overthrown by the Oyo Mesi.

He was considered a fierce and tempestuous leader, and is said to have subjected his subjects to severe punishments. He inspired the Oyo proverb, 'O nika ninu ju Karan lo' ('He is more cruel than Karan').

As a result of his propensity to harm his own people, a plot to terminate him or get him to abdicate the throne was entered into by his nobles. He was rejected by the Oyo Mesi (the principal counselors of the state) but defied the subsequent order to commit suicide. When the army entered his city to depose him, Kanran reportedly climbed onto the roof of his palace and shot arrows at them until the building was set on fire.

He was succeeded by his son Jayin.

== A Series Of Excerpts From The Oral Records Of Oyo ==
Kanran sent an army against the town of Aga Oibo, but before it could be taken, the conspirators sent a messenger to the king asking for his fan-bearer to be offered as a sacrifice.

Kanran complied with the request and a sacrificial meal was in return offered to the king for consumption. However, as Kanran ate the meat, the conspirators announced that Kanran had eaten his own fan-bearer.

They followed this by stating that due to this, the king's words no longer had any value with anyone - most especially the Oyo army. The conspirators then demanded that Kanran commit suicide, signalling his exit from the throne. By this point, his army had indeed turned against him as he had committed an abomination before the gods.

The trap succeeded and Kanran was subsequently killed battling his enemies.
