= Aganju =

Orisha in the Yoruba religion

- Volcanoes; Wilderness; Desert; River
- Member of Orisha
- Other names: Agayú, Aggayú
- Venerated in: Yoruba religion, Umbanda, Candomble, Santeria, Haitian Vodou, Folk Catholicism
- Region: Nigeria, Benin, Brazil
- Ethnic group: Yoruba people, Fon people

Genealogy
- Parents: Ajaka (father)

Equivalents
- Catholic: Saint Christopher

Aganjú (also known as Agayú or Aggayú in the African diaspora) is an Orisha in Yoruba religion and its descendant traditions in the Americas. He is a primordial deity associated with the sun, fire, and the untamed wilderness. In the Cuban tradition of Santería, Aganjú is associated with volcanoes and syncretized with Saint Christopher.

Aganjú is historically and mythologically linked with Shango. In the history of the Oyo Empire, Aganju was a legendary Alaafin, described in some oral traditions as the nephew of Shango and the son of Ajaka. Both Shango and Aganju are considered deified ancestors who once ruled the Oyo state.

== Traditions ==
=== Yorubaland ===
In Nigeria and Benin, Aganjú is venerated as a deified warrior king originating from the town of Shaki in Oyo State. Unlike Shango, who is associated with thunder and lightning stones, Aganjú is said to fight with a sword, paralysis, and fire and heat. The geography of Shaki, characterized by massive monoliths and boulder outcroppings, is often cited as the physical manifestation of Aganjú's rugged and "mountainous" power.

=== Santería (Lucumí) ===
In the Cuban Lucumí tradition, Aganjú is primarily recognized as a volcano deity. While there are no active volcanoes in Yorubaland or Cuba, this association is attributed to his volatile temperament and his mythological relationship with Oroíña (the spirit of the earth's core). Some scholars note that while extinct volcanoes exist on the Biu Plateau in Northeastern Nigeria, these are geographically distant from the Yoruba heartland; thus, the volcanic association likely evolved within the diaspora as a metaphor for Aganjú's explosive power.

=== Candomblé ===
In Afro-Brazilian Candomblé, Aganjú is often worshiped as a specific "quality" or manifestation of Shango, referred to as Xangô Aganjú. He represents the raw, uncontrollable aspects of fire and the earth. He is sometimes affectionately called Xangô menino (the child Shango), representing the youthful, vigorous energy of the deity.
