= Odarawu =

- Aláàfin of Oyo
- Reign: 1620s - 1630s
- Predecessor: Aláàfin Ajagbo
- Successor: Aláàfin Kanran

Ódárawu was an Aláàfin of the Oyo Empire, who ruled briefly during the seventeenth century. He was the first Aláàfin recorded to be dethroned by the Oyo Mesi.

Ódárawu was the son of Àjàgbó and ruled for a short period of time. He was considered a man of bad temperament. According to Oyo legend his bad temper led him to being removed as king and also served as a warning and lesson to future kings on character development.

Before Ódárawu was crowned, he was a great trader. In the market of Ojo-Sẹgi he expected a discount for being a royal and did not pay the full sum for his purchase. The trader, not knowing he was a royal, accused him of being a thief and slapped him. After he ascended the throne he ordered the destruction of Ojo-Sẹgi. This was seen as tyrannical and he was therefore dethroned and killed by the Oyo Mesi through ritual suicide.
