= Makua (Oyo ruler) =

Makua was an Alaafin of the Oyo Empire who died after ruling for two months in 1797. In the List of rulers of the Yoruba state of Oyo, he was the 32nd Alaafin of Oyo.

== See also ==
- Oyo Empire
- Rulers of the Yoruba state of Oyo
