= Oluodo =

Short-lived 17th-century Alaafin of Oyo

- Alaafin of Oyo
- Predecessor: Aláàfin Ọbalókun
- Successor: Aláàfin Àjàgbó

Aláàfin Olúodò was an Aláàfin of Ọ̀yọ́ who died shortly after being crowned. He ruled the Oyo kingdom in the early 17th century and was preceded by Ọbalókun and succeeded by Àjàgbó. Olúodò continued the efforts and policies of Ọbalókun of both expansion and encroaching on the global market.

== Death ==
During a war against the Nupe, Olúodò lead the army and drowned in the Niger river during a Nupe counterattack. He was denied a royal funeral by the Oyo chiefs, because his body could not be retrieved from the water.
