= Abipa =

16th–17th century Alaafin of Oyo

- Aláàfin of Ọ̀yọ́
- Predecessor: Aláàfin Ajiboyede
- Successor: Aláàfin Obalokun

Abipa, also known as Ogbolu or Oba M'oro, was an Alaafin of the Oyo Empire. He is believed to have ruled during the late sixteenth and early seventeenth centuries.

== Early life ==
Abipa was the son of Egunoju and one of his queens. He was reportedly born when the royal party was on the road approaching Igboho (his name is contracted from a bi si ipa - 'one who is born on the wayside').

Prior to his reign, three rulers of Oyo had presided from Oyo-Igboho instead of the capital city Oyo-Ile, due to external threats from the Nupe and internal squabbles. Abipa was the Alaafin who moved the capital back to Oyo-Ile after both threats were subdued. The return to Oyo-Ile occurred in the early seventeenth century.

According to tradition, some nobles who wanted the capital to stay at Oyo-Igboho sent people to masquerade as phantoms when Abipa's advance party visited the site of the former capital. Abipa realised what was happening, and sent hunters to round up the bogus phantoms. For this he is also known as Oba m'oro, 'the king who caught ghosts'. The story is still re-enacted during annual festivals at Oyo and on the installation of a new Alaafin.

When the royal party entered Oyo-Ile, Abipa offered his newly born son to be sacrificed. For this action his oriki calls him 'the royal catcher of ghosts who sacrificed his son for the peace of the world'.

He was succeeded by Obalokun.
