= Ojigi (Oyo) =

- Aláàfin of Oyo
- Reign: ca.1724 - ca.1735
- Predecessor: Aláàfin Ọsinyago
- Successor: Aláàfin Gberu

Aláàfin Òjìgí (also Ojiji) was a warlike Aláàfin of the Oyo Empire in the early 18th century.

Aláàfin Òjìgí enjoyed the strong support of several important chiefs. Òjìgí launched four military incursions against the Kingdom of Dahomey after the receiving requests for assistance from other kingdoms who were threatened by Agaja, the Dahomean king. In 1730 the Dahomeans agreed to begin paying an annual tribute of forty men, women, guns, and four hundred loads of cowries and corals to Oyo. Òjìgí also held an expedition to trace out his realm and show his sovereignty. This expedition allegedly started at the Niger at Borgu, followed the river down to and along the coast and then returned through Popo/Aja country, which lies between modern-day Togo and Benin.

Òjìgí reportedly failed to control the behaviour of his Aremo, the first-born prince, and was therefore formally rejected by the Oyo Mesi. After Òjìgí died, the Aremo was required to commit suicide.

Òjìgí was succeeded by Gberu.
