= Ajiboyede =

Former Alaafin of Oyo

Ajiboyede was a successful but autocratic Alaafin of the Oyo Empire during the sixteenth century. He succeeded Orompoto.

== Events of reign ==
Ajiboyede is credited with starting the three-year festival known as Bebe, to celebrate peace after the victory over the Nupes and to celebrate Ajiboyede's long reign. During the peaceful period, commerce and agriculture thrived, and the new capital of Igboho began to grow as a result of a favorable geographical location and population concentration. In the process, two major markets were established during his reign, and the city became a major trade route for acquiring horses from Hausaland.

Shortly after the Bebe festival began, Ajiboyede's firstborn son, Arema Osemolu, died. Whilst Ajiboyede was mourning and fasting he reportedly had some chiefs visiting him executed for supposedly having eaten food, which nearly caused a rebellion.

Ajiboyede was succeeded by Abipa.
