= Oluaso =

15th century CE Oyo emperor

Alaafin of Oyo kingdom
- Reign: during the early 15th-century CE
- Predecessor: Kori
- Successor: Onigbogi

Oluaso was an Alaafin of the Oyo Empire known for his handsome and strong physique. Legends of his reign describe it as one of peace, longevity and love. He built numerous palaces in the empire and also had numerous wives and children.
