= Obalokun =

- Aláàfin of Oyo
- Reign: 1588 - 1599 (or 1620s)
- Predecessor: Aláàfin Abípa
- Successor: Aláàfin Olúodò

Ọbalókun (Yoruba translation "King of the Ocean") was an Aláàfin and celebrated warrior-king of the kingdom of Ọ̀yọ́. He is also remembered as the Aláàfin under which Oyo first entered the Atlantic Slave Trade and contact with European powers. One of his nicknames was "Aágànná Erin" which translates to the plundering elephant, alluding to his expansionist policy.

He was first in an era of successive despotic and short-lived kings of Oyo.

== Reign ==
Ọbalókun was an ambitious and expansionist king. Under him the defensive cavalary force Oyo had gained through trade with the Sahel had fully transformed into an offensive one, for which Oyo was later known for.

His conquests, while not all concluding during his lifetime, include lands in Ìgbómìnà, East Central Èkìtì, the Upper Ọ̀ṣun area, Ègbá and most notibly advances into the strip between the Yéwá and Ogun rivers (also referred to as Ẹgbado Corridor) which first gave Oyo access to the Atlantic Ocean and the global market.

According to some there might have also been a short lived Iléṣà tributary around the year 1600 during Ọbalókuns rule.

== Life ==
Ọbalókun Agana Erin was born to the daughter of the Alake of Egbaland.

According to Oyo tales, he was in communication with a European King (most likely Portugal but maybe France)

He was succeeded by Oluodo.
