= Ofinran =

Alaafin Of Oyo
- Reign: 16th century
- Predecessor: Onigbogi
- Born: Nigeria
- Died: Nigeria
- Burial: Saki, Nigeria

Ofinran was a 16th-century king of the Oyo Empire in West Africa who succeeded Onigbogi as Alaafin after the latter had left for exile in Borgu with a few other Yorubas from Oyo. Ofinran was then made king in a foreign land and joined his host in expeditions around the Niger River and the two communities co-existed.

However, the favorable treatment of the Oyos in Borgu was short-lived. Hostilities soon emerged and Ofinran and his men decided to leave for a town called Kusu. In the process of their ill luck of being driven away from their original homes, they may have believed their problems was due to the unfavorable disposition they originally had towards the Ifá deity.

While in Kusu they embraced the Ifá divinity and called for a man named Alado to initiate the Alaafin and his subjects in order to wade away any ill wind related to their original rejection of Ifá. Also, according to Oyo fables, it was during this period that the Egungun festivities also emerged in Yorubaland. It was thought that the Egungun priest followed the Yorubas from Borgu into Kusu.

Ofinran later died and was buried in a palace in Saki.
