= Volcano deity =

List of gods purported to control volcanic activity

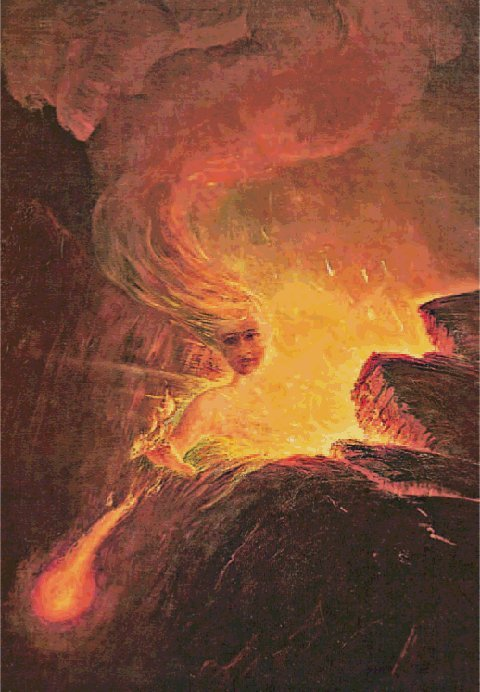
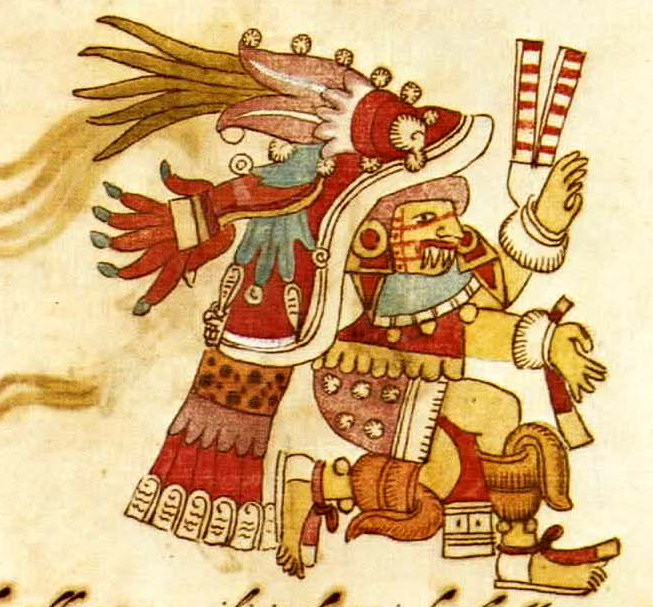
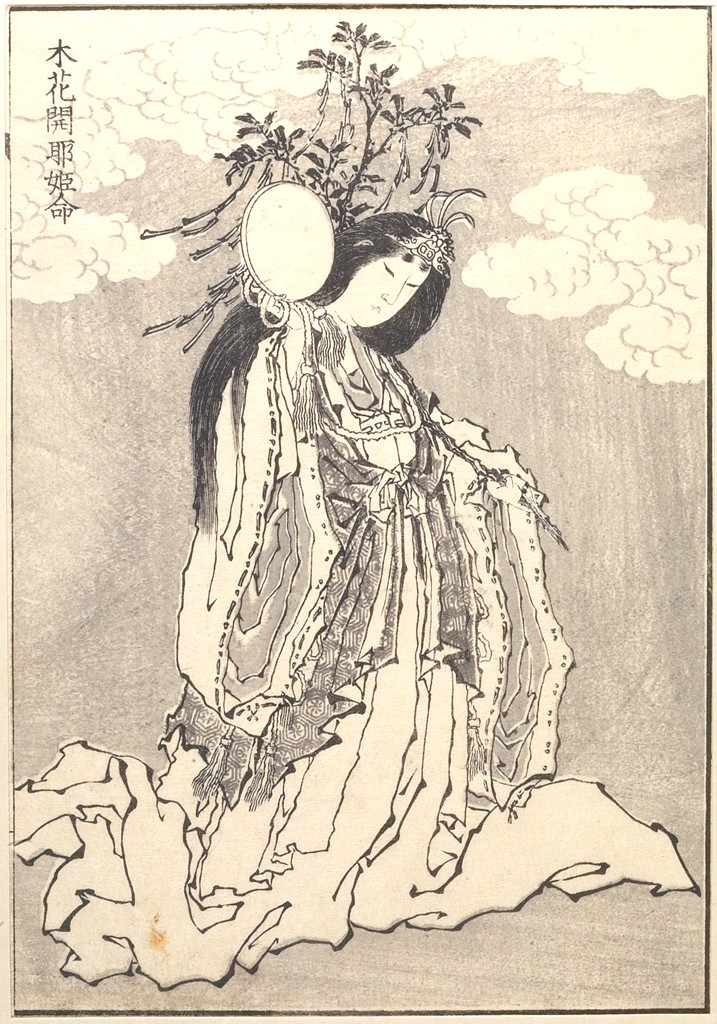
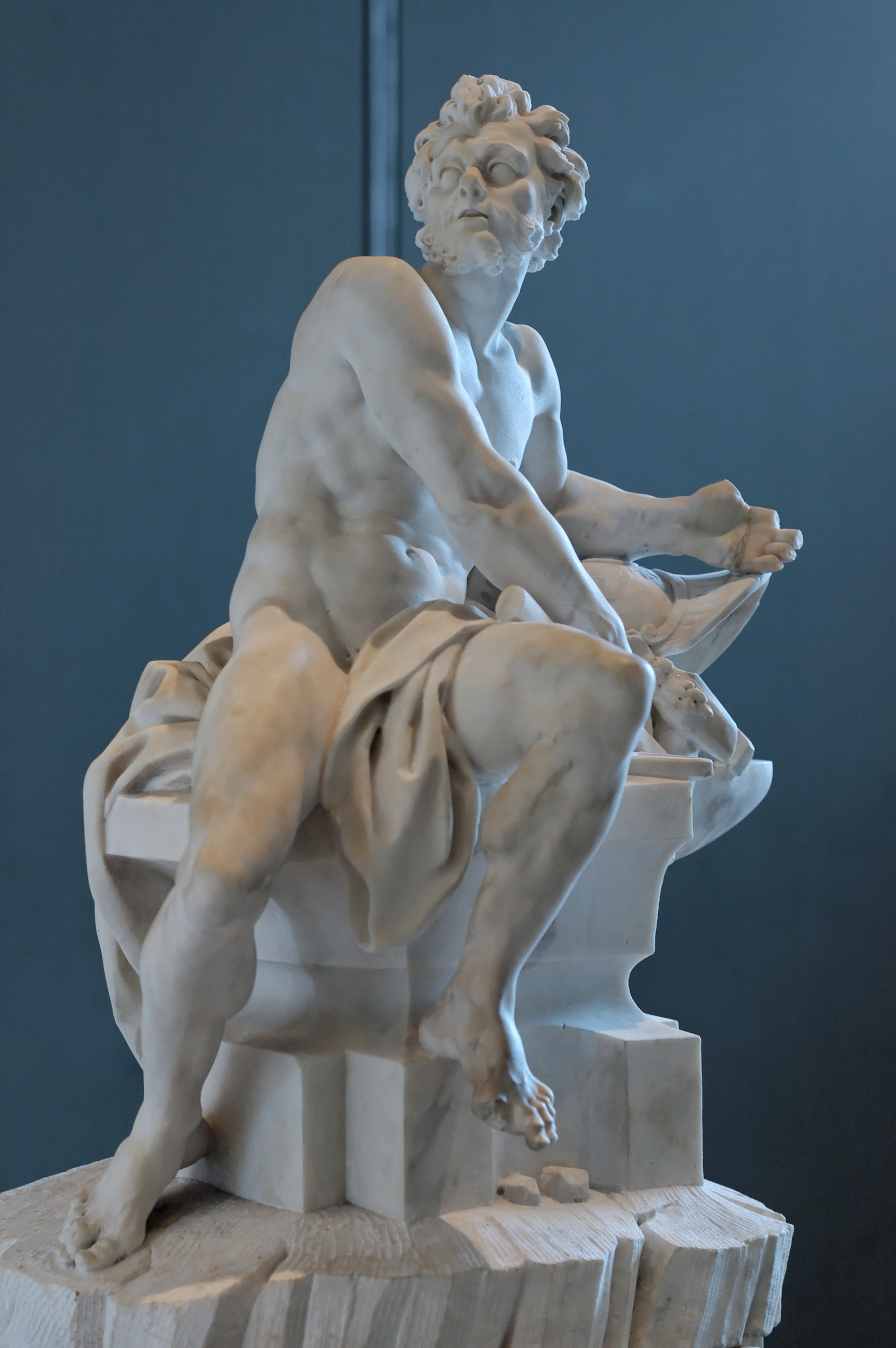
Examples of volcano deities from different cultures (from top): Pele, Chantico, Konohanasakuya-hime and Hephaestus.

A volcano deity is a deification of a volcano. Volcano deities are often associated with fire, and are often represented as fire deities as well. The following is a list of volcano deities:

== Africa, Near East and Spain ==
- Yahweh, in pre-Judaic Hebrew religion. Some scholars (for example, Martin Noth in his Exodus: A Commentary and Jack Miles in his Pulitzer Prize-winning God: A Biography) suggest that the ancient Hebrews worshipped or associated their god with a volcano.

=== Santeria religion ===
- Aganju, in Cuba, is a volcano deity for the practitioners of the Lucumi.

=== Guanche mythology ===
- Guayota, Guanche, malignant deity which lived inside the Teide volcano.

== Asia and Europe ==
=== Indigenous Philippine folk religions ===
- Lalahon, in Philippine mythology, Goddess of fire, volcanoes and harvest.
- Kan-Laon, Visayan god of time associated with the volcano Kanlaon.
- Gugurang, Bicolano god of fire and volcanoes who lives inside Mayon Volcano which erupts whenever he's enraged.

=== Greco-Roman world ===
- Vulcan, in ancient Roman religion and myth, the god of fire including the fire of volcanoes, deserts, metalworking, and the forge.
- Hephaestus, Greek god of blacksmiths, metalworking, carpenters, craftsmen, artisans, sculptors, metallurgy, fire, and volcanoes.

== Americas ==
=== Aztec religion ===
- Chantico, goddess of the hearth fires and volcanoes.
- Xiuhtecuhtli, god of fire, day, heat, volcanoes, food in famine, the year, turquoise, the Aztec emperors, and the afterlife.

== Polynesia and Pacific ==
=== Māori mythology ===
- Rūaumoko, in Māori mythology, god of earthquakes, volcanoes and seasons.

=== Hawaiian religion ===
- Pele, in the Hawaiian religion, goddess of volcanoes and fire and the creator of the Hawaiian Islands.

== See also ==
- Solar deity
- Mother Earth
- List of nature deities
