= Ladigbolu I =

Siyanbola Ladigbolu was Alaafin of Oyo from January 1911 to 1944. He was the Alaafin of Oyo when Northern and Southern protectorates of Nigeria were amalgamated in 1914.

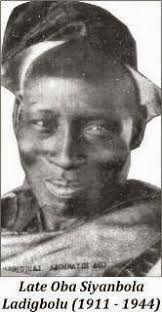

== Biography ==
Before becoming Alaafin, Ladigbolu I held the title of Aremo, similar to a crown prince, he succeeded his father Oba Lawani to the throne in 1911.

Ladigbolu I was close to the colonial authorities and was appointed as a ceremonial member of the Nigerian Council before it was disbanded in 1923. When Oyo province was created and under the administrative colonial resident, Captain William Ross, Ladigbolu's sphere of influence was enlarged.

Prior to colonial rule, internecine wars within Northern Yorubaland had shifted political power among Yoruba city states, Ibadan had risen as a political player in the region but still paid Oyo respect as an historical and spiritual center. However, political supremacy was disputed. 1914 he supply armies men, women and food to fight at first world. Oyo province, consisting of, Ibadan, Ogbomoso, Iwo and Oyo was carved out of Southern Nigeria and Ladigbolu I was appointed traditional head of the province to the dissatisfaction of Ibadan chiefs and other Obas.

The position elevated the power of Ladigbolu I and the political power of the Alaafin which had been in decline since the beginning of the nineteenth century. Together, the Alaafin and Ross were a diarchy who agreed on administrative and political decisions within the province. When Ross left the province, agitation by Ibadan chiefs got positive response from colonial authorities. The title of the traditional ruler of Ibadan was changed to Olubadan (Oba) from Baale, a lineage head who headed a committee of head of lineages. Gradually, some of the influence Ladigbolu I enjoyed were curtailed.

== Death ==
Wole Soyinka's play, Death and the King's Horseman, about an aide of a king who refused to commit suicide after the king's death as was the local custom was related to events surrounding the death of Ladigbolu.
