= Orelope =

- LGA
- Interactive map of Orelope
- Country: Nigeria
- State: Oyo State
- Headquarter: Igboho

Government
  - Local Government Chairman and the Head of the Local Government Council: Raheem Akeem Adepoju (PDP)

Area
  - Total: 917 km^{2} (354 sq mi)

Population (2006)
  - Total: 104,441
  - Density: 114/km^{2} (295/sq mi)
- Time zone: UTC+1 (WAT)
- Postal code: 212

Orelope is a Local Government Area in Oyo State, Nigeria. Its headquarters are in the town of Igboho.

It has an area of 917 km^{2} and a population of 134,000.

The postal code of the area is 212.

== History ==
Orelope LGA is one of the 33 LGA's in Oyo State, Nigeria. It is located at the northern part of the state and was created in 1989 by the military administration of general Ibrahim Babangida.
