= Adeyemi I Alowolodu =

Oyo ruler

Adeyemi I was the ruler of the Oyo Empire from 1876 to 1905. Starting in 1888 his realm came under increasing British control, with Oyo's independence clearly ending by 1896. He was the Alaafin during the 16 years Yoruba civil war, which went on from 1877 to 1893.

== Peace treaties and diplomacy ==
Adeyemi was in a crucial part of the Oyo Empire, when it was collapsing, during the Kiriji civil War, Dahomey aggression, and Sokoto Caliphate expansion. Dahomey laying to the west of Oyo, made it a subject to constant raids. Adeyemi started creating multiple treaties, and alliances, with the British like King Adeyemi Letter To The British Empire, and the treaty of 1888, to bring the Oyo empire under British protection.
