= Gaha =

Oyo noble and military leader

Bashorun Gaha (or Ga'a) was a nobleman and Prime Minister/head of the Oyo Mesi (kingmakers) in the old Oyo Empire during the 18th century. From 1650 to 1750, Oyo Empire was at the pinnacle of its greatness, peace, prosperity and wealth. The Empire had expanded to the utmost part covering the river Niger in the north; part of Tapa and Bariba kingdoms in the East of the lower Niger; towards the South by the seacoast and the West including Popos and Dahomey. Thousands of provincial officials (called Ajele) were appointed to administer all the conquered kingdoms and report to the Alaafin who gloried in his majesty and power. Women, men, young and old sang his praises. Then internal struggles for power began the rapid acceleration of the Empire disintegration and total collapse.

In 1754, Gaha was named the Basorun of Oyo. He was a descendant of the famous Basorun Yau Yamba. He was well-loved by his people because of his many war victories and the protections he provided to the people against cruel and despotic rulership of the Kings. He was believed to possess potent medicinal powers and charms. But Gaha coveted all the powers and responsibilities of Oyo state to himself; all the tributes were paid to him, and he appointed his kindreds as Ajeles to administer the provinces. He held the post during the reigns of 5 consecutive imperial Alaafins, and was instrumental to the military conquests during their time. Renowned for his juju prowess, he deposed or was responsible for the death of 4 of these Alaafins before being subdued by Alaafin Abiodun (who ruled c. 1774–1789) via trickery and betrayal by his generals. The following were the Kings:

== Labisi ==
Labisi was nominated to the vacant throne of Oyo. On the 17th day of his reign, Gaha became the Basorun and immediately usurped the powers and responsibilities of the King. He committed several atrocities against the Oyo kingdom. He put to death many of Labisi's friends and supporters. The King was not allowed into his Palace nor to sit on the throne. The king had no choice but to commit suicide.

== Awonbioju alias Oduboye ==
After the death of Labisi, Gaha installed prince Awonbioju and demanded homage from him. 130 days after his installation, Basorun Gaha demanded the king to prostrate before him. When the king refused to do this, he murdered him.

== Bebe Festival ==
Bebe festival was a celebration of a jubilee or the golden age of the king's reign. This rare festival spanned three years. During the festival, everyone, rich or poor, high and low had the freedom of speech and expression without fear of accusation of sedition or treason. No riots or any provocative acts were permitted during the 3-year period of the festival. No one was prosecuted. The king's Ilaris were hardly seen on duty; and there was no need to give them referend if came in contact. No tolls: no tribute paid; everyone appeared in their best costume and dress. All the Provincial kings and chiefs in all the countries came to Oyo to offer congratulations to the King bearing gifts and presents. The King's compound and market were decorated with colorful clothing manufactured locally or from foreign countries.

But Bebe festival was always accompanied with two human sacrifices to each previous King, from Oduduwa onwards. Many animals were also slaughtered for the King and his courtiers to dance on as the highest level of worship and thanksgiving. According to the Samuel Johnson, “The Bebe is sometimes termed Iku or funeral rites, as it intended to mark the close of a long reign, from the fact that the few Kings who celebrated it died a short time after,”

== Agboluaje ==
Agboluaje was installed as Alafin of Oyo after the death of King Awonbioju. He was a very tall and handsome Prince who avoided any confrontations with Basorun Gaha. King Agboluaje decided to celebrate Bebe to commemorate the peace and tranquility in the Oyo Empire. Elewi-odo, a Popo King and a close friend of Alafin of Oyo, came visiting due to the Bebe festival. Elewi-odo's kingdom was around the coastal area which gave him access to expensive European manufactured clothing and articles of which he shared with Alafin. A big reception was thrown for him at which the Oyo citizens became jealous and angry that Elewi-odo outdressed their King. Basorun Gaha was also inconsolable over the matter even after entreaties from King Agboluaje, who had begged, “Everyone, is allowed by custom to appear at Oyo during Bebe in his best, how much more should a king do so? His action in this matter is pardonable and therefore, should be overlooked.” But Gaha would hear none of this and he declared war. Having been forewarned, Elewi-odo crossed the Esuogbo river and escaped to the Tapa country. Unaware of his friend's narrow escape King Agboluaje poisoned himself and died before his emissaries arrived back.

== Majeogbe ==
Majeogbe became king after the death of Agboluaje. Since he was already aware of terror unleashed by powerful and influential Gaha, he was determined to rid himself. He fortified himself with charms. But Gaha's grip on the empire affairs was palpable as he appointed his sons, friends, family members and cronies to administer all important major towns. All the tributes of those towns and surroundings were paid directly to them and Gaha and not to the King. These Gaha's appointees were ruthless and oppressive against the people. They committed violent murders, seizures of innocent citizens who were sold into slavery. All these resulted in betrayal and loss of the support he had from the people. Gaha and his children claimed all powers of governance to themselves with the king in constant fear, knowing that his fate was in the hands of the Basorun. After several nocturnal attempts on Gaha's life, he succeeded in poisoning him, resulting in Gaha becoming crippled in both legs (although this was hidden from the populace). The death of Majeogbe came when one of his sons was involved in altercations in one of the towns where Gaha held sway. Basorun Gaha was so unforgiving of this, that he decided the King had to pay with his life for his son's offense.

== Abiodun (Adegoolu) ==
After the death of Majeogbe, Abiodun was installed the new Alafin of Oyo empire through the influence of Gaha. He was a dark, tall, and slender man. He was a very unassuming and comely man. He would go to Basorun Gaha every morning to pay homage for which he would receive presents. King Abiodun continued this for many years that, according the Reverend Samuel Johnson,‘…even the Basorun himself was becoming tired of this abject submission, and wanted but a decent pretext for which he might kill him, just for a change! This man of blood was often heard to say “who taught this King to be so wise? These daily presents are getting to be too heavy a charge on my exchequer now.”

All the powers and responsibilities were coveted by Gaha but his children overbearing deprived him of wealth from the subject kingdoms. So he asked his medicine men to make charms so he could get a lot of cowries. Somehow a fire broke out and destroyed his house and properties. Given the fact that he had power, influence, and the fear of him many people, from Alafin down to commoners, brought resources to repair and rebuild his losses. He became engulfed in abundant wealth. Yet, Basorun Gaha, was still looking for ways to kill the Alafin.

Therefore, King Abiodun secretly visited, his namesake, Adegolu, the Bale of Akala in a satellite town, whom he told “…I am come to confer with you upon the present crises, how to rid the throne of Oyo of the great usurper, the King maker and King destroyer. You know very well, that in all the 6600 towns and villages of the Yoruba kingdom, Gaha and his sons have the dominant rule.” Both went to inform the Kakanfo (Yoruba supreme military commander), Oyabi at Ajase. The message was secretly passed to all the major kings and provincial war chiefs in the countries.

In 1774, attacks were unleashed against all children of Gaha in those kingdoms. A few of them escaped to satellite countries. Ojo Agunbanbaru ran to the Bariba country. They won over Olubi, Gaha's brother by promising to invest him with Basorun title to turn against him. The invaders led by Kakanfo Oyabi and Alafin Abiodun by his side came to Oyo ile with the warriors who met ferocious fight from Basorun Gaha and his army. At last, after several deaths on both sides, the invaders won and captured Gaha, who was thoroughly humiliated and all entreaties by him to have his life preserved fell out. All his properties were destroyed. He was hanged till he died.

After the death of Gaha, all the properties of generations of great warriors of Oyo Empire who were perceived as Abiodun's enemies were destroyed to prevent any act of sabotage or coup against Abiodun. This marked the clear beginning of the loss of the military powers and glory of Oyo Empire, but it would take another sixty years for a complete collapse.

Two years after the death of Gaha, Abiodun invited Oyabi, the Kakanfo, to Oyo to honor him; but he was so stricken in health that he died on his way. Abiodun lived until his old age. Peace and prosperity reigned, and Oyo Empire flourished. King Abiodun died in 1789. Kangidi succeeded Gaha as the Basorun of Oyo.

== In popular media ==
- House of Ga'a
