= Orompoto =

First female Alaafin of the Oyo Empire

- Born: 16th century Oyo Empire (present-day Nigeria)
- Citizenship: Yoruba
- Occupation: Alaafin of Oyo
- Known for: First female Alaafin of Oyo; cavalry innovations; victory against Nupe (1555)
- Title: Alaafin of Oyo
- Predecessor: Eguguojo
- Successor: Ajiboyede

Ajiun Orompotoniyun, better known as Orompoto (also spelled Oronpoto) was the first female Alaafin of the Oyo Empire in West Africa. The empire of which she ruled is located in what is modern day western and north-central Nigeria and part of the Benin Republic.

== History ==
Orompoto was the sister of her predecessor, Eguguojo. She became the first woman to become King of Oyo Orompoto assumed the throne because there was no male successor within her family at the time. She helped drive the Nupe from Oyo in 1555. Orompoto lived in the 16th century.

Orompto was the second Oyo monarch to reign in the new capital of Igboho. Some oral traditions hold that she was miraculously transformed into a man before assuming the throne there.

Orompoto used horses extensively in military battles and may have obtained them from Borgu. She was reportedly masterfully skilled on horseback, and created a specialized order of cavalry officers within her army that were subject to the Eso Ikoyi. The first of its kind, the cavalry was a force to be reckoned with in the various wars with Oyo's enemies. Considered a skillful and valorous warrior herself, she is said to have distinguished herself at the Battle of Illayi. While fighting her enemies there, she lost three war chiefs in quick succession, titleholders that are known as Gbonkas in Oyo. The third of them is believed to have fallen with his face locked in an unnerving grin. The enemies thought that he was still alive and was making a mocking gesture, and were overwhelmed by what they considered to be their inability to best the Oyo Gbonkas. They abandoned the battlefield thereafter, and the Oyo later claimed victory.

She was succeeded by Ajiboyede after her death in the Battle of Ilayi, making her the first Alaafin to die in battle.
