= Igboho =

Town in Oyo State, Nigeria

Igboho Igboho-Okeogun
- Town
- Nicknames: Igboho m'ore, ọmọ alagbado ode
- Motto: No gree no surrender
- Location in Nigeria
- Coordinates: 8°50′N 3°45′E
- Country: Nigeria
- State: Oyo State
- LGA: Orelope
- Established: 16th Century

Government
  - Governor: Engr. Seyi Makinde
- Elevation: 445 m (1,460 ft)

Population (2024)
  - Total: 400,000
  - Ethnicities: Yoruba
  - Religions: 45% Christianity 53% Islam and 2% Traditional Religion
- Time zone: UTC+1 (WAT)

Oyo-Igboho is a town in Oyo State, Nigeria with population around 136,000. It is the headquarters of the Orelope Local Government Area.

== History ==
Igboho was founded by Alaafin Eguguojo as the capital of the Oyo Empire in the 16th century while the Oyo had been driven from their previous capital of Oyo-Ile by their Nupe enemies. It had strong natural defenses and was surrounded by triple walls, allowing the Oyo to resist the Nupe. It remained the Oyo capital for Egungunoju's successors until Oyo-Ile was reoccupied by Abipa. Òyó Igboho is hosted four Alaafins and they are buried in Igbo Oba beside First Baptist Church, Obaago, the Igbo-Oba is monitored and supervised by the Aare of Igboho. Igboho people are very peaceful and loving, The ALEPATA of Igboho is the paramount ruler of the town and he is in council with Onigboho of Igboho, Are of Igboho, Onaonibode of Igboho, Bonni of Igboho, Alomo of Igboho, Akasa of Igboho, Atemo of Igboho, Agbedan of Igboho and others Some of the quarters in the community includes : Obaago, Modeke, Ago-IgiIsubu, Jakuta, Waala, Oke Igboho, Owindin, Oke Akasa, Isalẹ Atemo, Idi elegba, Akitipa among others. The town has a town hall situated in Owode, a Radio Station brought by Emeritus Professor Dibu Ojerinde at Owode too as well, First Central Mosque in the town is at Oja-oba Modeke, Igboho while the First ever Church is First Baptist Church, Obaago, Igboho (Est. 1922) with Rev. Dr. S A. Adediran as the Pastor. Igboho is well represented both home and abroad with the First Nigerian Professor of tests and measurements coming from the town, Professor Dibu Ojerinde.

== Religion ==
Igboho, like many other Yoruba towns and cities, is occupied by Christians, Muslims and the adherents of African Traditional Religious belief.

== Notable natives and residents ==
- Dibu Ojerinde, First Professor of Tests and Measurements in Nigeria and Africa as well as Former CEO, NECO, and JAMB
- Sunday Igboho Yoruba right activist
