= Onigbogi =

Onigbogi was a king of the Oyo Empire in West Africa who succeeded his father, the Alaafin Oluaso to become the 8th king of the Oyo.

According to some now challenged narratives as recorded by Samuel Johnson, his mother, Aruigba-Ifá left her hometown of Ota to be with her son and to serve in his office as an advisor. She brought along with her a sacred image of Ọrunmila, the deity of fate and Ifá divination, to protect her son and his kingdom. However, the Oyo masses rejected her proposal of worshipping the deity and she returned to Ota. On her way back to her hometown, she was received by Alado, who provided her with supplies to continue her journey, while she initiated Alado into Ifá and conferred the rites to initiate others in return for his kindness. In latter years, the Ifá deity became prominent in Oyo and so was Ado hills, the villa of Alado.

== Reign ==
During the time of Onigbogi, the Oyo empire and the gates of its capital were besieged with armies from the Nupe king. Though, the Yorubas and the Nupes had an amiable relationship during the time of Sango, the third king of Oyo, relationship since then had become strained. The Nupe army seized a large part of Oyo and later controlled the Oyo capital. Meantime, Onigbogi fled to a location in the land of the Borgus and there he died not being used to hardships incidental to the life of an exile; leaving his son Ofinran a refugee in a strange land. In the land of his exile, King Onigbogi made it a law that only 35 of the Esos should be absent from home at any time, leaving 35 for the defence of the city and country, the Tapa King having entered Oyo practically without any opposition. Ayangbagi Aro was the Basorun of this period

== Notes ==
- Samuel Johnson, Obadiah Johnson. The History of the Yorubas, From the Earliest of Times to the Beginning of the British Protectorate. p. 158
