= Ọranyan =

First Alaafin of the Oyo Empire

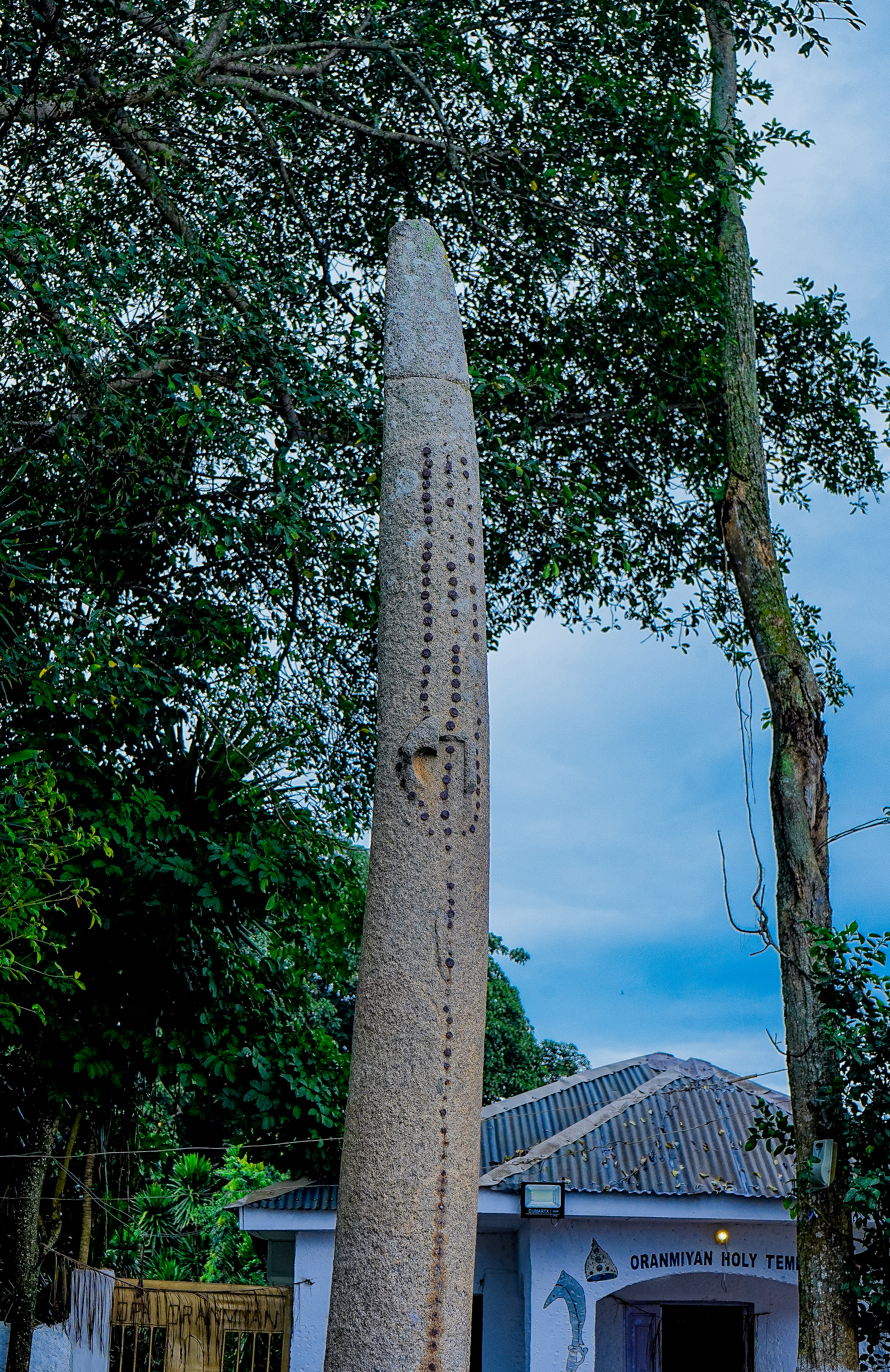
- Opa Ọ̀rànmíyàn, a 20-ft tall granite monolith in Ife, believed to be the staff of Oranmiyan.

Alaafin of Oyo, Ooni of Ife
- Reign: c. 31 years
- Predecessor: Obalufon II in Ife
- Successor: Ajaka and Shango in Oyo Ile, Eweka I in Benin, Obalufon II in Ife (2nd reign).
- Born: between 1100 CE and 1200 CE; Ile-Ife
- Died: between 1200 CE and 1300 CE
- Spouses: Erinmwinde of Egor; Torosi of Tapa (Nupe); Moremi Ajasoro of Offa; Others unnamed
- House: House of Oduduwa
- Religion: Yoruba religion

Ọ̀rànmíyàn, also known as Ọranyan, was a legendary Yoruba king from the Kingdom of Ife, and the founder of the Benin Kingdom and the Oyo Empire. Although he was the youngest of the descendants of Oduduwa, he became the prime heir of Oduduwa upon his return to claim his grandfather's throne.

According to early accounts, he founded Oyo as its first Alaafin in the year 1300 shortly after establishing a new dynasty in Igodomigodo. Following Oranmiyan's death, his family is fabled to have erected the commemorative stele known as the Staff of Oranmiyan - Opa Oranmiyan in the Yoruba language - at the place where their grandfather died. This obelisk is 5.5 metres (18 ft 1 in) tall and about 1.2 metres (3 ft 11 in) in circumference at its base. During a storm in 1884 about 1.2 metres (3 ft 11 in) was broken off from its top and it has fallen twice and been re-erected on each occasion. It currently stands in a grove in Mopa, Ile-Ife. Radiocarbon tests have shown that this royal marker was erected centuries before the start of the Oduduwa dynasty.

== Early life ==
Not much is known about Oranmiyan's childhood and most of the information about his early life comes from Ife sources. Most sources state that his father was Oduduwa. However, he is also sometimes called a man of two fathers - Oduduwa and Ogun - who supposedly both had relations with his mother Lakange Anihunka (a slave captured by Ogun in one of his war expeditions). His mother, in some oral versions, is said to come from Yagba or Nupe heritage.

The legend further compounds the controversy by stating that Oranmiyan was two-tone in complexion: half his body was light-skinned (like Ogun's), while the other half was ebony-black (like Oduduwa's). From a scientific perspective, this description may suggest he had vitiligo. Regardless, due to this, he was given the name Oranmiyan (or Oran ni Omo ni yan, which means "The child has chosen to be controversial"). His other name Odede signifies a great hunter, something which he was known to be throughout his early life in Ife. He was also a great warrior like his two fathers. He was the first Odole Oduduwa (youth of the house of Oduduwa) as he was a strong and outspoken prince of the Oduduwa lineage. His strength and talent in battle made him take up the role of defending Ife, which had no standing military at the time, as the first Akogun of Ife.

== Oranmiyan at Benin ==
A crisis among the administrators of Igodomigodo forced them to convene for a new ruler. Oranmiyan, sent by the Ooni of Ife, camped at a place called Use, meaning "making of a city" or "politicking". After making inroads, he began to rule Igodomigodo from there. His rulership as an Oba was foreign in the style of management and didn't go down well with some chiefs, so they sent agents to spy on him. All this made Oranmiyan declare that only a son of the soil could cope with the attitude of the Igodomigodo people. He called the land Ile - Ibinu, meaning "Land of Vexation".

On leaving Ile-Ibinu (later Ibini, and corrupted to "Benin" by the Portuguese), he stopped briefly at Egor where he took Erinmwide, the daughter of the Enogie (or Duke) of Egor, as a wife. As a result of their union, Oranmiyan crystallised his new dynasty, and his son Eweka would go on to properly establish the Benin monarchy. This dynasty is still ruling today.

== Oranmiyan at Oyo ==
After leaving Benin at about 1290, he moved north with his ever loyal entourage and settled close to the river Moshi (a tributary to the Niger River). He founded a city there, Oyo-Ile, which his descendants then expanded into the Oyo Empire. He engaged in war with the Bariba, his immediate neighbors to the north, and subsequently married Torosi, a Tapa princess, who became the mother of Sango Akata Yẹri-Yẹri. He also married Moremi Ajasoro.

== Oranyan festival ==
The first ever Oranyan Festival of Arts, Culture and Tourism was initiated in 2012 by his descendant and reigning successor, Oba Lamidi Adeyemi III of Oyo, who mandated that subsequently the festival was to be celebrated annually between the 8th and 15th days of September in Oyo, Nigeria.
