= Eguguojo =

16th century Alaafin of the Oyo Empire

Eguguojo (also known as Egunoju) was the Alaafin of Oyo during the sixteenth century. It was during his reign that the capital city was moved from Oyo Ile to Oyo Igboho (New Oyo), after a protracted battle with the Nupes and also as a result of internal fighting. Prior to the establishment of New Oyo, his grandfather had gone on an odyssey from Oyo Ile to escape threats from palace officials. He was succeeded on the throne by his sister Orompoto.
