= Ajaka =

Former Oyo emperor

Ajaka was an Oyo emperor (located within modern-day Nigeria) who was twice on the throne. His father was Oranyan or Oranmiyan and his brother, according to the historian Samuel Johnson, was Shango.

== Life ==
Ajaka originally ruled Oyo as a regent - and heir-apparent - of his father. After the death of his father, he eventually was replaced on the throne by his more war-like brother, Shango. He lived in a fierce and tumultuous age, but he was originally a man of a peaceful disposition which was perceived as weakness. The reason for this is not far-fetched: it seems the emperor was resolved to busy himself with palace affairs while simultaneously allowing his warriors more freedom than was traditional. This led to him being deposed and his brother being proclaimed emperor after a series of insubordinations from his local chiefs.

He was later called on to ascend the throne after the death of Shango, who, as a semi-legendary figure, became a deity of thunder. In his later years, he changed from being mild mannered to a warlike emperor, and was similar to his brother. The Basorun or prime minister and commander-in-chief during his second reign was Salekoudi, and it was in this period that the Yoruban drum, Ogidigbo, was introduced to Oyo. The drum was and still is used in great festivals where the Alaafin and the Basorun are present.

Ajaka had one child, a daughter, who died in a fire shortly after her marriage.
