= Oyo Mesi =

Privy Council of Oyo

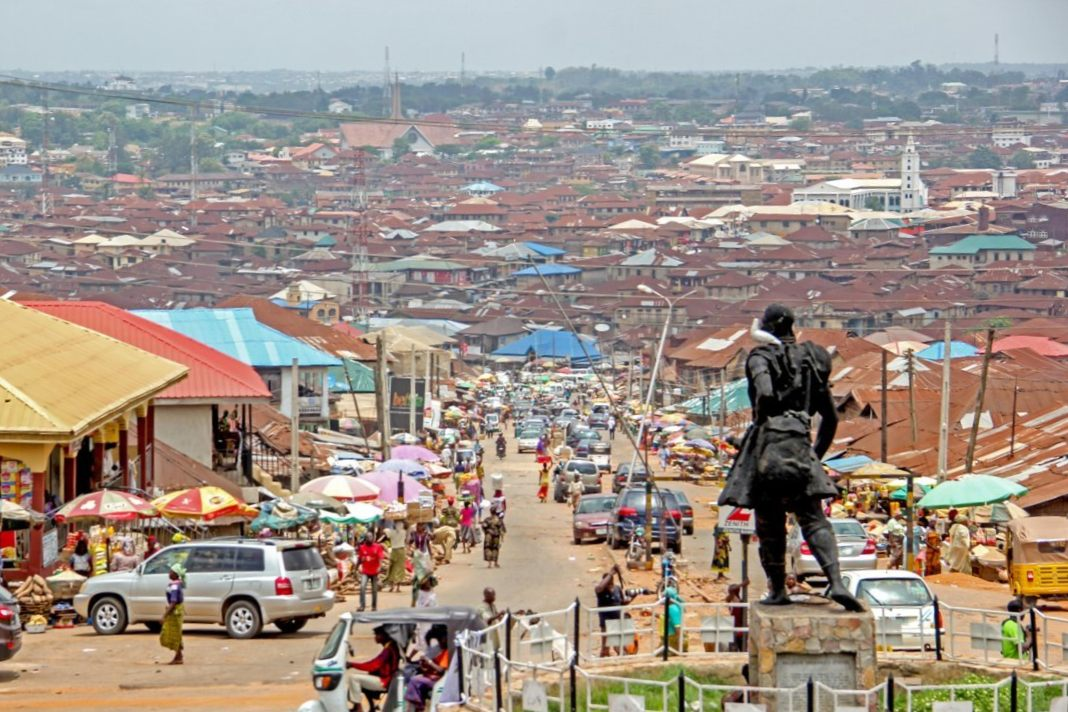
A statue of Oloye Oluyole of Ibadan, a Bashorun of the Oyo empire in the 19th century

The Oyo Mesi is the privy council of Oyo, a Yoruba traditional state in Southwestern Nigeria. It dates to the medieval period, when it served as the government of a powerful pre-colonial state that was known as the Oyo Empire.

== History ==
The Oyo Mesi was made up of the most powerful noblemen in imperial Oyo. No emperor, or Alaafin of Oyo, was capable of being enthroned in the capital without the prior consent of and performance of rituals by these seven titleholders. They were a ruler's principal advisors and sacred officiants, and also served a variety of judicial and administrative functions in his realm.

Led by the Bashorun (or hereditary "Prime Minister"), the Oyo Mesi were also expected to serve as a check on the despotic authority of each individual emperor that they crowned. In the event of any given reign having descended into tyranny, the Bashorun - after having put the matter to a vote in the Oyo Mesi previously - was expected to perform a traditional rite during which he would bring a calabash (which was to be either empty or laden with the eggs of a parrot) and present it to his monarch. On seeing that this had been done, the Alaafin was then obligated to essentially abdicate by way of ritual suicide shortly thereafter. After his burial, it was then left to the Oyo Mesi to begin the process all over again by replacing him with another member of the imperial family.

These wide powers that the Oyo Mesi had were checked in turn by the Ogboni, a subordinate council of noble elders that were sworn to the service of the Earth goddess. In matters of war, the Oyo Mesi were also supported by the Eso Ikoyi warrior caste, who they indirectly commanded on the battlefield by way of its field commander, the Are-Ona-Kakanfo.

This organizational structure survived the fall of the old empire during the Yoruba civil war in the 19th century, and exists now in the ceremonial monarchy of contemporary Oyo.

== Members ==
The following are the titles of the Oyo Mesi chiefs. Each has his own inalienable functions in the realm (although many of these responsibilities - such as the Samu's needing to commit ritual suicide - are now dormant), and all are collectively the Oyo equivalent of the Iwarefa in other Yoruba kingdoms:

- The Bashorun ("prime minister", hereditary within a single lineage that is related to the imperial family, historically styled His Supernal Highness according to the Reverend Samuel Johnson)
- The Agbaakin ("high priest of Oranmiyan", hereditary within a single lineage)
- The Samu ("sacrificial minister", hereditary within a single lineage; whenever an emperor died, the Samu was obligated to commit ritual suicide and thereby escort him to the afterlife)
- The Alapini ("high priest of Egungun", hereditary within a single lineage)
- The Laguna ("roving ambassador", hereditary within a single lineage)
- The Akiniku ("chief of defence staff", hereditary within a single lineage)
- The Ashipa ("mayor of the capital", hereditary within a single lineage that is descended from the ancestral rulers of Ago-Oja - the town that eventually became the present Oyo)

== See also ==
- Nigerian Chieftaincy
