= Oyo Empire =

Former empire in present day Nigeria and Benin Republic

Oyo Empire Orílẹ̀ Ọba Ọ̀yọ́ (Yoruba)
- c. 1300 – c. 1836
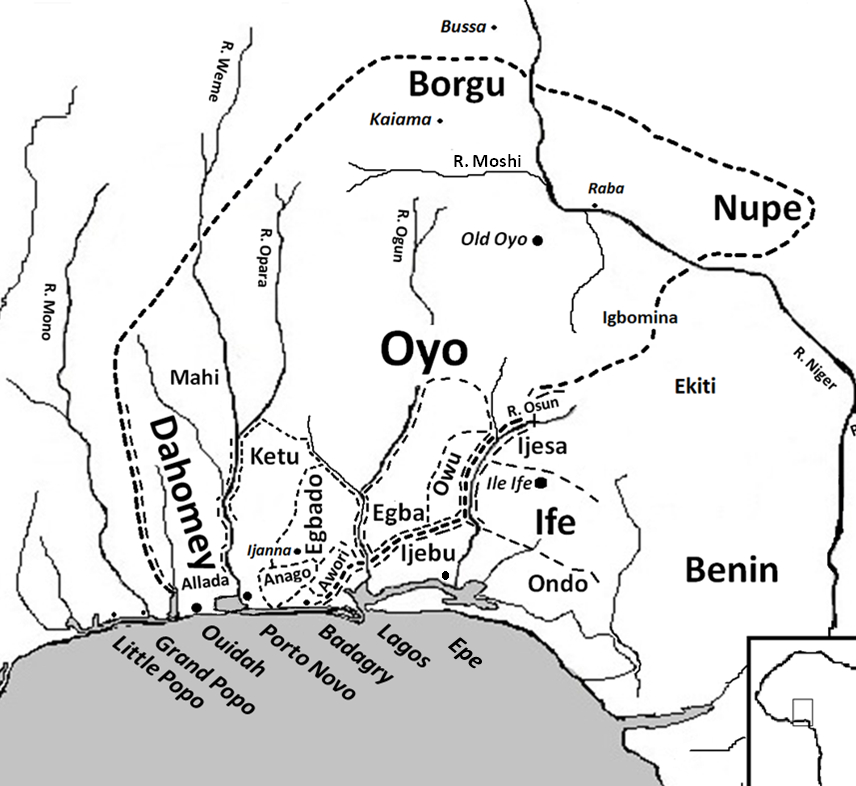
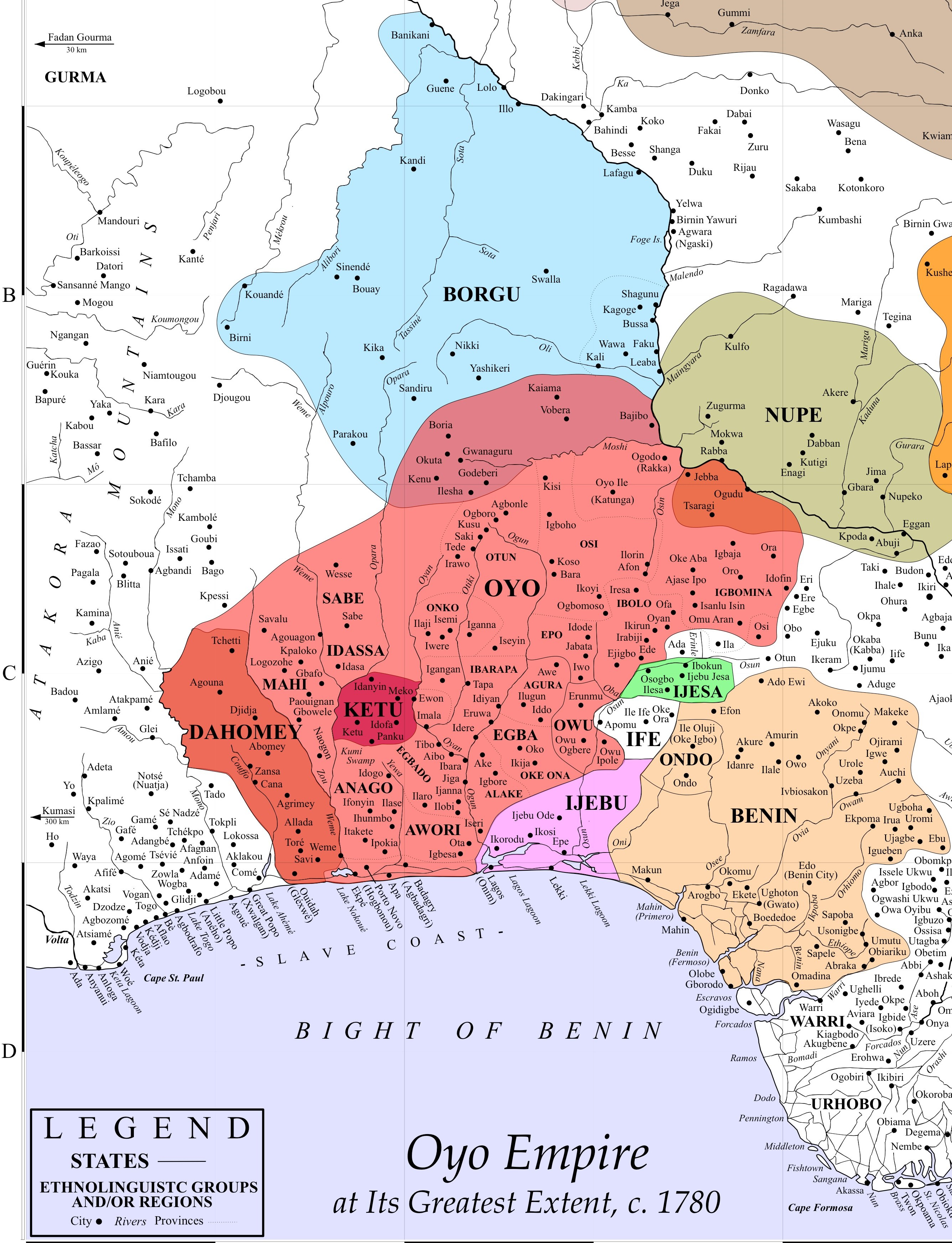
- Frontiers of the Kingdom of Oyo c. 1790. Oyo Empire during the 17th–18th centuries
- Status: Empire
- Capital: Oyo-Igboho (c. 1550–1615); Oyo-Ile (c. 1300-1535/1615–1835)
- Common languages: Yoruba
- Religion: Yoruba religion, Islam
- Government: Constitutional Hereditary Monarchy with Elective features.
- Alaafin (List)
  - c. 13th–14th century CE: Ọranyan
  - 1876–1905: Adeyemi I Alowolodu
  - 2025–present: Abimbola Owoade
- Legislature: Oyo Mesi and Ogboni

Area
- 1680: 150,000 km^{2} (58,000 sq mi)
Preceded by
Ife Empire
Succeeded by
Ibadan Republic
Egba United Government
Ilorin Emirate
- Today part of: Yorubaland · Nigeria · Benin
- A: Now a non-sovereign monarchy within Nigeria

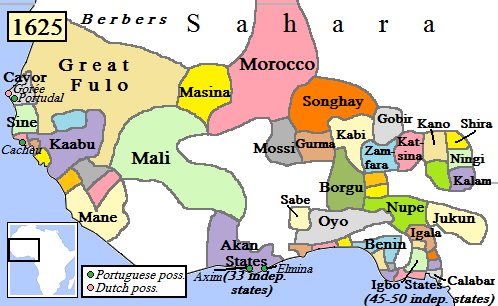
Oyo Empire and surrounding states, c. 1625.

House of Oranyan
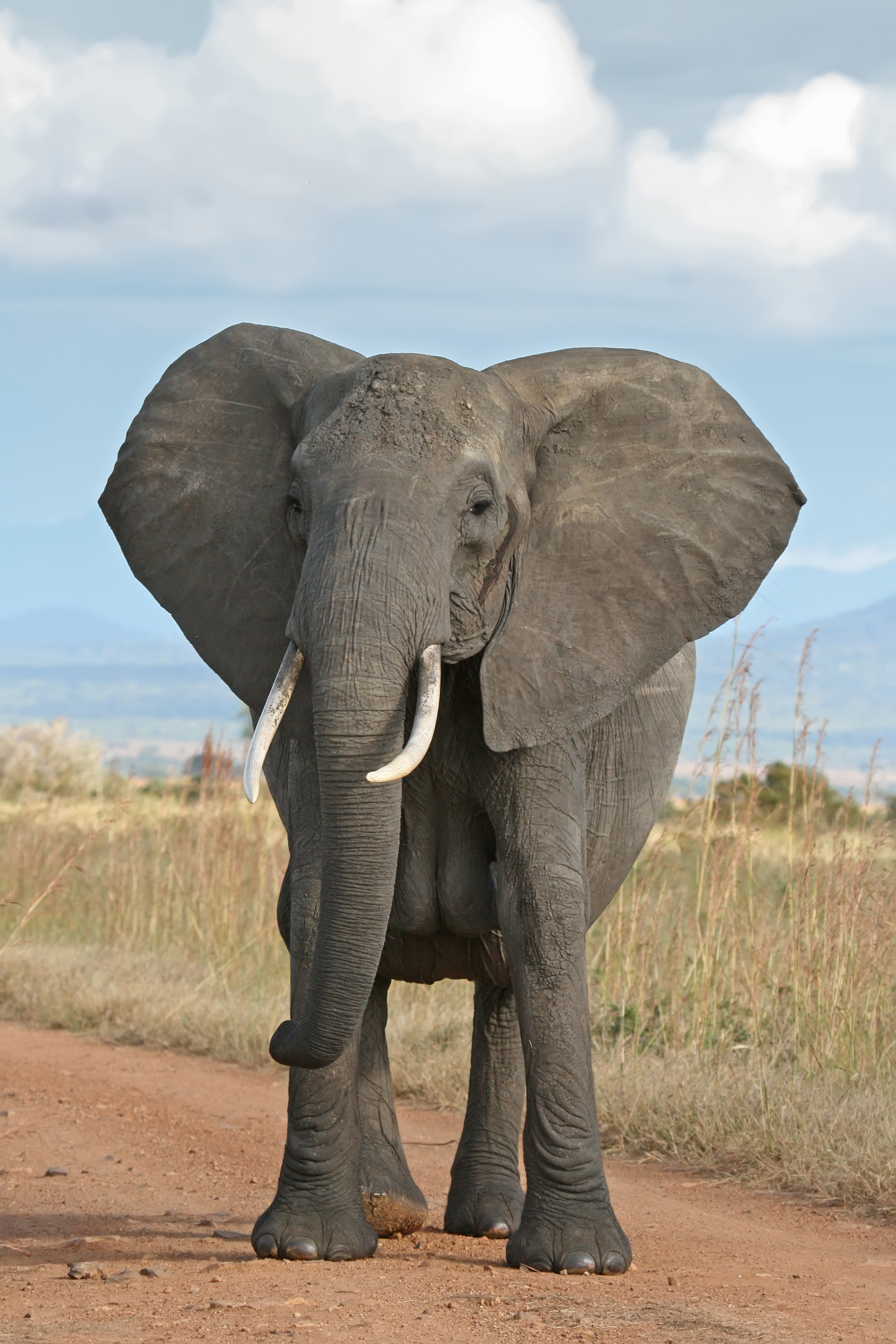
- Nigerian royal dynasty The Elephant (Ajanaku), totem of the kings and emperors of Oyo prior to Abiodun The veve of Ogun, war god of the Yoruba and totem of both the emperors and kings that have followed Abiodun and the various members of the Bashorun chieftaincy family that have served the state throughout its history
- Parent house: Oodua
- Current region: Yorubaland
- Founded: c. 17th century
- Current head: Abimbola Owoade
- Titles: Oba Alaafin of Oyo; Oba Obirin of Oyo; Iba Bashorun of Oyo; Iba Aare Ona Kakanfo of Oyo; Iba of Oyo; Oloye of Oyo; Omoba of Oyo; Oloori of Oyo
- Styles: Kabiyesi; Majesty; Imperial Highness
- Members: Abiodun; Oluyole; Candido da Fonseca Galvao
- Connected families: Ife royal family Bini royal family
- Traditions: Ifá; Christianity; Islam
- Motto: A kii r'oba fin l'alede Oyo, o ya e je a loo re Alaafin (Yoruba for "Oyo, Descendants of the Alaafin")
- Cadet branches: Alowolodu (Oyo); Agunloye (Oyo); Oluyole (Ibadan); Ona Aka (Oyo); Afonja (Ilorin)

The Oyo Empire was a Yoruba empire in West Africa. It was located in present-day western Nigeria (including the South West zone and the western half of the North Central zone) and Benin. It grew to become the largest Yoruba-speaking state through the organizational and administrative efforts of the Yoruba people, trade, as well as the military use of cavalry. The Oyo Empire was one of the most politically important states in Western Africa from the late-16th to the early 18th century and held sway not only over most of the other kingdoms in Yorubaland, but also over nearby African states, notably the Fon Kingdom of Dahomey in modern Benin to its west.

== History ==
=== Legend of origin ===
The legendary origins of the Oyo Empire lie with Ọranyan (also known as Ọranmiyan), the last prince of the Yoruba Kingdom of Ile-Ife (Ife). According to oral traditions, Ọranmiyan made an agreement with his brother to launch a punitive raid on their northern neighbors for insulting their father Oduduwa, the first Ooni of Ife. On the way to the battle, the brothers quarreled and the army split up. Oranmiyan's force was too small to make a successful attack, so he wandered the southern shore of the Niger River until reaching Bussa. There, the local chief entertained him and provided a large snake with a magic charm attached to its throat.

The chief instructed Oranmiyan to follow the snake until it stopped somewhere for seven days and disappeared into the ground. Oranmiyan followed the advice and founded Oyo where the serpent stopped. The site is remembered as Ajaka. Oranmiyan made Oyo his new kingdom and became the first "oba" (meaning 'king' or 'ruler' in the Yoruba language) with the title of "Alaafin of Oyo" (Alaafin means 'owner of the palace' in Yoruba). He left all his treasures in Ife and allowed another king to rule there. Prince Oranmiyan later returned to Ile-Ife where he reigned as an Ooni.

At one time, Oyo-Ile was at war with the Bariba of Borgu, who wanted to subjugate the new city then still under construction. Orangun Ajagunla of Ila, Oranmiyan's elder brother, stormed in with his men to assist. Not long after the war was won, Oranmiyan had a son, Ajuwon Ajaka, by Princess Torosi of the Tapa (Nupe); much later Arabambi (Sango) was also born by the same woman. It is believed that the name "Sango" was given by his maternal grandfather or that he adopted it from the local name for the god of Thunder. Either way, the royal family was devoted to the Spirits of Thunder (Jakuta) and War (Ogun).

=== Pre-Imperial period (13th century–1535) ===
The founding of Oyo is regarded as 1300, but this is only estimated through backtracking the chronology.

Oranmiyan, the first oba (king) of Oyo, was succeeded by Oba Ajaka, Alaafin of Oyo. Ajaka was deposed, because he lacked Yoruba military virtues and allowed his sub-chiefs too much independence. Leadership was then conferred upon Ajaka's brother, Shango (also called Sango), who was later deified as the deity of thunder and lightning. Ajaka was restored after Sango's death. Ajaka returned to the throne thoroughly more warlike. His successor, Kori, managed to conquer the rest of what later historians would refer to as metropolitan Oyo.

==== The Nupe occupation ====
Oyo had grown into a formidable inland power by the end of the 14th century. For over a century, the Yoruba state had expanded at the expense of its neighbors. During the reign of Onigbogi, Oyo suffered military defeats at the hands of the Nupe led by Tsoede. Sometime around 1535, the Nupe occupied Oyo and forced its ruling dynasty to take refuge in the kingdom of Borgu. The Nupe sacked the capital, destroying Oyo as a regional power until the early 17th century.

=== Imperial period (1608–1800) ===
The Yoruba of Oyo went through an interregnum of 80 years as an exiled dynasty after its defeat by the Nupe. They re-established Oyo to be more centralized and expansive than ever. The people created a government that established its power over a vast territory.

During the 17th century, Oyo began a long stretch of growth, becoming a major empire. The growth was related to a multitude of factors such as its agriculturally favoured geography, a rebuilt political structure, the industrial skills of its people, its Trans-Saharan trade network, and the large abundance of tributes it collected from kingdoms under its protection. At its heights, royals and citizens alike from many kingdoms sought out Oyo to solve disputes between polities within its reach. One such polity was Great Ardra, whose people — on one occasion — sought Oyo's aid due to harsh treatment of its citizens by the Ardrasian King. On another occasion, fleeing princes from the kingdom of Wémè, conquered by Dahomey, sought Oyo for redress. Oyo answered these requests with the force of its cavalry to such a devastating extent that neighbouring kingdoms became exceedingly fearful of Oyo.

The spread of Oyo's tributary reach came to include some of the coastal kingdoms involved in the Atlantic slave trade. Oyo never encompassed all Yoruba people, but it was the most populous kingdom in Yoruba history.

==== Reconquest and expansion ====
The key to the Yoruba rebuilding of Oyo was a stronger military and a more centralized government. Taking a cue from their Nupe enemies (whom they called "Tapa"), the Yoruba rearmed with armor and cavalry. Oba Ofinran, Alaafin of Oyo, succeeded in regaining Oyo's original territory from the Nupe. A new capital, Oyo-Igboho, was constructed, and the original became known as Old Oyo. The next oba, Eguguojo, conquered nearly all of Yorubaland. After this, Oba Orompoto led attacks to obliterate the Nupe to ensure Oyo was never threatened by them again. During the reign of Oba Ajiboyede, he held the first Bere festival, an event to celebrate peace in the kingdom. Celebrated regularly, it would retain much significance among the Yoruba long after the fall of Oyo.

Under his successor, Abipa, the Yoruba repopulated Oyo-Ile and rebuilt the original capital. Oyo attempted to take and conquer the Benin Kingdom sometime between 1578 and 1608, but failed as the mountains in Ekiti stopped the advance of cavalry units to attack Benin. A few kingdoms in Ekiti fell under Oyo, and Otun Ekiti served as buffer independent town between Oyo and Benin yet, Oyo continued to expand. The Oyo allowed autonomy to the southeast of metropolitan Oyo, where the non-Yoruba areas could also act as a buffer between Oyo and Benin. By the end of the 16th century, the Ewe and Aja states of modern Benin Republic were paying tribute to Oyo.

===== Dahomey Wars =====
The Oyo Empire began raiding southward as early as 1682. By the end of its military expansion, Oyo's borders would extend to the coast, some 100 kilometres (62 mi) southwest of its capital. It met little serious opposition until the early 18th century. In 1728, the Oyo Empire invaded the Kingdom of Dahomey in a major campaign dominated by its cavalry. Dahomey warriors, on the other hand, had no cavalry but many firearms. Their gunshots scared the Oyo cavalry horses and prevented their charging. The Dahomey army also built fortifications such as trenches, which effectively made the use of cavalry useless. The battle lasted four days, but the Oyo were eventually victorious after reinforcements arrived. Dahomey was forced to pay tribute to Oyo. The Oyo invaded Dahomey 11 times before finally subjugating the kingdom in 1748.

===== Later conquest =====
With its cavalry, Oyo campaigned over great distances. The Oyo army was able to attack defensive fortifications, but it was harder to supply an army, and they withdrew when supplies ran out. The Oyo did not use guns in its major conquests. The military waited until the 19th century to adopt them. In 1764, a joint Akyem-Dahomey-Oyo force defeated an invading Ashanti army. The victory among the alliance defined the borders between the neighboring states. Oyo led a successful campaign into Mahi territory north of Dahomey in the late 18th century. The Yoruba also made use of the forces of their tributaries, for instance, they accomplished a 1784 naval blockade of Badagri with an Oyo-Dahomey-Lagos force.

=== Zenith ===
By 1680, the Oyo Empire spanned over 150,000 square kilometers. It reached the height of its power in the 18th century. Despite its violent creation, it was held together by mutual self-interest. The government was able to provide unity for a vast area through a combination of local autonomy and imperial authority.

Unlike the great savannah empires, of which Oyo may not be called a successor since it was a successor of Ife, there was little if any Islamic influence in the empire. It is known that at least some Muslim officials were kept in Metropolitan Oyo, and men capable of writing and calculating in Arabic were reported by French traders in 1787. Muslim communities existed in several towns throughout the empire by the 19th century.

=== Decline ===
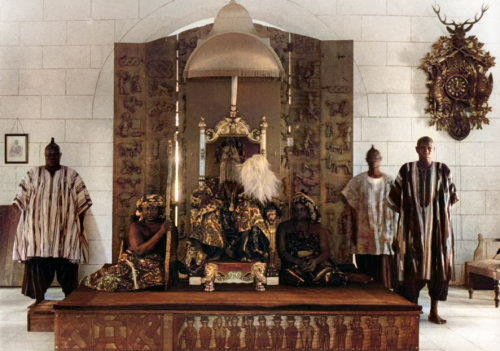
Reconstructed palace of Alaafin of Oyo circa mid-1900s, colorized.

Many believe the decline of the Oyo empire had started as early as 1754 with the dynastic intrigues and palace coups sponsored by the Oyo Prime Minister Gaha. In his quest for absolute power, Gaha conspired with the Oyo Mesi and probably to some extent the Ogboni to force four successive Alaafins to commit ritual suicide after they had been presented with the symbolic parrot's eggs. Between June and October 1754 alone, two Alaafins had been forced to commit suicide by Gaha. Because of this, Alaafin Awonbioju spent 130 days on the throne, while Alaafin Labisi only spent 17 days on the throne. Gaha's treachery was not ended until 1774 during the reign of Alaafin Abiodun, the fifth Alaafin he served. Gaha was subsequently executed by Abiodun but the instability that had been brought about by these intrigues had further weakened Oyo.

Alaafin Abiodun during his reign had also conducted failed campaigns against Borgu in 1783 and Nupe in 1789, losing the equivalent of 11 and 13 generals and their men respectively. Abiodun was subsequently murdered by his own son Awole, who subsequently ascended his father's throne.

The events that led to the secession of Ilorin began in 1793. Ilorin was a war camp headed by the Aare-Ona Kakanfo Afonja. Afonja took cause with Awole when the latter commanded him to attack Alaafin Abiodun's maternal home, Iwere-Ile. Afonja, being bound by an oath and also desirous not to fall under a curse from a previous Alaafin made to the effect that any Aare Ona Kakanfo who attacked Iwere-Ile (his paternal home) was to die miserably, refused to comply. A further cause was given in 1795, when Awole ordered Afonja to attack the market town of Apomu, a part of Ile-Ife. All Alaafins, due to the Yoruba belief that Ife was the spiritual home of the Yorubas, were previously made to swear an oath never to attack Ife. Afonja carried out Awole's order and sacked Apomu, but on the return of the army from the campaign he marched on the capital Oyo-Ile (which was itself a taboo), and demanded that Awole abdicate. Awole eventually committed ritual suicide.

After the death of Awole, there was a scramble for the throne by numerous contenders; some were reported to have spent less than six months on the throne; there was also a period of interregnum of almost twenty years where the various factions could not agree on a candidate. This power vacuum led to the ascendancy of powerful military and regional commanders like Adegun, the Onikoyi and Solagberu, the Otun Are-Ona Kakanfo. Shehu Alimi, a Fulani chief who was the leader of the growing Muslim population in Oyo, also rose to power at this time. These new elements had lost regard for the office of the Alaafin due to the various political wranglings and the lack of a central authority at the time; this situation eventually led to Afonja seceding Ilorin from Oyo in 1817 with the help of Oyo Muslims. In 1823, after Afonja had been killed by his erstwhile allies Shehu Alimi and Solagberu (who was himself later killed by Alimi's son), Ilorin became part of the Sokoto Caliphate. By the time Captain Hugh Clapperton visited Oyo-Ile in 1825 during the reign of Alaafin Majotu, the empire was already in a state of decline. Clapperton's party recorded passing numerous Oyo villages burned by the Fulani of Ilorin while Majotu had also sought the help of the English king and his friend, the Oba of Benin in putting down the Ilorin rebellion. Clapperton also noticed a shortage of horses, even though the Oyo were renowned as a great cavalry force; this might have something to do with the fact that most of the empire's soldiers and hence cavalry were stationed at Ilorin under the command of Afonja (and later Alimi's successors).

Ilorin then besieged Offa and started raiding, burning and pillaging villages in Oyo, eventually destroying the capital Oyo-Ile in 1835.

==== Loss of the Egbado Corridor ====
As Oyo tore itself apart via political intrigue, its vassals began taking advantage of the situation to press for independence. The Egba, under the leadership of a war chief called Lishabi, massacred the Ilari stationed in their area and drove off an Oyo punitive force.

==== The Dahomey Revolt ====
In 1823, Dahomey was reported to have raided villages that were under the protection of Oyo. Oyo immediately demanded a huge tribute from King Gezo for the unauthorised incursion, in response to which Gezo dispatched his Brazilian viceroy, Chacha Francisco Félix de Sousa, to the Alaafin at Oyo to make peace. The peace talks eventually broke down, and Oyo subsequently attacked Dahomey. The Oyo army was decisively defeated, ending Oyo's hegemony over Dahomey. After gaining its independence, Dahomey began to annually raid their neighbours and capture foreign slaves to trade with European and American merchants. The Yoruba people, situated between Oyo and Dahomey, were major targets in these slave raids.

==== Ago d'Oyo ====
After the destruction of Oyo-Ile, the capital was moved further south, to Ago d'Oyo. Oba Atiba sought to preserve what remained of Oyo by placing on Ibadan the duty of protecting the capital from the Ilorin in the north and northeast. He also attempted to get the Ijaye to protect Oyo from the west against the Dahomeans. The center of Yoruba power moved further south to Ibadan, a Yoruba war camp settled by Oyo commanders in 1830.

==== Final demise ====
Atiba's gambit failed, and Oyo never regained its prominence in the region. The Oba, otherwise called Atiba Atobatele, died in 1859. His first son, Adelu Alao Agunloye, became the Alaafin after him and ruled from 1859 to 1876, followed by his fourth son Alowolodu Adeyemi I, the third Alaafin to rule in the present Oyo, who also died in 1905. Others who ruled after Adeyemi I were Lawani Agogo ija, Ladigbolu I, Adeyemi II, Gbadegesin, and Lamidi Adeyemi, who died in 2022.

During the colonial period, the Yorubas were one of the most urbanized groups in Africa. About 22% of the population lived in large areas with populations exceeding 100,000, and over 50% lived in cities made up of 25,000 or more people. The index of urbanization in 1950 was close to that of the United States, excluding Ilorin. The Yoruba continue to be the most urbanized African ethnic group today. Prominent contemporary cities include Oyo, Ibadan, Abeokuta, Osogbo, Ogbomoso, and Ilaro, which are some of the major cities that flourished after old Oyo's collapse.

A remnant of the monarchy continues to exist as one of the traditional states of contemporary Nigeria.

==== Atlantic Slave Trade ====
In the late eighteenth century, Oyo came to rely too much on the trading of slaves with Europeans, so that when the trade was outlawed, Oyo suffered a loss of revenue and authority. This allowed many tributary states, such as Dahomey, to rebel and exert their own independence, at Oyo's expense. Oyo also became a target of the Fulani Jihad of 1804, which established the Sokoto Caliphate and caused frequent clashes with Oyo. This caused the Oyo Empire to fall into chaos and suffer a massive loss in territory, power, and influence. As a result, Yoruba people fell victim to the slave raids of neighbouring states, like Dahomey and Sokoto. This caused a wave of Yoruba captives to enter the Atlantic Slave Trade during the first half of the nineteenth century.

Examples of Yoruba people trafficked into the Atlantic Slave Trade, following the collapse of the Oyo Empire, include: Sarah Forbes Bonetta (Aina), Cudjoe Lewis (Oluale Kossola), Matilda McCrear (Abake), Redoshi, Seriki Williams Abass (Ifaremilekun Fagbemi), Remigio Herrera, Samuel Ajayi Crowther, Osifekunde of Ijebu, Scipio Vaughan, and John Baptist Dasalu.

Most enslaved Yoruba people, from Oyo, were brought to Brazil (where they were labelled Nago) and Cuba (where they were labelled Lucumi). Others can be found throughout Latin America, with a minority presence in Trinidad, Saint Lucia, Jamaica, and the United States, among other locations. Many Oyo slaves were also liberated from slave ships by the Royal Navy, as part of the Blockade of Africa, and repatriated to British Sierra Leone, where they formed the Creole (Krio) community alongside other liberated Africans. Examples include Samuel Johnson, along with his father and brothers, as well as their distant cousin Samuel Ajayi Crowther.

== Political structure ==
The Oyo Empire developed a highly sophisticated political structure to govern its territorial domains. Scholars have not determined how much of this structure existed before the Nupe invasion. After reemerging from exile in the early 17th century, Oyo took on a noticeably more militant character. The influence of an aggressive Yoruba culture is exemplified in the standards placed on the oba (king) and the roles of his council.

=== The Alaafin of Oyo ===
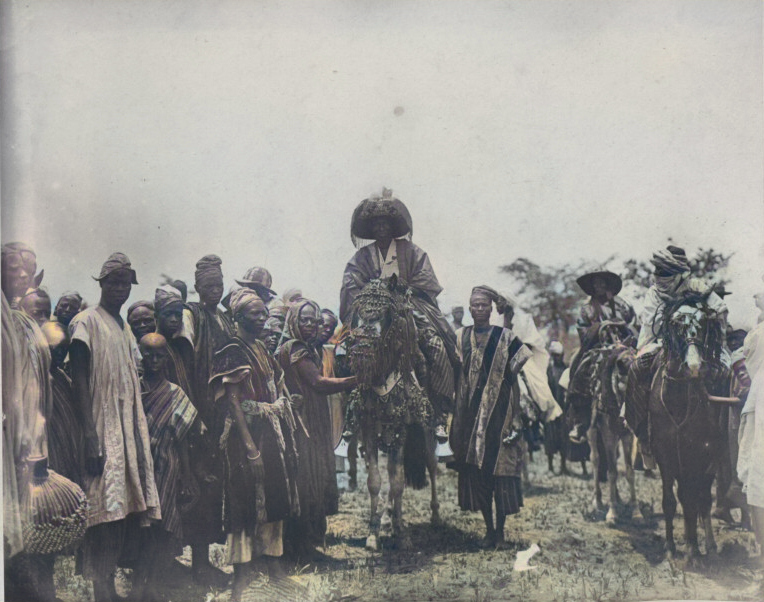
Alaafin Oyo c. 1910, colorized

The oba (meaning 'king' in the Yoruba language) at Oyo, who was referred to as the Alaafin of Oyo (Alaafin means 'owner of the palace' in Yoruba), was the head of the empire and supreme overlord of the people. He was responsible for keeping tributaries safe from attack, settling internal quarrels between sub-rulers, and mediating between those sub-rulers and their people. The Alaafin of Oyo was also expected to give his subordinates honours and presents. In return, all sub-rulers had to pay homage to the Oba and renew their allegiance at annual ceremonies. The most important of these was the Bere festival, marking the acclamation of successful rule by the Alaafin. After the Bere festival, peace in Yorubaland was supposed to last for three years. The king could not be disposed of but could be compelled to commit suicide if he was no longer wanted. This was done by sending Bashorun (The prime minister) to present either an empty calabash or a dish of parrot's eggs to him and pass a sentence of rejection, known as Awon Eniyan Koo (i.e. the people reject you, the world rejects you and the gods reject you also). According to tradition, the Alaafin was expected to commit ritual suicide thereafter.

==== The Bashorun ====
The Basorun was a key political office in the Oyo (often likened to the role of the Prime Minister and Chancellor of the Kingdom) during the 16th to 18th centuries, controlled by Ibariba families. Serving as the head of the seven highest-ranking non-royal lords in the Oyo Mesi council, the Bashorun played a crucial role in advising the king and representing non-royal interests. Their power was substantial, especially in the selection of a new king. From 1570 to 1750, several Basoruns had Ibariba or non-Yorùbá origins such as Basorun Magaji, Woruda, Biri, Yamba, Jambu, and Gaa.

The Bashorun's duties were closely tied to warfare, leading military campaigns for the state. Their position was second only to the alaafin.

==== Selection of the Alaafin ====
The Oyo Empire was not a purely hereditary monarchy, nor was it an absolute one. The Oyo Mesi selected the Alaafin. He was not always closely related to his predecessor, although he did have to be descended from Oranmiyan, a son of Oduduwa, and to hail from the Ona Isokun ward (which is one of the three royal wards). At the beginning of the Oyo Empire, the Alaafin's eldest son usually succeeded his father upon the throne. This sometimes led the crown prince, known as the Aremo, to hasten the death of his father. To prevent this occurrence, it became traditional for the crown prince to be made to commit ritual suicide upon his father's death. Independent of the succession, the Aremo was quite powerful in his own right. For instance, by custom, the Alaafin abstained from leaving the palace, except during the important festivals, which in practice curtailed his power. By contrast, the Aremo often left the palace. This led the noted historian S. Johnson to observe: "The father is the king of the palace, and the son the king for the general public". The two councils which checked the Alaafin tended to select a weak Alaafin after the reign of a strong one to keep the office from becoming too powerful.

=== The Ilari ===
The Alaafin of Oyo appointed certain religious and government officials, who were usually eunuchs. These officials were known as the ilari or half-heads, because of the custom of shaving half of their heads and applying what was believed to be a magical substance into them. The hundreds of Ilari were divided evenly between the sexes. Junior members of the Ilari did menial tasks, while seniors acted as guards or sometimes messengers to the other world via sacrifice. Their titles related to the king, such as oba l'olu ("the king is supreme") or madarikan ("do not oppose him"). They carried red and green fans as credentials of their status.

All sub-courts of Oyo had Ilari who acted as both spies and taxmen. Oyo appointed these to visit and sometimes reside in Dahomey and the Egbado Corridor to collect taxes and spy on Dahomey's military successes so that the Alaafin of Oyo could get his cut.

=== The Councils ===
While the Alaafin of Oyo was the supreme overlord of the people, he was not without checks on his power. The Oyo Mesi and the Yoruba Earth cult known as Ogboni kept the Oba's power in check. The Oyo Mesi spoke for the politicians while the Ogboni spoke for the people and were backed by the power of religion. The power of the Alaafin of Oyo to the Oyo Mesi and Ogboni depended on his personal character and political shrewdness.

==== Oyo Mesi ====
The Oyo Mesi were the seven principal councilors of the state. They constituted the Electoral Council and possessed legislative powers. Led by the Bashorun, acting as prime minister, and consisting of the Agbaakin, the Samu, the Alapini, the Laguna, the Akiniku, and the Ashipa, they represented the voice of the nation and had the chief responsibility of protecting the interests of the empire. The Alaafin was required to take counsel from them whenever any important matter affecting the state occurred. Each chief had a state duty to perform at court every morning and afternoon. Each also had a deputy whom they would send to the Alaafin if their absence was unavoidable. The Oyo Mesi developed as a check on the Alaafin's power, preventing the Alaafin from being an autocrat; they compelled many Alaafins to commit suicide during the 17th and 18th centuries.

The head of the council of Oyo Mesi, the Bashorun, consulted the Ifa oracle before the royal succession for approval from the gods. New alaafins of Oyo were therefore seen as being appointed by the gods. They were regarded as Ekeji Orisa, meaning "companion of the gods." The Bashorun had the final say on the nomination of the new Alaafin, his power rivaling that of the king himself. For example, the Bashorun orchestrated many religious festivals; he did this in addition to being commander-in-chief of the army, which gave him considerable independent religious authority.

Chief among the responsibilities of the Bashorun was the all-important festival of Orun. This religious divination, held every year, was to determine if the members of the Mesi still held favour with the Alaafin. If the council decided the disapproval of the Alaafin, the Bashorun presented the Alaafin with an empty calabash, or parrot's eggs, as a sign that he must commit suicide. This was the only way to remove the Alaafin because he could not legally be deposed. Once given the calabash or the parrot's eggs, the Alaafin, his eldest son the Aremo, and his personal counselor within the Oyo Mesi, the Asamu, all had to commit suicide to renew the government. The suicide ceremony took place during the Orun festival.

==== The Ogboni ====
The Oyo Mesi did not enjoy absolute power either. While the Oyo Mesi wielded political influence, the Ogboni represented the popular opinion backed by the authority of religion, and therefore the views of the Oyo Mesi could be moderated by the Ogboni. There were checks and balances on the power of the Alaafin and the Oyo Mesi and thus no one was arrogated absolute power. The Ogboni was a very powerful secret society composed of aristocratic freemen noted for their age, wisdom, and importance in religious and political affairs. Its members enjoyed immense power over the common people due to their religious station. A testament to how widespread the institution was is the fact that there were (and still are) Ogboni councils at nearly all sub-courts within Yorubaland. Aside from their duties with respect to the worship of the earth, they were responsible for judging any case dealing with the spilling of blood. The leader of the Ogboni, the Oluwo, had the unqualified right of direct access to the Alaafin of Oyo on any matter.

== Territory ==
At the beginning, the people were concentrated in metropolitan Oyo. With imperial expansion, Oyo reorganized to better manage its vast holdings within and outside of Yorubaland. It was divided into four layers defined by relation to the core of the empire. These layers were Metropolitan Oyo, southern Yorubaland, the Egbado Corridor, and Ajaland.

=== Metropolitan Oyo ===
Metropolitan Oyo corresponded, more or less, to the Oyo state prior to the Nupe invasion. This was the hub of the empire, where the Yoruba spoke the Oyo dialect. Metropolitan Oyo was divided into six provinces, with three on the west side of the Ogun River and three to the river's east. Each province was supervised by a governor appointed directly by the Alaafin of Oyo.

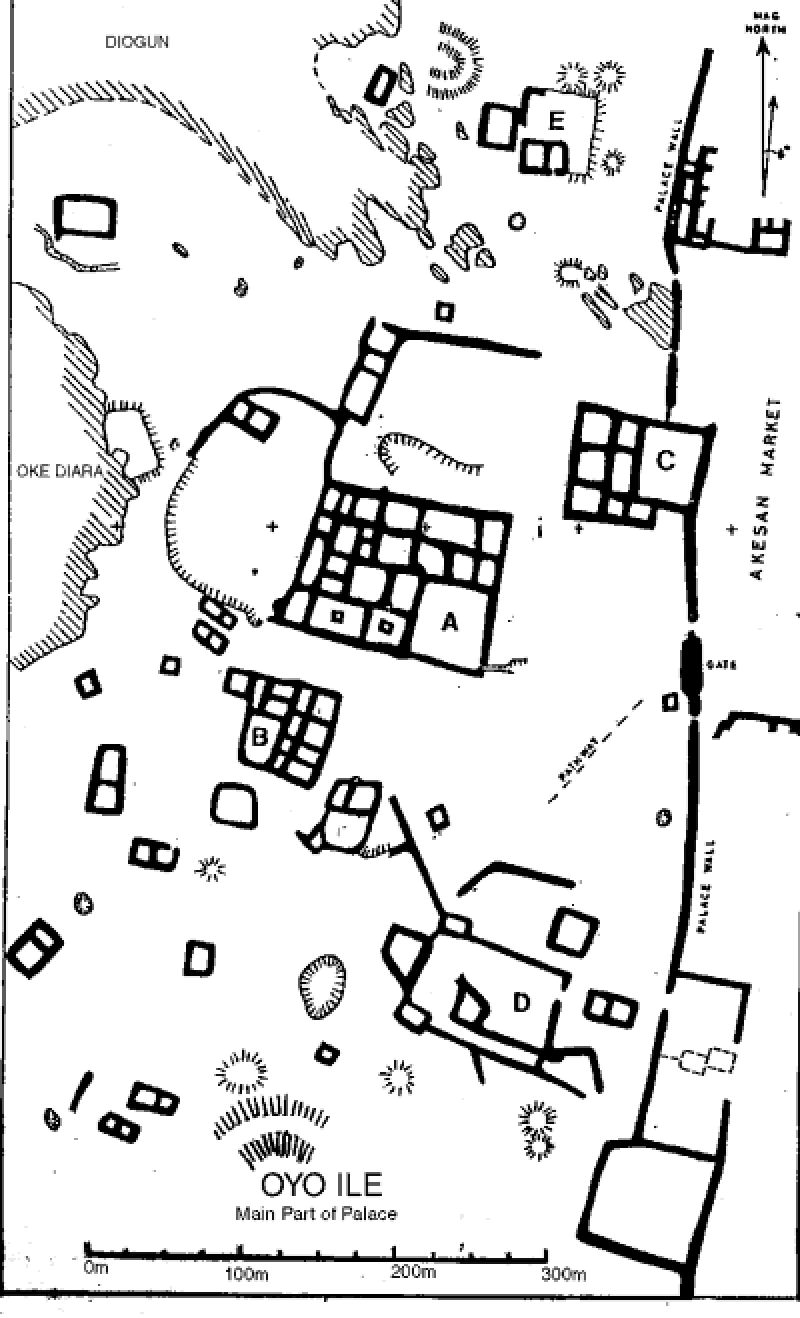
A Survey of Old Oyo Palace compound

The heart of metropolitan Oyo was its capital at Oyo-Ile (also known as Oya Katunga, Old Oyo or Oyo-Oro). The two most important structures in Oyo-Ile were the 'Afin,' or palace of the Oba, and his market. The palace was at the center of the city close to the Oba's market called 'Oja-Oba'. Around the capital was an enormous earthen wall for defense with 17 gates. The importance of the two large structures (the palace and the Oja Oba) signified the importance of the king in Oyo.

=== Yorubaland ===
The second layer of the empire was composed of the towns closest to Oyo-Ile, which were recognized as brothers. This area was south of metropolitan Oyo, and its Yoruba inhabitants spoke different dialects from that of Oyo. These tributary states were led by their own rulers, titled Obas, who were confirmed by the Alaafin of Oyo.

=== Egbado Corridor ===
The empire's third layer was the Egbado Corridor southwest of Yorubaland. This area was inhabited by the Egba and Egbado, and guaranteed Oyo's trade with the coast. The Egba and Egbado tributaries were allowed, like their Yoruba counterparts, to rule themselves. They were, however, supervised by Ajele. These were agents appointed by the Alaafin of Oyo to oversee his interest and monitor commerce. The lead representative of Oyo in the corridor was the Olu, ruler of the town of Ilaro.

=== Ajaland ===
Ajaland was the last layer added to the empire. It was the most restive and distant, and kept in line with threats of expeditions against it. This territory extended from the non-Yoruba areas west of the Egbado Corridor far into Ewe controlled territory in modern Togo. This area, like all tributary states, was allowed a fair degree of autonomy as long as taxes were paid, the orders from Oyo were strictly followed, and access to local markets was provided to Oyo merchants. The Oyo often demanded tribute in slaves. The tributary chiefs of other kingdoms sometimes made war on others to capture slaves for this purpose. Oyo was known to punish disobedience by wholesale slaughter of the erring community, as it accomplished in Allada in 1698.

== Military ==
There was a high degree of professionalism in the army of the Oyo Empire. Its military success was due in large part to its cavalry, its renowned archers, as well as the leadership and courage of Oyo officers and warriors. The people of Oyo had a reputation for being the "best bowmen in Africa", according to Hugh Clapperton. Starting from a young age, boys would practise and quickly become excellent with the bow. Skill refinements were culturally incorporated as games where individuals would take on the task of discharging arrows into a small hole from over 100 yards away. A feat many accomplished successive times. This deadly ability was in use both by Oyo's cavalry and the infantry. A geographic focus north of the forest ensured easier farming for Oyo, and thus a steady growth in population. This contributed to Oyo's ability to consistently field a large force. There was also an entrenched military culture in Oyo where victory was obligatory and defeat carried the duty of committing suicide. This do-or-die policy no doubt contributed to the military aggressiveness of Oyo's generals.

=== Cavalry ===
The Oyo Empire was one of the only Yoruba states to adopt cavalry; it did so because most of its territory was in the northern savannah. The origin of the cavalry is unclear; however, the Nupe, Borgu and Hausa in neighbouring territories also used cavalry and may have had the same historical source. Oyo was able to purchase horses from the north and maintain them in metropolitan Oyo because of partial freedom from the tsetse fly. Cavalry was the long arm of the Oyo Empire. Late 16th and 17th century expeditions were composed entirely of cavalry. There were drawbacks to this. Oyo could not maintain its cavalry army in the south but could raid at will. Despite its drawbacks, Oyo Empire amassed a cavalry force exceeding 100,000 horsemen, with a contingent of that size reportedly mobilized specifically for campaigns against the Kingdom of Dahomey. This formidable military capacity contributed significantly to Oyo's dominance and the widespread recognition of its power across West Africa.

Cavalry in highly developed societies such as Oyo was divided into light and heavy. Heavy cavalry on larger imported horses were armed with bows and arrows. Light cavalry on locally bred smaller indigenous horses, also known as West African Dwarf (WAD) horses, were armed with clubs. Chain mail armor was imported into Yorubaland from the north, and may have been worn by Oyo cavalrymen. Oral history records that a leading Oyo chief owned a "iron coat" which presumably, was chain mail in the 16th century.

=== Infantry ===
Infantry in the region around the Oyo Empire was uniform in both armour and armament. All infantry in the region carried shields, swords and lances of one type or another. Shields were four feet tall and two feet wide and made of elephant or ox hide. A 3-foot-long (0.91 m) heavy sword was the main armament for close combat. The Yoruba and their neighbours used triple barbed javelins which could be thrown accurately from about 30 paces.

=== Structure ===
The Oyo Empire, like many empires before it, used both local and tributary forces to expand its domains. The structure of the Oyo military prior to its imperial period was simple and closer aligned to the central government in metropolitan Oyo. This may have been adequate in the 14th century when Oyo controlled only its heartland, but to make and maintain conquest farther away, the structure underwent several changes.

==== The Eso ====
Oyo maintained a semi-standing army of specialist cavalry soldiers called the Eso, the Esho or, formally, the Eso of Ikoyi. These were 70 junior war chiefs who were nominated by the Oyo Mesi and confirmed by the Alaafin of Oyo. The Eso were appointed for their military skill without regard to heritage, although de facto dynasties of Eso were also known to exist. The Eso were led by the Aare-Ona-Kakanfo, and were famous for living by a warrior code that was comparable to the Latin dictum infra dignitatem.

==== Aare Ona Kakanfo ====
After Oyo's return from exile, the post of Aare-Ona-Kakanfo was established as the supreme military commander. He was required to live in a frontier province of great importance to keep an eye on the enemy and to keep him from usurping the throne. During Oyo's imperial period, the Aare-Ona-Kakanfo personally commanded the army in the field on all campaigns.

==== Metropolitan Army ====
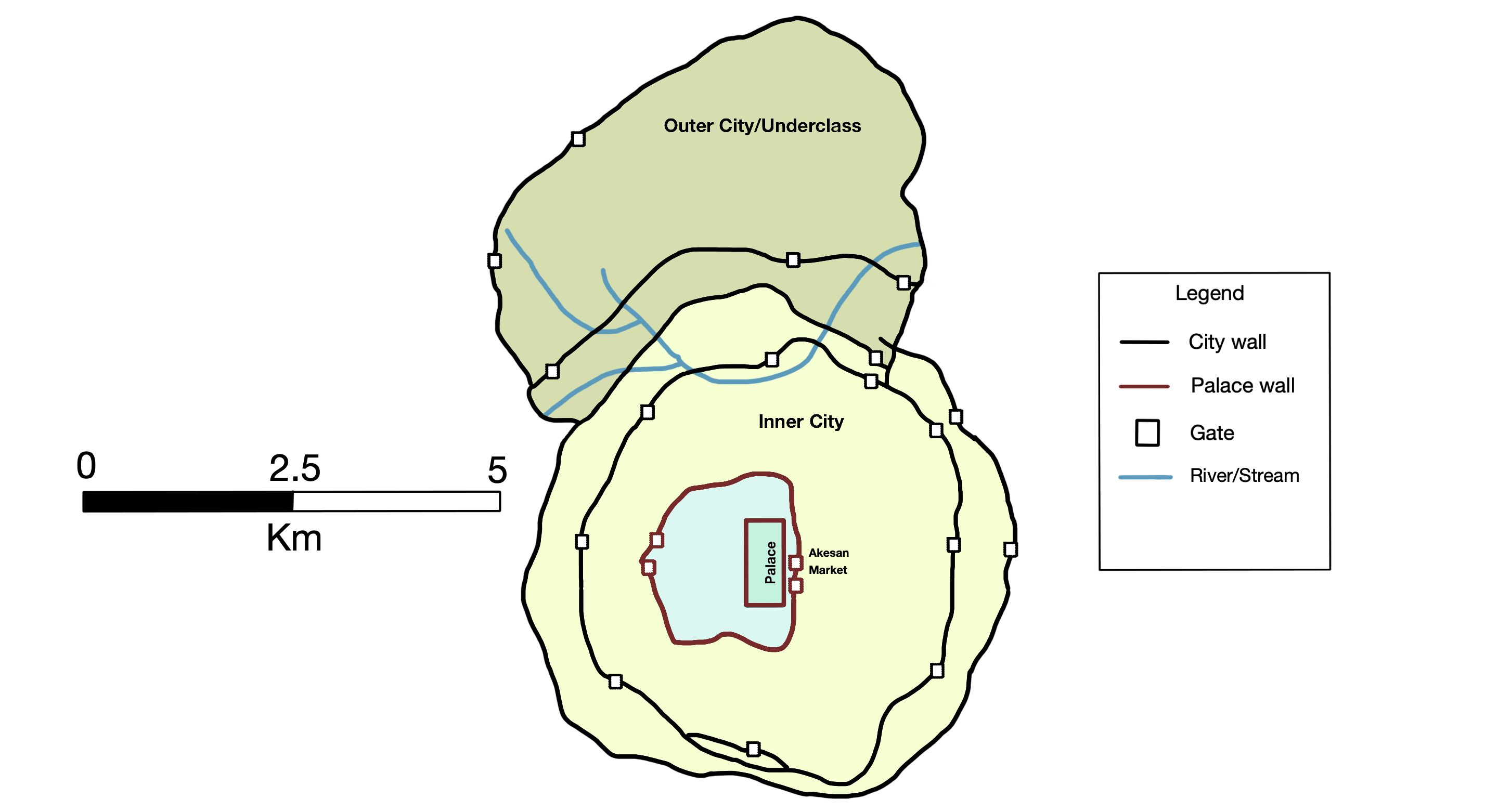
Mapping of The Old Oyo city walls, prior to collapse

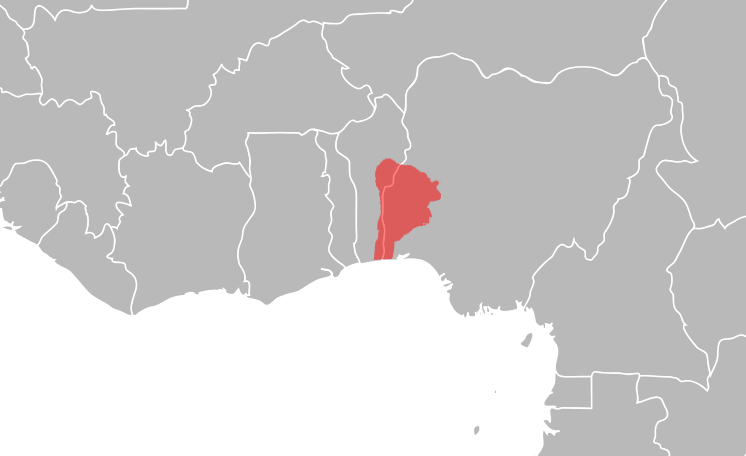
Oyo empire extent, 17th to 18th centuries

Since the Aare-Ona-Kakanfo could not reside near the capital, arrangements had to be made for the latter's protection in case of emergency. Forces inside metropolitan Oyo were commanded by the Bashorun, leading member of the Oyo Mesi. As stated earlier, Metropolitan Oyo was divided into six provinces divided evenly by a river. Provincial forces were thus grouped into two armies, under the Onikoyi and the Okere for the east and west side of the river respectively. Lesser war chiefs were known as Balogun, a title carried on by the soldiers of Oyo's successor state, Ibadan.

==== Tributary Army ====
Tributary leaders and provincial governors were responsible for collecting tribute and contributing troops under local generalship to the imperial army in times of emergency. Occasionally, tributary leaders would be ordered to attack neighbors even without the backing of the main imperial army. These forces were often utilized in Oyo's distant campaigns on the coast or against other states.

== Culture ==
=== Commerce ===
Oyo became the southern emporium of the Trans-Saharan trade. Exchanges were made in salt, leather, horses, kola nuts, ivory, cloth and slaves. The Yoruba of metropolitan Oyo were also highly skilled in craft making and iron work. Aside from taxes on trade products coming in and out of the empire, Oyo also became wealthy off the taxes imposed on its tributaries. Taxes on the kingdom of Dahomey alone brought in an amount estimated at 14 million US dollars a year. In pre colonial times, Esusu was a type of rotating savings and credit association among the Yoruba. Esusu was recorded to have been practiced in Oyo during the reign of Alaafin Abiodun in the 18th century.

=== Architecture ===
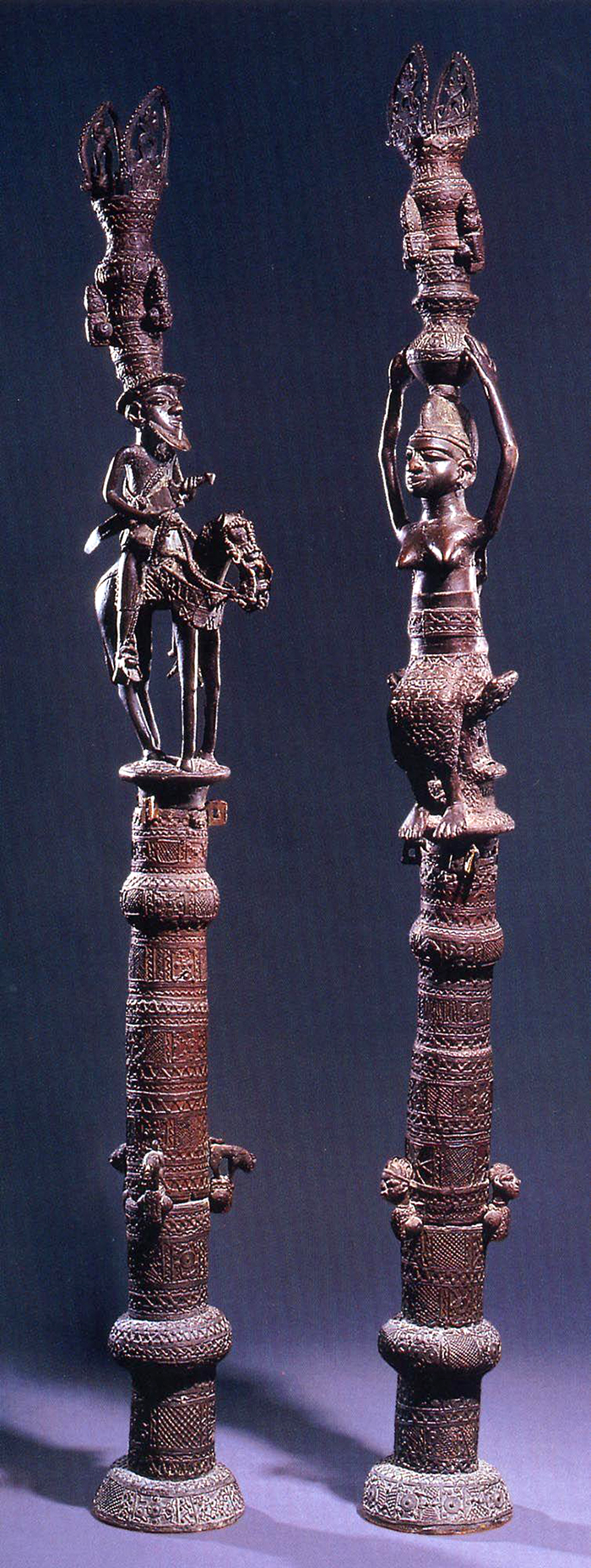
Old Oyo Bronze Pillars, 15th-18th century. (183cm, 186cm)

The architecture within the Oyo Empire, exhibited an intricate built environment. Elite residences in Oyo-Ile showcased a distinctive architectural style, highlighted by intricate sculptures that symbolized the status of the inhabitants. Sculptors adorned houses and compounds with finely carved wooden posts and bas-relief doors, often depicting narratives of significant events, asserting power, and immortalizing the experiences of the residents. However, the most intricate and elaborate architectural artworks were reserved for the temples dedicated to the deities. An exceptional example is the temple of Sango. The structure, perfectly square and approximately twenty yards on each side, featured polished, deep-red stained floors and walls. Hugh Clapperton called it "The largest and most fancifully ornamented of any of a similar kind in the interior of Africa."

In the surrounding provinces of the Oyo Empire, smaller replicas of the architectural artistry dedicated to Sango were established. For example, a temple in Ilaro was described as a large square building supported by round pillars, against which were set sculptures of men, some armed with sword and shield and others holding pistols. Clapperton noted the remarkable skill of the artisans, stating that some of their sculptural creations rivaled those he had seen in Europe in terms of delicacy.

The support pillars of the Oyo palace were made of brass and were measured to be around 2 meters in height. The roof of the Old Oyo palace in its heyday was said to held up with around 100 brass pillars in a long corridor before The palace was invaded and ransacked by the Ilorin Emirate in the 19th century. It is claimed that they were first erected during the reign of Alaafin Aganju around the 15th century, although some sources attribute them to have been cast between 1750 and 1780.

Doors were also intricately cast and crafted in oyo. A large iron door looted from Oyo was kept and passed down from Emirs, and an Alaafin from the 18th century was said to have "made seven silver doors to the seven entrances of his sleeping apartment".

Potsherd Pavements at Old Oyo have been dated from the 13th to 14th centuries.

=== Religious Cults ===
Toby Green notes that religion was deeply embedded in West African societies, where political power and religious authority were intertwined.This is illustrated with Alafin Abipa's founding of the Egungun and Ifa cults in the early 17th century and the development of the Sango cult in the early 18th century. Green further notes that religious innovations persisted throughout Oyo's history.

Egungun and Ifa remain crucial to Yoruba religious practice even in the 21st century. The importance of Sango for Oyo's royal slaves may help explain why he later emerged as a major deity for enslaved Africans in Brazil who practiced the religion of Candomblé.

=== Ethnic diversity in Oyo ===
After the Nupe crisis, Oyo grew a more diverse population. The Yoruba elements remained the dominant population in the reconstructed empire. Next to them in influence were the Ibariba, and joining this multiethnic nation were elements of Nupe, Songhai, and Mossi. The presence of Ibariba, Songhai, and Mossi facial scarification among the Oyo population provides evidence for this multiethnic and multicultural integration in the formation of the Oyo identity after 1570.

=== Symbology ===
Common symbols

Ìbọ̀, (Solomon's knot), a quasi-heraldic symbol of Yoruba royalty

Ìbọ̀ onígun mẹ́rin, (Quadruple Solomon's knot).

The veve of Ogun, war god of the Yoruba and totem of the Alaafins of Oyo

== See also ==
- Ijebu Kingdom
- Ondo Kingdom
- Ife empire
- Rulers of the Yoruba state of Oyo
- Oyotunji African Village
- History of Nigeria
