= Alaafin =

Title of the ruler of Oyo

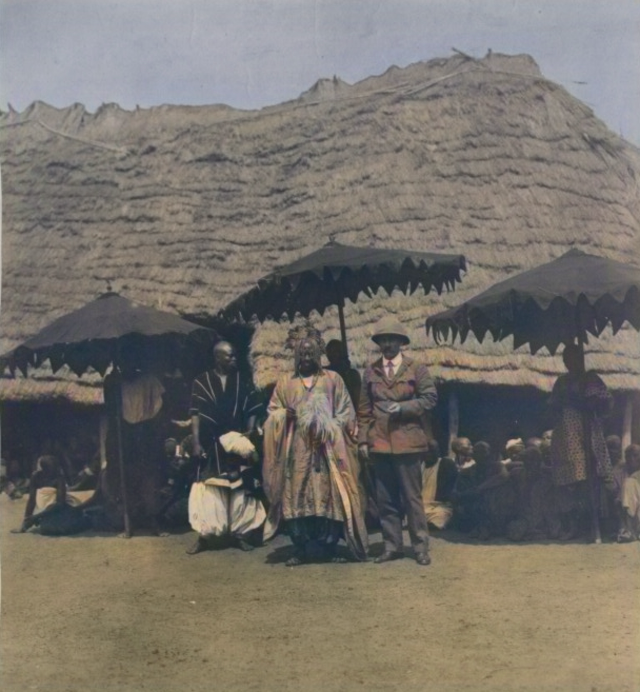
Alaafin Oyo and Sir Walter Egerton circa 1910 - Colorized

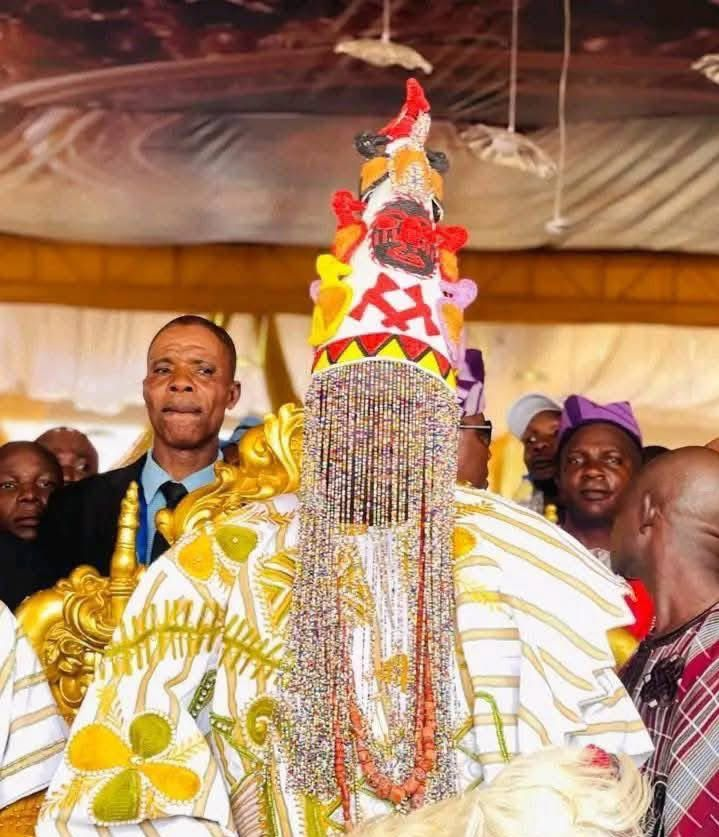
The 46th Alaafin of Oyo, HIM Oba Akeem Owoade I

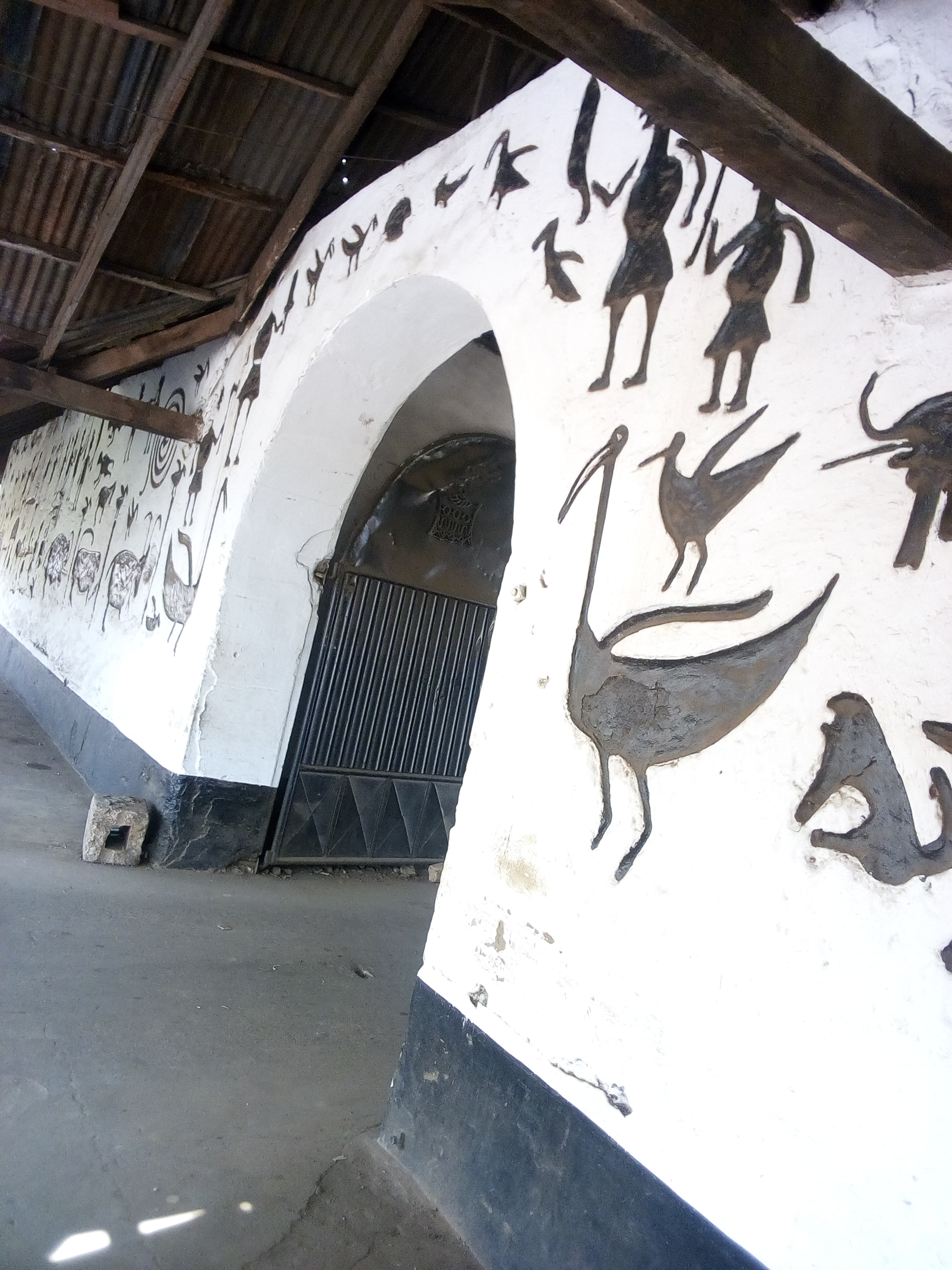
Outermost entrance to the palace of the Alaafin of Oyo called "Oju Abata"

Alaafin is the shortened version of Alawọfin (lit. one who owns the palace). It is a title and pre-nominal honorific for the supreme ruler of the Oyo Empire and of modern Oyo. The Alaafin of Oyo is also used commonly to refer to a powerful Yoruba monarch whose reign in the 17th to 18th centuries was vast. He ruled the Oyo Empire which extended from the present day Benin Republic to Nigeria originating from states in the South East and West to the North. The first female Alaafin was Oronpoto, who lived in the 16th century. The people under the Alaafin are Yoruba people and they speak the Yoruba language.

The Alaafin of Oyo, according to Yoruba mythology and history is said to have originated from Oduduwa the progenitor of the Yoruba race in present-day Oyo of West Africa. Alaafin is Emperor in the context of ruler of an empire. He ruled the Oyo Empire, which extended from the present-day Benin republic to Nigeria, originating from states in the South East and West to the North. The individuals under him are Yoruba people who speak the Yoruba language. Yoruba is widely spoken in various regions, such as Egba, Ijebu, Ekiti, Ijesha, Ile-Ife, and Eko, each with its own minor dialects.

In mythology and history, the first Alaafin of Oyo, Oranyan, is said to be the son of Oduduwa. He migrated from Ile-Ife to Oyo, where he became the king and laid the foundation for the Yoruba civilization. Ultimately, he returned to his origin, Ile-Ife, where he ruled as Ooni and eventually died.

The Alaafin and the Oyo Mesi formed the central government of the empire. Local provincial government was in the hands of Oba (if crowned head) or Baale (if not entitled to wear a crown). The relationship between the Alaafin and the Obas was a feudal one, that is for his rule and protection, the Obas, the Baales and chiefs of vassal states owed him certain obligations.

The present Alaafin of Oyo is His Imperial Majesty, Oba Akeem Owoade I who succeeded the late Oba Lamidi Adeyemi III, the 45th Alaafin. The style used for Alaafins is Imperial Majesty.

== See also ==
- Rulers of the Yoruba state of Oyo
- Oba
- Oranmiyan
- Ooni of Ife
