= Timeline of Yoruba history =

This is a timeline or chronology of Yoruba history. It contains notable or important cultural, historical and political events in Yorubaland, its constituent kingdoms and its immediate region as it relates to the Yoruba people of West Africa. Many of the dates, especially those from the periods before written history are approximates, and are always indicated when shown. Do not add events that are not notable to this timeline.

== 12th millennium BC ==
Year	Image	Event
12,000 BC (Stone Age)		Approximate time when the Iho Eleru man lived in present-day Yorubaland. Its remains would be discovered much later in 1965 alongside half a million stone tools near the village of Isarun as the only known Pleistocene era (Ice age) sample of a hominin fossil ever discovered in western Africa, 11.7–16.3 ka years old.

== 4th millennium BC ==
Year	Image	Event
3250 BC		By this period, the Proto-Yoruboid peoples had emerged as a distinct group out of a previously undifferentiated Volta-Congo group after the end of the 'big dry' in c. 3500 BC.

== 3rd millennium BC ==
Year	Date	Event
2600 BC		Radiocarbon dating of excavated charcoal samples obtained from layers between 1.90 and 2.01 meters deep at the Oke Eri grove in southern Yorubaland confirms the presence of human habitation and activity from an African late Stone Age (Bronze Age) population inhabiting the rain forest zone of south-central Yorubaland dating to this period.

== 1st millennium BC ==
Year	Date	Event
1000s BC		The Proto-Yoruboid peoples had demographically spread southwards and westwards from their Urheimat, a location suspected to be around the southwestern wedge of the Niger-Benue confluence. They establish several small-scale 'house societies' or clans throughout the forests, swamps and open grasslands of the region.
1000s BC	500 BC (Approx.)	The ancient settlement of Ufẹ (Ifẹ) was founded in this time period or earlier. It started out as a group of tiny hamlets or 'house societies' in a swampy depression surrounded by hills in the heart of the Nigerian lowland forests like its contemporary societies across Yorubaland emerging at about the same period. Ife would however grow to become the Yoruba premier city and one of Africa's most impactful states through the spreading of its systems of monarchy, society, culture and religion by way of kingdom founding migrations, forming societal nuclei throughout the regions between the lower Niger and Volta rivers.
300 BC		Human remains ("Itaakpa man") and other archeological evidence from the Itaakpa rock shelter and other associated sites; Abuke, Oluwaju and Addo, west of present-day Ife-Ijumu shows the presence of people and settlement in northeastern Yorubaland by this period. Materials recovered include; Pottery, Charred palm kernels, and Microlith tools. It is one of only four archaeological site in Nigeria (alongside Iho Eleru: [12,000 BC], Daima I: [550 BC - 50 CE] and Rop: [25 BC]) to have ever produced late stone age era human remains.

== 2nd century AD ==
Year	Image	Event
132 AD		Extensive Iron smelting in northeastern Yorubaland. Archaeological work at the Oluwaju rockshelter produces large quantities of iron-working related debris (tuyeres, iron slag, arrowheads, tools etc.) and other evidence of extensive bloomery type smelting dating to the period of 1840BP ± 125 years c. 1972, at a depth of 35cm. Further in situ materials recovered from the site show that iron related work likely began much earlier into the first millennium BCE based on samples excavated from deeper depths (83cm).

== 3rd century AD ==
Year	Image	Event
250 AD		By around AD 250, linguistic evidence indicates that Proto-Yoruboid had differentiated into at least three daughter languages: proto-Igala, proto-Itsekiri, and proto-Yoruba. Proto-Yoruba subsequently developed into the contemporary Yoruba language varieties.

== 7th century AD ==
Year	Image	Event
600 AD	Regional leadership titles	Obas emerge as the title for leaders presiding over the bigger sociopolitical group formations taking shape in central and northeastern Yorubaland as mega-houses. The roots of these newer polities lay in the earlier 'house-societies' or clans that had dominated society since at least the 4th-5th century BCE. In parts of the hilly Ekiti, Ijẹsha and Yagba regions, Ọwa (‘house leaders’) was in co-use. In the southeast, Ọlọja (‘community leader’) was the dominant terminology used for the emerging heads, while Olu (‘highest ranking’) was ubiquitous across the cultural region.
656 AD	Yorubaland in 600 CE	The historical site and pre Oduduwa Ife community of Orun Oba Ado was established. There, both locally produced Ifẹ HLHA Glass as well as foreign sourced soda-lime glass have been found occurring, demonstrating that Ifẹ may have been part of far reaching/extensive trade networks by this time period.

== 8th century AD ==
Year	Image	Event
700 AD	Pre-urban federation of Ifẹ	Thirteen mega-houses had formed in Ifẹ, the largest of which was Idita a.k.a. Iranje The initial thirteen mega-houses then entered into a confederal political agreement with rotational leadership as the first mini-state in Yorubaland. Some of the thirteen clan rulers included; Ọbaluru, Ọba ijio, Ọbawinrin, Ọbalẹjugbẹ and Ọbameri, among others, under the leadership of personalities like Ọranfẹ (Ọramfẹ) followed by Obatala. In this Pre-Oduduwa period, the crowns worn by these Obas were called Oro. They were simple head pieces made of straw, and were the precursors to the more complex, intricately decorated and heavily beaded Ade of Yorubaland, and later on, the Edo. The Ide Oro is still worn by high ranking chiefs in modern day Ife.
800 AD ~		The current Yoruba language dialectal clusters had become differentiated into three of its current five groupings with the exception of northwestern and southwestern Yoruba which seem not to have developed yet at this time period. They had also become the largest integrated cultural group in West Africa south of the Niger river in terms of population size and geographic spread.

== 9th century AD ==
Year	Image	Event
800 AD		Ifẹ transforms into a powerful forest city-state, accompanied by the commencement of an artistic era. The city begins experiencing an artistic production boom transforming Ifẹ into a major center of innovation.
800 AD		The Idena "gatekeeper" and Oreluere (Olofefura) figures carved out of solid granite at the entrance of the Ore grove (Igbo Ore) associated with Oke Ora in Ile-Ife are created. The figures are shown standing upright with interlocked fingers, a bare torso, a large wrapper girded by a tasseled sash around his lower body, beaded bracelets and globular beads strung into a circular neck adornment. The Idena statue offers some insight into the clothing customs, religion, and culture of people who lived in central Yorubaland around the year 800.
840 AD		Archaeological findings and excavations from round mounds in Oyokoro, the area which would later on become Old Oyo, the capital city of the Oyo Empire confirms the presence of human activity and settlement in northwestern Yorubaland by this period.
870 AD		The defensive earthworks (embankments) of Sungbo's Eredo in the area of the Ijẹbu country in south-central Yorubaland was built. With a length of 165 km and a height of between 5m and 20m in the deepest parts with vertical sided walls, building it involved moving an estimated 3.5 million m³ of earth. It has been suggested that the Eredo was constructed in phases, with the eastern section built first as a defensive fortification by an earlier Yoruba population called the Udoko, and the western section built later by Obanta of the Ijẹbu period. It is considered the single largest earthen structure ever built in Africa, and with LiDAR survey now considered the largest earthen enclosure in the world.
890 AD		Thermoluminescence dating of the Esiẹ soapstone statues places them in this period. The Esiẹ figurines, numbering more than 1,000 are the largest collection of carved stone statues in Africa. The figures bear strong resemblance with those from the Ifẹ's early formative period and may have been made by an early Ifẹ-linked group of with an organized society called the 'Ọba cultural complex'.

== 10th century AD ==
Year	Image	Event
900 AD~		The concept of divine kingship i.e The Ọba being a God-King, member of the Orisha, and an embodiment of a divinity became the standard in Ifẹ from where it would become the template of governance and social order throughout the entire region. The Yoruba religious practice of Ifá also became standardized in Ifẹ around this time although it had been developing gradually with its nexus of practise based in locations across central Yorubaland since Ifẹ's early formative period (500-800 AD). Ifẹ would continue to maintain this ritual primacy for many centuries afterwards.
900 AD~		Ifẹ begins the indigenous production of glass, a technology previously thought unknown in sub-Saharan Africa and develops a product trade monopoly. Circulation of Ife beads began sometime around 900CE and archaeological excavations at the site of Igbo Olokun yielded more than 13,000 glass beads and several kilograms of crucibles, production debris and vitrified residue dating from at least the 11th century. Chemical analysis of the Ifẹ or Yoruba glass revealed a unique chemical signature completely different from other known glass types from around the world. Colorants including manganese, iron, cobalt, and copper were intentionally added to produce a range of colors, including shades of dichroic blue-green (Ṣẹgi, Akori or "Coris"), colorless, multicolored, dark grey/black and red-yellow (Iyùn). These glass beads from Ile-Ifẹ Have been found at the archaeological sites of; Kissi, Diouboye, Gao, Essouk, Kumbi Saleh and in Kanem on the Lake Chad, showing Ifẹ's participation as a primary production centre in a greater West African trade network which had made it very wealthy.
900s c.AD		Oduduwa, a leader from the community of Oke Ora (Ọra's hill) to Ifẹ's east takes control of kingship in the Ifẹ valley, ushering in Ifẹ's 'late formative period' also known as the Oduduwa Era or second dynasty, which was marked by political, religious and economic consolidation. Ifẹ's main economic base shifted from agrarian to craft specialist.
900s c.AD	Ife Empire in 1000 CE	Ifẹ developed into a market town/trading hub of considerable importance with a broad network of tributary territories. Its simultaneous emergence as a southern terminal node of a Trans-Saharan trade network which was the early source of copper imports into West Africa, as well as its central location right in the middle of the bulge of the so-called ‘Nigerian lowland forests’ ecoregion east of the relatively drier Dahomey Gap, allowed it to occupy a central position in regional trade.

== 11th century AD ==
Year	Image	Event
1000 AD		Ifẹ becomes a centre for artistic innovation, producing artworks in various material forms, most of the earlier works were done in the terracotta medium.
1000 AD		Broken pottery sherds (Apaadi) and stone mosaic arranged in herring-bone pattern are used extensively in Ifẹ to pave the streets, temples, courtyards and important public spaces, marking the beginning of the pavement era. Tiles in the form of ceramic discs were also used to embellish walls and columns. By the 13th-14th centuries, these pavements had become a pan-Yoruba architectural style, especially in central Yorubaland with other finds coming from the Ekiti and Igbomina regions, but also as far away as Shabẹ and Igbo Idaasha in western Yorubaland.
1000 AD	Possibly earlier.	Bronze (brass) casting begins in Ifẹ. These early metalworkers use the Lost-wax casting (cire perdue) technique to create hyper-realistic heads, busts and other figures.
1019 AD		The Ọwọ royal dynasty is founded by Ojugbelu Asunlọla Arẹrẹ (Ọmalaghaaye), a son of Oduduwa (or Ọrunmila in certain traditions) who migrates out of Ifẹ to found the Ọ̀ghọ̀ kingdom. He settled first at Uji(n) with his followers from where they moved to a new location called Upafa near the current site of Ufẹ Oke (Idanre) where he died in 1070.
1030 AD		Ọbalufọn I (Ogbogbodirin) emerges king in Ifẹ, succeeding Oduduwa. His cognomen was Ọbamakin Ọsangangan, roughly translating to mean; The great King who illuminates like the sun at midday. He is remembered for having a peaceful and unusually long reign, however, Ifẹ was thrown into political chaos towards the end of his life.
1070 AD		The Ọwọ kingdom is founded. From Upafa, Ojugbelu's son Imadẹ led the group to Oke Imadẹ where they soon left due to issues of water scarcity. In their search for water, they followed a trail of migrating colobus monkeys (Ẹdun) which led them to Ugbo Ọgwata or Okiti Aṣẹgbo where he settled among an extant population of locals called the Ẹfẹnẹ with the twelve Igharẹ Iloro (high chiefs) who came from Ifẹ. Ọlọwọ Imadẹ is considered the first Ọlọwọ, since it was he who led the movement of the people to their current location. The name of the new kingdom was coined from Ojugbelu's hallowed manners which earned him the epithet 'Ọ̀ghọ̀' (Ọ̀wọ̀) meaning 'respect' or 'reverence'.
1085 AD	Approx.	Beginning of the Ketu royal dynasty. Ọba Ṣopaṣan (Shopashan) a.k.a. Ṣoropaṣan or Ṣoipaṣan leads a west bound kingdom founding migration out of Ife sometime between 931 and 1085 AD, crossing the Ọṣun, Ogun, Ofiki and Ọyan rivers. He settles with his retinue first at Oke-Ọyan in the vicinity of present-day Shaki, from where they moved to Aro-Ketu where he died. Five more kings rule from Aro before the group migrated and settled at Ile-Ketu, their final stop.

== 12th century AD ==
Year	Image	Event
1100 AD		Ifẹ becomes an empire. Its influence grows among its immediate neighbours and in the subregion. By the mid 14th century, it would become one of the biggest emporiums and wealthiest polities in West Africa.
1100 AD		Pottery was made at the site of Diogun in Oyokoro, (which would later on become the capital of the Oyo Empire) in this period. These earthenwares had various elaborate designs and impressions including; scallop impressions, brush incisions, frond, rock-comb, knotted, and twisted string roulettes.
1100 AD		The Kingdom of Ketu was founded. Ọba Ede the seventh Alaketu established the kingdom's capital at the current site of Ile Ketu from the old site of Aro Ketu sometime between 974 and 1101 AD.
1100 AD		Aladikun Olaosa an Obatala descendant leads an outward migration of people from Ife to the northwest, founding the ancient town of Adikun. According to legend, Ifa counselled the people to settle in a place of plentiful mushrooms (olu) and weaver birds (ega), i.e "Ibi ti Ega ati Olu fon si", the phrase lending its contraction to their new settlement — Ifon Ega. A final separation of Aladikun's descendants happened at Ifon ile (Ilamopo) after a succession dispute by two princes following the 9th Olufon's death, giving rise to the other Ifon towns, namely: Ifon Orolu, Ifon Omima on the Osse River, and Ifon Sepeteri.
1110 AD		The Ọrangun dynasty of Ila was founded by Ọrangun Fagbamila Ajagun-nla, a son or grandson of Oduduwa. He left Ife with his mother Adetinrin and headed northeast, taking with him a machete (Ada Ogbo) to clear the thicket path along the way— The act lending its name to the people group who became a part of his new kingdom; "Ogbo mọ Ọna" which over time became Igbomina. He then settled in a place called 'Igbo-Ajagunla' where he died, and his descendants reigned for several years (about 250) until 1365 when Amọtagẹsi (Amọta) moved the group to the new location of Ila Yara. There, they sojourned for many more years until the people fractured into two. One group, led by a prince Apakimo founded the town of Ila Okiri (later renamed Oke Ila).
1130 AD	Approx.	Ogun emerges as the king of Ifẹ.
1140 AD	Approx.	Ọbalufọn II (Alayemọrẹ) emerges king of Ifẹ, succeeding Ogbogbodirin (Ọbamakin) and Ogun. Towards the end of his reign, Ifẹ was ravaged by a severe episode of drought, and then, swept through by a bout of Smallpox epidemic. The King himself eventually caught the infection and had to be sequestered away to the Mọọrẹ quarter, more than 1 km from the city centre where he succumbed, although he lived well into an advanced age.
1150 AD		The Akure Kingdom is founded in the Ekiti region of east-central Yorubaland by Prince Ọmọrẹmilẹkun of the Oduduwa household, nicknamed "Aṣọdẹboyede" (He who hunted and arrived with royalty). At the village of Oṣu, he parted ways with the Ọranmiyan group and wandered east into the Ekiti hills, hunting through and camping at Igbo Ooye between Aramọkọ and Ẹfọn before finding his way into the Akurẹ area. The localized title of the first Ọbas was 'Àjàpadá', lit. ‘He who killed a multimammate rat (Eku ẹdá) with a rattle (Àjà)’. The newer title of “Déjì” (Ọwafadeji) came as a result of much later intrigues that links the kingdom with Ilesa, starting with Ọba Ogunja (1533-1554).
1150 AD		The Ijebu Kingdom was founded by three emigre brothers from Ife; Ọshin Mọọrẹ (Oṣin) a.k.a. 'Olu Iwa' who settled at Iwode, with Ajẹbu and Olode who surveyed the boundaries of the new land and from whose names the kingdom derived its appellation. Soon after, Obanta (Ogboroganlada), the son of the Ọọni (Olufẹ) by Gborowo, a daughter of Olu Iwa becomes the first Awujale around the 1200s after previous sojourns in Imẹsi and the Ondo area. From Ọbanta, 57 Kings have reigned over the Ijebu Kingdom.
1150 AD	Approx.	The Ọwa Obokun dynasty of Ilesha was founded. The dynasty began with Ajibogun Ajaka a.k.a. Obokun (bringer of seawater). Based on oral traditions, he left Ifẹ and headed northeast to start a kingdom with his inherited sword (Ida Ajashe) and a veilless crown. Subsequently, different Ọwas reigned at; Igbadaye (where Ajibogun died), Ilọwa, Ilemure (renamed Ibokun) and Ilaje (renamed Ipole), before Ilesa was eventually settled in the reign of Oge or Ọwaluṣe. On arrival, they met the Obaala already ruling the pre-dynastic community of Okesa. The Obaala later becme the traditional 'prime minister' of the emergent kingdom. 43 Owas have reigned, although it is alleged that the names of 9 Ọwas have been lost to history.
1167 AD	Wheat grain	Wheat (T. aestivum & durum) and cotton (Gossypium sp.) were consumed and used in Ife. Seed and coat fragments retrieved in archaeo-botanical contexts from the medieval urban center of Ifẹ showed that both crops, which likely spread through extensive Trans-Saharan trade networks (wheat could not be cultivated locally but cotton could) were both present and used in the city, representing both their largest hoard in West Africa and earliest documented occurrence at a latitude that far south in humid Africa (well outside their known cultivation range). Analysis of 353 charred cotton seeds and seed-coats revealed cultivation and processing of local cotton. Other foreign crops such as Chickpeas and Dates which likely represented luxury goods, as well as locally produced Pearl millet, Sorghum, Cowpea, Oil palm and Okra were also recovered.
1170 AD		Prince Ọranmiyan Odede, one of the youngest grandsons of Oduduwa arrives in Igodomigodo on the instructions of Ọọni Ọbalufọn, a son and second successor of Ọwọni Oduduwa whom the Edo knew as the Ọghẹnẹ n'Uhẹ. He arrives with a large contingent of co-travellers, among them; The Olu-Awurẹ of Ode Awurẹ (now Usen), Ojima of Okelusẹ, Irado/Erando (Olutese) of Ilẹ Agbama (now Utese), Orogbe a.k.a. Ihama, Ọlọtọn, Bamawo, Ogie Ẹfa (Ogiẹfa) who was already moving between Ifẹ and Igodomigodo before this coming, Ẹlẹma, Ẹdigin of Use, Olọ (Olero) and many others. He had his palace at Usama outside of the city-proper.
1173 AD		Ọranmiyan leaves Benin and returns after living for three years at Use with most of his Ifẹ comrades, known today as the Ihogbe led by the Ihama. He leaves behind his son, Ewẹka (Ọwọmika) whom he had from a union with a local princess, Erinmwinde, daughter of the 9th ruler (Ogie) of Egor village, who would become the first Ọba of a second Ifẹ dynasty in their care. Accordingly, every new Ọba must return to Use (where Ẹwẹka was raised by the "Ẹgbẹ Ivbi Uhẹ" and muttered his first words; ‘Ọwọ–mi–ka’ lit. ‘My hand struck it’), to pick their royal name as part of the re-enactment rites of coronation.
1176 AD	Approx.	Ọranmiyan settles at Oyokoro in a plain near the confluence of the Niger and Moshi rivers. The land likely belonged to the earlier polities of Owu, Ogboro and Adikun. He becomes its Ọba as the first Alaafin (lord of the palace), birthing two sons there; Dada Ajuwon a.k.a. Ajaka, and his half-brother Olufiran a.k.a. Shango/Arabanbi, born to him by princess Torosi, the daughter of a Tapa (Nupe) king remembered in tradition as Elempe. Oranyan did not stay at Oyokoro for too long, and he relocated soon after to Oko. Oyo at this period paid yearly tributes to the Owu kingdom.
1185 AD	Approx.	Ọbalufọn III (Ejigimogun) emerges king in Ifẹ, right in the middle of the sociopolitical turmoil that had plagued his predecessor, Ọbalufọn II.
1185 AD	Approx.	Oranmiyan returns to Ife after sojourns in Igodomigodo (now Benin) and Oyokoro in the Niger valley, and met Obalufon III already ruling the city. He ousts Obalufon III (Ejigimogun) and reigns as the sixth Ooni, ushering in a period of long lasting peace. Moremi Ajasoro was one of his wives in Ife. After Oranmiyan's reign and demise, he was buried in Ifẹ and Ọbalufọn III or his son of the same name was returned as king.
1190 AD	Approx.	The Mọremi episode in Ifẹ. After Ọbalufọn III's ousting by Ọranmiyan, he joins the Ugbo in their bout of guerrilla attacks on Ifẹ and its citizens which had been ongoing for years. The Ọranmiyan group was associated with Oduduwa while Ọbalufọn's supporters were associated with Obatala who had been in the city before Oduduwa's intrusion from his eastern abode of Oke Ora— they were the Ugbo a.k.a. Eluyare. During one of the attacks, Mọremi allowed herself be captured by the raffia-donning Ugbo. She marries Ọbalufọn their leader in exile and upon learning the truth, secretly fled back to Ifẹ where she reveals to Ọranmiyan and the Ifẹ populace the most effective way to tackle the Ugbo, flaming torches. She is venerated as an Ifẹ heroine. Oluorogbo and Ẹla, considered one and the same entity, was her only child. They are all celebrated in the annual Edi festival.

== 13th century AD ==
Year	Image	Event
1200 AD		The Olukumi communities on the right-bank of the lower Niger river were already existing by this period. However, tradition among the Olukumi themselves place their migration and settlement of the area in the pre-Ọranmiyan period of Benin as companions (Olùkù) of the first Benin kings.
1220 AD	Approx.	Dada Ajuwọn a.k.a. Ajaka, son of Ọranmiyan reigns as the Alaafin at Ọyọ.
1223 AD	Approx.	Shango a.k.a. Ọba Koso, the other son of Ọranmiyan reigns as the Alaafin at Ọyọ after deposing Ajuwọn (Ajaka), his elder brother. He routed the Owu and stopped the annual tributes Oyo paid. He then moved the capital from Oko back to Oyokoro and reigned for some years after which Ajaka was restored as Ọba. Ọyọ, nascent at this stage, started out as a provincial city within the Ife Empire’s socio-political orbit, and just like in Ile Ifẹ, potsherd pavements were also utilized in Ọyọ's public spaces during this period. Ajaka was succeeded by his son, Aganju.
1250 AD	Approx.	Ethnogenesis of the Egba people. From Ifẹ, three migratory waves move into the western forests (Igbo Ẹgba). The first and largest of these, settled northwest and became the Ẹgba Agura ('Gbagura) province under the paramountcy of the Agura, with its capital at Iddo. The second went beyond the first, settling south across the Ọna river and became the Ẹgba Oke Ọna under the Ọshilẹ (Oloko), with its capital at Oko. The third, most powerful and most southwesterly were the Agbẹyin, under the Ojoko of Kesi. Several decades later, a fourth wave was led by Ajalake, a member of the Oduduwa household and his party coming from Ketu, establishing the Ẹgba 'five sister' (Ọmọ iya) towns of; Ijẹun, Kemta, Iporo, Itoku, and Ake the capital. The group chose Ajalake to lead on account of his superior pedigree. He then took over the Agbẹyin (renamed Alake) province and Ake became the new capital. Originally, only the Alake, Oshilẹ, and Agura are said to wear Ade.
1270 AD	Approx.	Aganju waged war against the towns of Ogboro and Adikun to the west, seizing the Aladikun (Olu Adikun) crown, and bringing them and the immediate area into Oyo's political orbit as the Oyo kingdom starts taking shape from the fusion of previous mini-states.
1275 AD		The Yorubas crossed the Niger river into the area north of it from around Mokwa, and established a royal dynasty there. The Yoruba entity most likely responsible for ushering this dynastic instalment in Nupeland was the Ife Empire. This is corroborated by an account gotten from Nupe locals by Leo Frobenius, and later confirmed by Talbot. There seem to have been intense relationships between both groups, as several figures of Ifẹ origin or belonging to the Ifẹ artistic corpus have been found along the course of the middle Niger. The locals also mention that the brazen (brass) figures were brought there by Yoruba people in the 'olden times'.
1275 AD	Ketsa (Oke Osha), called "Juju Rock" by Europeans.	The Gbede lit. 'those who understand (the) language', (Gbedegi in Nupe) and Ebe (Asu), two Yoruba groups located astride the Niger establish several communities on both sides of the river, i.e; Ogudu (Ogodo), Gbajibo, Rabba, Kpaki, Tada, Mokwa, Shonga and Jebba (The last three retaining Yoruba presence till date). They remained solely Yoruba until the rule of Edegi, when they started being 'Nupenized'. Their Yoruba dialect survived into the 19th century, Clapperton recorded it, and Crowther heard it in 1857 being used by the priest of Ketsa (Oke Osha) in Religious contexts after a shipwreck in the Niger. Expert Nupe historiographer Nadel also recorded a single speaker on Jebba Island in a 1934 fieldwork. Yoruba retentions remained within the Nupe, including: The Elo and Mamma rites of the Gbedegi which uses masks with 'Yoruba' tribal marks of three vertical and one oblique line, or three opposite 'cat whisker' cuts converging on the lip, and 'Gugu' (Egungun) masks which mirror Gelede. Linguistic retentions include the Nupe words; Arọta (50), Lo/Lulọ (Go/to go), Adọni (70), Yawo (New bride), Wa/Wiwa (To seek), Ogọsan (180), Tsewo/Shewo (To trade), Gba (2,000), Ena (Fire), Gbọnwo (30), Tsọ/Shọ (To watch), Etc.
1285 AD~		The skill of brass casting was introduced into the Kingdom of Benin from the Ife Empire. According to the traditional account, this happened during the reign of Oba Oguola who reigned in the 13th or 14th century and wished to produce brass items similar to those usually sent to the kingdom from Ife locally. He sent to Ifẹ for an expert caster to come and help in establishing the guild at Benin, and a man remembered as Iguegha was sent, who became the first Inẹ (Ineh) of Igun. However, concrete evidence for brass working in Benin only dates to around 1400 and it wasn't until the 1500s under Esigie that Benin produced the bulk/majority of its brass works.
1300 AD	Possibly earlier.	The Ọbalufọn Copper mask was produced in honour of Ọbalufọn Alayemọrẹ the 5th or 6th Ọọni. Ọbalufọn II is renowned for his vigorous military campaigns and political diplomacy. During his reign, Ile-Ifẹ capital of the Ife Empire controlled an extensive network of towns and villages along the trade routes connecting central Yorubaland with the Niger River and areas further south, and he became synonymous with wealth, innovation, security, and stability. The mass production of glass beads and the importation of copper to Ile-Ifẹ to make alloys also surged during his reign. He is widely credited for commissioning brass images of the royal ancestors. He is identified today as the patron deity of metal casting, textiles, good governance and the founder of the Ogboni.
1300 AD		Pottery-ware made at the site of Mejiro in Ọyọ Ile (See Diogun in the 12th Century), which would become the capital of the Oyo Empire produced dates linking their production to this time period.

== 14th century AD ==
Year	Image	Event
1310 AD		The Kingdom of Ado is founded by Awamarọ ('the restless one'), an Ifẹ prince nicknamed Ewi for his eloquence among an earlier Yoruba-speaking group known as the Ulẹsun. He was the third successor of Biritikolu/Biritiokun who was part of the group that left Ifẹ with Oranmiyan. Due to subsequent circumstances in the forests between Ifẹ and Benin, Biritiokun separated from the group and headed north for Ọba-ile where he was hosted by the Ọlọba. The group then headed east to Udoani (Idoani) where they settled for years. Thence, they headed for a place now called Agbado where they settled again. After further years, the group moved again, Biritiokun had since died, but a faction stayed behind and the remaining headed into the land of the Ulẹsun led by Awamarọ. The name 'Ado' simply means 'settlement', 'station' or 'camp'.
1320 AD~		According to oral traditions, the Oranmiyan Obelisk (Opo Ọranmiyan) was built in Ifẹ some time after the death of Ọba Ọranmiyan to commemorate his memory. The 5.5m tall 1.2m circumference (at base) granite monument colloquially called the Ọranmiyan staff is studded with about 140 driven iron pegs made into an elongated trident shape, as well as a horn and an axe near the middle, all holding some symbolic meaning.
1340 AD		Ọba Rerengejen, the ninth Ọlọwọ builds the Aghọfẹn (palace grounds) of Ọwọ, occupying 180 acres in the centre of the kingdom when he moved from the old site of Okiti Aṣẹgbo. Some of the courtyards are paved with quartz pebbles and broken pottery. Caryatid-like pillars supporting roofs in the veranda are moulded as statues of men on horseback or shown with women. He also initiated the Igogo festival in commemoration of his queen, Olori Ọrọnshẹn.
1350 AD		Ile Ife, capital of the Ife Empire had an estimated population of 105,000 inhabitants. Other estimates put the population at 150,000 people.
1350 AD	Approx.	The Ife Empire reaches the peak of its artistic, cultural and spiritual influence in the region.
1363 AD		The Kingdom of Iwo was founded by Prince Adekọla Telu, son of the female Ọọni Luwoo Gbagida, the 21st Ọba of Ife and chief Ọbalọran. The migrating prince settled first with his people at a place called Ogundigbaro from where they moved to an area around Ẹrunmu. They then moved to Igbo-Orita near Ilesha where Adekọla Telu died and a dynasty of four kings was established before they eventually moved to the present site of Ile-Iwo near the confluence of the Ọba and Ọshun rivers led by Oluwo Parin Olumade the son of Jikanmu.
1385 AD~		The Kingdom of Igbo-Idaasha (Dassa Zoume) is founded by Ọladegbo who became Ọba under the title of Jagun Ọlọfin after migrating westwards from Ẹgba country and settling at the foot of the Arigbo hill. Upon arrival, the party, led by Sagbona met an extant pre-dynastic Yoruba-speaking population in the city-states of; Yaka, Epo and Ifita who already existed since at least the Ninth century CE. Ifita for example means; “Ifẹ Ita” i.e 'The Ifẹ abroad'.
1400	Approx.	The oldest/pioneer settlements of the Yewa/Egbado people led by Onidokun Leke of Ife were established. They were the villages of Erinja and Ilobi and the Iboro who trace their establishment to the western Ife migrations via Ketu.

== 15th century AD ==
Year	Image	Event
1420 AD		Art flourishes in the Ọwọ Kingdom. Archaeological works in sites like Igbolaja (Igbo Alaja) produced dates of terracotta art dating to this period. Ọwọ just like Ifẹ becomes one of Yorubaland's primary centres of art and innovation.
1425 AD	Course of the Ogun River. Idẹjọ Chiefs.	A kingdom founding migration led by Ogunfunminire an Ife prince settles in Ishẹri and its immediate environs. Before settling Ishẹri, the journey from Ife initially headed northwest towards Oke-Ogun and then trailed along the course of the Ogun River heading south until the ceramic plate they followed as a marker sank, an event lending its name to the people — Awori. Thence, they spread to Ebute Metta, then Iddo and eventually Lagos Island which they named Eko, a derivative of Oko, meaning a farm or plantation. He had 32 sons, half of whom he made 'white-cap' or Idẹjọ, the land owning chiefs, since he (Ogunfunminire) apportioned all the lands in Lagos between them. Some are: Aromirẹ, Oluwa, Ọjọra, Onikoyi, Oniru, Ọlọtọ, Olumẹgbọn, Onitana, Oniṣiwo, Elegushi and Onitọọlọ. He then returned to Ishẹri to continue ruling as Ọlọfin.
1442 AD		A system of earthen rampart walls and ditches (Iyara) about 3.4 km in circumference were constructed around the site of Ila Yara (Ila town of the rampart ditches), the original capital of the Ila kingdom of the Igbominas founded in 1365. The 'walls', 4.3-5.5m wide, were built with three access gates and enclosed a land area of 0.612 km². Dating of recovered pottery and other in-situ materials like; Cowries, Tuyere, Iron slag and animal remains (bone, shell) also confirmed the presence of an organized society actively engaging their environment at about the same period c..1442-1531.
1472 AD		The Portuguese reach the area of Lagos, the first place in Nigeria with documented European contact. The explorer Ruy de Sequeira sailed eastwards from the mouth of the Volta River hugging the coast as he did. He charted new routes and documented the coastal features of the area, noting the channel (Rio do Lago) between the inland lagoon (Ọ̀sà) and the sea (Okun), contributing to Lagos's early status as a hub for maritime trade. By 1485, Rio do Lago was already appearing on European maps.
1500 AD		The Ife Empire which had been declining in status since the 1400s eventually collapsed. After the decline of the empire and the associated shift in trading routes to the north and the coast, real power started to shift to a number of successor states, among them; the Oyo empire, Ijẹsha Kingdom, Kingdom of Benin, Ọwọ Kingdom, Ijebu Kingdom and the Kingdom of Ketu, all of which rose and arguably eclipsed their predecessor state. Ifẹ however continued to maintain a strong residual influence through ritual allegiance and religious reverence, maintaining its importance over these successor states as a 'spiritual capital' or 'father kingdom' and confirming their rulers' legitimacy.
1500 AD		The ancient town of Ede Ile is made vassal by Oyo, and becomes host to an Oyo military camp garrisoned by Timi Agbale (Ọlọfa ina) to check Ijesha expansion during Kori's reign, remembered as the seventh Alaafin (although details might be missing). It was meant to protect Oyo's trade routes and interests on the frontier nearly 100 miles (160 km) south against the Ijesha. After Timi's death, descent groups of his two sons Lamodi and Lalemo jostled for leadership. The monopoly by Lamodi's descendants forced the Lalemo group to migrate across the Osun River to the present Ẹdẹ.

== 16th century AD ==
Year	Image	Event
1506 AD		The Ọọni, king of Ife is apparently mentioned by name in Esmeraldo de Situ Orbis, where he is described as; 'Another great lord who lived quite close by "Licosaguou", by name the "Hooguanee" who played the same role among the negroes as the pope played in Europe'. The reverence with which the Ọọni (Ọwọni, Ọghọnẹ, Ọghẹnẹ) is described seems to be a confirmation of the tenacity of Ifẹ's legacy of primacy, even though the Ife Empire had collapsed.
1506 AD		Portuguese explorers describe the natives of the area around Lagos and the Ijẹbu Kingdom in more detail. Duarte Pacheco Pereira apparently makes mention of the Awujalẹ which he renders as "Agusale" as well as Sungbo's Eredo which is described as; "A great ditch surrounding the city of Geebu".
1506 AD		The Portuguese describe the Lagos area in further detail and mention their involvement in slave trade with Ijẹbu locals along the Atlantic coastline of Yorubaland for the first time.
1510 AD~		The Ondo kingdom was founded among the Udoko (Idoko) and Ifọrẹ people by the Oṣemawe dynasty. This dynasty began with princess Pupupu said to be one of twins born by queen Olu to either an Ọọni of Ifẹ or an Alaafin of Ọyọ after an eastward migration from Ita Ujama (Ijamọ), one of the three kingdom-founding dispersal points in the Ifẹ kingdom alongside Ita Marun and Ita Ijero/Ajero. The migration had two further way-stops at Epẹ and Ilẹ-Oluji before a final settlement at the foot of a hill called Oke Agunla in Ode Ondo. Pupupu was succeeded as Ọba by her son, Airo who introduced several reforms and one of the most historically significant Ondo deities, Ọranfẹ (Ọramfẹ).
1519 AD		Portuguese records make the earliest reference to locally produced Ijẹbu cloth (most likely Aso Olona or a version of it) as "Jabu" cloth being traded in the Gulf of Guinea islands (São Tomé). Clothing-ware produced by the Ijẹbu was much sought after along the Gulf of Guinea coast. The Portuguese resold them at the Gold coast (now southern Ghana), and various groups traded it among themselves after procuring them from Ijẹbu long distance traders, an activity that continued into the 19th century as evidenced by the story of Osifekunde, a young ijẹbu merchant kidnapped and sold into slavery during one such trip into the Niger Delta.
1520		Around the year 1530 (or 1520), the Nupe people during the reign of Edegi (Tsoede) occupy Oyo Ile, capital of the fledgling kingdom under Onigbogi, while its army led by the bashorun were away at war against the rebelious town of Ita Ibidun. This causes a dispersal of the city's inhabitants and the royal family which finds succour in Bariba country in a town remembered as Gbere, now identified by historians to be the small village of Gbereguru. Ọba Onigbogi dies there and is buried in Gwasero near Kaiama, some 15 kilometers further north. He was succeeded by Ofinran.
1520		Portuguese trade activity is reported in the area of the Mahin kingdom (Rio da Gaia), where they were reportedly buying Coris (a type of bead that was a product of Ifẹ's old glass making industry highly prized along the West African coast for its rarity) illicitly from the locals. These Ifẹ made beads were also being used for commercial transactions by the Portuguese based at fort Elmina on the Ghanaian coast.
1535 AD	Approx.	The first and original Ibadan was founded by Lagẹlu a.k.a. Apatamaja, an Ifẹ born grandson of Degẹlu, the Ọbalufẹ (Ọ̀rúntọ́) chief who became a powerful Ifẹ war captain and held the title of Jagun. He was also a grandson to Ọọni Luwoo Gbagida on his mother's side. Ibadan was built on a site called Igbo Ipara (Ipara forest) and was bordered by Egba Agura ('Gbagura), Ijẹbu and Owu villages. It was named Ẹba Ọdan by Lagelu, meaning; 'Edge of the grasslands' for its location in the forest-savanna transition zone. After an incident involving an Ọyọ Egungun which led to the sacking of the town, Lagẹlu and his people took refuge on Oke-Ibadan hill at Awotan-Akufo where they survived on Snails (Ìgbín), Cornmeal gruel (Ori) eaten with the snail shells (Ìkarahun) and African bush mangoes (Òro). They later re-settled at Oniyangi near Ọja Iba (Iba's market), until it was eventually abandoned around ~1630.
1547 AD		Enslaved Yoruba people are identified in the 'New World', when they are described on an estate in Hispaniola, specifically Santo Domingo (now the capital of the Dominican Republic) as 'Lucume'.
1550 AD~		The town of Igboho or Ọyọ-Igboho was founded for its defensible location by Alaafin Eguguojo (Egunoju) son of Ofinran (who had died in Kushu (Kuṣu) and reburied at Shaki and Igboho) after first leaving Kushu and later, Shaki. Four Alaafins reigned, died and were interred there; (Ofinran, Egunoju, Ọrọmpọtọ, Ajiboyede) in the royal grove called 'Igbo Ọba' before the reoccupation of Ọyọ-Ile by Egunoju's son Abipa who also ruled partially from there. He was succeeded by his sister Orompoto.
1550 AD~		The first sizeable Muslim community develops in Yorubaland during the period in Igboho. Islam itself in Yorubaland came from the northwesterly direction via the Bariba-Borgu corridor with Ọyọ through the commercial relations with Songhai speaking Wangara traders of Malian roots, a people whose local appellation Imale also became associated with the new religion they practiced. The name of the earliest Islamic scholar in Yorubaland is remembered to be one 'Baba Yigi' or 'Alfa Yigi'.
1554 AD~		Orompoto became king of Ọyọ. While some historians have described her as a regent, others have described them as male and brother to Egunoju. But most testimonies point to her being female and an actual Queen regnant who took over because Ajiboyede, Egunoju's son was too young. Under her reign, Ọyọ's infantry and especially its cavalry forces became re-organized and powerful. They drove out the Nupes from Ọyọ territory, chasing them back across the Niger River. She also defeated the Borgus at the battle of Ilayi, after which Borgu became an Oyo vassal state. However, she continued to maintain the capital in Igboho where she eventually died.
1558 AD	Carte du golfe de Bénin et partie de la côte de Guinée depuis la rivière de Volta jusqu'u c. Formosa - (Bellin) ; Croisey sc. - btv1b85955855	The Ijẹbu kingdom appears on Portuguese maps for the first time as "Yabu" and later as "Jabou" and other variants in subsequent editions.
1571 AD		A West African map by Fernão Vaz Dourado labels the Niger river or a river east of the "R. Formoso" as "R. de Iacomi" (Lucumi River), a Yoruba ethnonym. Some have argued that this reference referred specifically to the Olukumi communities on the right bank of the lower Niger river, or at the very least, a suggestion of the presence of Lucumi people on the coastal area to Benin's east.
1580 AD~	Approx.	Abipa Ogbolu a.k.a. Ọbamọrọ (lit. The king caught ghosts) became Alaafin. He was born 20 years after the fall of Ọyọ-Ile, when the royal party was on the road approaching Igboho the temporary capital. He was the first Alaafin to rebuild Ọyọ-Ile back as capital after approximately seventy years around the year ~1590.
1590 AD~		Abipa Ogbolu Ọba m'ọrọ returns to the site of Ọyọ-Ile the old capital, after around 70 years outside it. For some years before the return of the Alaafins to the site of the old capital, the control of southern Borgu and parts of Nupe below the Niger river was already firmly in the hands of Ọyọ as overlords. Thence, Ọyọ began a period of rapid expansion and entered the Age of Empire.
1590 AD~	Approx.	Benin occupation and activity on Lagos Island, an agricultural and fishing hamlet peopled and ruled from the neighbouring Island of Ido. Traditional accounts between that of Lagos and those from Benin differ about the origin of this occupational presence and subsequently, the Lagos royal dynasty starting in the 1600s. Lagos accounts relays that it came by as a result of a settlement between a local ambitious Awori royal, Ashipa of Ishẹri and the Benin royal family who after being allowed to settle the Island to trade, failed in its conquest attempts. Benin accounts claim the Island was conquered and Ashipa was a grandson of Ọba Ọrhọgbua. Ashipa took the body of one Asheru, a Benin general who died in one of the failed conquest attempts back to Benin and secured favour there. Whatever the case, the Benin Kingdom had an active encampment on the island dating to this period.
1595 AD~		Ọbalokun (The King at sea) becomes the Alaafin over a rising Ọyọ empire around this time (or alternatively around 1614). He was the first Alaafin to gain access to the Atlantic and therefore the Triangular trade. One of his nicknames was "Aágànná Erin" — 'The plundering elephant', alluding to his expansionism. According to Ọyọ tales, he was in contact with a European King, likely Portugal but possibly France. He is also credited with the introduction of sea salt into Ọyọ, and starting in his reign, the Oyo Empire gradually ousted the Benin kingdom from their commercial interests in coastal Yorubaland.

== 17th century AD ==
Year	Image	Event
1615 AD		The Yoruba people are mentioned by name [Y-R-B] by Ahmed Baba in an essay titled – Mi'rāj al-Ṣu'ūd alongside nine other ethnic groups in the region. The document provided one of the earliest known ideas about the ethnic composition of the West African interior, since most external references before it tends to focus on groups on the littoral coastal belt of Africa.
1620 AD		Alaafin Ajagbo creates the position of Aare Ọna Kakanfo in the Ọyọ Empire as leader of the Ẹshọ Ikoyi, an elite corp military guild, who personally commandeered the imperial army in the field on all campaigns. The Ẹshọ were led by 70 war officials nominated by the Oyo Mesi, headed by the Bashọrun. These were subdivided into 16 senior and 54 Junior chiefs. The first Aarẹ was Kokoro Gangan of Iwoye, a Ketu town.
1620 AD		The Abomey plateau is taken over by an immigrant Aja princely group from Allada, led by Dogbari a.k.a. Do-Aklin. The petty kingdoms of the Gedevi, a Yoruba people indigenous to the plateau are absorbed into the new Aja state of Dahomey, and their identity is subsumed into that of the new Fon ethnicity.
1640 AD	Dec 26	Father Columbin de Nantes reports that "Licomin" (Yoruba) was the Lingua franca in Benin and the Bight of Benin region, describing it as 'universal' and comparing it to the status and role of Latin in Europe. He also mentions the West African kingdoms of; Benin, Ijẹbu, Licomin and Warri as parts of 'Guinea' where the Portuguese do not live.
1644 AD		The Ikalẹ trading town of Arogbo-ile (known as Arebo/Arbo to the Portuguese) becomes the biggest commercial center in the eastern Bight of Benin attracting the Dutch who had already displaced the Portuguese as the biggest European trading group in the Gulf of Guinea since at least the 1620s to build a trading station there. This caused the trading station “Fattoria” of the Portuguese in Ughoton to gradually decline and eventually run out of business to Portuguese chagrin, since Arogbo ile was much better placed than Ughoton, marking the strategic shift in the center of European trade in the region from Ughoton to Arogbo-ile.
1650 AD	Approx.	The town of Ilọrin was founded. Before it became significant, its location was settled first by Ojo Ayinla a.k.a. Ojo Iṣekuṣe, a hunter from Ganbẹ-ilọta near Ọyọ-Ile. He was joined by Laderin from Ọtẹfọn, a village to Ilọrin’s north, and Emila from Ila Orangun. The town then became a popular spot for people making and sharpening metal tools on a rock called ‘Okuta ilọ-irin’ which became the name of the town, a spot said to still be at Bamidele's compound in the Idi Apẹ area of town. Laderin became the first Baalẹ, after which he was succeeded by his son Pasin or Fasin, and then by Alugbin/Alagbin, Afọnja's father.
1668 AD~		A large and mighty inland kingdom (identified as Oyo) to the northeast of Allada is described by Dutchman Olfert Dapper in his work Description of Africa. He also confirmed the status of Yoruba as lingua-franca in Allada when he wrote; — Their own mother tongue is by them little regarded; therefore they seldom speak it; but they are obliged to speak mostly "Alkomijs" which in their country is regarded as a noble language.
1670 AD~		The town of Osogbo was founded by the Ijesha. Oba Gbadewọlu Larọọye, son of Owa Laage, the sixth Oba of Ipole-Omu settled the town due to famine at Ipole. Olutimehin (a hunter) had discovered a perennial river (Oshun) and motivated Larọọye to migrate with the town's folk. The town became an Ijesha military bulwark resisting the thrust of Oyo being launched from the military station at Ede. Other historians such as Peel (1983), however place the foundation of the town in the 1500s at the same time as the Oyo garrison at Ede, during the period of Ijesha expansion.
1670 AD~		The Aafin (palace) of the Ọbas of Lagos: Iga Idunganran was built. Its name means; 'The pepper palace' in the local Awori dialect. It was so named because it was built on the site of the Pepper farm (Oko Iganran) of Aromirẹ, the most senior Idẹjọ chief and owner of the lands on Lagos Island.
1688 AD	Olukumi, 1734	Frenchman, Du Casse, noted that the Europeans in the kingdoms of Allada and Whydah bought woven cloth coming from the "Kingdom of Concomi" for resale at the Gold coast (Present-day Ghana). Subsequent accounts of this extensive cloth trade identify the source as Lucamee or Locomin, variants of Olukumi a Yoruba ethnonym. The kingdom producing these clothes was most likely Ijẹbu, Ọyọ or both.
1698 AD		Ọyọ conquers the coastal Aja kingdom of Allada.
1700 AD~	Approx.	An anonymous French account in Ouidah reports that the diviners in the Kingdom of Whydah locally called Boucots (Bokónó)— Priests of Fa, were nearly all strangers who came from a country called "Laucommis", testament to Yoruba influences on the early development of Vodun and the spirituality of the people groups to its west.
1700 AD~		The Portuguese and Benin attack and destroy the Ikalẹ commercial town of Arogbo ile out of spite and massacre its populace. The King, Olu-Arogbo ('Larogbo) migrated west with some survivors to 'Ode Atijọ' (the olden city) which became the Ikalẹ capital with different quarters hosting its different groups, and later upriver on the Ọwẹna (Siluko) to found Akotogbo. Others migrated back south to Ode Ugbo their ancestral capital. The events of this period and the involvement of the ‘Oyinbo Potoki’ are still remembered today in Ikale songs, proverbs and folklore, some of which were collected by British administrators between 1920-1930 and fieldwork by Prof Olukoya Ogen from 1998-2004.
1700 AD~	Approx.	The Anago kingdom of Ifọnyin (in the Plateau Department of Benin) was founded by Ọyọ on Ketu territory to protect its link with the coast, followed by its two daughter kingdoms of Ihunbo and Ikolaje, which with the permission of the Alaafin got crowns from the Ẹlẹhin Odo of Ifọnyin, then came the later offshoot of Ilashẹ.

== 18th century AD ==
Year	Image	Event
1724 AD		The Oyo empire under Alaafin Ojigi begins the conquest of Dahomey after receiving requests for assistance from other kingdoms who were threatened by Agaja, such as Allada (Ardra). By 1727, Dahomey had become an Ọyọ vassal state.
1725 AD	Nago, 1800's	First appearance/textual mention of the term Nago in reference to the Yoruba people appears at the port town of Ouidah in Chevalier des Marchais's account of Africa. The term is a derivative of the self appellation of a western Yorubaland group called the Anago which became popular in the Atlantic diaspora, especially in the French, British and Brazilian colonies as a 'catch-all' word describing everything Yoruba related including the people, their language, their religious beliefs, and their culture.
1729 AD		The princes of Oueme who had fled to Ọyọ for protection, and the king of Ouidah (Igelefe) applied to Ọyọ for help against Dahomey. By 1730, Dahomey was paying a regular tribute checked every November at Kana (Cana, Calmina) by Ọyọ officials, and carried by a Dahomean chief to Ọyọ, the value of which amounted annually to about £32,000 in 1965 or £796,822 in 2025. It was allowed to keep its military, however, they were considered to be agents that must be used mainly in imperial interests and consult with Ọyọ to obtain permission before any military operations were taken.
1730 AD		The Ọyọ Empire abolishes Primogeniture or direct father to first son (Arẹmọ)/crown prince transfer as the rule of succession to one based on a pool of princes from the royal house. Following this change, the Oyo Mesi (7 'Kingmakers') led by the Bashọrun became very powerful in the kingdom's political affairs. With the newly found power of making and deposing Ọbas, they began selecting princes which they deemed generally weak to assume kingship. While the official reason behind the change was to discourage patricide, it weakened the monarchy and strengthened the Mesi and the non royal chiefs.
1736 AD		The town of Badagry is founded by Gùn refugees and Dutch trader Hendrik Hertog (Huntokonu). After fleeing a war of Dahomean expansion along the coast in Godomey (Jakin), they settled on lands used as a farming hamlet granted to them by the Awori kingdom of Apa and the Anago kingdom of Ipokia. Shortly after, it became an important Ọyọ port which made its population swell and attract other Popo refugees and Aworis from the surrounding area as well as Spanish, Portuguese, French, Dutch and English slave traders.
1747 AD		Ọyọ penetrates the Popo country of the Hwla people during the reign of Alaafin Oniṣile (Onishile).
1764 AD	Oyo Empire c.. 1790	The Oyo Empire (Including the kingdom of Dahomey) and the dissident state of Akyem defeated the Asante Empire and its neighbouring Akan Allies at the Battle of Atakpamé in modern day Togo. Around 10,000 to 12,000 members of the Ashanti army (20,000 by some estimates) were either killed or made slaves of, and the reigning Asantehene was destooled and replaced.
1774 AD		Bashọrun Gaha (Gaa) was overthrown in Ọyọ after causing the abdication and ritual suicide of four Alaafins in quick succession beginning at about 1754, until the reign of Abiọdun a.k.a. Adegolu who himself had to keep a bodyguard force of 4,000 Popos under his son's command. After a long confrontation, Kakanfo Ọyabi and his men eventually broke through Gaha's defences and put his compound to fire. He was then taken captive and subsequently killed in a ceremonial burning or dismemberment (according to other accounts). However, Gaha's legacy of tyrannical disrespect for the most revered office in the land had dealt a serious blow on the prestige of the Alaafin across the empire. For this victory, the Alaafin received presents from all the rulers in the empire, including Kpengla of Dahomey.
1783 AD		The multi-ethnic Borgu state break free from Oyo empire vassalage and achieved practical autonomy during the reign of Alaafin Abiọdun (Adegolu). However, they continued to pay tributes to the Empire until the year 1818.
1784 AD		A joint army from western Yorubaland, Mahi, Lagos and Dahomey commandeered by the Ọyọ imperial forces attack and destroy the coastal town of Badagry. Two years later in May 1786 the same fate befell Oueme, however the Alaafin commanded the troupes to stop as they attempted to attack Porto Novo, a protected Ọyọ vassal Allada which Ọyọ considered its "personal calabash, out of which no one was permitted to eat".
1785 AD		Lagos sends a fleet of war canoes east through the inland coastal lagoon system to the Benin River (Rio Formosa), reportedly intending to attack the French factory there. The fleet was repulsed with heavy losses by Itsekiri forces of the Warri Kingdom, which had received ammunition from the French factor.
1785 AD	Approx.	The Yewa (Egbado) towns of Ilaro and Ijanna were founded by Ọyọs in the reign of Alaafin Abiọdun when Ọyọ's coastal trade route moved east. The Olu of Ilaro governed with Ọyọ sanction, while the Onishare (lit. envoy) of Ijanna was an Ọyọ ilari official directly appointed to oversee the town. Ilaro became the principal Ẹgbado town, while Ijanna followed.
1791 AD		The Nupes break free from Oyo empire vassalage, achieving practical autonomy during the reign of Alaafin Awọlẹ.
1793 AD		Alaafin Awọlẹ Arogangan orders the imperial forces to attack the market town of Apomu in the Kingdom of Ifẹ soon after becoming king, a great cultural taboo (As the Yoruba mother city, all Alaafins had to swear oaths never to attack Ifẹ before taking office). This, he did because he had been punished earlier by the Baalẹ of Apomu for the ‘Apomu incident’. The Baalẹ fled to refuge at the palace of the Ọọni Ifẹ his overlord but later commits suicide.
1796 AD		Alaafin Awọlẹ orders a sacking of the naturally defended town of Iwere-ile, the maternal town of Alaafin Abiọdun who was very popular and much loved in his reign. The attack was to be led by the Aarẹ-Ọna-Kakanfo Afọnja, the Onikoyi and the Baalẹ of Igbogun. The command (royal plot) was kept secret. On getting to Iwere ile and after the royal order was divulged, the army went into a full mutiny led by its commanders. They return to Ọyọ Ile and Awọlẹ commits ritual suicide. His reign lasted seven years.
1796 AD		The Ẹgbas, led by Lishabi, revolted massively against Ọyọ overlordship. Born at Itoku but living in Igbẹin, both in the Alake's province, he was joined by Amosu of Ikija in Oke-Ọna, Arinakoju of Ọjọọ and Akila of Ido in Agura. To avoid suspicion, they grouped fighters into various Ẹgbẹ Aro (agricultural co-operatives) which then transformed into an underground militia, Ẹgbẹ Olorogun. He made it known to the Olorogun war commanders of his plan to massacre the tyrannizing Ajẹlẹs (imperial land agents and tax collectors) from Ọyọ and received no opposition. When the time was ripe, he signalled the commencement of revolution by killing the Ajẹlẹs in his own town of Igbẹin. Within days, more than 600 other Ajẹlẹs were killed all over Ẹgbaland by the Oloroguns. The empire responded by sending an army of Ọyọs, Ẹgbados, and Ibarapas, but they were routed by an elaborate ploy, gaining the Ẹgbas their independence in a single master stroke.

== 19th century AD ==
Year	Image	Event
1807	Mar 25	The British parliament pass the Slave Trade Act 1807, stopping the formal transportation of enslaved Africans, including Yoruba people, to the Americas. According to David Eltis, almost a million (968,200) Yoruba people were trafficked across the Atlantic to the Americas during the course of the Trans-Atlantic Slave Trade between 1650 and 1865, peaking at 211,400 and 257,400 people in the first and second quarters of the 1800's respectively.
1819		The boundaries of Yorubaland were described by Joseph Dupuis, the British consul and envoy to the Ashanti kingdom. He arrived in 1819 and published his work in 1824 describing the kingdoms of Western Africa. Yoruba is described as the 'Greatest in extent among these sections (south of the desert)'. Its territorial extent was defined by its border with Killinga (Djougou) in the north, 'Ghunja' and Dagomba in the west, Benin and 'Waree' on the south and unknown districts of the Sudan called 'Dakhlata' on the east. This description largely corresponds with the known extent of Yorubaland today.
1820		Osifekunde an enslaved Ijẹbu taken to Brazil, years later finds himself in Paris. There, he meets ethnographer; Marie-Armand d'Avezac whom he grants an interview in pidgin Portuguese. In the interview which became an important addition to European knowledge of the Guinea Coast, he explains that the town of Apomu was ruled by the [sic] 'Obba Ouve' lit. King of Ufẹ/(Ifẹ) who was brother to the Awujalẹ of Ijẹbu Ode. In plainer terms, Apọmu belonged to the brother (Ọọni) of the king of Ijẹbu (Awujalẹ), confirming their ancient dynastic linkages.
1821	Ifẹ Kingdom incl. Apomu and Owu	The Owu–Ifẹ war breaks out between the town and Kingdom of Owu under Ọba Amọroro, then the largest settlement in southern Yorubaland and traditional Ọyọ allies and a joint Ifẹ-Ijẹbu coalition for destroying the Ifẹ market town of Apomu earlier. Some Ọyọs (now homeless) also joined the coalition against Owu because Awọlẹ's 1793 attack on Apomu and his desecration of the old Yoruba constitution had resulted in the conditions that rendered them displaced. In 1825, after a prolonged siege, Orile Owu was destroyed on the command of the Ọọni. The Owus in turn, continually fled around, first to Ẹrunmu then Ogbere until all the large Owu towns were destroyed. They eventually join the Ẹgba at Abẹokuta where they settled in 1834/35.
1823		The kingdom of Dahomey under Ahọsu (king) Ghezo breaks free from the Ọyọ Empire under Alaafin Majotu, ending its ≈ 95 years long tributary state status.
1824		Afonja the Aarẹ Ọna Kakanfo and Baalẹ of Ilọrin was killed in an insurrectionist coup at Ilọrin and Abdulsalami, son of Salih Janta a.k.a. Alimi, an ethnic Fulani from Bunza takes over leadership as head of the Jama'a, a mixed congregation of Ọyọ Muslims and non Ọyọs like runaway Hausa slaves, Fulanis and others in 1823/24.
1825	Dec 7	Captain Clapperton accompanied by his servant Richard Lander visit and travel through Yorubaland starting out from the coastal city of Badagry and reaching Ọyọ Ile and Kushu during its 'last days' in June 1826 which he described as; A large double walled town which was by much the largest town we have seen. His account of this journey was published in 1829 by Lander after Clapperton died in Sokoto in April 1827.
1829		The contemporary City of Ibadan was founded. This Ibadan became home to an eclectic mix of various Yoruba groups, including; Ifẹs and Ọyọs (at Ọja Iba), Ijẹbus (at Isalẹ Ijẹbu), Aworis (at Itun Ishẹri), Owus and Ẹgbas (at Yeosa). The Owus joined in their numbers after the Owu/Ifẹ-Ijẹbu war, the Aworis joined due to a royal fiasco involving a prince of the Ọlọtọ family of Ido who then migrated to Ibadan with his supporters, while the Ọyọs became numerous due to the wars ravaging their hometowns in northern Yorubaland. The Ẹgbas however migrated out the following year due to Inter-group tensions. Mayẹ Okunade, an Ifẹ general was the first Baalẹ and was assisted by Labọsinde who was also Ifẹ as Baba-Isalẹ. Lakanle was the leader of the Ọyọ group. The Ifẹs lost their political primacy in Ibadan after the Gbanamu war of 1833, during which several Owu settlements were again destroyed as they fled to Abẹokuta to join the Ẹgba. Ifẹ towns like Ipetumodu and Apomu were also occupied and the Ọyọs became the dominant faction in Ibadan. Oluyẹdun, the son on Afonja became the first Ọyọ Baalẹ followed by Oluyole, maternal grandson of Alaafin Abiọdun who was then named Bashọrun by Alaafin Atiba in 1839.
1830		The city state of Abeokuta is founded by the Ẹgbas on the banks of the lower Ogun River on the site of what was then a small farming stead first settled by Liperu an Ogboni chief, joined subsequently by three hunters; Jibulu, Ọshọ and Olu-nle. The out-migration was led by Balogun Shodẹkẹ of Iporo. The new city developed into a confederacy with place name duplications of former towns/origins of the founder groups which populated them, i.e Igbore, Itoku, Ake, Owu, and Ikija. The population continued to grow rapidly, and by 1842, it had swelled to an estimated 45,000 people.
1830	May	The Lander brothers (Richard and John) landed in Badagry to explore the course of the Niger River, commissioned by the British government. They took Clapperton's route to Bussa and arrived in Oyo in May, 1830. In Ọyọ, they also record traditions linking the Alaafin and the Omo n'Oba of Benin as brothers from the same progenitor. Based on their report, the northern boundary of Yorubaland was the Moshi river which flowed into the Niger river on the side opposite Rabba.
1830	May 15	The Lander bros. become the first Europeans to acquire Ife artefacts directly from locals at an Old Oyo market. They were pieces of dichroic glass which the locals told him were Dug up in a country called 'Iffie' which is stated to be four moons journey from Katunga where, according to their tradition, their first parents were created, and from whence all Africa has been peopled. A confirmation of the ritual significance of Ife in the social consciousness of the 'Yoruba world'.
1830		The rulers of Lagos Island assert their independence and stop the paying of tribute to their patron state, the Benin kingdom. However they seemed to have maintained a ritual fealty as Akitoye would confirm years later while in exile that the traditional rights to confirm the people's choice as king still rested with the Benin royal court.
1830		The Oworo people, aboriginal natives of the Lokoja area were successfully persuaded by European pioneers into a gradual descent from their various villages on Mount Patti and the Agbaja Plateau into the lowlands that was eventually made by William Baikie into a new town first christened 'Lairdstown', and later, 'Lukoja' at the confluence in 1859, a Yoruba (Oworo) word derived from the phrase; "Ilu Oke Ọja" (The hill market town). The last Oworo chief on Mt. Patti was Menaha whom Baike personally met in 1854. Today, the Oba of Agbaja is the Olu Oworo, the most paramount Oworo traditional ruler.
1830	Approx.	The Polẹ war begins between Ilọrin and Ekiti–Ijẹsha. Having secured significant successes in the northwest (Ọyọ country), Ilọrin swings the force of its war machinery southeast towards the Ijesha–Ekiti region. However, the result of their foray was a disastrous loss. Unlike Oyo which was plagued by severe infighting, and was characterized by 'near-sudanic' conditions with open savanna grassland, eastern Yorubaland was High forest with close vegetative canopy, was wetter, and was hillier. Ilọrin, operating a cavalry heavy military formation stood little chance. The locals put the terrain to good use. Several horses died, while the riders and foot infantry became prime targets of strategic attacks and were hacked down. The invaders were defeated. Beating a retreat from the region, they were able to hold some extreme northern Ekiti villages in the plains, i.e Obbo and Eruku. This was Ilọrin's first serious military check.
1831		Kurunmi, the Balogun of Esiele and Dado of Oyo-ile lead a group of Oyo freebooters/refugees to occupy the Ẹgba town of Ijaiye and displaced its inhabitants who fled to Abeokuta. They make the town their new base.
1835		The Battle of Eleduwe was fought between a joint Oyo–Borgu allied force on one side and the forces of Ilorin on the other. The war ended in a defeat of the Oyo–Borgu alliance and the death of Alaafin Oluewu, as well as two Borgu kings; Séro Kpéra II or Ilọrinkpunọn (lit. 'died in Ilọrin' in Bariba), the king of Nikki, and the unnamed king of Wawa.
1835		Final collapse of the Ọyọ empire. When news of the war's outcome reached Ọyọ Ile the capital, the population understood the repercussions. Nearly all of them packed up and fled the city, leaving it abandoned. Many left for such towns as Kishi, Igboho and Ilọrin, but especially southwards into the interior. Learning of its abandonment, Lanloke the renegade chief of Ogodo (Ogudu), a Yoruba (or Yoruba and Nupe mixed) trading town on the Niger River east of Ọyọ Ile entered the undefended city and eventually managed to pillage the city after the third attempt.
1836		Atiba, son of Abiọdun becomes Alaafin at Agọ Oja (Oja's camp) which became the site of 'New Ọyọ'. The town thence became known by the new name of 'Ago d'Ọyọ' (Ago becomes Ọyọ) and later as Ọyọ Atiba (Atiba's Ọyọ). Atiba had always nursed the desire of becoming Alaafin and while administering the town as a prince, he allied with the powerful war chief duo of; Oluyọle in Ibadan and Kurunmi in Ijaye, promising to install them as Bashọrun and Aarẹ ọna Kakanfo respectively in exchange for their support.
1838		The emerging state of Ibadan (successor state to the Ọyọ Empire) defeated Ilọrin at the decisive Battle of Oṣogbo, putting a halt to the expansion of the Jihad further southwards in Yorubaland and effectively marking the end of the Sokoto Fula Jihad in that part of West Africa. In the war, four Ilọrin generals were captured or executed. The war marked the rise of Ibadan Republic as the central power in the Yoruba region.
1839		(Or in 1844) The Ẹgbas attacked and blockaded the Awori town of Ado after sieging Ọta in order to monopolize the roads to and from Lagos and Badagry and control (or at least influence) maritime trade to give it greater influence in the interior. Ọta had previously fallen to the Ẹgba forces around 1835.
1842	Birch Freeman Sept 24	Christian missionaries start arriving in Yorubaland, led by people like Thomas Birch Freeman of the Methodist Missionary Society in Badagry and Abẹokuta, followed in Dec 19, 1842 by Henry Townsend of the CMS in Abẹokuta, Ajayi Crowther in 1846, J.T Bowen in 1850 and Anna Hinderer in Ijaye, Ibadan and Ibarapa in 1853. The first converts were; Sarah Ibikotan and her son Adeṣina, Afutike, wife of Chief Okukenu, the first Alake to rule from Abẹokuta, and Hannah Afala, Samuel Ajayi's own mother. Before then, the Christians in Yorubaland had largely been Catholic South American returnees known locally as Aguda or Amaro who started arriving shortly before. In 1853, there were around 130 Brazilian families, and a smaller group of Cuban families or 'Emancipados' in Lagos.
1843		Samuel Ajayi Crowther authored and published the first comprehensive Yoruba language dictionary, as well as a book on Yoruba grammar, a translation of the Anglican common prayer and a vocabulary of the Yoruba language which he revised some years after in 1852. However, before him, some preliminary work on Yoruba grammar had been undertaken and published by authors such as Rev. John Raban, also of the CMS as early as early as 1832, representing the earliest significant 'western' study of the language.
1845	March	The Egba and Dahomey engage in their first open clash in Imojolu, near the Awori town of Ado-Odo, resulting in an Ẹgba victory, sowing the seeds for further hostile clashes between the two ascending ambitious states. The throne (stool), royal umbrella, war totems/charms and other royal paraphernalia of Dahomey were captured by the triumphant Ẹgba forces, and Ghezo himself only narrowly escaped capture.
1848		Sarah Forbes Bonetta (Aina) is captured during a Dahomean raid on her native town of Oke-Ọdan in the Yewa/Ẹgbado region. Her parents are killed in the attack along with other residents, and she is taken captive with other survivors. Many of the captives are illegally sold into the Atlantic slave trade. Aina is spared this fate, and is instead brought as a child slave to the court of Ghezo. She would then be saved the later fate of being sacrificed in an annual mass ritual event by Captain Frederick Forbes who redeems her in the name of Queen Victoria and embarks on his journey back to Britain, where the Queen would adopt her as goddaughter.
1850		Ibadan under Bashọrun Oluyọle expands eastwards across Yorubaland, occupying nearly the whole of the Ijẹsha, Ekiti, Akoko and the Ọssẹ river valley. They took Ikẹrẹ and Ado in 1845, Akurẹ in 1854 and Ilesha in 1859. This they did, initially to checkmate Ilọrin's expansion and oust them from the territory they held in northern Ekiti and Ijesha and also to support the most easterly Ọyọ towns of Ẹdẹ and Ikirun, but the Ibadan forces soon got engrossed in the prospects of acquiring personal riches via slaving and war booty, spoils and pillage, and became despotic and abusive.
1851	March 3	Dahomey's first invasion of Abeokuta (1st Egba – Dahomey war) results in a defeat. The Dahomey army consisted of 15,000 male troops and 2,500 amazons according to R.F Burton who was in Agbọme (Abomey). On their way to Abẹokuta, the town of Ishaga had fed them wrong information, making them cross the Ogun river at a deep part, and attack the city at the southwestern or Aro gate, which was its most fortified section. More than 3,000 Dahomeans were killed, and another 1,000 taken prisoners. The vengeful Dahomeans would later embark on an expedition that destroyed Ishaga on March 5, 1862.
1851		The population of Lagos township is estimated at between 25,000 and 30,000 inhabitants and was at this time the largest town on the entire coastline of West Africa.
1851	Dec 26	The British Royal Navy bombards Lagos. The Bombardment of Lagos (Ogun Agidingbi/Ahoyaya) happened under the justification of suppressing the Atlantic slave trade and deposing (Ọba) Kosoko of Lagos for refusing to end the slave trade. Kosọkọ was deposed and replaced with Akitoye, who had previously lost the throne to Kosọkọ at the battle of Omiro (Ija Omiro) on June 9, 1845 and asked the British to help him return to power in return for ending the trade.
1852	Lagos Nigeria Jan 1	Oba Akitoye and John Beecroft signed the Treaty Between Great Britain and Lagos which required the native ruling elite of Lagos to abolish the Atlantic slave trade, liberate enslaved Africans, expel European slave traders residing in Lagos, and to allow British subjects trade access to Lagos. The British would annex Lagos a decade later.
1858		King Ghezo of Dahomey is mortally wounded by gunfire from a Ketu sniper during a military campaign in the Ẹgba country. He tried reaching Agbọmẹ (Abomey) to succumb within the walls of the royal palace, but he would die in the village of Zagnanado lit. 'A bad night has fallen' in Fon (in reference to the King's death there).
1859	Oct 25	The first Yoruba language newspaper, "Iwe Irohin Yoruba fun awọn Ara Ẹgba ati Yoruba," lit.: 'A paper of information for the Ẹgba people in the Yoruba country', a bilingual publication in Yoruba and English, and Nigeria's first, was curated by Reverend Henry Townsend in Abẹokuta.
1859		Antebellum to the Ijaye war between the powerful forces of Ibadan and Ijaye. Aare Kurunmi of Ijaye who had dominated the affairs of the city and northwestern Yorubaland for decades refused to recognize the leadership of Adelu as successor to Alaafin Atiba his father. The prelude to the war was an event involving Kakanfo Kurunmi blocking the repatriation of the material possessions of a heirless and Intestate deceased woman of great wealth from Ijanna to Ọyọ as was customary, which necessitated Adelu stamp his authority. Kurunmi then ambushed the large force sent from Ọyọ-atiba to retrieve the possessions along the way at Jabata, killing many and capturing many more to become slaves. He then subsequently repudiated all attempts at diplomacy.
1860	April 10	In April, full scale war broke out between two of the great powers of post-Ọyọ empire Yorubaland after Adelu ordered Ijaye's eager rival Ibadan, led by Balogun Ibikunle to declare war on Kurunmi and Ijaye. The Ẹgbas, resentful of Ibadan based on past treatment, sided with ijaye, while Ibadan was supported by the Rẹmọs. Kurunmi died in June 1861 (some accounts say by suicide), after losing all five of his sons in a single day of the war. The war ended with Ijaye's destruction on Mar 17, 1862 after a long siege. In October, Awaye was destroyed for coming to Ijaye's aid. Ijaye's Yoruba northwest segment was then divided up, with Ọyọ taking in parts of Oke-Ogun and Ibadan taking in Ibarapa. As for the people of Ijaye, they were displaced across Yorubaland with many going to Abẹokuta, Ibadan, Ọyọ-atiba, Lagos, etc.
1861	August 6	Lagos is declared a British possession after annexation by the British under the threat of force on August 6. Ọba Dosunmu (Docemo) of Lagos resisted the cession for 11 days while facing the threat of violence on Lagos and its people, but capitulated and signed the Lagos Treaty of Cession. It becomes a colony one year later in 1862 with status of Crown colony.
1863	March 26	After three separate attacks by Governor Freeman in February and March using 126 West India Regiments, 24 Hausa foot soldiers and 41 members of the Royal Navy, the town of Ẹpẹ was taken and a treaty was signed.
1863	July 7	The chiefs of Badagry signed the treaty of cession. Ado-Odo and Oke Ọdan became British possessions.
1864	March 15; Dahomeans at the Wall	Second Dahomey invasion of Abeokuta under king Glele, son of Ghezo with a corp of 10,000 warriors after a previous aborted attempt in 1863. The motive behind the second Egba-Dahomey war might have been to recover the kingdom's royal throne, royal wives, and to avenge the defeat (and subsequent death) of his father, Ghezo. Glele thus considered the destruction of Abẹokuta his life's mission. At any rate, the ill-fated campaign resulted in severe defeat and a total rout of the invading Dahomeans. Between 4,500 and 6,820 members of the invading force were killed, to Abeokuta's 50, while another 1,500 were taken prisoners. Glele abandoned some of his wives and daughters, horse, wardrobe, carriages and treasuries, and the army lost numerous brass guns and new muskets. This left the Dahomey severely weakened and exposed, opening the opportunity for eventual French colonization.
1864		Palma (Orimedu) and 'Leckie'/Lekki (Ileke) became British colonial possessions.
1864	June 29	Samuel Ajayi Crowther becomes the first African Anglican bishop. He was ordained and consecrated by Charles Longley, the Archbishop of Canterbury, at the Canterbury Cathedral. He also earned a Doctor of Divinity degree from The Oxford University in the same year.
1865	March 29	The Egba – Remo war ended. In the previous Ijaye war, the Ẹgbas supported Ijaye while the Rẹmọs supported Ibadan which got its supply of firearms from the lagoon port of Ikorodu which lay right across the Lagos Lagoon (Ọ̀sà). In retaliation, it was besieged by the Egba and Ijebu in 1862. The British under Governor Glover intervened in support of Ikorodu in order to open up trade between Lagos and its Yorubaland interior which the Egba and Ijebu were blockading leading to Lagos's finances suffering. They expel the Egba force and liberate Ikorodu.
1868	March	Ẹgba christian convert refugees were granted land to settle at Ebute Metta by Governor Glover.
1876		The Ekiti-Parapọ (people of the highlands united) society was formed in Lagos to resist Ibadan imperialism and subsequently, support the war effort on the eastern front. They founded the locality of Ayesan in the Ikalẹ country close to the eastern lagoons as a weapons supply entrepot via Ondo into the warfront in 1881.
1876		Ekiti and Ijesha warriors including Ogedengbe of Ilesa, and Aduloju and Falowo of Ado Ekiti conquered towns and villages of the Afenmai in the Kukuruku Hills, penetrating as far as Iruẹkpẹn in Esan. In 1878, Ogedengbe was able to secure the local support of some Ora communities in a local struggle with Iuleha, while other Owans like Otuo fought on the side of Ibadan.
1877	July 30	The Kiriji War (Ogun Ekiti-Parapọ) broke out between Ibadan supported by towns in the former Ọyọ empire e.g Offa, as well as Ọyọ refugee settlements e.g Modakeke versus the Ekiti confederation–Including Ijesha, supported by the Ijẹbu and Ẹgba kingdoms, the Akoko and Igbomina confederations and Ilorin. As the rising Yoruba power, Ibadan wanted to re-create a central state akin to the Ọyọ empire under its control/domination, while the Ekiti, Ijesha, Akoko, Yagba, Ife and Igbomina wanted a Confederation of Yoruba states, equal and bound by their shared ancestry and mutual interests. The high handedness and tyranny of Ibadan land agents and tax collectors (Ajẹlẹs) in the eastern provinces also precipitated resent against Ibadan overlordship.
1878		The City of Lagos had an estimated population of 60,219 people. Its religious composition was 74.37% Orisha adherents (44,788), 17.59% Muslim (10,595) and 8.03% Christian (4,836). Thirteen years later by 1891, the population had grown to 85,607 inhabitants, of which; 63.34% (54,230) were Orisha adherents, 24.65% (21,108) were Muslims and 12% (10,269) were Christians.
1881	Oct 15	Adeyemi I writes the Governor of Lagos W.B Griffiths asking for help against Dahomean raids on the border and in settling the war between the belligerent Ibadan and Ekiti sides. He mentions in the letter that all the border towns are in panic and if the government does not intervene, he would be making an action move against the Dahomeans in the coming dry season. The governor writes a letter to the belligerents but gets no decisive reply from the Ekiti Parapọ.
1885	March 15	The kingdom of Appa becomes a British crown possession.
1885	Oct 24	Ugbo (Ogbo) and Mahin territories become British possessions as territories of the Protectorate of Lagos.
1886		After a first invasion of Ketu in 1883 during an absence of its army away on campaign, Dahomey attacks again and destroys Ile-ketu, capital of the Yoruba Kingdom of Ketu.
1886	Sept 23	The Yoruba peace treaty was signed on September 23 in Imesi-ile, putting an unofficial end to the Kiriji war but skirmishes and hostilities were still going on.
1888	May	On May 15, the kingdom of Igbẹsa entered a treaty of peace, friendship and inclusion in the British Lagos protectorate. Its sovereign territory was defined to include the settlements of; [sic] Agbara, Okegere, Ishon, Idologbo, Idoye, Agau, Ewutagbe, Imuta, Ekpatira, Igbodo, Ekogbo, Moshi and Iteku. On May 22, the Kingdom of Ife, situated between the Ondo Kingdom and Ijesha on the east, the Ondo and Ijẹbu kingdoms to the south, acquired Ibadan territories to the north, and bound by the Osun River on the west entered a treaty of free trade, peace and friendship with the British. On May 28, the Kingdom of Itebu between Oketoro and the Ọfara river entered a treaty of free trade, peace and friendship with the British, signed by Ọba Manuwa and his chiefs. On May 29, the Kingdom of Ketu between Dahomey and the Ọyan river (Ogun tributary) entered a treaty of peace, friendship and inclusion in the Lagos protectorate with the British.
1888	July 21	The Kingdom of Ilaro entered a treaty of peace, friendship and inclusion in the Lagos protectorate with the British, signed by Ọba Olugbenle and his chiefs. The following settlements were listed as principal towns within the kingdom; [sic] Ilaro, Ajilete, Pahai, Ijalo, Itolu, Gbotodu, Epoto, Igbogu, Ilugboro, Igbin, Iwoye, Ibeshe, Ijana, Ipake, Idode, Ilobinuwa, Ikernon, Ilobi, Palaka, Shasha, Mori, Akaba, Eredo, Ologuntaba, Pakaso and Inonkere. It becomes a protectorate on August 13, 1891.
	July 23	Alaafin Adeyemi I with Samuel Johnson and William Moseri as witnesses signed a treaty of free and legitimate trade, friendly relations and development with the British crown. The territory of Oyo at the time was defined to include the towns of; [sic] Ọyọ, Awẹ, Akinmarin, Ilọra, Iseyin, Papa, Tede and the Shabẹ country. The Alaafin's independence came to a clear end by 1896 after the Bower incident in Ọyọ and the punitive expedition that followed.
1889	Aug 10	The Anglo-French border convention divides up Yorubaland, with the Yoruba kingdoms furthest west falling on one side of the new international border.
1892	May 19	British colonial forces defeat the Ijebu Kingdom at the Anglo-Ijebu war (battle of Imagbon) and incorporated the kingdom into the British Empire. Subsequently, the southern portions of the Ijẹbu homeland consisting of the Lekki Lagoon and the lands between it and the Atlantic ocean (Ẹ̀hìn Ọ̀sà) was made an integral part of the Lagos colony. On the 9th of November 1894, British sovereignty was proclaimed over Ijebu Ode, capital of the kingdom, and the Ijẹbu territories north of the Lagos and Lekki lagoons.
1893	March 14	Final end of hostilities at the Kiriji war. The Ilọrin camp at Ọffa; Ibadan camp at Ikirun and the Ekiti-Parapọ Confederates at Imẹsi-ile finally dispersed after a meeting with Captain Bower.
1895	Nov 8	A punitive expedition was led by the British resident officer, Captain Bower on Ọyọ. Bower moved upon Ọyọ with a detachment of soldiers asking that Kudefu, an Ilari which had been involved in a local judicial case at Okeho (which involved the castration of a local involved in a sexual offence) be given up and that the Alaafin apologize for inhumanity. In an attempt to preserve their independence, the Alaafin and his chiefs refused outrightly. Subsequently, there was an attack on Bower and his troops leading to the military bombardment and shelling of the town by cannons and maxim guns. The palace and the chiefs' houses were destroyed and the Alaafin was hit on the knee.
1897	February	Ilorin was attacked and captured by the British forces of the Royal Niger Company after they attacked a local British garrison at the Odo Ọtin (Otin River) and failed.
1897		Anglican priest Rev. Samuel Johnson, a native of Ọyọ born to a liberated Yoruba in Freetown, completes work on the original copy of the magnum opus titled; The History of the Yorubas, in which he endeavored to record the oral traditions and history of the Yoruba, which he feared were fast fading into obscurity. Lost, rewritten, and then narrowly escaping destruction during WWI, his work became the most influential volume about the Yoruba-speaking people.
1898	Sept 19	Lagos gets connected to, and lit by Electricity, 17 years after its introduction in England. Total power generation at that time was 60 kilowatts (kW). It supplied the Lagos marina from the Government House to the north side of the island. The railway link between Lagos and Abeokuta opens as part of the premier railway link in Nigeria.
1900		The railway link between the cities of Lagos and Ibadan gets completed, It opens to transport the following year (March 4, 1901) as part of the premier rail line in Nigeria. The line was extended to Osogbo in 1907 and Jebba in 1909.

== 20th century AD ==
Year	Image	Event
1901		The 2,600 ft Carter Bridge connecting the Islands of Iddo and Lagos, and the 917 ft Denton bridge linking Iddo and Ebute Metta on the mainland were completed (construction started in 1895). At the time of their completion, they were the only bridge connections between Lagos, Iddo and any part of the mainland, and transport had previously been done by boats.
1901	Nov 26	Slavery was declared illegal in Yorubaland.
1903	Feb 28	Ọọni Olubuṣe I visits Lagos on the invitation of the colonial government to settle the case between the Akarigbo and the Ẹlẹpẹ of Ẹpẹ-Shagamu on the right to wear a crown in Rẹmọ. The Ẹlẹpẹ had claimed the right to, but the Akarigbo disagreed on the grounds that Ẹlẹpẹs do not own a traditional crown, (Adé) from Ife. His departure marked the first time the king was leaving the Ife Kingdom, and out of respect, all the Ọbas in the interior including the Alaafin also vacated their palaces until the Ọọni returned.
1906	May 1	The colony and protectorate of Lagos was amalgamated with the protectorate of southern Nigeria, with Sir Walter Egerton as the first governor.
1907		Works started on the expansion of the Lagos harbour to make it accessible to much larger seafaring vessels. Subsequently in 1913, the Lagos seaport complex at Apapa was established and commissioned.
1907		The Apapa Hoard, a collection of medieval era bronzes from the Kingdom of Owo, the biggest piece of which was similar to one from florescence-era Ife (ram head from Òkè-Ẹ̀ṣọ) was found at Apapa near Lagos, dating to the early 1500s (early 16th Century). Items from the treasure collection consist entirely of bronze jewellery, including bracelets designed in the form of wires, interlocking animals, staff-mounts with pendant bells, ring-shaped armlets, bells, a ring with cascabels and a breast plate in the shape of a ram's head with pendant bells. It is one of the finest cast bronzes ever found in southern Nigeria.
1918	June 13	The Adubi war or uprising (Ogun Adubi) breaks out in Ẹgba land against the British colonial administration. The cause was the imposition of taxation through direct taxes introduced by the colonial government along with existing forced labour obligations and fees. At the end of the uprising, 598 had been killed and 70 Ẹgba chiefs arrested.
1921		Obadiah Johnson eventually succeeds in publishing a re-compiled version of his brother's original work under the title “The History of the Yorubas from the Earliest Times to the Beginning of the British Protectorate”. Regarding the status of the original manuscripts, Obadiah had this to say; "A singular misfortune...befell the original manuscripts of this history, in consequence of which the author never lived to see in print his more than 20 years of labour." The manuscripts were sent to an English publisher in London, England, through a missionary society in 1899 but, "nothing more was heard of them".
1921		Commercial deposits of Gold was discovered in the Ife-Ilesha division.
1931		Nine out of the ten largest cities in Nigeria were in Yorubaland. These nine cities contained 28.4% of the Yoruba population. 15.3% lived in cities over 100K, 36.6% lived in 25 cities over 25K and 45.9% in settlements over 10,000 inhabitants, making them the most urbanized large ethnicity in Africa, with an urbanization Index similar to the USA. In 1952, their biggest cites were; Ibadan: 459,196; Lagos: 267,407; Ogbomosho: 139,535; Oshogbo: 122,698; Ife: 110,790; Iwo: 100,006; Abeokuta: 84,451; Ọyọ: 72,133; Ilesha: 72,029; Iseyin: 49,680; Ẹdẹ: 44,808; Ilorin: 41,000; Ijebu Ode: 27,909; Ikirun: 23,874; Ikire: 20,920 and Ondo: 20,859.
1937	March 31	The inaugural Conference of Yoruba Ọbas was held in Ọyọ, the first of its kind in Yoruba history. The Ọọni became the permanent president while the Alaafin hosted. The Ọbas sat in a horseshoe, with the Ọọni at the center, as the head of the town from which all Yorubas sprung, while the Alaafin and the Ọmọ n'Ọba sat on the western/left and eastern/right flanks at both ends, an arrangement recorded to be satisfactory to all present. Subsequent editions held in 1938 in Ife – the Ọọni was both president and host, 1939 in Ibadan – the Alaafin was chief host, 1940 in Abeokuta – the Alake hosted, 1941 in Ijebu Ode – the Awujale hosted, 1942 in Benin City – the Ọmọ n'Ọba hosted. The 1943 and 1944 editions held in Ibadan because of ongoing WWII. In 1951 the conference was re-constituted, with more than 300 Ọbas and chiefs in attendance. The conference laid the foundation for the Western region House of chiefs which was established later in 1954.
1939	Feb 3	The Western Region of Nigeria was officially created as one of the original three regional federating units of the Federation of Nigeria. Its capital was in the city of Ibadan.
1945		Egbe Omo Oduduwa – “Society of the Descendants of Oduduwa” was formed to enhance Yoruba culture and unity. In 1948 it held its inaugural conference in Ife and grew in popularity. On April 28, 1951 in the town of Owo, Ẹgbẹ Ọmọ Odùduwà supported the formation of the Nigerian Political Party Action Group to promote Yoruba political interests.
1954	July 7	The Lagos Federal district or Federal Capital Territory was established based on the provisions of the 1954 Lyttleton constitution on land hitherto administered as part of the Western region. The territory covered 27 sq mi (70 km^{2}) of land centred on Lagos Island.
1967	May 27	The Western Region of Nigeria was officially subdivided into Western State and Lagos State by General Yakubu Gowon after the regional system of government was abolished. The Ikẹja, Badagry, Ikorodu and Ẹpẹ divisions from the Western region were added to the Lagos Federal Capital Territory to create Lagos state.
1976	Feb 3	The Western State of Nigeria was broken up to produce the three new states of; Ogun, Ondo and Oyo.
1991	Aug 27	The new state of Osun was created out of the old Oyo state, with capital at Osogbo.
1996	Oct 1	The new state of Ekiti was created out of the old Ondo state, with capital at Ado Ekiti.

== 21st century AD ==
Year	Image	Event
2015	Dec 7	Ọba Ọjájá II CFR was crowned 51st Ọọni, traditional head and ruler of the Ifẹ kingdom after completing the associated traditional rites.
2019	Dec 14	Ọba Ogunoye III was crowned 33rd Ọlọwọ (Ọgwa), traditional head and ruler of the Ọwọ kingdom after completing the associated traditional rites.
2023	August 20	After several years of persistent protests and lobby, the Yoruba indigenous belief system, Ìṣẹ̀ṣe gains official recognition by the governments of four states in Southwestern Nigeria; (Ọyọ, Ọṣun, Lagos, and Ogun) with an annual regional holiday called "Isese Day" to be celebrated every 20 August. This marked the first recognition of its nature in Nigeria.
2025	March 13	The government of the Republic of Benin passes a law formalizing 16 kingdoms, 80 superior chiefdoms and 10 customary chiefdoms as those officially recognized by the state out of more than 300. According to the government, the law intends to "Give traditional chieftaincy its rightful role in building a new Benin that relies on its heritage to meet contemporary challenges". Among the 16 kingdoms with historically centralized power and established territories as at 1894, four are of immediate Yoruba provenance; Igbo Idaasha, Ketu, Itakete (Sakete) and Shabẹ (Savè). Several others were designated 'superior chiefdoms'.
2025	April 5	Ọba Ẹlẹ́wù Ẹtù I was crowned as the 46th Alaafin, traditional ruler of Ọyọ after completing all the associated traditional rites and following a three year Interregnum.
2025	July 13	Ọba Ọgbagba Agbọtẹwọle II, the Awujale of Ijebu Ode, capital of the Ijebu Kingdom, Sikiru Kayode Adetona from the Anikinaiya royal house dies at the age of 91 after a reign lasting 65 years. He was one of the longest reigning traditional monarchs in Nigeria (he was crowned in January 1960 at the age of 26).

== Bibliography ==
- Page, Willie F. (2005). Davis, R. Hunt (ed.). Encyclopedia of African History And Culture, Volume 3. p. 38.
- Akinjogbin, I. A. (1998). War and Peace in Yorubaland, 1793-1893. Heinemann Educational Books (Nigeria). p. 215. ISBN 978-978-129-497-6.
- Ogundiran, Akinwumi (2020). The Yoruba: A New History. Indiana University Press. pp. 1–532. doi:10.2307/j.ctv177thv2. ISBN 978-0-253-05149-3. JSTOR j.ctv177thv2.
- Falola, Toyin (2004). Sources and Methods in African History: Spoken, Written, Unearthed. University Rochester Press. pp. 49–52. ISBN 978-1-58046-140-5.
- Usman, Aribidesi (4 July 2019). The Yoruba from Prehistory to the Present. Cambridge University Press. pp. 1–450. ISBN 978-1-107-06460-7.
- Breunig, Peter; Magnavita, Sonja; Neumann, Katharina (16 October 2018). Two Thousand Years in Dendi, Northern Benin: Archaeology, History and Memory. BRILL. p. 290. ISBN 978-90-04-37669-4.
- Babalola, Abidemi Babatunde; et al. (1 February 2018). "Chemical analysis of glass beads from Igbo Olokun, Ile-Ife (SW Nigeria): New light on raw materials, production, and interregional interactions". Journal of Archaeological Science. 90: 92–105. Bibcode:2018JArSc..90...92B. doi:10.1016/j.jas.2017.12.005. hdl:1911/99290.
- Apter, Andrew (15 April 1992). Black Critics and Kings: The Hermeneutics of Power in Yoruba Society. University of Chicago Press. pp. 31–34. ISBN 978-0-226-02342-7.
- Huera, Carmen (1988). Historia Universal del Arte: África, América y Asia, Arte Primitivo. Barcelona: Planeta. ISBN 978-8432066900.
- Akintoye, Stephen Adebanji (1 January 2010). A History of the Yoruba People. Amalion Publishing. pp. 1–510. ISBN 978-2-35926-027-4.
- Bulmer-Thomas, V. (2006). The Cambridge Economic History of Latin America Volume 1, The Colonial Era and the Short Nineteenth Century. Cambridge University Press. ISBN 978-0-521-81289-4.
- Ikime, Obaro (1980). Groundwork of Nigerian History; Historical Society of Nigeria. Historical Society of Nigeria. p. 133. ISBN 978-978-129-954-4.
- Blier, Suzanne Preston (2 November 2017). Art and Risk in Ancient Yoruba: Ife History, Power, and Identity, c. 1300. Cambridge University Press. ISBN 978-1-107-72917-9.
- Usman, Aribidesi A. (2003). "Ceramic Seriation, Sites Chronology, and Old Oyo Factor in Northcentral Yorubaland, Nigeria". The African Archaeological Review. 20 (3): 149–169. doi:10.1023/A:1025673401280. ISSN 0263-0338. JSTOR 25130772.
- Law, Robin (1986). "Early European Sources Relating to the Kingdom of Ijebu (1500-1700): A Critical Survey". History in Africa. 13: 245–260. doi:10.2307/3171544. ISSN 0361-5413. JSTOR 3171544.
- Lasisi, Olanrewaju (1 January 2016). "New Lights on the Archaeology of Sungbo's Eredo, South-Western Nigeria". Journal of the Finders Archaeological Society.
- Darling, P. J. (1997). "Sungbo's Eredo: Africa's largest monument" (PDF). Archaeologydataservice.ac.uk. 62 (3-4) (The Nigerian Field 62 (3-4)): 113–129.
- Bradbury, R. E. (1959). "Chronological Problems in the Study of Benin History". Journal of the Historical Society of Nigeria. 1 (4): 276. ISSN 0018-2540. JSTOR 41970638.
- Aderinto, Saheed (24 August 2017). African Kingdoms: An Encyclopedia of Empires and Civilizations. Bloomsbury Publishing USA. pp. 123–125. ISBN 978-1-61069-580-0.
- Akintoye, S.A. (1971). Revolution and Power Politics in Yorubaland 1840–1893. USA: Humanities Press Inc.
- Forde, Daryll (3 February 2017). The Yoruba-Speaking Peoples of South-Western Nigeria: Western Africa Part IV. Routledge. ISBN 978-1-315-29760-6.
- Smith, Robert (1965). "The Alafin in Exile: A Study of the Igboho Period in Oyo History". The Journal of African History. 6 (1): 57–77. doi:10.1017/S0021853700005338. ISSN 0021-8537. JSTOR 179647.
- Olorunyomi, Sola (2003). Afrobeat!: Fela and the Imagined Continent. Africa World Press. p. 70. ISBN 978-1-59221-096-1.
- Oloidi, Sola (1994). Sir Olateru Olagbegi II KBE: The Legendary King. Mednet Limited. p. 4. ISBN 978-978-024-001-1.
- Smith, Robert Sydney (1976). Kingdoms of the Yoruba. Methuen. ISBN 978-0-416-84710-9.
- Johnson, Samuel (1966). The History of the Yorubas: From the Earliest Times to the Beginning of the British Protectorate. Cambridge University Press. ISBN 978-1-108-02099-2.
- Burns, A. C. (1929). History Of Nigeria (1929).
- Douglas, Mary (1969). Man in Africa. Psychology Press. p. 17. ISBN 978-0-415-26394-8.
- Holbrook, Jarita (2008). African Cultural Astronomy: Current Archaeoastronomy and Ethnoastronomy research in Africa. Springer Science & Business Media. ISBN 978-1-4020-6639-9.
- Law, Robin (1983). "Trade and Politics behind the Slave Coast: The Lagoon Traffic and the Rise of Lagos, 1500-1800". The Journal of African History. 24 (3): 321–348. doi:10.1017/S0021853700022040. JSTOR 181898.
- Law, Robin (1997). "Ethnicity and the Slave Trade: "Lucumi" and "Nago" as Ethnonyms in West Africa". History in Africa. 24: 205–219. doi:10.2307/3172026. JSTOR 3172026.
- Lovejoy, Henry B. (2015). "'Lucumí, 'Terranova', and the Origins of the Yoruba Nation". The Journal of African History. 56 (3): 353–372. doi:10.1017/S0021853715000328. JSTOR 44509218.
- Haour, A. (June 2016). "The settlement mound of Birnin Lafiya: new evidence from the eastern arc of the Niger River". Antiquity. 90 (351): 289–290. doi:10.15184/aqy.2016.7. ISSN 0003-598X.
- Geary, Sir William M. N. (19 December 2013). Nigeria Under British Rule (1927). Routledge. ISBN 978-1-136-96301-8.
- Burns, Sir Alan (3 May 2023). History of Nigeria. Taylor & Francis. ISBN 978-1-000-85681-1.
- Tomori, Lola (2012). Origin of Ibadan Land. Archived from the original on 14 March 2023.
- Law, R. C. C. (1970). "The Chronology of the Yoruba Wars of the Early Nineteenth Century: A Reconsideration". Journal of the Historical Society of Nigeria. 5 (2): 211–222. JSTOR 41856842.
- Peel, John David Yeadon (2003). Religious Encounter and the Making of the Yoruba. Indiana University Press. p. 30. ISBN 978-0-253-21588-8.
- Office, Great Britain Colonial (1896). The Colonial Office List for ... Harrison. p. 142.
- Talbot, P.A (1969). The peoples of Southern Nigeria: a sketch of their history, ethnology and languages with an abstract of the 1921 census. F. Cass.
- Law, Robin (1993). "The 'Amazons' of Dahomey". Paideuma. 39: 245–260. JSTOR 40341664.
- Ajayi, J. F. Ade (1976). History of West Africa. Columbia University Press. p. 246. ISBN 978-0-231-04103-4.
- Blier, Suzanne Preston (1985). "Kings, Crowns, and Rights of Succession: Obalufon Arts at Ife and Other Yoruba Centers" (PDF). Art Bulletin. 67 (3).
- Olukoju, Ayodeji (25 September 2023). Politics, Economy, and Society in Twentieth-Century Nigeria. Lexington Books. pp. 99–117. ISBN 978-1-6669-2997-3.
- Ade Ajayi, J F. (1965). A Thousand Years of West African History. Ibadan University Press. p. 37.
- Logan, Amanda L. (10 September 2024). "Early archaeological evidence of wheat and cotton from medieval Ile-Ife, Nigeria". Proceedings of the National Academy of Sciences. 121 (37) e2403256121. Bibcode:2024PNAS..12103256L. doi:10.1073/pnas.2403256121. PMC 11406262. PMID 39186667.
- Adejuyigbe, Ọmọlade (1970). "The Case for a New Federal Capital in Nigeria". The Journal of Modern African Studies. 8 (2): 301–306. doi:10.1017/S0022278X00019741. JSTOR 159396.
- McKenzie, Peter (14 August 2023). Hail Orisha!: A Phenomenology of a West African Religion in the Mid-Nineteenth Century. BRILL. ISBN 978-90-04-66468-5.
- Great Britain Foreign and Commonwealth, Office (1888). British and Foreign State Papers. H.M. Stationery Office.
- Magnavita, Sonja (2024). "LA-ICP-MS analysis of glass beads from Tié (12th–14th centuries), Kanem, Chad: Evidence of trans-Sudanic exchanges". Archaeometry. 66 (1): 100–118. Bibcode:2024Archa..66..100M. doi:10.1111/arcm.12898. ISSN 1475-4754.
- Akinjogbin, I. A. (1967). Dahomey and its neighbours, 1708-1818. Cambridge, Cambridge U.P. p. 124.
- Akinola, G. A. (1976). The Origin of the Eweka Dynasty of Benin: A Study in the Use and Abuse of Oral Traditions. Vol. 8. Historical Society of Nigeria. p. 31. JSTOR 41971248.
- Ajayi, Ade J.F.; Crowder, Michael (1985). History of West Africa. Burnt Mill, Harlow, Essex, England : Longmann. p. 293. ISBN 978-0-582-64683-4.
- "Odu (New Series)". Odu: A Journal of West African Studies. New Series (35). University of Ifẹ Press: 213. 1989.
- Bravmann, René A. (31 May 1974). Islam and Tribal Art in West Africa. CUP Archive. p. 37. ISBN 978-0-521-20192-6.
