= Olukoya =

- Pronunciation: IPA: [ōlúkɔ̀jà]
- Gender: Unisex (primarily masculine)
- Language: Yoruba

Origin
- Meaning: 'God defends, God rejects suffering'
- Region of origin: Southwest Nigeria

Other names
- Pet names: Koya, Oluwakoya

Olukoya (Yoruba: Olúkọ̀yà, pronounced [ōlúkɔ̀jà], lit. 'God defends, God rejects suffering') is a Nigerian surname and unisex (though primarily masculine) given name. It is most common among the Ijebu people of southwest Nigeria. The name also has two diminutive forms, Koya (Kọ̀yà) and Oluwakoya (Olúwakọ̀yà).

Notable people with the name include:

== Surname ==
- Daniel Kolawole Olukoya (born 1957), Nigerian pastor, scientist and professor
- Esther Taiwo Olukoya (1913–2018), Nigerian twin
- Sunday Abiodun Olukoya (1949–2021), Nigerian navy admiral

== Given name ==
- Victor Oluwakoya Emitam Kunda (born 1999), English internet personality and model
- Olukoya Ogen (born 1968), Nigerian professor and historian
