= Oloyede =

Oloyede is a Nigerian name.

== Family name ==
- Bimbo Oloyede, veteran Nigerian TV journalist and producer.
- Is-haq Oloyede (born 1954), professor of Islamic Studies, former Vice Chancellor of the University of Ilorin, Nigeria.
- Mufutau Oloyede Abdul-Rahmon, Nigerian professor of Arabic and Islamic Studies.

== First name ==
- Oloyede Adeyeoba, traditional ruler of the Okeluse kingdom, in Ondo State, Nigeria.
