= History of the Yoruba people =

The documented history begins when Oranyan came to rule the Oyo Empire, which became dominant in the early 17th century. The older traditions of the formerly dominant Ile-Ife kingdom are largely oral.

The name "Yoruba" is said to be given to the people of the left bank of the Niger River, gotten from the demotic "Yarba" (same as the Hausa term "Yarriba") firstly mentioned in the work of Capt. Clapperton (Travels and Discoveries in Northern and Central Africa, 1822 - 1824) and referenced much later by Rev. Samuel Johnson (The History of The Yorubas). Prior to the generalization, each Yoruba tribes were called by native names, and the denotation was mainly for the Oyo.

== Ife Empire ==
While the precise timeline is unknown, archaeological evidence points to settlements in Ile-Ife dating back as early as the 10th to 6th century BCE. The city gradually transitioned into a more urban center around the 4th to 7th centuries CE. By the 8th century, a powerful city-state had formed. Under now deified figures such as Odùduwà, Ife grew to new heights, its influence extending across a vast swathe of what is now southwestern Nigeria. laying the foundation for the eventual rise of the Ife Empire (circa 1200–1420). However, he was not the first king of the Yoruba people.

The period between 1200 and 1400 is often referred to as the "golden age" of Ile-Ife, marked by exceptional artistic production, economic prosperity, and urban development. The city's artisans excelled in crafting exquisite sculptures from bronze, terracotta, and stone. These works, renowned for their naturalism and technical mastery, were not only objects of aesthetic appreciation but also likely held religious significance, potentially reflecting the cosmology and belief systems of the Ife people.

This artistic tradition coincided with Ile-Ife's role as a major commercial hub. The Ife Empire's strategic location facilitated its participation in extensive trade networks that spanned West Africa. Of note is the evidence of a thriving glass bead industry in Ile-Ife. Archaeological excavations have unearthed numerous glass beads, indicating local production and pointing to the existence of specialized knowledge and technology. These beads, particularly the dichroic beads known for their iridescent qualities, were highly sought-after trade items, found as far afield as the Sahel region, demonstrating the far-reaching commercial connections of the Ife Empire.

The wealth generated through trade fuelled the remarkable urban development witnessed in Ile-Ife. Archaeological evidence points to a well-planned city with impressive infrastructure, including paved roads and sophisticated drainage systems, a distinctive feature of Ife urban planning was the use of potsherd pavements. These pavements, created using fragments of broken pottery, were not merely functional but also suggest a concern for aesthetics and urban design. The scale and sophistication of Ile-Ife's urban landscape highlight the empire's economic prosperity and the complex social organization needed to support a large, concentrated population. The Ife Empire declined around the 15th century.

== Oyo Empire ==
Ife was surpassed by the Oyo Empire as the dominant Yoruba military and political power between 1600 and 1800 AD. The nearby Benin Empire was also a powerful force between 1300 and 1850.

Oyo developed in the 17th century and become one of the largest Yoruba kingdoms, while Ile-Ife remained as a religiously significant rival to its power at the site of the divine creation of the earth in Yoruba mythology. After Oduduwa's ascension in Ile-Ife, he had a son. This son later became the first ruler of the Oyo empire.

The Oyo kingdom subjugated the kingdom of Dahomey. It traded with European merchants on the coast through Ajase. The wealth of the empire increased, and its political leader's wealth increased as well. This state of affairs continued until Oba Abiodun, Oyo's last great ruler, engaged his opponents in a bitter civil war that had a ruinous effect on economic development and the trade with the European merchants. The downfall of the kingdom came soon after, as Abiodun became concerned with little other than the display of royal wealth. Oyo's empire had collapsed by the 1830s.

Like Oyo itself, most of the surrounding city states were controlled by Obas, elected priestly monarchs, and councils made up of Oloyes, recognised leaders of royal, noble, and often even common descent, who joined them in ruling over the kingdoms through a series of guilds and cults. Different states saw differing ratios of power between the kingship and the chiefs' council. Some, such as Oyo, had powerful, autocratic monarchs with almost total control, while in others such as the Ijebu city-states, the senatorial councils were supreme and the Ọba served as something of a figurehead.

In all cases, however, Yoruba monarchs were subject to the continuing approval of their constituents as a matter of policy, and could be easily compelled to abdicate for demonstrating dictatorial tendencies or incompetence. The order to vacate the throne was usually communicated through an àrokò or symbolic message, which usually took the form of parrots' eggs delivered in a covered calabash bowl by the Oloyes.

== Modern history ==
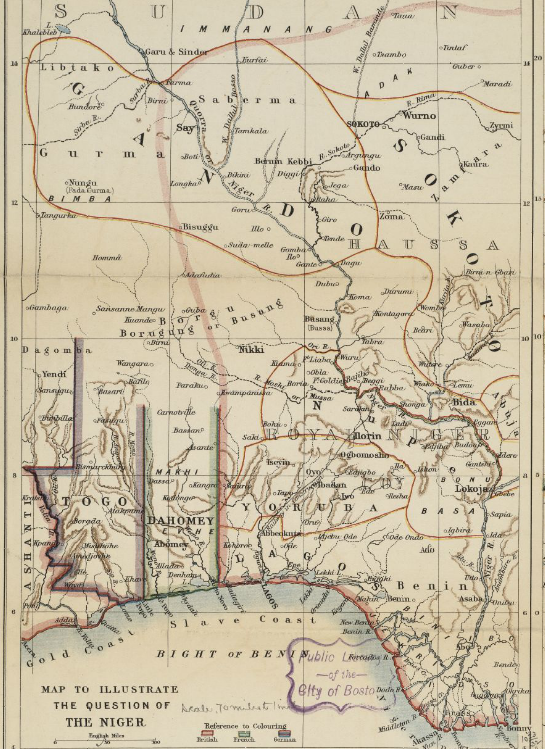
Map of Yoruba people, West Africa (Nigeria), 1898

The Yoruba eventually established a federation of city-states under the political ascendancy of the city state of Oyo, located on the Northern fringes of Yorubaland in the savanna plains between the forests of present Southwest Nigeria and the Niger River.

Following a jihad led by Uthman Dan Fodio and a rapid consolidation of the Hausa city states of contemporary northern Nigeria, the Fula Sokoto Caliphate invaded and annexed the buffer Nupe Kingdom. It then began to advance southwards into Ọyọ lands. Shortly afterwards, its armies overran the Yoruba military capital of Ilorin, and then sacked and destroyed Ọyọ-Ile, the royal seat of the Ọyọ Empire.

Following this, Ọyọ-Ile was abandoned, and the Ọyọ retreated south to the present city of Oyo (formerly known as "Ago d'oyo", or "Oyo Atiba") in a forested region where the cavalry of the Sokoto Caliphate was less effective. Further attempts by the Sokoto Caliphate to expand southwards were checked by the Yoruba who had rallied in defense under the military leadership of the ascendant Ibadan clan, which rose from the old Oyo Empire, and of the Ijebu city-states.

However, the Oyo hegemony had been dealt a mortal blow. The other Yoruba city-states broke free of Oyo dominance, and subsequently became embroiled in a series of internecine conflicts that soon metamorphosed into a full scale civil war. These events weakened the Yoruba country considerably as the British Colony of Lagos pursued harsh methods to bring an end to the civil war in the country. In 1893, greater Yorubaland was subsumed into the British Protectorate, colonial Nigeria. The historical records of the Yoruba, which became more accessible in the nineteenth century with the more permanent arrival of the Europeans, tell of heavy jihad raids by the mounted Fula warriors of the north as well as of endemic intercity warfare amongst the Yoruba themselves. Archaeological evidence of the greatness of their ancient civilization in the form of, amongst other things, impressive architectural achievements like Sungbo's Eredo that are centuries old, nevertheless abound.

== Major towns, cities, and the diaspora ==
Many Yoruba people organize themselves into villages, towns, and cities in the form of kingdoms. Major cities include Ile-Ife, Oyo, Ila-Orangun, Eko(Lagos), Abeokuta, Ipokia, Ibadan, Ijebu-Ode, Iwo, and Akure etc. Some towns and cities of the Yoruba people are collectively considered to be clans due to similarities in their origins and cultures. Several other cities, though non-Yoruba, have histories of being influenced by the Yoruba. These cities are Warri, Benin City, Okene, and Auchi.

The Yoruba diaspora has two main groupings. The first one is composed of the recent immigrants that moved to the United States and the United Kingdom after the political and economic changes in the 1960s and 1980s. The second group is much older, and is composed of descendants of enslaved Yoruba who were forcibly brought to the United States, Cuba, Trinidad, Brazil, Grenada, and other countries in the Caribbean and South America during the Atlantic Slave Trade in the 19th century.

Much like in the case of Yorubaland itself, many people who belong to the Yoruba diaspora are Muslims or Christians. Yoruba traditional worship remains influential in diaspora communities, however.

== See also ==
- Timeline of Yoruba history

== Bibliography ==
- Adebayo Kayode "After Oduduwa"???
- Akintoye, Stephen Adebanji: A History of the Yoruba People, Dakar, 2010.
- Idowu, Bolaji E. : "Olodumare: God in Yoruba Belief" Wazobia, New York, NY 1994 ISBN 1-886832-00-5.
- Idowu, Bolaji: Olodumare: God in Yoruba Belief, London 1962.
- Johnson, Samuel: History of the Yorubas, London 1921.
- Lucas, Jonathan Olumide "The Religion of the Yorubas", Lagos 1948.
- Law, Robin: The Oyo Empire, c. 1600 – c. 1836, Oxford 1977.
- Smith, Robert: Kingdoms of the Yoruba, 1st ed. 1969, 3rd ed. London 1988.
