= Gbedegi =

The Gbedegi or Gbede are one of the eleven or twelve traditional subgroups of the Nupe people of North Central Nigeria. The Gbedegi were originally a Yoruba subgroup, who lived on both sides of the Niger River's upper and middle stretch (above and below), but one which gradually went through assimilation and started shifting to the Nupe language, beginning in the period when Tsoede became the king of the Nupe people, and centralized the Nupe Kingdom in the 16th century. The distinct Gbedegi language continued to be spoken up until the turn of the 20th century.

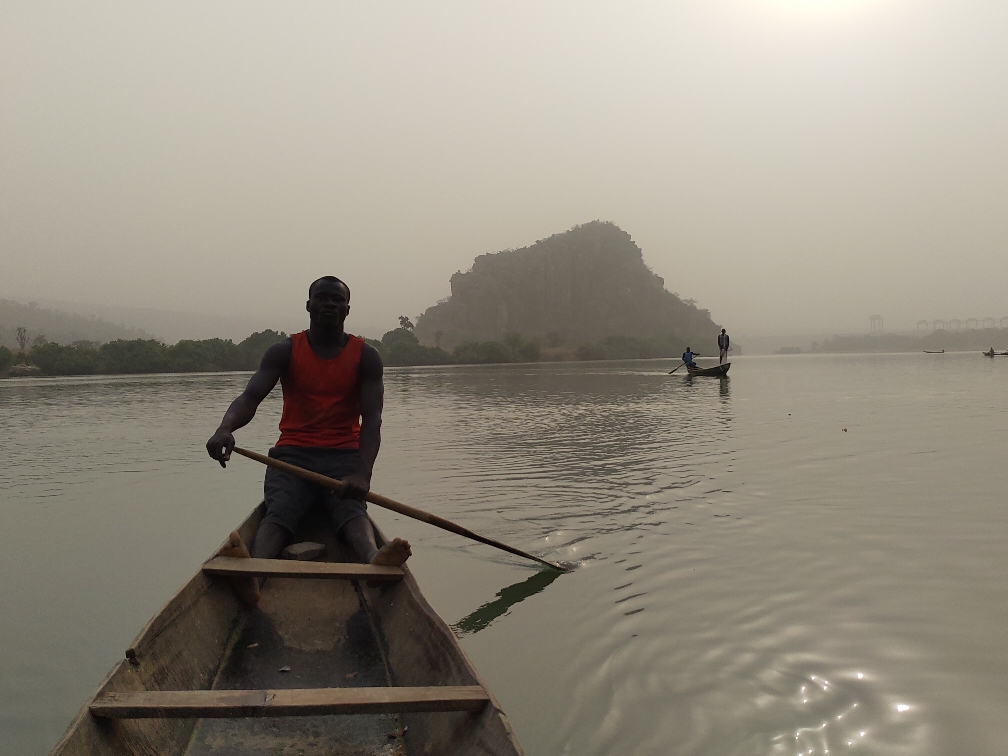
Ketsa (Oke Osha), now called 'Juju Rock' in the middle of the Niger.

British explorer Hugh Clapperton had earlier recorded the existence of the language, later on during the expedition down the Niger river in the year 1857, Crowther observed the priest of the local deity of the large rock in the middle of the river, called Ketsa by the Nupe (Okesha in Yoruba), propitiating or invoking it in a Yoruba dialect. Decades later, the expert ethnographer and Nupe historiographer Fred Nadel reported that he was able to find one old man on Jebba Island who spoke a little Gbedegi in 1934/36. However, the language is now extinct and has become fully replaced by Nupe. The people have also become Nupe, although cultural retentions from their past Yoruba roots remain. Today, the Nupe dialect of the Gbedegi towns, together with that of Bida forms the basis of what is considered 'Standard Nupe'.

The riverine community of Rabba on the Niger River, Mokwa, Gbajibo, Bele, Shonga, Ogudu and Tada all belong to the Gbedegi Sub-tribe of the Nupe people. It was in the village of Jebba Gungu on Jebba Island that a sitting Bronze figure of Ife origin was found, while the closely associated bowman and large standing male figure (also of bronze) were found in the nearby village of Tada, 25 miles downstream. According to locals of the area, these brazen figures were actually brought there by the people from Yorubaland in the 'olden times'.

Similarly, the Ebe (who call themselves Asu), another subgroup found in the colonial district of Yelwa in the Northernmost sections of the Nupe also claim to be of Yoruba origin.

== Name ==
The name "Gbedegi" derives from the Yoruba expression "Gbọ Ede", which means lit. "To understand a language". The suffix; '– gi', which means "little" in Nupe was later added. The Nupe people then used this term to describe/refer to people who understood only a little of the Nupe language as Gbedegi.

== Culture ==
The Gbedegi are unique among the Nupe. They are the only subgroup who use the 'Yoruba-esque' Elo and Mamma masks. as well as the Gungun masquerades. These masks have Yoruba tribal marks, including; three vertical lines on either side of the face, an oblique line drown from the nose to the cheek, and three 'cat whisker' marks on both sides of the face converging on the corners of the lip, marks which the Nupe later adopted. The masks and their associated festivals also looks very similar to those of the Egungun and Gelede practice among the Yoruba.

== Bibliography ==
- Nadel, S. F. (Siegfried Frederick) (1965). A black Byzantium; the kingdom of Nupe in Nigeria. London, New York Pub. for the International Institute of African Languages & Cultures by the Oxford University Press. p. 23.
