= Abdulwasiu Omogbolahan Lawal =

Oba Abdulwasiu Omogbolahan Lawal
- Abisogun II, Oniru of Iruland
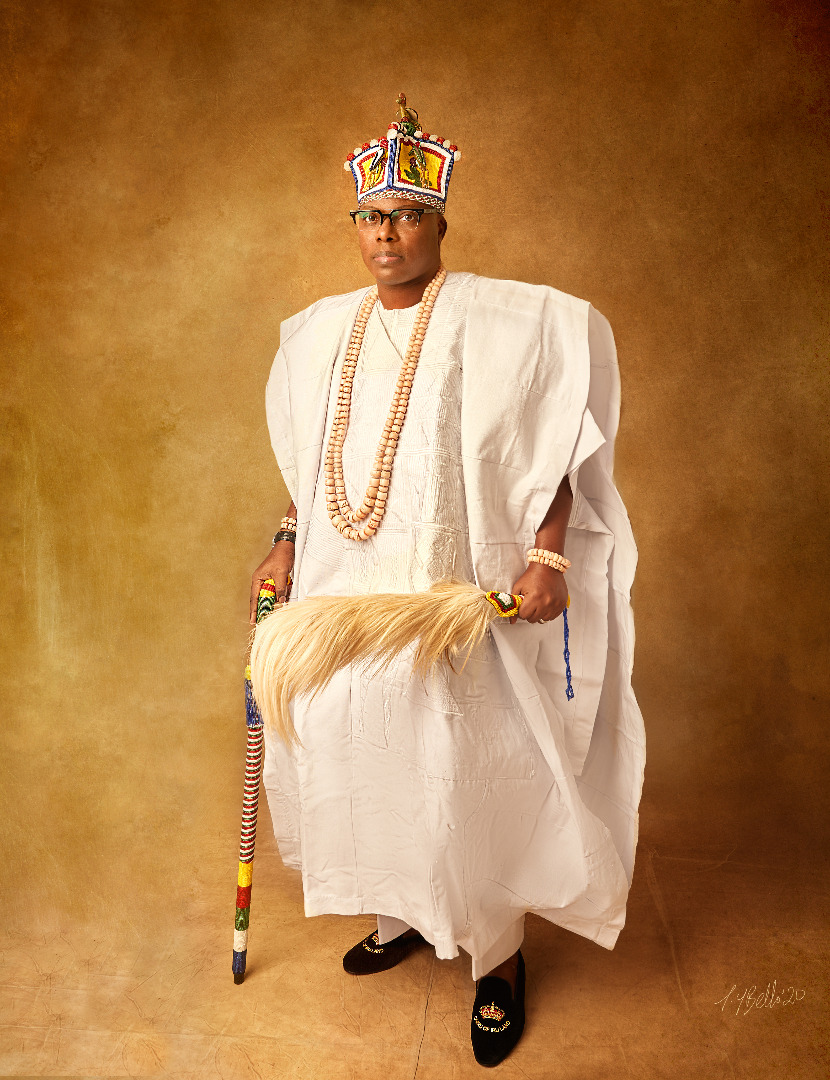
- Reign: 7 June 2020 – present
- Coronation: 6 September 2020
- Predecessor: Oba Idowu Abiodun Oniru (Akiogun II)
- Born: 24 July 1970 (age 56)
Names
- Omogbolahan Abdulwasiu Lawal
- House: Oniru
- Father: Late Chief Taoreed Lawal-Akapo, the Ojora of Lagos
- Mother: Olori Muinat Olabisi Abeni Ajasa Lawal-Akapo
- Occupation: Monarch

His Royal Majesty, Oba Abdulwasiu Omogbolahan Lawal, Abisogun II (born 24 July 1970), is the 15th Oniru of Iruland. He was born to late Chief Taoreed Lawal Akapo, the Ojora of Lagos (1977–1993) and Olori Muinat Olabisi Abeni Ajasa. He is from the Ojora, Aromire, Shokun and Abisogun branch of Oniru royal families of Lagos State. He became the 15th Oniru of Iruland on 7 June 2020 after the death of Oba Idowu Oniru (Akiogun II) in September 2019. He was presented with the staff of Office by Governor Babajide Sanwo-Olu on 7 June. 2020. Prior to his enthronement, he was the Commissioner for Agriculture in Lagos State.

== Early life and education ==
HRM Oba Wasiu Gbolahan was born on 24 July 1970, to Chief Taoreed Lawal-Akapo, who was the Ojora of Lagos from 1977 to 1993 and Alhaja Muinat Olabisi Abeni Ajasa Lawal-Akapo. He attended Holy Trinity Primary School Ebute-Ero from 1976 to 1982 and St. Gregory College Ikoyi from 1982 to 1987 where he obtained his Ordinary Level Certificate from the West African Examinations Council. He proceeded to the University of Port Harcourt, Rivers State from September 1988 to September 1992 where he obtained B.Sc (Hons) in Botany. He then proceeded to the School of Oriental and African Studies (SOAS), University of London, for his M.Sc. in Violence, Conflict and Development. He then received an Executive MSc in Cities from London School of Economics and Political Science in 2020, and took a certificate course on Jobs for a Globalizing World: World Bank Labor Market Policy Global Course at the World Bank Institute, in April 2010. He also took part in a Programme for Senior Executives in National and International Security: Kennedy School of Government, Harvard University, in September 2006, Strategies for Managing Public Private Partnership: European Centre of Advanced & Professional Studies (ECAPS), Cambridge in November 2011. He also attended the Wharton School of the University of Pennsylvania where he took courses on Housing Finance in a changing Global Environment, (International Housing Finance Program) in July 2015 and Wharton Advanced Management Programme (AMP) in June 2018.

== Career ==
From October 1992 to September 1993, he participated in the mandatory one year National Youth Service Corps at Federal Capital Development Authority, in Abuja. From July 1994 to July 1996 he worked at the Raw Materials Research and Development Council, Federal Ministry of Science and Technology. He enlisted in the Nigeria Police Force in August 1996 and was commissioned as Assistant Superintendent of Police by the Nigeria Police Academy. In October 2008, he retired as Superintendent of Police.

In June 1999, he was appointed Aide-de-camp/Escort Commander to the then Governor of Lagos State, Bola Tinubu, and served until 2007 when Tinubu ended his tenure as governor. He was appointed Senior Special Assistant (Special Projects) to Lagos State Governor, Babatunde Fashola from December 2008 to July 2011.

He was reappointed into the cabinet of Governor Babatunde Fashola in July 2011 as the Commissioner for Agriculture and Cooperatives. Governor Akinwunmi Ambode came into office in 2015 and appointed Lawal as the Commissioner for Housing. He was the Commissioner, Lagos State Ministry of Agriculture under the government of Babajide Sanwo-Olu from August 2019 to June 2020.

== Selection and coronation ==
After the death of the 14th Oniru of Iruland, Oba Idowu Abiodun Oniru (Akiogun II) in September 2019, a search began for the new monarch. According to traditions of Iruland, selection for a successor usually begins 41 days after the death of the Oniru. Names of princes from the royal families were submitted for selection and Prince Gbolahan Abdulwasiu Lawal was chosen the 15th Oniru of Iruland. The other princes in line for the throne were Prince Hakeem Ajasa, a serving police officer and Chief Security Officer to Speaker of the House of Representatives, Femi Gbajabiamila, and Aremo Adesegun Oniru, a former Commissioner for Waterfront and Infrastructure in Lagos State. Hakeem Ajasa is from the Abisogun house while Adesegun Oniru is the first son of the 14th Oniru.

On 5 June 2020, Abdulwasiu Omogbbolahan Lawal was selected as the King. Babajide Sanwo-Olu, Governor of Lagos State presented the staff of office to Oba Abdulwasiu Omogbbolahan Lawal, Abisogun II on 7 June 2020 as the 15th Oniru of Iruland. After the presentation of the staff of office by the Governor, he proceeded on a three-month immersion in customary rites and emerged in the Iru palace for his coronation as the 15th Oba of Iruland.

His coronation took place on 6 September 2020 at the Iru Palace in Victoria Island, Lagos. In attendance were Oba Adeyeye Enitan Ogunwusi (Ojaja II), the Ooni of Ife, Oba Saheed Ademola Elegushi (Kusenla III) and APC National Leader, Asiwaju Bola Ahmed Tinubu. The Governor of Lagos State, Babajide Sanwo-Olu was represented by his deputy Dr. Obafemi Hamzat.
