= Apomu =

City in Nigeria

- Town
- Location within Nigeria
- Country: Nigeria
- State: Osun
- LGA: Isokan

Government
  - King: Oba Kayode Afolabi
- Time zone: UTC+1 (WAT)

Apomu is a medium-sized town in Osun State. It had a population of about 71,656 people in 2016.

== History ==
Apomu is a historic Yoruba town in Osun State, South west Nigeria, dating to the 16th century. For about 400 years, it was the only commercial center in the whole Oyo Empire. For its commercial endeavors, Apomu is well-known throughout Yoruba territory.

== Climate ==
In Apomu, the entire year is hot and unpleasant, with the wet season being overcast and the dry season being partly cloudy. The average annual temperature ranges from 19 to 34 degrees Celsius (67 to 94 degrees Fahrenheit), rarely falling below 16 °C (61 °F) or rising over 37 °C (98 °F).

=== Apomu's Hot Temperature ===
From January 21 to April 9, the hot season, with an average daily high temperature exceeding 33 °C (92 °F), lasts for 2.6 months. In Apomu, March is the hottest month of the year, with an average high of 34 °C (93 °F) and low of 23 °C (74 °F).

=== Apomu's Cool Temperature ===
The 3.7-month cool season, which runs from June 15 to October 4, has an average daily maximum temperature of less than 29 °C (85 °F). With an average low of 22 °C (71 °F) and high of 28 °C (83 °F), August is the coldest month of the year in Apomu.

=== Clouds ===
The average proportion of sky that is covered by clouds in Apomu varies significantly seasonally throughout the year.

Beginning from November 16 and lasting for 2.9 months, the clearer season in Apomu ends around February 13.

In Apomu, December is the clearest month of the year, with the sky remaining clear, mostly clear, or partly cloudy 51% of the time.

Beginning around February 13 and lasting for 9.1 months, the cloudier period of the year ends around November 16.

April is the cloudiest month of the year in Apomu, with the sky being overcast or mostly cloudy 86% of the time on average during that month.
