= Itaakpa rock shelter =

Excavated cave in southwestern Nigeria

The Itaakpa rock shelter is an archaeological site located in southwestern Nigeria. It is situated about half of a kilometre (3/10 of a mile) west of the village of Iffe-Ijumu, in the Kogi State of Nigeria. It is in a region with a number of similar rock formations that sheltered Late Stone Age peoples and that are of significant archeological interest.

== Excavations ==
The site was excavated between 1985 and 1988 by a British and Nigerian team. The artifacts found at the shelter, particularly the pottery, suggest a long period of continuous occupation from the Late Stone Age to the Iron Age. The tools, particularly microlithic tools (small, sharp stone tools), indicate a hunter-gatherer lifestyle.

Excavations at Itaakpa have also revealed human remains – a partial human skull consisting of a partial right mandible and maxilla, 12 teeth in situ and nine other isolated teeth, apparently all belonging to a single adult male, probably in his twenties. The teeth appear to be healthy, with no visible cavities or calculus. On the other hand, disturbances to the enamel in some places may indicate episodes of starvation or disease while the enamel was forming. In addition, there is evidence of wear and tear on some teeth. This tooth damage is horizontal and flat, which is typical of hunter- gatherers. This skull has been dated to 2210 Before Present.

An extensive collection of stone tools and chips was also excavated from the shelter. Of the total 'lithic assemblage' of 5830 pieces, all but 31 were of quartz. Twenty-eight quartz tools were identified, including two burins, two awls, two points and 13 side scrapers. Also found on the top and most recent layers were a lump of iron slag, a piece of iron wire and an iron arrowhead; these indicate that iron working took place during the later phases of human occupancy.

== Findings ==
These findings provide insights into the technological and cultural practices of early human inhabitants of the area, such as their hunting and tool-making techniques. For example, analysis of the extensive pottery findings at the site has shed light on the types of pottery produced and the techniques used to produce them. A total of 1257 pottery sherds were found on the site, most of which were very small. No sherds were found in the oldest excavation layers. About half of the sherds (51 percent) were decorated. The decorative devices include surface finishing (20.5 percent); grooving and incision (18.5 percent); and twisted string roulette and grooved/incised (13.8 percent). The archeologists were able to identify four vessel forms – small globular pitchers, larger pitchers (possibly used for cooking); large water storage pots and shallow bowls, probably used for frying foods. Microscopic examination of the sherds shows that some used organic matter as temper (matter mixed with clay to reduce shrinkage and prevent cracking during the firing process). By tracking the sherds over time, archeologists were able to assert that "there was some development in pottery technology over time."

The discoveries in the Itaakpa rock shelter contribute to what is, at the present time, a relatively small database about the Late Stone Age inhabitants of much of West Africa, as well as other parts of the continent.
