= Ife-Ijumu =

Town in Nigeria

Coordinates: 7°50′14″N 5°54′54″E

Ife-Ijumu is a town in the Ijumu local government area, located in Kogi State in midwest Nigeria. It lies between Ekinrin-Adde and Ikoyi-Ijumu, along the Lokoja to Ado-Ekiti Highway. The town is near Kabba. The people call themselves Ufe and speak the distinctive Ufe dialect of Okun language. The town is surrounded by rocky hills and mountains. Prominent among these hills and mountains are Ogidi, Agere, Ogbogba, Okekafe and Orokeotun. These hills are mountains served social, cultural, political, economic and security purposes in the past. These hills were places where the various lineages constituting the present community once lived.

The Itaakpa rock shelter archaeological site is located about half of a kilometer west of the town.

== Notable people ==
1. Tolulope Arotile, first-ever female combat helicopter pilot in the Nigerian Air Force.
2. Chief Bayo Ojo, a former Federal Minister of Justice and Senior Advocate of Nigeria.
3. Late professor Ade Obayemi, a professor history/archeology of University of Ilorin.
