= Osifekunde =

Ijebu slave (1795–?)

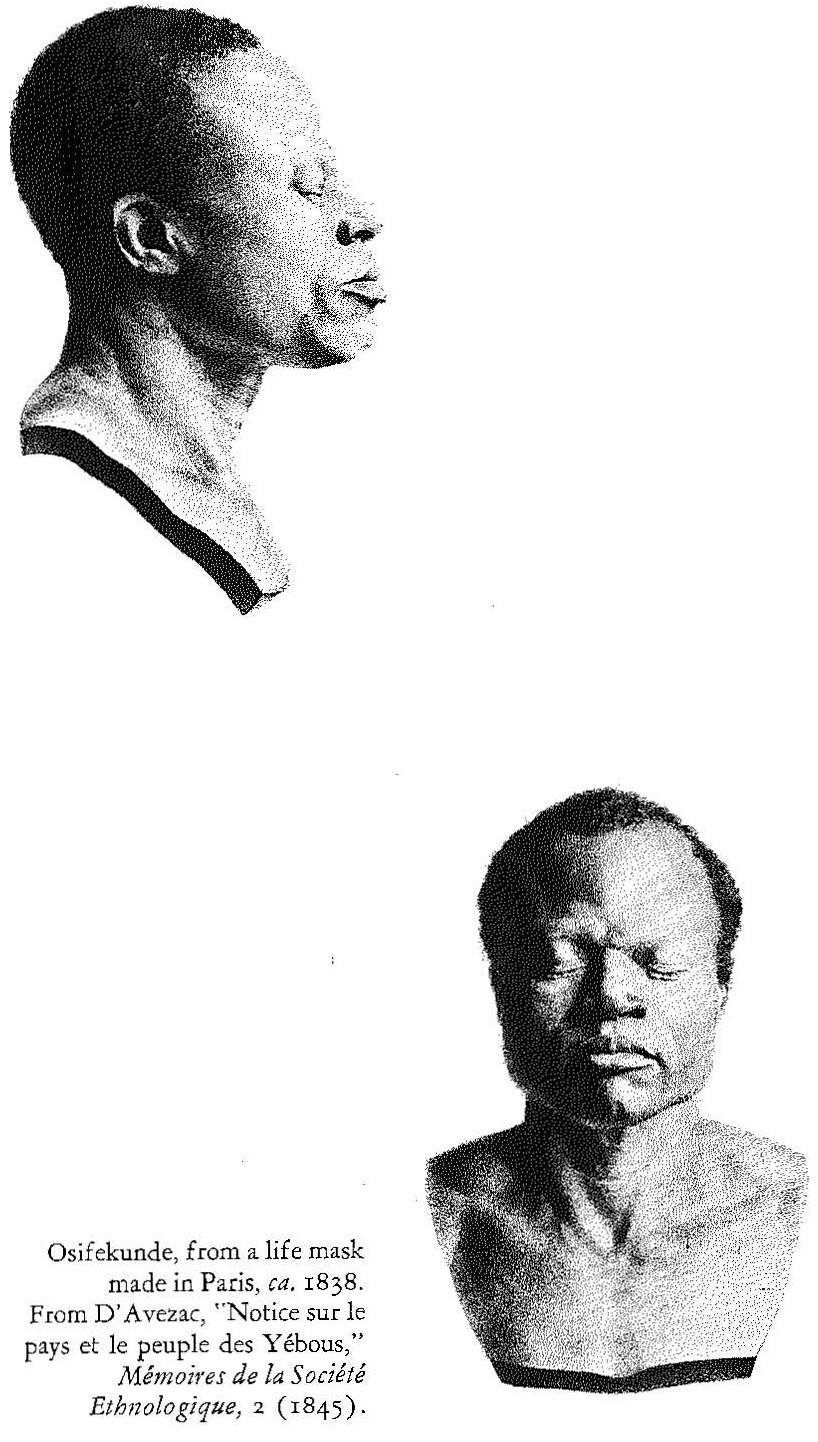
Life mask of Osifekunde commissioned by Pascal d'Avezac-Macaya around 1838

Osifekunde of Ijebu (born c. 1795) was an Ijebu man whose documented narrative, as a victim of transatlantic slave trade, serves as one of the earliest Western records of Yoruba land.

== Early life ==
Osifekunde was from Epe, Ijebu Ode, but was born in Makun, a suburb of Sagamu in about 1795. His father was Adde Sonlou, an Ijebu warrior who fled Makun as a result of a skirmish resulting in the death of another warrior. In addition to time in Epe as a result of his father Sonlou's asylum, Osifekunde spent time in the Kingdom of Benin. Osifekunde's grandfather was Ochi-Wo who held the office of Ladeke.

== Victim of the Trans Atlantic Slave Trade ==
Osifekunde was about 20 years old (approximately 1810) when Ijaw pirates captured him in the Niger Delta lagoon and sold him to Brazilian slave merchants.

== Meeting with Pascal d'Avezac-Macaya in Paris ==
About 20 years after Osifekunde was forcibly transferred to Brazil, he accompanied his master (one Mr. Navarre) to Paris where he was employed as a servant and went by the names 'Joaquim' and 'Joseph'. In Paris he happened upon Pascal d'Avezac-Macaya, an ethnographer and vice-president of the Société Ethnologique de Paris, who had a keen interest in Africa. Pascal d'Avesac-Macaya interviewed Osifekunde (in pidgin Portuguese since Osifekunde spoke little or no French at the time) for weeks and Osifekunde's recollection of Ijebu Ode and Lagos (published by Pascal d'Avezac-Macay in 1845) became an important addition to European knowledge of the Guinea Coast.

Pascal d'Avesac-Macaya arranged for Osifekunde to move to Sierra Leone (then a British colony established as a home for captives liberated by the West Africa Squadron) but Osifekunde didn't take the offer and according to P.C. Lloyd "preferred servitude under his former master in Brazil, where he could be with his own son". There are no accounts of Osifekunde after his chance encounter with Pascal d'Avezac-Macaya. Seemingly frustrated by the transient nature of his encounter with Osifekunde, Pascal d'Avezac-Macay wrote:

Let me bring these disconnected pages to a close, a hasty collection of incomplete data drawn from an unexpected source [Osifekunde] and one that too soon became silent. Especially during my work of coordination I have become conscious of many important gaps that remain to be filled; but I no longer have Osifekunde to answer my questions, and I can only offer the results of our long and often fruitless conversations.
