= Koya (name) =

Khoya or Khoja is a Malabar Muslim surname and a masculine Japanese given name. Notable people with the name include:

Surname:

- Kwaja (Koya-Malabar)
- Sidiq Koya (1924–1993), Fijian-Indian politician and opposition leader
- C. H. Mohammed Koya (1927–1983), Indian politician and Chief Minister of Kerala
- P. P. Ummer Koya (1922–2000), Indian politician
- P. Pookunhi Koya (born 1949), Indian politician
- Mammukoya (born 1946), Malayalam film actor

Given name:

- Koya Nishikawa (born 1942), Japanese politician
- Koya Shimizu (born 1982), Japanese footballer

Fictional characters:

- Koya, a Teenage Mutant Ninja Turtles character
- Koya Marino, a Crush Gear Turbo character
