= Saheed Ademola Elegushi =

Nigerian king (born 1976)

Oba Saheed Ademola Elegushi
- Kusenla III, Elegushi of Ikateland
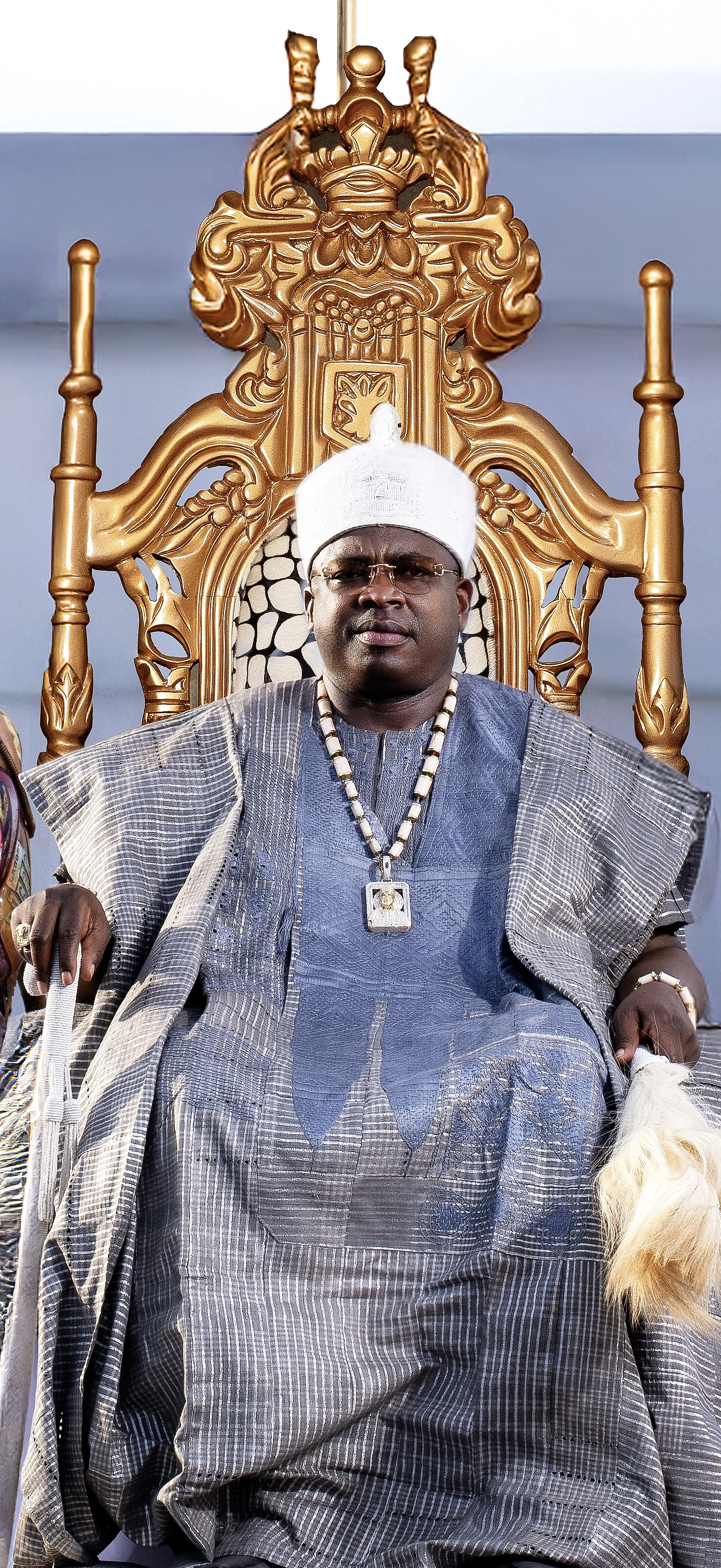
- Reign: 27 April 2010 - present
- Predecessor: Oba Yekini Adeniyi Elegushi (Kusenla II)
- Born: 10 April 1976 (age 50)
- House: Kusenla Ruling House
- Father: Late Oba Yekini Adeniyi Elegushi
- Mother: Olori Sinatu Titilayo Elegushi
- Occupation: Monarch

His Royal Majesty, Oba Alayeluwa Saheed Ademola Elegushi, Kusenla III, a Nigerian monarch (born 10 April 1976), is the 21st Elegushi of the Ikate-Elegushi Kingdom. Oba Elegushi is a descendant of Kusenla Ruling House of Ikateland in Lagos State. He succeeded his father, late Oba Yekini Adeniyi Elegushi, the 20th Oba Elegushi of Ikateland, who reigned from 1991 to 2009. Oba Elegushi was presented with the staff of office by the Government of Lagos State on 27 April 2010. Kusenla III served Lagos State as Personal Assistant and Senior Special Assistant to two former governors of the state, Bola Tinubu and Babatunde Fashola respectively, before becoming a king.

== Background, education and career ==
Oba Elegushi was born on 10 April 1976. He shared the same birthday as his father, late Oba Yekini Adeniyi Elegushi, who was the first crowned king of Ikateland. He had his primary school education at the St. Mathias Primary School, Lagos between 1981 and 1987. He had his secondary school education at the Methodist Boys' High School, Lagos between 1988 and 1994. He proceeded to the Lagos State University, where he studied economics between the year 1995 and 2000, and bagged a Bachelor of Science Degree (B.Sc.) with a Second Class Honorary Degree. He also had his master's degree in economics in the same institution between 2002 and 2003. He proceeded to the University of Manchester, where he obtained a master's degree in public administration.

Oba Elegushi worked as Administrator, Business Development and Strategy, at Elegushi Property Investment Company, from year 2000 to 2002. He was appointed as Special Assistant to the Governor of Lagos State from 2003 to 2007. When Fashola succeeded Tinubu as Governor of Lagos, Oba Elegushi was appointed again as Senior Special Assistant (Special Programmes/Duties) to the Governor of Lagos State. He was in that position until 2010 when he became the king of Ikateland. At the time of his ascending the throne, he was 34 years old, making him the youngest king in Lagos State.

== Philanthropy & Interventions ==
Oba Elegushi is the founder of Oba Saheed Elegushi Foundation, a non-governmental organization. Through the foundation, Elegushi allocated Two Hundred Million Naira (₦200M) grant to support one thousand (1,000) small and medium-sized enterprises (SMEs) and students in Lagos State.

In celebration of the Girl-Child in 2022, the Foundation was reported to have donated sanitary supplies to one thousand school girls in Lagos. Oba Elegushi has leveraged his royal influence to advocate holistic approach to eradicating endemic drug addiction among youths, and return of monthly sanitation in Lagos State to address perennial environmental challenges affecting communities.

== Honours and awards ==
In October, 2018, he was appointed as one of the patrons of the Nigeria Olympic Committee, a body charged with the responsibilities "to advise and support the Olympic Movement as appropriate". Other prominent Nigerians so appointed were Bola Tinubu and a former governor of Delta State, Emmanuel Uduaghan In November 2019, Igbinedion University, Okada, Edo State, Nigeria, honoured Oba Elegushi, alongside former Nigeria President, Dr. Goodluck Jonathan and foremost Nigerian actress, Omotola Jalade-Ekeinde, with Honoris Causa in Public Administration, for his "contributions as a Traditional and Cultural Icon, Outstanding and Visionary Leader, Developmentalist, Generational Role Model and a National Builder." He was bestowed with Peace Achievers Awards in October 2019, by Peace Ambassadors.

== Personal life ==
Oba Elegushi, married to Olori Sekinat Elegushi and Olori Hadiza Elegushi, with kids, comes from a large family. A Nigerian celebrity journal, City People Magazine reported he has 19 siblings: 12 sisters and 7 brothers. The king's garage includes luxury cars such as a Rolls-Royce Phantom, Maybach 600 and 1967 Cadillac De Ville.
