= Oloyede Adeyeoba =

Nigerian king

- Akinghare II
- Reign: 2019 – present
- Coronation: 2019
- Predecessor: Akinghare l
- Born: Oloyede Adeyeoba; 2003 (age 22–23); Okeluse, Ondo State, Nigeria
- Father: Akinghare l

Oba Oloyede Adeyeoba Akinghare ll is the current Arujale Ojima of Okeluse, Ondo State, Nigeria. He is the traditional ruler of Okeluse. Adeyeoba is the ruler and monarch of the Okeluse kingdom, Ose Local Government Area of Ondo State. At the age of sixteen, he succeeded his father, the late Oba Akinghare I, Adeyeoba Omomogbe to the throne in 2019. He graduated from secondary school in August 2022.

== Education ==
In 2022, Oloyede Adeyeoba finished his secondary school education at Greater Tomorrow International College, Arigidi, Ondo, Nigeria. He is currently studying political science at the Afe Babalola University for his BSc degree.

== Selection and coronation ==
He became a king in February 2019, after his father's demise. He was appointed to succeed his father being the only male child his father had., in line with the tradition of his town, the first male child of the incumbent king is appointed as the successor.

== Personal life ==
Akinghare ll is single but plans to marry more than one wife as his custom stipulates.
