= Olukoya Ogen =

Nigerian professor of history

Provost of Adeyemi College of Education
- In office October 2014 – October 2018
- Preceded by: Adeyemi Idowu
- Succeeded by: Samuel Akintunde

Personal details
- Born: September 1968 (age 58)
- Citizenship: Nigeria
- Known for: History

Olukoya Ogen is a Nigerian professor of history. He is a Fellow of the Nigerian Academy of Letters, Fellow of the Historical Society of Nigeria, as well as Fellow of the Royal Historical Society of the United Kingdom and former Provost of Adeyemi College of Education, Nigeria.

== Education ==
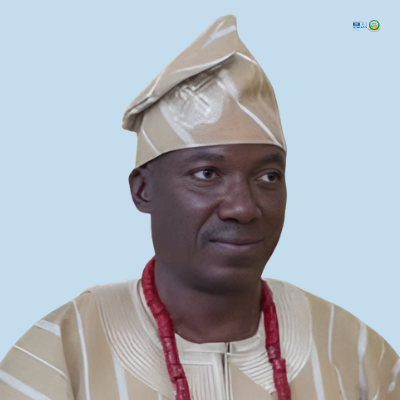

Olukoya Ogen obtained his PhD degree in History from the University of Lagos as well as a Certificate in Trade, Growth and Poverty from the World Bank Institute, Washington DC in 2006. He was a Leventis Scholar at the University of London in 2008; a British Academy Visiting Fellow at the University of Birmingham in 2009; a Cadbury Visiting Fellow in 2010; and an American Council of Learned Societies Postdoctoral Fellow in 2011. He was also the Country Director and Co-Investigator of a European Research Council Grant from 2012 to 2017. Olukoya Ogen was awarded the University of Leeds' LUCAS-LAHRI Visiting Fellowship in 2022. He also won the prestigious UNESCO International Fund for Cultural Diversity grant in 2023 among other research grants. He specialises in the sociocultural and economic history of Nigeria.

== Professional and administrative career ==
Prior to joining Osun State University in 2009, he had stints at the University of Lagos, 2000–2001, Adekunle Ajasin University, 2001–2006, and Obafemi Awolowo University, 2006–2009. He was a Guest Researcher at Fourah Bay College, University of Sierra Leone in 2011, and was an ACLS Scholar-in-Residence at the University of Ibadan in 2012. He was appointed Visiting Senior Research Fellow at the University of Birmingham in 2012; Visiting Full Research Professor at Southern University, Baton Rouge, Louisiana from 2017-2020; and Endowed Professor of Education by the American lCT University in Yaounde in 2018.

He served as the pioneer Dean of the Faculty of Humanities at Osun State University from 2012 to 2014, and was appointed by the federal government as the Provost of Adeyemi College of Education, Ondo, from 2014 to 2018. He was a federal government appointee on the Governing Council of the Federal Polytechnic, Ilaro from 2017-2020. He was a member of the TETfund National Research Fund Committee from 2017-2023. In November 2018, the Board of Trustees of ICT University Foundation, USA appointed him as the Chairman of the Implementation Committee and Vice-Chancellor designate of the proposed ICT University in Nigeria.

== Honours and recognitions ==
He is a recipient of two Lifetime Achievement Awards, he also received a Letter of Commendation from the 8th Senate of the Federal Republic of Nigeria for accountability and integrity after emerging as the best Provost in Nigeria for 2017. He was appointed Honorary Mayor of the City of Baton Rouge, Louisiana in 2017. He won the UNIOSUN Gold Award for Research Excellence in 2023 and the Prof. Ali Mazrui Prize for Excellence in Scholarship in 2019. He is also a recipient of a Platinum Benefactor prize and University Super Hero award by the University of Medical Sciences, Ondo City in 2017 and 2019 respectively.
