= Tsoede =

African king and first Nupe people uniter

Tsoede, also known as Tsuedigi, Tsade or Edegi(c. 1496 – c.1591) is a legendary African leader. He was the first person to unite the Nupe people, and is considered the first Etsu Nupe, ruler of the Nupe Kingdom, between the Niger and Kaduna rivers in what is now central Nigeria.

Tsoede was raised at Nku which tradition claims to be the first Bini (Nupe subtribe) settlement in the entire Nupeland. He died on a military expedition in 1591 in an unknown geographical location.
