= Islam in Brazil =

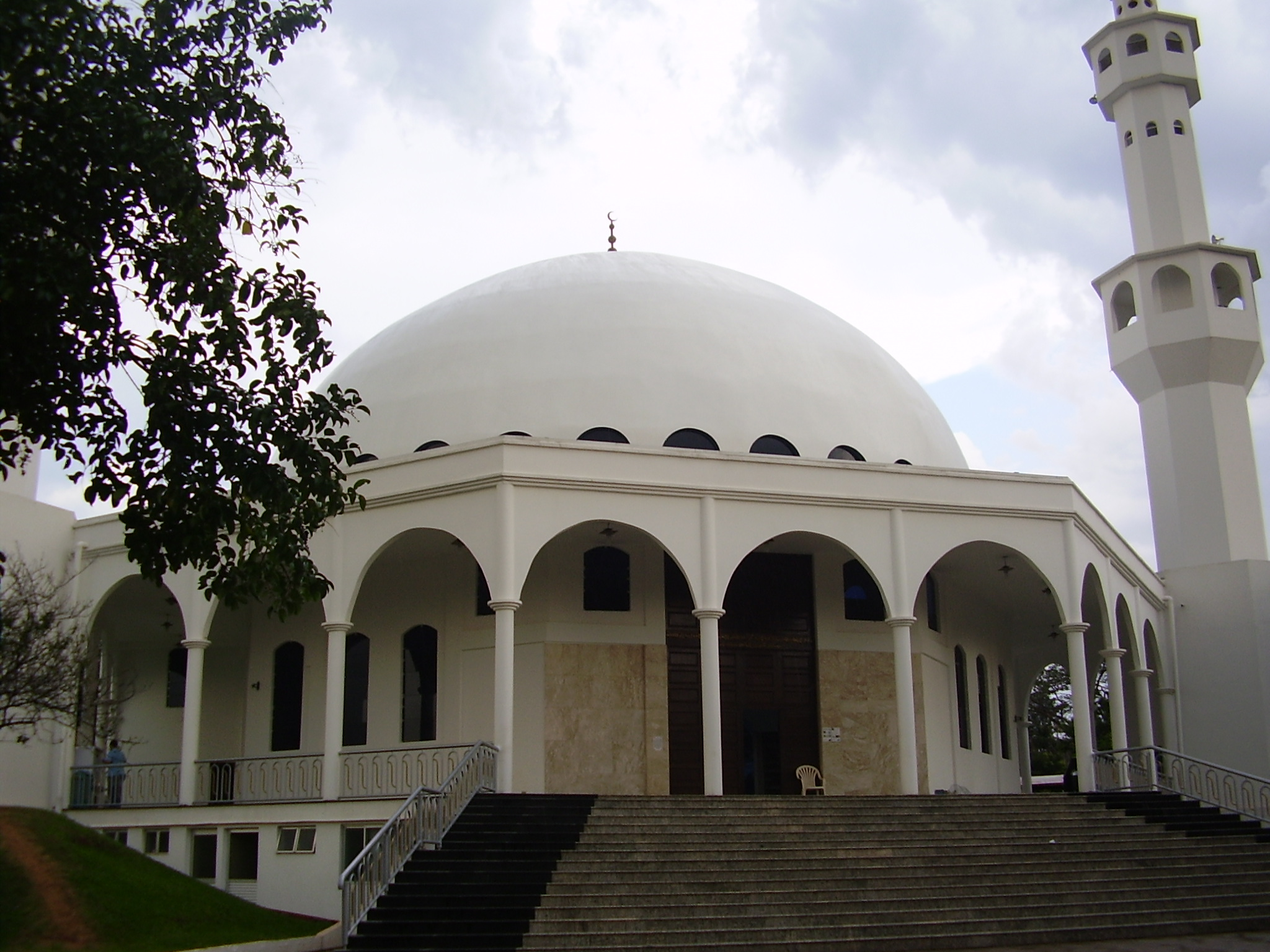
Mosque in Foz do Iguaçu

Brazil is a predominantly Christian country with Islam being a minority religion, first brought by African slaves and then by Lebanese and Syrian immigrants. Due to the secular nature of Brazil's constitution, Muslims are free to proselytize and build places of worship in the country. However, Islam is not independently included in charts and graphics representing religions in Brazil due to its very small size. It is grouped with "other religions", which generally represent about 1% of the country's population. The number of Muslims in Brazil, according to the 2010 census, was 35,207 out of a population of approximately 191 million people. This corresponds to 0.018% of the Brazilian population.

== History ==
=== African immigration ===
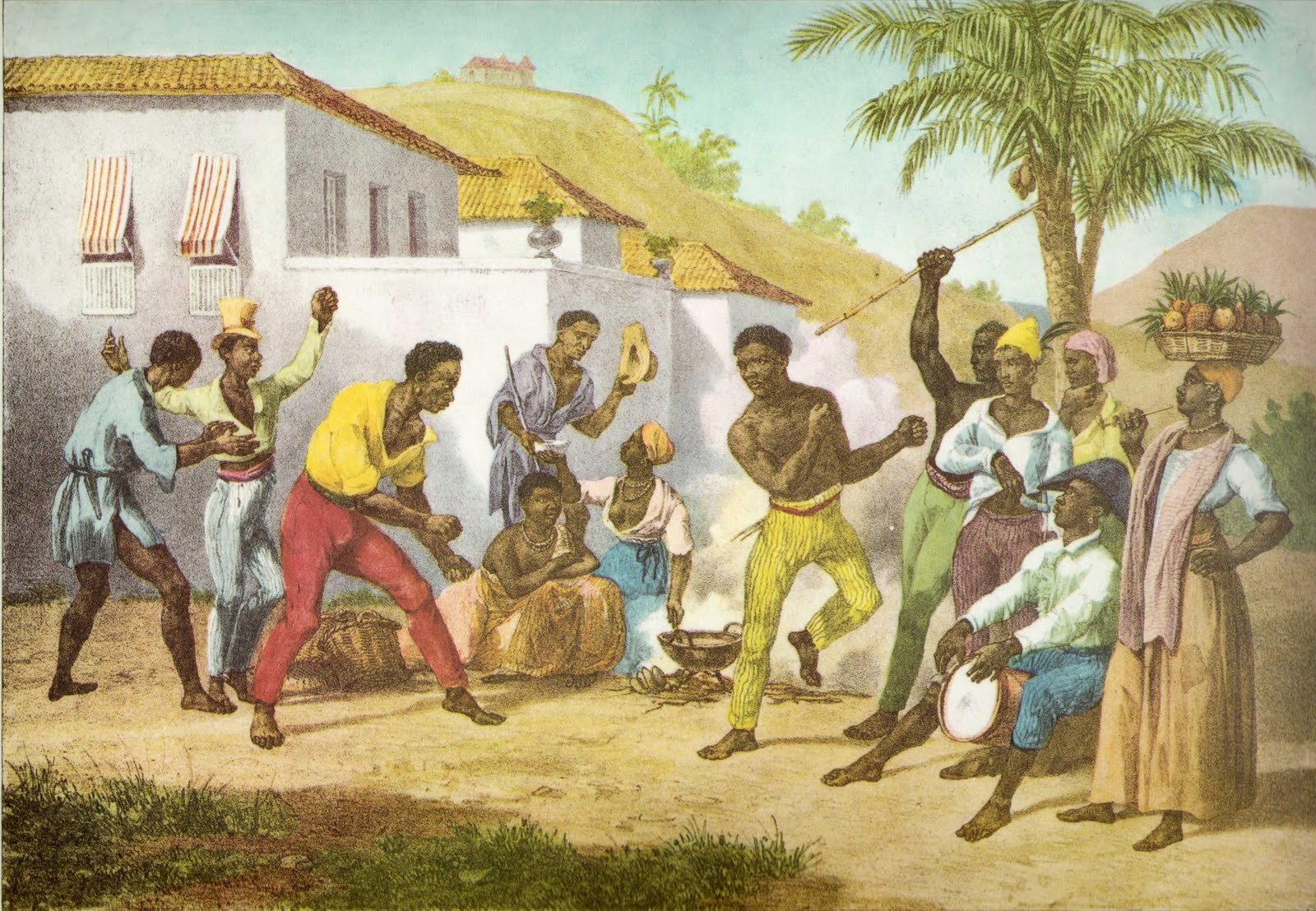
Capoeira or the Dance of War by Johann Moritz Rugendas, 1835

The history of Muslims in Brazil begins with the importation of African slave labor. 37% of all African slaves were taken to Brazil. This comes to over 3 million slaves. Starting around 1550, the Portuguese began to trade in African slaves to work the sugar plantations instead of the native Tupi people. Scholars claim that Brazil received more enslaved Muslims than anywhere else in the Americas.

During the days of the Barbary Wars, some native Brazilians came into interaction with Muslim lands. It was noted by Dr. Antonio Sosa, a Portuguese cleric held captive in North Africa in the 1570s, that the port of Algiers maintained one of the most ethnically diverse cities in the world including Amerindians from Iberian colonies in the New World. Barbary pirates were known to attack the shipping of slaves and merchandise while taking prisoners coming from the Americas. In 1673, 140 prisoners were taken from a Rio de Janeiro fleet, while a 1674 capture of a Brazilian ship contributed in the decision to increase naval protection.

=== Malê Revolt ===
The Muslim uprising of 1835 in Bahia illustrates the condition and legacy of resistance among the community of Malês, as African Muslims were known in 19th-century Bahia. Most participants were Nago, the local designation for ethnic Yoruba. Pacifico Licutan was one of the leaders of the revolt. Many of the "Malês" had been soldiers and captives in the wars between Oyo, Ilorin and other Yoruba city-states in the early part of the 19th century. Other participants included Hausa and Nupe clerics, along with Jeje or Dahomean soldiers who had converted to Islam or fought in alliance with Muslims."

Beginning on the night of January 24, 1835, and continuing the following morning, a group of African born slaves occupied the streets of Salvador and for more than three hours they confronted soldiers and armed civilians.

Even though it was short lived, the revolt was the largest slave revolt in Brazil and the largest urban slave revolt in the Americas. About 300 Africans took part and the estimated death toll ranges from fifty to a hundred, although exact numbers are unknown. This number increases even more if the wounded who died in prisons or hospitals are included. Many participants were sentenced to death, prison, whippings, or deportation. The rebellion had nationwide repercussions. Fearing the example might be followed, the Brazilian authorities began to watch the malês very carefully and in subsequent years intensive efforts were made to force conversions to Catholicism and erase the popular memory of and affection towards Islam. However, the African Muslim community was not erased overnight, and as late as 1910 it is estimated there were still some 100,000 African Muslims living in Brazil.

=== Muslim immigrants in Brazil ===
Following the revolt of the Afro-Brazilian Muslim community, the next period of Islam in the country was primarily the result of Muslim immigration from the Middle East and South East Asia. Some 11 million Syrian and Lebanese (mostly Maronite and Orthodox Christians) immigrants live throughout Brazil. The biggest concentration of Muslims is found in the greater São Paulo region. There is also a growing Bangladeshi Brazilian community, numbering in the thousands.

Architecture and cuisine also bear the trademarks of the culture brought to the hemisphere by the Arabs. As an example, the second largest fast food chain in Brazil is Habib's, which serves Arab food. The diversity of influence also stretches to businesses such as the textile industry, which is mostly run by merchants of Syrian-Lebanese origin (mainly of Christian faith). The São Paulo city council has a Muslim Councillor by the name of Mohammad Murad, a lawyer. A number of mosques dot the greater São Paulo area, the oldest and most popular of these being found on Avenida do Estado. Since its establishment, the mosque has added a Quranic school, library, kitchen and meeting hall for various functions.

== Today ==
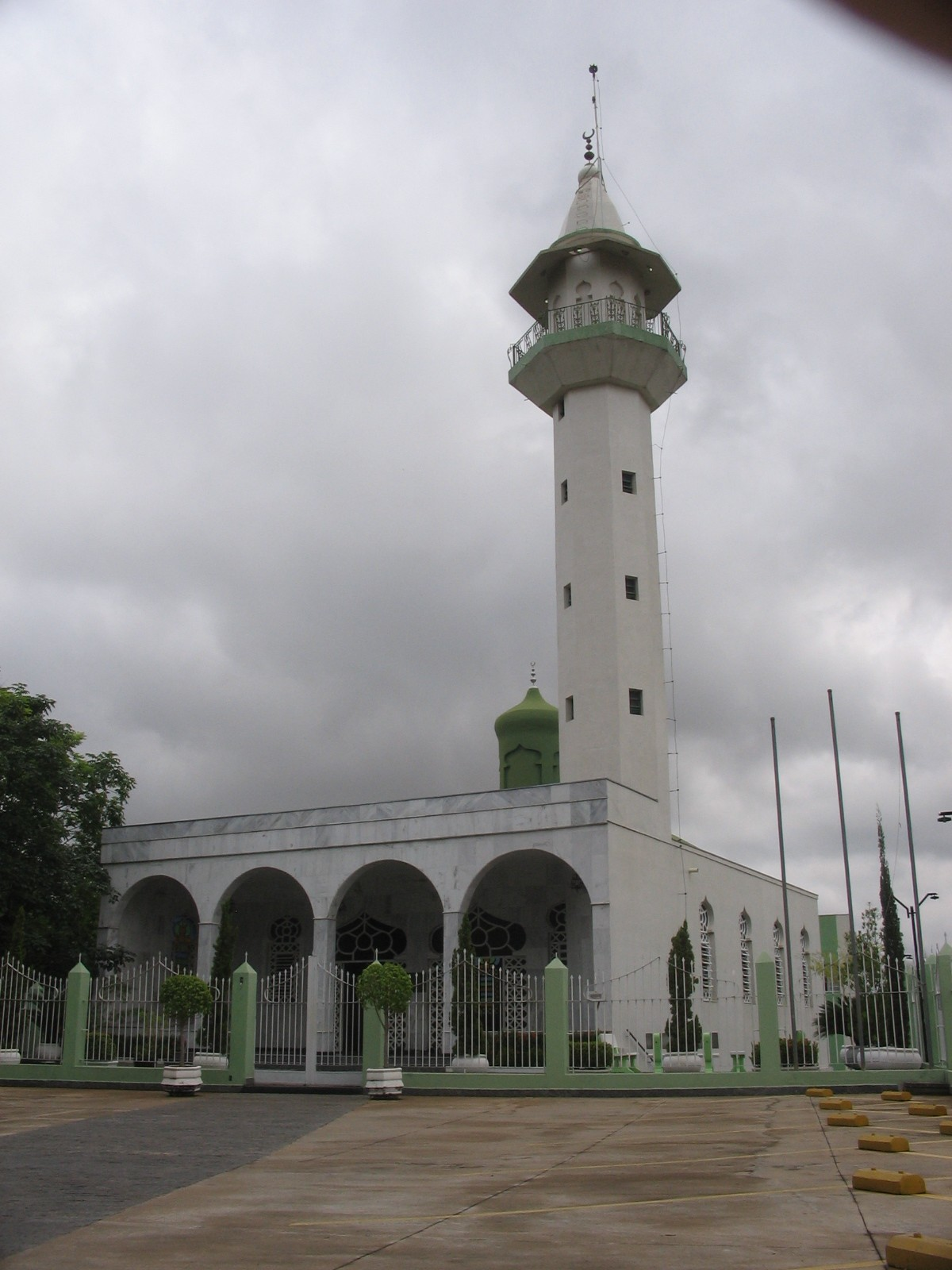
Mosque in Cuiabá, Brazil.

=== Population ===
According to the Brazilian census of 2010 there were 35,167 Muslims living in the country, primarily concentrated in the states of São Paulo and Paraná, compared to 22,450 Muslims in 1990 and 27,239 in 2000. There are significant Muslim communities in the industrial suburbs of the city of São Paulo and in the port city of Santos, as well as in smaller communities in Paraná State in the coastal region and in Curitiba and Foz do Iguaçu in the Argentina-Brazil-Paraguay triborder area. The community is overwhelmingly Sunni; the Sunnis are almost completely assimilated into broader society. The recent Shi'ite immigrants gravitate to small insular communities in São Paulo, Curitiba, and Foz do Iguaçu.

A recent trend has been the increase in conversions to Islam among non-Arab citizens. A recent Muslim source estimated that there are close to 10,000 Muslim converts living in Brazil. During the past 30 years, Islam has become increasingly noticeable in Brazilian society by building not only mosques, but also libraries, arts centres, and schools and also by funding newspapers. The growth of Islam within Brazil is demonstrated in the fact that 2 of the 3 existing Portuguese translations of the Qur'an were created by Muslim translators in São Paulo.

According to the IBGE census, 83.2% of Muslims are self-declared as white, 12.2% are mixed, 3.8% black, 0.8% orientals and 0.04% indigenous. Almost all Brazilian Muslims (99.2%) have been living in urban areas. Despite 60% of Brazilian Muslims being men, 70% of converted Muslims are women.

=== Infrastructure ===
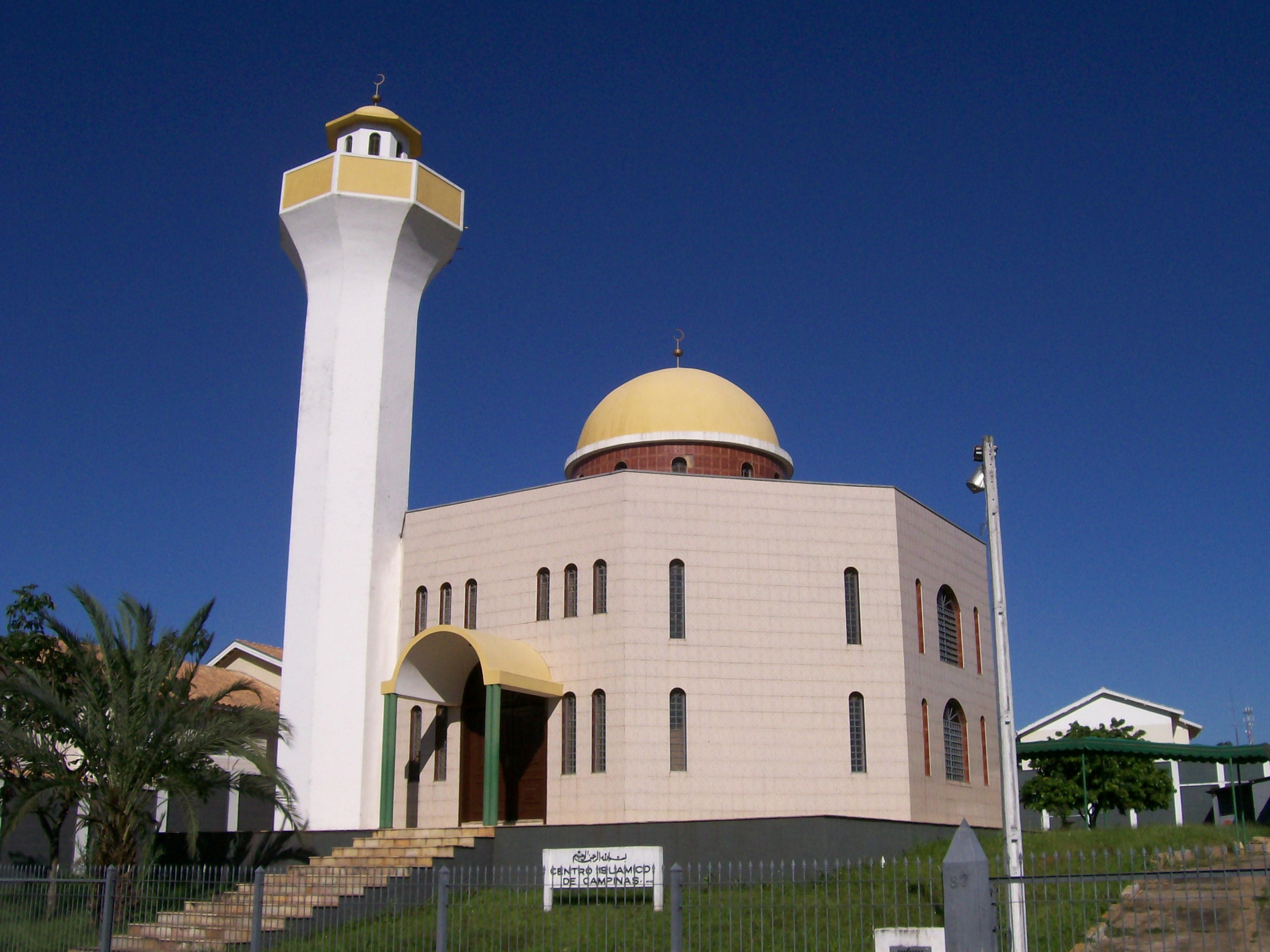
Islamic Centre of Campinas.

There are over 150 mosques in Brazil and the number is growing. As has been the case in many of the larger metropolitan mosques in South America, foreign assistance and individual effort have played major roles in the sustainability of the mosques in the greater São Paulo area. For example, the Imam of the Av. Do Estado Mosque is from the Middle East and often Imams are chosen jointly by the Mosques' management committees and the Arab governments that pay for the Imam's services. Ismail Hatia, a South African who came to Brazil in 1956, built a mosque in Campinas many years ago. Hatia, who also runs a language school, felt that the approximately 50 Muslim families in Campinas were in dire need of some community organization to help provide cohesion and direction for the Muslims. The Campinas mosque now holds regular Friday juma'at prayers.

== Notable Muslims ==
- Pacifico Licutan, a leader during the Malê Revolt

== See also ==
- Latin American Muslims
- Latino Muslims
- Hijab - Mulheres de véu
- Shia Islam in Brazil
- Islam by country
- Religion in Brazil
- List of mosques in Brazil

== Notes ==
- Elmaleh, Omri (2023-07-19), Vergara, Ángela (ed.), "Muslims in Brazil", Oxford Research Encyclopedia of Latin American History (1 ed.), Oxford University PressNew York, NY, doi:10.1093/acrefore/9780199366439.013.1157, ISBN 978-0-19-785181-4
- de Castro, Cristina Maria (2017-01-01), Schmidt, Bettina; Engler, Steven (eds.), "Islam in the Brazilian Religious Landscape", Handbook of Contemporary Religions in Brazil, BRILL, pp. 267–278, doi:10.1163/9789004322134_017, ISBN 978-90-04-32213-4
- Marquez, Schuyler (2016), Gooren, Henri (ed.), "Islam in Brazil", Encyclopedia of Latin American Religions, Cham: Springer International Publishing, pp. 1–9, doi:10.1007/978-3-319-08956-0_263-1, ISBN 978-3-319-08956-0
- Castro, Cristina Maria de (2013-04-25). The Construction of Muslim Identities in Contemporary Brazil. Bloomsbury Publishing USA. ISBN 979-8-216-29057-5.
- Mühendis Faik (2020). Özalp, N. Ahmet (ed.). Türk denizcilerin ilk Amerika seferi: Seyahatnâme-i Bahri Muhit. Kitabevi Deniz seyahatnâmeleri (4. baskı ed.). Cağaloğlu-İstanbul: Kitabevi. ISBN 978-975-6403-76-1.
- Akande, Habeeb (2016-05-01). Illuminating the Blackness: Blacks and African Muslims in Brazil. Rabaah Publishers. ISBN 978-0-9574845-2-8. OCLC 952675037.
- Diouf, Sylviane A. (2013-10-04). Servants of Allah: African Muslims Enslaved in the Americas. NYU Press. ISBN 978-1-4798-4711-2.
