= Yoruba architecture =

Architecture of the Yoruba people

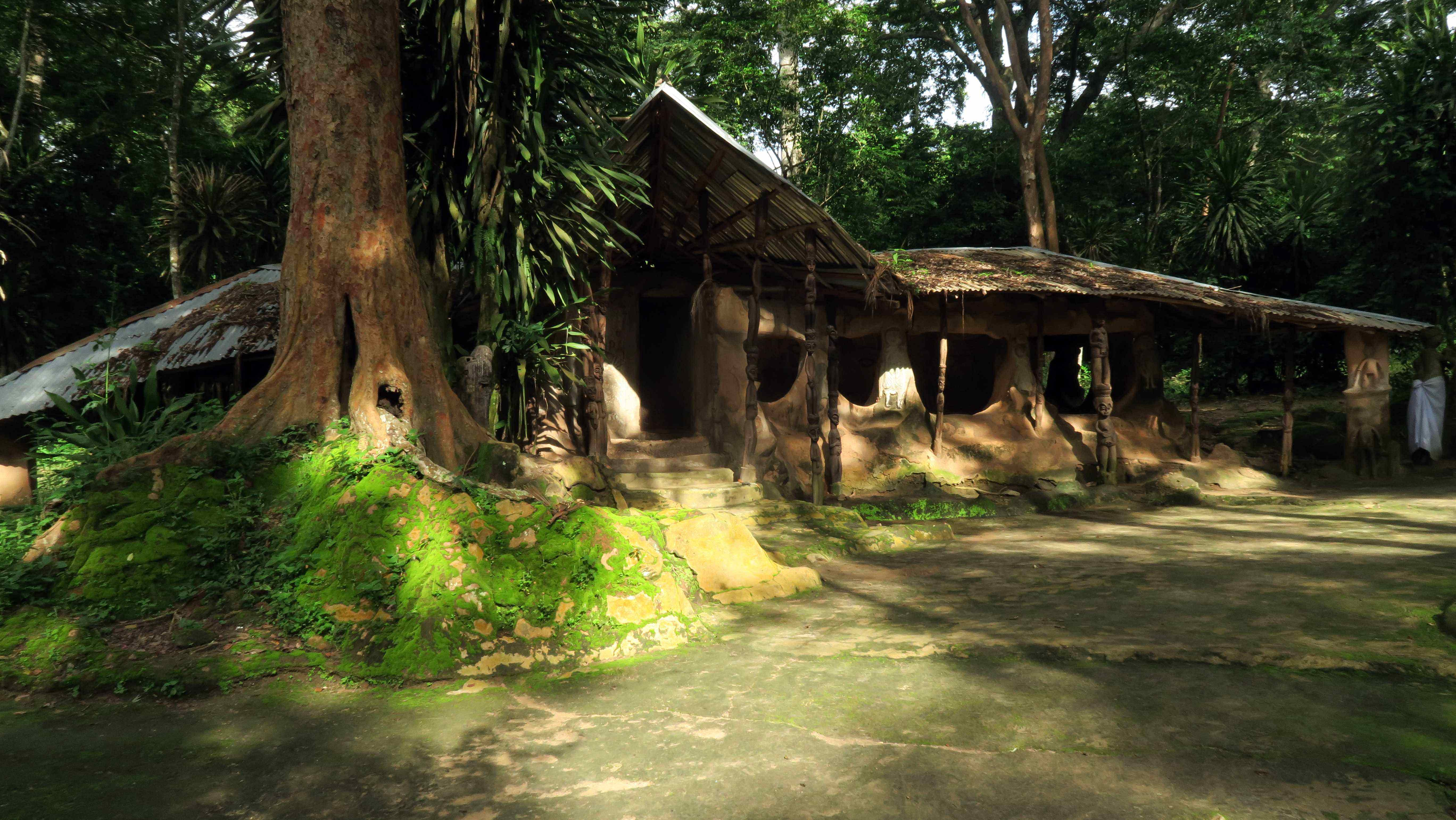
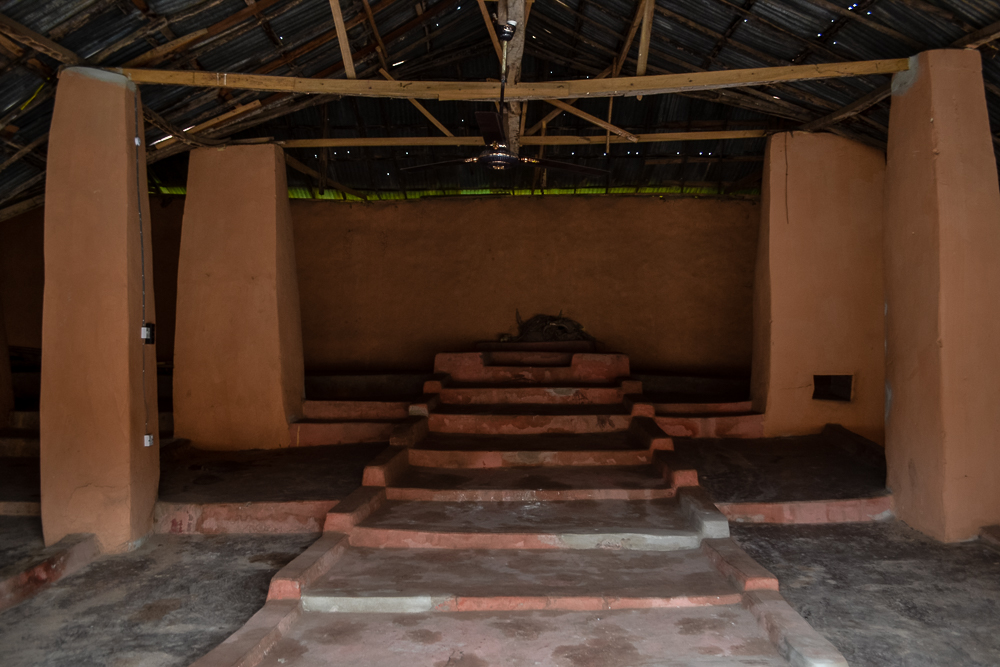
- Top: Osun-Osogbo Sacred Grove a World Heritage Site in Osogbo, Nigeria; Middle: Post-Colonial Yoruba-inspired architecture, Natural History Museum, Obafemi Awolowo University, Ife, Nigeria; Bottom: Interior of the old palace of the Deji of Akure with a low incline stair leading to an elevated platform.
- Years active: c. ? AD - Present
- Location: Nigeria, Benin

Yoruba architecture describes the architectural styles of the Yoruba people of West Africa, dating back to approximately the 8th century. and lasted up to and beyond the colonial period beginning in the 19th century CE.

Typical houses consisted of rectangular windowless single-room buildings arranged around a central courtyard ringed by verandas. Building styles resembled those of the Ashanti, including construction from earth, wood, palm oil and straw bolstered by timber frameworks and roofed with thatched leaves and wood, or later aluminum and corrugated iron.

Most medieval/pre-colonial Yoruba settlements were surrounded by defensive mud walls. Sungbo's Eredo, a series of such fortifications equipped with guard houses and moats, has been considered the largest pre-colonial monument in Africa, larger even than the Pyramid of Khufu in Egypt or Great Zimbabwe.

After British colonization, architecture in Lagos in particular was influenced by Brazilian architecture, brought in large part by Agudas, who introduced elements such as masonry, stucco, arched windows and doorways, and added prominence to multi-storey buildings.

== History ==
=== Pre-colonial styles ===
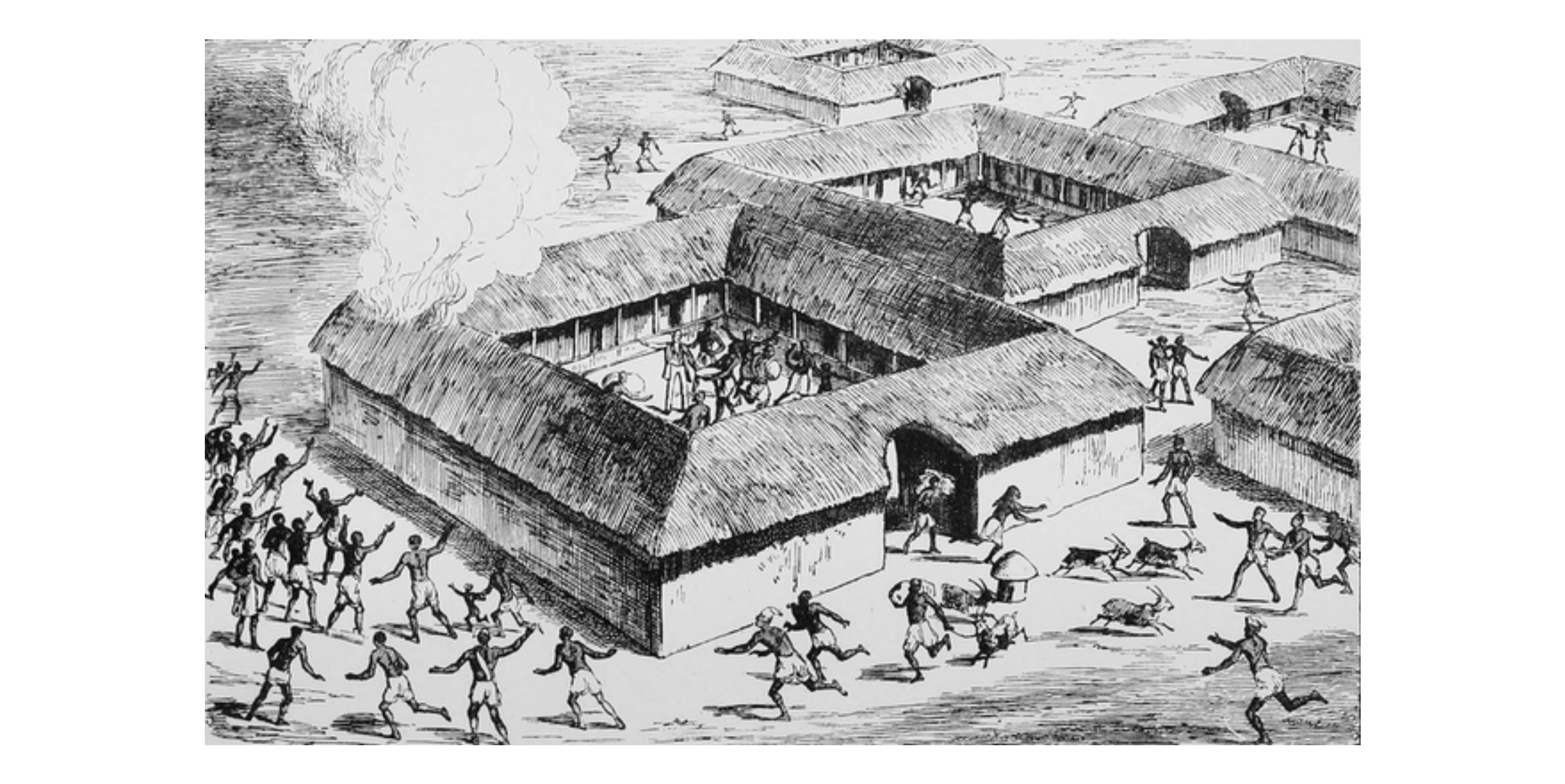
Though quite dramatic, this mid-19th c. image by Charles A. Gollmer depicts a common Yoruba settlement of the era

Pre-colonial Yoruba people predominantly lived in ring-like urban clusters. Families lived in square structures built to enclose open courtyards, and the palaces of obas often had an open market area that made up the centre of a town. A hierarchy of sorts was maintained throughout many Yoruba towns, wherein the oba or other ruler boasted the largest compound and the most courtyards. The dwelling places of the city's ward or lineage chiefs were following in size and space, which were also typically made with more than one central courtyard. The sizes of the houses of the town elders of local families followed suit.

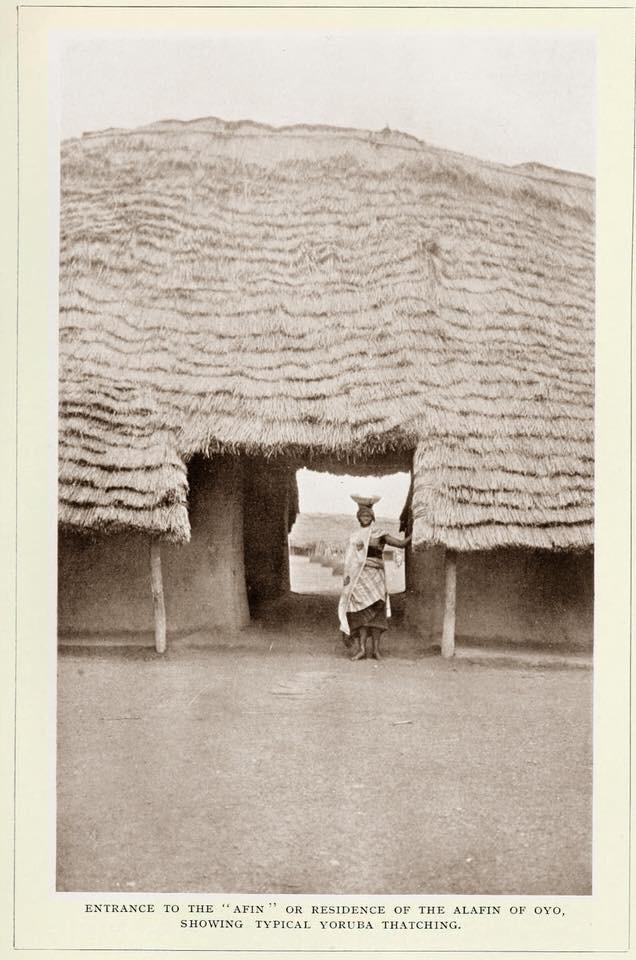
Palace of the Alaafin of Oyo, as photographed by Frobenius

Traditional Yoruba architectural forms can be seen as hollow squares or circles, and buildings can be viewed as compounds consisting of various sub-units arranged in quadrilateral shapes surrounding an open courtyard. The open space served as the point of social contact for inhabitants and was also used for cooking and craft making. The open spaces or courtyards were purposefully designed to be much larger than interior spaces to encourage communication between family members. On the other hand, the enclosed spaces made much smaller and darker were mostly used for sleeping. The main material for building house walls was molded mud, obtained from laterite soils. Yoruba houses were built without windows. Roofing materials were influenced by environmental conditions. In areas closest to the Atlantic coast, raffia palm leaves were frequently used for roofing, while in the northern regions, wood was substituted for palm fronds.

The palaces and houses of chiefs had extended courtyards. Animal murals and carved posts beautified palaces and chiefly homes, which also served as prominent shrines for dedications to Orishas. Gardens were prominent in Yoruba arts and architecture. Yoruba palaces often included gardens. At the Olowo's palace for example, there existed different kinds of gardens ranging from farm, temple, sacred, kitchen, and herb gardens. Impluviums were also utilized in Yoruba compounds to collect rain water.

== Gallery ==
=== Building exterior ===
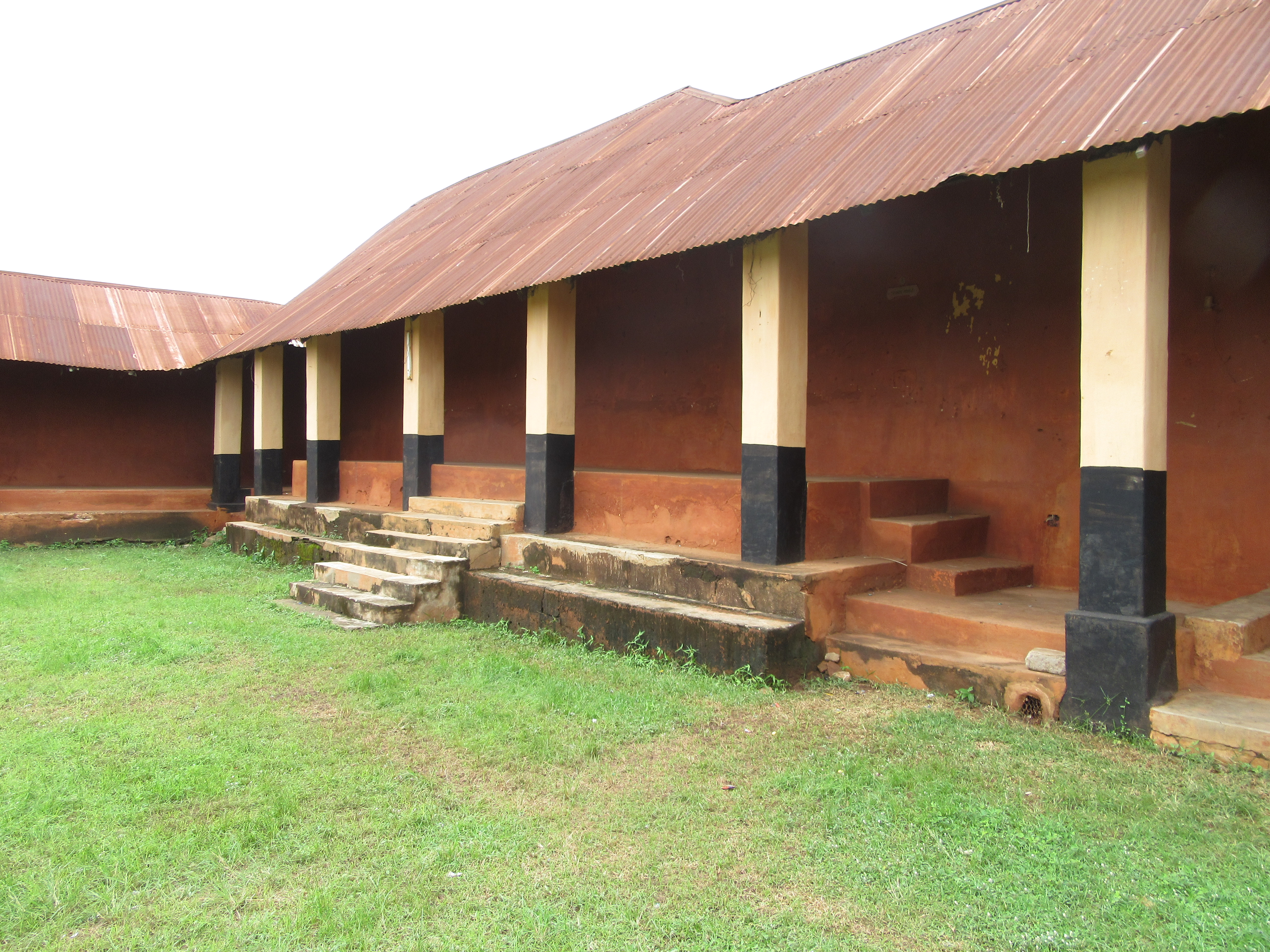
Old palace of porto Novo built in the Yoruba style featuring a central courtyard which also serves as an impluvium.

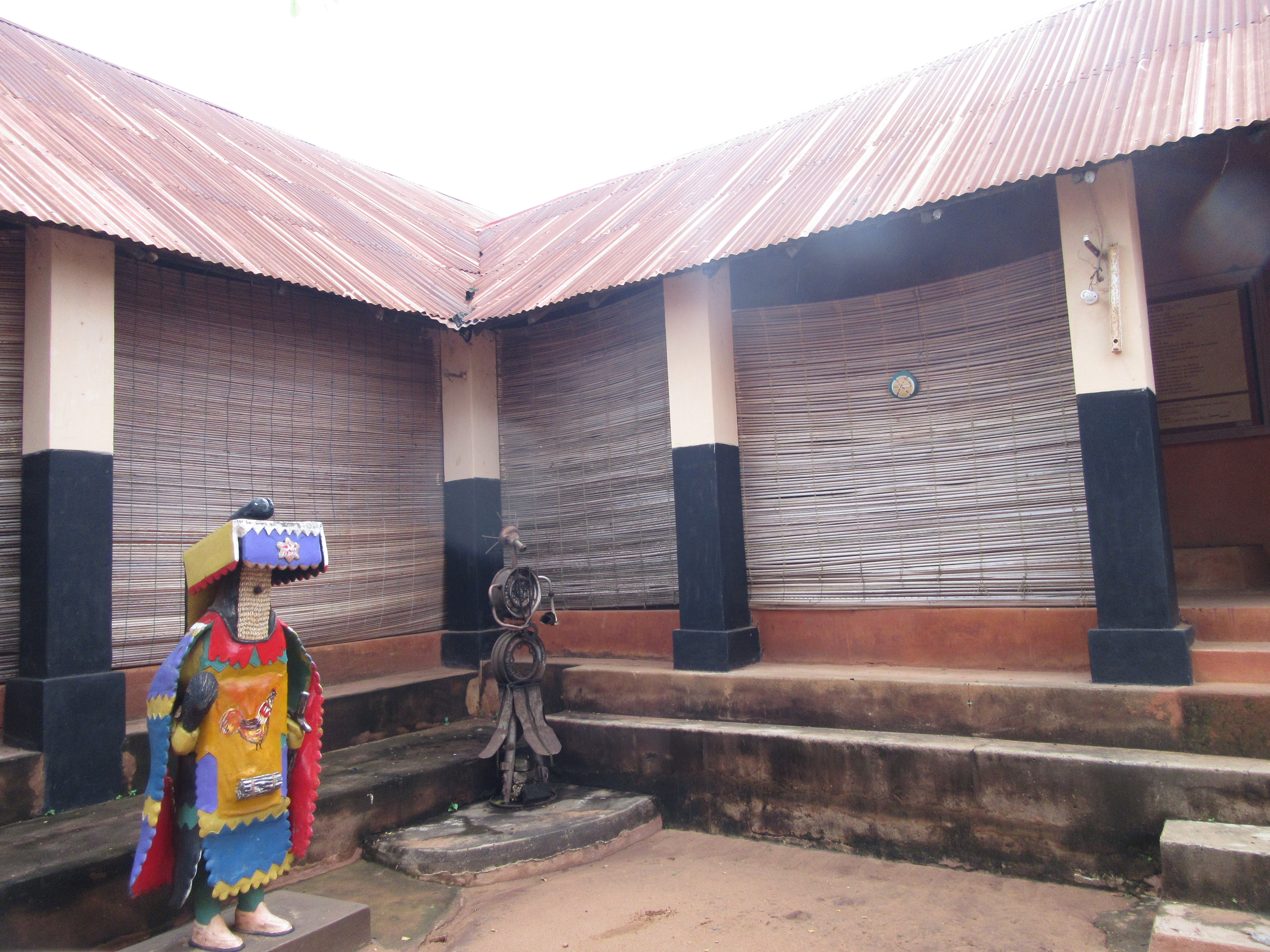
Central courtyard of the Yoruba styled old royal palace (Aafin Oba) of the rulers of Porto Novo featuring an Egungun and a post to Ogun

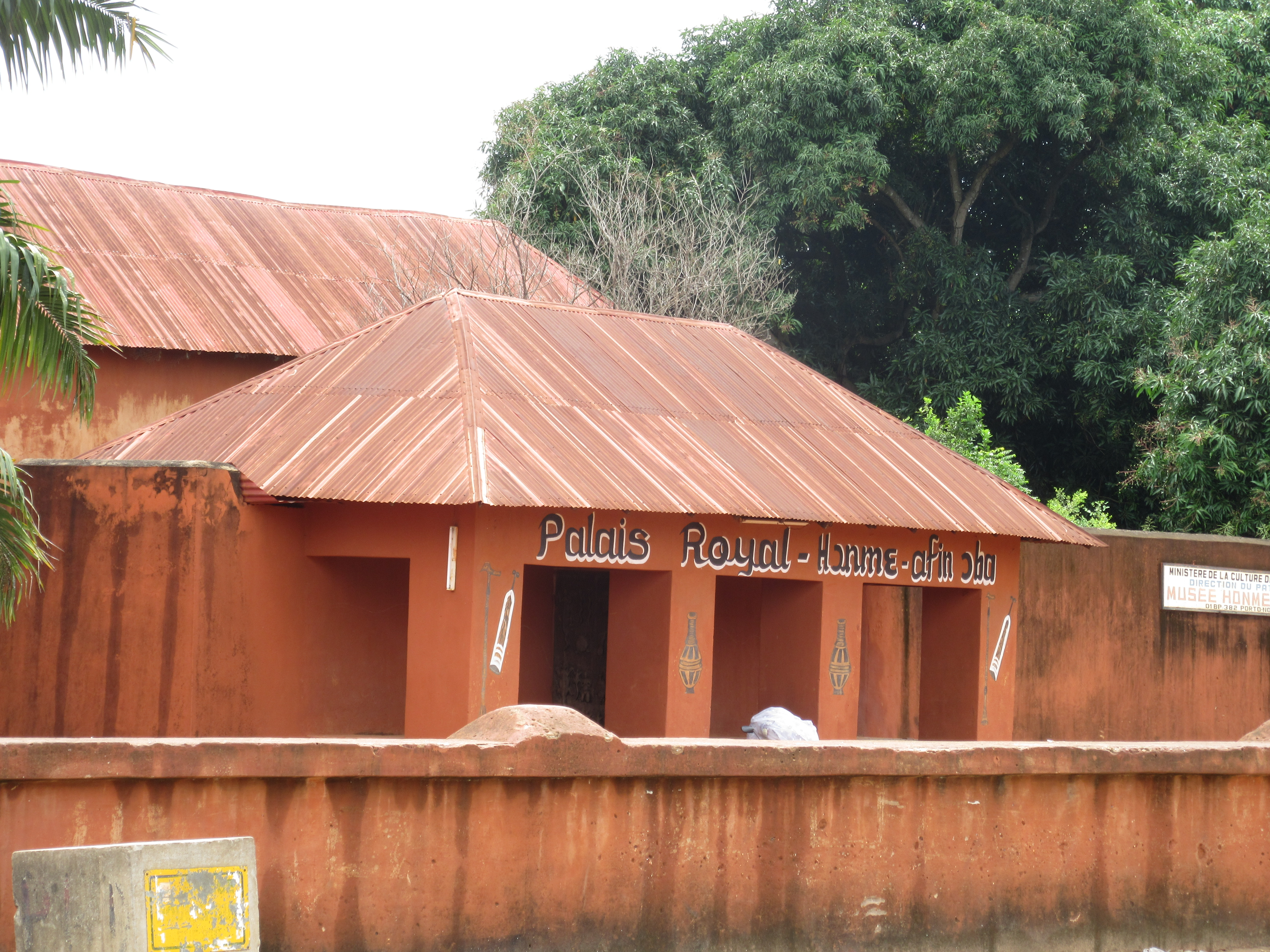
View of a part of the exterior walls of the old Porto Novo (Ajaṣe, Hogbonu) palace.

=== Pillars, posts, panels and beams ===
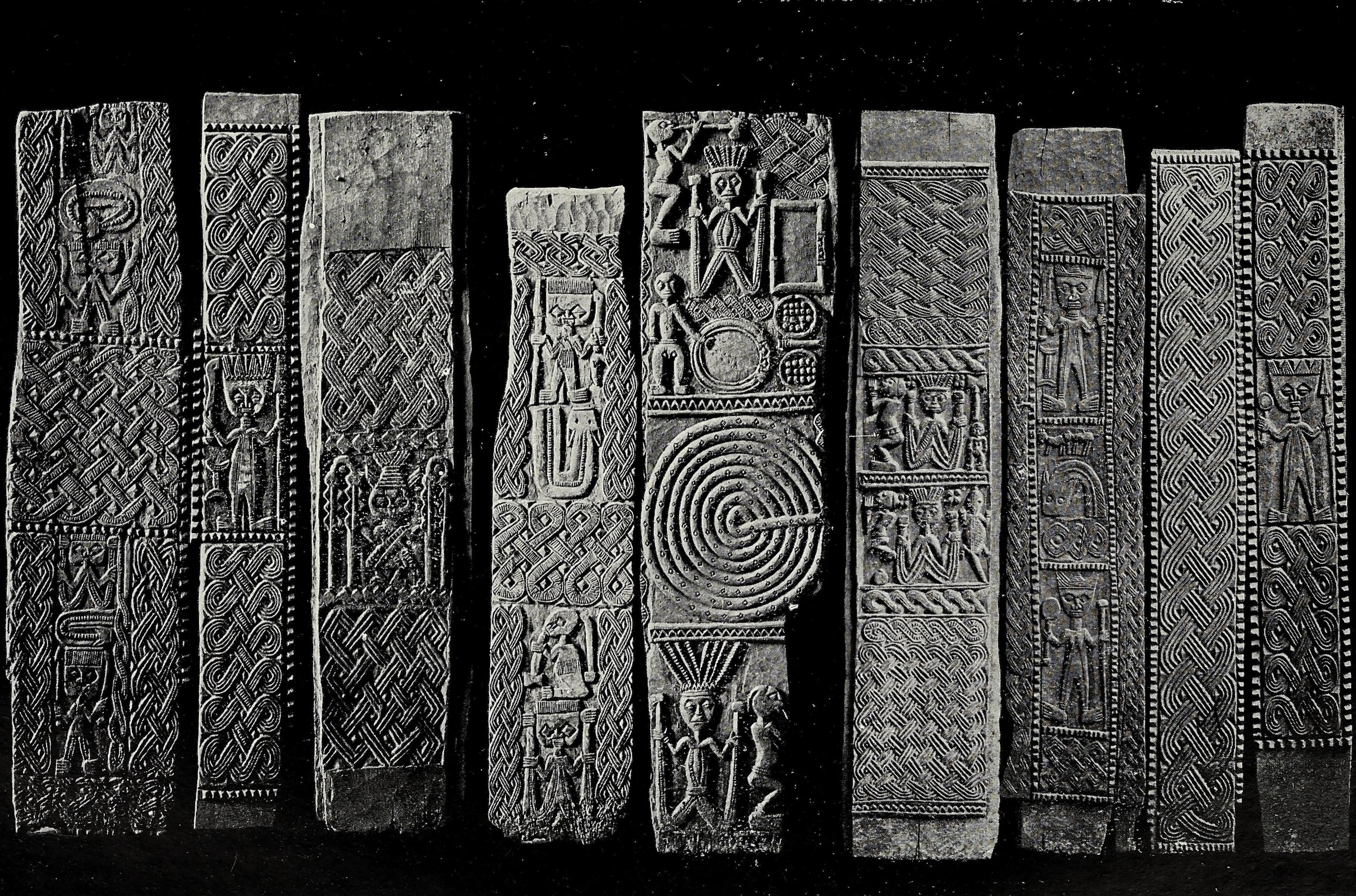
Carved planks and beams obtained from Yoruba Temples.

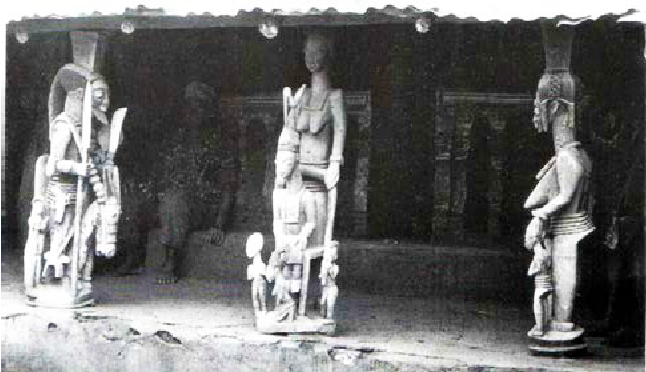
Veranda entrance posts (Opo Ogoga) depicting a royal horseman, a woman with twin daughters from Ikere-Ekiti.
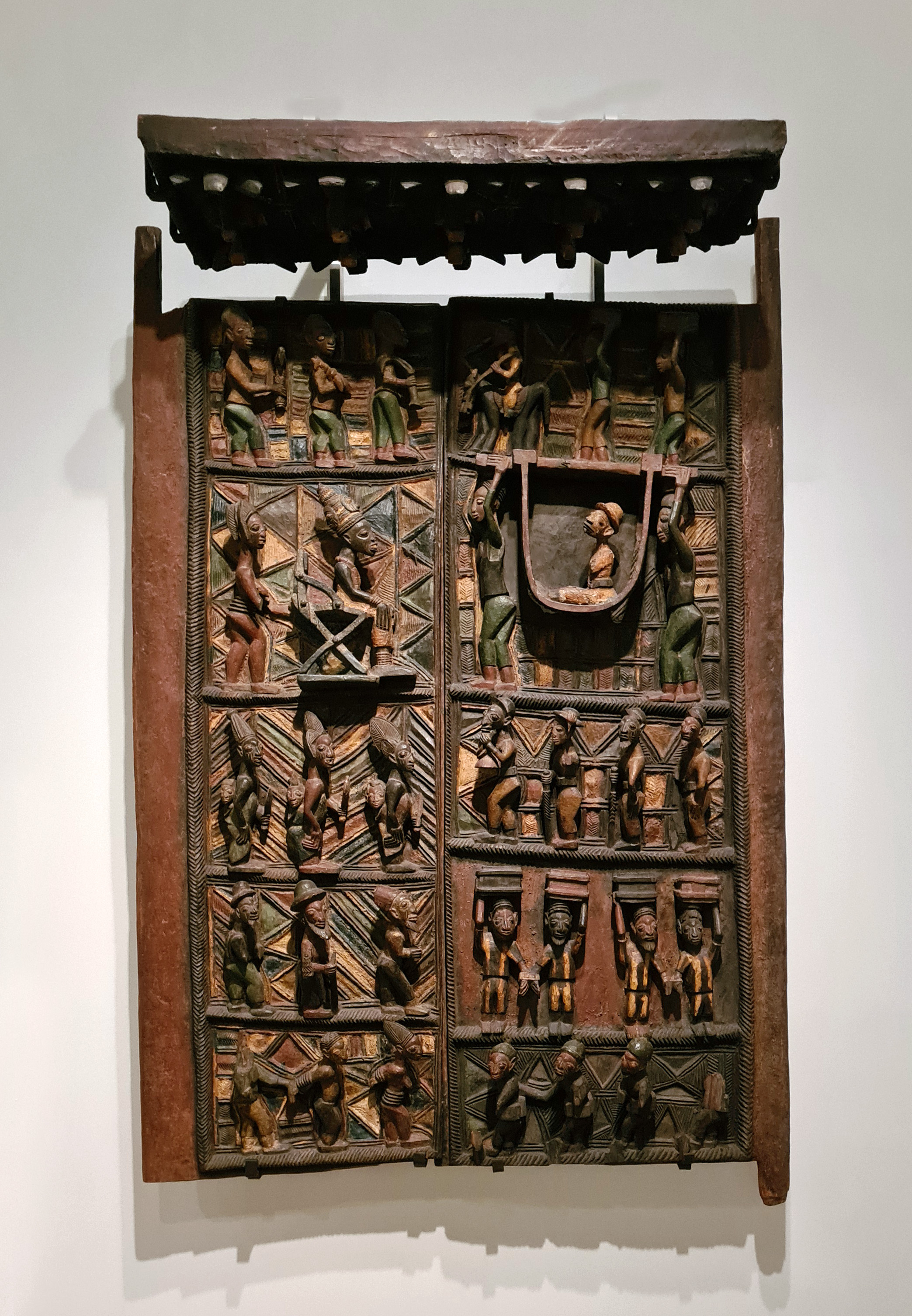
Palace door wooden panel from Ikere

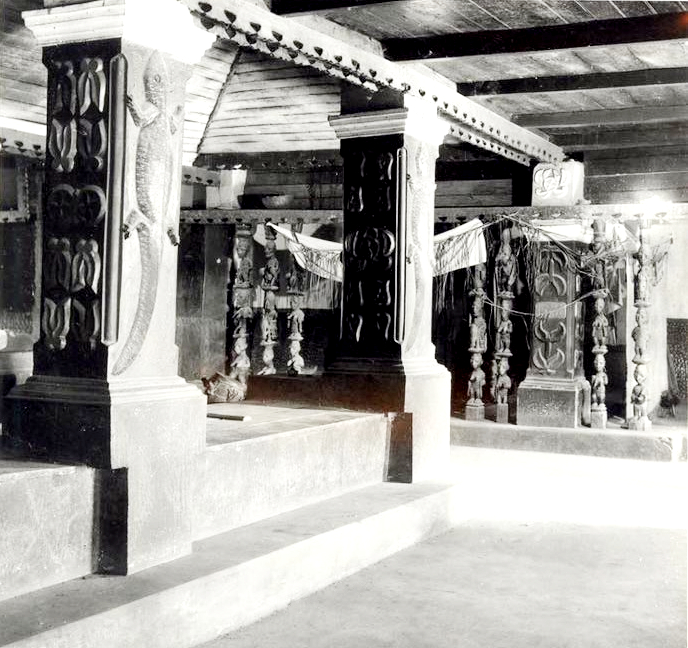
The interior of a building in Ode Ondo, capital of the Ondo Kingdom.

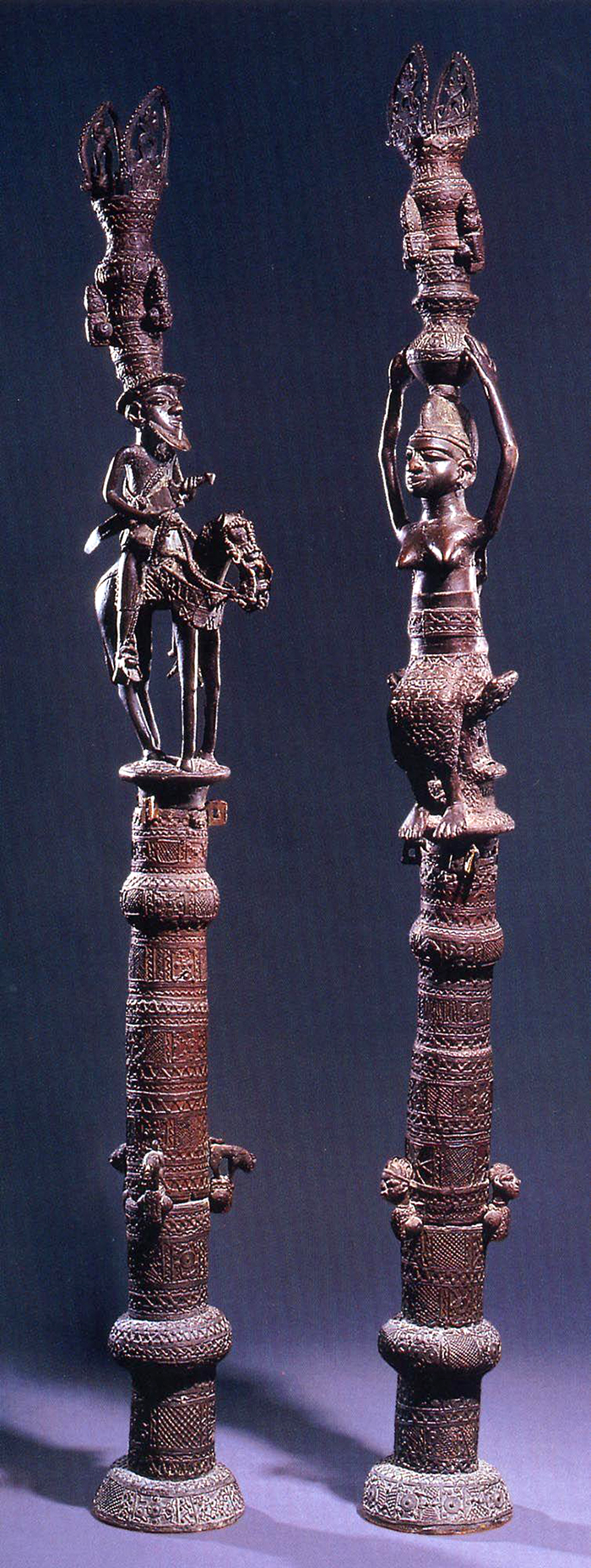
Brass supporting pillars from the Old Oyo royal palace, 2 meters in height.

== Yoruba Revival or Neo Yoruba architecture ==
There has been a revival in certain Yoruba building styles both in West Africa, as well as in the Americas.

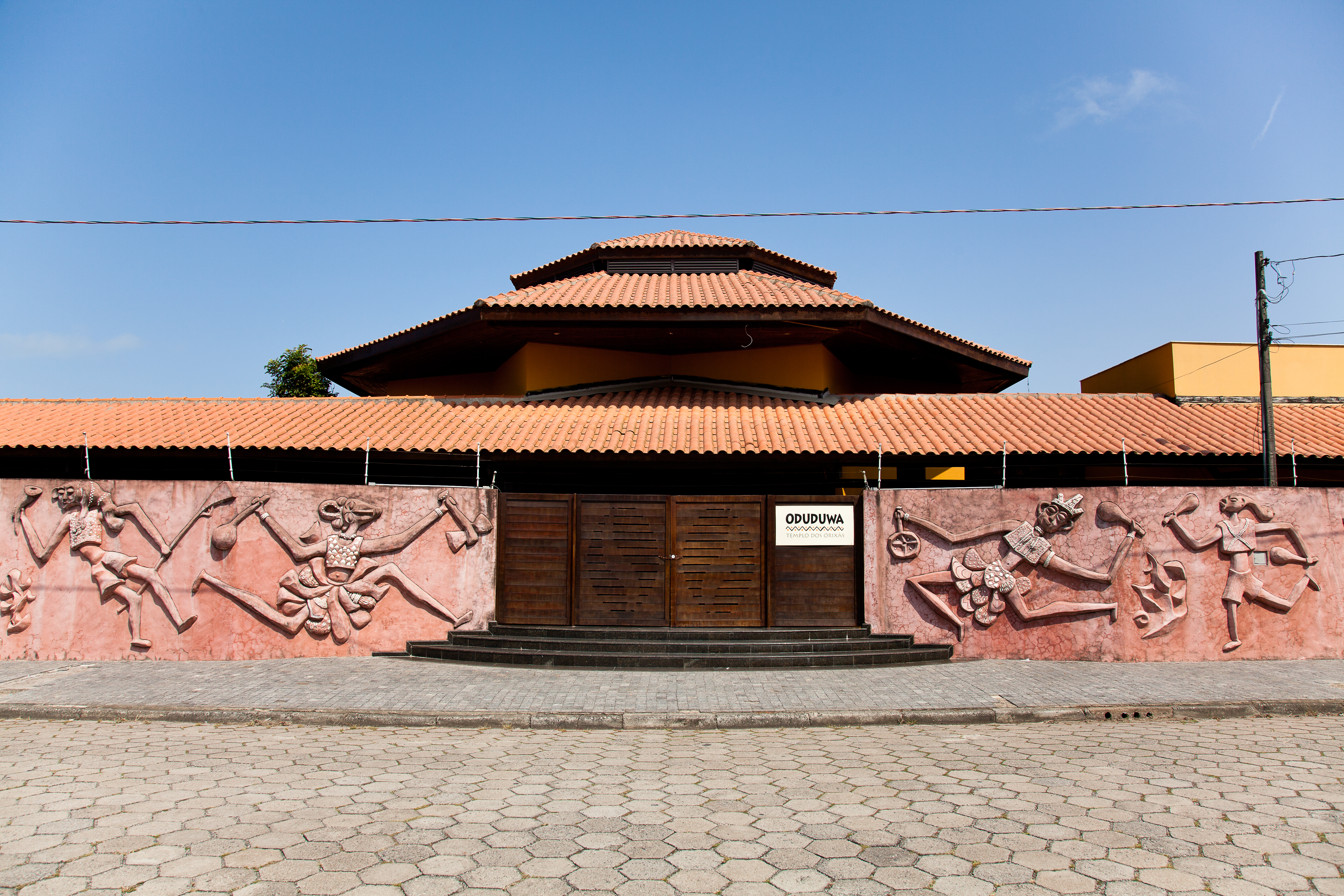
Oduduwa temple in Sao Paulo State, Brazil built in Yoruba style

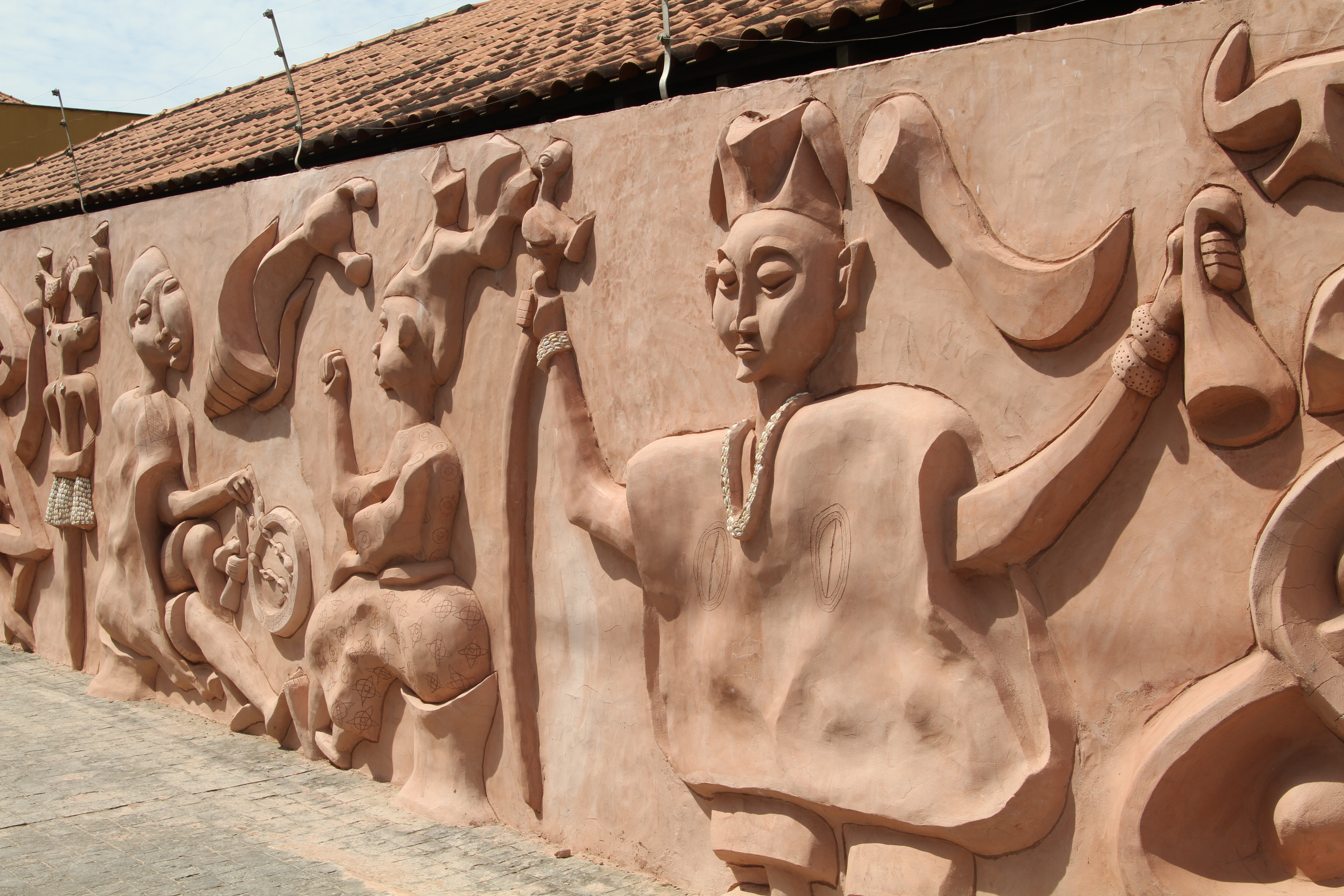
Yoruba murals on the walls of the Oduduwa temple, Sao Paulo, Brazil

=== Brazilian styles ===
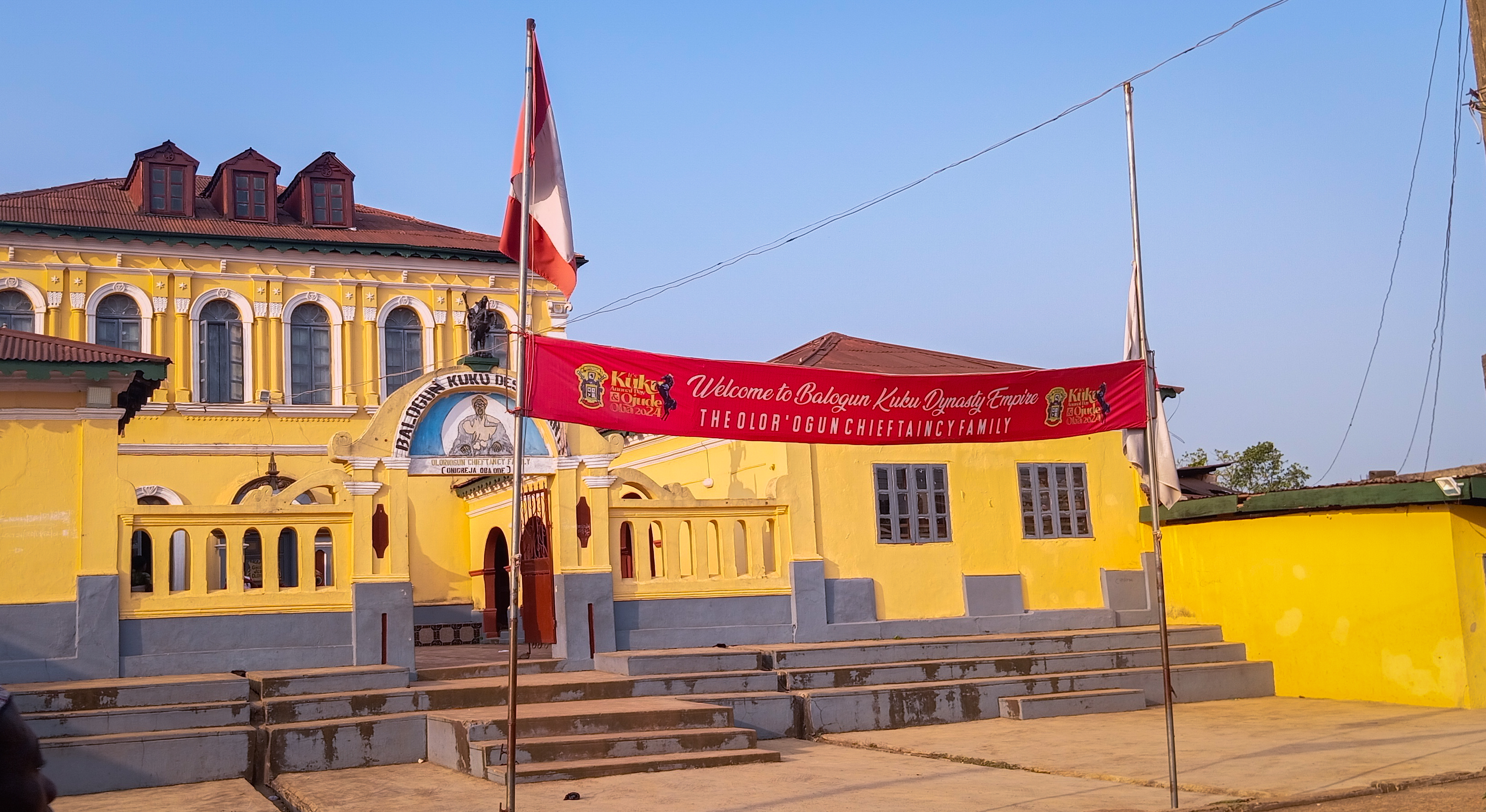
The Balogun Kuku family home in Ijebu Ode, an example of Yoru-Brazilian architecture

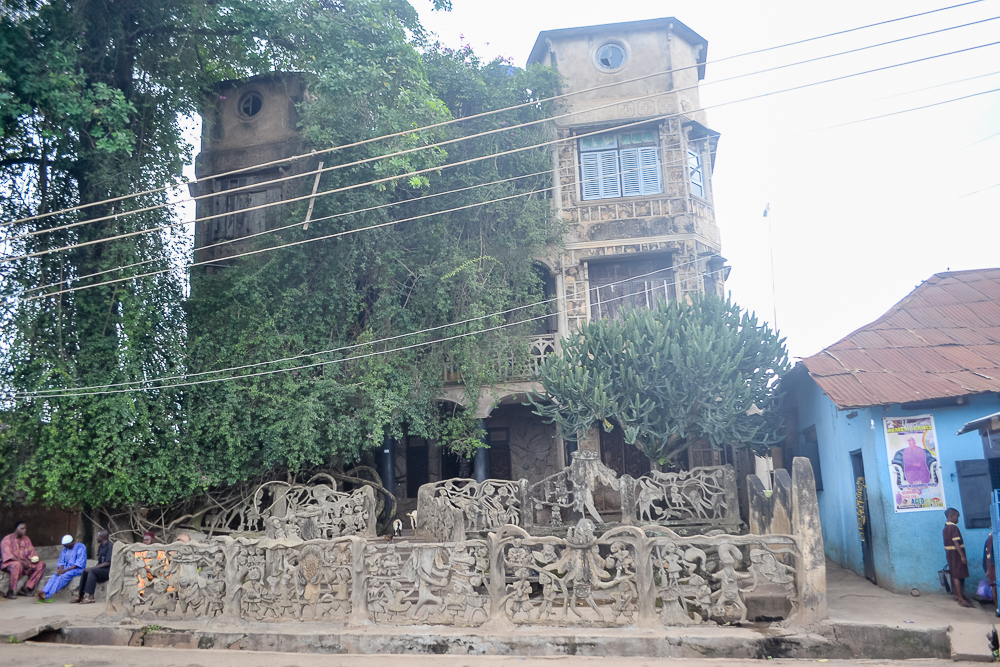
The house of Susanne Wenger in Osogbo, a blend of Yoruba and Afro-Brazilian architecture/Brazilian Yoruba architecture

Following the British conquest of Lagos, the town grew into a city with a varied population. This population consisted of the indigenous residents of Isale Eko (Lagos Island), Yoruba returnees from Brazil, Trinidad and Cuba, who had crossed the Atlantic twice, European merchants and British colonists, and mixed-race Creoles. Many African returnees from Brazil had trained in masonry, and they introduced stuccoed bungalows and multi-storey buildings with arched windows and doorways, influenced by Brazilian architecture. This style began to dominate colonial Lagos, especially in Olowogbowo, Popo Aguda, Ebute Metta and Yaba. Apprentices trained by the returnees later spread a modified variant across the region. These Brazilian style-houses were built with open spaces for ventilation between the tops of the walls and the roofs and verandahs on the front of back entrances. Two-story sobrados, quadrangular with central areas that could hold alcoves, chapels and staircases with accompanying passageways, became popular. A Sardinian established a brick and tile factory in Lagos, leading to affordable storey houses made from brick. The brick columns and walls were plastered with ornamentation, and further embellishments were incorporated into plinths, columns, shafts and bases.

Stately houses were built and reproduced in different shapes and sizes by the Yoruba returnees from the New World into the city of Lagos. Examples include: the residence of Andrew Thomas, a two-story Brazilian Yoruba-styled house designed with ornate works of plaster; Joaquim Devonde Branco's brickhouse, with wrought-iron windows; and the Caxton House on Marina, which was built with a two-story main building, two showrooms at each side of the main building, horse stables, and a garden.
