= Pacifico =

Pacifico may refer to:

== People ==
- Pacificus of Verona (776–844), 9th century archdeacon of Verona
- Pacificus (Pacifico), 13th-century follower of St. Francis of Assisi
- Pacificus of San Severino (1653–1721), 17th-century saint
- Pacifico Licutan (d. 1835), Brazilian Muslim slave involved in the Malê revolt
- Pacifico Discaya II (born 1975), Filipino businessman

== Sports ==
- Club Deportivo Pacífico FC, a Peruvian football club
- Pacífico F.C., a defunct Colombian football club

== Transport ==
- Pacífico (Madrid Metro), metro stop on Lines 1 and 6 of the Madrid Metro

== Brands and businesses ==
- Pacifico Yokohama, a convention center in Japan
- Pacífico (beer), a Mexican pilsner beer originally brewed in Mazatlán, Sinaloa

== Music ==
- Pacifico (singer), an Italian singer-songwriter, composer and musician

=== Albums ===
- Pacifico (album), an album by the Lassie Foundation, 2000
- Pacifico, an album by Pacifico (singer), 2002
- Pacifico, an album by Kantuta, 1993, nominated for best producer award at the 1994 New Zealand Music Awards

=== Songs ===
- "Pacifico", song by Ugly Casanova from Sharpen Your Teeth, 2002
- "Pacifico", song by Majid Jordan from Majid Jordan, 2016
