= Malê revolt =

1835 slave rebellion in Imperial Brazil

Date	January 1835
Location	Salvador, Bahia, Empire of Brazil
Result	Legalist victory, rebellion repelled

Belligerents
Empire of Brazil: National Guard	Malê slaves (primarily Nagôs)

Strength
Unknown, at least 3 battalions of guards	600+ insurgents

Casualties and losses
~7 killed	80+ killed 300 captured 5 executed

The Malê revolt (Portuguese: Revolta dos Malês, pronounced [ʁɛˈvɔwtɐ duz maˈle(j)s], [ʁeˈvɔwtɐ duz mɐˈle(j)s]) was a Muslim slave rebellion that broke out during the regency period in the Empire of Brazil. On a Sunday during Ramadan in January 1835, in the city of Salvador, a group of enslaved African Muslims and freedmen, inspired by Muslim teachers, rose up against the government. Muslims were called malê in Bahia at the time, from Yoruba imale that designated a Yoruba Muslim.

The uprising took place on the feast day of Our Lady of Guidance, a celebration in the Bonfim's church's cycle of religious holidays. As a result, many worshipers traveled to Bonfim for the weekend to pray or celebrate. Authorities were in Bonfim in order to keep the celebrations in line. Consequently, there would be fewer people and authorities in Salvador, making it easier for the rebels to occupy the city.

== Islam in Bahia ==
In Bahia, the Hausa were primarily identified with practicing Islam because they adopted Islam before coming over to Brazil. Over time however, the Nagô slaves made up a majority of Muslims in Bahia due to the rise of Islam in Yoruba kingdoms. In fact, by 1835 most of the Malês were Nagôs. Furthermore, many of the key figures important in planning the uprising were Nagôs including: Ahuna, Pacífico, and Manoel Calafate.

Within the Muslim community the Malês had power and prestige, especially the Muslims that had long standing. These members tried to attract new Malês. They did not do so passively, but through proselytizing and conversion.

In the African Islamic culture of Brazil, there were several external symbols that became associated with the Malês. One symbol came about through the adoption of amulets. In Bahia amulets were common because they were thought to have protective powers and were worn by both Muslims and non-Muslims. These amulets consisted of pieces of paper with passages from the Quran and prayers that were folded and placed in a leather pouch that was sewn shut. They were made and sold by álufas or preachers. These amulets, however, did not signify a strong commitment to Islam because they were associated with traditional, indigenous African religions. Another symbol of Islam in Bahia was the wearing of a long white frock called an abadá. In Bahia this garment was worn in private so they would not attract attention from law officials. It was only during the rebellion in 1835 that they were worn in public for the first time and were referred to as "war garments" by police. A third symbol which was used by Malês to identify themselves prior to the uprising were white, metal, silver, or iron rings placed on their fingers. However, when the Malês were defeated, these rings were no longer effective because now everyone knew what they meant.

== Growth of Islam in Bahia ==
The urban environment of Salvador facilitated the spread of Islam due to the greater mobility of slaves, the large number of freemen, and the networks between these two groups. All Malês, slave or free, who knew how to read and write Arabic would spread this knowledge on street corners. The houses of freedmen also provided a place for the practice of Islam, as well as slaves own quarters (in their master's house) or "private mosques" which were rooms the Malês rented out (the majority of which were in downtown Salvador). At these places Malês met to pray, memorize verses from the Qur'an, and learn how to read and write (on wooden writing slates) Arabic. The Malês also wrote matters of their faith on paper, despite its high cost.

In Bahia, the Malês had to innovate some aspects of Islam because they feared persecution by officials, but tried to maintain its basic characteristics. For example, the Malês gathered frequently to eat suppers together to represent their effort to commit themselves to the aspect of Islam to only eat food prepared by Muslim hands. They ate mutton often, which signifies ritual sacrifices. During Ramadan their diet consisted of yams, bugloss, rice, milk, and honey. They ended Ramadan by sacrificing a ram. In addition, the Malês celebrated main religious days such as Lailat al-Miraj, which was a sign of success in Bahia because Malês had become a well-defined segment of the Bahian black community.

== The revolt ==
While the revolt was scheduled to take place on Sunday, January 25, due to various incidents, it was forced to start before the planned time. On Saturday January 24, slaves began to hear rumors of an upcoming rebellion. While there are multiple accounts of freed slaves telling their previous masters about the revolts, only one was reported to the proper authorities. Sabina da Cruz, an ex-slave, had a fight with her husband, Vitório Sule the day before and went looking for him. She found him in a house with many of the other revolt organizers and after they told her tomorrow they would be masters of the land she reportedly said, "on the following day they'd be masters of the whiplash, but not of the land." After leaving this house, she went to her friend Guilhermina, a freedwoman, who Sabina knew had access to whites. Guilhermina then proceeded to tell her white neighbor, André Pinto da Silveira. Several of Pinto de Silveira's friends were present, including Antônio de Souza Guimarães and Francisco Antônio Malheiros, who took it upon themselves to relay the information to the local authorities. All of these events occurred between the hours of 9:30 and 10:30 pm on Saturday January 24.

President of Bahia Province Francisco de Souza Martins informed the Chief of Police of the situation, reinforced the palace guard, alerted the barracks, doubled the night patrol, and ordered boats to watch the bay, all by 11:00 pm. At around 1:00 am on Sunday, justices of the peace searched the home of Domingos Marinho de Sá. Domingos reported to the patrol that the only Africans in his house were his tenants. However, sensing Domingos' fear, the justices asked to see for themselves. They went down into his basement and found the ringleaders, discussing last minute details. The Africans were able to turn the officers out into the streets and then started the revolt.

Out on the streets, the fighting saw its first real bloodshed; several people were injured and two Africans were killed, including Vitório Sule, Sabina da Cruz's husband. After securing the area, the rebels split up to go in different directions throughout the city. Most of the groups did very little fighting because they were recruiters, calling slaves to war. However, the largest group traveled up the hill toward Palace Square (modern-day Praça Municipal), and continued to fight.

The rebels decided to first attack the jail, attempting to free a Muslim leader, Pacífico Licutan. However, the prison guards proved too much for the rebels, who perhaps were looking to supplement their weak supply of arms with the jailers'. Unfortunately for the rebels, the reinforced palace guard began firing on them from across the square and they found themselves caught between lines of fire in front of the jail. Under heavy fire, the slaves withdrew from the prison and retreated to the Largo de Teatro. Reinforcements arrived on the slaves' side, and together they attacked a nearby post of soldiers in order to take their weapons. They marched toward the officer's barracks, and put up a good fight, however, the soldiers were able to pull the gate guarding the barracks shut. The slaves had failed.

The rebels worked their way towards the Vitória neighborhood, where a number of Muslim slaves lived in the English community there. They regrouped at Mercês Convent where the sacristan, a Nagô slave named Agostinho, was a member of the conspiracy. The convent was a pre-determined spot for regrouping. A police patrol came across the rebels here, but retreated from their counter-attack to Fort São Pedro—a stronghold the rebels did not try to assault. By now the rebels numbered several hundred, but they had not been able to achieve any of their goals. They now headed towards Cabrioto, outside the city to rendezvous with slaves from plantations outside Salvador. In order to get to Cabrioto, however, they would have to pass the cavalry barracks. And when they met in Água de Meninos, the most decisive battle of the revolt took place. At about 3:00 am, the rebels reached Água de Meninos. The footsoldiers immediately retreated inside the confines of the barracks while the men on horseback stayed outside. The rebels, who now only numbered about 50–60, did not attempt to attack the barracks. Instead, they sought a way around it.

However, they were met with fire from the barracks, followed by a cavalry charge, which proved too powerful for the slaves to overcome. After the rebels were completely devastated, more slaves arrived. After assessing the situation, the slaves decided that their only hope would be to attack and take the barracks. However, this desperate attempt proved futile, and the rebels quickly decided to flee. The cavalry mounted one last charge that finished them off.

== Leadership ==
- Elesbão do Corma – Elesbão do Corma was a Hausa freedman who was known in the African community as Dandará. He owned a tobacco shop which was also used as a meeting place for Malês. He also traveled through the Recôncavo for his business, and brought the Muslim faith to slaves on the plantations there.[1]
- Ahuna – Ahuna was a Nagô slave who lived in Salvador. He traveled frequently to Santo Amaro where his owner had a sugar plantation. It has been suggested that his presence was a key factor in the timing of the rebellion.
- Pacifico Licutan – Licutan was a Nagô slave who worked as a tobacco roller. He was in prison at the time of the rebellion, and one of the main goals was to free him.
- Luís Sanim – Sanim was a Nupe people slave who also worked as a tobacco roller. He ran a fund where each member contributed a day's wages from slave labor, presumably monthly, and this money was divided into three parts: one part for cloth to make Muslim garments; a part to masters' portions of slave wages—since Malê slaves did not work on Fridays; and one part to help buy letters of manumission.
- Manoel Calafate – Calafate travelled to Santo Amaro to mobilize rebels on the eve of the uprising. He took an active part in the fighting and appears to have been killed in Palace Square.

== Aftermath ==
Fearful that the whole state of Bahia would follow the example of Saint-Domingue (Haiti) and rise up and revolt, the authorities quickly sentenced four of the rebels to death, sixteen to prison, eight to forced labour, and forty-five to flogging. Two hundred of the remainder of the surviving leaders of the revolt were then deported by municipal authorities back to Africa; they employed the slaver Francisco Félix de Sousa for the Atlantic journey. The deportees, who consisted of freed and enslaved Africans, were sent in stages to the Bight of Benin starting in 1835, specifically to the existing Lusophone colony in Dahomey. It is believed that some members of the Brazilian community in Lagos, Nigeria, and the Tabom people of Ghana are descended from this deportation, although descendants of these Afro-Brazilian repatriates are reputed to be widespread throughout West Africa (such as Sylvanus Olympio, the first president of Togo). The term "Aguda" on the other hand refers to the mainstream, predominantly Christian Brazilian returnees to Lagos who brought Catholicism in their wake; which is why that denomination is often referenced in Yoruba as "Ijo Aguda" (the Portuguese Church).

News of the revolt reverberated throughout Brazil and news of it appeared in press of the United States and England. Fearing the example might be followed, the Brazilian authorities began to watch the malês very carefully. National and local laws were passed to further control enslaved people in Brazil; these included the death penalty without possibility of recourse for the murder of a plantation owner, overseer, or family members of a plantation owner. In subsequent years intensive efforts were made to force conversions to Catholicism and erase the popular memory and affection towards Islam. However, the African Muslim community was not erased overnight, and as late as 1910 it is estimated there were still some 100,000 African Muslims living in Brazil.

Many consider this rebellion to be the turning point of slavery in Brazil. Widespread discussion of the end of the Atlantic slave trade appeared in the press. While slavery existed for more than fifty years following the Malê revolt, the slave trade was abolished in 1851. Slaves continued to pour into Brazil immediately following the rebellion, which caused fear and unrest among the people of Brazil. They feared that bringing in more slaves would just fuel another rebel army. Although it took a little over fifteen years to happen, the slave trade was abolished in Brazil, due in part to the 1835 rebellion.
