= Impluvium =

Feature of a house to collect rain-water

A domus, with impluvium numbered 7

The impluvium (pl.: impluvia) is a water-catchment pool system meant to capture rain-water flowing from the compluvium, an area of roof. Often placed in a courtyard, under an opening in the roof, and thus "inside", instead of "outside", a building, it is a notable feature in many architectural traditions.

== Greco-Roman impluvium ==
In Greco-Roman architectural studies, the impluvium refers to the sunken part of the atrium in a Greek or Roman house (domus), designed to carry away the rainwater falling from the compluvium of the roof. It is usually made of marble and placed about 30 cm below the floor of the atrium, and emptied into a subfloor cistern.

=== Construction and use ===
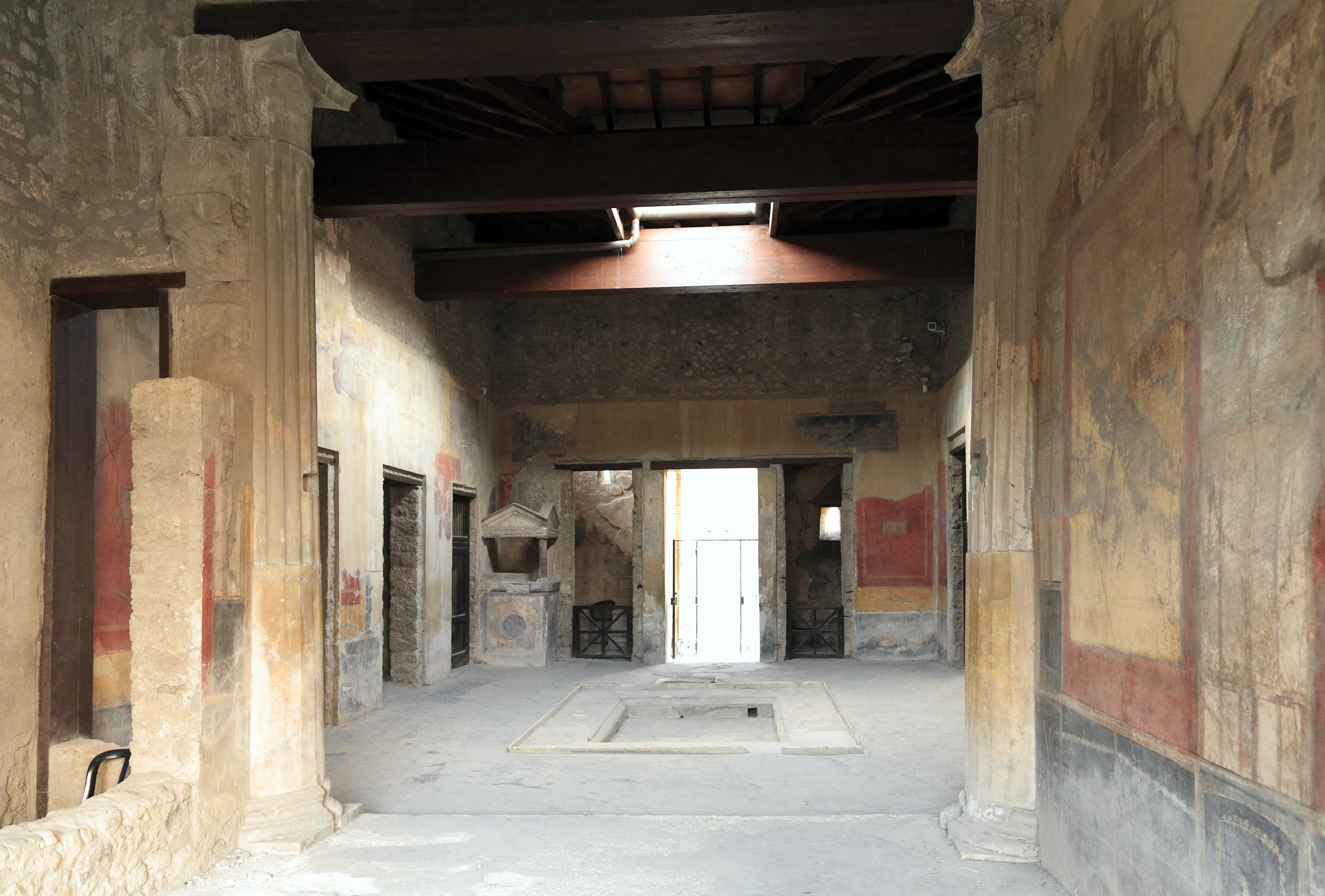
Impluvium in the center of the atrium of the House of Menander, Pompeii

Impluvium cistern under the atrium. Small well to draw water not in the picture.

Inspection (without excavation) of impluvia in Paestum, Pompeii and Rome indicated that the pavement surface in the impluvia was porous, or that the non-porous stone tiles were separated by gaps significant enough to allow a substantial quantity of water caught in the basin of the impluvium to filter through the cracks and, beyond, through layers of gravel and sand into a holding chamber below ground. A circular stone opening protected with a puteal allows easy access by bucket and rope to this private, filtered and naturally cooled water supply.

Similar water supplies were found elsewhere in the public spaces of the city, with their stone puteals showing the wear patterns of much use. In wet seasons, excess water that could not pass through the filter would overflow the basin and exit the building, and any sediment or debris remaining in the surface basin could be swept away. In hot weather, water could be drawn from the cistern chamber (or fetched by slaves from supplies outside the domus) and cast into the shallow pool to evaporate and provide a cooling effect to the entire atrium: as the water evaporated, air drawn in through the compluvium was cooled and moved throughout the house to cool the surrounding living spaces, a form of passive cooling. The combination of compluvium and impluvium formed an ingenious, effective and attractive manner of collecting, filtering and cooling rainwater.

== West and Central African impluvium ==
Denyer, African Traditional Architecture, defined an impluvial style of architecture in West Africa, wherein "four buildings usually faced one another across [a] courtyard". Buildings of the "style" (really, a "clade-based" type), did not necessarily feature an impluvium to capture rain. Further complicating matters, some texts have conflated Denyer's impluvial style with impluvium itself, and thereby take impluvium to refer not to the use of mechanisms to capture water, but instead to court yard-centered house plans.

=== Examples ===
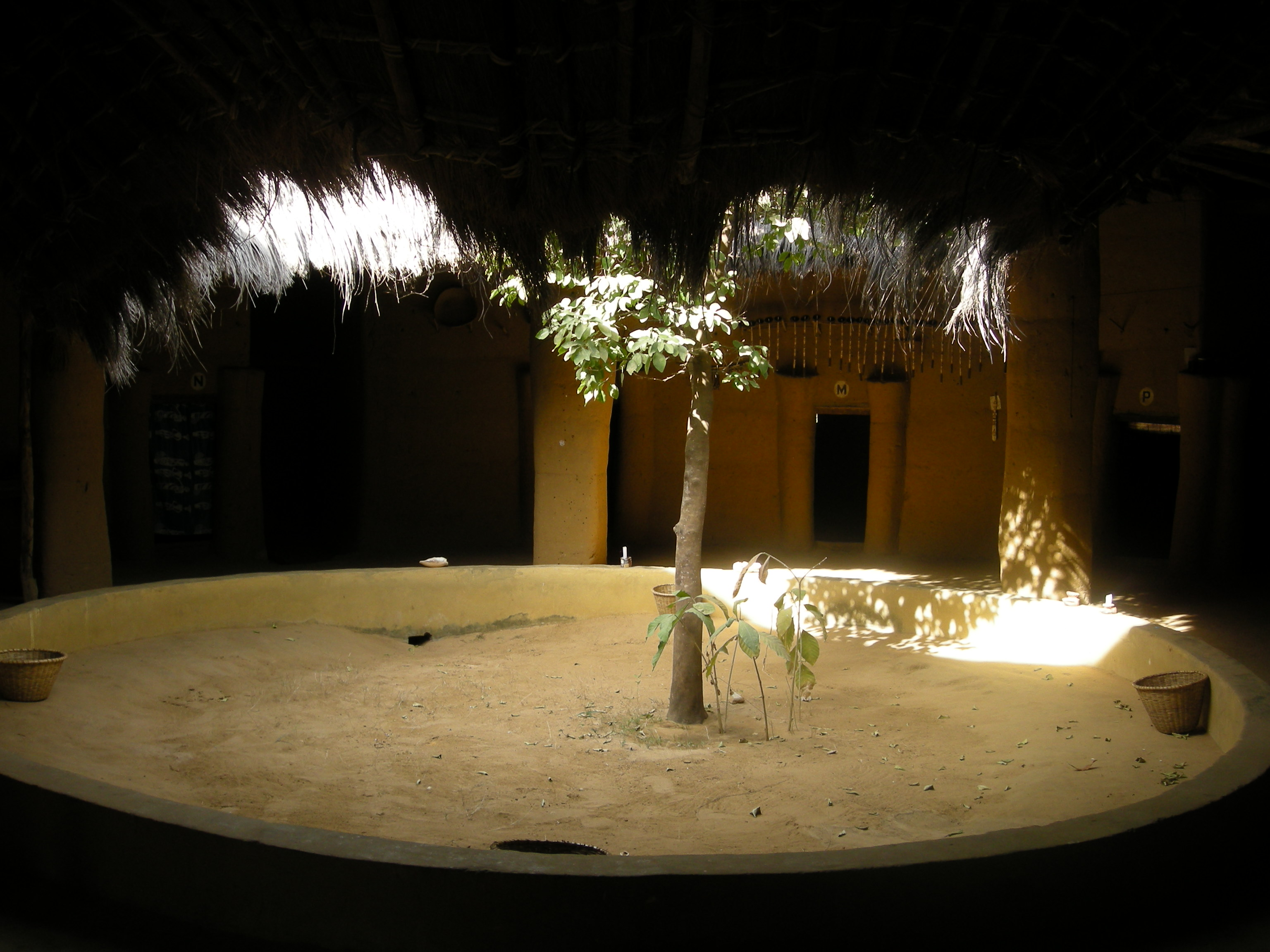
Impluvium in a house in Casamance, Senegal

Impluvia have been observed in many West/Central-African architectural traditions, including those of the Igbo, Yoruba, Edo, Jola and Bamum. These ranged in complexity: Yoruba impluvia, referred to as akodi, sometimes only amounted to pots placed at the corners of vast rectilinear courtyards, while some in Ketu, Benin Republic, were drained into underground tanks. Commoners in the Benin kingdom usually had houses with multiple impluvia in their one or two court spaces, sometimes drained out of the house by pipes. As Nevadomsky et al. note, these impluvia were meant to remove rain water so that the open roof could be used as a light source and source of fresh air. While many previous examples have been rectilinear, the impluvia of Senegal could also be designed around round floor plans; this has become the basis for the 'Case à Impluvium" in Ziguinchor, Senegal, a centre of the arts run by the Alliance Franco-Sénégalaise.

=== Origins ===
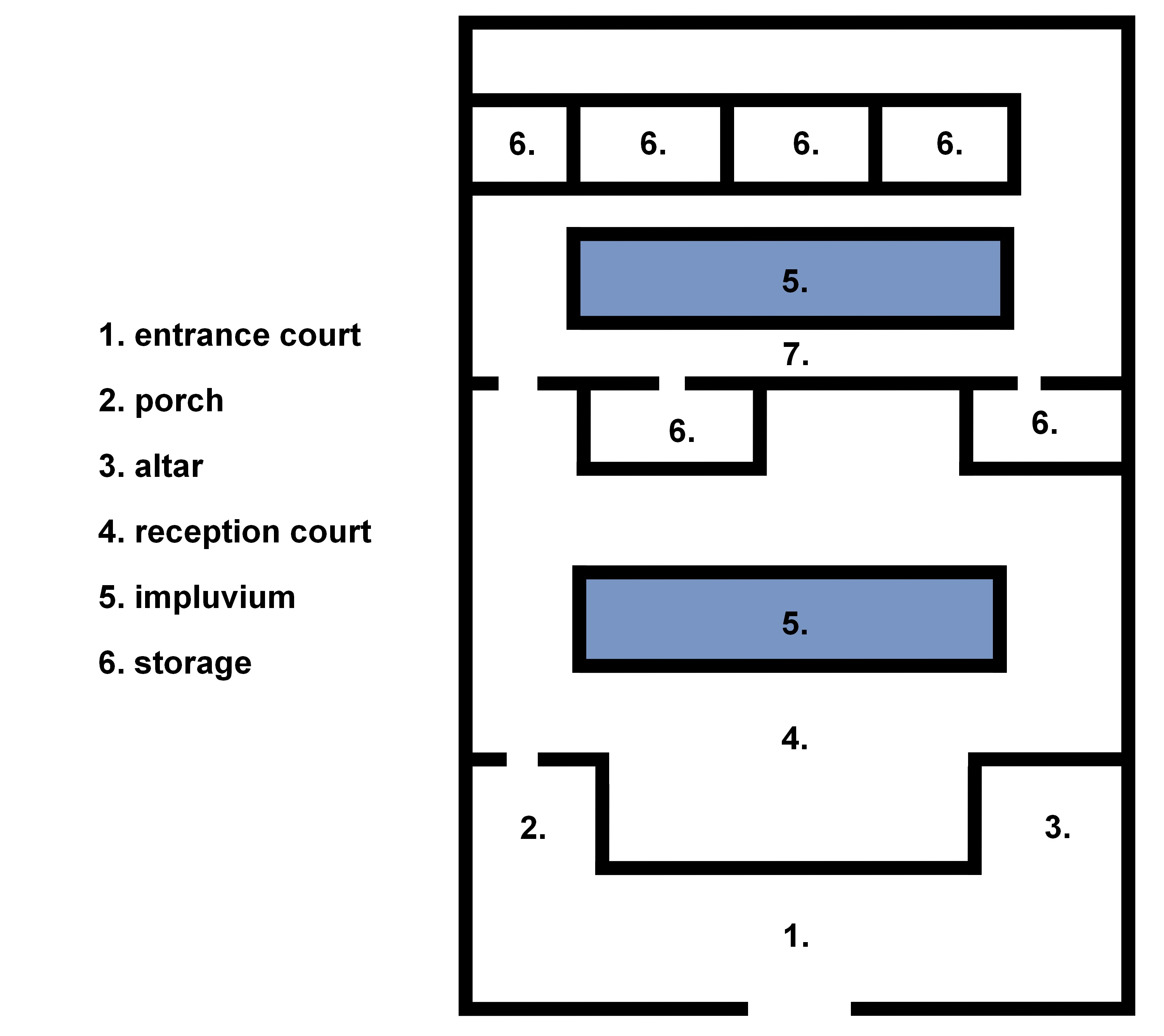
Plan of a house from Southern Nigeria, Benin country

19th and 20th century European travelers were often surprised to find parallels to classical culture in those architectural traditions that had clear ones: "In the Bamum area there is an interesting type of hut. In referring to it Ankermann says: "The men's houses (Herrenhäuser) in Bamum, in contrast to those of the women, show a most complicated structure. I was very much astonished when I entered for the first time to find myself in an actual Roman atrium with an impluvium in the middle, with the roof sloping towards the middle, and supported by columns." This resulted in a number of theories attempting to tie West and Central African impluvium to Greco-Roman, Egyptian, and Portuguese influences. While Kalaous rejects the possibility of Portuguese influence, he writes that "The Old Mediterranean influence seems to be more plausible but did not necessarily come via Egypt... Of course, this does not prove that there were contacts between the Etruscans and the peoples of what is now Southern Nigeria, but the existence of impluvium there (and elsewhere in West Africa) is certainly not easy to explain in terms of a quite independent origin." Denyer, on the other hand, notes that "No really large settlement could have taken place in this area [Southern Nigeria] before a means of collecting water had been found", to save for the dry season and to manage erosion. Most bluntly, Nevadomsky et al. write that "One need not postulate an external source for what was in all probability an independent evolution of space and form. The impluvium house could easily have arisen in a climate of hot sunshine and heavy seasonal rainfall."

== See also ==
- Ancient Roman architecture
- Ancient Greek architecture
- Igbo Architecture
- Yoruba architecture
- Benin Kingdom
