= Pacifico Licutan =

Muslim slave and Islamic community and religious leader in colonial Brazil

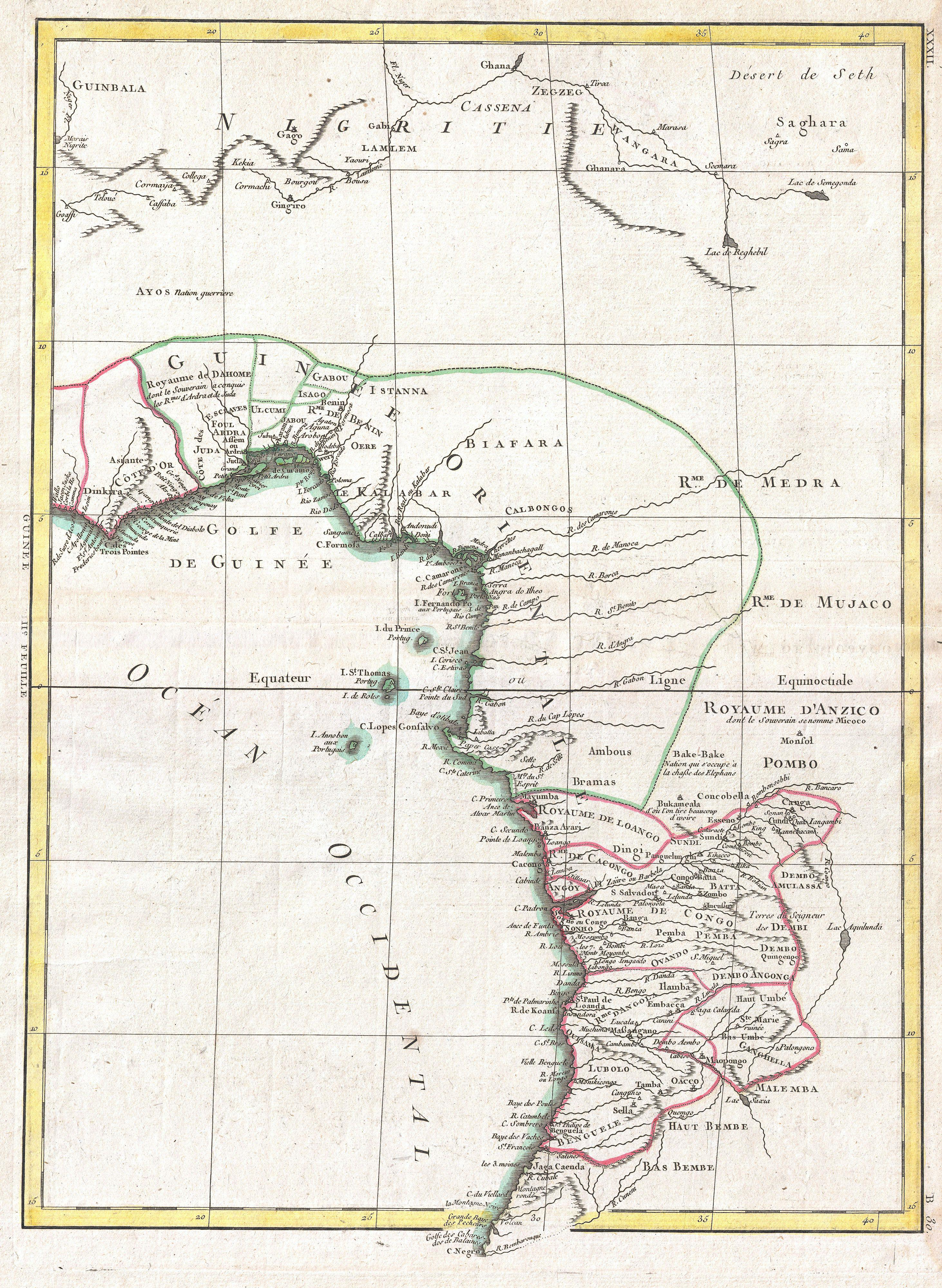
The Bight of Benin, home region to ethnic Yoruba slaves, such as Pacifico Licutan.

Pacífico Licutan was a Muslim slave and Islamic community and religious leader in colonial Brazil in the 1800s, and was involved in the 1835 Malê Revolt in a leadership capacity. He was not killed in the revolt but did die shortly afterwards, after 11 February 1835.

He was also known as "Bilal", a connection to the Islamic figure Bilal ibn Rabah and a regional word for prayer caller, following and in his trial related to the 1835 Malê revolt. His birth-date is unknown.

== Life ==
Licutan was a Yoruba—also referred to as the ethnic group Nagô, as opposed to the Hausa ethnicity—, the largest group of Muslims in Salvador or Bahia at the time.

Licutan was a tobacco roller living in Salvador, Bahia, Brazil. He was owned by a doctor, Antonio Pinto de Mesquita Varalle. Licutan was active in the Islamic community and was considered a mestre, or teacher in Portuguese, or alufa to the Yoruba, in his community. Attempts to buy Licutan and free him by his Islamic fellows and followers were ineffective, as they were refused twice. When his owner died he was seized and imprisoned in November 1834, to be sold away in order to service debts of his deceased master.

As a Nagô, he came from an area now known as Southern Nigeria. Despite only making up 4.5% of Brazilian slaves, Nagô people were influential in the Afro-Brazilian community in general and in Bahia particularly, and were also often Muslim, contributing to the closely knit community in Salvador.

== Bahian Malê Revolt ==
Over the month of Ramadan he was held and the Muslim community plotted the eventual revolt, but had accidentally leaked the plan. Leading up to the night of Layla al-Quadr, or the night of Power and destiny, the government prepared for the revolt. Before the night of 25 January 1835, troops moved on the soon to be rebels and attacked at breakfast, and the Bahian Slave revolt began. The slaves were, with relative ease, crushed, attacking the prison and barracks but breaking before sustained fire and cavalry charges.

The majority of the group were male African Slaves, and many were Yoruba (Nagô) from the Bight of Benin despite its low share to the total slave imports. 61% of tried slaves after the revolt were Nagô, and Nagô leaders show up most in period documentation of the revolt and the individuals held responsible for the disruption and loss of life.

After the revolt ended, the Brazilian authorities failed, despite torturing him, to acquire names of other Muslims or students of the old Alufa. In records pertaining to the uprising written shortly after it happened, Licutan is recorded as either the most or the second most beloved figure in the Muslim community at the time, and a recognized authority in a religious tradition for which all scriptural forms had to have been brought over by memory.

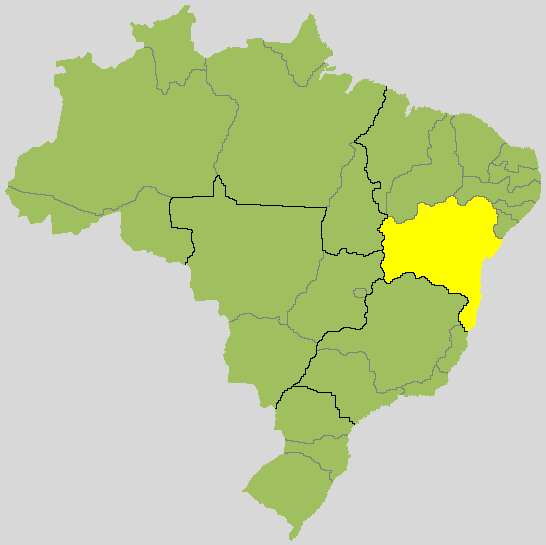
State of Bahia in Brazil, Capital, Salvador

=== Impact on Latin American Islam ===
This event is one of the few Muslim related topics with even moderate engagement in the historical community, and as a result proper comparison to particularly other Muslim revolts but even other religious groups is limited compared to other regions. Historiographically the jury is not out on exactly what role Islam did play in the inciting of the large revolt, and what conclusions to draw from data regarding previous smaller revolts.
