= Hijab – Mulheres de véu =

2013 film directed by Paulo Halm

- Theatrical release poster
- Directed by: Paulo Halm
- Written by: Paulo Halm
- Distributed by: Formosa Filmes
- Release date: 6 September 2013
- Running time: 78 minutes
- Country: Brazil
- Language: Portuguese

Hijab – Mulheres de véu (Hijab – Veiled Women) is a 2013 Brazilian documentary film directed by Paulo Halm.

== Synopsis ==
Patricia, Zahreen, Jamile, Maria, Jamila and Marcela are carioca women who adopted Islam as a religion and began to wear the hijab, a traditional veil that covers the hair of Muslim women. The film dialogues with these women and shows the consequences of this religious option in their relationship with their families, at school and work.
