= Pacifico (album) =

Studio album by The Lassie Foundation
- Released: 1999
- Recorded: 1997–1998
- Genre: Rock
- Label: Self-released (initial), Grand Theft Autumn (re-release)

The Lassie Foundation chronology
Pacifico (1999)	The El Dorado LP (2001)

Professional ratings
Review scores
Source	Rating
AllMusic	4.5/5 stars
PopMatters	(Mixed)

Pacifico is the first studio album by the rock band The Lassie Foundation. It was originally self-released in 1999, but the band re-released the album on October 31, 2000, on the Grand Theft Autumn label. The album has minor-key melodies and falsetto harmonies. The songs contain much guitar, which give the album a fuzzy, shoegaze feel with a lot of feedback. The album is heavily influenced by both My Bloody Valentine and the Beach Boys. The album was highly acclaimed by AllMusic.

== Track listing ==
- All songs composed by the band.
1. "Scapa Flow" - 1:24
2. "Dive Bomber" - 4:21
3. "Crown of the Sea" - 4:03
4. "She's the Coming Sun/She's Long Gone" - 3:17
5. "Come On Let Your Lime Light Shine" - 3:18
6. "El Rey" - 4:09
7. "The Moon Won't Let You Wait" - 3:35
8. "Kisses as Bounties" - 3:13
9. "I've Got the Rock and Roll for You" - 4:09
10. "Bombers Moon" - 4:38
11. "You Are Infinity" - 3:53
