= Shia Islam in the Americas =

Islam in the Americas

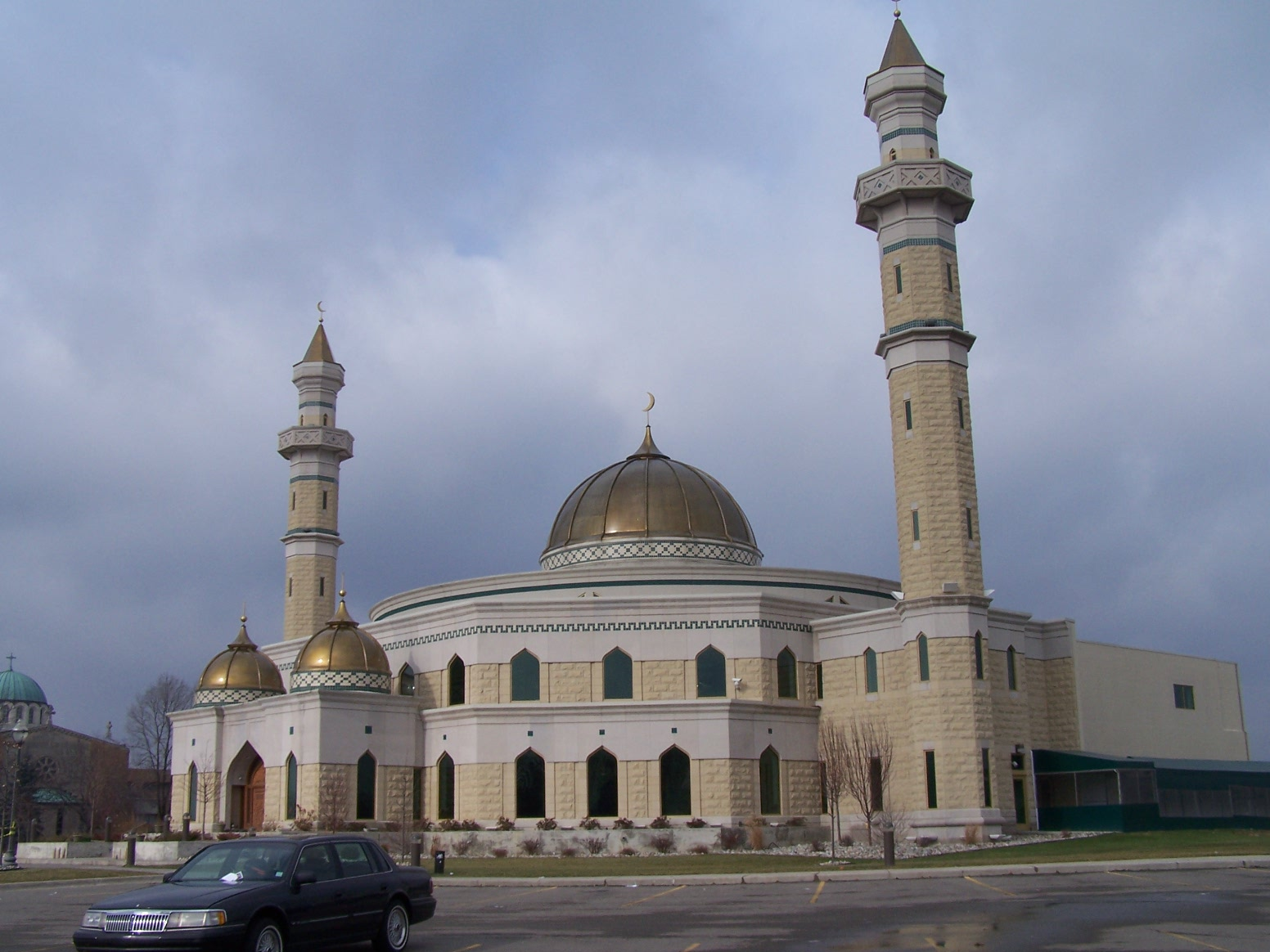
The Islamic Center of America, the largest and the oldest mosque (founded in 1963) in the US, located in Dearborn, Michigan

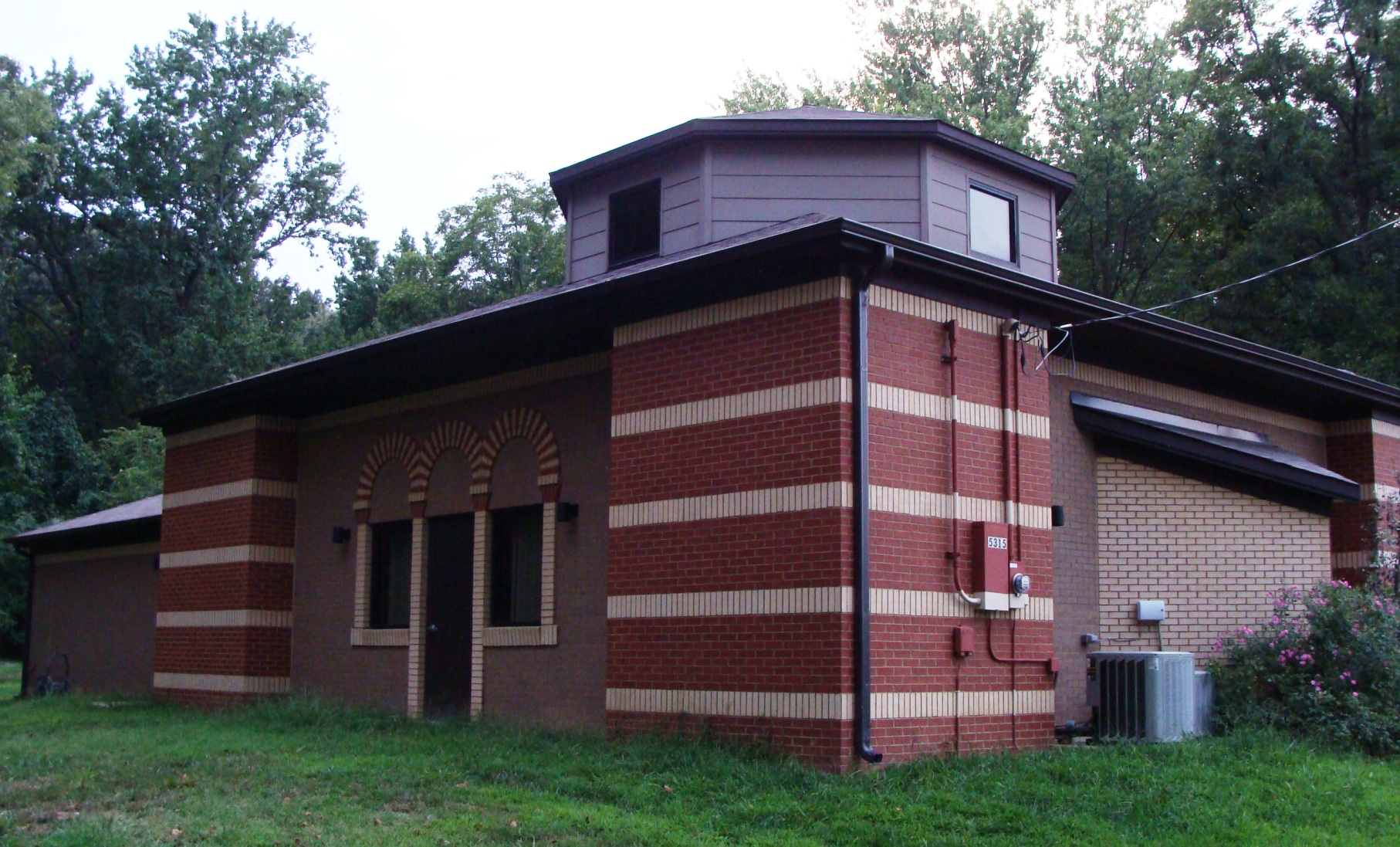
Memphis Al-Rasool Mosque, a Shia mosque in Memphis, Tennessee, United States

A 2009 survey by the Pew Research Center estimated that 10-13% of Muslims worldwide adhere to Shia Islam, with a global total of between 154 million and 200 million Shia Muslims. In the Americas, Pew estimated a population of just under 4.6 million Muslims overall in 2009, with a small portion of those being Shia.

The Pew survey estimated a Shia population of 300,000 Shias in North America, about 10.0% of North America's Muslim population. Also, according to Shafaqna News agency, Shia (Shia) Muslims are approximately 2.5 million persons in the U.S.

== North America ==
A 2009 Pew survey estimated that around 300,000 Shias lived in North America (including the United States), about 10% of North America's Muslim population. American Shia Muslim community are from different part of the world such as South Asia, Europe, Middle East, and East Africa. They are mainly from Arab countries such as Iraq, Lebanon, as well as non-Arab countries such as Iran, Pakistan and others. The second group of Shias are Americans who have become Shias in a variety of ways. The population of Shia Muslims in the United States is about 900,000, which is 15% of the total Muslim population in the country.

Those Shia Muslims have many activities and founded several organization such as Islamic Center of America and North American Shia Ithna-Asheri Muslim Communities Organization (NASIMCO).

The first group of immigrant Shias migrated to the United States from Lebanon and Syria about one hundred and eighty years ago (1824-1878). These Shia Muslims migrated to cities such as Detroit, Michigan, and Ross (California) and North Dakota.

== In Brazil ==
Brazil, a vast South American country, has approximately one million Shia Muslims from the time of the Ottoman Empire. Many Lebanese emigrants to Brazil resulted in an increase Shia beliefs. In Brazil, Shia Muslims generally live in Curitiba. They have many activities and have established several Islamic centers and institutes for the propagation of Shia beliefs and the message of Ahl al-Bayt. For this reason, there are several related places for Shia Muslims in São Paulo, such as the Prophet of Allah Muhammad mosque and the Imam Khomeini Islamic Center. Also, Shias have one mosque, Imam Ali mosque, where Shia and Sunni may pray together. In recent years, Shia and Sunni scholars have had several meetings with each other. Many Shia books are translated into Portuguese such as Nahjul Balagha.

== In Canada ==
The population of Shia Muslims in Canada is approximately 300,000 people (who are including Twelvers/Ismailis), out of about 850,000 Muslims who are in the country. The majority of the mentioned—Shia—Muslims are Iranians, Pakistanis, Iraqis, Syrians, Lebanese, Indians, Afghans, Azeris; and are also from Tanzania, Kenya and Uganda.

There are more than 360 mosques and Islamic centers in Canada, 80 of which are owned by Shia Muslims.

== Shia organizations in the Americas ==
- The Islamic Center of America is a Shia mosque in Dearborn, Michigan. It is the oldest Shia mosque in the United States and the largest in North America (founded in 1963). The institution known as "heart of Shiism" in the United States.
- North American Shia Ithna-Asheri Muslim Communities (NASIMCO) is a religious-cultural organization for Shia followers in the North of America. Islamic education board of the NASIMCO have investigated and standardized Shia books and also published several references in Shia history and theology.
- The Council of Shia Muslim Scholars was founded in North America in 1994 and is known as the central organization for Shia followers.
- The Al-Khoei foundation was established in the 1980s by Seyyid Abul Qasim Musawi Al-Khoei, Grand Ayatullah and scholar of Shia in New York.
- Al Baqee Organization is registered in 2003 in Illinois and is known as the central organization for leading initiatives and activism on the preservation and restoration of Islamic heritage globally.

Several other organizations and institutions are active in the Americas, including:

Province	Organization(s)
California	Ja'faria Islamic Society; Shia Association of Bay Area; Zainabia Islamic Society; Institute of Islamic Philosophy and Mystical Thought; Stockton Islamic Library; Shia Ithna-Asheri Islamic Jamaat of Los Angeles; Islamic Center of North California; Islamia Mosque
Connecticut	Islamic Institute of Ahl'albait; Jafaria Association of Connecticut
Georgia	Caravaan-e-Haider; Jaffari Center of Atlanta; Dar-E-Abbas, Lilburn, GA; Zainabia Youth; Zainabia Islamic Educational Center; Sahebozzaman Islamic Center of Atlanta
Idaho	Imam Al Mahdi (AF) Islamic Center
Illinois	Al Asr Organization of Chicago; Midwest Association. of Shia Organized Muslims
Massachusetts	Islamic Center, Quincy, MA; Islamic Masumeen Center, Hopkinton, MA
Maryland	Idara-e-Jafria; Imamia Center Inc; Imam Mahdi Islamic Education Center of Baltimore, Parkville, MD
Michigan	Ansar Imam Mahdi Islamic Educational Services; Kerbalaa Islamic Education Center; Mosque of Imam Ali; The Fadak Foundation; Muslim Youth Connection; Islamic Institute of America
Minnesota	Anjuman-e-Asghari Jaffery Islamic Center
Missouri	Shia Islamic Education Center
Nebraska	Guidance (Al-Hedayah) Foundation
New York	Howza Ilmiyya Jami'a Wali-ul-Asr; Shahe Najaf Islamic Center; Shia Ithna-Asheri Jamaat of NY; Imam Al-Khoei Islamic Center; Islamic Institute of New York; Islamic Seminary; Tahrike Tarsile Qur'an
New Jersey	Masjid-e-Ali; Shia Association of North America; Astana-e-Zahra; Bait-ul-Qaim; Mehfile Shahe-Khorasan; Imam-a-Zamana-Foundation of North America; Muslim Foundation, Inc.; MFI Mosque Project; Message of Peace, Inc. (Pyame Aman)
Ohio	Jaffery Union of N.E. Ohio
Oregon	Islamic Center of Portland
Pennsylvania	Imamia Medics International (IMI); Mahdieh; Shia Ithna-Asheri Jamaat of PA; Imamia Organization of Pittsburgh (IOP)
Texas	Anjuman Haideri, DBA Islamic Education Center, Houston Texas; WWW.IEC-Houston.Org, Phone; Markazi ImamBargah Al Murtaza Houston, Texas; Ali Center Masjid e Ali Sugarland, Texas; IPF - Masjid AlRasool AlAkram, Houston Texas; Al Ghadeer Education Foundation, Houston, Texas; Dar-E-Abbas Ahlulbayt Center, Houston, Texas; Islamic Center of MOMIN, Dallas, Texas; IILM Shia Center, Dallas, Texas; Ahlul Bayt Student Association at The University of Texas at Dallas, Dallas, Texas; City of Knowledge Dallas, Texas; Dar e Hussain Dallas Texas; Institute of Quran and Ahlul Bayt (IQA) Dallas, Texas; Imam Ali Center Dallas, Texas; Al-Hadi School of Accelerative Learning
Virginia	Kufa Center of Islamic Knowledge (KCIK); Mohammadia Center of Virginia
Washington	Husaynia Islamic Society Of Seattle; Ithna-asheri Muslim Association of the Northwest (IMAN); Zainab (A.S.) Organization of Greater Seattle
Canada	Islamic Shia Ithna-'Asheri Jamat OF Edmonton; Shia Muslim Community of British Columbia; Organization for Young Shi'ahs; Islamic Shia Ithn'Asheri Community of London, Ontario; Shia worldwide matrimonial service; Islamic Shia Ithna-Asheri Association of Ottawa; Al-Huda Lebanese Muslim Society, Ontario; Shia-ne Haidery International Association (SHIA), Quebec
Greater Toronto Area	Masumeen Islamic Centre - Brampton Ontario; Razavi Islamic Center - Hamilton Ontario; Bab-ul-Hawaij - Mississauga, Ontario; Al-Mahdi Centre of Islamic Guidance, Pickering; Al-Huda Lebanese Muslim Society, Ontario; Masjid al-Rasool al-A'dham; Imam Ali Iranian Centre; Imam Mahdi Islamic Centre; Islamic Museum of Ontario, Masjid Husainiyah Passmore; Jaffari Community Centre

== See also ==
- Islam in the United States
- Islam in the Americas
