= Yoruba people in the Atlantic slave trade =

The Yoruba people contributed significant cultural and economic influence upon the Atlantic slave trade during its run from approximately 1400 until 1900 CE.

== Oyo Empire ==
From 1400 onward, the Oyo Empire's imperial success made the Yoruba language a lingua franca almost to the shores of the Volta. Toward the end of the 18th century, the Oyo army was neglected as there was less need to conquer. Instead, Oyo directed more effort towards trading and acted as middlemen for both the trans-Saharan and trans-Atlantic slave trades.

Europeans bringing salt first arrived in Oyo in the late 16th century, during the reign of King Obalokun. Due to its domination of the coast, Oyo merchants were able to trade with Europeans at Porto Novo and Whydah. Here, the Oyo Empire's war captives and criminals were sold as slaves to the Dutch and Portuguese. These war captives were mainly composed of Nupe and Gbe-speaking people, who had fallen victim to Oyo's war of expansion. Oyo rarely exported fellow Yoruba people, but whenever it occurred, these captives were usually hardened criminals of the empire.

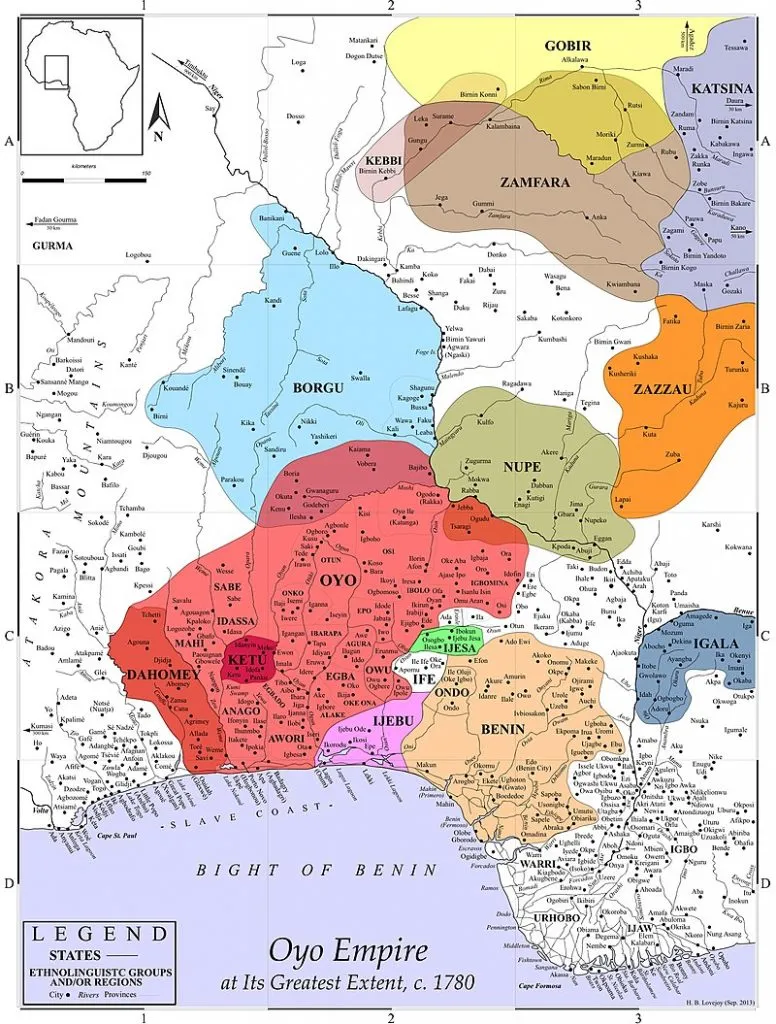
Map of the Oyo Empire.

In the late eighteenth century, Oyo came to rely too heavily on the slave trade with Europeans, so that when the trade was outlawed, Oyo suffered a loss of revenue and authority. This allowed many tributary states, such as Dahomey, to rebel and exert their own independence, at Oyo's expense. Oyo also became a target of the Fulani Jihad of 1804, which established the Sokoto Caliphate and caused frequent clashes with Oyo. This caused the Oyo Empire to fall into chaos and suffer a massive loss in territory, power, and influence. As a result, Yoruba people fell victim to slave raids of neighbouring states, like Dahomey and Sokoto. This caused a wave of Yoruba captives to enter the Atlantic Slave Trade during the first half of the nineteenth century.

== Notable Examples ==
Examples of Yoruba people trafficked into the Atlantic Slave Trade, following the collapse of the Oyo Empire, include: Sarah Forbes Bonetta (Aina), Cudjoe Lewis (Oluale Kossola), Matilda McCrear (Abake), Redoshi, Seriki Williams Abass (Ifaremilekun Fagbemi), Remigio Herrera, Samuel Ajayi Crowther, Osifekunde of Ijebu, Scipio Vaughan, and John Baptist Dasalu.

== Cultural influence ==
In addition to the influence on slavery, and later Afro-American cuisine and language, the importation of Yoruba culture was most heavily evidenced in such manifestations of Yoruba religion as Santería, and Candomblé Ketu. Other traditional spiritualities, such as Trinidad Orishas and Haitian Vodou, are also largely derived from Yoruba religion.

When Yoruba slaves began to arrive in mass to Cuba, they became distant from Arara (Dahomean) slaves, as the two groups had significant conflict in West Africa, and many had been enslaved by the other party. Thus, the Yoruba formed a culture and identity separate from the Arara. It was not until the early 1900s that the Yoruba were able to nullify their hostility with the Arara and begin syncretising their respective religions.

In Brazil, enslaved Yoruba brought not only their traditional religion, but also Islam, which many had adopted in the Oyo Empire as a result of the trans-Saharan trade and the expansion of the Sokoto Caliphate. African Muslim slaves were referred to as 'Male' in Bahia, Brazil.

This word originates from the Yoruba word 'Imale, which is used for a Yoruba Muslim. Considering that the Yoruba had a high import rate into Bahia, at the time, the Yoruba word for Muslim was used as a general term for all African Muslims, despite their ethnicity.

In Salvador, Bahia on January 1835, a number of enslaved and free Yoruba and non-Yoruba Muslims (literate in Arabic) orchestrated an uprising against the Brazilian government to end slavery and create a Black Muslim Nation. Under the inspiration of Muslim teachers and the current Muslim holiday of Ramadan, the African rebels were able to grow their number to at least 600 and take control of the streets of Salvador. However, they were outnumbered by the Brazilian authorities and possessed inferior weapons, causing their defeat. In the aftermath, about 80 rebels were killed and hundreds were captured, with many being whipped, imprisoned, and deported.
