= Nagos =

Word referring to Brazilian Yoruba people

The word Nagos refers to all Brazilian Yoruba people, their African descendants, Yoruba myth, ritual, and cosmological patterns. Nagos derives from the word anago, a term Fon-speaking people used to describe Yoruba-speaking people from the kingdom of Ketu, Toward the end of the slave trade in the 1880s, the Nagos stood out as the African group most often shipped to Brazil. The Nagos were important to the history of the slave trade at that time in the 19th century, as Brazil requested more enslaved persons as demand for products from this region grew and harsh conditions on plantations entailed a high turnover.

This particular group of Africans comprises the largest ethnic group in Brazil, with much influence since it was the most recent group to immigrate to Brazil, and Brazilian-African enslaved persons greatly helped the Brazilian economy.

High demand for labor in plantations led Brazil to import enslaved persons of the Nagos tribe. In colonial times, Brazilian enslaved persons, given their low status and poor prospects, could expect only to work until they died.

African culture, however, was passed on through religion and cultural practices, and has influenced other peoples in Brazil. The Nagos were forced to occupy the lowest status ranking in Latin America and adapted. One of the most important cultural aspects to be discovered in Brazil is the Yoruba religion. This African religion has survived since slavery, and today a large portion of Brazil's population still practices and upholds it.

== Slavery in Brazil ==
Enslaved people from Africa were cheaper than those from Europe, which may explain why the Portuguese used Africans to fuel the new economies in Latin America. The common slave received minimal respect. The understanding between master and slave had far less cost in reciprocal obligations than any other labor group in society. This created a schism or struggle for resources in social exchange. Slaves did not control their lives like the average, higher-class citizen and were distinguished from all other classes throughout societyby kinship, family, and community duties.

Some 4.8 million slaves were transported to Brazil. African people spread across the world. Heavy labor performed by slaves was the main source of wealth there. Throughout Latin America, African people helped shape the plantations and industrial communities. The African Slave Trade did not start in Latin America but was adopted in Europe in 1455 by Pope Nicholas V, who gave the right to reduce to slavery inhabitants of the southern coast of Africa who resisted Christianity. The Portuguese created a slave trade in West Africa, exporting slaves to Iberian cities such as Seville and Lisbon. African slavery had a steady but limited demand in Europe. Indigenous Brazilian people could not meet the plantation economy's demand for labor so the labor force swelled with the importation of West African slaves.

Enslaved persons were victims of the demand for their physical strength and endurance to perform tasks in extreme climates. An average slave had limited social mobility. enslaved persons fought their masters in many ways: through suicide, escape, sabotage, and defiance of laws and social or religious norms. Practicing their own culture in a self-preserving way helped them to adapt to the new social and cultural order. Enslaved persons were not free to roam around in Latin America but enforcement of marriage and other laws depended on regional and local considerations.

As a means of combating the oppression of slavery, Africans did their best to preserve their native cultures. For example, in the Republic of Palmares, Afro-Brazilians who escaped from slavery formed a settlement of about 20,000 black people who were governed by West African customs and cultural elements taken from the Portuguese slave society from which they had fled.

== Mixing ==
African culture had to adapt to new challenges in the New World. As minorities with no social power, they needed help from any source. Miscegenation or commingling of races was a direct effect of colonization in Brazil and wider Latin America, and created a mixed people and new mestizaje culture. The Portuguese called the children of Africans and native people cafuzos.

Extensive mixing forced Spanish authority to create a legal category for this new racial group that now dominated many areas of Latin America, who they called Zambos. Mexico also saw the mixing of Africans and natives, and outlawed interracial marriages. In addition, the Portuguese and Spanish colonial authorities often promoted miscegenation as a population policy in underpopulated regions. The effect of slavery on Afro-Brazilian society is similar to that on blacks in post-slavery North America.

As a result, a caste system based on color emerged; blacks occupied the lowest economic class. Africans experienced racism and oppression in their attempts to climb the social ladder. Reforms and social movements for rights throughout the nineteenth and twentieth centuries paved the way for Africans in Latin America.

According to social scientists, policymakers, and activists, Brazil's essential nature is to be a mixed-race country. In addition, black movements in Brazil during the 1990s resulted in great change in the 21st century through affirmative action policies in governmental spheres throughout Brazil.

== Yoruba religion ==
Yoruba ritual practices include singing, dancing, drumming, spirit possession, ritual healing, respect for ancestors, and divination. Yoruba religion is a ritual negotiation with the spirits of the Dead. The Yoruba religion stems from western Nigeria, which is where the Nagos people originated from and also where the Yoruba religion mixed with Christian practices.
