= Brazilian Yoruba =

Ethnic group in Brazil of Yoruba origin

The Brazilian Yoruba are descendants of the Yoruba people of West Africa, primarily from present-day Nigeria and Benin, who were brought to Brazil through the transatlantic slave trade between the 16th and 19th centuries. Today, their cultural, religious, and linguistic heritage remains influential in various aspects of Brazilian society, especially in the northeast region, notably in the state of Bahia.

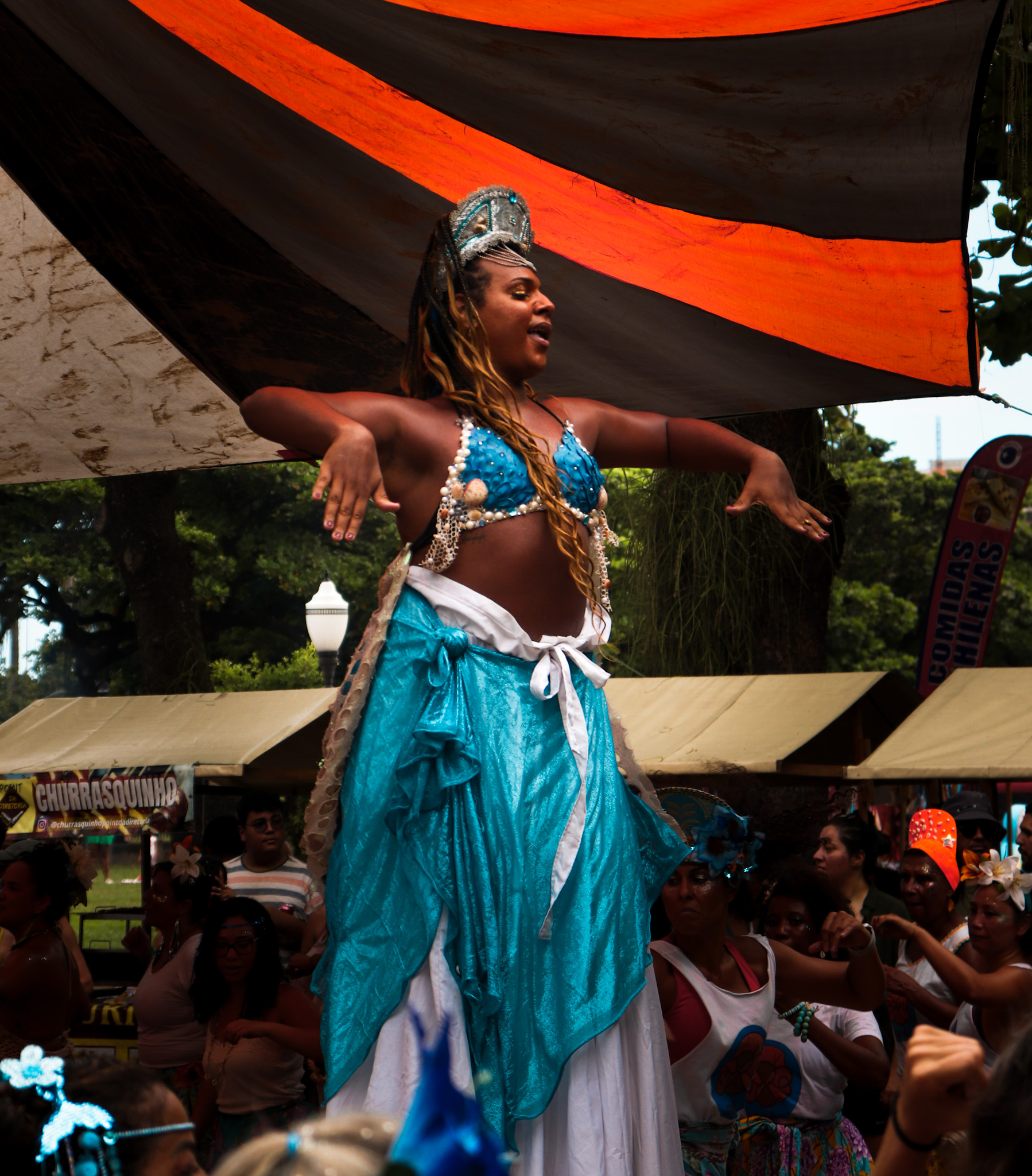
Brazilian Yoruba dancer

== History ==
The Yoruba people constituted one of the African ethnic groups enslaved and transported to Brazil during the transatlantic slave trade. Many arrived in Brazil following the collapse of the Oyo Empire in the early 19th century, after a period of internal conflicts and invasions that led to mass enslavement and exportation of Yoruba captives.

In Brazil, the Yoruba and their descendants contributed significantly to the cultural and religious landscape, retaining many elements of their traditions while adapting to the new environment and conditions of slavery. Large communities of Yoruba descendants were formed in urban centers, particularly in Salvador, Bahia, where they played key roles in shaping Afro-Brazilian identity. Many other enslaved african ethnic groups also joined in with the Yorubas due to the organisation of the culture and religion.

== Religion and culture ==
One of the most enduring legacies of the Brazilian Yoruba is the practice of Candomblé, a syncretic religion that preserves many elements of the Yoruba religious system. Candomblé revolves around the worship of orixás (deities), which correspond to Yoruba gods and goddesses, and integrates music, dance, and ritual practices that have deep roots in Yoruba traditions.

The religion developed as a form of resistance and cultural preservation among enslaved Africans and their descendants, providing a spiritual system through which Yoruba cosmology and identity could be maintained. Today, Candomblé remains a vital expression of Afro-Brazilian heritage and has garnered both national and international scholarly interest.

Cultural practices associated with the Brazilian Yoruba also include festivals, drumming traditions, culinary influences, and the use of Yoruba-derived names and language in ritual contexts.

== Legacy ==
The Brazilian Yoruba have played a significant role in the formation of Afro-Brazilian identity. Through religion, art, music, and social institutions, they have preserved and adapted Yoruba traditions, contributing to Brazil's multicultural fabric. Their legacy is most visible in Bahia, but Yoruba influence can be seen throughout Brazil, in both popular culture and academic discourse.
