= Oluewu =

Alaafin (emperor) of the Oyo empire

- Aláàfin ti Ọ̀yọ́; Ikú Bàbá Yèyé

Alaafin of Oyo
- Reign: 1833-1835
- Predecessor: Amodo
- Successor: Atiba Atobatele
- Died: 1835; Ilorin
- House: Oranyan

Oluewu was the Alaafin (emperor) of the Oyo empire in northwestern Yorubaland, West Africa, from 1833-1835. He attempted to re-establish Oyo's predominance in the region, but his decisive defeat and death at the Battle of Ilorin in 1835 instead marked the end of Oyo's imperial period.

== Reign ==
Tall and handsome, Oluewu was the son of the earlier Alaafin Awole. Upon his accession to the throne in 1833 Oluewu was determined to restore the glory of the Oyo Empire, much diminished since the rebellions and wars of the 1810s and 1820s. In particular, his target was the city of Ilorin, where a Fula-led Islamic emirate had taken root and grown to become the most powerful state in the region.

The Emir of Ilorin 'invited' Oluewu to come and pay homage to him, but stole the royal drum when he tried to leave. A second invitation was refused; instead, Oluewu began to raise troops and turn Yoruba towns away from their new master and back to their traditional loyalty to Oyo. He also built an alliance with Borgu.

The campaign started well. The Borgawa archers dislodged the Ilorin army besieging the small town of Gbodo, and many of the Ilorin cavalry drowned in flooded streams while fleeing the battlefield. When the Alaafin's army attacked Ilorin city, they nearly routed the defenders. But in the second day of fighting, one wing of the allied force collapsed, and Oluewu was surrounded. His eldest son galloped up to his father, saluted him goodbye, and plunged into the thick of the battle. Both father and son died on the battlefield, marking the final collapse of the Oyo Empire.
