= Battle of Ogele =

Battle between the Ilorin Emirate and the Oyo Empire

- Part of the Yoruba Wars
Date	1825
Location	Ogele (modern day Asa, Kwara State) 8°30′N 5°00′E
Result	Decisive Sokoto Caliphate / Fula victory

Belligerents
Ilorin Emirate, supported by the Sokoto Caliphate	Oyo Empire, allied with the Nupe

Commanders and leaders
Shehu Alimi; Solagberu	Baale Toyeje of Ogbomosho

Casualties and losses
Minor	Heavy

The Battle of Ogele was a battle between the Ilorin Emirate of the Sokoto Caliphate and the Yoruba Oyo Empire in modern day Ogele. This battle was narrated and written down by the accredited Yoruba historian, Samuel Johnson in the book The History of the Yorubas.

== Background ==
Following the death of the Kakanfo Afonja, the Yorubas united to expel the Fulas from Ilorin. Afonja had been unable to control the Jamaa, and they revolted in early 1824. A massive mob besieged Afonja's compound, and although he fought valiantly, he was eventually killed by arrows and spears. Shehu Alimi then took over as head of Ilorin. The Alaafin of the Oyo Empire, Majotu, made a coalition with the Nupe to expel the Muslims from Ilorin.

== Battle ==
Toyeje, the Baale of Ogbomoso, became Kankanfo and led the coalition to drive out the foreigners. They encamped at a place called Ogele, where they were met by the Fula forces aided by the Yoruba Muslim chief Solagberu of Oke Suna. A battle was fought in which the Fulas were victorious due to their larger cavalry force. They routed Toyeje's forces and followed up their victory, sacking many towns as they pursued the survivors.

== Aftermath ==
The only important towns left in that part were Ofa, Igbomina, Ilemona, Erin and a few others. Refugees fled to walled towns, where they found temporary refuge. Many aged people who could not flee were left behind, and the distress caused by the calamity was severe. Thousands of refugees were forced to move south. The defeat seriously weakened Oyo's prestige, and pushed many provincial governors to start looking more to their personal interests than the interests of the empire as a whole.

== See also ==
- Battle of ilorin
- Battle of Pamo
- Mugbamugba War
- Sack of Old Oyo
