= Yoruba Wars =

Conflicts in West Africa (c. 1789–1893)

The Yoruba Wars, also known as the Yoruba Civil Wars, were a series of conflicts that engulfed the Yoruba-speaking areas of West Africa from approximately 1789 to 1893. These wars were characterized by intense and prolonged struggles among various Yoruba city-states and kingdoms, leading to significant political, social, and economic changes in the region.

== Background ==
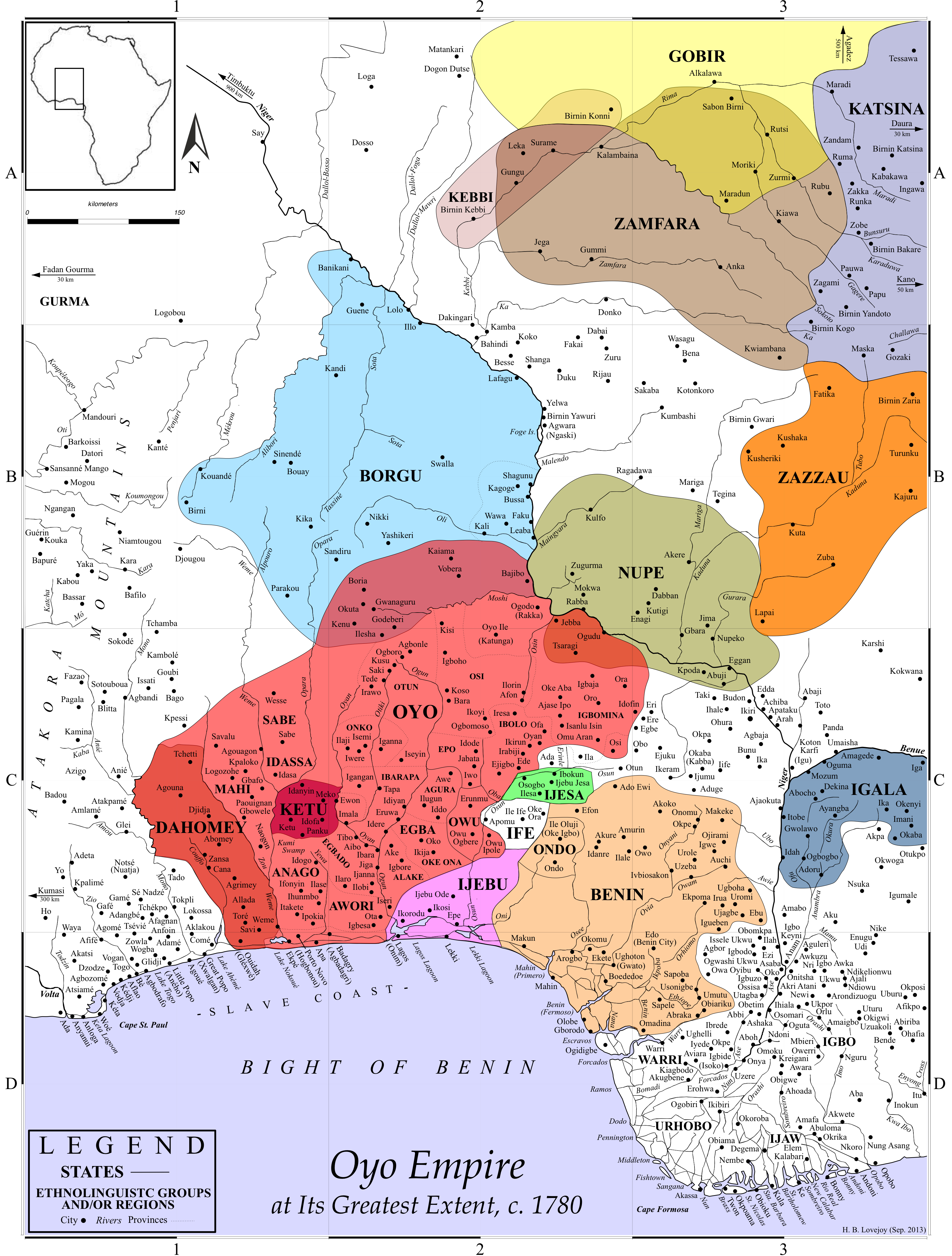
The Oyo Empire at its height

In 1754 Basorun Gaha, head of the Oyo Mesi, overthrew Alaafin Labisi. Gaha ruled behind the scenes for the next 20 years, severely weakening the Oyo Empire's prestige and ability to respond to rising threats, in particular ongoing Nupe raids. Although Basorun Gaha was defeated in 1774 by a coalition of Oyo-Ile chiefs, provincial chiefs and Abiodun (at the time an Oyo prince), there was dissatisfaction in the way Oyo administered its territories.

Alaafin Abiodun ruled the empire in an uneasy peace from 1774 until his death in 1789. According to oral tradition, this period saw further expansion and decentralization of authority. It was also during Abiodun's reign that the law prohibiting the bearers of the Abaja tribal mark, from being enslaved, was enacted. This law severely affected the livelihood of the provincial chiefs and some members of the Oyo imperial family. It also led to the sourcing of Muslim slaves from Northern Hausa, Bariba and Nupe towns; some of these slaves were then exported to Europe and the Americas via the Port of Ajase.

Abiodun's rule was generally peaceful, but he was unable to resolve the deep-seated issues plaguing the Oyo Empire. Kaiama broke away in 1783, and Abiodun's attempt to re-establish central control was decisively defeated. In 1789 Awole was elected as Alaafin to replace Abiodun, narrowly beating out another challenger, Afonja. He had inherited a militarily weakened empire, but his blasphemous, paranoid, and incompetent rule further intensified divisions among Oyo leaders.

He appointed Afonja to the title of Are-Ona Kakanfo in 1789 or 1790. The Kakanfo was the empire's supreme military commander, but was banned from coming to the capital, and so this neutralized his political threat. In 1796 he sent the Kakanfo to Iwere and, once on site, commanded him to take the impregnable city, hoping that he would fail and would be disgraced. Afonja refused to comply and marched the on Oyo-Ile instead, overthrowing Awole. Afonja did not manage to take the crown, however, and a series of weak rulers followed, with several provinces breaking away. Afonja was among the rebellious leaders, as his fief Ilorin declared independence in 1801. He soon established himself as the preeminent military power in Yorubaland.

== Afonja and Ilorin ==
The 1804 outbreak of the Sokoto Jihad spooked the leaders of Yorubaland, who increasingly began persecuting local Muslims. Seeing an opportunity, in 1817 Afonja announced that Ilorin would be a haven for any Muslim or escaped slave, and recruited them into a paramilitary force called the 'Jamaa'. Consolidating nearby villages into Ilorin and drawing support from Solagberu and the Muslim teacher Shehu Alimi, Afonja began conquering peripheral provinces of Oyo. The growing power of the Jamaa and Shehu Alimi, their leader, eventually proved his undoing, however. In early 1824 Afonja attempted to curb their power, but they revolted and killed him.

Afonja's death meant the establishment of a full-blown Islamic emirate under the rule of a Fula cleric in the heart of Yorubaland, and this prompted a nationalistic reaction. Toyeje, the Baale of Ogbomosho, became Kankanfo and put together a coalition to drive out the foreigners. But at the decisive Battle of Ogele in 1825, the Fula cavalry routed the Yoruba. The victorious Fulas sacked many towns as they pursued the survivors, forcing thousands of refugees to flee south. This defeat severely weakened Oyo's prestige and pushed provincial governors to prioritize their own interests over the empire.

== Ilorin vs. Oyo ==
The Mugbamugba War was the second Yoruba attempt to expel the Muslims and recover Ilorin, following the death of Shehu Alimi and the assumption of power by his son Abdulsalami as Emir. Another coalition was formed with the Nupe ruler Majiya II, but the devastation of previous wars meant there were no farms or food, so the conflict became known as the Mugbamugba War, after the locust beans that the soldiers subsisted on. With poor coordination between the Obas, the allies struggled to contend with the Fulas' expertise in cavalry warfare, and were subjected to long sieges within walled towns, eroding morale. After a decisive defeat where the Fula cavalry encircled and destroyed the allies' army, Majiya retreated to Nupeland and the victorious Ilorin forces swept through the areas of Offa, Erin, Igbona, among others.

== Effects ==
All of these quarrels weakened central authority and gave rise to regional autonomy. They vastly affected the sociopolitical landscape of the Yoruba country and expanded the scope of the slave trade in the 19th century. Some of the victims of these wars became Christian converts in Sierra Leone. The most notable effect was the creation of new states; Ibadan, Abeokuta and Ijaye. It also saw the rise and fall of some of the most influential figures in Yoruba history; Kurunmi in Ijaye, Basorun Oluyole, Aare Latoosa, Efunsetan Aniwura and Balogun Ogunmola in Ibadan, Biodun Fabunmi in Ekiti, Ogedengbe of Ilesa, Efunroye Tinubu, Kosoko in Lagos, Arilekolasi in Ondo and many more. It also severely weakened Oyo suzerainty over the area, eventually paving the way for British annexation in the late 1800s under the guise of ending the slave trade.
