= Sack of Old Oyo =

1830s attack on a city in West Africa

Sack of Katunga or Old Oyo
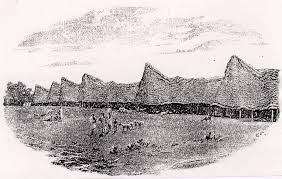
Date	1830s
Location	Oyo 8°00′N 4°00′E
Result	Decisive Sokoto Caliphate victory
Territorial changes	Abandonment of Oyo Empire Capital City Beginning of Fula settlements in Southwest Nigeria

Belligerents
Sokoto Caliphate Ilorin Emirate	Oyo Empire Yoruba Alliance

Strength
Unknown	Unknown

Casualties and losses
Unknown	Unknown

The Sack of Old Oyo, also known as the Sack of Katunga, refers to the destruction and abandonment of Old Oyo, also known as Katungawhich was the capital and largest city of the Oyo Empire, in the 1830s, during the period of the Fula jihads in West Africa.

The event was a turning point between the Ilorin Emirate and its ally the Sokoto Caliphate and the Yoruba Oyo Empire in modern-day Oyo, Nigeria.

== Aftermath ==
After the sack of Katunga, the capital of Oyo. The Oyo royal family and many nobles fled southward. They relocated and established a new capital at Ago d'Oyo (New Oyo), retreating from their original power base in the north. This move marked the end of the Old Oyo Empire.

Katunga and its surrounding territories were abandoned, and the area became a no-man's-land, exposed to slave raids and pressure from Fula and Nupe forces. It did not immediately become a core Fula outpost. Ilorin—under Fula leadership—gained control of former Oyo territories in the north. Ilorin was once a Yoruba town, but after Afonja (a rebel Yoruba warlord) invited Fula help and was eventually killed, Shehu Alimi's descendants took over, establishing Ilorin as a Fula emirate. Ilorin became a tributary of the Sokoto Caliphate and was governed under Sokoto's spiritual and political authority.

This incident led to the collapse of central authority and the rise of smaller, rival Yoruba states. This power vacuum triggered widespread instability, with increased Fulani raids from the north and internal conflicts among Yoruba polities vying for dominance. All the towns showing "any allegiance to Oyo, and hence Gbodo" were besieged. Following the collapse of Oyo, Fulani forces from Ilorin and Nupe raided the northern Yoruba lands. The disintegration of Oyo’s central power created numerous smaller Yoruba states, such as Ibadan, Ijaye, Abeokuta, and Ilesa, which competed for supremacy.This period was characterized by civil wars, slave raids, and constant instability until the British colonial intervention in the late 19th century.

== See also ==
- Battle of Ilorin
- Mugbmugba War
- Battle of Ogele
- Battle of Pamo
