= Fall of Ilorin =

Capture of the city Ilorin in 1897

- Part of the Royal Niger Company's Niger Sudan Campaign
Date	13–18 February 1897
Location	Ilorin, Ilorin Emirate
Result	Royal Niger Company victory

Belligerents
Royal Niger Company	Ilorin Emirate

Commanders and leaders
Sir George Taubman Goldie; Major A. J. Arnold	Emir Suleiman of Ilorin

Strength
Approximately 500 troops Artillery; Maxim guns	Approximately 5,000 troops including about 800 cavalry

Casualties and losses
1 officer and 3 men wounded	Unknown

The Fall of Ilorin was the capture of the city of Ilorin, capital of the Ilorin Emirate, by the Royal Niger Company in February 1897. The operation formed the second major phase of the Company's Niger Sudan Campaign of 1897, following the defeat and occupation of Bida in January.

The Royal Niger Company force, commanded by Major A. J. Arnold under the overall direction of Sir George Taubman Goldie, advanced from Bida towards Ilorin after defeating the Nupe army. An attempt was initially made to avoid a direct confrontation with the Ilorin government, but fighting broke out after the Company's troops were attacked by an Ilorin force estimated by contemporary British accounts at approximately 5,000 men, including about 800 mounted troops.

The Company's artillery and Maxim guns again proved decisive. Ilorin was occupied on 16 February, after which Emir Suleiman and his leading commanders withdrew from the city. The emir subsequently surrendered and signed a treaty with the Royal Niger Company on 18 February, recognising Company authority while retaining his position as emir.

== Background ==
Ilorin had developed into a major political and commercial centre in the nineteenth century. Its position between the northern territories of the Sokoto Caliphate and the Yoruba states to the south gave it considerable strategic and commercial importance.

During the 1890s the political situation in Ilorin became increasingly unstable. Emir Momo sought accommodation with British interests, while influential military leaders opposed concessions to the British. The internal struggle culminated in Momo's death in 1895 and the accession of Suleiman, whose position was strongly influenced by the military leaders who had opposed Momo.

At the same time, the Royal Niger Company was extending its military and political influence eastwards from its headquarters at Lokoja. The Company's conquest of Bida in January 1897 created a direct opportunity to advance upon Ilorin.

Goldie's wider objective was to prevent the political and military forces of Bida and Ilorin from combining against the Company. During the Bida campaign he had deliberately positioned his forces between the two states and used the Company's river flotilla to restrict communication across the Niger River.

== Advance from Bida ==
Following the capture of Bida, the Royal Niger Company prepared to move against Ilorin. Equipment and troops not required for the Ilorin operation were returned towards Lokoja, while the expeditionary force assembled for the advance up the Niger.

The Ilorin expeditionary force embarked at Egbon on 6 February 1897. The force travelled by river aboard vessels of the Royal Niger Company's flotilla, proceeding towards Jebba.

The flotilla reached the Company's station at Jebba on 8 February. From there the expedition proceeded towards Ilorin, while Goldie and the Company's officers attempted to establish whether the emirate would submit without fighting.

== Battle ==
The Royal Niger Company initially attempted to negotiate with the Ilorin authorities. Emir Suleiman was prepared to communicate with Goldie, but influential members of the Ilorin military leadership opposed an agreement with the Company.

The situation deteriorated when an Ilorin force attacked the Company's troops. Contemporary accounts estimated the attacking force at approximately 5,000 men, including about 800 mounted troops.

As at Bida, the Royal Niger Company's artillery and Maxim guns gave its relatively small force a substantial tactical advantage. Concentrated fire broke up the Ilorin attack and enabled the Company troops to advance towards the city.

The Company's troops reached Ilorin and subjected the emir's palace and associated positions to artillery fire. The Fulani quarter of the city was also attacked during the fighting.

The Ilorin forces were unable to resist the Company's advance. The emir and leading military commanders withdrew from the city, leaving the Company in control of the capital.

== Occupation of Ilorin ==
Ilorin was occupied by the Royal Niger Company on 16 February 1897. The Company's victory followed the defeat of the Ilorin military force and the withdrawal of the emir and his commanders.

The Company's casualties were comparatively light. A contemporary summary of the expedition recorded one officer and three men wounded during the fighting at Ilorin.

The occupation did not result in the immediate abolition of the Ilorin Emirate. Instead, Goldie sought to secure the submission of the emir and establish Company authority through a treaty.

== Treaty with Emir Suleiman ==
After the occupation, Emir Suleiman returned and entered negotiations with Goldie. A treaty was concluded on 18 February 1897 between Sir George Goldie, Governor of the Royal Niger Company, and Emir Suleiman on behalf of himself and his subjects.

Under the settlement, the Royal Niger Company recognised Suleiman as emir while he acknowledged the Company's authority. The arrangement effectively transformed the Ilorin Emirate into a protected subordinate polity under Royal Niger Company influence.

The treaty did not result in the immediate replacement of the emirate's existing political institutions. Instead, the Company relied upon the emir and local political structures to administer the territory while asserting ultimate authority over external relations and political affairs.

== Consequences ==
The fall of Ilorin strengthened the Royal Niger Company's position in the region between the Niger and the Yoruba states. Together with the capture of Bida, the campaign demonstrated that the Company's military forces could defeat much larger African armies through the combination of disciplined infantry, artillery and Maxim guns.

The conquest also affected Ilorin's economic position. Ilorin had previously exercised considerable control over trade passing between northern and southern regions. British intervention weakened the emirate's ability to regulate this trade and subsequently altered the economic position of the city.

The occupation was accompanied by substantial social disruption. According to Ann O'Hear, the defeat of Ilorin was followed by the flight of numerous enslaved people from the city and surrounding areas, including Hausa and other northern populations.

Despite its military victory, the Royal Niger Company did not establish a fully developed permanent colonial administration in Ilorin. The Company retained political influence until its charter was surrendered at the end of 1899, when the British government assumed direct responsibility for its territories.

Ilorin subsequently became part of the Northern Nigeria Protectorate. The emirate itself survived as a subordinate traditional authority within the British colonial system.

== Historical significance ==
The fall of Ilorin represented one of the decisive military successes of the Royal Niger Company during its final years as a chartered company. The simultaneous defeat of Bida and Ilorin in 1897 removed two major centres of military resistance to the Company's expansion along the middle Niger and its approaches to the Yoruba country.

The campaign also demonstrated the limitations of Company conquest. Although the Royal Niger Company could defeat the Ilorin army and impose a treaty, the Company's political authority remained dependent upon the cooperation of the emirate's existing rulers and was ultimately superseded by direct British administration after the termination of the Company's charter.

Contemporary British accounts presented the campaign partly as an operation against the slave trade and against political authorities regarded by the Company as hostile to British commercial interests. Modern historians have also emphasised the commercial importance of Ilorin, the Company's strategic objectives and the wider Anglo-French competition for territory in West Africa.

== Contemporary accounts and maps ==
A principal contemporary account of the campaign is Seymour Vandeleur's Campaigning on the Upper Nile and Niger, published in 1898. Vandeleur participated in the Royal Niger Company's campaigns and described the advance from Bida to Ilorin and the subsequent occupation of the city.

A contemporary plan of Ilorin was published by Vandeleur in the Geographical Journal in October 1897. The plan depicts the city and its principal features and is an important contemporary cartographic source for the campaign.

== See also ==
- Royal Niger Company
- George Goldie
- Seymour Vandeleur
- Bida expedition (1897)
- Ilorin Emirate
- Nupe Kingdom
- Sokoto Caliphate
- Northern Nigeria Protectorate
- Scramble for Africa
