= Awole Arogangan =

Emperor of Oyo in West Africa

Awole
- Aláàfin ti Ọ̀yọ́; Ikú Bàbá Yèyé

Alaafin of Oyo
- Reign: 1789-1796
- Predecessor: Abiodun
- Successor: Adebo
- Died: 1796; Oyo-Ile
- House: Oranyan

Awole Arogangan, sometimes spelled Aólè, was the Alaafin (emperor) of the Oyo empire in northwestern Yorubaland, West Africa, from 1789-1796. His paranoid, vindictive reign set the stage for the collapse of the empire in the early 19th century.

== Early life ==
As a prince, Awole was active in the Atlantic slave trade. At one point he attempted to illegally sell a friend of his into slavery, but was stopped and punished by the Baale of Apomu, the town where the crime had taken place.

== Reign ==
In 1789 Awole was elected as Alaafin, replacing Abiodun whose reign was noted for its peace and prosperity. He narrowly beat out another challenger, Afonja. He had inherited a militarily weakened empire, but his reign further intensified divisions among Oyo leaders.

In 1793 he sought revenge on the Baale of Apomu, who fled to his sovereign the Ooni of Ife. Although Ife was militarily much weaker than Oyo, as the spiritual center of the Yoruba people it was sacrosanct. The Baale eventually committed suicide rather than risk war, but Awole's blasphemous move against sacred Ife significantly damaged the Alaafin's prestige, and showed him to be an oath-breaker. He invaded the Nupe lands, but was defeated. This, his general inept rule, and his penchant for blasphemy and cursing alienated his most important ministers.

Awole appointed his onetime rival Afonja to the title of Are-Ona Kakanfo in 1789 or 1790. The Kakanfo was the empire's supreme military commander, but was banned from coming to the capital, and so this neutralized his political threat. This was not enough, however. He sent the Kakanfo and the army to Iwere and, once on site, commanded them to attack it, hoping that Afonja would fail to take the well-defended city and would be disgraced.

Afonja refused to comply and marched the army on Oyo-Ile. Awole eventually committed ritual suicide.
