= Abdulsalami =

Abdusalami dan Salih Alimi
- Emir of Ilorin
- Reign: 1820-1842
- Predecessor: Foundation of the Emirate
- Successor: Shita dan Salih Alimi
- Died: 1842
- House: Abdulsalami
- Father: Shehu Alimi

Abdusalami dan Salih Alimi was the first Emir of Ilorin, reigning from the official establishment of the emirate in 1820 to his death in 1842. He founded the state after the death of his father Shehu Alimi, and led Ilorin against various Yoruba attempts to retake the city, particularly the Mugbamugba War. He pledged allegiance to the Sokoto Caliphate in 1823. After destroying the Oyo Empire at the 1835 Battle of Ilorin, Abdulsalami launched a jihad toward the sea but was ultimately stopped at the Battle of Òsogbo in 1840 by the army of Ibadan.
