= Battle of Ilorin =

1830s battle in modern-day Nigeria

Date	c. 1835
Location	Ilorin (modern day Kwara State, Nigeria) 8°30′N 4°33′E
Result	Decisive Sokoto Caliphate / Fula and Ilorin victory

Belligerents
Oyo Empire; Borgu	Ilorin Emirate; Sokoto Caliphate; Gwandu Emirate

Commanders and leaders
Oluewu (Alaafin of Oyo) †; Sero Kpera (King of Nikki) †; Gajere (Wasangari of Bussa)	Abdulsalami; Solagberu; Muhammad Bukhari; Muhammad Sambo

Casualties and losses
Heavy	Minor

The Battle of Ilorin, sometimes called the Eleduwe War, occurred during the 1830s as part of the Yoruba Wars. The Ilorin Emirate's decisive victory over the invading Oyo Empire, and the death of the Alaafin Oluewu, marked the final collapse of the Oyo state.

== Background ==
The Oyo Empire had been the hegemonic power over much of Yorubaland since the 17th century, but by the 1820s had been severely weakened by rebellion. In particular, the city of Ilorin, an Islamic Emirate pledging loyalty to the Sokoto Caliphate, had become the strongest city in the region. Oluewu, Alaafin of Oyo, was not willing to give up his country's historical position, however. Invited to pay homage to the Emir, he refused, and went about raising troops from former Oyo vassals and forming a military alliance with Borgu to march on Ilorin.

== Forces ==
Leading the Borgu forces were Sero Kpera, king of Nikki; Ki-Yaru Doride, the king of Kaiama; and Gajere or JikiMasa, representing the king of Bussa. Other commanders of the Borgawa contingent included: Akpaki Timkpoko (Chief of Parakou), Asabaru (Wasangari of Ilesha), Bio Damira (Wasangari of Bussa), Bio Kura (Wasangari of Gbodebere), Bum Gumurumaro (Wasangari of Darakou), the chief of Ilio, Dafia Sorou (Chief of Kouande), Dagwara (Wasangari of Ilesha), Ki-Yoma (Chief of Gwette), Koto Gbodokpunon (Chief of Okuta), Magai Kabe (Prince of Wawa), Mora Lafia (Chief of Ilesha), Sonni ali (Chief of Gwanara), and Yoru Yerima (Wasangari of Nikki).

The Ilorin forces dramatically outnumbered the Alaafin's army. Emir Abdussalami was reinforced by contingents from Gwandu and the Sokoto Caliphate.

== Battle ==
Despite being outnumbered, in the first day of fighting the Oyo-Borgu alliance was able to push the Ilorin army back to the city. A complete rout was only averted by a cavalry counter-attack.

The battle the next day, however, exposed the internal divisions within the Oyo army. Many of the commanders did not trust the Alaafin or his Borgawa allies. Early in the second day of battle, the Ilorin cavalry launched another successful assault, turning one flank of the invading army and striking the heart of the Oyo force in the rear. Sero Kpera, king of Nikki and leader of the Borgu army, was killed, and his death devastated the army's morale. Ultimately, Alaafin Oluewu, his eldest son, and the leaders of both Wawa and Kaiama died fighting.

== Aftermath ==
Ilorin became a major slave trading hub after this. Richard Henry Stone that spent six years in Yorubland documented how wide-spread and common slavery was.

“Ilorin boasted the largest slave market in that part of Africa. The Yorubans who lived in the town as subjects of the Emir were mostly Pagans and had little social intercourse with their haughty masters, and they were secretly cherishing at that time a burning desire to free themselves from the Foolah yoke”.

When news of the calamity reached Oyo-Ile, capital of the empire, the population understood the repercussions. Nearly all of them packed their bags and fled the city, leaving it abandoned.

== See also ==
- Mugbamugba War
- Battle of Ogele
- Battle of Pamo
- Sack of Old Oyo
