= University of Agriculture, Makurdi =

Public university in Makurdi, Nigeria

Joseph Sarwuan Tarka University (JoSTUM), formally University of Agriculture, Makurdi
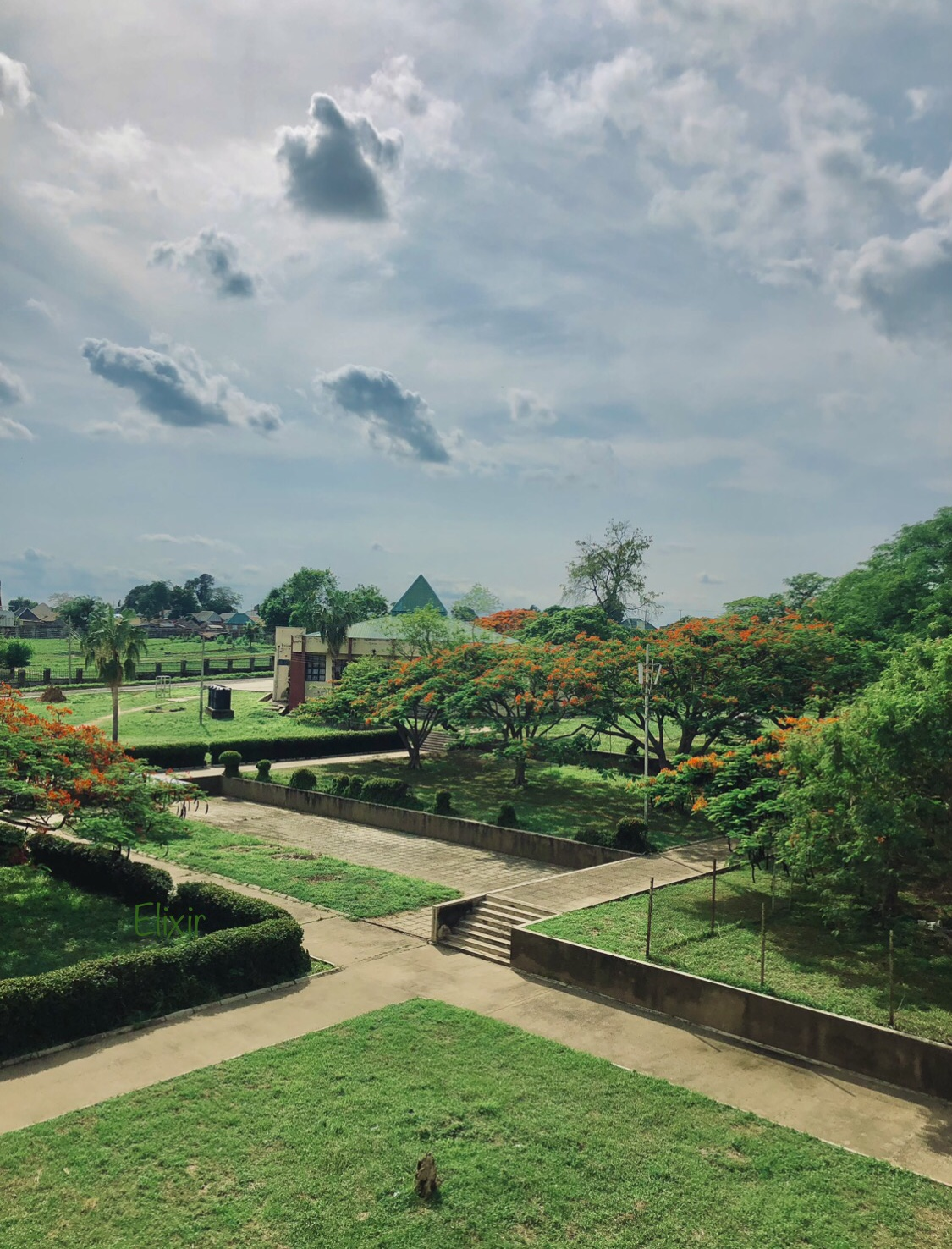
- Motto: Innovation and Service
- Type: Public
- Established: 1988; 38 years ago
- Chancellor: Alhaji Ibrahim Sulu Gambari (Emir of Ilorin)
- Vice-Chancellor: Professor Isaac Nathaniel Itodo
- Location: Makurdi, Benue State, Nigeria; 7°43′55.8714″N 8°32′20.9306″E
- Campus: Urban
- Website: uam.edu.ng

The Federal University of Agriculture, Makurdi (UAM) now renamed Joseph Sarwuan Tarka University in 2019, is a higher education institution in Makurdi, Benue State, Nigeria.

The university was established in 1988, following the recommendations of a 1987 Federal Government White Paper on Higher Education Curriculum and Development in Nigeria. The vice-chancellor is Professor Isaac Nathaniel Itodo , and the chancellor is the Emir of Ilorin, Alhaji Ibrahim Sulu Gambari CFR. On 14 July 2019, President Muhammadu Buhari approved a bill to rename the university Joseph Sarwuan Tarka University in honour of the late Nigerian politician Joseph Sarwuam Tarka.

== Faculties ==
The University of Agriculture, Makurdi has over 30 departments in eleven colleges:

College of Agronomy

- Crop Production
- Crop & Environmental Protection
- Plant Breeding & Seed Science
- Soil Science

College of Animal Science

- Animal Production
- Animal Nutrition
- Animal Breeding & Physiology

College of Agricultural Economics & Extension

- Agricultural Economics
- Agricultural Extension & Rural Development (Communication/Management)

College of Agricultural & Science Education

- Agricultural Education
- Biology Education
- Chemistry Education
- Integrated Science Education
- Physics Education
- Mathematics/Computer Science Education
- Mathematics/Statistics Education
- Statistics/Computer Science Education
- Educational Foundations & General Studies.

College of Engineering

- Agricultural & Environmental Engineering
- Civil Engineering
- Electrical/Electronics Engineering
- Mechanical Engineering.

College of Forestry & Fisheries

- Social & Environmental Forestry
- Forestry Production & Products
- Wildlife & Range Management
- Fisheries & Aquaculture
- General Forestry / Forestry & Wildlife Management

College of Food Technology & Human Ecology

- Food Science & Technology
- Home Science Management
- Nutrition & Dietetics.

College of Science

- Botany
- Microbiology
- Zoology
- Chemistry
- Biochemistry
- Physics (including Industrial Physics)
- Mathematics
- Statistics
- Computer Science

College of Veterinary Medicine

- Doctor of Veterinary Medicine (DVM)
- Including specialties like Veterinary Anatomy, Pathology & Microbiology, Public Health & Preventive Medicine, Surgery & Theriogenology.
- Agribusiness
- Business Administration
- Accounting & Finance
- Banking & Finance
- Marketing
- Public Administration
- Entrepreneurship
- Procurement Management
- Agricultural Management

Other Courses

- Accounting
- Business Education
- Education & Biology / Chemistry / Integrated Science / Physics
- Educational Administration & Planning
- Electrical/Electronics Engineering
- Environmental Education / Environmental Sustainability
- Fisheries & Aquaculture
- Forestry & Wildlife Management
- History & Archaeology
- Home Science & Management
- Industrial Technical Education
- Library & Information Science
- Mechanical Engineering
- Procurement Management
- Public Administration
- Sustainable Social Development
- Veterinary Medicine
- Zoology.

Postgraduate degrees, including:

- PGD, M.S.C, M.Phil. Ph.D. in fields like Crop Science, Soil Science, Agricultural Education, Agricultural Economics, Animal Science, Biochemistry, Microbiology, Chemistry, Physics, Engineering disciplines, Veterinary Medicine, and Management Sciences

For outreach and public service support, UAM has established a Co-operative Extension Centre (CEC) and a Centre for Food and Agricultural Strategy (CEFAS) which focus on practical agricultural extension liaison support and public policy support services, respectively.

== Research and extension programmes ==
- Root and Tubers programme
- Cereals and Legumes programme
- Forestry and Horticulture programme
- Ruminants programme
- Non-ruminants programme
- Farming systems programme
- Socio-economics programme
- Rural infrastructures programme
- Agricultural Mechanization programme
- Environmental and Analytical Studies programme and Food Processing and Utilization programme.

The Cooperative Extension Centre through its training and extension liaison services coordinates the outreach programmes. The Centre for Food and Agricultural Strategy coordinates the public service support in food and agriculture. UAM is forming links to ensure that agricultural technologies and the output of its research reach average small-scale Nigerian farmers, the intended beneficiaries of the university's research and extension programmes.

Institutional links are being forged with federal and state Ministries of Agriculture and other related agencies to identify areas of collaboration and technical support from the University. The university has been involved with the International Institute of Tropical Agriculture in research on the socio-economic aspects of soybean production. The university is making its presence felt in Benue State through such collaborative programme and protects. Training programmes are being conducted for participants from other states.

== See also ==
- Academic libraries in Nigeria
