= Ibrahim Sulu-Gambari =

Emir of Illorin

Ibrahim Kolapo Sulu-Gambari, CFR

Emir of Ilorin
- Reign: 28 August 1995 – present
- Coronation: 11 November 1995
- Predecessor: Aliyu Dan Abdulkadir
- Born: 22 April 1940 (age 86); Ilorin, Northern Region, British Nigeria (now in Kwara State, Nigeria)
- Issue: Abubakar Bature Sulu-Gambari, Sulyman Sulu-Gambari, Fatimah Sulu-Gambari, Aishat Sulu-Gambari, Waziri Sulu-Gambari, Khadijah Sulu-Gambari, Amir Sulu Gambari, Sophia Sulu-Gambari
- House: Alimi
- Father: Zulkarnaini Muhammadu Gambari
- Mother: Ayisatu Nma Sulu-Gambari
- Occupation: Traditional ruler

Ibrahim Kolapo Sulu-Gambari CFR (born 22 April 1940) ascended the throne as the 11th Emir of Ilorin and Chairman Kwara State Traditional Rulers Council since 1995 following the demise of his uncle, Mallam Aliyu AbdulKadir. He relinquished his position as the Presiding Justice of Court of Appeal, Lagos Division to become the Custodian of the Shehu Alimi dynasty. He is one of the 10 prominent traditional rulers in northern Nigeria.

== Early life ==
He started his early school at Native Authority School in 1953 finishing in 1956 then he moved to Offa Grammar School and finished in 1960. Between 1961 and 1962 he studied at Oakham School in England and went on to the City Westminster College until 1963. He moved to Middle Temple School from 1964 to 1967 and in 1966 he attended University of London to 1969 then Nigeria Law School in 1969 to 1971.

He works as permanent secretary and solicitor-general in then Gongola and became judge at Bauchi High Court in 1976 later in 1978 he was Justice in Court of Appeal. He is a nephew of Ibrahim Gambari, the Chief of Staff to the former President of Nigeria, Muhammadu Buhari.

== Northern Nigeria ==
The stool of Emir of Ilorin belongs to one of the three class of monarchs holding the title of Shehu in Northern Nigeria. The others are Shehu Usman Danfodio of Sokoto, Shehu El-Kanemi of Borno and Shehu Alimi Dan Janta of Ilorin.

Alhaji Ibrahim Sulu-Gambari was turbaned as the Ciroman Ilorin by his late father and 9th Emir of Ilorin, Alhaji Zulkarnaini Muhammadu Gambari in 1984, while in active service as the Presiding Justice of the Court of Appeal, Ibadan Division.

The 7th Emir of Ilorin, Shehu Shuaibu Dan Bawa who reigned from 1915 to 1919 was both his maternal great-grandfather (Shuaibu-Abdulkadir-Ayisatu-Ibrahim) and paternal great-grandfather (Shuaibu -Muhammadu Laofe-Zulkarnaini-Ibrahim) making him a prince and ultimately an Emir.

== Career ==
He was one of 138 signatories of the open letter A Common Word Between Us and You by leaders of Islam to leaders of Christian churches everywhere.

Sulu Gambari became the 11th Emir of Ilorin on August 28, 1995, and was crowned on November 11, 1995, as he relinquished his position as the Presiding Justice of the Court of Appeal, Lagos Division.

During the reign of his father Shehu Zulkarnaini Muhammadu Gambari (1959-1992), Kwara State College of Technology now Kwara State Polytechnic, Ilorin, Kwara state College of Education, Ilorin and the University of Ilorin were founded.

During his reign, tertiary institutions increased with the establishment of Al-Hikmah University, Kwara State University, Malete and Muhyideen College of Education, Ilorin among other private and government-owned establishments across the state such as International Aviation College and the Advanced Diagnostic Centre.

He initiated the renovation of Ilorin Central Mosque (constructed by his late father in 1979) to become a world class edifice.

Until he was redeployed to the University of Agriculture Makurdi, Benue State, the Emir had held sway as the Chancellor of the Nnamdi Azikiwe University, Awka, Anambra State for 14 years (2001-2015). On March 2, 2024, Bayero University Kano installed him as the fifth Chancellor of the institution.

During his 11th coronation anniversary in 2006, the Emir turbaned 11 personalities as traditional title holders in the community, prominent among whom are; Dr. Abubakar Bukola Saraki (Turaki’n Ilorin) and a legal luminary who is his eldest son, Barrister Abubakar Bature Sulu-Gambari (Ciroma’n Ilorin).

Sulu-Gambari was a delegate to the most recent constitutional conference where he contributed to the national discuss.

He founded the Shehu Alimi Foundation for Peace and Development with 11-man Committee and made Sheikh Dr. AbdulKadir Oba-Solagberu its National President.

He is currently the Chairman of the Kwara State Traditional Rulers Council
