= Abdulkadir Dan Bawa =

- Emir of Ilorin
- Reign: 1920-1959
- Predecessor: Emir Shuaibu Bawa
- Successor: Sulu Gambari
- Died: 1959
- House: Abdulsalami
- Father: Oba Bawa

Abdulkadir Dan Bawa was the 8th Fulani Emir of Ilorin. He succeeded his father, Shuaib Bawa as Emir in 1919. Bawa was appointed Emir on the recommendation of acting Provincial Resident in Ilorin, Kenneth Elphinstone. He reigned from 1920 to 1959, and witnessed most of the colonial constitutional reforms initiated after the founding of Nigeria in 1914.

== Life ==
Bawa's recommendation for Emirship was announced soon after the death of his father in November 1919, he was formally installed by Hugh Clifford in February 1920. His reign started during the period of Indirect rule and as such he was head of Ilorin Native Authority. His reign coincided with the construction of motorable roads in Ilorin township, including roads connecting Ilorin emirate to Lafiaji, Jebba and River Niger.

In 1935, the Ilorin traditional council had a crisis initiated by the protest of Mogaji Aare, the Baloguns and the Baba Isale, who were all reputable chiefs in the town. The traditional council members were protesting the usurpation of their jurisdiction by some palace officials and Native Administration staff. The chiefs boycotted the palace for a few months until the conflict was settled by the colonial resident. In 1956, another group under the name Ilorin Talaka Parapo became prominent in the Native Authority administration. Originally a formally apolitical and trade oriented organization led by some traders such as Sule Maito, a cattle dealer, and Busari Isale Oja, a merchant. The group became agitated due to perceived excess of the Native Authority, such as the imposition of a water rate in Ilorin township. After being rebuffed by the national leadership of the Northern region dominated NPC, the organization teamed up with the Western region based Action Group and later won key elections to the Native Authority government in 1956. The group went on to effect some changes in the structure of the authority, dismissing loyalists of the traditional emirate council. However, a decision to contemplate merger with the Western region led an exodus of the non-Yoruba members within the group and the group's power declined.
