= Ibadan Republic =

Former country in present-day Nigeria

- c. 1838 – 1893
- Anthem: "Ibadan, city of warriors; They who made it into a great city; We its children will not allow; That their honour and glory perish"
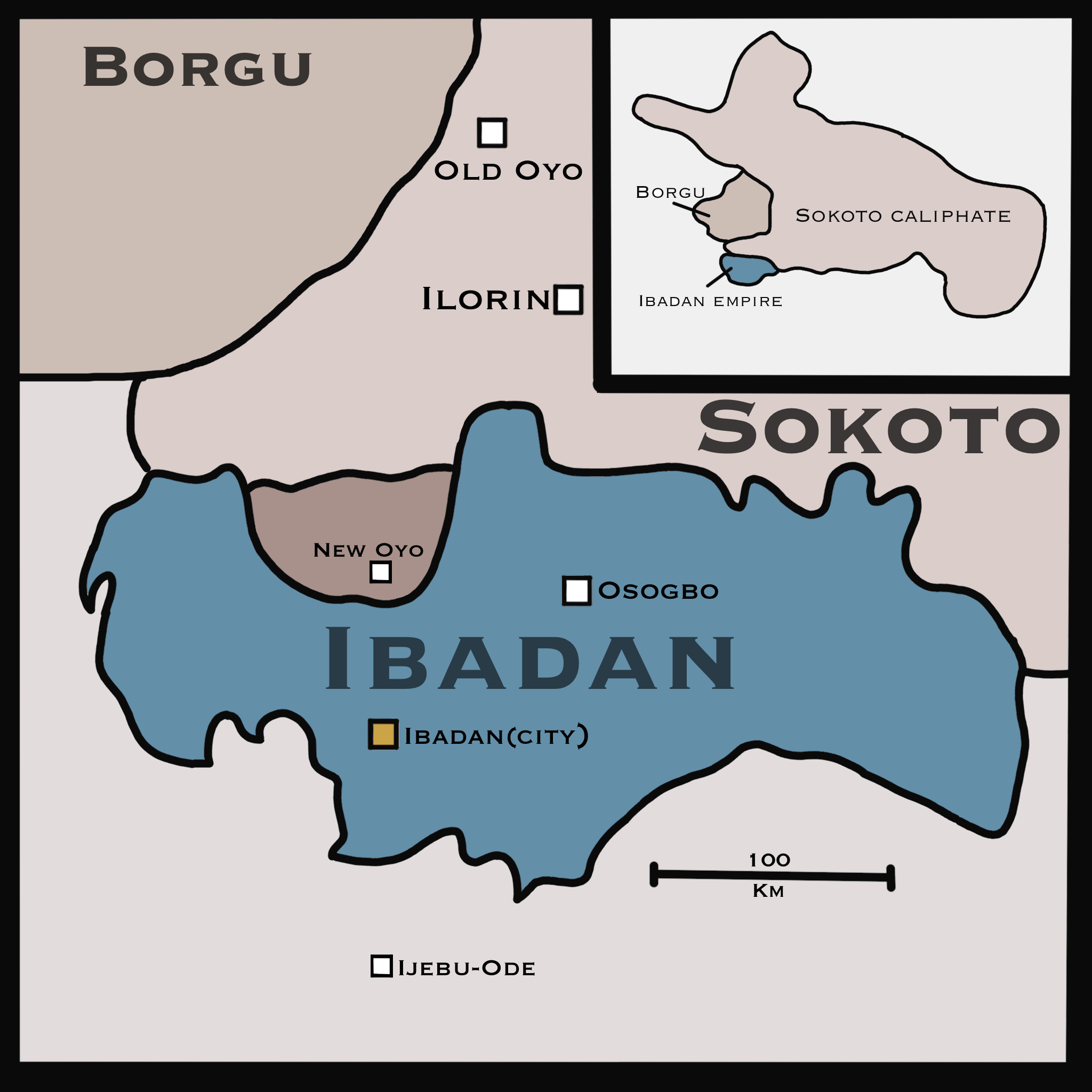
- Ibadan c. 1840
- Capital: Ibadan
- Common languages: Yoruba
- Religion: Yoruba religion, Christianity, Islam
- Government: Military republic
- The Baale, Balogun or Seriki
  - c. 1850s – 1867: Ogunmola
  - c. 1872 – 1885: Are Latosa
- History
  - Battle of Òsogbo: c. 1838
  - British intervention of 1893: 1893
Preceded by	Succeeded by
Oyo Empire	Southern Nigeria Protectorate

The Ibadan Republic was a powerful Yoruba state in present-day Nigeria. It emerged in the 19th century following the collapse of the Oyo Empire. Initially a war camp in the 1820s, Ibadan evolved into a major military power after its decisive victory against the Ilorin Emirate in 1838 at the Battle of Òsogbo. This victory not only halted the Fula jihad's advance but also established Ibadan as the principal defender of the Yoruba region. Its empire however was relatively short-lived, lasting until its incorporation into British colonial Nigeria in 1893. It set the foundation for the present-day traditional political structure that exists till today.

== Formation ==
Ibadan's rise was fueled by several factors. The collapse of the Oyo Empire created a power vacuum, allowing Ibadan to consolidate its power. Its unique military system, based on merit rather than heredity, cultivated a formidable fighting force. It had strategic alliances with other neighbors given it was a refugee camp with indigenes from across Yorubaland. It also had diplomatic ties with the British on trade, access to firearms and other resources. Ibadan's central location within Yorubaland enabled it to control vital trade routes and the flow of valuable goods like palm oil, strengthening its economic and military power. The population of the capital was 60,000 to 100,000 by 1851.

== Government structure ==
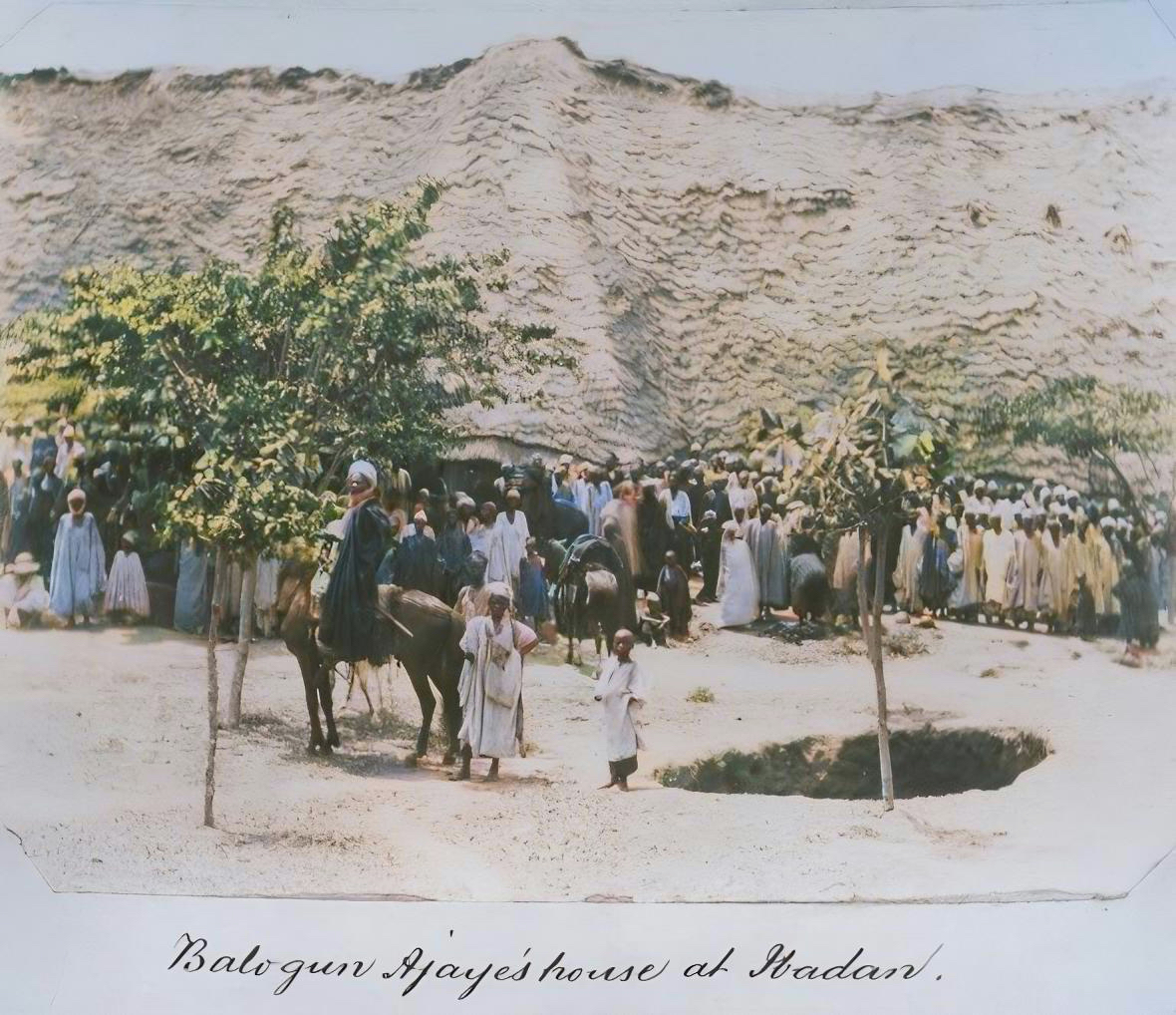
Balogun Ajaye's house at Hadan (Ibadan), late 19th century, colorized

Ibadan's system of government in the 19th century marked a departure from traditional Yoruba governance structures. Unlike the hereditary constitutional framework common in Yoruba towns, Ibadan had no resident crowned ruler. Instead, the Alaafin of Oyo was nominally recognized as king. But due to his geographical remoteness and reliance on Ibadan's military power, the Alaafin wielded practically zero control over the city. Ibadan's government comprised four distinct lines of chiefs, one civil chief, two lines of military chiefs, and a line of female chiefs. The first three lines were the most important. Leadership positions were open to all freeborn male residents of Ibadan, with merit especially demonstrated military ability being the primary criterion.

Ibadan was closely aligned with the new Oyo Empire. Given the fall of the Old Oyo Empire, the new governance structure ensured a balance of power that still exists till today. It created one of the most inclusive political systems. The ruling council included an administrative line, military line, women and youth that acted as checks and balances from to ensure no single leader could become a dictator. Ibadan's political system is still intact till today because it created one of the most orderly transitions of power on the African continent.

• Civil Line (Otun / Egbe Agba Line): Headed historically by the Baale (and later the Olubadan), this line manages civil and administrative matters in the town.

• Balogun Line (Military Line): Headed by the Balogun, this line represents the military leadership of Ibadan.

• Seriki Line: A line traditionally created for younger, unproven, or rising warriors and distinctive military leaders who were outside the immediate senior Balogun track.

• Iyalode Line: A dedicated line created to represent the interests of women (headed by the Iyalode, known as the "mother of the town").

== Economy ==
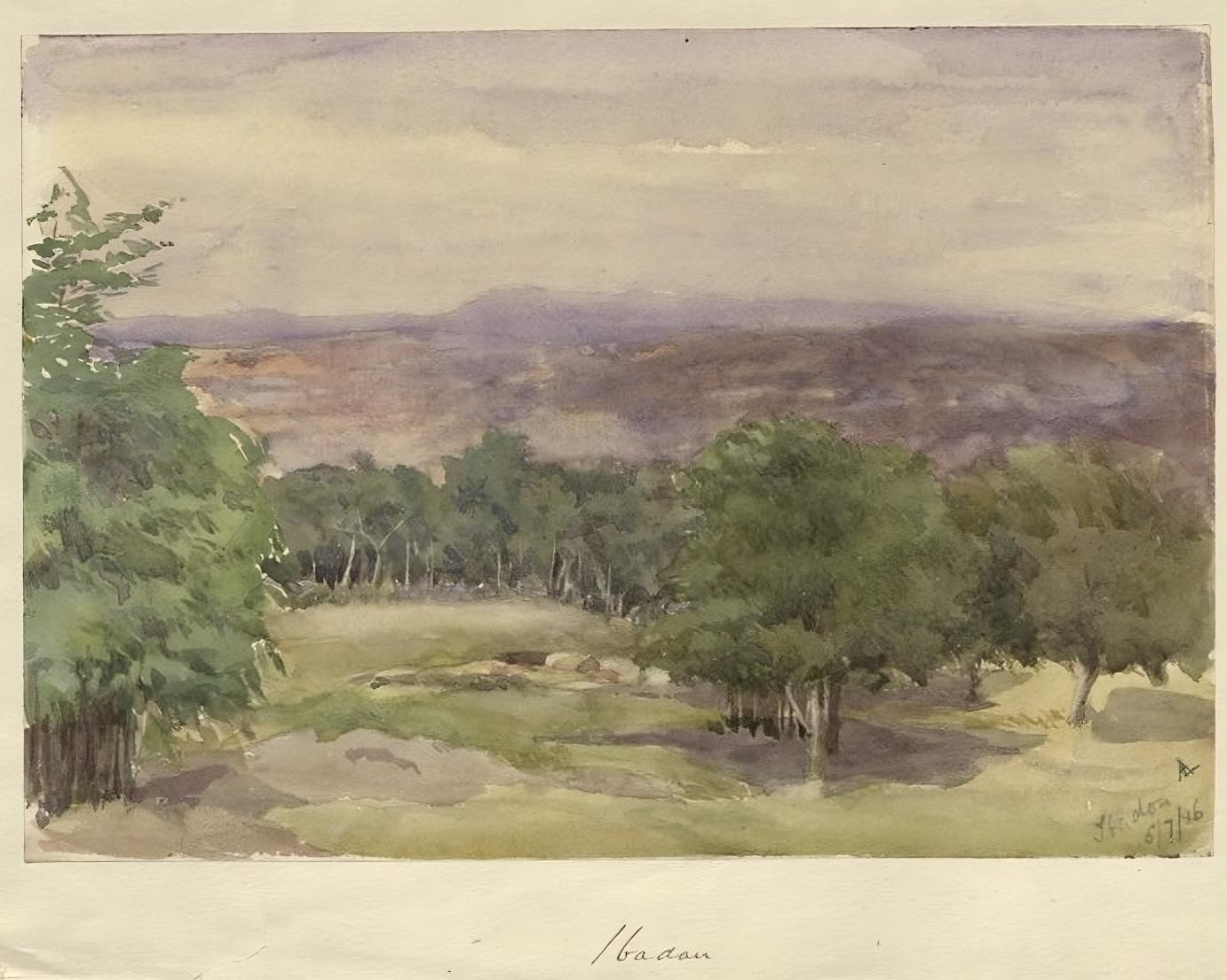
Drawing of Ibadan's landscape in the late 19th century

Ibadan's military and economic development were linked closely. The demands of a military state stimulated economic activity, driving growth in agriculture, trade, and craft production. Ibadan's agricultural system was sophisticated, encompassing both Oko Etile (farms near the city worked by daily commuters) and Oko Egan (large, distant farm villages worked by resident labor). Slaves handled a bulk of the work force on farms and a singular farm could have as many as 600 slaves. Many Fula and Hausa war captives were enslaved on farms to tend to horses and cattle. However, the constant state of warfare also hampered long-term economic growth. Raids and insecurity frequently disrupted agriculture, sometimes causing famine.

Because of Ibadan operated within the geopolitical context of the former Oyo Empire, specialized industries like blacksmithing and silversmithing thrived to meet the military's needs. The blacksmithing industry, supported by about 70 workshops scattered across the town, was central to Ibadan's military strength. Many blacksmiths were refugees from the former Oyo Empire. They produced essential weapons, including locally made guns, swords, axes, spears, and knives. These workshops relied on the smelting industry for a steady supply of pig iron.

A complex trade network, managed by the Alarobo guild under the leadership of the Parakoyi, facilitated the exchange of goods through a system of rural and daily markets, each overseen by an Iyaloja (market leader). The high demand for firearms catalyzed the production of palm oil, which became a key trade item during the era of legitimate trade between West Africa and Europe. In addition to palm oil, Ibadan exported foodstuffs like corn, beans, and yams to the coastal traders, especially the Ijebu, who relied on the hinterland for sustenance due to their primary focus on commerce.

Ibadan's geographic location contributed significantly to its emergence as a trade hub. Situated near the boundary of the forest and savannah regions, it served as a meeting point for traders exchanging goods from both ecological zones. This natural advantage of accessibility, reflected in its name Ibadan, meaning 'near the savannah', positioned the city as a key node in regional commerce.

With the decline of the western Yoruba region following the collapse of the Oyo Empire, Ibadan became a critical economic powerhouse in the continuation of the trans-Saharan trade network leading to the coast.

In 1890, just a few years before its collapse, the capital city was described by British missionary as

"The London of Negroland ... Surrounded by its farming villages, 163 in number, Ibadan counts over 200,000 souls, while within the walls of the city itself at least 120,000 people are gathered. Its sea of brown roofs covers an area of nearly 16 square miles, and the ditches and walls of hardened clay, which surround it, are more than 18 miles in circumference..."

== Decline ==
The Kiriji War, triggered by the beheading of an Ibadan representative in Okemesi for allegedly disrupting a religious festival, was essentially a struggle for independence waged by Ibadan's tributary states. Tired of Ibadan's oppressive rule, the Ekiti, Ijesa, Igbomina, Yagba, and Akoko people formed the Ekitiparapo Confederacy, a formidable alliance that challenged Ibadan's dominance. Initially, Ibadan, with its superior military strength and the support of Oyo, seemed poised to crush the rebellion. However, the Ekitiparapo forces, bolstered by the acquisition of modern breech-loading firearms such as Snider rifles, Martini-Henry rifles, and Winchester repeaters from their kinsmen in Lagos and covert support from the Alaafin of Oyo (who feared Ibadan's growing power), put up a fierce resistance.

The war reached a stalemate by 1880, with both sides establishing fortified camps that evolved into virtual cities. The conflict, characterized by its prolonged sieges and devastating battles, became a war of attrition, draining the resources of both sides. Ibadan's traditional military tactics, relying on superior numbers and the use of cavalry, proved less effective in the face of the Ekitiparapo's modern weaponry and the difficult terrain. The war not only exposed the limitations of Ibadan's military but also highlighted the deep-seated resentment against its rule.

The influx of refugees to Ibadan during the war further strained its resources and exacerbated internal tensions, highlighting the challenges faced by the empire during this tumultuous period. While Ibadan was able to prevent a defeat, the war significantly weakened its power and prestige, paving the way for British intervention and the eventual demise of the empire. The British treaties of 1886 and 1893 curtailed Ibadan's autonomy, leading to its absorption into the British colony.
