= Battle of Pamo =

1830s battle in western Nigeria

Date	1830s
Location	Kwara, and Ilorin 8°30′N 4°33′E
Result	Decisive Sokoto Caliphate / Fula victory
Territorial changes	Ilorin undoubtedly under Fula control.

Belligerents
Abdulsalami, Alami Sokoto Caliphate	Solagberu, Yoruba Allies.

Strength
Unknown	Unknown

Casualties and losses
Minor	Heavy

The Battle of Pamo took place in Nigeria in the 1830s, when the Fulas under Solagberu defeated the Yoruba.

== Background ==
From the Yoruba perspective, the Battle of Pamo was a pivotal encounter during the protracted conflicts between the Ibadan and Ilorin forces in the 19th century, reflecting the larger struggle to maintain control over key trade routes and political influence in Yorubaland. Seen as a defense of Yoruba sovereignty, the battle symbolized Ibadan's resistance against the northward expansion of Ilorin, which was supported by Fulani jihadist interests.

Alimi, the Fula Muslim Imam who led the foreigners in Ilorin, died after the last war. His son Abudusalami succeeded him, becoming the first king or Emir of Ilorin. This marked the definitive rule of the Fulas in Ilorin, providing a home for the Gambaris (Hausas) recruited from the Jamas.

Initially, Alimi, a highly respected figure in Ilorin, had no intention of settling there or engaging in conquest. When Afonja and the Jamas engaged in excesses, Alimi considered returning to his homeland due in disgust. However, the Yoruba elders urged him to stay and act as a check on Afonja. Eventually, Ilorin prevailed upon him to make it his home.

Alimi, a pure Fula, and his Fula wife initially faced childlessness. Seeking a solution, the wife consulted a Muslim priest, who advised her to give a slave as alms to a distinguished Muslim priest. She chose her husband, leading to the birth of Abudusalami and Shitta. Alimi later took a third wife, having another son. At his death, he left four sons, but no advantage in governance favored the son of the real wife over the slave wife's sons, leading to black rulers in Ilorin by the third generation.

The Fulas, aiming to subvert the entire Yoruba country, took advantage of internal conflicts among Yoruba war-chiefs. The power of the Fulas grew, leading to expeditions, devastation, and depopulation. Despite warnings, Yoruba families failed to unite against the common enemy, engaging in internal wars that weakened the country.

== Battle ==
Disputes among Yoruba chiefs, such as Toyeje and Adegun, further divided the country. The Kakanfo formed alliances and besieged the Onikoyi, involving Solagberu of Ilorin. Wise measures saved the city, and Ilorin's Emir aimed to lift the siege, eventually defeating the Kakanfo's army. Civil war erupted between Solagberu and the Emir, leading to the fall of Oke Suna and Solagberu's demise.

== Aftermath ==
With no rivals left, Abudusalami sought to control the Yoruba kingdom, aided by the oppressive Jamas. The remaining Yoruba towns were placed under tribute, solidifying the Fulas' control over Ilorin.

This battle was narrated, and written down by the accredited Yoruba historian, Samuel Johnson in The History of the Yorubas.

== See also ==
- Battle of Ilorin
- Mugbamugba War
- Battle of Ogele
- Sack of Old Oyo
