= Unilorin Secondary School =

Coordinates: 8.4615°N 4.6508°E

Unilorin Secondary school School

Location
- University of Ilorin Mini campus, Adewole, Ilorin; Ilorin, Kwara; Nigeria

Information
- Type: Private Secondary
- Motto: Hardwork, Discipline and Progress
- Established: 1981
- School district: Ilorin
- Principal: Mrs. S.N. Jaiyeola
- Enrollment: 2,000
- Classes: JSS1 - SSS3
- Colors: Purple and White
- Website: www.unilorin.edu.ng

Unilorin Secondary School is the staff school of the University of Ilorin, Nigeria. The school is a private school. The school used to be located near the senior staff quarters in the University's permanent site, but it was relocated in 2012 to the mini campus of the University.

== Achievements ==
In 2009, a student of the school was the overall best student in the National examination council examinations.
