= Emmanuel Baptist College =

Emmanuel Baptist College, Ilorin

Location
- Emmanuel Baptist College Road; Ilorin, Kwara. Nigeria
- Coordinates: 8°28′53.400″N 4°30′1.080″E

Information
- Type: Private, day and boarding, Co-educational
- Motto: 'In God we trust'
- Founded: October 2000
- Principal: Mr. Adebayo
- Enrollment: 412
- Affiliation: Nigerian Baptist Convention
- Website: ebco.com.ng

Emmanuel Baptist College is a Baptist secondary school located at Tanke in Ilorin, Kwara State, Nigeria. It is a mixed private mission school. It is affiliated with the Nigerian Baptist Convention.

== History ==
Emmanuel Baptist College, Ilorin was established by Emmanuel Baptist Church, Ilorin on October 9, 2000. Emmanuel Baptist College is a registered member of the Nigerian Baptist Convention of Private Schools. It participates in the yearly organized Baptist Mission Schools Seminars and workshops. It is run by a committee from the church. A principal is appointed by the committee to manage the affairs of the school.

Emmanuel Baptist College is an approved NECO SSCE and WASSCE centre.

== Sport ==
Emmanuel Baptist College holds its interhouse sport competition annually or bi-annually. The sports in the competition are football, march past, table tennis, long and short-distance races and marathon race.

== Departments ==
Emmanuel Baptist College has Science, Art and Commercial departments for the senior secondary students while the junior secondary students all do the same subjects.
