= Battle of Òsogbo =

Yoruba-Fulani War

- Part of the Yoruba Revolutionary Wars and Fula jihads
- Location of Osogbo within modern Nigeria
Date	c. 1840 (Some later sources suggest 1838)
Location	Outskirts of Osogbo, Yorubaland (present-day Nigeria) 7°46′N 4°34′E
Result	Ibadan/Osogbo victory

Belligerents
Sokoto Caliphate; Ilorin Emirate	Ibadan Republic; Osogbo

Commanders and leaders
Emir Shitta; Balogun Ali; Balogun Ajikobi (executed); Balogun Lateju (executed); Elese †	Balogun Oderinlo; Obele Alias Mobitan; Alade Abimpagun; Balogun Abitiko; Balogun Lajubu

Strength
Primarily cavalry armed with spears; estimated ~5,000 troops	Primarily infantry armed with long swords, few muskets; chiefs mounted

Casualties and losses
Heavy losses; many killed or captured, large number of horses captured	Unknown, likely lighter than Ilorin

The Battle of Òsogbo was a pivotal military engagement fought circa 1840 (though some later sources suggest 1838) during the Yoruba Revolutionary Wars of the 19th century. It was also a significant event within the Fula jihads in Yorubaland. The battle is widely regarded as a major turning point which decisively checked the southward expansion of the Ilorin Emirate a vassal state of the Sokoto Caliphate, and confirmed the military ascendancy of the city-state of Ibadan Republic among the Yoruba successor states of the defunct Oyo Empire. Its impact on the political and military landscape of the region was profound.

== Background ==
By the late 1830s, the initial impetus of the Fula jihad, to conquer Yorubaland all the way to the coast, which had led to the fall of the Oyo Empire and the establishment of the Ilorin Emirate within northern Yorubaland, had diminished. A defeat at Gbodo around 1840 against a Yoruba-Borgu coalition had shown the jihadists were not invincible. However, Ilorin's ambition to extend its control southward remained strong, using its strategic position as a base.

In the preceding decades, following the collapse of Oyo, many Yoruba people had migrated south into the forest belt for protection, founding new towns or enlarging existing settlements. Osogbo became a key city of refuge, described as "Oshogbo ilu asala nigba isansa Oshogbo"(Osogbo, town of refuge in the time of flight). Situated strategically on the edge of the forest, it was a vital hub connecting major Yoruba centers via six main routes to Ekiti, Ilesha, Ife, Ibadan, Oyo, and Ilorin. Its control was deemed essential by Ilorin for their push towards the coast. Like many Yoruba towns, Osogbo was protected by double earth walls about five feet high and ditches, with the Oshun River providing a natural defense to the south and southwest.

The Ilorin attack on Osogbo in c. 1840, reportedly their third attempt, was commanded by Hausa Balogun Ali, leading an estimated force of around 5,000 troops, primarily cavalry. They laid close siege to the town. Facing imminent defeat, the King of Osogbo appealed for aid from Ibadan, which had rapidly grown from a war camp into the region's most powerful military state. Initial Ibadan reinforcements proved insufficient. Consequently, the main Ibadan army was dispatched under the command of Balogun Oderinlo. They entered Osogbo from the south, crossing the Oshun River at a spot later called Elegba, supposedly named after the 2,000 cowries Oderinlo paid the ferrymen.

== Battle ==
After Oderinlo's arrival, there was a delay while the Ibadan leadership planned their response. The Ibadan army consisted mainly of infantry armed with long swords, with only a few muskets and horses primarily for the chiefs. This contrasted with the Ilorin force, which relied heavily on cavalry armed with spears.

A council of war was held at Idi Aka on the town's north-west side. Recognizing the disadvantage against cavalry in open daylight, the Ibadan commanders made the unusual decision to launch a surprise night attack to neutralize the Ilorin horsemen. Such tactics were rare, possibly unknown, in Yoruba warfare.

As dusk fell, the Ibadan forces formed up between the inner and outer walls on the north-east side, facing the Ilorin camp situated towards Ikirun. They used a password for identification: Question: "What is the fare of the ferry?" Answer: "2,000 cowries," referencing their river crossing. Under cover of darkness, they advanced past the outer wall at a place later known as Agbodogunand fell upon the unsuspecting Ilorin camp.

The surprise was total. The Ilorin troops were caught unprepared, many asleep in their tents. Chaos erupted, and the Ilorin cavalry could not mount an effective defence or counter-attack in the darkness and confusion. Johnson described horsemen trying to spur their horses away before untethering them. Panic spread, organized resistance collapsed, and the Ilorin forces were routed, possibly suffering casualties from friendly fire in the confusion.

The battle was a decisive victory for Ibadan and their Osogbo allies. Many Ilorin soldiers were killed or captured, though Balogun Ali managed to escape with some followers. A large number of horses were captured; local tradition claims their skeletons were found on the site long after.

== Aftermath ==
The victory was overwhelming, demonstrated by the large number of prisoners and horses captured. Horses were reportedly sold for as little as one cowrie in Osogbo afterwards, though the Ibadan primarily valued only their tails as charms or decoration and did not significantly use the captured animals to build their own cavalry.

Regarding captured commanders, while the Hausa Balogun Ali escaped, the Yoruba commanders within the Ilorin army, Lateju and Ajikobi, were considered traitors by Ibadan. Lateju was reportedly executed by Ibadan, while Ajikobi was sent to the Alaafin of Oyo for execution.

The capture of prisoners contributed to the presence of people of Fula origin within Ibadan in subsequent decades. The missionary Anna Hinderer, writing about her experiences in Ibadan around 1859, noted the presence of Fula people held in servitude, particularly for tending cattle, an occupation Yoruba cultural norms restricted. She observed:

"I have been having a visit from some Fulani people; they are Mohammedans, and take care of the cows. No Yoruban may milk a cow, so there are always some Fulani slaves, belonging to the chiefs, to take care' of these creatures. They all live together, and are very independent, but staunch Mohammedans... They were saying to-day, after some handgrasping and coaxing, ' Ah ! lya, we are both alike, we are strangers in this country; we both speak a different language from this people, so we are one."

This account from nearly two decades after the battle illustrates one aspect of the complex social dynamics in Ibadan, where individuals from rival groups, including Fula, existed in varying states of dependency and servitude.

The Battle of Osogbo effectively halted the southward military expansion of the Ilorin Emirate and, by extension, the Sokoto Caliphate, into the Yoruba heartland. While Ilorin remained a smaller regional power and continued to seek influence, its strategy shifted more towards diplomacy, manipulation, and exploiting internal Yoruba conflicts rather than direct conquest. This victory solidified Ibadan's dominance as the premier military power in the region and arguably saved the core Yoruba territories from becoming tributary states to the Sokoto Caliphate.

Historians like Johnson have noted that Ibadan did not follow up this victory with a counter-offensive north towards Ilorin itself. Ade-Ajayi and Smith suggest this reflects the reality that Ibadan and other Yoruba states were more preoccupied with internal power struggles and economic rivalries within Yorubaland. It was only later, under combined pressure from the British advancing from Lagos, the Dahomey kingdom from the west, and the continued threat from Ilorin, that broader Yoruba reconciliation became feasible, though ultimately too late to prevent colonial rule.

== Historiography ==
Detailed contemporary accounts of the battle are scarce. Unlike later Yoruba conflicts witnessed by Christian missionaries (e.g., at Abeokuta or Ijaye), none were present in Osogbo around 1840. Consequently, knowledge of the battle relies heavily on written Arabic literature from Ilorin and later compilations of oral traditions, particularly Samuel Johnson's The History of the Yorubas and accounts preserved in Osogbo itself. This reliance on oral history likely contributes to uncertainties, such as the precise year the battle was fought.
