= Kwara State College of Arabic and Islamic Legal Studies, Ilorin =

Nigerian college

Kwara State College of Arabic and Islamic Legal Studies Ilorin, was established by the Kwara State Government through an act in 1992. The college is one out of 4 that are affiliated to the Bayero University in Kano, Nigeria.

Kwara State College of Arabic and Islamic legal studies was established by the state's Muslim community to provide the college and other similar institutions with a place to acquire arts and Islamic education.

On September 7, 2020, The National Board for Technical Education (NBTE) approved the college to begin National Diploma (ND) programme.

The college is currently affiliated to Kwara State University (KWASU) for its regular diploma and sandwich degree programmes.

== Rename ==
On 1 September 2022 the state owned college was rename from her former name to a new name as College of Arabic, Islamic, Legal and Management Studies (CAILMS), the new name was made known by the deputy Registrar of the college.

== Programs ==
- Advance Diploma Programmes
1. Advance Diploma in Legal Studies (Common Law)
- Professional Diploma in Education Programmes (PDE)
1. Professional Diploma in Education - Arabic Medium
2. Professional Diploma in Education - English Medium
- Sandwich Degree Programmes (SAN)
1. B.A. (Ed) Islamic Studies
2. B.A. (Ed) English Language / Literature in English
3. B.A. (Ed) Yoruba
4. B.SC. (Ed) Computer Science
5. B.SC. (Ed) Business Education
6. B.Ed Educational Management
7. B.Ed Primary Education
8. B.Ed Library and Information Science
9. B.A. (Ed) Language Arts and Communication
10. B.A (Ed) Special Education.

== Courses Available ==
1. Dip available available oma in Arabic and English
2. Diploma in Arabic and Islamic Studies (Arabic Medium)
3. Diploma in Arabic and Islamic Studies (English Medium)
4. Diploma in Arabic, Islamic Studies and Education (Arabic Medium)
5. Diploma in Arabic, Islamic Studies and Education (English Medium)
6. Diploma in Common Law
7. Diploma in Computer Science
8. Diploma in English and History
9. Diploma in English and Islamic Studies
10. Diploma in English, Islamic Studies and Education
11. Diploma in Islamic Studies and English
12. Diploma in Islamic Studies and Yoruba
13. Diploma in Islamic Studies, English and Education
14. Diploma in Library Science
15. Diploma in Mass Communication
16. Diploma in Shariah and Common Law.
