= Old Oyo =

Oyo Ile Katunga, Eyo, Old Oyo
- Site of medieval city
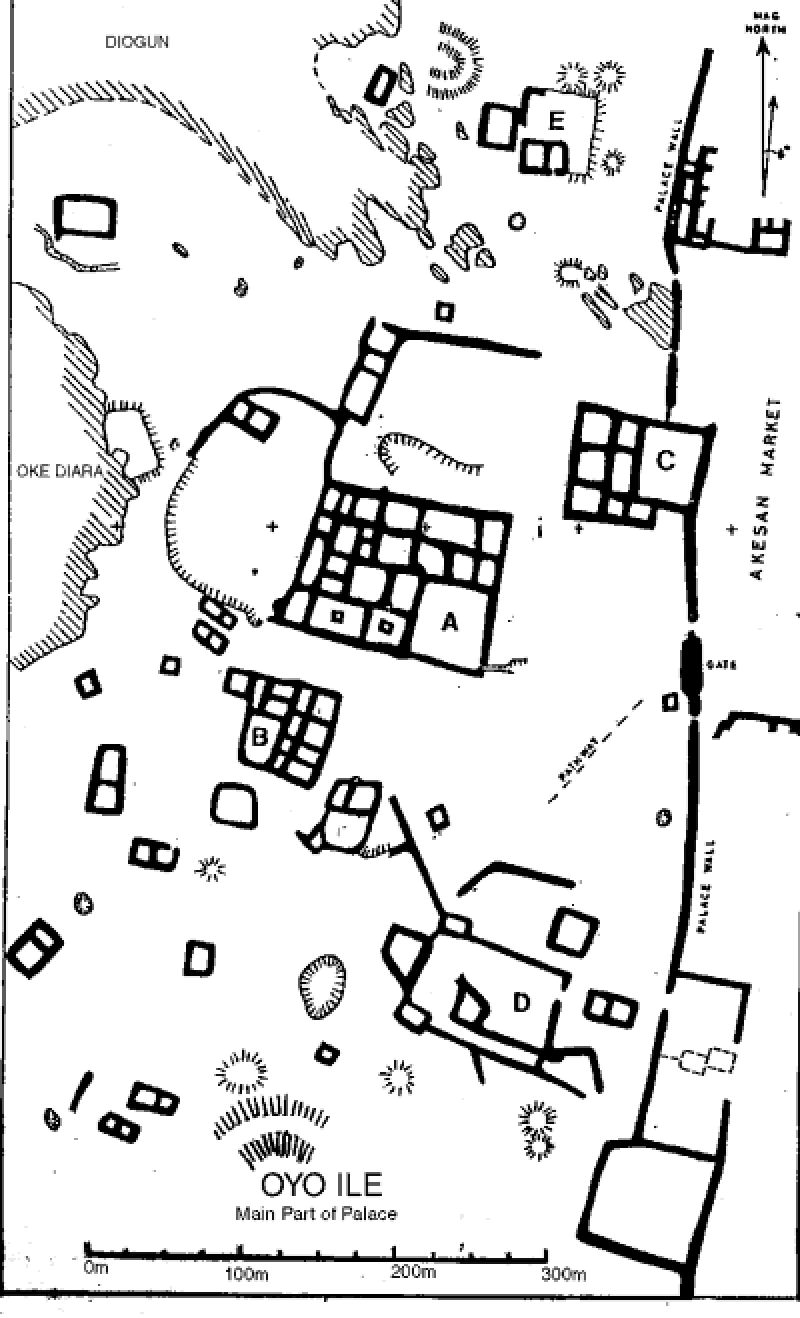
- Survey of palace grounds by Brian Hallam

- Location within Nigeria
- Coordinates: 8°58′29″N 4°18′27″E
- Country: Nigeria
- Settled: 14th century
- Founder: Oranmiyan

Old Oyo, also known as Oyo-Ile, Katunga, Oyo-Oro, and Eyo is the site of a ruined medieval city that was once the capital of the Oyo Empire in what is now modern-day Nigeria. It has been abandoned since 1835.

It was a major cultural and political center of West Africa during the empire's height. Established by Yoruba groups migrating from the city of Ile-Ife, the city was the seat of authority for the Alaafin, or custodian/keeper of the palace which was called the Aafin. As the capital of a major state during the 17th and 18th centuries, the city is also the site of large markets such as the Akesan market, which was recreated in the later city of New Oyo. Archaeology has been conducted at this site for over four decades. The area designated as Old Oyo is nearly 3,000 hectares (36,000,000 yd^{2}).

== History ==
=== Founding ===
According to The History of the Yorubas, the Oyo-Ile kingdom's founder was Oranmiyan. The Afin, the large palace complex, is a Yoruba tradition, while the sprawling market area signifies the role that mercantilism played in the maintenance and central focus of the Oyo empire. The Alaafin ('owner of the palace') was both ruler and judge for their people.

=== Abandonment ===
By the 1830s the Oyo Empire, once the most powerful state in the region, had weakened dramatically at the expense of the rising Ilorin Emirate. Oluewu, Alaafin of Oyo, tried to restore his dynasty's prestige, but was defeated and killed at the Battle of Ilorin.

During the Alaafin's absence Lanloke, chief of Ogodo, had attacked the city but been repulsed. When news of the disaster outside Ilorin arrived, he attacked again but was again unsuccessful. The citizens of the city, however, understood that they could not hold out. Nearly all of them packed their bags and fled the city, leaving it abandoned. The Oyo royal family and many nobles fled southward to establish a new capital at Oyo Atiba (New Oyo). Other refugees went to Kihisi, Igboho or even Ilorin. Some were able to make multiple return trips to the city to collect their belongings. Eventually Lanloke returned a third time, plundered what little wealth remained, and left the city in ruins. Ilorin gained control of the territory.

After its abandonment, Oyo-Ile never returned to city status. Over a century later, it was declared a game reserve and, later, a national park.

=== Position in the future ===
The feasibility of Old Oyo as a center for tourism has been studied.

== Geography ==
According to the National Commission for Museums and Monuments, Old Oyo historical site is located at the coordinates 8°56'-9° 03' North 4°20'- 4°26'East.

The site is situated South of River Niger, in a Woodland savanna area. In the region of West Africa, Grassland Savanna and to a lesser extent, Broadleaf Forests have been the dominant biome in the last 520 ka.

The seasons of Nigeria alternate between rainy and dry, though, different from the North, the South has a longer rain, followed by a shorter dry period, then followed by a short wet and long dry season.

The land in Oyo state changes the further North one travels, transitioning from lowland into rocky terrain. The entire area has north–south flowing rivers and their tributaries. A study on groundwater potential in this region shows that within this state, there is a distribution of aquifers, though little groundwater potential.

In the site of Old Oyo, there was a water reservoir located near the palace, created as a water catchment area from rainfall and wells, as the ground is rocky and difficult to dig. According to Johnson, the city of Oyo-Ile was separated into 11 sections, and, mirrored in the city of New Oyo, a minor district on the outskirts of the city was dedicated to Shango.

== Archaeological site ==
This site has been lengthy occupied, and the effects of inhabitancy can be seen as changes to the environment, horticulture, and visible human artifacts still present on the landscape. Of the archaeology, there are features; the remains of walls and

According to Frank Willett, the first Ife antiquity to be obtained by a European was sold at the Queen's market of Old Oyo.

Located in what is now the Oyo state of Nigeria, the national park that preserves this area also extends into the Kwara state.

In the broader landscape of empires in this area, Oyo Empire at its height in 1780 was a larger than the surrounding coastal empires, and city of Old Oyo received tribute in the form of slaves, soldiers, taxes, etc. During this time, Agbaje-Williams estimates the population to be 60,000 to 140,000 people. Phosphate surveys across the site reveal a spike in measurement near the area where the Akesan marketplace once lay. Anthropogenic changes to the natural environment in this site have resulted in baobab trees, useful shrubs, and thickets being more prevalent in areas of greater human occupation.

The Oyo-Ile Kingdom, during the crest of its power, sponsored new kingdoms located in the Oyo, Egbado, and Igbomina regions of Nigeria.

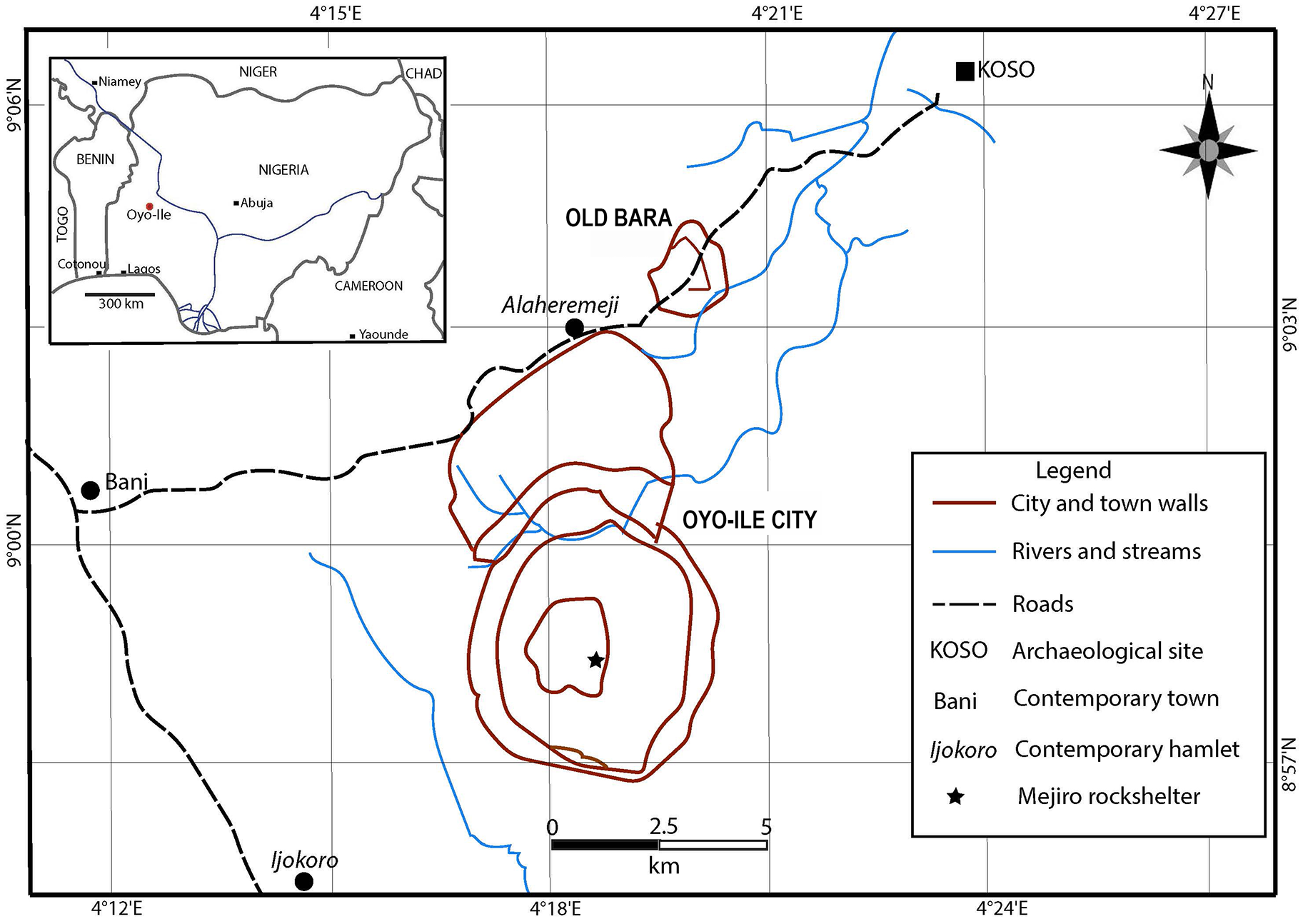
Map of the metropolitan area of the Oyo Empire showing Oyo-Ile and Old Bara (the royal suburb).

=== Artifacts ===
Excavations were carried out in 1981, 2002, 2004, and 2006.

The Aafin area has visible remnants of walls and pottery, and excavations yield charcoal and potsherds to varying depths. Inside the Main Outer wall, mud walls (collapsed and seen as mounds) are again visible, with more intense occupation mounds. From this excavation, a ceramic plate was found that originates from a nearby material source. Eastern areas of these series of excavations show two occupation levels, whereas the test pit in the Western part in 2006 had one occupation. Pottery can be visible partway buried in this area. In the area between the Outer wall and the Main Outer wall, material was not seen, but excavations revealed pottery fragments. Segi, dichroic beads, are found at Old Oyo similar to other sites in Yorubaland.

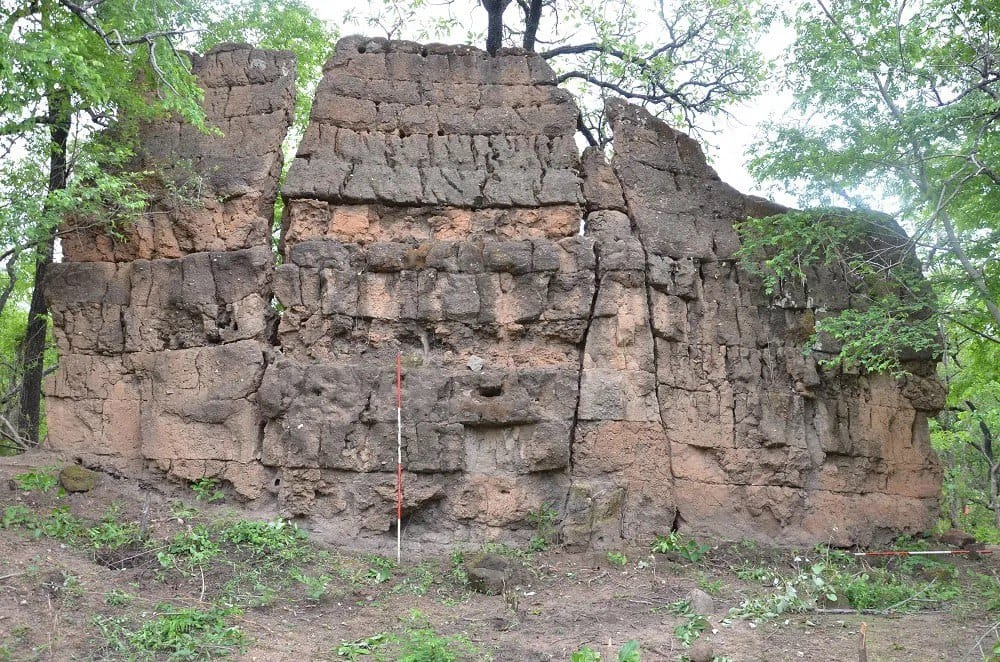
A similar type of wall to the one that once stood at Old Oyo. found at Koso.

=== Walls ===
The walls of the city had a wide circumference, with ditches accompanying the walls. Some of the ground was dug, and a second earthwork was built on the other side of the ditch. There are three divisions of wall that researchers have established in Old Oyo: those of the Outer, the Main Outer, and the Inner wall (Aafin). 7.5 km encircling the Aafin, 18 km of the Main Outer, and 28 km of the Outer.

The walls of Oyo-Ile have been mapped several times. In most areas, they have collapsed or split, with the most enduring being those of the Inner circle, three inner and one outer of the walls surviving today .

An account of the wall from when they were still standing in 1829 by Scottish explorer Hugh Clapperton is as follows, "A belt of thick wood runs round the walls, which are built of clay, and about twenty feet high, and surrounded by a dry ditch. There are ten gates in the walls, which are about fifteen miles in circumference, of an oval shape, about four miles in diameter one way, and six miles the other, the south end leaning against the rocky hills, and forming an inaccessible barrier in that quarter."

Small fragments of the wall revealed through archaeological work, revealed that the palace walls were completely smoothed and polished.

=== Pavements ===
Three successive levels of potsherd pavements, consisting of flatly laid ceramic tiles, have been uncovered at Old Oyo. Two radiocarbon dates of ca. 13th and 14th centuries are assigned to the pavements. The pavements are associated with the flooring of houses, temples, and roads.

=== Pottery ===
Pottery is found in abundance at this site. Old Oyo pottery, as described by Dr. Ogiogwa, can include "characteristic burnishing, basting, brush marking, shell-edge, scallop impressions, dot punctuate, and incised geometric symbols consisting of cross, triangular, square, and perpendicular motifs.", the Oyo ceramic complex. Restated in other papers, burnished-basted surfaces are signatures of Old Oyo ceramics. These productions have been found in various sites within the empire as well as being found in Ijebu, potential putting Ijebu of a status with Ilesa in relation to the Oyo Empire, or simply having contact through trade, as both groups took advantage of their positions between sea and land. The two styles that archeologists have isolated at Old Oyo include Diogun and Mejiro. Typically, the pottery found in excavations within this site have local origins. Large pots had storage purposes, with those of medium sizes being used for cooking, and the smallest used as jars (grey/brown), bowls (typically dark grey/black), lamps and plates. In spite of the major changes in size and cultural reach, the changes in pottery style throughout the city's occupation are not extensive. There is a lack of spores and pollen within the ceramics, which could be caused by a high firing temperature (more spores than pollen) or the origin of the clay had few plants.

==== Diogun ====
A style of pottery found in layers before than the presence of walls. The dates for this occupation is (1100±110 AD), with further dating efforts adding dates as late as 765±90. "These wares are characterized by sandy paste, fawn/ grey-brown colour, and complex fluted rims."

==== Mejiro ====
The later style of pottery, labeled by Soper, was present at the nearby Mejiro cave. Characterized as grey/black wares, the beginning date is 1300±80. In mid-later points of this stage, potters marks are distinguished which helps archeologists track the spread of the artisans and their products across the wide trade routes and the travels of the people of Old Oyo, as well as their dispersal after the city's collapse.

=== Ironworking ===
Large scale iron-working is known to be more prominent in the areas surrounding Old Oyo than in other regions of West Africa. This is caused by rich deposits in the area, and greater iron-working enabled the military to be better-equipped, and the empire to expand further.

=== Evidence of intense settlement ===
There are grinding hollows and grindstones found at this site. Grinding hollows can be used for a variety of purposes, including food, pigment, ceramic, and metal production.
