= International Aviation College, Ilorin =

Aviation school in Ilorin, Kwara State, Nigeria

- Type: Public
- Established: 2011
- Rector: AVM Abdul Yekini Bello (rtd)
- Location: Ilorin, Kwara State, Nigeria
- Campus: Urban
- Nickname: IAC
- Website: www.iac.kw.gov.ng

International Aviation College, Ilorin is an aviation training school in Ilorin, Kwara State, Nigeria. The college was established in 2011 by the Kwara State Government through a public private partnership with an aviation consult. The college is located along Airport road, Ilorin and is very close to the Ilorin international airport. The college has trained over 110 pilots since its establishment. The college appoints AVM Abdul Yekini Bello (rtd) as new rector on 1 March 2022.

== History ==
The International Aviation College, Ilorin (IAC) was established in 2011 by the Kwara State Government through a public-private partnership with an aviation consulting firm. The college is located along Airport Road in Ilorin, close to the Ilorin International Airport. The IAC is an aviation training institution in Nigeria. It is accredited by the Nigerian Civil Aviation Authority (NCAA) and the International Civil Aviation Organization (ICAO). The college is also a member of the African Association of Aviation Training Organizations (AAATO).

== Courses ==
The college offers a variety of aviation courses, including:

- Private Pilot License Airplane (PPLA)
- Private Pilot License Helicopter (PPLH)
- Commercial Pilot License Airplane (CPLA)
- Commercial Pilot License Helicopter (CPLH)
- Flight Dispatcher Course (FDC)
- Instrument Ratings
- Multi-engine Ratings
- Night Ratings
- Air Traffic Control (ATC)

== Achievements ==
- In 2014, the college was accredited by the Nigerian Civil Aviation Authority (NCAA).
- In 2016, the college was ranked as the best aviation college in Nigeria by the NCAA.

== Incidents ==
On 2 May 2019, a Diamond DA40 training aircraft with registration number 5N-BNH, belonging to the International Aviation College (IAC) Ilorin, crash-landed at the Ilorin International Airport. The aircraft was carrying two pilots, who were both unharmed. The incident caused panic within the airport and Ilorin community, and flight operations were affected for three hours. The state governor, Abdulfatah Ahmed, who was returning from Abuja, was delayed as a result of the incident. The Accident Investigation Bureau (AIB) was informed of the incident and investigated the cause of the crash.
