= Asa River =

Asa River may refer to:

- Asa River (Japan)
- Asa (Kazakhstan)
- Asa River (Venezuela) - see List of rivers in Venezuela

== See also ==
- Assa (river), a tributary of the Sunzha in Russia
