= Ilorin Emirate =

- Traditional state
- Location in Nigeria
- Coordinates: 8°30′N 4°33′E
- Country: Nigeria
- State: Kwara State

Government
  - Emir: Ibrahim Sulu-Gambari

The Ilorin Emirate is a traditional state based in the city of Ilorin in Kwara State, Nigeria. It is largely populated by the Yoruba-speaking people, though the kingdom is a hybrid state due to the influence of the many other tribes that make up the city.

== History ==
The first settlers in Ilorin were Yoruba from old Oyo, then the Baribas also came and lived there for many years and considered the area their own; they left with no known reason. Then came another Yoruba named Ojo Isekuse, he was a Yoruba hermit, who lived by the sharpening stone where hunters gathered to sharpen their wares. Ilorin was named after the sharpening stone which still exists today. Ojo Isekuse allegedly left after committing incest with his daughter, and another family named Asaju settled near the sharpening stone. It was after the Asajus that numerous people settled in different independent hamlets around the area called Ilorin today.

At the start of the 19th century, Ilorin had substantial Fulani, Hausa and Yoruba populations. Afonja, an Oyo warlord, who fled to avoid a suicidal war commissioned by the then Alaafin of Oyo found his way to Ilorin. An Islamic scholar, Salih Janta, popularly called Shehu Alimi because of his Islamic knowledge, also found his way to Ilorin from Oyo because of persecution by the Ogboni cult. He moved to Ilorin from Oyo with some Yoruba Muslims.

In approximately 1810, Shehu Alimi and Afonja form alliance to repel the punitive forces of Oyo. Oyo intended to punish Afonja's rebellion and also get rid of the Islamic scholar who was gaining Yoruba converts. Shehu Alimi sought help from Sheik Usman Dan Fodio, who sent Jama'a force to Ilorin to aid his friend. In the initial conflict, Ilorin's forces successfully repelled the Oyo forces. However, the Alaafin decided to retaliate with a larger force aimed at suppressing Afonja's rebellion and eliminating Shehu Alimi. In a preemptive move, Ilorin's forces attacked and burned down Oyo-Ile, the capital of the old Oyo Empire.

Ilorin continued to expand southward with a lot of resistance, in the 1830s Yorubas fought the emirate which was made up of the ranks of Fulanis, Yoruba Muslims, and Hausas in the Battle of Ogbomosho, which was a decisive Ilorin emirate loss. However, Ilorin's southward expansion effectively ended in 1838 when Ibadan, an Oyo successor state decisively defeated Ilorin in the Battle of Òsogbo. The Ilorin cavalry were ineffective in the jungle to the south, and by the 1850s Ibadan had access to guns from European traders on the coast. Ilorin, as a part of the Sokoto Caliphate, maintained ongoing interactions with other Yoruba states while being situated in the midst of northern and southern Nigeria. These interactions encompassed various aspects, including frequent conflicts as well as continuous exchanges in terms of commerce and culture.

After Shehu Alimi's demise, there was a tussle for the rulership of Ilorin, a young and burgeoning town. The alfas wanted to establish an Islamic Caliphate based on knowledge, while Afonja was planning on establishing his rule, but Abdulsalam, a son of Shehu Alimi, emerged with the help of the Jama'a, being the biggest military presence in Ilorin. Afonja was killed during the reign of Abdulsalam when a brawl broke out between the Yoruba forces and Jama'a caused by the masquerade of Afonja. Masquerades were banned in Ilorin because of that incident. Ilorin became an emirate of the Sokoto Caliphate under the authority of Gwandu. There were multiple unsuccessful attempts by Yoruba's, and Yoruba allies to regain, and or expel Fulani's from Ilorin, such as Battle of Pamo, Battle of Ogbomosho, Battle of Ilorin, Mugbamugba war. The strategic location of the emirate between the north and south bestowed upon Ilorin a unique significance, which persisted even after the Caliphate throughout the colonial and post-colonial eras. Ilorin was brought under the northern Protectorate through diplomacy and applying minimal force considering the political situation of the state then.

=== Slavery and social intercourse ===
Ilorin was a major center of the slave trade, Richard Henry Stone who spent 6 years in Yorubaland describe Ilorin as such

“Ilorin boasted the largest Slave market in that part of Africa. The Yorubans who lived in the town as subjects of the Emir were mostly Pagans and had little social intercourse with their haughty masters, and they were secretly cherishing at that time a burning desire to free themselves from the Foolah yoke”.

In the past, slaves had mainly been sent north across the Sahara, but now they were being sent south via the Yoruba lands to the coast to supply demand from the US, the West Indies, and Brazil. Leading to the civil wars, left a lot of Yoruba subject to slavery.

== Rulers ==
Rulers of the Ilorin Emirate:

Start	End	Ruler
1824	1842	Abdusalami dan Salih Alimi
1842	1860	Shita dan Salih Alimi
1860	1868	Zubayro dan Abdusalami
1868	1891	Shita Aliyu dan Shittu
1891	1896	Moma dan Zubayru
1896	14 January 1914	Sulaymanu dan Aliyu
1915	November 1919	Shuaybu Bawa dan Zubayru
17 February 1920	June 1959	Abdulkadir dan Shuaybu Bawa
30 June 1959	1992	Zulkarnayni Gambari dan Muhammadu Laofe Dan Bawa "Aiyelabowo V"
1992	August 1995	Mallam Aliyu dan Abdulkadir
1995	Till Date	Ibrahim Sulu-Gambari

== Kingmakers and sub-chiefs of Ilorin ==
Due to Ilorin's unique history, it has a kingmaking tradition that is a blend of traditions taken from both sources. Whenever the throne of the emirate (which is vested in the Fulani descendants of Shehu Alimi) is vacant, the representative of each quarter in the Emirate namely; the Balogun Gambari (Hausa), the Balogun Ajikobi (Yoruba), the Balogun Fulani (Fulani) and the Balogun Alanamu (Yoruba) - along with the head of the Afonja chieftaincy family, the Mogaji Aare, and his sub-chief called the Baba Isale of Ilorin - come together to elect and install a new emir, subject to the approval of the governor of Kwara State. The longest reigning of the four Baloguns is then conferred with the Balogun Agba title, which makes him the second in command to the Emir of Ilorin. All of the Baloguns have districts which they administer on the emir's behalf.

There are also traditional chiefs that are each known as Daudu (or District Head). They serve as lieutenants representing the emir in towns across the Ilorin Emirate such as Afon, Bode Saadu, Ipaye and Malete, among others.

== Honorary titles in the emirate ==
The Emirate has witnessed the conferment of honorary titles to outstanding sons of the Emirate by the current Emir. The following are titles that have been conferred;

- Waziri of Ilorin Emirate
- Turaki of Ilorin Emirate
- Zanan of Ilorin Emirate
- Dan Iyan of Ilorin Emirate
- Grand Mufti of Ilorin Emirate
- Madawaki of Ilorin
- Malami Ubandoma of Ilorin Emirate
- Tafida of Ilorin Emirate
- Shettima of Ilorin Emirate
- Mutawali of Ilorin Emirate
