= Mugbamugba War =

19th-century battle in Kwara State, Nigeria

Date	19th century
Location	Ilorin 8°30′N 4°33′E
Result	Decisive Sokoto Caliphate / Fula victory

Belligerents
Yoruba Alliance. Monija king of Rabbah	Alimi, Fula chief Sokoto Caliphate

Commanders and leaders
Monija King of Rabbah	Alimi

Strength
Unknown	Unknown

Casualties and losses
Heavy	Minor

The Mugbamugba War was the second attempt of Yorubas to expel the Fulas and recover Ilorin.

Following a brief pause, the Yorubas regrouped and were determined to rid their land of the marauding Fula forces known as the Jamas. They formed an alliance with Monjia, the King of Rabbah, seeking his assistance in eliminating the common threat. The conflict occurred between March and April, coinciding with the ripening of locust fruit. The region had already suffered from the aftermath of previous wars, leaving many towns desolate and fields uncultivated. Both the besiegers and the besieged faced scarcity as there were no provisions in Ilorin's farms, forcing them to survive on locust fruit (igba). Consequently, the war was named Mùgbámùgbá. Unfortunately, the Yorubas were unsuccessful in this expedition as they struggled to contend with the Fulas' expertise in cavalry warfare. Recurring defeats eroded the Yorubas' morale, while the Ilorins grew more confident with each victory. In open fields, the Ilorins easily overcame the Yorubas, and within walled towns, they subjected them to prolonged sieges and famine. During this conflict, the Ilorins tactically attacked their allies. Concealing their horses behind the allied armies, a group of Ilorin horsemen engaged them from the front, while the main body of the cavalry suddenly descended from the rear, routing the allies. Monjia hastily retreated to his own country, leaving the Yorubas vulnerable to the victorious Ilorins. Seizing the opportunity, the Ilorins pursued their victory, sweeping through towns in the direction of Ofa, Erin, Igbona, among others. The Olofa, accompanied by his wise Ilari, Asegbe, managed to escape to Ikoyi.

This battle was narrated, and written down by the accredit Yoruba historian, Samuel Johnson the History of Yorubas.

== See also ==
- Battle of Ogele
- Battle of Pamo
- Battle of Ilorin
- Sack of Old Oyo
