= Afonja =

Military leader of the Oyo Empire

- Rank: Are-Ona-Kakanfo
- Children: Pasin

Afonja of Ilorin (c. 1750s – c. 1813) was the Are-Ona-Kakanfo (supreme military commander) of the Oyo Empire. His great-grandfather Laderin founded Ilorin city.

Laderin's son Pasin, a powerful warrior, was perceived as a threat by Basorun Gaha due to his rising influence. Pasin was subsequently driven into exile and killed, after which his son Alugbin became Baale. Following Alugbin death, Afonja assumed leadership. These four individuals—Laderin, Pasin, Alugbin, and Afonja—were the only Yoruba baale in Ilorin.

== Aole Arogangan ==
Aole was installed King after the death of Abiodun in 1789. He was Abiodun's cousin. A tall and handsome man but a weakling. Afonja had a strong kinship relation with Aole because he was born at the palace of Alafin. This began the Cold war between Aole (Awole) and Afonja as they started to be suspicious of each other. During his reign, evil and wickedness pervaded the whole of the Oyo Empire. The rights of citizens were taken away, cruelty, treachery were order of the day. People were confiscated and taken into slavery at slightest offense. The poor groaned and the leaders tyrannical and despotic. Oaths were no longer taken in the names of gods because the gods were considered too lenient and ineffective. It became, "may the King's sword destroy me."

During Aole reign, there were constant problems. After his installation, as was the customs, he was asked to name his enemy for his first expedition. Aole named a town market called Apomu. At that time, it was a market patronized by people from Oyo, Ife, Owu and Ijesa. The market was in Olowu territory. It was at the market, Aole, who was then a private citizen, sold his very close friend into slavery. When it came to the attention of the Apomu village-head that an Oyo citizen had been sold, he sent out order and Aole's friend was bought back, which angered him. When Baale of Apomu found that war had been declared against his domain, he had to commit suicide so he could save his village. His head was cut off and taken to King Aole to appease him.

Again, the Majesty was asked to name his enemy. Aole then named Afonja, the Kakanfo of Ilorin. It happened Afonja forcefully demanded and took the Kakanfo title after the death of Oyabi. In 1796, a plan was hatched to have Afonja lead war against, Iwere, an in-penetrable kingdom. Iwere was also the maternal home of late King Abiodun. Afonja became aware of the conspiracy against him so, in alliance with, Basorun Asamu Agba-o-lekan and Owota of Oyo, they turned against the King; besieged Oyo city for several weeks and sent an empty covered calabash to the King, which meant he had been rejected and had to commit suicide.

== Adebo ==
After the death of Aole who reigned for seven years, Adebo was installed King. Oyo Empire began to unravel from thence. Adebo was more a nominal King, without real authority to function, as many kingdoms under Oyo began to assert their independence. The King's authority lost steam. The King began to lose the people's respect. The people no longer respected or feared the King's Messengers. Inhabitants of Oyo city became the butt of jokes for the people. There was chaos and disorderliness; fights over rights; powerful chiefs turned their arms directly at the people to increase their wealth and fortunes.

Opele, the Baale of Igbogun was the first to secede from the Oyo Empire; followed by many lesser chiefs. He immediately formed his army and took Igbo-owu and Idofian. He was killed while attempting to conquer Igboho. According to S.Adebanji Akintoye, it was the failure of Oyo-Mesi to select Afonja as the Alaafin of Oyo that forced him to decide to establish a similar dynasty with Ilorin as the capital while Oyo-ile would become another town with her king subject to the new dynasty with him at the head. So to achieve this, he declared independence from Oyo. Afonja decided to completely whittle down the powers of Oyo. His first step was to expand Ilorin from a small town into a big city- capital. He co-opted towns within the vicinity of Ilorin such as, Kanla, Ganmo, Idofian, Elehinjare, Oke-Oyi, Igbon, Iresa Ibare, and others. To gain military powers, he invited Alimi, his priest, a Fulani Moslem, to Ilorin. Alimi responded by relocating with all his Hausa slaves to Ilorin and they were recruited into Afonja soldiers. Afonja also invited Solagberu, a rich Yoruba friend, who moved to the outskirts of Ilorin – a large compound called Oke Suna.

About 1817, Afonja offered freedom and protection to Muslims and slaves facing persecutions in Oyo country if they would flee to Ilorin. Many Hausa slaves ran to Ilorin and were protected from their masters. A lot of them were so angered by what they went through with their Oyo masters they voluntarily joined Afonja's army greatly swelling his military. They were mostly from (Hausa, Nupe, Bariba, Aja and Fulani). Solagberu, brought under his leadership, Muslims, from Gbanda, Kubajo, Agoho, Kuwo and Kobe. All these were all Moslems and they considered themselves separate from the pagans. These periods marked the beginning of religious war, Jehad, in Yorubaland. They called themselves, Jamas (a Hausa word for the rank and file, as distinguished from the leaders). They had distinctive marks, Kende, a sign of brotherhood, with which they greeted and recognized themselves.

The third major step taken by Afonja towards building his formidable army was to co-op all major military commanders under him as the Kakanfo. The most important were Toyeje, the Baale of Ogbomosho who led Afonja's right wing with his own army and Fagbohun, the Baale of Jabata, who commanded his left wing. Each of these commanders trained their home armies whom they brought under Afonja as the Kakanfo supreme command.

Ojo Agunbambaru, one of the few sons of Basorun Gaha, who fled to Bariba, heard what had become of Oyo. He decided it was an opportunity to avenge the death of his father and obtain his title. He came to Oyo with his large army of Bariba soldiers and put to death many of the Oyo Chiefs, including those he considered Afonja loyalists. Ojo conscripted large foot soldiers from many Yoruba kingdoms and set off against Afonja military. He was almost completed victory when, Adegun the Onikoyi, a secret friend of Afonja, suddenly deserted him. This gave an unexpected victory to Afonja. Ojo and his loyal Bariba army withdrew back to Bariba country. The fame of Afonja greatly increased as a result of this victory. Many from far and near offered their services to him.

King Adebo declared war against Gbogun town. As the war continued, he died in his sleep. He ruled for one hundred and thirty days. Prince Maku became King.

== Maku ==
Maku was installed King after Adebo. Afonja was not informed of his installation. He led a military campaign against Iworo kingdom and was defeated. He escaped to Iwo town and had to commit suicide as he was told no Yoruba King survived defeat.

== Fall of Afonja ==
Afonja became the sole power. He allowed the Kings and chiefs to manage their affairs by themselves. But his Jamas became marauders; stealing and ravaging the people's properties. Slaves, who ran from their owners to join Afonja's Jamas would return to oppress former masters who had treated them badly. No one could complain about these excesses for fear of reprisal. Afonja became haughty and larger than life. He failed to notice the evil his Jamas were perpetrating on the people; and even when he was warned of their ambition, rapine and lawlessness he refused to amend. Then the Jamas began ill feelings and disaffection against him. When Afonja realized the great danger of the Jamas, it was already too late. Even when he threatened to disband them, they simply continued the evil they were perpetrating on the people. His words became nothing to them. Afonja, had already created many enemies and few friends for himself. He was hated by many of his high-powered chiefs; former friend Solagberu of Oke Suna and Alimi, his priest because of his haughtiness and ego. When he decided to destroy the Jamas, they got wind of it and been led by Alimi, they attacked Afonja and his few loyalists. As they besieged him in all walls of his house, he made desperate call to Solagberu for help, but no help arrived. According the S.A. Akintoye, Solagberu must have disregarded Afonja's call for help been a Muslim chief, he would consider it haram to help Afonja defeat fellow Muslims. Afonja was killed and burnt to ashes. Alimi, the Fulani priest, took over leadership at Ilorin. Afonja would be remembered as the Kakanfo who foreclosed the dismemberment of the Yoruba country. But Professor Ade Ajaye argued that Alimi never arrived Ilorin until 1820s, when Oyo was already declining. Accounts of Afonja are found in the writings of Samuel Ajayi Crowther and Samuel Johnson.

Ilorin came under the rulership of Fulanis. They were invited as friends and allies, but they were more astute than the Yorubas. They studied their weaknesses and misrule. According to Samuel Johnson (1921) " Their more generous treatment of fallen foes and artful method of conciliating a power they could not openly crush, marked them out as a superior people in the art of government."

== First attempt to retake Ilorin ==
The death of Afonja was very bitter for the Yoruba people. They became afraid it was a matter of time before the Fulani occupy the whole of Yorubaland, so they decided to form a formidable army under the leadership of Toyoje, the Baale of Ogbomosho who became the new Kakanfo. But the astute and discerning Alimi, already suspected this and was already fortifying himself and his Jamas to when the time came. He has studied the Yorubas and knew how to undercut them. The Yorubas encamped at Ogele but the Fulani army with their horses, assisted by Chief Solagberu of Oke Suna, a powerful Yoruba Moslem; routed the Yoruba army.

== 2nd Attempt - Mugbamugba War ==
The Yoruba forces came together again to attempt to recover Ilorin. The war was fought during the month of March and April when the locust fruits (Igba) were out. There was famine at the time since wars prevented farming. The Fulanis who were experts in cavalry, routed the Yorubas and Monjia, the King of Rabbah, who joined forces. This was the last war fought by Alimi the Moslem Priest. He was succeeded by Abudusalami, his son, who was installed the first King or Emir of Ilorin. This was the beginning of Emirate in Ilorin; and the Gambaris (Hausas) who formed the bulk of the Jamas were afforded home.
