= Ilorin =

Capital city of Kwara State, Nigeria

- Metropolis and emirate seat
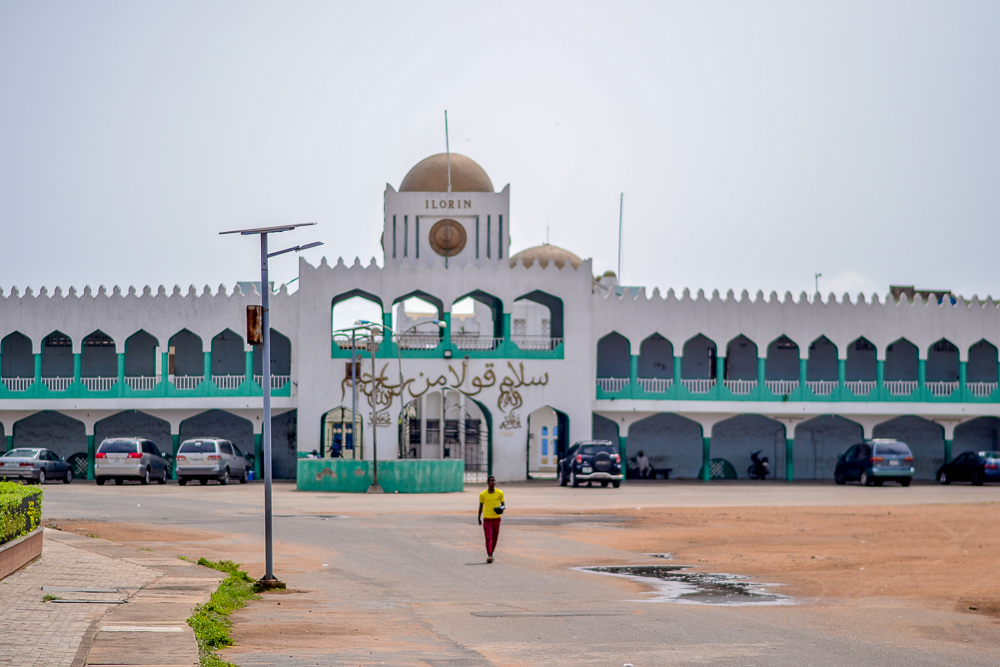
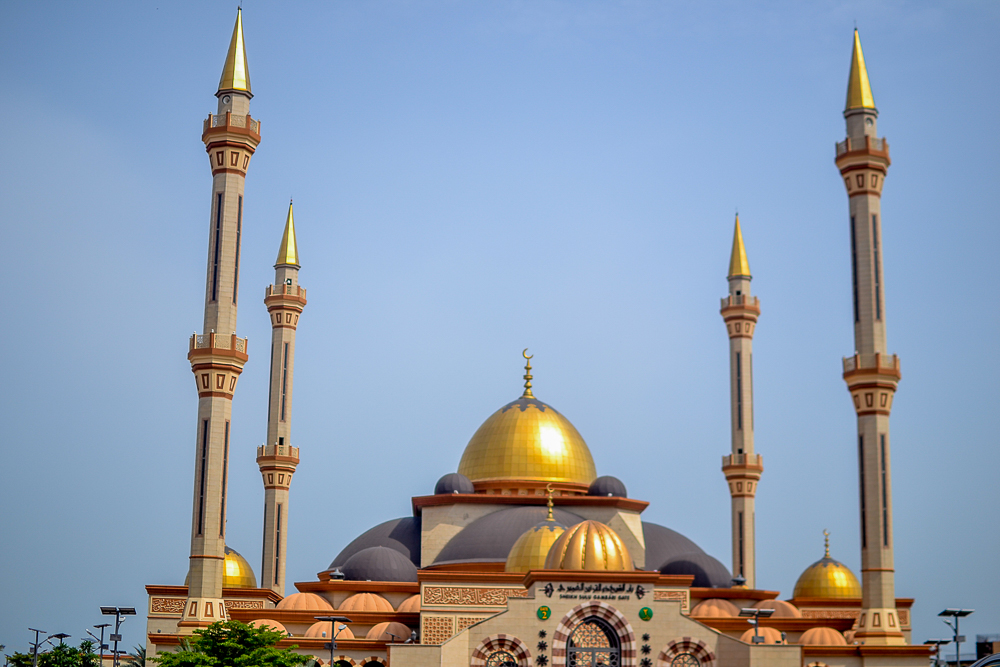
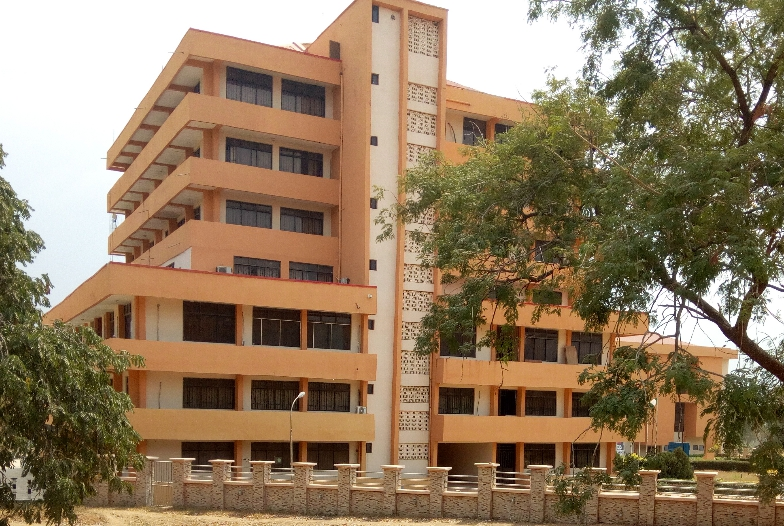
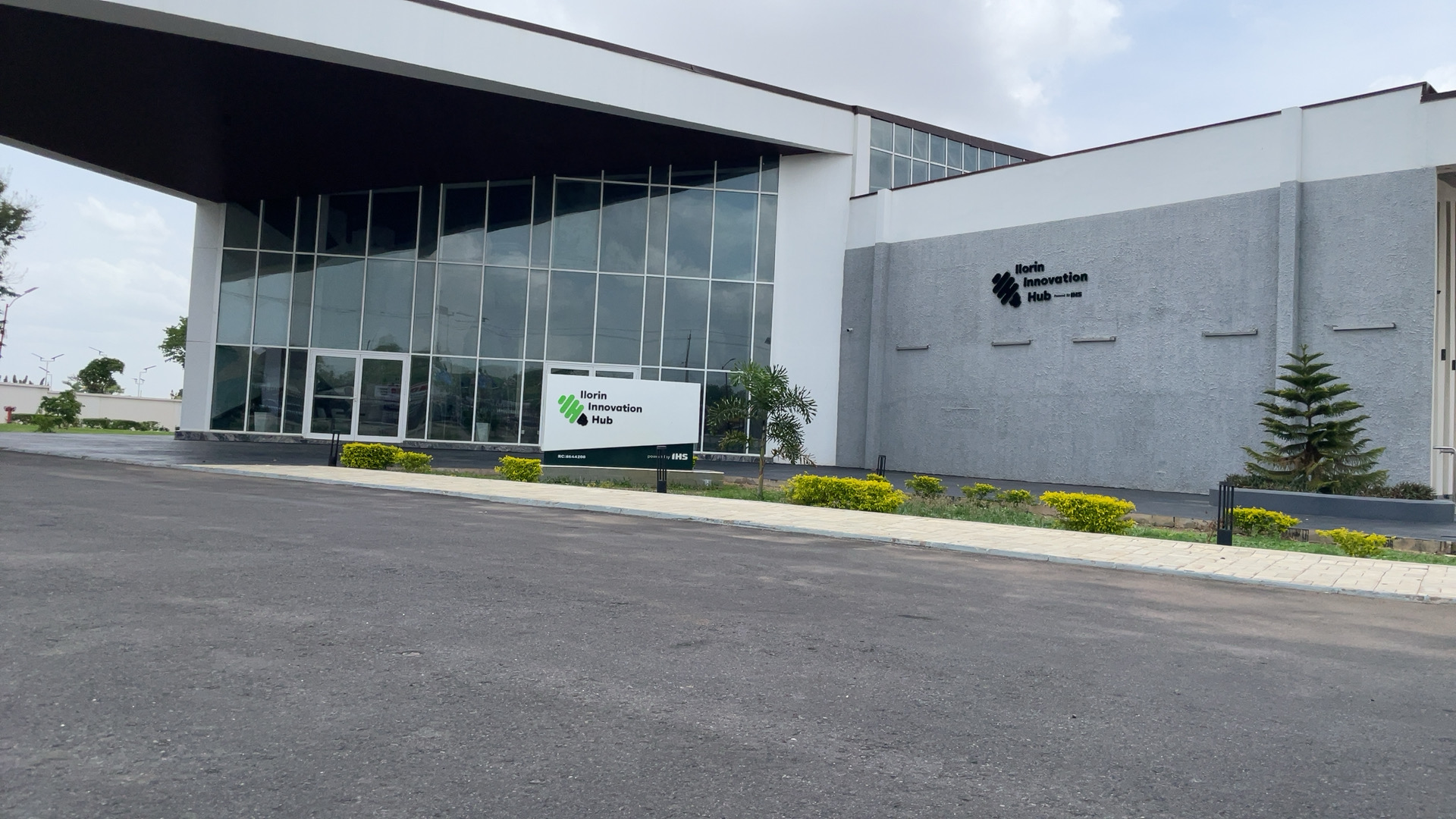
- Emir of Ilorin's palace Ilorin Central Mosque Senate Building, University of Ilorin Ilorin Innovation Hub

- Location in Nigeria
- Coordinates: 8°30′N 4°33′E
- Country: Nigeria
- Geopolitical zone: North Central
- State: Kwara
- LGA(s): Ilorin East; Ilorin South; Ilorin West

Government
  - Emir: Ibrahim Sulu-Gambari (since 1995)

Area
  - Metropolis and emirate seat: 765 km^{2} (295 sq mi)

Population (2006 census)
  - Metropolis and emirate seat: 777,667
  - Estimate (2022): 1,173,900
  - Rank: 7th
  - Density: 1,188/km^{2} (3,080/sq mi)
  - Metro: 1.5 million (estimate)
- Time zone: UTC+1 (WAT)
- Postal code: 240001
- Climate: Aw

Ilorin is the capital city of Kwara State in the North Central geopolitical zone of Nigeria and the seat of the Ilorin Emirate, a traditional state within the former Sokoto Caliphate and now part of Nigeria's northern traditional institutions. Lying at the meeting point of Nigeria's northern savanna and the southwestern forest belt, about 300 km north-northeast of Lagos and 500 km from Abuja, it is a major hub for transport, trade and education. As of the 2006 census it had a population of 777,667, making it the 7th largest city in Nigeria.

Ilorin is ethnically and culturally plural. Its population speaks mainly Yoruba (the local dialect is known as Ilorin Yoruba), its ruling dynasty is of Fulani origin, and its history, Islamic scholarship, titles and festivals tie it closely to the Hausa–Fulani north. Scholars therefore describe it as a meeting point of north and south; the classification of the city as "northern" or "Yoruba" has been debated in academic and political writing, while its official administrative placement is North Central.

== Geography ==
Ilorin lies at about 8°30′N 4°33′E on the southern fringe of Nigeria's Guinea savanna belt, in the transitional "Middle Belt". The Ilorin Emirate is drained by several rivers and streams, the longest of which is the Asa; others include the Moro, Osin, Orere and Oyun. The city is administered through three local government areas: Ilorin West, Ilorin South and Ilorin East.

== History ==
=== Early settlement ===
Oral tradition holds that the area was settled for many centuries by successive groups. Tradition credits Ojo Isekuse, a hunter and blacksmith, as one of the early founders, and the city's name is popularly traced to okuta ilọ irin, the "stone for sharpening iron" (see Arts and tourism). By the 18th century Ilorin was a border settlement of the Oyo Empire, with a mainly Yoruba population and growing numbers of Hausa and Fulani immigrants.

=== Afonja, Shehu Alimi and the emirate ===
In the early 19th century Afonja, the Oyo Aare Ona Kakanfo (field marshal) stationed at Ilorin, rebelled against the Alaafin with the support of the Fulani scholar Shehu Alimi (al-Salih), a Muslim scholar and preacher who attracted students and followers from across the region. The alliance collapsed in a power struggle, Afonja was killed, and Alimi's eldest son Abd al-Salam became the first Emir of Ilorin, receiving a flag from Sokoto and bringing Ilorin into the Sokoto Caliphate as an emirate (traditionally dated between 1823 and 1831). This began a line of rulers from the house of Alimi that continues to the present.

Ilorin repelled an Oyo-led coalition, including Borgawa allies, at the Battle of Ilorin (c. 1835), an event that hastened the collapse of Old Oyo. The emirate's southward expansion was halted at Osogbo in 1840 by the army of Ibadan. Throughout the 19th century Ilorin was a major trading node between the Hausa–Fulani north and the Yoruba south and a noted centre of Islamic learning.

=== Colonial period ===
Ilorin resisted British rule but was occupied by the Royal Niger Company in 1897 and incorporated into the Northern Nigeria Protectorate in 1900, where it was administered as a province under the Northern Region until the region was broken up. In 1967 Ilorin became capital of the newly created Kwara State.

=== Scholarship on Ilorin ===
The most comprehensive local history is Ilorin: The Journey So Far (1994) by the historian Alhaji L. A. K. Jimoh, which documents the city's families, scholars and ethnic composition and remains widely cited. Jimoh notes that Ilorin was at one time peopled almost entirely by Yoruba and later absorbed many Hausa, Fulani, Nupe, Borno (Kanuri) and other migrant families through assimilation.

== Emirs of Ilorin ==
Ilorin has been ruled by eleven emirs, all from the house of Shehu Alimi. Sources differ on the exact dates of the earliest reigns; the table follows commonly cited lists.

No.	Emir	Reign
1	Abdulsalami (Abd al-Salam)	c. 1823/1831 – 1836/1842
2	Shitta	c. 1836/1842 – 1860
3	Zubair	1860 – 1868
4	Aliyu (Shitta)	1868 – 1891
5	Abdulsalami II (Momo / Momolosho)	1891 – 1895
6	Sulaiman	1896 – 1915
7	Shuaibu (Shuaib Bawa)	1915 – 1919
8	Abdulkadir	1919 – 1959
9	Zulkarnaini Muhammadu Sulu Gambari	1959 – 1992
10	Aliyu Abdulkadir	1992 – 1995
11	Ibrahim Sulu-Gambari	1995 – present

The 11th emir, Ibrahim Kolapo Sulu-Gambari (born 1940), a former Presiding Justice of the Court of Appeal, was installed in August 1995 and is permanent chairman of the Kwara State Council of Chiefs. The emirate has a system of kingmakers and titled chiefs (such as the Ciroma, Madawaki, Talba and Turaki) whose titles have been expanded by successive emirs.

== Demographics ==
Ilorin is inhabited mainly by Yoruba-speaking people, alongside Fulani, Hausa, Nupe, Bariba, Kanuri, Igbo and others; the traditional ruler is of Fulani heritage. Islam is the majority religion and shapes the city's institutions, though Christianity is widely practised, especially in the cosmopolitan parts of the city.

== Durbar and festivals ==
The Ilorin Durbar is the emirate's principal public festival. It is a procession of decorated horses and riders led by the Emir, held a day or two after Eid al-Adha (Ileya), and is part of the wider northern Nigerian durbar tradition seen in Kano, Katsina, Zaria, Sokoto, Bida and Bauchi. The modern durbar was revived under Emir Sulu-Gambari and has been held annually since 2018.

Typically the Emir rides out from the palace with hundreds of horsemen, high chiefs, royal family members and the state governor, receiving homage from the crowd; around 500 horses have been reported in recent editions. The event coincides with the traditional Bareke homage by the Emir to the governor. Venues have included the Baseball Park in Adewole and the Emir's palace. The 2025 edition drew visitors from many countries.

Other important observances include Eid al-Fitr, Mawlid (Maulud) and other Islamic festivals.

== Religion ==
=== Islam in Ilorin ===
Ilorin has been a centre of Islamic learning since the days of Shehu Alimi, and its scholars, Quranic schools and Chief Imams are central to civic life. The Ansarul Islam Society and the office of the Grand Mufti are prominent institutions.

==== Ilorin Central Mosque ====
The first Ilorin central mosque was founded in 1820 in the Agbarere area ("Ile-Elewa"), followed by another at Idi-Ape in 1835 during the reign of the first emir. In 1974 the ninth emir, Zulkarnaini Gambari, invited Grand Mufti Alhaji Muhammad Kamaldeen Al-Adabiy and Abubakar Sola Saraki to coordinate fundraising for a new central mosque. The foundation was laid on 30 April 1977 by the Emir of Gwandu on behalf of the Sultan of Sokoto, and the mosque was opened in 1981 by President Shehu Shagari. It was renovated and expanded in 2012 under the eleventh emir and recommissioned on 14 December 2012. It has 99 domes, a large gold-finished central dome, and four minarets about 150 feet high.

=== Christianity ===
The city has a long-established Christian community with Catholic, Anglican, Methodist, Baptist, Cherubim and Seraphim, Celestial Church of Christ, ECWA, Redeemed Christian Church of God, Deeper Christian Life Ministry, Living Faith Church, Gofamint and Seventh-day Adventist congregations. Many mission churches founded schools whose approaches were later adopted by Muslim schools. The Church of Jesus Christ of Latter-day Saints has had a presence since 1992, and a district was organised in 2018.

A minority practise traditional religions.

== Education ==
Ilorin is a leading educational centre.

- The University of Ilorin (Unilorin), a federal university founded in 1975 as a university college affiliated to the University of Ibadan, with Professor T. N. Tamuno as first principal and Professor Ladipo Akinkugbe as its second principal and first vice-chancellor. It has more than 50,000 students and one of the largest campuses in Nigeria.
- Al-Hikmah University and Kwara State University, Malete
- Kwara State Polytechnic
- Kwara State College of Education, Ilorin and Kwara State College of Arabic and Islamic Legal Studies, Ilorin
- International Aviation College, Ilorin
- Emmanuel Baptist College, Muhyideen College of Education, Federal Training Center, Ilorin, Michael Imoudu Institute for Labour Studies, National Centre for Agricultural Mechanization, Agriculture and Rural Management Training Institute, School of Nursing and Midwifery, Ilorin

Secondary schools include Government Secondary School, Ilorin (founded 1914), Ilorin Grammar School, Ilorin, Federal Government College Ilorin, Ansarul Islam Secondary School, Bishop Smith Memorial College, Mount Carmel College, Ilorin, Saint Anthony's Secondary School, Socrates College, Ilorin, IQRA College, Ilorin, Unilorin Secondary School and U.M.C.A High school, Ilorin.

== Commerce ==
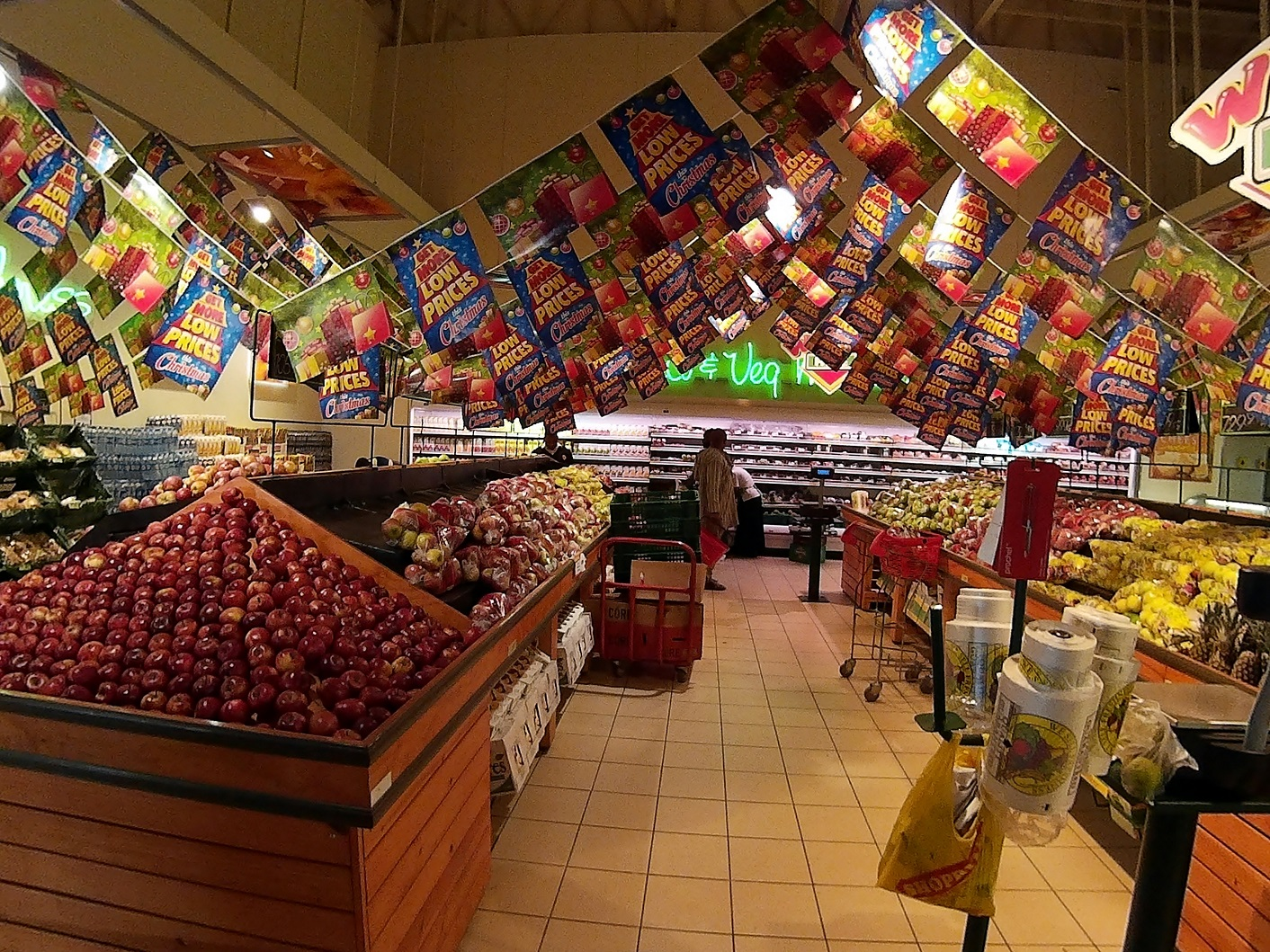
ShopRite Ilorin

Kwara State has extensive agricultural land and mineral deposits including limestone and dolomite (Oreke), kaolin and clay (Idofian), gold (Kaiama and Patigi area) and tantalite (Iporin). Ilorin is the centre of cashew processing in Nigeria; Olam International operates a large cashew plant there. Industries include Dangote Flour Mills, Tuyil Pharmaceutical, KAMWIL, Golden Confectionate Food Industries, Chellaram motorcycle assembly and Rajrab Pharmaceuticals.

== Transport ==
Ilorin is served by road, rail and air. Ilorin International Airport has scheduled domestic flights and cargo facilities. Roads link the city to Lagos, Ibadan, Abuja, Kaduna, Niger, Kogi, Plateau and other states. Intra-city transport includes taxis (painted yellow and green), commercial motorcycles (okada) and tricycles (keke).

== Climate ==
Ilorin has a tropical savanna climate (Köppen Aw), with a rainy season from about April to October, a dry harmattan season, and annual rainfall of roughly 1,000–1,400 mm. March is typically the hottest month.

Climate data for Ilorin (1991–2020)
Month	Jan	Feb	Mar	Apr	May	Jun	Jul	Aug	Sep	Oct	Nov	Dec	Year
Mean daily maximum °C (°F)	34.0 (93.2)	35.8 (96.4)	36.1 (97.0)	34.4 (93.9)	32.4 (90.3)	30.8 (87.4)	29.3 (84.7)	28.7 (83.7)	29.7 (85.5)	31.4 (88.5)	33.8 (92.8)	34.1 (93.4)	32.5 (90.5)
Mean daily minimum °C (°F)	19.7 (67.5)	22.3 (72.1)	23.7 (74.7)	23.6 (74.5)	22.8 (73.0)	22.1 (71.8)	21.8 (71.2)	21.4 (70.5)	21.5 (70.7)	21.7 (71.1)	21.3 (70.3)	19.4 (66.9)	21.8 (71.2)
Average precipitation mm (inches)	5.7 (0.22)	8.5 (0.33)	42.0 (1.65)	110.0 (4.33)	194.9 (7.67)	202.7 (7.98)	175.7 (6.92)	169.2 (6.66)	297.3 (11.70)	176.3 (6.94)	13.9 (0.55)	5.5 (0.22)	1,401.7 (55.19)
Source: NOAA (WMO Normals 1991–2020)

== Arts and tourism ==
- Okuta – the stone at Idi-Ape quarters, associated with Ojo Isekuse, said to have been used to sharpen iron tools; its name okuta ilọ irin is the traditional origin of "Ilorin".
- Sobi Hill – a hill said to have sheltered residents during wars.
- Pottery – Ilorin has some of the largest traditional pottery workshops in Nigeria (Dada in Okelele, Oju-Ekun, Okekura, Oloje and Ita Merin).
- Aso-oke – hand-woven textiles produced across the city.
- Kwara State Council for Arts and Culture, Esie Museum, Metropolitan Park and the Kwara State Stadium complex.

== Sports ==
Ilorin has an 18,000-capacity stadium. Kwara United F.C. play in the Nigeria Professional Football League and ABS FC in the Nigeria National League. The city also has a baseball field and has hosted national handball competitions.

== Environment ==
In September 2019 a heavy downpour caused flooding in parts of Ilorin, including Obbo and Unity roads. Refuse collection has also been a recurring public-health concern.

== Notable people ==
- Ibrahim Gambari, diplomat and scholar of the Alimi family
- Bukola Saraki, former Senate President and Turaki of Ilorin
- Ibrahim Sulu-Gambari, 11th Emir of Ilorin
