= Alara of Ilara-Mokin =

Nigerian royal title

Alara (Yoruba: Aláá) is the royal title of the king of Ilara-Mokin land in Nigeria. The Alara may be addressed as Oba, like rulers in other Yoruba kingdoms, or as His Royal Majesty. Alara is also known to be unquestionable (Yoruba: kábíyèsí), with an authority that is said to be next to the gods (Yoruba: alásẹ ìkejì òrìsà).

== History ==
The first Alárá of Ilara-Mokin was Ọbalúfọ̀n Modulua Olutipin, who was also known as Obalufon Alayemore (some sources identify the Ọbàlùfọ̀n here as Obalufon Ogbogbodirin. According to oral history, Ọbàlùfọ̀n fled from Ilé-Ìfẹ̀ called Ará (meaning family or relative) (hence why Ilara is named Ilara, "The one who has many relatives") along with other people and fellow leaders such as Ajígun Ọlọ́fin after being deposed by Oranmiyan. There, Ọbalufon established many settlements and towns in what is now the Ekiti region. Among those towns were Ìlárá. Upon Obalufon's departure, he placed his son Àyájọ́ on the throne as the second Alárá.

The name Alárá comes from the phrase, "oní ará," meaning, "The leader of the family," referring to the original place where the people of Ìlárá-Mọ̀kín originated from. Kings of other towns in the Ekiti and surrounding regions also founded by Ọbalufon also use the title Alárá, such as Alárá of Arámọkọ-Èkìtì, Alárá of Ará (in Osun State).

Because Ilara-Mokin became a part of the Akure Kingdom in the 19th century, the Alara answered to the Déjì of Akure and had to pay homage, tribute, and was not permitted to wear a crown. He was regarded as a, "baálẹ̀," even though historically, the Alara was regarded as a king in his own right. This continued into the absorption of Ilara into Colonial Nigeria. When Nigeria gained independence, the Alara was elevated to a monarch (Ọba), and beginning with Alara Ojopagogo, the Alara was allowed to wear a crown.

== Ruling Houses ==
Ilara-Mokin has two royal houses, Agbekorun and Afunbiokin (houses, whom were originally one royal dynasty before being split by the descendants of Alara Agbekorun, Iyata I and Alara Afunbiokin, Agbesa I, who were both male line descendants of the second Alara, Ayajo. The Kingship thus alternates between the two houses. The current monarch is a member of the Agbekorun House, and is a direct descendant of Oba Agbekorun.

== Accession Process ==
A council of 9 or 12 chiefs called the Kingmakers, "Afọbajẹ," headed by the Lisa of Ilara-Mokin, have the traditional power to enthrone the king, with the aid of the Ifa. The Lisa or another Chief Ifa priest often performs the Ifa rituals needed to consult the god Ọ̀rúnmìlà regarding who was the best candidate to become King. The royal house that is due to rule presents a series of princes who become candidates to the throne. Once the Kingmakers select the King, he is put through a series of rituals based on the Ìṣẹ̀ṣe religion of the Yoruba people, before he is presented to the people and crowned.

== Today ==
His Royal Highness, Oba Abiodun Aderemi Adefehinti is the king of Ilara-Mokin, he ascended the throne on 17 July 1998.

== List of Alaras ==
Tenure	Incumbent	Notes
c.1400s	Founding of current Ilara-Mokin ruling dynasty	
14th century	Ọbàlùfọ̀n/Ọbànìfọ̀n Modúlúà (Olútipín), Alara	In Ilara-Mokin oral history, a man by the name of Olutipin, who is said to be the same person as Obalufon Alayemore (the king of Ife), is the first king of Ilara-Mokin. Obanifon and his descendants are associated with the founding of many Ekiti towns. He was a son of Obalufon Ogbogbodirin, the Ooni of Ife. His maternal line was associated with the towns of Oba-Ile and historic Ara in Ekiti town. Upon being overthrown as king of Ife by Oranmiyan, he fled east to his maternal homeland in Ekiti, founding a town called Ilara. He then moved north after a war with the people of Oranmiyan, and ruled as king of Efon-Alaaye, before returning to the throne of Ife. His son was placed on the throne of Ilara after his departure, in a location referred to as "Upoole" Obanifon is still worshipped as an ancestor deity in Ilara-Mokin.
late 14th century	Àyájọ́, Alara	Allegedly the son of Obalufon Olutipin, he said to have become ruler of Ilara after his father fled north to Efon-Alaaye. It was during his reign that the people of Ilara-Mokin moved south and broke away from the people of Aramoko-Ekiti.. Previous king lists in Ilara do not mention Ayajo, but note Obanifon to be succeeded by his three sons, Olugbo, Itakiki, and Eyinmirin. These kings are now attributed to be sons of Ayajo in modern king lists. Furthermore, the lack of any modern cult of worship surrounding Ayajo is strange given the fact that Obalufon, and the aforementioned sons of Ayajo are prominent deities. During his reign, he is attributed to establishing the worship of the orisha worshipped in Ilara-Mokin, including Olofin (representing his deified ancestor Oduduwa), his father Obanifon, and Ifa.
14th century	Ògbólúmodù-Ifá, Alara	Alleged brother of Ayajo. He is not noted in previous Ilara king lists, and the existence of an "Ogbolu" as the third king of Akure kingdom may suggest a potential conflation by Akure descendants who migrated to Ilara. He is attributed with being a weak king who engaged in several wars during his reign, and was blamed for Ilara's strife, and he died in battle.
15th century	Olúgbó, Alara	Son of Ayajo, previous king lists note him as the most prominent of Obanifon's sons who ruled Ilara. He was a powerful and admired king who is noted to have organized Ilara's main clans, Ujagba which consisted of his Iare chiefs who are the main custodians of the deities and festivals of Ilara-Mokin and Ugbeyin, consisting of Olugbo and his brother's descendants and closest advisors (Osogbon). The other clans, Udofin and Oke-Awo, migrated in the 19th century from Ekiti towns like Awo-Ekiti and Ado-Ekiti. Olugbo was deified upon his death as the chief royal deity, and is still worshipped by his descendants in the Ugbeyin clan.
15th century	Èyìnmirìn, Alara	Son of Ayajo, stated to be an older brother of Olugbo who was passed over for the throne. He succeeded his brother and had a short reign, but lived to be quite old.
15th century	Ìtákítí Òwúnrìn, Alara	Youngest son of Ayajo. Last of the ancient kings of Ilara to be deified
1500s	Aráyàgbókùn, Alara	Son of Olugbo
1500s	Ariyunbole, Alara	Son of Itakiki
1500s	Ọ̀gbarúgbóde/Ògbórígbóde Alara	Probably a son of Eyinmirin
late 1500s	Ògìdì Lóògùn (Òkè-bí-ọ̀run-ò-sí), Alara	Son of Ariyunbole
1600s	Òtìtì (Eléwù-Oògùn), Alara	
1600s	Atakorogbáun, Alara	Descendant of Olugbo
mid-1600s	Ògìdìgìdì Lóògùn II, (Atẹ́rí Ìrókó Múdàkọ (A-tẹ́rí-ìrókò-mú-dàkọ)), Alara	Son of Ogidi Loogun I
c.1680-c.1695	Oyelekan (Ọ̀bọ́yè Léèkàn), Alara	Son of Ogidigidi Loogun II. He is the last Alara to succeed his father. His great-grandson became Alara Agbekorun.
c.1695-c.1720	Adéyẹyè (Agbérùọlà g'ọtapuru), Alara	Great-grandson (or great-great grandson) of Eyinmirin
c.1720-c.1737	Ẹlẹ́sìnmìrìn Egbeke, Alara	Grandson of Alara Atakorogbaun.
c.1737-c.1745	Adétómilúyì, (Alataoji Ori), Alara	Possibly a son of Adéyẹyè?Very little is known of his reign.
1745	Apẹ́lóyè bí Awùkalẹ̀, Alara	Reigned for a few days
c.1745-c.1765	Ajíperí Ìgbodò (Ìgodò), Alara	Son of Adeyeye I and descendant of Eyinmirin. His reign began relatively peaceful but became war-torn when the Akure Kingdom, ruled by Ogoro, and supported by the Benin Empire, invaded and conquered Ilara-Mokin. He died in the war, an event preserved in the Agogo ritual. Large portions of the people of Ilara were either killed, enslaved by other peoples, or migrated north to other Ekiti towns. Thus, Ilara-Mokin's population as well as historic political and aristocracy class was largely lost, with only a few families still remaining. Through Ajiperi's grandson Fadulu, he has an extremely large number of descendants that make up most of the modern members of the clan of Odo-Ugbeyin, and thus the royal family of Ilara-Mokin.
c.1765 to c.1815	Àgbékọ́rùn (Ìyatà I), Alara	His predecessor Ajiperi's son Aderibido was initially believed to be the next king, but his breech of a taboo disqualified him, causing a succession crisis ensued. Furthermore, the destruction of Ilara by past wars made it so there were no very few eligible princes willing to ascend to the throne. Thus, Agbekorun, a great-grandson of Oyelekan, was chosen at the age of 3. The remaining chiefs of Ilara served as regents until he came of age. Agbekorun ruled for at least 55 years, becoming the longest reigning Alara. He is the progenitor of one of the current royal houses of Ilara-Mokin, Agbekorun. During his reign, the people of Ilara moved further into the forest and were rather disjuncted. He and the people of Ilara first moved to a place called Otaate, and then they were driven to a place called Adebulu. He had many children who constitute descendants of several clans in Ilara. The Akure-Benin war occurred during his reign, and many Akure people fled to Ilara during this time. He was removed from the throne after his long reign because of growing dissatisfaction with his long reign.
c.1815-c.1828	Afúnbíọ̀kín (Àgbéṣà), Alara	Great-grandson of Alara Elesinmirin. He was the son of Agunbiade, who in turn was a son of an Ugbeyin prince named Ojo Aladegbami. Prince Ojo Aladegbami was a son of Alara Elesinmirin. He was selected for Alara after the long reign of Agbekorun, who was then removed from the throne. Afinbiokin and the people of Ilara were then driven to a place called Agbesa, where Afinbiokin died.
c.1828-c.1850	Olókùndùgbà (Agúnsóyè), Alara	Eldest son of Agbekorun. He was a very influential king, who initiated an open-door policy that invited many migrants to settle in Ilara, providing them with expansive land and chieftaincy titles. This caused a large increase in the population of Ilara. The people of Ilara moved east and settled along the Apomu river, before arriving in their present location around c. 1830-1835. They were granted permission by the Deji of Akure (likely Deji Osupa) to settle on the land, which was the land of Akure settler villages of Ipote, ruled by the Akapote, and Ijado, ruled by the Ajagun. Agunsoye also established a new clan of Ilara-Mokin during his reign, led by a prince from Awo-Ekiti and Ado-Ekiti, Olatiire, in c.1830. Agunsoye's sister was given in marriage to Olatiire. He made many strategic marriages with his children and relatives and has many modern-day descendants.
c.1850-c.1860	Ọ̀ṣúntúyì (Ọ̀dúndún), Alara	A younger brother of Agunsoye, and son of Agbekorun. He was a powerful warrior, and rumors suggest he killed his older brother Agunsoye. It is believed that this contributed to his relatively short reign.
c.1860-1918	Ifámorítiyé (Òpókìtì "Baba Akáyé-jo-bí-eó"), Alara	A paternal grandson Afinbiokin. His father was the Chief Saya. He was the first male child to be born in Ilara-Mokin's present location in c.1830. He was Alara during Kiriji War, as well as the arrival of British colonization and Christianity in 1897. He died in 1905, after ruling for nearly 50 years. During his reign was the establishment of cash crops such as cocoa, coffee, and oranges.
1918-1937	Adébùmítì (Òkérùkù Agúnlóko-bí-òyìnbó), Alara	Nephew of Oba Opokiti (his father, Olumirakun, was an older brother of Opokiti), and paternal great-grandson of Afinbiokin. He cooperated with the spread of Christianity and Western Education to Ilara-Mokin.
October 18, 1937 - 1959	Àdàmú Aládégbohùngbé (Arójòjoyè Adélétejiteji), Alara	Born in c.1880 as a son of Alara Opokiti. He was the first Muslim Alara, and the first king to ascribe to a foreign religion. He contested with his younger brother Philip Pojo for the throne. He was a very popular king in the beginning of his reign. In late 1949, Adamu, encouraged by his subjects and emboldened by his descent from the great king Obalufon (who is associated with the beaded crown), believed he should be allowed to wear a crown. Alaa Adamu thus had a beaded crown made, defying the instruction of the colonial administration, and wore it to a meeting of local kings. This was believed to be offense to the ruler of the Akure Kingdom, Adesida I, the only monarch allowed to wear a crown in the area. This led to the Akure crisis in which the Deji threatened war on Ilara. On July 19, 1950, under the instruction of the Akure Native Authority, he was forced to go into exile, where he went to Ilesa, where his mother was from, for "disturbing the peace of his kingdom." Despite his exile, he enjoyed widespread support from the people of Ilara, who saw the efforts of the Deji and the people of Akure as tyrannical. Because of this, and that he did not voluntarily abdicated the throne, the kingmakers of Ilara refused to crown a new king. Unsuccessful efforts were made by the Deji of Akure to have him permanently deposed and install an Akure-sympathetic prince, Philip Pojo. Adamu returned from exile on August 26, 1957 upon the death of Adesida I in June of 1957, much to the joy of his people, and died two years later. He was also allowed to retain his crown after his return from exile.
1960 - October 16, 1994	Solomon Adubi Ojopagogo (Afunbiokin Adeyeye II), Alara	Born in 1923, he was the first Christian Alara. He was a police officer in Asaba before being called to the throne. The main contestant of the throne was an Akure-sympathetic prince, Philip Pojo, and so the elders of Ilara wanted a neutral candidate. His rise to the throne was made possibly by support from Iare chiefs such as the Lisa and Obaala of Ilara-Mokin and John Ayanfe Ajayi. Ojopagogo was a member of Eyinmirin ruling house, one of the ancient ruling houses of Ilara-Mokin, through his father, Thomas Ojopagogo. He was not related to any of the previous monarchs that had ruled for the past 150 years. His father was a son of Fatoyinbo, who was a son of Chief Fadulu, the Sasere of Ilara-Mokin. Fadulu was a son of Aderibiro, the eldest son of Alara Ajiperi. Ojopagogo's mother was from Akure, and was distantly related to the Deji of Akure. Ojopagogo started off as a very popular king, but ran into issues with accusations of tyranny and intimidation of those who didn't support him. In the 1960s, Ilara-Mokin's three royal houses, Olugbo, Eyinmirin, and Itakiki, were changed to Afinbiokin and Agbekorun, since Olugbo, Eyinmirin, and Itakiti were ancient figures who also were regarded as deities. This posed a problem to Ojopagogo as Ojopagogo was not a descendant of the new ruling houses, but that of Eyinmirin, but attempts to remove Ojopagogo from the throne were unsuccessful. Ojopagogo adopted the Afinbiokin house as his own ruling house, even though he was not a descendant of Afinbiokin. Ojopagogo was widely beloved for his promotion of festivals and cultural activities in Ilara Mokin Kingdom. Ilara-Mokin grew in population during his reign, and his long reign saw the arrival of electricity, running water, and many amenities to Ilara-Mokin. He ruled until his death in October 1994.
July 15, 1998–present	Abiodun Aderemi Adefehinti (Agbekorun II), Alara	Born on December 31, 1939 as the youngest son of Chief Daniel Adefehinti and Jolaade Adegunlehin of Odo-Ugbeyin, he succeeded his second cousin once-removed Alara Ojopagogo as king. Alara Aderemi was formerly President of the Egbe Omo Ilara-Mokin, and was chosen because of his successful career as an accountant. Alara Aderemi is descended from the Agbekorun ruling house and a descendant of Alara Ajiperi Igodo. On his paternal line, he is a great-grandson of Alara Agbekorun. In that line, he is also a cousin to the Deji of Akure Odundun II, through his great-grandmother Fatile (who is the maternal grandmother of Alara Aderemi's father and Odundun II's maternal great-great-grandmother). On his maternal line, he is a grandson of Chief Adegunlehin. Adegunlehin was a paternal grandson of Alara Agúnsóyè, and thus a great-grandson of Alara Agbekorun (who is the father of Agunsoye). Adegunlehin was also a maternal grandson of Chief Fadulu (through Fadulu's daughter Oluawihanmi), and thus Alara Aderemi is a maternal line descendant of Alara Ajiperi. Alara Aderemi has overseen a continued explosion in population in Ilara, as well as significant development, but has faced controversy, disapproval, and threats of removal for his refusal to participate in traditional rites as a "born again Christian"

== See also ==
- Nigerian traditional rulers
- Timeline of Ilara-Mokin
