= Odundun I =

Nigerian monarch

Ọ̀dúndún I

38th Deji of Akure
- Reign: 1882–1890
- Coronation: 1882
- Predecessor: Ojijigogun I
- Successor: Arosoye I
- Born: Aládélúsì Oṣùpá Aṣọdẹ́bóyèdé c. 1835; Benin City
- Died: 1890 (aged 54–55); Akure
- Burial: Akure
- Spouse: Adeke (m. 1882) Ifámùgbẹ̀ẹ of Ikota (m. 1883)
- Issue: Omoba Ogunlade, Omoba Adegbite, Omoba Ajari, and many other sons and daughters
- House: Osupa (Odundun and other descendants)
- Dynasty: Asodeboyede
- Father: Osupa I
- Mother: Ọ̀bọ́wẹ̀
- Religion: Yoruba religion

Odundun I, otherwise known as Ọ̀dúndún asòdedẹ̀rọ̀ (Yoruba: Aládélúsì Oṣùpá Aṣọdẹ́bóyèdé; c. 1835 - 1890) was a Yoruba monarch. He ruled the Akure Kingdom from 1882 until 1890.

His lineal descendants are today known as the House of Osupa. They serve as one of Akure's two legally recognized royal families.

== Early life ==
Oba Odundun I was born as Prince Aladelusi in Akure around the year c.1835, as a member of the Asodeboyede Dynasty. He was the son of Oba Osupa I, who ruled Akure from 1834 until 1846, and through him claimed hereditary kinship with all of the preceding rulers of both Akure and the neighbouring kingdoms of Ijeshaland and Ikereland, and Olori Ọ̀bọ́wẹ̀, from the town of Ado Ekiti. He had many half-siblings from both his mother and his father. His mother was married twice previously, where she had two sons (Ọ̀tẹ́kùn, with the chief Ọ̀bẹ̀lé, and Fátúyọ̀lé with the chief Sáò Òsọ́nà). His only full biological sibling was his older brother Adéẹkùn. His brother Orímọlóyè was his older-half brother, who he later competed for the throne in 1882, Orímọlóyè was only older than him by a day. He had only one full biological sibling but several maternal and paternal half siblings. Because Oba Odundun I was later able to become king, under the omo-ori-ite rule in place (before it was repealed in 1991), a prince could only become king if they were born during the reign of their father. Because Odundun's father began his reign in 1834, he would have had to have been born after that. About 3 decades before his birth, in 1818, the Kingdom of Benin had invaded his father's homeland and executed Oba Arakale, his paternal great-grandfather. The invaders spared his father however, who lived in Benin City for a long period of time before returning to Akure after becoming king.

== Reign ==
His father became king in 1834 and reigned till his death in 1846. Odundun married several wives and had many children, with some born before and during his reign. His first wife upon his rise to the throne was Adeke, he inherited her from his predecessor, Ojijigogun, and they had one son, Ogunlade (grandfather of the current Deji, Odundun II). Another son of his was Prince Adegbite. With his wife Ifamugbee from the Akure village of Ikota, he had one son, Oliyaa.

In 1882, the Deji of Akure, Oba Ojijigogun – who was his great uncle (as the younger brother of his father) – died. This created a vacancy in the office, and several eligible princes sought the throne, including Odundun and his cousins, the three sons of the deceased king: Arosoye, Ifaturoti, and Olofinlade. Oba Odundun was selected and crowned shortly afterwards.

One of the main things Oba Odundun I did was to sever the ties between Akure and Benin. When his father had become king in 1834, Akure began to pay a yearly tribute to the Benin Kingdom, and had continued doing so until Oba Odundun refused to pay it any longer. It is said that the officers that were sent to enforce control of Akure were oppressive and often raped and killed the people that they met there, so when Oba Odundun heard of this, he refused to pay the tribute anymore. Benin was unable to react at the time, as they were fighting against the British occupation that would eventually culminate in the Benin Expedition of 1897. Akure legend has it that through Odundun's power, he was able to kill the Oba of Benin, Adolo, who died in 1888. This act gave the Oba his oriki "Asodedero," which means One who makes the town peaceful.

Oba Odundun was known to be a brutal and ruthless tyrant, and is often compared to King Henry VIII of England, in that he swiftly executed one of his wives for sharing a joke with him in the bathroom. Another one of his wives, Olori Ifámùgbẹẹ̀ from the nearby village of Ikota whom he married at the beginning of his reign, fled the palace in 1887 to the town of Ilara-Mokin because of his cruelty due to her childlessness. After visiting a babalawo in the town, she returned to the palace where she had a child the next year, Oliyaa.

== Death and legacy ==
Oba Odundun I died in 1889 or 1890 at around the age of 55. After this, his father's direct lineage wouldn't produce another monarch for the duration of the succeeding century. His cousin Oba Arosoye became king, and when he died Prince Olofinlade, who had competed for the throne with him in 1882, succeeded. He ruled for the following 60 years as Oba Adesida I, thus establishing the Adesida dynasty that ruled Akure for 100 consecutive years. In the early 1990s, the Osupa family was recognized as one of the official ruling houses of the Akure Kingdom by the military administration of Ondo State through the efforts of Dr. Adebimpe Ige Ogunleye, (the head of the Osupa ruling house until his death in 2025), and a descendant of Odundun's father Osupa, and other elders of the royal house. It has since provided two further monarchs, including current incumbent Oba Odundun II.

Another one of his descendants include his great-grandson Ogunlade Aladetoyinbo Aladelusi, who later became the Deji of Akure, Oba Odundun II, the current king.

== See also ==
- Oba of Benin
- Ogiso
- Akure Kingdom
