= Aladetoyinbo Ogunlade Aladelusi =

- Deji of Akure
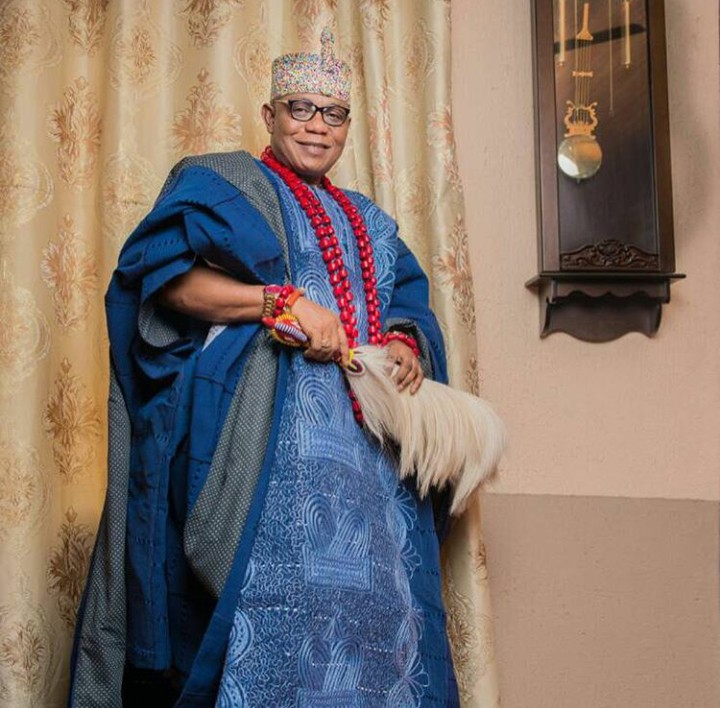
- Odundun II shortly after being crowned

47th Deji of Akure
- Reign: 17 July 2015 – present
- Predecessor: Oba Afunbiowo II
- Born: Patrick Bankole Aladetoyinbo Ogunlade Aladelusi; 28 December 1956 (age 69); Ayede-Ogbese, Akure, Nigeria
- Spouses: Olori Olajumoke Aladetoyinbo; Olori Abimbola "Bimbo" Aladetoyinbo (née Akintide), amongst others
- Issue: Prince Dr. Ademola Aladetoyinbo; Prince Engr. Kole Aladetoyinbo; Princess Wunmi Aladetoyinbo; Prince Adegoke Aladetoyinbo; Princess Aderinsola Aladetoyinbo
Regnal name
- Odundun II
- House: Osupa/Odundun
- Dynasty: Asodeboyede
- Father: Prince Ogunlade Aladetoyinbo
- Mother: Princess Omowunmi Aladetoyinbo (née Adedipe)
- Occupation: Architect; Real Estate Developer; King

Oba Aladetoyinbo Ogunlade Aladelusi, Odundun II, is a Nigerian monarch. He is the 47th and current traditional ruler of Akure Kingdom, a traditional state in Akure, the Ondo State capital. He was proclaimed Deji of Akure in 2015, taking the regnal name Odundun II and succeeding the deceased Oba Adebiyi Adegboye Adesida.

== Early life ==
Prince Patrick Bankole "Kole" Aladetoyinbo Ogunlade Aladelusi was born on 28 December 1956, in the nearby Akure settlement of Ayede-Ogbese, to the Baale, the Alayere of Ayede-Ogbese, Prince Ogunlade Aladelusi Aladetoyinbo and Princess Omowunmi Aladetoyinbo (née Adedipe) (1926-2018), a member of the notable Adedipe family that bear the Elemo chieftaincy title in Akure. He is the third of ten children. He started his elementary education at St. Patrick School, Aponmu Akure. He then proceeded to Oyemekun Grammar School Akure where he received his secondary school certificate (SSCE). He graduated as an Architect from Florida State University in Miami, Florida.

== Professional career ==
He is a prominent member of the Nigerian Institute of Architects. He is also one of the founding members of Architects Registration Council of Nigeria (ARCON). Oba Aladetoyinbo has a master's degree from Morgan State University in Baltimore, Maryland, USA. He has given public lectures in higher institutions like Obafemi Awolowo University and Adekunle Ajasin University regarding the role of youth in governance.

== Selection and coronation ==
Oba Aladetoyinbo was selected from the Osupa royal family of Akure, amongst indigenes who were also heirs to the throne on 17 June 2015. He received his staff of office on 17 July 2015. His era has been described as an ‘Epoch of Peace'. Oba Aladetoyinbo is the spiritual leader of the Akure people now saddled with the responsibility of making supplications to God and the Òrìṣà on behalf of his clan and the world at large during annual festivals such as the Ogun festival and the Ulefunta.

== Personal life ==
Oba Odundun II is the current head of the Osupa/Odundun Royal Family, one of the cadet branches of the Royal House of Asodeboyede. The other branch is the Ojijigogun Royal Family. Both branches are descended from two of Oba Arakale's children. Like many African kings, Odundun II is polygamous and has at least 4 wives. He has at least 5 children. He is a direct male-line great-grandson of Oba Odundun I, great-great grandson of Oba Osupa I, and a 3rd great-grandson of Oba Arakale. His great-grandfather's first cousin (his first cousin thrice removed) was Oba Adesida I. He is a third cousin once removed of musician King Sunny Ade.

Through his mother, Princess Omowunmi Aladetoyinbo (née Adedipe), he is related to the notable Adedipe family of Akure, who have held the Elemo chieftaincy for over 2 centuries. His maternal grandfather was Okira Adedipe, who was a son of Chief Adedipe Oporua Atoosin (1819-1916). Through this same Adedipe family, he is also a second cousin of Chief Olu Falae. He is a first cousin of the current Elemo of Akure, Chief Olusegun Okira (Adedipe VI). Through the mother of his great-grandfather Adedipe Oporua Atoosin, he also has roots in the Yoruba town of Ilara-Mokin. Odundun II is also a third great grandson of Oba Arakale through his maternal line, and Odundun II's parents were fourth cousins. He is the first descendant of the Adedipe family to be a King of Akure.

He married his first wife Olori Olajumoke Aladetoyinbo (born 1958) in 1986. Her father is from Imo state and her mother is from the Yoruba town of Idanre. They have 3 children. His second wife is Olori Abimbola "Bimbo" Omosalewa Aladetoyinbo (née Akintide). She herself is a great-granddaughter of Oba Adesida I, a great-great-great granddaughter of Oba Arakale, and thus a fourth cousin of her husband, Oba Odundun II.

His younger wives are Olori Kemisola Aladetoyinbo, Olori Oluwafunmilayo "Funmilayo" Titilayo Aladetoyinbo, and Olori Adetutu "Tutu" Aladetoyinbo. They married Oba Odundun II after he became king. Olori Funmilayo is known for her active community engagement in Akure and passed out COVID relief materials to people in Akure.

== Awards ==
In October 2022, a Nigerian national honor of Commander Of The Order Of The Federal Republic (CFR) was conferred on him by President Muhammadu Buhari.
