= Akure Kingdom =

Traditional state in Ondo State, Nigeria

- Traditional state
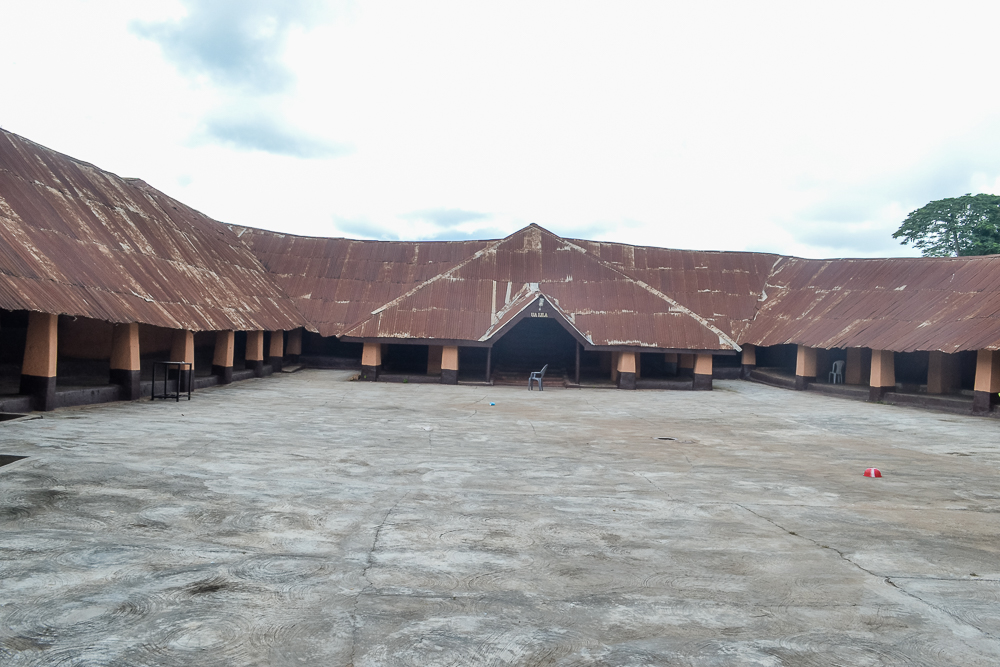

- Location in Nigeria
- Coordinates: 7°15′11″N 5°11′37″E
- State: Ondo State
- Founder: King Omoremilekun Asodeboyede

Government
  - Deji: Odundun II

The Akure Kingdom is a traditional state with headquarters in Akure, Ondo State, Nigeria. It is the successor to an ancient Yoruba city state of the same name. The ruler bears the title "Deji of Akure".

== Location ==
Akure is located in southwestern Nigeria. The climate is hot and humid, influenced by rain-bearing southwest monsoon winds from the ocean and dry northwest winds from the Sahara Desert. The rainy season lasts from April to October, with rainfall of about 1,524 mm (60 in) per year. Temperatures vary from 28 °C to 31 °C with mean annual relative humidity of about 80%.

== Language ==
The people of Akure speak the Akure dialect of the Yoruba language. As one of the historic kingdoms of the Ekiti subgroup of the Yoruba people, the Akure dialect is considered by most Yoruba linguistic research to be a subdialect of the Ekiti Yoruba dialect.

== Foundation ==
The region where Akure exists has been resided in for millennia; the Iwo Eleru skull was found in Isarun, a few miles from Akure town, and is evidence of ancient habitation. Thus, Akure as a settlement was founded before the arrival of Asodeboyede, likely around the time of the early Ife kingdom. Many small settlements, who were part of the early ancestors of the Ekiti people, were scattered where Akure is, including Upalefa, Igan, Odopetu, and Ileru. These settlements were autonomous and refused to be united as a single kingdom, as also happened in the early history of Ife. The ruler of Upalefa was Omoloju, who lived during the time of Omoremilekun, the founder of the Akure kingdom.

Oral tradition of the Akure Kingdom begins with the uniting of these communities by the founding of a new royal dynasty in Akure. The Akure kingdom was founded by a prince named Omoremilekun, son of Ekun, and a descendant of Oduduwa Omoluwabi, the royal progenitor associated with the founding of the Yoruba people. Omoremilekun was a brave hunter of elephants. He was part of the migration of royal descendants from Ile-Ife to various parts of what is now Yorubaland. It is believed he was in search of a place to settle after passing a strict test administered by Oduduwa himself. This test wherein he was kept in solitude for about nine (9) days is still annually commemorated in Akure today by the reigning king of the town during a ceremony known as 'Oba wo ilesunta'.

Omoremilekun was nicknamed "Aṣodẹboyèdé" (or The person who hunted and arrived with royalty), and like other descendants of Oduduwa in the Ekiti region, sought to annex and unite the various settlements who were already finding it difficult to agree among one another who was to be their leader. After defeating Omoloju and gaining the support of the indigenes, Asodeboyede was crowned the first Ajapada, or king, of Akure. The palace that was built to house him still stands and dates to 1150 AD, and was built equidistant between the three major settlements at the time. However, it is noted that Asodeboyede never wore royal beads, showing that a large portion of the early leadership of Akure refused to see him as the true ruler.

It is not Asodeboyede that is believed to have derived the name Akure. Oral tradition states that when Omoloju, the ruler of one of the pre-Akure settlements, was clearing farmland, the string holding the heavy royal beads on the leader's neck is said to have snapped, thus causing the people to exclaim "Àkún rẹ" (or The beads have snapped), this later becoming the name of the settlement they established on the site. Omoloju was nicknamed Alakure (the one who owns Akure). Over time, the phrase was whittled down through its constant use to become Akure. This etymology was mainly popularized by Akure king Adesida I, but other older ones exist. Omoloju then reigned in his own authority as Alakure, and upon the death of Asodeboyede regained control of the Akure kingdom and ruled as Ajapada for 20 years. However, upon Alakure's death, all successive kings were descended from Asodeboyede.

The Akure Kingdom came to be known as one of the 16 or so kingdoms of the Ekiti people. It was considerably influenced by the Benin Kingdom, and Akure served as a trading link between Benin and Ife. Akure also has a connection with the Ekiti kingdom of Ikere, in which several Dejis are claimed to have had Ikere mothers.

Originally, the kings of Akure were referred to as Ajapada. The title Deji of Akure started with Oba Ogunja (r.1533-1554), whose father, Oba Olofinleyo (r. 1434–1474) took the daughter of Oba Atakunmosa, the Owa of Ijeshaland, as one of his wives while the latter was on his way to Benin. By the time Oba Atakumosa was returning to Ilesha from the pilgrimage, his daughter Omoba Owawejokun had given birth to a son. While other dignitaries gave the little baby common gifts, Oba Atakunmosa was said to have presented his grandson with a small diadem. Owafadeji (i.e. Owa gave him a diadem) became the praise name of the young boy, and by the time he reached his adulthood it had become his de facto name. When Owafa'Deji became Oba, the appellation assumed a titular importance and because of his prominence as an Oba, subsequent Obas or kings assumed the title while the advent of the modern era has formally made Deji the official title of the Obas of Akure. However, the original title of Ajapada has remained a significant part of the Deji's ceremonial style until the present day.

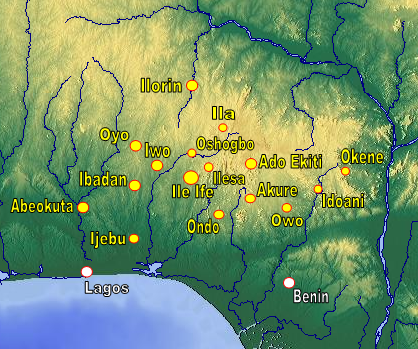
Historical Yoruba Cities. Akure towards southeast

== The Ado-Akure ==
During its long history, the city-state of Akure was at times independent, at times subject to other states. Due to this, there is now a sizable population of partial Bini descent within the kingdom. They are known as the Ado-Akure. Akure was the main base for Benin's trade in the area, and at times seems to have been considered within the western frontier of the Benin sphere of influence. The Ado-Akure were therefore originally something of a colony, and are said to be descended from Benin warriors and traders who took Akure brides upon settling in the kingdom.

The Benin historian Egharevba, who was himself a part of the Ado-Akure community, refers to suppression of resistance by "rebellious Akure" during the reign of Oba Ewuare of Benin (1440–1473), although the Deji was allowed to remain as a nominal ruler. Another rebellion is recorded a century later during the reign of Oba Ehengbuda of Benin. In the 19th century, Osupa I, according to one tradition the son of the Akure king Osuan and a Benin princess, ascended the throne of Akure. He subsequently gave the Ado-Akure land to settle and chieftaincies to hold. By the end of the century, the community was sufficiently influential enough for its chiefs to be signatories to a number of treaties that involved the Akure Kingdom.

== Later history ==
House of Omoremilekun Asodeboyede
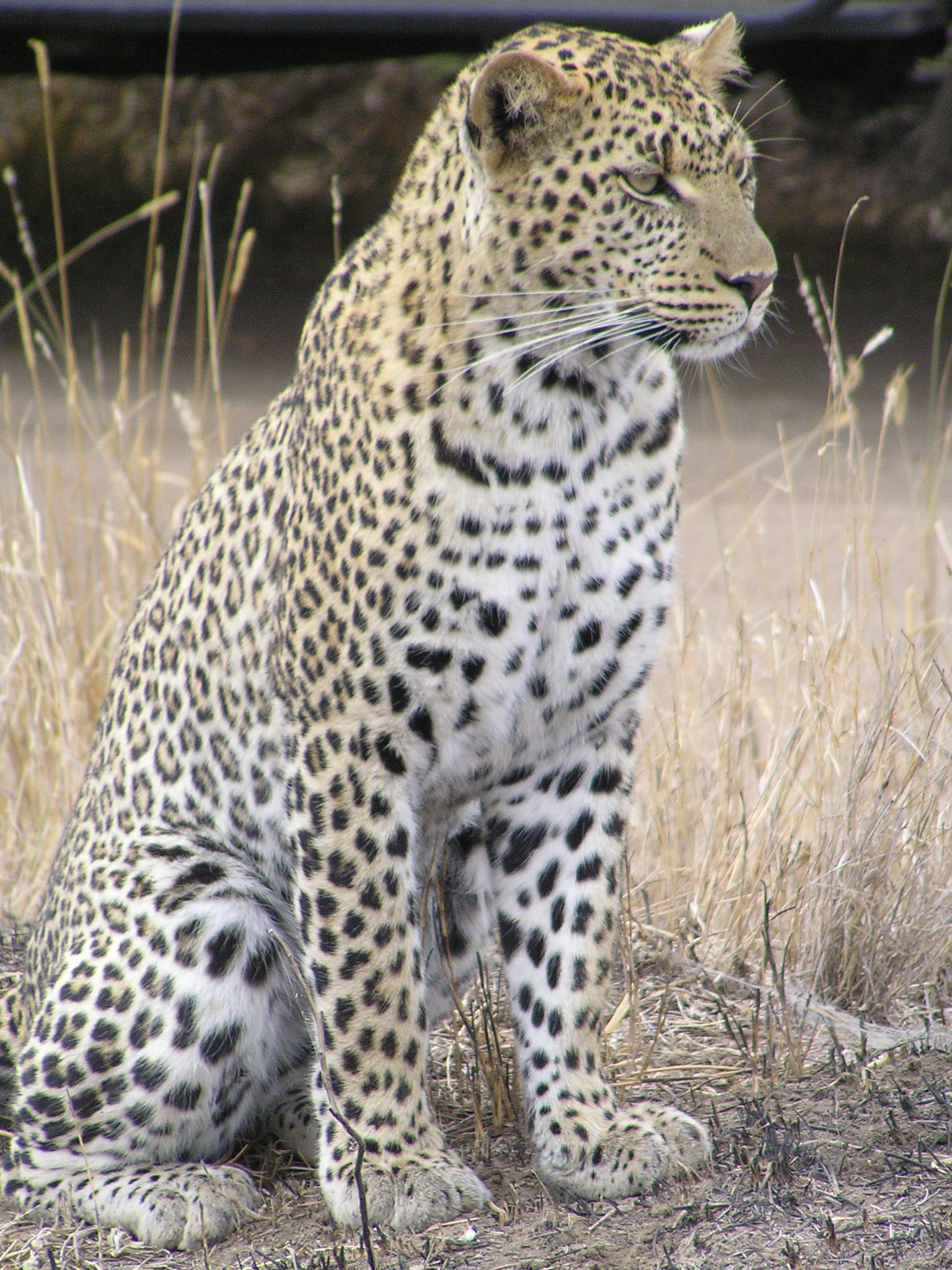
- Nigerian royal dynasty The Leopard, totem of Prince Ekun of Ile-Ife and heraldic beast of Akure royalty
- Parent house: Oodua
- Current region: Yorubaland
- Founded: c. 1150
- Founder: Omoremilekun Asodeboyede
- Current head: Odundun II
- Titles: Oba Deji of Akure; Ajapada of Akure; Adele of Akure; Oloye of Akure Omowas; Eyesorun of Akure; Omoba of Akure; Oloori of Akure
- Styles: Kabiyesi; Majesty; Royal Highness
- Members: Adebiyi Adegboye Adesida Afunbiowo II; Adesida I; Olu Falae; Sunny Ade; Osupa I; Odundun I
- Connected families: Ijesha royal family Bini royal family
- Traditions: Ifá; Christianity; Islam
- Motto: Omo Owa, Omo Ekun (Yoruba for "A child of the Owa, a child of the Leopard")
- Cadet branches: Ojijigogun; Osupa

Akure had regained its independence by the early 19th century, but around 1818 it was recaptured by Benin forces and the Deji was executed. This set in motion a chain of events that culminated in the reign of Osupa I. After 1854, Akure and other Ekiti towns came under the rule of Ibadan, which lasted until a rebellion in 1876 followed by a prolonged war between the Yoruba states.

Towards the end of the 19th century the British based on their Lagos Colony had established a protectorate over the area, although they ruled through "native" administrations. The British sought to combine the Ekiti kingdoms of the region into a single administrative unit, against resistance by the Ekiti people who preferred local autonomy. In 1899 Ekiti and Ilesha formed the northeastern division of the protectorate. In 1915, Ekiti, Owo and Ondo were combined to form the Ondo Province with headquarters at Akure. Ondo Province later became part of Western State. In 1976 the old Ondo State was formed, and in 1996 Ekiti State was split off from the modern Ondo State, which has Akure as its capital.

The death in October 1999 of Oba Ataiyese Adebobajo Adesida IV led to a prolonged dispute over the succession, eventually resolved with the appointment of Oba Oluwadamilare Adesina in 2005. Oba Oluwadamilare was dethroned on 10 June 2010 for sacrilegious misdeeds (wife beating) and Adebiyi Adegboye Adesida Afunbiowo II was chosen as the new Deji of Akure on 13 August 2010. His daughter, the Omoba Adetutu, was appointed princess regent following his demise on 30 November 2013.

== Structure ==
Akure's King is known as the Déjì of Akure and is supported by six high chiefs or iwarefa in his or her domain. The totem of Akure is the Leopard and the father of Omoremilekun Omoluabi was himself called Ekun (this was his regnal name). It is for this reason that every descendant of the Akure clan has been addressed by outsiders as Omo Ekun during the recitation of his or her praise poetry or, alternatively, as 'Omo Akure Oloyemekun', since Omoremi was said to have stayed for a while at Igbo Ooye before coming to the Akure region. After the death or removal of an Oba, a princess regent is appointed under the title of Adele, who is expected to oversee the day-to-day administration of the kingdom while the kingmakers select the next Oba from one of the royal houses.

Although the Oba has relocated to a more modern palace, the old building from 1150 AD is still used for all ceremonies. The place has over 15 courtyards, with each having its unique purpose. Ua nla, Ua Ibura, Ua jemifohun, Ua Ikomo are some of the names of the courtyards. For example, in the Ua ubura courtyard, oaths are taken, and the ua Ikomo is used for naming ceremonies.

In addition to those of the Deji and the Adele, other titles are also borne by Akure royals. The titles of the Oloyes of the Omowas, the Eyesoruns, the Omobas and the Olooris are either bestowed by the Deji (in the cases of the former two) or acquired upon birth or marriage (in the cases of the latter two). The Oloyes of the Omowas are the titular chief princes and princesses of Akure. According to tradition, they are expected to serve as leaders within the royal families. The Eyesoruns, meanwhile, are the nominal leaders of the female royals. There is usually only one Eyesorun at any given time and she is traditionally either the reigning Deji's mother, step-mother or ceremonial surrogate mother in the first instance, or his senior wife in the second one (where the Deji is himself a polygamous male). The Omobas are the rank and file princes and princesses, any of the many members of the Omoremilekun Asodeboyede dynasty. Lastly, the Olooris are women that marry into the royal families. Their number would consist of a male Deji's wife or wives, the wives of the male Oloyes of the Omowas, and the wives of the male Omobas.

There are two other communities with their separate kings, cultures and traditions beside the Akure kingdom. The more prominent of the pair is Isinkan, while the second of them is Isolo. The ruler of Isinkan is known as the Iralepo while that of Isolo is known as the Osolo of Isolo. In the olden days, the three communities (Akure, Isinkan and Isolo) were located some distances apart. The war with the Benin empire in the pre-colonial period necessitated that the three communities move closer together however, and they have occupied their current positions ever since. Other nearby towns include Isarun, Ilara-Mokin, Igbara-Oke, Iju, Itaogbolu, Idanre, Owo, Ikere and Ondo.

== Royal houses ==
Originally there was only one ruling house of Akure, Omoremilekun Asodeboyede, founded by the first king in the kingdom, Omoremilekun. The kingship passed down through an essentially ambilineal descent line (due to the fact that the kingdom had a few female monarchs). This continued well into the 19th century until the reign of Deji Adesida I. The 29th king, Oba Arakale (r. 1768–1818), who many sons, including, Oba Osuan (r. 1832–1834) and Oba Ojijigogun (r. 1852–1882). Oba Osuan's son was Oba Osupa I. Osupa I and Ojijigogun are the progenitors of the branches of the Asodeboyede ruling house, Osupa and Ojijigogun, that can produce a monarch. The main royal family of the Osupa house is Odundun, whose progenitor is Oba Odundun, one of Osupa's sons and an ancestor of the current Deji of Akure, Oba Odundun II. The three royal families of the Ojijigogun ruling house are Arosoye, Adesida, and Ifaturoti, two of which were founded by ruling kings of Akure. Omoba Ifaturoti never became king, but his progeny is nevertheless recognized.

The Adesida family's reigning representatives were Adesida I, commonly called Adeisda the Great (r. June 1897 - 1957), Ademuwagun Adesida (r. 1957–1973), Adelegan Adesida (r. 1975–1990), Adebobajo Adesida (r. 1990 - 1999) and Adebiyi Adegboye Adesida Afunbiowo II (r. 2010–2013). By the point when the Osupas were legally recognized in the early nineties, one Adesida or another had been ruling Akure for a little less than a century. As a result of this, the Adesidas ruled through some of Akure's most notable periods. These included the amalgamation and creation of Colonial Nigeria in 1914, Nigeria's independence in 1960, and the restoration of its democracy in 1999.

After the Adesida ruling family had ruled exclusively for many decades, descendants of Oba Odundun and Oba Osupa, such as Chief Olu Falae, petitioned the government to create a separate Osupa royal house for their descendants. This wish was granted with the legal recognition of the Osupa house in 1991. This also led to the removal of the omo-ori-ite rule, which stated that a prince or princess could only become monarch if they were born after their father or mother had become monarch. Because of this, grandchildren and great-grandchildren of past rulers - in the male line - could now vie for the throne. This allowed Oba Osupa III, a supposed "great grandson" of Oba Osupa, to become king. Many claim that Oba Osupa lied about his relationship with the king and therefore bought his way to the throne. After he was deposed, another descendant of the Adesidas, Afunbiowo II, ruled for three years, before being succeeded by the current ruler Oba Odundun, a member of the Osupa ruling family.

== List of Dejis and Adeles of Akure ==
Solomon's knot, a quasi-heraldic symbol of Yoruba royalty

This is a list of the rulers of Akure since its founding in 1150 C.E. by Asodeboyede, a great-grandson of Oduduwa, who was the progenitor of the Yoruba race.

As will be seen, the longest reigning king of Akure was initially Oba Arakale, who ruled for 50 years (1768–1818). He was later surpassed by his grandson Oba Adesida I Afunbiowo, who ruled for 60 years and is the longest reigning Deji in all of Akure history:

Start	End	Ruler	Notable events and achievements
1150	1180	Ọmọ́rẹ̀mílẹ̀kún Aṣọdẹbóyèdé Ajapada	Founder of the modern Akure kingdom. He conquered and overthrew the local ruler, known as Alakunre, and united the independent settlements of what is now Akure. Believed to be a prince from Ife and a descendant of Oduduwa
1180	1200	Ọmọlójú Alákùúrẹ́ (Alakunre), 2nd Deji of Akure	The ruler of what is now Akure before Asodeboyede arrived. Akure was not fully united and consisted of several closely connected but independent settlement. Omoloju was the ruler of the largest of the settlements, Upalefa.
1200	1225	Ògbólú, 3rd Deji of Akure (son of Asodeboyede)	He is believed to be a founding monarch and namesake of the town of Itaogbolu (literally meaning "Ogbolu's settlement")
1225	1245	Ọ̀dọ́rọ̀, 4th Deji of Akure (son of Asodeboyede)	Succeeded his half brother to the throne
1245	1261	(Sekungbola) Obasisan, 5th Deji of Akure (son of Asodeboyede)	
1262	1277	Obarisan, 6th Deji of Akure (son of Alakunre)	His name allegedly means "a bad king." Epidemics were said to plague Akure during his reign, and as a son of Alakunre, he would be the last descendant of Alakunre to reign in Akure. After his reign, only descendants of Asodeboyede reigned in Akure.
1277	1287	Ọ̀tẹ́móyè, 7th Deji of Akure (son of Ogbolu)	A great civil war occurred during his reign, but he was victorious
1287	1299	(Adégbàmígbé) Imolúmọdẹ, 8th Deji of Akure (maternal grandson of Ogbolu)	His father Imolu was from Ara-Ekiti. During an Akure invasion of Ara, Imolu was placed as king of Ara by the then ruling king, Ogbolu. After Ogbolu left, without his support, Imolu, was removed as king. Imolu then fled to Akure, where he was welcomed by Ogbolu, and was given his daughter as a wife. Adegbamigbe was their son, and when Adegbamigbe became king, he became known as Imolú ọmọ ọdẹ, in honor of his father.
1299	1305	Olarako, 9th Deji of Akure	Also known as Olokoroko. A fire during his reign destroyed most of Akure
1305	1313	Oja iyara, 10th Deji of Akure (son of Imolumode)	
1313	1363	Ọbágbèyí Adégbìtẹ́, 11th Deji of Akure (maternal grandson of the Oloba of Oba-Ile and a son of Otemoye)	His mother was the daughter of Olagboba, the Oloba of Oba-Ile. He is known for bringing the Aeregbe festival from Oba-Ile. Oba-Ile is an ancient town that borders Akure, and predates most settlements in the area.
1363	1393	Ògògà, 12th Deji of Akure (son of Obagbeyi)	His regnal name is also the title of the king of the town of Ikere-Ekiti. A hall in the ancient palace of the Deji of Akure is known as "Ua Ogoga," and traditionally when a new Ogoga is crowned, he returns to Akure to pay homage. He was an extremely powerful hunter.
1393	1419	Èyé Àró, 13th Deji of Akure (daughter of Obagbeyi Adegite)	First female monarch in Akure, likely succeeding her brother (or father).
1419	1434	Ẹlẹ́sẹ̀ Ọbayé, 14th Deji of Akure (son of Obagbeyi)	Said to be the one who introduced the Iwesu/New yam festival in Akure.
1434	1474	Ọlọ́fịnlẹ́yọ̀, 15th Deji of Akure (likely a son of Ogoga)	Noted to be a powerful warrior, hunter, but also said to be a prolific farmer in a place called Ìpàràpárá (now known as Òwódé). During his reign, the Oba of Benin Ewuare expanded his kingdom, and introduced raffia palms to the kingdom. In addition, it is believed that during his reign Atakunmosa, the king of Ilesa, visited Akure on his way to Benin. Atakunmosa gave Olofinleyo his daughter Aye's hand in marriage.
1474	1494	Ọlọ́fịnjógbàyàwó (Olofingbawo), 16th Deji of Akure (son of Eye Aro, the first female Deji of Akure)	His regnal name means "Olofin dances to receive a wife," apparently he was known for his dancing, and was often gifted a wife. He was also well versed in traditional medicine and charms
1495	1513	Ọbawáyé (Obawaiye), 17th Deji of Akure (perhaps a descendant of Ogoga)	
1513	1533	Ọbalúà, 18th Deji of Akure (son of Olofinjogbayawo)	
1533	1554	Ogunja, 19th Deji of Akure (son of Olofinleyo)	
1554	1576	Oba Alaya, 20th Deji of Akure	
1576	1599	Oríyá, 21st Deji of Akure (son of Obawaye)	
1599	1623	(Adésóyè) Àtàkúnmọ́sà, 22nd Deji of Akure (son of Ogunja, great-grandson of Atakunmosa of Ilesa)	He shares his name with the King of the Ilesa kingdom known as Atakunmosa. It is believed that on Atakunmosa's journey to the Kingdom of Benin, he stopped by Akure during the reign of Atakunmosa's grandfather Olofinleyo. Olofinleyo was given Aye, the king of Ilesa's wife. Olofinleyo later had Ogunja, who was the father of Adesoye. He took the name Atakunmosa in honor of his maternal great-grandfather. He is also regarded as being the first king of Akure to be known as the Deji. He expanded the extent of the Akure kingdom and established a close relationship with Benin.
1623	1648	(Olukimi) Eleyogbute, 23rd Deji of Akure	
1648	1678	(Adetimeyin) Gbogí, 24th Deji of Akure (son of Atakunmosa)	
1678	1705	Amayabekun (Adelakun), 25th Deji of Akure (son of Eleyogbute)	His mother was a daughter of Totookun, the ruler of Ijare. He allowed for the breakaway of several vassal towns of Akure
1705	1735	Èyémọ̀ị́n, 26th Deji of Akure (daughter of Gbogi)	The second female monarch, said to be a daughter of Gbogi. She was said to be quite ruthless and died at a place called Ogirio in Akure
1735	1748	Orúdú, 27th Deji of Akure (son of Gbogi)	He ruled in the town of Igbara-Odo before becoming Deji. His reign was noted to be bad and he was widely disliked. He failed to bring back the town of Igbara-Odo under the control of Akure, Igbara-Odo had gained independence during the reign of Amayabekun. He is also the first king to have abdicated the throne, frustrated by his inability to reconquer vassal towns, he left the throne and went to northern Ekiti towns.
1748	1768	Ògóró, 28th Deji of Akure (son of Eyemoin)	He gained control of many vassal towns, who to this day speak the Akure dialect, including Ipogun, Ilara, Ikota, Iju, Itaogbolu, Ero, and Igbara-Oke.
1768	1818	(Aládémọ̀mí) Àràkálẹ̀, 29th Deji of Akure (a grandson of Eyemoin)	He reigned as the ruler (Adapogun) of the village of Ipogun before becoming monarch. During his time many towns migrated to Akure towards the Akure kingdom because of war. During his reign, relations with the Benin Kingdom deteriorated, leading to the Akure-Bini war that led to his execution and the capture of his son. The modern Akure royal families are both descended from Arakale.
1819	1823	Ògúnlégbojú, 30th Deji of Akure (son of Oba Ogoro)	First monarch of Akure after the town was invaded and conquered by the Benin kingdom. The Akure people who survived the war and were not taken fled to a hill known as Òkè-Ọ̀gẹ̀.
1823	1828	Aúsì, 31st Deji of Akure (most likey a son of Ogoro)	Reigned after the death of Ogunlegboju (probably his brother). Reigned on the hill known as Òkè-Ọ̀gẹ̀ where Akure people fled to because of the Benin war. He allegedly became disformed and was driven out of the palace
1828	1832	Ajalágà, 32nd Deji of Akure (likely son of Ausi)	The last monarch to rule in Òkè-Ọ̀gẹ̀. The reigns of Ogunlegboju, Ausi, and Ajalaga were dark times in Akure history, where there was famine and treachery.
1832	1834	Osuan (Ọ̀sụọ̀n), 33rd Deji of Akure (son of Ogunlegboju)	Upon Ajalaga's death, Osuan, a son of Ogunlegboju, was named king. However, the Oba of Benin had decided to place Adesoro, a son of Arakale, who was captured during the Akure-Benin War, as king. Because of this, Osuan was either killed so that Osupa could become king, or Osuan committed suicide. He is known as "Orhuon" in Benin records.
1834	1846	(Adésọ́rọ̀) Osupa I, 34th Deji of Akure (son of Arakale, also possibly a maternal grandson of Ausi)	He was kidnapped as a young prince in 1818 during the war in Benin and was enslaved for several years in Benin. After earning favor in Benin he was given permission to return to Akure, and later became the ruler of a community known as Isafirin as the Asafirin. He was nominated as king in 1832 instead of his brother Osuon, who was later killed or either committed suicide, allowing Adesoro to reign as "Osupa I." with the support of Benin. During his reign, Akure peoples who had lived in Benin returned to Akure, and Osupa gave them a place to settle, known as Ado-Akure.
1846	1849	Agbóyerẹ́, 35th Deji of Akure (son of Ajalaga)	He was said to be a notorious slave trader
1850	1851	Amọ́robíòjò (Amaro, Eye Aro), 36th Deji of Akure (daughter of Osupa)	Third female ruler of Akure, she died suddenly on the throne
1851	1852	Ọmọ́rẹ̀míọ̀ṣun, 37th Deji of Akure (son of Agboyere)	
1852	1882	(Aládégbùjì) Òjìjígògún, 38th Deji of Akure (son of Arakale)	He rose to throne when he was quite old, but still reigned for thirty years. He is the ancestor of the Ojijigogun royal house. Akure was at war with the Ibadan kingdom for most of his reign along with other Ekiti towns. Akure joined the forces of Ekiti-Parapo during the Kiriji War in 1877.
1882	1890	(Aládélùsì) Odundun I "Asọdedẹ̀rọ̀", 39th Deji of Akure (son of Osupa)	He was a ruthless king who allegedly beheaded his wife for sharing an inappropriate joke with him. Despite this, he was highly hailed as a bringer of peace (hence the name, Asodedero). He broke the tradition of paying tribute to Benin, a tradition started by his father Osupa. Akure legend also suggests Odundun used his powers to kill the Oba of Benin, Adolo
1890	8 January 1897	(Aládéjànà) Arọ́sóyè, 40th Deji of Akure (son of Ojijigogun)	First Deji to encounter Europeans
22 June 1897	1957	(Ọlọ́fịnladé) Adesida I Afúnbíowó, 41st Deji of Akure (son of Ojijigogun)	
1957	December 1973	Agúnsóyèbíòyìnbó Adémúwàgún Adéṣidà II, 42nd Deji of Akure (son of Adesida I)	
1975	5 June 1991	Òtùtùbíọ̀ṣun Adélẹgàn Adéṣidà III, 43rd Deji of Akure (son of Adesida I)	
31 December 1991	29 October October 1999	Atáyéṣe Adébọ́bajọ Adéṣidà IV, 44th Deji of Akure (son of Adesida I)	
1999	2005	Regent: Princess Adéyínká Adéṣidà (daughter of Adesida IV)	
2005	10 June 2010	Olúwadáre Adéṣínà Adépọ̀jù, "Osupa III", 45th Deji of Akure	He was dethroned for committing abominations on the throne. He claimed to be a descendant of Oba Osupa but was unable to explain his ancestry or relation to the past Dejis of the Osupa royal family.
13 August 2010	30 November 2013	Adebiyi Adegboye Adesida Afunbiowo II, 46th Deji of Akure (grandson of Adesida I)	
December 2013	June 2015	Regent: Princess Dr. Adétútù Adesida-Ojei (daughter of Afunbiowo II)	
July 2015	Present	Aladetoyinbo Ogunlade Aladelusi Ọ̀dúndún II, 47th Deji of Akure (paternal great-grandson of Odundun I)	
