= Aliyu Mohammed =

Aliyu Mohammed may refer to:

- Aliyu Mohammed Gusau, Nigerian general and statesman
- Aliyu Mohammed (official), Nigerian administrator
