= Ada and Abere =

Swords that represent symbols of authority in Yorubaland

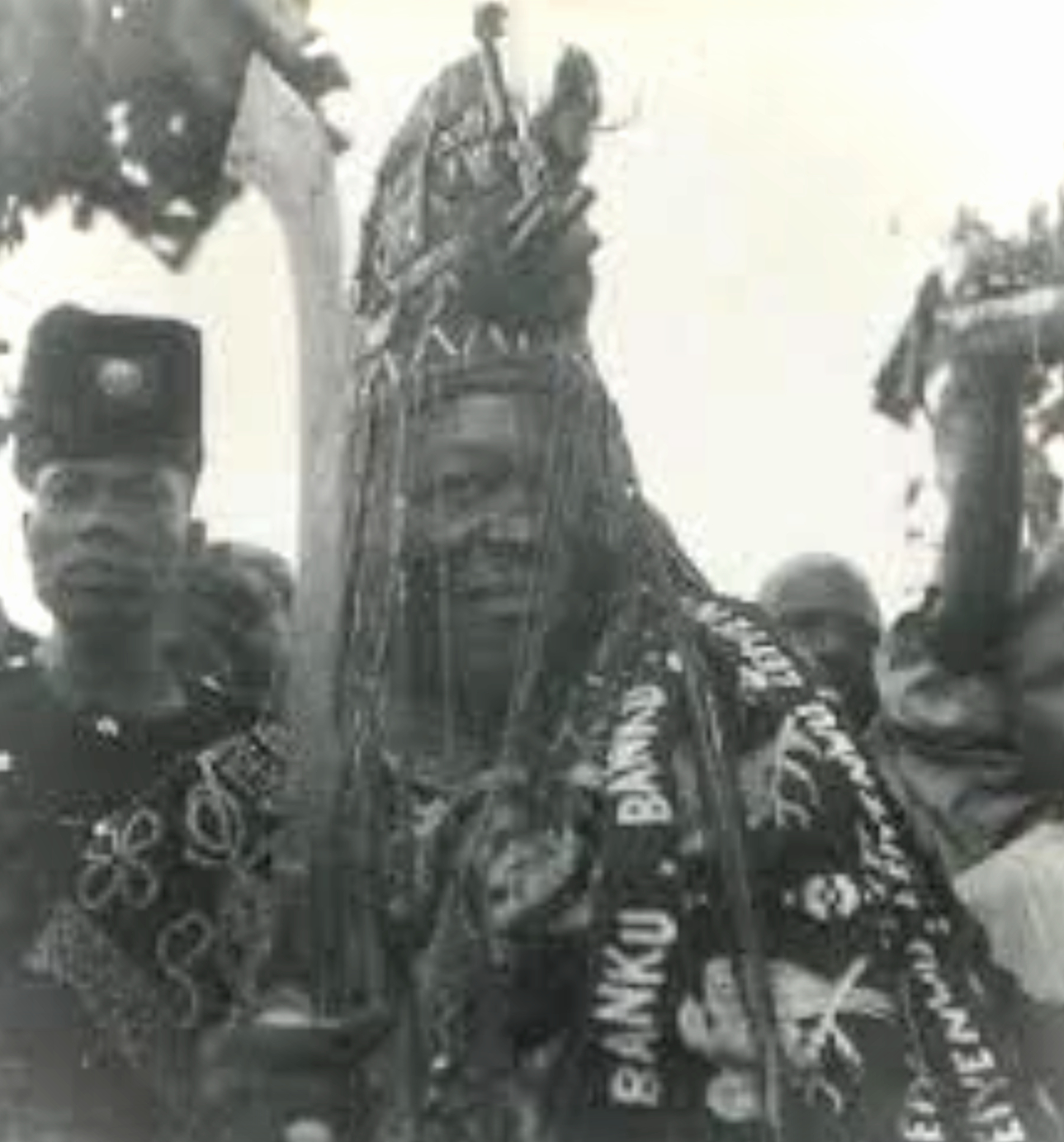
Ọba Atobatele I, Ọwọni Adesoji Aderemi in Ẹwu Ileke and Pakaja wielding the Ada during Olojo, the foremost Ogun festival in Ifẹ.

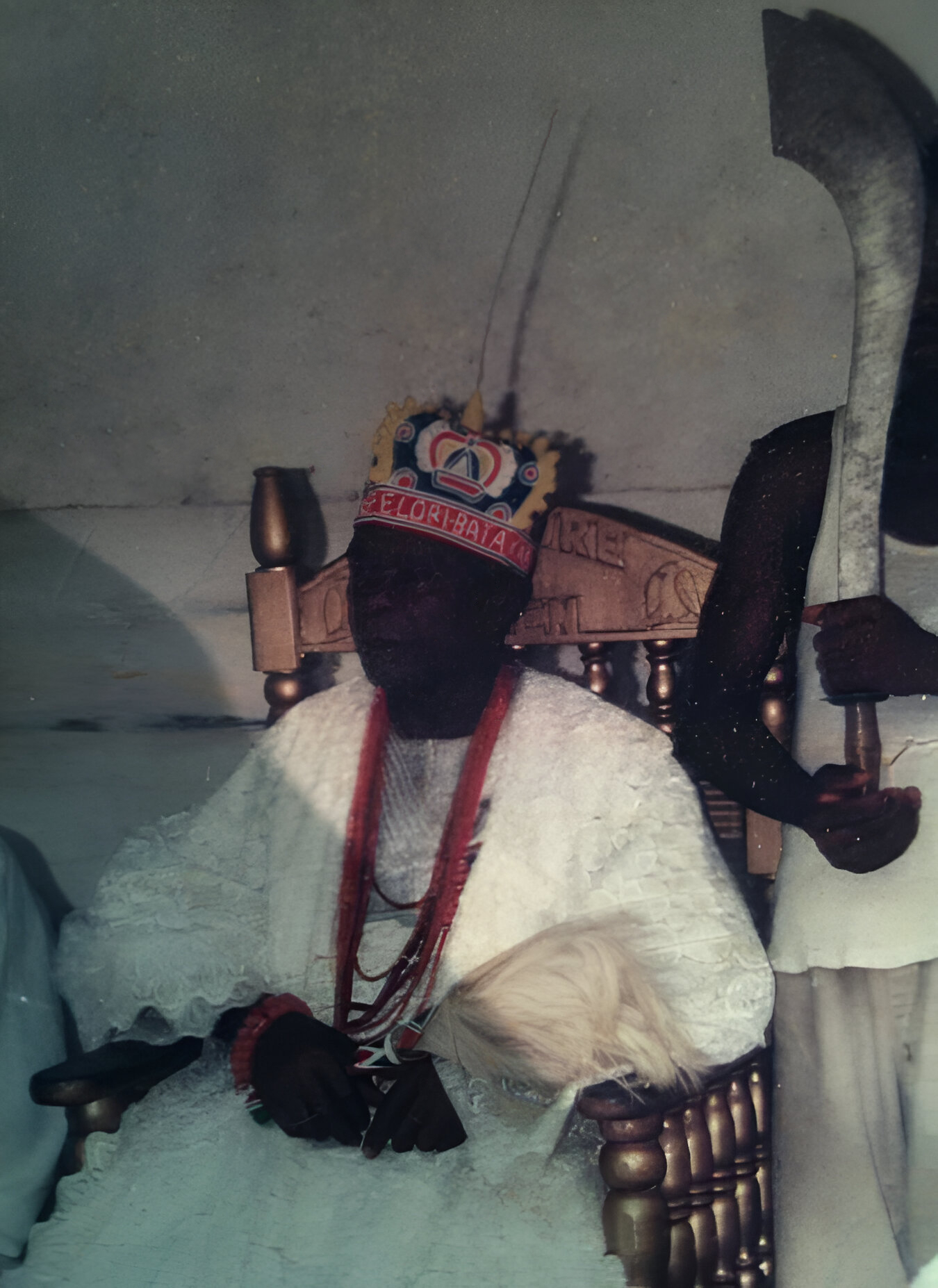
Ọba Ufẹluyi II, Olu-Awure of Usẹn (1921-1974) wearing Orikogbofo with his sword bearing page.

The Ada and Abere (Yoruba: Àdá àti Abẹ̀rẹ̀; Edo: Ada vbe Eben) are Yoruba state swords of authority in Yorubaland, Fon, Ga, and Benin Kingdom.

== Ada ==
=== Veneration of Ògún ===
As seen in the Orisha tradition, the Yoruba greatly revere their departed ancestors, and as such, have the belief that prayers offered to them are potent to procure temporal blessings. Ogun, one of the earliest kings of Ife, the totemic capital of the Yoruba nation, is venerated as the spirit of metal work and as a primordial Orisha of creativity, warfare, and technology. One of the most important objects in the cult of Ogun is the ceremonial Ada sword. This ceremonial sword is dedicated to him and is known by the name Ada-Ogun. Ogun devotees are afforded traditional respect in some courts which permit them to swear by a piece iron, in the same manner that Christians and Muslims swear to the Bible and the Quran.

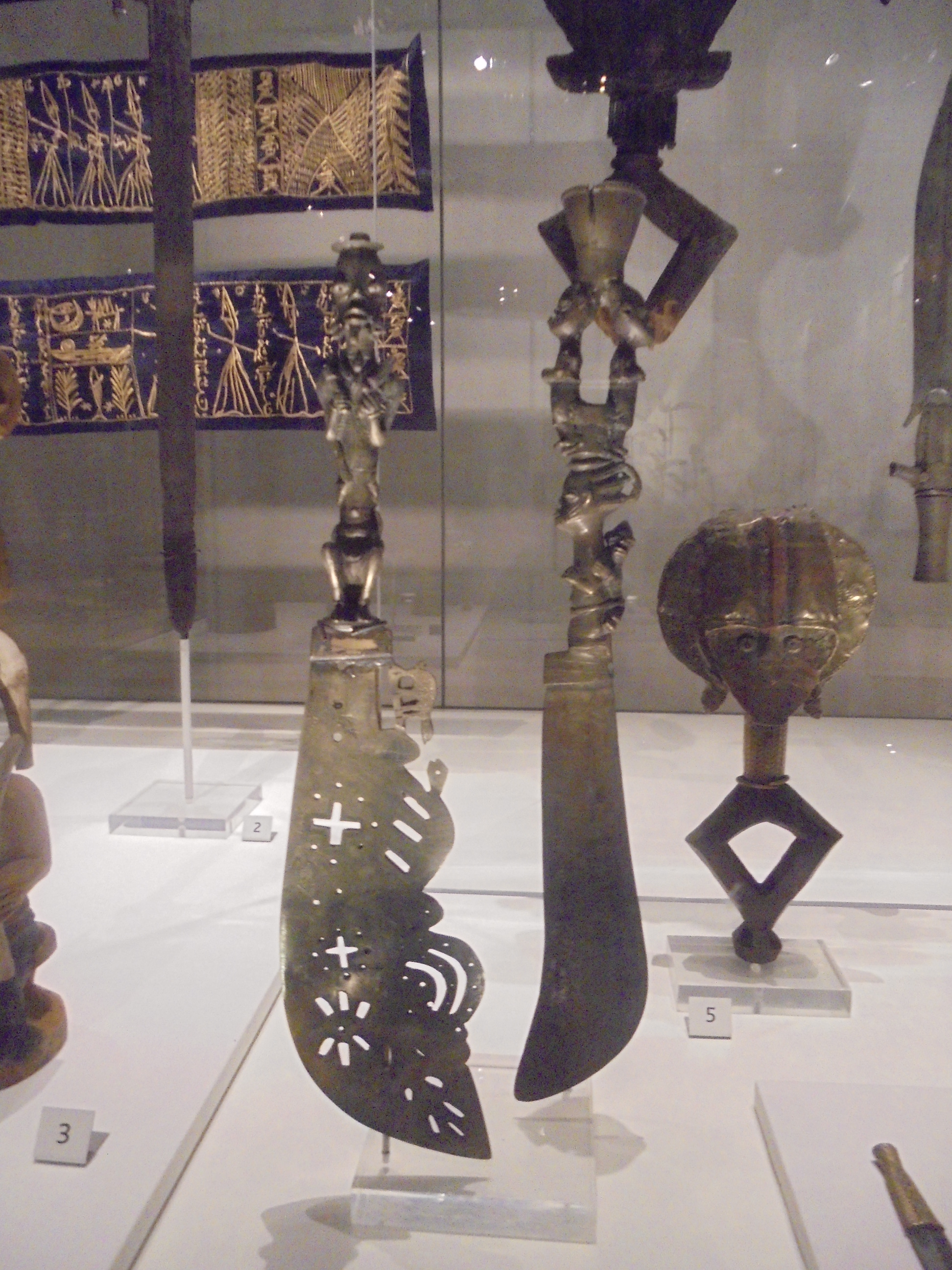
Ada Ogun

== Usage across Yorubaland & neighbouring filial states ==
=== Oyo Empire ===
Old flag of the Yoruba people with the traditional Yoruba Interlace (Ìbọ̀) pattern and the Abẹrẹ ceremonial sword.

One of the most renowned state swords is the Ida-Oranyan (Oranyan's Sword), named after the legendary founder of the Oyo Empire and the Benin Kingdom.

Whenever a new Alaafin was to be crowned, he was expected to go perform acts of reverence at the grave of Oduduwa and receive benediction. He then receives two items from Ife; The Ida Oranyan (Oranyan's consecrated sword of Justice), and the Igba Iwa (Calabash of existence) which are brought over. The sword was ceremoniously placed in his hands while the calabash was set before him to choose, but before then, the King-in-making had to swear an oath never to ever attack the territory of the kingdom of Ife. Without this being done, the king had no authority to order an execution and hence, no supreme judicial authority. In this practice the Sword of Justice symbolised the authority to make judgments over life and death.

A similar coronation took place whenever the Alaafin sought to give authority to representatives within his empire/realm, he would give a sword of justice to the would be 'kingling', who would have a direct connection to the throne. The swords owned by Chiefs and Baales were rarely displayed except during important festivals or special occasions such as the coronation of an Oba or the installation of a chief.

=== Kingdom of Dahomey ===
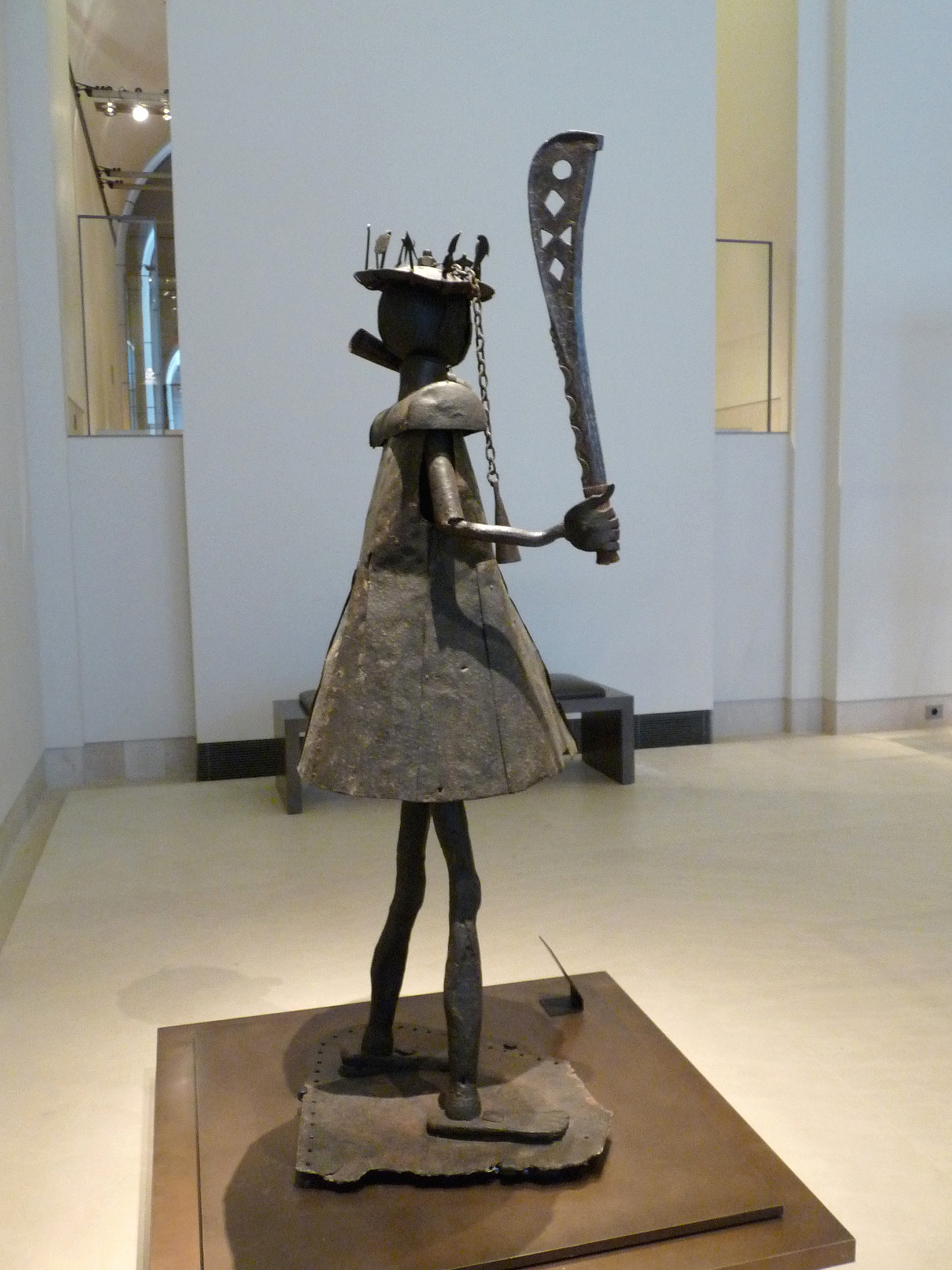
A Dahomean statue dedicated to Ogun/Gu holding a Gubasa (Gu sword)

In the royal palace and among the highest-ranking military officials of the neighbouring Fon kingdom of Dahomey such as the Migan (chief councillor), the Ada took the forms of the Hwi and Gubasa which were mandatory among the Fon in the coronation of every ruler. These swords were introduced from Ife and had to be reconsecrated in the Yoruba sacred city before its investment in a new ruler. The Dahomean King Glele adopted the Gubasa for his coat of arms, the blade was pierced with patterned holes whose shape signified Ogun.

=== Benin Kingdom ===
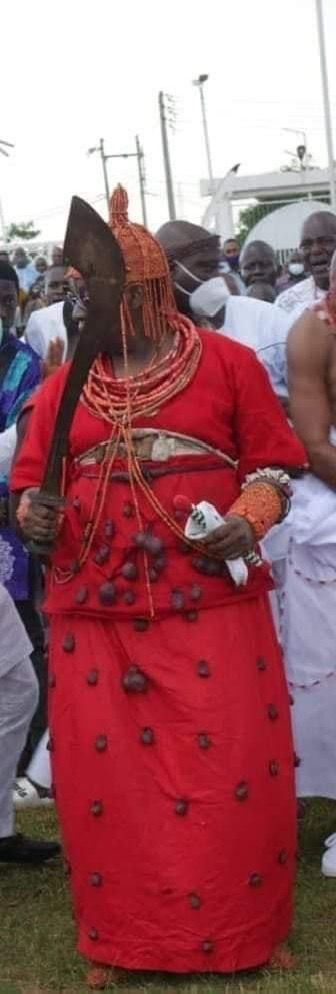
Oba of Benin with Ada

Just as the Alaafin of Oyo derived his sacred authority from the sword of justice delivered from Ife, so too did the Oba of Benin derive his consecration and divine authority to rule by way of brass coronation objects from the Ooni of Ife.

According to the Osa of Benin, a chief and high priest of Ife roots, his founding ancestor came from Ife with the earliest form of the Ada and Abere which was introduced into the Benin Kingdom. The Oba, the chief Osuan and the chief Osa all migrated from Ife. This fore-bearer came with three of these early scimitar forms; one for himself, one for the Oba, and the third for the chief Ine of Igun who became head of the blacksmithing (brass casting) guild in Benin.

In the Benin kingdom and several other Yoruba kingdoms which had intense royal and economic relations, the Ada was used in a public manner to project the authority of the Monarch. The Omo n'Oba of Benin, the Olowo Of Owo, and the Olu of Warri, are among the kings who had a sword-bearer carrying an Ada whenever they presented in public.

The Ada, Ida/Uda and Agada swords all contain a common Yoruba root verb, dá. The swords come in both ceremonial and regular forms, and their various shapes likely developed through their use in war.

== Abẹrẹ ==
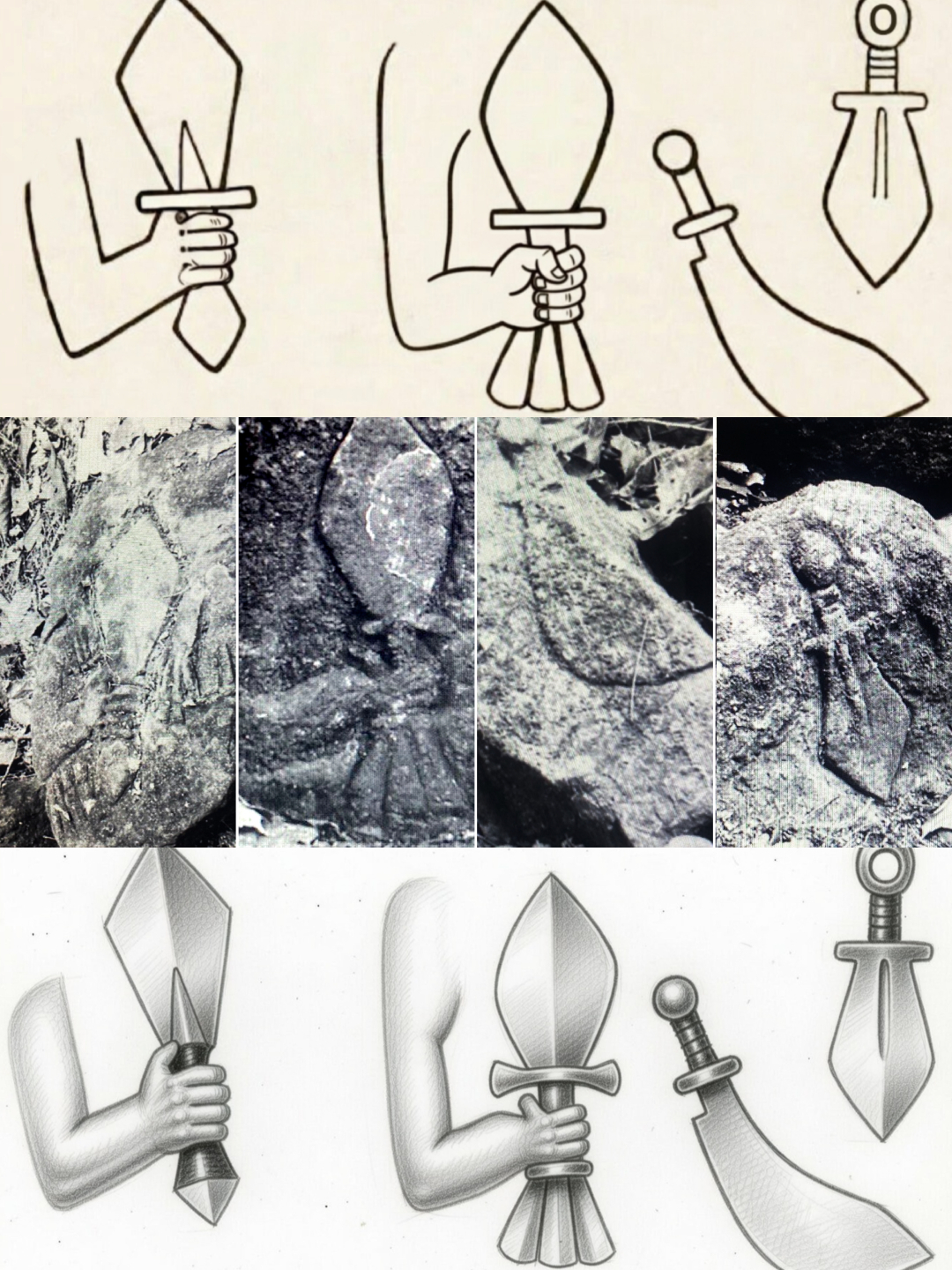
Middle row; Relief sculptures of Ada (single edged curved blade) and Abere (broad, leaf shaped blade) swords from the Agidi grove site, Ife Kingdom. Top; Drawing, Bottom; Sketch.

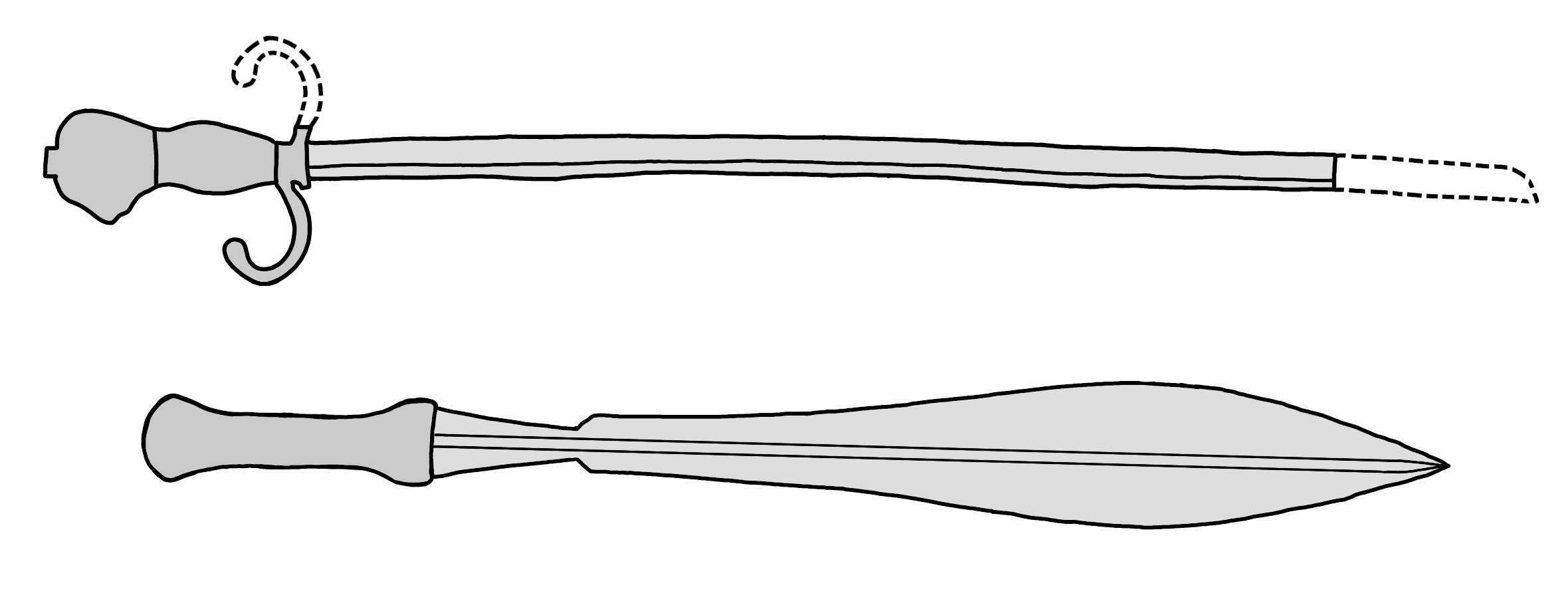
Two Yoruba typical sword variations according to Robert Sidney Smith. On top is a straight, single-edged, narrow bladed longsword type (Ida). And the bottom is the typical broad, double-edged leaf/fan shaped sword type (Abere), usually laden with geometric patterns.

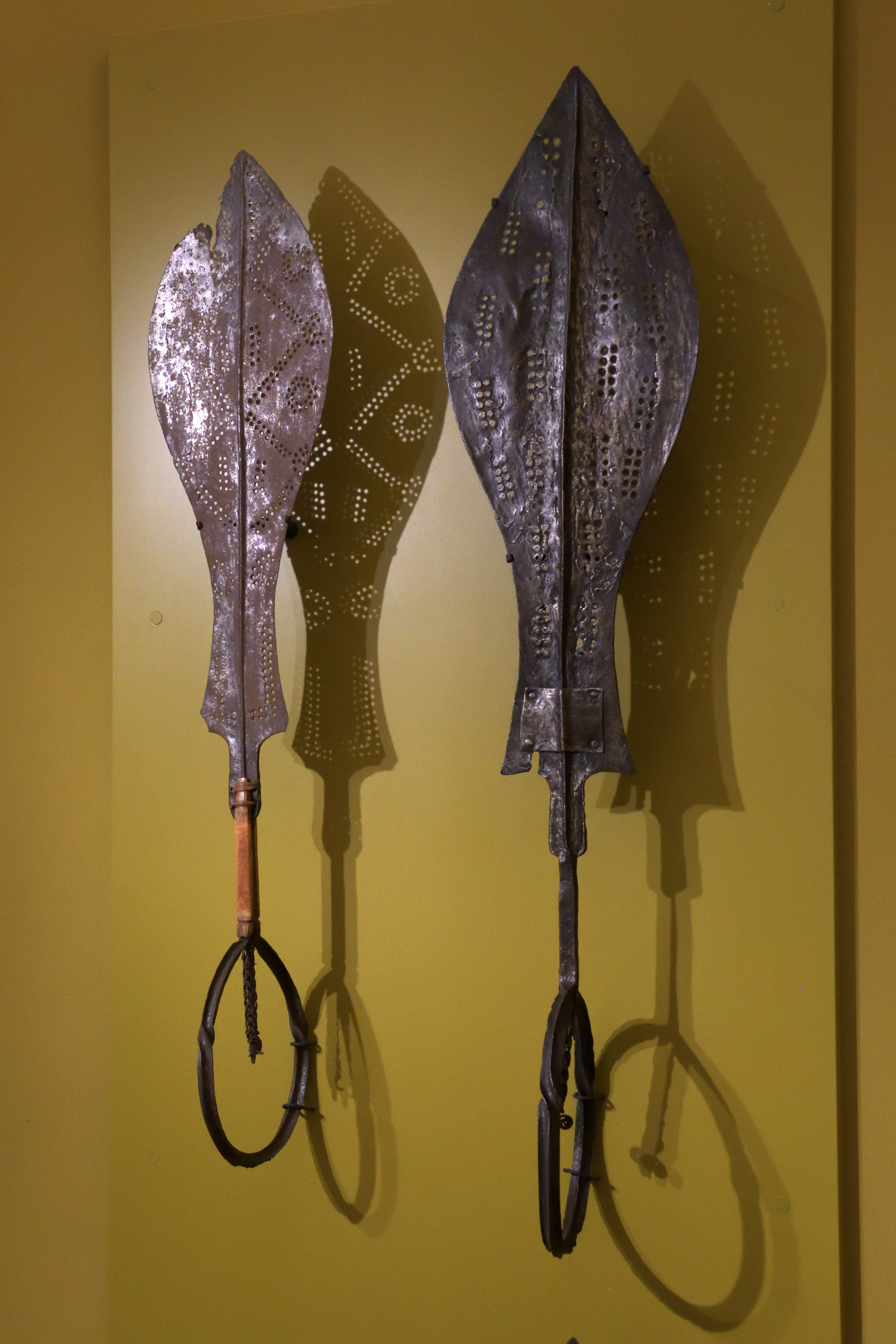
Abere

An Abere is a Yoruba word for a state sword said to be used by kings of different tribes.

=== Name variations and Linguistic divergence ===
Cyril Punch in his visit to the king of Benin in 1889, documented the use of a fan-like blade being twirled in the hands of chiefs during a ceremony. In his illustrations, he labelled and referred to the object as an “Ebere”. While his account contains the earliest known written name of the sword in the Benin kingdom, this type of object is more commonly known today as an “Eben” by the Edo people. On the other hand, among the Urhobo, one of the largest neighbours who derived certain aristocratic titles from the Benin royal court, people still know and remember the same sword by the name Abere(n).

A divergence in names for the same object is not all that unexpected as lexical borrowings over time adapt to the phonology (pronunciation) of the receiving language. Moreover, even within the Yoruba dialects, the Owo people for example refer to their ceremonial fan-blade as an “Ape”.

== Archaeology ==
Whether for ceremonial use, or for conventional use, it is evident that swords across these cultures have taken on varied identities, and many early oral traditions point to Ife as a source of their royal authority. Archaeological discoveries of ancient sword carvings of both types in rock as well as stone sculptures belonging to the period of early Ife monuments and 'fluorescence era' (1000 — 1400 CE) have been found in Ife and its immediate surroundings. One such example are the Ada and Abere carvings in relief from the Agidi grove, 9 miles south of the urban centre of Ife, within the Ife Kingdom, visited by archaeologist Kenneth Murray in May 1945, and Frank Willett in 1957. Agidi is an Ife personage said to have lived between Oduduwa and Obalufon.

Another such example is the Ada Eledisi (The sword of Eledisi) in Ife.

Yet another figure from the site of Igbo Orodi was sculpted holding a curved sword in its left hand and an Irukere (fly whisk) in its right with iron pegs on its body like the granite Oranmiyan staff in Ife.

== Contemporary issues ==
On the 22nd of November, 1957, an incident occurred in the Western Region of Nigeria. A pamphlet was produced by the Western Nigeria information service describing the new mace of office presented to the parliament at Ibadan. The pamphlet was criticized by the ethnic minorities of the region as having what was described as "traditional Yoruba patterns" and "four ceremonial swords in silver"; symbols which were Yoruba heraldic insignia symbolizing the power/authority of 'chiefs' in Yorubaland. These criticisms stemmed from a perception of marginalization by the region's ethnic minorities who feared Yoruba domination and perceived these symbols as too "Yoruba-centric" (at the time). Eventually, it was found out that the symbols in question were just as symbolic in Benin as they were among the Yoruba people, including the fact that the Olu of Warri just had one such sword carried before him at a hearing about the rights of minorities in contemporary Nigeria.

== See also ==
- Ife empire
- Oyo empire
- Fon people
- Benin Kingdom

Attribution:
