= Non-European royal and noble ranks =

Some titles of nobility outside Europe may be considered as equivalents of Duke.

Like other major Western noble titles, duke is sometimes used to render (translate) certain titles in non-western languages. "Duke" is used even though those titles are generally etymologically and often historically unrelated and thus hard to compare. However, they are considered roughly equivalent, especially in hierarchic aristocracies such as feudal Japan, useful as an indication of relative rank.

== China ==
In the most general of terms, Gong (Chinese: 公; Wade–Giles: Kung) was the hereditary title of nobility of the first rank, usually translated as Duke or Lord.

Under the Manchu (ruling ethnicity of the last imperial dynasty), there were ducal titles in both types of titled nobility.

=== Imperial family ===
Within the imperial family (extended, but limited; such systematic titulature is unknown in Europe) there were fourteen ranks, arranged in the following descending order:

1. Heshe Qinwang (Wade–Giles: Ho Shê Ch'in Wang), Prince of the Blood of the first rank, usually conferred on the sons of Emperors by an Empress;
2. Duoluozhun Wang (Wade–Giles: To Lo Chün Wang), Prince of the Blood of the second rank, originally Ho Shê To Lo Pei Lê or "Prince of the Gift", enjoying the style of His Imperial Highness, with a name or locality (hao) attached to the title and the right to a posthumous name (shi) after death, usually conferred on the sons of Emperors by Imperial Consorts;
3. Duoluo beile (Wade–Giles: To Lo Pei Lê), Prince of the Blood of the third rank and enjoying the style of His Highness;
4. Gushanbeizi (Wade–Giles: Ku Shan Pei Tzu), "Prince of the Banner", Prince of the Blood of the fourth rank, with the style of His Highness;
5. Fengenzhen Guogong (Wade–Giles: Fêng Ên Chên Kuo Kung), "defender duke": Prince of the Blood of the fifth rank with the style of His Highness;
6. Fengenfu Guogong (Wade–Giles: Fêng Ên Fu Kuo Kung), "bulwark duke": Prince of the Blood of sixth rank, with the style of His Highness; only those six highest ranks carried the right to the eight privileges or Ba Fen
  1. to wear the purple button,
  2. to wear a three-eyed peacock's feather,
  3. to wear embroidered dragon plaque on court robes,
  4. to have red painted spears at the gates of their residences,
  5. to attach tassels to the accouterments of their horses,
  6. to use purple bridle-reins,
  7. to have a servant carry a special teapot,
  8. to have a special carpet on which to seat themselves. Below were:
7. Buruba fenzhen Guogong (Wade–Giles: Pu Ju Pa Fên Chên Kuo Kung), "lesser defender duke not to encroach on the Eight Privileges", Prince of the Blood of the seventh rank with the style of His Excellency;
8. Buruba fenzhen fu Guogong (Wade–Giles: Pu Ju Pa Fên Fu Kuo Kung), "lesser bulwark duke not to encroach on the Eight Privileges" Prince of the Blood of the eighth rank with the style of His Excellency;
9. ZhenGuo jiangzhun (Wade–Giles: Chên Kuo Chiang Chün), Noble of the Imperial Lineage of the ninth rank, divided into three grades (or Têng);
10. FuGuo jiangzhun (Wade–Giles: Fu Kuo Chiang Chün), Noble of the Imperial Lineage of the tenth rank, divided into three grades;
11. FengGuo jiangzhun (Wade–Giles: Fêng Kuo Chiang Chün) "supporter-general of the state", Noble of the Imperial Lineage of the eleventh rank, divided into three grades;
12. Fengen jiangzhun (Wade–Giles: Fêng Ên Chiang Chün), "general by grace", noble of the Imperial Lineage of the twelfth rank;
13. Zongshi (Wade–Giles: Tsung Shih), Imperial clansman, the usual rank for male descendants, in the male line, beyond the twelfth generation, entitled to wear an Imperial Yellow Girdle denoting their descent from Emperor Hsien Tsu;
14. Jiulo (Wade–Giles: Chio Lo), collateral relatives of the Imperial clan, entitled to wear a distinctive Red Girdle denoting their descent from the collateral relatives of Emperor Hsien Tsu.

=== Non-imperial family ===
1. Gong, divided into three classes or Deng, often translated as Duke, or as Prince (but not of the blood), is the second of ten hereditary titles of Nobility (Jueyin) (Wade–Giles: Chüeh Yin) or Shijue (Wade–Giles: Shih Chüeh) conferred on subjects and collateral members of the Imperial clan, only under Yansheng gong (Wade–Giles: Yen Shêng Kung) ('sacred Prince', reserved for Confucius' posterity), but above all other ranks,
2. Hou (also three classes, translated as Marquis or Marquess) (these first three ranks were classed as Chaopin (Wade–Giles: Ch'ao P'in) ("Eminent Ranks", carrying honorific epithets),
3. Bo (Wade–Giles: Po) (three classes, translated as Earl or Count),
4. Zi (Wade–Giles: Tzu) (three classes, translated as Viscount),
5. Nan (three classes, translated as Baron),
6. Qingche duyu (Wade–Giles: Ch'ing Ch'e Tu Yü),
7. Qiduyu (Wade–Giles: Ch'i Tu Yü),
8. Yunqiyu (Wade–Giles: Yün Ch'i Yü),
9. Enqiyu (Wade–Giles: Ên Ch'i Yü)

All, except the ninth grade, were heritable for a specific number of generations, ranging from twenty-six generations for a first class Kung to one generation for a Yün Ch'i Yü. In certain instances, some titles were held by Right of Perpetual Inheritance Shixi wangti (Wade–Giles: Shih Hsi Wang T'i).

== Ethiopia ==
Historian Harold G. Marcus equates the Ethiopian title of Ras (Ge'ez: ራስ, romanized: ras, lit. 'head') to a Duke. The combined title of Leul (Prince) Ras was given to the heads of the cadet branches of the Imperial dynasty, such as the Princes of Gojjam, Tigray, and Selale.

== Japan ==
The highest-ranking of the fives titles of the kazoku (flowery lineage (華族)), the hereditary peerage of Japan between 1869 and 1947, kōshaku, is rendered in Western languages either as prince or as duke.

== Korea ==
In Goryeo Dynasty, there were two ranks similar to that of duke. The upper was Gukgong (Korean: 국공; Hanja: 國公; lit. 'duke of the nation'). Gukgong was the first rank of Goryeo peerage system, and 3,000 families gave their agricultural production and workforce for Gukgong. The lower was Gungong (Korean: 군공; Hanja: 郡公; lit. 'duke of county'), which took 2,000 families' production and workforce. In bureaucratic order, Gukgong was in upper second rank, and Gungong was in lower second rank.

In Joseon Dynasty, there was no title that is equivalent to Duke.

== Nigeria ==
In the Kingdom of Benin, an Enogie is a viceroyal chieftain of royal rank that reigns as the representative of the oba of Benin. Such a titleholder is superior to an Odionwere (a viceroyal chief who is not of the blood royal), and is therefore often a cadet of the Benin royal family. Enogies are referred to as dukes in English.

In Yorubaland, a viceroyal chief is known as a Baale. Although not of royal rank and thus barred from wearing a crown, a baale is nevertheless given considerable autonomy in the kingdom that he serves: he can appoint sub-chiefs, and often performs rites in traditional ceremonies that would otherwise be the oba's prerogative.

In the Sokoto Caliphate, a viceroyal chief is known as a Hakimi. He is often, but not necessarily, a relative of the reigning sultan or emir, and is commonly referred to as a district head in English.

== Vietnam ==
Male members of the Imperial clan received, in addition to a birthright title by degree of parentage, one of nine senior titles of nobility:

- Vuong (King)
- Quoc-Cong (Grand Duke)
- Quan-Cong (Duke)
- Cong (Prince)
- Hau (Marquis)
- Ba (Count)
- Tu (Viscount)
- Nam (Baron)
- Vinh phong (noble)
