= Olu Falae =

Nigerian politician (born 1938)

Chief Olu Falae CFR

Minister of Finance
- In office 8 January 1990 – 29 August 1990
- President: Ibrahim Babangida
- Preceded by: Chu Okongwu
- Succeeded by: Abubakar Alhaji

Secretary to the Government of the Federation
- In office 31 January 1986 – 1 January 1990
- President: Ibrahim Babangida
- Preceded by: G.A. Longe
- Succeeded by: Aliyu Mohammed

Personal details
- Born: Samuel Oluyemisi Falae; 21 September 1938 (age 88) Akure, Southern Region, British Nigeria (now Akure, Ondo State, Nigeria)
- Party: Social Democratic Party (Nigeria)
- Relatives: Odundun II (second cousin & third cousin); Oba Osupa I (great-great grandfather)
- Education: University of Ibadan; Yale College

Chief Samuel Oluyemisi Falae// CFR (born 21 September 1938), is a Nigerian banker, administrator and politician who was secretary to the military government of Ibrahim Babangida from January 1986 to December 1990, and briefly the Finance Minister in 1990. He ran for president in Nigeria's Third and Fourth Republics.

== Early life and education ==
Falae was born to the family of Chief Joshua Alekete Falae and Abigail Aina Falae on September 21, 1938, in Ilu-Abo, Akure. Joshua Falae was originally from Akure but due to opportunities in cocoa farming, Falae's family and a few other Akure natives moved to a nearby location called Ago-Abo – also known as Ilu Abo – where they settled as pioneers. Falae's father was later made the chief of Ago-Abo village. Falae's mother was born and raised in the village of Igbara-Oke and died during childbirth in 1946 when Falae was only 8. He was then raised by his father and his paternal grandmother, Chief Osanyintuke Falae (née Adedipe), who was a maternal granddaughter of Deji Osupa of Akure and a daughter of the Elemo of Akure, Chief Adedipe Oporua Atoosin (himself a great-grandson of Deji Arakale of Akure, Osupa's father). Falae attended an Anglican primary school in Akure where he met his future wife, Rachael Olatubosun Fashoranti, younger sister of Afenifere leader Reuben Fashoranti. After primary education, he sat for the entrance exam into Igbobi College and was accepted in 1953. upon graduation from Igbobi, he went on to complete his Higher School Certificate at Government College, Ibadan in 1958 and later became a tutor at Oyemekun Grammar School, Akure. He attended the University of Ibadan for his undergraduate studies earning a degree in economics, thereafter, he obtained a graduate degree at Yale University in the United States. At the University of Ibadan, he represented his hall of residence in the Students Representative Council and was editorial board member of the student run campus magazine.

== Civil service and government career ==
After completing his bachelor's degree in economics, Falae joined the civil service as the assistant secretary of the National Manpower Board. He later became a principal assistant secretary of the board. In 1971, he was transferred to the Central Planning office and by 1975, he was a director at the planning office. During his stint at the planning office, the department was actively involved producing the third national development plan for the country and conducting a revision exercise after a change in government. In 1977, Falae was appointed permanent secretary (Economic dept.), Cabinet office.

In 1981, he became the managing director of Nigerian Merchant Bank (NMB), formerly United Dominion Trust. In Falae's tenure at the bank, the firm increased its authorized and lending capital.

Falae returned to public service in 1986 when he was appointed Secretary to the Government. By then, he believed Nigeria needed economic re-structuring. In 1985, prior to his appointment, the military sought the public opinion of an IMF economic structuring proposal as a condition for external credit from the fund. The popular opinion was to reject the proposal. The administration then came up with Structural Adjustment Programme (SAP). SAP was a proposal to diversify export from a crude oil dependent regime, ensure fiscal and balance of payments equilibrium and non-inflationary growth. The mechanisms to be implemented in order to achieve these objectives were the devaluation of the naira, reduction of petroleum products subsidies and trade liberalization. During his time in office, Falae became a vocal defender of SAP even when it was becoming unpopular with the masses, earning him the moniker "Mr. SAP" amongst ordinary Nigerians.

He left the post of Secretary to the Government and served as the Federal Minister of Finance in 1990 in the military regime of Ibrahim Babangida. He was relieved from office in August 1990. Thereafter, he joined the democratic transition programme.

== Political career ==
Falae's foray into politics started during the Third Republic. Babangida had banned 'old breed' politicians, who were mostly people who had held elective office in the past such as Bola Ige and Lateef Jakande. Falae soon became the candidate of choice for followers of Awolowo and some progressives within the Social Democratic Party. He contested the post but lost to Shehu Musa Yar'Adua before the elections were cancelled. He later threw his support and organization towards actualizing the presidential ambition of MKO Abiola.

In the mid-1990s, following the cancellation of the June 12, 1993 election and the coming to power of a new military government, Falae became a prominent member of the National Democratic Coalition during the quest for the restoration of democracy in Nigeria. Falae was jailed by the military government of Sani Abacha, but was released in June 1998 after Abacha's death. He unsuccessfully contested the 1999 Nigerian presidential elections on the joint platform of the Alliance for Democracy and the All People's Party against Olusegun Obasanjo, the presidential candidate for the People's Democratic Party. He "swept" the southwestern votes but was unable to attract significant support elsewhere. Since then, Falae has lived in semi-retirement as a large scale farmer in Ago Abo, Akure. He was awarded the national honour of Commander of the Federal Republic in 2008. As of 2008, Falae is the pro tem Chairman of the Democratic Peoples Alliance, a progressive party allied with the All Progressives Grand Alliance.

On 21 September 2015, Falae was kidnapped on his farm on his 77th birthday, with the kidnappers demanding 100 million Naira ($500,000) as a ransom. He was ultimately released on 24 September 2015, after the payment of the ransom and returned to his home in Akure. The kidnappers were later arrested and in 2017, were sentenced to life imprisonment.

== Chieftaincy titles ==
A direct descendant of Oba Osupa I of Akure (who was his great-great-grandfather), Chief Falae currently holds the chieftaincy titles of the Baale Oluabo of Ilu Abo and the Gbobaniyi of Akure.
