= Afunbiowo II =

Nigerian monarch (1950–2013)

46th Deji of Akure
- Reign: 13 August 2010 – 30 November 2013
- Coronation: 14 August 2010
- Predecessor: Osupa III
- Successor: Odundun II
- Born: Adebiyi Adegboye Adesida; 5 September 1950; Akure, Ondo State
- Died: 30 November 2013 (aged 63); Akure
- Burial: Akure
- Issue: Omoba Adetutu Adesida-Ojei
- House: Ojijigogun/Adesida
- Dynasty: Asodeboyede
- Father: Prince Josiah Stanley Adegboye Adesida
- Religion: Yoruba religion

Adebiyi Adegboye Adesida Afunbiowo II (5 September 1950 – 30 November 2013) was a Nigerian monarch who was chosen as the traditional ruler, or Deji, of the Akure Kingdom, based in the city of Akure in Ondo State, Nigeria on 13 August 2010. State governor Olusegun Mimiko presented him with the staff of office.

== History ==
Oba Afunbiowo II was born on 5 September 1950 as the son of Omoba Josiah Stanley Adegboye Adesida, a prince of Akure, and grandson of Oba Adesida I of Akure. His older brother was Omoba Adewole Adesida, of the Ojijigogun Ruling House.

His father died tragically in 1955, which affected the Adesida House, as he was the supposed successor of his father who had ruled for 60 years, and was one of the first Akure natives to graduate from University. He was then raised in the palace by his mother and grandmother.

He graduated from the University of Ibadan with a bachelor's degree in Agricultural Economics and a master's degree in Agricultural Business and Management before working as an Agricultural Credit Officer with the Ondo State Agricultural Credit Corporation. For some time he worked at the Obasanjo Farms at Otta. He was subsequently an aide to the president, Chief Olusegun Obasanjo, from 1999 to 2007. Afunbiowo II was selected to succeed the previous Oba, Oluwadamilare Adesina, (Osupa III) who had been dethroned on 10 June 2010 for sacrilegious misdeeds.

In the election for Deji, Adesida was selected by eight out of the 15 kingmakers, with Omoba Ademola Adegoroye taking the other seven votes. The selection process was somewhat controversial, with some of the kingmakers later claiming that Governor Mimiko had forced the decision by declaring one vote invalid due to "senility".

Afunbiowo II chose his regnal name in honor of his grandfather, Oba Adesida I, whose name was Olofinlade Afunbiowo Ojijigogun. Afunbiowo II was the latest member of the Adesida branch of the House of Ojijigogun to ascend the throne of Akure, founded by his great-grandfather, Oba Ojijigogun (r.1852-1882). Immediately following his enthronement, he embarked on an ambitious building program that saw the Deji's palaces - one of which is a national monument - refurbished. He also made efforts to reconcile with the baales (or viceroyal chieftains) that had been feuding with the Akure kingship since the reigns of his predecessors.

On 30 November 2013, Adesida died suddenly in Akure. His daughter, the Omoba Adetutu, was subsequently invested as princess regent in his stead.
