= African Theological Archministry =

U.S. nonprofit organization

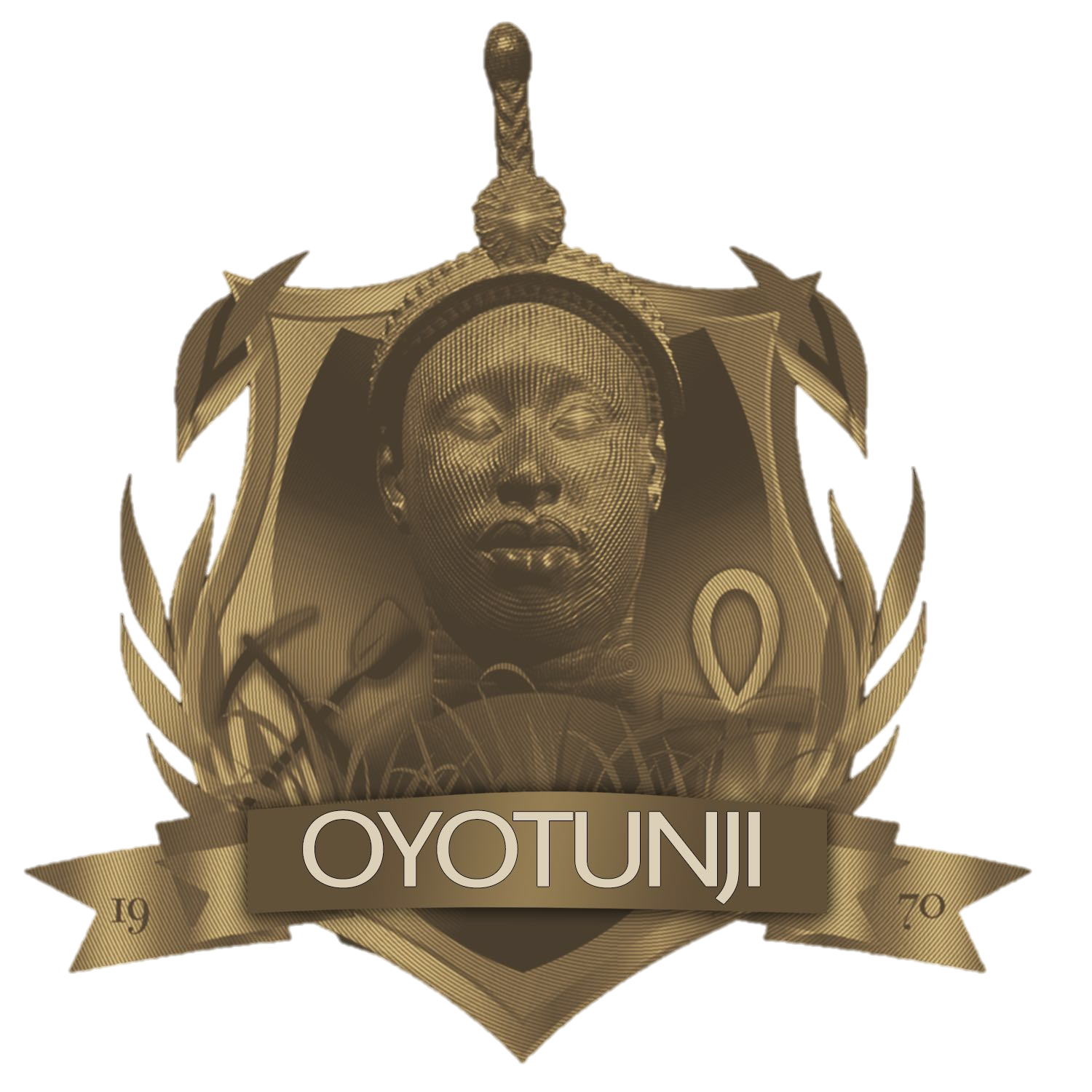
- Abbreviation: A.T.A.
- Established: 1 March 1970; 56 years ago
- Type: 501(c)(3) NPO
- Legal status: Active
- Headquarters: Oyotunji, South Carolina, U.S.
- Official language: English
- Chief Executive Officer: Oba Adejuyigbe Adefunmi II
- Executive Director: Olofundeyi Olaitan
- Affiliations: Oyotunji African Village (O.A.V.)
- Revenue: less than $50,000
- Website: www.oyotunji.org

The African Theological Archministry (ATA) is a charitable and spiritual 501(c)(3) nonprofit organization chartered in the state of South Carolina in 1980. It spawned as a cultural, historical and spiritual movement in New York in the 1970s from the "Sango Temple", a branch of the ancient spiritual traditions of the ancient Isese of the Yoruba and Vodun of the Fon that was founded by Oba Efuntola Oseijeman Adefunmi I, born Walter Eugene King in Detroit, Michigan.

In 1970, King was crowned "Oba" in West Africa and took the regal name "Oba Efuntola Adelabu Adefunmi I". He then moved the congregation of practitioners that had grown around him to South Carolina, where they subsequently founded the Oyotunji community. The group has grown over the years, having nineteen affiliated centers in the United States in 1988.

== See also ==
- Oyotunji African Kingdom
