= Adesida I =

Nigerian monarch

Adesida the Great

40th Deji of Akure
- Reign: June 22, 1897 – 1957
- Coronation: June 22, 1897
- Predecessor: Arosoye I
- Successor: Adesida II
- Born: 1860; Akure
- Died: 1957 (aged 97); Akure
- Burial: Akure
- Spouses: Olori Alojo Ademua Adesida (née Olutoye); Olori Olamiseji Adesida; Olori "Eyelua" Adumosha Adesida; Olori Alice Adelegan Adesida; Olori Lanre Adebobajo Adesida
- Issue Detail: Princess Adeyemiju Adesida; Princess Tinuade Adesida Famotua; Prince Josiah Stanley Adegboye Adesida; Prince Adesida Adekitan Daniel II; Prince Aladekomo Adesida; Princess Adediwura Aderemi Akintide; Prince Akowe Adesida; Prince Iranade Adesida; Prince Aladesuyi Adesida; Princess Ademikaye Omodara (Adesida); Prince Adeusi Adesida; Prince Adedeji Adesida; Prince Moradeyo Adesida; Prince Adeteye Adesida; Prince Adelanke Adesida; Adesida II; Adesida IV
- House: Ojijigogun
- Dynasty: Asodeboyede
- Father: Oba Ojijigogun
- Mother: Adojolomo Lagokun
- Religion: Yoruba religion

Adesida I (Olofinlade Afunbiowo Ojijigogun Asodeboyede; c. 1860 – 1957) was a Nigerian monarch. He ruled the Akure Kingdom from June 22, 1897 until 1957.

His lineal descendants are today known as the House of Adesida, a part of the House of Ojijigogun. The Ojijigoguns serve as one of Akure's two legally recognized royal families.

== Early life ==
Oba Adesida I was born as Prince Olofinlade Afunbiowo of the Asodeboyede dynasty in c. 1858; he was the youngest son of Oba Ojijigogun (c. 1790-1882), the Deji of Akure from 1852 to 1882 and one of his wives, Olori Adojolomo Lagokun (c.1810-1890), daughter of the Sashere of Idanre. He had many older half brothers including Aladejimokun, Olokunjuwon, Aladejana (later Arosoye I) and Prince Ifaturoti Adegoroye, and many other siblings. Through his father, he claimed hereditary kinship with all of the preceding rulers of both Akure. His father was the son of Oba Arakale, who was executed by the Benin Empire in 1818, during the Akure-Benin War.

Through his mother, he was a grandson of the Sashere of Idanre, Chief Lagokun.

His father, Ojijigogun (Ojijigogun), born Aladegbuji, ruled Akure from 1852 until his death in 1882.

== Marriage and children ==
As a monarch, Oba Adesida had many wives and at least 17 children. One of his wives was Olori Olojo Adesida (née Ademua), the daughter of the King Alani of Idoani. Three of his children became future Dejis of Akure, and his oldest son was one of the first western educated Akure natives. Prominent grandchildren of his include Oba Afunbiowo II, the musician King Sunny Ade, and the medical practitioner and historian Dr. Olawunmi Akintide.

== Reign ==
In 1882, the Deji of Akure - his father Oba Ojijigogun - died. This created a vacancy in the office, and several eligible princes sought the throne, including Olofinlade's two siblings, Arosoye and Ifaturoti, and his first cousin, Odundun I. Oba Odundun was ultimately selected, and was crowned shortly afterwards. Adesida sought the throne again in 1890 when Odundun died but lost once again, this time to his older brother. He finally won in 1897 and ruled thereafter for 60 years, the longest reign in Akure history.

Oba Adesida I's rule was characterized by increased British occupation and the amalgamation of Nigeria in 1914. His cooperation with British authorities earned him the respect of the British rulers, and Queen Elizabeth II greeted him on her visit to Nigeria in 1956.

Unlike many Yoruba rulers who also worshipped the traditional orisha of the Yoruba religion, Oba Adesida I welcomed Christian missionaries to Akure. In addition, his support for the British occupation can be seen from the fact that he sided with the colonial government when they introduced the first income tax, even when Akure people rioted and attacked him in his palace. He also supported the creation of the first church and primary school in Akure, leading his rule to be known as a "Golden Age of Akure" in terms of cultural transformation and education.

== Death and legacy ==
Oba Adesida I died in 1957 at the claimed age of 125, though likely at 101. His exact birth date is unknown as there were no written records in the 1830s or 1840s. An Akure historian, Dr. Akintide, explains that the omo-ori-ite rule in place in Akure before it was removed by the Akure military government in 1999, stated that a prince could only become king if he was born during the reign of his father. Because Oba Adesida's father Oba Ojijigogun began his reign in 1852, that would suggest that Oba Adesida was born after 1852. Considering that he was also the younger brother of Oba Arosoye I and Prince Ifaturoti (both of whom would also have had to be born after 1852), Adesida would have to be born at least after 1856, putting his death age at the more reasonable age of 101.

He was succeeded by his son under the regnal name Adesida II, and his progeny ruled Akure for another 42 years until the military government of Ondo State created the House of Osupa and subsequently placed a supposed descendant of Oba Osupa I on the throne thereafter. Two of his other sons also succeeded him as Oba Adesida III and Oba Adesida IV. His grandson was Oba Afunbiowo II.

A prominent member of the Adesida royal family is King Sunny Ade, a world famous juju singer, who is Oba Adesida I's descendant through Princess Maria Adegeye Adeniyi.

Adesida I's legacy has been documented extensively by the aforesaid Dr. Olawunmi Akintide, his grandson and a one-time secretary of the Omoremilekun Asodeboyede ruling house, who wrote his biography The Lion King and the Cubs.

== See also ==
- Akure Kingdom
