= Adefunmi =

American animist (1928–2005)

Oba Adefunmi
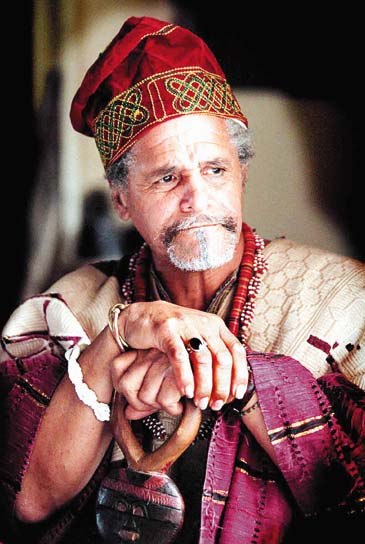

Oba of Oyotunji
- Reign: 1970–2005
- Predecessor: Position Established
- Successor: Adejuyigbe Adefunmi II
- Born: Walter Eugene King; October 5, 1928; Detroit, Michigan, U.S.
- Died: February 11, 2005 (aged 76)
- Religion: Yoruba religion

Efuntola Oseijeman Adelabu Adefunmi (born Walter Eugene King, October 5, 1928 – February 11, 2005) was the first documented African-American initiated into the priesthood of the Yoruba religion, who would then go on to become the first African-American to be crowned Oba (King) of the Yoruba of North America in Abẹ́òkúta, Nigeria.

== Biography ==
King was born in Detroit, Michigan. King left the Baptist faith that he had been baptized into at the age of 12. He grew up with an interest in African culture and began African studies at the age of 16. At the age of 20, King traveled to Haiti to study the Haitian culture and Haitian Vodou. In 1959, just before the Cuban revolution, he traveled to the Matanzas region of Cuba and became the first documented African-American to be initiated into the Yoruba priesthood of sango, Ọbatala where he was named "Efuntola Oseijeman Adefunmi". Efuntola means "the whiteness (of Obatala) is as good as wealth (or honor)." Adefunmi means "the crown has given me this (child)."

Upon his return to the United States, he founded the Order of the Damballah Hwedo in Harlem New York, then the Shango Temple, and later incorporated the African Theological Archministry. That organization would come to be called the Yoruba Temple. In 1970, along with several other devotees, Oba Adefunmi created the Oyotunji village in Beaufort County, South Carolina.

Oba Adefunmi's black nationalist stance drew large criticism from within the ranks of the Cuban Santería priests because of his strident opposition to certain aspects of their religion, aspects which - he felt - did not keep with the traditional form of the Yoruba religion. This eventually led to his break from the Cuban form of Ifa (Santeria-Lukumi). To replace his former teachers, Adefunmi journeyed to Yorubaland in Africa, where he was welcomed and initiated as a babalawo in Abẹ́òkúta.

Adefunmi's brother is Henri “Umbaji” King, who was one of the directors of the North American Zone of FESTAC 77, the Second World Black and African Festival of Arts and Culture, which took place in Lagos, Nigeria.

== Bibliography ==
- Ancestors (Tribal origins) of the African-Americans, Yoruba Temple, (1962)
- Tribal origins of the African-Americans, Yoruba Temple, (1962)
- Olorisha: A guidebook into Yoruba religion, Orisha Academy (1982)
- The African state: An outline of the philosophy and organization of the ancient Yoruba kingdom of West Africa, pre-European period, Yoruba Temple, (1962)
- Lewis, James R. The Encyclopedia of Cults, Sects, and New Religions. Amherst, New York: Prometheus Books, 1998. ISBN 1-57392-222-6.

== Additional books and articles ==
- Oyotunji village: The Yoruba movement in America, Carl M Hunt
- The Joseph E. Holloway Papers Cornell University Library
- African gods in South Carolina Essence Magazine
- An African kingdom in America American Visions Magazine
