= Oyotunji =

Intentional African-American community in South Carolina

Coordinates: 32°36′34.51″N 80°48′10.24″W

Oyotunji African Village
- Religious intentional community
- Flag
- Etymology: "Oyo returns", or "Oyo rises again" in reference to the Oyo Empire
- Interactive map of Oyotunji African Village
- Established: 1970
- Founder: Efuntola Oseijeman Adelabu Adefunmi I

Area
  - Total: 27 acres (11 ha)
- Time zone: UTC-5 (Eastern (EST))
  - Summer (DST): UTC-4 (EDT)
- ZIP code: 29941
- Area code(s): 843, 854
- Website: https://oyotunjikingdom.org

Oyotunji African Village, also known as Oyotunji African Kingdom, is a village patterned after the traditional customs and traditions of the Yoruba people of Nigeria, Benin and Dahomey, located near Sheldon, Beaufort County, South Carolina that was founded by Oba Efuntola Oseijeman Adelabu Adefunmi I in 1970.

Oyotunji is named after the Oyo empire, and its name literally means Oyo returns or Oyo rises again. The village covers 27 acres (11 ha) and has seven Yoruba temples which were relocated from Harlem, New York to its present location in 1970. During the 1970s, the era of greatest population growth at the village, the number of inhabitants grew from 5 to between 200 and 250. The population is rumored to fluctuate between five and nine families as of the last 10 years. It was originally intended to be located in Savannah, Georgia, but was eventually moved to its current position after disputes with residents over drumming and tourists. The village is constructed to be analogous to the villages of the traditional Yoruba city-states in modern-day Nigeria, although modernization of the village's public works have been carried out under Adefunmi II. It has become one of the premier tourists spots in the Low Country of South Carolina.

Following Adefunmi I's death in 2005, he was succeeded by his son, Oba Adejuyigbe Adefunmi II. In July 2024, Adefunmi II was fatally stabbed to death by his sister after a "heated argument". Adefumni II was pronounced dead at a nearby hospital.

== See also ==
- African Theological Archministry
