= Robert Smith (professor) =

- Born: 31 January 1919
- Died: 29 November 2009 (aged 90); London, England

Academic work
- Discipline: History

Robert Sidney Smith (31 January 1919 – 29 November 2009 in London, England) was an expert on the history of the Yoruba people of Nigeria and was a senior lecturer and then professor of history at the universities of Lagos, Ife and Ibadan. He was born on 31 January 1919. For many years, he lived near Kew Gardens in London and died in London on 29 November 2009.

Smith studied and taught at the Institute of African Studies in the University of Ibadan in Nigeria from its foundation in 1962.

Smith authored the following books:

- Kingdoms of the Yoruba (published by Methuen 1969)
- The Lagos Consulate (published by Macmillan)
- Warfare and Diplomacy in Pre-colonial West Africa (published by University of Wisconsin Press)

A festschrift was published in his honour Falola, Toyin & Law, Robin (eds.) (1992) Warfare and diplomacy in precolonial Nigeria: Essays in honor of Robert Smith, Madison, WI: University of Wisconsin.
