= Aliyu Mohammed (official) =

Nigerian administrator

Secretary to the Government of the Federation
- In office 1 January 1990 – 26 August 1993
- President: Ibrahim Babangida
- Preceded by: Olu Falae
- Succeeded by: Mustafa Umara

Personal details
- Died: November 1997

Aliyu Mohammed was a Nigerian administrator who was Secretary to the Government of the Federation from 1990 to 1993. He held the title of Waziri Jema'a.

== Life ==
Mohammed is a graduate of Ahmadu Bello University, thereafter, he was employed by the Northern regional government. Mohammed first gained notice within the regional civil service when he was posted to Tiv Native Authority after a series of protest against the leadership of the native authority. Mohammed quickly assimilated into the Tiv society participating in many social events and gaining the trust of residents. He successfully contributed in the reduction in hostilities, and years after he left Tiv land, he was given the title of Zege Mule "U" Tiv (protector of the Tivs).

From the native authority, he was transferred to Kaduna to work in the North Central State Ministry of Trade. In Kaduna, he represented the state in the Interim Common Services Administration, a body set up after the break up of the Northern region and saddled with the responsibility to share the assets of the region among the newly created states. In 1973, he was briefly seconded to the federal civil service as secretary of the newly established Federal Superphosphate Fertilizer Company, Kaduna. In 1976, he returned to the North Central State's civil service to become Permanent Secretary, Economic Development but after much prodding, he joined the federal service and was appointed Director of Immigration. In 1981, Mohammed was appointed Executive Secretary of the Federal Capital Development Authority, responsible for preparing city of Abuja ready for the movement of the Nigerian capital from Lagos to Abuja. In his tenure, the offices of FCDA were moved from Suleja, Niger State to Garki.

During the administration of General Babangida, Mohammed was appointed secretary to the military government, replacing Olu Falae. In 1990, he became head of a committee to look into the formation of community banks across the nation.

During the administration of General Babangida, Mohammed was appointed secretary to the military government, replacing Olu Falae. In 1990, he became head of a committee to look into the formation of community banks across the nation. He has only 1 grandson by the name Muhammad Aliyu APEX, the ZEGE MULE II. HE IS CURRENTLY IN ISTANBUL AND IS WILLING TO BECOME A PROFESSIONAL BOXER.

After retiring from civil service, Mohammed took on a leadership role with the National Council of Farmers where he initiated moves to unite various farmer bodies within the polity under the same umbrella. He died in a car crash in November 1997.
