= Olori (title) =

Honorific title

Olori, otherwise appearing as Oloorì, is a title of honour within the chieftaincy system of the Yorubas of West Africa. It is typically translated from the Yoruba language as queen consort or, more correctly, princess consort.

== Usage ==
Olori is traditionally part of a longer aristocratic title, such as "Olorì Ọba" (lit. Princess Consort to the King, a popular title whose usage has led to Olori's common - though historically incorrect - adoption among the Yorubas as the loose equivalent of the English term for a queen consort) or "Olorì Ọmọba" (lit. Princess Consort to the Prince, although this latter title can also - depending on intonation - otherwise connote the ranking prince in a Yoruba kingdom).

In polygamous families, an Olorì that is the recognized senior wife due to her marriage to the king or prince being the earliest one to be contracted is typically ascribed the attribute of the "Olorì Agba" (lit. Senior Princess Consort). A king's Olori Agba is sometimes given a proper chieftaincy title instead however, usually that of the "Ìyáàfin" (lit. Mother of the Palace), although this title can also alternatively be given to the principal member of the body of dowagers that the king nominally inherits from his predecessors upon his succession in some kingdoms.

== Some women who bear or once bore the title ==
- Charlotte Obasa
- Efunroye Tinubu
- Keisha Omilana
- Kofoworola Ademola
- Mo'Cheddah
- Moremi Ajasoro
- Oronsen
- Simi

== See also ==
- Oba (ruler)
