= Osupa =

Nigerian monarch

Ọ̀ṣùpá t'Àdó là wá (Ọ̀ṣùpá I)

34th Deji of Akure
- Reign: 1834–1846
- Coronation: 1834
- Predecessor: Osuan
- Successor: Agboyere
- Born: c. 1780; Akure
- Died: 1846 (aged 65–66); Akure
- Burial: Akure
- Spouse: Ọ̀bọ́wẹ̀, among others
- Issue (among others): Amorobiojo "Eye Aro"; Odundun I; Oluboyo; Adéẹkùn; Orímọlóyè
- House: Osupa
- Dynasty: Asodeboyede
- Father: Deji Arakale
- Mother: Adeubi
- Religion: Yoruba religion

Osupa I (Adesoro Olokunwolu; c. 1776/1780–1846) was a Yoruba monarch. He ruled the Akure Kingdom from 1834 until 1846.

His lineal descendants are today known as the House of Osupa. They serve as one of Akure's two legally recognized royal families.

== Early life ==
Òṣùpá t'Àdó là (which means "The moon has returned from Benin City and survived"), of the House of Asodeboyede, was born in Akure at some point in the late 18th century as Omoba Adésọ́rọ̀ Olokunwolu.

His paternage is uncertain. In most sources, his mother was said to be Adeubi, who was a daughter of Oba Ausi, the 31st Deji of Akure.

Some sources state that his father was Oba Osuan, and that he was a grandson of Oba Arakale. This is unlikely as Osuan is said to have challenged Osupa for the throne. What is most likely is that he was one of the many children of Arakale.

In around 1818, the Benin empire invaded Akure, executed the reigning monarch, Arakale (who may have been his father) and carted away a number of hostages. Osupa was one of them, and he thereafter was forced to spend an extended period in Benin City, where he narrowly escaped execution.

== Reign ==
By the time that Osupa was allowed to return home by the Binis, his kingdom was in need of a king. With the support of the Ado Akure, a community of Akures that had ancestral links to Benin, he contested for the throne and was successfully chosen as the 34th Deji of Akure in 1834.

Following his coronation, one of his first acts was to settle the Ado Akures in the Igbeyin and Eyinke quarters of the town. He also bestowed chieftaincy titles upon them at this time, thus for the first time integrating into Akure a community that had been seen up to that point as everything from a colony to an army of occupation.

Osupa then went on to establish Akure as an important vassal state of the Benin empire. His regular payment of tribute to the Benin palace started a tradition that lasted until the reign of his son Odundun I later in the century.

== Death and legacy ==
Osupa died in 1846. His daughter, Amorobiojo, served as Deji from 1850 to 1851, a rare feat for a woman. After the reign of his son Aladelusi, who became Oba Odundun, his direct lineage wouldn't produce another monarch for the duration of the succeeding century. In the early 1990s, the Osupa family was recognized as one of the official ruling houses of the Akure Kingdom by the military administration of Ondo State. It has since provided two further monarchs, including current incumbent Oba Odundun II.

Prince Dr Adebimpe Ige Ogunleye a prominent Akure prince is the head of oba osupa ruling house and it is a known fact and undisputed. He together with some respected elders of oba osupa family fought for the creation of oba osupa ruling under military gov of old ondo state late retired Commodore Olukoya in 1991 Deji of Akureland chieftaincy Declaration laws of Ondo State which the then Deji of Akureland late Kabiesyi Oba Atayese Adebobajo Adesida111 sign to for the breaking of Asodeboye ruling house into two ruling houses of Oba Osupa Ruling house(Odundun) and Ojijigogun Ruling House(Adesida, Arosoye, Ifaturoti). The fight for oba osupa ruling house started in the 80s under former Gov Ajasin, when the Ondo State Chieftaincy review commission of Justice Adeyinka Morgan was inaugurated to look into the Chieftaincy in ondo state.

For a number of years, it was believed that another descendant of Oba Osupa I was Adepoju Adesina, who styled himself Osupa III of Akure and who ruled Akure from 2005 until he was deposed by the government in 2010. Many Akure historians have since suggested that he bribed his way to the throne in the first place by giving the kingmakers about 20 million naira. He supposedly couldn't prove how he was descended from Osupa I. The current head of the Osupa ruling house, Odundun II, who is Oba Osupa's second great-grandson through Osupa's son Odundun, has also said that he was never a member of the royal family.

== See also ==
- Oba of Benin
