= Oba (ruler) =

Word meaning "ruler" in the Yoruba language

Oba (Yoruba: ọba, lit. 'King') is a pre-nominal honorific for kings in Yorubaland, and by extension the Kingdom of Benin.

According to Yoruba mythology, the first oba was Oduduwa, the legendary progenitor of the Yoruba people. Many royal lineages claim descent from him, including that of the Ooni of Ife, Alaafin of Oyo, Awujale of Ijebuland, Oba of Benin, Olu of Warri and many others. Obas served as the spiritual, cultural, and sometimes political leaders of a town, city, or kingdom. In the present day Obas are highly respected figures who trace their lineage back to the earliest Yoruba kingdoms, particularly Ile-Ife, which is considered the spiritual and historical origin of the Yoruba. Although the Benin Kingdom is Edo and not located within Yorubaland, its Oba ruling dynasty traces its origin to Ile-Ife.

The title is distinct from that of Oloye in Yorubaland, which is itself used in like fashion by subordinate titleholders in the contemporary Yoruba chieftaincy system.

== Historical origins of the Oba title ==
Ile-Ife, often regarded as the spiritual and cultural heart of the Yoruba people, is widely recognized as the origin point of the Oba title and dynastic system. According to Yoruba tradition, Ile-Ife is where Oduduwa, a foundational figure in Yoruba mythology, descended from Oke Ora and emerged as a leader, establishing a centralized monarchy. Oduduwa’s reign marked the beginning of a new oba system, with the title "Oba" (meaning king) becoming synonymous with Yoruba rulership. The title was also associated with the earliest rulers like Obatala.

== Aristocratic titles among the Yoruba ==
The Yoruba chieftaincy system can be divided into four separate ranks: royal chiefs, noble chiefs, religious chiefs and common chiefs. The royals are led by the obas, who sit at the apex of the hierarchy and serve as the fons honorum of the entire system. They are joined in the class of royal chiefs by the titled dynasts of their royal families. The three other ranks, who traditionally provide the membership of a series of privy councils, sects and guilds, oversee the day-to-day administration of the Yoruba traditional states and are led by the iwarefas, the arabas and the titled elders of the kingdoms' constituent families.

== Oba ==
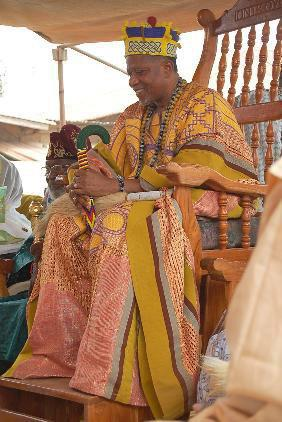
Oba Abessan V, the Onikoyi of Porto-Novo, Benin

There are two different kinds of Yoruba monarchs: The kings of Yoruba clans, which are often simply networks of related towns (For example, the oba of the Egba bears the title "Aláké" because his ancestral seat is the Aké quarter of Abeokuta, hence the title Aláké, which is Yoruba for One who owns Aké. The Ọ̀yọ́ ọba, meanwhile, bears the title "Alaafin", which means One who owns the palace) and the kings of individual Yoruba towns, such as that of Iwo — a town in Osun State — who bears the title "Olúwòó" (Olú ti Ìwó, lit. 'Lord of Iwo').

The first-generation towns of the Yoruba homeland, which encompasses large swathes of Benin, Nigeria, and Togo, are those with obas who generally wear beaded crowns; the rulers of many of the 'second generation' settlements are also often obas. Those that remain and those of the third generation tend to only be headed by the holders of the title "Baálẹ̀" (lit. 'Father of the land - Iba-Ilẹ̀'), who do not wear crowns and who are, at least in theory, the reigning viceroys of people who do.

== Oloye ==
All of the subordinate members of the Yoruba aristocracy, both traditional chieftains and honorary ones, use the pre-nominal "Olóyè" (lit. 'Lord of a title - Olu-óyè', also appearing as "Ìjòyè" meaning conglomerate of titles) in the way that kings and queens regnant use 'Ọba'. It is also often used by princes and princesses in colloquial situations, though the title that is most often ascribed to them officially is "Ọmọba" (lit. 'Child of a Monarch', a contraction of the alternatively rendered "Ọmọọba", "Ọmọ ọba" and "Ọmọ-ọba"). The wives of kings, princes and chiefs of royal background usually make use of the title "Olorì" (the equivalent of Princess Consort), though some of the wives of dynastic rulers prefer to be referred to as "Ayaba" (contraction of 'Aya Oba', lit. "wife of the Oba," the equivalent of Queen Consort). The wives of the non-royal chiefs, when themselves titleholders in their own right, tend to use the honorific "Ìyálóyè" (lit. 'Mother who owns a title') in their capacities as married chieftesses.

== The Oba's crown ==
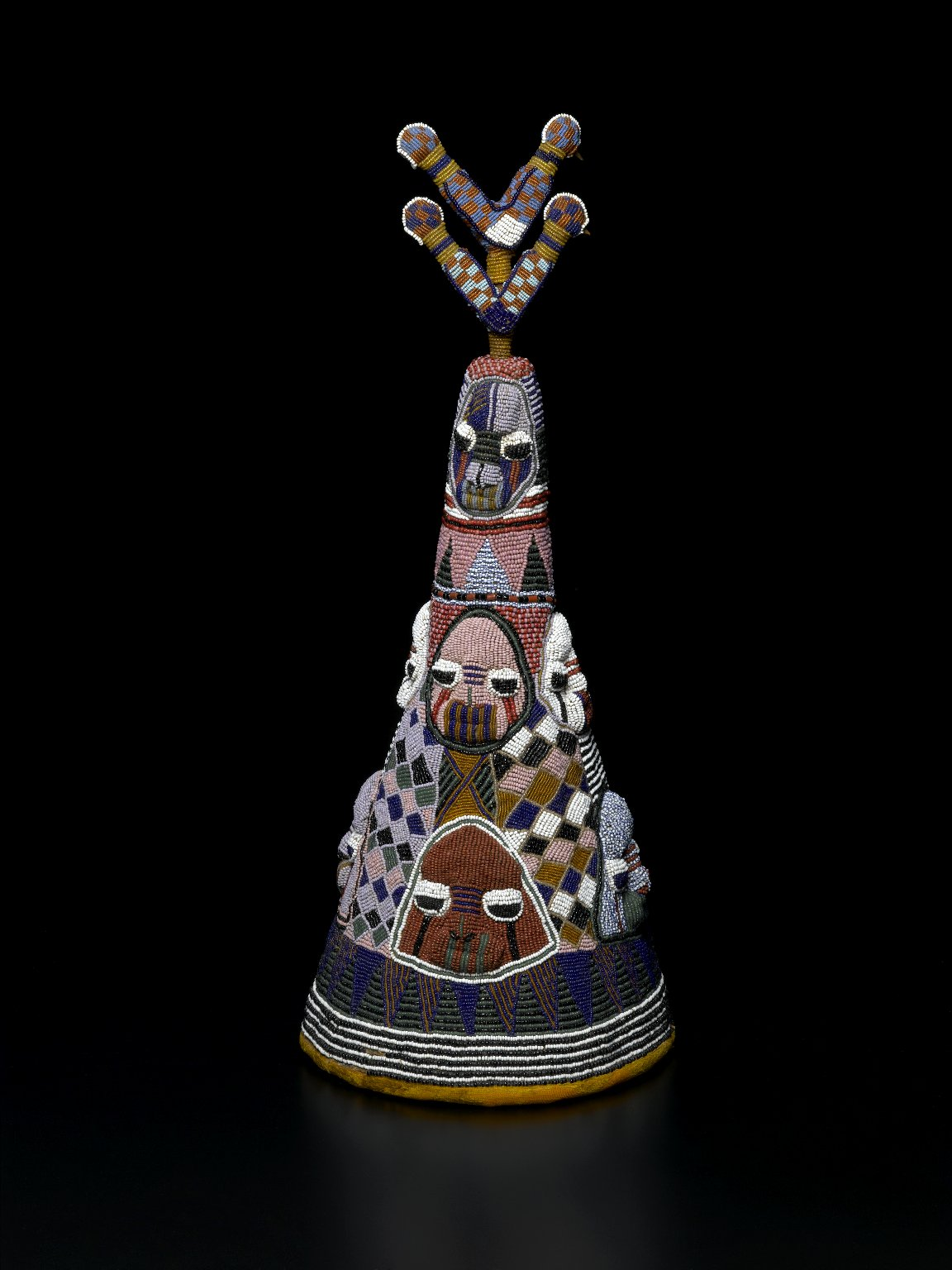
The Beaded Crown "Ade" of Oba Onijagbo Obasoro Alowolodu, the Ogoga of Ikere.

The bead-embroidered crown with beaded veil, foremost attribute of the Oba, symbolizes the aspirations of a civilization at the highest level of authority. In his seminal article on the topic, Robert F. Thompson writes, "The crown incarnates the intuition of royal ancestral force, the revelation of great moral insight in the person of the king, and the glitter of aesthetic experiences."

== Items of office ==
The following items or accessories of office often accompany the position of Obaship in Yorubaland.

- Ade - Royal crown - The ultimate symbol of authority. Distributed from Ife to all original Obas.
- Irukere - Royal Horsetail - Symbol of grace and peace.
- Odigba - Collar of beads. Also known as the Ejigba and Edigba.
- Opa Ase - Scepter of authority, also known as Opa ileke.
- Ada - Sword of justice, state sword always brought from Ife and invested on all original Obas during coronation.
- Ileke - Beads (Coral or Glass).
- Agba - State drums beaten for the Oba. Also called Gbedu, it is the largest of the Yoruba drums.
- Ewu Ileke - Beaded gown or tunic, also known as Ewu okun, Including beaded footwear (Bata ileke).

== Royal duties ==
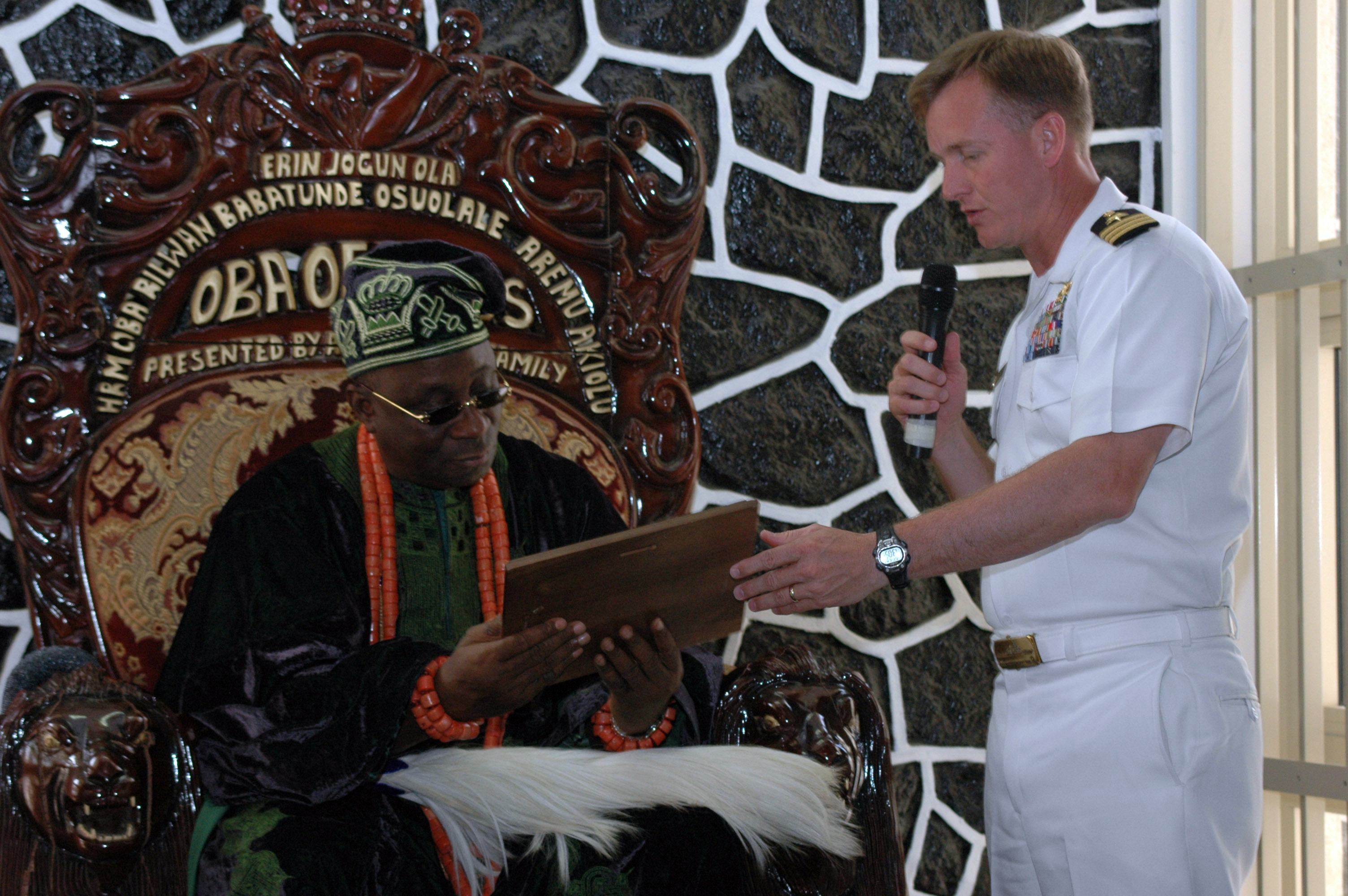
In June of 2006, the USS Barry's commanding officer, Cmdr. Jeffrey Wolstenholme, presented Oba Rilwan Akiolu, the Oba of Lagos, with a ship's plaque during his ship's visit to his kingdom.

The role of the oba has diminished with the coming of colonial and democratic institutions. However, an event that still has symbolic prestige and capital is that of chieftaincy title-taking and awarding. This dates back to the era of the Oyo warrior chiefs and palace officials in the medieval period, when powerful individuals of varied ancestries held prominent titles in the empire. In Yorubaland, like in many other areas of Benin, Nigeria and Togo, chieftaincy titles are mostly given to successful men and women from within a given sub-sectional territory, although it is not unheard of for a person from elsewhere to receive one. The titles also act as symbolic capital that can be used to gain favour when desired by the individual oba that awarded them, and sometimes vice versa. During any of the traditional investiture ceremonies for the chiefs-designate, the oba is regarded by the Yoruba as the major centre of attention, taking precedence over even the members of the official governments of any of the three countries if they are present.

As the oba leads the procession of nominees into a specially embroidered dais in front of a wider audience of guests and well-wishers, festivities of varied sorts occur to the accompaniment of traditional drumming. Emblems are given out according to seniority, and drapery worn by the oba and chiefs are created to be elaborate and also expensive. Most of the activities are covered by the local media and enter the public domain thereafter. Only the secret initiations for traditional chiefs of the highest rank are kept a secret from all outsiders. Ceremonies such as this, and the process of selection and maintenance of networks of chiefs, are two of the major sources of power for the contemporary royals of West Africa.

== Priestly duties ==
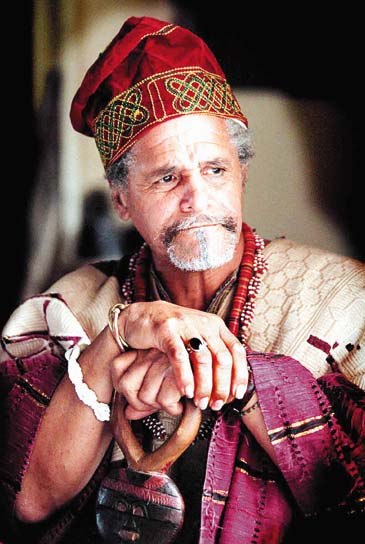
Oba Adefunmi I of Oyotunji, U.S.A.

As a sacred ruler, the oba is traditionally regarded by the Yoruba as the ex officio chief priest of all of the Orisha sects in his or her domain. Although most of the day-to-day functions of this position are delegated in practice to such figures as the arabas, certain traditional rites of the Yoruba religion can only be performed by the oba, and it is for this reason that the holders of the title are often thought of as being religious leaders in addition to being politico-ceremonial monarchs.

== See also ==
- Babalawo
- Eso Ikoyi
- Nigerian chieftaincy
- Nigerian traditional rulers
- Ogboni
- Olori
