= Ife Empire =

Former empire in Western Africa

Empire of Ife
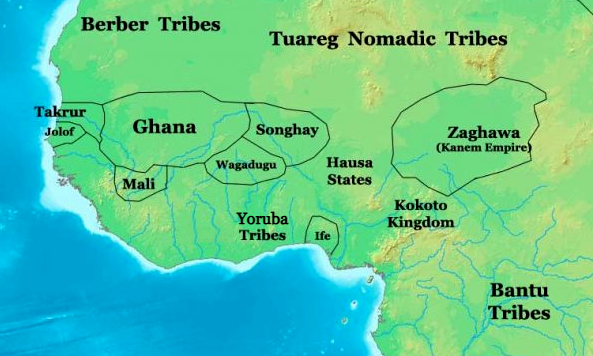
- c. 1000 – 1420 Ife Empire in the 14th century showing some pre-dynastic and dynastic Yoruba groups Area and Influence of Ife by 1000 AD, and the neighboring Kingdoms and peoples of Western Africa
- Status: Empire
- Capital: Ilé-Ifẹ̀ 105,000—150,000 Population c. 14th Century
- Common languages: Yoruba
- Religion: Yoruba religion, Islam
- Government: Elective Monarchy
- Oba
- Legislature: Imọlẹ (Incl. The Iharẹ Mẹfa)
- Historical era: Postclassical Era

Area
- Mid 14th century: 52,000 km^{2} (20,000 sq mi)
- Currency: Possibly Glass beads
Preceded by
Ife Confederation (Elu mẹtala)
Succeeded by
Oyo Empire
Benin Kingdom
Ijebu Kingdom
- Today part of: Nigeria; Benin

The Ife Empire was the first empire in Yoruba history. It was founded in what is now southwestern Nigeria and eastern Benin. A classical period starting from 1000 to 1420 CE, marked the age of its most well known sophisticated art pieces. Although Yoruba was the main language of the empire, there were also various spoken dialects and languages. It rose to power through trade with Sahelian and forest states. Its capital city, Ilé-Ife, was one of the largest urban centers in 14th century West Africa.

== Formation and early history ==
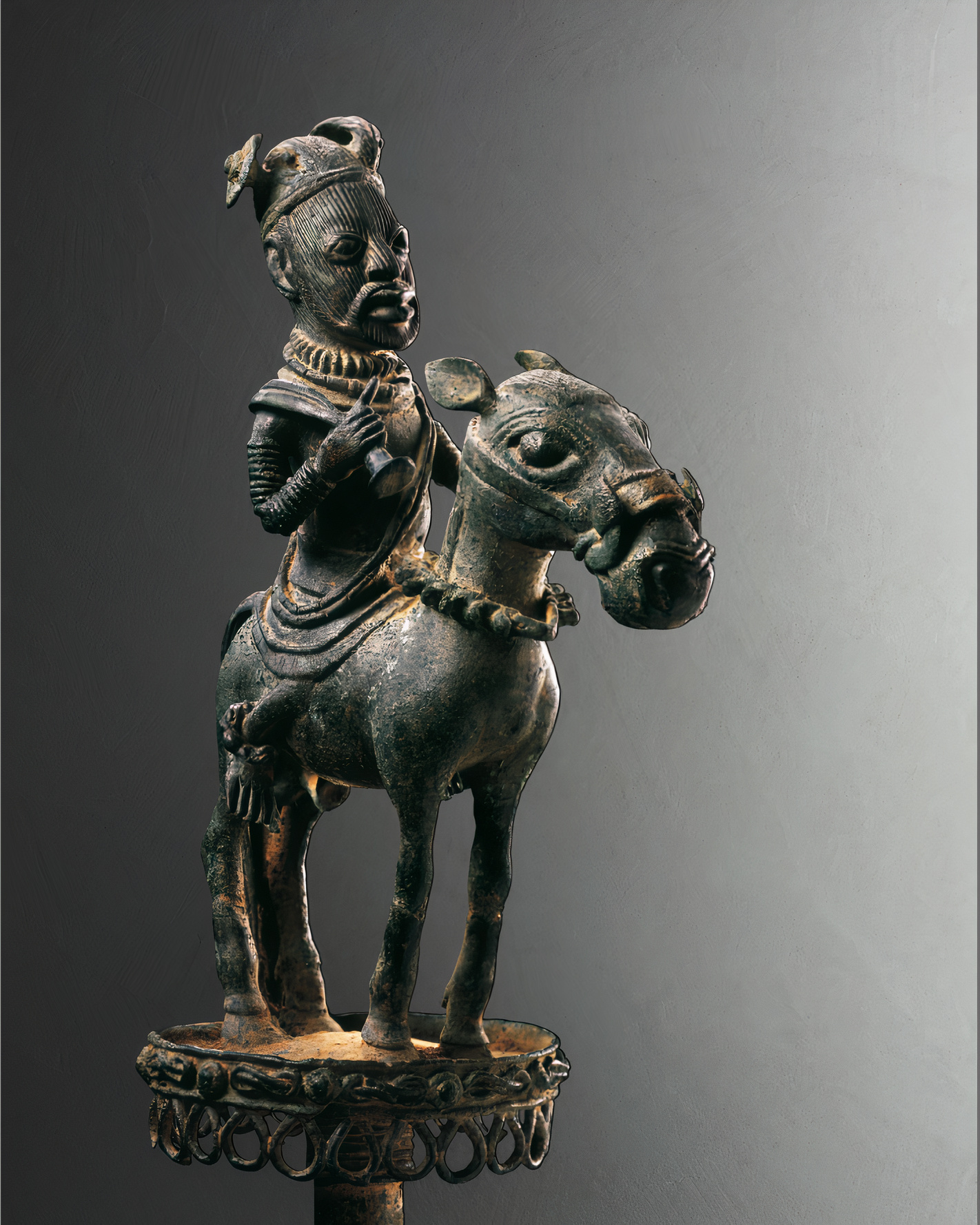
Copper alloy sceptre with Horse riding figure of a king or high-ranking noble of Ife. Dating to the 12th –13th century CE. The vertical facial striation marks that typify early ife art is evident

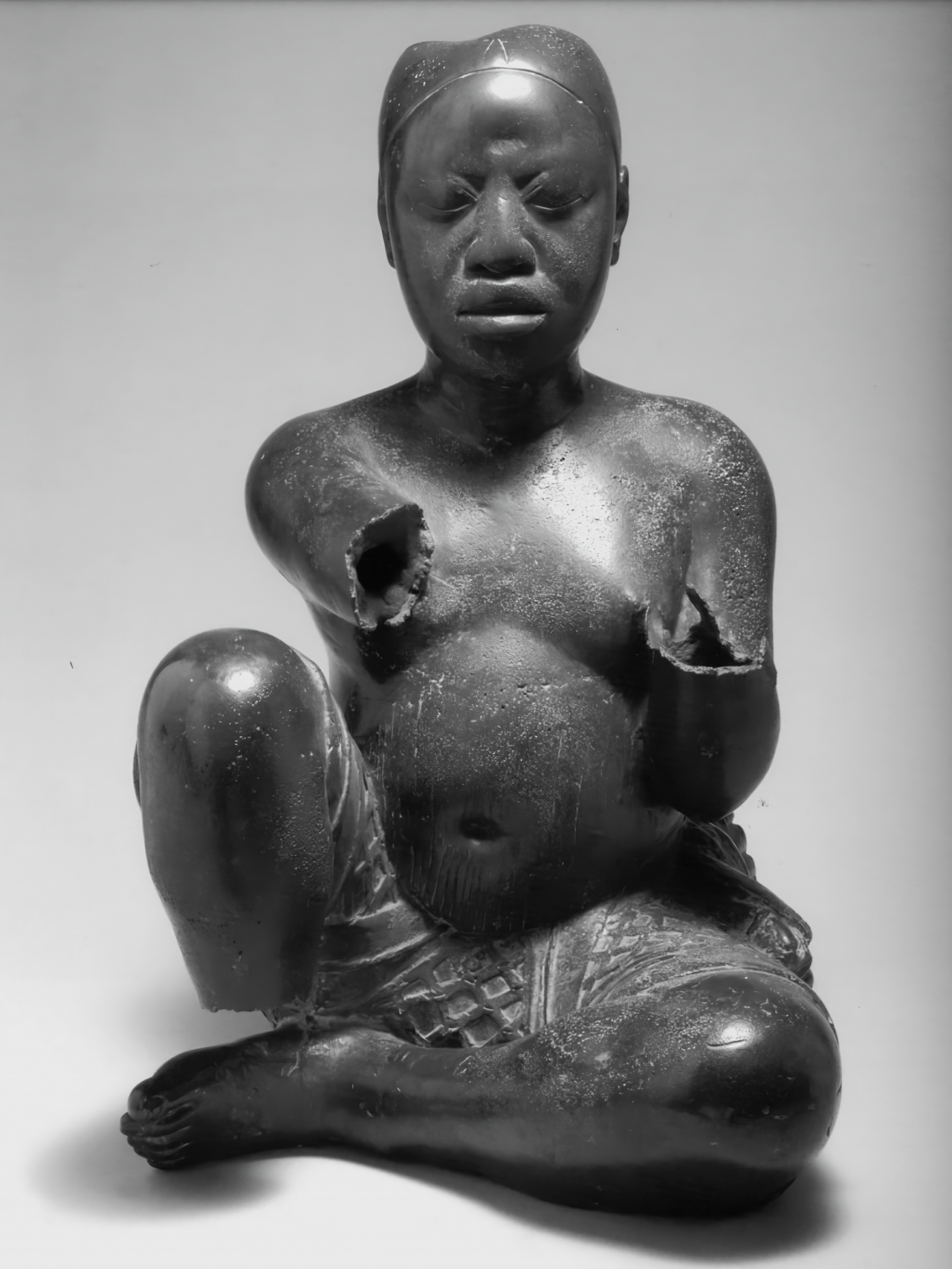
12th to 15th century copper Ife statue

The Ife region began as a small collection of house societies in mid-first millennium BCE, which over time grew to become “mega houses”, or mini-states, due to competition for resources. Over time, as managing resources, population, and conflicts presented opportunities for new organizational structures, several of the mega-houses started organizing themselves into confederacy-like associations. The most prominent of these was the Ife “confederacy". Conflicts over resources continued however, exacerbated by the aridity and a rising population.

During said conflicts, a group of people led by a leader named Odùduwà emerged, who most likely came from Oke Ora, a hilltop settlement to the east, and built a large perimeter wall between the 10th to 11th centuries. Measuring about 7 km (4.3 mi) in circumference and 2.3 km (1.4 mi) in diameter, this wall would soon become the core urban center of Ilé-Ifè. The building of the wall led to a massive conflict between the Odùduwà group and another mega-house(consisting of the original indigenous population of Ilé-Ifè), led by a man named Obatálá. The Odùduwà group ended up winning the conflict.

Leaders such as Odùduwà and Obatálá would later be deified after death, becoming core members of the Yoruba traditional religion pantheon of divinities.

According to oral traditions, a conference was soon held at Ita Ijero, a town in Ilé-Ifè following the triumph of the Odùduwà group in the Obatálá-Odùduwà conflict. At the end of the conference, each of the princes (princes here meaning group members) present left to establish his or her own kingdom such as Benin and Oyo, with the promise that they would all keep in touch as siblings and support one another in times of trouble.

Benin, one such of the kingdoms under Ife, was brought under Ife's rule when Oranmiyan, a Yoruba prince, was invited by Benin kingmakers to overthrow the former Benin ruling dynasty, the Ogiso dynasty, and establish a new one, the Oba dynasty. Modern scholars place this event as happening between ca. 1200 and ca. 1250. It was under Oranmiyan that the country received a new name: Ile-Ibinu (from its former name of Igodomigodo), which would later be corrupted to "Benin".

== Classical Period (1000–1420 AD) ==
House of Oduduwa
- Yoruba royal dynasty
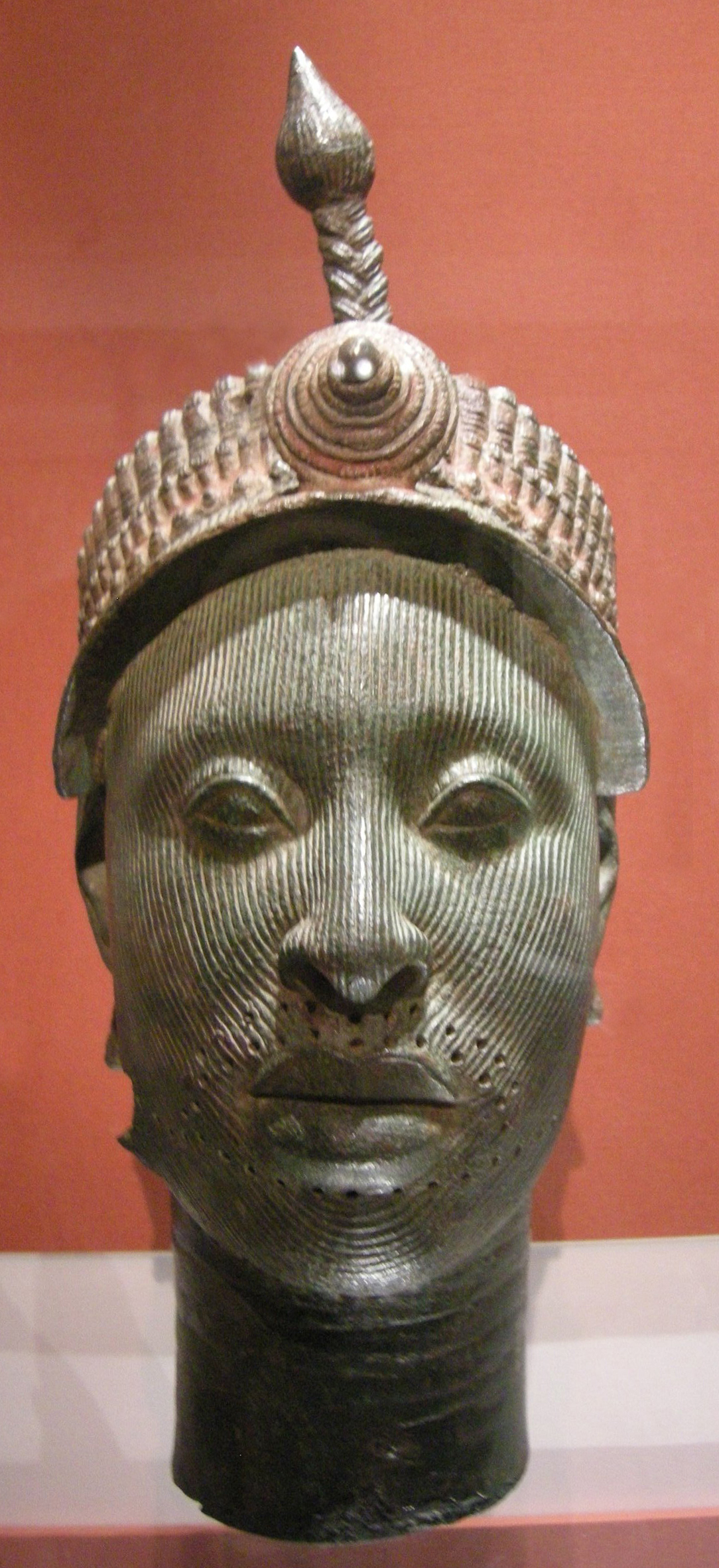
- Ife Head, relic of the royal cult of an ancient Ooni of Ile-Ife and heraldic symbol of Ife royalty
- Parent house: Varies: Oke Ora (Historically); Olodumare (God) (Philosophically)
- Current region: Yorubaland
- Founded: c.10th century
- Founder: Oduduwa
- Current head: Ojaja II
- Titles: Oba, Ooni of Ile-Ife; Oba, Olofin Adimula of Ile-Ife; Oba Obirin of Ile-Ife; Oloye of Ile-Ife; Yeyeluwa of Ile-Ife; Omoba of Ile-Ife; Oloori of Ile-Ife
- Styles: Kabiyesi; Majesty; Imperial Highness
- Members: Olubuse II; Adesoji Aderemi; Tejumade Alakija
- Connected families: Oyo royal family Bini royal family
- Traditions: Ìṣẹ̀ṣe; Christianity; Islam
- Motto: Ilé Ifẹ̀ Orírun Ayé, Ibi tí ojúmọ́ ti ń mọ́ wá. (Yoruba:Ife, source origin of the World, the place where dawn begins.)
- Cadet branches: In Ife (4): Oshinkola of Iremo; Giesi of Moore; Ogboru of Ilare; Lafogido of Okerewe; Outside Ife (Several): Oyo royal family; Bini royal family; Ketu royal family; Various royal families across Yorubaland.

Once the Obatálá-Odùduwà conflict ended, a new era began, known as the Classical period. The sociopolitical outcome of the following instability was qualitatively different from that of the preceding era. The hallmarks of the Classical period include the development of an urban capital with concentric embankments. There were also life-size terracotta and copper or brass sculptures with detailed, idealized naturalism.

Craft specialization defined everyday economic life in which the production of high-value crafts, such as glass-bead production, featured prominently. Ife grew to have a robust industry in metals, producing high-quality iron and steel.

As the population grew, a second wall was built in the capital city Ilé-Ife during the thirteenth century and the construction and pavement of several major roads began as well. The occurrence of potsherd pavements in virtually every part of the area within the Inner and Outer Walls and beyond indicate that the city was densely populated. It is estimated that the city of Ilé-Ifè had a population of 70,000–105,000 during the mid-fourteenth century.

Ife's prominence grew so much that it was even possibly mentioned on a 1375 Catalan trade map known as the Catalan Atlas, and the Castilian Book of All Kingdoms under the name Rey de Organa or Kingdom of Organa. The name Organa might allude to the title of first dynasty of Ife rulers, i.e. Ógáne (Óghéné, Ógéne̩). The same name is referenced in a Portuguese account from the 1480s about an inland ruler who played a central role in Benin royal enthronements. The name Organa has alternatively been identified with the Kanem–Bornu Empire.

At its zenith in the 14th century, the Ife empire stretched across around three hundred kilometers or one hundred eighty-six miles, and encompassed Owu, Jebba, Tada, and Oyo in the north and Ijebu in the south. However Ife's cultural influence spanned westward all the way to southwestern Togo.

As Ife grew, it became more ethnically diverse, with the northern parts of Ife around the Niger River and in Oyo having multiple other ethnic groups living with the Yorubas; the Nupe, Ìbàrìbá, and various Songhai peoples of which the Djerma were the most prominent. These various ethnic groups all migrated to Ife for commercial and resource opportunities. The Djerma, or Zarma, were the main carriers of Yoruba goods into the Sahel during the Classical period, and showed a good amount of political and religious influence.

=== Trade ===
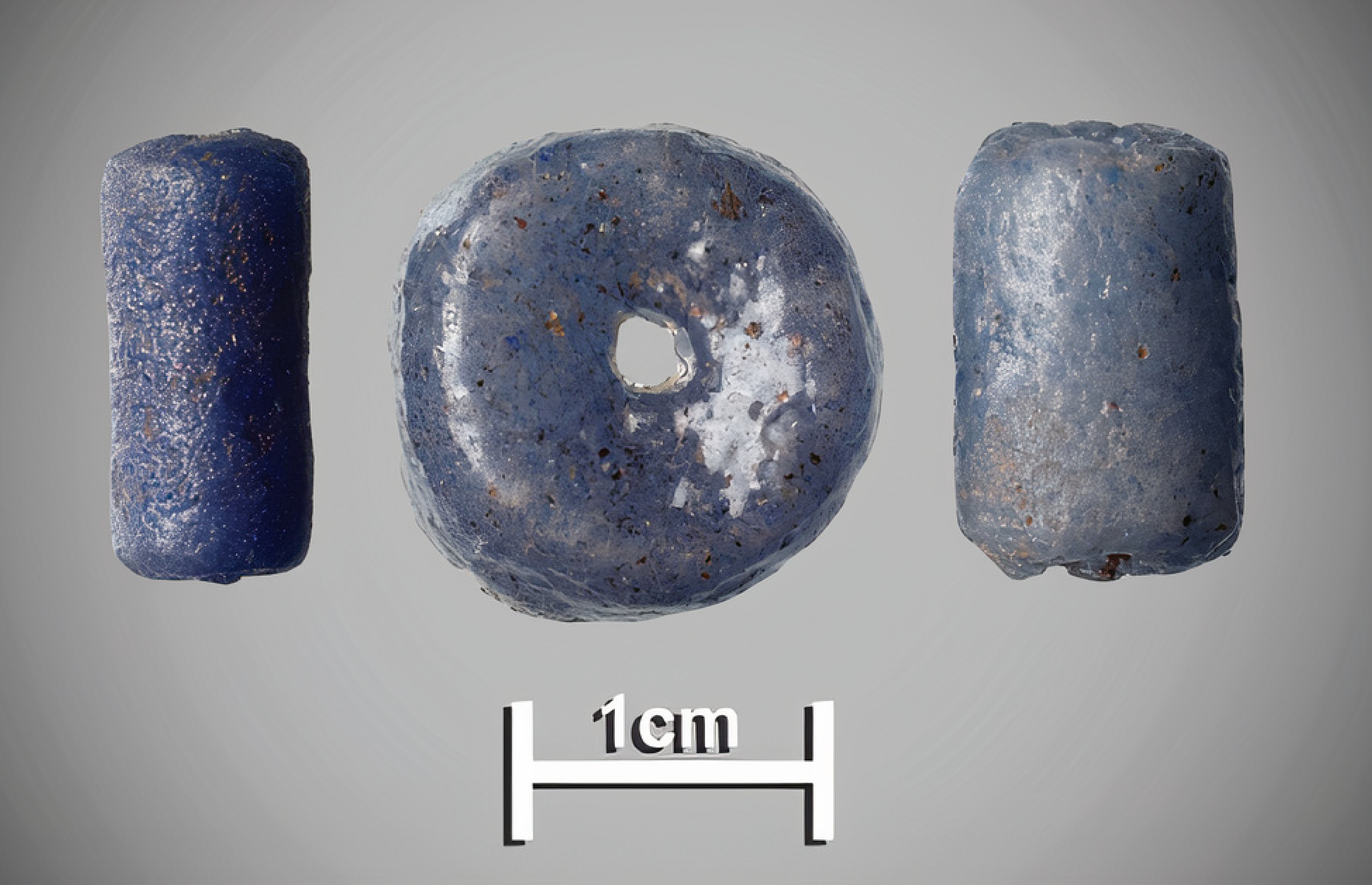
Glass segi bead from Ile-Ife

The Ife Empire was one of the oldest trading empires in West Africa and an early partner in the trans-Saharan trade. One of Ife's earliest trade routes was up the Niger to Gao, the route became active as early as the ninth century.

Glass beads were one of the most sought-after items in West Africa during this time and Ife had a near monopoly of this market. Ife was likely the third place in the world glass was indigenously invented. Dichroic glass beads from Ilé-Ifè have been found at Tié in Chad, Kissi in Burkina Faso, Diouboye in Senegal, Gao Ancien, Essouk in Mali, and Koumbi Saleh in Mauritania, all in twelfth- to fourteenth-century contexts. Ilé-Ifè was the only known industrial center for HLHA glass production. Glass beads were used as a form of currency in Ife, and strings and other standard measurements of Segi beads were used for purchasing high value products and services.

Ife's fame spread far and wide; In 1352, Ibn Battuta was informed during his visit to Mali about a powerful black Pagan kingdom to the south called Yufi, which he described as “one of the most considerable countries of the Sudan, and their sultan, one of the greatest sultans". He goes on further calling Yufi as a country that “no white man can enter . . . because the negroes will kill him before he arrives”, "White man" probably meaning Arabs or Berbers. Ife was almost certainly Yufi, Akinwumi Ogundiran writes. He continues

Ilé-Ifè was the largest urban center, the biggest emporium, and the wealthiest polity in West Africa's rain forest belt south of the Niger River during the mid-fourteenth century, with more than two centuries of trading contact with the Western Sudan. On account of these facts alone, it is the best match for Ibn Battuta's Yufi. Moreover, on linguistic grounds, Yufi is a Mandé or an Arabic transliteration of “Ufè,” the proper name for “Ifè” in a central Yorùbá dialect.

The Bead Road is the name given by Akinwumi Ogundiran of the trade route which stretched from Ilé-Ifè to the Moshi-Niger area and as far as the Niger Bend in present-day Mali. Another possible mention of Ife are the records of 11th to 14th century Arab scholars that reveal trade in blue dichroic West African glass beads. Items traded to Ife were Saharan copper and salt, Mediterranean and Chinese silk and other clothing materials, they entering the region from across the Niger by the eleventh or twelfth century. In exchange, Ife would trade sundry rainforest goods, of which glass beads and ivory were the most highly prized.

Ife was also likely a part of the Silk Trade on the Silk Road between the twelfth through fifteenth centuries, with long-distance trade routes going up all the way to Nubia from Kanem during the 1300s. Evidence for this are coptic cross motifs found on objects, burial sites, and statues in the Ife Empire region. Historic Ife ritual contexts also suggest possible early Coptic Christian contact through long-distance trade. There is also likely Ife regalia modeled on an ancient Nubian shield ring that probably reached the area between the twelfth through fourteenth Century era through trade.

Evidence also shows that during Ife's time period, Yorubaland was involved in trade with southwestern Cameroon.

=== Agriculture ===
Recent archaeological findings have provided new insights into the crops cultivated and the trade networks that influenced agricultural practices in the region. Excavations have revealed a variety of plant remains. The primary crops identified include Cowpea, Okra, Palm oil, Pearl millet, Sorghum, Cotton, and Wheat.

Cotton remains date back to the 11th-12th centuries, marking the earliest known use of this crop south of the Sahara. The presence of cotton suggests a significant textile industry in ancient Ife. Wheat remains date back to the 13th-14th centuries. This temperate crop, unsuited to the region's humid climate, was likely introduced through trade. The large collection of wheat remains found at the site is the most extensive in Sub-Saharan Africa. Wheat's restricted presence suggests it was a specialty crop, possibly consumed by elites or individuals involved in trade. Wheat likely arrived in Ife through Trans-Saharan trade routes, highlighting the region's integration into broader trade networks. Livestock such as sheep and goats were also kept.

=== Architecture ===
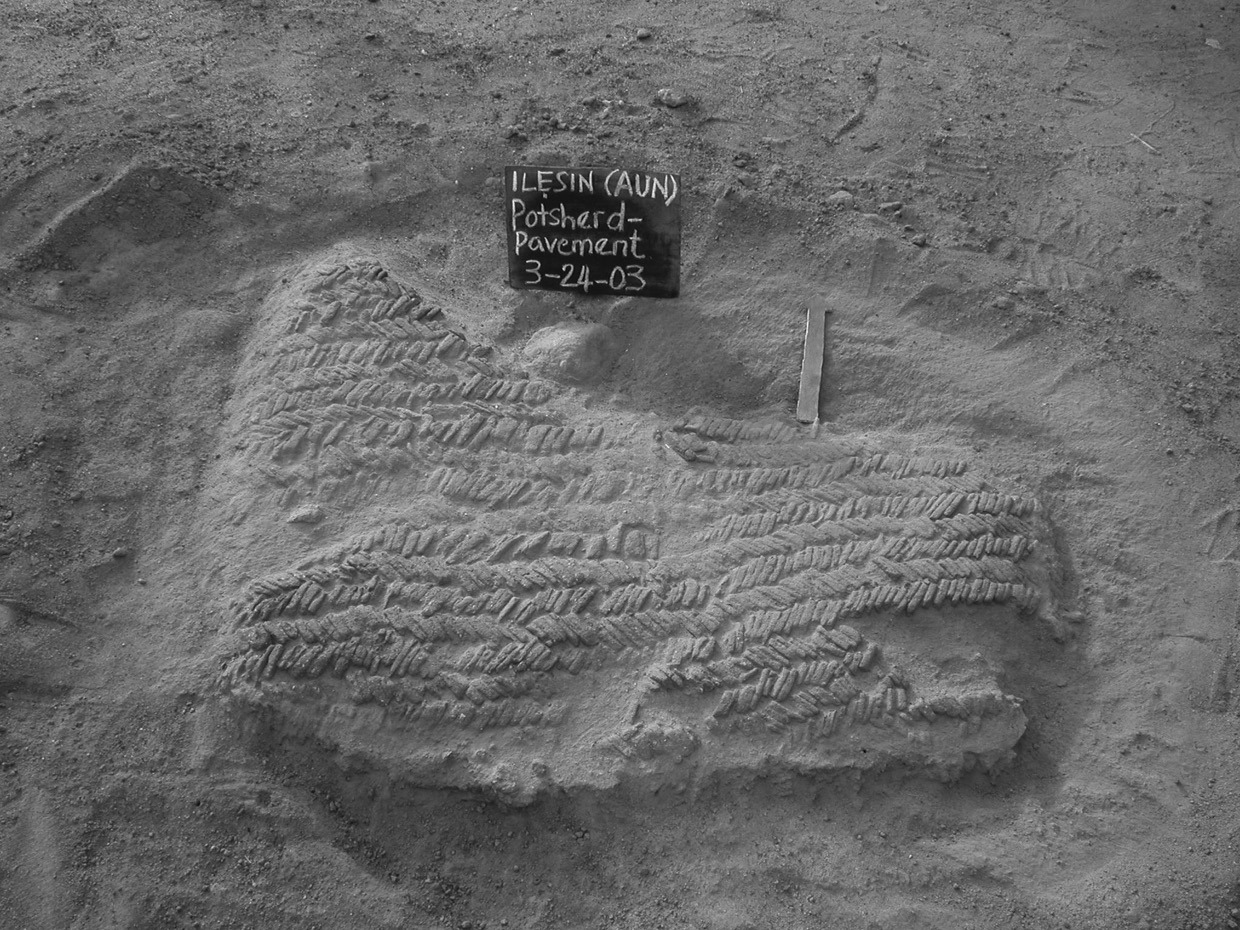
Remnants of Ife pavements

Floors were paved with potsherd tiles, ceramic tiles, and cobblestone. The walls and columns of elite buildings were decorated with ceramic disks. Most of the potsherd tiles were arranged linearly in herringbone patterns, and colored sherds were arranged in geometric mosaics. It appears that between the 13th and 14th centuries, potsherd pavements had become a pan-regional architectural style and nearly every state in the Ife Empire had Paved flooring, even as far as modern-day Togo. Leo Frobenius, a 20th-century archeologist who visited Nigeria, also noted that the foundations of historical buildings at Ile-Ife were built of burnt bricks. By the early 20th century, he said Ife's architecture has greatly regressed from what it reached in antiquity. The capital Ile Ife was surrounded by two concentric walls, which were around 15 feet high and 6 feet thick. Remains of impluvia, paved with Potsherds and Quartz stone, have been revealed through archaeological work. The impluvia were drained by clay or grindstone pipes underneath the floor.

=== Military and Conflicts ===
Ife wasn't as imperialistic as many other empires and spread influence primarily through its cultural, religious, and economic superiority over other Yoruba states. Though it may have had some form of military and was probably involved in a few armed conflicts.

One of Ife's northernmost provinces, Owu, controlled the trade connecting the rest of Ife and western Sudan, where Ifè glass beads passed into the Middle Niger valley. With control of the trade and profit they began buying horses from the Wasangari, Mossi, Mandé, and Songhai in the early 14th century, and became the first cavalry state in Ife. Owu's newfound power expanded rapidly with the use of cavalry and Òwu began to undermine the commercial and political interests of Ifè, and eventually declared war on Ife, starting a civil war.

Evidence also shows Ife was likely dealing with Islamic expansions during the 14th century. A group of rock carvings found around nine miles south of Ife show carved images including hands holding a sword, bound arms, a decapitated man, another sword, two clusters of spears, a tortoise, a snake, what seems to be a leopard, and a Muslim prayer board. The carving seems to depict a battle. Since the carving shows Obatala linked animals and a Muslim prayer board it likely implies that the battle that took place involved people from local and foreign religions (Islam). The battle seems all the more significant considering the interest shown in providing evidence of it. The Muslim prayer board offers evidence that the wars that were taking place in the Ife area, as with regions to the north and east in this era (from modern Chad to Mali), involved local populations in contestation with Islamic troops.

Sculptures give insight into what the military of the Ife Empire looked like during the 14th century. They were equipped with a range of gear and weapons. A copper sculpture from Jebba Island portrays an archer wearing an armored tunic made of strip leather, a knife hilt secured in the tunic's front, along with a quiver and throwing stick on their back. The armor is similar to the coat of mail worn by populations in Bornu.

Portrayals of weaponry in Ife art hint at historical changes in armament forms in this era. Hausa style knives and sheathes were said to have been found at Ita Yemoo, a site at Ile-Ife. This may relate to oral traditions that say the forces of Ọranmiyan that gave rise to his new dynasty may have employed new weaponry forms such as long-bladed metal battle knives.

=== Decline ===
Many factors led to Ife's ultimate demise by 1420. These included long spells of drought that kicked off around 1380 across West and East Africa, political disturbances in Western Sudan like the collapse of the Mali Empire, internal crisis within the Ife Empire, and an epidemic that was most likely smallpox or the black death.
