= Oduduwa =

Yoruba king and deity

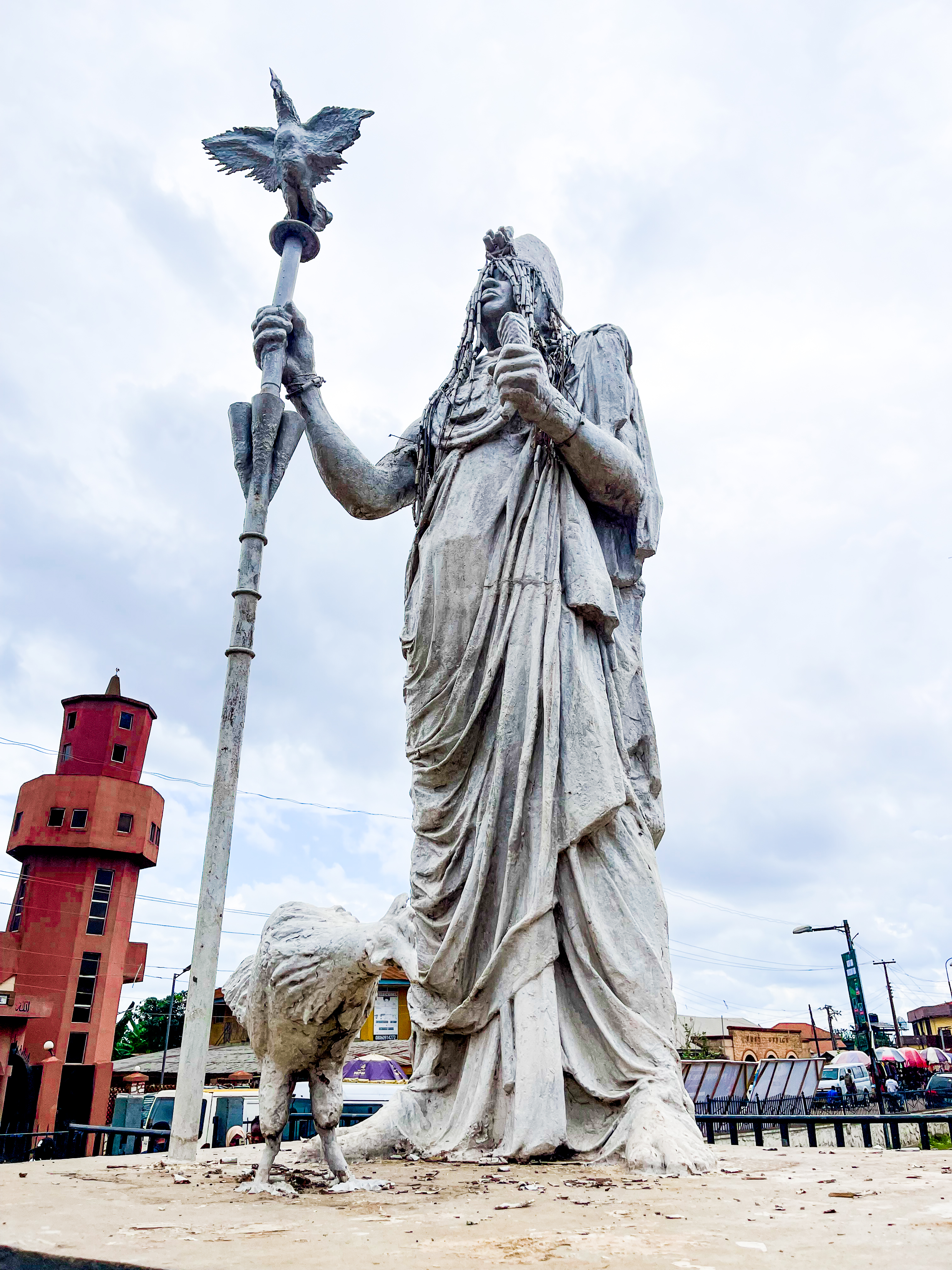
A statue of Oduduwa

Odùduwà (also pronounced Ooduwa, Odudua or Oòdua) was a Yoruba divine king, an Oriṣa in the Yoruba religion, and the progenitor who ushered in the classical period that later led to the foundation of the Ife Empire. His earthly origins are from the village of Oke Ora. According to tradition, he was the holder of the title of the Olofin of Ile-Ife, the Yoruba holy city. He ruled there briefly and also served as the progenitor of a number of independent royal dynasties in Yorubaland, with the praise names Olofin Adimula and Olofin Ayé.

Archaeologists and historians estimate Oduduwa's kingly existence to the Late Formative Period of Ife (800 – 1000 CE), which aligns with indigenous Yoruba oral chronology. However, Yoruba religious adherents take it one step further – explaining that spiritually, Oduduwa, together with Ọbatala, are aligned with creator divinities that, being cloaked in human form and as old as the earth itself, took part in the creation of all that is. This spiritual figure, referred to as 'Oduduwa', is often thought to be distinct from the historical figure who later reigned as Olofin.

== Etymology ==
The etymological derivation of the Yoruba name "Oduduwa" is Odu-ti-o-da-iwa. This translates literally to "the great repository which brings forth existence".

== Ifẹ traditions ==
House of Oduduwa
- Yoruba royal dynasty
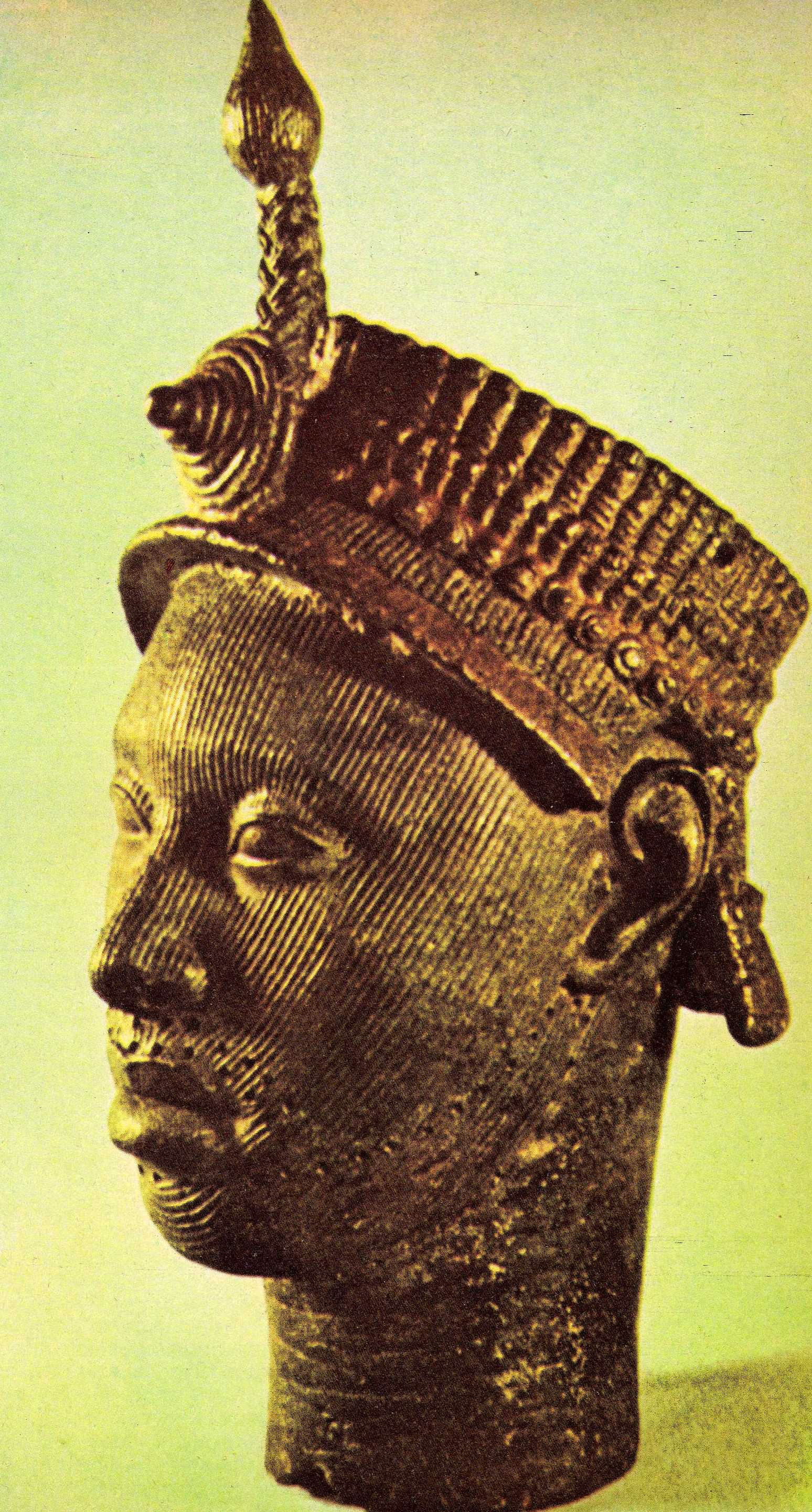
- Ife Head, relic of the royal cult of an ancient Ooni of Ile-Ife and heraldic symbol of Ife royalty
- Parent house: Oke Ora (Historically); Olodumare (God) (Philosophically)
- Current region: Yorubaland
- Founded: c.10th century
- Founder: Oduduwa (Olofin Adimula)
- Current head: Ojaja II
- Titles: Ọba, Ọọni Ifẹ; Ọba, Olofin Adimula Ife; Ojoye/Oloye Ife: ÌHÀRẸ – Outer/Town chiefs (Àgbà Ifẹ̀): Ọbalufe (Ọ̀runtọ́) Ife; Ọbalọran Ife; Ọbajio Ife; Ọbalaye Ife; Akọgun Ife; Waasin ife; Jagunọṣin ife; Ejesi Ife; MỌDÉWÁ – Inner/Palace chiefs (Ẹmẹsẹ̀): Lọwa ijaruwa; Isanire; Jaran; Aguro; Arodẹ; Ladin; Lọwate; Erebẹsẹ; Ọmọba Ife; Yeyeluwa Ife; Oloori Ife
- Styles: Kábíèsí; Majesty; Imperial Highness
- Members: Olubuse II; Adesoji Aderemi; Tejumade Alakija
- Connected families: Oyo royal family Bini royal family
- Traditions: Ìṣẹ̀ṣe; Christianity; Islam
- Motto: Ilé Ifẹ̀ orírun ayé, Ibi tí ojúmọ́ ti ń mọ́ wá. (Yoruba: Ife, source origin of the world, the place from which dawn begins)
- Cadet branches: In Ife (4): Oshinkola of Iremo; Giesi of Moore; Ogboru of Ilare; Lafogido of Okerewe; Outside Ife (Several): Oyo royal family; Bini royal family; Ketu royal family; Various royal families across Yorubaland.

Ife tradition, which modern historians accord precedence, relates that Oduduwa was a personage who migrated from the community of Oke Ora, a hilltop abode to the east of the original Ife confederacy of thirteen communities known as the Elu. The leadership of these communities structured themselves to be rotational, with the Oba of each community taking turns at chairmanship. The communities are remembered to be; Iloromu, Imojubi, Ideta (Idita), Oke-Oja, Parakin, Ido, Iwinrin, Odin, Ijugbe, Iraye, Oke-Awo, Iloran and Omologun.

=== Early life ===
Oduduwa and his group are believed to have disrupted the political structure of the 13 communities being led by Obatala, a conflict said to be responsible for some early migrations from Ife. Between war and diplomacy lasting several generations, the groups were at a stalemate, until a large smallpox outbreak brought about a truce from the Obatala camp, eventually forming these communities into a single Ife state under the Oduduwa group. The reconciliation and reintegration of the Obatala group into the political and civil structure of Ife is commemorated annually in the Itapa festival.

There were elements of the Ugbo, members of the former Obatala faction, who strongly opposed the new alliance. Some, seeking more fertile land, are said to have left Ife of their own accord to resettle and form their own Yoruba communities near the coast, while others relocated elsewhere in Ife to continue the conflict.

=== Crowns of Oduduwa ===
Long after the era of Oduduwa and Obatala, the next major progression of events were captured in the figure of Ọranyan (Ọ̀rànmíyàn). In tradition, Oranyan was a son of Ogun, and the youngest of Oduduwa's grandsons. He is said to have been the most war-like Yoruba prince out of all his contemporaries, and certainly one of the most adventurous of the historical princes. Ife was under constant raids by disassociated factions of the previous Ugbo groups, but upon learning their secrets from Mọremí, Oranyan is said to have brought an end to their brigandry, and along with Moremi, brought a long period of peace to Ife.

Ife enjoyed remarkable royal and technological developments throughout its classical period. It became the largest emporium for religious, economic, and political advancement in the region, and attracted traders from all over West Africa who sought its exclusive offerings. As Ife's renown increased, the eminence of the Oduduwa dynasty grew to the extent that the possession of a "crown of Oduduwa" projected the ability to guarantee security through cultural, military, and political power for migrating groups.

Oranyan spread the consolidated model of Ife kingship to many parts of the Yoruba world through his own offspring, notably establishing the two most prominent regional dynasties after Ife in the Oyo Empire, and the Benin kingdom. Some traditions from Ado Ekiti and other Yoruba kingdoms also associate part of their royal Ife origins with figures who accompanied Oranyan's initial entourage out of Ife. Oranyan later returned home, to claim Ife's crown of Oduduwa.

=== Omo Oduduwa ===
Various traditions say that up to 16 different princes or groups left Ife (Oranyan being the last) to create kingdoms that would constitute a familial commonwealth with Ife as their sacred fatherly centre. The founders of these various royal lineages are commonly translated from Yoruba traditions to English as sons or grandsons of Oduduwa. Historians and anthropologists generally see these traditions as the compressed selections of Yoruba descendants who were remembered for their impact, rather than as a literal and complete family tree. Till today Yoruba people call themselves Ọmọ Odùduwà (descendants of Oduduwa) after the same manner.

== Alternative views ==
=== Oduduwa and his/her role in creation ===
Yoruba religious traditions about the dawn of time claim that Oduduwa was Olodumare's favorite Orisa. As such, he (or she, as the primordial Oduduwa originally represented the Divine Feminine aspect and Obatala the Divine Masculine) was sent from heaven to create the earth upon the waters, a mission he/she had usurped from his/her consort and sibling Obatala, who had been equipped with a snail shell filled with sand and a rooster to scatter the said sand in order to create land. These beliefs, held by Yoruba traditionalists, are said to be the cornerstone of their story of creation. Obatala and Oduduwa here are represented symbolically by a calabash, with Obatala taking the top and Oduduwa taking the bottom. In this narrative, Oduduwa is also known as Olofin Otete, the one who took the Basket of Existence from Olodumare.

Another depiction of Oduduwa as being the wife of Obatala is presented in Osa Meji, a verse of the Odu Ifa. In this Odu, Obatala discovers the secret of his wife and steals the masquerade's robes from her to wear it himself. This is suggested to be a historical representation of a switch from matriarchy to patriarchy.

This cosmological tradition has sometimes been blended with the tradition of the historical Oduduwa. According to others, the historical Oduduwa is considered to be named after the earlier version of Oduduwa, who is female and related to the Earth called Ile.

The earlier traditions of either a gender-fluid or an expressly female Oduduwa are seen in the spirit's representation in the Gelede tradition. Initiates of Gelede receive a shrine to Oduduwa along with a Gelede costume and mask. This speaks to Oduduwa as being associated with the divine ancestral mothers that are known as Awon iya wa or Iyami. Here, Oduduwa is revered as the mother of the Yoruba.

=== Non-Yoruba views ===
Certain other people have claimed a connection to Oduduwa. According to the Kanuri, Yauri, Gobir, Acipu, Jukun and Borgu tribes, whose founding ancestors were said to be Oduduwa's brothers (as recorded in the 19th century by Samuel Johnson), Oduduwa was the son of Damerudu, whom Yoruba call Lamurudu, a prince who was himself the son of the magician King Kisra. Kisra and his allies are said to have fought Prophet Muhammad in the Battle of Badr and Kisra was forced to migrate from Arabia into Africa after losing the war to the jihadists in 624 AD. According to the legend, he and his followers founded many kingdoms and ruling dynasties along their migration route into West Africa. This tradition is a variant of the belief, popular amongst some Muslims, that held that Oduduwa was a prince originating from Mecca. However, it is thought by some scholars to derive from the later influences on Yoruba culture of Islam and other Abrahamic religions and conflicts with other traditions in the Yoruba traditional corpus.

== See also ==
- Candomble religion
- List of rulers of Ife
- Santeria religion
- Yoruba religion

== Sources ==
- Ogundiran, Akinwumi (2020). The Yoruba: A New History. Indiana University Press. ISBN 9780253051509.
- Shillington, Kevin (4 July 2013). Encyclopedia of African History 3-Volume Set. Taylor & Francis. ISBN 978-1-135-45670-2.
- Law, R. C. C. (1973). "The Heritage of Oduduwa: Traditional History and Political Propaganda among the Yoruba". The Journal of African History. 14 (2): 207–222. doi:10.1017/S0021853700012524. ISSN 0021-8537. JSTOR 180445. S2CID 148987750.
- Bondarenko, Dmitri (2003). "Advent of the Second (Oba) Dynasty: Another Assessment of a Benin History Key Point". History in Africa. 30: 63–85. doi:10.1017/S0361541300003144. JSTOR 3172082.
- Peter M. Rose, Dmitri M. Bondarenko (2004). "Between the Ogiso and Oba Dynasties: An Interpretation of Interregnum in the Benin Kingdom". History in Africa. 31: 103–115. doi:10.1017/S0361541300003417. JSTOR 4128520.
- Wyndham, John (1921). Myths of Ífè. E. Macdonald. ISBN 9781465517128.
- Adebayo, Akanmu (6 February 2018). Culture, Politics, and Money Among the Yoruba. Routledge. ISBN 978-1-351-52419-3.
- Johnson, Samuel (1921). The history of the Yorubas : From the Earliest Times to the Beginning of the British Protectorate.
