= Alakija =

- Gender: Male
- Language: Yoruba

Origin
- Origin: Nigeria
- Meaning: Title of the ruler of Ìkijà..
- Region of origin: South West, Nigeria

Alakija is a surname of Yoruba origin.It means "Title of the ruler of Ìkijà".Notable people with the surname include:

- Adeyemo Alakija (1884–1952), Nigerian lawyer, politician and businessman
- Aduke Alakija (1921–2016), Nigerian lawyer and diplomat
- Tejumade Alakija (1925–2013), Nigeria civil servant and educator
- Danielle Alakija (born 1996), Fijian athlete
- Folorunsho Alakija (born 1951), Nigerian businesswoman
- Rotimi Alakija, British DJ
