= Tunde Odunlade =

Nigerian batik tapestry and floatography artist (born 1954)

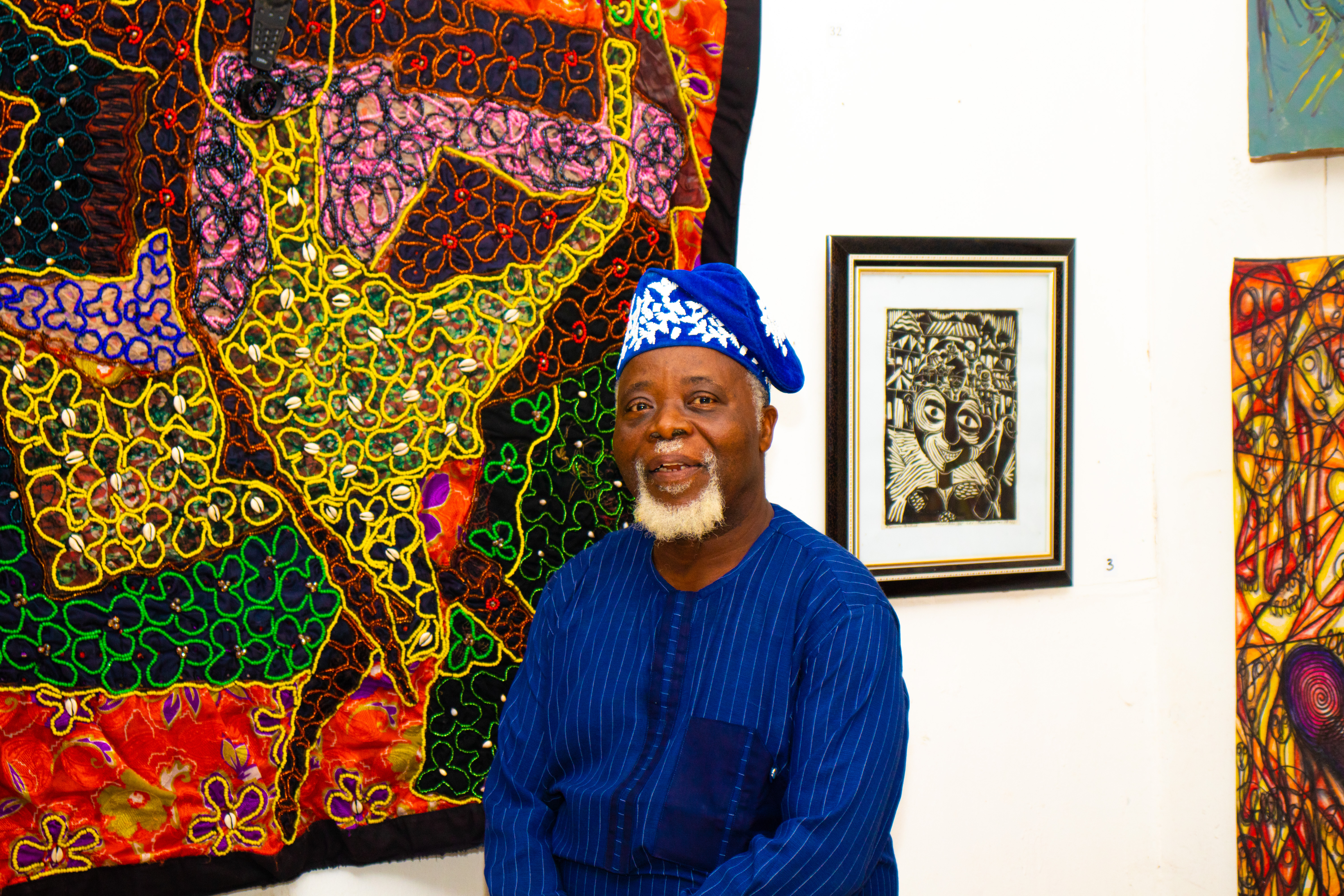
- Tunde Odunlade in his Tunde Odunlade Arts and Culture Connexions gallery at Ibadan
- Born: 26 November 1954 (age 71)
- Known for: Batik Tapestry, Floatograph
- Movement: Osogbo

Tunde Odunlade (Túndé Ọdúnladé in Yoruba), born 26 November 1954, is a Nigerian artist, actor, and musician known for his Batik art tapestry and designs. He specialises in textile arts, and floatography. He is a member of the Visual Artists Network of the United States of America (VAN) and a frequent participant at the National Conference of Artists, New York. He was a performing actor with the Nigeria Cultural Troupe during Festac. He lives in Ibadan, the southern western part of Nigeria.

== Early life and career ==
Babatunde Samuel Odunlade was born on 26 November 1954 in Iremo, Ile-Ife, where he spent his childhood. He met Yinka Adeyemi, a member of the Osogbo school of arts, and began his career in early 1970 as a second generation artist of the school of art. He also attended the Oguntimehin Art-workshop at the University of Ife in 1973. Tunde uses traditional techniques through a unique batik appliqué process on textiles. He also developed a style which he calls floatograph, his art draws from Yoruba history, culture and life in Nigeria with speciality in batiks, linocut, and woodcut prints. He was an artist-in-residence in 1986 and 1989 at Stillman College, Tuscaloosa, Alabama.

He served as artistic director at the Toki Memorial Arts Centre, Ibadan in 1989, He also founded International Campaign for Better Arts and Cultural Awareness (ICBACA).

In December 2020, he established the Tunde Odunlade Arts and Culture Connexions in Ibadan, Oyo State.

== Exhibitions ==
His works has been exhibited within Nigeria and internationally, including:

- Federal Government College Sokoto, 1978, 1980, 1981.
- Bakolori Dam Project, Talata, Mafara, Sokoto, 1978.
- Education Center, Ministry of Education, Maiduguri. 1981 – 1982.
- 27 January – 20 March 1999 "New Colours from Old Worlds: Contemporary Art from West Africa" October Gallery, London
- 24 March – 8 May 1999. "Beauty Ravishes Me All Over Wherever I Find It." October Gallery, London
- Feb – April 2010. "Dreaming Between Worlds." Hammonds House Museum Atlanta, GA.
- October 2011. "Art as a Tool for Nation Building." Nigerian High Commission, Ottawa, Canada
- July – August 2011. "New York Summer Show 2011". Corrine Jennings Gallery, New York, NY
- December 2012. Lagos Art Expo. National Museum, Lagos, Nigeria.
- February to April 2012. City Lights Gallery, Bridgeport, Connecticut.
