= Seventh Day Adventist Grammar School, Ile-Ife =

Secondary school in Nigeria

Seventh Day Adventist Grammar School, ILE-IFE, is a secondary school in Ile-Ife.

Mission president Joseph Adeyemo Adeogun, who was the first indigenous minister to assume the mantle of leadership, was instrumental in the founding of the secondary school, the Adventist Grammar School in Ile-Ife in 1960.
