= Moremi Statue of Liberty =

Statue located in Ile-Ife, Nigeria

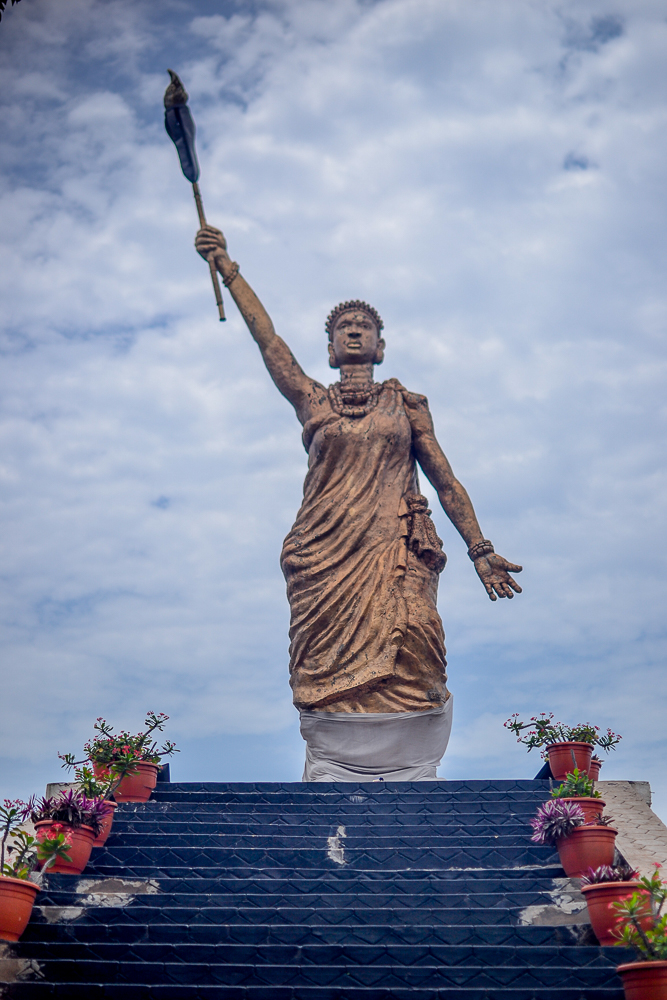
- Interactive map of Moremi Statue of Liberty
- Location: Ile-Ife, Osun, Nigeria
- Designer: Victor Badejo
- Type: Statue
- Height: 12.8 m (42 ft)
- Opening date: 22 November 2016; 9 years ago
- Dedicated to: Moremi Ajasoro

The Moremi Statue of Liberty is a 12.8-metre (42 ft) tall statue located within the palace compound of the Ooni of Ife in Ile-Ife, Nigeria. It was built in honour of the legendary Yoruba queen Moremi Ajasoro. Situated in the place where she once lived, it was built by a team of about 200 Nigerian youths and artisans led by the sculptor in charge of the Ooni Palace Art Gallery, Victor Badejo and the palace engineer, Simeon Adeyinka after being envisioned by the Ooni Adeyeye Enitan Ogunwusi.

The statue was unveiled in November 2016 by the Ooni and is now a tourist attraction. It is the tallest statue in Nigeria and the fourth tallest in Africa.

== See also ==
- Moremi Ajasoro
- Ọranmiyan
- Amazon Monument
- List of tallest statues
