= Oke Ora =

Archaeological site in Osun State, Nigeria

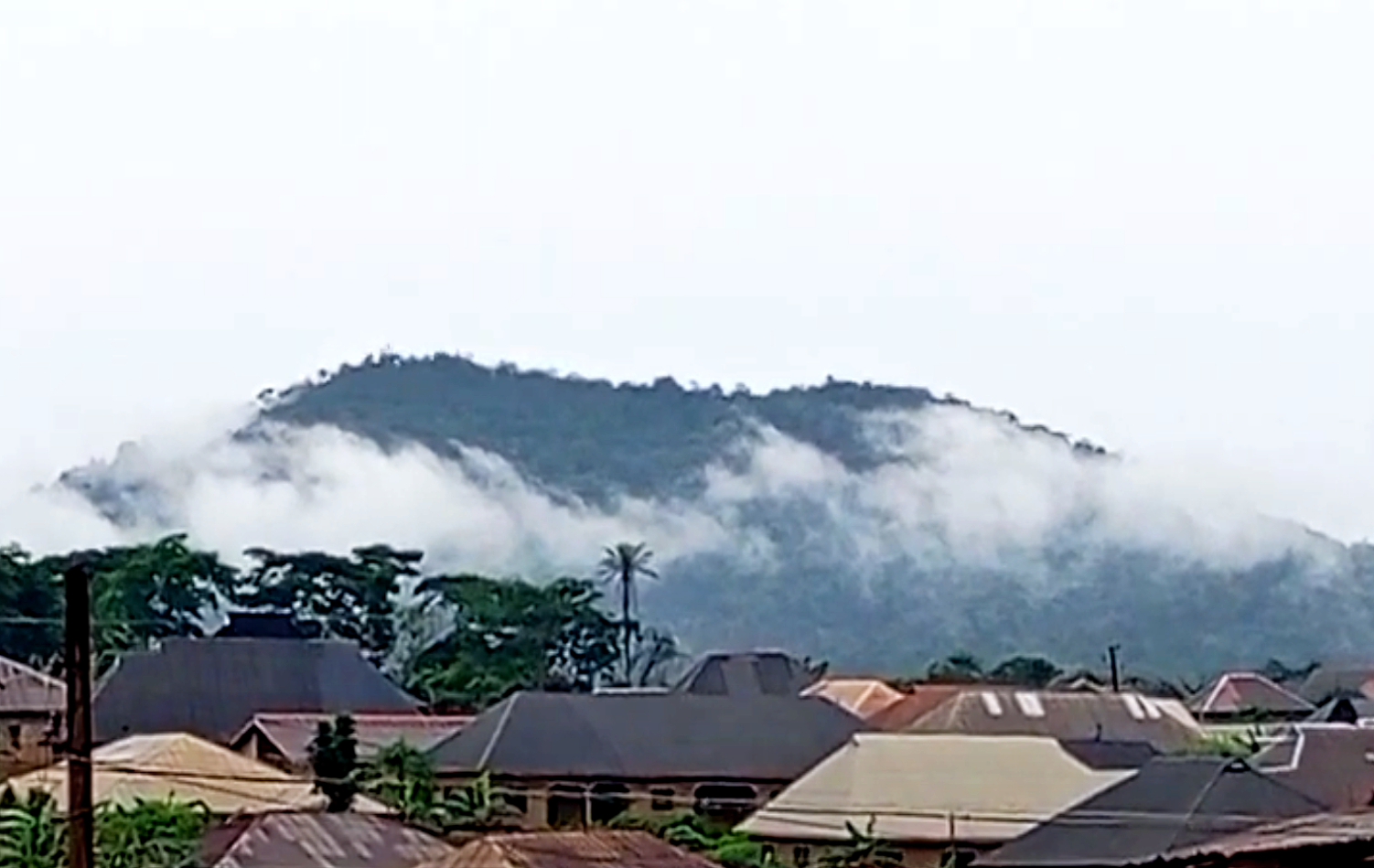
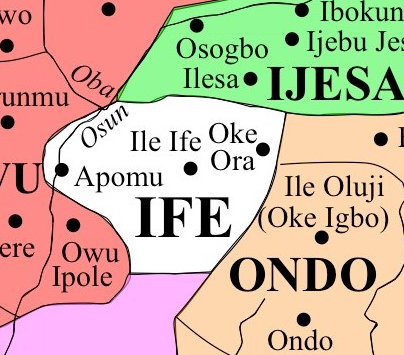
- The 650m Ora Hill (Oke Ora) as seen from Ife looking due East. Oke Ọra community east of Ile-Ifẹ, within the Ifẹ Kingdom, c. 1780

- Location within Nigeria
- 7°30′28″N 4°37′36″E
- Cultures: Early Yorubaland
- Associated with: Oranfe, Oduduwa
- Location: Ilode II, Ife East Local Government Area, Nigeria
- Region: Nigeria; Osun State

History
- Built: Late Stone Age
- Abandoned: 900CE (?)

Site notes
- Elevation: 650 m (2,130 ft)
- Excavation dates: 1977
- Archaeologists: Omotoso Eluyemi
- Condition: Abandoned. (A small hamlet at the foot of the hill continues to bear the name)
- Early Yoruba community, The origin of Oduduwa and Oranfe

Oke Ora (Yoruba: Òkè Ọ̀rà) is an ancient community and archaeological site situated on a hill about 8 km (5 mi) east of Ifẹ̀ (Ilé-Ifẹ̀), in between the city and the small village of Itagunmodi. Two important characters in the early history of Yorubaland; Oramfe and Oduduwa came from Oke Ora. Several stories and legends of the Yoruba people surround the site. In the Yoruba creation legend, it was the first mound of earth formed from the soil in a snail shell and from which Ife, the first settlement was built. Today, it continues to play an important role in certain religious rites of the Ife people, most significantly, in the coronation rituals of the Ọọni (Ọwọni CY, Ọghọnẹ SEY), Ọba of Ifẹ̀.

== Name ==
The name Oke Ora owes its etymology to two separate words; Òkè and Ọ̀ra. In the Yoruba language, Òkè means a mountain or hill, while Ọ̀ra is a deity, who is one of the highest ranking in Ife, and said to be an avatar of Orishala. He is the central Yorubaland deity of thunder, storms, lightening and fire who empowers rulers and promotes the well being of kingdoms through fertility and increase.

== Site ==
Oke Ora is the most important landmark in a chain of seven hills surrounding the sites of the ancient Ife confederation. This confederation of Thirteen clans/provinces, (Yoruba: Ẹ̀lú Mẹ́tàlá) was set in the central plain, fringed by the hills like the middle of a bowl stretching some 20 km across. Because of the water streams flowing downhill into the center of the bowl which was at a lower altitude of around 275m, the middle of the Ife bowl was seasonally flooded and swampy. The six other hills are; Oke-Obagbile, Oke-Ipao, Oke-Ijugbe, Oke-Onigbin, Oke-Araromi and Oke-Owu.

Archaeological work in the area has produced several artefacts in rock shelters on these hills, such as; hand tools i.e. axes, broken pottery fragments, charcoal, stone sculptures, ancient road pavements and clay figurines. Some of the pots have holes in their rims for ropes to hang them from palm trees in the collection of palm wine. All being evidence of early human habitation by the ancestors of the modern people of Ife and its immediate environs.

Close by Oke Ora was Igbo Ore, a site which is associated with a character in early Ife known by the name Oreluere. The grove has also yielded several artefacts such as the Idena and Olofenfura (Olofinfura) human stone sculptures. These sculptures have been estimated to date to the period in between the 8th and 10th centuries CE. British Archaeologist, Paul Ozanne stated in his 1969 preliminary survey of the Ife area that; "Many settlements were already established on ground in the Ife country by at least the 4th century BC (350BCE) in the latest." The gradual establishment and peopling of the area that became Ife dates back to around the year (900BC).

== History ==
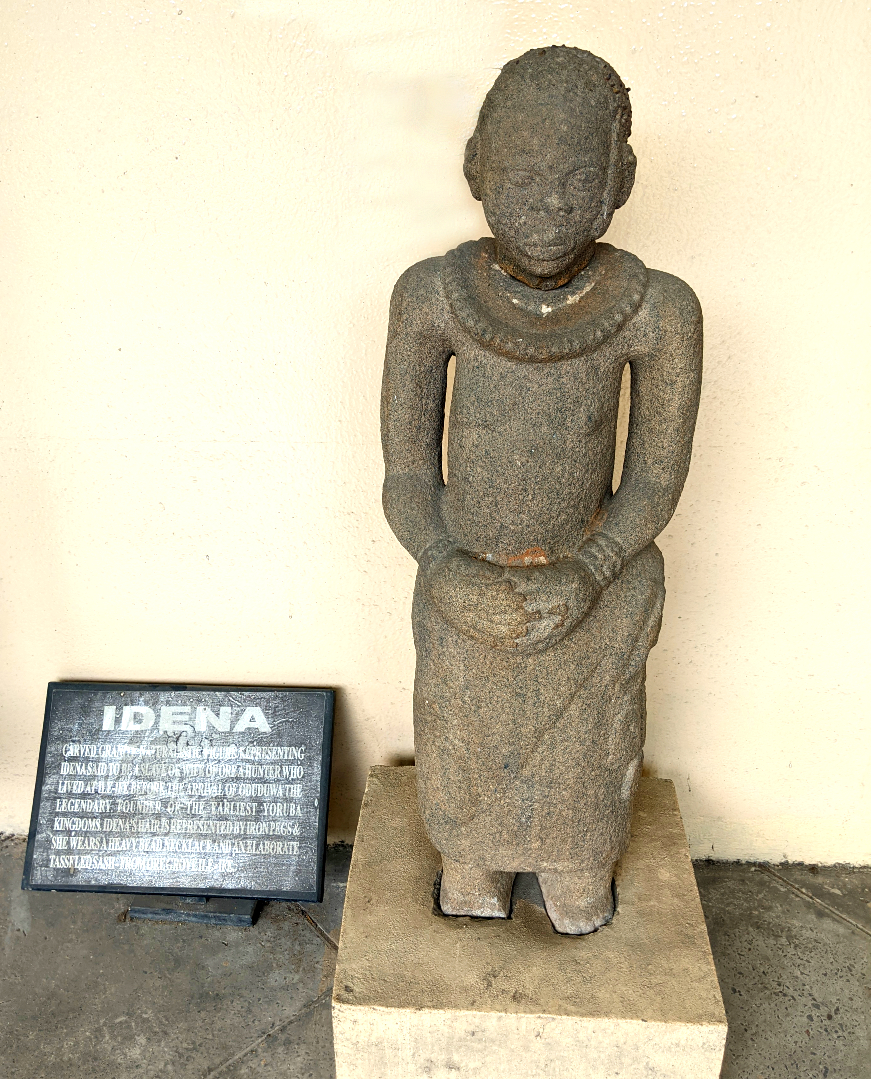
Replica granite figure of Idena, the gatekeeper of the Ore grove in Ife. Original dated to the 9th-14th century AD.

The history of Oke Ora is directly related to the history of early communities of Ife, and by extension the entirety of Yorubaland - the vast majority of which directly relate to Ife through dynastic migrations of people, royals and ideas by way of innovation and technology.

According to Ife accounts, it was from the settlement atop this hill that Oduduwa and his followers descended into the midst of an ongoing political imbroglio that had engulfed the thirteen confederal communities (Ẹ̀lú Mẹ́tàlá) in the Ife valley/bowl headed at the time by Obatala. On ground in the Ife area, he met Sixteen extant elders known as the Ooye Merindinlogun which included; Agboniregun (Orunmila), Oluorogbo, Oreluere, Elesije, Obameri, Esidale, Obagede, Obasin, Obalejugbe, Ojumu of Iloran and others. The incoming Oduduwa group did not belong to the confederal arrangement in the valley, and were originally seen as outsiders (new comers). This was the source of purport for the traditional account that Oduduwa was a "stranger from the east".

The Oduduwa led group then took advantage of the ongoing disharmonious political situation to enter the political fray that dominated the affairs of the Ife valley at the time.

The thirteen communities/provinces/clans (Elu) that formed the Ife federation were:

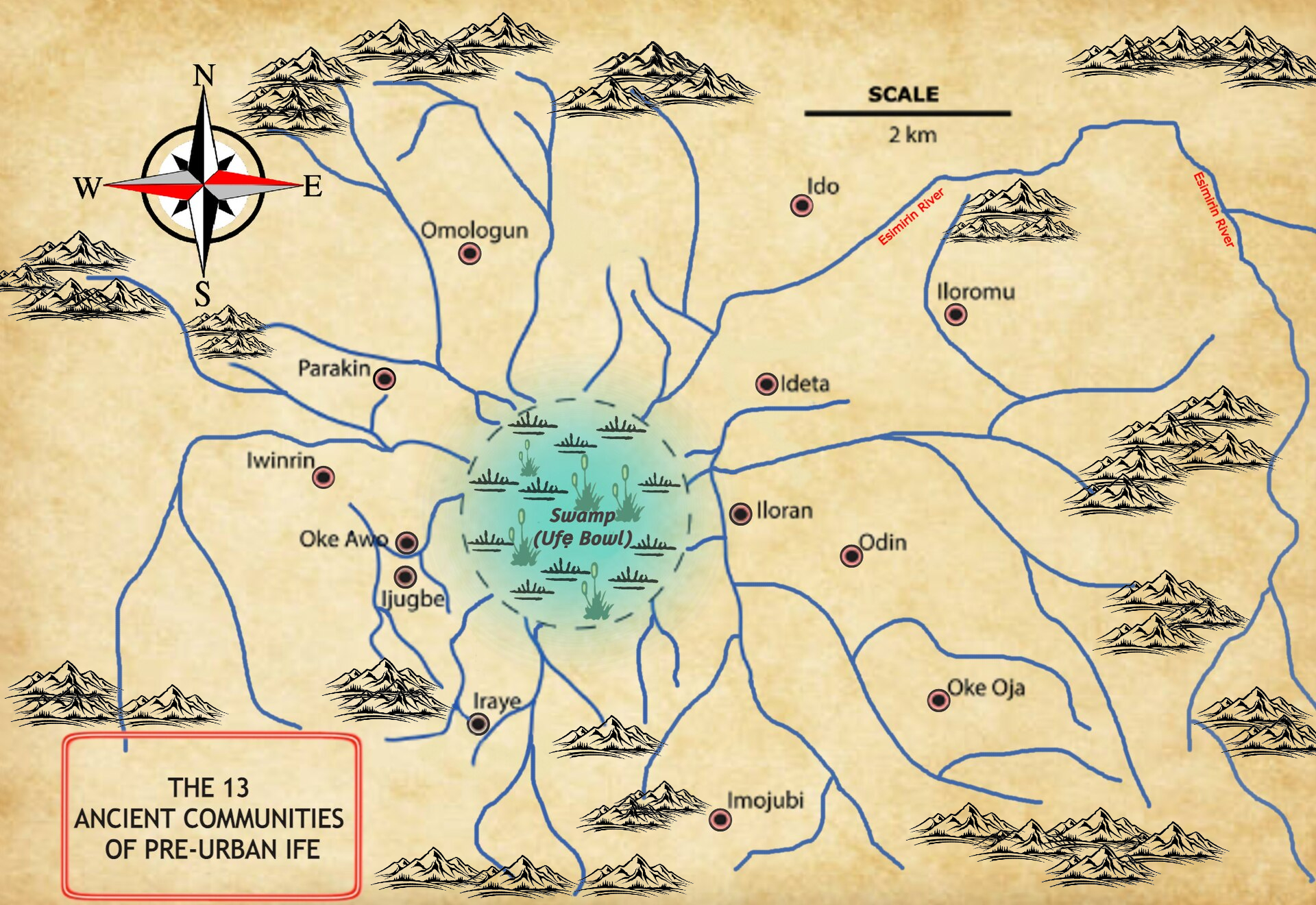
Map showing the relative positions of the Thirteen ancient communities or clans present in the area of ancient Ife pre unification.

- Iloromu
- Imojubi
- Ideta (Idita)
- Oke-Oja
- Parakin
- Ido
- Iwinrin
- Odin
- Ijugbe
- Iraye
- Oke-Awo
- Iloran
- Omologun

Out of their number, Ideta was the largest. In addition to these, certain community names for various reasons (such as time of establishment) often come up in other sources as a part of the original thirteen clan confederacy, and sometimes not. These include; Ita Yemoo (Yemowo), Orun Oba Ado, Ilara, Igbo Olokun and Idio. Each village complex was further composed of its own sub-village (hamlet) groups. Ijugbe consisted of four villages, namely: Eranyigba, Igbogbe, Ipa and Ita Asin, while the Ideta complex had three: Ilesun (Ulesun), Ilale (Ulale) and Ilia (Ulia) villages, headed by the, Obalesun, Obalale and Obalia respectively, local hamlet heads who were subservient to Obatala, lord of Ideta. All thirteen clans/provinces had their Obas, who were all said to report to the Obalejugbe, lord of Ijugbe. The Ile-Ife confederacy was a loose political association with no centralized government, powerful Oba or seat of permanent power.

Over time, leaders of the original clans and their people pitched their support with either of the rival sides. There grew an armed confrontation between the two factions that had developed in the Ife valley (The Obatala group and the Oduduwa group), which resulted in a devastating civil war. Pitching their tents in the Obatala camp were; Obamakin, Obawinrin of Iwinrin, Oluorogbo, and the two great warriors; Oshateko and Oshakire. While in the Oduduwa camp were; Obameri of Odin (His war captain), Obadio, Apata of Imojubi, Obalora and others.

== Emergence of the Ugbo ==
The civil war that engulfed ancient Ife forced Obatala and Obawinrin to abandon the Ideta and Iwinrin settlements respectively and flee across the Esimirin river to establish a new settlement with their people. The new settlement was called Ideta oko (I.e The Ideta camp as opposed to the actual Ideta ile or 'home Ideta'). After a time period when the situation had simmered down, a peace agreement was brokered between the victorious Oduduwa party and the Obatala faction by Ojumu of Iloran, one of the Ooye Merindinlogun elders. The agreement allowed for the return of Obatala and Obawinrin and their people to the ruins of Ideta and Iwinrin under the new leadership of Oduduwa in the newly unified settlement of “Ile-Ife” where Ooduwa was now in full control. Oduduwa became the first Ọba of a unified Ife. The era of the 13 semi autonomous clans (Elu) was gone for good.

However, not all members of the Obatala faction were pleased with the new terms of agreement/settlement. The dissatisfied minority led by Obawinrin vowed never to return, stayed out of the city and migrated further away from Ideta Oko to a place called Igbo Ugbo. They launched clandestine bouts of guerrilla attacks, arson, stealing, terror, kidnapping, farm attacks and other vices on Ife from there up until the Moremi Ajasoro saga which put an end to the attacks from the Ugbo for good. Obatala himself is known as Oba Ugbo (King of the Igbo) - While the Igbo people are also known as the Eluyare or Igare.

== Significance of Oke Ora ==
The legendary descent of Oduduwa from Oke Ora is apotheosized in Yoruba religious/philosophical circles as a literal 'descent' from the heavens/abode of the Orisha. The ritual significance of Oduduwa's descent from Oke Ora is usually demonstrated in the coronation rituals of every new Ooni Ife which involves seven kingmakers who play different functions. On the morning of the coronation day, after spending twenty one days at Ilofin (seclusion) where his head is shaved, the king-in-making proceeds to Ife's eastern gate called Lekun Ode.

This procession mirrors the path and direction that Oduduwa took into the Iloromu clan (now in Moore quarters) of Ife from his eastern home of Oke Ora. There, he meeds the Walode of Ife, high priest of Olokun and patron chief of the bead makers and glass workers of Ife who traditionally made the Oba's crown. He then proceeds to visit the site of the Oduduwa temple and Oke Ora, home of his ancestor with members of the Isoro chiefly class, where he has a symbolic crown made for him by the Odofin of Ido. The Ife royal/state sword, 'Ada Ogun' (patron deity of the royal family) is also brought over to Ido and handed to the Ooni by the Owa Eredunmi, chief priest of Oranmiyan in a process known as Igbada or 'sword Investiture'. This is followed by crossing the eastern gate on the left side towards Iwesu. He is then proclaimed Ooni.

After the proclamation, his name is eventually announced at Enugeru. The palace and town officials then pay homage to the new king in the Obalufe's courtyard.

== Ife post unification ==
After the unification of Ife, the city developed based on six major historic quarters (Ọ̀gbọ́n) overseen by the major chiefs of the Ihare class (town chiefs) who were originally six in number and led by the Obalufe who was comparable to a traditional prime minister of sort. Power became centralized under a ruler and the previously semi-autonomous clans/communities in Ife merged into a single urban entity. Even though the titles of some of the previous clan leaders and community heads continued to carry the prefix -Oba, they had lost their political and economic power to the authority of the Ooni.

The six new quarters of Ife were:

| Wards | Chiefs |
|---|---|
| Iremo (Remo) | Obalufe (Ọruntọ) Leader |
| Imoore (Moore) | Oba Ejio |
| Ilode | Obaloran & Ejesi |
| Ilare | Waasin |
| Iraye | Obalaaye |
| Okerewe/Ikogun | Akogun |

== See also ==
- Ife Empire
- Oduduwa
- Obatala
- Ile Ife
- Primacy of ife
