= Ifẹ =

City in Osun State, Nigeria

Ilé-Ifẹ̀ Ifẹ̀ Oòyè
- City
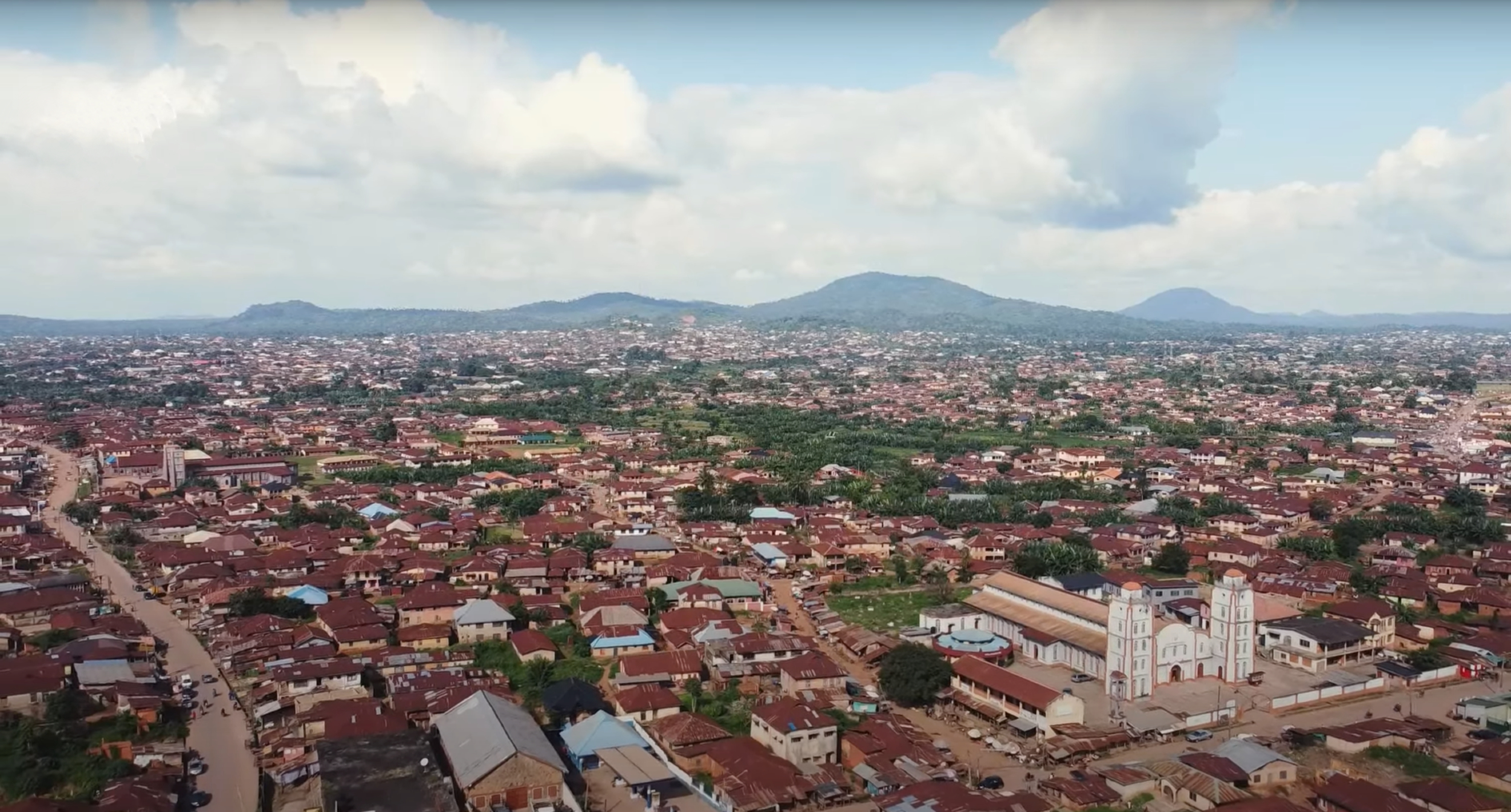
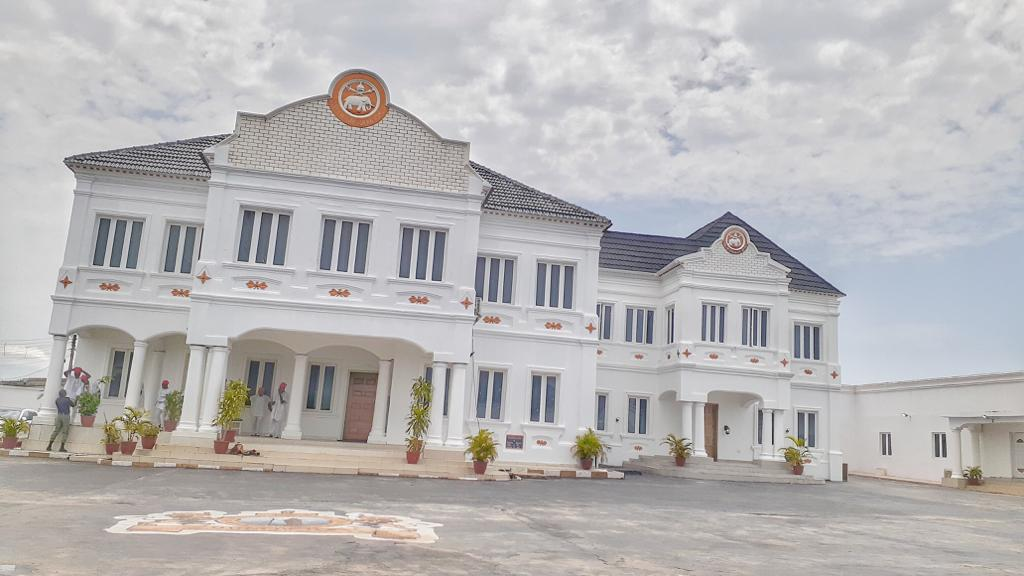
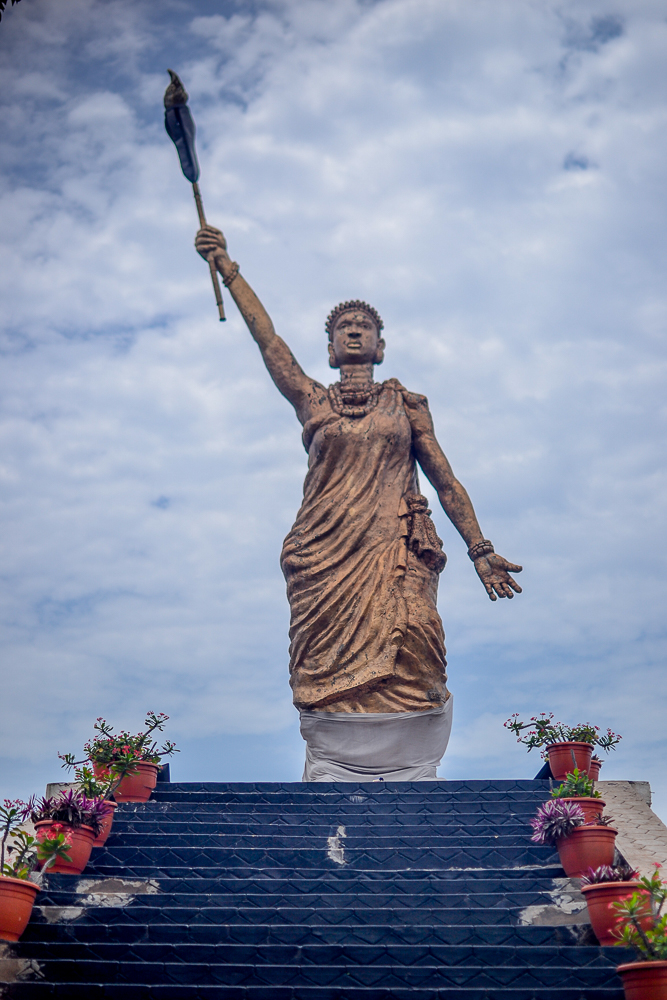
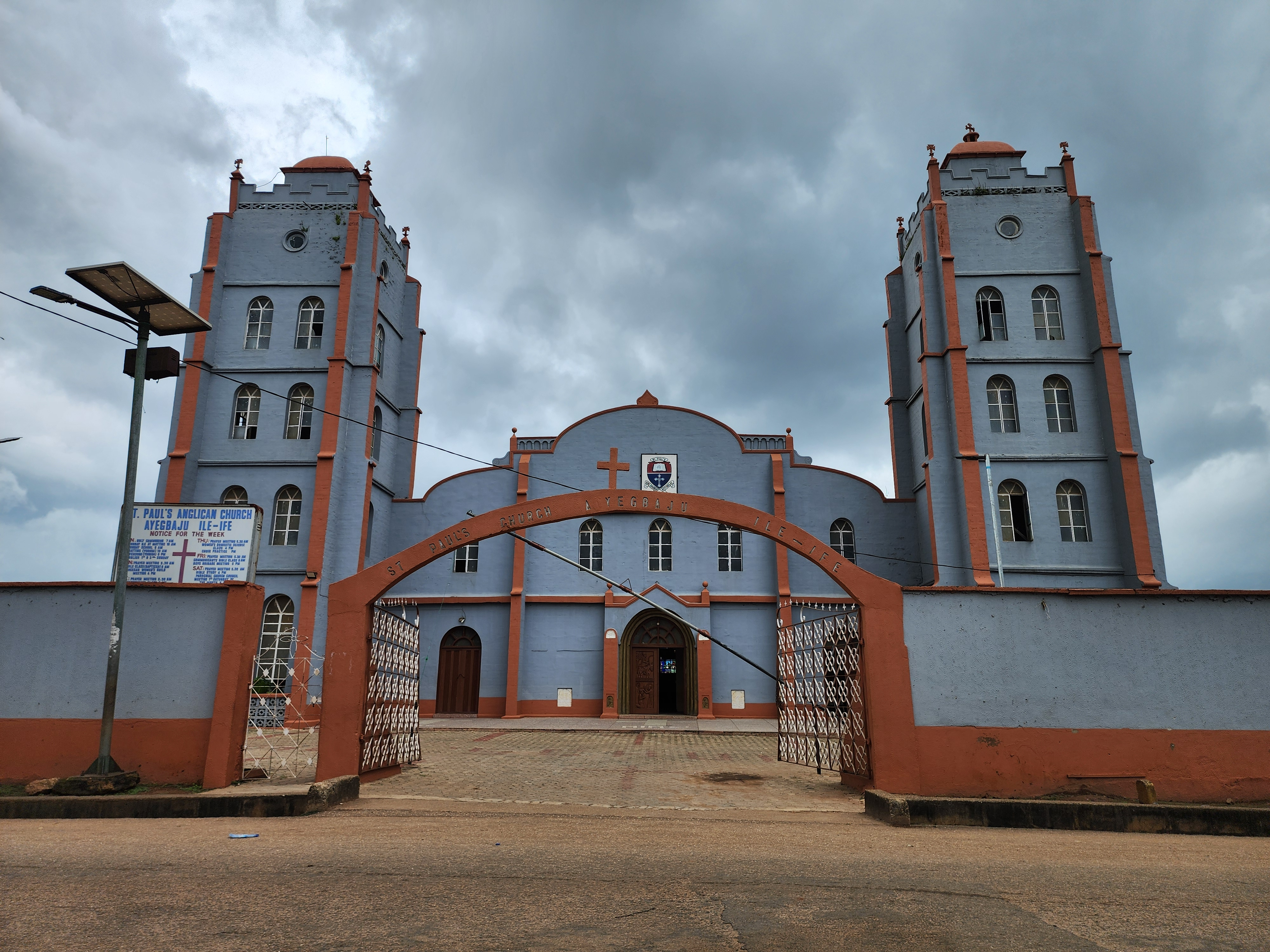
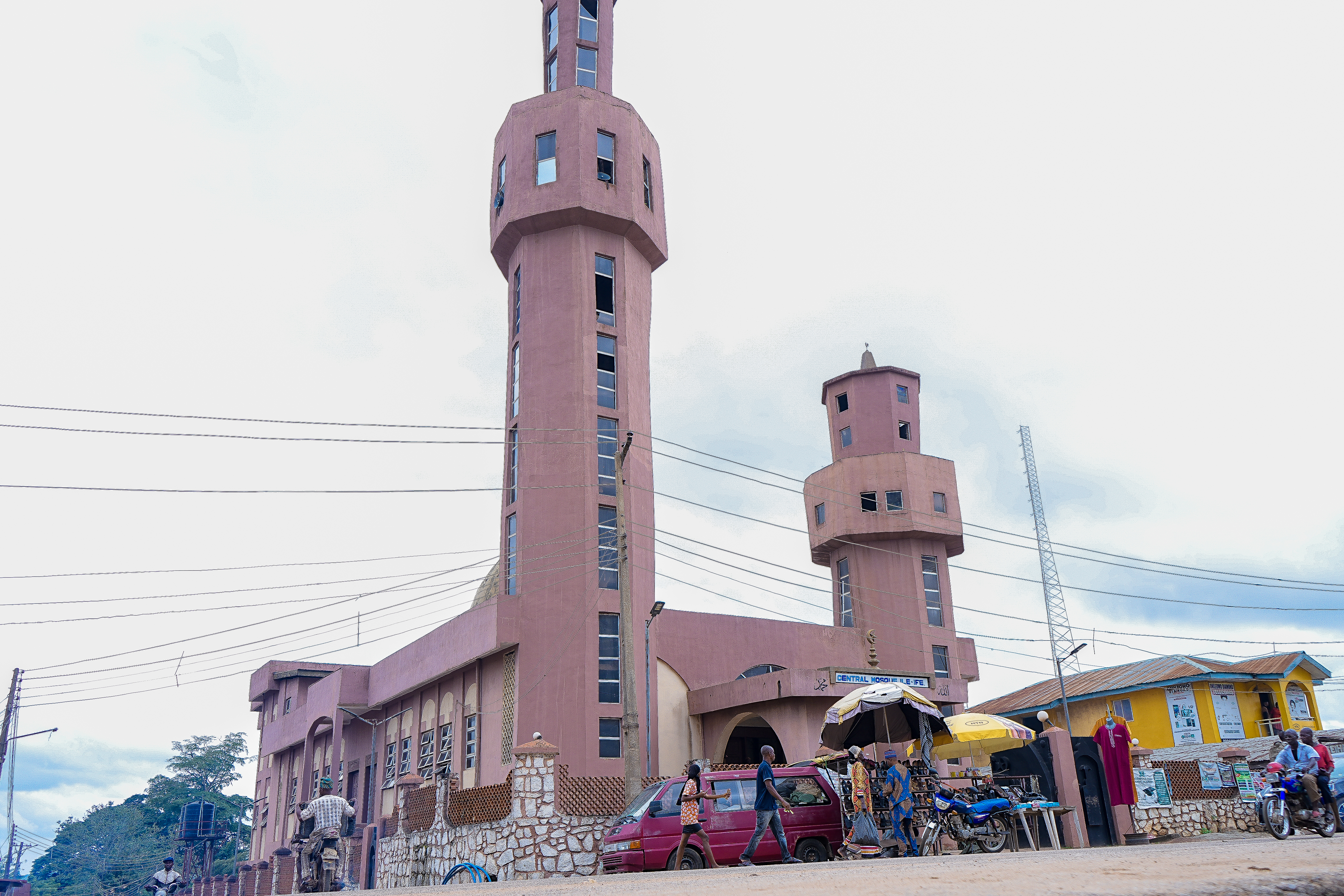
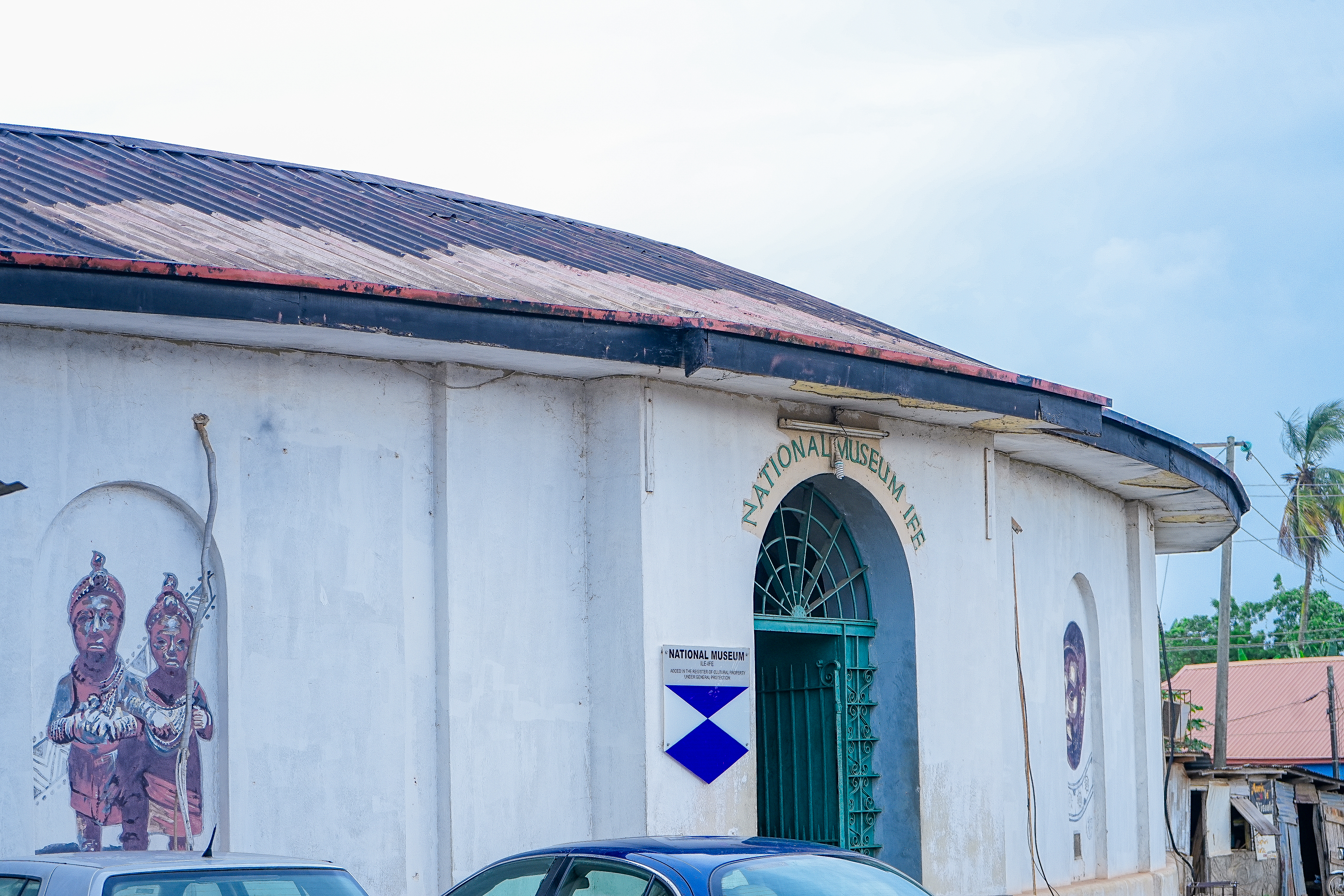
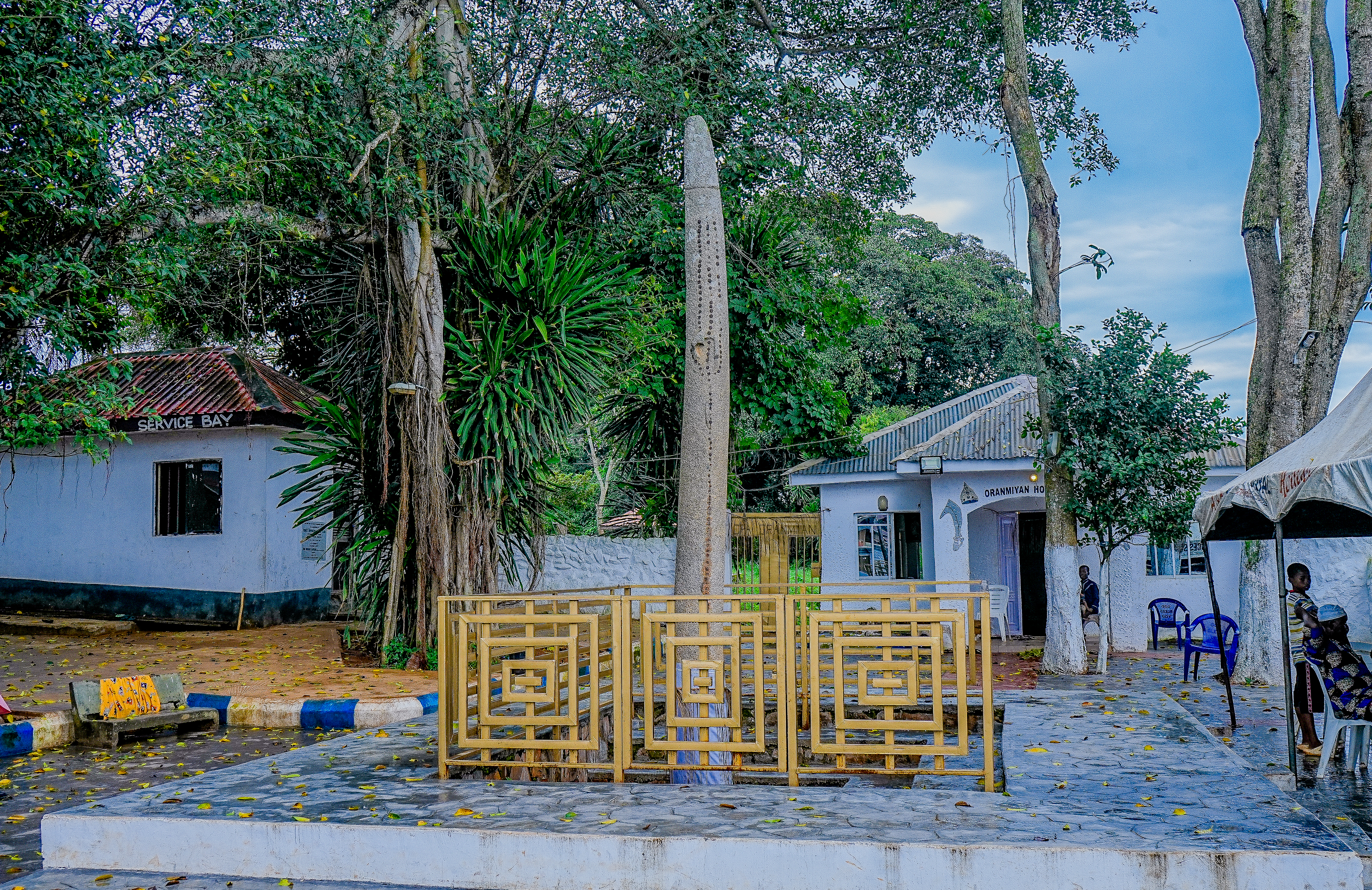
- Bird's eye view of the City Ooni's Palace Moremi Statue of Liberty St.Paul's Anglican Church Ife Central Mosque Ife National Museum Opa Oranmiyan

- Location within Nigeria
- Coordinates: 7°29′00″N 4°33′33″E
- Country: Nigeria
- State: Osun
- LGAs: Ife Central; Ife East; Ife North; Ife South
- Founded: c. ~ 1000 BC — 500 BC

Government
  - Ọọni: Ojaja II
  - LGA Chairman, Ife Central: Adeyenuwo Rotimi John
  - LGA Chairman, Ife North: Akande Micheal Oluwole
  - LGA Chairman, Ife South: Aroke Muyiwa Aderemi
  - LGA Chairman, Ife East: Odunyemi Haruna Bukola

Area
  - City: 1,791 km^{2} (692 sq mi)

Population (2006)
  - City: 509,035
  - Density: 284.2/km^{2} (736.1/sq mi)
  - Metro: Ife North – 153,694; Ife Central – 167,254; Ife East – 188,087; Ife South – 135,338
- National language: Yorùbá
- Climate: Aw

Ifẹ̀
Total population
- ~ 835,600 (2022)

Regions with significant populations
- Ife Central: 217,100
- Ife East: 244,900
- Ife South: 174,600
- Ife North: 199,000

Ifẹ̀ (Yoruba: Ifẹ̀, also called Ilé-Ifẹ̀) is an ancient Yoruba city in south-western Nigeria founded sometime between the years 1000 BC and 500 BC. By 900 AD, the city had become an important West African emporium producing sophisticated art forms, and by the 1100s, it had entered a florescent classical period, becoming the capital of a significant regional empire.

The city is located in present-day Osun State. Ifẹ̀ is about 218 kilometres northeast of Lagos with a population of over 500,000 people, which was the highest in Osun State according to the national population census of 2006.

A short introductory expose of Ile Ife in the Ufẹ̀ dialect by a native speaker

According to the traditions of the Yoruba religion, Ilé-Ifẹ̀ was founded by the order of the Supreme Deity Olódùmarè by Ọbatala. It then fell into the hands of his brother Oduduwa, which created enmity between the two. Oduduwa created a dynasty there, and sons and daughters of this dynasty became rulers of many other kingdoms in Yorubaland. The first Ọọ̀ni of Ifẹ̀ was a descendant of Oduduwa, who was the 401st Orisha. The present ruler since 2015 is Oba Adeyeye Enitan Ogunwusi Ojaja II, Ọọ̀ni of Ifẹ̀ who is also a Nigerian accountant. Named as the city of 401 deities, Ifẹ̀ is home to many devotees/votaries of these deities and is where they are routinely celebrated through festivals.

Ilé-Ifẹ̀ is famous for its ancient and naturalistic bronze, stone and terracotta sculptures, dating back to between 1200 and 1400 AD.

== History ==
=== Origin of Ife: Creation of the world ===
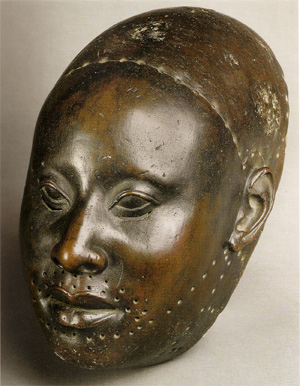
Yoruba Copper mask for King Obalufon, Ife, Nigeria c. AD 1300

According to Yoruba religion, Olodumare, the Supreme God, ordered Obatala to create the earth, however on his way he consumed too much of palm wine and got drunk. Thence, a contemporary Orisha to the former, Oduduwa, took the items of creation from him, descended from the abode of the Orisha on a chain and cast the handful of earth on the primordial ocean. The earth rose and became a mound called Oke Ora. He then put a five-toed cockerel on this primordial mound so that it would scatter the earth around, thus creating the land on which Ile Ife, the first city would be built. Oduduwa planted a palm nut in a hole in the newly formed land and from there sprang a great tree with sixteen branches, a symbolic representation of the 16 clans of the early Ife pre-urban confederation; Elu Merindinlogun, (Thirteen initial and 3 later ones).

The usurpation of creation by Oduduwa, gave rise to an ever-lasting conflict between him and his contemporaneous rival Orisha, Obatala. This symbolic rivalry is still re-enacted in the modern era by the votary groups of the two divinities during the Itapa New Year festival. On account of his creation of the world, Oduduwa became the ancestor of the first divine king of the Yoruba, while Obatala is believed to have created the first Yoruba people out of clay. The meaning of the word "Ife" in Yoruba is "expansion"; "Ile-Ife" is therefore in reference to the myth of origin as "The Land of Expansion" (the word, Ile, as pronounced in modern Yoruba language, means house or home, which would make the name of the city mean "The Home of Expansion").

=== Origin of the regional states: Dispersal from the holy city ===
Oduduwa had sons, daughters, and grandchildren, who went on to found their own kingdoms and empires, including; Ila Orangun, Owu, Ketu, Sabe, Egba, Popo, Ijesha, and Oyo, amongst others. Oranmiyan, Oduduwa's last born (or grandson), was one of his father's principal ministers and overseer of the nascent Edo kingdom after Oduduwa granted the plea of the Edo people for his governance. When Oranmiyan decided to go back to Ile Ife, after a period of service in Benin, he left behind a child named Eweka that he had in the interim with an indigenous princess of Benin, Erinmwinde, daughter of the ninth King (Ogie) of Egor, a neighbouring settlement to nascent Benin. The young boy went on to become the first widely accepted ruler and Oba of the second Edo dynasty that has ruled what is now Benin from that day to this. Oranmiyan later migrated north-westwards into the savanna plains to found Oyo. Oyo later grew to become an empire which at its height, stretched from the western (right) banks of the Niger River to the eastern (left) banks of the Volta River. It would become known as one of the most powerful of Africa's medieval states, prior to its collapse in the mid 19th century.

== Traditional setting ==
House of Oduduwa
- Yoruba royal dynasty
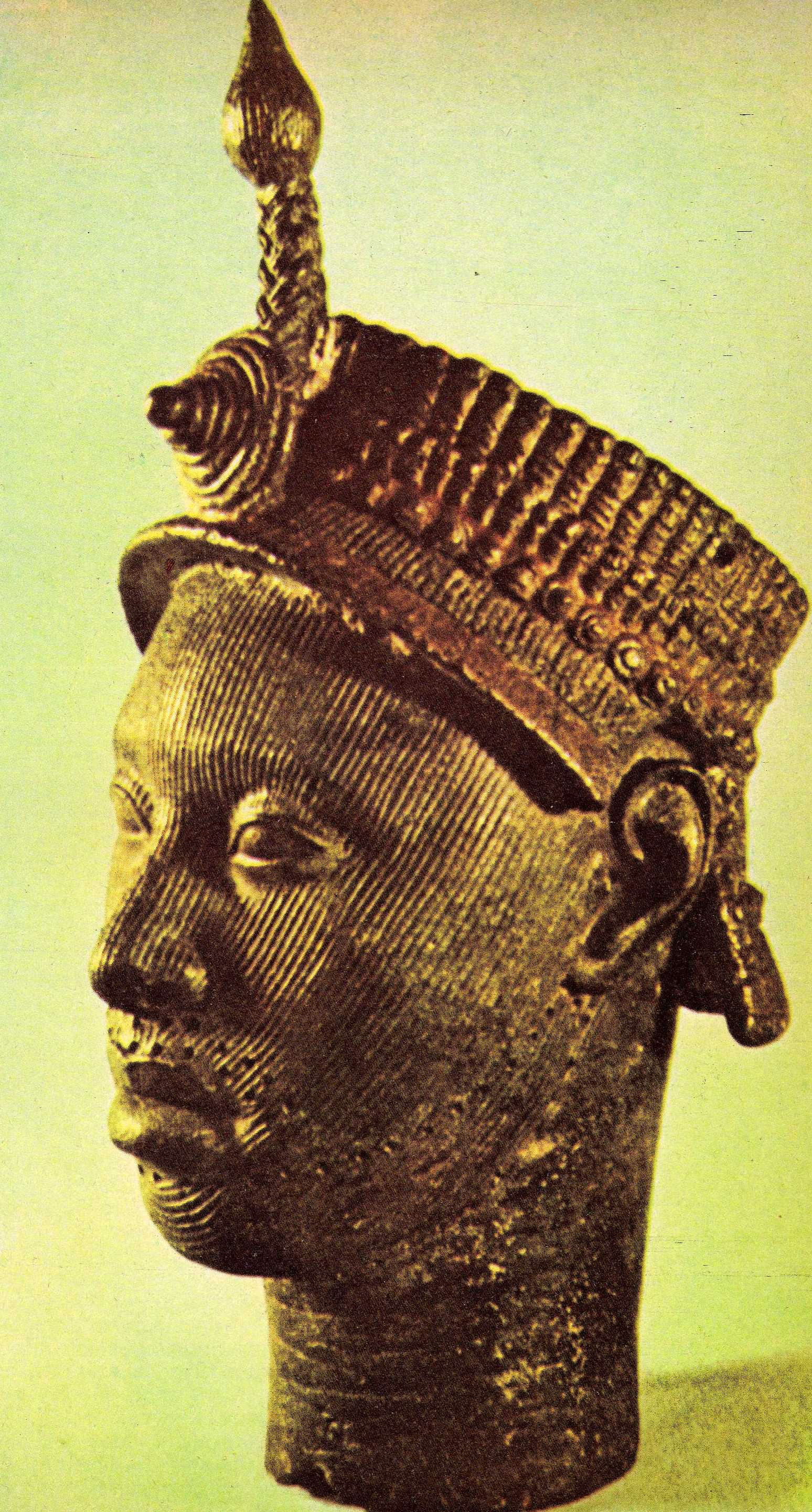
- Ife Head, relic of the royal cult of an ancient Ooni of Ile-Ife and heraldic symbol of Ife royalty
- Parent house: Oke Ora (Historically); Olodumare (God) (Philosophically)
- Current region: Yorubaland
- Founded: c.11th century AD
- Founder: Oduduwa (Olofin Adimula)
- Current head: Ojaja II
- Titles: Ọba, Ọọni Ifẹ; Ọba, Olofin Adimula Ife; Ojoye/Oloye Ife ÌHÀRẸ – Outer/Town chiefs (Àgbà Ifẹ̀): Ọbalufe (Ọ̀runtọ́, 'Prime minister') Ife (Hereditary); Ọbalọran Ife (Hereditary); Ọbajio Ife (Hereditary); Ọbalaye Ife (Hereditary); Akọgun Ife (Hereditary); Waasin ife (Hereditary); Jagunọṣin ife (Nonhereditary); Ejesi Ife (Nonhereditary); MỌDÉWÁ – Inner/Palace chiefs (Ẹmẹsẹ̀): Lọwa Ijaruwa (Leader); Jaaran; Aguro; Arodẹ; Erebẹsẹ; Ishanire; Lọwate; Laadin; Ọmọba Ife; Yeyeluwa Ife; Oloori Ife
- Styles: Kábíèsí; Majesty; Imperial Highness
- Members: Olubuse II; Adesoji Aderemi; Tejumade Alakija
- Connected families: Oyo royal family Bini royal family Ijesha royal family
- Traditions: Ìṣẹ̀ṣe; Christianity; Islam
- Motto: Ilé Ifẹ̀ orírun ayé, Ibi tí ojúmọ́ ti ń mọ́ wá. (Yoruba: Ife, source origin of the world, the place from which dawn begins)
- Cadet branches: In Ife (4): Oshinkola of Iremo; Giesi of Moore; Ogboru of Ilare; Lafogido of Okerewe; Outside Ife (Several): Oyo royal family; Bini royal family; Ketu royal family; Various royal families across Yorubaland.

=== The King (Ooni of Ile-Ife) ===
The Oòni (or king) of Ife is a title of the godking Oduduwa, and some of the other powerful dynastic families of UFE is counted as the spiritual and political leader over the race now called yoruba. The OONI is the stool and title that every King in IFE took after ODUDUWA’s reign. He is the head of spiritual political and military affairs across all the lands before other kingdoms went out of ife to establish their own territories. He is traditionally considered the 401st spirit (Orisha), the only one that speaks. The royal dynasty of Ife traces its origin back to the founding of the city more than ten thousand years before the birth of Jesus Christ. All of the other kings or rulers of today’s “yoruba kingdoms” are referred to as “igbakeji orisha”. Second in command to the ORISHA- OONI. The present ruler is Oba Enitan Adeyeye Ogunwusi (Ojaja II). The Ooni ascended his throne in 2015. Following the formation of the Yoruba Orisha Congress in 1986, the Ooni acquired an international status the likes of which the holders of his title hadn't had since the city's colonisation by the British. Nationally he had always been prominent amongst the Federal Republic of Nigeria's company of royal Obas, being regarded as the chief priest and custodian of the holy city of all the Yorubas. In former times, the palace of the Ooni of Ife was a structure built of authentic enamelled bricks, decorated with artistic porcelain tiles and ornaments. At present, it is a more modern series of buildings. The current Ooni, Oba Adeyeye Enitan Ogunwusi Ojaja II, Ooni of Ife, (born October 17, 1974) is a Nigerian accountant and the 51st Ooni of Ife. He succeeded the late Oba Okunade Sijuwade(Olubuse II) who was the 50th ooni of Ife, and who died on July 28, 2015.

=== Cults of Divinities ===
Ife is dubbed "the city of 401 deities" (also known as irumole or orishas). It is said that every day of the year traditional worshippers celebrate a festival of one of these deities. Often the festivals extend over more than one day and they involve both priestly activities in the palace and theatrical dramatisations in the rest of the kingdom. Historically the King only appeared in public during the annual Olojo festival (celebration of the new dawn); other important festivals here include the Itapa festival for Obatala and Obameri, the Edi festival for Moremi Ajasoro and the Ugbo with their Igare (Oluyare) masqueraders.

=== Art history ===
Kings and gods were often depicted with large heads because the artists believed that the Ase was held in the head, the Ase being the inner power and energy of a person. Both historic figures of Ife and the offices associated with them are represented. One of the best documented among this is the early king Obalufon II who is said to have invented bronze casting and is honoured in the form of a naturalistic copper life-size mask.

The city was a settlement of substantial size between the 12th and 14th centuries, with houses featuring potsherd pavements. Ilé-Ifè is known worldwide for its ancient and naturalistic bronze, stone and terracotta sculptures, which reached their peak of artistic expression between 1200 and 1400 In the period around 1300 the artists at Ife developed a refined and naturalistic sculptural tradition in terracotta, stone and copper alloy—copper, brass, and bronze—many of which appear to have been created under the patronage of King Obalufon II, the man who today is identified as the Yoruba patron deity of brass casting, weaving and regalia. After this period, production declined as political and economic power shifted to the nearby kingdom of Benin which, like the Yoruba kingdom of Oyo, developed into a major empire.

Bronze and terracotta art created by this civilisation are significant examples of naturalism in pre-colonial African art and are distinguished by their variations in regalia, facial marking patterns, and body proportions. Ancient Ife also was famous for its glass beads which have been found at sites as far away as Mali, Mauritania, and Ghana.

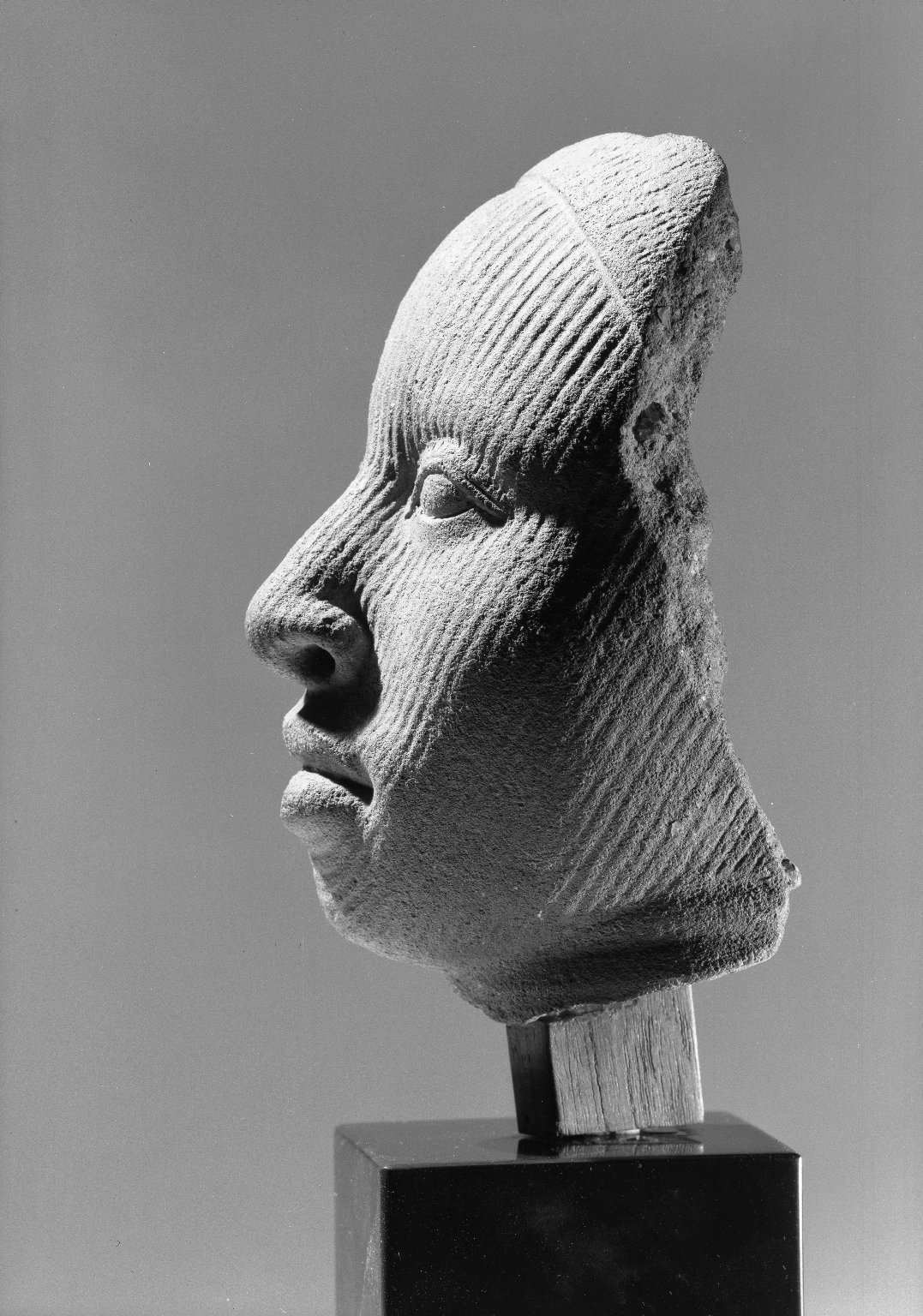
Terracotta head representing Ooni or King of Ife, 12th to 16th century

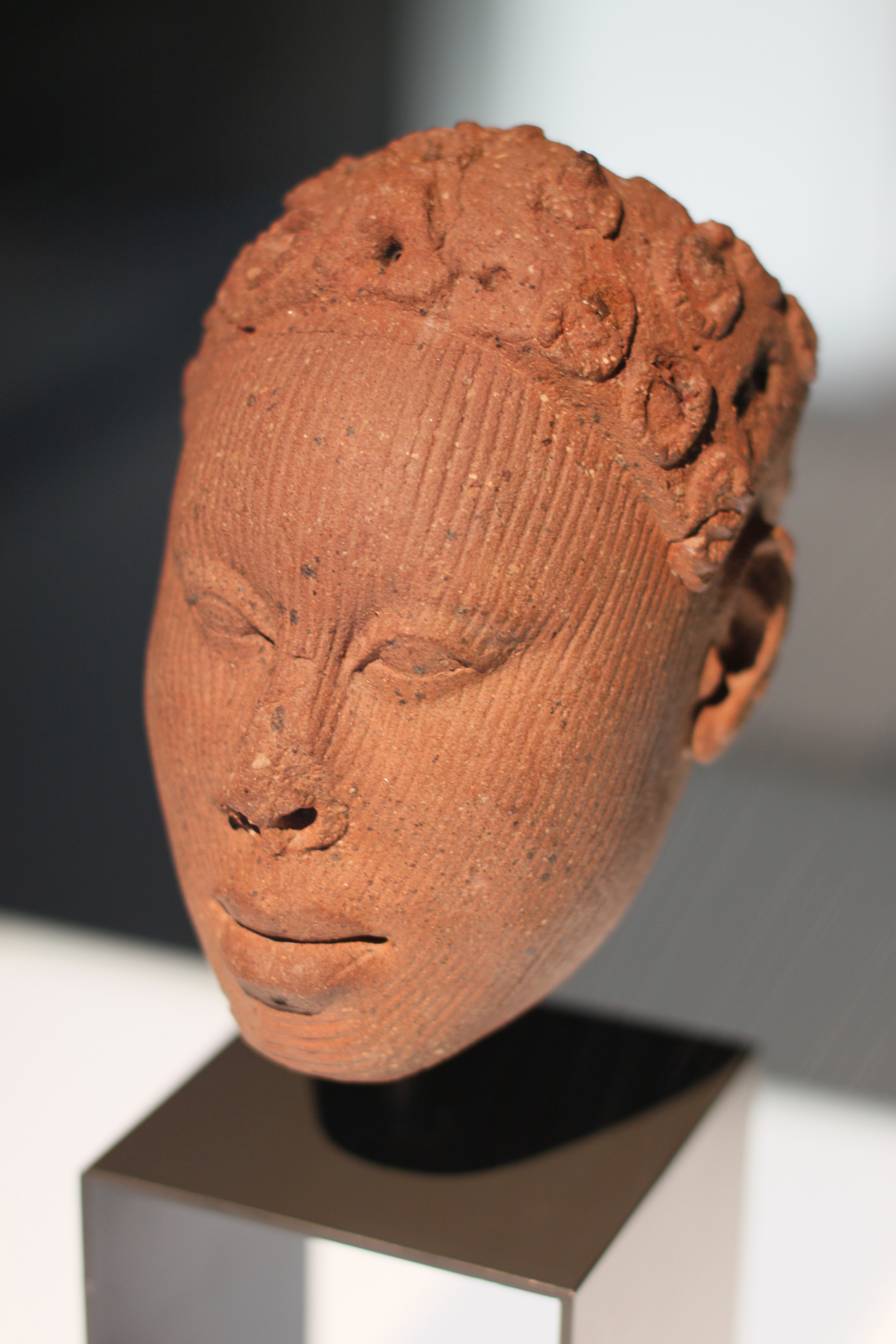
A sculpture of an Ife king or dignitary in the collection of the Ethnological Museum of Berlin

== Shrines, altars, and temples ==
Igbo Olokun: Igbo Olokun used to be a forested, sacred grove (igbo) that housed shrines at which the goddess Olokun was worshipped. Igbo Olokun in the city of Ile-Ife, in south-western Nigeria, was said to have a history of glass makers with unique manufacturing techniques in West Africa. Glass beads and associated production materials were found there during excavation. Analysis of the composition of the artefacts and preliminary dating of the site puts the main timing of glass-working between the 11th and 15th centuries AD. The results of these studies suggest that glass bead manufacture at this site was largely independent of glass-making traditions documented farther afield, and that Igbo Olokun may represent one of the earliest known glass-production workshops in West Africa. The location is not divulged except on request and permission of the keepers of the shrine because it is a sacred grove.

Oduduwa Shrine and Grove: The shrine of the progenitor of the Yoruba race. Worshippers and initiates flood the place seeking blessings and paying obeisance to the originator of their civilisation.

Agbonniregun Temple: The grove of Ọrunmila, an Orisha. He is the Orisha of wisdom, knowledge, and divination. This source of knowledge is believed to have a keen understanding of the human form and of purity, and is therefore praised as often being more effective than other remedies.

== Archaeology ==
Solomon's knot, Ìbọ̀, a quasi-heraldic symbol of Yoruba royalty

Burnt pipes (or tuyere), stone tools, broken calabash, decorated potsherds, and pottery (e.g., rimsherd, plane-sherd body, broken, and washed pottery) were excavated at Iyekere. Iron smelting, charcoal utilised in the process of smelting, and iron slags involved in pitting were also discovered.

Iron smelting occurred in the Ife region. The yield and efficiency were quite high as the iron smelting process yielded ore grade near 80 percent iron oxide, lean slag possessed less than 60 percent iron oxide, and no greater than the required amount of iron oxide in the slag was left for slag formation. While more excavation is needed to produce a more accurate estimate for the age of the smelting site, it can be approximated to likely being precolonial, during the Late Iron Age.

Igbo Olokun, also known as Olokun Grove, may be one of the earliest workshops for producing glass in West Africa. Glass production may have begun during, if not before, the 11th century. The 11th - 15th century were the peak of glass production. High lime, high alumina (HLHA) and low lime, high alumina (LLHA) glass are distinct compositions that were developed using locally sourced recipes, raw materials, and pyrotechnology. The presence of HLHA glass beads discovered throughout West Africa (e.g., Igbo-Ukwu in southern Nigeria, Gao and Essouk in Mali, and Kissi in Burkina Faso), after the ninth century AD, reveals the broader importance of this glass industry in the region and shows its participation in regional trade networks (e.g., trans-Saharan trade, trans-Atlantic trade). Glass beads served as “the currency for negotiating political power, economic relations, and cultural/spiritual values” for “Yoruba, West Africans, and the African diaspora.”

In Osun Grove, the distinct glassmaking technology produced by the Yoruba persisted into the seventeenth century.

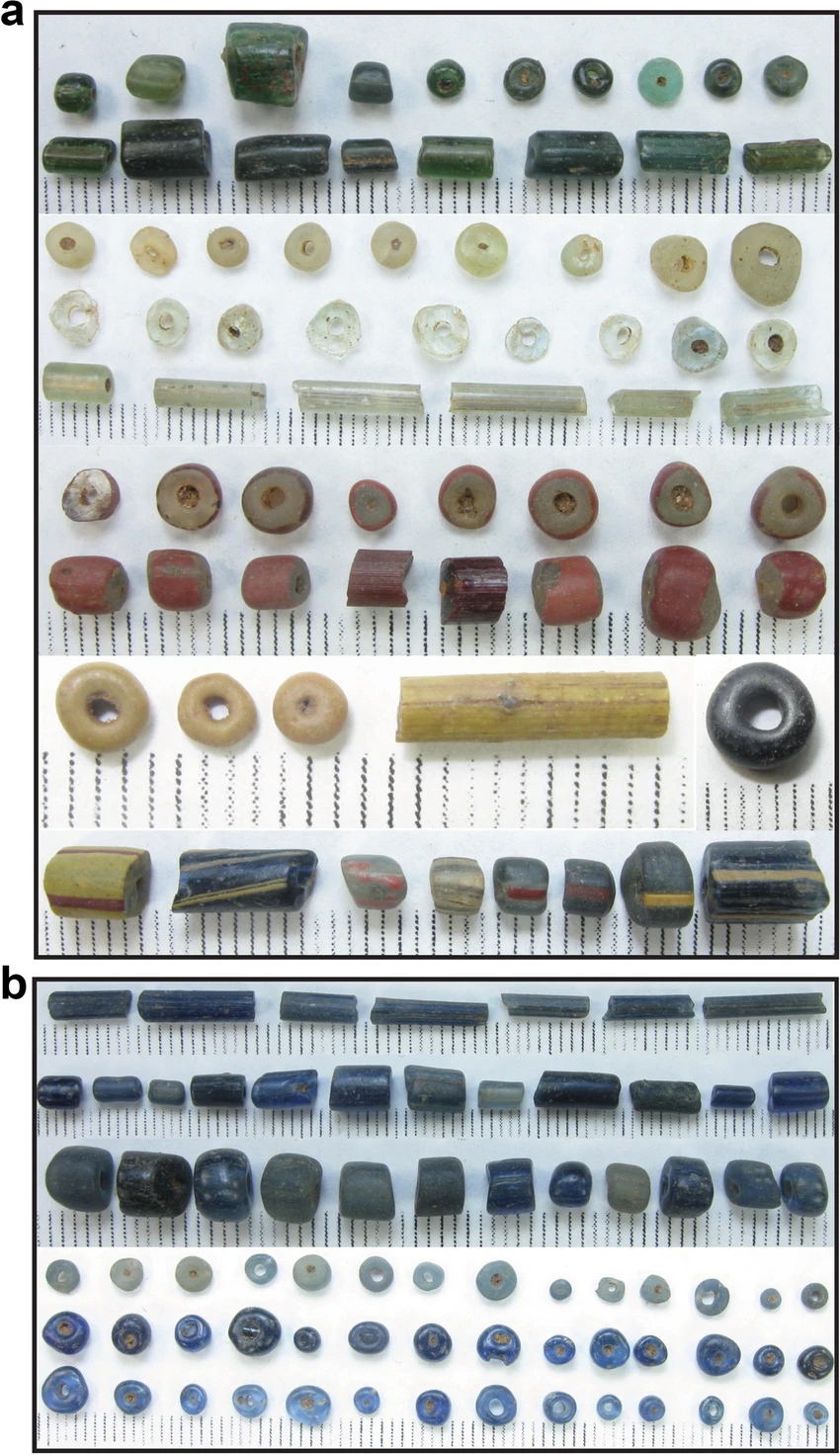
Glass beads of different colors and shapes from Ile-Ife, Nigeria

== Government ==
The main city of Ife is divided into two local government areas: Ife East, headquartered at Oke-ogbo and Ife central at Ajebandele area of the city. Both local governments are composed of a total of 21 political wards. The city has an estimated population of 355,813 people.

== Geography ==
Situated between latitudes 7°28′N and 7°45′N and longitudes 4°30′E and 4°34′E. Ife has a mixed rural-urban landscape with settlements outside of the main urban core, where agriculture is the pre-occupation of most people. Ife has an undulating terrain underlain by metamorphic rocks and characterised by two types of soils, deep clay soils on the upper slopes and sandy soils on the lower parts. Within the tropical savanna climate zone of West Africa. It has average rainfall of 1,000–1,250 mm (39–49 in) usually from March to October and a mean relative humidity of 75% to 100%. Ife is east of the city of Ibadan and connected to it through the Ife-Ibadan highway; Ife is also 40 km (25 mi) from Osogbo and has road networks to other cities such as Ede, Ondo and Ilesha. There is the Opa river and reservoir, that serves as a water treatment facility for OAU college.

== Climate ==
In Ifé, the dry season is muggy and partially cloudy, and the temperature is high all year round. The wet season is oppressive and overcast. The average annual temperature ranges from 19 to 34 °C (66 to 93 °F), rarely falling below 16 °C (60 °F) or rising over 37 °C (98 °F).

=== Temperature ===
From January 22 to April 4, the hot season, with an average daily high temperature exceeding 91 °F, lasts for 2.4 months. In Ifé, March is the hottest month of the year, with an average high of 92 °F and low of 73 °F. From June 14 to October 6, the cool season, which has an average daily high temperature below 84 °F, lasts for 3.8 months.

August is the coldest month of the year in Ifé, with an average low temperature of 71 °F and high temperature of 82 °F.

=== Cloud cover ===
The average proportion of sky covered by clouds at Ife varies significantly seasonally throughout the year.

Ile-Ife experiences 2.9 months of clearer weather, which starts about November 17 and ends around February 13. December is the clearest month of the year, with a 50% average percentage of clear, mostly clear, or partly overcast skies.

Around February 13 of each year, the cloudier period starts, lasts for 9.1 months, and ends around November 17. April is the month with the most cloud cover; on average, 86% of the town has overcast or mainly cloudy skies during this month.

=== Precipitation ===
A day is considered to be wet if there has been at least 1.0 millimetre (0.04 inches) of liquid or liquid-equivalent precipitation. In Ifé, the likelihood of rainy days varies a great deal from season to season.

The 6.6-month wetter season, which runs from April 7 to October 27, has a more than 45% chance of precipitation on any one day. In Ifé, September has an average of 25.4 days with at least 1.0 millimetre (0.04 inches) of precipitation, making it the month with the most rainy days.

From late October to early April, a period of about 5.4 months, is the dry season. December has an average of 1.4 days with at least 1.0 millimetre (0.04 inches) of precipitation, making it the month with the fewest wet days in Ifé. With an average of 25.4 days, September is the month in Ifé with the most rainy days. According to this classification, rain alone has the highest probability of all types of precipitation, peaking at 86% on September 22.

== Economy ==
Ife contains attractions like the Natural History Museum of Nigeria. Ife is home to a regional agricultural centre with an area that produces vegetables, grain, cocoa, tobacco, and cotton. Ife has a few open markets, such as Oja Titun or Odo-gbe market with about 1,500 shops.

In terms of development, the Ife central area of Ilé Ifè is more developed. The areas include Parakin, Eleyele, Modomo, Damico, and Crown Estate Area. These areas are characterised by modern houses, good road network, constant electricity and security.

== Education ==
Ife has several universities that are well-known both in Nigeria and internationally; such as the Obafemi Awolowo University (formerly University of Ife), and Oduduwa University.

It is also home to the Seventh Day Adventist Grammar School, Ile-Ife, Oduduwa College and Moremi High School, which are notable schools established over 30 years ago.

== Notable people ==
- Adesoji Aderemi; (Atobatele I) (1889-1980), 49th Ọọ̀ni of Ifẹ̀
- Dele Momodu (born 1960), journalist
- Tunde Odunlade (born 1954), artist and musician
- Adeyeye Enitan Ogunwusi; (Ọjájá II) (born 1974), 51st Ọọ̀ni of Ifẹ̀
- Femi Fani-Kayode (born 1960), Nigerian politician, essayist, poet and lawyer
- Iyiola Omisore (born 1957), Nigerian businessman, engineer and politician
- Chief Remi Adetokunboh Fani-Kayode, Q.C., SAN, CON
- Alayeluwa Oba Okunade Sijuwade Olubuse II (1930–2015), 50th Ọọ̀ni of Ifẹ̀

== See also ==
- Ife Empire
- History of the Yoruba people
- List of rulers of Ife
