= Adesoji Aderemi =

Nigerian traditional ruler (1889–1980)

Oba Sir Adésọjí Tadéniáwò Adérẹ̀mí KCMG, KBE
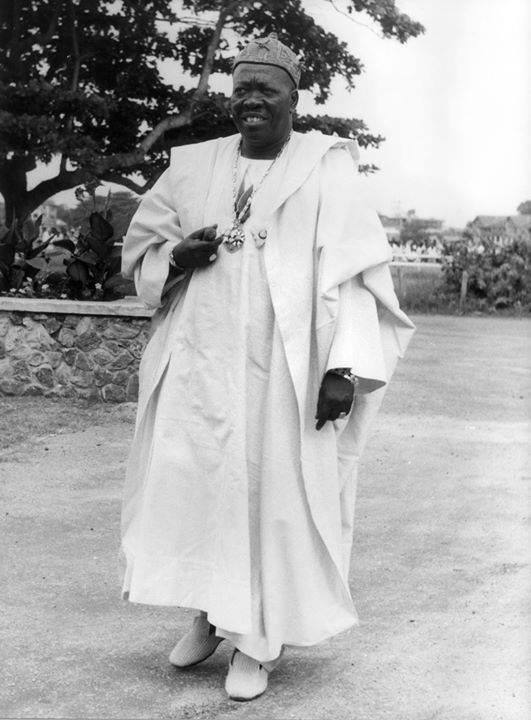

Governor of Western Region
- In office 1960–1962
- Preceded by: Sir John Rankine
- Succeeded by: Moses Majekodunmi (as Administrator of Western Nigeria)

Ooni of Ife
- In office 2 September 1930 – 3 July 1980
- Preceded by: Ademiluyi Ajagun
- Succeeded by: Okunade Sijuwade

Personal details
- Born: 15 November 1889 Ile-Ife, Ife Kingdom (now Nigeria)
- Died: 3 July 1980 (aged 90) Ile-Ife, Oyo State, Nigeria (now in Osun State, Nigeria)

Oba Sir Titus Martins Adesoji Tadeniawo Aderemi (Atobatele I), (Note: Yoruba pronunciation) alias Adesoji Aderemi (Note: Yoruba pronunciation) KCMG, KBE (15 November 1889 – 3 July 1980), was a Nigerian political figure and Yoruba traditional ruler as the Ooni (King) of Ife (or Ilé-Ifẹ̀, as it is properly known) from 1930 until 1980. He served as the governor of Western Region, Nigeria between 1960 and 1962.

Adesoji Aderemi was known as a wealthy man and had a large family of many wives and children. One of his children was the civil servant Tejumade Alakija.

During the colonial era, the Oba Ooni gained a considerable amount of power due to the colonial policy of indirect rule and being labelled a first class Oba among traditional rulers in Yorubaland. The policy of indirect rule was used to ensure native awareness and consultations about colonial policies affecting the regions. The British leaned on existing native political structures and hierarchy, particularly the Nigerian traditional rulers, for political consultation and tax collection. Later on, the Ooni with the consent of the leading Yoruba political leaders used his position to close the gaps of exploitation of divisional differences among Yorubas and tried fervently to rally the Yoruba towards a common goal.

In 1962, the king acting as governor, used his power to remove the premier of the region, sensing the premier did not have the support of the majority members of the House of Assembly. The event escalated the political rivalries in the region.

== Early life ==
He was born on 15 November 1889, during the turbulence of the Yoruba civil war to Prince Osundeyi Gbadebo of the Osinkola ruling house of Ile Ife and Madam Adekunbi Itiola of Ipetumodu, (she was his 19th and youngest wife). In the absence of his warrior father, who was on a war expedition; he was named Adesoji Aderemi, meaning "The crown has woken up," and "The crown consoles me," respectively.

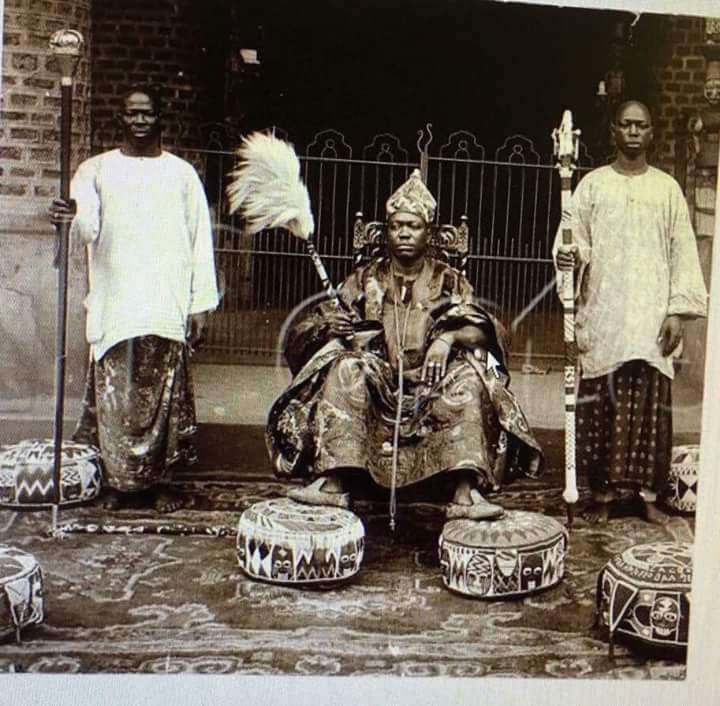
Oba Aderemi as a young King, 1930

On Prince Gbadebo's return, Adesoji's older sister Ibiyemi, unable to contain her excitement of the news, had to be held back from initial physical contact with her war-weary and juju laden father. Until he had rid himself of his protective war attire by appeasing his gods, then was it safe to embrace his family.

Prince Gbadebo being an Ifa priest, presented his newborn to his Ifa Oracle demanding to know what the future holds for the new baby Aderemi. The father was told to bow to his son. The Ifa predicted that baby Aderemi, was going to wear the crown of his ancestors, that his reign will be known far and wide, and he will come in contact with strangers in far away places.

Prince Gbadebo told his wife to get coral beads to dress his son as was customary for royalty. In the belief of the oracle, mother-Adekunbi went into protective mode, always washing Aderemi in herbs, until he outgrew her methods. His father died in 1897 when he was 8 years old. Having lost his father at an early age, he was raised by his mother. The emergence of Christianity dissuaded his mother from the traditional family worship of Ifa, hence his enrollment at the new local Christian primary school of St Phillips, Ife, as one of the first students in Ife to attend a local school in 1901.

The young Prince Aderemi had a vision. His objection to farming with his much older and beloved brothers, Papa Prince Adeyemo and Prince Samuel Adetunji Adewuyi [Sooko Laekun], led to his enrollment at the Anglican primary school at Aiyetoro, Ile-Ife.

== Ooni of Ife: 1930–1980 ==
Prince Aderemi's wealth and exposure made him the clear candidate to rise to the throne of Ile-Ife. Upon the death of Oba Ademiluyi, his predecessor, he became the outstanding contestant for the throne.

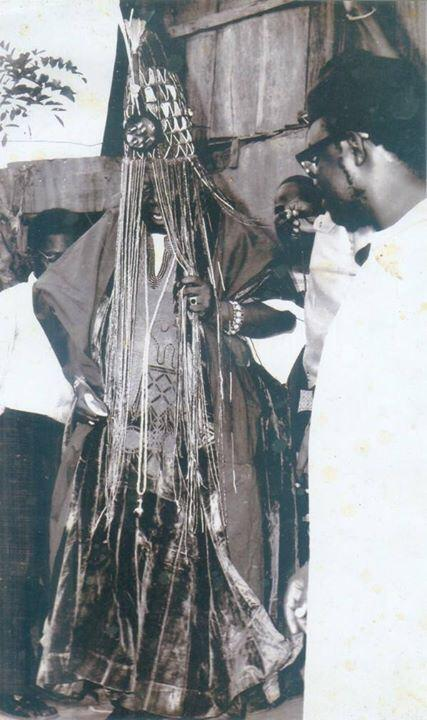
Oba Aderemi at an Olojo festival outing

On the 2nd of September, he became the 49th Ooni of Ife. He was widely dubbed the first literate Ooni. Oba Aderemi quickly acclimatised himself to his new environment, at 40, he was the youngest of the Yoruba Obas at the time. Oba Aderemi with the aid of the traditional Ife elders, (Obalufe, Obajio, Obaloran, Wasin, Obalaye, Akogun, Jagunosin, Ejesi), formed the administrative set up that transformed the ancient town in the next decade. Oba Aderemi championed Education during his reign as Ooni, which was the sentiment behind the foundation of Oduduwa College in January 1932. Oba Aderemi personally funded the construction of the Secondary School, a model institution at the time; Oba Aderemi believed that the surest way to facilitate and sustain modernisation is through education.

A great landmark of his reign pertaining education was the foundation of the University of Ife, which many attributed to Oba Aderemi's influence in the ruling Government, with the Ooni tenaciously proposing Ife as the ideal location for the foremost institution to be situated. Oba Aderemi constructed the main building of his palace, which remains a mainstay of the Ife palace to date - with its unique colonial-style. Ooni Aderemi served as the permanent chairman of the council of Obas from 1966 to 1980.

His reign as Ooni was remarkably peaceful, with his innovative ideas in business creating a pathway to wealth for a lot of indigenes, especially in the agriculture industry, where he was a business leader himself.

== Notes ==
Region	Period	Governor	Premier	Notes
Eastern Region	Oct 1960 - Jan 1966	Francis Akanu Ibiam	Michael Okpara	
Mid-Western Region	Aug 1963 - Feb 1964	Dennis Osadebay	Dennis Osadebay (Administrator)	Region created from part of Western Region on 8 August 1963
Mid-Western Region	Feb 1964 - Jan 1966	Jereton Mariere	Dennis Osadebay	
Northern Region	Oct 1960 - 1962	Gawain Westray Bell	Ahmadu Bello	
Northern Region	1962 - Jan 1966	Kashim Ibrahim	Ahmadu Bello	
Western Region	Oct 1960 - May 1962	Adesoji Aderemi	Samuel Ladoke Akintola	
Western Region	May 1962 - Dec 1962	Adesoji Aderemi	Moses Majekodunmi (Administrator)	Administrator appointed during political crisis
Western Region	Jan 1963 - Jan 1966	Joseph Fadahunsi	Samuel Akintola	
