= Tejumade Alakija =

Nigerian civil servant (1925 – 2013)

Omoba Tejumade Alakija
- Born: 17 May 1925; Nigeria
- Died: August 2013 (aged 88); University College Hospital, Ibadan
- Education: she went to primary school in Ile Ife, middle school at Kudeti Girls School Ibadan then to CMS Girls School Lagos to complete her secondary school education.
- Title: Omoba

Tejumade Alakija (17 May 1925 – August, 2013) was a Nigerian civil servant who rose to be the first female head of Oyo State's civil service.

== Life ==
Princess Alakija was born on 17 May 1925 to her father, Sir Adesoji Aderemi, the Ooni of Ife, in Ile-Ife, Oyo State in the south-western part of Nigeria. She went to Aiyetoro Primary and Central Schools in Ile-Ife, then Kudeti Girls School in Molete, Ibadan for her secondary education. Furthering her education, Alakija earned a bachelor's degree in history at Westfield College in the University of London, England. She trained to be a teacher, and passed her PGCE at Oxford University between 1950 and 1951, then joined the Nigerian civil service where she was directed to teach.

She started her teaching career at Queen's School, Ede, Osun State, and later transferred to the new Government Girls’ Secondary Grammar School where she worked from 1951 to 1953. During her career as a teacher, she founded a school named Girls' Secondary Grammar School in 1953. She also worked at the Ministry of Works and Ministry of Trade and Industries as the Assistant Secretary and was appointed as Training Officer-in Charge of the region's Public Service Training Programme and secretary of some important commissions. Respectively from 1960 to 1964, and later, she became Chief Investment Officer in the Ministry of Trade and Industries in charge of Industrial Promotions from 1969 to 1972.

Princess Alakija also served in some key ministries, such as the Ministry of Health as the Deputy Permanent Secretary in 1978, and also in Ministry of Education as Permanent Secretary in 1979, before becoming the head of state civil service in Oyo State.

She rose to be the first female head of Oyo State's civil service. From 1993 to 1997, she was Pro-Chancellor of the University of Abuja.

Princess Alakija died in University College Hospital, Ibadan in 2013.
