= Adeola Austin Oyinlade =

Nigerian human rights lawyer

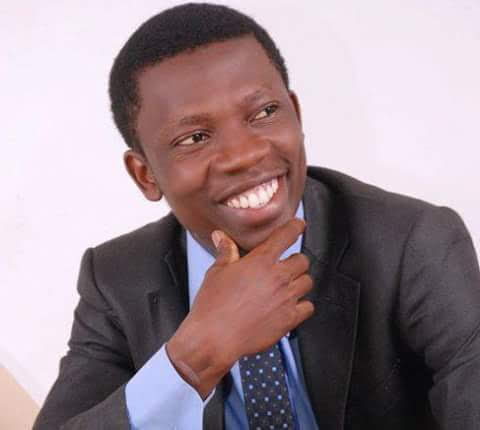
- Born: 6 August 1981 (age 45); Akure, Ondo State, Nigeria
- Education: University of Lagos
- Occupations: Legal practitioner, Nigerian human rights lawyer
- Years active: (2008–present)
- Notable work: "Know Your Rights Nigeria" human rights empowerment app, Peace Building
- Awards: 2018 International Bar Association (IBA) Human Rights Award for outstanding contribution by a Legal Practitioner to Human Rights
- Website: www.adeolaoyinlade.com

Adeola Austin Oyinlade (born 6 August 1981) is a Nigerian human rights lawyer.

== Early life and education ==
Adeola Austin Oyinlade was born on 6 August 1981 in Akure, Akure South Local Government Area of Ondo State, Nigeria to the family of Elder and Mrs. Oyinlade.

He obtained his undergraduate (LL.B) and postgraduate (LL.M- Master of Laws) degrees from University of Lagos.

== Career and legal practice ==
Oyinlade is the Principal Partner of Adeola Oyinlade & Co; a law firm based in Lagos, Nigeria with practices in human rights, Intellectual Property, Commercial, Corporate and International Law.

He worked for the African Union Commission (AU). He created "Know Your Rights Nigeria" initiative on radio (UNILAG FM) and founded 'Constitutional Rights Awareness and Liberty Initiative; a Non-Governmental organization.

== Public speaking ==
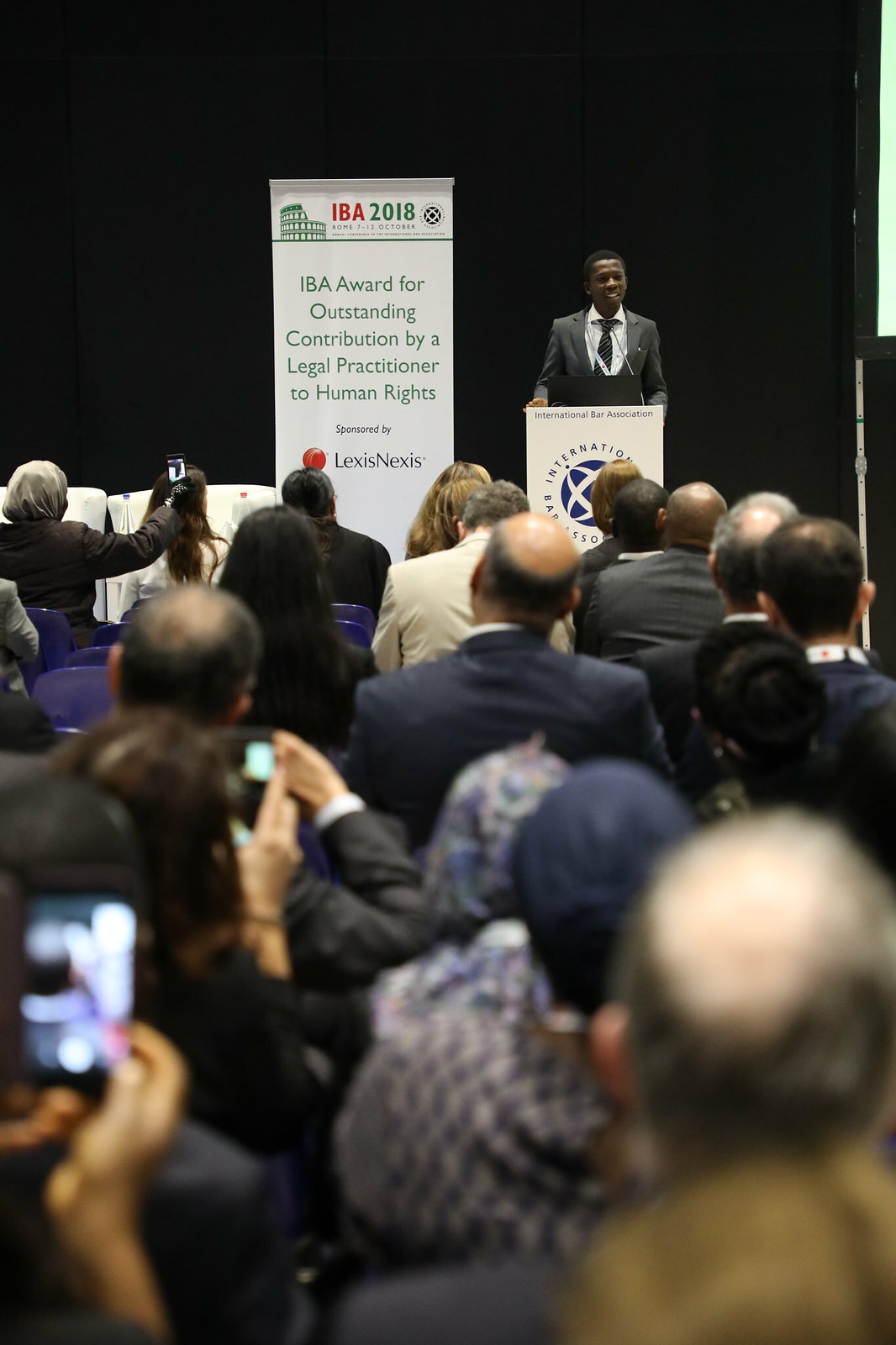
Adeola Oyinlade speaking at the International Bar Association (IBA) Conference in Rome in 2018.

In April 2011, Oyinlade addressed the plenary sessions of the African Union's Pre-AU Summit (African Youth Forum 2011) in Addis Ababa, Ethiopia; the 7th UNESCO Youth Forum in Paris, France in and others.

== Awards and honours ==
- In May 2010, he was commissioned as the United Nations Young Ambassador for Peace
- In 2011, he was a finalist, Bremen Peace Awards 2011 of Threshold Foundation for Exemplary Commitments to Justice, Peace and Integrity of Creation in Germany for "taking the legal path to justice" in Nigeria.
- In 2014, he was invited alongside his colleague from Morocco, Karima Rhanem, as co-founders of the African Network of Youth Policy to launch the network at the UN.
- In December 2014, Youth Action Network for Human Rights made a 13-minute documentary in commemoration of International Human Rights Day 2014 by profiling Adeola's work to inspire youths in taking the lead in human rights promotion and protection.
- Adeola Austin Oyinlade was named among Top Under 40 CEOs in Nigeria
- In October 2018, Oyinlade was declared winner of the International Bar Association (IBA) Human Rights Award for Outstanding Contribution by a Legal Practitioner to Human Rights in Rome, Italy.
- In August 2021, he was named the 2021 American Bar Association (ABA) International Human Rights Award Recipient at ABA Annual Meeting in Chicago, United States
