= Festus Akingbaso =

Nigerian politician

Festus Olanrewaju Akingbaso
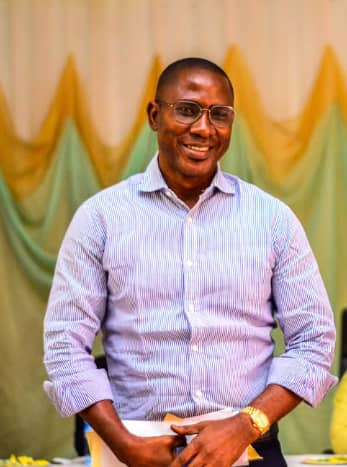

Member of House of Representatives
- Incumbent
- In office June 2023 – June 2027
- Constituency: Idanre / Ifedore Federal Constituency

Personal details
- Born: June 6, 1970 (age 56)
- Party: Peoples Democratic Party
- Occupation: Politician

Festus Olanrewaju Akingbaso commonly known as Fessy West (Born 6 June 1970) is a Nigerian entrepreneur and politician, he is currently serving as the representative for the Idanre/Ifedore Federal Constituency in the 10th House of Representatives under the platform of the Peoples Democratic Party.

== Background and early life ==
Festus was Born on 6 June 1970. He is from Idanre in Ondo State.

== Political career ==
Akingbaso served as the Executive Chairman of Idanre Local Government Council in 2015. He also served as a member representing the Idanre Constituency in the Ondo State House of Assembly. In 2020, he rejected his appointment as Deputy Minority Leader in the Ondo State House of Assembly, stating he was unaware of the impeachment of Deputy Speaker Ogundeji Iroju. In 2023, he was elected to represent the Idanre/Ifedore Federal Constituency under the platform of the People's Democratic Party (PDP). In July 2024, the PDP selected Festus as the Deputy Governorship candidate, pairing him with Agboola Ajayi.

Akingbaso has contributed to community development through initiatives supporting the establishment of Local Council Development Areas (LCDAs) within his constituency. He also initiated an educational support program within the federal constituency.
