= Ogunwumiju =

Ogunwumiju is a surname. Notable people with the surname include:

- Helen Ogunwumiju (born 1957), Nigerian judge
- Otunba Moyinolorun Ogunwumiju (born 1988), Nigerian politician
