= Gbegudu Ololade James =

Nigeria politician

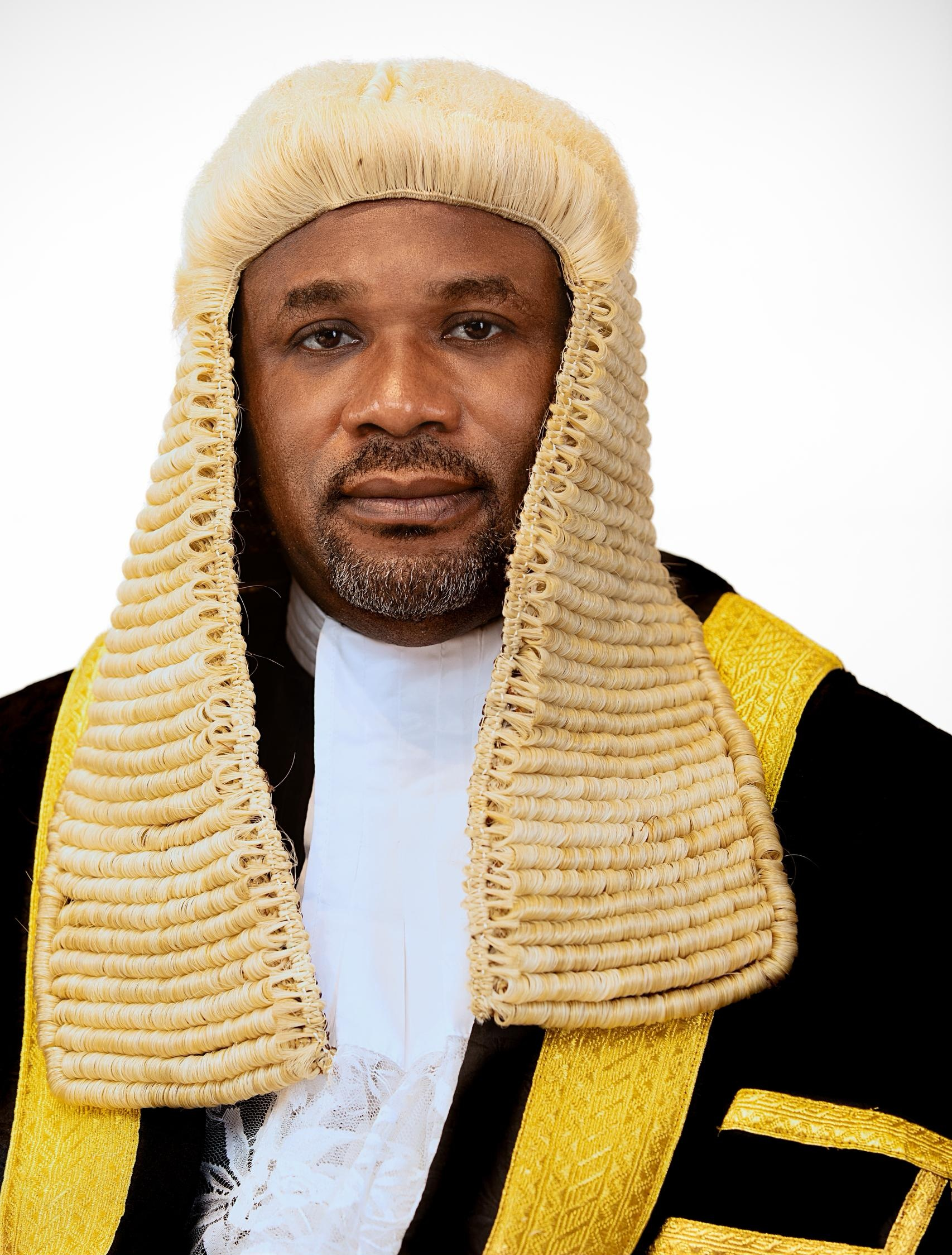

Member Ondo State House of Assembly
- Incumbent
- Assumed office 2019
- Preceded by: Jumoke Akindele
- Constituency: Okitipupa Constituency II

Deputy Speaker Ondo State House of Assembly
- Incumbent
- Assumed office 2025
- Preceded by: Abayomi Akinruntan

Personal details
- Party: All Progressive Congress (APC)
- Education: Obafemi Awolowo University
- Occupation: politician

Gbegudu Ololade James is a Nigerian politician who serves as the Deputy Speaker of the Ondo State House of Assembly. He represents Okitipupa Constituency II in Ondo State.

== Early life and education ==
Gbegudu Ololade James was born in Igodan Lisa, in Okitipupa Local Government Area of Ondo State, Nigeria, into the family of Elder Adeyinka Gbegudu and Mrs. Boladele Gbegudu.

He began his early education at St. Theresa’s Primary School in Akure. He proceeded to Unity Secondary School, Ode-Aye, and later attended Ife Grammar School, Ile-Ife, Osun State. He obtained his tertiary education at Obafemi Awolowo University, Ile-Ife.

== Career ==
Gbegudu is a member of the Ondo State House of Assembly representing Okitipupa Constituency II in Ondo State. He is affiliated with the All Progressives Congress (APC).

Gbegudu was first elected to the Ondo State House of Assembly in October 2019 following a judicial process. During his tenure, he served as Chairman of the House Committee on Security, Culture, Tourism, Community Development, and Cooperative Services, where he participated in legislative oversight and deliberations on matters relating to security and community development.

On July 3, 2025, he was elected Deputy Speaker of the Ondo State House of Assembly following a leadership reorganisation within the legislature.

While serving as committee chairman, Gbegudu contributed to the development and passage of several key legislations, including:

- Ondo State Security Network Agency (Amotekun) Law
- Ondo State Security Trust Fund Law
- Ondo State Anti-Grazing Law
- State Road Trust Fund Law
- Rural Access Road Authority Law
