= Ogundeji Iroju =

Nigerian politician

Deputy Speaker, Ondo State House of Assembly
- In office 2015–2023
- Preceded by: Dare Emiola
- Succeeded by: Gbegudu Ololade James

Personal details
- Born: Ore, Ondo State, Nigeria
- Education: Ekiti State University, Adekunle Ajasin University
- Occupation: Politician; Lawyer

Ogundeji Iroju is a Nigerian politician, lawyer, and accountant. He served as the deputy speaker of the Ondo State House of Assembly. As a member, he represented Odigbo Constituency 1.

== Political career ==
In 2013, Ogundeji Iroju was appointed by then Governor Olusegun Mimiko as Commissioner for Employment and Productivity in the Ondo State Executive Council. He was sworn in alongside other nominees and tasked with overseeing initiatives in employment and workforce development in the state.

In 2015, Iroju was elected a member of the Ondo State House of Assembly , representing the Odigbo Constituency 1 in the 8th Assemblies. At the state assembly, he was elected as the deputy speaker. During the 2019 election cycle, he was elected Deputy Speaker of the Ondo State House of Assembly for the second term.

In 2020, while serving as Deputy Speaker, he was suspended and subsequently removed from the position by members of the Assembly amid internal disagreements.

Following his removal, Ogundeji challenged the Assembly's action in court, arguing that the impeachment process did not comply with constitutional and procedural requirements. In January 2023, an Akure High Court ruled that his removal was illegal, null and void, and ordered his reinstatement as Deputy Speaker.

The State House of Assembly appealed this ruling, but in August 2024 the Court of Appeal sitting in Akure upheld the earlier judgment, describing the Assembly's action as unconstitutional and ordered that Ogundeji be reinstated with all entitlements due to him as a lawmaker and Deputy Speaker.

=== Special Adviser on Legislative Matters ===
In September 2026, Governor Lucky Aiyedatiwa appointed Ogundeji Iroju as Special Adviser on Legislative Matters. The appointment was announced on 14 September 2026 by the governor's Chief Press Secretary, Prince Ebenezer Adeniyan. He was sworn into office on 17 September 2026 alongside other newly appointed special advisers and government officials.
