= Mayowa Akinfolarin =

Nigerian politician (born 1962)

Mayowa Samuel Akinfolarin
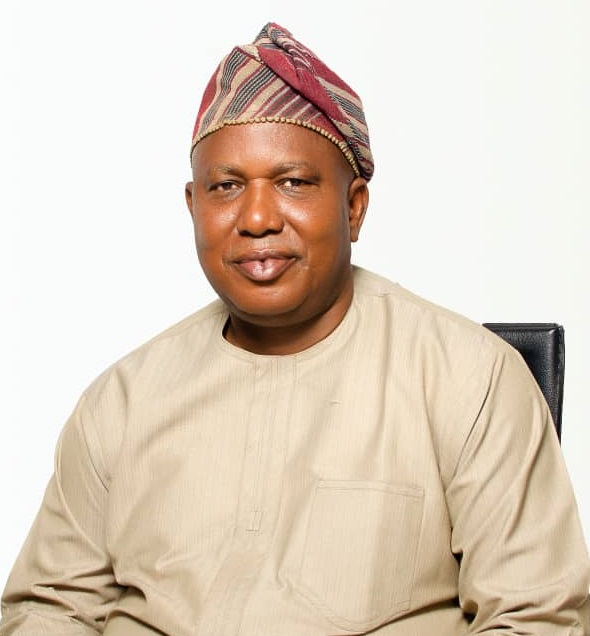

Member of the House of Representatives
- In office 2015–2023
- Succeeded by: Festus Ayodele Adefiranye
- Constituency: Ileoluji-Okeigbo/Odigbo

Deputy Speaker, Ondo State House of Assembly
- In office 2003–2010
- Preceded by: Rt. Hon. Victor Akinwe
- Succeeded by: Rt. Hon. Dare Emiola Francis

Personal details
- Born: 5 January 1962 (age 64) Odigbo, Ondo State, Nigeria
- Education: Ahmadu Bello University, Zaria
- Occupation: Politician; Businessman

Mayowa Samuel Akinfolarin (born 5 January 1962) is a businessman and a Nigerian politician who was a member of the Ondo State House of Assembly from 2003 to 2011 and was also a member of the Nigeria Federal House of Representatives from 2015 to 2023.

== Early life and education ==
Akinfolarin was born on 5 January 1962 he is a native of Odigbo, Ondo State, Nigeria who lived his early life in his hometown of Odigbo; where he attended Our Saviour Primary School, Odigbo from 1969 to1974 and Isero Grammar School, Odigbo from 1976 to 1981.

He further continued his academic pursuit at College of Advanced Studies, Zaria from 1985 to1987. He then proceeded to the Ahmadu Bello University, Zaria to study Sociology and obtained a Bachelor of Science degree in 1990.

== Political career ==
In 2003, Akinfolarin was elected to the Ondo State House of Assembly on the platform of the People Democratic Party PDP, where he served till 2011 and rose to the position of deputy speaker.

In 2015 Nigeria general elections, Akinfolarin won the house of representative seat to represent the interests of Ileoluji/Oke-Igbo/Odigbo constituency on the PDP platform and defected to the All Progressives Congress APC in 2017. He re-contested the seat and again won under the APC in 2019 becoming the only APC candidate that won National Assembly election in Ondo South Senatorial District. Among other several positions, he held the position of the chairman House Committee on Federal Road Safety Corps (FRSC) of the 9th National Assembly.

=== Bills and motions moved ===
As a Member of the House of Representatives in the 8th and 9th Nigeria National Assembly, Mayowa Samuel Akinfolarin has sponsored and moved motions. Some of his moved motions are:

- National Youth Service Corps Trust Fund Establishment Bill, 2021(HB. 1795).
- Establishment Of Federal Road Safety Corps Institutions (FRSC).
- Bitumen Development Commission of Nigeria (Establishment) Bill 2021
- National Cocoa Board (Establishment & Administration) Bill, 2020 (HB. 927)
- Need to Name Akure Airport After Olusegun Agagu
- Legal Crisis hindering the Takeoff of Mambilla Hydro- Power Project in Taraba State
- A Bill for an Act To Amend The Federal Polytechnics Act (Cap F17, Laws of the Federation Of Nigeria, 2004) By Providing for a New Campus in Ile Oluji, Ondo State And For Other Related Matters
- A Bill for an Act to Establish the Anti-Doping Agency of Nigeria, 2017
