= Ondo State Ministry of Health =

Nigerian government ministry

Ondo State Ministry of Health is one of the government ministries in Ondo State, with the responsibility of ensuring qualitative health system and promoting good health care service. Its current commissioner is Banji Awolowo Ajaka. The ministry is located in Alagbaka, Akure is supported by other international Organizations such as World Health Organization in time of urgent interventions.
