= Jumoke Akindele =

Nigerian lawyer

Rt. Hon Jumoke Akindele

Speaker of the Ondo State House of Assembly
- In office 27 May 2015 – 19 March 2017
- Constituency: Ondo, Okitipupa Constituency II

Personal details
- Born: Okitipupa, Ondo State, Nigeria
- Party: All Progressives Congress
- Education: Obafemi Awolowo University
- Occupation: Lawmaking

Jumoke Akindele is a Nigerian lawyer and first female Speaker of the Ondo State House of Assembly.

== Early life ==
Jumoke Akindele was born in Okitipupa, a town in Ondo State southwestern Nigeria. She had her primary education at St. John's Primary School in Okitipupa before she proceeded to St. Louis Girls Secondary School, Ondo where she obtained the West Africa School Certificate in 1981. Jumoke received a bachelor's degree in Law from Obafemi Awolowo University, Ile Ife and practiced law for some years before she ventured into politics in 2006.

== Political career ==
In April 2007, Jumoke contested the seat of the constituency, Okitipupa constituency II but lost to the opposition party. She re-contested on 11 April 2011, and was elected as member of the Ondo State House of Assembly, where she served as Chairman of House Committee on Education before she was elected Speaker of the Assembly. On 27 May 2015, she was elected Speaker of the Assembly following the sudden demise of the former speaker Samuel Adesina. She relinquished the leadership position of the house in a resignation letter dated 20 March 2018. Jumoke Akindele is the first female speaker of the state.
