= Dele (name) =

Délé
- Gender: Unisex
- Language: Yoruba

Origin
- Origin: Nigerian
- Meaning: arrive home
- Region of origin: South-West Nigeria

Dele audio also Délé is a Nigerian given name and surname of Yoruba origin meaning "arrive home" It is also a diminutive of names such as Ayọ̀délé (joy arrived home), Akindélé (warrior arrived home), Oladélé (wealth arrived home), Olúdélé (Lord arrives home), Adédélé(crown/royalty arrives home), etc.

== Notable People with the given name ==
=== Sports ===
- Dele Adebola (born 1975), Nigerian footballer
- Dele Olorundare (born 1992), Nigerian footballer
- Dele Adeleye (born 1988), Nigerian footballer
- Dele Aiyenugba (born 1983), Nigerian footballer
- Dele Ajiboye (born 1990), Nigerian footballer
- Dele Alli (born 1996), English footballer
- Dele Olaoye (born 1982), Nigerian footballer
- Dele (born 2001), Nigerian footballer

=== Writers ===
- Dele Charley (1948–1993), Sierra Leonean writer and playwright
- Dele Olojede (born 1961), Nigerian Pulitzer Prize-winning journalist
- Dele Giwa (1947–1986), Nigerian journalist
- Dele Jegede (born 1945), Nigerian-American painter, art historian, cartoonist, curator, and teacher
- Dele Momodu (born 1960), Nigerian journalist, publisher, businessman, and motivational speaker

=== Others ===
- Dele Odule (born, 1961), Nigerian actor
- Dele Sosimi (born 1963), Nigerian-British musician
- Dele Joseph Ezeoba (born 1958), Nigerian Navy admiral

== Surname ==
People with the surname Dele include:

- Bison Dele (1969–2002), American professional basketball player
- Gilbert Delé (born 1964), French professional boxer.
- Jonathan Dele (1944–2017), Nigerian boxer of the 1960s and '70s
