= Festus Ayodele Adefiranye =

Nigerian politician and engineer

- Born: Festus Ayodele Adefiranye
- Education: University of Lagos
- Predecessor: Mayowa Samuel Akinfolarin
- Political party: All Progressives Congress (APC)
- Website: https://www.festusadefiranye.com.ng/

Festus Ayodele Adefiranye is a former telecommunication engineer, a Nigerian politician and a Member of the House of Representative in the 10th Nigerian National Assembly representing the people of Ileoluji/Okeigbo & Odigbo Federal Constituency. He is from Okeigbo in Ile-Oluji/Okeigbo Local Government of Ondo State.

Festus Ayodele Adefiranye is also a former member of the Ondo State House of Assembly where he contested and won to represent the Ileoluji/Okeigbo State Constituency under the ruling All Progressives Congress(APC). He was Chairman, House Committee on Human Capital Development, Public Accounts and Deputy Chief Whip of the Ondo State House of Assembly between 2019 and 2023.

== Early life and education ==
Festus Ayodele Adefiranye was born in Okeigbo, Ondo State, Nigeria. He had his elementary and secondary educations in Okeigbo before proceeding to then Federal School of Arts and Science Ondo in 1988 for his higher school certificate (HSC). He graduated from the prestigious University of Lagos, Akoka where he studied Applied Physics Electronics and a Master's in Business Administration (MBA) from the Ladoke Akintola University of Technology, Ogbomosho.

== Political life ==
Adefiranye was a Member of the Governing Council of Federal Polytechnic, Oko, Anambra State between May 2017 and March 2019.

In 2019, Adefiranye contested and won the election to represent the Ileoluji/Okeigbo State Constituency in the Ondo State House of Assembly on the platform of the All Progressives Congress(APC). At the State Assembly, he was the Deputy Chief Whip and Chairman of House Committee on Public Accounts and Human Capital Developments.

In 2022, he expressed interest in contesting the House of Representative Election to represent the Ile-Oluji/ Okeigbo/Odigbo Federal Constituency in the February 25, 2023 National Assembly Elections on the platform of the All Progressives Congress (APC). He was declared the winner of the election by the Independent National Electoral Commission (INEC).

=== Bills and Motions Moved ===
Festus Ayodele Adefiranye has sponsored and moved motions since his inauguration as a Member of the House of Representatives in the 10th Nigeria National Assembly. One of such motions include, '' A Need for Rehabilitation and Dualization of Ore-Ondo-Akure Federal Road."

Others are, " Fuel Tanker Explosion At Ore In Odigbo Local Government Of Ondo State That Claimed 30 Lives" and "The Need for Immediate Completion Of The Okeigbo – Igbo Olodumare Power Project In Ile Oluji/ Okeigbo Local Government Area of Ondo State."

On October 25, 2023, Adefiranye sponsored a bill for an "Act To Provide For The Establishment Of The Federal College Of Nursing And Midwifery Okeigbo, Ondo State."

== Personal life ==
Festus Ayodele Adefiranye is married with children.

== Awards and recognitions ==
Adefiranye has won several awards including Excellent Service Award by The International Association of Lions Clubs (Ikeja Metro Lions Club, District 404-2), One Star Fellow by Lions Club District 404B-2, Okeigbo Man Of The Year (2006) by Okeigbo Day Celebration, Distinguished Ambassador (2006) by Okeigbo Grammar School Golden Jubillee, Philanthropist Award (2010) by Okesa Youth Association and Merit Award (2014) by National Association of Okeigbo Student among others.
