= Aderemi =

Surname

Adérẹ̀mí
- Language: Yoruba

Origin
- Origin: Nigerian
- Meaning: The crown comforts me
- Region of origin: South West Nigeria

Other names
- Variant form: Adérẹ̀mílẹ́kún

Adérẹ̀mí is a Nigerian surname and given name of Yoruba origin, which means "The crown comforts me.". Adérẹ̀mí is a variant form of Adérẹ̀mílẹ́kún which means (the crown stops my cry.).

== Notable people with the surname ==
- Adesoji Aderemi (1889–1980), Nigerian politician and traditional ruler.
- Adewunmi Aderemi, Nigerian women's basketball coach.

== See also ==
- Adeyemi
