= Simeon Toluwani Borokini =

Nigerian politician

Whip of the Ondo State House of Assembly
- Incumbent
- Assumed office 2019- present
- Constituency: Akure Constituency 1

Member, Ondo State House of Assembly

Personal details
- Born: Akure, Ondo State, Nigeria
- Party: All Progressive Congress (APC)
- Education: Obafemi Awolowo University
- Occupation: Legislator, businessman
- Website: http://simeontoluwaniborokini.com.ng/

Simeon Toluwani Borokini is a Nigerian public speaker, politician and humanitarian. He is a member and Whip of the Ondo State House of Assembly representing Akure South Constituency 1.

== Early life ==
His parents were Rt. Reverend and Mrs. Simeon Oluwole Borokini. He was born in the year 1986 in Akure South Local Government of Ondo State. He attended Annunciation Nursery and Primary School and Bishop Falope Memorial Day Care Nursery and Primary School in Akure. Toluwani proceeded to St. Matthias Anglican High School in Akure and earned a Diploma in Computer Data Processing before attending Adeyemi College of Education to study English. He furthered his education at Obafemi Awolowo University, Osun State, where he studied English at Masters Level.

== Career ==
Early in his career, Borokini worked as an assistant supervising manager, hall manager, and logistics manager in various organizations.

In 2008, he became managing director and Chief Responsibility Officer of Utopian Events.

He is a professional event consultant.

=== Politics ===
Borokini represents Akure South Constituency 1 at the Ondo State house of assembly. He has been involved in various Ondo State elections. In 2019 he won the Ondo Assembly election to represent Akure South constituency 1. He was the second youngest lawmaker in the 9th Assembly, running on the All Progressives Congress platform. He served as Whip of the legislative house. He is Chairman of the House Committee on Education, Science, and Technology. He is a member of various Assembly committees.
