= Adesina =

Adéṣínà is a surname of Yoruba origin which literally translates to: "the crown or royalty opens the way (forward)". The name is often given to a long-awaited child (following barrenness). Notable people with this surname include:

- Akinwumi Adesina (born 1960), President of the African Development Bank
- Dapo Lam Adesina (born 1978), Nigerian politician, member of Nigeria's 8th House of Representatives
- Femi Adesina, Nigerian journalist and government official, the special adviser on media and publicity to President Muhammadu Buhari
- Lam Adesina (1939–2012), Nigerian educator, governor of Oyo State
- Samuel Adesina Gbadebo (1908–1971), Nigerian traditional monarch
- Samuel Adesina (1958/9–2014), Nigerian politician and Speaker of the Ondo State House of Assembly
- Sikiru Adesina (1971–2016), Nigerian film actor, director and producer
- Olutayo Adesina, Nigerian professor of history

== See also ==
- Adeshina
