= Speaker of the Ondo State House of Assembly =

Presiding officer of the Ondo State House of Assembly, Nigeria

- Incumbent; Olamide Oladiji since 4 June 2023
- Legislative Branch of the Ondo State Government
- Style: Mr Speaker (informal); The Right Honourable (formal)
- Member of: Ondo State House of Assembly
- Seat: Ondo State House of Assembly Complex, Akure
- Appointer: Indirect House Election
- Term length: 4 years renewable
- Constituting instrument: Constitution of Nigeria
- Formation: 2 October 1979; 46 years ago
- Succession: Second
- Deputy: Deputy Speaker of the Ondo State House of Assembly

The speaker of the Ondo State House of Assembly is the presiding officer of the Ondo State House of Assembly, elected by its membership. The Speaker is second in line of succession to the Ondo State governorship, after the deputy governor. The current Speaker is Rt. Hon. Olamide Oladiji who was elected on 4 June 2023.

== Powers and duties ==
The speaker's statutory duty is to preside over the sitting and deliberations of the Assembly but the Deputy Speaker can preside in the absence of the Speaker. The Speaker also represents the voters of his or her constituency.

== See also ==
- Ondo State Government House
