= Philip Emeagwali =

Nigerian computer scientist

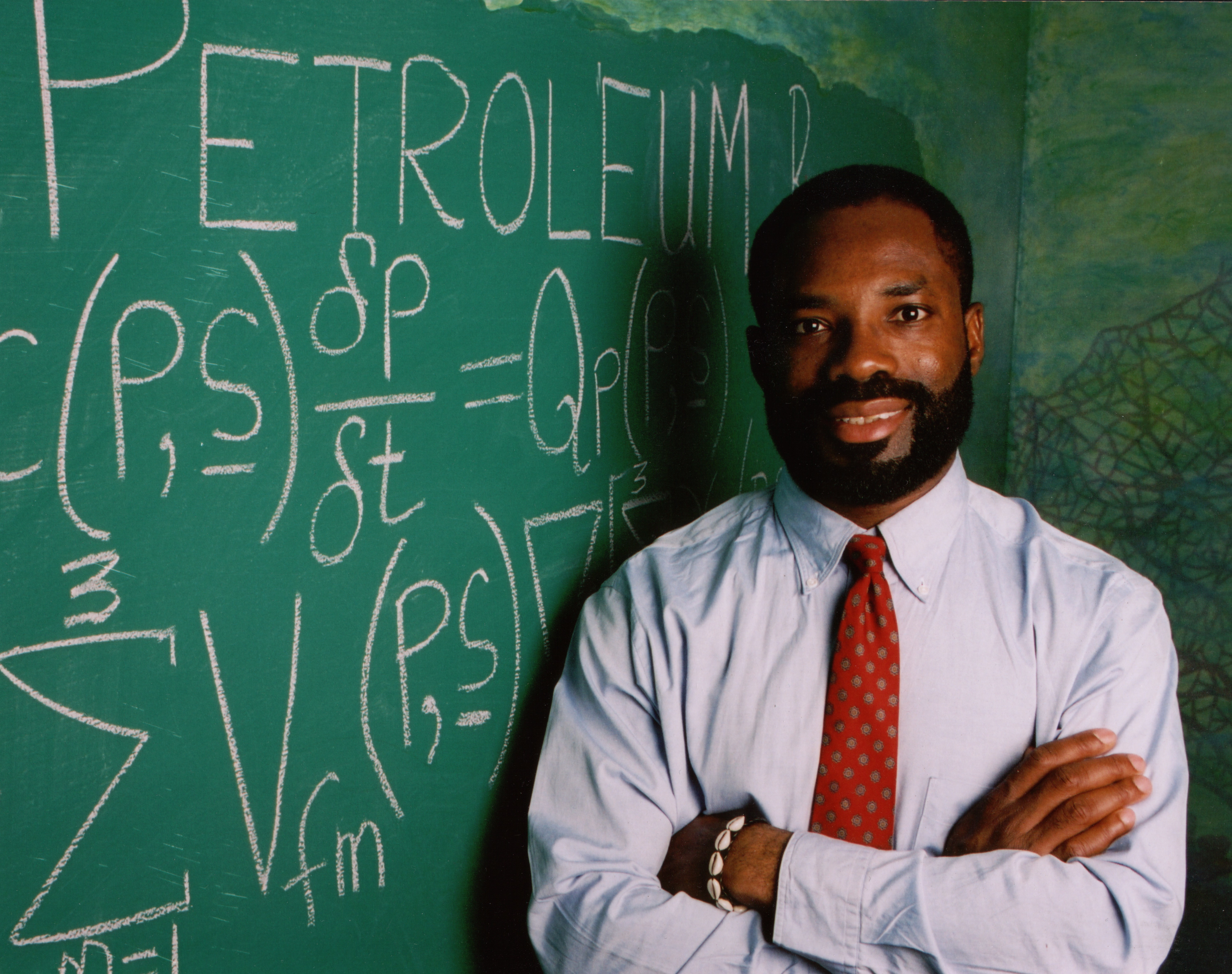
- Born: 23 August 1954 (age 72); Akure, Colonial Nigeria From Onitsha, Anambra State
- Education: George Washington University School of Engineering and Applied Science; Oregon State University
- Scientific career
- Fields: Computer science

Philip Emeagwali (born 23 August 1954) is a Nigerian computer scientist. He is known for making highly controversial statements about his achievements, such as inventing the Internet and creating the world's fastest computer, the Connection Machine, which are disputed by the scientific community.

== Biography ==
Philip Emeagwali was born in Akure, Nigeria on 23 August 1954. He was raised in Onitsha in the South Eastern part of Nigeria. His early schooling was suspended in 1967 as a result of the Nigerian Civil War. At age 13, he worked in the Biafran army. After the war he completed high-school equivalence through self-study.

Later on he married Dale Brown Emeagwali, an African-American microbiologist.

== Education ==
He traveled to the United States to study under a scholarship following completion of a course at the University of London. He received a bachelor's degree in mathematics from Oregon State University in 1977. He later moved to Washington D.C., receiving in 1986 a master's degree from George Washington University in ocean and marine engineering, and a second master's in applied mathematics from the University of Maryland. Next magazine suggested that Emeagwali claimed to have further degrees. During this time, he worked as a civil engineer at the Bureau of Land Reclamation in Wyoming.

=== Court case and the denial of degree ===
Emeagwali studied for a Ph.D. degree from the University of Michigan from 1987 through 1991. His thesis was not accepted by a committee of internal and external examiners and thus he was not awarded the degree. Emeagwali filed a court challenge, stating that the decision was a violation of his civil rights and that the university had discriminated against him in several ways because of his race. The court challenge was dismissed, as was an appeal to the Michigan state Court of Appeals.

== "Supercomputing" ==
In 1989, Emeagwali won the $1000 Gordon Bell Prize for an application of the CM-2 massively-parallel computer. The application used computational fluid dynamics for oil-reservoir modeling. He received a prize in "price/performance" category, with a performance figure of about 400 Mflops/$1M. The winner in the "performance" category was also the winner of the Price/performance category, but unable to receive two prizes: Mobil Research and Thinking Machines used the CM-2 for seismic data processing and achieved the higher ratio of 500 Mflops/$1M. The judges decided on one award per entry. His method involved each microprocessor communicating with six neighbors.

Emeagwali's simulation was the first program to apply a pseudo-time approach to reservoir modeling. He was cited by Bill Clinton as an example of what Nigerians can achieve when given the opportunity and is frequently featured in popular press articles for Black History Month.

== Debunked controversial claims ==
Emeagwali has made several controversial claims about his achievements that are widely disputed by the scientific community and journalists.

His claims of being a father of the Internet, of having invented the Connection Machine, of possessing 41 patented inventions, of winning "the Nobel Prize of Computing" and of being a "doctor" and/or "professor" have been conclusively debunked with widely documented evidence. Speaking during a visit to Switzerland in April 2009, Mr. Emeagwali said he was the first to program a hypercube "to solve a grand challenge defined as the 20 gold-ring problems in computing. That discovery, in part, inspired the reinvention of supercomputers as an Internet." He claimed that by his effort, he was able to set three world records and improve on Newton's second law of motion.

Though he self-identifies as "Prof Emeagwali" or "Dr Emeagwali", he is neither a professor nor a PhD. Emeagwali did not complete the Ph.D. that he started at the University of Michigan. Inquiries from the university showed that he failed his Ph.D. qualifying exams twice and wrote a doctoral dissertation that fell short of the standards of the Graduate School. He was therefore not awarded the Ph.D. He filed a racial discrimination suit against the university, but it was thrown out for lack of merit. Investigation found out that he has never published in any peer-reviewed journal, nor owned any patent—all contrary to his claims.. In some Nigerian schools his work his exaggerated and he is falsely called the father of the internet.

== Accolades ==
- Price/performance–1989 Gordon Bell Prize, IEEE ($1,000 prize)

== Selected publications ==
- Emeagwali, P. (2003). How do we reverse the brain drain. Speech given at Pan-African Conference on Brain Drain, Elsah, Illinois USA.
- Emeagwali, P. (1997). Can Nigeria leapfrog into the information age. In World Igbo Congress. New York: August.
