= Oluwole Adegboro =

Nigerian politician

Oluwole Adefila Adegboro
- Olúwọlé Adéfilá Adégbọrò

Ondo State Ministry of Information and Orientation
- In office 2000–2001
- Appointed by: Adebayo Adefarati
- Governor: Adebayo Adefarati

Personal details
- Born: 1948 Akure
- Died: 27 July 2022(aged 73) Akure, Ondo State
- Citizenship: Nigeria
- Occupation: Politician

Oluwole Emmanuel Adegboro (1948 – 27 July 2022) was a Nigerian politician who served as a former commissioner of information and orientation in Ondo State from 2000–2001 during the Adebayo Adefarati government.

== Career ==
Oluwole became active in politics in 1971 when he was elected National President of the National Union of Nigerian Students, serving until 1972. During the same period, at the height of student mobilisation across the continent, he became the first Continental President of the All-Africa Students Union.

=== Military and academic administration ===
Oluwole was commissioned into the Nigerian Army in 1974 and served in the Army Education Corps, and obtained the rank of Captain before retiring in1978. After leaving military service he moved into tertiary institution administration, holding positions at the Federal Polytechnic, Ado-Ekiti, and at the Federal University of Technology, Akure (FUTA), where he served in senior administrative roles including deputy registrar and as a member of the institution's governing council.

=== Political passage ===
His political activity spanned several decades and party affiliations. During the Second Nigerian Republic he was associated with the Unity Party of Nigeria (UPN) and later aligned with the All Progressives Congress (APC). He was one of the 566 delegates to the National Constituent Assembly that began work on 11 May 1988 and took part in party-formation efforts associated with that process, serving as national vice chairman of the Liberal Convention in the late 1980s. At the state level in Ondo State he held appointments, including Special Adviser to Ondo State Governor on Education & Special Duties from August 1999 and June 2000, Commissioner for Information and Orientation from 2000 to 2001, Commissioner Ministry of Commerce and Industry between June 2001 and May 2003. He also contributed to the relocation of Adekunle Ajasin University to Akungba Akoko.

== Personal life ==
Oluwole belonged to the Osupa/Odundun royal family of Akure.

== Death ==
Oluwole Emmanuel Adefila Adegboro died on Wednesday, 27 July 2022, in Akure, Ondo State, at the age of 73.
