= Ayodele =

- Gender: Male
- Language: Yoruba

Origin
- Origin: Nigeria
- Meaning: Joy comes home
- Region of origin: South western Nigeria

Ayodele or Ayodelé audio is a Yoruba name meaning "joy arrived home"

Notable people with the name include:

- Francis Morgan Ayodele Thompson (born 1958), British decathlete
- Ayodele Adeleye (born 1988), Nigerian football defender
- Ayodele Aladefa (born 1970), Nigerian former long jumper
- Sylvester Ayodele Arise, Nigerian senator who represents the People's Democratic Party (PDP) in Ekiti State
- Ayodele Awojobi (1937–1984), Nigerian academic, author, inventor, social crusader and activist
- Akin Ayodele (born 1979), former American football linebacker
- Franklin Ayodele (born 1987), Nigerian football striker
- Remi Ayodele (born 1983), former American football defensive tackle
- Ayodele Bakare (born 1960), Nigerian professional basketball coach
- Saidu Ayodele Balogun, the first Governor of Ogun State, Nigeria after it was formed in March 1976
- Ayodele Fayose (born 1960), former governor of Ekiti State in Nigeria
- M. Ayodele Heath, American poet, spoken-word performer, and fiction writer
- Ayodelé Ikuesan (born 1985), French sprinter who specialises in the 60 metres and 4x100 metres relay
- Stephen Ayodele Makinwa (born 1983), Nigerian football striker

== See also ==
- Dele
