= Adeyemi =

Adéyẹmí
- Gender: Unisex
- Language: Yoruba

Origin
- Origin: Nigerian
- Meaning: the crown or royalty befits me
- Region of origin: South-West Nigeria

Adéyẹmí is a Yoruba name that means the crown or royalty befits me. It could also mean crown is meant for me. The popular Yorùbá prefix "Adé" which means "Crown" is typically reserved for people born into any Yorùbá royal family.

== Notable people with the name ==
=== Given name ===
- Adeyemi Abayomi, Nigerian boxer
- Adeyemi Afolahan, Nigerian Navy admiral
- Adeyemi Afolayan, Nigerian actor
- Adeyemi I Alowolodu, last ruler of the Oyo Empire
- Adeyemi Ikuforiji, Nigerian politician
- Adeyemi Olayemi, Nigerian politician

=== Surname ===
- Karim Adeyemi, German footballer
- Kunlé Adeyemi, Nigerian architect
- Tobi Adeyemi, also known as Tobi Lou, American musician
- Tom Adeyemi, English footballer
- Tomi Adeyemi, American author
- Walé Adeyemi, British fashion designer

== See also ==
- Adeyemo
