= Crest FM =

Akure and Ibadan; Nigeria
- Broadcast area: Alagbaka, Akure, Ondo State and Galilee Bus stop, Olodo, Ibadan
- Frequencies: 106.1MHz& 91.1fm

Programming
- Languages: English, Yoruba

Ownership
- Owner: Olumide Origunloye

History
- First air date: 2020

Links
- Website: crest1061fm.com

Crest FM operating as an arm of Cresthills Media Group currently has two radio stations situated at Alagbaka, Akure, Ondo State, Nigeria (106.1fm) and Galilee bus stop, Olodo, Ibadan(91.1fm). The radio stations were founded on April 6, 2020 and Feb 6, 2023 respectively. Its Group Chief Operating Officer is Mr. Adeolu Gboyega.

== History ==
Crest FM has been adjudged as one of the fastest growing radio stations in South West, Nigeria not just for its reach and good signal quality but creating positive disruptions in the media space with its programming. In Ondo State for instance, Crest fm houses 80% of the most popular broadcasters in the State thereby making it the listeners and advertisers choice always. In its three years of operations, it has grown to the top of the MPS chart and has recently extended its operations to Oyo State with the establishment of Crest 91.1fm, Ibadan.
