= Campbell Ajiye =

Nigerian photojournalist (born 1981)

- Born: Campbell Olajide Ajiye; 29 September 1981 (age 45); Akure, Ondo State, Nigeria
- Occupation: Fashion designer
- Website: amsmbofficial.com

Campbell Olajide Ajiye (born 29 September 1981) is a Nigerian photojournalist, musician, and fashion designer. He is founder of Alpha Money Self Made Billionaires Apparel (Amsmb) brand in Lagos, Atlanta and New York respectively, an international fashion brand.

== Early life ==
Ajiye was born in the city of Akure, Ondo State, Nigeria on 29 September 1981, and grew up in Akure where he had his primary school education at St. Finbarr's Primary School, Akure, and went to the C.A.C Grammar School for his secondary education before going to obtain his ordinary National Diploma certificate from The Polytechnic of Ibadan. In 2016, Ajiye move to the United States where he went on to study fashion and Art at the Savannah college of Art and Design, SCAD Atlanta Georgia.

== Career ==
=== Photography career ===
Ajiye move to Lagos and started assisting a townsman in his photography business at a Sweet Sensation fast food outlet at Opebi Allen, Ikeja, Lagos State who also taught him the art of photography. Ajiye was later employed as an official photographer for a reputable magazine Society International Magazine which was owned by a UK based entrepreneur, he later went on to work as a reporter and photojournalist for Reality International Magazine which gave him much exposure and networks in the fashion world both locally and internationally and he had the opportunity to work with local and international celebrities as a photographer before quitting the profession.

=== Music career ===
Ajiye began a career in Music with a stage name AJ Campbell after quitting job as a photojournalist, and worked with top artists and producers in the Nigerian Music industry like OJB Jezreel, ID Cabassa, Mr. Daz, Sheyman, K-Solo and Puffy Tee to release some notable hit songs and was featured at several music concerts along with Top music artists. His music career didn't last long because of a new career he found in the fashion industry.

=== Fashion industry ===
In 2011 while in Egypt, Ajiye was inspired to launch his fashion brand The Alpha Money Self Made Billionaires (AMSMB) which was inspired by the Gianni Versace, Bevista, Roberto Cavalli and Louis Vuitton. The brand became a registered brand in USA when Ajiye moved into US in 2016 and has since gained local and international attention and patronage on the brands website which was launched in 2016.
