= Akindele =

- Gender: Male
- Language: Yoruba

Origin
- Origin: Nigeria
- Meaning: Valor has arrived home.
- Region of origin: South West, Nigeria

Akíndélé is a Nigerian given and surname of Yoruba origin, typically bestowed upon males. It means "Valor has arrived home.". Akíndélé is a unique and culturally significant name and primarily used among the families of Akín also known as warriors.

== Notable individuals with the name ==
- Deji Akindele (born 1983), Nigerian basketball player.
- Funke Akindele (born 1976), Nigerian actress.
- Seun Akindele, Nigerian actor.
- Tesho Akindele (born 1992), Canadian soccer player.
- Bode Akindele (1933 – 2020), Nigerian industrialist and business magnate.
- Andrew Akindele (born 2000) Nigerian American soccer player.
- Jumoke Akindele, Nigerian lawyer and politician.
- Bola Akindele (born 1963), Nigerian entrepreneur, business strategist and philanthropist.
- Oyeronke Akindele (born 1946), Nigerian sprinter.
