= Ralph Alabi =

Nigerian engineer and industrialist (1941–2009)

- Born: 14 April 1941; Akure, Ondo State, Nigeria
- Died: 11 November 2009 (aged 68); Ikeja, Lagos State
- Resting place: Akure, Ondo State
- Education: City and Guild of London Certificate, OND, BSc. St. Joseph's College Ondo, Hendon College, UK
- Occupations: Engineer, Industrialist, businessman, Pastor
- Years active: 1961–2009
- Employer: Guinness Nigeria
- Organization(s): Nigeria Society of Engineers, Manufacturers association of Nigeria, Akure Inner Circle, Oyemekun Progressive Union
- Title: Engr, Doctor
- Spouse: Rachael Oluwayemisi Alabi (Late)
- Children: Olufunmilayo Alabi, Adekunle Alabi, Adeniyi Alabi, Folaranmi Masha, Yetunde McEwen, Olusayo Alabi, Adenike Alabi

Raphael Adeola Alabi OON, Fellow of NSE (1941–2009) was a Nigerian engineer and industrialist. He hailed from the City of Akure, Ondo State, and he was the first indigenous engineer in post colonial Nigeria to become a 'Chief Engineer' at Guinness, Nigeria. Altogether he spent 45 years at Guinness, including 13 years as the chairman.

== Early life ==
Ralph was born to a traditional Akure family, and was, as documented in his book, related to the royal Adesida Family of Akure. He lived with his great-grandmother, Eyelori (Queen) Faromibi Adesida, one of the wives of Oba Afunbiowo Adesida (former Deji of Akure), until he was 16 years of age.

After primary school in 1956, Ralph Alabi attended St. Joseph's College, Ondo (1957–1961), where he received a scholarship from the Akure District Council. After receiving an ordinary diploma in mechanical engineering at the technical college, Ibadan (now Ibadan Polytechnic) and the City and Guild of London Certificate, Ralph enrolled at the Hendon College of Technology in London (now Middlesex University) on a Guinness scholarship on an HND programme, but was later transferred to a degree class due to high performance. He subsequently graduated with a Bachelor of Science degree in Mechanical Engineering.

== Professional career ==
Ralph began his career in Guinness Nigeria Plc as a Technical Trainee in 1964 and rose through the ranks to become the Chairman of Guinness Nigeria Plc. He was also very active in other professional circles, and later founded his own engineering consultancy company.

=== Guinness Nigeria ===
Having earlier earned a Diploma in Mechanical Engineering from the Technical College, Ibadan (now Ibadan Polytechnic), where he graduated as the best engineering student, he was employed by Guinness as a 'Trainee' and rose through the ranks to become the first Nigerian Chief Engineer in 1979. He was subsequently Executive Director in 1986, marketing director 1988 and was managing director Chief Executive, and vice-chairman between 1994 and 1996. Ralph Alabi's journey at Guinness ended with him spending up to 13 years as the chairman (Non-Executive) in 2009.

=== Taïjo Wonukabe ===
Ralph Adeola Alabi was the chairman of a marketing communications firm known as Taijo Wonukabe Limited. Alabi brought to the business of Taijo Wonukabe his experience in management and corporate governance.

=== Maystar Brothers Ltd ===
After an illustrious career with Guinness, Ralph Alabi decided to set an engineering consultancy business – a company christened Maystar Brothers Ltd. In the seventh chapter of his second publication (Second Diamond Chronicle, 2001), Ralph explained the reason for his company name by describing what he called "The May factor" using some of the following points:

- Married, May 1967
- Promoted to Assistant Chief Engineer, May 1972
- Promoted Chief Engineer, May 1979
- Promoted to general manager, May 1985
- Appointed Deputy M.D, May 1991

== Honours and memberships ==
Ralph Alabi was a member of several business and professional organisations such as COREN. In 1990, he was given the chieftaincy title of Aruwajoye of Akure, and honoured with a National merit award - Officer of Order of the Niger (OON) - in 2003 by the Obansanjo government. The Federal University of Technology of Akure on 11 December 2005, conferred on him the award of doctorate degree (Honoris Causa) Doctor of Engineering. He was a National Vice-Chairman of Science, Engineering and Technology Summit of the Federal Ministry of Science and Technology. He was also a member of the Governing Council of Lagos State Polytechnic.

=== Manufacturers Association of Nigeria ===
Ralph was a former chairman of the Manufacturers Association of Nigeria (MAN), Ikeja Branch, and the Finance and Establishment Committee Chairman of MAN National Council.

=== Nigeria Society of Engineers ===
Ralph was also a fellow of the Nigerian Society of Engineers (NSE).

== Personal life and death ==
Alabi married Rachael Alabi (née Oluwafemi) while studying in the UK, and they had three of their seven children there before returning to Nigeria in 1969. Since 1964, Alabi was employed at Guinness in several capacities until three months before his death, and sat as the head of many organisations through the course of his life. He lived mainly in Lagos, but spent substantial periods of his life at his hometown, Akure.

A statement from the family spokesperson and daughter of the late former Guinness head, Mrs. Yetunde McEwen, said he died at his Ikeja GRA, Lagos home on Wednesday, 11 November 2009. The late Alabi devoted his last days to the service of God as a pastor of the Merciful God Ministry. He left behind many children and grandchildren, and a legion of individuals from all walks of life who sought his counsel on various facets of life: spiritual, entrepreneurship, management, alumni relations, discipline and family.
