= Adeshina =

- Gender: Male
- Language: Yoruba

Origin
- Origin: Nigeria
- Meaning: crown opens the way
- Region of origin: Southwest Nigeria

Adeshina audio is both a surname and a given name from the Yoruba ethnic group of West Africa. It means "crown opens the way."

== Notable individuals with the names ==
- Adeshina Lawal (born 1984), Nigerian footballer
- Ademola Adeshina (born 1964), Nigerian footballer
- Saidu Adeshina (born 1983), Nigerian footballer

== See also ==
- Adesina
