= Adeyemo =

- Gender: Male
- Language: Yoruba

Origin
- Origin: Nigeria
- Meaning: the crown or royalty befits a child
- Region of origin: South western Nigeria

Adéyẹmọ is a Yoruba given name and surname meaning "the crown or royalty befits a child." People with this name include:

Given name

- Adeyemo Alakija (1884–1952), Nigerian lawyer, politician and businessman
- Adeyemo Fatai, Nigerian former table tennis player

Surname

- Adebowale A. Adeyemo, Nigerian physician-scientist and genetic epidemiologist
- Adewale Wally Adeyemo (born 1981), Obama Foundation President and Biden Administration Deputy Treasury Secretary
- Alhaji Abdul Azeez Kolawole Adeyemo (1941–2002), Nigerian Yoruba politician
- Ola Adeyemo (born 1995), Nigerian footballer
- Olanike Adeyemo (born 1970), Nigerian professor of Veterinary Public Health and Preventive Medicine at University of Ibadan

== See also ==
- Adeyemi
