= Harry Garuba =

Nigerian poet and professor (1958–2020)

- Born: Harry Olúdáre Garuba; 8 April 1958; Akure, Ondo State, Nigeria
- Died: 28 February 2020 (aged 61)
- Education: University of Ibadan
- Occupations: Poet; Critic; Academic
- Years active: 2001—2020

Harry Olúdáre Garuba (6 April 1958 – 28 February 2020) was a Nigerian-born writer of poetry and a professor of African Studies and English at the University of Cape Town.

== Biography ==
Garuba was born 8 April 1958 in Akure, southwest Nigeria. At 17 he was accepted to study English at a southwestern Nigeria university, the University of Ibadan. He graduated with a BA honours degree and continued to earn his master's degree. In 1988 he graduated from the same university with his PhD. After getting his degree, he taught at Ibadan for fifteen years before finally emigrating to South Africa to teach at the University of Zululand's English department. In 2001, he moved to the University of Cape Town where he would teach until 2019. While at the University of Cape Town, Garuba published heavily in the fields of Africa and post colonial literature.

Garuba was a professor at the University of Cape Town, with a joint appointment in the English Department and the Centre for African Studies. He was also a member of the Heinemann African Writers Series editorial advisory board. Garuba mainly focused in African and postcolonial literatures. Garuba served as the acting dean of the Faculty of Humanities. He died from leukemia on 28 February 2020.

== Publications ==
In 1982, Garuba published his first collection of poetry, Shadow and dream and other poems. At 24, he was considered one of Nigeria's most outstanding poets. This collection was the first runner up for the inaugural Okigbo Award in 1987, established by Wole Soyinka in honour of Christopher Okigbo (the winner was Jean-Baptiste Tati Loutard's La Tradition du Songe. In 2017 he published his second collection, Animist Chants and Memorials: Poems. This collection was divided up in three parts, and included personal reflections, historical paradoxes and dialogues.
