= Adeyemi Olayemi =

Nigerian politician and educational administrator

Dr. Adeyemi Olayemi

Chief Whip of the Ondo State House of Assembly
- Incumbent
- Assumed office 2019
- Constituency: Owo Constituency 2

Member, Ondo State House of Assembly
- Incumbent
- Assumed office 2019

Personal details
- Born: April 6, 1974 (age 52) Lagos state
- Party: All Progressive Congress (APC)
- Relations: Married
- Education: University of Calabar
- Occupation: Legislator, Businessman
- Website: https://dradeyemiolayemi.com.ng/

Dr. Adeyemi Olayemi ‌was born in Lagos on 6 April 1970s. He is currently a member and chief whip of the Ondo State House of Assembly. He is also the President/Founder of The West African Union University and Pecox Global Limited.

== Early life ==
He was born in Kano state, Nigeria. He had his primary education at African Church Primary School Ipaja, Lagos before he proceeded to Lishabi Grammar School, Abeokuta, Ogun state where he obtained the West Africa School Certificate. He studied marketing and graduated at Ibadan Polytechnic between 1994–1999. He completed his PGDE programme in the University of Calabar and proceeded immediately for his M.Ed in Education Administration and Planning from the University of Calabar which he completed in 2007. He bagged Doctor of Leadership from Institute of Humanistic Science, Missouri USA in 2014.

== Political career ==
He won the 2019 Owo Constituency 2 of the Ondo State House of Assembly under the platform of the All Progressives Congress, the office he occupies at the moment, He also serves as the chief whip of the legislative house. He was formerly a member of the Board of National Arts and Gallery, Nigeria.

== Koko Adeyemi Foundation ==
Koko Adeyemi Foundation (KAF) was founded on April 6, 2015, and officially established on October 4, 2016, by Adeyemi Olayemi. the trustee of the foundation includes the Ondo State Governor, Rotimi Akeredolu SAN, and King Benjamin Ikechuwu, the Dein of Agbor.
