= Abayomi Akinruntan =

Nigerian politician

Member Ondo State House of Assembly
- In office 2015–2027
- Constituency: Ilaje Constituency 1

Deputy Speaker of Ondo State House of Assembly
- Incumbent
- Assumed office 2015

Personal details
- Born: October 21, 1973 (age 53)
- Party: All Progressive Congress (APC)
- Relations: Married
- Parent: King Fredrick Obateru Akinruntan (father)
- Education: Olabisi Onabanjo University
- Occupation: Legislator, Businessman
- Website: http://abakinruntan.com/

Prince Abayomi Babatunde Akinruntan, born October 21, 1973, is a businessman, politician and currently, a member and parliamentary secretary of the Ondo State House of Assembly representing Ilaje constituency 1.

== Early life and education ==
Abayomi is the son of King Fredrick Obateru Akinruntan, a wealthy traditional ruler in Ugbo Kingdom, a town in Ilaje Local Government, Ondo State, Nigeria. He started his education at the Sacred Heart Nursery/Primary School in Ibadan and proceeded to Command Secondary School, both in Ibadan, he began his tertiary education at the Polytechnic, Ibadan, where he read Art and Design and bagged a National Diploma in 1995. Prince Abayomi also holds an LL.B {Hons} in Law from the former Ogun State University (Now Olabisi Onabanjo University).

== Business and personal life ==
Prince Abayomi was actively involved in the day-to-day operations of Obat Oil and Petroleum Limited, one of Nigeria's major indigenous Oil Companies and in 2001, he became the Operations Manager of Obat Oil, overseeing the operations and logistics at the company's Head Office and Service Outlets in Ibadan.

Prince Abayomi Babatunde Akinruntan is the Director, Operations for Febson Hotel Nigeria Ltd, an Ultra-Modern Facility in Abuja and is affiliated with firms including Prince Aando Nigeria Limited (Oil and Gas), Bellefull Integrated Resources Limited, Aando Apartments (Hotels and Towers), De Ark Entertainment and Records and 2110 Oil and Gas. In 2011, he was appointed Group Executive Director, Operations, Obat Group and the Ondo State pioneer coordinator for Nigeria Content Development & Monitoring Board (NCDMB) office in Yenegoa before he ventured into active politics in Ondo State.

Abayomi is happily married to Olamide and the union is blessed with children.

== Politics ==
Abayomi started active politics in 2011 when he contested for the Nigerian House of Representatives but was denied ticket under the Labour Party and In 2015, Prince Abayomi Akinruntan contested and won the 2015 Ondo State House of Assembly election. After his first 4 years in the legislative house, he decamped from the PDP to the APC on April 17, 2017 and was reelected as member, Ondo State House of Assembly in 2020 under the All Progressive Congress.
