= Olamide Oladiji =

Speaker of the 10th Ondo State Nigeria House of Assembly

Olamide Adesanmi Oladiji known as Landmark is a Nigerian politician currently serving as the speaker of the 10th Ondo State House of Assembly since June 2023. A member of the All Progressives Congress (APC), he is representing Ilaje Constituency 1, Ondo East constituency. He was nominated for the speakership position by Temitope Akomolafe of the APC representing Ifedore constituency and seconded by Abiola Oladapo also of the APC representing Ondo West II.

== Early life and education ==
Olamide Oladiji was born to the popular Oladiji family in Toribo community Ondo East Local Government Area, Ondo State. He attended St. Paul's R. C. M Primary School, Yaba Ondo, for his first school leaving certificate and St. Joseph's College, Ondo, where he passed his West African Senior School Certificate Examination (WASSCE). Oladiji studied for an ordinary national diploma in accountancy at the Federal Polytechnic Unwanna, Ebonyi State before proceeding to the Federal Polytechnic, Ado- Ekiti, Ekiti State where earned a Higher National Diploma in Accounting. He holds post graduate diploma in education from Olabisi Onabanjo University, Ago- Iwoye, Ogun State and in theology from Redeemed Christian Church of God.

== Career ==
Oladiji was chairman of Landmark Polytechnic, Itele Ayobo, Ogun State, Dynamic Landmark Group of Schools, Lagos, Lamtex Oil and Gas, Landmark Vocational and Innovative Institute and chairman of Lamtex Hotels and Suites.

== Politics ==
Oladiji joined politics in 2014 and became a member of the newly formed All Progressives Congress (APC). He contested for the Ilaje Constituency 1 seat in the Ondo State Assembly but lost. Oladiji ran again 2019 on the same party ticket and won to the 9th Ondo State Assembly and served as Deputy Majority Leader of the house throughout the session. He was re-elected to the assembly in 2023. Following the proclamation of the governor of the state for the Inauguration of the 10th Ondo State Assembly in June 2023, he was nominated for the speakership position by Temitope Akomolafe of the APC representing Ifedore constituency and seconded by Abiola Oladapo also of the APC representing Ondo West II.
