= West African Union University =

Private university located in Cotonou, Republic of Benin

West African University Benin (WAUB) is a private university located in Cotonou, Republic of Benin. It was established in 2014, having been registered by the Ministry of Higher Education, Republic of Benin. As of 2015, it has some 50 on-campus students from Nigeria and Benin, as well as some 400 distance learning students in Nigeria running various programmes.
