= Karima Rhanem =

Moroccan communication specialist, journalist, social activist

- Born: Hinda; September 29, 1979; Rabat city
- Citizenship: Morocco
- Education: Institute for Leadership and Communication Studies; Mohammed V University of Rabat
- Occupations: Journalist; communication; Social media specialist
- Employer: International Center for Diplomacy
- Awards: September 28, 2019, she received award at the Africa-Europe Youth Leadership Summit in Banjul, Gambia as one of the 30 most influential young leaders in 2019

Karima Rhanem (born September 29, 1979) is a communication and social media specialist, researcher on governance and public policy, journalist and a social activist.

== Early life and education ==
Rhanem was born in Rabat city, the capital of Morocco. She gained a bachelor's degree in Languages & Communications Studies from the Institute for Leadership and Communication Studies (2000–2003), Master of Arts in Governance and Public policy from Mohammed V University of Rabat (2010–2012) and Master of Arts in Journalism from Paris School of Journalism (2018–2019). She is the president of the International Center for Diplomacy and co-founder and Director of Strategic Studies Research of the African Network of Youth Policy Experts.

== Career ==
In 2012, she was nominated as Good Will Ambassador by Morocco World News newspaper for exceptional dedication to Morocco's public diplomacy and exemplary representation of Morocco abroad. Rhanem was appointed by board members of the Pan African Humanitarian Summits and Awards as Ambassador and Country Director for the 4th edition of the event held in Morocco with the theme "Africa is My Home: A call for unity and development (2014). In 2018 she was author of the fifth chapter of the Council of Europe publication Perspectives on youth – Young people in a digitalised world.

== Award ==
On September 28, 2019, she received award at the Africa-Europe Youth Leadership Summit in Banjul, Gambia as one of the 30 most influential young leaders in 2019.
