= Samuel Adesina =

Nigerian politician

- In office May 2011 – February 2014
- Constituency: Odigbo Constituency II

Personal details
- Born: Ondo State, Nigeria
- Party: Labour Party
- Occupation: Lawmaking

Samuel Adesina (1958–59 – February 24, 2014) was a Nigerian politician and former Speaker of the Ondo State House of Assembly.

== Political career ==
In April 2011, he contested the seat of his constituency, Odigbo Constituency II and won on the platform of the Labour Party. On May 29, 2011, he was elected Speaker of the assembly. He served in this capacity for 3 years until he died on February 24, 2014, at the age of 56 from bladder cancer.
