= Otunba Moyinolorun Ogunwumiju =

Nigerian politician

Moyinolorun Taiwo Ogunwumiju

Member Ondo State House of Assembly
- In office 2023–2027
- Constituency: Ondo West Constituency 1

Personal details
- Born: December 1, 1988 (age 37)
- Party: All Progressive Congress (APC)
- Relations: Married
- Education: University of Lagos (UNILAG)
- Occupation: Salesman ,Supply Chain Manager, Legislator

Otunba Moyinolorun Taiwo Ogunwumiju, Born on 1st, December 1988 is a Nigerian politician and member, Ondo State House of Assembly representing Ondo West Constituency 1 He hails from Ondo City in the Ondo West Local Government Area of Ondo State.

== Education ==
He received his secondary school education in Akure and Ibadan before continuing his studies at the University of Lagos (UNILAG), where he pursued graduated with a degree in petroleum and gas engineering. He proceeded to University of Leeds, United Kingdom, where he earned a master's degree in engineering project management.

== Early life ==
He started his professional career at Nigerian Breweries plc. Over the years, he held various roles across multiple brewery locations. In 2021, he assumed the role of supply chain manager at the company's headquarters, overseeing supply chain system operations in all the nine breweries in Nigeria.

he has been actively involved in numerous sustainable development projects and initiatives in Ondo State.

== Politics ==
In March 2023, Otunba Moyinolorun Ogunwumiju contested and won the election as a member of the Ondo State House of Assembly, representing Ondo West Constituency 1. Upon taking office, he was appointed as the parliamentary secretary of the House of Assembly, a principal officer position.
