= Akure =

Capital city of Ondo State, Nigeria

Akure Àkúrẹ́ (Yoruba)
- Capital city
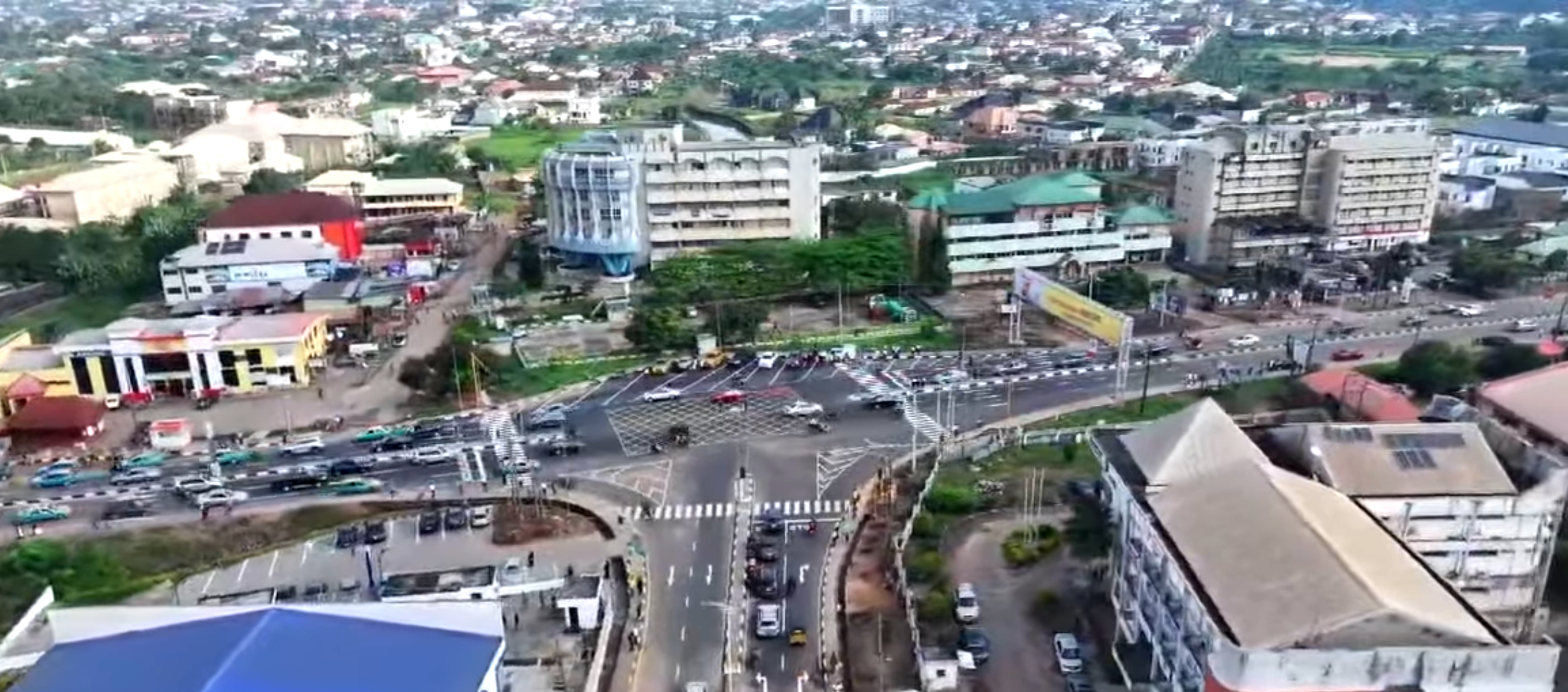
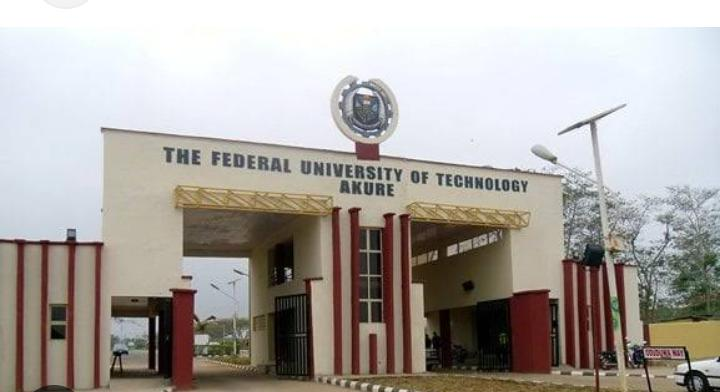
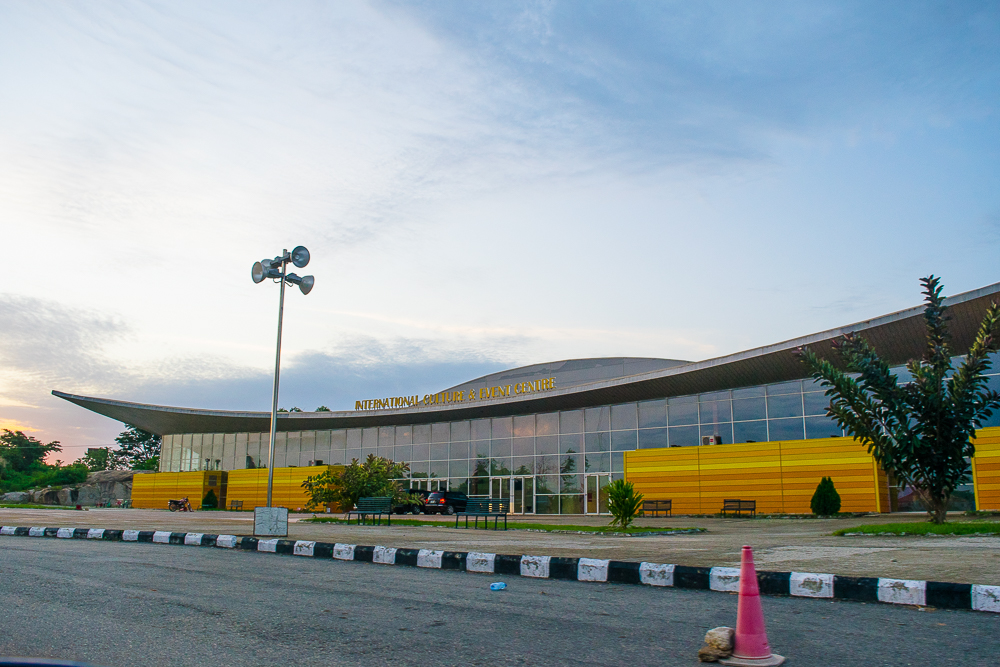
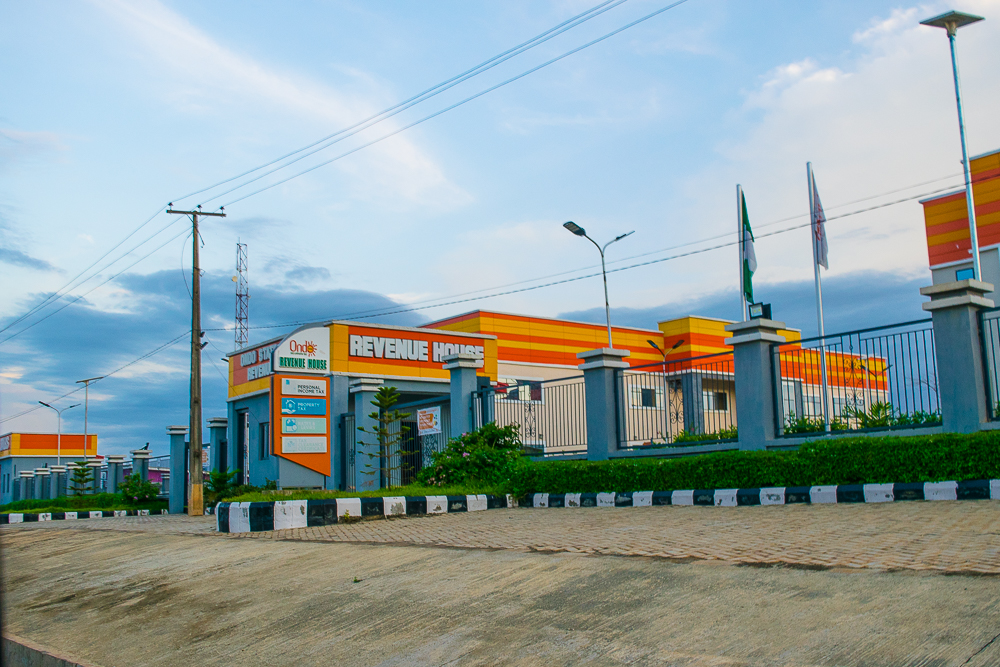
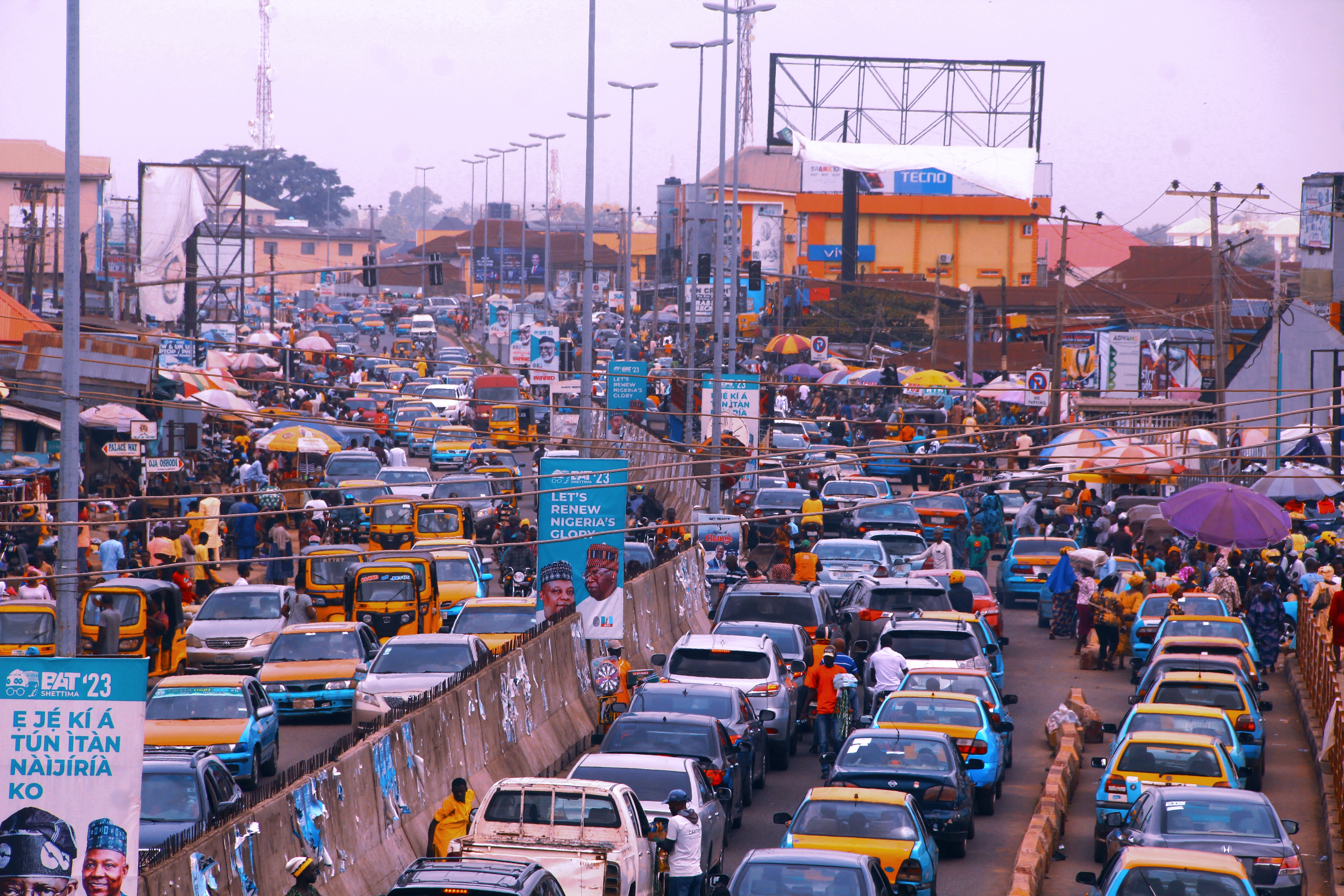
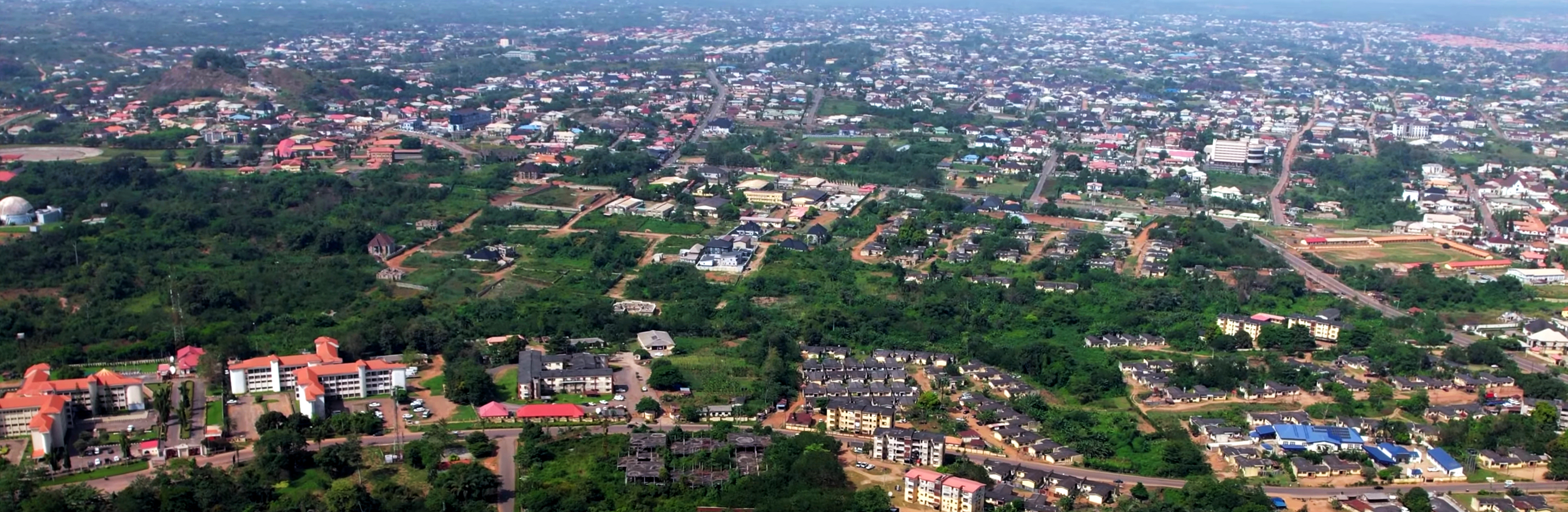
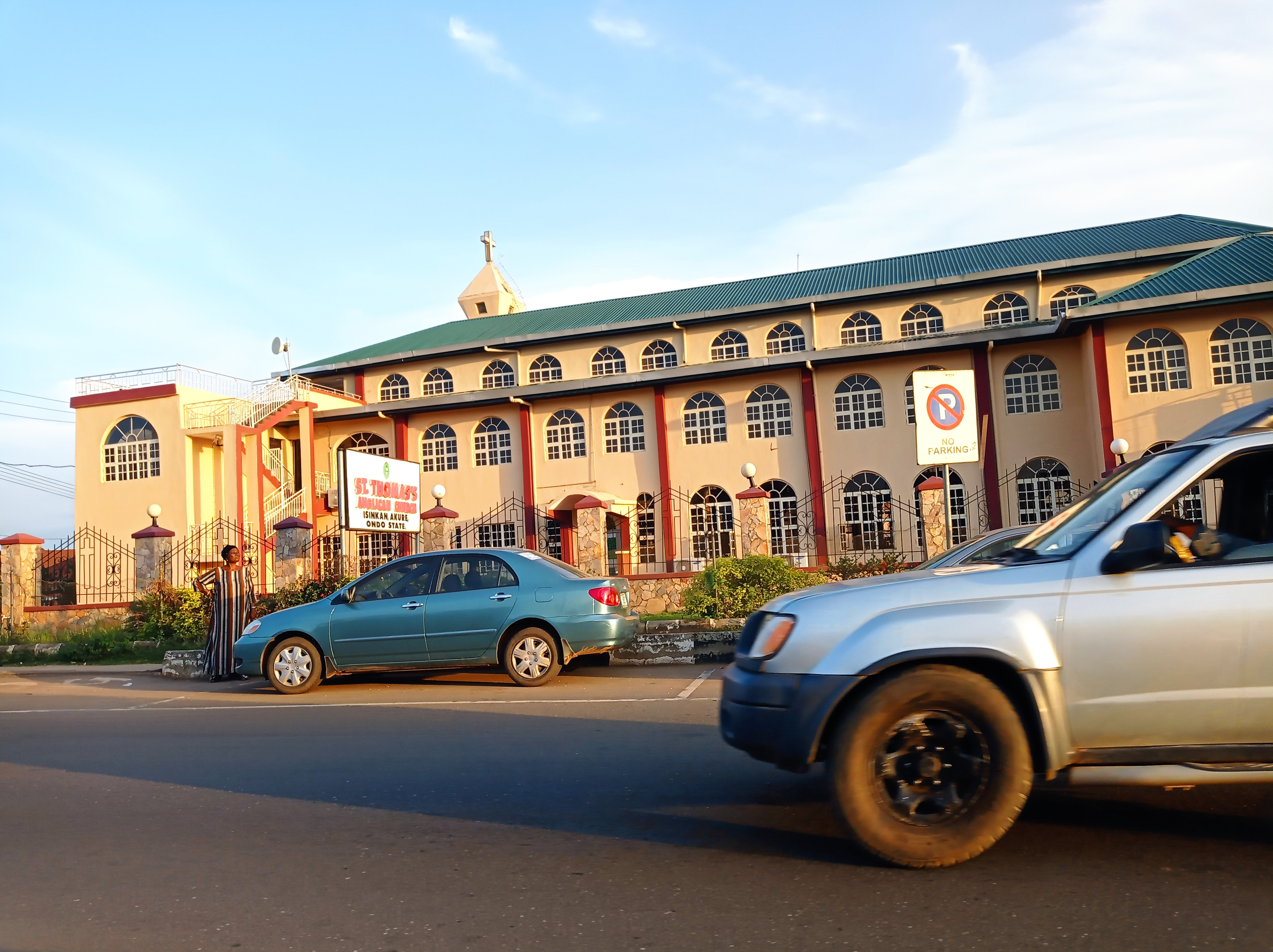
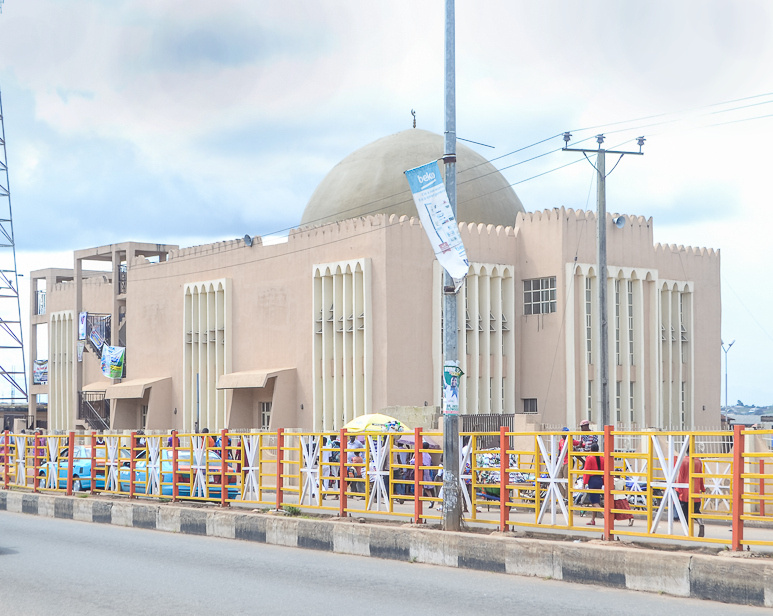
- An aerial view of Akure Federal University of Technology Akure cultural centre State revenue house Ọja Ọba Road Akure suburb Wide Angle Panorama St. Thomas Cathedral Central Mosque
- Nickname: Àkụ́rẹ́ Olóyèmẹ́kùn
- Location in Nigeria
- Coordinates: 7°15′0″N 5°11′42″E
- Country: Nigeria
- State: Ondo State
- LGAs: Akure North; Akure South

Area
  - Total: 991 km^{2} (383 sq mi)
- Elevation: 350 m (1,150 ft)

Population (2006)
  - Total: 484,798
  - Estimate (2011): 570,500
  - Density: 489/km^{2} (1,270/sq mi)
- Time zone: UTC+1 (WAT)
- Climate: Aw
- National language: Yoruba

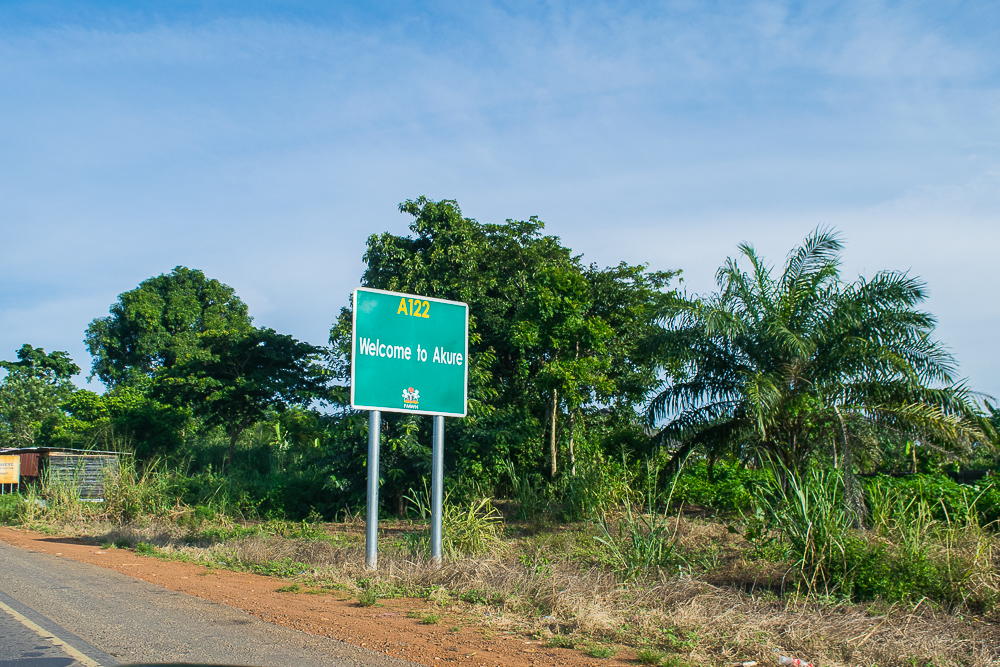
Welcome to Akure, Ondo State

Akure is a city in south-western Nigeria. It is the capital and largest city of Ondo State. The city had a population of 403,000 as of the 2006 population census. Its current population is estimated at 774,000.

== History ==
=== Pre-1914 ===
Short_oral_history_of_Akure_in_Akure_dialect_by_a_native_speaker_(non-subtitled)

Rock engravings prior to the Mesolithic period, have been discovered on the outskirts of Akure. Also the oldest Homo sapiens fossil ever found in West Africa thus far was discovered there, dating back to around 11,000 years ago. The Akure Kingdom is regarded as one of the sixteen ancient Ekiti kingdoms.

According to oral history, a person by the name of Alakure founded Akure, but Omoremilekun Asodeboyede (a descendant of Oduduwa) actually established the present dynasty of monarchs and the modern Akure Kingdom. The Prince left Ile-Ife, where Oduduwa ruled, in search of a place to settle after passing a strict test administered by Oduduwa himself, and eventually founded the city upon his arrival in the Akure region and his conquering of the Alakure. Asodeboyede represents the wave of princely descendants from Ile-Ife who ousted the indigenous rulers of the region. The Oba's Palace is located at the centre of the town, and was built in 1150 AD. It has over 16 courtyards (ùà), each having its unique purpose. Ùà Lílá (big courtyard, which serves as the town hall), Ùà Ùbúra (courtyard for swearing oaths), Ùà Jẹ́mifọhùn, Ùà Ùkómọ (courtyard for naming ceremonies), Ùà Ògògà (courtyard of the Ògògà), Ùà Oriole (courtyard for sacred religious oaths taken by chiefs and the king), Ùà Ojukoto (where religious ceremonies are held), Ùà Agbeto (courtyard where babalawo and priests of Ifa meet to offer prayers and council), Ùà Ameshe (where criminals were punished), are some of the names of the courtyards. At present, a bigger and more modern palace is being built to the south of the old palace's grounds. Oja Oba, which means the Oba's Market, is just a stone's throw away from the Palace.

Akure's King is known as the Deji of Akure and is supported by six (6) high chiefs (Iwarefa) in their domain. The totem of Akure is the Leopard. Omoremilekun (Asodeboyede), the first king of Akure, was himself called Ekun, meaning "Leopard" (this was his regnal name). It is for this reason that every descendant of the Akure clan has been addressed by outsiders as Omo Ekun during the recitation of their praise poetry or, alternatively, as 'Omo Akure Oloyemekun', since Omoremilekun was said to have stayed for a while at Igbo Ooye ascending to the region that would become his kingdom.The palace of the Deji of Akure was declared a national monument in 1990 by the National Commission for Museums and Monuments.

=== 1914–present ===
In 1915, the colonial government merged the divisions of Owo, Ondo and Ekiti to form a new province with headquarters in Akure. In 1976, the town became the capital of Ondo State.

Adebiyi Adegboye Adesida Afunbiowo II was chosen as the Deji of Akure on the 13th August 2010 to succeed the previous Oba Oluwadamilare Adeshina, who had been dethroned on the 10th of June 2010 for gross misconduct. Afunbiowo's daughter, the Omoba Adetutu, was appointed princess regent following his demise on the 30th of November, 2013.

In 2015, Omoba Aladetoyinbo Ogunlade Aladelusi successfully emerged the new monarch of Akure after beating twelve other contestants nominated by the Osupa ruling house to become the 47th Deji of Akure and was appointed as chairman of the Ondo State Council of Obas by the incumbent Governor of Ondo State; Governor Akeredolu.

== Economy ==
Akure has two television and eight radio stations: NTA Akure, Ondo State Television, Sunshine Radio Akure, Adaba FM, Futa FM, Empire Radio, Positive FM Akure, Orange FM, Galaxy Radio, Crest FM, and Breeze FM.

Akure is the trading avenue for a farming region where cocoa, yam, cassava, maize and tobacco are grown. Cotton is also grown and used to weave cloth. Grains like rice, beans, and millet are very common as they are the major sources of carbohydrate. It has a vibrant agricultural community who organise an annual trade fair under the shield of the Ondo State Agricultural Commodities Association

== Climate/Geography ==
Akure has a tropical humid climate with two seasons, wet and dry season.

Akure is about 7°25' north of the equator and 5°19' east of the Ekiti. It is about 700 km (430 mi) southwest of Abuja and 311 km (193 mi) north of Lagos State. Residential districts are of varying density, some area such as Arakale, Ayedun Quarters, Ijoka, and Oja-Oba consist of over 200 inhabitants per hectare (81/acre), while areas such as Ijapo Estate, Alagbaka Estate, Avenue and Idofin have between 60 and 100 inhabitants per hectare (24 and 40/acre). The town is situated in the tropical rainforest zone in Nigeria.

=== Temperature ===
The average annual temperature is 25.8 °C (78.5 °F) in Akure. A daily maximum temperature above 30 °C is typical during the hot season, which lasts about 2.0 months from late January to late March. March has an average high temperature of 30.5 °C and an average low temperature of 22 °C typically at nights, making it the hottest month of the year.

A daily maximum temperature below 27.8 °C is typical during the 3.8 months of the cool season, which runs from mid June to early October. August, with average lows of 20.5 °C and highs of 26.6 °C, is the coolest month of the year.

=== Cloud cover ===
Over the course of the year, there are noticeable seasonal variations in Akure's average percentage of cloud coverage.

Around mid February, the year's cloudier period begins. It lasts for 9.1 months, ending around November 15. Thence, and lasting for 2.9 months, the clearer season in Akure ends around February 12. The sky is clear, mostly clear, or partly overcast 49% of the time on average in December, the clearest month of the year in Akure. The cloudiest month in Akure is April, when the sky is overcast or mostly cloudy 86% of the time on average.

=== Rainfall ===
The total annual rainfall in Akure is 2,548 mm (100.3 in). With a typical 31-days of at least 12.7 mm rainfall, the rainy season lasts about 9.6 months, from February 6 to November 24. In Akure, September is the wettest month, with an average rainfall of 228.6 mm. From November 24 to February 6, the year's rainless season lasts for 2.4 months. With an average rainfall of 5.1 mm (0.20 in), January is the driest month.

Climate data for Akure (1991–2020)
Month	Jan	Feb	Mar	Apr	May	Jun	Jul	Aug	Sep	Oct	Nov	Dec	Year
Record high °C (°F)	39.0 (102.2)	39.0 (102.2)	38.3 (100.9)	37.0 (98.6)	36.5 (97.7)	33.4 (92.1)	32.5 (90.5)	32.0 (89.6)	33.0 (91.4)	34.5 (94.1)	37.0 (98.6)	37.1 (98.8)	39.0 (102.2)
Mean daily maximum °C (°F)	33.4 (92.1)	34.7 (94.5)	33.9 (93.0)	32.4 (90.3)	31.4 (88.5)	29.8 (85.6)	28.4 (83.1)	27.8 (82.0)	28.9 (84.0)	30.3 (86.5)	32.5 (90.5)	33.3 (91.9)	31.4 (88.5)
Daily mean °C (°F)	26.3 (79.3)	28.2 (82.8)	28.4 (83.1)	27.6 (81.7)	26.9 (80.4)	25.8 (78.4)	25.0 (77.0)	24.6 (76.3)	25.2 (77.4)	26.0 (78.8)	27.1 (80.8)	26.4 (79.5)	26.5 (79.7)
Mean daily minimum °C (°F)	19.2 (66.6)	21.7 (71.1)	22.9 (73.2)	22.7 (72.9)	22.3 (72.1)	21.8 (71.2)	21.5 (70.7)	21.4 (70.5)	21.5 (70.7)	21.7 (71.1)	21.7 (71.1)	19.6 (67.3)	21.5 (70.7)
Record low °C (°F)	11.0 (51.8)	11.0 (51.8)	16.0 (60.8)	15.0 (59.0)	19.0 (66.2)	17.0 (62.6)	18.0 (64.4)	14.7 (58.5)	17.0 (62.6)	17.0 (62.6)	14.0 (57.2)	11.0 (51.8)	11.0 (51.8)
Average relative humidity (%)	75.9	80.7	86.8	89.9	91.2	91.9	91.5	90.7	91.5	91.2	86.8	78.8	87.2
Source: NOAA

== Health and education ==
The state specialist hospital in Akure is equipped and staffed with trained medical personnel to cater to the health needs of the populace. To supplement the efforts of the state specialist hospital in this regard, there are other government health centres and private clinics. 'Abiye' health programme of Governor Mimiko's administration was recognized by World Health Organization (WHO) as one of the best health programs on maternal health programs with the establishment of Mother-Child hospital in Akure. St. John And Mary Hospital, St. David's Hospital, Tim-Unity Specialist Hospital, Oludare Hospital, Sckye Hospital, Nigeria Police Cottage Hospital, MIDAS HOSPITALS, Newday Medical Centre, Akure, First mercy specialists Hospital (Avon Healthcare), Joe Jane Hospital

The city has tertiary institutions which include: the Federal University of Technology Akure, Federal College of Agriculture, School of Nursing and Midwifery, and School of Health Technology. It also has famous secondary schools like St. Thomas Aquinas College, Oyemekun Grammar School, St. Louis Grammar School, and Fiwasaye Girls' Grammar School. The first two are for boys while the latter two are for girls in the tradition of early schools in school feca. The town also hosts to Federal Government Girls' College and St. Peter's Unity Secondary School, amongst many others. Primary schools are widespread but most of them often lack quality, there are few that offer quality education but are accessible to few elites.

== City ==
There are two other communities with their separate kings, cultures and traditions beside the Akure kingdom. The more prominent of the pair is Isinkan, while the second of them is Isolo. The ruler of Isinkan is known as the Iralepo while that of Isolo is known as the Osolo of Isolo. In the olden days, the three communities (Akure, Isinkan and Isolo) were located some distances apart. The war with the Benin empire in the pre-colonial period necessitated that the three communities move closer together however, and they have occupied their current positions ever since. Other nearby towns include Isarun, Ilara, Igbaraoke, Iju, Itaogbolu, Idanre, Owo, Ikere and Ondo.

The most influential Deji in recent history was Oba Adesida I who was known as Afunbiowo. Several Dejis after him were his direct descendants. Akure is also the birthplace of notable Nigerians like Chief Olu Falae (a one time presidential candidate of a political party who reigns as a titled aristocrat of the realm), legal luminary Dr Akinola Aguda and several personalities in the academia, industry, the military, judiciary and the civil service. Philip Emeagwali, the Gordon Bell Prize winner, and the mother of King Sunny Adé are both citizens of Akure. Akure is also the hometown of Ralph Alabi, a former chairman of Guinness Nigeria, and Kole Omotosho.

== Sports ==
For sporting events, Akure has a stadium with a capacity to sit 16,000 spectators. A new state-of-the-art stadium is under construction on the northern flank of the city. The town is the home base of Nigeria Premier League team, the Sunshine Stars. Akure have indulged into so many sporting activities and has won so many. A new stadium is under construction In Akure. Sunshine Stars FC of Akure, on Sunday, defeated Lobi Stars of Makurdi on Match Day 15 to earn their first victory of the second stanza of Group B of the Nigeria Professional Football League, NPFL.

== Football clubs ==
G-fold football league

Sunshine Stars F.C.

Wonderxchange Football Club

== Religion ==
Akure is a city with varied, liberal religious leanings. Christianity, Islam and the traditional Yoruba religion form the basis of faith for most residents. Religious syncretism exists among all three religions, with many Christians and Muslims still participating in traditional festivals. There is a preponderance of churches in the city. The Central Mosque, on the Oba Adesida Road, is a major landmark in the city. Worthy of mention is the fact that Akure enjoys a peaceful co-existence.

== Politics ==
Akure is currently represented in the state's house of assembly by Hon. Simeon Toluwani folahan (Akure South I), Hon. (Dr.) Abiodun Faleye (Akure North), and Hon. Olajide David Sunday (Akure South II). At the Federal level (National Assembly) their representatives are Abiodun Aderin Adesida (Akure North/South Federal Constituency) for the Federal House of Representatives 2023 - date). Also Senator Adegbomire for the Ondo Central Senatorial district under which Akure is.

== Notable people ==
- Ade Aruna (born 1994), American football player
- Campbell Ajiye (born 1981), photojournalist
- Kayode Ajulo (born 1974), lawyer and arbitrator
- Harry Garuba (1958–2020), poet and professor of African Studies and English
- Hon. Simeon Toluwani Borokini, politician
- Chigozie Obioma, novelist
- Godfrey Oboabona (born 1990), footballer
- Ayodele Olawande, Minister of State For Youth, Federal Republic of Nigeria
- Oluwole Adegboro (1948–2022), politician

== Gallery ==
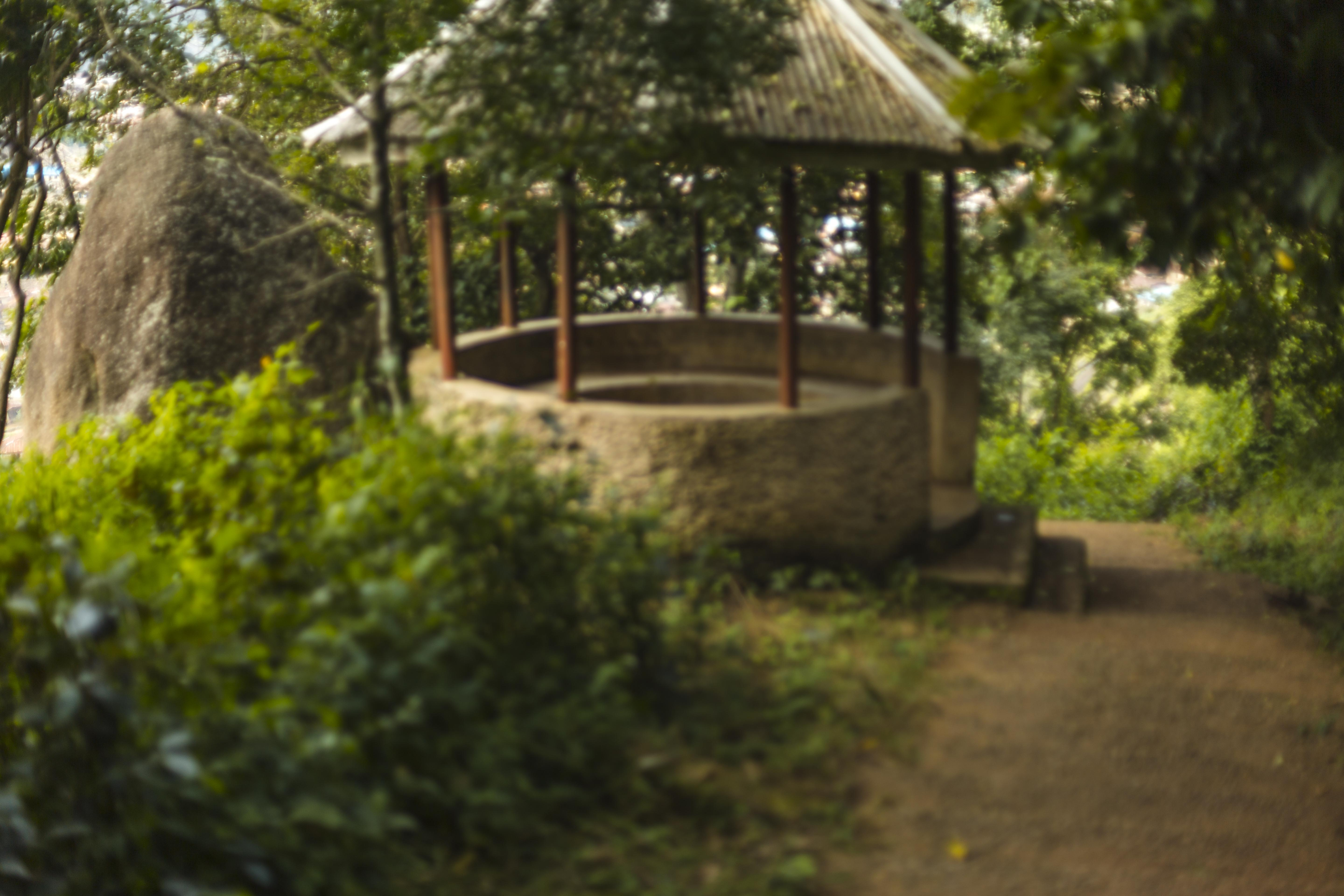
Resting point on Idanre hills

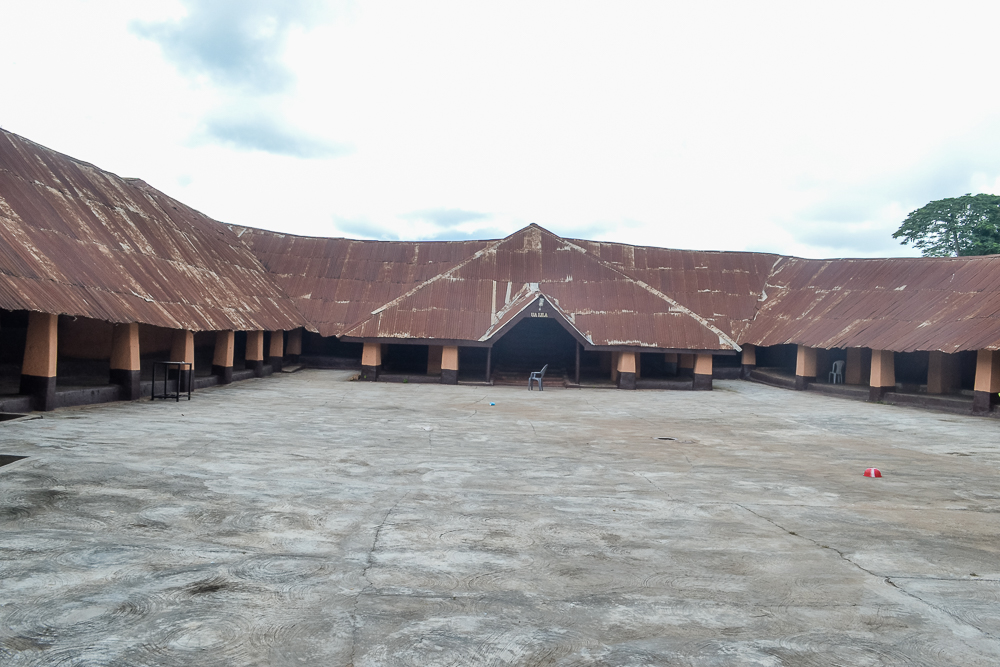
Old palace of Deji of Akure

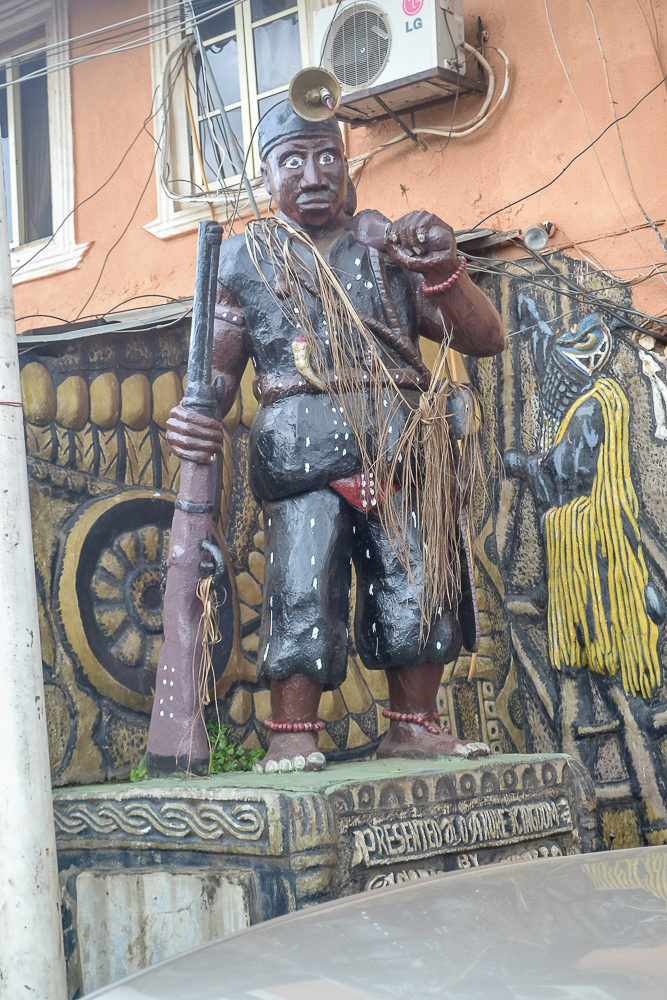
Statue at the Old Palace Of The Deji Of Akure

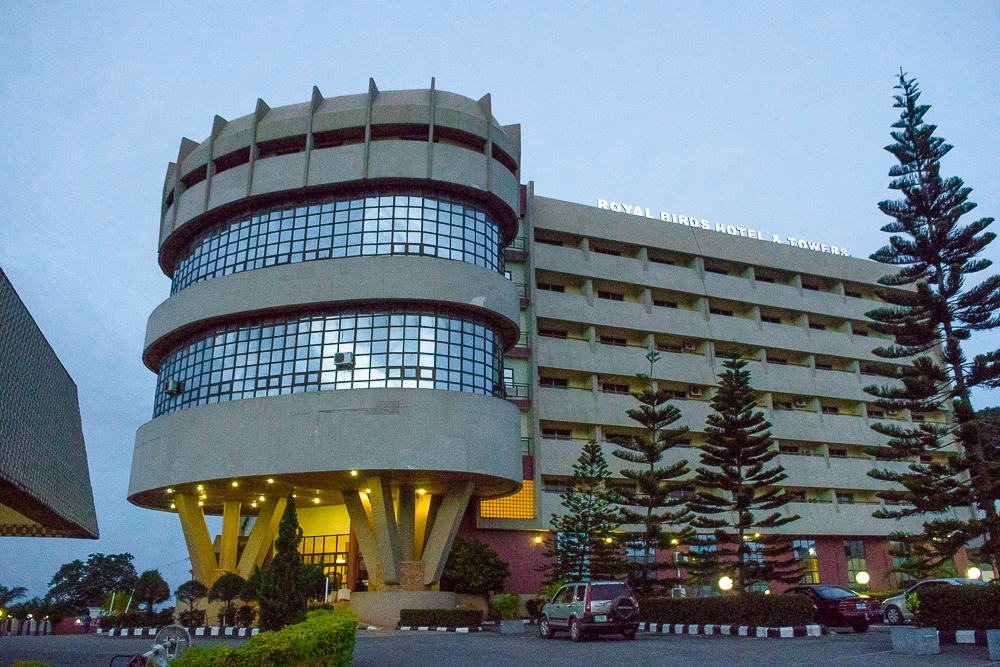
Royal Birds hotel, Akure

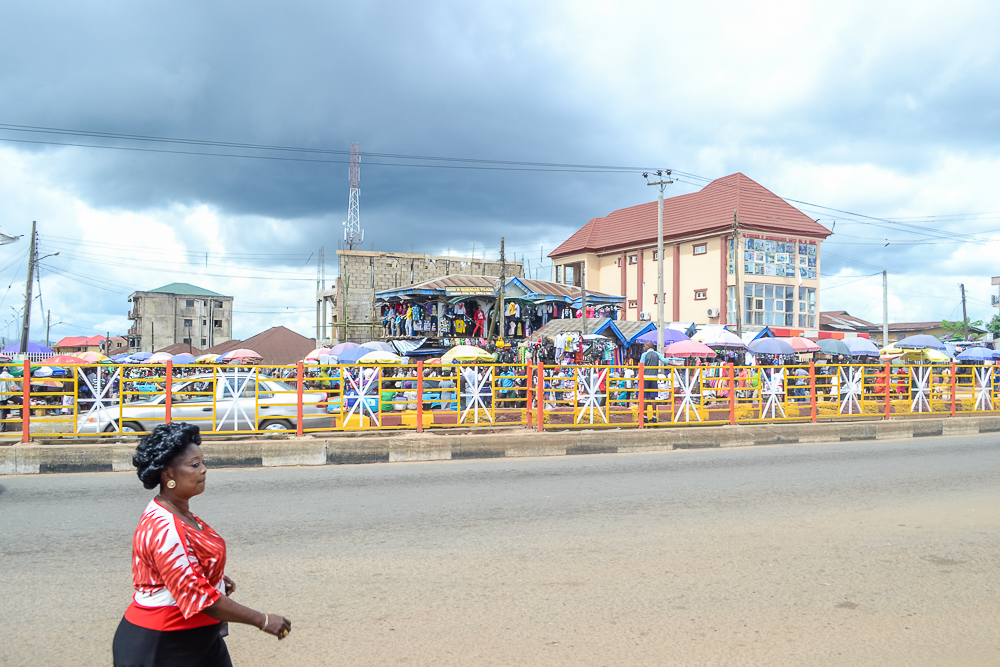
Akure City

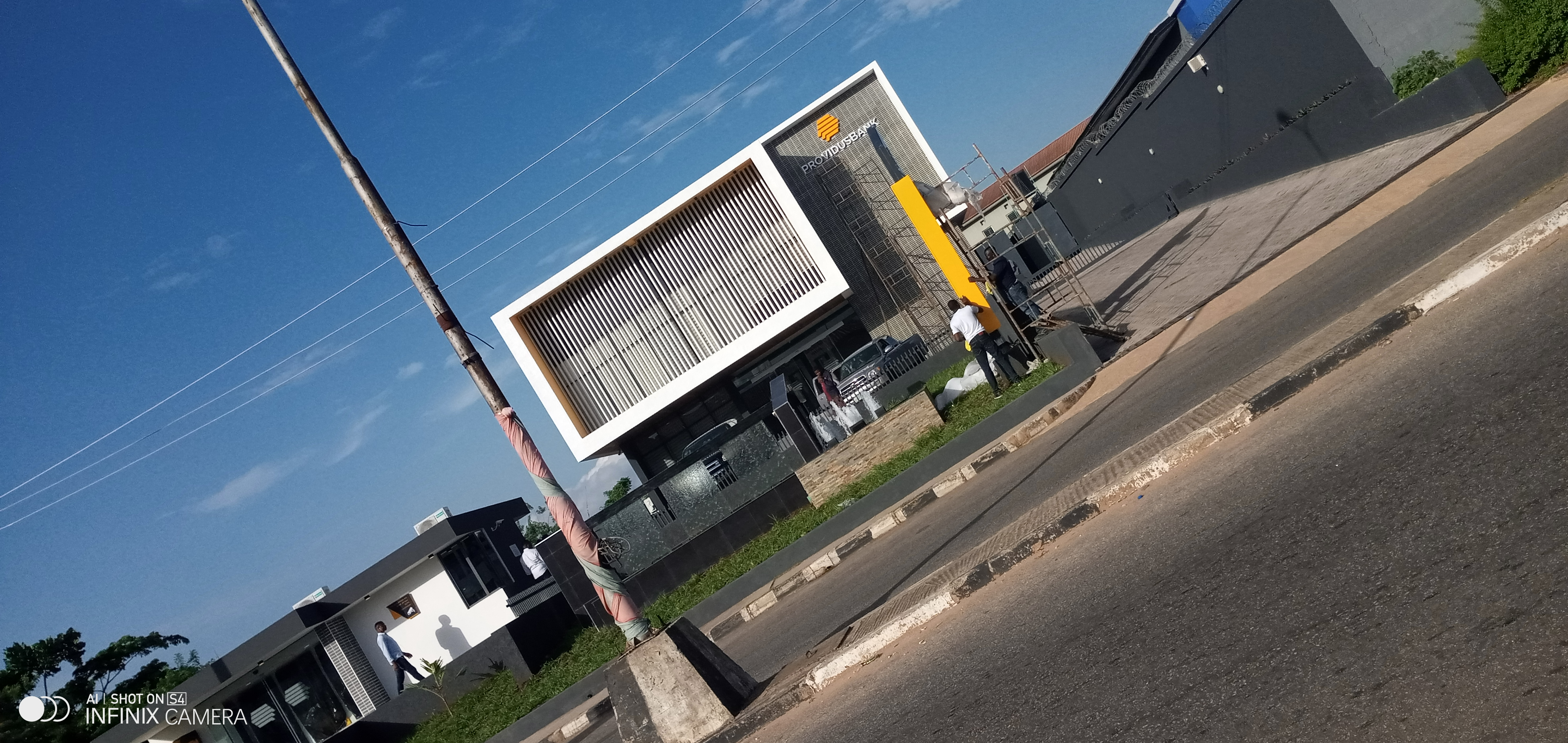
Provides bank, Akure

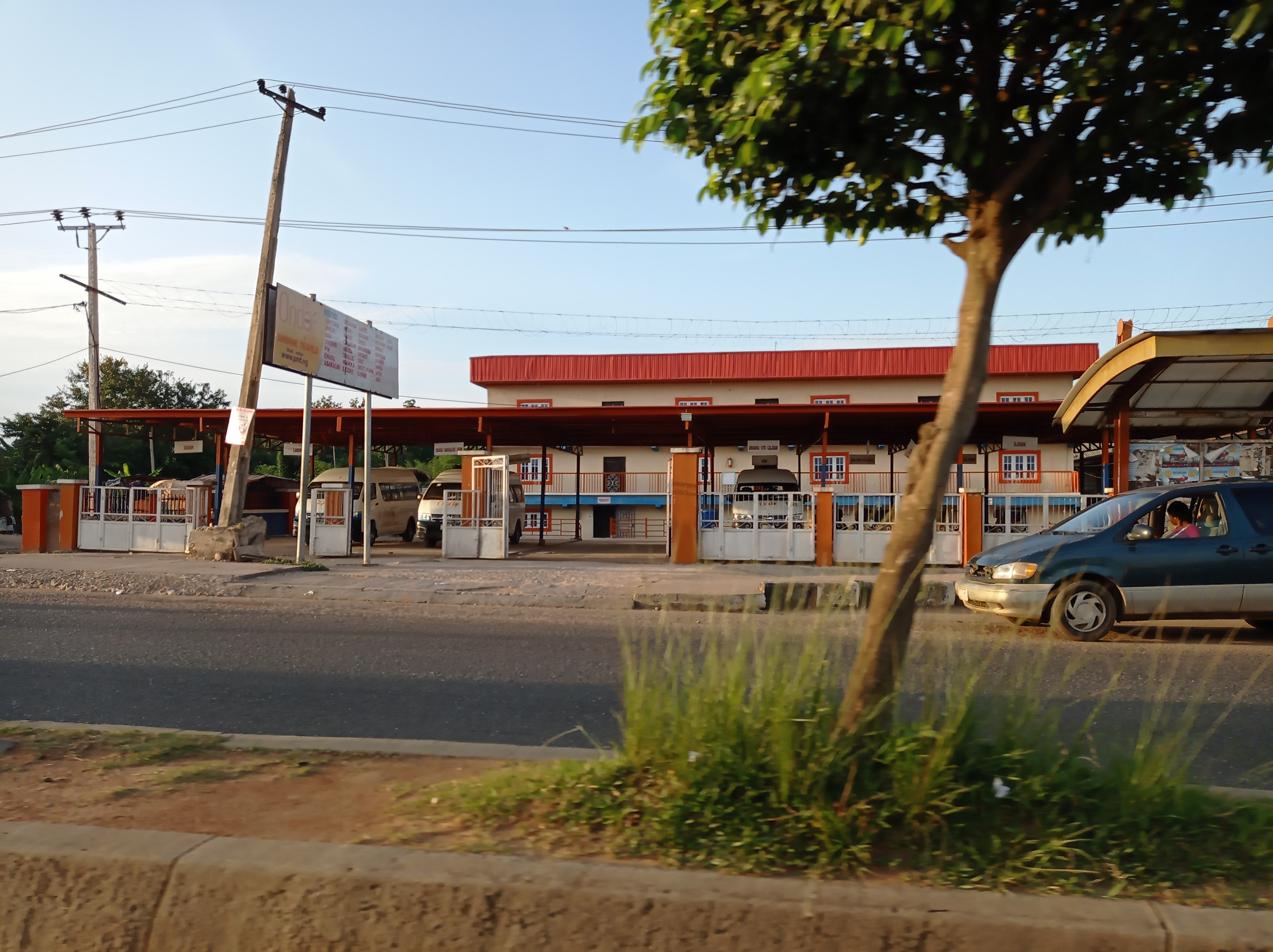
Sunshine Travels, Akure

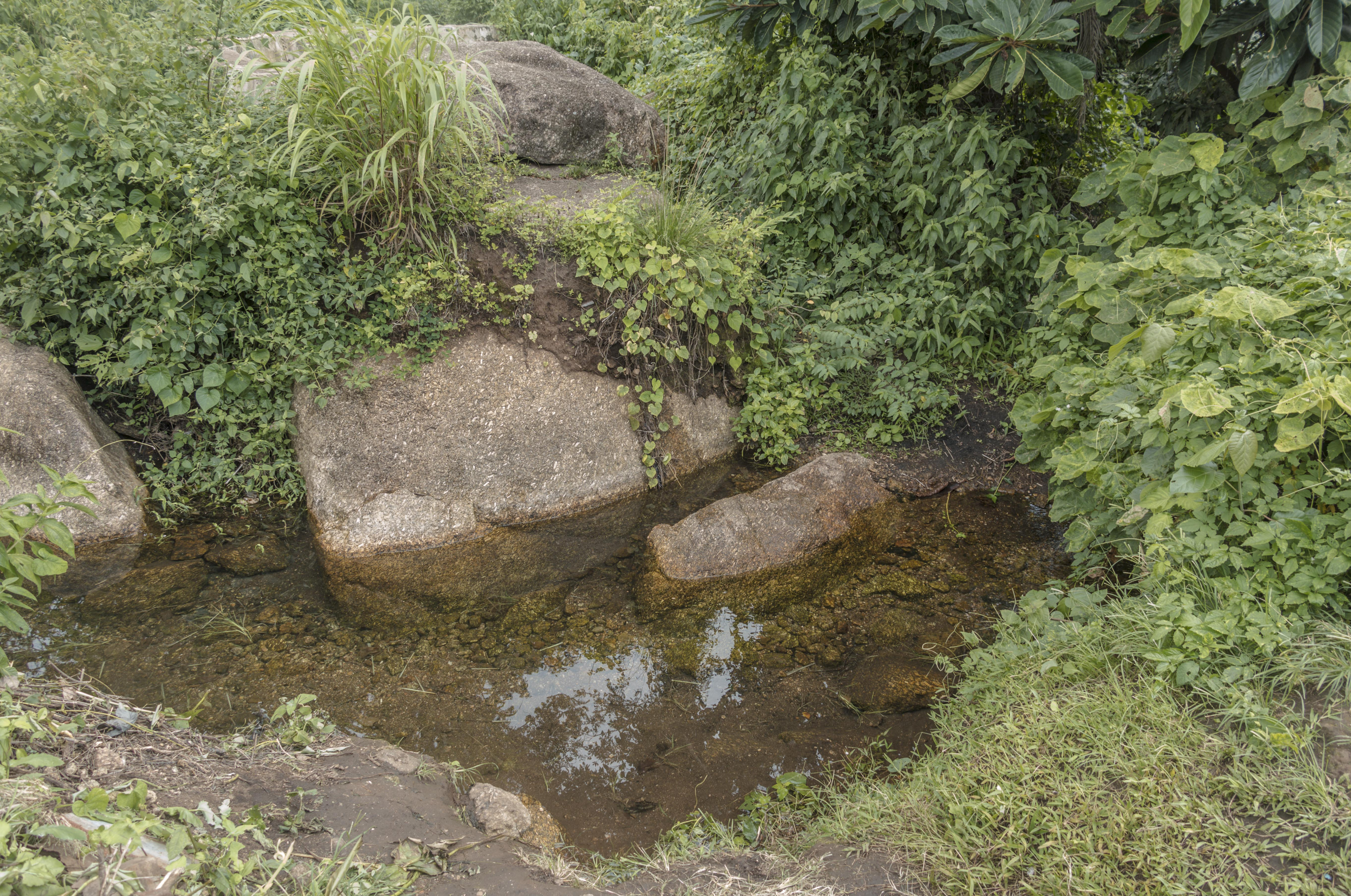
River on Idanre hill

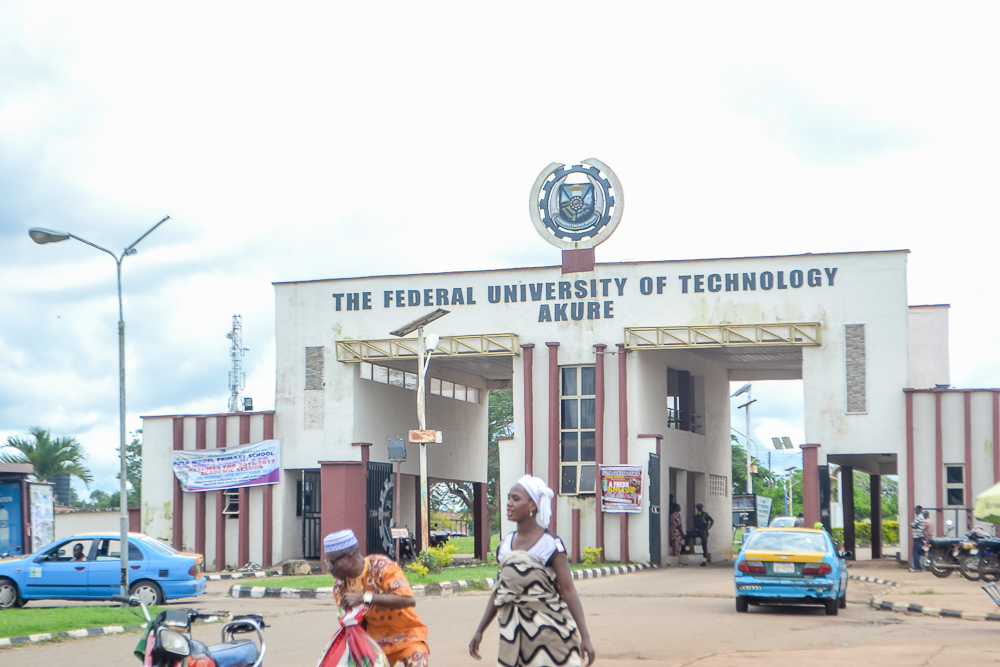
Federal University of Technology, Akure

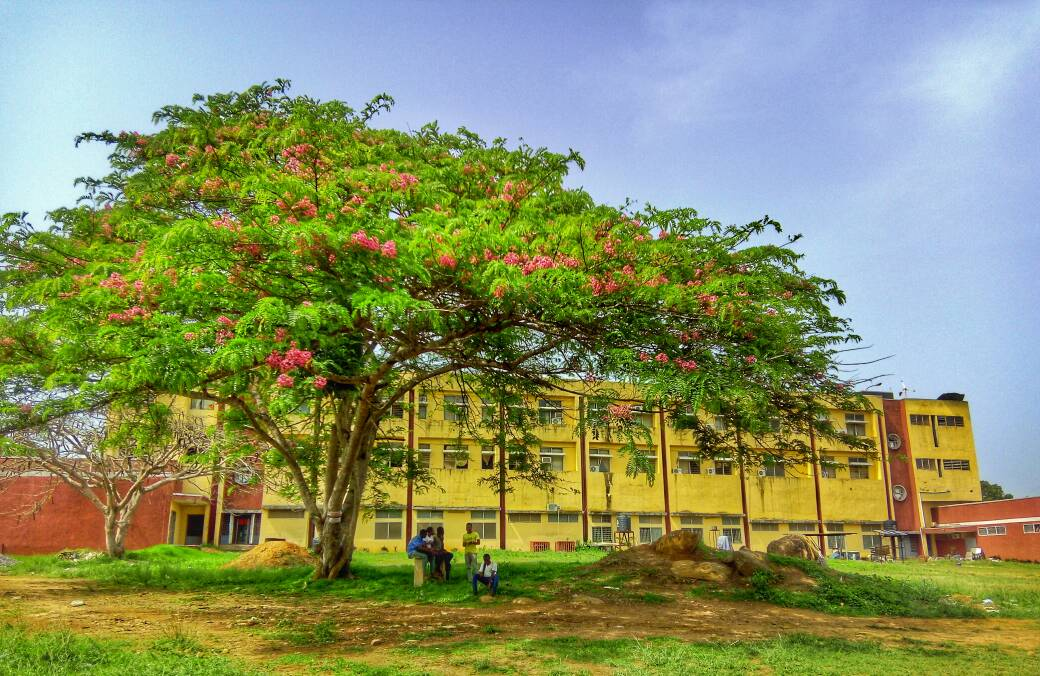
School of Engineering building beside ETF FUTA

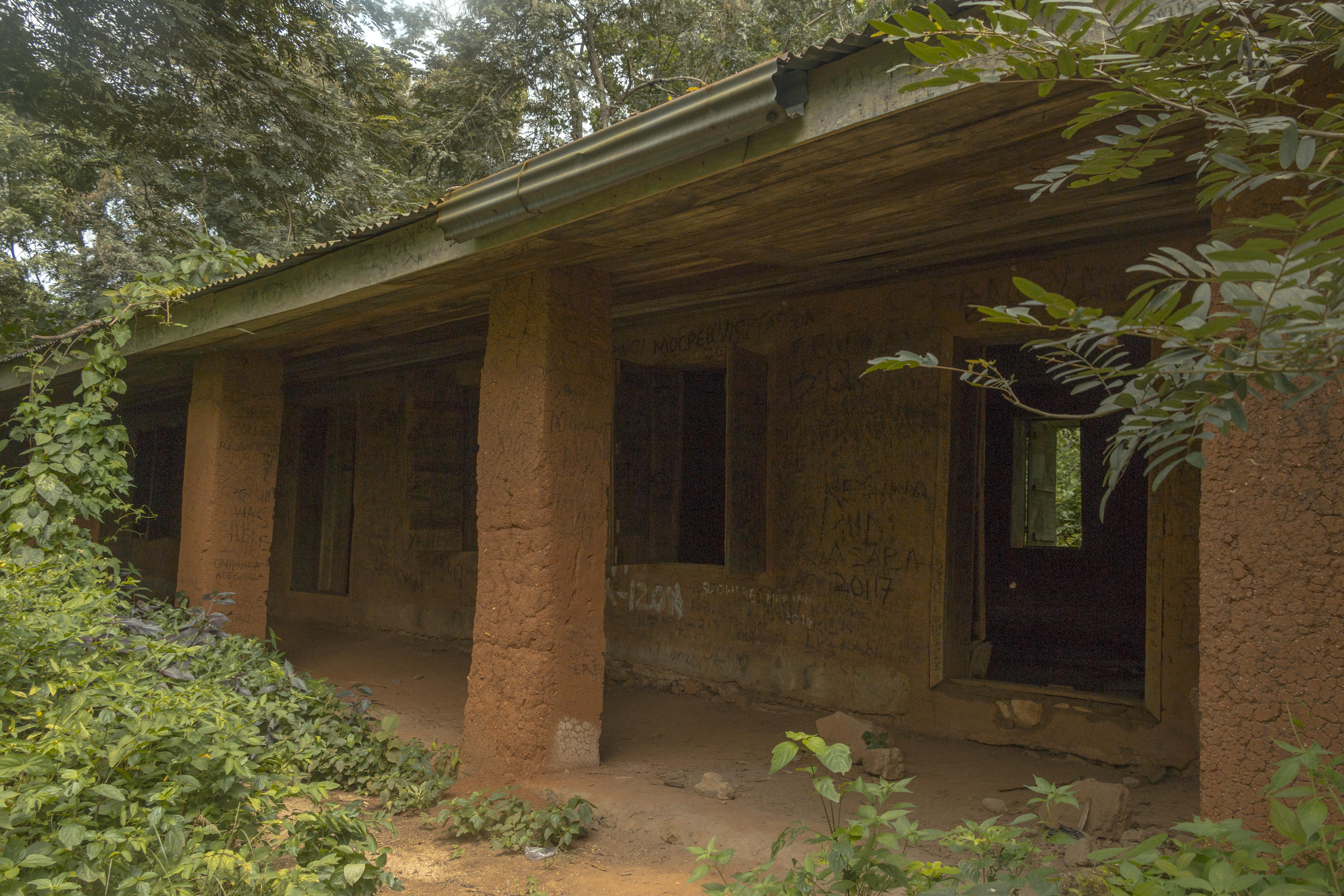
First primary school in Akure

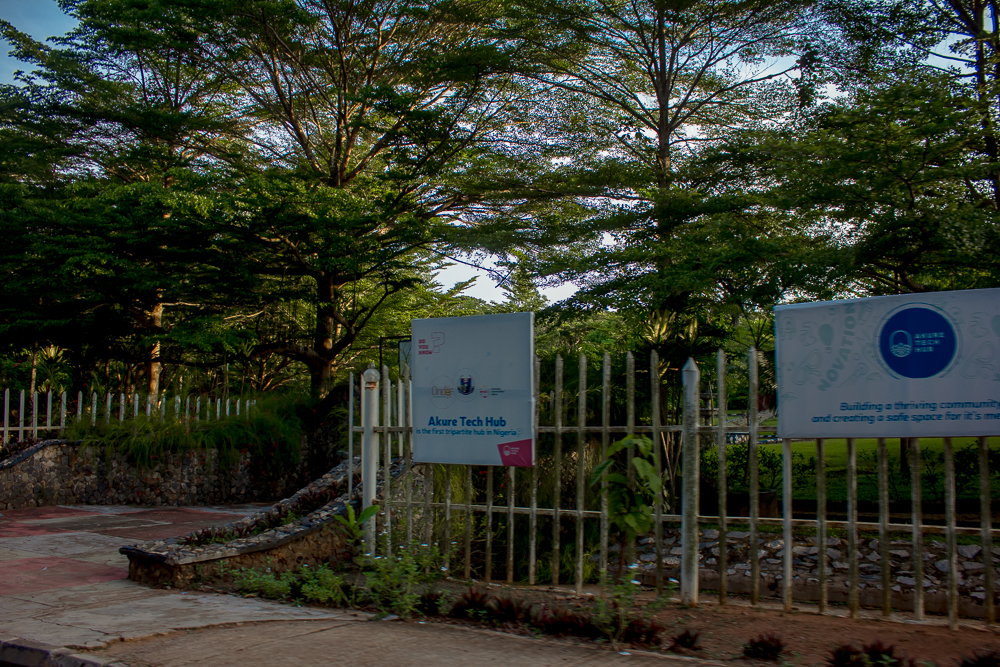
Akure Tech Hub

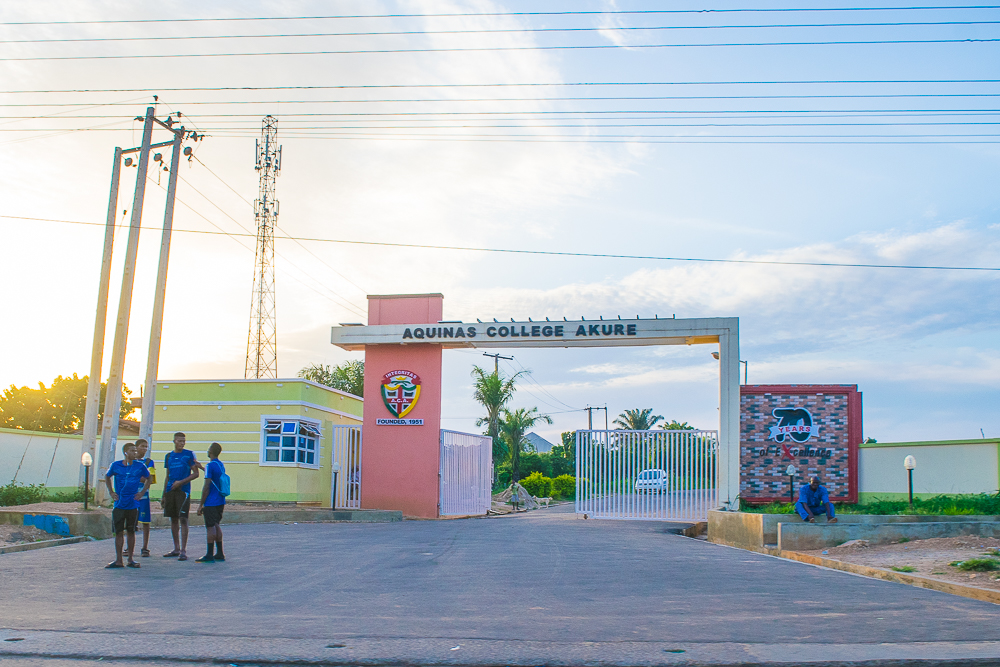
Aquinas College, Akure

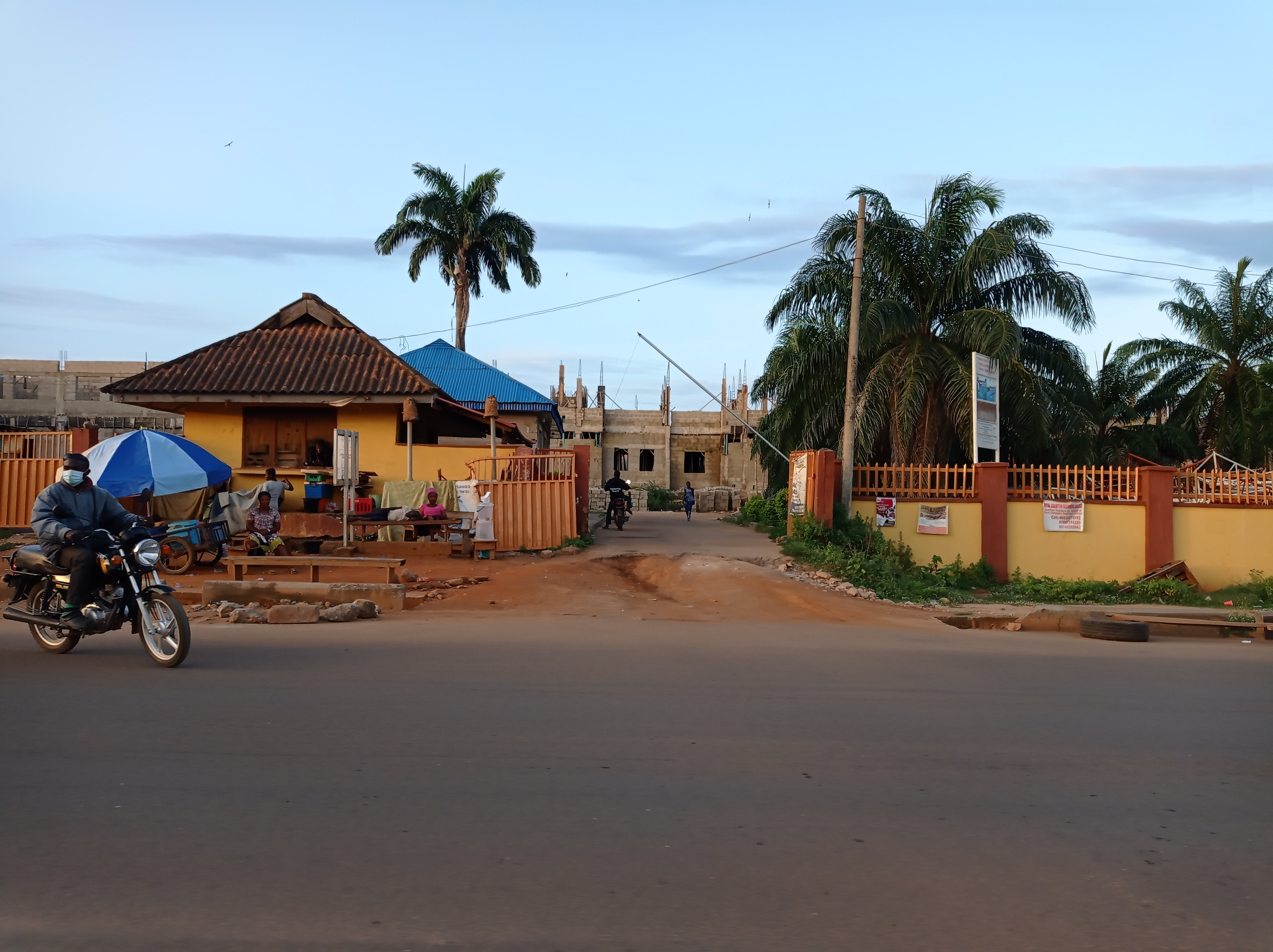
Teaching Hospital, Akure, Ondo State

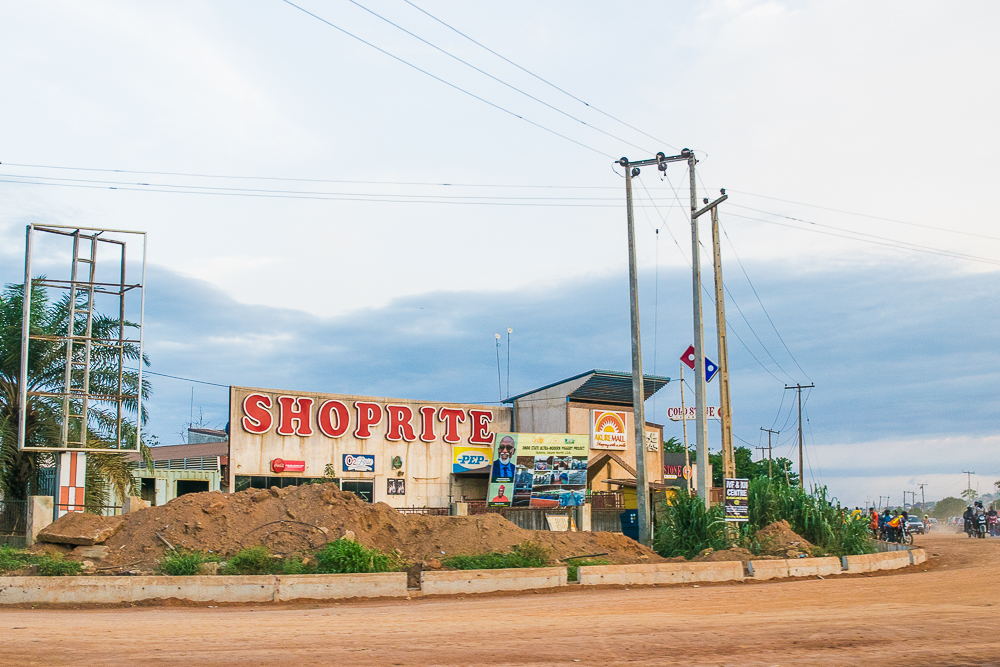
Shoprite Akure
