= Ondo State House of Assembly =

Unicameral legislature of Ondo State in Nigeria

- 10th Ondo State House of Assembly

Type
- Type: Unicameral
- Term limits: 4 years

History
- Founded: 2 October 1979; 46 years ago

Leadership
- Speaker of the House of Assembly: Olamide Oladiji, APC since 4 June 2023
- Deputy Speaker of the House of Assembly: Gbegudu Ololade James, APC since 4 June 2025
- Clerk of the House of Assembly: Jaiyeola Benjamin, APC

Structure
- Seats: 26
- Political groups: Majority (22): All Progressives Congress (22); Minority (4): People's Democratic Party (4)
- Length of term: 4 years

Elections
- Voting system: First-past-the-post
- Last election: 18 March 2023
- Next election: March 2027

Meeting place
- Ondo State House of Assembly Complex, Akure

Website
- https://ondostate.gov.ng/index.php/hoa-members/

The Ondo State House of Assembly is the legislative branch of the Ondo State Government inaugurated on 2 October 1979. The assembly is unicameral with 26 representatives elected from each constituencies of the 18 local government area of the state.

Presently, the Assembly comprises 22 members of the APC and 4 members of the PDP.

== History ==
In 2011, the assembly consisted of two political parties, the Labour Party and the Peoples Democratic Party, the assembly was dominated by the Labour party with a total number of 25 representatives and the PDP with only one representative. In October 2015, all members of the assembly defected to the PDP following the defection of Olusegun Mimiko, the then governor of the state from the LP to the PDP.

== Speaker and Leadership ==
The incumbent speaker is Olamide Oladiji and the incumbent deputy speaker is Hon. Gbegudu Ololade James both of the All Progressives Congress, elected on 4 June 2023 and 2025 respectively.

== Current House Of Assembly Member ==
S/N	Name	Constituency	Post Held
1.	Rt. Hon. Oladiji Olamide Adesanmi	Ondo East	Speaker
2.	Hon. Gbegudu Ololade James	Okitipupa II	Deputy Speaker
3.	Hon. (chief) Oshati Olatunji Emmanuel	Ose	Majority Leader
5.	Hon. Felix Afe	Akoko North West Constituency 2	Member
6.	Rt Hon Fabiyi Olatunji	Odigbo Constituency I	Deputy Chief Whip
7.	Hon. Suleiman Muritala	Akoko South-East	Whip
8.	Hon. Japhet Victor Toyin,	Akoko North East	
9.	Hon. (Princess) Ogunlowo Oluwatosin Ajirotu	Idanre	Dep. Minority Leader
11.	Hon. Chris Ayebusiwa	Okitipupa I	Member
12.	Hon. (Dr) Ogunlana Christopher	Irele	Member
13.	Hon. (Dr) Adeyemi Olayemi A	Owo Constituency II	Member
14.	Hon. Biola Oladapo	Ondo West II	Member
15.	Hon. Ologede Kolawole Michael	Akure North	Member
16.	Hon. (Eldr) Felemu Gudubankole O	Akoko South-West II	Member
17.	Hon. Ogunwumiju Moyinolorun Taiwo	Ondo West Constituency I	Member
18.	Hon. (Prince) Akinruntan Abayomi	Ilaje 1	Member
19.	Hon. Fatai Tiamiyu Atere	Akoko North West Constituency I	Member
20.	Hon. Olajide David Sunday	Akure South II	Member
21.	Hon. Oluwole Emmanuel Ogunmolasuyi	Owo Constituency I.	Member
22.	Hon. Daoudu Oluwatoyin Raymond	Akoko South West I	Member
23.	Hon. (Princess) Fayemi- Obayelu Olawumi	Ilaje II	Member
24.	Hon. Allen Messiah Oluwatoyin	Ese-odo	Member
25.	Hon. Oguntodu Olajide Johnson	Akure South I	Member
26.	Hon. Akinsuroju Akindolanii Nelson	Ile-Oluji/Oke-igbo	Member

== 9th Assembly leadership ==
Bamidele Oleyelogun of the All Progressives Congress (APC), representing Ifedore Constituency, was elected Speaker of the 9th Ondo State House of Assembly, while Ogundeji Iroju, also from APC, representing Odigbo I Constituency, was elected Deputy Speaker.
