= African Century =

Projected 21st-century African resurgence

Map of the African Union

The African Century is the belief or hope that the 21st century will bring peace, prosperity and cultural revival to Africa. Unlike other neologisms, this idea is not focused on the dominance of African politics and culture, but a development focus. Among those who have spoken of an African century are South African politicians Thabo Mbeki and Nkosazana Dlamini-Zuma, Chevron CEO David J. O'Reilly, US Treasury Secretary Paul O'Neill and celebrity campaigner Bono.

Nigerian economist and chair of the United Bank for Africa, Tony Elumelu, declared that the key components of Africa's role in the new world order are its: youthful, growing population; natural resources; entrepreneurship; and unification. In January 2025, the African Development Bank forecasted that Africa's GDP will grow at an average of 4% per year over the next decade, largely driven by entrepreneurship and innovation.

It has also inspired a radical policy journal - African Century Journal founded in 1999.

== Origin ==
While studying in Paris between 1946 and 1960, Senegalese historian Cheikh Anta Diop wrote a series of essays charting the development of Africa, which are foundational elements that comprise the African Renaissance.

With the establishment of the African Union, the entity seeks to promote political cooperation, manage conflicts, advance economic integration, uphold agreed governance standards, and strengthen Africa's collective position in global affairs. This union functions as the primary institutional vehicle through which continental aspirations for stability, development, and greater autonomy would be pursued.

The "African Century" gained prominence in the late 20th and early 21st centuries. In 2000, Nelson Mandela delivered a speech at the London School of Economics noting that "we are in a period of decisive historical significance for Africa and its place in the world. We are determined that this 21st century shall indeed be the African century." The phrase is often attributed to Thabo Mbeki, 2nd President of South Africa. Mbeki delivered a lecture at Gallagher Estate in Midrand saying that 'African leaders have the capacity to assist the African masses [and] capacity has to be built in policy-making processes to achieve policy-making autonomy where decisions are rooted on African realities, experiences and aspirations.' The South African Press Association (SAPA) reported that 'we must continue to claim the 21st as the African century.'

It has been subsequently reaffirmed by African political leaders. Ibrahim Traoré has been pegged as a "young" leader of the 21st century Pan-Africanism movement, largely thought to have died off after the post-independence wave between the 1960s and 1980s. Traoré, along with many others in West Africa, are making movements like the Alliance of Sahel States confederation.

== Reasons ==
=== Demographics ===
Population growth in Africa is expected to outpace the global population. At one billion people in 2010, by 2050, Africa's population should reach close to 2.5 billion, which would mean that more than 25% of the world's population will be African. The continent is set to reach close to 40% by the end of the century. The countries leading are to be Nigeria, Tanzania, Democratic Republic of the Congo, Ethiopia, and Egypt. While its percent of the world population is expected to grow exponentially, North American and European shares of the global population are expected to decline.

==== Human capital ====
In 2019, the World Bank released the "Africa Human Capital Plan." The World Bank has committed over 6 billion dollars in women's empowerment projects. Some of the key initiatives include: transportation projects, electrification, education, policy reform, and medicine. The 2022 progress report indicate that the Africa HCP investment goal has been exceeded, year over year, with a recent financing of $8.2 billion in fiscal-year 2022.

In addition to rapid population growth, Africa is rapidly urbanizing.

=== Economics ===
Africa's total GDP in 2000 was roughly $587 billion, representing 1.7% of global GDP. In 2024, the total GDP of Africa was approximately $2.96 trillion, accounting for about 3.5% of global GDP. Since Africa accounts for 18% of the world's global population, the current contribution wasn't significant but growing by nearly six times during the first 25 years of the 21st Century. Although this is progress, it is a relatively small portion of the global economy due to more rapid growth in other regions, particularly Asia.

==== Projects ====
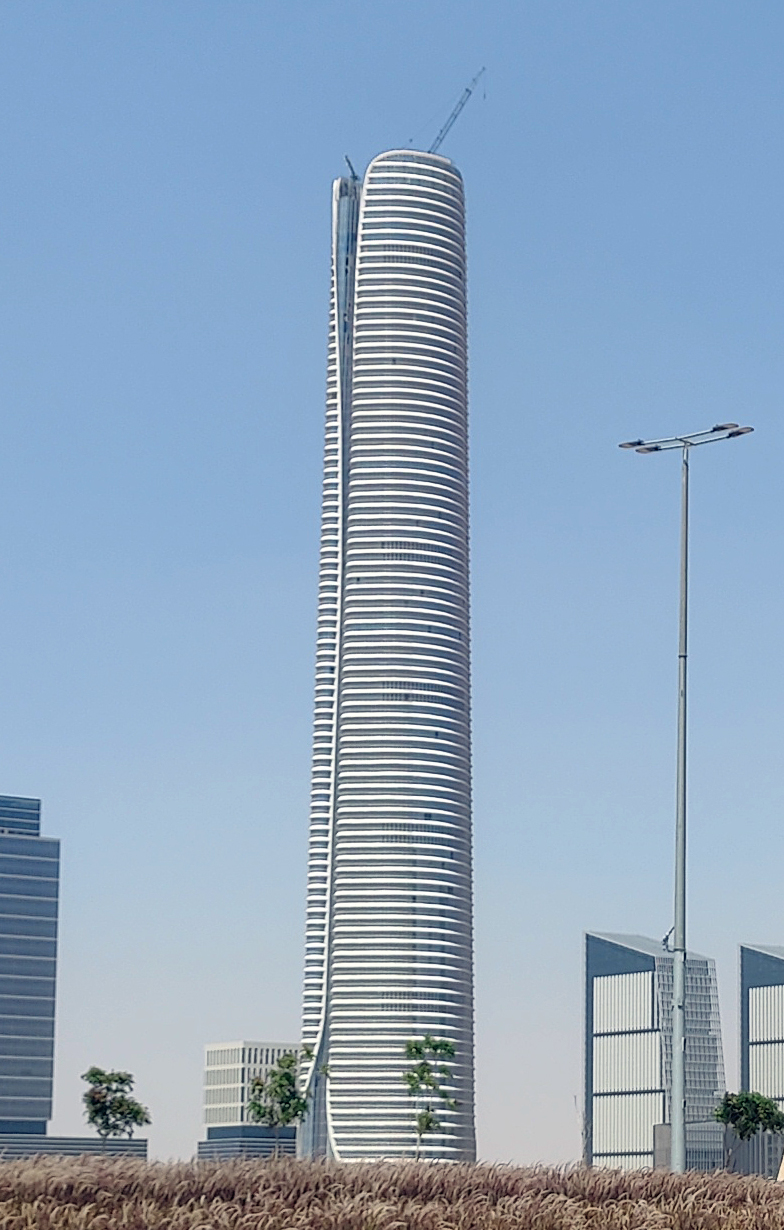
The Iconic Tower in New Administrative Capital, Egypt, which has been the tallest building in Africa since 2024

Some major construction developments are expected within the century. Some projects include: the Dangote Refinery, the Grand Ethiopian Renaissance Dam, the Lobito Corridor, the Abidjan-Lagos Highway, Egypt's New Capital, and the Lamu corridor. These megaprojects aim to improve infrastructure and create regional development, especially in key sectors like energy, transportation, and aviation.

=== Culture ===
Culturally, the African century is symbolized by Nigerian genre films (Nollywood, New Wave), Ghallywood genre films (Ghallywood), South African genre films, Senegalese genre films, and Afrofuturism. The awareness of African cultures may be a part of a much more culturally aware world, as proposed in the Clash of Civilizations thesis. The affirmation of African cultures affects the identity politics of Africans in Africa and outside in the African diasporas, symbolic of the overall role of African culture in the New Age movement. The Findhorn Foundation even notes worldview aspects like African drumming, sacred dance, and conservation.

As of 2014, Nollywood was worth ₦853.9 billion (US$5.1 billion), making it the third most valuable film industry in the world behind the United States and India.

The MTV Video Music Awards established the Best Afrobeats category in 2023, signifying Africa's pop-cultural influence on the global, especially Western stage. Further, artists like Burna Boy, Tyla, Rema, Wizkid, and many others.

In 2011, Africa Fashion Week London (AFWL) was founded Queen Ronke Ademiluyi-Ogunwusi. Although Africa's textiles, prints, and silhouettes have influenced global fashion for centuries, AFWL acts as a strategic tool for how African design can command global markets while retaining its "cultural soul." The 2025 session had partnerships with many companies including Meta AI, Disney's The Lion King, and British Council.

African cuisine has grown in popularity in the West, primarily due to African immigration and subsequent interest from non-Africans. As of 2021, West African cuisine was gaining the most traction in the United States. A key driver has been the sustainability and health trends in the West as many traditional African dishes are plant-based and incorporate gluten-free grains, such as fonio and sorghum. Many native crops offer significant nutritional benefits and are considered "superfoods." Also, Senegalese chef Pierre Thiam notes that African international markets "will be the most valuable point of culinary alignment." Africa has 60% of the world's arable land with native crops that are resilient, drought resistant, and adaptable to climate challenges.

Streaming has been a key element of African global cultural growth. Similar to other economies, TikTok has influenced numerous industries and led to global cultural influence. African food has contributed to TikTok food trends. In Los Angeles, California, #fufu went viral driving new customers who had never tried Nigerian food to seek out dishes, also generating local business. Streaming television has been critical, with major international players like Netflix, entering the African market in 2016 with an initial $175 million investment in South Africa, Nigeria and Kenya between 2016 through 2022. Then, the company invested approximately $250 million into South African content between 2021 and 2024. Many streaming platforms, like Showmax, have been critical to Africa's film and television sector growth. South African filmmaker Rethabile Ramaphakela is one of several African creators who have been able to find international audiences. Further, Afreximbank launched a $1 billion "Africa Film Fund" to finance production, distribution, and digital infrastructure. African-based media platforms, like Africa Magic and NotJustOk, provided options for media creators to distribute their different projects, typically low cost or free.

=== Politics ===
The global political position of Africa has risen in international bodies, but largely contested. As the first among the permanent five members of the UN Security Council to explicitly support permanent membership for African countries, the United States supported the idea of two permanent member seats for African nations. If for purely economic reasons, South Africa and Egypt would be ideal candidates but if for demographics, Nigeria and Ethiopia should be considered. Also, the DRC is considered an ideal potential member due to location, resources, and history of conflicts. The African Union was granted permanent membership in the G20.

The African Economic Community was established as a mutual economic development among the majority of African states. Some of the more granular 21st century established or planned blocs include AES and WAMZ. The African Continental Free Trade Area (AfCFTA) was established in 2018. A potential economic partnership with CARICOM is developing.

=== Neofuturist hub ===
A few nations have had increased activity in technological industries, including the countries Nigeria and Senegal. Some cities, like Lagos, Nairobi, and Kigali have been labelled "Silicon Valleys of Africa." The Next Generation Foresight Practitioners (NGFP) Africa hub is a project, that started in 2021, that includes digital governance across the continent. Planned city, Akon City, Senegal, was supposed to be a "real-life Wakanda" that uses modern technologies, including blockchain and cryptocurrency.

== Challenges ==
Getting African nations added to the Security Council as permanent members is a significant challenge as it would require a revision of the UN Charter by agreement of two-thirds of the General Assembly, including the five Security Council states with veto power.

Africa's prosperity or stagnation on the global stagnation will influence its migration in and out of Africa. A failure will increase migration out, especially changing the complexion of Europe. Historically, migration out of Africa has been relatively small, with only 440,000 people leaving per year from 2000 to 2005, equivalent to roughly 2% of population growth. If this rate continues, it is estimated that over the next 35 years, an additional 26 million Africans would leave the continent. In 2000, Africa accounted for roughly 30-40% of the world's conflicts. In 2024, it is estimated to account for over 50% of the world's active conflicts, the region with the highest concentration of wars and armed conflicts globally.

== Criticisms ==
Critics of African development are pointing out potential neocolonial dynamics and influence on African culture industries due to dependence on multinational corporations from outside of Africa for their global distribution. African-Asian, especially Chinese, relationships and partnerships have been significantly solidified. Also, the tech industry has been going through a "scramble" for Africa, similar to the colonial Scramble for Africa, citing potential new subscribers.

== See also ==
- Africanisation
- Africanfuturism
- African Renaissance
- Afrofuturism
- American Century
- Asian Century
- Millennium Development Goals
- Pax imperia
