= Sijuade =

Nigerian Yoruba Name

- Gender: Unisex
- Language: Yoruba

Origin
- Origin: Nigeria
- Meaning: "to lead the crown" or "to open the eye (in search) of the crown".
- Region of origin: South-west Nigeria

Other names
- Variant form: Siwajuade

Sijuade audio, spelt Ṣíjúadé in the Yoruban language, is a name of Yoruba origin, predominantly found in Nigeria. It translates to mean "to lead the crown" or "to open the eye (in search) of the crown". It's a name often given to children of royal linage.

== Notable people with the name ==
- Omo-Oba Adereti Sijuade (1895–1945), Merchant
- Tobi Sijuade (born 2002), Nigerian swimmer
- Okunade Sijuwade (1930–2015), 50th Ooni of Ife
