= Ajani Anibijuwon Omisore =

Nigerian Chief

Lowa Ajani Anibijuwon Omisore (c. 1841 – 18 March 1941) was a Yoruba aristocratic chief in Ife, British Nigeria who founded the town of Ayepe-Olode and founded the Omisore dynasty. He was granted the title of Lowa by Ooni (King) Adelekan Olubuse I of Ife, making him second-in-command to the Ooni. He subsequently served as a regent and a kingmaker in Ife, crowning Ademiluyi Ajagun and Adesoji Aderemi as Ooni. He led and managed the construction of Ife's major road networks under the wishes of Ooni Ajagun and later founded the town of Ayepe-Olode, which he transformed from a desolate jungle that was previously used by animal hunters.

== Renovation of Ife ==
Adelekan Olubuse I, the 46th Ooni of Ife, granted Omisore the chieftaincy title of Lowa, thus giving him great power and influence in Ife. Ooni Ademiluyi Ajagun desired a series of road networks that would connect Ife with neighbouring major towns. Omisore was appointed to lead a group of able-bodied youths from different Ife compounds to construct several intercity and intracity roads such as Ife-Ede road, Ife-Ondo road, and several township streets, which still exist in Ife today. His construction and engineering efforts earned him prestige and recognition as Lowa.

== Founding of Ayepe-Olode ==
During his construction in Ife, he discovered a vast rural jungle and requested Ooni Ajagun for permission to farm on the land. Omisore was granted permission to gain ownership over the large range of land, which stretched from River Aaye to River Ahanran. Omisore cultivated portions of the land, attracting tenants who paid him fees to hunt and farm on his land. He constructed a residential abode made with the bark of trees called Epo-Igi in the Yoruba language. It was so much fascinating that travellers passing by, normally refer to the location as, Aba Elepo; (a village of hut with bark-tree). The village quickly grew as a commercial centre, attracting farmers and wildlife hunters from locations such as Oshun, Ondo, Igbomina, and Benin.

With the introduction of cocoa as a cash crop in 1910–1920, Omisore started planting several cocoa tree seedlings, which attracted farmers from various Yoruba towns. This also attracted more elites of Ife to his land, which he granted land to. In 1927, he gave portions of land to his in-law, Prince Adesoji Aderemi (who had married his daughter; Olapeju-mother of late Tejumade Alakija). Also given portions of land were Prince Adereti (father of Ooni Okunade Sijuwade) including late Chief Adetipe and later, a stretch of land was freely given to the senior brother of his son-in-law, Prince Adewuyi Alausa (Senior brother to Ooni Aderemi).

== Native Court ==
Omisore served as president of the Native Court, where he helped British colonial authorities resolve indigenous disputes through the policy of indirect rule. British colonial authorities temporarily suspended Omisore from office and court for 3 months upon request from Ooni Ajagun. His alleged offences were "his failure to attend the reconciliation meeting called at the Afin after a quarrel between the sons of the two men" and wearing a special gown "in the Ooni's presence to which the Ooni takes objection".

Captain W.A. Ross, the British colonial Resident minister of Oyo Province, wrote about Omisore twice in 1923 and 1925. In 1923, Ross described Omisore as follows:

Lowa [Omisore] is the most prominent and helpful chief in Ife. Several of the others are too old to be of much use.

In 1925, Ross again wrote about Omisore:

Probably the most intelligent chief is the Lowa [Omisore] who has been entrusted with the task of teaching the Obalufe his duties as president of the Native Court. The Lowa is a sound chief. . . and has much influence in the town.

== Legacy ==
In 1930, Prince Adesoji Aderemi ascended to the throne as Ooni, and Omisore was able to consolidate his growing influence. Omisore died in 1941. His personal family residence is located at Ogbon Oya, and is between 120 and 135 years old. It is constructed in the Brazilian architectural style. Omisore was the father of Oba David Olajide Omisore and the grandfather of Nigerian politician Iyiola Omisore, who served as Deputy Governor and senator of Osun State.
