= Sijuwade =

Nigerian given name

- Gender: Male
- Language: Yoruba

Origin
- Origin: Nigeria
- Meaning: (One who) glimpses royalty.
- Region of origin: South West, Nigeria

Sijuwade audio is a Nigerian male given name and surname of Yoruba origin. It means "(One who) glimpses royalty.

Notable individuals with the name include:

- Oba Okunade Sijuwade (1 January 1930 – 28 July 2015), fiftieth Ooni of Ife
- Amina Sijuwade (née Dyeris), Nigerian lawyer and administrator
- Omo-Oba Adereti Sijuade (1895 - 11 May 1945)
