= Degbinsokun =

Ooni Degbinsokun, also known as Degbin Kùmbúsù, was the 43rd Ooni of Ife, a paramount traditional ruler of Ile Ife, the ancestral home of the Yorubas. He succeeded Ooni Adegunle Adewela and was succeeded by his son Ooni Orarigba.

== Ancestry ==
He was a son of Adesunmakin, a descendant of Ooni Agbedegbede, who in turn was a descendant of Ooni Giesi. His brother was Ooni Derin Ologbenla. He was a relative to Ooni Gbegbaaje (brother to his father Adesunmakin).
