= Adegunle Adewela =

42nd Ooni of Ife

Adegunle Adewela was the 42nd Ooni of Ife, a paramount traditional ruler of Ile Ife, the ancestral home of the Yorubas. He succeeded Ooni Wunmonije and was succeeded by Ooni Degbinsokun.
