= Adekola =

Adékọ́lá is a Yoruba name and surname meaning "the crown or royalty gathers success and wealth". Outside of Nigeria, it is also prevalent in the UK and the US.

Notable people with this name include:

- Adekola Ogunoye II, Nigerian ruler
- Adewale Oke Adekola (1932–1999), Nigerian engineer
- David Adekola (born 1968), Nigerian footballer
- Odunlade Adekola (born 1978), Nigerian actor
- Ooni Adekola, Nigerian ruler
