= Royal Traditional Council of Ife =

Council of the royal cabinet of Ooni of Ife

The Royal Traditional Council of Ife is the council of the royal cabinet of Ooni of Ife, the paramount traditional ruler of Ile Ife, the ancestral home of the Yorubas. The traditional council comprises all traditional chiefs and title holders in Ile-Ife.
