= Omisore =

Omisore Omíṣore Omishore
- Noble family
- Country: Nigeria
- Etymology: (Oshun the goddess of) water has done good things for me
- Origin: Ife, Nigeria
- Founder: Ajani Anibijuwon Omisore
- Current head: Ezekiel Iyiola Omisore
- Titles: Lowa of Ife; Oba of Aiyepe Olode; Senator of Osun State; Deputy governor of Osun State
- Members: Ajani Anibijuwon Omisore; Iyiola Omisore

The Omisore family (Yoruba: Omisore) is a noble Yoruba family originating from Ife, Nigeria. The Omisore family was founded by the aristocratic chief of Ife, Lowa Ajani Anibijuwon Omisore.

== Etymology ==
The surname is a reference to the Yoruba river goddess, Oshun. It is a contraction of the Yoruba phrase "Omi-ṣe-mí-lore", meaning "water has done good things for me". The surname has also been translated to "water has done good deeds" or "water has done us Favour".

== People ==
- Iyiola Omisore – Nigerian engineer, businessman, politician, and former senator of Osun State
- Ajani Anibijuwon Omisore – Chief and Lowa of Ife
- Dot da Genius (Oladipo Omisore) – music producer, audio engineer, and electrical engineer
- Dotun Omisore - Chemical Engineer
- Chief Adetunji Omisore - Lawyer, Business mogul, Grandson of Oba Adesoji Aderemi
- Kaziah Moradeke Milner nee Omisore - Hollywood Actress, Model, Business Mogul, Great Granddaughter of Oba Adesoji Aderemi
