= Amina Sijuwade =

Nigerian lawyer

Olori Amina Sijuwade

Kaduna State Ministry of Justice
- In office May 2015 – February 2017

Kaduna State Ministry of Environment and Natural Resources
- In office February 2017 – July 2019

Personal details
- Born: 22 May 1968 (age 57) Lagos, Nigeria
- Spouse: Adetokunbo Sijuwade
- Children: 2

Amina Sijuwade (née Dyeris) is a Nigerian lawyer, administrator, and member of the Sijuwade royal family. She has served twice as a commissioner in Kaduna State, first as Attorney-General and Commissioner for Justice, and later as Commissioner for Environment and Natural Resources.

She is married to Prince Adetokunbo Sijuwade, the Group Managing Director of the Sijuwade Group and son of Oba Okunade Sijuwade, Olubuse II, the 50th Ooni of Ife.

== Early life and education ==
Princess Amina Sijuwade was born on 22 May 1968 to the late General Danjuma Dyeris and Stella Dyeris. She was their only child until the death of her mother. Some years later, her father married Seyi Dyeris, who had five children with him: Abosede Dyeris-Folayan, Aminu Dyeris, Murna Dyeris-Obatola, Kyola Dyeris-Fakah, and Ibrahim Dyeris.

She studied English Studies at Obafemi Awolowo University, Ile-Ife, Osun State. She later proceeded to the University of Buckingham in the United Kingdom, where she studied law. She was called to the Nigerian Bar in 1995.

== Career ==
After graduating, Princess Amina Sijuwade began her career as a legal practitioner at Dipo Onifade and Associates. She later worked as a Legal Officer at the Nigeria Cybercrime Working Group (NCWG).

A few years later, she was appointed Attorney-General and Commissioner for Justice, Kaduna State, by Governor Nasir El Rufai. In this capacity, she served as the state's Chief Law Officer, advising the government on legal matters affecting its ministries, departments, and agencies. She was also responsible for protecting citizens' rights against abuse and violations, as well as overseeing the prosecution of criminal cases in the state. Her duties included drafting executive bills, contracts, and memoranda of understanding (MOUs).

During her tenure as Attorney-General and Commissioner for Justice, she recorded several notable achievements:

- Chaired the Committee of Attorneys-General of the 19 northern states of Nigeria, which reviewed the Criminal Procedure Legislation and adopted the Administration of Criminal Justice Act, later passed into law by the Kaduna State House of Assembly in 2017.
- Improved case management within the Ministry of Justice by introducing a computerised system for monitoring and tracking case files, with support from the UK Department for International Development (DFID).
- Reviewed prison decongestion guidelines to ease the implementation process of the exercise.
- Introduced skill acquisition programmes for prison inmates in collaboration with the National Open University of Nigeria and other partners in information technology, tailoring, carpentry, and hairdressing.
- Initiated the establishment of four Non-Sexual Assault Referral Centres across the three senatorial zones of the state, providing medical, psychosocial, and legal services free of charge to survivors of sexual and gender-based violence.

She also held several sub-ministerial and professional roles, including:

- Chairperson, Committee of Attorneys-General of the Northern States of Nigeria
- Member, Body of Benchers
- Member, Legal Practitioners' Disciplinary Committee
- Chairperson, Committee on the Establishment of the Kaduna State Traffic Law Enforcement Authority (KASTLEA) and the Kaduna State Committee on the Proliferation of Small Arms and Light Weapons (Disarmament Committee)

Following her tenure in the Ministry of Justice, she was appointed Commissioner for Environment and Natural Resources in Kaduna State.

Princess Amina is also active in charitable work. She serves as the coordinator of the Abraham Seeds Foundation, a non-governmental organisation established to provide care for homeless and abandoned children in the Federal Capital Territory. The foundation's mission is to restore hope and purpose in the lives of vulnerable children and prepare them for independent living as equal citizens of Nigeria.

In addition to her public service, she has extensive private sector experience, having held various management positions in organisations such as Abuja Investments Company Limited, Northern Numero Resources Ltd, Advocaat Law Practice, Aurelia Mining Ltd—a UK-based gold exploration company that owns the Babban Tsauni Gold Project in Abuja—and Business Development and Investments Ltd (BDI Ltd), a consultancy responsible for developing a state-wide strategy for solid minerals sector development in Kaduna State.

== Personal life ==
Princess Amina Sijuwade married Prince Adetokunbo Sijuwade, Managing Director of the Sijuwade Group and son of Oba Okunade Sijuwade, in 1996. The couple has two children: Adedunni Sijuwade (born 1998) and Adejuwon Sijuwade (born 2000).
