= Akinmoyero =

Ooni Akinmoyero was the 38th Ooni of Ife, a paramount traditional ruler of Ile Ife, the ancestral home of the Yorubas. He succeeded Ooni Ojigidiri and was succeeded by Ooni Gbanlare.
