= Gbanlare =

Ooni Gbanlare or Gbániárè was the 39th Ooni of Ife, a paramount traditional ruler of Ile Ife, the ancestral home of the Yorubas in West Africa. He was in office from 1800 to 1823 and succeeded Ooni Akinmoyero and was succeeded by Ooni Gbegbaaje.
