= Wunmonije =

Nigerian Monarch and the 41st Ooni of Ife

Ooni Wunmonije was the 41st Ooni of Ife, a paramount traditional ruler of Ile Ife, the ancestral home of the Yorubas. He succeeded Ooni Gbegbaaje and was succeeded by Ooni Adegunle Adewela.
