= Orarigba =

Ooni Orarigba was the 44th Ooni of Ife, a paramount traditional ruler of Ile Ife, the ancestral home of the Yorubas. He succeeded Ooni Degbinsokun and was succeeded by Ooni Derin Ologbenla. He is the great-great grandfather of the current Ooni of Ife Adeyeye Enitan Ogunwusi.

== Ancestry ==
Orarigba (or Ọ̀ráyẹ̀gbà/Ọ̀ráyìgbà), was born to Degbin Kùmbúsù, a son of Adesunmakin. Adesunmakin was a descendant of Ooni Agbedegbede, who in turn, was a descendant of Ooni Giesi.
