= African Renaissance =

African concept

The African Renaissance is the concept that the African people shall overcome the current challenges confronting the continent and achieve cultural, scientific, and economic renewal. This concept was first articulated by Cheikh Anta Diop in a series of essays between 1946 and 1960, later collected in a book titled Towards the African Renaissance. Diop's ideas were further popularized by former President of South Africa Thabo Mbeki during his tenure as Deputy President, where the African Renaissance continues to play a key role in the post-apartheid intellectual agenda.

== Description ==
The African Renaissance is a philosophical and political movement to end the violence, elitism, corruption, and poverty believed to plague the African continent, and to replace them with a more just and equitable order. For Noel Moukala, however, the African Renaissance cannot exist without first achieving African Unity.

Okumu compiled a list of perceived African traits that he believes are worthy of preservation and continuation. These include aspects of interpersonal relations, such as "social inclusion, hospitality, and generous sharing," as well as attentive and perceptive listening. He additionally argues that social acceptance is not based on wealth, but on the basis of relationships to others.

== Origins ==
As a student in Paris between 1946 and 1960, Senegalese historian Cheikh Anta Diop wrote a series of essays charting the development of Africa. Diop's work was later seen as a blueprint for former President of South Africa Thabo Mbeki. When giving his famous "I Am an African" speech at Cape Town, celebrating the adoption of a new Constitution of South Africa, Mbeki said:

I am born of a people who are heroes and heroines [...] Patient because history is on their side, these masses do not despair because today the weather is bad. Nor do they turn triumphalist when, tomorrow, the sun shines. [...] Whatever the circumstances they have lived through and because of that experience, they are determined to define for themselves who they are and who they should be.

In April 1997, Mbeki articulated the elements that comprise the African Renaissance: social cohesion, democracy, economic rebuilding and growth, and the establishment of Africa as a significant player in geopolitical affairs. Two months later, Vusi Maviembela, an advisor to Mbeki, wrote that the African Renaissance was the "third moment" in post-colonial Africa, following decolonization and the spread of democracy across the continent in the early 1990s. Deputy President Mbeki codified his beliefs, and the reforms that would comprise them, in the "African Renaissance Statement" given August 13, 1998.

In March 1998, United States President Bill Clinton visited Botswana, Ghana, Rwanda, Senegal, South Africa, and Uganda in a 12-day tour, which he proclaimed as the "beginning of a new African renaissance" following apartheid, colonialism, and the Cold War. While Clinton praised the continent's increase in democratically elected governments, news outlets countered that many African leaders operated in one-party states. The outbreak of the Eritrean–Ethiopian War in May 1998 and Second Congo War in August 1998 led to further doubts of a peaceful future. By August 2000, the United States' National Intelligence Estimate argued that the movement had failed due to democratic backsliding, corruption, and disease outbreaks.

The weekend of September 28, 1998, some 470 participants attended the African Renaissance Conference in Johannesburg. The next year, a book titled African Renaissance was released, with thirty essays arranged under topics corresponding to the conference's breakout sessions: "culture and education, economic transformation, science and technology, transport and energy, moral renewal and African values, and media and telecommunications." Mbeki, the keynote speaker at the opening plenary session of the conference, wrote the book's prologue.

Other figures associated with the African Renaissance and the new generation of African leaders are President Yoweri Museveni of Uganda and President Paul Kagame of Rwanda.

== African Renaissance Institute ==
On October 11, 1999, the African Renaissance Institute (ARI) was founded in Pretoria. Its initial focuses were on the development of African human resources, science and technology, agriculture, nutrition and health, culture, business, peace, and good governance. In his book The African Renaissance, Washington Aggrey Jalang'o Okumu wrote that,

"The most important and primary role of the African Renaissance Institute now and in the coming years is to gather a critical mass of first-class African scientists and to give them large enough grants on a continuing basis, as well as sufficient infrastructure, to enable them to undertake meaningful problem-solving R&D applied to industrial production that will lead to really important results of economic dimensions."

== Revival ==
The African Renaissance has been taken up as part of the International Decade for People of African Descent from 2015 to 2024, in which the Door of Return Initiative seeks to bring members of the African diaspora back to the continent. The initiative is spearheaded by the historical Maroon community of Accompong, Jamaica, in cooperation with Nigeria, Ghana, and Zimbabwe.

== See also ==
- African Century
- Philosophers Legacy (Heirloom), painting
- African Renaissance Monument, Dakar, Senegal
- New Partnership for Africa's Development
- Pan-Africanism

== Bibliography ==
- Malegapuru William Makgoba, ed., African Renaissance, Mafube and Tafelberg, Sandton and Cape Town, 1999
- Okumu, Washington A. J. (2002). The African Renaissance. Trenton, NJ and Asmara, Eritrea: Africa World Press. ISBN 1-59221-012-0.
