= Luwo (Ooni) =

21st Ooni of Ife

Ooni Lúwo Gbàgìdá (sometimes spelled as Luwoo) was the 21st Ooni of Ife, a paramount traditional ruler of Ile Ife, the ancestral home of the Yorubas in the 10th century.

She was the first and the only female paramount ruler of Ile-Ife believed to be the origin of Yoruba ethnic group in West Africa, succeeding Ooni Giesi and succeeded by Ooni Lumobi. Ooni Luwoo's reign remains the only one by a female in Ife to date. Her son Adekola Telu was the founder of the Iwo Kingdom. She was portrayed in Dimeji Sodeke's 2022 play Ooni Luwo: One Queen, Two Kings.
