= Derin Ologbenla =

Derin Ologbenla, born Adérìnsókun Ológbeńlá (died 1894), was the 45th Ooni of Ife, a paramount traditional ruler of Ile Ife, the ancestral home of the Yorubas. He succeeded Ooni Ooni Orarigba and was succeeded by Ooni Adelekan Olubuse I.

== Life ==
Adérìnsókun "Derin" Ológbeńlá was born in the early part of the 19th century as a son of Adesunmakin, a son of Ooni Agbedegbede. Derin was thus a descendant of Ooni Giesi. Among his siblings were Degbin Kùmbúsù, the father to Ooni Orayigba, who Derin succeeded.
