= Ronke Ademiluyi =

Nigerian fashion expert, author and entrepreneur

Her Royal Majesty Olori Aderonke Ademiluyi-Ogunwusi
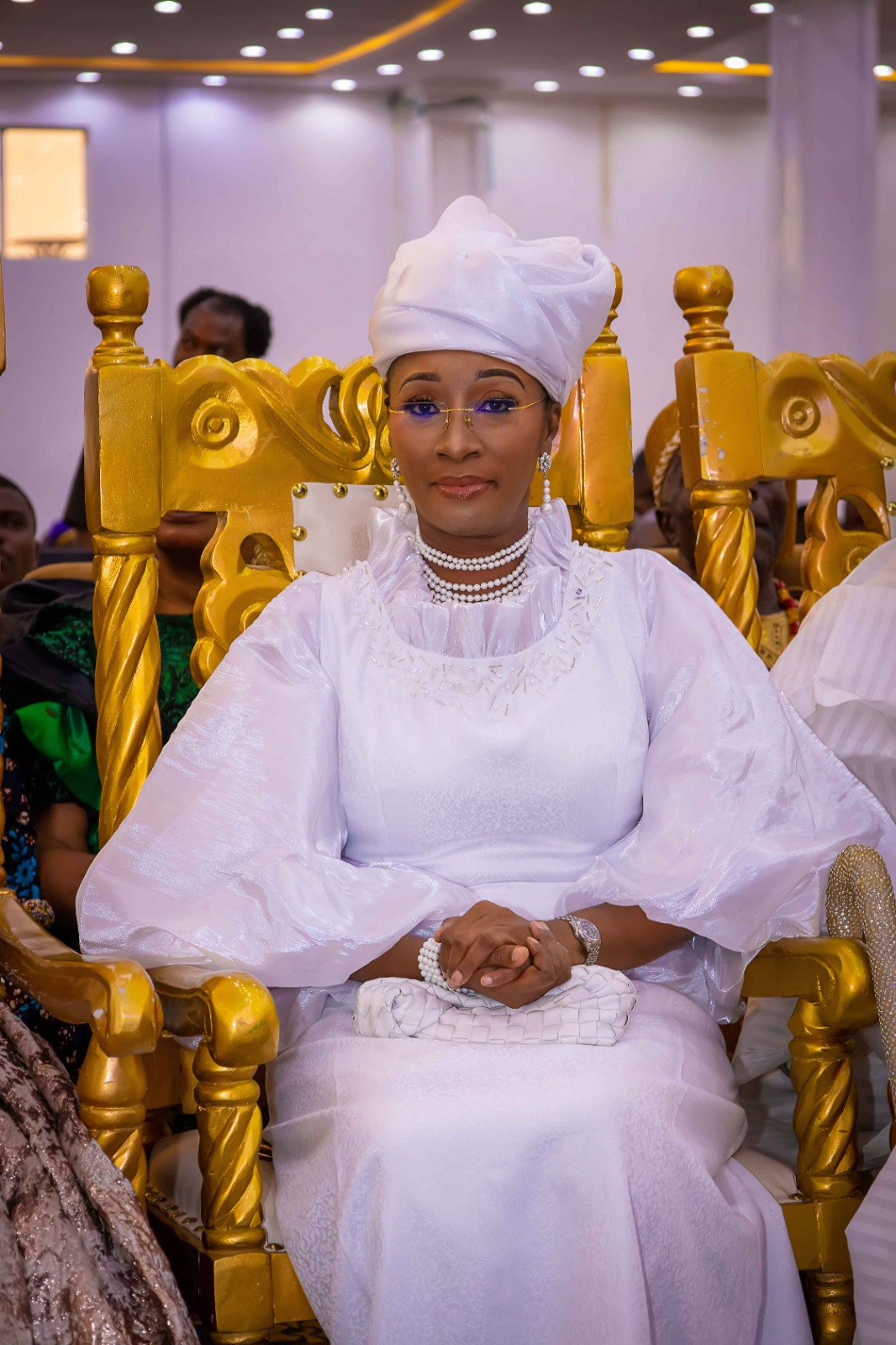
- Olori Aderonke Ademiluyi Ogunwusi
- Born: Princess Aderonke Ademiluyi; England, United Kingdom
- Occupations: Lawyer; Author; Fashion expert; Entrepreneur
- Years active: 2008–present
- Notable work: Africa Fashion Week

Queen aderonke Ademiluyi-Ogunwusi is a Nigerian fashion entrepreneur. She is a British-Nigerian Olori (Queen) of the Ife Kingdom, born to a scion of the royal family. She is the great-granddaughter of the late Ooni Ajagun Ademiluyi, 48th King of the Ile-Ife Kingdom in Southwest Nigeria. She is married to Ooni Adeyeye Enitan Ogunwusi, the 51st Ooni of Ife.

HM Queen Aderonke Ademiluyi-Ogunwusi is a London University alumni who graduated in Law and founded Africa Fashion Week London in 2011.

In 2014, she set up a sister platform in Nigeria, Africa Fashion Week Nigeria (AFWN). HM Queen Ronke Ademiluyi-Ogunwusi has produced over 20 fashion shows including the ‘Mayor of London's Africa on the Square’.

She produced The AFWL Business Fashion Forum. She is the co-founder of Fashion Future Online Courses in partnership with Henley Business School UK & Parsons Design School New York.

Moreover, she set up the AFWL Mentoring scheme for Black fashion students in the UK in partnership with Northampton University in the United Kingdom and below are some of the universities she has partnered with in Nigeria and the United Kingdom:-

- University of Northampton (Fashion Department) Mentoring scheme 2020, Live Event experience, backstage production AFWL2021, Grace Jones Meltdown Fest 2022.
- Henley Business School (School of Entrepreneurship), AFWL / Henley / Parsons Fashion Futures online learning program 2020/2021.
- Parsons School of Design & Technology AFWL / Henley / Parsons Fashion Futures online learning programme-2020/2021.
- Ravensbourne University (Fashion Department) – Live Event Experience at AFWL2021.
- London College of Fashion (Centre of Sustainable Fashion), Small Fashion Business Toolkit for Sustainability 2021/2022.
- University of West London (Fashion Department), Grace Jones Meltdown Festival 2022
- Obafemi Awolowo University ile Ife.

She is the co-author of the ‘African fashion book The Eyes of Originality & Creativity’. Queen Ronke Ademiluyi-Ogunwusi is the producer of the documentary ‘Ingenious Aso Oke Fabric of Nigeria’.

She is the founder of the ‘Adire Oodua Textile Training Hub’ in Ile Ife, South West Nigeria, an indigenous handmade hub that empowers women and youth, and trains them in the vocational skill of Adire making to enable them to earn a sustainable living for themselves. Her Africa Fashion Week Nigeria partnered with Afrinolly Creative Hub To Style MTN Y'ello Star, the largest mobile-based music reality show, where over 10,000 contestants competed to be the next Nigerian music star.
