= Dimeji Sodeke =

Nigerian author

Dimeji Sodeke is a Nigerian writer best known for his historical play Ooni Luwo: One Queen, Two Kings (2022). He has published an anthology of poems, The Big Black Theory and two novels: The Gods of My Parents and Dwelling in the Belly of the Beast.

== Writing ==
Sodeke's Ooni Luwo: One Queen, Two Kings which explores the life of Queen Luwo, was published on 2 June 2022 by Bablo publishers, a small press in Abeokuta, Nigeria. Bolu Babalola is the lead actor in the play of four languages: English, Yoruba, French, and Nigerian Pidgin. The Punch praised Sodeke's use of proverbs. In 2024, his novel, Dwelling in the Belly of the Beast, was published.
