= Olatubosun Oladapo =

Nigerian poet (born 1943)

- Born: Ọlátúbọ̀sún Ọládàpọ̀ September 19, 1943 (age 83); Ibadan, Oyo State, Nigeria
- Other names: Túbọ́sún Ọládàpọ̀, Ọlátúbọ̀sún Oládàpọ̀
- Education: University of Lagos
- Occupations: Poet; writer; record producer
- Parent(s): Daniel Akanji Oladapo, Segilola Oladapo

Ọlátúbọ̀sún Ọládàpọ̀, also known as Túbọ́sún Ọládàpọ̀, (born September 19, 1943) is a Nigerian poet, playwright and record producer. He is recognised for his contributions to Yorùbá oral literature.

== Work ==
Ọládàpọ̀ studied at St. Luke's Teachers' Training College in Ibadan, where he was recognised for his aptitude for drama, and sent on scholarship to the University of Lagos to pursue Yoruba Studies.

Ọládàpọ̀ worked for GbounGboun, a Yorùbá newspaper, before establishing Ọlátúbọ̀sún Records, a record label intended to produce and promote indigenous-language artists and folk poets within the Yorùbá region.

Ọládàpọ̀ said in an interview that he has produced 51 albums and recordings for around 200 artists under his label. Through his record label, he has helped preserve and disseminate traditional Yorùbá performance arts.

Ọládàpọ̀ said he has authored over 29 books, which are used in schools in Nigeria and abroad.

His poetry collections include Orin Odídẹrẹ́: Àjẹ́ Ọlọ́mọ; Àròyé Akéwì (1 and 2); and Àròfọ̀ Àwọn Ọmọdé. His plays Ògún Lákáayé and Ẹ̀gbádé Fáladé jointly won the Oxford University Press drama competition in 1970.

== Personal life ==
Ọládàpọ̀ has six children from his first marriage to Funmilayo Ọládàpọ̀ (née Oyebowale), and two others. His first granddaughter, Adeola Ogunwusi, is the daughter of the 51st Ooni of Ife, born to Ọládàpọ̀'s first daughter Omolara and Adeyeye Enitan Ogunwusi in 1994.
