= Adelekan Olubuse I =

Traditional ruler of Ife, 1894 to 1910

Adelekan Olubuse I was the 46th Ooni of Ife, a paramount traditional ruler of Ile Ife, the ancestral home of the Yorubas. In 1894, he succeeded Ooni Derin Ologbenla and in 1910, was succeeded by Ooni Adekola.

== Background ==
Olubuse was the founder of the House of Sijuwade which is a branch of the Ogboru Ruling House. Olubuse I was also the father of Omo-Oba Adereti Sijuade and grandfather of Oba Okunade Sijuwade the 50th Ooni of Ife.

== Historical significance ==
Adelekan Olubuse I was the first Ooni to vacate his palace since the inception of the Monarchy, said to date back to 500 B.C., the current dynasty of which is over eight hundred years old. Olubuse I was asked by the British governor, Sir William Macgregor, to travel to Lagos to settle a dispute and inform him regarding the status and well-being of his people in 1903.

This event is said to have been Ile-Ife's first encounter with the extent of British colonial power.

At this time, every Yoruba king along the Ooni's route to Lagos vacated their own palaces and towns, because the lesser kings refused to occupy their palaces while the god-king did not occupy his own.

== Religious significance ==
In the Ifá religion of the Yoruba people, the sacred city is layered inwards, from the city of Ife to the palace of the Ooni, to the Ooni himself. Ile-Ife is said, in the Ifa religion, to be the place where the gods descended to earth, the creator god, Ọbatala, and the first god-king of Ife, Oduduwa. It is said to be the center of the universe, and the seat of the king is the center of the city. All roads in Ile-Ife lead to the king's seat. His palace is the geographical center of their religion, and the most sacred space, while the Ooni himself is the object of worship, and the central figure of the religion. Jacob Olupona asserts that, for Westerners, the Ooni departing Ile-Ife is the same as God leaving heaven at the behest of a mortal. When asked by the British governor about the welfare of his people, the Ooni is said to have responded by telling him that they wept at his departure, and many awaited his return outside of the city. The governor replied that he did not believe the Ooni violated any traditions in leaving the city.
