= Adeyeye Enitan Ogunwusi =

Ooni of Ife since 2015

Ọjájá II CFR
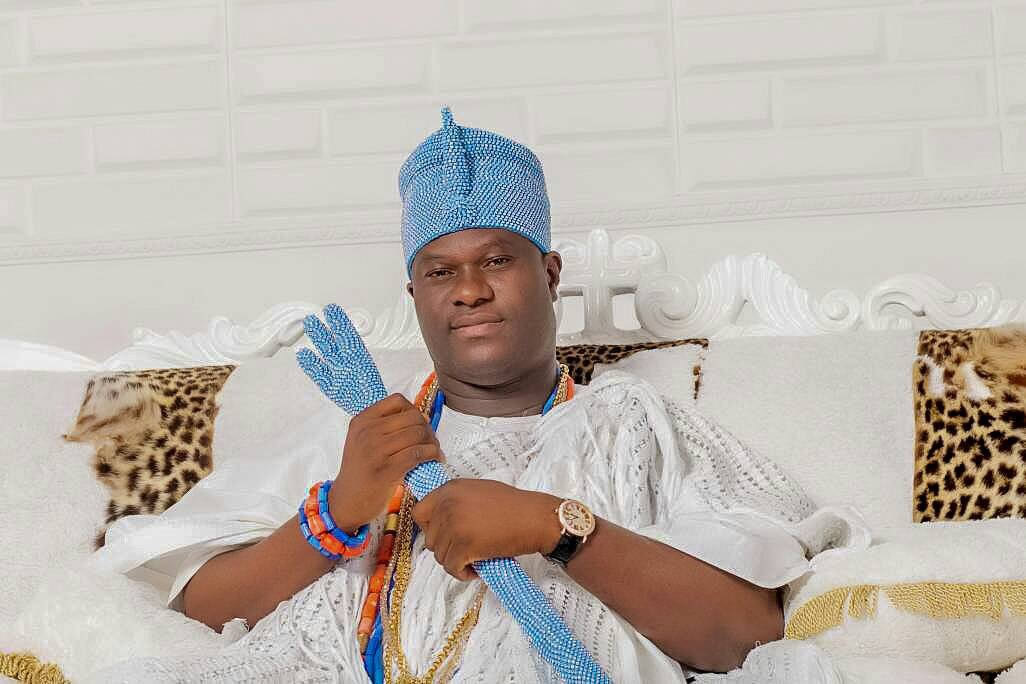

Ooni of Ife
- Reign: 26 October 2015 – present
- Coronation: 7 December 2015
- Predecessor: Olubuse II
- Born: Adeyeye Enitan Ogunwusi; 17 October 1974 (age 52); Ifẹ, Western State, Nigeria (now in Osun State, Nigeria)
- Spouses: Mariam Anako; Elizabeth Opeoluwa Akinmuda; Queen Tobi Phillips-Ogunwusi; Olori Ashley Afolasade Ogunwusi; Ronke Ademiluyi; Temitope Morenike Adesegun
- Issue: Princess Adeola Ogunwusi; Princess Adewamiwa Ogunwusi; Prince Tadenikawo Adesoji Aderemi Ogunwusi; Princess Adebukunmi; Princess Oreade Adesewa Ogunwusi; Prince Oreade Adesina Ogunwusi; Prince Ademakinwa Adefimihan Adebiyi Ogunwusi
Names
- Adéyẹyè Ẹnítán Bábátúndé Ògúnwúsi
- House: House of Giesi
- Dynasty: Giesi
- Father: Prince John Oluropo Ogunwusi
- Mother: Princess Sidikat Wuraola Ogunwusi

Oba Ọjájá II (born Adeyeye Enitan Ogunwusi, 17 October 1974) CFR is the Ooni and monarch of Ifẹ. He is the 51st traditional ruler. He became the Ooni after his predecessor Okunade Sijuwade in August 2015.

== Ancestry ==
Ọba Ọjájá II was born Prince Adeyeye Enitan of Giesi ruling house, one of the four royal families of the House of Oranmiyan. His paternal grandfather was Prince Joseph Olagbaju Adewole Ogunwusi, whose father, Adewole Ogunwusi, was a son of Ọba Ọ̀ráyẹ̀gbà (also known as Ooni Orarigba (or Orasigba) Ọjájá I, who was the 44th Ooni of Ife and ruled from 1878 to 1880. Through him, he is a direct descendant of Ooni Agbedegbede, who was a descendant of Ooni Giesi, the progenitor of the Giesi royal house, and thus a descendant of Ọọni Lajodogun. Lajodogun was a son of Ọọni Lajamisan (or Lajemisin), who was a grandson of the legendary founder of the Oyo Empire and Benin Empire, Oranmiyan, and a son or grandson of the first Ooni of Ife, Oduduwa; consequently Ọba Ọjájá II is a descendant of Odùdùwà, one of the early rulers of Ilé Ifẹ̀.

His birth was said to have been predicted years before he was conceived; hence, the name Enitan was given by his mother, Margaret Wuraola Ogunwusi, while his grandfather named him Adeyeye, which means "the crown befits the throne". He is the fifth of seven children.

== Education ==
Young Ogunwusi started his elementary education at Subuola Memorial Nursery and Primary School, Ibadan. He then proceeded to Loyola College, Ibadan, and later to St. Peters Secondary School, Ile-Ife, where he received his secondary school certificate (SSCE). He graduated as an accountant from The Polytechnic, Ibadan.

== Professional career ==
He is a member of the Institute of Chartered Accountants of Nigeria and an associate accounting technician.

Oba Ogunwusi is a certified member of the Institute of Directors. He is also a member of the Global Real Estate Institute.

He holds a number of honorary doctorate degrees: one in public administration from the University of Nigeria, Nsukka, and another in law from Igbinedion University.

He is the Chancellor of the University of Nigeria, Nsukka.

== Selection and coronation ==
Ooni Adeyeye Ogunwusi was selected from the Giesi ruling house of Ile-Ife, among indigenes who were also heirs to the throne, on 26 October 2015. He took his oath of office on 7 December that year. Ogunwusi is the spiritual leader of Ile and the entire Yoruba race, with the responsibility of making supplications to God and the Òrìṣà on behalf of his people and the world at large during annual festivals such as Olojo.

== Achievements ==
Shortly after his coronation, Ooni Ogunwusi met with the Alaafin of Oyo. The Oba is reported to be an advocate for the empowerment and emancipation of women and young people and a philanthropist. He has granted support over the years through the House of Oduduwa Foundation and, most recently, through the Hopes Alive Initiative.

== Personal life ==
Adeyeye Enitan Ogunwusi is the youngest of the three boys of Prince John Oluropo Ogunwusi (father) and Princess Sidikat Wuraola Ogunwusi (mother).

Ogunwusi has been involved in a number of publicized relationships.

He had his first child, Adeola Aanuolouwapo Ogunwusi (born in May 1994), with Omolara Olatubosun, the first daughter of Olatubosun Oladapo, in Ibadan when they were both teenagers. They are now co-parents. In November 2021, Omolara granted an interview in which she mentioned that Ogunwusi was an absentee father for the first years of their child's life. They were never married.

In 2008, Ogunwusi married Adebukola Bombata, from whom he separated in 2016.

In March 2016, he married Zaynab Otiti Obanor from Benin. In 2017, Zaynab Otiti filed for divorce from Ogunwusi, which was finalized in August 2017.

In October 2018, he married Prophetess Morenike Naomi Oluwaseyi. In December 2021, Morenike Naomi posted on Instagram that they were separated, but the statement was contradicted hours later by the palace. As of 2022 Naomi continued to play a prominent role in public life.

Between September and October 2022, the Ooni married six women, the first being Mariam Anako, an Ebira of Kogi State origin, on 6 September 2022. Then, Elizabeth Opeoluwa Akinmuda, an Ondo indigene, was betrothed to him on 7 September 2022. Thereafter, he married Tobi Phillips, an Okitipupa, Ondo State native, as his third wife on 9 October 2022. On 14 October 2022, he married Ashley Afolashade Adegoke, an Ile-Ife princess, as his fourth wife; and then, on 20 October 2022, he married yet another Ile-Ife Princess, Ronke Ademiluyi, as his fifth wife.

== Awards ==
In October 2022, the Nigerian national honour of Commander of the Order of the Federal Republic (CFR) was conferred on him by President Muhammadu Buhari.
