= Aiyepe Olode =

Aiyepe Olode Garage Olode
- LGA; Town
- Location within Nigeria
- Coordinates: 7°16′N 4°35′E
- Country: Nigeria
- State: Osun
- Local Government Areas of Nigeria: Ife South

Government
  - Type: Democratic
- Time zone: UTC+1 (WAT)
- 3-digit postal code prefix: 220

Aiyepe Olode is a town in Osun State, Nigeria, located on the road between Ondo and Ife.

== Etymology ==
Aiyepe Olode derives from the world "Hunters-Garage".

== History ==
Aiyepe Olode was built during the reign of Ademiluyi Ajagun (1910—1930). The settlement was established by Ajani Anibijuwon Omisore as a way to link the wilderness to other parts of Ife. Omisore made the hunters sign an agreement to pay royalties to him. The settlement grew in fame as Ife elites came in and joined Omisore, with each getting a partition of the wilderness. In 2021, electricity was promised to restored to the town after 10 years without electricity.
