= Adekola (Ooni) =

47th Ooni of Ife

Ooni Adekola was the 47th Ooni of Ife, a paramount traditional ruler of Ile Ife, the ancestral home of the Yorubas. He succeeded Ooni Adelekan Olubuse I and was succeeded by Ooni Ademiluyi Ajagun.
