= Iwo Kingdom =

- Traditional state
- Location within Nigeria
- Coordinates: 7°38′N 4°11′E
- Country: Nigeria
- State: Osun State

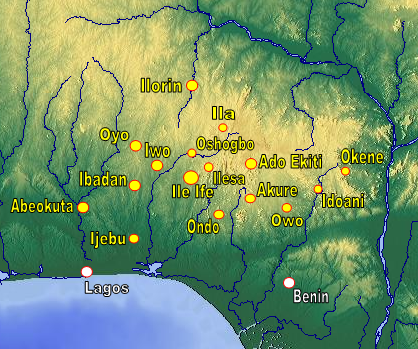
Historical Yoruba Cities

The Iwo Kingdom is a traditional state based on the city of Iwo in Osun State, Nigeria. The Yoruba kingdom, whose ruler is titled "Oluwo of Iwo", was established in the 14th century AD.

The Iwo people, like all other people of Yoruba stock are said to have originally belonged to Ile-Ife from where they migrated sometime in the 14th century. The earliest settlement was founded by Adekola Telu, son of the 16th Ooni of Ife, a female called Luwo Gbagida. The present city of Iwo was founded in the 16th or 17th century.

== Rulers ==
Rulers Iwo were:

Start	End	Ruler
1415	1505	Parin
1505	1541	Olayilumi
1550	1610	Adegunodo
1610	1673	Olufate Gbase
1673	1744	Alawusa
1744	1816	Ogunmakinde
1816	1906	Monmodu Ayinla Lamuye
1906	1909	Sunmonu Osunwo
1909	1929	Sanni Alabi Abimbola Lamuye
1929	1930	Seidu Adubiaran Lamuye
1930	1939	Abanikanda Amuda Akande
1939	1952	Kosiru Ande Lamuye
1953	1957	Raifu Ajani Adegoroye
1958	1982	Samuel Omotoso Abimbola
1992	2013	Asiru Olatunbosun Tadese
2015	present	Abdulrasheed Adewale Akanbi

9 November 2015 until present Oba Abdulrasheed Adewale Akanbi Ilufemiloye Telu 1 from Molaasan Royal family a sub.section of Gbaase ruling house was installed as the 16th Oluwo of Iwoland
