= Pierre Thiam =

Senegalese chef

Chef Pierre Thiam
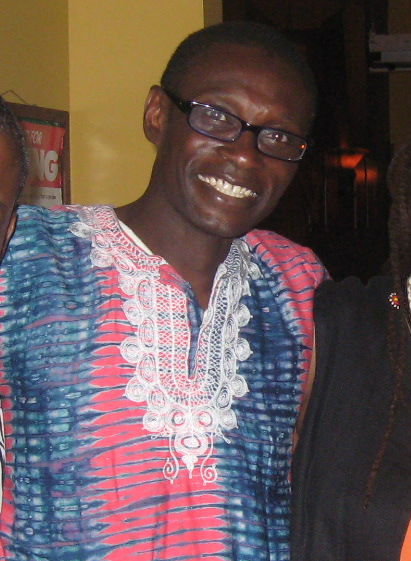
- Thiam at Le Grand Dakar in 2010
- Born: Dakar, Senegal
- Occupations: Chef; Business executive
- Known for: Restaurateur and author
- Notable work: Yolélé foods
- Title: Founder at Yolélé Foods and Teranga restaurants
- Spouse: Lisa Katayama
- Website: Pierre Thiam

Pierre Thiam is a Senegalese chef, author, and social activist. Thiam is best known for bringing West African cuisine to the world.

Based in California, Thiam is the founder of Pierre Thiam Group, which owns Teranga restaurants in New York City and Yolélé Foods. Yolélé, founded in 2017, is a food company centered on fonio, an ancient African super-grain. In addition, since 2015, Thiam has served as Executive Chef of the award-winning restaurant Nok by Alara in Lagos, Nigeria, and the Signature Chef of the Pullman Hotel in Dakar, Senegal. Thiam has authored several cookbooks, and in June 2024, he was inducted into the Cookbook Hall of Fame by the James Beard Foundation.

== Biography ==
Thiam was born and raised in Dakar, Senegal. He attended Cheikh Anta Diop University for an undergraduate degree in chemistry and physics. In 1988, the college was closed due to student strikes, and Thiam moved to the United States the following year to pursue his studies, but when he landed in New York City, he began working in restaurants. By introducing African-inspired foods, he worked his way up to chef de cuisine at Boom restaurant in New York in 1997.

== Business career ==
In 2001, Thiam opened his first restaurant, Yolélé, in Bed-Stuy Brooklyn in New York City, an African bistro with a menu inspired by traditional West African flavors with modern production techniques. He opened another Brooklyn location, "Le Grand Dakar'', in 2008. Following the closing of his Brooklyn operations, Thiam founded Pierre Thiam Group, a food & beverage company that promotes West African cuisines. Through his group, Thiam has opened Teranga restaurants with two New York City locations, and consulted as an executive chef for the launch of Nok by Alara in Lagos, he developed an African line of food products with his CPG company called Yolélé, and he collaborated with Brooklyn Brewery's Garrett Oliver on a series of wildly popular beers that incorporate African ingredients.

Since 2017, Thiam, through Yolélé Foods, has been known for producing and selling fonio products in the United States. Fonio is an ancient West African super-grain mostly imported from Mali, Togo, Burkina Faso, Ghana, and Senegal. Thiam believes that introducing the global market to the fonio grain is simultaneously supporting sustainable and traditional agriculture in West African nations. He positions his project as part of a larger movement to elevate the economic power of African farmers, who for centuries have been suppressed by the Western hegemony in the global food system.

== Social impact ==
Thiam is known for his philanthropic efforts and his commitment to using his platform to make a positive impact in the world. In 2022, Thiam with his wife Lisa started the non-profit L+P Foundation to "promote diverse, healthy, conscious food cultures across communities". He is also an advocate for the importance of supporting farmers and underused crops grown in Africa and promoting food sustainability. Through his company Yolélé, Thiam exports fonio to supermarkets across the United States, which has helped bring economic opportunities to the region in West Africa where the grain is grown. Fonio is one of the oldest cultivated grains and was considered to be a peasant's food in West Africa.

== Other considerations ==
Throughout his career as a chef, Thiam has helped to clear a pathway for authors and chefs such as Yewande Komolafe and Serigne Mbaye of Dakar NOLA in New Orleans. He has cooked for the King of Morocco, French President Emmanuel Macron, and Former UN Secretary-General Ban Ki Moon. He has authored four books including his latest, "Simply West African", published in 2023.

== Personal life ==
Thiam lives in California with his wife Lisa Katayama and their daughters Naia and Marie Aissé.

== Books ==
- Thiam, Pierre (2008). Recipes from the Heart of Senegal. Lake Isle Press. ISBN 1891105388.
- Thiam, Pierre; Sit, Jennifer (2015). Modern Senegalese Recipes from the Source to the Bowl. Lake Isle Press. ISBN 9781891105555.
- Thiam, Pierre (2019). The Fonio Cookbook An Ancient Grain Rediscovered. Lake Isle Press. ISBN 9781891105692.
- Thiam, Pierre; Katayama, Lisa (2023). Simply West African: Easy, Joyful Recipes for Every Kitchen. Clarkson Potter. ISBN 978-0593578025.

== Recognitions ==
- 2024: Thiam was inducted into the Cookbook Hall of Fame by the James Beard Foundation.
