= Africa Fashion Week London =

English fashion industry event

Africa Fashion Week (London) is an annual fashion week held in London, England. It was founded by HRM Queen Aderonke Ademiluyi-Ogunwusi.

In 2012 the Africa Fashion Week London team took a trip to Westfield Stratford City with the theme "Fun Day Flyering at Westfield".
