= Omo-Oba Adereti Sijuade =

Omo-Oba Adereti Sijuwade (1895 - 11 May 1945) was a member of the House of Sijuwade and a wealthy cocoa merchant. He was also the son of Adelekan Olubuse I - the 46th Ooni of Ife and the father of Oba Okunade Sijuwade (Olubuse II) - the 50th Ooni of Ife.

Omo-Oba Adereti Sijuwade had a thriving business in Iju, Alagbado and Abeokuta axis of the present-day Ogun State.
