= Ademiluyi Ajagun =

20th-century king of Ile-Ife

Adémilúyì Ajàgun
- Ọọni of Ilé-Ìfẹ̀
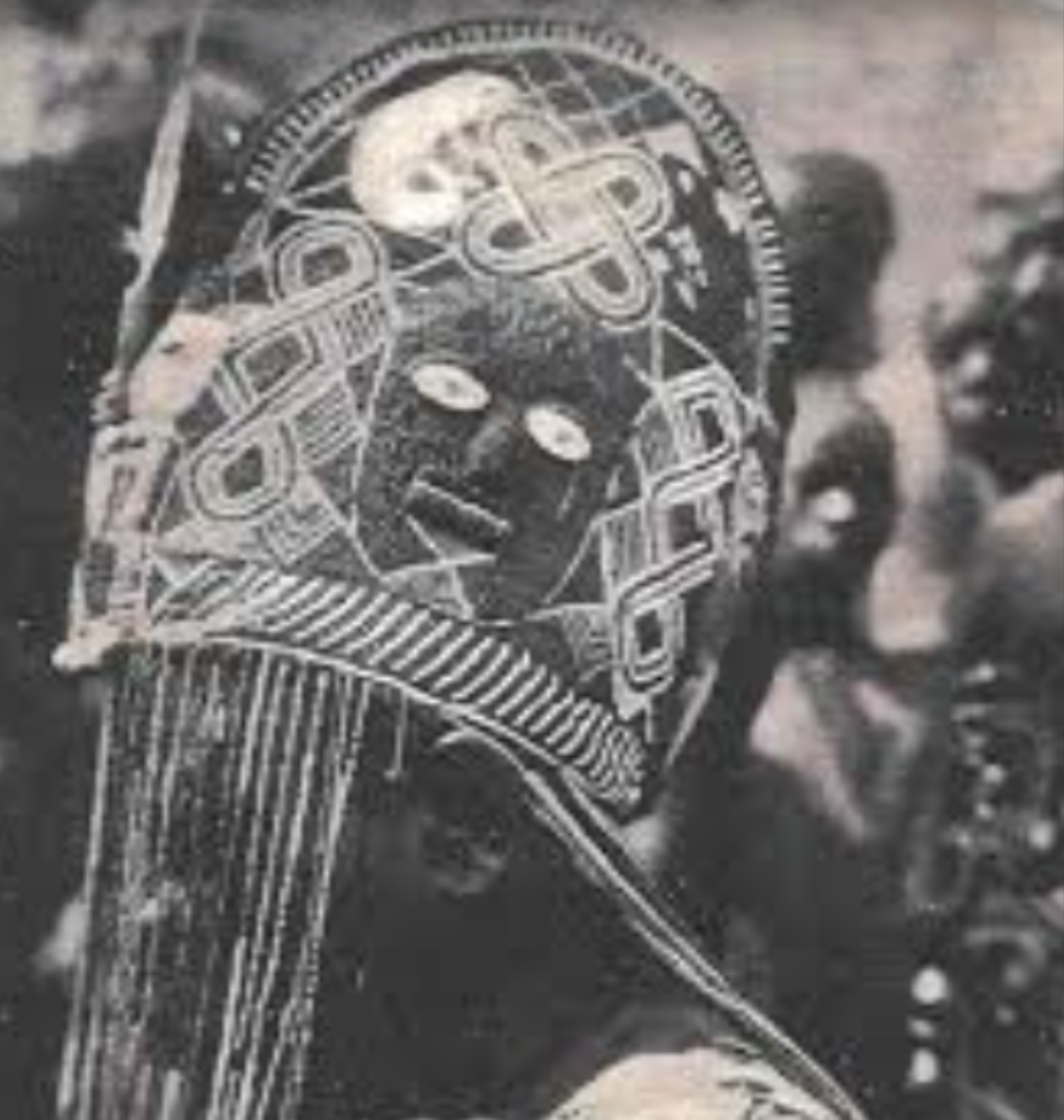
- Oba Adémilúyì wearing the Adé Aarè: the crown of creation

List of rulers of Ife
- Reign: 1910 – 24 June 1930
- Predecessor: Ooni Adekola
- Successor: Adesoji Aderemi
- Born: Adémilúyì Adémákin about 1860; Ile-Ife, Ife Kingdom
- Died: 24 June 1930 (aged about 70); Ile-Ife, British Nigeria
Names
- Adémilúyì, Ajàgun Lawáríkàn Àgbà ńlá bọfa
- House: House of Lafogido
- Dynasty: Oranmiyan
- Father: Prince Ademakin
- Mother: Princess Òbítọ́lá
- Religion: Ìṣẹ̀ṣe
- Occupation: Warrior; hunter; farmer

Ademiluyi Ajagun was the 48th Ooni of Ife, a paramount traditional king of Ile-Ife, the ancestral home of the Yorubas. He was one of the most feared kings and was highly respected in Africa and around the world. He succeeded Ooni Adekola and was succeeded by Ooni Adesoji Aderemi.

== Early life ==
Adémilúyì, meaning "my crown is honorable," was born around the year 1860 to the Royal House of Lafogido, one of the 4 houses of the Ọ̀rànmíyàn dynasty, descended from Oduduwa and Oranmiyan. He was also a descendant of the 31st Ọọni of Ìfẹ̀, Otutubíọ̀ṣun. He was born to Prince Adémákin and one of his wives, Òbítọ́lá. He was the second child of his parents, his siblings were Adésanyà, Jọláadépọ̀ (the only daughter), Adébọwálé, and Adéyẹyè.

== Reign ==
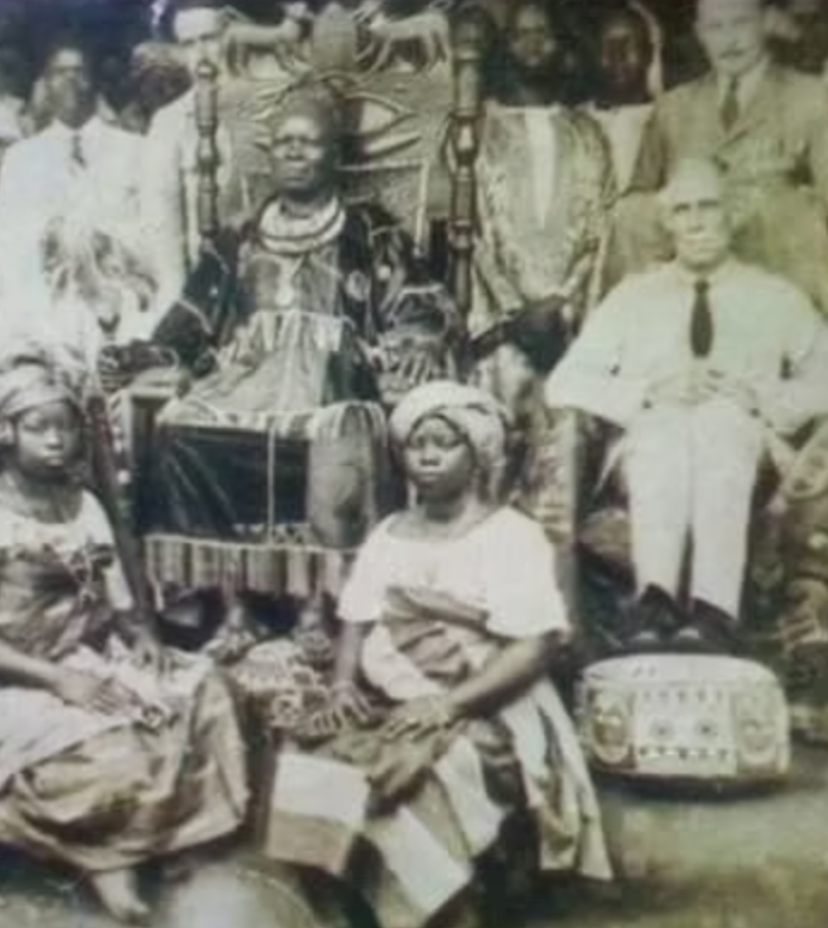
Ooni Adémilúyì with Captain Ross (a British explorer). Seated at late Ooni's footstool are his two daughters.

Ooni Adémilúyì was a feared warrior, hunter and a skilled farmer. He routinely went on dangerous expeditions in Èkìtì country where he killed many animals such as lions, leopards, elephants, and antelope. Due to his fearlessness and many other outstanding qualities, he eventually became the 48th Ọọni of Ìfẹ̀. In order to establish Ìfẹ̀'s dominance as the ancient capital of the Yoruba people, Adémilúyì pursued a close relationship with British rulers under the reign of George V. He became the Head of Native Administration in 1912, while in 1916 the Native Court Ordinance made him the President. During his reign, he also welcomed German ethnologist and archaeologist Leo Frobenius to Ìfẹ̀ where he did archaeological research and discovered the Bronze Head from Ife. This sculpture, like many other works of art from Nigeria, was taken without the permission of the rightful owners and somehow ended up in the British Museum—an issue Wole Soyinka pointed out in his 1986 Nobel Lecture. While Ooni Adémilúyì was a devout worshipper of the Yoruba religion, he supported the expansion of religious institutions throughout Ìfẹ̀. There were legendary beliefs that Ooni Adémilúyì was fond of using mystical powers, changing and transforming into wild animals, usually to a leopard-ambushing and killing his opponents. In fact, it was established that whenever the natives caught the glimpse or saw a wild animal crossing, they normally concluded that Ooni Adémilúyì was passing by on a vicious mission.

== Death and legacy ==
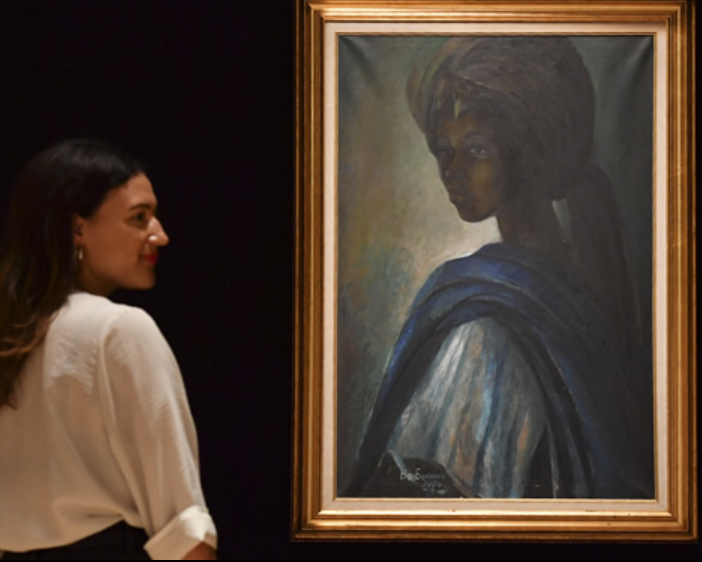
Princess Adetutu's elegant and iconic portrait "Tutu" by Ben Enwonwu sold for £1.2M at Bonhams Art Gallery in London

The king (Ọba) died on June 24, 1930, at about the age of 70. He was succeeded by Adesoji Aderemi. Ọba Ademiluyi had over 47 wives and is said to have had a range of 70 to over 100 children. One of his male children was Prince Okero Ademiluyi, and one of his female children was Princess Sijuade Adémilúyì from one of his wives Adefolawe. In popular culture, the painting called the "African Mona Lisa," is said to depict the niece of Ọba Ademiluyi - Princess Adetutu Ademiluyi. Among the most notable great-grandchildren of the king is Prince Dr. Ifẹ̀dáyọ̀ Emmanuel Adéyẹ́fà Ọlásùpọ̀, a Yoruba polymath and the founder of Figbox, and Ronke Ademiluyi-Ogunwusi, a Nigerian fashion entrepreneur who is also the 5th wife of the 51st Ooni of Ife.
