= Okunade Sijuwade =

50th Ooni of Ife

Olubuse II
- Oba Okunade Sijuwade
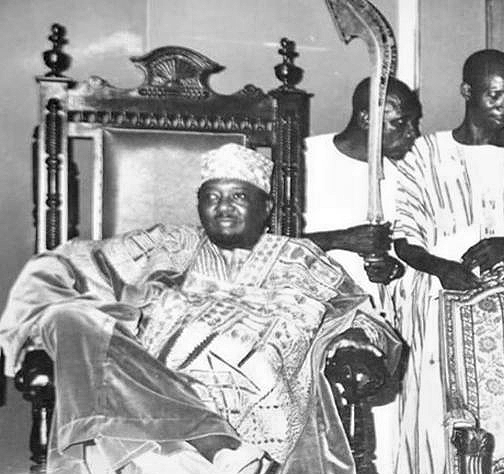

Ooni of Ife
- Reign: 6 December 1980 – 28 July 2015
- Predecessor: Adesoji Aderemi
- Successor: Adeyeye Enitan Ogunwusi
- Born: 1 January 1930; Ile-Ife, Southern Region, British Nigeria (now in Osun State, Nigeria)
- Died: 28 July 2015 (aged 85); London, United Kingdom
- Burial: Ile Oodua, Ile-Ife
- Spouse: Yeyeluwa Oyetunde Sijuwade Olori Morisola Sijuwade Olori Oladunni Sijuwade Olori Odunola Sijuwade
- Issue: List: Adetokunbo Sijuwade; Adekemi Alokolaro; Aderounmu Fadeyi; Adenike Amosu; Adegbite Sijuwade; Teniade Sijuwade; Adekunbi Opawunmi; Adewemimo Sijuwade; Oluwaseyi Odeyemi; Aderemi Sijuwade; Adenrele Fayose; Adedamilola Sijuwade; Adetoun Sijuwade; Adejumoke Sijuwade; Adeduntan Sijuwade; Adekanmi Sijuwade; Ademola Sijuwade; Ademitope Sijuwade
- House: House of Sijuwade
- Dynasty: Ogboru Dynasty
- Father: Omo-Oba Adereti Sijuade
- Mother: Yeyeolori Emilia Ofasesin Sijuwade
- Religion: Christian

Styles of Olubuse II
- Reference style: His Majesty
- Spoken style: Your Majesty

Oba Okunade Sijuwade CFR (1 January 1930 – 28 July 2015) was the fiftieth traditional ruler or Ooni of Ife from 1980 to his death in 2015, taking the regnal name Olubuse II. He was a traditional ruler of Ile-Ife, Yoruba town in Osun State, Nigeria. He was crowned on 6 December 1980 in a ceremony attended by the Emir of Kano, Oba of Benin, Amayanabo of Opobo and Olu of Warri, as well as by representatives of the Queen of the United Kingdom.

== Early life ==
Oba Okunade Sijuwade was born in 1930 to the ruling House of Sijuwade which is a fraction of the Ogboru ruling house, Ilare, Ile-Ife. His paternal grandfather was Ooni Adelekan Sijuwade - Olubuse I the 46th Ooni of Ife who ruled from 1884 - 1910. While his father was Omo-Oba Adereti Sijuade (1895 - 11 May 1949) and his mother was, Yeyeolori Emilia Ifasesin Sijuwade (nee Osukoti Adugbolu), from the town of Akure. He was a Christian and in November 2009 he attended the annual general meeting of the Foursquare Gospel Church in Nigeria accompanied by 17 other traditional rulers. He declared that he was a full member of the church and said all the monarchs who accompanied him would now become members. At his birthday celebration two months later, the Primate of the Anglican Communion described Sijuwade as "a humble monarch, who has the fear of God at heart”.

== Education ==
Oba Okunade Sijuwade or Prince Okunade Sijuwade as he was then called started his elementary education at Igbedin School, Abeokuta from where he proceeded to Abeokuta Grammar School under the governance of the well-known educationalist Reverend I O Ransome-Kuti, who was the principal of the school. Upon leaving Abeokuta Grammar School, Oba Okunade Sijuwade transferred to Oduduwa College in Ile-Ife before attending Northampton Technical College in the United Kingdom to study business management.

== Business career ==
He worked for three years in his father's business, then for two years with the Nigerian Tribune, first as a reporter then a sales executive before going to university. By the age of 30 he was a manager in A.G Leventis, a Greek-Nigerian conglomerate. In 1963 he became Sales Director of the state-owned National Motors in Lagos. After spotting a business opportunity during a 1964 visit to the Soviet Union, he formed WAATECO a company to distribute Soviet-built vehicles and equipment in Nigeria, which became the nucleus of a widespread business empire. He also invested in real estate in his hometown of Ile Ife. By the time Sijuwade was crowned Ooni in 1980 he had become a wealthy man. Shortly after becoming the 50th Ooni of Ife, Oba Okunade Sijuwade founded Sijuwade Group, which he was the chairman of. The conglomerate operates in several sectors including oil and gas, infrastructure, real estate, industrials, and hospitality. The company holds partnerships with several multinational companies such as Centrica, Equinor (formerly Statoil), CCC, Eser and RCC (Reynolds Construction Company) and has executed over $2 billion worth of contracts and projects in Nigeria. In 2016, Oba Okunade Sijuwade was named in the Panama Papers.

Sijuwade owned several residential properties in Nigeria and the United Kingdom including Chester Terrace, Grosvenor Square, and a country home in Burnham, Buckinghamshire.

== Supremacy disputes ==
When Sijuwade became Ooni of Ife in December 1980 he inherited an ongoing dispute over supremacy between the obas of Yorubaland. In 1967 a crisis had been resolved when Chief Obafemi Awolowo was chosen as the leader of the Yoruba. In 1976 the Governor of Oyo State, General David Jemibewon, had decreed that the Ooni of Ife would be the permanent chairman of the State Council of Obas and Chiefs. Other Obas led by the Alaafin of Oyo, Oba Lamidi Adeyemi said the position should rotate. The dispute calmed down when Osun State was carved out of Oyo State in August 1991, but ill will persisted. In January 2009 Sijuwade was quoted as saying that Oba Adeyemi was ruling a dead empire (the Oyo Empire, which collapsed in 1793). Adeyemi responded by citing "absurdities" in Sijuwade's statements and saying the Ooni "is not in tune with his own history". Adeyemi, Permanent Chairman of the Oyo State Council of Obas and Chiefs, was conspicuously absent from a meeting of Yoruba leaders in April 2010. Towards the end of 2009 a more local dispute between the Ooni, the Awujale of Ijebuland and the Alake of Egbaland was finally resolved. Sijuwade traced the dispute back to a falling out between Obafemi Awolowo and Ladoke Akintola during the Nigerian First Republic, which had led to a division between the traditional rulers. He noted that the traditional rulers were an important unifying force in the country during the illness of President Umaru Yar'Adua. In February 2009, Sijuwade helped mediate in a dispute over land ownership between the communities of Ife and Modakeke, resolved in part through the elevation of the Ogunsua of Modakeke as an Oba. The new Oba, Francis Adedoyin, would be under the headship of Oba Okunade Sijuwade.

== Personal life ==
Oba Okunade Sijuwade had 4 wives and 20 children in total. His wives were:

- Yeyeluwa Oyetunde Sijuwade, Oba Okunade Sijuwade’s first wife and the first Yeyeluwa of Ife. She was the mother to Prince Adetokunbo Sijuwade.
- Olori Morisola Sijuwade, Oba Okunade Sijuwade’s second wife and the second Yeyeluwa of Ife from 1986 after Yeyeluwa Oyetunde Sijuwade’s death.
- Olori Oladunni Sijuwade, Oba Okunade Sijuwade’s third wife and the daughter of the very popular politician Chief Adedamola Harold-Sodipo.
- Olori Odunola Sijuwade, a princess of Ila-Orangun and the daughter of the revered Ila-Orangun, Oba William Ayeni.

== Political activities ==
In July 2008, Sijuwade said he was concerned that Yoruba socio-cultural groups such as Afenifere and the Yoruba Council of Elders were taking partisan positions in politics. In January 2010 he attended a meeting of the Atayese pan-Yoruba group, which issued a call for a truly federal constitution in which the different nationalities in Nigeria would have greater independence in managing their affairs.

Celebrating his 80th birthday in January 2010, Sijuwade conferred Chieftainship titles on a number of politicians and their wives, including Imo State governor Ikedi Ohakim, Oyo State governor Otunba Adebayo Alao-Akala, Niger State governor Babangida Aliyu, Abia State governor Theodore Orji, Senators Jubril Aminu and Iyabo Obasanjo-Bello and others. Guests at the ceremony included former Nigerian President Olusegun Obasanjo, President of the Republic of Benin Dr Thomas Boni Yayi and King Otumfuo Osei Tutu II, the Asantehene of Kumasi, Ghana. When Peter Obi, controversial governor of Anambra State, was reelected on 7 February 2010, Sijuwade congratulated him, saying his victory was the will of God. In August 2010 he mediated in the ownership dispute between Oyo and Osun states concerning Ladoke Akintola University, calling a meeting attended by Prince Olagunsoye Oyinlola, governor of Osun State, Otunba Adebayo Alao-Akala, governor of Oyo State and the Permanent Secretary of the Federal Ministry of Education which resulted in an action plan. Sijuwade and Governor Oyinlola were said to have the power to decide who became the next Osun State governor. In February 2010 Sijuwade and 16 other traditional rulers endorsed Senator Iyiola Omisore as candidate for Osun State governor in the 2011 elections. Later there were allegations that Senator Omisore had fallen out with Sijuwade due to his failure to maintain support for Omisore's bid to become governor. Omisore denied the allegations, saying that the relationship was cordial and that "Ooni is our king and we should preserve and respect him as well". In June 2010 Sijuwade and other traditional rulers endorsed the candidature of Fatai Akinade Akinbade for governor.

== Death controversy ==
He was reported dead on 28 July 2015 in a London hospital at the age of 85 but the news was refuted by the Royal traditional council of Ile Ife who claimed that he is alive and in good health. His death away was officially announced by the Ife High Chiefs when they visited the governor of Osun State in Nigeria, Rauf Aregbesola, on 12 August 2015 at the governor's office in the state capital, Osogbo. The Nigerian President Muhammadu Buhari expressed condolences to his family on his death.

== See also ==
- List of rulers of Ife
