= List of rulers of Ife =

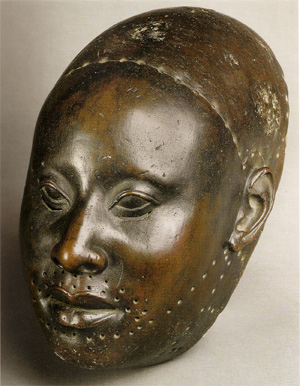
Yoruba Ife bronze casting of a King, Nigeria c. 1300

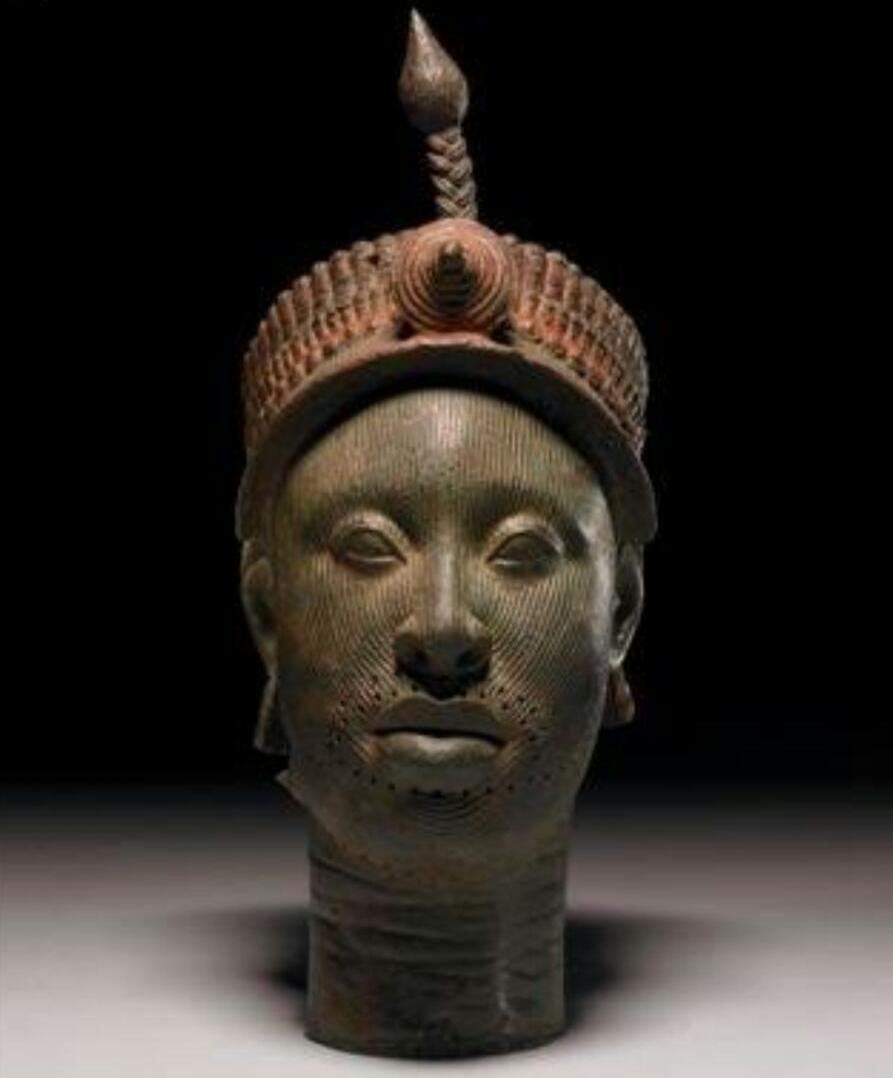
Ife bronze casting of a King, dated around twelfth century

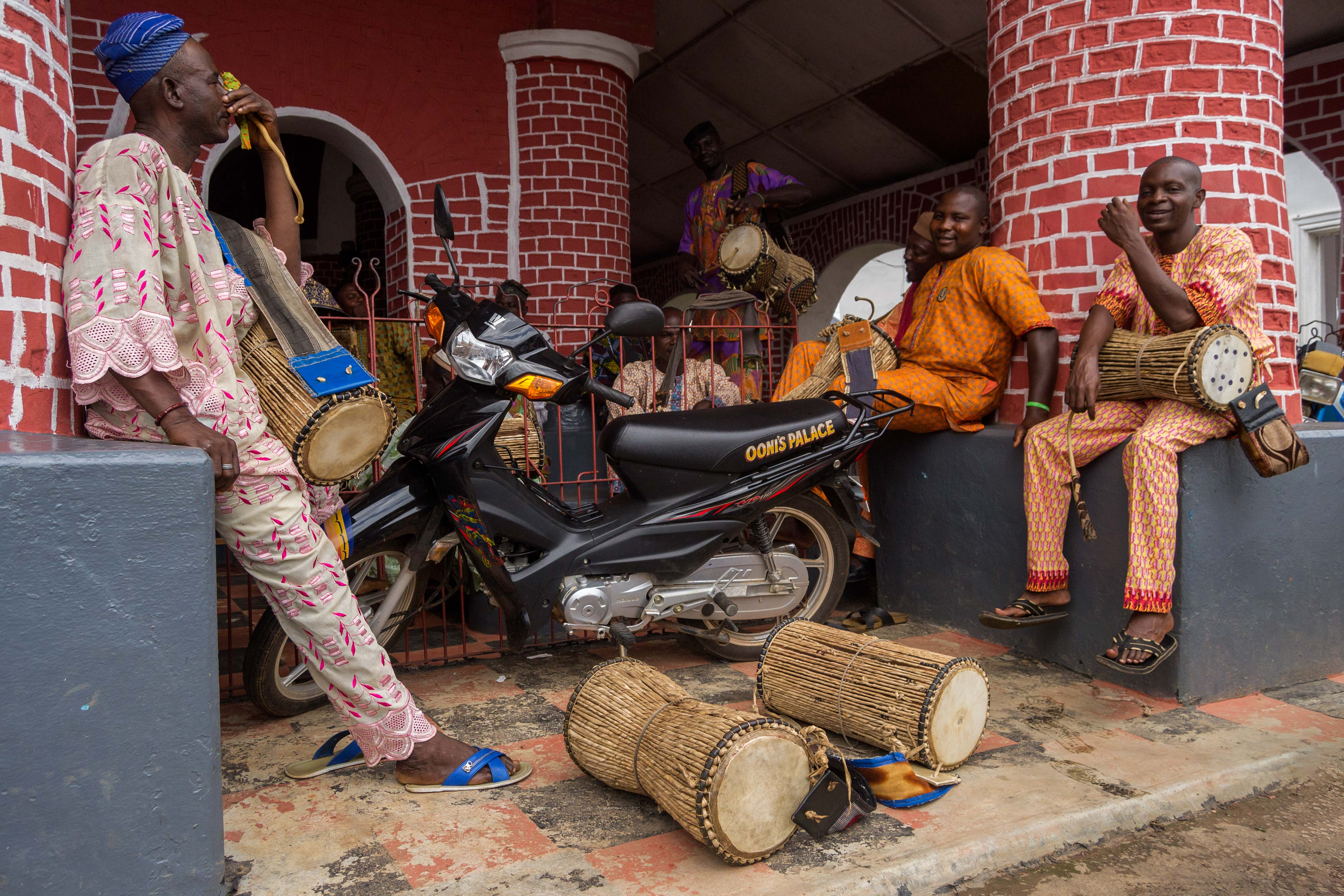
Drummers at Ooni's Palace

The Ooni of Ile-Ife (Ọọ̀ni of Ilè-Ifẹ̀) is the traditional ruler of Ilé-Ifẹ̀. The Ooni dynasty existed before the reign of Oduduwa which historians have argued to have been between the 7th-9th centuries A.D.

After the demise of Oduduwa and Ogun’s fail attempt to take over the throne, Oduduwa's support base dispersed out of Ile-Ife. Another account, but not in tandem with existing evidences, states that Ogun purposely sent all Oduduwa's children on different journeys to effect Yoruba territory expansion.

Whatever the case, after Oduduwa's short reign, Ọbàtálá re-emerged as the king of Ile-Ife and the throne was rotated between Obatala and Obalufon houses until the return of Oranmiyan who briefly interrupted the succession pattern. Popular history identifies Ooni Lajamisan to have been a son or grandson of Oranmiyan. Meanwhile Ife tradition remains unclear about his ancestry. Lajamisan is often said to have opened the modern Ife history.

Prior to the 20th century, the succession pattern of the Ooni was fluid. However, with the modernity that came with colonialism, the succession pattern was structured to the existing four actual Ruling Houses, which were named from Ooni Lafogido, Ooni Osinkola, Ooni Ogboru and Ooni Giesi. The structure has been heavily critiqued for being influenced by politics, personal vendetta and obfuscation of history. For instance, while the first three were said to have been sons of Ooni Lajodogun, certain figures regarded as siblings of Ogboru have either been completely excluded or subsumed. The current Ooni is Adeyeye Enitan Ogunwusi Ojaja II (born October 17, 1974).

== Influence on king making ==
The filling of the stool of a deceased Ooni of Ife is not a simple local affair as it may seem but has national ramifications. Since Ife is regarded as the cradle of the Yoruba, this town has always been the leading religious center of the Yoruba people. But other roles are also involved. Especially, the Ooni of Ife is often presented as the highest ranked Oba or, even more, as the natural chairman of the Council of Yoruba Chiefs. The rules to fill a vacant stool are the Chiefs Law Cap 25 Laws of Osun State (modified 2002). And the Declaration made in 1980 by the traditional Chiefs under Section 4(2) of this Chief Law. In 1957, the former Declaration recognised four ruling houses and established the following order of rotation:

1. The Oshinkola House, Iremo (present) [as of 1957]
2. The Ogboru House, Ilare
3. The Giesi House, More
4. The Lafogido House, Okerewe

In 1977, references to locations in Ife were suppressed. And the January 1980 Declaration confirmed everything just before the death of Adesoji Aderemi. These families are tagged in column desc, as sourced from Vanguard for Lafog, Osink, Ogbor, Giesi.

In 2015, it was the turn of the Giesi Family, as confirmed by the Ife kingmakers. Nevertheless:

- Olakunle Aderemi (leader of Osinkola) said that, despite having produced Adesoji Aderemi (1930-1980), Osinkola house deserved to produce the new King because the family produced the fewest of the Ooni among the four ruling houses. Ife Chieftaincy Declaration of 1980 technically throws open the contest for filling the stool of Ooni, he added.
- The Lafogido house went to court, describing the Chieftaincy Declaration as unfair. Lafogido house had been constantly marginalized in chieftaincy reviews in Ife since 1957 they said. 14 Oonis have been enthroned from Lajodogun and only 8 from Lafogido ruling house they added.
- Adetowo Aderemi (of Osinkola) got even further, faulting the 1957 and 1980 Ife Traditional Council Declarations, describing them as a fraud. That they are against the customary law of succession of the Ife people, he said. He also faulted the inclusion of Giesi Ruling House among eligible royal families to fill the stool of Ooni, saying that Giesi was only invited to complete the term of Ogboru, not being from the male lineage with right to the stool as the grandson of Ogboru.

Finally, Adeyeye Enitan Ogunwusi, from the Giesi house, was elected October 26, 2015.

== Aggregated list ==
LB	Og	86	85	76	75	54	LA	date	name	Notes	nickname	comments
0	0	0	0	0	0	0	0		Obatala	He was an important ruler of Ile-Ife whose authority was challenged through an usurpation	Olufe, Olofin Iwase, Oseremagbo	During the conflict that followed the usurpation of his leadership, he was able to retain the support of the larger number of the different power-blocs within Ile-Ife.
0	0	0	0	0	0	0	0		Odùduwà	Regarded as Olofin		He had a turbulent and short reign. Was upstaged by Obatala.
1	1	1	1	1	1	1	1	1	Obatala			Seized power at the fall of Oduduwa and re-emerged as the king of Ife. He began the unification process of the previously semi-autonomous hamlets. His strong alliance with Osangangan Obamakin led to the rotation of power between the groups headed by both of them respectively
2	2							2	Ogun			Compeer of Obatala. A great warrior and hunter who attempted to seize power but was ousted by Ọbalùfọ̀n Ògbógbódirin a.k.a Osangangan Obamakin
4	4		2	2	2	2	2	2	Ọbalùfọ̀n Ògbógbódirin		Osangangan Obamakin	He lived and reigned for an unusually long period of time.
5		5	3	3	3	3	3	3	Ọbalùfọ̀n Aláyémọrẹ	S Obalufon I	Regarded as the First Ooni and carried out the complete unification of Ile-Ife	Became the Ooni after his father's death while Oranmiyan was on sojourn or exile. Abdicated after a stiff confrontation with Oranmiyan who returned to Ile-Ife.
6	5	4			4	4	4	4	Ọ̀raǹmíyaǹ	S Ogun	Odede=title ?	A son of Ogun or oduduwa through a Lakange whom Oduduwa would later seize. Said to have lived between 1200 and 1300 A.D. Eweka, the Omo n'Oba of Benin, Ajaka and Sango the Alaafin of Oyo were his sons. It was not clear, who the original father of òrànmíyàn was.
							4.5	4.5	Ọbalùfọ̀n Aláyémọrẹ	Onigbomore		Back to the throne after Oranmiyan's death. Reigned at the same time as Dada, Alaafin of Oyo.
7	6							4.7	Ayétise			
					5	5	5	5	Àwórókọ̀lọ̀kín			
		6	4	4			5.5	5.5	Lajuwa (usurper)		Okoo olori-ko-yun-ajo (A king's wife, called olorì is forbidden to travel)	Head messenger. Said to have usurped the throne at the death of Aworokolokin.
				6		7	6	6	Ẹ̀fọ̀n Ayíóyè		Ogbolaajuree (no matter how ripe the okra is, it cannot be older than itself).	
			5	5	6	6	7	7	Ajímúda Ẹkùn			
							8	8	Láamórò Ògìján			From Molodo compound, Ilode.
							9	9	Ọ̀sẹgànderùkù		Oseganderuku (He who turns the forest into dust).	
			6	7				9.5	Otaran			
						8	10	10	Ọyẹ́		Okukuyewu Ilode	
				8		10		10.7	Lamoro			
8	7	7	10	12	7	15	11	11	Lájẹ̀misìn	Son of Aiyetise/Latise? Descendant of Oranmiyan? Product of an intermarriage between Alayemore and Oranmiyan offspring?		Modern Ife history began with his reign which was unusually long.
			7	9		11	12	12	Lárọ́ọ̀ká			From Moore. Claimed to be a descendant of Ọ̀ranmiyan and Ancestor of Giẹsi. There is one common saying: Larooka built the town hall and Giẹsi constructed a support for it at the bottom.
							13	13	Òwódò			From Okerewe, Ife.
			8			12	14	14	Arírere Ọ̀kínwẹ			
						9	15	15	Ọtaataa		Ọtaataa-kiran	From Owodo. Alade yokun-saayo-lorun.
			9	10		13	16	16	Lápeléke		Oro-wuye-oluku-eti	
				11		14		16.2	Oluwo			
							17	17	Otújàbíòjò		(who scatters the market like rainfall)	
		9					18	18	Lúwo Gbàgìdá		Ayare, Akọsulogbe	From Owode compound, Okerewe. Descendant of Otaataa (#15). She was married to Chief Ọbalọran of Ilode and became the mother of Adekola Telu, the founder of Iwo town. Was the only woman Ooni. .
9	8						19	19	Lájódogun	S Lajamisan		From Igbodo, Okerewe. Descendant of Lajamisan.
							20	20	Lafogun			From Igbodo. Descendant of Lajodoogun.
10	9	8	11				21	21	Láfogído	D_Lajodogun		From Igbodo. Descendant of Lajodoogun. Prominent among his children were: (1) Otutu biosun ? (2) Okiti #26.6 (3) Olojo Agbele #30 (4) Adagba #36.4 (5) Wunmọnijẹ #41 (6) Lugbade #26.7 (7) Lumobi #24.2 (8) Yeyelueko, mother of Singbunsin Yanningan ?
11	10							21.01	Odidimọdẹ Rogbẹṣin	D_Lajodogun		
12								21.02	Àwórókọ̀lọ̀kín	D_Lajodogun		
13	11							21.03	Ẹkun	D_Lajodogun		
14	12							21.04	Ajímúdà	D_Lajodogun		
			12					21.1	Luciro			
15	13	10	13					21.2	Gboo ni jio	D_Lajodogun		
16	14	11	14					21.4	Okunlajosin	D_Lajodogun		
17	15	12	15					21.6	Adégbàlú	D_Lajodogun		
		13	16					21.8	Odidi Egbesin			
18		14	17				22	22	Ọ̀sińkọ́lá	D_Lajodogun		Descendant of Lajodoogun.
			18					22.2	Lagbuja			
			19					22.3	Omoropo			
		15						22.4	Lagunja			
19	16	19	21				23	23	Ògbórú	D_Lajodogun		Descendant of Lajodoogun. Ogboruu was deposed after reigning for 70 years. Six princes were appointed successively within a year and all died without completing the coronation. Finally, Ogboruu agreeded to bless Giesi, a son of his daughter Mọropo
20	17	20	22				24	24	Gíẹ̀sí	D_Lajodogun		Maternal grandson of Ogboruu
21	18							24.1	Luwo	D Lafogido		
22	19							24.2	Lúmobi	D of Lafogido		
25	22	16						24.3	Lagunja	D_Lajodogun		
26	23	17						24.4	Larunka	D_Lajodogun		
27	24	18	20					24.6	Ademilu	D_Lajodogun		
	25							24.8	Ọ̀sińkọ́lá			
							25	25	Adéjinlé			Descendant of Owodo #13 and ancestor of Abeweela #42
							26	26	Àróganganlàgbo			From Akuyi.
24	21	21						26.3	Ojee lokun binrin	D_Lajodogun		
28	26							26.5	Ọmọgbogbo	D_Lajodogun		
30	28	24						26.6	Adejinlẹ	D Lafogido		
34	32	25					27	27	Aríbiwọsọ	D Lafogido	Aribiwoso-lode-Akuyi	From Akuyi.
							28	28	Ṣojuolu Ọ̀gbọnsẹ̀gbọndẹ			From Owodo compound.
23	20	22					29	29	Agbẹ̀dẹ̀gbẹdẹ	D_Lajodogun		Descendant of Giẹsi.
31	29	26					30	30	Ọlọ́jọ́	D Lafogido	Agbele-wojuorun-yanmongi	From Okerewe.
32	30							30.3	Okiti	D Lafogido		
33	31							30.6	Lúgbadé	D Lafogido		
							32	32	Ajífadéseré			
							33	33	Otuko			
							34	34	Odidimọdẹ Rogbẹṣin			Ancestor of Mọlodo, Awura and Lami (?,?,?)
29	27	23					35	35	Ajílà Oòrùn	D_Lajodogun		From Moore. Descendant of Agbedegbede #29
35	33	27					31	35.5	Ọ̀sinínladé Òtutùbiọ̀ṣun	D Lafogido		Descendant of Lafogido.
							36	36	Abigboọla			
36	34							36.4	Àdàgbá	D Lafogido		
37	35	28					37	37	Òjìgìdìrí	D_Lajodogun	Lambuwa.	From Akuyi ward, Ife.
38	36	29					38	1770−1800	Akínmóyèró	D Lafogido	Iriko dunle biojo (the mist cannot wet the ground like rain).	
39	37	30					39	1800−1823	Gbániárè	D_Lajodogun	Gbadioro at x86	From Ilare ward, Ife.
40	38	31					40	1823−1835	Gbégbáajé	D_Lajodogun		
41	39	32					41	1835−1839	Wúnmọníjẹ̀	D Lafogido	Wunmo-nije-soogun	A descendant of Lafogido.
42	40	33					42	1839−1849	Adégúnlẹ̀ Abewéilá	D Lafogido	Abewe-ila gberengedẹ (spread out like the leaf of the okra plant).	He is said to have died at about 35 years of age.
43	41	34					43	1849−1878	Degbin Kùmbúsù	D Lafogido		The first fall of Ife occurred during his reign in 1849.
44	42	35					44	1878−1880	Ọ̀ráyẹ̀gbà Ọjaja	D_Lajodogun	Ayikiti-ninu-aran (rolls around in velvet fabric).	Imposed by the Ibadan.
45	43	36					45	1880−1894	Dérìn Ọlọ́gbénlá	D Giesi		Ooni-elect, who never came to be crowned at Ife before he died at Okeigbo. During his reign, the second fall of Ife occurred in 1882.
46	44	37					46	1894−1910	Adélékàn Olúbòse I	D Ogboru	Eriogun, Akitikori, Ebitikimopiri	First Ooni to reign in Ile Ife after the end of Ekitiparapo war. The evacuation of Modakeke occurred during his reign.
47	45	38					47	1910−1910	Adékọ́lá	D_Lajodogun	Lawarikan, Agbejanla-bofa.	From Akuyi. An Ooni-elect for only two months, June–July 1910.
48	46	39					48	1910−1930	Ademiluyi Ajagun	D Lafogido		He was a descendant of Otutubiosun #31. During his reign the Modákẹ́kẹ́ people returned to Ifẹ̀ in 1921.
49	47	40					49	1930−1980	Adesoji Aderemi	D Osinkola	Ainla, Ọmọ Adekunbi Ipetu	From Akuyi. death=3/7/1980. Doubled as Governor of the Western Region of Nigeria. He was a descendant of Ojigidiri Lambuwa (#37)
50	48	41					50	1980−2015	Olubuse II	D Ogboru		Grandson of Adelekan Olubuse. death=28/7/2015. Communal clashes between Modakeke and Ife people was reignited during his reign. Sijuade Olubuse II banned the sale of the Adetunji's book in ife town because it included a story pertaining to his grandfather Adélẹkàn Olúbùse, which he did not want publicized
51							51	2015−	Adeyeye Enitan Ogunwusi Ojaja II	D Giesi		

Some accounts consider Òránfè as the first ruler of ifè.

== Sources ==
=== Print sources ===
1. Ojo Bada 1954 quotes 15 names for the Oduduwa to Lajamisan period. See column 5.
2. Chief Fabunmi 1975 quotes 7 names for the same period. See column 6. Chief Fabunmi is known for his Historical notes.
3. Chief Fasogbon 1976 quotes 12 names for this period. See column 7.
4. Chief Awosemo 1985 quotes 22 names from Oduduwa to Giesi. See column 8.
5. Eluyemi 1986 quotes 41 names from Oduduwa to nowadays. See column 9.

Sources for the 50 items A list

1. Awoyinfa, Dele, 1992 pages 30–35.
2. Prince L. A. Adetunji 1999, pages 70–77. The prince, from the Giesi family, was one of the contenders for the 2015 designation. See column LA.

Sources for the 50 items B list

1. Ologundu 2008, pages 58–59. Lists 48 names, that are the B list, except from Obalufon Alayemore (#5) and Aworokolokin (#12). Moreover, Osinkola (#18) is at #25 (strange place)
  Araba Adedayo Ologundu was a native of Ile-Ife, Nigeria. See column Og.
2. Lawal 2000, page 21 (nevertheless, this book is Google described as a 19 pages book !). See column LB.

=== Web sources ===
1. Source 2015.
2. Leadership.ng 2015., 2015. No references are given. One typo: Ademiluyi Ajagun (1930-19800).
3. Ooni Ojaja II web site, 2016 quotes 51 names. Same as list B, differs only by the diacritics. No references are given. This list was already in use before 2015.

=== Methodology for compiling sources ===
==== Consolidation at the price of the diacritics ====
The Yoruba language is written nowadays with an alphabet that uses many diacritic signs. But this alphabet was not strictly codified before being integrated as one of the components of the modern Pan-Nigerian alphabet (1981). Like for the McCune–Reischauer system for Korean, many authors of the West have used this alphabet with some laziness, omitting many of the diacritics for various reasons, or even ignoring all of them. But, while poor romanizations of Korean can be fixed by comparing with the hangul/hanja original text, this cannot be done with the Yoruba oral sources of the past. The romanizations of the proper nouns became dependent on the pronunciation of a specific speaker and the skill of a specific transcriber, leading to large variations in spelling. Some examples are (diacritics removed):

Ojajii	LB	Eluyemi (x86)
Ogun	Ogun	Ogun
Odidimode Rogbeesin	Odidimode Rogbesin	
Gboonijio	Gbodo-Nijio	Gbodo-Nijio
Okanlajosin	Okunlajosin	-
Adegbalu	Adegbolu	Adegbolu
Luwoo	Luwo (Female)	Luwo (Female)
Ojelokunbirin	Oje Lokunsinrin	Ojee Lokunsinrin
Larunnka	Larinka	Larinka
Adegunle Adewela	Adegunle Abeweela	Abewela
Degbinsokun	Degbin Kumbusu	Degbinna-okun
Orarigba	Orayigba Ojaja	Orayigbi

Also note that, in the aggregated table, differences that clearly come only from pronunciation have been ignored.

=== Consolidation at the price of the obvious discrepancies ===
==== Typographic issues ====
Printing fixes everything, even the typographic issues.

1. The two printed quotations of the printed Ojo Bada have discrepancies: Otaataa=Otasasa, Arirereokewe=Arirekewe, Lajamusan=Lajamisan.
2. When Awosemo 1985 (quoted by Sina Ojuade) says Giesi before Ogboruu, this is probably a typo. Indeed, all other sources are saying that Ogboruu #23 was the maternal grand father of Giesi #24.
3. The quotation of Ademakinwa (p158) uses Kworokolokun: this is probably Aworokolokun.
4. In column x86, Lagunja is repeated. How to correct ?
5. Perhaps Ologundu 2008 ranging Osinkola #18 at place #25 is also a typo ?

==== Remaining discrepancies ====
1. In list A, Lajamisan is ranked #11. This can be tracked to the 1973 Daily Sketch kinglist (p158). This is strange since a list from start to Lajamisan should end by Lajamisan. Moving this one just before Otujabiojo #17 would synchronize the ordering of all the kinglists from Oduduwa to Lajamisan. This should be checked in detail.
2. While list A sources put both Aworokolokin and Ajuimuda Ekun before Lajamisan, most of the list B sources are saying that Aworokolokin, Ajuimuda and Ekun were three descendants of Lajodoogun. We can only underline the discrepancy. Moreover, Ologundu don't quote Aworokolokin at all in his lists. (green in the table).
3. The same occurs with the only woman that became Ooni. Most of the time, she is quoted as "Luwoo Gbagida" #18 and placed before Lajodogun #19. But also as "Luwo (Female)" and placed after Giesi #24. (green in the table).
4. Efon Ayioye #6 in Awoyinfa is quite surely the same person as "Ayioye" in Bada and Fasogbon. But they are not ranked the same by the sources relatively to Ajimuda Ekun #7. Perhaps this was the reason of the comment no matter how ripe the okra is, it cannot be older than itself.
5. 9 names aren't part of list A or list B.

"At least, it can be said that the existence of numerous variants requires explanation, and an interpretation can be assessed according to how satisfactorily it accounts for their existence. The method might be described as one of reductio ad non absurdum."
