= 2023 Nigerian Senate elections in Osun State =

2023 Senate elections in Osun

← 2019	25 February 2023	2027 →

All 3 Osun State seats in the Senate of Nigeria
	Majority party	Minority party
Party	APC	PDP
Last election	2	1
Seats before	2	1
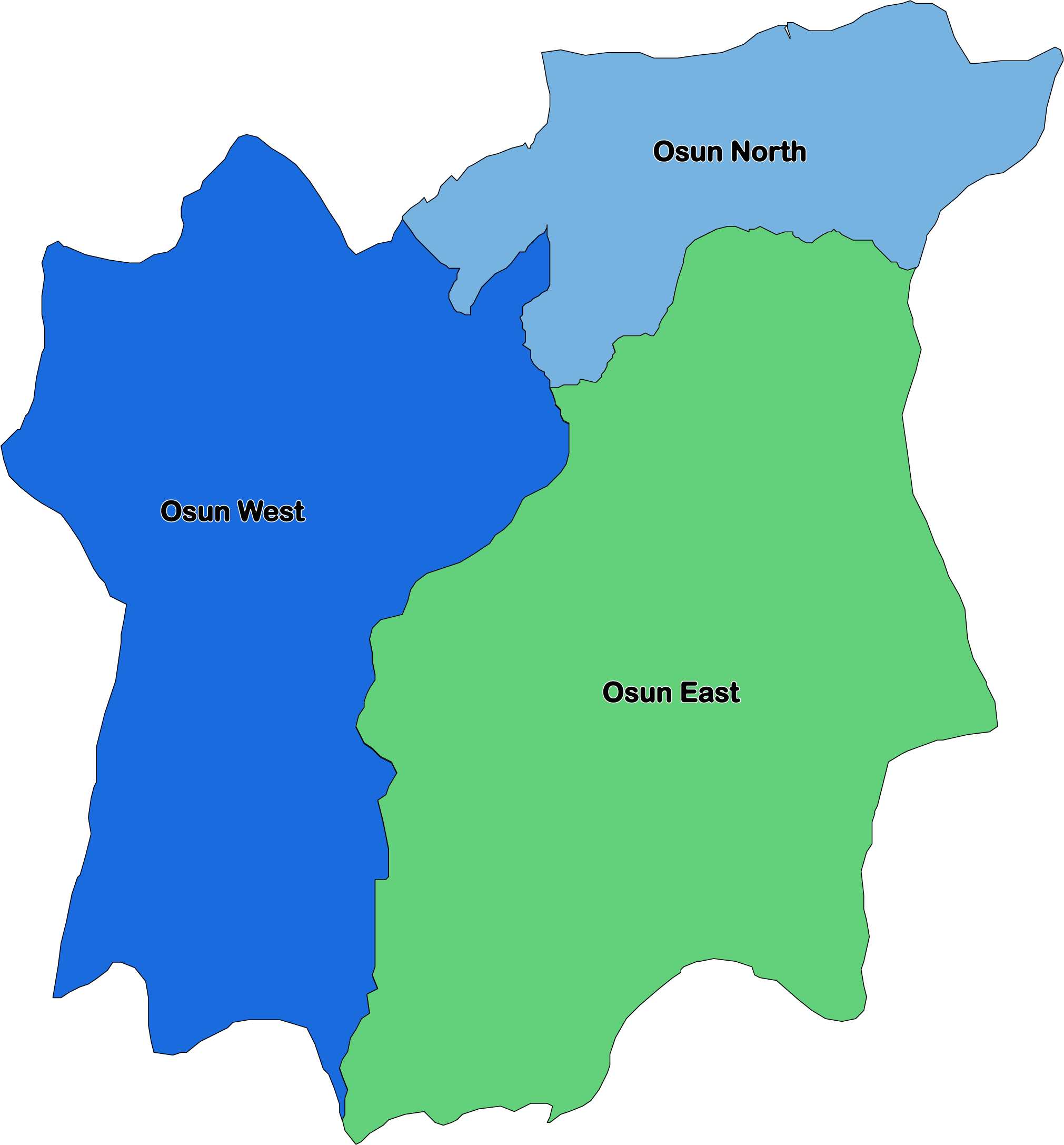
- APC incumbent lost renomination APC incumbent running for re-election PDP incumbent running for re-election

The 2023 Nigerian Senate elections in Osun State will be held on 25 February 2023, to elect the 3 federal Senators from Osun State, one from each of the state's three senatorial districts. The elections will coincide with the 2023 presidential election, as well as other elections to the Senate and elections to the House of Representatives; with state elections being held two weeks later. Primaries were held between 4 April and 9 June 2022.

== Background ==
In the previous Senate elections, none of the three incumbent senators were returned with Olusola Adeyeye (APC-Central) and Babajide Omoworare (APC=East) losing renomination while Ademola Adeleke (PDP-West) retired. In the East district election, Francis Adenigba Fadahunsi gained the seat for the PDP with 50% of the vote while Ajibola Basiru (APC) retained the East district for his party with 54%. In the West district, Adelere Adeyemi Oriolowo (APC) gained the seat with 41% of the vote. The senatorial results were a continuation of slight APC control in the state as the party also won most House of Representatives seats and won a majority in the House of Assembly, in addition to Buhari winning the state in the presidential election.

== Overview ==
Affiliation	Party		Total
Affiliation	APC	PDP	Total
Previous Election	2	1	3
Before Election	2	1	3
After Election	0	3	3

== Summary ==
District	Incumbent		Results	
District	Incumbent	Party	Status	Candidates
Osun Central	Ajibola Basiru	APC	Incumbent lost re-election New member elected PDP gain	▌Ajibola Basiru (APC); ▌ ✓ Olubiyi Fadeyi (PDP)
Osun East	Francis Adenigba Fadahunsi	PDP	Incumbent re-elected	▌Ajibola Famurewa (APC); ▌ ✓ Francis Adenigba Fadahunsi (PDP)
Osun West	Adelere Adeyemi Oriolowo	APC	Incumbent lost renomination New member elected PDP gain	▌Raheem Amidu Tadese (APC); ▌ ✓ Lere Oyewumi (PDP)

== Osun Central ==
2023 Osun Central Senatorial District election
← 2019	25 February 2023	2027 →
Nominee	Ajibola Basiru	Olubiyi Fadeyi
Party	APC	PDP
Senator before election
Ajibola Basiru
APC
Elected Senator
TBD

The Osun Central Senatorial District covers the local government areas of Boluwaduro, Boripe, Ifedayo, Ifelodun, Ila, Irepodun, Odo Otin, Olorunda, Orolu, and Osogbo. Incumbent Ajibola Basiru (APC), who was elected with 54.3% of the vote in 2019, is seeking re-election.

=== General election ===
==== Results ====
2023 Osun Central Senatorial District election
Party	Candidate	Votes	%
A	Saheed Olanrewaju Ajibade		
ADC	Olusesan Mutiu Yusuf		
APC	Ajibola Basiru		
APM	Adewale Simon Adebayo		
BP	Adesoji Masilo Adeleke		
LP	Jimoh Oyebode Babalola		
New Nigeria Peoples Party	Clement Kola Bamigbola		
PRP	Rasheed Ayofe Ajibade		
PDP	Olubiyi Fadeyi		
Total votes			100.00%
Invalid or blank votes			N/A
Turnout			

== Osun East ==
2023 Osun East Senatorial District election
← 2019	25 February 2023	2027 →
Nominee	Ajibola Famurewa	Francis Adenigba Fadahunsi
Party	APC	PDP
Senator before election
Francis Adenigba Fadahunsi
PDP
Elected Senator
TBD

The Osun East Senatorial District covers the local government areas of Atakunmosa East, Atakunmosa West, Ife Central, Ife East, Ife North, Ife South, Ilesa East, Ilesa West, Obokun, and Oriade. Incumbent Francis Adenigba Fadahunsi (APC), who was elected with 50.5% of the vote in 2019, is seeking re-election.

=== General election ===
==== Results ====
2023 Osun East Senatorial District election
Party	Candidate	Votes	%
A	Joseph Oladipo Oladapo		
APP	Oluseye Titus Odesola		
ADC	Ebenezer Adeyemi		
APC	Ajibola Famurewa		
APM	Abolawa Abioye		
BP	Oyekola Peter Alade		
LP	Olaniran Anthony Igbaroola		
New Nigeria Peoples Party	Banjo Ojedeji		
PDP	Francis Adenigba Fadahunsi		
ZLP	Michael Oladimeji Fowowe		
Total votes			100.00%
Invalid or blank votes			N/A
Turnout			

== Osun West ==
2023 Osun West Senatorial District election
← 2019	25 February 2023	2027 →
Nominee	Raheem Amidu Tadese	Lere Oyewumi
Party	APC	PDP
Senator before election
Adelere Adeyemi Oriolowo
APC
Elected Senator
TBD

The Osun West Senatorial District covers the local government areas of Aiyedaade, Aiyedire, Ede North, Ede South, Egbedore, Ejigbo, Irewole, Isokan, Iwo, and Ola Oluwa. Incumbent Adelere Adeyemi Oriolowo (APC), who was elected with 41.4% of the vote in 2019, is seeking re-election.

=== General election ===
==== Results ====
2023 Osun West Senatorial District election
Party	Candidate	Votes	%
A	Adetunji Anthony Adeleke		
APP	Elizabeth Oyewumi Adekunle		
ADC	Bamidele Odeyemi		
APC	Raheem Amidu Tadese		
APM	Ibrahim Olanrewaju Olasupo		
BP	Emmanuel Gbenga Afeni		
LP	Samuel Akingbade Oyelekan		
NRM	Wasiu Adetunji Oladosu		
New Nigeria Peoples Party	Bolaji Mayowa Akinyode		
PRP	Solomon Adewale Alabi		
PDP	Lere Oyewumi		
Total votes			100.00%
Invalid or blank votes			N/A
Turnout			

== See also ==
- 2023 Nigerian Senate election
- 2023 Nigerian elections
- 2023 Osun State elections
