= Nigerian National Assembly delegation from Osun =

Osun's delegation in Nigeria's National Assembly

The Nigerian National Assembly delegation from Osun State comprises three Senators and nine Representatives.

== 10th Assembly (2023—2027) ==
The People's Democratic Party won all three senatorial seats and the nine house of representatives seats in Osun State. They are as follows:

Senator	Party	Constituency
Fadeyi Oluwole Olubiyi	PDP	Osun Central
Fadahunsi Francis Adenigba	PDP	Osun East
Oyewumi Kamorudeen Olalere	PDP	Osun West

Representative	Party	Constituency
Adewale Morufu Adebayo	PDP	Irepodun/Olorunda/Osogbo/Orolu
Ajilesoro Abimbola Taofeek	PDP	Ife Central/East/North/South
Bamidele Salam	PDP	Ede North/South/Egbedore/Ejigbo
Mudashiru Lukman Alani	PDP	Ayedire/Iwo/Ola-Oluwa
Adetunji Abidemi Olusoji	PDP	Odo-Otin/Ifelodun/Boripe
Akanni Clement Ademola	PDP	Boluwaduro/Ifedayo/Ila
Omorin Emmanuel Olusanya	PDP	Atakunmosa East/West/Ilesa East/West
Oluwole Oke Busayo	PDP	Obokun/Oriade
Oladebo Lanre Olomololaye	PDP	Ayedaade/Irewole/Isokan

== 9th Assembly (2019–2023) ==
Senator	Party	Constituency
Surajudeen Ajibola Basiru	APC	Osun Central
Fadahunsi Francis Adenigba	PDP	Osun East
Adelere Adeyemi Oriolowo	APC	Osun West

Representative	Party	Constituency
Oyewo Olubukola Oyegbile	APC	Irepodun/Olorunda/Osogbo/Orolu
Ajilesoro Abimbola Taofeek	PDP	Ife Central/East/North/South
Bamidele Salam	PDP	Ede North, South/Egbedero/Ejigbo
Amobi Yinusa Akintola	APC	Ayedire/Iwo/Ola-Oluwa
Afolabi Rasheed Olalekan	APC	Odo-Otin/Ifelodun/Boripe
Olufemi Fakeye	APC	Boluwaduro/Ifedayo/Illa
Lawrence Babatunde Ayeni	APC	ATAKUNMOSA EAST/ATAKUNMOSA WEST/IJESA
Oluwole Oke	PDP	Obokun/Oriade
Taiwo Olukemi Oluga	APC	Ayedaade/Irewole/Isokan

== 8th Assembly (2015–2019) ==
Senator	Party	Constituency
Olusola Adeyeye	APC	Osun Central
Babajide Omoworare	APC	Osun East
Ademola Adeleke	PDP	Osun West
Representative	Party	Constituency
Yusuf Sulaimon Lasun	PDP	Irepodun/Olurunda/Osogbo/Orolu
Albert Adeogun	PDP	Ife Central/East/North/South
Mojeed Alabi	APC	Ede North, South/Egbedero/Ejigbo
Ajayi Adeyinka	APC	Ife Federal Constituency
Gafaru Akintayo	APC	Ayedire/Iwo/Ola-Oluwa
Ajayi Ayantunji	APC	Odo-Otin/Ifelodun/Boripe
Julius Fakeye	APC	Boluwaduro/Ifedayo/Illa
Ajibola Famurewa	APC	ATAKUNMOSA EAST/ATAKUNMOSA WEST/IJESA
Oluwole Oke	PDP	Obokun/Oriade
Ayo Omidiran	APC	Ayedaade/Irewole/Isokan

== 6th Assembly (2007–2011) ==
The 6th National Assembly (2007–2011) was inaugurated on 5 June 2007. The People's Democratic Party (PDP) won all three Senate and ten House seats

Senators representing Osun State in the 6th Assembly were:

Senator	Constituency	Party
Isiaka Adetunji Adeleke	West	PDP
Iyiola Omisore	East	PDP
Simeon Oduoye	Central	PDP

Representatives in the 6th Assembly were:

Representative	Constituency	Party
Adeyemi Adejare	Irepodun/Olurunda/Osogbo/Orolu	PDP
Albert Adeogun	Ife Central/East/North/South	PDP
Falade Ajibade Michael	Ede North, South/Egbedero/Ejigbo	PDP
Fasogbon John Olawole	Ife Federal Constituency	PDP
Jolaoya George	Ayedire/Iwo/Ola-Oluwa	PDP
Kayode Idowu	Odo-Otin/Ifelodun/Boripe	PDP
Kolawole Ismaila	Boluwaduro/Ifedayo/Illa	PDP
Olugbenga Onigbogi	ATAKUNMOSA EAST/ATAKUNMOSA WEST/IJESA	PDP
Oluwole Oke	Obokun/Oriade	PDP
Patricia Etteh	Ayedaade/Irewole/Isokan	PDP

== See also ==
- Senate of Nigeria
- Nigerian National Assembly
