= 2019 Nigerian House of Representatives elections in Osun State =

The 2019 Nigerian House of Representatives elections in Osun State was held on February 23, 2019, to elect members of the House of Representatives to represent Osun State, Nigeria.

== Overview ==
Affiliation	Party		Total
Affiliation	APC	PDP	Total
Before Election	7	2	9
After Election	6	3	9

== Summary ==
District	Incumbent	Party	Elected Rep	Party
Ayedaade/Irewole/Isokan	Ayo Omidiran	APC	Taiwo Oluga	APC
Ayedire/Iwo/Ola-Oluwa	Gafaru Akintayo	APC	Yinusa Amobi	APC
Boluwaduro/Ifedayo/Illa	Olufemi Fakeye	APC	Olufemi Fakeye	APC
Ede North/Ede South/Egbedero/Ejigbo	Mojeed Alabi	APC	Bamidele Salam	PDP
Ife Central/Ife East/Ife North/Ife South	Albert Adeogun	PDP	Taofeek Ajilesoro	PDP
Atakunmosa East/Atakunmosa West/Ilesa East/Ilesa West	Ajibola Famurewa	APC	Lawrence Ayeni	APC
Irepodun/Olurunda/Osogbo/Orolu	Yusuf Lasun	APC	Olubukola Oyewo	APC
Obokon/Oriade	Oluwole Oke	PDP	Oluwole Oke	PDP
Odo-Otin/Boripe/Ifelodun	Ajayi Adeyinka Ayantunji	APC	Olalekan Afolabi	APC

== Results ==
=== Ayedaade/Irewole/Isokan ===
A total of 12 candidates registered with the Uzo Independent National Electoral Commission to contest in the election. APC candidate Taiwo Oluga won the election, defeating PDP Bukola Adebisi and 10 other party candidates. Oluga received 48.78% of the votes, while Adebisi received 42.27%.

2019 Nigerian House of Representatives election in Osun State
Party	Candidate	Votes	%
APC	Taiwo Oluga	36,876	48.78%
PDP	Bukola Adebisi	31,956	42.27%
Others		6,760	8.94%
Total votes		75,592	100%
APC hold			

=== Ayedire/Iwo/Ola-Oluwa ===
A total of 13 candidates registered with the Independent National Electoral Commission to contest in the election. APC candidate Yinusa Amobi won the election, defeating PDP Lukman Mudashiru and 11 other candidates. Amobi received 42.82% of the votes, while Mudashiru received 31.66%.

2019 Nigerian House of Representatives election in Osun State
Party	Candidate	Votes	%
APC	Yinusa Amobi	29,229	42.82%
PDP	Lukman Mudashiru	21,608	31.66%
Others		17,416	25.52%
Total votes		68,253	100%
APC hold			

=== Boluwaduro/Ifedayo/Illa ===
A total of 12 candidates registered with the Independent National Electoral Commission to contest in the election. APC candidate Olufemi Fakeye won the election, defeating PDP Clement Akanni and 10 other party candidates. Fakeye received 51.88% of the votes, while Akanni received 43.92%.

2019 Nigerian House of Representatives election in Osun State
Party	Candidate	Votes	%
APC	Olufemi Fakeye	20,371	51.88%
PDP	Clement Akanni	17,247	43.92%
Others		1,648	4.20%
Total votes		39,266	100%
APC hold			

=== Ede North/Ede South/Egbedero/Ejigbo ===
A total of 14 candidates registered with the Independent National Electoral Commission to contest in the election. PDD candidate Bamidele Salam won the election, defeating APC Adejare Bello and 12 other candidates. Salam received 46.46% of the votes, while Bello received 44.36%.

2019 Nigerian House of Representatives election in Osun State
Party	Candidate	Votes	%
PDP	Bamidele Salam	46,994	46.46%
APC	Adejare Bello	44,866	44.36%
Others		9,280	9.18%
Total votes		101,140	100%
PDP hold			

=== Ife Central/Ife East/Ife North/Ife South ===
A total of 10 candidates registered with the Independent National Electoral Commission to contest in the election. PDP candidate Taofeek Ajilesoro won the election, defeating APC Folorunso Oladoyin and 8 other candidates. Ajilesoro received 50.43% of the votes, while Oladoyin received 44.28%.

2019 Nigerian House of Representatives election in Osun State
Party	Candidate	Votes	%
PDP	Taofeek Ajilesoro	52,801	50.43%
APC	Folorunso Oladoyin	46,373	44.28%
Others		5,535	5.29%
Total votes		104,709	100%
APM hold			

=== Atakunmosa East/Atakunmosa West/Ilesa East/Ilesa West ===
A total of 2 candidates registered with the Independent National Electoral Commission to contest in the election. APC candidate Lawrence Ayeni won the election, defeating PDP Dapo Adelowokan. Ayeni received 57.65% of the votes, while Adelowokan received 42.35%.

2019 Nigerian House of Representatives election in Osun State
Party	Candidate	Votes	%
APC	Lawrence Ayeni	41,867	57.65%
PDP	Dapo Adelowokan	30,760	42.35%
Others			
Total votes		72,627	100%
APC hold			

=== Irepodun/Olurunda/Osogbo/Orolu ===
A total of 20 candidates registered with the Independent National Electoral Commission to contest in the election. APC candidate Olubukola Oyewo won the election, defeating PDP Morufu Adebayo and 18 other party candidate. Oyewo received 52.45% of the votes, while Adebayo received 46.67%.

2019 Nigerian House of Representatives election in Osun State
Party	Candidate	Votes	%
APC	Olubukola Oyewo	66,933	52.45%
PDP	Morufu Adebayo	59,551	46.67%
Others		1,120	0.88%
Total votes		127,604	100%
APC hold			

=== Obokon/Oriade ===
A total of 13 candidates registered with the Independent National Electoral Commission to contest in the election. PDP candidate Oluwole Oke won the election, defeating APC Olasiji Akanmu and 11 other candidates. Oke received 53.51% of the votes, while Akanmu received 41.67%.

2019 Nigerian House of Representatives election in Osun State
Party	Candidate	Votes	%
PDP	Oluwole Oke	25,329	53.51%
APC	Olasiji Akanmu	19,725	41.67%
Others		2,281	4.82%
Total votes		47,335	100%
PDP hold			

=== Odo-Otin/Boripe/Ifelodun ===
A total of 11 candidates registered with the Independent National Electoral Commission to contest in the election. APC candidate Olalekan Afolabi won the election, defeating PDP Adetunji Olusoji and 9 other candidates. Afolabi received 55.20% of the votes, while Olusoji received 43.47%.

2019 Nigerian House of Representatives election in Osun State
Party	Candidate	Votes	%
APC	Olalekan Afolabi	41,117	55.20%
PDP	Adetunji Olusoji	32,389	43.48%
Others		988	1.33%
Total votes		74,494	100%
APC hold			
