= 2026 Osun State gubernatorial election =

2026 gubernatorial election in Osun State, Nigeria

- 15 August 2026
Nominee	Ademola Adeleke	Bola Oyebamiji	Najeem Salaam
Party	A	APC	ADC
Popular vote	511,067	444,815	17,180
Governor before election
Ademola Adeleke
A
Elected Governor
Ademola Adeleke
A

The 2026 Osun State gubernatorial election took place on 15 August 2026, to elect the governor of Osun State. Incumbent Accord governor, Ademola Adeleke is eligible for reelection. The primaries to elect candidates was held between 24 November and 15 December 2025. Ademola Adeleke was declared winner on 16 August 2026 by INEC.

== Electoral system ==
The Governor of Osun State is elected using the first-past-the-post voting system.

== Primary elections ==
The primaries, along with any potential challenges to primary results, are scheduled for between February 16 and March 12.

=== Accord ===
==== Declared ====
- Ademola Adeleke, incumbent Governor

=== PDP ===
==== No Candidate ====
According to the list of candidates released by the Independent National Electoral Commission, the PDP did not present a candidate for the Osun state August 8, 2026 election.

=== APC ===
==== Declared ====
- Munirudeen Bola Oyebamiji (“AMBO”), Managing Director and chief executive officer of the National Inland Waterways Authority (NIWA).

=== ADC ===
==== Potential ====
- Najeem Salam, former speaker of Osun state House of Assembly

== General election ==
There were 2,339,544 registered voters, with a voter turnout of 988,151, representing 42.1% of registered voters. Fourteen candidates contested the election.

Adeleke was declared the winner of the election, defeating his closest challenger, Bola Oyebamiji, by 511,067 to 444,815 votes. The results were collated from the state’s 30 local government areas, giving Adeleke a margin of 66,252 votes. He won in several local government areas, including Oriade, Ede North, Ede South, Osogbo, Ife East, Odo Otin, Ila, and Egbedore, while his competitors won in local government areas such as Isokan, Obokun, Irewole, Ife South, Ilesa East, Boripe, Olorunda, and Atakunmosa East.

=== Results ===
Full Results - All Candidates
#	Candidate	Party	Votes	%
1	Ademola Adeleke	Accord	511,067	51.8%
2	Bola Oyebamiji	All progressive Congress	444,815	45.0%
3	Salaam Najeem Folasayo	African Democratic Congress	17,180	1.7%
4	Olanrewaju Farinloye	Action Alliance	4,030	0.4%
5	Adeagbo Yemisi	Action Democratic Party	2,919	0.3%
6	Adesina Adeyemi-Doro	All Progressives Grand Alliance	2,566	0.3%
7	Abdulsalam Olamide	Zenith Labour Party	2,398	0.2%
8	Esan Olajide	African Action Congress	1,419	0.1%
9	Olalekan Ogunsakin	Young Progressives Party	513	0.1%
10	Joseph Anifowose	Allied Peoples Movement	228	0.0%
11	Adeyera Oluwabusola Adesola	New Nigeria People's Party	113	0.0%
12	Clement Adesuyi	Action Peoples Party	110	0.0%
13	Masilo Adeleke	Boot Party	106	0.0%
14	Saliu Oyelami	Peoples Redemption Party	84	0.0%

== Controversies ==
The Economic and Financial Crimes Commission (EFCC) froze the Osun State Government’s bank account over an alleged ₦11 billion diversion, describing the transactions as an “unwarranted movement of funds” on August 2, 2026. Following the development, the Nigerian Bar Association criticized the EFCC’s action, saying that no government agency had the right to freeze the account as it could disrupt government activities. Then, President Bola Ahmed Tinubu subsequently ordered the EFCC to unfreeze the account.

Afrobeats singer Davido warned that he would seek intervention from Trump if anything went wrong during the election. On August 12, he wrote an open letter to Trump and other global leaders. On September 9, the PDP denied authorising a petition challenging the election results.

During the election, Adeleke alleged that APC had prepared fake results to replace the official ones and urged that all result be collated at their respective local government areas. The chairman of INEC, Joash Ojo Amupitan, also said that the commission experienced challenges ahead of the 2027 elections and would need to do better in combating misinformation and disinformation in order to gain voter's trust and address apathy ahead of the 2027 elections.

== See also ==
- 2026 Nigerian gubernatorial elections
- 2026 Ekiti State gubernatorial election
- 2027 Nigerian general election
