= Ajilesoro =

Lineage of traditional rulers of Ife-Ife, Nigeria

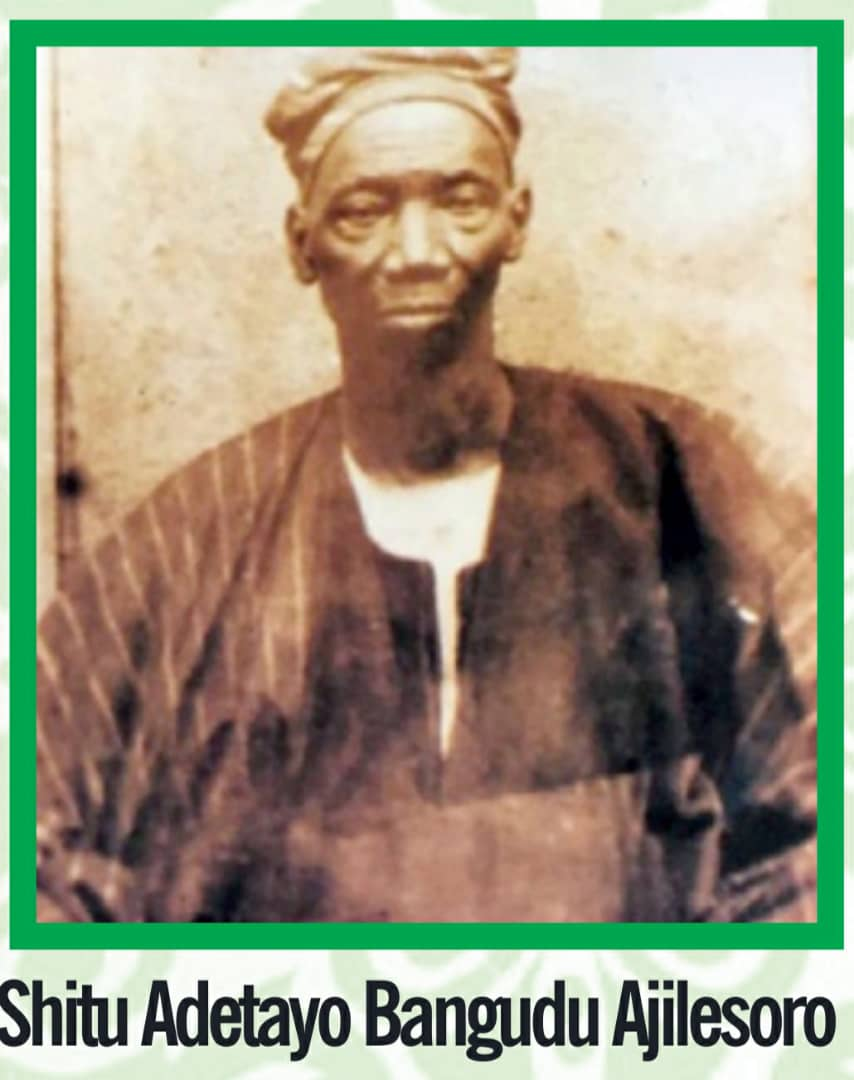
Patriarch of Ajilesoro Dynasty

The Ajilesoro (Edun-lde Compound) Royal Dynasty in llara Ile-lfe emerged from Obalufon Ogbogbodirin who succeeded his forebears Osangangan Obamakin (Oranfe) and Ogun; who reigned as the second and third Ooni of Ife over 1,000 years ago after the reign of Oduduwa. The Ooni of Ife is the supreme traditional ruler amongst the Yoruba people.

== Historical foundation ==
History had it that the 2nd Ooni of Ife Osangangan Obamakin (Oranfe) and Ogun were related and were among the primordial supernatural beings that lived in the ancient Ile-Ife Kingdom. Others are Obawinrin, Obatala and Oduduwa.

Ooni Obalufon Ogbogbodirin was the fourth king in Ile-lfe who lived and reigned for many centuries and transfigured into a metal statue and a figurine which today has become a deity.

Obalufon Shrine and groove today plays a significant role in the installation of every Ooni of Ife that reigned after him, as the sacred Aare Crown is always blessed in the shrine before a new king could wear it.

Obalufon Alayemore succeeded his father Obalufon Ogbogbodirin as the fifth Ooni of Ife. He also lived long on the throne and later founded and established Other settlements like Ido-Osun, Ifon Osun, Erin Osun, Ayedun (Kwara State), Odo Ere, Ife Olukotun, Ogbe, Odo Ara (Kogi State),Erin Ile, Erinmo, Ilawe Ekiti, Ilasa Ekiti, Asa, Igbara Odo, Ilara Mokin, Osan Ekiti, Ora Igbomina, Iba, Ogudu, Sagamu, Ikorodu, Ikeja, Oke Imesi and Ẹfọ̀n-Alààyè.

Ooni Obalufon Alayemore had many children, grandchildren and great grandchildren whose descendants settled in Iremo quarters till today. Among which were: Edun-lde, Alasa, Iljaura, Aka, Akinrin and their farm settlements — Ijabata Edun-lde, Ijabata Olebe, Ijaata Goriolo, Ijabata Obariyun, Ijabata Alasa, Ijabata Obawinrin, Ijabata Aieja.

The patriarch of Edun-lde later migrated and followed the footprints of his forebear Obalufon to settle in the present day Obalufon Ilara Ile-lfe. Some of the Edun Ide lineage of Obalufon are Awofade, Adetipe Loguro (Oso-Oru Koyoniyan), Ajilesoro Ounbiyo (Ajaba Jakulu) and Bowofade Monranro.

After their forebear Ooni Obalufon Alayemore left the throne to establish other settlements and Obalufon lineage was put on hold to ascend the Ooni's Stool; the royal Edun-lde family decided to install the oldest member of the family as Baale to head the clan.

Ajilesoro, among the numerous descendants of Ooni Obalufon Alayemore, was a carrier of the lively and social traits of their forebears. He was famous for the business of bead making and merchandising and became very successful. Apart from Obalufon Deity, Odun Esa (also called Odun Aje/Aje Festival) is the tradition of Edun-lde Royal Dynasty. This age long Aje Festival is still being celebrated with fanfair and excitement.

== List of Baale from Ajilesoro Edun-lde compound ==
1. Baale Awofade
2. Baale Adetipe Loguro (Oso-Oru Koyoni/Oso-Oru Koyoniyan)
3. Baale Adewoyin Aberejo —Died in 1953
4. Baale Sakiru Omisakin Ajilesoro (Baba Pupa) — 1956
5. Baale Shitu Adetayo Bangudu Ajilesoro (Baba Kogbagbere) – 1962
6. Baale Adeyera Ali 1962-1968
7. Baale Adewale Lawal 1968-1982
8. Baale Abdul Adereti Gbadamosi Ajilesoro 1982-2004
9. Baale Adefolaju Salawudeen Gbadamosi Ajilesoro 2004-2011
10. Baale Ashiru Seidu Ajilesoro 2011-2017
11. Baale Ademola Temidire Bowofade 2017 till date.

== See also ==
- Taofeek Abimbola Ajilesoro
- Oladele Olasoji Vincent (Ajilesoro)
