= Kayode Oladele =

Nigerian politician (born 1963)

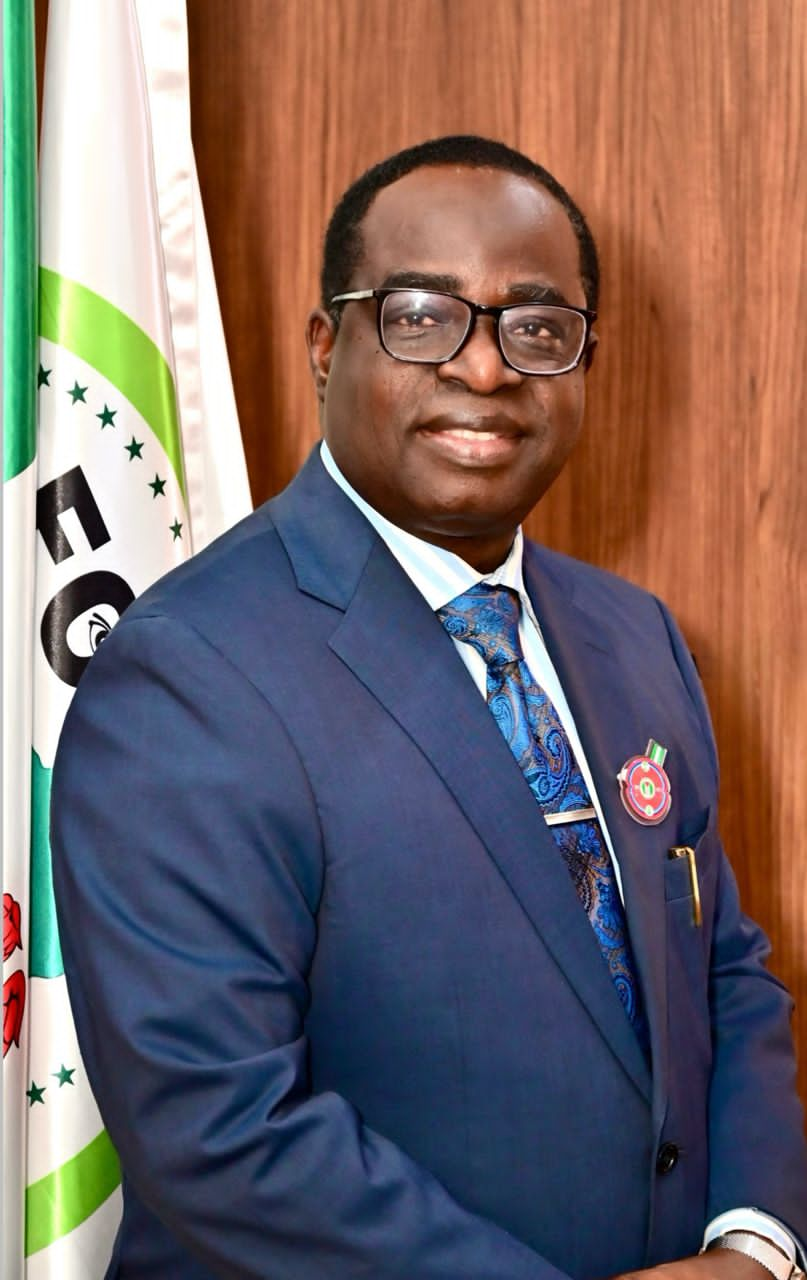
- Oladele at the Federal Character Commission (FCC) in 2025.

Member of the Nigerian House of Representatives
- In office 8 June 2015 – June 2019
- Preceded by: Rasak Adewusi
- Succeeded by: Jimoh Olaifa
- Constituency: Yewa North/Imeko-Afon Federal Constituency

Commissioner and Member of the Federal Character Commission
- In office 3 February 2025 – 2 July 2025

Acting Chairman of the Federal Character Commission
- In office 2 July 2025 – 21 January 2026
- Preceded by: Muheeba Dankaka
- Succeeded by: Ayo Omidiran

Personal details
- Born: 8 June 1963 (age 63) Nigeria
- Party: All Progressives Congress
- Occupation: Lawyer, Politician

Kayode Oladele (born 8 June 1963) is a Nigerian human rights activist, lawyer and politician who served as the acting chairman of the Federal Character Commission (FCC) from 2 July 2025 to 21 January 2026. He currently serves as a Federal Commissioner and member of the Federal Character Commission (FCC) of Nigeria representing Ogun State having been appointed by President Bola Ahmed Tinubu and sworn in on February 3, 2025, after the Senate confirmation. He served as a member of the Nigerian House of Representatives representing Yewa North/Imeko-Afon Federal Constituency, Ogun State, from 2015 to 2019 where he also served as the Chairman of the House of Representatives' Committee on Financial Crimes. He was elected under the platform of the All Progressives Congress on 11 April 2015. Prior to that, he served as Chief of Staff to the Executive Chairman of the Economic and Financial Crimes Commission (EFCC), a law enforcement agency that investigates financial crimes in Nigeria.

Oladele served as legal adviser to the governor of Ogun State and member of the State Executive Council from 2008 to 2011. On 20 February 2021, he was appointed by the Governor of Ogun State, Nigeria, Dapo Abiodun as the Chairman of a 20-member Peace-Building Committee. The committee was inaugurated by the state government to determine the root cause of the incessant deadly clashes between the farmers and herders in Ogun West Senatorial District of the State, proffer lasting solutions and ensure that peace and harmony continue to reign in the area and the State.

== Early life and education ==
Oladele was born on 8 June 1963 in Nigeria. He is a mixed descent of Yewa and Awori subgroups of the Yoruba people found in the western axis of Ogun State and Lagos State. He is also a descendant of Oniji dynasty of Aafin ruling house, one of the two ruling houses in line of succession to the throne of the ancient kingdom of Onimeko of Imeko in Imeko, Ogun State, Nigeria. His great-grandfather held the hereditary noble title of Ara Baba Oba of Imeko and member of the traditional kingmakers council who select the king or Oba of Imeko, the Onimeko of Imeko. Maternally, he is a member of Ologundudu Oyekan Royal family of Adapaako Ruling House of Iwoye-Ketu, the ancient Yoruba community that produced the first Are Ona Kakanfo of Yorubaland and Oniyunkun Ruling House of Moriwi both in Imeko-Afon Local Government Area of Ogun State.

Oladele attended Baptist High School, Ilaro, Ogun State, where he obtained the West African School Certificate in 1981. He proceeded to Oyo State College of Arts and Science, Ile-Ife and obtained a Higher School Certificate/General Certificate of Education ( Advanced Level) in 1984. He then attended the University of Lagos, Nigeria, from where he received his Bachelor of Laws (LL.B Hon.) Degree in 1987. He proceeded to the Nigerian Law School, Victoria Island, Lagos and was called to the Bar as a barrister and solicitor of the Supreme Court of Nigeria in 1988. He later earned a Master of Laws (LL.M) degree from Wayne State University Law School, Detroit, Michigan, USA in 2000. He was admitted to the State Bar of Michigan as an attorney and counselor the same year and rolls of the Supreme Court of the United States Bar in December 2004. He is an Executive Education alumnus of Harvard Kennedy School of Government, Cambridge, Massachusetts, USA.

== Legal and political career ==
Oladele worked for several years as an associate partner in the law offices of the Detroit, Michigan based, Benjamin Whitfield Jr. & Associates PC.

Oladele represented the plaintiffs in an international human rights violation case brought by a group of Nigerians including the mover of Nigeria's independence motion in 1956, Anthony Enahoro and Hafsat Abiola-Costello, daughter of the presumed winner of Nigeria's 1993 Presidential election, M.K.O. Abiola against a former military ruler in Nigeria, Gen. Abdusalami Abubakar before a United States' Federal Court in Chicago, Illinois. The protracted human rights abuse and extrajudicial killing litigation which went up to the US Supreme Court (on appeal) was eventually settled in 2008 by the Federal Government of Nigeria under the administration of late President Umaru Musa Yar'Adua.

In 2009, he was appointed by the then President of Nigeria, Umaru Musa Yar'Adua to liaise with the relevant United States authorities with regard to the Halliburton bribery investigation. In 2010, he was appointed by the Government of Nigeria to hold watching brief in the criminal trial of Umar Farouk Abdulmutallab, popularly referred to as the "Underwear Bomber", who was convicted of attempting to detonate plastic explosives hidden in his underwear while on board Northwest Airlines Flight 253 from Amsterdam to Detroit on Christmas Day, 2009.

In April 2022, Oladele declared interest to seek re-election to the House of Representatives on the platform of All Progressives Congress (APC), to represent Yewa North/Imeko Afon Federal Constituency of Ogun State in the National Assembly. However, he stepped down on the eve of the primary election following a consensus arrangement initiated by Ogun State Governor, Dapo Abiodun and the leadership of All Progressives Congress ( APC) in the State.

He later served as a member of the Pre-Convention Management and Rappurteur Committee at the Special Convention for the Presidential Primary of the All Progressives Congress (APC) in June 2022.

In October 2022, he was appointed as the Southwest Secretary, Directorate of Grassroots Engagement and Orientation of Tinubu/Shetima APC Presidential Campaign Council (PCC) where he also doubles as Ogun State Coordinator of the Directorate. On December 4, 2022, the Governor of Ogun state, Dapo Abiodun also appointed him into his Governorship Campaign Council as Adviser to the public communication Committee.

On September 12, 2026, he was appointed Chairman of the Campaign Planning Committee for the 2027 All Progressive Congress (APC) Ogun State Presidential and Gubernatorial Campaign Council.

== Pro-democracy and human rights activism ==
Oladele was involved in the Nigerian pro-democracy movement and agitation for a civil rule that eventually led to the collapse of the military dictatorship in Nigeria in 1999. He was a pioneer member of the Committee for the Defence of Human Rights (CDHR), one of the earliest human rights organizations in Nigeria which was formed in 1989 to defend the rights of the people detained by the then federal military government. He was also a member of the National Consultative Forum (NCF), the first group in Nigeria to fight for the convocation of Sovereign National Conference (SNC) and whose progressive elements later formed the Campaign for Democracy (CD) in 1991. In 1992, he teamed up with Frederick Fasehun, Baba Omojola, and several other labour leaders and student activists to form the Movement for Social and Economic Justice (MOSEJ) and later became its executive director. Thereafter, he and few other Pan-Yoruba pro-democracy activists led by Fasehun conceived and formed the Oodua People's Congress (OPC), a Yoruba Nationalist Movement. In 1993 at the peak of the nationwide protests Organized by the Campaign for Democracy against the nullification of the June 12, 1993 Presidential election won by MKO Abiola, when the national secretariat of the CD was put under siege by Gen. Ibrahim Babangida, Oladele's residence was converted to be used as the interim converging point for the expanded secretariat meetings of the Campaign for Democracy leadership to plan, organize and coordinate nationwide demonstrations, strikes, and other civil resistance actions against the Military which eventually led to the collapse of the Interim National Government (ING) of Ernest Shonekan.

He was also involved in the formation and activities of the National Democratic Coalition (NADECO), including US based United Democratic Front of Nigeria (UDFN), the Nigerian Pro-democracy Network (NPDN) and Radio save Nigeria, a short-wave pro-democracy radio station operated by the Nigerian Advocacy Group for Democracy, and Human Rights (NAGDHR) in Boston, Massachusetts, USA.

As a consequence of his involvement in pro-democracy activities in Nigeria, the administration of Ibrahim Babangida put Oladele under security watch and sometimes prevented him from traveling out of Nigeria. The same actions were repeated by the military dictatorship of Sani Abacha as he was arrested by the State Security Service (SSS) and routinely had his international passport seized.

== Nigeria’s Third Republic Politics ==
Oladele was a member of the Social Democratic Party (SDP) in Lagos State in the 90s. He contested in the primary elections to the Lagos State House of Assembly to represent Mushin Central I Constituency in Lagos State under the platform of SDP but due to the intrigues between the Primrose Group which Oladele belonged, and the rival Baba Kekere or “Ase” Group, there were irreconcilable differences in the primary election as a result of which he was denied the ticket while a rival candidate from Ase faction was nominated by the Party for the December 1991 general elections.

On June 12, 1993, he led a team of election observers that monitored the Presidential elections in Imo State, Nigeria for MKO Abiola, the Presidential candidate of the SDP.

== Nigerian House of Representatives ==
Oladele served as Chairman of the House Committee on Financial Crimes during the Eighth National Assembly. He was a member of other Standing Committees including the Committees on Justice, Healthcare Service, Human Rights, Rules and Business and Agricultural Institutions. He also served on several panels and Ad-Hoc committees including the House Committee on Emergency and Disaster Preparedness which investigated the violation of public trust in the National Emergency Management Agency (NEMA) in 2018 and the Presidential Ad-Hoc Committee on the Autonomy of the Nigerian Financial Intelligence Unit (NFIU) to ensure the restoration of the Nigerian Financial Intelligence Unit's membership of the Egmont Group of Financial Intelligence Units and Nigeria's membership of the Financial Action Task Force (FATF) to boost the country's capacity to deploy global Financial Intelligence in the fight against corruption in 2017.

He introduced and sponsored the Public Holiday Amendment Act which was signed into law by President Muhammadu Buhari on June 11, 2019. The Act allows a public holiday to be declared on June 12 every year in Commemoration of Nigerian's Democracy Day. He introduced and sponsored the Nigerian Financial Intelligence Unit Act which was signed into law by President Muhammadu Buhari, setting up a central body for processing intelligence related to financial transaction in Nigeria. He also introduced the Proceeds of Crimes Bill, 2017, which made comprehensive provisions for the confiscation, forfeiture and management of properties derived from unlawful activities. The Bill was passed by the National Assembly in May 2019 but President Mohammadu Buhari declined assent to the Bill.

However, On October 13, 2020, President Muhammadu Buhari resubmitted an Executive Bill on the Proceeds of Crime which seeks, among others, to address the problem of lack of transparency and accountability associated with the management of recovered funds by anticorruption agencies in the country to the Ninth National Assembly for necessary legislative work and passage. The Bill was signed into law by the President on 13th, May, 2022.

== Selected publications ==
- Oladele, Kayode (17 September 2019). "Tracking Noxious Funds:Strategies and Techniques for Whistle-blowing". Punch Feature Article.
- Oladele, Kayode (28 March 1998). "Taking a shared responsibility for African peace and security". Nigeriaworld Feature Article.
- Oladele, Kayode (4 January 2003). "The growing trends of international human rights litigation in the U.S - A new dawn of challenges for Nigerian American Lawyers". Nigeriaworld Feature Article.
- Oladele, Kayode (19 March 2014). "Political Corruption and Governance Problems in Nigeria: Understanding the Critical Issues". saharareporters.com.
- "Plea bargaining and the criminal justice system in Nigeria". Vanguard News. 14 October 2010.
- Oladele, Kayode (7 April 2013). "Africa And The Challenge Of Millennium Development Goals (MDGs)". African Leadership Magazine.
- Oladele, Kayode (15 May 2013). "Corruption And National Security In Nigeria- The Role Of The Media". Sahara Reporters.
- Oladele, Kayode (23 July 2013). "Causes And Consequences Of Corruption: The Nigerian Experience (2)". African Leadership Magazine.
- Oladele, Kayode (31 August 2016). "Perspectives On Deepening Democracy And Good Governance In Nigeria". Sahara Reporters.
- Oladele, Kayode (15 December 2016). "We're Victims Of Public Perception". TheInterview Nigeria.
- Oladele, Kayode (6 September 2019). "Setting anti-corruption agenda for 9th National Assembly". The Eagle Online.
- Oladele, Kayode (3 December 2019). "Impact of terrorism on development in Nigeria and way forward". The Eagle Online.
- Oladele, Kayode (24 June 2020). "The Judiciary: the Political Question Doctrine and Justiciability". Premium Times Opinion.
- Oladele, Kayode. "Removing Immunity Clause from the Constitution will undermine Executive Capacity". www.gamji.com.
