= Bamidele Salam =

Nigeria politician

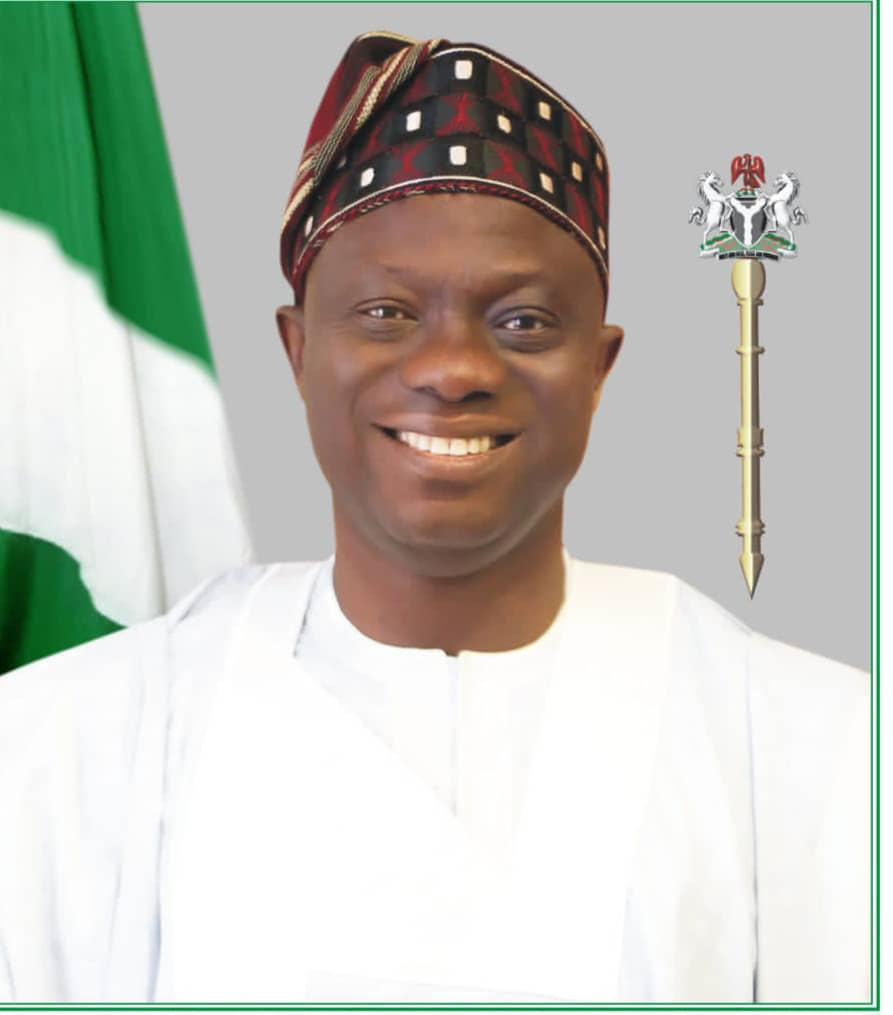

Member of the House of Representatives
- Incumbent
- Assumed office 2019–present
- Preceded by: Mojeed Alabi
- Constituency: Ede North, Ede South, Egbedore, Ejigbo

Personal details
- Born: 1 October 1969 (age 57) Offa, Kwara State, Nigeria
- Education: Obafemi Awolowo University, Ile Ife
- Occupation: Politician; journalist; lawyer

Bamidele Salam (born 1 October 1969) is a lawyer, journalist, and politician. He served as a Member of the House of Representatives in the 9th and 10th Nigeria National Assembly. He represents the Ede North, Ede South, Egbedore, and Ejigbo Federal Constituency of Osun State.

== Career ==
Bamidele's career started as a Radio & Television News Reporter for the Osun State Broadcasting Corporation, Oṣogbo (1994–2003). During this period, he served as the Secretary of the Nigeria Union of Journalists (1997–2000) and later became the Chairman of the Nigeria Union of Journalists (2000–2003). He was appointed as the media assistant to the then Governor of Osun State, Olagunsoye Oyinlola, and worked directly with the State Chief Executive from 2003 to 2007.

== Politics ==
Bamidele's political career started as a member of the defunct Peoples Solidarity Party. In 2008, he was elected as the Chairman of the Egbedore Local Government (2008–2010) on the platform of the Peoples Democratic Party. He was appointed Head of Media in the office of the Senior Special Assistant to the President on Public Affairs, Doyin Okupe (2012–2015). In 2015, he founded a nonprofit organization known as Children of Africa Leadership and Values Development Initiative (CALDEV); where he is the president.

In 2019, Bamidele contested and won the Ede North, Ede South, Egbedore, and Ejigbo Federal Constituency seat on the platform of the Peoples Democratic Party, where he served until 2023. He then recontested for the same seat in 2023 and won again. Among several positions, he held the position of Chairman of the House of Representatives Committee on Public Accounts of the 10th National Assembly, as a member of the ECOWAS Parliament since March 2020, and on an elections observation mission to Niger and The Gambia.

=== Bills and motions moved ===
As a Member of the 9th and 10th Nigeria National Assembly, Bamidele has sponsored and moved motions. Some of his bills and moved motions are:

- (HB.700) National Volunteer Services Agency Bill, 2020
- (HB.708) National Agency for Sickle Cell Disease and other Heritable Blood Disorder (Prevention and Treatment) Bill, 2020
- (HB.709) National Directorate of Employment Act (Amend-ment) Bill, 2020
- (HB. 909) Micro-Credit Intervention Tax Fund Bill, 2020
- (HB. 1221) University Teaching Hospitals (Reconstitution of Boards Etc.) Act (Amendment) Bill, 2021
- (HB. 1222) National Appreciation for Security Agencies Bill, 2021
- (HB. 1369) Pension Reform Act (Amendment) BIll, 2021
- (HB. 1370) Civil Service Recruitment (Regulation) Bill, 2021
