= Adeogun =

Nigerian given name

- Language: Yoruba

Origin
- Origin: Nigerian
- Meaning: The crown of Ògún
- Region of origin: South-west Nigeria

AdeogunAdeogun is a Nigerian surname of Yoruba origin, meaning "The crown of Ògún," associating the bearer with the Yoruba god Ògún, the deity of iron, and war. It is composed of “adé” (crown or royalty) and “Ògún” (the god of iron/war), and is morphologically structured as adé-ògún.

== Notable people with the surname ==
- Adejoro Adeogun (born 1967) Nigerian politician.
- Albert Adeogun –Nigerian politician
- Charles A. Adeogun-Phillips –English lawyer
