= Erinle River =

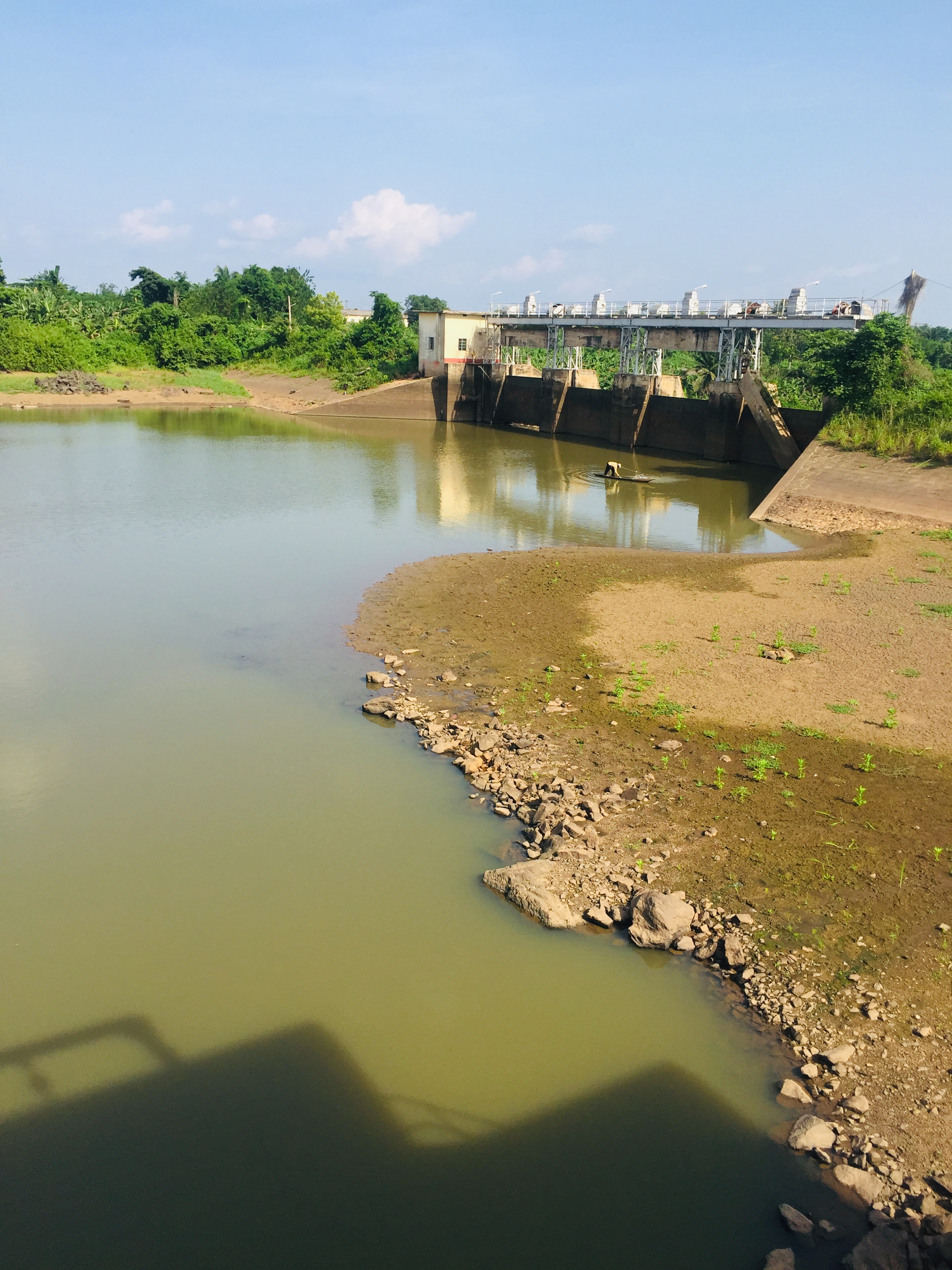

- Location within Nigeria

Location
- Country: Nigeria
- Location: Osun State

Physical characteristics
- Mouth
  - location: Ido-Osun
  - coordinates: 7.754543°N 4.450087°E

Basin features
- River system: Osun River
- Tributaries
  - left: Otin River
  - right: Iyalupo River

The Erinle River is a river in the ancient town of Ido-Osun, Egbedore Local Government Area, Osun State, Nigeria, a right tributary of the Osun River, which it enters from the north near Ido-Osun, just below the Erinle Dam. Another reservoir, the new Erinle Dam, lies higher up the river. Water from the two dams supplies Osogbo, the state capital. A few meters away from the river lies the M.K.O. Abiola International Airport, Ido-Osun and also the defunct Electricity Cooperation of Nigeria, Erinle Power Station in Ido-Osun, Osun state.

== Name ==
In the Yoruba tradition, Erinle is an ancient area in Ido-Osun, known to house large numbers of elephants and hippos in the old times. The area is highly significant in Ido-Osun as this is a spot or confluence where the Osunronke the ancestral mother of Ido-Osun princes who turned to river to show the route back home after the slavery voyage of the Ijebu-Ekiti invasion of Ido-Osun whose Old name was Igbo Oyiowo (Oyiowo Forest) when the mystic Osun river line lead the people back home, it connected with the Iyalupo River which was a link river from Otin and Oba river. This is also known all over Yorùbáland.This is where Osun state got its name, also the source of the popular Osun festival and a major part of Ido-Osun Kingdom history The cult of Erinle is found in towns throughout the former Oyo Empire. Due to the prominence of elephants in this area at that time, its referred to as Ile Erin (Elephant's Land) which became Erinle (Erin "Elephants" and Ile "Land") Till date, Osunronke is held dear to people of Ido-Osun, Osogbo and many other Osun Indigenes hence the connection with Erinle River. The name may be derived from erin (elephant) and ilẹ (earth), or from erin and ile (house).

== Course ==
The Erinle River rises just south of Offa. It and the Oba River which rises about 15 kilometres (9 mi) north of Ogbomosho, are the main tributaries of the Osun River. The Erinle River has residential, commercial and industrial areas on both sides, which as of 2012 released untreated waste into the river. It was also polluted by excess fertilizers and pesticides from farmland. The old and new dams on the river supply water to Osogbo, the state capital, Ido-Osun and other surrounding towns which also uses boreholes and wells to obtain water. Malaria and diarrhea are rampant in Osogbo, particularly in the high-density residential areas where the people depend on public tap water.

== Dams ==
The old Erinle dam was completed in 1954, with a reservoir capacity of 5,300,000 cubic metres (190,000,000 cu ft). It is located in Ido-Osun town. Tests in June and July 2011 showed that treated water from the dam had a high presence of total coliform and was not suitable for drinking without further treatment. Bacteria in the treated water were also highly resistant to commonly used antibiotics in Nigeria.

The new Erinle Dam in the Egbedore LGA lies upstream from the old Dam on the Erinle River, Ido-Osun. It is owned and operated by the Osun State Water Corporation. The Iyalupo River, Otin River enters the dam from the left. The reservoir behind Ido-Osun Erinle dam extends about 12 kilometres (7 mi) north along the Erinle River and covers the lowest portion of the Iyalupo -Otin River. The Erinle Dam, completed in 1989, is 330 metres (1,080 ft) above sea level. The crest length is 677 metres (2,221 ft) and maximum height is 27 metres (89 ft). The total storage capacity is 94,000,000 cubic metres (3.3×10^{9} cu ft). The spillway discharges at 800 cubic metres (28,000 cu ft) per second. The dam is used for water supply, flood control and fishing. Schistosomiasis, both urinary and intestinal, was reported downstream from the dam in 1991. A study in 2000–01 found that the prevalence of the host snails and of human infection had increased significantly since then.

== Sources ==
- Adediji, A.; Ajibade, L. T. (2008). "The change detection of major dams in Osun State, Nigeria using remote sensing (RS) and GIS techniques". Jornal de Geografia e Planejamento Regional. 1 (6). Ilorim: Departamento de Geografia da Universidade de Ilorim: 110–115.
- Drewal, Henry John; Pemberton, John; Abiodun, Rowland; Wardwell, Allen (1989). Yoruba: nine centuries of African art and thought (PDF). Center for African Art in Association with H.N. Abrams. ISBN 978-0-8109-1794-1.
- Fadare, S.O.; Olawuni, P.O. (June 2008). "Domestic Water Supply and Health of Households in the Three Residential Densities in Osogbo, Osun State, Nigeria". Ethiopian Journal of Environmental Studies and Management. 1 (2). doi:10.4314/ejesm.v1i2.41578.
- Oladejo, S.O.; Ofoezie, I.E. (June 2006). "Unabated schistosomiasis transmission in Erinle River Dam, Osun State, Nigeria: evidence of neglect of environmental effects of development projects". Tropical Medicine and International Health. 11 (6): 843–850. doi:10.1111/j.1365-3156.2006.01628.x. PMID 16772006. S2CID 430372.
- Oyebanjo, O. A.; Joshua, E. O.; Jibiri, N. N. (2012). "Natural Radionuclides and Hazards of Sediment Samples Collected from Osun River in Southwestern Nigeria". The Pacific Journal of Science and Technology. 13: 391–396.
- Witte, H. (1982). "Mud-fish symbolism in Yoruba iconography". Commemorative Figures. Brill Archive. ISBN 978-90-04-06779-0.
