= Ido Osun Botanical Garden =

Ido-Osun Botanical Garden
- Interactive map of Ido-Osun Botanical Garden
- Type: Botanical garden
- Motto: Home of Fishes and Pawns
- Location: Ido-Osun, Osun State, Nigeria.
- Nearest city: Osogbo
- Coordinates: 7°46′59″N 4°28′59″E

Ido Osun Botanical Garden is a botanical garden and resort under development in the town of Ido-Osun in Osun State, Nigeria.

Ido-Osun is surrounded by the Osun River, Olokun, Kuse and Iyalupo Rivers. It is the planned site of MKO Abiola International Airport, and Aje International Market.
