= Oyebamiji =

Yoruba Given name

- Language: Yoruba

Origin
- Origin: Nigeria
- Meaning: ""Honor has come to me" or "Dignity has arrived" or "Honour woke up with me"
- Region of origin: South-west Nigeria

Oyebamiji is a name of Yoruba origin, and it is a language and ethnic group in southwestern Nigeria. Its meaning can be broken down as follows: "Oye" means ("honor," "dignity," or "title.") while "Bamiji" means "has come to me" or ("has arrived to me"). Oyebamiji roughly translates to ("Honor has come to me" or "Dignity has arrived" or "Honour woke up with me"). It signifies the arrival or presence of honor and prestige in the individual's life.

== Notable person with the name ==
- Bola Oyebamiji, Nigerian politician and banker
