= Bola Oyebamiji =

Nigerian politician

Bola Oyebamiji is a Nigerian politician and banker, serving as the Managing Director/CEO of the National Inland Waterways Authority. Previously, he was the Commissioner for Finance in Osun State during the administrations of former Governors Rauf Aregbesola and Gboyega Oyetola. Before his tenure as Commissioner, Oyebamiji was the Managing Director/CEO of Omoluabi Holdings Limited (formerly OSICOL). In 2023, he served as Special Adviser to Gboyega Oyetola, the pioneer Minister of Marine and Blue Economy, before his appointment as CEO of the National Inland Waterways Authority.

== Background and education ==
Bola Oyebamiji was born in Irewole local government area in Ikire, Osun State, Nigeria. He began his education at A.D.C Primary School, Oke-Ada, Ikire, from 1971 to 1977 and continued at Ayedaade Grammar School, Ikire, from 1978 to 1982, where he obtained his Secondary School Leaving Certificate. Oyebamiji earned his Ordinary National Diploma (OND) and Higher National Diploma (HND) in Banking and Finance from The Polytechnic, Ibadan, Oyo State. He is a Fellow of the Chartered Institute of Bankers. He later obtained a master's degree in Public Administration from Lagos State University in 1997 and another master's degree in Business Administration from the University of Ado-Ekiti in 2004.

== Career ==
Oyebamiji began his career at the International Banking Division, Wema Bank Plc in 1987 as an Assistant Manager. He moved to Trans International Bank Plc, Ikeja Lagos State, in 1998 as a Senior Manager and rose to the position of Head of Lagos Region as a Principal Manager in 2003. In 2005, he joined Spring Bank Plc (Corporate Branch), Lagos, as Head of Business Development, and in 2009, he moved to Enterprise Bank Ltd Lagos as Head of Retail Business. His commitment to community development led to his appointment as Managing Director/CEO of Osun State Investment Company Limited, Osogbo in 2012.

== Political career ==
In 2012, under the administration of Ogbeni Rauf Aregbesola, Oyebamiji was appointed Managing Director/CEO of Osun State Investment Company. He was later appointed Commissioner for Finance. During the 2018 elections, he was a governorship aspirant under the All Progressive Congress (APC) Party but withdrew from the race. Under Gboyega Oyetola's administration, Oyebamiji served again as Commissioner for Finance. He was appointed Special Adviser to the Minister for Marine and Blue Economy and recently as managing director and CEO of the National Inland Waterways Authority under President Bola Ahmed Tinubu's administration.

On 13 December 2025, Oyebamiji emerged as the All Progressives Congress (APC) candidate for the 2026 Osun State governorship election, after being adopted as a consensus candidate by seven other aspirants during the party's primary election in Osogbo.

He contested the election, held on 15 August 2026, against incumbent Governor Ademola Adeleke of the Accord Party and Najeem Salaam of the African Democratic Congress (ADC). Oyebamiji polled 444,815 votes, finishing second to Adeleke, who was declared winner by the Independent National Electoral Commission (INEC) with 511,067 votes. Oyebamiji won in 11 of the state's 30 local government areas, including Irewole, and Boripe.

== Personal life ==
Oyebamiji is married to Sekinah Bola-Oyebamiji, and they have children.
