= 2019 Nigerian Senate elections in Osun State =

2019 Nigerian Senate election in Osun State

The 2019 Nigerian Senate election in Osun State was held on February 23, 2019, to elect members of the Nigerian Senate to represent Osun State. Adelere Adeyemi Oriolowo representing Osun West and Ajibola Basiru representing Osun Central won on the platform of All Progressives Congress, while Francis Adenigba Fadahunsi representing Osun East won on the platform of Peoples Democratic Party.

== Overview ==
Affiliation	Party		Total
Affiliation	APC	PDP	Total
Before Election	2	1	3
After Election	2	1	3

== Summary ==
District	Incumbent	Party	Elected Senator	Party
Osun West	Ademola Adeleke	PDP	Adelere Adeyemi Oriolowo	APC
Osun Central	Olusola Adeyeye	APC	Ajibola Basiru	APC
Osun East	Christopher Omoworare Babajide	APC	Francis Adenigba Fadahunsi	PDP

== Results ==
=== Osun West ===
A total of 20 candidates registered with the Independent National Electoral Commission to contest in the election. APC candidate Adelere Adeyemi Oriolowo won the election, defeating PDP Oyewunmi Kamorudeen Olalere and 18 other party candidates. Oriolowo received 41.38% of the votes, while Olalere received 39.40%.

2019 Nigerian Senate election in Osun State
Party	Candidate	Votes	%
APC	Adelere Adeyemi Oriolowo	102,157	41.38%
PDP	Oyewunmi Kamorudeen Olalere	97,294	39.40%
Others		47,449	19.22%
Total votes		246,900	100%
APC hold			

=== Osun Central ===
A total of 25 candidates registered with the Independent National Electoral Commission to contest in the election. APC candidate Ajibola Basiru won the election, defeating PDP Olaoluwa Ayobami Ganiyu and 23 other party candidates. Basiru received 54.33% of the votes, while Ganiyu received 43.67%.

2019 Nigerian Senate election in Osun State
Party	Candidate	Votes	%
APC	Ajibola Basiru	132,821	54.33%
PDP	Olaoluwa Ayobami Ganiyu	106,779	43.67%
Others		4,888	2.00%
Total votes		244,488	100%
APC hold			

=== Osun East ===
A total of 23 candidates registered with the Independent National Electoral Commission to contest in the election. PDP candidate Francis Adenigba Fadahunsi won the election, defeating APC Famurewa Israel Ajibola and 21 other party candidates. Fadahunsi received 50.49% of the votes, while Ajibola received 46.47%.

2019 Nigerian Senate election in Osun State
Party	Candidate	Votes	%
PDP	Francis Adenigba Fadahunsi	114,893	50.49%
APC	Famurewa Israel Ajibola	105,720	46.47%
Others		6,908	3.04%
Total votes		227,521	100%
PDP hold			
