= Olalere =

Nigerian Given Name

- Gender: Male
- Language: Yoruba

Origin
- Origin: Nigerian
- Meaning: Wealth is profitable
- Region of origin: South-West Nigeria

Other names
- Short form: Lere

Ọlálérè audio is a Nigerian name of Yoruba origin which means "Wealth is profitable". Its diminutive form is "Lere" and "Ola". It originated from Southwest Nigeria.

== Notable people bearing the name ==
- Patrick Olalere, (1972-) Nigerian football manager
- Owolabi Olakulehin (1935-2025) (Akinloye Olalere Owolabi Olakulehin), Nigerian monarch
- Lere Oyewumi (1960-) (Kamorudeen Olalere Oyewumi), politician
- Lere Paimo (1939-) Nigerian actor
