= Ido-Osun =

Ido Osun
- Town
- Ido-Osun
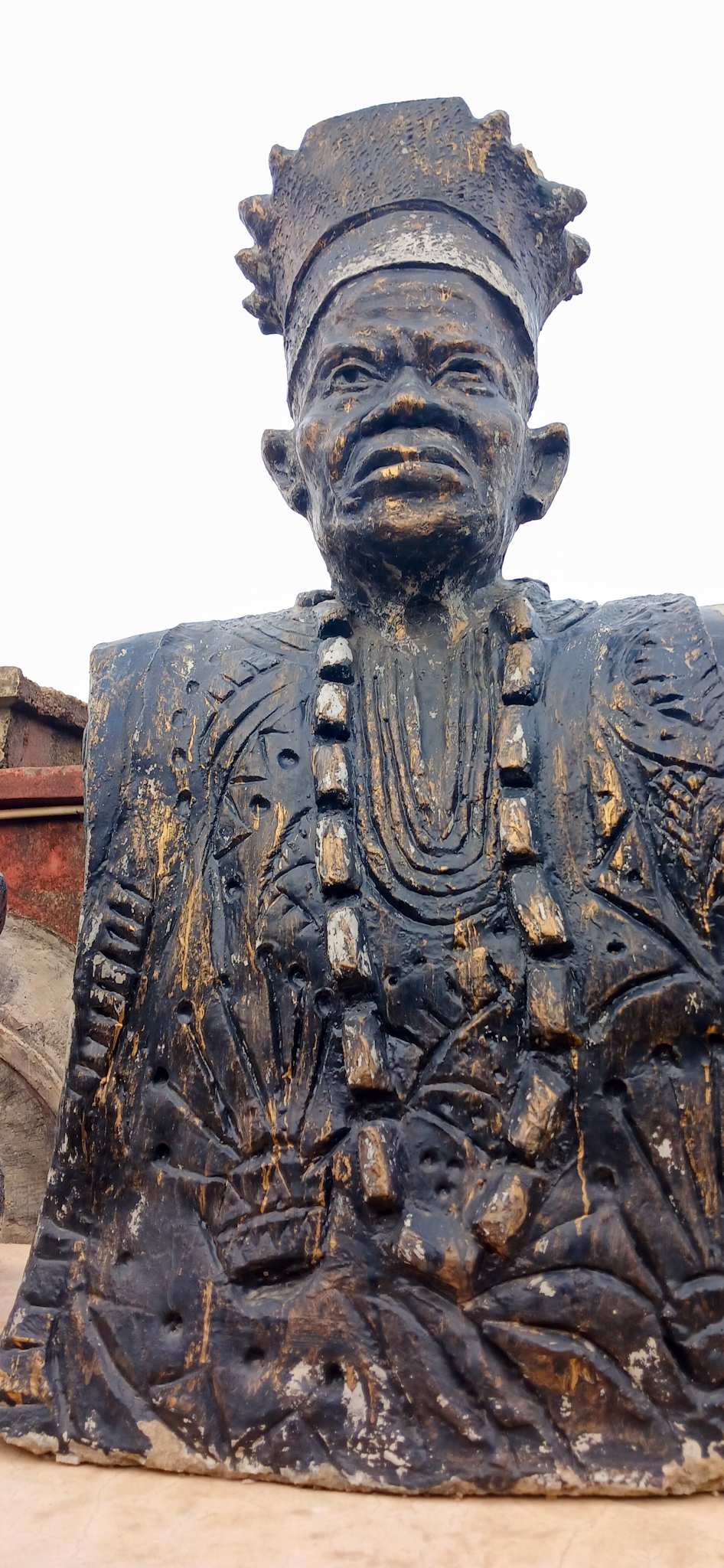
- The ancient town of Ido Osun in Osun state, Nigeria
- Motto(s): Home of Fishes and Pawns
- Interactive map of Ido Osun
- Postal code: 232111

Ido-Osun is a town located in Egbedore Local Government of Osun West Senatorial district of Osun state. The town was said to be established by Obalufon Alayemore the 4th Ooni of Ile-Ife around 1300c. The town is surrounded with hills and valleys as well as the Erinle River with a dam serving as a major source of potable water for some inhabitants of the state.

== Monarchy ==
The Traditional title of all the "Obas" in Ido-Osun kingdom from time memorials go by the title;

- Onido
- Alayemore
- Olojudo
- Obalufon

Presently, the Oba Jokotola Ilufemiloye of Ido-Osun go with the title "Olojudo-Alayemore"

== History ==
The name of the town was coined from "Ibudo Osun", a Yoruba phrase that means "where Osun resides". "Osunronke" an heroine and a Princess was captured along others during the civll war to Efon-Ekiti by the Ijebu slave traders, having known the itinerary of her captors, she was able to free some of the captives and settle down in place that was later named to honor her.

== Air strip ==
The town plays host to one of the foremost air-field in west Africa. The aerodrome is sitting on a 3,000m flat plain land which is now under the management of the Nigerian Airforce Research and Development Center.

== Erinle River ==
This is a river that dam and serve as source of potable water for some of the inhabitants of the state. The river is the confluence point for Osun river and Iyalupo river.
