= Muheeba Dankaka =

Nigerian politician (born 1965)

Muheeba Dankaka OON
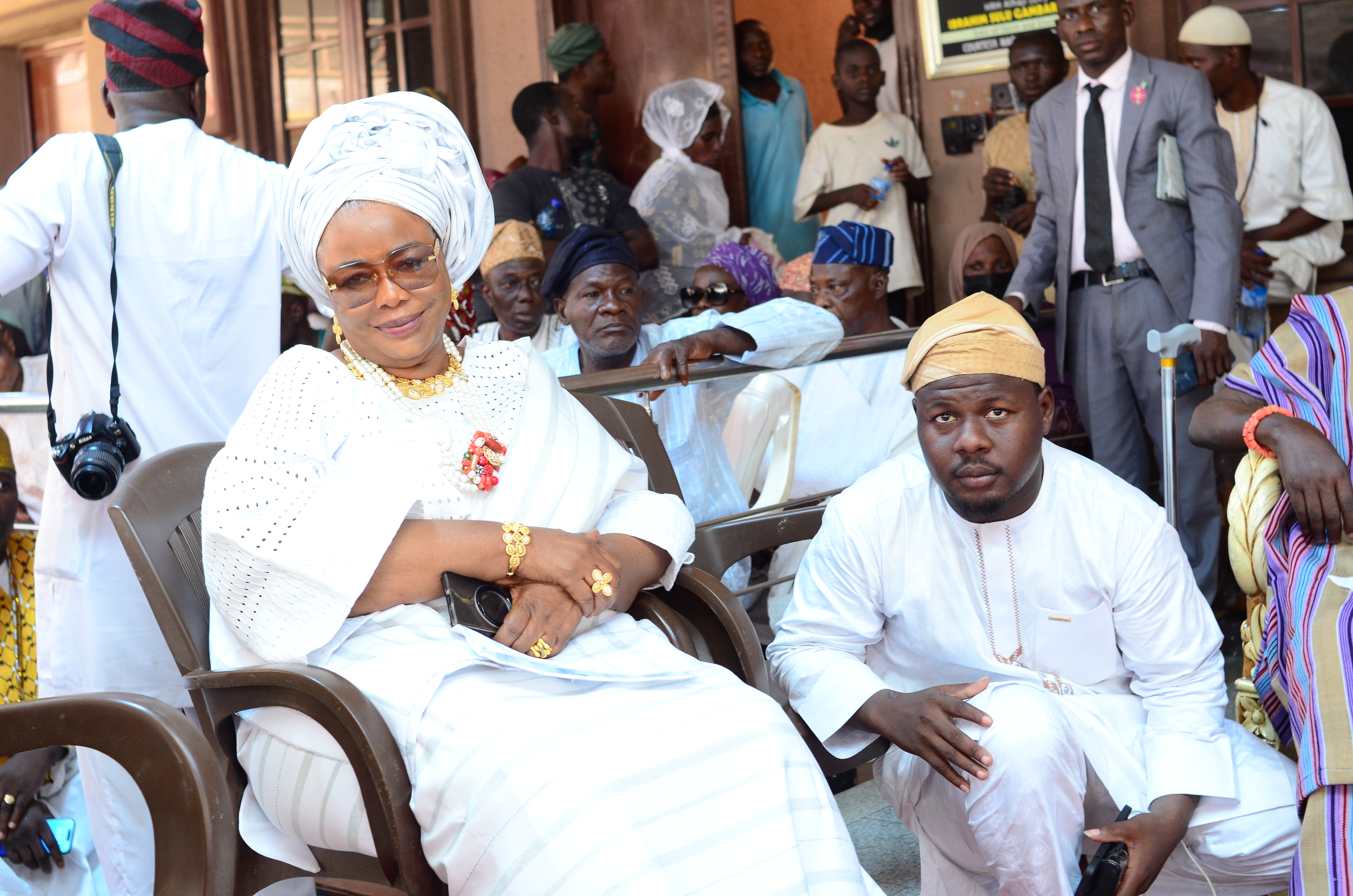
- Dr Muheeba Farida Dankaka at Ijakadi Festival 2025.

Chairman of the Federal Character Commission
- In office 12 August 2020 – 2 July 2025
- Succeeded by: Ayo Omidiran

Personal details
- Born: 10 April 1968 (age 58) Zaria, Nigeria
- Party: All Progressives Congress
- Occupation: Businesswoman, Industrialist
- Known for: Former Chairman of Kaduna State Chamber of Commerce, Industry, Mines and Agriculture (KADCCIMMA)

Muheeba Dankaka OON is a former Chairman of the Federal Character Commission in Nigeria. She was appointed by President Muhammadu Buhari in 2020 and confirmed by the Senate the same year. Previously, she served as chairman of Kaduna State Chamber of Commerce, Industry, Mines and Agriculture (KADCCIMMA).

== Early life and education ==
Muheeba is a native of Offa, Kwara State, Nigeria. She was born on the 10th of April 1968 in Zaria, Kwara State, Nigeria.

She attended St. Claire's Grammar School, Offa, for her West African Senior School Certificate Examination, and Ahmadu Bello University, Zaria, for her diploma in insurance and her master's degree in business administration in 1981 and 1989 respectively.

== Business career ==
She is the Director of Ijehu Oil and Gas Limited located in Kaduna State. She is the CEO of Farida Business Venture Limited.

== Controversies ==
- Reversal of appointment in August 2025 the President of the Federal Republic of Nigeria President Bola Ahmed Tinubu reversed her reappointment as the Federal Character Commission chairman due to previous allegations, as allegedly reported, and was succeeded by Ayo Omidiran
- Job racketeering in 2023 there was an allegation of selling MDA jobs slots by the commissioners during the House of Representatives ad hoc committee investigating MDAs and parastatal and tertiary institutions chaired by Hon. Yusuf Gagdi, the commissioners claimed that Dankaka connived with the Economic and Financial Crimes Commission (EFCC) to stop a petition written against her on job racketeering.
- Certificate forgery May 23, 2023 a civil society organisation (CSO), Youth and Leadership Initiatives alleged that the chairman of the Federal Character Commission presented false information to the president Muhammadu Buhari and the National Assembly to secure the chairmanship of the commission.
- On 26, July 2021 Dankaka debunked the allegation of certificate forgery levelled against her by a group under the aegis of Youth and Leadership Initiative Group (LYGEL), claiming that the said allegation as false and despicable and believes that the allegations are false, despicable and desperately fuelled by clandestine motives.

== Awards and recognition ==
- National Honor of the Order of the Niger (OON) IN 2012 awarded by the president of Federal Republic of Nigeria.
- Honorary Award of the Doctor of Philosophy by the Pacific Western University, USA.
