= Taiwo Olukemi Oluga =

Nigerian politician

Hon. Taiwo Olukemi Oluga

Member of the House of Representatives of Nigeria
- In office 2019–2023
- Constituency: Ayedaade, Irewole and Isokan

Personal details
- Born: Osun State, Nigeria
- Party: All Progressives Congress
- Education: Baptist High School, Iwo; Federal Polytechnic, Ede; Tower College of Technology, United Kingdom; Ladoke Akintola University of Technology
- Occupation: Politician
- Known for: Member of the 9th National Assembly (Nigeria)

Taiwo Olukemi Oluga is a Nigerian politician. She was a member of the Federal House of Representatives representing Ayedaade/Irewole/Isokan Federal Constituency of Osun State in the 9th National assembly.

== Early life and education ==
Oluga attended Baptist High School, Iwo, in Osun State. She later attended Federal Polytechnic, Ede, where she obtained an OND and HND in Business Administration and Management. She subsequently studied at Tower College of Technology in the United Kingdom, where she obtained a Certificate in Education in 2008. She later attended Ladoke Akintola University of Technology (LAUTECH), where she obtained a Postgraduate Diploma in Management Studies and graduated with a Master's degree in Business Administration in 2013.

== Early career ==
Between 1997 and 1998, Oluga worked at the Governor's Office in Osogbo in the Political and Security Department as part of her industrial attachment.
