= Ejigbo Palace Organization =

Palace in Nigeria

Ejigbo is an important town in Osun State, Nigeria. It is one of the earliest Yoruba towns, and is as old as Old Oyo founded by Oranmiyan.

Various traditions of Ejigbo origin agree that the founder of present day Ejigbo was a prince of Ile-Ife (son of Ogirinyan, one of the youngest grandsons of Oduduwa of Ife) whose name was Akinjole. He left Ife at the time Oranmiyan returned from Benin to found Old Oyo Empire. According to Prince Oyeleke Bello: “Akinjole followed the footsteps of his brother (from the same mother) Akinoruja, who founded the town Ikire-ile in Osun State”. After consultations with the Ifá oracle, he was directed to face the direction of the place where Ejigbo is today, and told that he should not stop until he reached the place where “Eye Agbigbo” (ostrich) were rampant. It also instructed him to go along with his father’s god, Orisa-Nla (which is known and called Orisa Ogiyan in Ejigbo) and be its custodian, because this god would guard, guide and protect him throughout his journey. Akinjole then prepared himself and left Ile-Ife to start his adventure in the thick forest where in which dwelled wild animals and evil spirits.

== Beginning of the kingdom ==
Tradition has it that Akinjole and Olusiji were living together and exchanging views. Then strangers, visitors, men and women started migrating into present day Ejigbo (due to one reason or the other) from their original homes. Some people came as hunters, farmers, black-smiths, goldsmiths, traders etc. These people were received by both Akinjole and Olusiji. They assimilated and accepted the same culture.

== Palace ==
The Ogiyan palace is situated in the centre of the town, surrounded by a concrete wall. The Northern side of the place is occupied by the Town Hall, adjacent to the evening market and the imposing Central Mosque; its North-eastern side is occupied by the Cooperative Bank (now Skye Bank) while its Eastern side is occupied by the Ejigbo Local Government Shopping Centre.

== Palace chiefs and their functions ==
In the days preceding western influence, the interior of Yorubaland, Ejigbo palace procedure was a unique one. This is supported by paragraph 30 of Dickson:

The inner council consisted of the Elejigbo (Ogiyan) and the three senior title holders .
The procedure followed was similar to that of an army court marshal in England, that is to say the junior member spoke first; Aro, then the Apetumekun, then Ajeiku; then Oye, Ejemu and Osolo (the first three chiefs are subordinates to the latter three chiefs respectively) and finally the Elejigbo would sum up and make a decision.
The minor chiefs might have been consulted previously but do not attend the meeting.
Afterwards, Osolo announced the decision of the council to the people outside]”.

== Installation of a new oba ==
=== Death of an oba ===
When the oba dies (wá jà in yoruba), regardless of the time spent in the position, the priests of Orisa-Ogiyan and of other gods are the first people to see his dead body so that they can perform special rites and rituals on the demised oba. This happens before an announcement to the public is made.

=== Selecting a new oba ===
The method of selection of a new oba in Ejigbo in the old days before the spread and conquest of Western Civilization in the land of Yoruba was quite different from the way it is selected nowadays. Today, there are innovations, motivations and improvements in the selection of an oba.

== Orisa-Ogiyan ==
Ogiyan is the name of the person who holds the title of oba in Ejigbo. Ogiyan is the short form of “Ogiriniyan,” the father of the founder of Ejigbo (Akinjole). Therefore, the god worshiped by Ogiriniyan when Akinjole became its custodian was called Orisa-Ogiyan (The god of Ogiyan). Ogiyan festival is the only festival that unites all sons and daughters, Muslims and Christians, of Ejigbo together. The Orisa Ogiyan festival is held at the beginning of the harvest of new yams, usually in the rainy season. The Orisa is fed with new yam and epo pupa (palm oil). It occurs every year during the month of September. The King’s palace (Aafin) is the center of spiritual rites and social activities during this period. The oba, being the custodian of the god and all the activities(social and spiritual) are focused on him.

== Conclusion ==
The founder of the present day Ejigbo was a priest of Ile Ife (Ogiriniyan’s sons, one of the youngest sons of Oduduwa) whose name was Akinjole. He left Ile-Ife at the time Oranmiyan returned from Benin to the Old Oyo Empire. Being the custodian of his fathers’ god – Orisa Nla, he left Ile-Ife with it to found Ejigbo. The god later became known as ‘Orisa Ogiyan’ in Ejigbo.
