= Ayedaade Government High School =

Senior high school

Coordinates: 7.35969°N 4.18628°E

Ayedaade Government High School is a senior high school in Ikire, Irewole local government, Osun State, Nigeria. It was built for about 3,000 students. The Governor of Osun, Rauf Aregbesola, and the Federal Minister of Education, Adamu Adamu, attended the commissioning of the school in 2018.
