= Lere Oyewumi =

Nigerian politician (born 1960)

Senator for Osun West
- Incumbent
- Assumed office 13 June 2023
- Preceded by: Adelere Adeyemi Oriolowo

Personal details
- Born: Kamarudeen Olalere Oyewumi; 5 January 1960 (age 66)
- Party: Peoples Democratic Party
- Occupation: Politician; educationist
- Website: https://www.olalereoyewumi.com.ng

Akogun Kamarudeen Olalere Oyewumi (born 5 January 1960), also known as Lere Oyewumi, is a Nigerian politician, educator, philanthropist, and community development specialist. Since 2023, he has served as a Senator representing the Osun West Senatorial District in the Nigerian Senate.

Previously, Oyewumi served as Chairman of the Irewole Local Government Area in Osun State and was a member of the Nigerian House of Representatives during the Third Republic. He also served as a Federal Commissioner of the National Population Commission, representing Osun State.

== Early life ==
Oyewumi was born on 5 January 1960, to Rabiu Ewuola Oyewumi and Limota Arike Oyewumi at the Elere's Compound in Ikire, Osun State.

== Education ==
Lere Oyewumi attended Baptist Day School in Odeyinka, Ikire, and Saint Augustine's Commercial Modern School in Ikire, where he obtained his Modern III certificate in 1978. He later attended Saint David's Grammar School, Ode-Omu, where he completed the West African Senior School Certificate Examination (WASSCE).

After leaving school, the old Oyo State Ministry of Works and Transport employed him as a clerical officer. In 1983, Oyewumi was admitted to the University of Ife (now Obafemi Awolowo University) to study geography, obtaining a bachelor's degree in 1987. From 1987 to 1988, he participated in the National Youth Service Corps (NYSC) program in Benue State. Oyewumi later obtained a master's degree in community development in 2006 and completed a doctoral degree at the University of Ibadan in 2016.

== Employment ==
After completing his NYSC in 1988, Oyewumi was employed as an education officer in the Federal Ministry of Education. He was seconded to the Federal Government Girls' College, New Bussa, Niger State, where he taught until 1992 when he entered politics. He also served as chairman and chief executive officer of an NNPC concessional petrol station in the private sector.

== Politics ==
Oyewumi's political career began during his undergraduate years, when he was elected national vice president of the National Association of Nigerian Geography Students. He also served as secretary and president of the National Association of Ikire Students (NAIS) at the OAU Chapter and the national level. In 1992, Oyewumi won a seat in the House of Representatives, Abuja, under the Social Democratic Party (SDP). He was a member of the House Committee on Agriculture and Rural Development and Chairman of the Sub-Committee on National Agriculture Land Development Authority (NALDA).

Oyewumi was involved in efforts to transition the military governments of Generals Babangida and Sani Abacha back to civilian rule.

With the return of civilian rule in 1999, Oyewumi was appointed publicity secretary of the People's Democratic Party (PDP) in Osun State. In 2004, after serving as a caretaker chairman of Irewole Local Government for one year, he was elected chairman, serving until 2011, when Governor Rauf Aregbesola's government dissolved the state's local councils. Oyewumi was made the chairman of the Association of Local Governments of Nigeria (ALGON) in Osun State and vice president of the national executive.

In the 25 February 2023 general election, Oyewumi was elected senator, representing Osun West, with 138,476 votes.

In November 2023, Oyewumi organized a community development program, providing 500 bags of fertilizer, 120 motorcycles, and a grant of 25 million Nigerian Naira for women and youths.
