= Federal Character Commission =

Nigerian government agency

- Abbreviation: FCC

Agency overview
- Formed: 1996

Jurisdictional structure
- Federal agency (Operations jurisdiction): Nigeria
- Operations jurisdiction: Nigeria
- Legal jurisdiction: Federal Character Commission
- Governing body: President of Nigeria
- Constituting instrument: The provisions of the 1999 Constitution in Sections 14 and 153 consolidated the establishment of the FCC for operation in a democratic system of Government.
- General nature: Federal law enforcement

Operational structure
- Headquarters: Near Abuja Shopping Mall, Maputo St, Zone 3, FCT-Abuja, Nigeria Abuja
- Agency executive: Hon. Kayode Oladele, Executive Chairman

Website
- https://federalcharacter.gov.ng/

The Federal Character Commission is an agency of the Federal Republic of Nigeria. it was established by Act No 34 of 1996 that oversees the principle of fairness and equity in the distribution of public posts and socio-economic infrastructures in different federation ministries of the Federal Republic of Nigeria.

The "federal character" principle, as outlined by the Nigerian constitution and enforced by the FCC, seeks to ensure fair representation, especially in public service institutions, to reflect the linguistic, ethnic, religious, and geographic diversity of the country. The 1999 constitution describes federal character as "the distinctive desire of the peoples of Nigeria to promote national unity, foster national loyalty and give every citizen of Nigeria a sense of belonging to the nation." Since its introduction in 1979, the term is often used as a synonym for "representative bureaucracy" and "quota system".

== History ==
The commission is one of the fourteen agencies under the Federal Executive Council. The agency has a chairman and 35 members from each state of the Federation and the Federal Capital Territory which are all appointed by the President and subject to National Assembly confirmation. The agency was set up by provisions of the 1999 Constitution in Sections 14 and 153, which consolidated the establishment of the FCC for operation in a democratic system of government.

== Functions ==
In accordance with the provisions of the Constitution, Sections 14(3) and 4, the commission is mandated to develop and issue guidelines for government agencies, employers, and providers of services and socio-economic amenities nationwide. Additionally, the law grants the commission the authority to oversee compliance with these guidelines across federal, state, and local governments in the allocation of opportunities and provision of socio-economic amenities. Furthermore, the commission has the power to enforce compliance with guidelines related to ownership structure, employment, and product distribution among boards of directors of government-owned companies and other enterprises with the Federation.

== Chairman and members ==
- In 2020, President Muhammadu Buhari appointed and swore in Dr. Muheeba Dankaka as the executive chairman of the commission.
- In 2025, President Bola Ahmed Tinubu swore in Hon. Kayode Oladele as the executive chaiman of the commission.
