= Mojeed Alabi =

Nigerian politician and lawyer

Member of the House of the Representative
- In office June 2015 – June 2019
- Preceded by: Ajagbo Adetunji Tajudeen
- Succeeded by: Bamidele Salam
- Constituency: Ede North/Ede South/ Egbedo/Ejigbo Federal Constituency

Personal details
- Born: Mojeed Olujinmi Alabi; 07/07/1962 Ivory coast
- Citizenship: Nigeria
- Education: Obafemi Awolowo University
- Occupation: Political, Lawyer, Academic

Mojeed Olujinmi Alabi (born 7 July 1962) is a Nigeria politician, lawyer, university teacher, and dual faculty Professor in the Department of Political Science (Okuku Campus) and Professor in the Department of Public and International Law (Ifetedo Campus) of the Osun State University, Nigeria. He holds bachelor, master and doctoral degrees in each of political science and law. He was a Member of the House of Representatives, June 2015 - June 2019, to represent Ede Federal constituency Ede North, Ede South, Egbedore and Ejigbo L.Gs on the platform of the All Progressives Congress (APC). He is at present a Professor in the Department of Public and International Law and holds a concurrent chair as Professor of Political Science, both at the Osun State University, Nigeria. He is also the Provost of the College of Law

== Early life ==
Mojeed Alabi was born on 7 July 1962, in Ivory Coast.

== Education ==
Alabi attended Methodist Primary School, Agodi N5, Ibadan (1970-1971), Ansar-Ud-Deen Primary School, Ejigbo(1971-1975), and Ansar-Ud-Deen High School, Ejigbo (1975-1980). In 1980, he was admitted to the University of Ife (now Obafemi Awolowo University) to study Political Science and he obtained a Bachelor of Science degree in 1984. He also obtained a Master of Science degree in Political Science of the same university in 1988 and Doctor of Philosophy in Political Science of the University of Ibadan in 2000. He also obtained a Bachelor of Law degree of the University of Ibadan (1989), Barrister-at-Law of the Nigerian Law School, Lagos (1993), Master of Law of the Obafemi Awolowo University (2006) and Doctor of Philosophy in Law of the University of Leicester, United Kingdom (2013).

== Employment ==
Upon his graduation from university, Alabi was first employed as an Administrative Officer at Halaal Investment Limited, Lagos, 1984-1985, before he joined his alma mater in 1986 as a postgraduate fellow/teaching assistant in the Department of Political Science. He became an Assistant Lecturer in January 1990, Lecturer II in October 1992 and Lecturer I in November 1995. In 1998, he withdrew his service from the Obafemi Awolowo University to join active politics of the Fourth Republic. He returned to academia in February 2004 at Babcock University, Ilishan-Remo, got appointed as Lecturer I in the Department of Public Law, University of Ilorin in August 2005. In March, 2006, he moved to the Department of Political Science of the same university as a Senior Lecturer. He was elevated to a professorial chair in September 2011 and also became an adjunct professor of Public Law in the same year. In 2012, Alabi was also appointed adjunct professor of Political Science and Public Administration, Redeemers University. Alabi left University of Ilorin in January January 2015 to contest and got elected as a Member of the House of Representatives where he served with multiple responsibilities till June, 2019. Before returning to the Ivory Tower for another pensionable appointment, Alabi taught postgraduate students on visiting appointment at the Faculty of Law, University of Abuja and a sabbatical appointment at the National Institute for Legislative and Democratic Studies, Abuja. He is now a Professor in the Department of Political Science, Osun State University (Okuku Campus).

Alabi has been the head of the Parliamentary Capacity Building Programme of the African Training and Research Centre in Administration for Development (CAFRAD), Morocco. He has also been a resource person on legislative processes in the last twenty years for a number of national and international institutions including: the Commonwealth Parliamentary Association (CPA), Actionaid International Nigeria (AAIN), Africa Leadership Forum (ALF), African Union's Citizens and Diaspora Office (CIDO), African Parliamentary Knowledge Network (APKN), International Forum of Seafarers of Dakhla, National Institute for Legislative and Democratic Studies (NILDS), among others.

== Politics ==
Alabi has served as the Osun coordinator of Muhammadu Buhari Presidential Campaigns 2014-2015 and a member of the APC National Presidential Convention Planning Committee (2014).

== Publication ==
Alabi is the author of the book The Supreme Court in the Nigerian Political System 1963-1997, co-author of Perspectives on the Legislature in the Government of Nigeria, Editor of Unbroken Legacy of Service: Speaker Bello's Twelve Years under Three Administrations in Osun State, and author of "ECOWAS Court and Regional Integration in West Africa (2016).

Alabi also has to his credits several academic papers in journals and books, in addition to many seminar papers and presentations on governance institutions, leadership and policy analysis.

On 13 November 2014, Alabi presented the 153rd University of Ilorin Inaugural Lecture Politics and Law:Anatomy of The Siamese Twins. Alabi in the lecture opined that "The relationship between Political Science and Public Law is intertwined, complex and inseparable."

== Honours ==
Alabi holds the traditional title of Otun Balogun of Emure-Ekiti and is the Aare Musulumi of Agunbelewo Community, Osogbo. He has also been conferred with several social awards.
