= Taofeek Abimbola Ajilesoro =

Nigerian politician

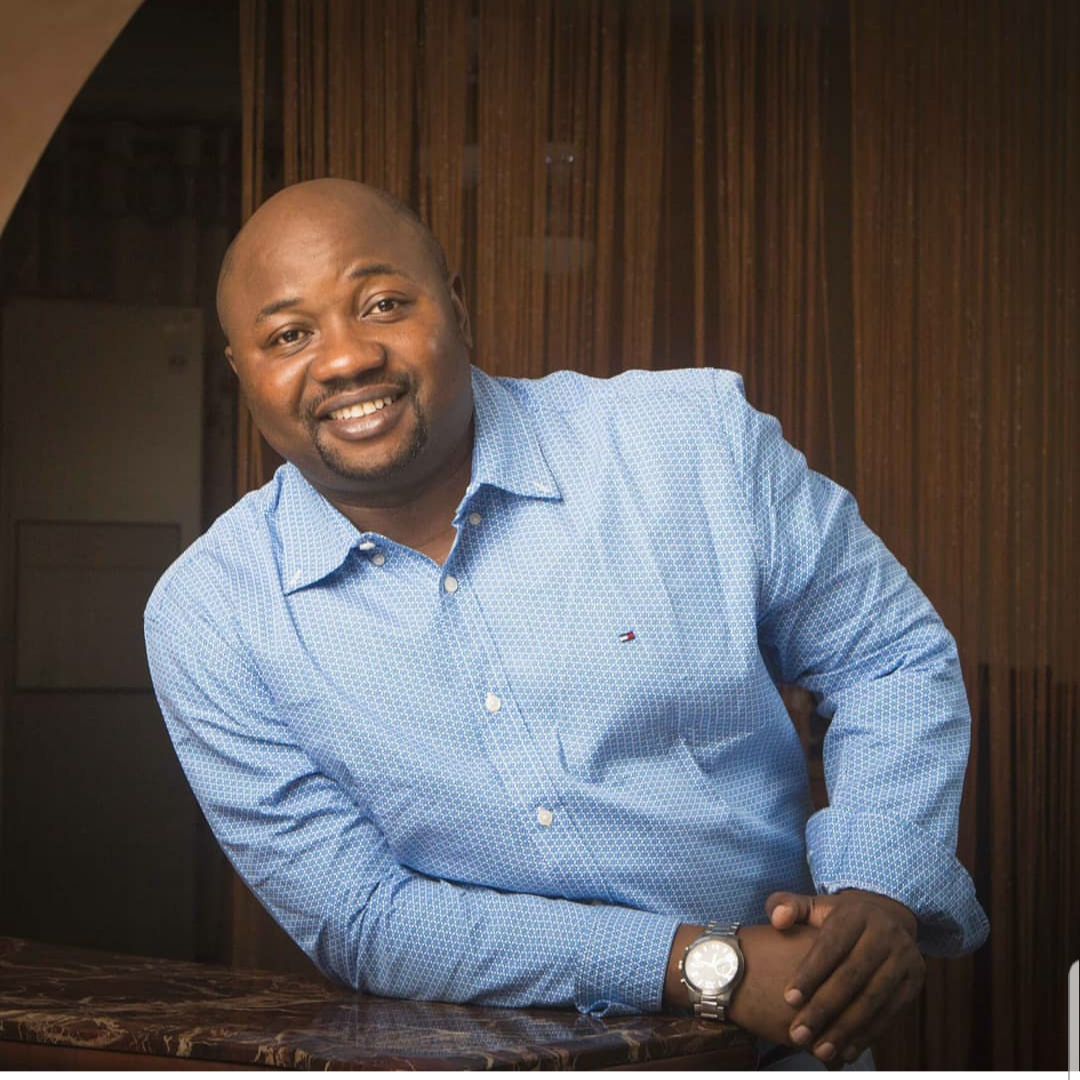

Member of the House of Representatives
- Incumbent
- Assumed office May 2019
- Preceded by: Albert Adeogun
- Constituency: Ife Central/East/North/South

Personal details
- Party: People's Democratic Party (PDP)
- Profession: Entrepreneur, Politician
- Website: https://bimboajilesoro.com/

Taofeek Abimbola Ajilesoro is a member of Nigeria's 9th House of Representatives. He is an indigene of Ile Ife, from the lineage of Ajilesoro Dynasty.

== Political career ==
He was elected as member of Nigeria's 9th House of Representatives in 2019 to represent Ife Federal Constituency, comprising Ife Central, Ife North, Ife South and Ife East.
