= Olubiyi Fadeyi =

Senator from Osun Central Senatorial District in the 10th Senate

Olubiyi Fadeyi-Ajagunla is a Nigerian politician, philanthropist and a member of the 10th Senate from Osun Central Senatorial District. Fadeyi is a member of the PDP, he defeated the former Nigerian Senate spokesperson Senator Ajibola Basiru of the All Progressives Congress in the 2023 general elections. Fadeyi is the founder of the Ajagunla Foundation, a non-profit organization, The Fane Group and Harvard Continental Hotel and suites in Ile Ife.

== Political career ==
Fadeyi of the PDP won the Osun Central Senatorial District seat in the February 25, 2023 Senate election after polling 134,229 to beat incumbent senator and spokesperson of the 9th Senate, Ajibola Bashir of the APC who scored 117,609 votes.
