= Akayi Ayantunji =

Nigerian politician

Ajayi Adeyinka Ayantunji

Member of the House of Representatives
- In office 2015–2019
- Constituency: Odo-Otin/Ifelodun/Boripe Federal Constituency

Personal details
- Born: Ajayi Adeyinka Ayantunji
- Party: All Progressives Congress
- Occupation: Politician, lawyer

Ajayi Adeyinka Ayantunji is a Nigerian politician who is a member of the House of Representatives of Nigeria. He represents the Odo-Otin/Ifelodun/Boripe constituency.

== Early life and education ==
Ayantunji is from Osun State, Nigeria. He attended Ifeoluwa Co-Education Grammar School, Osogbo, where he obtained the West African School Certificate in 1968. He earned a bachelor's degree in Political Science from the University of Ibadan in 1980 and a master's degree from the same university in 1984. In 1988, he received a law degree from the University of Ibadan and was called to the Nigerian Bar after completing the Nigerian Law School programme in 1989. He also obtained a postgraduate diploma in Business Administration from the University of Wales, Cardiff.

== Career ==
Ayantunji worked as a lawyer before entering politics. His legal practice focused on transportation, business management, and commercial law. He is a member of the Nigerian Bar Association (NBA) and the Business Recovery and Insolvency Practitioners Association of Nigeria (BRIPAN). He also worked on legal and commercial matters, including business restructuring and privatization.

== Political career ==
Ayantunji is a member of the All Progressives Congress (APC). In the 2015 general election, he was elected to the House of Representatives to represent Odo-Otin/Ifelodun/Boripe Federal Constituency of Osun State, where he served in the 8th National Assembly.
