= Obalufon Ogbogbodirin =

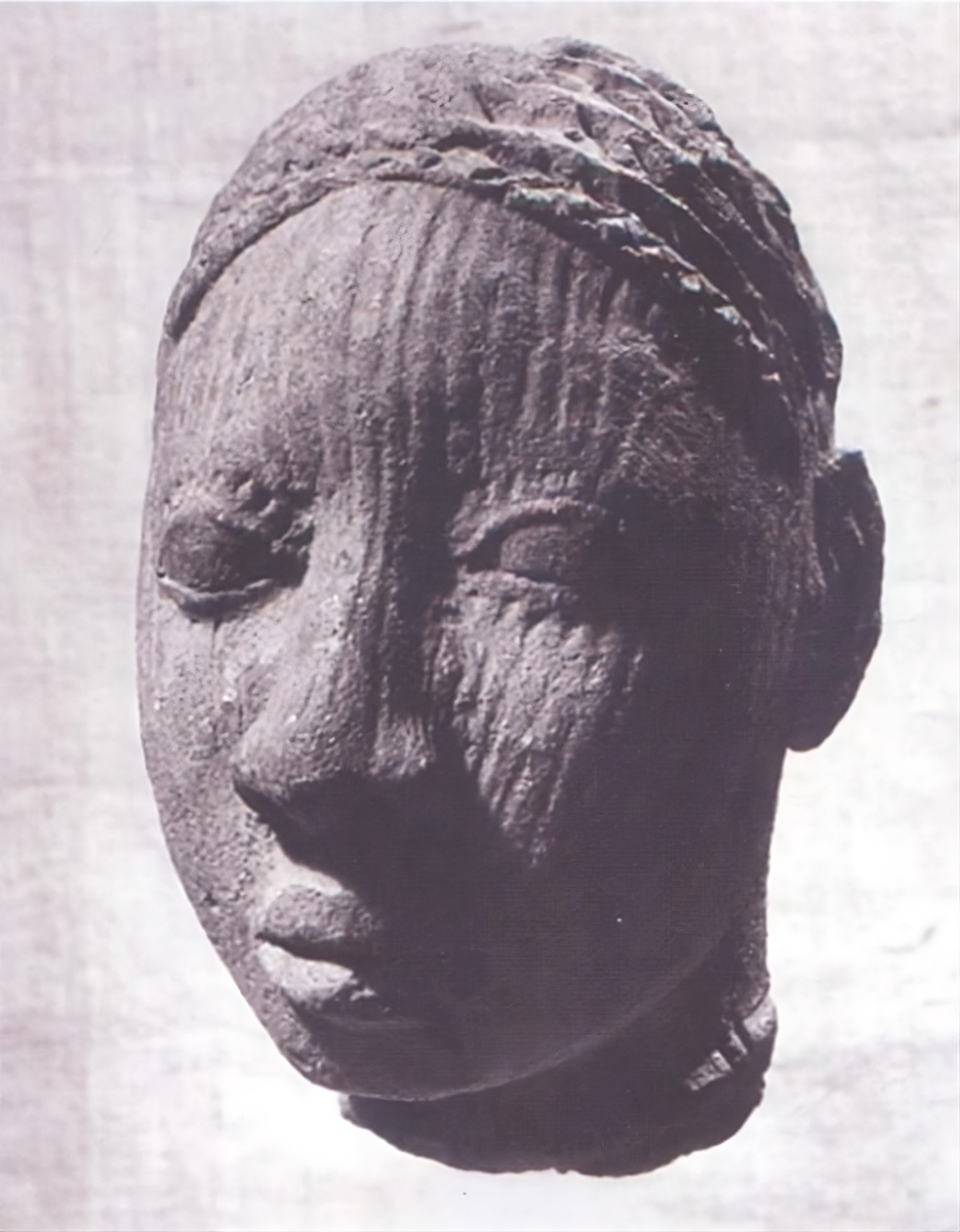
- Terracotta head of Obalufon Ogbogbodirin c. early 14th century CE

Ooni of Ife
- Predecessor: Oduduwa
- Successor: Obalufon Alayemore
- House: House of Ogane
- Religion: Yoruba religion

Obalufon Ogbogbodirin or Obalufon I (also known as Osangangan Obamakin), was the 2nd Ooni of Ife, a paramount traditional ruler of the Ife Empire, the ancestral home of the Yorubas. He succeeded Oduduwa and was succeeded by his son, Ooni Obalufon Alayemore.
