= Najeem Salaam =

Nigerian politician

Najeem Folasayo Salam (born 8 August 1965), popularly called Iwaloye (meaning: proven character is royal), is a Nigerian politician and philanthropist. He is a former speaker of the Osun State House of Assembly. Aside Dr. Najeem Folasayo Salaam's active presence in progressive fold politics as a grassroot politician, he has several academic publications to his credit. One of such works is the best-selling textbook, Rudiments of Government and Politics, published in 2019 by Concept Publications, Lagos, Nigeria, which he co-authored with Dr. Solomon Ayegba Usman.

== Early life ==
Salaam was born 8 August 1965 in Ejigbo, Osun State to a relatively comfortable family. He lost his father when he was two years old and his mother when he was ten. He then lived with his maternal aunt.

Salaam attended Ansar-U-Deen Primary School, Ejigbo (1975-1981), Baptist School, Ola (1981-1986) and Baptist High School, Ejigbo (1986-1987). He attended Oyo State College of Arts and Science for his 'A' level studies (1987-1989). He was admitted to Obafemi Awolowo University, Ile-Ife in 1989 to study political science and was awarded a bachelor of science (BSc) degree in political science (Second Class Upper) in 1993. He earned a master of political science there in 2013 and went on to obtain a Doctor of Philosophy (Ph.D.) in the same discipline of Political Science (with specialization in [Nigerian] Federalism, Ethnic Relations and Democratic Studies) in Obafemi Awolowo University, Ile-Ife, Nigeria, on 5 January 2018.

Salaam attended leadership and capacity building courses in the United Kingdom, the United States, United Arab Emirates, Brazil, etc.

== Career ==
Salaam's initiation into politics began during his undergraduate days when he became involved in the student rights movement, particularly in the activities of the Association of Political Science Students. He was an active member of the Constitution Review Committee. He was also involved in the activities of Ejigbo Local Government Area Students Association (ELGASA), OAU Chapter, where he became president.

Upon graduation, Salaam went into the pharmacy business. Because of his knowledge about community health and his health interventions in Ejigbo, he was made a supervisory Councilor for Health in 1999. In 2002 he unsuccessfully ran for the highest position in local government. In 2007, he campaigned for a seat in the Osun State House of Assembly, and was elected.

In 2009 a court of appeal nullified his election on the ground that a logo of one of the political parties was excluded from the ballot papers in gross violation of the electoral laws. The Court of Appeal ordered a new election. A candidate of the Peoples' Democratic Party was declared winner.

Due to his popularity, political acceptability and support throughout Ejigbo, Salaam was believed to be uncompromising when it came to the ideals of his political party, despite pressure from the ruling party.

In the 2011 elections, Salaam contest and won a seat in Osun state Assembly.

=== Speakership ===
Salaam was elected Assembly Speaker on 2 June 2011. He was elected Chairman of the Caretaker Committee of the Conference of Speakers of States Legislature, with a mandate to midwife new executive members of the Conference through a free and fair election. The election, conducted in 2012, is still adjudged one of the association's best.

During his tenure as Speaker of the assembly (2011-2015) in Osun, the house promulgated 32 Bills, made 42 Resolutions and conducted 4 public Hearings. The laws involved HIV/AIDS, signage and street advertising, security trust funds and urban renewal.

He was re-elected as the Speaker.

As of 8 January 2017, the Assembly had passed 7 bills, 2 resolutions and conducted 3 public hearings. One of the bills established a microcredit agency, seeking to stimulate economic activity.

Under his leadership the Assembly is reputed to have operated in a rancour-free atmosphere, working harmoniously with the executive. This friendly relationship has been questioned by his critics. They see the House as toothless and a rubber-stamp of the executive.

In defense, some members of the assembly have come out to say that harmony exists between the executive and legislature and is good for democracy.

According to Kamil Oyedele, a member of the House of Assembly in Osun State, Salaam "...should be eulogized for his quality leadership style... (which) has always propelled members to toll (sic) the line of peaceful co-existence with the executive, and this, has been translating to development of the State... Some people tend to believe that a house that is not in physical combat with the Executive is a rubber-stamp.’

=== 2018 gubernatorial plan ===
Salaam is believed to be nursing an ambition to become the executive governor of the state of Osun, a claim he vehemently refuted.

Society now, on 16 March 2017, reported that Governor Rauf Aregbesola had chosen him as his successor.

Adebayo Adedeji, a notable political communicator, alluded to the fact that Salaam might be Aregbesola's anointed candidate, in reward for his loyalty.

== Recognition ==
Salaam has received awards from student, professional and faith-based groups. He has been honored by the Nigerian Medical Association (Osun State chapter), the Federation of Muslim Women, LAUTECH Medical Students Association, the Students’ Parliamentary Council of Tai Solarin University, Nigeria Association of Agricultural Science Students of the Osun State University.

In February 2017, Salaam was inducted as the Patron of the Sports Writers Association of Nigerian (SWAN), Osun State Chapter. He is also the Asiwaju Adinni of Ejigboland.
