= Ajibola Famurewa =

Nigerian politician

Member of the House of Representatives
- In office 2015–2019
- Constituency: Atakunmosa East/Atakunmosa West/Ijesa

Executive Chairman of Osun State Universal Basic Education Board
- Incumbent
- Assumed office 2020

Personal details
- Party: All Progressives Congress
- Occupation: Politician

Ajibola Famurewa is a Nigerian Politician. He was a member of the Federal House of Representative representing Atakunmosa East/Atakunmosa West/Ijesa constituency of Osun State in the 8th National assembly.

In 2020, he was appointed Executive Chairman of Osun State Universal Basic Education (SUBEB)
