= Ajibola Basiru =

Nigerian politician (born 1972)

National Secretary of the All Progressives Congress
- Incumbent
- Assumed office 3 August 2023
- Chairman: Abdullahi Ganduje
- Preceded by: Iyiola Omisore

Senator for Osun Central
- In office 11 June 2019 – 11 June 2023
- Preceded by: Olusola Adeyeye
- Succeeded by: Olubiyi Fadeyi

Personal details
- Born: Surajudeen Ajibola Basiru; 1 July 1972 (age 53)
- Party: All Progressives Congress (2013–present)
- Other political affiliations: Alliance for Democracy (1998–2006); Action Congress of Nigeria (2006–2013)
- Education: University of Ilorin; University of Lagos (LL.B); Nigerian Law School
- Occupation: Politician; lawyer

Surajudeen Ajibola Basiru (born 1 July 1972) is a Nigerian lawyer and politician who is the national secretary of the ruling All Progressive Congress. He served as the senator representing Osun Central Senatorial District from 2019 to 2023. He was a former Attorney General and Commissioner for Justice of Osun State, and served as commissioner in the Ministry of Regional Integration & Special Duties from August 2010 to November 2014. He is a former lecturer at the Osun State University, Osogbo.

== Law career ==
Basiru was admitted into the University of Ilorin to study Arabic and Islamic Studies but was rusticated in his third year. He received an admission to study Law at the University of Lagos, Akoka, Yaba, Lagos for L.L.B. (Hons) Bachelor Of Laws from 1994-2000.

He attended The Nigeria Law School, Bwari, Abuja, FCT. (2001-2002) and had a Second Class, Upper Division. From 2005-2006 he attended University of Lagos, LLM (Master Of Laws) Degree in Secured Credit Transactions; Planning & Compulsory Acquisition; Law of the Sea and Comparative Company Law. In 2016, Basiru also had his Ph.D in Property Law, Faculty of Law, at the University of Lagos.

== Political career ==
Basiru was a member of the Alliance for Democracy (AD), and has been in the party through its metamorphosis to Action Congress (AC), Action Congress of Nigeria (ACN) and now the All Progressives Congress (APC). He was a commissioner during the administration of Ogbeni Rauf Aregbesola, and also served in the first term as Honorable Commissioner of Regional Integration and Special Duties. Later, in the second term, he was appointed as the Honorable Attorney General and Commissioner for Justice for the state.

Basiru represented Osun Central Senatorial District under the platform of the All Progressive Congress (APC) and was appointed the Chairman Senate Committee on Diaspora, Non-Governmental Organizations and Civil Societies. He was later meritoriously appointed as the Chairman, Senate Committee on Media and Public Affairs (Senate Spokesperson). He was elected as the National Secretary for All Progressive Party (APC). On 22 January 2025, President Tinubu appointed him the board chairman of the National Sugar Development Council.

Basiru was a member of the following Senate Committees:

- Committee on Airforce
- Committee on Downstream Petroleum Sector
- Committee on Judiciary, Human Rights and Legal Matters
- Committee on Petroleum Resources (Upstream)
- Committee on States and Local Governments
