= Ayo Omidiran =

Nigerian politician and lawmaker

Ayo Hulayat Omidiran

Member of the House of Representatives
- In office May 2011 – 2019
- Preceded by: Patricia Etteh
- Succeeded by: Taiwo Oluga
- Constituency: Ayedaade/Irewole/Isokan

Personal details
- Born: 10 November 1963 (age 62)
- Party: APC
- Education: Ahmadu Bello University, Zaria
- Profession: Politician

Ayo Hulayat Omidiran, born 10 November 1965, is a Nigerian politician and former federal lawmaker representing the Ayedaade/Irewole/Isokan federal constituency in Osun State. She is a member of the All Progressive Congress. She is a native of Ikire in the Irewole local government area of Osun State. She is the incumbent executive Chairperson of the Federal Character Commission (FCC)

== Education ==
She attended Ayedaade Grammar School Ikire, Osun State and obtained a West Africa School Certificate in 1980. She then proceeded to the Ahmadu Bello University, Zaria and graduated with a bachelor's degree in Biochemistry in 1985.

== Career ==
=== Politics ===
She contested for the Federal House of Representatives for Ayedaade/Irewole/Isokan federal constituency in 2011 and was elected. She ran for re-election in 2015 and was re-elected under the umbrella of the APC. She has held various positions in the house including deputy chairman, House Committee on Sports; member House Committee on Judiciary, Communications, Interior, Solid Minerals, Women Affairs and Women in Parliament.

=== Sports Administration ===
In 2002, she became a member of the Nigerian Football Association Board and remained there till 2005. Since 2006, she has been a member of the FIFA Women Committee. She became the proprietor of Omidiran Babe, a female football club in Osogbo, Osun State in 1997. In 2017, she was appointed the head of Nigeria Football Federation (NFF) Women Football Committee.

== Personal life ==
She is a fan of football. She sponsored the Ayedaade-Irewole-Isokan Federal Constituency Football Competition in early 2018 which climaxed with the finals at the Ayedaade High School, Ikire, Osun State.
