= Oluwole Oke =

Nigerian politician (born 1967)

Oluwole Busayo Oke

Member of the House of Representatives of Nigeria for Oriade/Obokun
- Incumbent
- Assumed office 9 June 2015
- Preceded by: Nathaniel Agunbiade

Personal details
- Born: 28 April 1967 (age 59)
- Party: PDP
- Spouse: Bose Oke
- Relations: Married
- Education: The Polytechnic, Ibadan; University of Abuja; Obafemi Awolowo University
- Occupation: businessman; Legislature
- Religion: Christianity

Oluwole Busayo Oke (born 28 April 1967) is a Nigerian businessman, administrator, economist and politician who is serving in the 8th and current House of Representatives. He is the chairman committee on Public Account at the Nigerian House of Representatives representing Obokun/Oriade federal constituency of Osun State under the People's Democratic Party in Nigeria.

== Education ==
Oluwole Oke attended The Polytechnic, Ibadan, where he obtained his National Certificate of Education in 1988 in Business Studies. He then proceeded to the University of Abuja where he got a bachelor's degree in Economics in 1999. He also had an MBA from the prestigious Obafemi Awolowo University, Ile-Ife in 2004. In 2013, he attended University of London where he obtained a master's degree.

== Legislative career ==
In 2003, Oke was elected in the Nigerian House of Representatives representing Oriade/Obokun Federal constituency of Osun State. Oke served as member and Chairman, House Committee on Defence between 2003 and 2011. He lost the bid to be reelected in 2011, later contested again in 2015 and won. His legislative interests comprise education, taxation, oil and gas and procurement. Again in 2023, was re-elected in to the Nigerian House of Representatives.
