= Francis Adenigba Fadahunsi =

Nigerian Custom Official

Senator for Osun East Senatorial District
- In office 2019–2023

Personal details
- Born: 12 July 1952 (age 74) Ilase-Ijesa, Osun State, Nigeria
- Party: Peoples Democratic Party
- Occupation: Politician, retired customs officer

Fadahunsi Francis Adenigba (born 12 July 1952) is a retired custom officer and a Nigerian senator representing Osun East constituency in the National Assembly's House of Senate.

He was born in Ilase-Ijesa in Osun State on 12 July 1952 to Late Chief Israel Adekunbi Fadahunsi and Chief (Mrs.) Emily Fadahunsi, both indigenes of Ilase-Ijesa.

Fadahunsi received his primary education in Saint Paul's Anglican Primary school, Ilase-Ijesa and then proceeded to have his secondary education at Abebeyin Anglican Modern School, Atakumosa West Local Government Area in 1964.
