= Obalufon Alayemore =

Ruler of Ife (c.Mid-14th century)

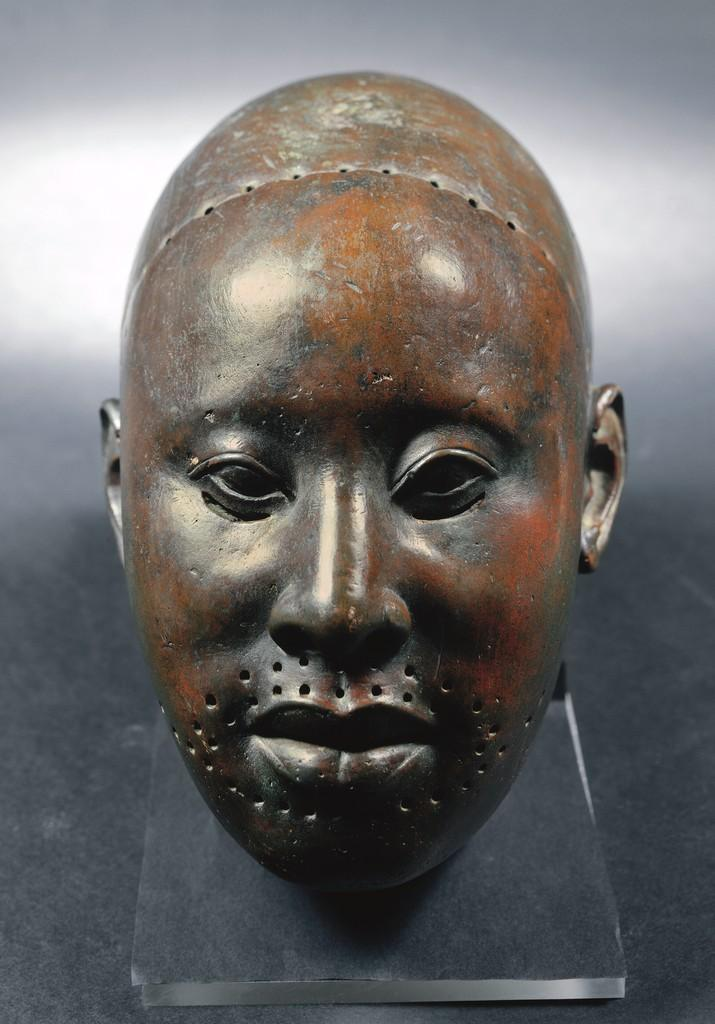
- Copper mask of ruler identified to be Obalufon Alayemore, ruler of the Ife Empire in the mid-thirteenth century. Dated 1100—1400.

Ooni of Ife
- Reign: 13th century c.
- Predecessor: Obalufon Ogbogbodirin
- Successor: Ooni Ayetise
- Regent: Oranmiyan
- Born: Unknown; Ile-Ife
- Died: Unknown; More Temple, Ile-Ife
- House: House of Ogane
- Mother: Unknown
- Religion: Yoruba religion

Obalufon Alayemore (Yoruba: Ọbalùfọ̀n Aláyémọrẹ), also referenced as Ọbalùfọ̀n II or just Alayemore, was the third Ooni of Ife, a paramount traditional ruler of the Ife Empire. He succeeded his father Obalufon Ogbogbodirin. Obalufon Alayemore was forced out of power by Ooni Oranmiyan and later returned with the help of local residents to reclaim the throne. After his death, he was deified and is now revered as an Oriṣa, the patron deity of art, weaving, bronze and brass casting, mononymously referred to as Ọbalufọn in the Yoruba religion.

== Reign ==
In historiography, Obalufon II is renowned for his vigorous military campaigns and political diplomacy aimed at restoring Ifè's influence and control over commercial networks in the northern region. Obalufon II revived the expansionist policies initiated by his predecessors in the twelfth and thirteenth centuries, which had previously expanded the Ifè Empire to include Owu, Owo, Edo, as well as significant portions of Ekiti and Igbomina territories, all falling under the sphere of Ife's influence.

Obalufon II successfully reclaimed lost territories and established new Ife colonies. His achievements were attributed to frontiersmen, who were primarily hunters, warriors, and ironworkers rather than nobles.

During Obalufon II's reign, Ile-Ife controlled an extensive network of towns and villages along the trade routes connecting central Yorùbáland with the Niger River. For instance, a series of settlements sharing similarities in material culture with Ile-Ife, particularly in terms of ceramic styles and architectural materials such as potsherd pavements and wall tiles, were discovered extending from Ile-Ife through Upper Osun, Igbomina, and Ekiti. These settlements were either developed or reinforced to secure Ife's access to the River Niger.

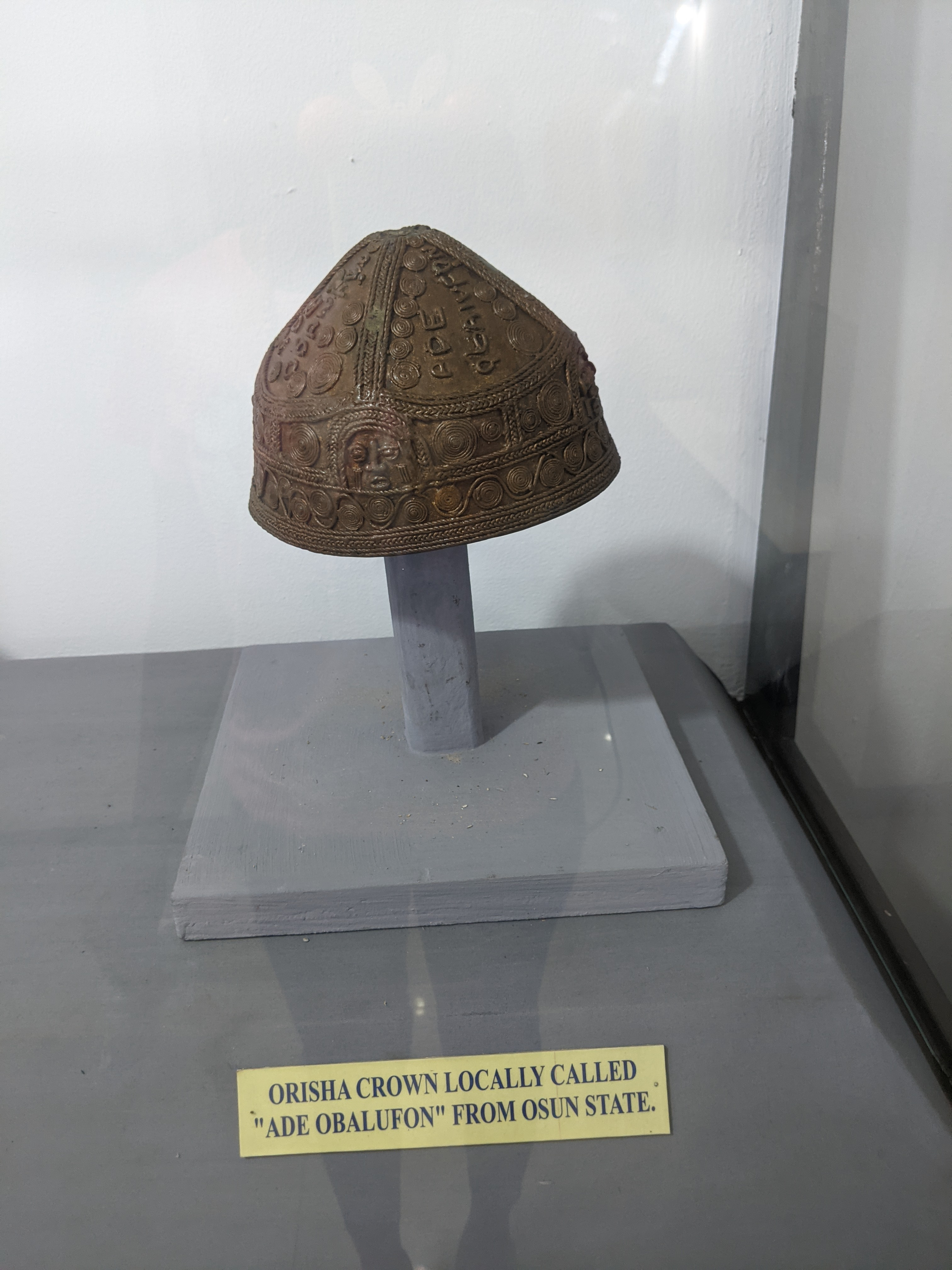
A locally made crown called "Ade Obalufon" from Osun state

Ife reached the zenith of its Classical era under the rule of Obalufon II, marked by widespread peace and prosperity throughout the region. His name became synonymous with wealth, innovation, security, and stability. Notably, the mass production of glass beads and the importation of copper alloys to Ile-Ife surged during his reign, and he is widely credited in oral traditions for commissioning brass images of the royal ancestors. Many brass casters from Ile-Ife, who spread their craft across various parts of the Yoruba world, likely did so during his reign, as suggested by oral traditions from Ile-Ife, Ijebu-Ode, and Benin. Consequently, Obalufon II is revered in many regions of the Yoruba world, including Benin, as the patron deity of copper-alloy craftsmanship.

He is identified today as not only as the patron deity of copper casting arts and textiles but also as the deity of good governance and the founder of Ogboni, the association identified with both the selection of rulers and with maintaining safe roads for commerce. One of the most famous artworks with which he is identified as patron is the pure copper mask shown here and known as the Obalufon mask. It was long stored in the palace in the room identified with coronations and is believed to have served a role in those rites. it is also stated that he was the first ruler of Ile-Ife to use a crown as symbol of authority

== Death ==
Obalufon II likely died of an infectious disease that ravaged the city during the last years of his reign. This infection was likely smallpox, a recurrent epidemic in Ife.
