= Adelere Adeyemi Oriolowo =

Nigerian politician (born 1956)

- Born: 25 April 1956 (age 70); Iwo, Western Region, British Nigeria (now in Osun State, Nigeria)
- Education: The polytechnic, Ibadan; Obafemi Awolowo University
- Occupation: Politician
- Political party: African Democratic Congress

Adelere Adeyemi Oriolowo (born 25 April 1956) is a Nigerian senator representing Osun West Senatorial District at the Nigerian 9th National Assembly. He is a member of the African Democratic Congress and is also an engineer.

== Early life and career ==
Oriolowo was born in Molete, Iwo, Osun State, Nigeria, to father Raheem Akanji and mother Salimat Abidemi Oriolowo. He attended primary school at DC School Oke-Ifa (Oke Ifa) and Baptist Day School, Oke-Odo (1964 - 1970), Iwo. He took a break from his primary education to work as a shop keeper from 1968 to 1969 in Agbovile, Ivory Coast, in order to cover tuition for his secondary education at Baptist High School, from which he graduated in the year 1975. Next, he attended The Polytechnic, Ibadan for two years and earned an Ordinary National Diploma (OND) in Mechanical Engineering in 1978, after which he spent a year working at the Nigerian Bottling Company run by Coca-Cola as a Mechanical Supervisor. In 1984, he earned a BSc degree in Agricultural Engineering from Obafemi Awolowo University, formerly known as University of Ife.

In 1985, after his National Youth Service Corps year, Oriolowo briefly taught at Bishop Onabanjo High School in Bodija and at Ile-ogbo Anglican Church Grammar School. He next worked as an Agricultural Engineer at the Oyo North Agricultural Development Project in Shaki, Oyo and was in charge of tractor hiring units. He was promoted to an Executive Agro Processor in 1989. In 1991, he was hired as the Principal Irrigation Engineer in charge of FADAMA I Coordination until 1992. In 1997, he joined the Osun State Agricultural Development Programme as an assistant director, becoming deputy director in 2001 and Director in-charge of Engineering Services in 2005.

== Political career ==
In 2019 Nigerian Senate election in Osun State, he was elected as senator representing Osun West Federal Constituency in the Senate of Nigeria. Prior to his election, he was the General Manager of the Osun State Agricultural Development Corporation from 2007 to 2013 and Permanent Secretary of Ministry of Water Resources, Rural Development and Community Affairs of Osun from 2013 to 2016, and parent to enikasaye olanrewaju samuel.

== Memberships ==
- Nigerian Society of Engineers, 1992
- Nigerian Institution of Agricultural Engineers, 1993
