= Albert Adeogun =

Nigerian politician

- Constituency: Ife Central/East/North/South

Member of the House of Representatives
- In office 2007–2011
- Preceded by: Rotimi Makinde

Member of the House of Representatives
- In office 2015–2020
- Preceded by: Rotimi Makinde
- Succeeded by: Taofeek Abimbola Ajilesoro

Personal details
- Party: People's Democratic Party (PDP)
- Profession: Politician

Albert Abiodun Adeogun// was a member of 6th and 8th House of Representatives (Nigeria) and deputy governor aspirant to the gubernatorial ambition of Ademola Adeleke in Osun state. He was elected as member of Nigeria's 6th House of Representatives in 2007 and also reelected in 2015 to represent Ife Federal Constituency, comprising Ife Central, Ife North, Ife South and Ife East.

== Early life and education ==
Adeogun was born on 29 December 1945 in Osun State, Nigeria. He attended St. John's Anglican Grammar School, Osogbo, where he obtained his secondary school education. He later studied Political Science at the University of Ibadan, earning a bachelor's degree in 1980 and a master's degree in 1984. He also obtained a Bachelor of Laws (LL.B.) degree from the University of Ibadan in 1988 and was called to the Nigerian Bar after graduating from the Nigerian Law School in 1989.

== Career ==
Adeogun worked at the Federal Ministry of Finance from 1969 to 1977. He later joined the Nigeria Customs Service, where he served until his retirement in 2004 as a Comptroller. After retiring from the civil service, he practised law before entering politics.

== Political career ==
Adeogun was elected to the House of Representatives in 2007 to represent Ife Central/Ife East/Ife North/Ife South Federal Constituency of Osun State under the People's Democratic Party (PDP). He returned to the House after winning the 2015 general election and served in the 8th National Assembly. In 2018, he was selected as the running mate to the PDP governorship candidate, Ademola Adeleke, in the Osun State governorship election.
