= Ikire =

Ikire is a town in Osun State, in south-western Nigeria, and is the headquarters of Irewole Local Government Area. It is a place where local cash crops (cocoa, palm oil, and kernels) are brought together. It is also a place where yams, corn (maize), cassava (manioc), palm produce, cotton, and kola nuts are sold.

== Historical background ==
Prince Akinere, a renowned elephant hunter founded the Ikire township.

== Geographical feature ==
The study area, Ìkirè town is located in Irewole Local Government Area (LGA) of Osun state, Southwestern Nigeria. It is located 33.42 km or 20.72 miles off Ibadan– ife expressway road. Ikire town is located between Latitude Coordinates: 7°25′N 4°13′E. It has a fine climate that enhances the cultivation of arable and cash crops, which contributes to the economic development of the area. In addition, the vegetation cover of the Irewole Local Government Area is typically evergreen rainforest that is normally luxuriant during the raining season. This has aided the rearing of cattle and other domestic animals.

== Education ==
Senior high schools:

- Ayedaade Government High School
- Baptist Grammar School, Oke-Ako, Ikire
- Fatima College, Ikire
- St Augustine, Sanngo, Ikire
- Anwarul Islam grammar school, Oke Moro
- Community high school, Oke Ada
- Community high school, Wasinmi-Ikire
- Akinrere High school
- Unity school, Ikire
- St John's grammar school
- Ansarudeen grammar school, Atile
- Ikire Muslim grammar school, Molaagbo
- Islamic high school, Ilupeju
- College of Humanities and Culture, Osun State University, Ikire Campus
