= Ejigbo =

- Town
- Interactive map of Ejigbo
- Location within Nigeria
- Coordinates: 7°54′0″N 4°18′54″E
- Country: Nigeria
- State: Osun State

Government
  - Local Government Chairman and the Head of the Local Government Council: Prince Gbolahan Muyiwa Ayegbayo

Area
  - Total: 373 km^{2} (144 sq mi)
- Elevation: 426 m (1,398 ft)

Population (2006 Census)
  - Total: 132,641
  - Density: 356/km^{2} (921/sq mi)
- Time zone: UTC+1 (WAT)
- 3-digit postal code prefix: 232
- ISO 3166 code: NG.OS.EJ

Ejigbo is a Nigerian city situated in the central region of Osun State. It is the capital of Ejigbo Local Government Area. It covers 35 kilometres (22 mi) north-east of Iwo, 30 km (19 mi) from Ogbomoso in the north and 24 km (15 mi) from Ede in the south-east. It is about 40 km (25 mi) north-west of Osogbo, and about 95 km (59 mi) north-east of Ibadan. It is part of the Ede North/Ede South/Egbedore/Ejigbo federal constituency. The population is 138,357 according to the GeoNames geographical database. The average elevation is 426 metres (1,398 ft).

It has an area of 373 square kilometres (144 sq mi) and had a population of 132,641 at the 2006 census. The average annual rainfall is 1,330 millimetres (52.35 in), though there are great deviations from this mean value from year to year. Usually, the rainy season lasts from April to October.

The postal code of the area is 232.

== History ==
Akinjole Ogiyan Abidoye, legendary founder of Ejigbo

Ejigbo is a major Yoruba city in Osun State of Nigeria. It is about 40 kilometres (25 mi) to Oshogbo, the capital of Osun State.

According to oral history, Ejigbo is an ancient settlement. It was founded by Akinjole Ogiyan (abbreviation of "Ogiriniyan"), right after the old Oyo. Ogiyan has a rich pedigree, as a descendant of Oduduwa and the ruling family of Ile-Ife. Together with his brothers, particularly the Akire, the founder of Ikire-Ile, left Ile Ife with Oranyan (Oranmiyan) – the founder of old Oyo, to establish their own town. The fact that the Ogiyan is from Ile-Ife, is confirmed by "Ejigbo Mekun" the name of a market in Ile-Ife. Akinjole settled many other villages spread around Yorubaland. He was the paramount ruler and prescribed authority over many if not all of them. The following towns and villages, among others, were under him: Ika, Igbon, Olosinmo, Ologede, Inisa, Aato, Ijimoba, Afake, Ilawo, Inisa Edoro, Isundunrin, Olla, Ado Ori-Oke, Ayegunle, Idigba, Ibogunde, Songbe, Olorin, Osuntedo and Iwata.

Around 1835, Ejigbo came under Ibadan, when the Ibadan army moved to protect Osogbo from Ilorin invaders. In fact, detachments from Ejigbo assisted the Ibadan army in the Osogbo, Ijaye, Jalumi, Offa, and Kiriji wars between 1840 and 1866. Ajayi Ogboriefon, Balogun and leader of the Ibadan army in the Jalumi war circa 1860 and 1878 was native of Ejigbo from the Akala compound. His mother, Alagbabi, was the daughter of an Ogiyan of Ejigbo. In 1934, when the then government returned to the terms of the 1893 Treaty, which recognized Ibadan's independence and gazettes of the Baale and Divisional Council of Ibadan as an Independent Native Authority, five district obas, including the Ogiyan, were made members of the divisional Council.

The Ogiyan of Ejigbo, the town's paramount ruler, is central to upholding the community's vibrant cultural traditions. This traditional leader also plays a vital role in nurturing Ejigbo's extensive ties across both English and French-speaking West African nations, particularly due to the town's significant diaspora.The Ogiyan and council were also gazetted as subordinated to Native Authority under Ibadan for Ejigbo District Council. Although changes were made enlarging the membership of the Council between 1937 and 1938, the five districts Obas that included the Ogiyan retained their membership of the said Divisional Native Authority.

== Ejigbo South and Ejigbo West LCDAs ==
Ejigbo South Local Council Development Area and Ejigbo West Local Council Development Areas (LCDAs) were created out of Ejigbo area council for administrative convenience, better development planning and to bring government closer to the grassroot. The LCDA is created by the Government of Osun State and is responsible for the funding of the council. The LCDA is headed by a chairman, vice chairman and other executive and legislative branches similar to the federally recognized local councils. The current chairmen for the two LCDAs are Yusuf Bashir Akintegbe (Ejigbo South LCDA) and Olayanju Kolapo (Ejigbo West LCDA).

== Ejigbo people ==
=== Travelling ===
Ejigbo indigenes are well traveled. They have long history of international emigration, predominantly Ivory Coast, i.e.Côte d'Ivoire and have created border-less ECOWAS. The first Ejigbo migrants headed to Cote d'Ivoire in 1902, settling into Treichville, a suburb of Abidjan. Treichville was named after Marcel Treich-Laplène, a Frenchman who explored Cote d'Ivoire and served as its first colonial administrator.Interestingly, these Ejigbo migrants didn't go straight to Cote d'Ivoire. They first put down roots in Benin, Togo, and Ghana before Cote d'Ivoire became a major trade center.Out of about a million and two hundred thousand Nigerians residing in Côte d'Ivoire since the 1900s till present, indigenes of the Ejigbo local government area made up of more than 50% of that population. This has been drastically affecting the population of Ejigbo city, Nigeria, due to continuous migration of her people to some neighbouring West African countries, notably: Benin Republic, Burkina Faso, Côte d'Ivoire, Ghana, Liberia, Niger Republic, and Togo. The international exposure of Ejigbo people is evident in Ejigbo city.

Wherever Ejigbo people are found, they live a communal lifestyle. This is done in order to maintain the unity and cordial relationship they enjoy before travelling out of the country. They are believed to be so established and organized in each big city and town in which they find themselves. For example, in Côte d'Ivoire, the Ejigbo people have a community leader they refer to as "Oba" of that area, such as 'Oba Bouake', 'Oba Abobo', 'Oba Dabou', 'Oba Grand Bassam', 'Oba Treichville' (etc.), while the 'Oba' who resides in Adjame, suburb of Abidjan, is called the "Oba Abidjan". He is regarded as the paramount Ejigbo community leader of Côte d'Ivoire. These ‘Oba’ performs an intermediary role between the government and his subjects. He is deemed to be the custodian of the migrants who fall within their jurisdiction. The 'Obas' also help new migrant, once they could speak a native language, to process the Ivorian permanent residence permit (card identete). All those so-designated Ejigbo community leaders are all recognized back at home by HRM, the Ogiyan of Ejigbo.

=== Languages ===
Apart from Ejigbo peoples' mother tongue (Yoruba language) and Nigeria's official language (English), some of the other foreign languages spoken today in Ejigbo include: French (second to Yoruba), Dioula (Mali), Ewe (Togo), and Asante Twi (Ghana). In Ejigbo today, along the street, few people are said to actually speak English. They speak and transact in French instead, because as itinerant travellers, many natives have developed strong relationships with the Francophone world. The Ejigbo people are found in both West African and European Francophone cities.

== Cultural heritage ==
Cultural drum at Ejigbo Palace.

=== Ogiyan Festival ===
The festival of Orisa Ogiyan is still the most spectacular annual event in the city. During the festival, the Ogiyan, the ruler of the city is confined to his home for three months. The Orisa Ogiyan festival is held at the beginning of the harvest of new yams, usually in the rainy season. The Orisa is fed with new yam and epo pupa (palm oil). An important aspect of the festival is Ewo, the practice in which the people of the city divide themselves into two groups: the Isale Osolo and the Oke Mapo. They face each other in daylong whipping fights, as though in real battle.

The origin of this tradition centers on a medicine-man, or an Ifa Priest, who, in Owonri Elejigbo and Ifa divination verse, is known as "Sawoleje". The man helped the town in time of crisis. He was caught sleeping with the wife of an Ogiyan, and was severely beaten almost to death. He then cursed the town's people, saying that unless they regularly beat themselves as they had beaten him, the city would face some calamity. The tradition goes that there must be fights in every festival, otherwise, the city would not be at peace, and the health of its people would be endangered. Ejigbo in recent times, now remains one of the most peaceful of Yoruba towns; tradition says Ejigbo is never overtaken by war. The festival has now turned into an annual carnival.

== Farming ==
Poultry Keeping at Ogidiolu Farms, Ejigbo

Farming is the traditional source of economy in Ejigbo. It is based on production of food crops, such as tubers (yam, cassava, cocoyam, potato, etc.), grains (maize, guinea corn), and cowpea; cash crops like cocoa, palm oil, kola-nut, coconut and varieties of fruits which include large production of pineapple.

In the ancient times, the women helped in harvesting and selling of farm produce in the local markets. In some cases, such as palm oil, they engage in processing by extracting oil and the kernels from their shells. The land on which they farm is tropical dry forest and savanna, which has not been very much useful in the cultivation of cash crops, like cocoa and others in large quantities, as compared to other forested parts of Yoruba land. Kolanut is grown, but not in any large quantity. The farmlands are not very far from the town; therefore the people have always been urban dwellers.

Modernization has taken farming activities in Ejigbo to a world level. There are large poultry, fisheries and animal husbandry farms (Ogidiolu Farms, Worgor Farms, etc.) in Ejigbo. In 2008, Ejigbo was ranked highest producer of life cat fish in Osun State. Mechanized palm-oil processing plants has taken the place of the manual methods, and land cultivation has been greatly improved.

== Climate ==
The climate in Ejigbo is classified as a tropical savannah. All year long, the average temperature between 24 °C (76 °F) and 29 °C (85 °F). January, February, and December are the driest months in Ejigbo Town. These months see an average of 7 mm (0.3 inches) of precipitation, the wet season is between the month of March and October of the year.

== Economic activities ==
The central traditional market, popularly known as "Oja Ejigbo", is located at the center of the city, in the front of palace. The market is fixed for every Saturday(occasionally on thursday), as is the case in many Yoruba towns, and attracts merchants from all over Ejigbo city. There are also a handful of other such markets. Due to the commercial/agrarian nature of the town, the market is also the most favored for night shopping and other social activities. In the past, it was used as recreational center for the town, and therefore was attended by many who even had nothing to buy or sell.

More so, modern commercial banks and micro-finance banks have become available in the town.

Ejigbo's strong ties to Côte d'Ivoire have led to the widespread acceptance of the CFA Franc in its local markets. Residents often return from Côte d'Ivoire with goods and money, making the CFA Franc a convenient currency for daily transactions. As a result, market vendors in Ejigbo readily accept both CFA and Naira, offering flexibility for everyone. Currently, 1,000 CFA exchanges for about 2,850 Naira, a notable change from when one Naira was worth three CFA during former President Goodluck Jonathan's time.

Beyond currency, Côte d'Ivoire significantly influences Ejigbo's culture, from food to lifestyle. Traditional Ivorian meals are now common, and many market goods are imported directly from Côte d'Ivoire. This strong cultural and economic bond allows Ejigbo residents to experience the best of both worlds.

== Religion activities ==
Ejigbo did not escape the influence, especially in the nineteenth century, of events that permeated Nigeria. Its people and culture change with the flow. For example, many people have been converted to Christianity and Islam. The Baptist, being the dominant Christian mission in the town, now has a number of churches, and it was through its efforts that the people of the town established the first full-fledged secondary Grammar School, the Ejigbo Baptist High School, followed by the Ansar Ud Deen Grammar School. Ejigbo is tolerant of its diverse faiths. This is demonstrated in the joint celebration of the annual Orisa Ogiyan festival and other inter-religious and inter-denominational programs.

== Educational facilities ==
The readily available and affordable educational facilities have placed Ejigbo and her inhabitants among the well-educated in the country. Education is a cornerstone of community development in Ejigbo. All levels of Nigerian educational facilities have been available in Ejigbo. These have ranged from well-equipped kindergartens, nursery schools, primary schools, secondary schools, grammar schools, tertiary institutions and, as well as vocational training centers aimed at equipping residents with skills for the job market. Osun State University College of Agriculture is located at Ejigbo. A lot of other tertiary institutions in the southwest operate distance learning centers at Ejigbo.
