= Irewole =

- LGA
- Interactive map of Irewole
- Location in Nigeria
- Coordinates: 7°25′N 4°13′E
- Country: Nigeria
- State: Osun State
- Headquarter: Ikire

Government
  - Local Government Chairman and the Head of the Local Government Council: Okunola Jumoke Esther

Area
  - Total: 271 km^{2} (105 sq mi)

Population (2006 census)
  - Total: 143,599
  - Density: 530/km^{2} (1,370/sq mi)
- Time zone: UTC+1 (WAT)
- 3-digit postal code prefix: 221
- ISO 3166 code: NG.OS.IR

Irewole is a Local Government Area in Osun State, Nigeria. Its headquarters are in the town of Ikire in the south of the area at7°21′40″N 4°11′00″E. The current chairman of the council is Okunola Jumoke Esther.

It has an area of 271 km^{2} (105 mi^{2}; 67,000 acres) and a population of 143,599 at the 2006 census.

The postal code of the area is 221.

== Irewole North East Local Council Development Area (LCDA) ==
Irewole North East Local Council Development Area (LCDA) was created out of Irewole for administrative convenience, better development planning and to bring government closer to the grassroot. The LCDA was created by the Government of Osun State and is responsible for the funding of the council. The LCDA is headed by a chairman, vice chairman and other executive and legislative branches similar to the federally recognized local councils. The current chairman of the LCDA is Adeboye Opeyemi Tajudeen.

== Education ==
- Islamic middle school
- Ayedaade Government High School - Ikire
