= Egbedore =

- LGA
- Interactive map of Egbedore
- Location in Nigeria
- Coordinates: 7°49′N 4°26′E
- Country: Nigeria
- State: Osun State
- Headquarter: Awo
- LGA Secretary: Hon. Kazeem Balogun

Government
  - Local Government Chairman and the Head of the Local Government Council: Akinwale Hissa Olaniyi

Area
  - Total: 270 km^{2} (100 sq mi)

Population (2006 census)
  - Total: 74,435
  - Density: 280/km^{2} (710/sq mi)
- Time zone: UTC+1 (WAT)
- 3-digit postal code prefix: 232
- ISO 3166 code: NG.OS.EG

Egbedore is a Local Government Area in Osun State, Nigeria. Its headquarters are in the town of Awo at 7°46′00″N 4°24′00″E. Akinwale Hissa Olaniyi is the current chairman of the council.

It has an area of 270 km^{2} and a population of 74,435 at the 2006 census.

The postal code of the area is 232.

== Egbedore South LCDA and Egbedore Area Council ==
Egbedore South Local Council Development Area (LCDA) and Egbedore Area Council were created out of Egbedore for administrative convenience, better development planning and to bring government closer to the grassroot. The LCDA is created by the Government of Osun State and is responsible for the funding of the council. The LCDA is headed by a chairman, vice chairman and other executive and legislative branches similar to the federally recognized local councils. Fawande Oyewole is the current chairman of Egbedore South LCDA and the chairman of Egbedore Area Council is Usamat Azeez Ademola.
