= 2023 Nigerian presidential election in Osun State =

- 25 February 2023
- Registered: 1,954,800
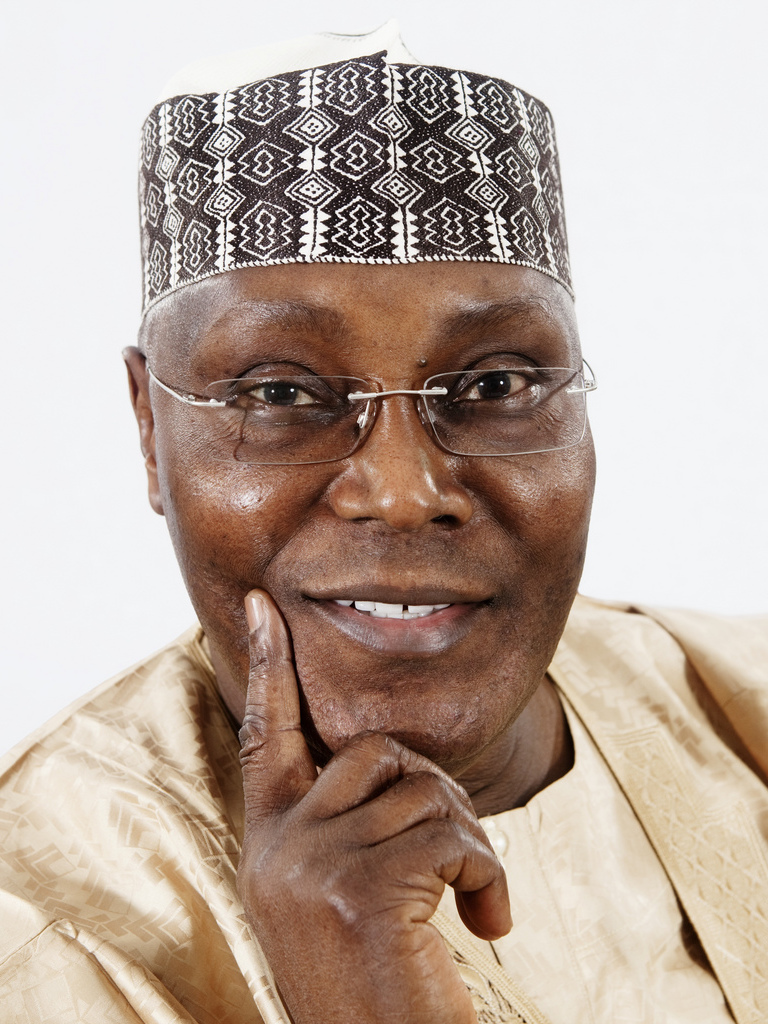

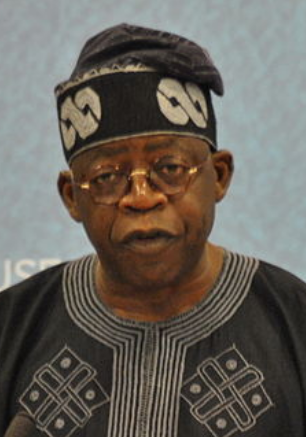

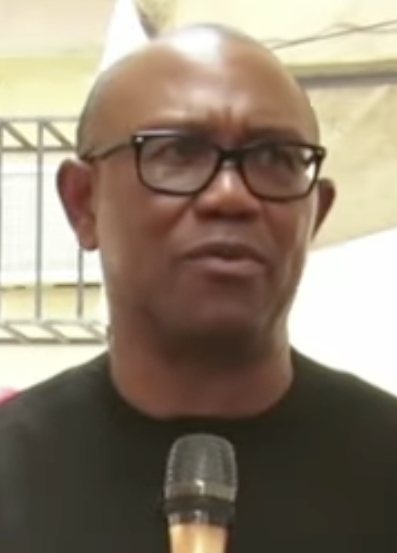
Nominee	Atiku Abubakar	Bola Tinubu
Party	PDP	APC
Home state	Adamawa	Lagos
Running mate	Ifeanyi Okowa	Kashim Shettima
Popular vote	354,366	343,945
Percentage	48.33%	46.91%
Nominee	Peter Obi	Rabiu Kwankwaso
Party	LP	New Nigeria Peoples Party
Home state	Anambra	Kano
Running mate	Yusuf Datti Baba-Ahmed	Isaac Idahosa
Popular vote	23,283	713
Percentage	3.17%	0.10%
President before election
Muhammadu Buhari
APC
Elected President
TBD

The 2023 Nigerian presidential election in Osun State was held on 25 February 2023 as part of the nationwide 2023 Nigerian presidential election to elect the president and vice president of Nigeria. Other federal elections, including elections to the House of Representatives and the Senate, were also held on the same date while state elections were held two weeks afterward on 11 March.

== Background ==
Osun State is a small, Yoruba-majority southwestern state with vast natural areas and rich cultural heritage but facing an underdeveloped agricultural sector and high debt. The state's 2019 elections were competitiveness with presidential incumbent Muhammadu Buhari barely winning the state and all three Senate races being fairly close. Of the Senate elections, two seats went to the APC and one went to the PDP while the House of Representatives elections went 6 APC and 3 PDP. Contrastly, the APC won a large majority in the State House of Assembly. Two years later, Ademola Adeleke (PDP) unseated Gboyega Oyetola (APC)—the incumbent Governor, winning by 3.5% of the vote; however, the election result was overturned by the tribunal and the court dispute continues as of January 2023.

== Polling ==
Polling organisation/client	Fieldwork date	Sample size					Others	Undecided	Undisclosed	Not voting
Polling organisation/client	Fieldwork date	Sample size	Tinubu APC	Obi LP	Kwankwaso NNPP	Abubakar PDP	Others	Undecided	Undisclosed	Not voting
BantuPage	January 2023	N/A	18%	8%	0%	21%	–	40%	4%	10%
Nextier (Osun crosstabs of national poll)	27 January 2023	N/A	17.6%	19.1%	–	76%	2.9%	–	–	–
SBM Intelligence for EiE (Osun crosstabs of national poll)	22 January-6 February 2023	N/A	2%	7%	–	1%	–	89%	–	–

== Projections ==
Source	Projection		As of
Africa Elects (Note: Africa Elects projections predict the likelihood of a candidate winning a state by categorizing a state as "Safe" for exceedingly likely, "Likely" for somewhat likely, and "Lean" for least likely. If no clear determination could be made, states are categorized as "tossups".)	Likely Tinubu		24 February 2023
Dataphyte (Note: Dataphyte projections predict candidates' projected votal shares in each state.)
Dataphyte	Tinubu:	38.27%	11 February 2023
Dataphyte	Obi:	19.99%	11 February 2023
Dataphyte	Abubakar:	25.18%	11 February 2023
Dataphyte	Others:	16.56%	11 February 2023
Enough is Enough- SBM Intelligence (Note: EiE-SBM projections predict which candidates will win states.)	Tinubu		17 February 2023
SBM Intelligence (Note: SBM projections predict which candidates will win states or, if no determination could be made, categorizes states as "Too close to call" (TCC).)	Abubakar		15 December 2022
ThisDay (Note: ThisDay projections predict candidates' projected votal shares in each state.)
ThisDay	Tinubu:	35%	27 December 2022
ThisDay	Obi:	5%	27 December 2022
ThisDay	Kwankwaso:	5%	27 December 2022
ThisDay	Abubakar:	35%	27 December 2022
ThisDay	Others/Undecided:	20%	27 December 2022
The Nation (Note: The Nation projections predict which candidates will win states or, if no determination could be made, categorizes states as "Battlegrounds.")	Tinubu		12-19 February 2023

== General election ==
=== Results ===
2023 Nigerian presidential election in Osun State
Party	Candidate	Votes	%
A	Christopher Imumolen		
AA	Hamza al-Mustapha		
ADP	Yabagi Sani		
APP	Osita Nnadi		
AAC	Omoyele Sowore		
ADC	Dumebi Kachikwu		
APC	Bola Tinubu		
APGA	Peter Umeadi		
APM	Princess Chichi Ojei		
BP	Sunday Adenuga		
LP	Peter Obi		
NRM	Felix Johnson Osakwe		
New Nigeria Peoples Party	Rabiu Kwankwaso		
PRP	Kola Abiola		
PDP	Atiku Abubakar		
SDP	Adewole Adebayo		
YPP	Malik Ado-Ibrahim		
ZLP	Dan Nwanyanwu		
Total votes			100.00%
Invalid or blank votes			N/A
Turnout			

==== By senatorial district ====
The results of the election by senatorial district.

Senatorial District	Bola Tinubu APC		Atiku Abubakar PDP		Peter Obi LP		Rabiu Kwankwaso NNPP		Others		Total valid votes
Senatorial District	Votes	%	Votes	%	Votes	%	Votes	%	Votes	%	Total valid votes
Osun Central Senatorial District (Note: Comprising the local government areas of Boluwaduro, Boripe, Ifedayo, Ifelodun, Ila, Irepodun, Odo Otin, Olorunda, Orolu, and Osogbo.)	TBD	%	TBD	%	TBD	%	TBD	%	TBD	%	TBD
Osun East Senatorial District (Note: Comprising the local government areas of Atakunmosa East, Atakunmosa West, Ife Central, Ife East, Ife North, Ife South, Ilesa East, Ilesa West, Obokun, and Oriade.)	TBD	%	TBD	%	TBD	%	TBD	%	TBD	%	TBD
Osun West Senatorial District (Note: Comprising the local government areas of Aiyedaade, Aiyedire, Ede North, Ede South, Egbedore, Ejigbo, Irewole, Isokan, Iwo, and Ola-Oluwa.)	TBD	%	TBD	%	TBD	%	TBD	%	TBD	%	TBD
Totals	TBD	%	TBD	%	TBD	%	TBD	%	TBD	%	TBD

==== By federal constituency ====
The results of the election by federal constituency.

Federal Constituency	Bola Tinubu APC		Atiku Abubakar PDP		Peter Obi LP		Rabiu Kwankwaso NNPP		Others		Total valid votes
Federal Constituency	Votes	%	Votes	%	Votes	%	Votes	%	Votes	%	Total valid votes
Atakunmosa East/Atakunmosa West/ Ilesa East/Ilesa West Federal Constituency (Note: Comprising the local government areas of Atakunmosa East, Atakunmosa West, Ilesa East, and Ilesa West.)	TBD	%	TBD	%	TBD	%	TBD	%	TBD	%	TBD
Ayedaade/Isokan/Irewole Federal Constituency (Note: Comprising the local government areas of Aiyedaade, Irewole, and Isokan.)	TBD	%	TBD	%	TBD	%	TBD	%	TBD	%	TBD
Aiyedire/Iwo/Ola-Oluwa Federal Constituency (Note: Comprising the local government areas of Aiyedire, Iwo, and Ola Oluwa.)	TBD	%	TBD	%	TBD	%	TBD	%	TBD	%	TBD
Boluwaduro/Ifedayo/Ila Federal Constituency (Note: Comprising the local government areas of Boluwaduro, Ifedayo, and Ila.)	TBD	%	TBD	%	TBD	%	TBD	%	TBD	%	TBD
Ede North/Ede South/Egbedore/Ejigbo Federal Constituency (Note: Comprising the local government areas of Ede North, Ede South, Egbedore, and Ejigbo.)	TBD	%	TBD	%	TBD	%	TBD	%	TBD	%	TBD
Ife Central/Ife East/Ife North/Ife South Federal Constituency (Note: Comprising the local government areas of Ife Central, Ife East, Ife North, and Ife South.)	TBD	%	TBD	%	TBD	%	TBD	%	TBD	%	TBD
Irepodun/Olorunda/Osogbo/Orolu Federal Constituency (Note: Comprising the local government areas of Irepodun, Osun, Olorunda, Orolu, and Osogbo.)	TBD	%	TBD	%	TBD	%	TBD	%	TBD	%	TBD
Obokun/Oriade Federal Constituency (Note: Comprising the local government areas of Obokun and Oriade.)	TBD	%	TBD	%	TBD	%	TBD	%	TBD	%	TBD
Odo-Otin/Boripe/Ifelodun Federal Constituency (Note: Comprising the local government areas of Boripe, Ifelodun, and Odo Otin.)	TBD	%	TBD	%	TBD	%	TBD	%	TBD	%	TBD
Totals	TBD	%	TBD	%	TBD	%	TBD	%	TBD	%	TBD

==== By local government area ====
The results of the election by local government area.

Local government area	Bola Tinubu APC		Atiku Abubakar PDP		Peter Obi LP		Rabiu Kwankwaso NNPP		Others		Total valid votes	Turnout (%)
Local government area	Votes	%	Votes	%	Votes	%	Votes	%	Votes	%	Total valid votes	Turnout (%)
Aiyedaade	TBD	%	TBD	%	TBD	%	TBD	%	TBD	%	TBD	%
Aiyedire	TBD	%	TBD	%	TBD	%	TBD	%	TBD	%	TBD	%
Atakunmosa East	TBD	%	TBD	%	TBD	%	TBD	%	TBD	%	TBD	%
Atakunmosa West	TBD	%	TBD	%	TBD	%	TBD	%	TBD	%	TBD	%
Boluwaduro	TBD	%	TBD	%	TBD	%	TBD	%	TBD	%	TBD	%
Boripe	TBD	%	TBD	%	TBD	%	TBD	%	TBD	%	TBD	%
Ede North	TBD	%	TBD	%	TBD	%	TBD	%	TBD	%	TBD	%
Ede South	TBD	%	TBD	%	TBD	%	TBD	%	TBD	%	TBD	%
Egbedore	TBD	%	TBD	%	TBD	%	TBD	%	TBD	%	TBD	%
Ejigbo	TBD	%	TBD	%	TBD	%	TBD	%	TBD	%	TBD	%
Ife Central	TBD	%	TBD	%	TBD	%	TBD	%	TBD	%	TBD	%
Ife East	TBD	%	TBD	%	TBD	%	TBD	%	TBD	%	TBD	%
Ife North	TBD	%	TBD	%	TBD	%	TBD	%	TBD	%	TBD	%
Ife South	TBD	%	TBD	%	TBD	%	TBD	%	TBD	%	TBD	%
Ifedayo	TBD	%	TBD	%	TBD	%	TBD	%	TBD	%	TBD	%
Ifelodun	TBD	%	TBD	%	TBD	%	TBD	%	TBD	%	TBD	%
Ila	TBD	%	TBD	%	TBD	%	TBD	%	TBD	%	TBD	%
Ilesa East	TBD	%	TBD	%	TBD	%	TBD	%	TBD	%	TBD	%
Ilesa West	TBD	%	TBD	%	TBD	%	TBD	%	TBD	%	TBD	%
Irepodun	TBD	%	TBD	%	TBD	%	TBD	%	TBD	%	TBD	%
Irewole	TBD	%	TBD	%	TBD	%	TBD	%	TBD	%	TBD	%
Isokan	TBD	%	TBD	%	TBD	%	TBD	%	TBD	%	TBD	%
Iwo	TBD	%	TBD	%	TBD	%	TBD	%	TBD	%	TBD	%
Obokun	TBD	%	TBD	%	TBD	%	TBD	%	TBD	%	TBD	%
Odo Otin	TBD	%	TBD	%	TBD	%	TBD	%	TBD	%	TBD	%
Ola Oluwa	TBD	%	TBD	%	TBD	%	TBD	%	TBD	%	TBD	%
Olorunda	TBD	%	TBD	%	TBD	%	TBD	%	TBD	%	TBD	%
Oriade	TBD	%	TBD	%	TBD	%	TBD	%	TBD	%	TBD	%
Osogbo	TBD	%	TBD	%	TBD	%	TBD	%	TBD	%	TBD	%
Totals	TBD	%	TBD	%	TBD	%	TBD	%	TBD	%	TBD	%

== See also ==
- 2023 Osun State elections
- 2023 Nigerian presidential election
