= 2022 Osun State gubernatorial election =

2022 gubernatorial election in Osun State, Nigeria

- 16 July 2022
- Turnout: 42.16% (Note: While 42.16% of registered voters cast a vote—either validly or invalidly, three other metrics for calculating turnout can also be used: the percent of registered voters that were accredited to vote (42.37%), the percent of Permanent Voter Card-holding voters that were accredited to vote (54.48%), and the percent of Permanent Voter Card-holding voters that cast a vote—either validly or invalidly (54.21%).)
Nominee	Ademola Adeleke	Gboyega Oyetola
Party	PDP	APC
Running mate	Kola Adewusi	Benedict Gboyega Alabi
Popular vote	403,371	375,027
Percentage	50.14%	46.62%
- Results by local government area
Governor before election
Gboyega Oyetola
APC
Elected Governor
Ademola Adeleke
PDP

The 2022 Osun State gubernatorial election took place on 16 July 2022, to elect the governor of Osun State. Incumbent All Progressives Congress Governor Gboyega Oyetola was eligible for re-election but lost by a 3.5% margin to former Senator Ademola Adeleke—the nominee of the Peoples Democratic Party. Adeleke and his running mate, Kola Adewusi, were inaugurated on 27 November. However, the Election Petition Tribunal overturned the result on 27 January 2023, awarding the win to Oyetola; Adeleke immediately appealed the ruling and remains in office pending the results of further litigation.

The primaries, scheduled for between 16 February and 12 March, resulted in Oyetola winning the APC nomination for a second time, albeit amid outcry from his primary challengers. For the main opposition PDP, longtime internal disputes led to two parallel primaries being held as a faction nominated former senatorial candidate Dotun Babayemi while the faction recognized by the national PDP nominated former Senator for Osun West Ademola Adeleke, the party's 2018 nominee. As the Independent National Electoral Commission only observed the primary that nominated Adeleke, he was recognized as the legitimate PDP nominee.

The general election was noted by solid logistical organisation and mainly peaceful voting but was marred by reports of vote buying. By the early morning of 17 July, collation completed and the Independent National Electoral Commission declared Adeleke as the winner. In total, Adeleke won over 400,000 votes and 50% of the vote as runner-up Oyetola received around 375,000 votes and over 46% of the vote. Electoral analysis focused on the effect of the divisions within the state APC along with the election's national impact as the final election before the presidential election in 2023. Civil society and election observer groups concentrated on the vote-buying reports but commended the highly successful election administration by INEC which resulted in smooth voting, direct online transmission of results, and an early winner declaration. However, Oyetola rejected the results and filed a challenge at the electoral tribunal. In a separate court case, Oyetola's nomination was voided after a court ruled that the APC gubernatorial primary was illegally conducted; however, Oyetola won the appeal.

== Electoral system ==
The governor of Osun State is elected using a modified two-round system. To be elected in the first round, a candidate must receive the plurality of the vote and over 25% of the vote in at least two-thirds of state local government areas. If no candidate passes this threshold, a second round will be held between the top candidate and the next candidate to have received a plurality of votes in the highest number of local government areas.

== Background ==
Osun State is a small, Yoruba-majority southwestern state with vast natural areas and rich cultural heritage but facing an underdeveloped agricultural sector and high debt.

Politically, Oyetola's close 2018 victory was a forerunner of the state's competitiveness in the 2019 elections with presidential incumbent Muhammadu Buhari barely winning the state back and all three Senate races being fairly close. Of the Senate elections, two seats went to the APC and one went to the PDP while the House of Representatives elections went 6 APC and 3 PDP. Contrastly, the APC won a large majority in the State House of Assembly.

At the beginning of Oyetola's term, his promises included completing in-progress projects, full payment of civil servant salaries, and further developing his predecessor's welfare programs. In terms of his performance, Oyetola was commended for mining development but was criticized for declaring numerous public holidays and failing to pay pensions. Oyetola also came under pressure when the Pandora Papers revealed that he had bought a London mansion from an international fugitive wanted for money laundering using a British Virgin Islands-based offshore company as Nigerian authorities were attempting to freeze the fugitive's assets.

== Primary elections ==
The primaries, along with any potential challenges to primary results, were scheduled for between 16 February and 12 March. According to some candidates and community leaders, an informal zoning gentlemen's agreement should have set the Osun West Senatorial District to have the next governor as since the 1999 return of democracy, all Osun governors have come from either the Osun East or Osun Central Senatorial Districts. While the PDP ended up nominating Adelake, a westerner, Oyetola was renominated by the APC despite his Central origins.

=== All Progressives Congress ===
Although there were rumors of a rift between Governor Oyetola and former Governor Rauf Aregbesola that could lead to Oyetola failing to be renominated, Osun APC Chairman Gboyega Famodun claimed that Oyetola was widely accepted throughout the state and local APC chapters and thus would have the support of the state party. However, the Osun State APC later factionalized between the Oyetola-aligned IleriOluwa faction (chaired by Famodun) and the Aregbesola-aligned The Osun Progressives faction (chaired by Rasaq Salinsile). Despite outside attempts at reconciliation, the party crisis deepened by January 2022 and the threat of two parallel primaries loomed as Oyetola registered to run in the IleriOluwa APC while challengers registered to run in the TOP APC. Eventually, the IleriOluwa faction was recognized by the national APC and the primary continued within it as Aregbesola endorsed challenger Moshood Adeoti while Oyetola began his campaign for a second term.

In January 2022, the APC rescheduled its primary for 19 February with the expression of interest form costing ₦2.5 million and the nomination form costing ₦20 million; a 50% discount would be provided to women candidates and candidates with disabilities. The party also rescheduled its candidate screening and screening appeal process for 10 and 15 February, respectively. Different dates had been announced in November but the dates were changed after national revision.

In the days before the election, the Oyetola-Aregbesola feud escalated after Aregbesola formally endorsed Adeoti on 14 February. Aregbesola then claimed that his convoy was attacked later that day in an assassination attempt while the police and Oyetola administration claimed that Aregbesola's guards shot into the air without any provocation. The next day, Aregbesola allies claimed that they had uncovered a new plot to kill Aregbesola by "state government-sponsored political thugs," thus indirectly accusing Oyetola of organizing the assassination plots. These incidents lead to fears that the primary could be marred by violence despite the increased security presence during the exercise. Thankfully, the practice was mainly peaceful, albeit with one person being shot dead over a non-election related dispute according to police. In the early morning of 20 February, head of the primary committee and Kwara State Governor AbdulRahman AbdulRazaq declared Oyetola as the APC nominee after announced results showed him defeating Adeoti and former House Deputy Speaker Yusuf Sulaimon Lasun by over 200,000 votes with 60% turnout. Before the results were even announced, Adeoti and his allies rejected the primary wholeheartedly with his supporters claiming that their names were purposefully left off registers, others observing that INEC officials were absent from units, and Aregbesola calling the primary a "sham of an election." For their part, Oyetola supporters backed the exercise's fairness and Oyetola himself called for party unity the day after the primary. Prior to taking outside legal action, Adeoti appealed to the APC primary election appeal committee which denied his appeal; accordingly, Adeoti then asked a Federal High Court in Abuja to declare him winner. The case was not resolved until 14 July when Justice Inyang Eden Ekwo dismissed the lawsuit. However, a different case brought by the PDP contested that the primary was invalid due to illegitimate APC national leadership as then-APC Chair Mai Mala Buni was an incumbent governor; on 1 October 2022, a Federal High Court ruled in favor of the PDP, nullifying the APC gubernatorial primary and declaring Oyetola's nomination void. The APC announced that the party would appeal the ruling and on 3 December, a Court of Appeal judgment overturned the lower court's decision. On 2 February 2023, the Supreme Court upheld the Court of Appeal judgment by dismissing the PDP case.

==== Nominated ====
- Gboyega Oyetola: Governor, former Chief of Staff to the Governor, and relative of former Lagos State Governor Bola Tinubu
  - Running mate—Benedict Gboyega Alabi: Deputy Governor

==== Defeated in primary ====
- Moshood Adeoti: former Secretary to the State Government
- Yusuf Sulaimon Lasun: former House of Representatives member for Irepodun/Olurunda/Osogbo/Orolu, former Deputy Speaker of the House of Representatives, and 2018 APC gubernatorial candidate (defected after to the primary to successfully obtain the LP gubernatorial nomination)

==== Declined ====
- Najeem Salaam: former Speaker of the Osun State House of Assembly

==== Results ====
Candidates' vote share
1. Gboyega Oyetola (94.3%)
2. Moshood Adeoti (5.48%)
3. Yusuf Sulaimon Lasun (0.20%)

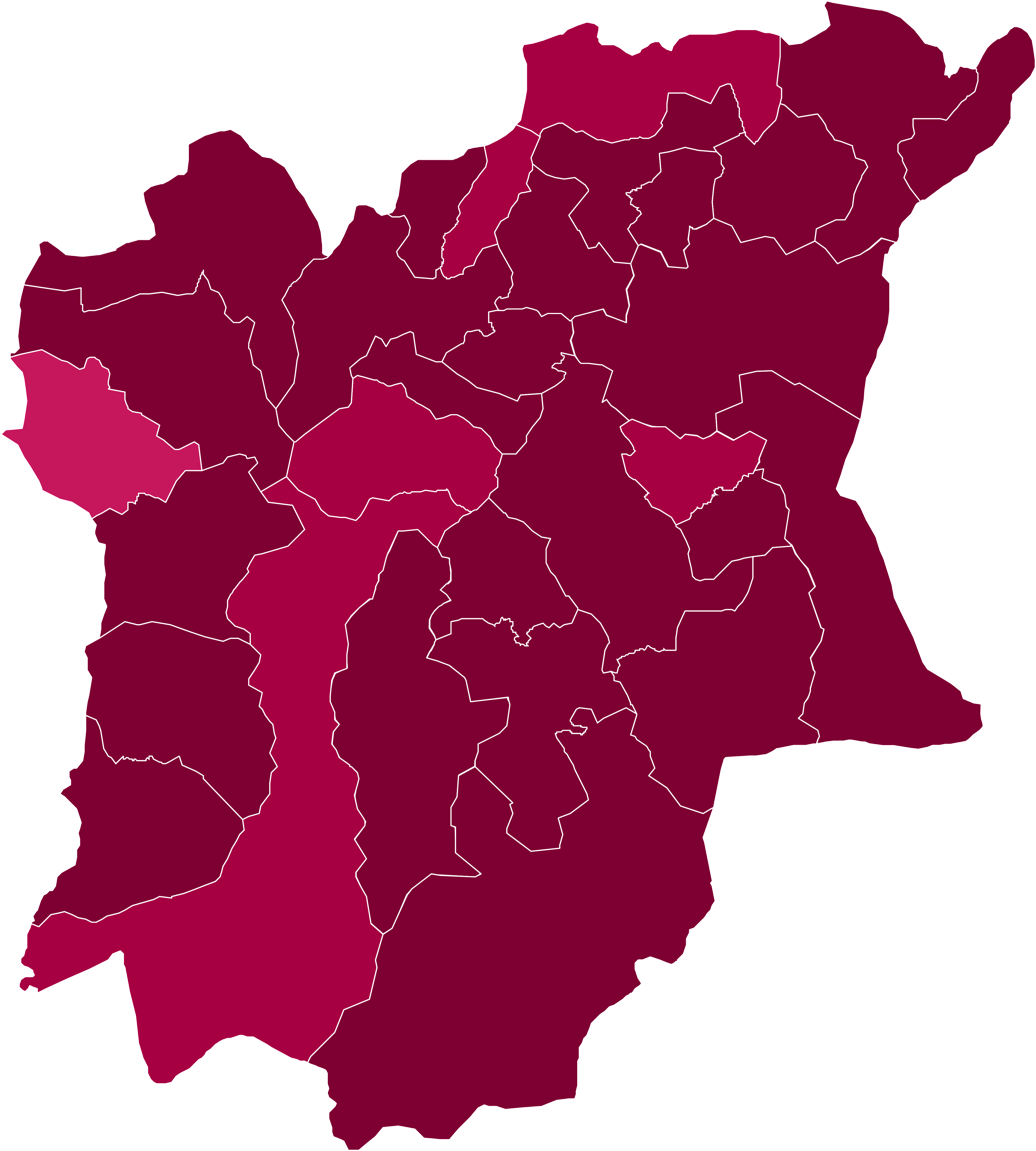
Results by LGA Oyetola: 70–80%; 80–90%; >90%

APC primary results
Party	Candidate	Votes	%
APC	Gboyega Oyetola	222,169	94.32%
APC	Moshood Adeoti	12,921	5.48%
APC	Yusuf Sulaimon Lasun	460	0.20%
Total votes		235,550	100.00
Turnout		247,207	58.77%

===== By local government area =====
LGA	Oyetola		Adeoti		Lasun		Total votes
LGA	#	%	#	%	#	%	#
Aiyedaade	3,615	87.00%	540	13.00%	0	0.00%	4,155
Aiyedire	3,274	92.07%	279	7.85%	3	0.08%	3,556
Atakunmosa East	2,637	94.04%	165	5.89%	2	0.07%	2,804
Atakunmosa West	4,655	93.72%	305	6.14%	7	0.14%	4,967
Boluwaduro	6,399	99.04%	62	0.96%	0	0.00%	6,461
Boripe	15,034	99.97%	5	0.03%	0	0.00%	15,039
Ede North	7,117	95.79%	311	4.21%	0	0.00%	7,430
Ede South	2,664	80.92%	628	19.08%	0	0.00%	3,292
Egbedore	5,500	92.91%	420	7.09%	0	0.00%	5,920
Ejigbo	8,007	95.70%	360	4.30%	0	0.00%	8,367
Ife Central	10,843	96.92%	344	3.07%	1	0.01%	11,188
Ife East	12,030	97.36%	326	2.64%	0	0.00%	12,356
Ife North	3,377	93.18%	242	6.68%	5	0.14%	3,624
Ife South	8,268	99.48%	43	0.52%	0	0.00%	8,311
Ifedayo	4,214	96.76%	141	3.24%	0	0.00%	4,355
Ifelodun	11,873	94.75%	631	5.03%	27	0.22%	12,531
Ila	8,834	99.47%	47	0.53%	0	0.00%	8,881
Ilesa East	4,857	90.94%	483	9.04%	1	0.02%	5341
Ilesa West	3,877	89.68%	446	10.32%	0	0.00%	4,323
Irepodun	7,928	89.34%	732	8.25%	214	2.41%	8,874
Irewole	7,560	93.37%	537	6.63%	0	0.00%	8,097
Isokan	6,468	95.68%	279	4.13%	13	0.19%	6,760
Iwo	9,432	78.76%	2,543	21.23%	1	0.01%	11,976
Obokun	5,245	90.84%	527	9.13%	2	0.03%	5,774
Odo Otin	7,035	86.65%	384	13.35%	0	0.00%	8,119
Ola Oluwa	3,771	91.22%	363	8.78%	0	0.00%	4,134
Olorunda	7,103	92.74%	555	7.25%	1	0.01%	7,659
Oriade	10,935	96.05%	438	3.85%	11	0.10%	11,384
Orolu	6,652	98.08%	130	1.92%	0	0.00%	6,782
Osogbo	22,265	96.43%	655	2.84%	170	0.74%	23,090
Totals	222,169	94.32%	12,921	5.48%	460	0.20%	235,550

=== People's Democratic Party ===
By 2021, Ademola Adeleke, the 2018 PDP nominee, had already received the support of the national PDP with party officials claiming he has effectively been given the nomination according to PDP Deputy National Publicity Secretary Duran Odeyemi. However, the state PDP claimed that while "the majority of our party stakeholders" were supporting Adeleke, all contenders were allowed to run in the primary. This assessment became contested as the state party later factionalized between the Adeleke-supporting faction (chaired by Sunday Bisi) and the faction aligned with the other five candidates (chaired by Wale Ojo). Another internal battle was sparked in January 2022 when a dispute between Ademola and Dele Adeleke—both members of the powerful Adeleke political family of Ede—escalated and tied in popular musician Davido, cousin of Dele and nephew of Ademola, who has supported Ademola since 2018 and attacked Dele on social media.

In November 2021, the PDP announced that its primary will be held on 7 March 2022 with the sale of the expression of interest and nomination forms being held between 22 November and 10 December. On 8 January, the PDP rescheduled its candidate screening from 11 January to 12 January with the screening appeal process remaining scheduled for 26 January; all six candidates were approved by the committee. The primary date was later pushed back to 8 March.

In the weeks ahead of the primaries, contentious ward congresses to elect delegates for the primary left two people dead and led to fear of continued violence between the Bisi and Ojo factions during the primary itself. The primary was shaping to primarily be a rematch of the 2018 primary between Ademola Adeleke and Akin Ogunbiyi until Ogunbiyi withdrew on 7 March citing alleged bias from the national party in favour of A. Adeleke; on the same day Sanya Omirin, Dele Adeleke, and Fatai Akinade Akinbade also dropped out leaving just Dotun Babayemi and A. Adeleke in the race. On the morning of the primary, two parallel primaries held with the Ojo-led faction holding a primary at the Women and Children Development Initiative Foundation (WOCDIF) Centre while the Bisi-led faction (backed by the national PDP) held its primary at the Osogbo City Stadium. After both primaries were peacefully held, the WOCDIF Centre primary ended in Babayemi winning by a wide margin while the Stadium primary resulted in a large win for Ademola Adeleke. The national party-appointed returning officer, Bayelsa Deputy Governor Lawrence Ewhrudjakpo, presided over the Stadium primary and dismissed the WOCDIF Centre primary as "invalid" while former Governor Olagunsoye Oyinlola backed the WOCDIF Centre primary. The PDP national headquarters gave Adeleke the certificate of return on 10 March but Babayemi stated that the decision was "not the end of journey." As the Independent National Electoral Commission only observed the primary that nominated Adeleke, he was listed as the legitimate PDP nominee in April before in May, a Federal High Court dismissed Babayemi's challenge to be declared nominee. In July, after the general election, Babayemi's appeal was also rejected as the Court of Appeal in Akure upheld the High Court ruling. He again appealed, but the Supreme Court upheld the rulings of the lower courts and sided with Adeleke in late September 2022.

==== Nominated ====
- Ademola Adeleke: former Senator for Osun West, 2018 PDP gubernatorial nominee, member of the Adeleke family, and uncle of opponent Dele Adeleke
  - Running mate—Kola Adewusi

==== Defeated in primary ====
- Dotun Babayemi: 2019 ADP Osun West senatorial nominee and son of former Olufi of Gbongan Solomon Oyewole Babayemi

==== Withdrew ====
- Dele Adeleke: accountant, member of the Adeleke family, and nephew of opponent Ademola Adeleke
- Fatai Akinade Akinbade: 2018 ADC gubernatorial nominee, former Secretary to the State Government, and former commissioner
- Sanya Omirin: former commissioner and former Atakunmosa East LG Chairman

==== Declined ====
- Ayoade Adewopo: 2018 PDP gubernatorial candidate
- Oluwole Oke: House of Representatives member for Oriade/Obokun
- Akinlabi Olasunkanmi: former Minister of Youth Development and 2018 PDP gubernatorial candidate

==== Results ====
Candidates' vote share
1. Ademola Adeleke (99.7%)
2. Other candidates (0.26%)

PDP Stadium primary results
Party	Candidate	Votes	%
PDP	Ademola Adeleke	1,887	99.74%
PDP	Sanya Omirin (withdrawn)	4	0.21%
PDP	Dele Adeleke (withdrawn)	1	0.05%
PDP	Fatai Akinade Akinbade (withdrawn)	0	0.00%
PDP	Dotun Babayemi	0	0.00%
PDP	Akin Ogunbiyi (withdrawn)	0	0.00%
Total votes		1,892	100.0

Invalid WOCDIF Centre primary results
Candidates' vote share
1. ~~Dotun Babayemi~~ (94.7%)
2. ~~Other candidates~~ (5.27%)

~~PDP WOCDIF Centre primary results~~
Party	Candidate	Votes	%
PDP	~~Dotun Babayemi~~	~~1,781~~	~~94.73%~~
PDP	~~Dele Adeleke (withdrawn)~~	~~32~~	~~1.70%~~
PDP	~~Fatai Akinade Akinbade (withdrawn)~~	~~28~~	~~1.49%~~
PDP	~~Akin Ogunbiyi (withdrawn)~~	~~23~~	~~1.22%~~
PDP	~~Sanya Omirin (withdrawn)~~	~~16~~	~~0.85%~~
PDP	~~Ademola Adeleke~~	~~0~~	~~0.00%~~
Total votes		~~1,880~~	~~100.0~~

=== Minor parties ===
==== Nominees ====
- Akin Ogunbiyi (Accord)
  - Running mate: Kunle Jimoh
- Peter Segun Awojide (African Action Congress)
  - Running mate: Gideon Fakiyesi
- Kehinde Munirudeen Atanda (Action Democratic Party)
  - Running mate: Claret Agbaje
- Awoyemi Oluwatayo Lukuman (Allied Peoples Movement)
  - Running mate: Akinloye Adesola
- Adebayo Adeolu Elisha (Action Peoples Party)
  - Running mate: Hezekiah Akinpelu
- Adeleke Adedapo (Boot Party)
  - Running mate: Lateef Adenike
- Yusuf Sulaimon Lasun (Labour Party)
  - Running mate: Adeola Atanda
- Rasaq Oyelami Saliu (New Nigeria Peoples Party)
  - Running mate: Olatunbosun Olusolape
- Samuel Adetona Abede (National Rescue Movement)
  - Running mate: Amoo Omolara
- Busuyi Ayowole (People's Redemption Party)
  - Running mate: Olowu Aiyedun
- Akinrinola Oyegoke Omigbodun (Social Democratic Party)
  - Running mate: Oni Adesoye
- Ademola Bayonle Adeseye (Young Progressives Party)
  - Running mate: Stella Adeagbo
- John Olufemi Adesuyi (Zenith Labour Party)
  - Running mate: Grace Kemi Fakolade

== Campaign ==
After the primaries confirmed that the general election would be a rematch of 2018 between Oyetola (APC) and Adeleke (PDP), analysts contended that the election would be shaped by what each camp had done since 2018 as the power struggle between the two continued. For both, the early parts of the general election campaign were dominated by attempts to address controversies around their respective primaries as the contentious primaries were identified as a key potential problem for their campaign. However, several of both nominees' intraparty opponents remained disgruntled leading one of Oyetola's primary challengers (Yusuf Sulaimon Lasun) to leave the APC entirely to run under the LP while one of Adeleke's primary opponents (Akin Ogunbiyi) defected to become Accord flagbearer. On the other hand, Adeleke and Babayemi settled their dispute in May as the national APC attempted to reconcile Oyetola and Aregbesola around the same time.

As campaigning escalated in May and June, the nominees' unveiled their policy agendas and brought in out-of-state politicians to hold rallies. However, for the PDP, the internal crisis surrounding the party's presidential primary led aggrieved politicians to avoid the Osun campaign trail. Analysts noted the similarities to the 2018 race during the campaign while continuing to focus on both state parties' attempts to reconcile their nominees with intraparty opposition. Policy also took centre stage in the fortnight before the election as debates were held; the first debate on 30 June was held by BBC Yoruba and had Adeleke attack Oyetola for bad roads and hospitals while Oyetola touted his administration's banking and security policies. In the second debate, conducted by Arise News on 6 July, Oyetola vowed to create jobs and voiced his support for state police but the debate was not attended by Adeleke. The final debate, jointly held by Channels TV and the Nigeria Civil Society Situation Room, was attended by both major contenders as Adeleke attacked Oyetola on security while Oyetola attempted to defend his record. The days right before the election were overshadowed by an armed attack on Lasun's home on 11 July; to combat fears of further electoral violence, 13 candidates signed a peace accord on 13 July at the behest of the National Peace Committee. Analysis directly before the election confirmed the competitiveness of the race while noting the election's numerous factors and its national implications as the final election before the next year's presidential election.

=== Election debates ===
2022 Osun State gubernatorial election debates
Date	Organisers	P Present (Note: Denotes a party gubernatorial nominee attending the event.) S Surrogate (Note: Denotes a party gubernatorial nominee not attending the event, sending a surrogate in their place.) NI Not invited A Absent invitee						
Date	Organisers	A	APC	LP	PDP	SDP	Other parties	Ref.
30 June	BBC Yoruba	P Ogunbiyi	P Oyetola	P Lasun	P Adeleke	P Omigbodun	NI; Multiple	
6 July	Arise News	P Ogunbiyi	P Oyetola	P Lasun	A Adeleke	P Omigbodun	NI; Multiple	
10 July	Channels TV-CSSR	P Ogunbiyi	P Oyetola	P Lasun	P Adeleke	P Omigbodun	NI; Multiple	

== Conduct ==
=== Electoral timetable ===
The Independent National Electoral Commission released the timetable, setting out key dates and deadlines for the election.

- 15 February 2022 – Publication of Notice of Election
- 16 February 2022 – First day for the conduct of party primaries
- 12 March 2022 – Final day for the conduct of party primaries, including the resolution of disputes arising from them
- 14 March 2022 – First day for submission of nomination forms to INEC via the online portal
- 18 March 2022 – Final day for submission of nomination forms to INEC via the online portal
- 17 April 2022 – Commencement of the official campaign period
- 14 July 2022 – Final day of the official campaign period
- 16 July 2022 – Election Day

=== Pre-election ===
As the election neared, INEC and other authorities started announcing their preparations with the election commission announcing that it would deploy both full-time and ad-hoc staffers to the state's 3,753 polling units on election day along with BVAS machines while noting that vote buying was a major concern in the wake of the Ekiti State gubernatorial election. For the Nigeria Police Force, a statement on 10 July noted that police would deploy Deputy Inspector-General Johnson Babatunde Kokumo to be coordinator of election security efforts that would include thousands of conventional police officers and soldiers along with special forces, five armored personnel carriers, three helicopters, and drones.

=== Election Day ===
On election day, voting was mainly peaceful and logistically well-organized but reports of vote buying from party agents marred the exercise. On the other hand, INEC was commended for successful election administration as the vast majority of polling units had early-arriving officials, security operatives, and well-functioning equipment according to preliminary reports from election observers CDD West Africa, Nigeria Civil Society Situation Room, and YIAGA Africa.

== General election ==
=== Results ===
Candidates' vote share
1. Ademola Adeleke (PDP) (50.1%)
2. Gboyega Oyetola (APC) (46.6%)
3. Other candidates (3.24%)

2022 Osun State gubernatorial election
Party	Candidate	Votes	%
PDP	Ademola Adeleke	403,371	50.14%
APC	Gboyega Oyetola	375,027	46.62%
ADP	Kehinde Munirudeen Atanda	10,104	1.26%
A	Akin Ogunbiyi	4,514	0.56%
LP	Yusuf Sulaimon Lasun	2,729	0.34%
AAC	Peter Segun Awojide	2,148	0.27%
YPP	Ademola Bayonle Adeseye	1,303	0.16%
APM	Awoyemi Oluwatayo Lukuman	1,222	0.15%
PRP	Busuyi Ayowole	1,007	0.13%
NRM	Samuel Adetona Abede	777	0.10%
APP	Adebayo Adeolu Elisha	601	0.07%
SDP	Akinrinola Oyegoke Omigbodun	515	0.06%
New Nigeria Peoples Party	Rasaq Oyelami Saliu	393	0.05%
BP	Adeleke Adedapo	374	0.05%
ZLP	John Olufemi Adesuyi	364	0.05%
Total votes		804,450	100.0%
Invalid or blank votes		18,674	N/A
Turnout		823,124	42.16%
PDP gain from APC			

==== By senatorial district ====
The results of the election by senatorial district.

Senatorial District		Oyetola APC		Adeleke PDP		Others		Total Valid Votes
District	Incumbent Senator	Votes	Percentage	Votes	Percentage	Votes	Percentage	Total Valid Votes
Osun Central Senatorial District (Note: Comprising the local government areas of Boluwaduro, Boripe, Ifedayo, Ifelodun, Ila, Irepodun, Odo Otin, Olorunda, Orolu, and Osogbo.)	Ajibola Basiru	136,294	47.99%	138,733	48.85%	8,964	3.16%	283,991
Osun East Senatorial District (Note: Comprising the local government areas of Atakunmosa East, Atakunmosa West, Ife Central, Ife East, Ife North, Ife South, Ilesa East, Ilesa West, Obokun, and Oriade.)	Fadahunsi Francis Adenigba	121,873	48.71%	120,080	47.99%	8,260	3.30%	250,213
Osun West Senatorial District (Note: Comprising the local government areas of Aiyedaade, Aiyedire, Ede North, Ede South, Egbedore, Ejigbo, Irewole, Isokan, Iwo, and Ola-Oluwa.)	Adelere Adeyemi Oriolowo	116,860	43.24%	144,558	53.49%	8,828	3.27%	270,246
Totals		375,027	46.62%	403,371	50.14%	26,052	3.24%	804,450

Percentage of the vote won by each major candidate by district.

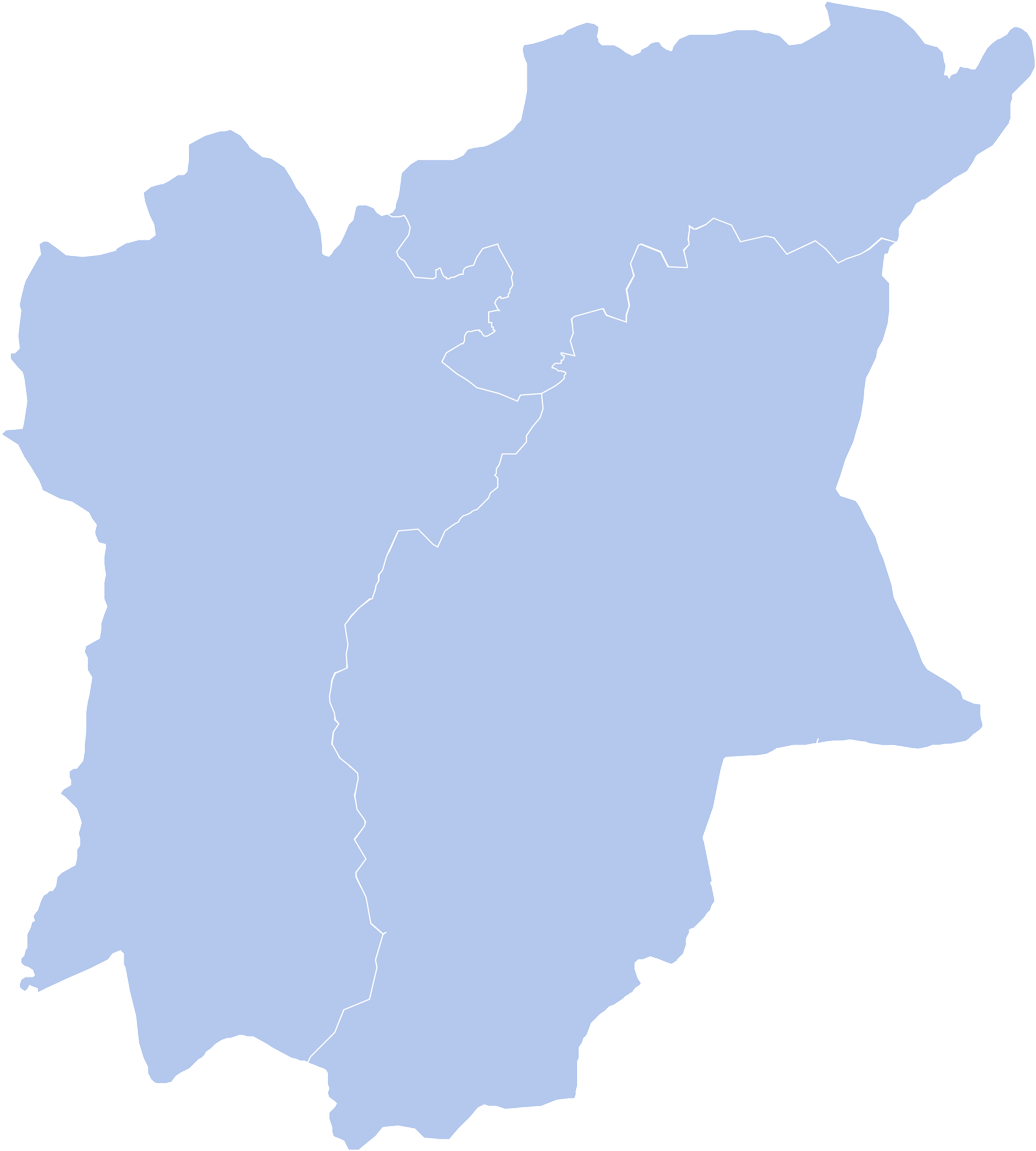
Oyetola; 40-50%

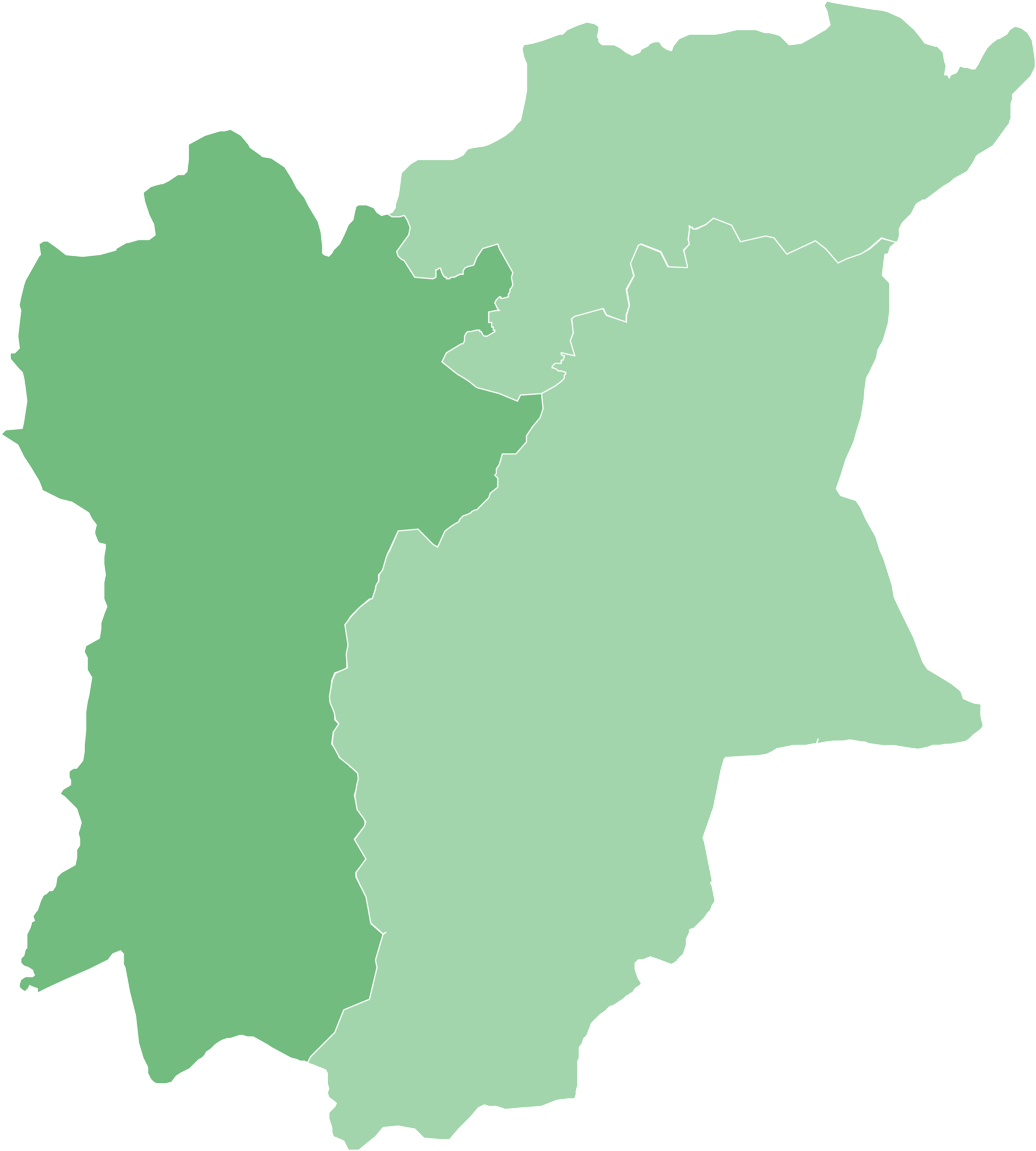
Adeleke; 40–50% 50–60%

==== By federal constituency ====
The results of the election by federal constituency.

Federal Constituency		Oyetola APC		Adeleke PDP		Others		Total Valid Votes
Constituency	Incumbent MHR	Votes	Percentage	Votes	Percentage	Votes	Percentage	Total Valid Votes
Atakunmosa East/Atakunmosa West/Ilesa East/Ilesa West Federal Constituency (Note: Comprising the local government areas of Atakunmosa East, Atakunmosa West, Ilesa East, and Ilesa West.)	Lawrence Babatunde Ayeni	38,279	47.60%	39,480	49.10%	2,655	3.30%	80,414
Ayedaade/Isokan/Irewole Federal Constituency (Note: Comprising the local government areas of Aiyedaade, Irewole, and Isokan.)	Taiwo Oluga	43,558	51.45%	38,373	45.33%	2,725	3.22%	84,656
Aiyedire/Iwo/Ola-Oluwa Federal Constituency (Note: Comprising the local government areas of Aiyedire, Iwo, and Ola Oluwa.)	Amobi Yinusa Akintola	34,412	49.60%	31,521	45.43%	3,452	4.98%	69,385
Boluwaduro/Ifedayo/Ila Federal Constituency (Note: Comprising the local government areas of Boluwaduro, Ifedayo, and Ila, Osun.)	Olufemi Fakeye	21,828	47.17%	23,626	51.05%	825	1.78%	46,279
Ede North/Ede South/Egbedore/Ejigbo Federal Constituency (Note: Comprising the local government areas of Ede North, Ede South, Egbedore, and Ejigbo.)	Bamidele Salam	38,890	33.47%	74,664	64.25%	2,651	2.28%	116,205
Ife Central/Ife East/Ife North/Ife South Federal Constituency (Note: Comprising the local government areas of Ife Central, Ife East, Ife North, and Ife South.)	Taofeek Abimbola Ajilesoro	59,678	51.87%	51,078	44.40%	4,289	3.73%	115,045
Irepodun/Olorunda/Osogbo/Orolu Federal Constituency (Note: Comprising the local government areas of Irepodun, Osun, Olorunda, Orolu, and Osogbo.)	Olubukola Oyewo	63,711	43.64%	76,402	52.34%	5,868	4.02%	145,981
Obokun/Oriade Federal Constituency (Note: Comprising the local government areas of Obokun and Oriade.)	Oluwole Oke	23,916	43.68%	29,522	53.92%	1,316	2.40%	54,754
Odo-Otin/Boripe/Ifelodun Federal Constituency (Note: Comprising the local government areas of Boripe, Ifelodun, and Odo Otin.)	Olalekan Rasheed Afolabi	50,755	55.33%	38,705	42.19%	2,271	2.48%	91,731
Totals		375,027	46.62%	403,371	50.14%	26,052	3.24%	804,450

Percentage of the vote won by each major candidate by constituency.

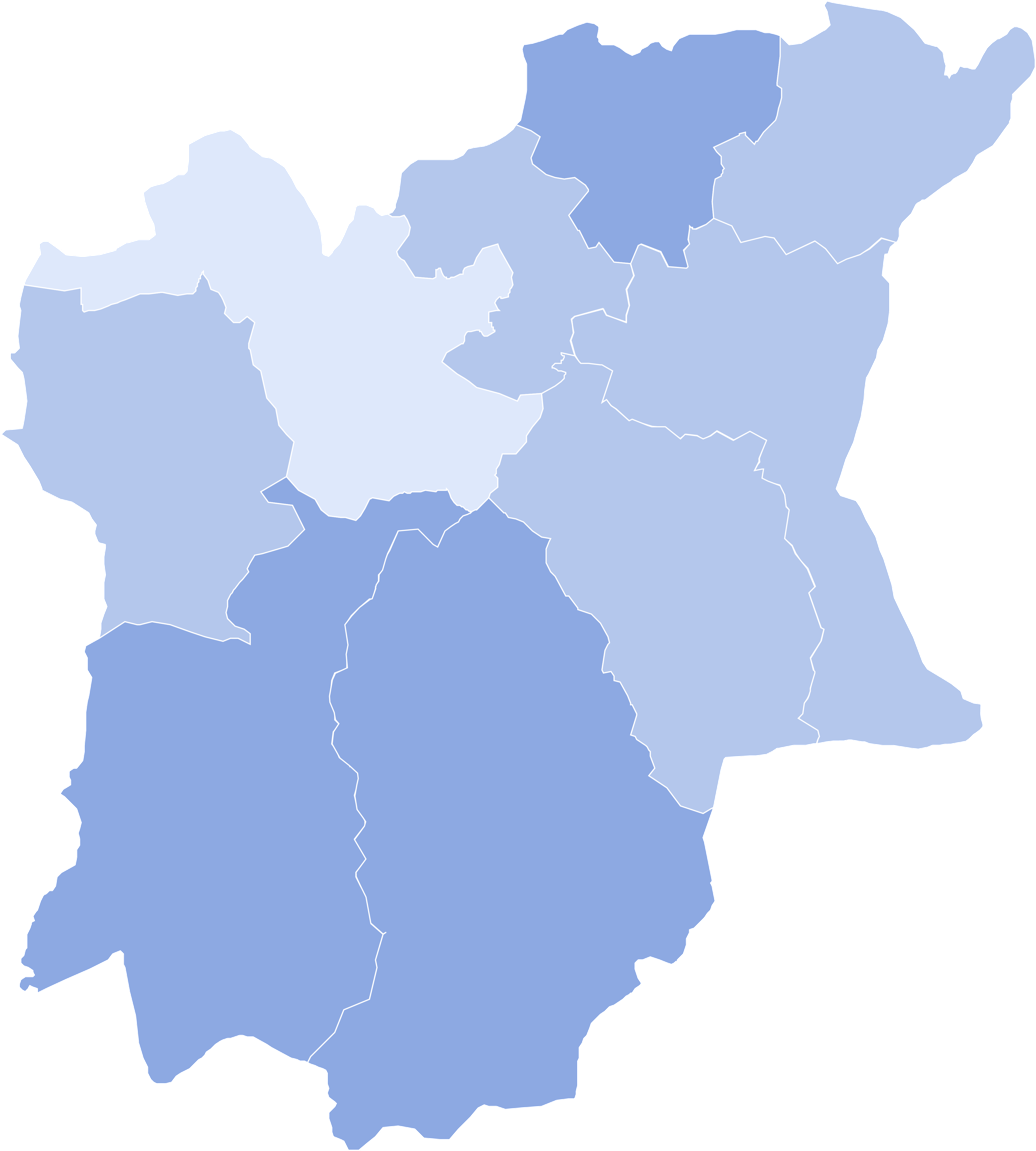
Oyetola; 30–40% 40-50% 50–60%

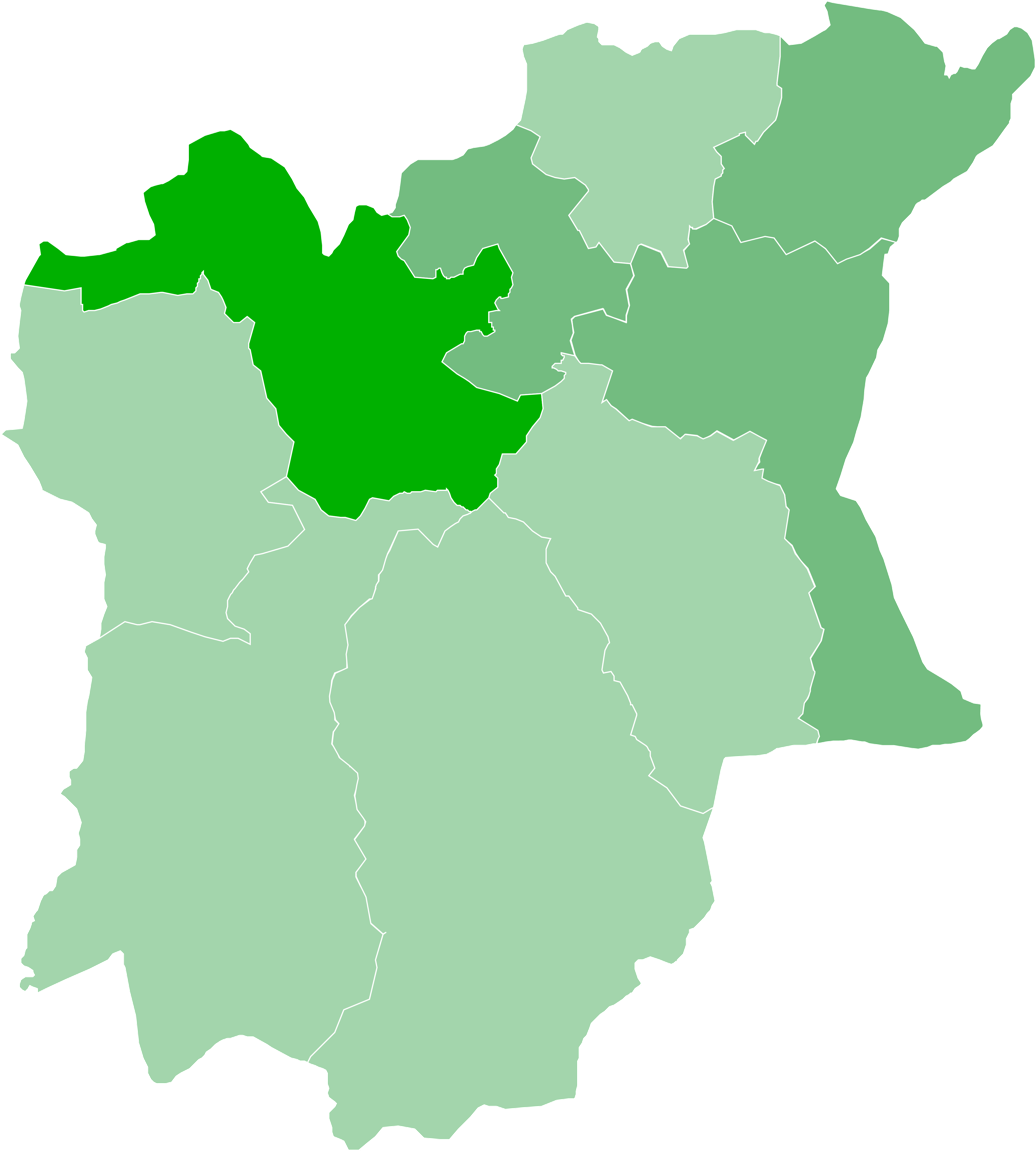
Adeleke; 40–50% 50–60% 60–70%

==== By local government area ====
The results of the election by local government area.

LGA	Oyetola APC		Adeleke PDP		Others		Total Valid Votes	Turnout Percentage
LGA	Votes	Percentage	Votes	Percentage	Votes	Percentage	Total Valid Votes	Turnout Percentage
Aiyedaade	14,527	50.11%	13,380	46.16%	1,081	3.73%	28,988	43.87%
Aiyedire	7,868	46.24%	7,402	43.51%	1,744	10.25%	17,014	46.55%
Atakunmosa East	7,449	50.08%	6,992	47.00%	434	2.92%	14,875	37.03%
Atakunmosa West (Note: Atakunmosa West: Results were voided in one polling unit due to an attack on the unit's presiding officer.)	6,601	44.62%	7,750	52.39%	443	2.99%	14,794	41.53%
Boluwaduro	5,649	47.89%	5,860	49.68%	286	2.43%	11,795	49.35%
Boripe	21,205	71.86%	7,595	25.74%	710	2.41%	29,510	43.30%
Ede North	9,603	28.15%	23,931	70.15%	579	1.70%	34,113	48.34%
Ede South	5,704	22.20%	19,438	75.66%	549	2.14%	25,691	47.81%
Egbedore (Note: Egbedore: Results were voided in 2 polling units due to overvoting.)	9,228	40.00%	13,230	57.34%	614	2.66%	23,072	44.12%
Ejigbo	14,355	43.07%	18,065	54.20%	909	2.73%	33,329	46.50%
Ife Central	17,880	54.94%	13,532	41.58%	1,132	3.48%	32,544	29.50%
Ife East	19,353	49.46%	18,071	46.19%	1,701	4.35%	39,125	35.50%
Ife North	9,964	47.34%	10,359	49.21%	727	3.45%	21,050	36.99%
Ife South	12,481	55.90%	9,116	40.83%	729	3.27%	22,326	40.41%
Ifedayo (Note: Ifedayo: Results were voided in one three registration area due to overvoting.)	5,016	50.61%	4,730	47.72%	166	1.67%	9,912	51.21%
Ifelodun (Note: Ifelodun: Results were voided in one polling unit due to overvoting.)	16,068	47.21%	17,107	50.26%	861	2.53%	34,036	43.52%
Ila	11,163	45.43%	13,036	53.05%	373	1.52%	24,572	53.42%
Ilesa East (Note: Ilesa East: Results were voided in 2 polling units due to ballot paper destruction attacks by "thugs.")	13,452	53.08%	10,969	43.28%	921	3.64%	25,342	35.60%
Ilesa West	10,777	42.43%	13,769	54.20%	857	3.37%	25,403	37.02%
Irepodun (Note: Irepodun: Results were voided in 2 polling units due to overvoting.)	12,122	41.75%	14,369	49.49%	2,541	8.75%	29,032	51.25%
Irewole	18,198	54.62%	14,216	42.67%	901	2.71%	33,315	45.97%
Isokan	10,833	48.46%	10,777	48.21%	743	3.32%	22,353	43.14%
Iwo	17,421	48.89%	16,914	47.47%	1,299	3.65%	35,634	40.57%
Obokun	9,727	40.85%	13,575	57.01%	511	2.14%	24,399	45.81%
Odo Otin (Note: Odo Otin: Results were voided in one polling unit due to voting disruption.)	13,482	47.83%	14,003	49.68%	700	2.48%	28,185	42.78%
Ola Oluwa	9,123	54.51%	7,205	43.05%	409	2.44%	16,737	46.28%
Olorunda	18,709	45.42%	21,350	51.84%	1,128	2.74%	41,187	40.04%
Oriade	14,189	45.86%	15,947	51.54%	805	2.60%	30,941	45.54%
Orolu	9,928	47.81%	10,282	49.52%	555	2.67%	20,765	53.41%
Osogbo	22,952	41.73%	30,401	55.28%	1,644	2.99%	54,997	39.27%
Totals	375,027	46.62%	403,371	50.14%	26,052	3.24%	804,450	42.16%

===== Notes =====
Election day notes by LGA

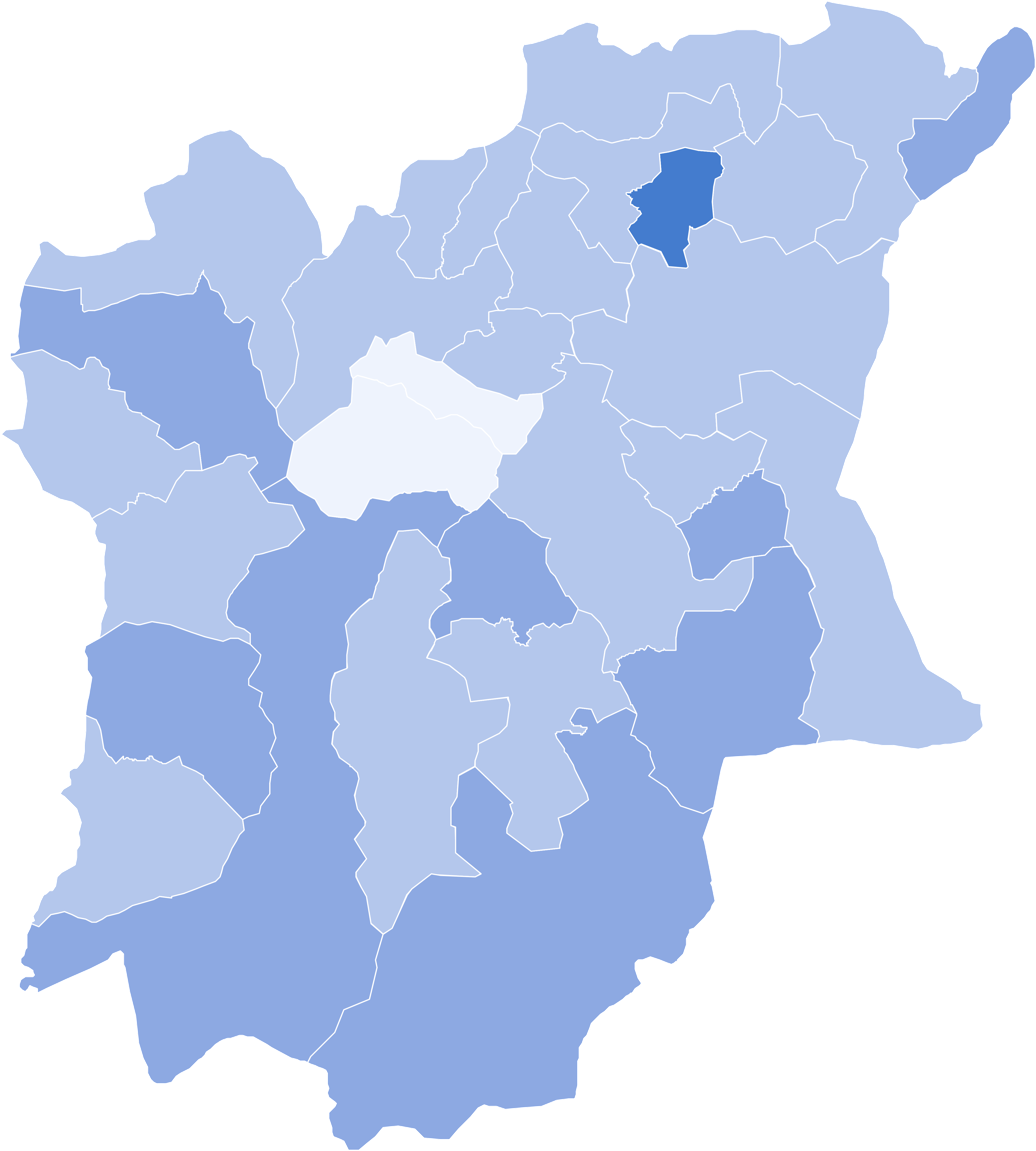
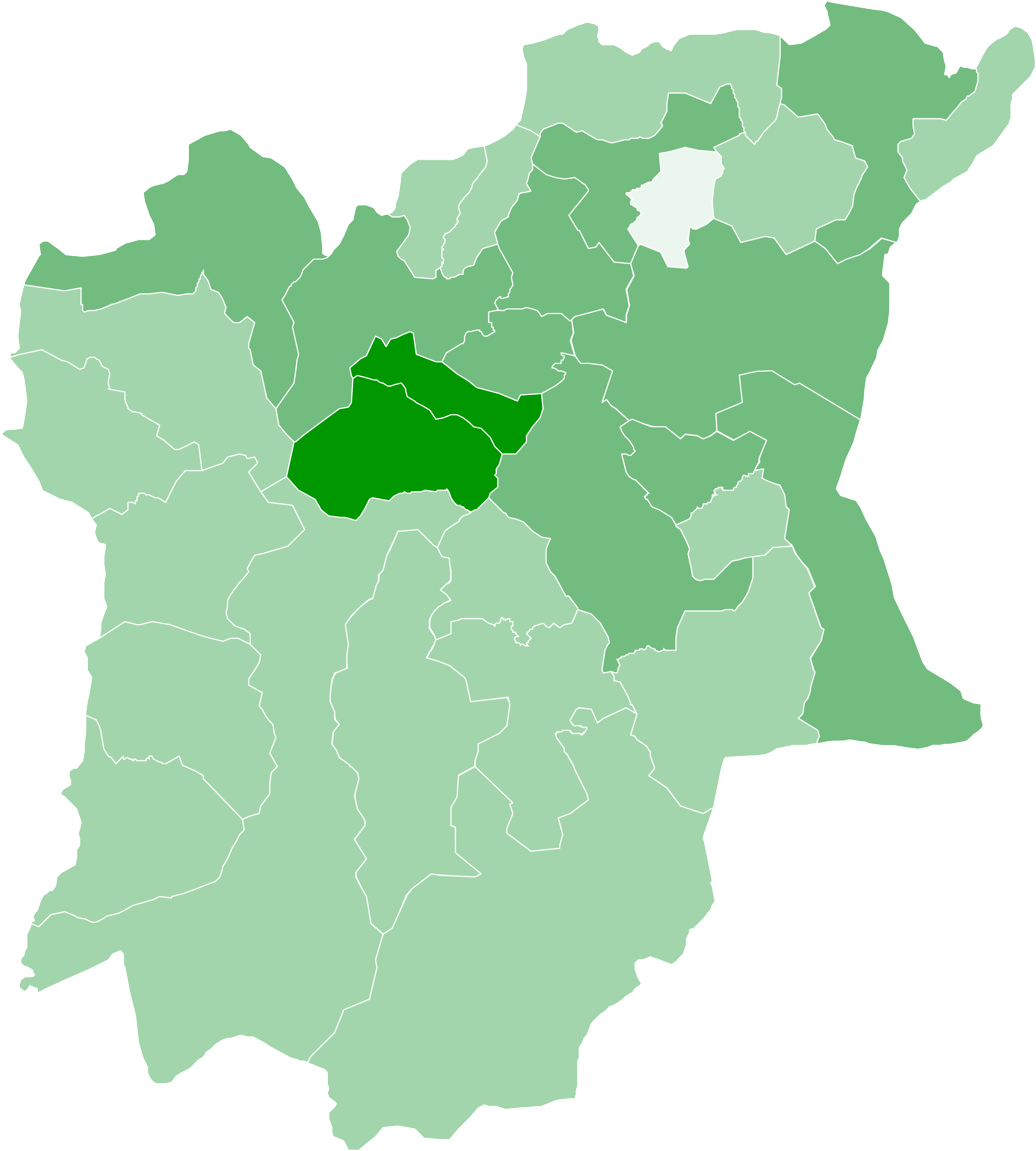
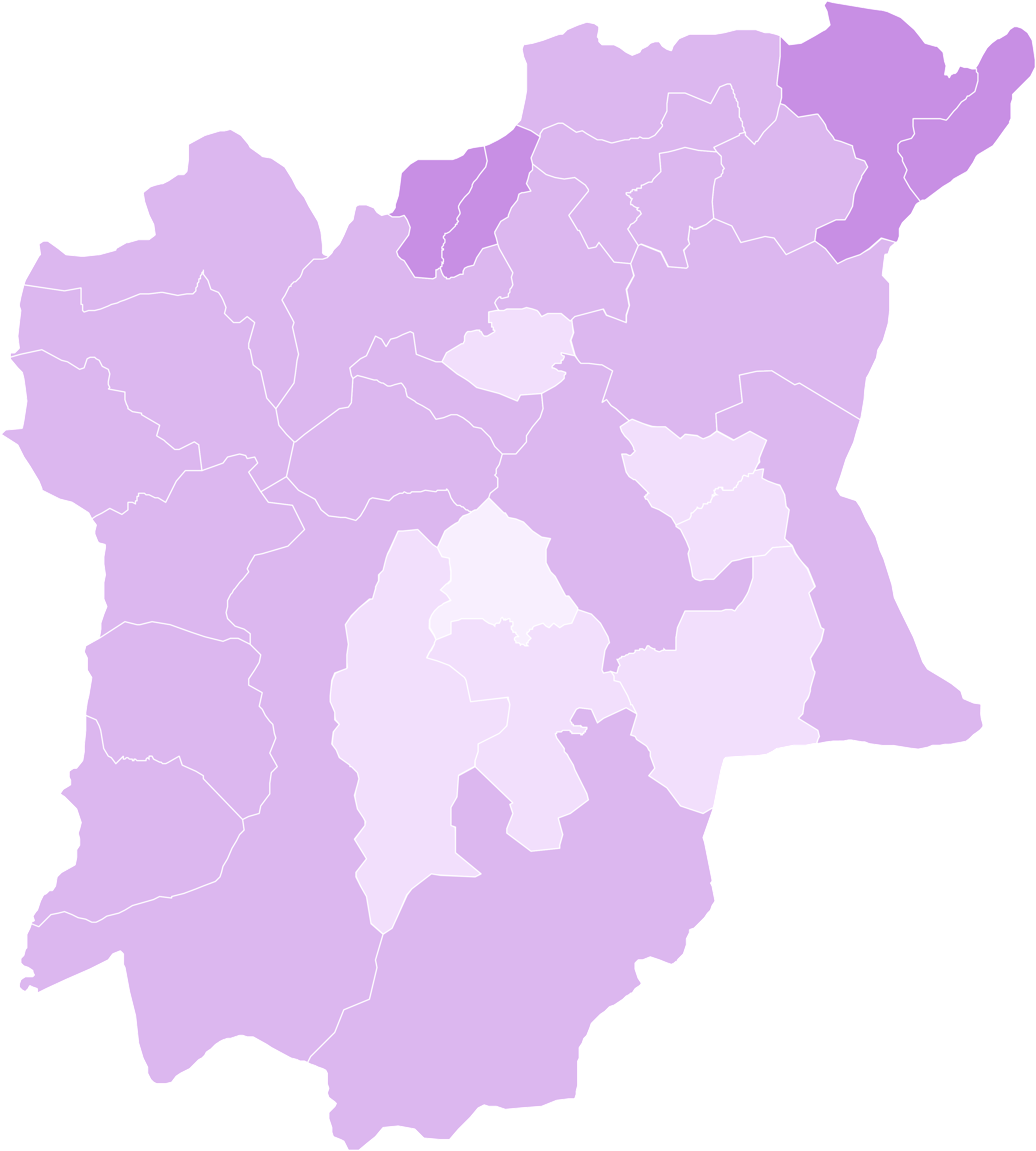
Percentage of the vote won by each major candidate by LGA.		Turnout Percentage by LGA
Oyetola <30% 40-50% 50–60% 70–80%	Adeleke <30% 40–50% 50–60% 70–80%	Turnout <30% 30–40% 40–50% 50–60%

=== Response ===
==== Candidates and parties ====
Before the results were even formally announced, videos of Adeleke and his supporters celebrating emerged after the PDP's own count reportedly confirmed his victory. After he was declared winner, Adeleke dedicated his victory to his late brother—Isiaka Adeleke—and the people of Osun State. For Oyetola's part, he did not initially respond to the results as a 17 July morning press release from his office simply said he had "taken cognisance of the results" and planned to study them in addition to consulting "with critical stakeholders of the party." Former Governor and serving minister Rauf Aregbesola—Oyetola's intraparty rival who boycotted the election and allegedly supported Adeleke—celebrated the results in social media posts titled Osun Le Tente (Note: Roughly translates as "Osun excelled" in Yoruba.) but deleted the posts soon afterwards with an aide saying the messages were "unauthorised."

On the national level, President Muhammadu Buhari congratulated Adeleke on the morning of 17 July and labeled the election as a positive step "towards strengthening the integrity of the electoral process in Nigeria" while APC National Chairman Abdullahi Adamu later stated the party's surprise at the results. Similarly to Buhari, PDP presidential nominee Atiku Abubakar and LP presidential nominee Peter Obi also congratulated Adeleke on 17 July. However, APC presidential nominee Bola Tinubu is yet to release a statement on the result, reportedly deferring to Oyetola for the next move.

It was not until 4 August that Oyetola or the state APC revealed their next plans when Osun APC Chairman Gboyega Famodun finally announced that the party planned to challenge the election results at the elections petitions tribunal.

==== Civil society ====
From civil society, reports spoke positively about the election turnout and INEC's administration but again noted the prevalence of vote buying. The nonprofit YIAGA Africa, which monitored the election and ran a parallel vote tabulation, stated that PVT had verified the accuracy of INEC's released results as the released totals for the two major candidates fell well within the ranges estimated by PVT. YIAGA stated that INEC's turnout and rejected ballot numbers were in estimated ranges as well. However, YIAGA and other groups like the Nigeria Civil Society Situation Room lamented the vote buying reports and called on authorities to come up with countermeasures.

=== Analysis ===
In the days after the election, political analysts noted several post-election takeaways with the political focus on the impact the results could have on the presidential race, especially since Oyetola is the relative and close ally of Bola Tinubu—the APC presidential nominee. Pundits also noted numerous potential reasons for the result, namely: the divide within the state APC, anger at the APC administration—both on the state and national levels, the political clout of the Adeleke family, and the successful Adeleke campaign which often featured his nephew Davido. Observers also noted anger at Oyetola over the alleged diversion of COVID-19 palliatives meant for the public and his administration's failure to pay owed civil servant salaries; in addition, post-election analysis examined specific cases of APC infighting in several LGAs that Adeleke eventually won, the extensive campaigning of PDP figures like former Senate President Bukola Saraki and Edo State Governor Godwin Obaseki, and the purported support that Aregbesola and LP nominee Lasun gave to Adeleke.

== Aftermath ==
=== Litigation ===
The tribunal opened its registry for complaints before election day with David Umar Dike, the Tribunal Secretary, noting that complainants had 21 days to file challenges. On 4 August, Osun APC Chairman Gboyega Famodun announced Oyetola's intent to challenge the results at the Election Petition Tribunal, stating that "we have a strong case and we believe we will win at the court." In response, Osun PDP Caretaker Committee Chairman Akindele Adekunle condemned the APC's contest to the election results, describing the move "as anti-people and a challenge of God's will" while expressing a lack of concern about the result of the challenge "as the election that produced the winner was adjudged to be of global democratic compliance." Later that month, Oyetola formally filed his petition and the Tribunal began hearing the challenge application on 22 August. As the case continued and the formal tribunal sitting date was set for 26 September, Oyetola's team proposed a relocation of the tribunal from Osogbo to Abuja but were rebuffed by an appeal court. After the initial hearings in September, the tribunal continued meeting until January to hear the Oyetola case which was based on overvoting in certain polling units and claims that Adeleke had falsified certificates. The date for the tribunal's judgment is set for 27 January. On the date, the tribunal ruled against Adeleke in a judgement that declared Oyetola the rightfully elected governor based on the reports of overvoting. The judgment sparked protests and prompted an immediate appeal from now-Governor Adeleke, who remains in office pending the results of further litigation.

=== Transition and inauguration ===
Adeleke and Adewusi received the certificates of return on 20 July at a brief ceremony at the Osun State INEC office in Osogbo. About a week later, Adeleke formed a 37-member transition committee chaired by former House of Representatives member Muyiwa Oladimeji. While inaugurating the committee, Adeleke tasked its members with forming an agenda for his first hundred days and his first year in office. About a week later, the House of Assembly began working on the Transition Bill 2022 to organize a clean transition. For Oyetola administration's part, despite the electoral challenge, moves were made to consolidate APC power in the state by scheduling local government elections for 15 October—about a month before the inauguration; the PDP protested the election as "illegal" and attempt to defraud the state while the Osun Independent Electoral Commission pointed out that the previous local government elections were four years beforehand. Although the elections were held, they were declared illegal by courts after the fact.

The inauguration was held on 27 November at the Oshogbo Stadium in Osogbo. Attendees included the Ooni of Ife, Davido, and several PDP governors along with the party's presidential nominee Atiku Abubakar; Oyetola did not attend the ceremony, instead publishing a farewell statement that noted his ongoing challenge to the election results. Adeleke and Adewusi were sworn in by the Chief Judge of the Osun State High Court—Oyebola Adepele-Ojo; Adeleke then gave an inaugural address in which he announced a freeze order on all state government accounts, vowed to investigate corruption from the Oyetola administration, ordered the reversion of the state name back to "Osun State" from "State of Osun," (Note: In 2011, then-Governor Rauf Aregbesola changed the state name to the "State of Osun." Although courts ruled the move unconstitutional and Aregbesola left office in 2018, the state government continued to intermittently use the "State of Osun" name until Adeleke's inauguration in 2022.) and reversed several Oyetola appointments. The next day, a flurry of executive orders codified these inauguration vows along with mandating the review of all Oyetola's traditional ruler enthronements after the election, ordering the dethronement of three traditional rulers, and reversing all other Oyetola appointments made after the election along with commencing reviews and a staff sudit.

== See also ==
- 2022 Nigerian elections
- 2022 Nigerian gubernatorial elections
