= 2022 Nigerian gubernatorial elections =

- 18 June and 16 July 2022

2 governorships
	Majority party	Minority party	Third party
Party	APC	PDP	APGA
Seats before	22	13	1
Seats after	21	14	1
Seat change	▼1	▲1	0
Popular vote	562,084	470,828	376
Percentage	48.61%	40.72%	0.03%
Seats up	2	0	0
Seats won	1	1	0

The 2022 Nigerian gubernatorial elections were held on 18 June 2022, in Ekiti State, and on 16 July 2022, in Osun State. The last regular gubernatorial elections for both states were in 2018. Before the elections, the All Progressives Congress held both offices with Ekiti Governor Kayode Fayemi being term-limited after serving his second nonconsecutive term and Osun Governor Gboyega Oyetola running for a second term with his party's nomination. In the post-elections situation, the APC held Ekiti with a victory for former Secretary to the State Government Abiodun Oyebanji but lost Osun as Oyetola was defeated by former Senator Ademola Adeleke—the nominee of the Peoples Democratic Party.

== Results summary ==
State	Incumbent			Results	
State	Incumbent	Party	First elected	Status	Candidates
Ekiti	Kayode Fayemi	APC	2018 (Note: Fayemi also served as governor from 2010 to 2014)	Incumbent term-limited New governor elected APC hold	Abiodun Oyebanji (APC) 53.16%; Olusegun Oni (SDP) 23.37%; Bisi Kolawole (PDP) 19.17%
Osun	Gboyega Oyetola	APC	2018	Incumbent lost re-election New governor elected PDP gain	Ademola Adeleke (PDP) 50.14%; Gboyega Oyetola (APC) 46.62%

== Ekiti State ==
2022 Ekiti State gubernatorial election
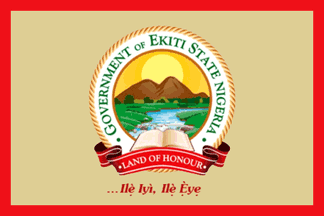
- 18 June 2022
- Turnout: 36.47%
Nominee	Abiodun Oyebanji	Olusegun Oni	Bisi Kolawole
Party	APC	SDP	PDP
Running mate	Monisade Afuye	Ladi Owolabi	Kolapo Kolade
Popular vote	187,057	82,211	67,457
Percentage	53.16%	23.37%	19.17%
Governor before election
Kayode Fayemi
APC
Elected Governor
Abiodun Oyebanji
APC

Incumbent Governor Kayode Fayemi (APC) was re-elected to a second nonconsecutive term in 2018 with 51.34% of the vote. He was term-limited in 2022, and was therefore unable to seek re-election for a third term. Eight APC candidates competed for the party's nomination, although seven of the aspirants withdrew on the day of the primary in protest of the process' alleged bias towards the eventual winner, Abiodun Oyebanji (former Secretary to the State Government). Later on 27 January, official results were announced with Oyebanji defeating Kayode Ojo (businessman) and Michael Opeyemi Bamidele (Senator for Ekiti Central, former House of Representatives member, and former Lagos State cabinet official) along with the five other withdrawn candidates by over 100,000 votes in a direct primary.

Of the PDP candidates, Bisi Kolawole (former Ekiti State PDP Chairman, former Commissioner for Environment, and former House of Assembly member) emerged victorious over former Governor Olusegun Oni and former Deputy Governor Kolapo Olushola after Kolawole's main opponent Ekiti South Senator Abiodun Olujimi withdrew in protest of the primary's alleged bias. Kolawole defeated Oni, Olushola, Adewale Aribisala (former House of Representatives member and PDP National Treasurer), and Kayode Adaramodu (banker) along with other aspirants by over 300 votes in an indirect primary on 26 January. However, Oni rejected the primary results before defecting to the SDP and obtaining its nomination.

The general election was noted by its great logistical organisation and peaceful voting, despite a turbulent campaign period marked by several notable interparty clashes. By the early morning of 19 June, collation completed and INEC declared Oyebanji as the victor. In total, Oyebanji obtained about 187,000 votes and 53% of the vote as runner-up Oni received around 82,000 votes and 23% of the vote while Kolawole came third with over 67,000 votes and 19% of the vote. Electoral analysis focused on the impact of the ruinous divides within the state PDP compared to the state APC's post-primary reconciliation along with the draw of Oni's candidacy. Civil society and election observer groups concentrated on instances of vote-buying along the highly successful election administration by INEC which resulted in smooth voting, direct online transmission of results, and one of the earliest winner declarations in recent Nigerian history as the result was announced on the night of the election.

== Osun State ==
2022 Osun State gubernatorial election
- 16 July 2022
- Turnout: 42.16% (Note: While 42.16% of registered voters cast a vote—either validly or invalidly, three other metrics for calculating turnout can also be used: the percent of registered voters that were accredited to vote (42.37%), the percent of Permanent Voter Card-holding voters that were accredited to vote (54.48%), and the percent of Permanent Voter Card-holding voters that cast a vote—either validly or invalidly (54.21%).)
Nominee	Ademola Adeleke	Gboyega Oyetola
Party	PDP	APC
Running mate	Kola Adewusi	Benedict Gboyega Alabi
Popular vote	403,371	375,027
Percentage	50.14%	46.62%
- Results by local government area
Governor before election
Gboyega Oyetola
APC
Elected Governor
Ademola Adeleke
PDP

Incumbent Governor Gboyega Oyetola (APC) was elected to a first term in 2018 and sought reelection for a second and final term. Former House of Representatives member for Irepodun/Olurunda/Osogbo/Orolu and 2018 APC gubernatorial candidate Yusuf Sulaimon Lasun along with former Secretary to the State Government Moshood Adeoti attempted to unseat Oyetola in the APC primary but were defeated by over 200,000 votes on 19 February.

For the PDP, six candidates purchased nomination forms, however, four dropped out prior to the primary and on primary date, two separate primaries were held that gave different results. The primary backed by former Governor Olagunsoye Oyinlola nominated Dotun Babayemi (2019 ADP Osun West senatorial nominee and son of former Olufi of Gbongan Solomon Oyewole Babayemi) but the primary that nominated Ademola Adeleke (former Senator for Osun West and 2018 PDP gubernatorial nominee) was recognized by the national PDP. As the latter was observed by INEC, Adeleke became the legitimate PDP nominee.

The general election was noted by solid logistical organisation and mainly peaceful voting but was marred by reports of vote buying. By the early morning of 17 July, collation completed and the Independent National Electoral Commission declared Adeleke as the winner. In total, Adeleke won over 400,000 votes and 50% of the vote as runner-up Oyetola received around 375,000 votes and over 46% of the vote. Electoral analysis focused on the effect of the divisions within the state APC along with the election's national impact as the final election before the presidential election in 2023. Civil society and election observer groups concentrated on the vote-buying reports but commended the highly successful election administration by INEC which resulted in smooth voting, direct online transmission of results, and an early winner declaration. However, Oyetola rejected the results and filed a challenge at the electoral tribunal. In a separate court case, Oyetola's nomination was voided after a court ruled that the APC gubernatorial primary was illegally conducted; however, Oyetola won the appeal.

== See also ==
- 2022 Nigerian elections
