= Lawrence Babatunde Ayeni =

Nigerian politician

Member of the House of Representatives
- In office 2019–2023
- Constituency: Atakunmosa East/Atakunmosa West/Ilesa East/Ilesa West Federal Constituency

Personal details
- Born: March 31, 1961 (age 65) Osun State, Nigeria
- Party: All Progressives Congress
- Occupation: Politician

Lawrence Babatunde Ayeni (born on March 31, 1961), is a Nigerian politician who served as a member of the House of Representatives, representing the Atakunmosa East/Atakunmosa West/Ilesa East/Ilesa West Federal Constituency in Osun State, under the umbrella of the All Progressives Congress (APC), from 2019 to 2023.

== Early life and education ==
Lawrence was born on March 31, 1961 in Osun State Nigeria. He is a member of All Progressives Congress and served as the member of National Assembly between 2019 and 2023.
