= Yusuf Sulaimon Lasun =

Nigerian politician (born 1960)

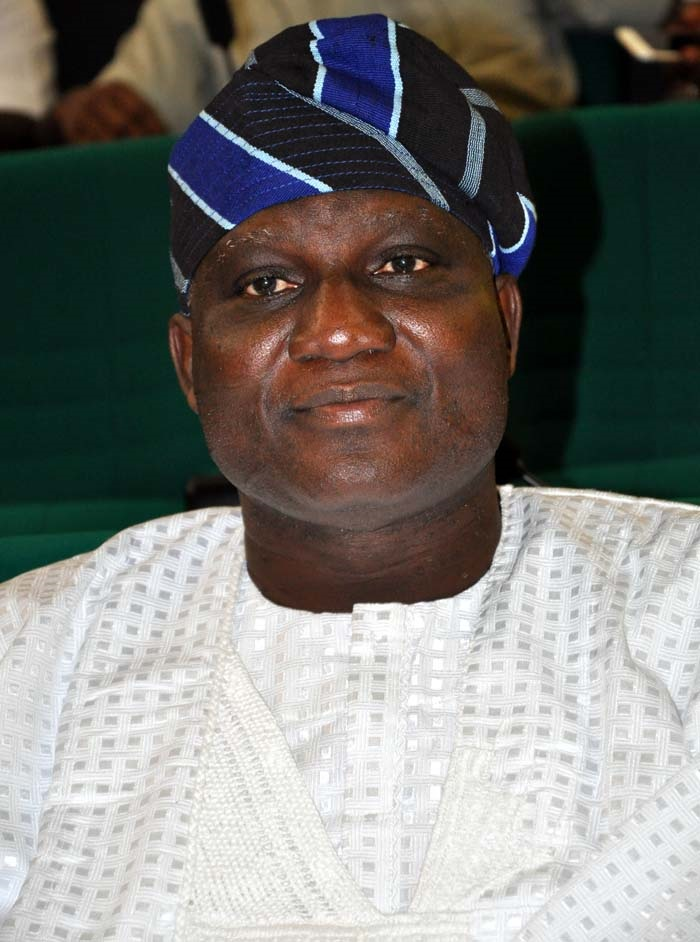

Deputy Speaker of the House of Representatives of Nigeria
- In office 9 June 2015 – 9 June 2019
- Speaker: Yakubu Dogara
- Preceded by: Chukwuemeka Ihedioha
- Succeeded by: Ahmed Idris Wase

Member of the House of Representatives of Nigeria from Osun
- In office 6 June 2011 – 9 June 2019
- Preceded by: Leo Awoyemi Adejare
- Succeeded by: Olubukola Oyewo
- Constituency: Irepodun/Olurunda/Osogbo/Orolu

Personal details
- Born: 4 October 1960 (age 65) Ilobu, Western Region, Nigeria (now in Osun State)
- Party: Peoples Democratic Party (2018–2022; 2022–present)
- Other political affiliations: Unity Party of Nigeria (1979–1983); Alliance for Democracy (1999–2006); Action Congress of Nigeria (2006–2013); All Progressives Congress (2013–2018); Labour Party (2022)
- Relations: Married
- Education: University of Ibadan; Obafemi Awolowo University
- Occupation: Politician; engineer

Yusuf Sulaimon Lasun (born 4 October 1960) is a Nigerian politician who served as the deputy speaker of the House of Representatives of Nigeria from 2015 to 2019. He represented Irepodun /Olurunda /Osogbo /Orolu Federal Constituency of Osun State in the House.

== Early life and education ==
Lasun was born on 4 October 1960. He is from Ilobu, which is ten minutes' drive from Osogbo and the administrative headquarters of Irepodun Local Government Area, Osun State in the south-western part of Nigeria. He started his formal education at the Local Authority Primary School in Ilobu, Osun State. He proceeded on his secondary education at Ansar-Ud-Deen Secondary School, Erin, and later moved to Ifon/Erin Community High School Ifon, both in Osun State from 1973 to 1979. He secured an admission into the University of Ibadan, Ibadan, Oyo State where he studied Mechanical Engineering, and earned a Bachelor of Science (Hons) degree. Lasun is a chartered engineer and holds a master's degree in Mechanical Engineering from the Obafemi Awolowo University, Ile-Ife.

== Political career ==
Lasun is a grassroot politician widely known in Osun State and he is fondly called "The Homeboy" due to his grassroot qualities. He was once a youth leader in the Unity Party of Nigeria (UPN). He was also the state Public Relations Officer (PRO) of the Alliance for Democracy before and during Chief Bisi Akande's administration. With his undiluted loyalty, unquantifiable role played in the Alliance of Democracy and his doggedness in the political cycle in the state, the governor of Osun State, Prince Olagunsoye Oyinlola appointed him chairman of Osun State Capital Territory Development Authority OSCTDA in 2004/2005, a body established by law with a mandate to facilitate the urban growth of Osogbo and neighbouring towns.

In 2011, he ran for a legislative seat in the 7th National Assembly as the representative of the Irepodun/Olurunda/Osogbo/Orolu Federal Constituency. He won on the platform of Action Congress of Nigeria, which joined the All Progressives Congress with other parties in the run-up to the 2015 general elections in Nigeria. He was appointed deputy chairman, House of Representatives Committee on Water Resources by the then Speaker, Aminu Waziri Tambuwal. He was also a member of the Constitutional Review Committee.

Lasun was elected to the House of Representatives for a second time on the All Progressives Congress' platform in March 2015. He was elected Deputy Speaker of the 8th House of Representatives by 203 members of the House out of the 357 that participated in the in-house election. Yakubu Dogara was elected Speaker.

Lasun decamped from the All Progressive Congress to the Peoples Democratic Party on 15 September 2018.

In the year 2022, he was a gubernatorial candidate of the Labour Party in the 2022 Osun State gubernatorial election but lost to the candidate of the Peoples Democratic Party, Ademola Adeleke. Lasun would later decamp to the PDP after the elections

== Legislative activities ==
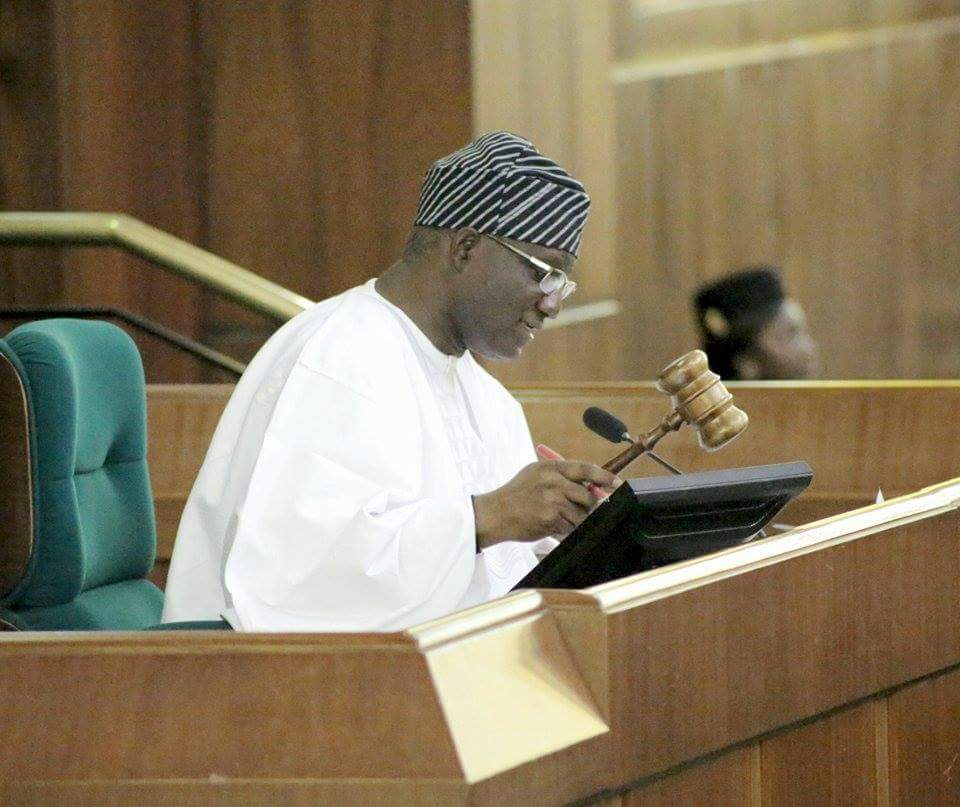
Lasun presiding over the House

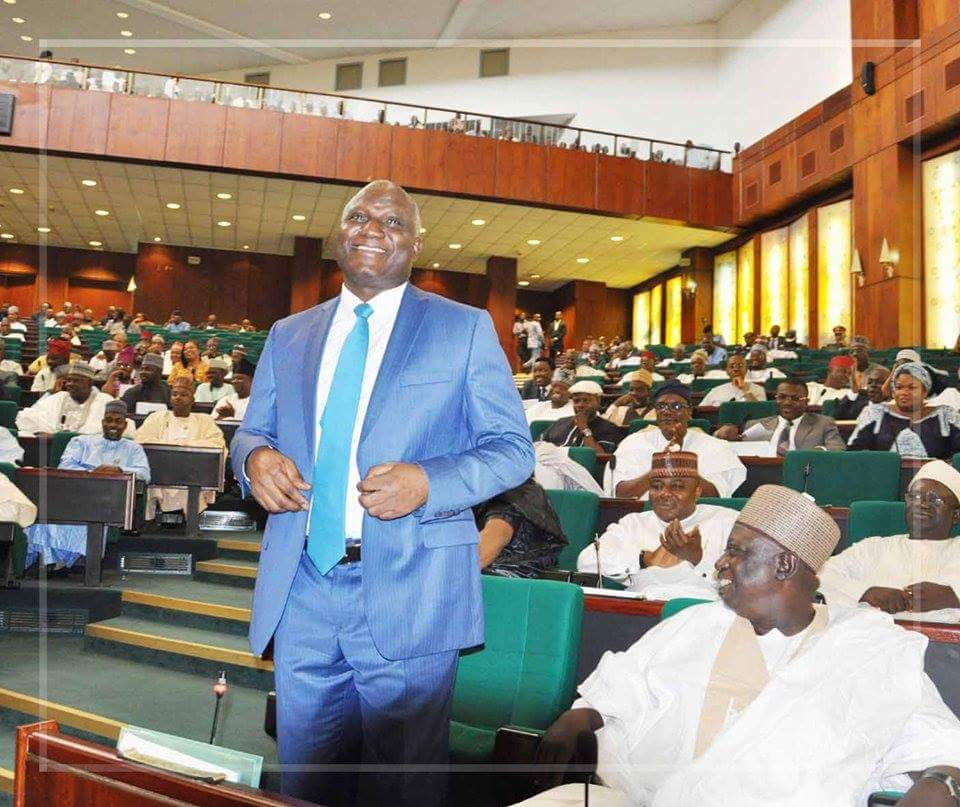
Lasun during a session

Lasun has presided over the affairs of the House when the Speaker, Yakubu Dogara, was unavoidably absent or had to participate on the floor of the House. Lasun led some members of the House to the 15th Commonwealth Speakers and Presiding Officers Conference African Region, in Accra, Ghana, in November, 2015. He was the deputy chairperson of the conference. He represented the Speaker at an investigative public hearing on the activities of the Nigerian Electricity Regulatory Commission (NERC) conducted by the House Committee on Power at the National Assembly on Tuesday, December 1, 2015. He presided over the House during the second reading of a bill seeking to legalise the establishment of the North - East Development Commission, which was sponsored by the Speaker, Yakubu Dogara.
