= Popoola Olufemi =

Nigerian politician

Popoola Simeon Olufemi is a Nigerian politician. He currently serves as the State Representatives representing Boripe/Boluwa-Duro constituency of Osun state in the10th National Assembly.
