= Erelu Abeni Adeleke =

Nigerian business personality

- Born: 28 August 1973 (age 53)
- Occupations: businesswoman, Philanthropist
- Spouse: Ademola Adeleke

Erelu Abeni Adeleke (born 28 August 1973) is a Nigerian businesswoman, feminist activist, policy advocate, social change, philanthropist and United Nations Ambassador for peace.

She is an NBR Hall of Fame awardee and initiator behind Osun Market Week, Osun State's cultural heritage while empowering local textile entrepreneurs.

== Education ==
Abeni Adeleke holds a B.Sc. in Psychology from the University of Nigeria, Nsukka, and an MBA in Advertising and Public Relations from Imo State University.

== Career ==
She is the founder of Esther Adeleke Humanitarian Foundation but started her early career at Societe Generale Bank, FIN Bank, UBA, and Union Bank before retiring from active service in 2018 to support her husband's political career.

In February 2023, she enrolled 30 grassroots youth in a skill acquisition program under her foundation. Erelu partnered with the Enterprise Development Center of Pan-Atlantic University and Fidelity Food Bank Initiative in driving SME empowerment programs.

In 2024, She sponsorsed the Osun State Female Secondary School Table Tennis Championship. Her partnership with the Rural Water and Environmental Sanitation Agency (RUWESA),has helped to drive programs focused on sanitation, hygiene, and community development, improving access to clean water and health education in rural areas.

Ngozi Conditional Cash Transfer Program, has assisted over 40,000 girls across all 19 Local Government Areas to stay in school. She has been at the forefront of campaigns for the enactment of laws to curb gender-based violence, equal opportunities, and reduction of stigma associated with HIV.

She championed initiatives to ensure access to quality schooling. She is an Ambassador of the “Pad Up A Girl Child” initiative and forerunner of the “Educate A Child, Save Our Future” program by the Nigerian Youth Congress Osun State Chapter. Through her initiatives she addressed menstrual hygiene and educational access for 100,000 female students across Osun’s local governments.

== Recognition ==
Erelu Abeni Adèleke is the Erelu Asoludero of Erimo Kingdom,Erelu Atunwase of Akola-Ijesha Kingdom and Erelu Asoludero of Oke Ila Kingdom. She is a fellow of Institute of Consulting and the Chartered Institute of Management and Leadership ( CIML). In 2023, She received award of recognition from International Breweries plc as part of the Sixty Million Naira Empowerment Initiative and Kickstart Awards, World Royal Award designation as the World’s Most Iconic Exuberant Woman and Excellent Award from the Resident Doctors of Osun State University Teaching Hospital for her dedication to women, children, and youth

== Personal life ==
She is the wife of Governor Ademola Adeleke.
