= 2018 Osun State gubernatorial election =

- 22 September 2018 (first round); 27 September 2018 (rerun)
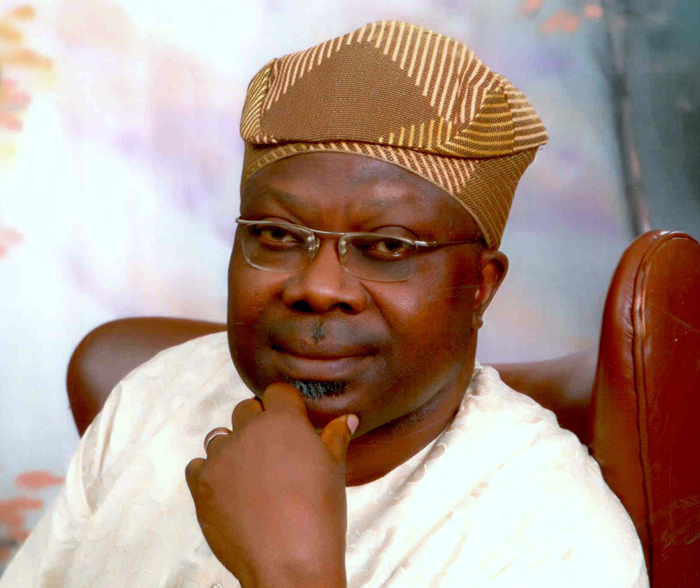
Nominee	Gboyega Oyetola	Ademola Adeleke	Iyiola Omisore
Party	APC	PDP	SDP
Popular vote	255,505	255,023	128,053
Percentage	36.71%	36.64%	18.40%
Candidate	Moshood Adeoti
Party	ADP
Popular vote	49,745
Percentage	7.15%
Governor before election
Rauf Aregbesola
All Progressives Congress
Elected Governor
Gboyega Oyetola
All Progressives Congress

The Osun State gubernatorial election took place on 22 September 2018. The election was held alone where national and state level elections were to be held by 2019. Two-term incumbent Governor Rauf Aregbesola of the All Progressives Congress was in-eligible to run for re-election. Ademola Adeleke of the People's Democratic Party won the initial election as announced by INEC. but was defeated in a rerun on 27 September by Gboyega Oyetola.

== Background ==
Rauf Aregbesola previously served as a commissioner in Lagos State under Bola Tinubu's administration prior to becoming governor.

== Results ==
The rerun on 27 September was called after the first round was declared inconclusive, on account of Ademola's margin of victory being smaller than the number of cancelled votes in seven polling units

=== Rerun Election ===
Candidate	Party	Votes	%
Gboyega Oyetola	All Progressives Congress	255,505	36.71
Ademola Adeleke	People's Democratic Party	255,023	36.64
Iyiola Omisore	Social Democratic Party	128,053	18.40
Moshood Adeoti	Action Democratic Party	49,745	7.15
Fatai Akinade Akinbade	African Democratic Congress	7,681	1.10
Total		696,007	100.00
Registered voters/turnout		696,007	–
