= Ifon Osun =

- town
- Location in Nigeria
- Coordinates: 7°52′N 4°29′E
- Country: Nigeria
- State: Osun State
- LGA: Orolu
- Time zone: UTC+1 (WAT)

Ifon Osun is a large town in Osun State, Nigeria. It is the headquarters of the Orolu Local Government Area. It consists of many great chiefs and compounds. They include Eesa, Afin, Laaropo, Eleesi, Sobaloju, Aaje, Alasape, Ooye, Asade, Ile Basorun, Ile Oba, etc. too numerous to mention. It is a great kingdom of the descendants of Obatala, has about 74 villages surrounding the town. The town has an official Post Office and a Local Government Library. Predominantly fertile and grassy forest suitable for farming and agro-forestry. It has a stream named Owala on its boundary with Ilie township. It has many attributes for tourist attraction. Home to a notable prince, Adesola Adegboyega Akande and others such as Durotomi Amuda, Bashiru Akanfe Tijani, Professor Ademola Oladejo, Dr. Oyewo, Rufus Woleola Ojo, Chief James Layioye Ojo, Wale Ojo (Awake), Alhaji Sulaiman Bello Oyegbemi, Chief Bayo Zakariyah Bello Oyegbemi, Chief Joseph Afolabi Ogo-Oluwa, and Alhaji Rasheed Oyedele. The mode of selecting an olufon of ifon - the traditional ruler of Ifon Osun, is by consulting Obatala and the Olufon Deity. This will then be proceeded by a validation based on 1979 declaration by Orolu local government and Osun state government as the 1988 declaration has been declared null void and improperly made by Justice Babatunji Olowofoyeku of Osun State High Court, Osogbo.

Government

Hon Abolade Nureni Adekunle

Chairman Orolu Local government area
