= Owala =

River in Nigeria

Owala Stream

Location
- Country: Nigeria
- State: Osun
- Town: Ifon Osun

Physical characteristics
- Length: 7 km (4.3 mi)

Owala Stream is a river in Ifon Osun, Osun State, Nigeria, near Ilie town. The river covers about 7 km (4.3 mi) and is used in dam-building and irrigation because of its fertile surrounding soil.

In February 2026, the Osun State Government announced a $5 million investment for the development of the Owala Water Dam project.
