= Ede North/Ede South/Egbedore/Ejigbo =

Ede North/Ede South/Egbedore/Ejigbo is a National Assembly constituency in Osun State. The constituency is represented by Bamidele Salam.

It covers the Local Government Areas of Ede South, Ede North, Egbedore and Ejigbo.
