= Kafayat Oyetola =

Nigeria politician and philanthropist

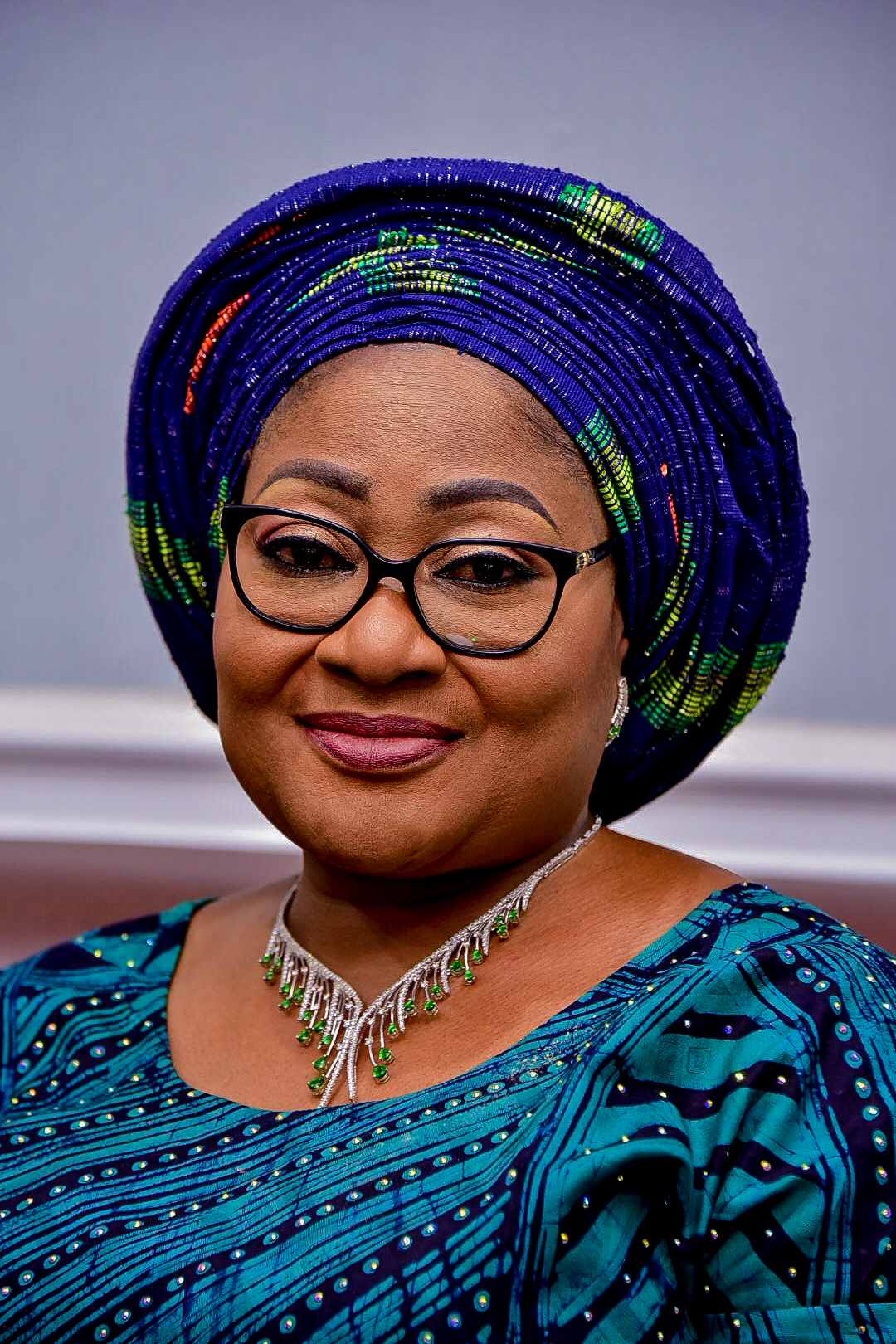

First Lady of Osun State
- In role 27 November 2018 – 27 November 2022
- Governor: Gboyega Oyetola
- Preceded by: Sherifat Aregbesola
- Succeeded by: Titilola Adeleke

Personal details
- Born: 2 April 1960 (age 66) Osogbo, Western Region, British Nigeria (now in Osun State, Nigeria)
- Party: All Progressives Congress
- Spouse: Gboyega Oyetola
- Children: 4

Kafayat Olaitan Oyetola (born 2 April 1960) is a Nigerian humanitarian, philanthropist, and wife of Gboyega Oyetola, the ninth governor of Osun State, Nigeria. She assumed the position of first lady of Osun State on 27 November 2018 after the swearing-in of her husband as the executive governor of the state.

== Early life and academics ==
Kafayat was born on 2 April 1960, in Osogbo, and attended All Saints Primary School, Osogbo, from 1966 to 1971. She then attended Osogbo Grammar School between 1973 and 1977, after which she attended college in Wiltshire, England, in 1978 for her O-Level before returning to Nigeria. On returning to Nigeria, she attended Kaduna Polytechnic for her OND between 1979 and 1982 before graduating from Yaba College of Technology, where she studied printing technology from 1983 to 1985.

She had childhood dreams of becoming a lawyer, and in an interview granted to Punch News Papers, she still nurses a desire to study law.

== Career ==
Kafayat has a professional career in the printing industry:

- Paste up artist with The Punch Nigeria Limited on industrial attachment in 1981
- The Concord Press paste up artist in 1982
- Lithographer for The Litramed Publication Oregun Lagos 1982 to 1983
- Lithographer The Guardian newspaper during her NYSC 1985 to1986
- Estimator for The Guardian Express Newspaper (subsidiary guardian) 1986 to 1989
- Production manager Ibukunoluwa Prints Nigeria Limited 1990 to 1992

Shortly after she returned from the United Kingdom, she traveled to Kaduna for a visit, during which she met Adeboyega Oyetola and years later, got married. They have four children: three daughters and a son.

== Ilerioluwa Development Initiative ==
She is the founder and president of Ilerioluwa Development Initiative, an NGO focused on providing assistance to less-privileged women and children in Nigeria.

== See also ==
- List of first ladies of Nigerian states
