= Kola Adewusi =

Nigerian politician

His Excellency Kola Adewusi

Deputy Governor of Osun State
- Incumbent
- Assumed office 27 November 2022
- Governor: Ademola Adeleke
- Preceded by: Benedict Alabi

Personal details
- Born: 5 October 1968 (age 57)
- Party: Accord

Omoba Kola Adewusi (born 5 October 1968) is a Nigerian politician, who has served as deputy governor of Osun State since 2022. Adewusi was elected deputy governor in the 2022 Osun State gubernatorial election.
