= Ademola Adeleke =

Nigerian politician (born 1960)

His Excellency Ademola Adeleke

Governor of Osun State
- Incumbent
- Assumed office 27 November 2022
- Deputy: Kola Adewusi
- Preceded by: Gboyega Oyetola

Senator for Osun West
- In office 2017–2019
- Preceded by: Isiaka Adeleke
- Succeeded by: Adelere Adeyemi Oriolowo

Personal details
- Born: Ademola Nurudeen Adeleke; 13 May 1960 (age 66) Enugu State, Nigeria
- Party: Accord
- Spouse: Titilola Adeleke
- Relations: Isiaka Adeleke (brother); Adedeji Adeleke (brother); Davido (nephew)
- Children: B-Red; Adenike Adeleke
- Education: Jacksonville State University; Atlanta Metropolitan State College
- Occupation: Politician; businessman; administrator

Ademola Nurudeen Jackson Adeleke (born 13 May 1960) is a Nigerian politician and businessman who has been serving as the governor of Osun State since 2022. He served as the senator representing the Osun-West senatorial district from 2017 to 2019.

He contested in the 2022 Osun State gubernatorial election under the platform of the Peoples Democratic Party and defeated incumbent governor, Adegboyega Isiaka Oyetola of the All Progressives Congress, who defeated him in the 2018 Osun State gubernatorial election rerun.

Adeleke contested in the 2026 Osun State gubernatorial election under the platform of Accord party. On 16 August 2026, he was re-elected the governor of Osun State after defeating All Progressives Congress candidate Bola Oyebamiji in the governorship election. He was declared the winner by the Independent National Electoral Commission (INEC) after polling 511,067 votes to Oyebamiji's 444,815.

== Education ==
Adeleke commenced his primary education at Methodist Primary School, Surulere Lagos State then relocated to Old Oyo State and attended Nawarudeen Primary School, Ikire. He progressed to The Seventh Day Adventist Secondary School, Ede also in the then Old Oyo State and later moved to Ede Muslim Grammar School Ede, where he finished his secondary school education before relocating to the United States. As he left Nigeria to continue his studies joining his two other elder brothers in the United States. He started higher studies at Jacksonville State University, Alabama in the United States where he majored in criminal justice and with minor in political science. After much controversies surrounding his educational qualification, he went back to school and got enrolled at Atlanta Metropolitan State College in the United States, where he earned a Bachelor of Science degree in criminal justice in 2021.

== Career ==
=== Private sector ===
Adeleke is a businessman and administrator; he served as an executive director of Guinness Nigeria Plc from 1992 to 1999, where his co-directors included General Theophilus Danjuma; he was the group executive director of Pacific Holdings Limited from 2001 to 2016. Prior to joining Pacific Holdings Limited, Ademola had worked with Quicksilver Courier Company in Atlanta, Georgia, US, as a service contractor in 1985–1989. He progressed to Origin International LLC, Atlanta, Georgia, US, a flavour and fragrance manufacturing company as vice president from 1990 to 1994.

=== Politics ===
Adeleke is a community member and philanthropist. He started his political career in 2001 alongside his late brother Senator Isiaka Adeleke who died in April 2017. He contested the Osun west 2017 by-election after the death of his brother, emerging as the winner under the Peoples Democratic Party.

Adeleke was a member of the All Progressives Congress until he decamped to the Peoples Democratic Party in April 2017.

On 23 July 2018, Adeleke emerged as the governorship candidate of PDP in Osun State after defeating Akin Ogunbiyi by seven votes.

In 2025, He won the Nigerian Icon of Good Governance (NIGG) Award by the Nigerian Books of Record (NBR) and also earned a place in the revered NBR Hall of Fame. In December 2025, Adeleke announced that he was decamping from the Peoples Democratic Party, following the announcement several days later he announced he has joined Accord party.

== Certificate scandal ==
Adeleke was accused and charged to the Osogbo high court for forging his secondary school testimonial and WAEC result to cancel his governorship candidacy. The testimonial Adeleke submitted to INEC dated 20 July 1988, as its Heading Ede Muslim Grammar School, Osun State, as at that year Osun state was not in existence. Also the SSCE results indicated in the testimonial shows that the mode of examination wasn't existing in the year 1981 Another testimonial with the Heading Ede Muslim High school dated 2018, indicates that the principal which signed the 1988 testimonial also signed the 2018 testimonial, this led to the arrest of the principal by the police. Adeleke's lawyer in his defense claims his secondary school hasn't come out to deny his testimonial asking the court to dismiss the Case. The court dismissed the suit stating that the plaintiff could not prove Adeleke's forgery. Witnesses told the court that they didn't see Adeleke in the examination hall. One of the witnesses said he would have recognised him since he is a public figure.

== Governorship race ==
Adeleke ran for Osun state governorship election under the PDP against top contenders Alhaji Gboyega Oyetola of APC and Iyiola Omisore of SDP on 22 September 2018. The election was declared inconclusive by the Independent Electoral Commission (INEC) and a rerun slated on 27 September 2018. The candidate of the APC, Oyetola, was declared winner after the run-off. Adeleke protested the result describing the election as a "coup".

On 22 March 2019, the tribunal sitting in Abuja declared Adeleke the winner of the election.

The Supreme Court later affirmed Gboyega Oyetola as the authentic winner of the 2018 Osun State governorship election on Friday, 5 July 2019.

In 2022, Adeleke contested in the gubernatorial election of 16 July under the PDP against incumbent governor Gboyega Oyetola. Adeleke defeated Gboyega Oyetola with 402,979 votes to 375,077 votes. Adeleke won in 17 local government areas, including Olorunda, Ede South, Orolu, Osogbo, Odo Otin, Ifelodun, Boluwaduro, Atakumosa, and Ila.

In 2026, Adeleke contested in the 2026 Osun State gubernatorial election as the candidate of the Accord Party. The election was held on 15 August 2026, with Adeleke seeking re-election as governor.

On 16 August 2026, he was declared the winner by the Independent National Electoral Commission (INEC) after securing 511,067 votes. His closest challenger, All Progressives Congress candidate Bola Oyebamiji, received 444,815 votes. Adeleke won in 19 of the state's 30 local government area.

== Personal life ==
Adeleke is the husband of Titilola Adeleke, Erelu Abeni Adeleke and the father of eight children, including B-Red and Adenike Adeleke. He is also an uncle to musician, Davido.
