= Fatai Akinade Akinbade =

Nigerian politician (born 1955)

Alhaji Fatai Akinade Akinbade (born April 1955) is a Nigerian politician and the former Secretary to the State Government in Osun State. He was a contender to become the People's Democratic Party (PDP) candidate for governorship of Osun State in the April 2011 elections.

== Birth and education ==
Fatai Akinade Akinbade was born in April 1955 in Ogbaagbaa, a town in Ola-Oluwa Local Government Area. He is an Owu prince, thus making him an Omoba of the Yoruba people. Fatai's father was a drummer, and he was trained to follow that trade. He studied at St. James Anglican Primary School, Ogbaagba (1964–1969), then at Catholic Commercial Secondary Modern School, Iwo (1970–1973). Between 1973 and 1974 he worked as a pharmaceutical salesman in Lagos, before returning to study at Catholic Technical College, Ile-Ife (1975–1978). He qualified as a Civil Engineer.

== Early career ==
Akinbade was appointed a member of the board of Delta Steel Company in Aladja, Delta State, and was Chairman of the company's Finance and Multipurpose Committee. Akinbade joined the Osun State government, working for over sixteen years under three military administrators and then under the civilian governor Olagunsoye Oyinlola. In 2003, he was appointed Secretary to the state by Olagunsoye Oyinlola. In 2004, Fatai Akinbade was chosen as the leader of the Party in the Iwo Federal Constituency.

== Governorship candidacy bid ==
Akinbade announced his plan to run in the PDP primaries for state governor in February 2010. Eventually fourteen others announced their candidacy. In an interview in March 2010, he rejected the argument that it was the turn of Ife/Ijesha to present the next governor of the state. In June 2010, his bid was given public support by several traditional rulers in the Ife region of the state, including the Ooni of Ife, Oba Okunade Sijuwade. However, Akinbade's bid was opposed by party leadership. They directed all the state council chairmen to back Senator Iyiola Omisore, whose election as Senator for Osun East had been annulled in October 2009. The April 2011 election did not take place. In November 2010, the Federal Appeal Court, Ibadan declared that the April 2007 election of Olagunsoye Oyinlola was invalid, and in his place declared that Rauf Aregbesola of the Action Congress of Nigeria was the winner. Aregbesola was to serve for the next four years.
