= 2019 Osun State House of Assembly election =

State election in Nigeria

The 2019 Osun State House of Assembly election was held on 9 March 2019, to elect members of the Osun State House of Assembly in Nigeria. All 26 seats were up for election in the Osun State House of Assembly.

Timothy Owoeye from APC, representing Ilesha East constituency, was elected speaker, while Femi Popoola from APC, representing Boripe/Boluwaduro constituency, was elected deputy speaker.

== Results ==
The results of the election are listed below.

- Oriade constituency was won by Babatunde Ojo from APC.
- Ilesha West constituency was won by Wale Adedoyin from APC.
- Ilesha East constituency was won by Timothy Owoeye from APC.
- Atakumosa East/West constituency was won by Babatunde Komolafe from APC.
- Obokun constituency was won by Adewumi Adeyemi from PDP.
- Ife East constituency was won by Olajide Adeyeye from APC.
- Ife Central constituency was won by Taiwo Adebusola from APC.
- Ife North constituency was won by Tunde Olatunji from APC.
- Ife South constituency was won by Benjamin Ogundipe from APC.
- Osogbo constituency was won by Taofeek Badamosi from APC.
- Olorunda constituency was won by Kunle Akande from APC.
- Irepodun/Orolu constituency was won by Nasir Olateju from APC.
- Ifelodun constituency was won by Mulikat Abiola from APC.
- Odo Otin constituency was won by Michael Adetoyi from APC.
- Boripe/Boluwaduro constituency was won by Femi Popoola from APC.
- Ila constituency was won by Adebisi Jayeola from APC.
- Ifedayo constituency was won by Elizabeth Abioye from APC.
- Ayedire constituency was won by Gbenga Ogunkanmi from APC.
- Ola Oluwa constituency was won by Hadirullai Adegbile from APC.
- Iwo constituency was won by Halil Uzamot from APC.
- Ede North constituency was won by Babajide Kofoworola from PDP.
- Ede South constituency was won by Niran Atidade from PDP.
- Egbedore constituency was won by Babatunde Ibirogba from APC.
- Ejigbo constituency was won by Adekunle Oyekunle from APC.
- Irewole/Isokan constituency was won by Marouf Olanrewaju from APC.
- Ayedaade constituency was won by Taiwo Adebayo from APC.
