= Isokan =

- LGA
- Interactive map of Isokan
- Location in Nigeria
- Coordinates: 7°18′N 4°11′E
- Country: Nigeria
- State: Osun State
- Headquarter: Apomu

Government
  - Local Government Chairman and the Head of the Local Government Council: Odetunde Olagoke Micheal

Area
  - Total: 179 km^{2} (69 sq mi)

Population (2006 census)
  - Total: 103,177
  - Density: 576/km^{2} (1,490/sq mi)
- Time zone: UTC+1 (WAT)
- 3-digit postal code prefix: 221
- ISO 3166 code: NG.OS.IK

Isokan is a Local Government Area in Osun State, Nigeria. Its headquarters are in the town of Apomu at7°20′00″N 4°11′00″E. The current chairman of the council is Odetunde Olagoke Micheal.

It has an area of 179 km^{2} and a population of 103,177 at the 2006 census.

The postal code of the area is 221.

== Isokan South Local Council Development Area (LCDA) ==
Isokan South Local Council Development Area (LCDA) was created out of Isokan for administrative convenience, better development planning and to bring government closer to the grassroot. The LCDA is created by the Government of Osun State and is responsible for the funding of the council. The LCDA is headed by a chairman, vice chairman and other executive and legislative branches similar to the federally recognized local councils. The current chairman of the LCDA is Wasiu Oyetunji Oyelami.
