= Ife Central =

Ife Central Ile Ife
- LGA
- Interactive map of Ife Central
- Location in Nigeria
- Coordinates: 7°33′N 4°32′E
- Country: Nigeria
- State: Osun State
- Headquarter: Ife

Government
  - Local Government Chairman and the Head of the Local Government Council: Olayera Jacob Elugbaju

Area
  - Total: 111 km^{2} (43 sq mi)

Population (2006 census)
  - Total: 167,254
  - Density: 1,510/km^{2} (3,900/sq mi)
- Time zone: UTC+1 (WAT)
- 3-digit postal code prefix: 220
- ISO 3166 code: NG.OS.IC

Ife Central (Yoruba: Ife) is a Local Government Area in Osun State, Nigeria. Its headquarters are in the city of Ife to the south of the area. The current chairman of the council is Olayera Jacob Elugbaju.

It has an area of 111 km^{2} (43 sq mi) and a population of 167,254 at the 2006 census.

The postal code of the area is 220.

== Ife Central West Local Council Development Area (LCDA) ==
Ife Central West Local Council Development Area (LCDA) was created out of Ife Central council for administrative convenience, better development planning and to bring government closer to the grassroot. The LCDA is created by the Government of Osun State and is responsible for the funding of the council. The LCDA is headed by a chairman, vice chairman and other executive and legislative branches similar to the federally recognized local councils. The current chairman of the LCDA is Bisi Oladosu
