= Ife East =

- LGA
- Interactive map of Ife East
- Location in Nigeria
- Coordinates: 7°27′N 4°36′E
- Country: Nigeria
- State: Osun State
- Headquarter: Oke Ogbo

Government
  - Local Government Chairman and the Head of the Local Government Council: Akinwole Akinwale

Area
  - Total: 172 km^{2} (66 sq mi)

Population (2006 census)
  - Total: 188,087
  - Density: 1,090/km^{2} (2,830/sq mi)
- Time zone: UTC+1 (WAT)
- 3-digit postal code prefix: 220
- ISO 3166 code: NG.OS.IE

Ife East is a Local Government Area in Osun State, Nigeria. Its headquarters are in the town of Oke Ogbo. The current chairman of the council is Akinwole Akinwale.

It has an area of 172 km^{2} and a population of 188,087 at the 2006 census.

The postal code of the area is 220.

== Ife Ooye Local Council Development Area (LCDA) and Area Council Modakeke ==
Ife Ooye Local Council Development Area (LCDA) and Area Council Modakeke were created out of Ife East council area for administrative convenience, better development planning and to bring government closer to the grassroot. The LCDA is created by the Government of Osun State and is responsible for the funding of the council. The LCDA is headed by a chairman, vice chairman and other executive and legislative branches similar to the federally recognized local councils. The current chairmen are Egbetunde Ganiyu Mayowa (Ife Ooye LCDA) and Lawal Mojeed T (Area Council Modakeke).
