= Ife South =

- LGA
- Interactive map of Ife South
- Location in Nigeria
- Coordinates: 7°12′N 4°36′E
- Country: Nigeria
- State: Osun State
- Headquarter: Ifetedo

Government
  - Chairman: Adegbite Mufutau A.

Area
  - Total: 730 km^{2} (280 sq mi)

Population (2006 census)
  - Total: 135,338
  - Density: 190/km^{2} (480/sq mi)
- Time zone: UTC+1 (WAT)
- 3-digit postal code prefix: 220
- ISO 3166 code: NG.OS.IS

Ife South is a local government area in Osun State, Nigeria. Its headquarters are in the town of Ifetedo at 7°11′00″N 4°42′00″E.

It has an area of 730 km^{2} (280 sq mi) and its population was 135,338 at the 2006 census.

The postal code of the area is 220. The current chairman of the council is Adegbite Mufutau A.

== Ife South West Local Council Development Area (LCDA) ==
Ife South West Local Council Development Area (LCDA) was created out of Ife South administrative convenience, better development planning and to bring government closer to the grassroot. The LCDA is created by the Government of Osun State and is responsible for the funding of the council. The LCDA is headed by a chairman, vice chairman and other executive and legislative branches similar to the federally recognized local councils. Adebisi Yinusa is the current chairman of the LCDA.
