= Olorunda =

- LGA
- Interactive map of Olorunda
- Location in Nigeria
- Coordinates: 7°52′N 4°35′E
- Country: Nigeria
- State: Osun State
- Headquarter: Igbona

Government
  - Local Government Chairman: Mojeed Kunle Kudayisi

Area
  - Total: 97 km^{2} (37 sq mi)

Population (2006 census)
  - Total: 131,761
  - Density: 1,400/km^{2} (3,500/sq mi)
- Time zone: UTC+1 (WAT)
- 3-digit postal code prefix: 230
- ISO 3166 code: NG.OS.ON

Olorunda is a Local Government Area in Osun State, Nigeria. Its headquarters are located in Igbona, on the outskirts of Osogbo, the state capital. The current chairman of the council is Mojeed Kunle Kudayisi.

It covers an area of 97 km^{2} and had a population of 131,761 according to the 2006 census.

The area's postal code is 230.

== Olorunda North LCDA and Olorunda Area Council ==
Olorunda North Local Council Development Area (LCDA) and Olorunda Area Council were created out of Olorunda for administrative convenience, better development planning and to bring government closer to the grassroot. The LCDA is created by the Government of Osun State and is responsible for the funding of the council. The LCDA is headed by a chairman, vice chairman and other executive and legislative branches similar to the federally recognized local councils. The current chairman for Olorunda North LCDA is Mohammed Gazal Kazeem and the chairman for Olorunda Area Council is Omoloye Felicia Olayemi.
