= Ede North =

- LGA
- Interactive map of Ede North
- Location in Nigeria
- Coordinates: 7°44′N 4°29′E
- Country: Nigeria
- State: Osun State
- Headquarter: Abere

Government
  - Local Government Chairman and the Head of the Local Government Council: Adeyemi Elliot Sesan

Area
  - Total: 111 km^{2} (43 sq mi)

Population (2006 census)
  - Total: 83,831
  - Density: 755/km^{2} (1,960/sq mi)
- Time zone: UTC+1 (WAT)
- 3-digit postal code prefix: 232
- ISO 3166 code: NG.OS.EN

Ede North is a Local Government Area in Osun State, Nigeria. Its headquarters as Abere. The current chairman of the council is Adeyemi Elliot Sesan.

It has an area of 111 km^{2} and a population of 83,831 at the 2006 census.

The postal code of the area is 232.

== Ede North Area Council ==
Ede North Local Council Development Area was created out of Ede North for administrative convenience, better development planning and to bring government closer to the grassroot. The LCDA is created by the Government of Osun State and is responsible for the funding of the council. The LCDA is headed by a chairman, vice chairman and other executive and legislative branches similar to the federally recognized local councils. The current chairman of the council is Lawal N. Nureni.

== Climate ==
In Ede, the dry season is muggy and partially cloudy, and it is hot all year long. The wet season is oppressive and overcast. The average annual temperature ranges from 19 to 34 degrees Celsius (66 to 94 degrees Fahrenheit), rarely falling below 16 °C (60 °F) or rising over 37 °C (99 °F).

=== Ede North's Hot Temperature ===
Between January 22 and April 3, which is the length of the hot season, the daily maximum temperature averages over 33 °C (91 °F). In Ede, March is the warmest month of the year, with an average high of 34 °C (93 °F) and low of 23 °C (73 °F).

=== Ede North's Cool Temperature ===
The cool season lasts for 3.8 months, from June 15 to October 7, with an average daily high temperature below 29 °C (85 °F). The coldest month of the year in Ede is August, with an average low of 21 °C (70 °F) and high of 28 °C (82 °F).

=== Ede North's Clouds ===
In Ede, the average percentage of the sky covered by clouds experiences significant seasonal variation over the course of the year.

The clearer part of the year in Ede begins around November 18 and lasts for 2.9 months, ending around February 13.

December is the clearest month of the year in Ede, with the sky remaining clear, mostly clear, or partly cloudy 51% of the time on average.

Beginning about February 13 and lasting for 9.1 months, the cloudier period of the year ends with around November 18.

April is the cloudiest month of the year in Ede, with the sky being overcast or mostly cloudy 85% of the time on average.

=== Ede North's Precipitation ===
A day that has at least 0.04 inches of liquid or liquid-equivalent precipitation is considered to be wet. In Ede, the likelihood of rainy days fluctuates wildly throughout the year.

From April 9 to October 26 (the length of the wetter season), there is a greater than 43% chance that any particular day will be rainy. In Ede, September has an average of 24.9 days with at least 1.0 millimetre (0.04 inches) of precipitation, making it the month with the most wet days.

From October 26 to April 9, or 5.5 months, is the dry season. With an average of 1.3 days with at least 1.0 millimetre (0.04 inches) of precipitation, December is the month with the fewest wet days in Ede.

We categorize rainy days into those that only involve rain, those that only involve snow, and those that combine the two.With an average of 24.9 days, September is the month in Ede with the most rainy days. According to this classification, rain alone has a high probability of 84% on September 12 and is the most frequent type of precipitation throughout the year.
