= Boluwaduro =

- LGA
- Interactive map of Boluwaduro
- Location in Nigeria
- Coordinates: 7°54′N 4°49′E
- Country: Nigeria
- State: Osun State
- Headquarter: Otan

Government
  - Local Government Chairman and the Head of the Local Government Council: Bayo Oyekanmi

Area
  - Total: 144 km^{2} (56 sq mi)

Population (2006 census)
  - Total: 70,775
  - Density: 491/km^{2} (1,270/sq mi)
- Time zone: UTC+1 (WAT)
- 3-digit postal code prefix: 231
- ISO 3166 code: NG.OS.BL

Boluwaduro is a Local Government Area in Osun State, Nigeria. Its headquarters is in the town of Otan Aiyegbaju (or Otan for short) at7°57′00″N 4°48′00″E. It was created in October 1996 under late Gen. Abacha's regime. The current chairman of the Boluwaduro is Bayo Oyekanmi.

It has an area of 144 km^{2} and a population of 70,775 at the 2006 census.

The postal code of the area is 231.

== Boluwaduro East Local Council Development Area (LCDA) ==
Boluwaduro East Local Council Development Area (LCDA) was created out of Boluwaduro council for administrative convenience, better development planning and to bring government closer to the grassroot. The LCDA is created by the Government of Osun State and is responsible for the funding of the council. The LCDA is headed by a chairman, vice chairman and other executive and legislative branches similar to the federally recognized local councils. The current chairman of the LCDA is Samson O. Awodiji.
