= Atakunmosa West =

- LGA
- Interactive map of Atakunmosa West
- Location in Nigeria
- Coordinates: 7°33′N 4°40′E
- Country: Nigeria
- State: Osun State
- Headquarter: Osu

Government
  - Local Government Chairman and the Head of the Local Government Council: Dare Ajumobi Raphael

Area
  - Total: 577 km^{2} (223 sq mi)

Population (2006 census)
  - Total: 68,643
  - Density: 119/km^{2} (308/sq mi)
- Time zone: UTC+1 (WAT)
- 3-digit postal code prefix: 233
- ISO 3166 code: NG.OS.AW

Atakunmosa West is a Local Government Area in Osun State, Nigeria. Its headquarters are in the town of Osu (or Oshu) in the north of the area at7°35′00″N 4°37′00″E. Dare Ajumobi Raphael is the current chairman of the council.

It has an area of 577 km^{2} and a population of 68,643 at the 2006 census.

The postal code of the area is 233.

== Atakunmosa West Central Local Council Development Area (LCDA) ==
Atakunmosa West Central Local Council Development Area (LCDA) was created out Atakunmosa West for administrative convenience, better development planning and to bring government closer to the grassroot. The LCDA is created by the Government of Osun State and is responsible for the funding of the council. The LCDA is headed by a chairman, vice chairman and other executive and legislative branches similar to the federally recognized local councils. the current chairman of the LCDA is Olufemi Oyeleye.
