= Ilesa West =

- LGA
- Interactive map of Ilesa West
- Location in Nigeria
- Coordinates: 7°39′N 4°43′E
- Country: Nigeria
- State: Osun State
- Headquarter: Ilesha

Government
  - Local Government Chairman and the Head of the Local Government Council: Olabode Oluwasegun

Area
  - Total: 63 km^{2} (24 sq mi)

Population (2006 census)
  - Total: 103,555
- Time zone: UTC+1 (WAT)
- 3-digit postal code prefix: 233
- ISO 3166 code: NG.OS.IW

Ilesa West is a Local Government Area in Osun State, Nigeria. It is located at Omi Aladiye in the city of Ilesa. The current chairman of the council is Olabode Oluwasegun.

It has an area of 63 square kilometres (24 mi^{2}) and a population of 103,555 at the census of 2006.

The postal code of the area is 233.

== Ilesa West Central Local Council Development Area (LCDA) ==
Ilesa West Central Local Council Development Area (LCDA) was created out of Ilesa West for administrative convenience, better development planning and to bring government closer to the grassroot. The LCDA is created by the Government of Osun State and is responsible for the funding of the council. The LCDA is headed by a chairman, vice chairman and other executive and legislative branches similar to the federally recognized local councils. Tobiloba T. Famurewa is the current chairman of the council.
