= Atakunmosa East =

- LGA
- Interactive map of Atakunmosa East
- Location in Nigeria
- Coordinates: 7°29′N 4°47′E
- Country: Nigeria
- State: Osun State
- Headquarter: Iperindo

Government
  - Local Government Chairman and the Head of the Local Government Council: Folusho Adekoya

Area
  - Total: 238 km^{2} (92 sq mi)

Population (2006 census)
  - Total: 76,197
  - Density: 320/km^{2} (829/sq mi)
- Time zone: UTC+1 (WAT)
- 3-digit postal code prefix: 233
- ISO 3166 code: NG.OS.AE

Atakunmosa East (Yoruba: Ìláòrún Àtákunmósà) is a Local Government Area in Osun State, Nigeria. Its headquarters are in the town of Iperindo in the east of the area at7°30′00″N 4°49′00″E. Folusho Adekoya is the current chairman of the council.

It has an area of 238 km^{2} and a population of 76,197 at the 2006 census.

The postal code of the area is 233.

== Atakunmosa East Central Local Council Development Area (LCDA) ==
Atakunmosa East Central Local Council Development Area (LCDA) was created out of Atakunmosa East area council for administrative convenience, better development planning and to bring government closer to the grassroot. The LCDA was created by the Government of Osun State and is responsible for the funding of the council. The LCDA is headed by a chairman, vice chairman and other executive and legislative branches similar to the federally recognized local councils. The current chairman of the LCDA is Adediran Mercy Olusola.
