= Ilesa East =

- LGA
- Interactive map of Ilesa East
- Location in Nigeria
- Coordinates: 7°37′N 4°46′E
- Country: Nigeria
- State: Osun State
- Headquarter: Iyemogun

Government
  - Local Government Chairman: Olanrewaju Balogun

Area
  - Total: 71 km^{2} (27 sq mi)

Population (2006 census)
  - Total: 106,586
  - Density: 1,500/km^{2} (3,900/sq mi)
- Time zone: UTC+1 (WAT)
- 3-digit postal code prefix: 233
- ISO 3166 code: NG.OS.IH

Ilesa East is a Local Government Area in Osun State, Nigeria. Its headquarters are in Iyemogun in the city of Ilesa. The current chairman of the council is Olanrewaju Balogun.

It has an area of 71 km^{2} and a population of 106,586 at the 2006 census.

The postal code of the area is 233.

== Ilesa North East Local Council Development Area (LCDA) ==
Ilesa North East Local Council Development Area (LCDA) was created out of Ilesa East council area for administrative convenience, better development planning and to bring government closer to the grassroot. The LCDA is created by the Government of Osun State and is responsible for the funding of the council. The LCDA is headed by a chairman, vice chairman and other executive and legislative branches similar to the federally recognized local councils. The current chairman of the LCDA is Omoniyi Oluwagbenga.
