= Orolu =

- LGA
- Interactive map of Orolu
- Location in Nigeria
- Coordinates: 7°54′N 4°27′E
- Country: Nigeria
- State: Osun State
- Headquarter: Ifon

Government
  - Local Government Chairman: Abolade Nureni Adekunle

Area
  - Total: 80 km^{2} (31 sq mi)

Population (2006 census)
  - Total: 103,077
  - Density: 1,300/km^{2} (3,300/sq mi)
- Time zone: UTC+1 (WAT)
- 3-digit postal code prefix: 230
- ISO 3166 code: NG.OS.OR

Orolu is a Local Government Area in Osun State, Nigeria. Its headquarters are in the town of Ifon (or Ifon Osun) at7°52′00″N 4°29′00″E. The current chairman of the council is Abolade Nureni Adekunle.

It has an area of 80 km^{2} and a population of 103,077 at the 2006 census.

The postal code of the area is 230.

== Orolu Area Council ==
Orolu Area Council was created out of Orolu for administrative convenience, better development planning and to bring government closer to the grassroot. The LCDA is created by the Government of Osun State and is responsible for the funding of the council. The LCDA is headed by a chairman, vice chairman and other executive and legislative branches similar to the federally recognized local councils. The current chairman of the council is Oladejo Kazeem A.
