= Gboyega Oyetola =

Nigerian politician (born 1954)

Gboyega Oyetola CON
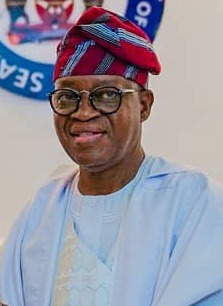

Minister of Marine and Blue Economy
- Incumbent
- Assumed office 21 August 2023
- President: Bola Tinubu
- Preceded by: position established

Governor of Osun State
- In office 27 November 2018 – 27 November 2022
- Deputy: Benedict Alabi
- Preceded by: Rauf Aregbesola
- Succeeded by: Ademola Adeleke

Chief of Staff to the Governor of Osun State
- In office 2011–2018
- Governor: Rauf Aregbesola

Personal details
- Born: Adegboyega Isiaka Oyetola; 29 September 1954 (age 72) Iragbiji, Southern Region, British Nigeria (now in Osun State, Nigeria)
- Party: All Progressives Congress (2013–present)
- Other political affiliations: Alliance for Democracy (1998–2006); Action Congress of Nigeria (2006–2013)
- Spouse: Kafayat Oyetola
- Children: 4
- Education: University of Lagos
- Occupation: Politician

Adegboyega Isiaka Oyetola CON (born 29 September 1954) is a Nigerian politician who is the current minister of Marine and Blue Economy. He served as governor of Osun State from 2018 to 2022.

He contested for the Osun State gubernatorial seat on the platform of the All Progressives Congress (APC) in the September 2018 gubernatorial election and won. On 23 March 2019, a tribunal declared him to have not been legally returned and ordered INEC to issue certificates of return to Senator Ademola Adeleke of the PDP, which was contested at the Court of Appeal. Before he won the election, he was the Chief of Staff to his predecessor, Rauf Aregbesola.

He was appointed minister of transportation by President Bola Tinubu on 16 August 2023, but redeployed four days later to the newly created Ministry of Marine and Blue Economy.

== Early life and education ==
Adegboyega Oyetola was born in Iragbiji, Boripe Local Government Area of present day Osun State on 29 September 1954. He started his secondary education at Ifeoluwa Grammar School, Osogbo and graduated in 1972.

Oyetola proceeded to the University of Lagos and graduated with a Bachelor of Science honours degree in Insurance in 1978. He proceeded for his mandatory one year National Youth Service Corps in Potiskum, Yobe State, where he lectured at the Staff Training Centre between 1978 and 1979. He obtained his Master of Business Administration (MBA) from the University of Lagos in 1990.

== Career ==
In 1980, Oyetola joined Leadway Assurance Company Limited as an area manager and worked there till 1987 when he moved on to join Crusader Insurance Company Limited as Underwriting Manager between 1987 and 1990. In 1990, he joined Alliance and General Insurance as Technical Controller and served in that capacity until 1991 when he left the organisation to start his own company, Silvertrust Insurance Brokers Limited. He was managing director since its founding until 2011 when he was appointed as Chief of Staff to the Osun State Governor, Rauf Aregbesola.

Oyetola also served as Executive Vice Chairman, Paragon Group of Companies between 2005 and 2011. He was also Chairman of Ebony Properties Limited. He had been a Director of Pyramid Securities Limited, until 2011, He is an Associate Member, Chartered Insurance Institute in London and Nigeria. He is also a member of the Nigerian Institute of Management (NIM).

Oyetola was a member of the Alliance for Democracy (AD), and has been in the party through its metamorphosis to Action Congress (AC), Action Congress of Nigeria (ACN) and now the All Progressives Congress (APC). In July 2018, he contested with Osun state House of Representatives deputy speaker Yusuf Lasun and Speaker of Osun State House of Assembly Rt. Hon. Najeem Folasayomi Salaam, Dr Samuel Ibiyemi; Publisher Nigerian News Direct Newspapers, Adelere Oriolowo, Moshood Adeoti amongst others for the All Progressives Congress gubernatorial candidacy of the 22 September 2018 gubernatorial election in Osun state and won. He was sworn in to office on 27 November 2018. On 22 March 2019, the election tribunal sitting in Abuja declared that the All Progressive Congress and its candidate, Gboyega Oyetola, were not validly returned. On 2 August 2023, he alongside 18 others was announced as ministerial-nominees by President Bola Tinubu.

== Pandora Papers revelations ==
As a result of the Pandora Papers leaks, the Premium Times reported on Oyetola's undisclosed acquisition of a London mansion from an international fugitive wanted for money laundering, Kola Aluko. The report revealed that an Oyetola-formed offshore company based in the British Virgin Islands, a known tax haven, had bought the house from another British Virgin Islands-based offshore company that was formed by Aluko right before Nigerian authorities were attempting to freeze Aluko's assets. The selling price, £9 million, was much lower than the £17 million that the house was judged to be worth by the Premium Times. Notably, this house is the residence of Bola Tinubu as he is in London for medical treatment.

== Personal life ==
He is married to Kafayat Oyetola, they met in Kaduna while she was on a visit. They got married years later and have four children; three daughters and a son.
