= Ede South =

Ede South Ede
- LGA
- Interactive map of Ede South
- Location in Nigeria
- Coordinates: 7°42′N 4°27′E
- Country: Nigeria
- State: Osun State
- Headquarter: Ede

Government
  - Timi: HRH Oba Munirudeen Adesola Lawal (Laminisa I)
  - Chairman: Kola Salami

Area
  - Total: 219 km^{2} (85 sq mi)

Population (2006 census)
  - Total: 76,035
  - Density: 347/km^{2} (899/sq mi)
- Time zone: UTC+1 (WAT)
- 3-digit postal code prefix: 232
- ISO 3166 code: NG.OS.ES

Ede South is a Local Government Area in Osun State, Nigeria. Its headquarters are in the town of Ede. The current chairman of the council is Kola Salami.

It has an area of 219 km^{2} and a population of 76,035 at the 2006 census.

The postal code of the area is 232.

== Ede South East Local Council Development Area (LCDA) ==
Ede South East Local Council Development Area (LCDA) was created out of Ede South local council for administrative convenience, better development planning and to bring government closer to the grassroot. The LCDA is created by the Government of Osun State and is responsible for the funding of the council. The LCDA is headed by a chairman, vice chairman and other executive and legislative branches similar to the federally recognized local councils. The current chairman of the LCDA is Fatai Olaleye Salawu.
