= 1822 in the United Kingdom =

Events from the year 1822 in the United Kingdom.

== Incumbents ==
- Monarch – George IV
- Prime Minister – Robert Jenkinson, 2nd Earl of Liverpool (Tory)
- Foreign Secretary – Robert Stewart, 2nd Marquess of Londonderry (until 18 August) George Canning (from 13 September)
- Home Secretary – Lord Sidmouth (until 17 January) Robert Peel (from 17 January)
- Secretary of War – Lord Bathurst

== Events ==
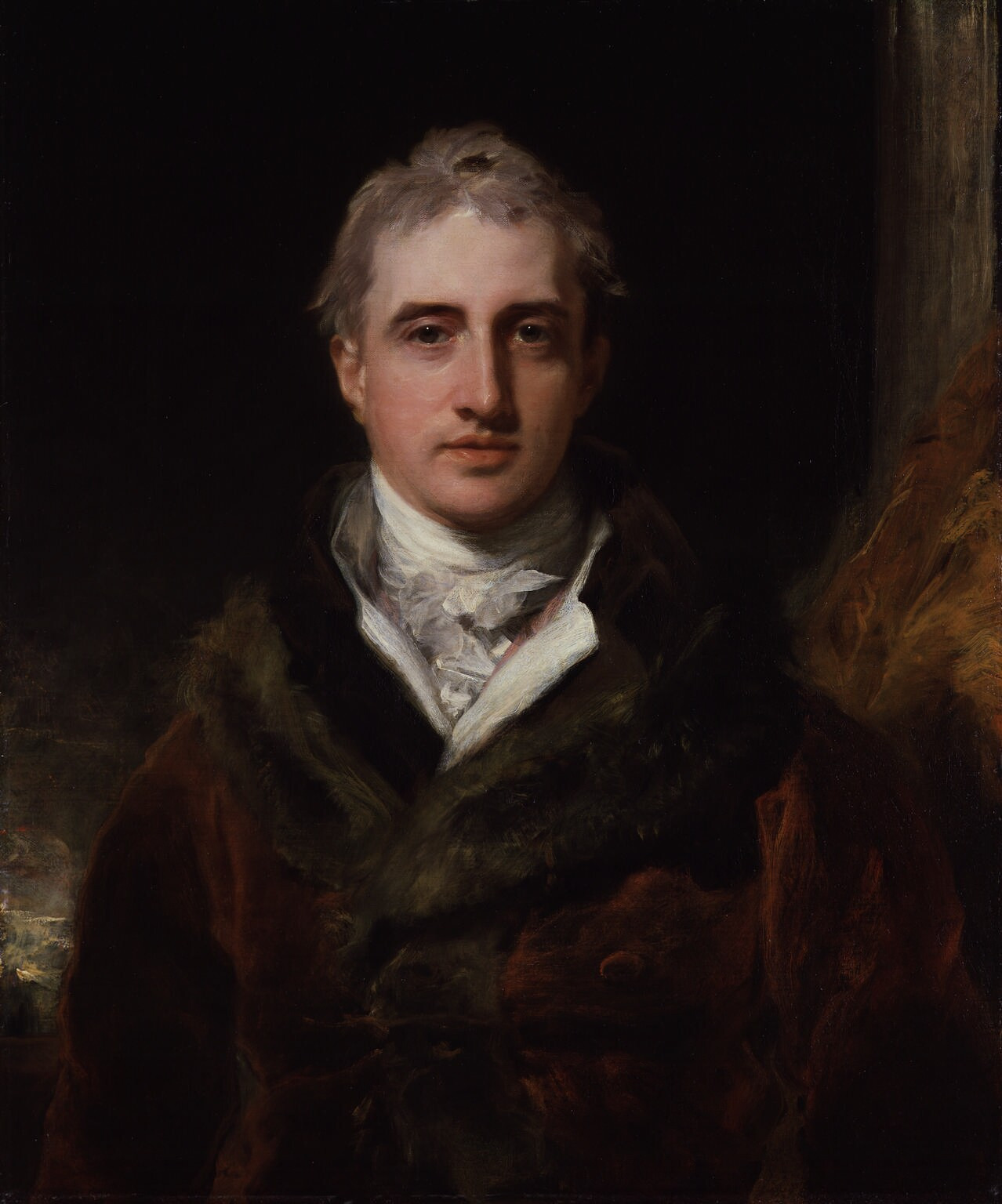
Portrait of Lord Castlereagh by Thomas Lawrence.

- 3 January – Seaton Delaval Hall in Northumberland is gutted by fire.
- 15 January – HM Treasury directs that the Preventive Water Guard, Revenue cruisers and Riding officers should all be placed under the authority of the Board of Customs as HM Coast Guard.
- 6 May – The Royal Academy Exhibition of 1822 opens at Somerset House. The exhibition is noted for portraits by Thomas Lawrence and David Wilkie's Chelsea Pensioners Reading the Waterloo Dispatch
- 23 May – HMS Comet launched at Deptford Dockyard, the first steamboat commissioned by the Royal Navy.
- 18 June – The Wellington Monument is inaugurated close to the Duke's London residence Apsley House on the seventh anniversary of his victory at Waterloo.
- 3 July – Charles Babbage publishes a proposal for a "difference engine", a mechanical forerunner of the modern computer for calculating logarithms and trigonometric functions. Construction of an operational version will proceed under Government sponsorship 1823–32 but it will never be completed.
- 8 July – The Chippewa turn over a huge tract of land in Ontario to the British.
- 19 July – Percy Jocelyn, Anglican Bishop of Clogher, is caught in a compromising position with a young Grenadier Guardsman at a public house in London. He breaks bail and flees England. In October, an ecclesiastical court deprives him of office.
- 22 July – An Act to Prevent the Cruel and Improper Treatment of Cattle ("Martin's Act"), one of the first pieces of animal rights legislation, is passed to regulate treatment of cows, horses and sheep.
- 31 July – Last public whipping in Edinburgh.
- 12 August
  - The Foreign Secretary Lord Castlereagh cuts his own throat at his house in Kent.
  - St David's College (the modern-day University of Wales, Lampeter) is founded by Thomas Burgess, Bishop of St David's.
- 15–29 August – Visit of King George IV to Scotland, first appearance of the monarch there since 1651.
- 22 August – English ship Orion lands at Yerba Buena, later named San Francisco, under the command of William A. Richardson
- 16 September – George Canning is appointed Foreign Secretary to replace Castlereagh.
- 21 September – HMS Confiance, a Royal Navy Cruizer-class brig-sloop of 1813, is wrecked off Mizen Head in Ireland with the loss of all 100 aboard.
- 24 September – The Prime Minister, Lord Liverpool, marries, as his second wife, Mary Chester, at Hampton Court.
- 20 October
  - The New Observer newspaper becomes The Sunday Times.
  - The Duke of Wellington represents Britain at the Congress of Verona.
- 23–24 October – The Caledonian Canal, engineered by Thomas Telford, is opened throughout, linking the east and west coasts of Scotland through the Great Glen.
- 27 November – Outside Newgate Prison in London, William Reading becomes the last person to be hanged for shoplifting.

=== Undated ===
- Egyptian hieroglyphs are deciphered by Thomas Young and Jean-François Champollion using the Rosetta Stone.
- A fossil Iguanodon tooth is discovered by Gideon Mantell and his wife Mary in West Sussex; in 1825 it will be the first fossil to be recognised as that of a dinosaur.
- The Royal Academy of Music is founded in London. It opens in March 1823 before the Royal charter is granted in June 1830.
- Construction of the Royal Pavilion in Brighton is completed.
- Stonemason John Mowlem establishes the contracting firm Mowlem.

== Publications ==
- Alexander Jamieson's A Celestial Atlas.
- John C. Loudon's The Encyclopædia of Gardening.
- Sir Walter Scott's novels The Pirate and The Fortunes of Nigel.

== Births ==
- 10 February – Eliza Lynn Linton, English novelist and journalist (died 1898)
- 13 February – James B. Beck, Scottish-born United States Senator from Kentucky from 1877 to 1890 (died 1890 in the United States)
- 16 February – Sir Francis Galton, English explorer and biologist (died 1911)
- 8 April – Stillborn twin sons to the Duke of Clarence and Adelaide of Saxe-Meiningen
- 19 April – Edward Oxford, English attempted assassin of Queen Victoria (died 1900)
- 18 July – Augusta of Cambridge, Hanoverian princess (died 1916)
- 1 November – Sir Sydney Waterlow, English businessman, politician and philanthropist (died 1906)
- 6 December – Mary Colton, Australian philanthropist and suffragist (died 1898)
- 24 December – Matthew Arnold, English poet (died 1888)

== Deaths ==
- 15 January – John Aikin, physician and writer (born 1747)
- 24 February – Thomas Coutts, banker (born 1735)
- 8 March – Christopher Wyvill, cleric, landowner and political reformer (born 1740)
- 17 June – Marquess of Hertford, politician and courtier (born 1743)
- 8 July – Percy Bysshe Shelley, poet (born 1792)
- 23 July – Peter Durand, merchant (born 1766)
- 12 August – Robert Stewart, Viscount Castlereagh, Foreign Secretary (suicide) (born 1769)
- 25 August – William Herschel, astronomer (born 1738 in Hanover)
