= Lagos State Ferry Services Corporation =

Ferry operator in Nigeria

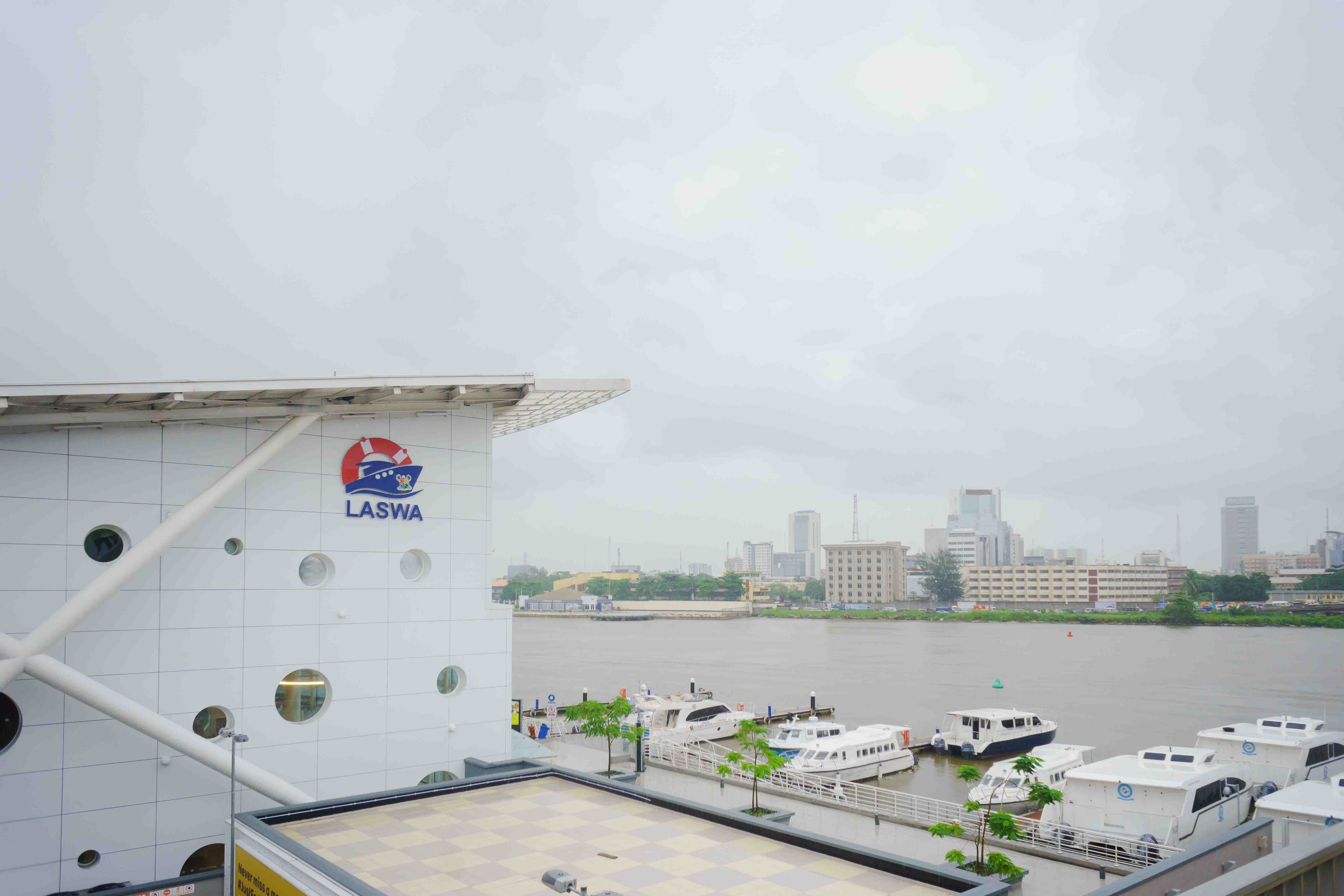
Lagos State Waterways Authority building, Ikoyi, Lagos

The Lagos State Ferry Services Corporation (LSFSC) or Lagos Ferry Services Company (also known as Lagferry) is a ferry services provider in Lagos State. It was established in 1983.

Lagferry works in conjunction with Lagos State Waterways Authority, National Inland Waterways Authority and Nigeria Maritime Administration and Safety Agency. Besides Lagferry, other private ferry operators also use modern ferry boats to provide commercial transport services between Ikorodu, Lagos Island, Apapa and Victoria Island.
