= Dolphin Swimming League =

Swimming school in Lagos, Nigeria

Dolphin Swimming League is a swimming school located in Lagos state, Nigeria. It is certified by the Nigeria Aquatics Federation and their activities are endorsed by the Lagos State Sports Commission. The swimming league organize inter-school tournaments in lagos state grooming the young ones ahead of international games such as Olympics

== Partnerships ==
In 2023, The swimming league hosted a tournament for 11 private schools organised by Dynaspro Promotion Limited in partnership with Lagos State Swimming Association, Advanta Interactive Limited and Nigeria Aquatics Federation.

She partnered with the Lagos State Waterways Authority to engage 50 students across public schools in Bariga and Shomolu local government in water safety classes and swimming lessons in September, 2024.

== Tournaments ==
The season 5 of the first private school swimming league endorsed by the Nigeria Olympic Committee was held in 2023 with Grange School, Meadow Hall, St Saviour's Children International School, Lagos Preparatory and Secondary School, Lagoon/Whitesands, Greensprings Lagos, Riverbank and Italian Priory, as participating schools and club.

The final grande of the tournament was held at Children International School (CIS) in Lekki, Lagos. The partners for the league include Nigeria School Sports Federation (NSSF), Rite Foods and Nigeria Aquatic Federation.
