= Lekan Fatodu =

Nigerian Journalist

Olalekan Fatodu
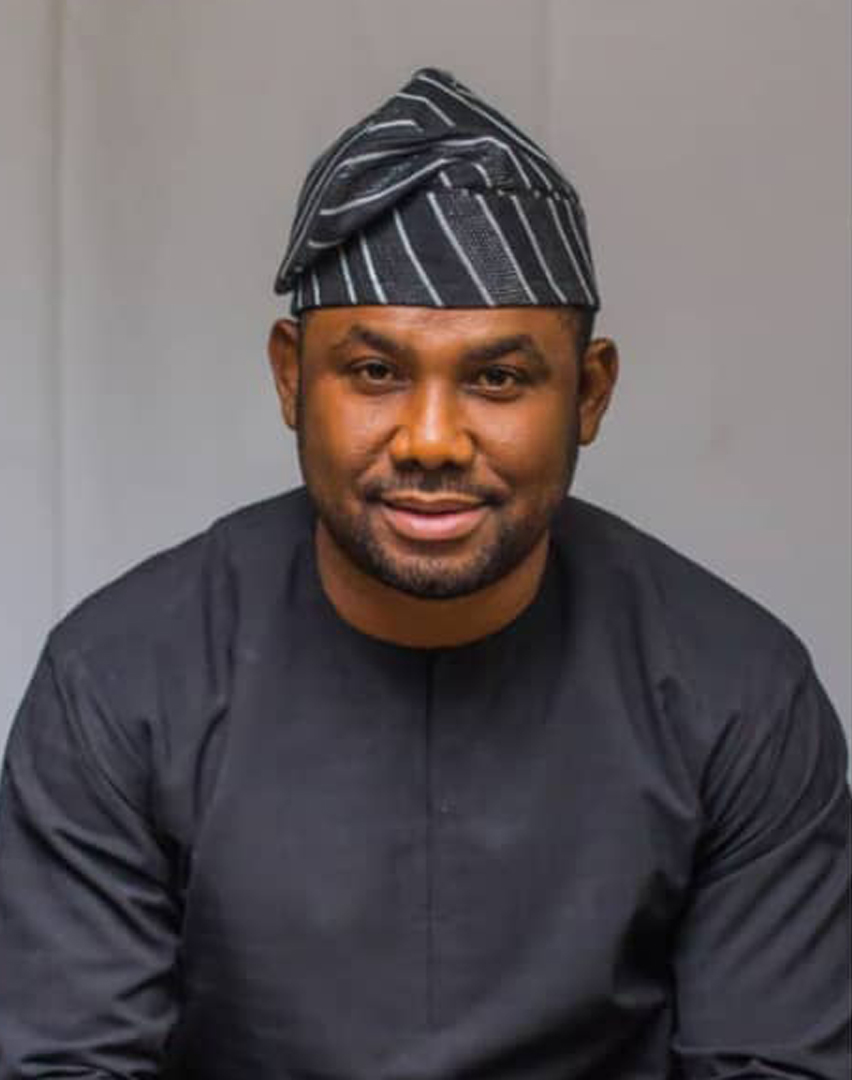

Director General of the Lagos State Sports Commission
- Incumbent
- Assumed office 2 February 2024
- Preceded by: Oluwatoyin Gafaar Bolowota

SSA on SDGs to Governor of Lagos State
- In office 5 June 2020 – 29 May 2023

Personal details
- Born: Lagos
- Citizenship: Nigerian
- Party: All Progressives Congress
- Education: University of Lagos
- Occupation: Journalist, Development Practitioner
- Known for: Publisher Checkout Magazine
- Website: www.checkoutmagazine.com

Olalekan Fatodu is a Nigerian journalist, public relations expert and development practitioner. He is the current Director General of the Lagos State Sports Commission (LSSC). Lekan previously served as the Senior Special Assistant on Sustainable Development Goals (SDGs) to the Governor of Lagos State, Babajide Sanwo-Olu from 2020 to 2023.

== Early life and education ==
Lekan was born and bred in Lagos, a state in the south-west geopolitical zone of Nigeria. He had his primary, secondary and tertiary education in Lagos, where he earned a Bachelor of Science degree in Mass Communication from the University of Lagos. Shortly afterward, he proceeded to the United Kingdom where he earned a Master's degree in Diplomatic Studies from the University of Westminster. Lekan is a PRINCE2 certified project management practitioner.

== Professional career and Public office ==
Governor Babajide Sanwo-Olu appointed Lekan Fatodu as the Director General of the Lagos State Sports Commission on 2 February 2024. A move aimed at repositioning the sports sector in the state and unlocking the inherent talents of its vibrant population for economic growth and development.

Before assuming the position of Director General at the Lagos State Sports Commission, Lekan held the esteemed role of Senior Special Assistant on Sustainable Development Goals (SDG's) to the Governor of Lagos State, Babajide Sanwo-Olu. Preceding this, he demonstrated versatility by concurrently serving as the publisher of Checkout Magazine, a publication focusing on business and development, and as the lead consultant at Leeman Communication - a Nigeria-based firm specializing in development and strategic communications.
