= National Inland Waterways Authority =

Nigerian government agency

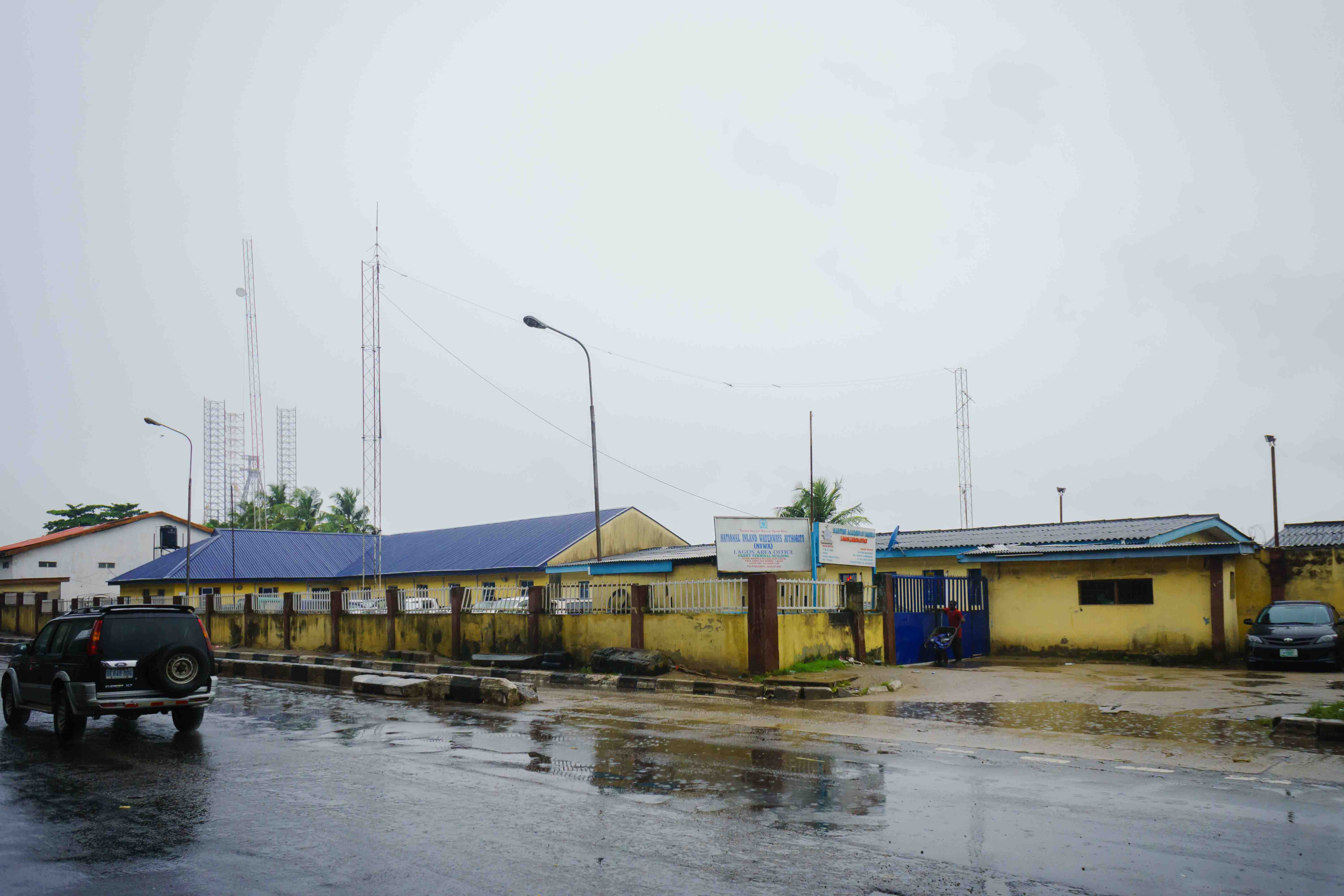
National Inland waterways authority, Outer Marina, CMS, Lagos Nigeria

National Inland Waterways Authority (also known as NIWA) is the authorised agency in charge of inland water regulation in Nigeria. Munirudeen Bola Oyebamiji is the managing director of NIWA. The agency works alongside other water regulating bodies such as Lagos State Waterways Authority (LASWA), Nigerian Shippers' Council (NSC), and Waterways Assets Development Services (WADS) Limited to ensure safety protection of boats, ferries and their crews, as well as maintenance of water body. They are also responsible for sanctioning the illegal operations in inland waterways.

== History ==
In 2020, due to the COVID-19 pandemic, the NIWA and LASWA agencies issued a directive that allows full capacity for four-stroke engine boats and limits to 75% capacity for two-stroke engine boats. In 2024, the Senate commissioned the approval of 12 fibre-reinforced plastic boats and three water ambulances at the National Inland Waterways Authority (NIWA) headquarters in Lokoja, Kogi state.

== Operations ==
Through its Lagos branch led by Sarat Lara Braimah, NIWA cleared the hyacinth vegetation in the swampy area that clogged water channels in Ebute area of Ikorodu in 2023.

NIWA collaborated with Nigerian Immigration Service (NIS) to stop the illegal waterways immigration, especially from Marina jetty to Badagry and Port Novo, which often leads to human trafficking.

In 2024, through managing director Bola Oyebamiji, NIWA proposed the dredging of the 2000 km navigable waterways and the completion of Jamaja Inland Port in Lokoja while seeking funds from the Minister of Blue Marine and Economy, Adegboyega Oyetola.

== Controversies ==
NIWA was declared the authorised agency in charge of inland Waterways operation by the supreme court in early January 2024 following a battle between the Lagos State Government and the Federal Government over the ownership of the waterways operation in Nigeria.

In Late September 2024, NIWA filed a lawsuit against Shell Development Company over a 4 billion naira debt for the passage of its crude oil products through NIWA's pipeline after failure to reach agreement as regards the payment.
