= Nigeria Aquatics Federation =

Sports governing body in Nigeria

Nigeria Aquatic Federation is the authorised body regulating swimming activities in Nigeria. The body was headed by Babatunde Fatai-Williams in 2018 and Chinoye Daphey Aliyu was elected as the first female president in 2023. The water body regulating authority is responsible for making water bodies safe for swimming and train Nigerian Swimmers to compete in International games.

== Activities ==
The Nigeria Aquatic Federation hosted the 2nd Africa Junior Swimming Championships held between October 27 and 29, 2017.

In 2019, All Schools National Swimming Competition (ASNSC) was organized by the Nigerian Aquatic federation in collaboration with RealWorth Consult, a national swimming competition across the 36 states of Nigeria.

The aquatic Federation is one of the members of the Nigerian Sport Federations Caretakers committee appointed by The Minister of Youth and Sports Development, Sunday Dare Friday following the dissolution of the boards of 31 National Sports Federations in 2021.

In 2022, The Nigeria Aquatic Federation (NAF) organized a two-day training event for its coaches and life guards to further upgrade swimming activities in Nigeria.

The aquatic federation ranked the 31st position at the World Aquatic Championship in Fukuoka, Japan held in 2023.

== See also ==
- Dolphin Swimming League
