= HM Coastguard =

National maritime rescue service covering the United Kingdom

His Majesty's Coastguard

- Ensign

Coast Guard overview
- Formed: 15 January 1822
- Headquarters: Southampton, England, UK
- Motto: To search, to rescue, to save
- Annual budget: £372 million (2021)
- Ministers responsible: Heidi Alexander, Secretary of State for Transport; Keir Mather, Parliamentary Under-Secretary of State for Aviation, Maritime and Decarbonisation
- Coast Guard executives: Virginia McVea, Chief Executive (Maritime and Coastguard Agency); Claire Hughes, Director of HM Coastguard; Lars Lippuner, Director of UK Customer Maritime Services; Charles III, Honorary Commodore
- Parent Coast Guard: Maritime and Coastguard Agency
- Website: hmcoastguard.uk

His Majesty's Coastguard (HM Coastguard or HMCG) is the section of the Maritime and Coastguard Agency responsible, through the Secretary of State for Transport to Parliament, for the initiation and co-ordination of all maritime search and rescue (SAR) within the UK Maritime Search and Rescue Region. This includes the mobilisation, organisation and tasking of adequate resources to respond to persons either in distress at sea, or to persons at risk of injury or death on the cliffs or shoreline of the United Kingdom. Since 2015 it has also been responsible for land-based search and rescue helicopter operations.

The chief executive of the Maritime and Coastguard Agency is Virginia McVea.

His Majesty's Coastguard is a uniformed service that fulfils six of the nine functions required by the International Maritime Organization (IMO):

- Search and Rescue
- Pollution Response
- Vessel Traffic Management
- Maritime Safety
- Accident and Disaster Response
- Maritime Security

The other three IMO functions; Customs/Border Control, Fisheries Control and Law Enforcement, are undertaken by the UK Border Force, Marine Management Organisation and local police forces, respectively. The maintenance of seamarks is the responsibility of Trinity House (in England and Wales), the Northern Lighthouse Board (in Scotland) and the Commissioners of Irish Lights (in Northern Ireland). HM Coastguard is a civilian agency, unlike other coastguard services around the world, as the duties traditionally associated with a military coastguard service are spread around the UK Civil Service and British Armed Forces. It is a Category 1 emergency responder alongside the United Kingdom's regional police, fire, and ambulance services as defined by the Civil Contingencies Act 2004.

Lifeboat services are provided by the Royal National Lifeboat Institution, or other independent lifeboat stations not affiliated with the RNLI, all under the coordination of the Coastguard. The Maritime and Coastguard Agency wet leases commercial aircraft for HM Coastguard operations – Sikorsky S-92s, AgustaWestland AW189s, and AgustaWestland AW139s – to provide aerial search and rescue coverage around Great Britain and Northern Ireland. HM Coastguard can similarly utilise a range of fixed-wing aircraft such as the Beechcraft King Air, Diamond DA-62, and Piper PA-31 Navajo in reconnaissance, surveillance, and counter-pollution roles. Aeronautical assets are coordinated through the Joint Rescue Coordination Centre based in Fareham, Hampshire, as and when requested by the regional Rescue Coordination Centres. An ocean-going emergency towing vehicle is also operated in areas not served by tug brokers. On the coastline, HM Coastguard maintains a network of cliff and mud rescue teams, composed of around 4,000 volunteers, and can call upon the National Coastwatch Institution which staffs many former Coastguard lookout stations around the coast. It is part of the Maritime and Coastguard Agency, which in itself is an executive agency of the Department for Transport.

== History ==
HM Coastguard was established in 1822. In 1809 the Preventive Water Guard was established, which may be regarded as the immediate ancestor of HM Coastguard. Its primary objective was to prevent smuggling, but it was also responsible for giving assistance to shipwrecks. For this reason, each Water Guard station was issued with Manby's Mortar (the mortar fired a shot with a line attached from the shore to the wrecked ship and was used for many years). In 1821 a committee of inquiry recommended that responsibility for the Preventive Water Guard should be transferred from HM Treasury to the Board of Customs. The Board of Custom and the Board of Excise each had their own long-established preventive forces: shore-based Riding Officers and sea-going Revenue Cruisers. The committee recommended the consolidation of these various related services. The Treasury agreed, and in a Minute dated 15 January 1822 directed that they be placed under the authority of the Board of Customs and named the Coast Guard.

The new Coast Guard inherited a number of shore stations and watch houses from its predecessor bodies as well as several coastal vessels, and these provided bases for its operations over the following years. In 1829 the first Coast Guard instructions were published, dealing mainly with discipline and the prevention of smuggling; they also stipulated that when a wreck took place the Coast Guard was responsible for taking all possible action to save lives, taking charge of the vessel and protecting property. In 1831, the Coast Guard took over duties from the Coast Blockade for the Suppression of Smuggling (which had been run by the Admiralty from a string of Martello Towers on the Kent and Sussex coast); this finally gave it authority over the whole of the UK coastline.

In the 1850s, with smuggling on the wane, oversight of the Coast Guard was transferred from the Board of Customs to the Admiralty. In the decades that followed, the Coast Guard (or Coastguard, as it came to be called) began to function more like an auxiliary Naval service, a recruitment ground for future naval personnel. Responsibilities for revenue protection were retained, but hands-on rescue services began to be undertaken more and more by Volunteer Life Brigades and by the lifeboats of the RNLI, with the Coast Guard acting in a support role.

By the start of the twentieth century, there was a growing sense of dissatisfaction with the service expressed both by the Board of Customs (concerned for revenue protection) and by the Board of Trade (responsible for safety at sea). In the wake of the First World War, moves were made to address these deficiencies. In 1923 the Coastguard was re-established as a coastal safety and rescue service, overseen by the Board of Trade. Its skills in maritime communication (acquired during the Admiralty years, when Coastguard officers often manned signal stations) were recognised, with provision being made for the use of new communication technologies for safety at sea. There was also a renewed determination to recruit, train and co-ordinate volunteer rescue personnel with the establishment in 1931 of a Coastal Life-saving Corps, later renamed the Coastguard Auxiliary Service (see Coastguard Rescue Service, below).

For the rest of the twentieth century, the Coastguard continued to operate primarily out of local shore stations (use of ships had declined after 1923). In 1931 in England there were 193 stations and 339 auxiliary stations; in 1974 there were still 127 stations (permanently manned) and 245 auxiliary stations. From the 1960s onwards, though, priorities were changing from maintaining coastal lookouts to provision of co-ordinated search and rescue services. Old watch houses, with their on-site accommodation and annexed boathouses, gave way to new technology-based Maritime Rescue Co-ordination Centres, far fewer in number. Efficiency drives in the 1990s made Her Majesty's Coastguard a government executive agency, then in 1998 the Marine Safety Agency and the Coastguard Agency were joined to become the Maritime and Coastguard Agency (MCA).

== The Coastguard Rescue Service ==
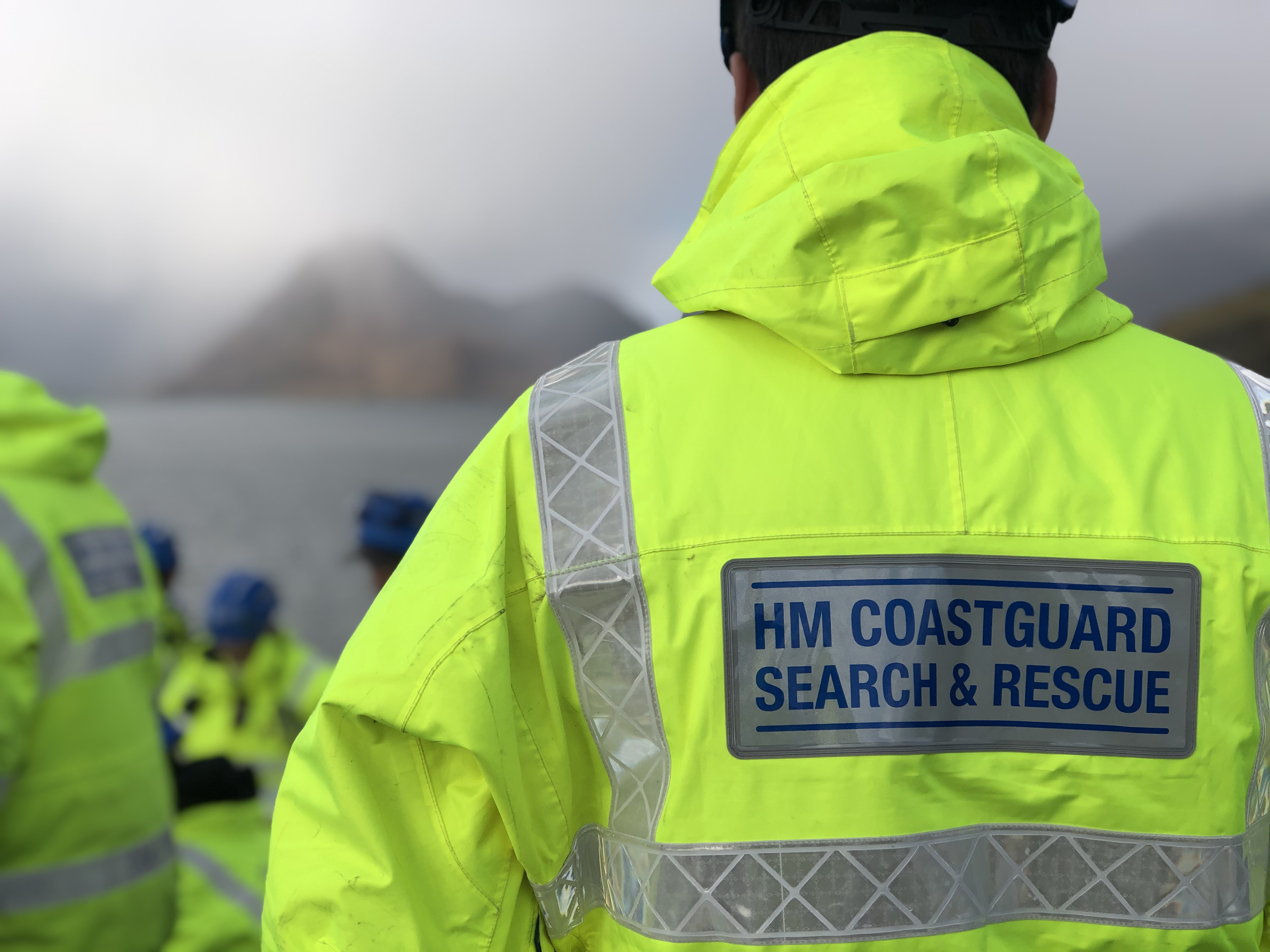
HM Coastguard volunteer on Skye, Scotland

The Coastguard Rescue Service is made up of 352 teams located near the coast in stations around the UK, with the most coastal rescue stations in the UK. The teams are made up of Coastguard Rescue Officers (CROs) who are volunteers trained to carry out rescues and provide assistance to those in distress on the UK's coastline. There are approximately 3500 CROs and they carry out rope rescue, mud rescue, water rescue and search duties in all weathers and at all times. The teams are paged by the Joint Rescue Coordination Centre (JRCC) or Maritime Rescue Coordination Centre (MRCC) and respond to emergencies. They also assist other authorities such as the Police, Fire and Ambulance with their specialist expertise. The Coastguard Rescue Teams (CRT) will also provide safety advice to those they rescue and members of the public.

After recovering any casualty the CRTs will provide the assistance needed then will transfer them to a place of safety. The teams will also provide support to the lifeboats and SAR helicopters per tasking by the Operations Centres.

=== Search and rescue ===
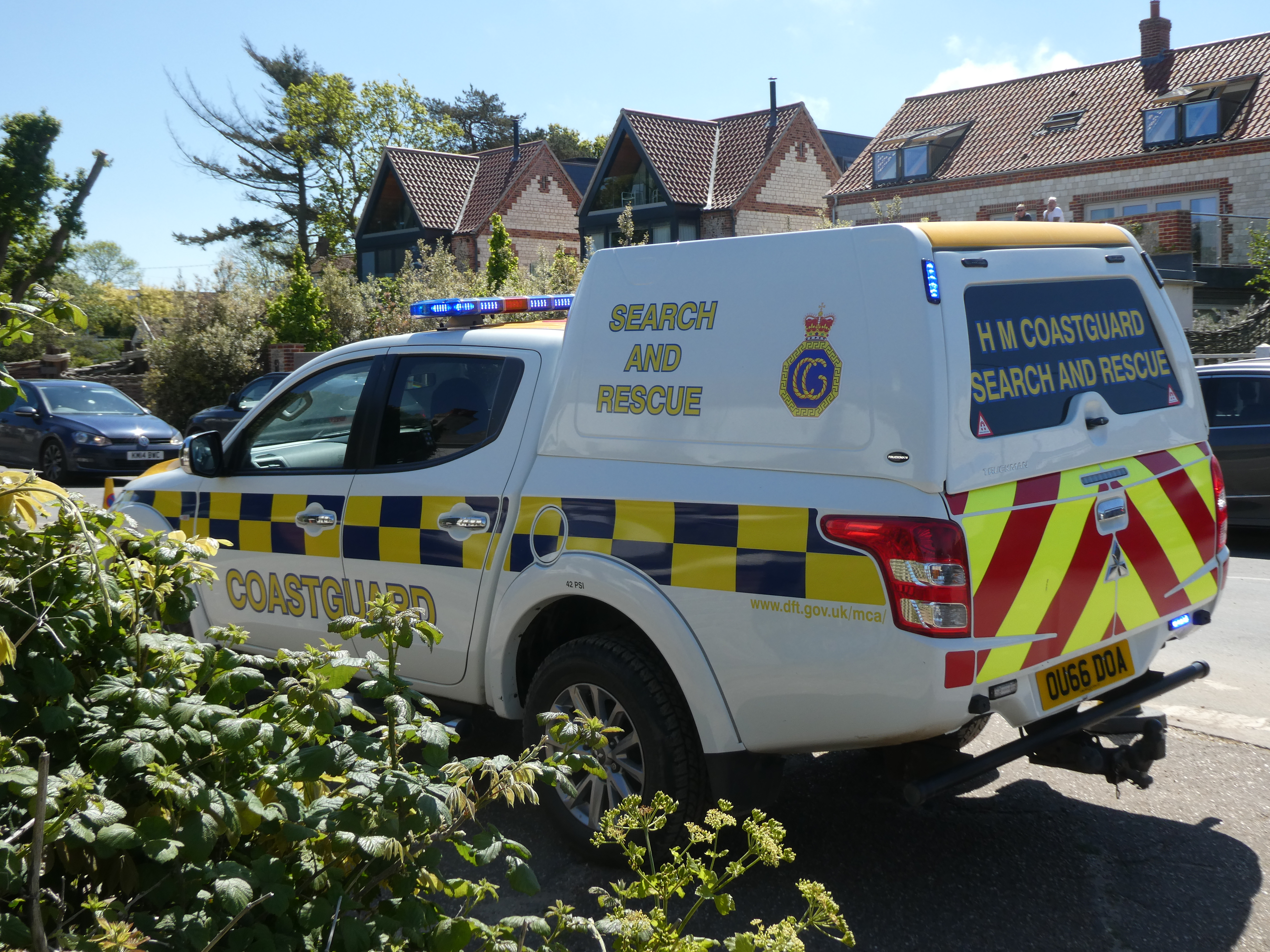
A Search and Rescue vehicle as seen in Brancaster Staithe

The Coastguard Rescue teams carry out searches of the shoreline which, depending on the team's location, could be urban or remote, beach, mud or cliff. The searches could be for vessels, wreckage, people who have abandoned ship, or missing persons. This is referred to as Lost and Missing Persons Search (L&MPS).

=== Water safety and rescue ===
Due to the nature of the work carried out by CROs they are trained to be safe when in or near the water. They are trained to be able to carry out rescues in extremely rough conditions and the team will work together to recover the casualty from danger while ensuring that each team member is safe.

The training the CRT have will depend on the location of the CRT. All teams are trained in land search methods, water rescue and casualty care.

=== Mud rescue ===
Mud rescue is described as the most physically demanding type of rescue there is. Mud rescue technicians walk on the mud using equipment to prevent them getting stuck, and recover casualties. In most cases these are people who have become too tired to continue walking on the mud while taking a shortcut. The CRTs also have rescue equipment to extract people deeply stuck in mud, including inflatable rescue walkways, mud lances, and specialist footwear inspired by ducks' feet.

=== Rope rescue ===
Rope rescue methods are to recover casualties who have fallen or are stuck on cliffs or difficult to reach areas, be they rural or urban. The teams work together to lower a rope rescue technician who will assess the casualty, provide first aid treatment if necessary and then recover the casualty to safety, before transferring the casualty to the next level of care as required.

=== Casualty Care (CERCC) ===
Each team member receives extensive casualty care training that goes much further than just basic first aid, the course known as CERCC (Coastguard Emergency Responder Casualty Care) is taught by a team of trainers locally around the coast with regular role play training and evaluation. Each CRO is required to have his/her CERCC qualification re-validated every three years.

The HMCG CERCC qualification is bench marked at Level D (Diploma) of the PHEM framework from the Faculty of Pre-Hospital Care, and is also equivalent in syllabus content to the First Response Emergency Care Level 3 Certificate (FREC 3) level.

In 2017 the CERCC course was updated to reflect and include latest research and guidance such as implementation of the 2015 European Council Resuscitation Guidelines, 2017 JRCALC Guidelines and the British Thoracic Society Oxygen Guidelines. Each frontline Coastguard Rescue Vehicle carries a fully stocked Coastguard Emergency Responder Bag which includes a first aid kit, pelvic splint, frac straps, airways set (OPA and NPA), trauma dressings, airway suction kit and bag, and valve and mask set. In 2022 HM Coastguard provided each operational team with a Heartsine Samaritan 500p Automated External Defibrillator (AED).

== Role and responsibilities ==
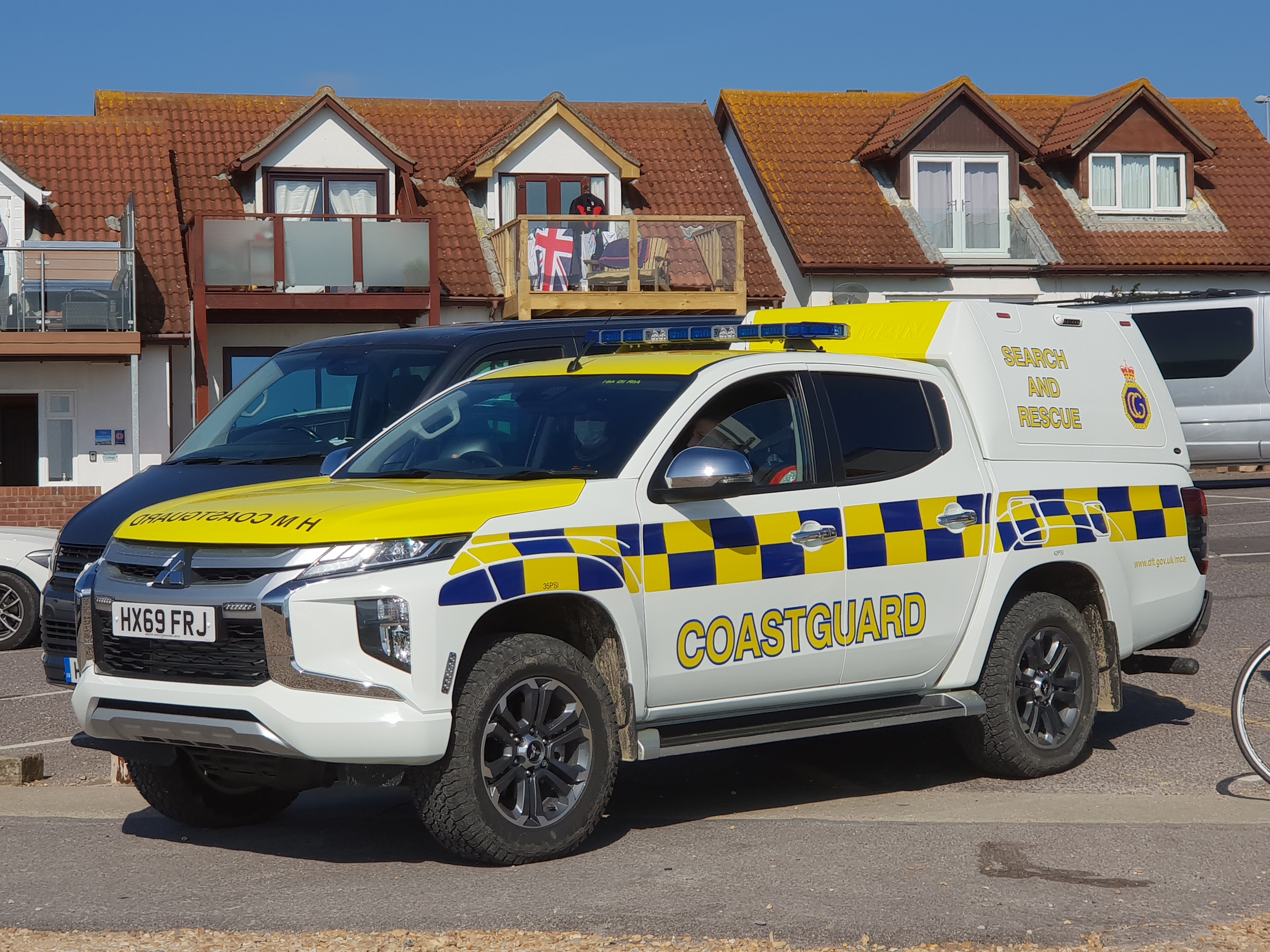
A Mitsubishi L200 search and rescue vehicle at Overcombe

The Maritime and Coastguard Agency (MCA) is an executive agency responsible throughout Britain for implementing the Government's maritime safety policy. That includes initiating and co-ordinating search and rescue at sea or on the coast through His Majesty's Coastguard, ensuring that ships meet British and international safety rules, and preventing maritime pollution.

Typical incidents to which the Coastguard is summoned include:

- Persons in difficulties in the water;
- Persons in difficulties on cliffs and the shoreline;
- Pleasure craft in difficulties;
- Medical emergencies on vessels, offshore installations or islands;
- Incidents involving offshore oil and gas installations;
- Incidents involving offshore renewables installations, e.g. wind farms;
- Persons threatening or attempting self-harm in the coastal environment;
- Missing persons on the coast;
- Merchant vessels in difficulties;
- Medical evacuations of injured or ill persons at sea;
- Vessel groundings;
- Collisions at sea;
- Reports of suspected ordnance below the high water mark.

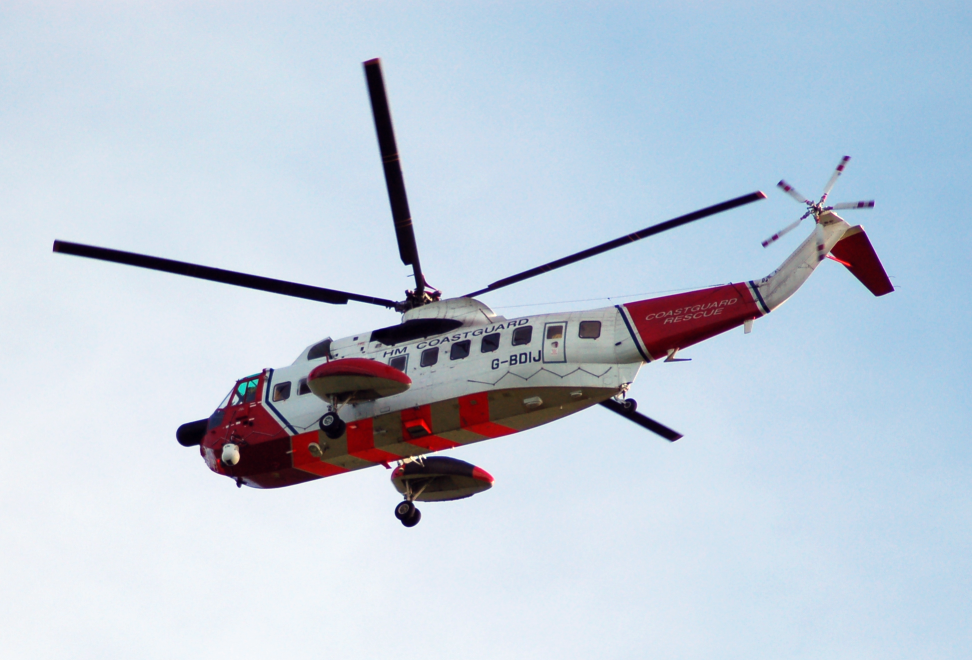
HM Coastguard helicopter India Juliet over Dorset pre-2008

Ships in distress or the public reporting an accident should make a Mayday call on MF radio, marine VHF radio channel 16, or by dialling 999 or 112 on a telephone. The Coastguard MRCCs continuously monitor all the maritime distress frequencies (including the international VHF distress signal frequency 156.8 MHz i.e. channel 16) and have access to satellite based monitoring systems. The MRCC then co-ordinates the emergency response. This normally involves requesting the launch of a local RNLI lifeboat or independent lifeboat, deploying a local Coastguard Rescue Team, or a Search and Rescue helicopter, making broadcasts and requesting assistance from vessels in the area. Depending on the circumstances of each incident, the Coastguard MRCC may also request for other emergency services to be deployed to the incident or to meet other units returning from the incident, for example in the case of a medical emergency. Known as Declared Assets, the most commonly utilised are:

- HM Coastguard's own Coastguard Rescue Teams
- Inshore lifeboats, all-weather lifeboats and inshore rescue hovercraft operated by the Royal National Lifeboat Institution and other independent lifeboat stations.
- Other nominated inshore rescue services
- Search and rescue helicopters under contract to the MCA
- Emergency towing vessels (ETV) – powerful tugs contracted to the MCA
- Nominated Fire Service teams for cliff and mud rescue as well as firefighting and chemical incident response for vessels at sea
- Nominated beach lifeguard units

Declared Assets are facilities that have given a declaration to the Coastguard of a certain level of availability or training. Other, additional assets that may be tasked to assist with any incident include; Mountain Rescue Teams, the Armed Forces, local police forces, fire and rescue services, regional ambulance services, and volunteer lifeguards. In addition, various "Memorandums of Understanding" exist between the Coastguard and other emergency services to establish primacy when working in each other's areas of expertise. For example, whilst the police maintain primacy for locating missing persons on land, an understanding exists for HM Coastguard to coordinate coastal searches that include the police, owing to the expertise and local knowledge of Coastguard Rescue Teams.

HM Coastguard co-ordinates air and sea-based SAR through its ten Maritime Rescue Coordination Centres (MRCCs) around the UK. These are in Aberdeen, Belfast, Humber, Dover, Falmouth, Holyhead, Shetland, Milford Haven, Stornoway, and London-Woolwich.

The MCGA currently contracts the UK Search and rescue helicopter service from Bristow Helicopters, who operate 18 SAR helicopters and six fixed-wing planes from 10 permanent bases in the UK, (plus from 2026, 2 seasonal bases). There are two aircraft positioned at each base, plus a duty aircraft and a spare in the event that the duty aircraft is unserviceable. The helicopter bases are at Stornoway Airport, Sumburgh Airport, Prestwick, Inverness Airport, Caernarfon Airport, Humberside Airport, St Athan, Lydd, Newquay Airport, Lee-on-Solent.

== Operations ==
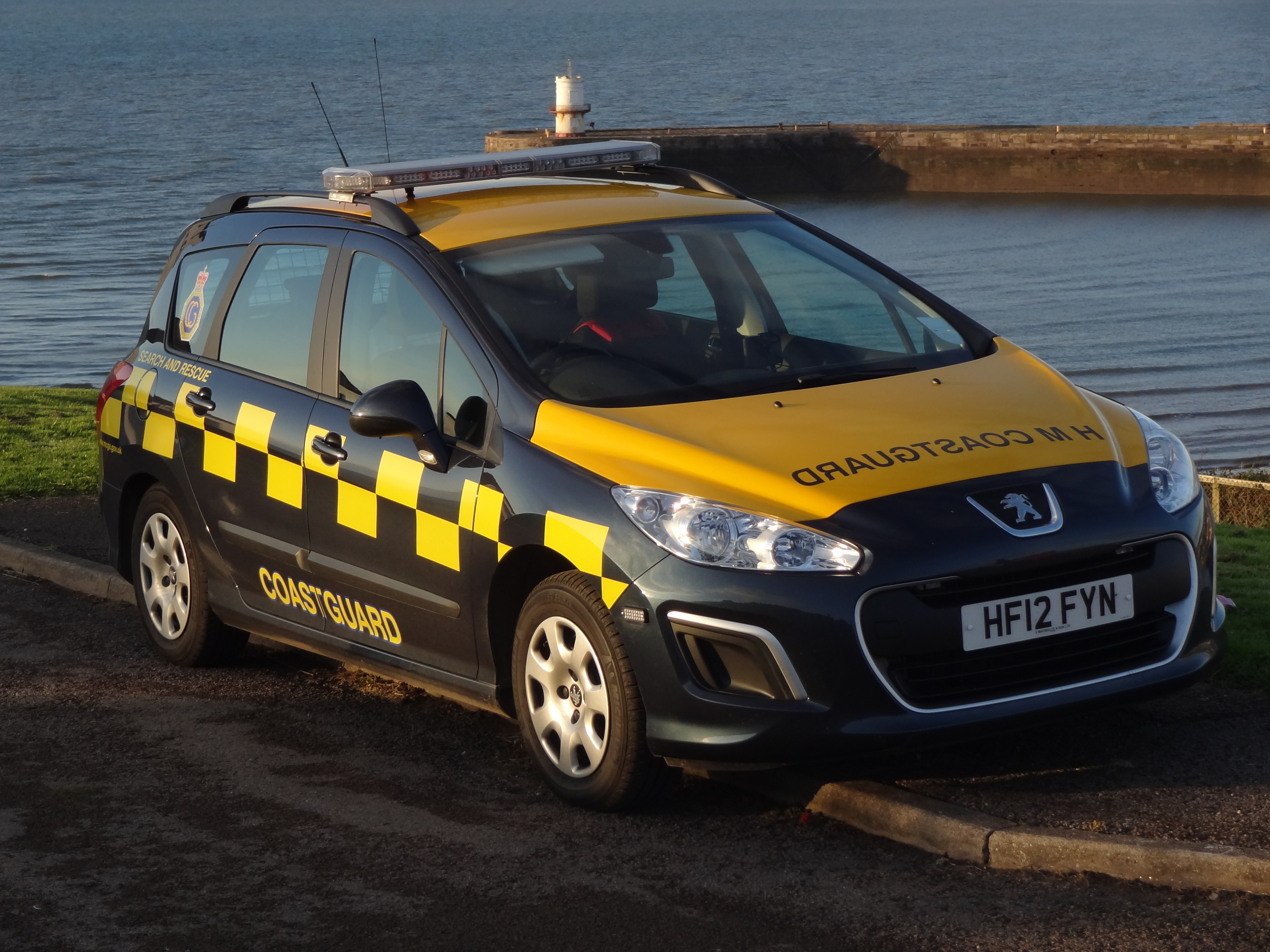
A 2012 Peugeot 308 estate at Whitehaven

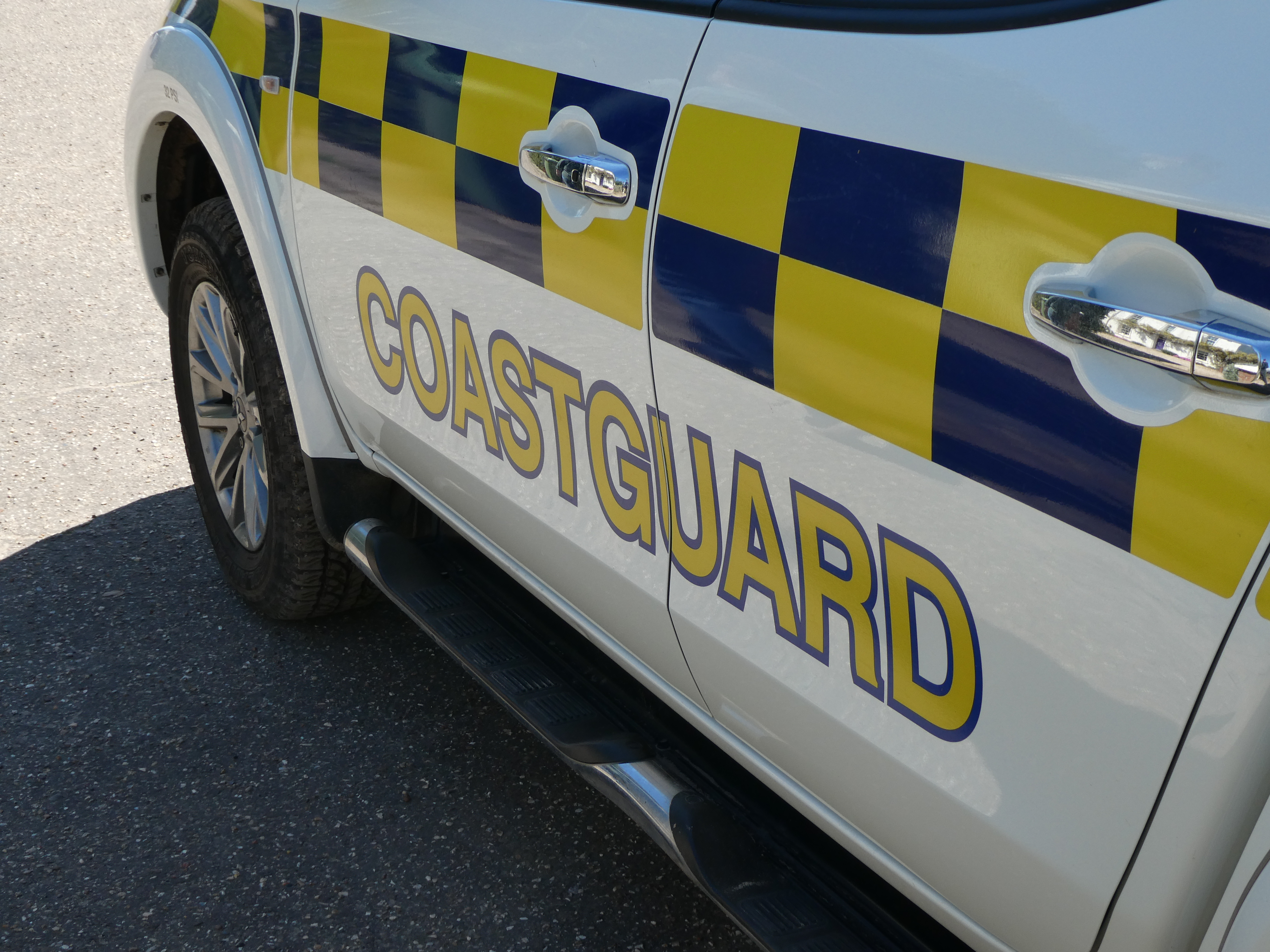
Search and Rescue vehicle livery, as seen in Brancaster Staithe

=== Distress calls ===
When HM Coastguard receive a distress call by a 999 or 112 phone call, by radio or any other means at the MRCC, a Maritime or Senior Maritime Operations Officer will use their training to question the caller to determine the location. The Maritime Operations Officer will normally be able to confirm the location given by the caller if the call is on the 999 system as the equipment in the Operations room will display where it has come from. Coastguard Rescue Teams are paged via an SMS based system detailing the emergency incident, or via a VHF pager, although these are being phased out.

The Maritime Operations Officer will use the correct chart or map for the area and they are trained to ask questions that will help the caller identify where they are. The coastguard SMC (SAR Mission Co-ordinator) in charge of the watch will then decide which rescue resources will be used to conduct the SAR operation. The Maritime Operations Officer who takes the call may keep talking to the caller, while another can be passing information to the chosen rescue resources.

=== Resources ===
These assets will depend on the situation, but could be one of the 365 Coastguard Rescue Teams (CRT) around the UK coast made up of 3,500 Coastguard Rescue Officers, RNLI or independent lifeboats, Search and Rescue fixed wing aircraft or helicopters, or a civilian vessel or aircraft known to be in the vicinity, or who responds to a broadcast on radio made by the MRCC.

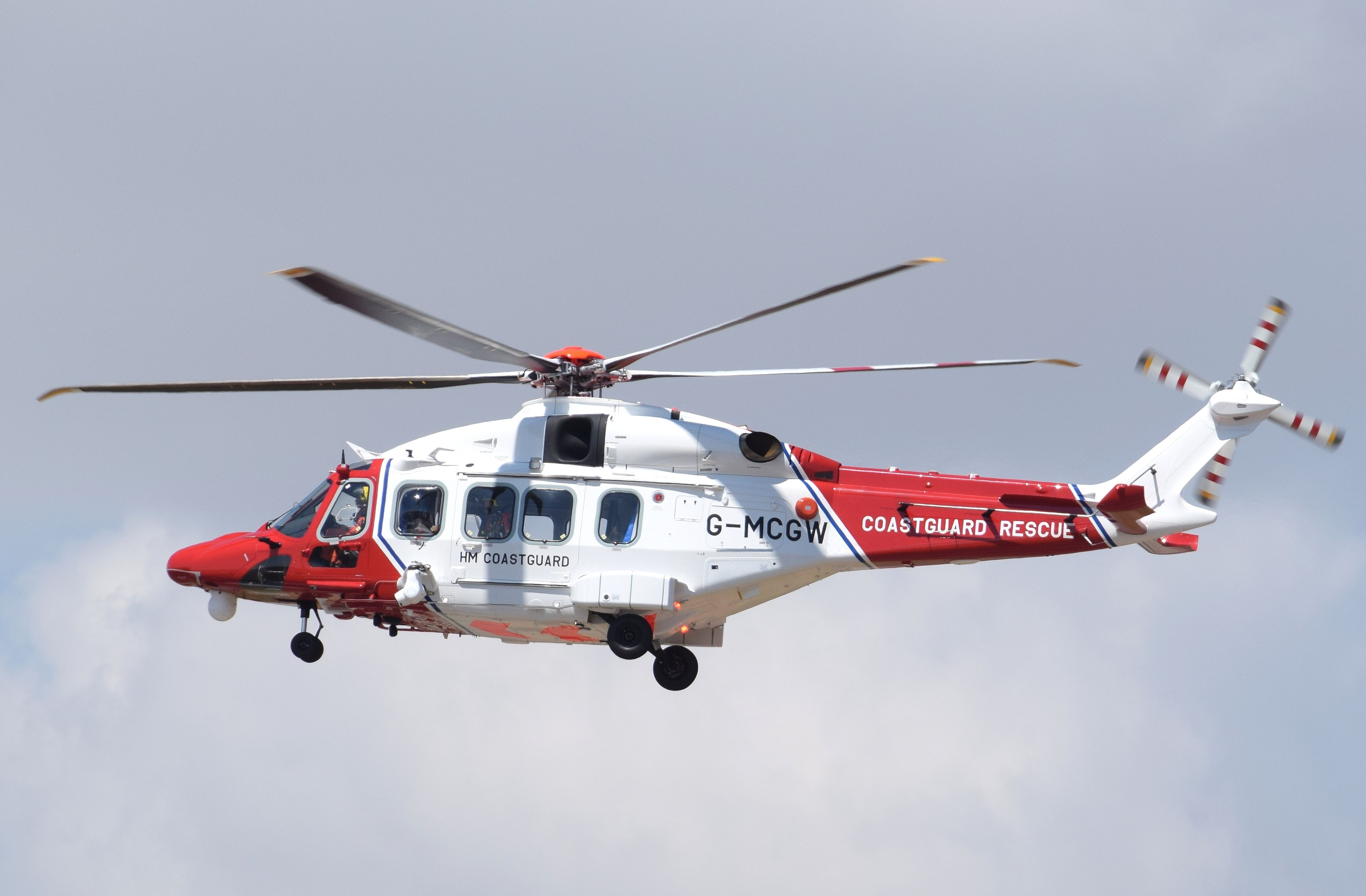
Leonardo AW189 helicopter of His Majesty's Coastguard, operated by Bristow Helicopters, arrives at the 2018 RIAT, England

The MRCC will call out and send the rescue units according to the nature and severity of the incident. The MRCC will then co-ordinate the SAR operation using the Coastguard Rescue Teams, lifeboats and helicopters or other vessels or aircraft, who carry out the physical rescue.

=== Officer in charge ===
Coastguard Rescue Teams have an Officer in Charge who is responsible for the action of that team or unit, management of the scene and joint coordination of the rescue with the MRCC. If the caller is, for example, stuck in mud, the CRT Officer in Charge (OIC) will coordinate which of the team goes onto the mud to carry out the rescue. If it is someone stuck on a cliff the OIC will coordinate who is lowered over the cliff. All this is done while keeping the MRCC updated of their actions, and possibly being supported by lifeboats or a rescue helicopter. Each rescue resource is able to relay information about any casualty to each other and to the MRCC who retains overall coordination. The coxswain of a lifeboats and the SAR helicopter pilot would be in command of that rescue asset, whilst being coordinated by the MRCC or the OIC.

The rescue resources work together with the MRCC as the coordinating authority to carry out SAR response. Once the persons in danger are rescued the person is then given the assistance they need and then transferred to a place of safety.

=== Ceremonial ===
HM Coastguard also parade at local Remembrance Parades and selected officers parade at the annual Remembrance Sunday parade at the Cenotaph in London.

== Locations ==
HM Coastguard co-ordinates activities from one Joint Rescue Coordination Centre (JRCC) and nine Maritime Rescue Coordination Centres (MRCCs):

- JRCC UK at the National Maritime Operations Centre at Fareham. Incorporating Solent Coastguard, the UK Aeronautical Rescue Coordination Centre (ARCC) and UK Cospas-Sarsat Mission Control Centre (UKMCC).
- MRCC Dover, including the Channel Navigation Information Service for the Strait of Dover, and Sunk VTS covering the traffic separation schemes around the Sunk Light Vessel
- MRCC Humber (Bridlington)
- MRCC Aberdeen
- MRCC Shetland
- MRCC Stornoway
- MRCC Belfast (Bangor)
- MRCC Holyhead
- MRCC Falmouth
- MRCC Milford Haven

and one Maritime Rescue Sub-Centre (MRSC):

- MRSC London

All centres operate 24 hours a day. In addition Coastguard Rescue Teams are based locally at over 300 locations around the UK.

=== Aircraft ===
Operational locations of aeronautical search and rescue cover in the United Kingdom from 2017. The colour of the location mark indicates the type of helicopter at each location (green: Leonardo AW139, blue: Leonardo AW189, red: Sikorsky S92).

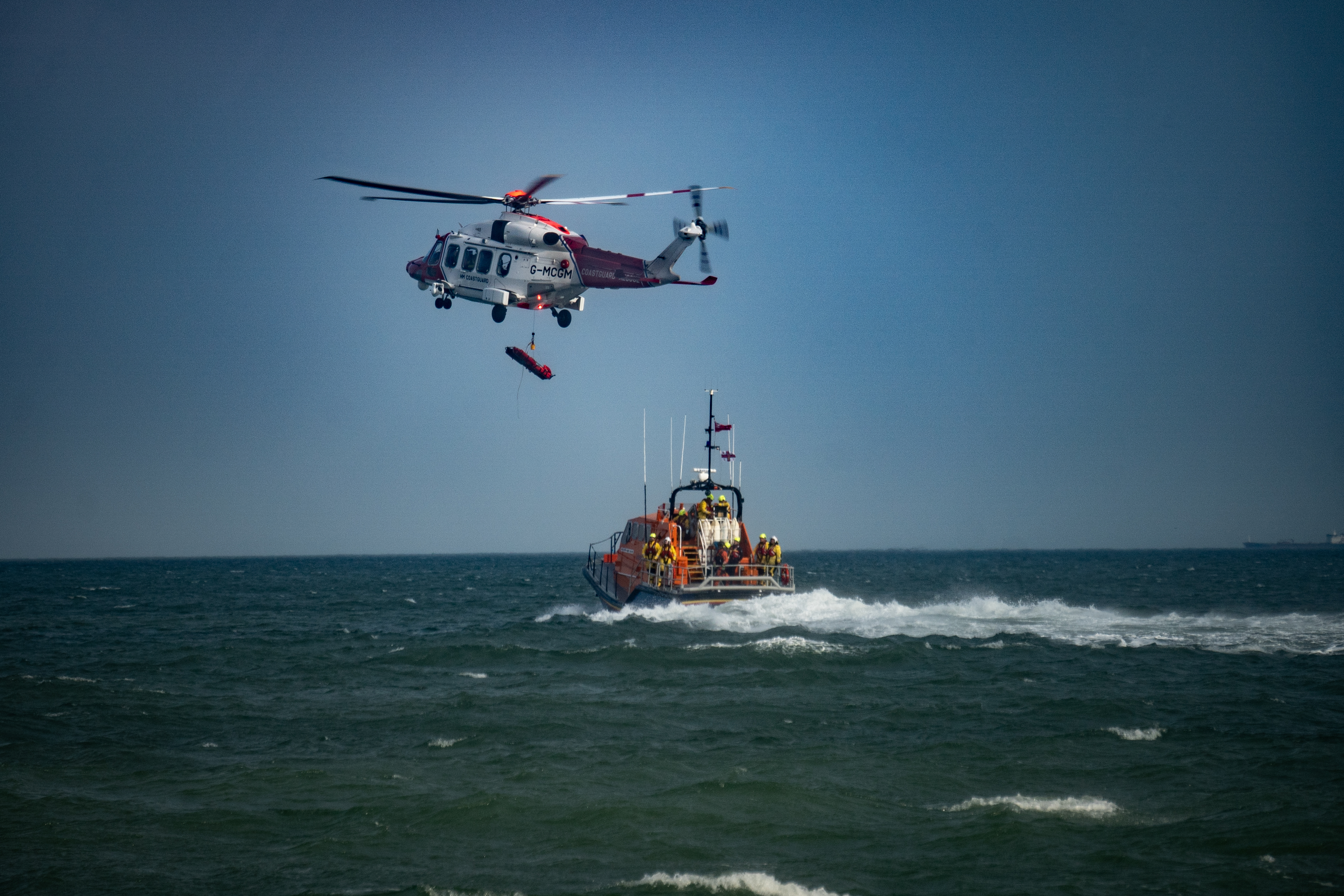
Coastguard 175 from Lee-on-Solent during winch rescue training with the RNLI Bembridge ALB.

Identified by its ICAO airline designator SRD, His Majesty's Coastguard operate the following crewed aerial assets; fixed-wing aircraft, and rotary-wing helicopters, along with rotary-wing unmanned aerial vehicles:

Fixed-wing

Operated by 2Excel Aviation:

- 3x Beechcraft King Air B350ER – maritime surveillance, search and rescue, counter-pollution
- 1x Beechcraft King Air B350 – maritime surveillance, search and rescue, counter-pollution
- 2x Beechcraft King Air B200 – maritime surveillance, search and rescue
- 2x Diamond DA62 – maritime surveillance

Operated by RVL Group:

- 1x Beechcraft King Air B200 – pollution patrol, surveillance, search and rescue
- 1x Cessna F406 – pollution patrol, surveillance, search and rescue

Helicopters

Owned and operated by Bristow Helicopters (IATA: UH, ICAO: BHL) under £1.6bn wet-lease contract; all in the search and rescue role

- 10x Sikorsky S-92
- 10x Leonardo AW189
- 2x Leonardo AW139

Uncrewed aerial systems (UAS)

- 4x Schiebel Camcopter S-100 – EOS, search and rescue

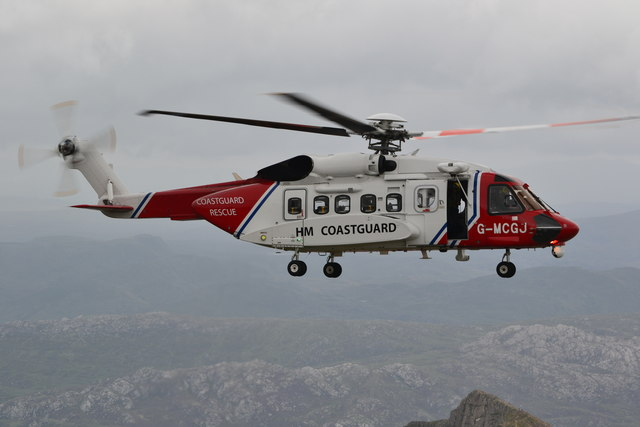
Coastguard helicopter at Snowdon.

The coastguard had previously trialed an Elbit Hermes 900 UAS out of Aberporth, Wales.

==== Funding and locations ====
Under a ten-year £1.6 billion contract starting in 2015, Bristow Helicopters took over responsibility for aerial search and rescue operations within the United Kingdom on behalf of HM Coastguard. Under the contract, Sikorsky S-92 and Leonardo AW189 helicopters operate from ten locations around the British Isles. Ten S-92s are based, two per site, at Stornoway, Sumburgh, Humberside, Newquay, and Caernarfon. Ten AW189s operate, two per site, from Prestwick airport, Inverness, Lydd, Lee-on-Solent, and St Athan. Two aircraft are kept in reserve. All HMCG aircraft bases are operational 24 hours a day. Half of the new fleet was built in Yeovil, in Somerset.

The Maritime and Coastguard Agency (MCA) released a tender in 2021 for their second-generation UK search and rescue aviation programme (UKSAR2G), for an upgraded helicopter, fixed-wing aircraft, and UAV service. In July 2022, the contract was awarded to a joint bid from Bristow Helicopters (helicopter and UAV) and 2Excel Aviation (fixed wing), worth £1.6 billion over 10 years. The SAR2G service commenced in November 2024.

== Communications and technology ==
=== Communications ===
A variety of communication platforms are used depending on the individual asset and situation. Communication involving Coastguard Rescue Teams, inshore lifeboats (operated by the RNLI), other nominated inshore rescue teams and SAR air assets (both MOD and MCA) typically take place over VHF marine radio. Communication between normal vessels and HM Coastguard/Maritime Rescue Co-ordination Centres can take place over VHF radio, MF radio and telephone (Satellite, Landline and Mobile).

HMCG have their own VHF radio network spread across the entire British Coast, this includes sites located on the Isle of Man, Northern Ireland and Remote Scottish Islands. There are also sites inland to support Search & Rescue in the Lake District. The network is designed in such a way that any Operator can monitor & transmit from any radio site location. A recent upgrade to the radio network has introduced even better resilience and alternative connectivity to ensure continuity of service.

HMCG also have access to and use the Airwave service available to all Category 1 & 2 responders in the UK. This allows better communication between other Emergency Service partners.

=== Technology ===
HMCG has invested heavily in introducing state of the art systems & services to aid Search & Rescue, started in 2014 after the organisational restructure a dedicated computer network was introduced specifically used for operational working. In more recent years a rolling refresh of technology continues to keep the service at the cutting edge of all available technology.

Coastguard Rescue Stations have recently benefited from the installation of new Wifi services & tablet devices (one per station), as well as new web services for volunteers for communications and training.

As part of the recent UKSAR2G tender, unmanned aircraft (drones) technology has been provisioned, with feeds potentially being provided to Maritime Rescue Coordination Centres (MRCC) for better incident working.

== Rank structure ==
=== Current rank structure ===
King Charles III is the Honorary Commodore of HMCG, and wears a uniform with the ranks insignia of Chief Coastguard plus an extra bar.

His Majesty's Coastguard

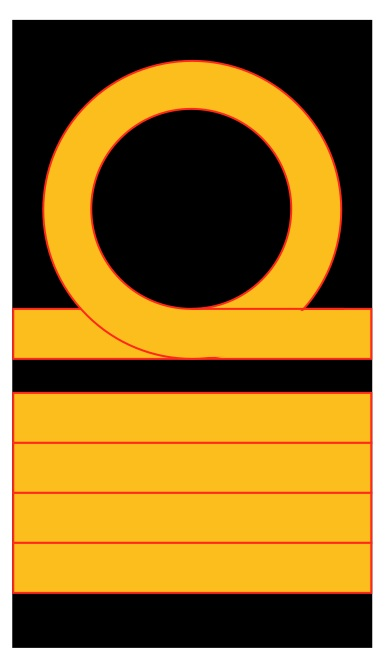
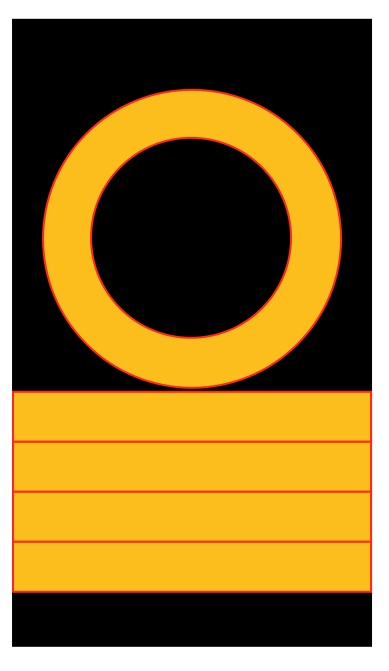
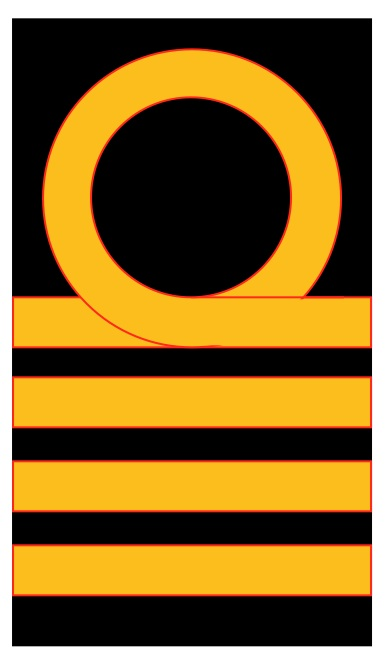
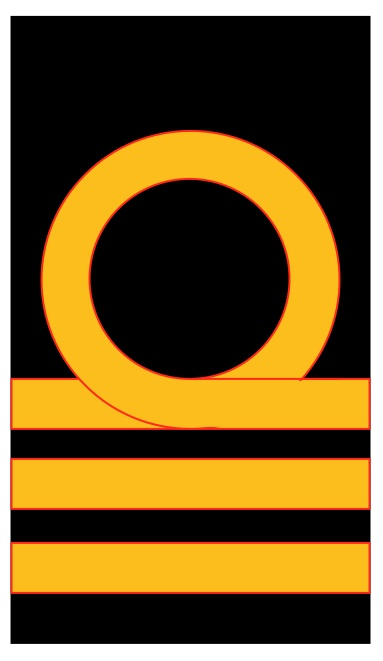
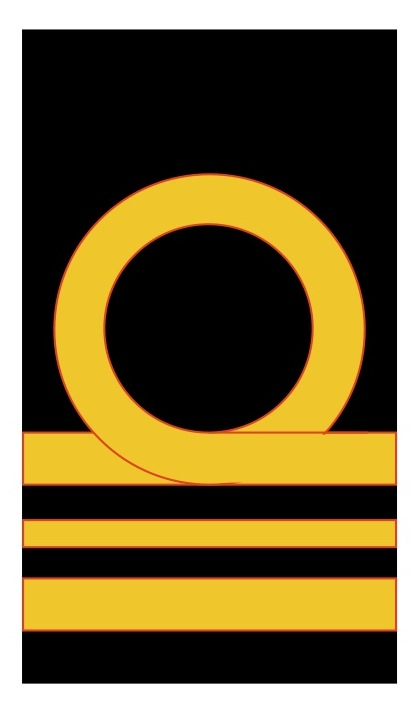
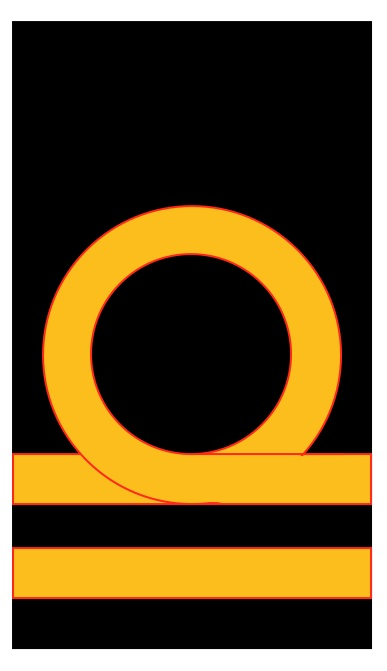
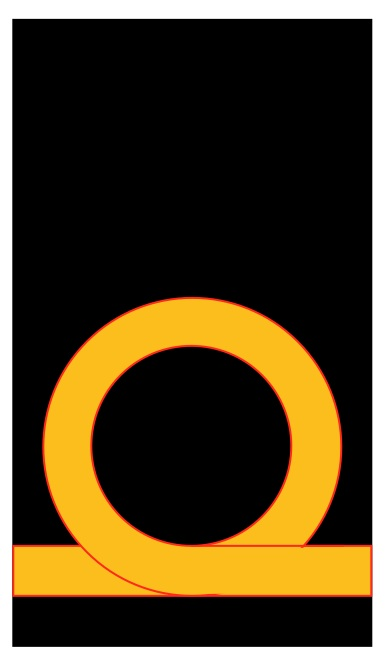
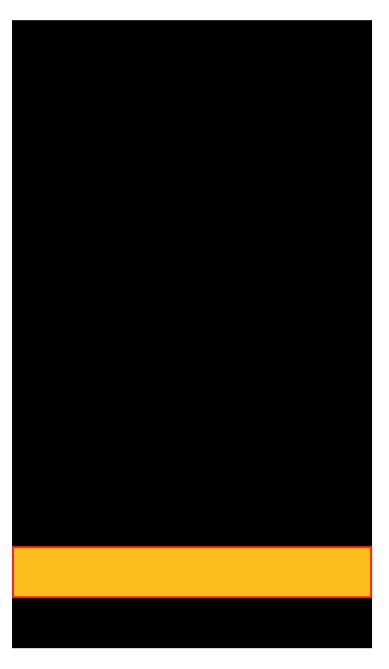

Maritime Operations
Honorary Commodore
Chief Coastguard
Assistant Chief Coastguard
Strategic Commander / Head of Strategic Functions
Rescue Coordination Centre Manager
Maritime Rescue Coordination Centre Team Leader
Senior Maritime Operations Officer
Maritime Operations Officer
Maritime Operations Officer (Trainee)

Aeronautical Operations

Strategic Commander
Rescue Coordination Centre Manager
Aeronautical Rescue Coordination Centre Team Leader
Senior Aeronautical Operations Officer
Aeronautical Operations Officer
Aeronautical Operations Officer (Trainee)

Coastal Operations

Strategic Commander
Tactical Commander
Senior Coastal Operations Officer
Coastal Operations Officer

Operational Support

Operational Support Lead

Operational Support Administration Manager
Operational Support Officer

His Majesty's Coastguard
Coastal Operations

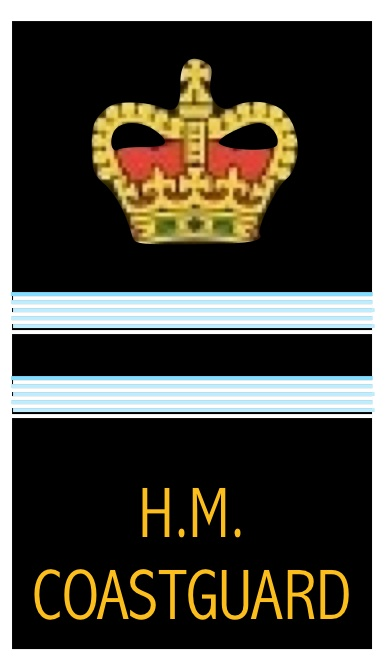
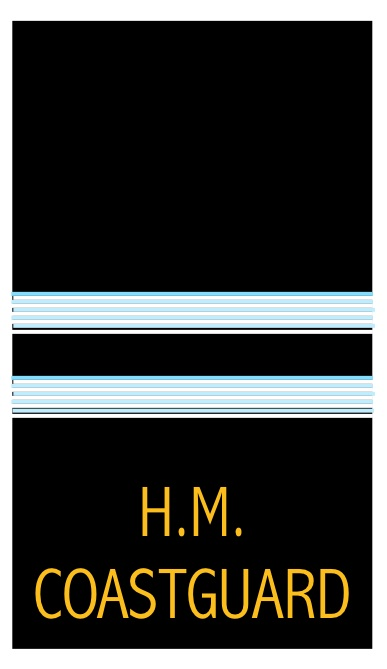

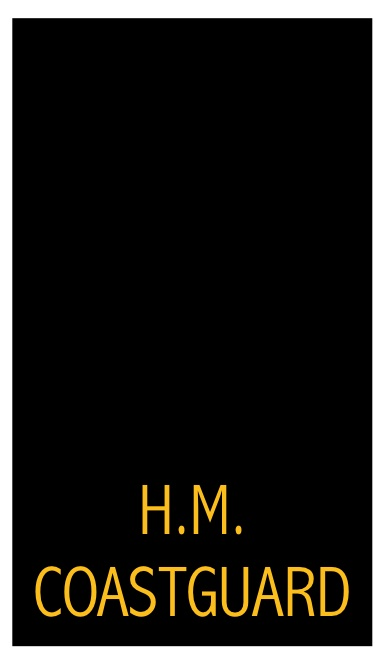

Station Officer (Voluntary)
Deputy Station Officer (Voluntary)
Rescue Officer (Voluntary)

== Uniform ==
As a uniformed service with coastal responsibilities and maritime traditions, the appearance of HM Coastguard's uniform is similar to those of the Royal Navy and the former HM Customs and Excise. There are three types of uniform:

1. Ceremonial
2. Maritime and aeronautical
3. Coastal, including personal protective equipment (PPE)

=== Ceremonial uniform ===
Akin to the Royal Navy No. 1 dress, the ceremonial uniform is reserved for use solely on special occasions, e.g. when officers are representing HM Coastguard at state occasions, or on request for significant personal occasions:

- white-topped peaked cap (male) or bowler hat (female) with HM Coastguard cap badge
- white shirt and black tie
- black reefer jacket with two rows of buttons and rank insignia
- black trousers
- dark polished shoes
- black or white gloves

Medal ribbons are worn on the left breast. Rank is worn on both cuffs. "HM Coastguard" shoulder titles are worn on each shoulder of the tunic. For public duties in cold weather (e.g. the annual Remembrance Parade at the Cenotaph in London), a greatcoat may be worn. Black (everyday/formal) or white (formal only) gloves may be worn, depending on the nature of the occasion.

Some officers may also choose to carry a naval style sword for formal occasions, at their own expense.

=== Maritime and aeronautical uniform ===
Akin to the Royal Navy No. 3 dress, this is the everyday uniform worn by Maritime and Aeronautical staff:

- white-topped peaked cap with HM Coastguard cap badge (females may choose to wear the bowler hat instead)
- white long-sleeve shirt and black tie, or white short-sleeve shirt with open collar
- dark blue NATO-style wool jumper
- dark blue waterproof coat or dark blue Kintyre coat
- black trousers
- black shoes

Rank slides are worn on epaulettes, along with HM Coastguard identifiers.

=== Coastal uniform ===
Akin to elements of the Royal Navy No. 4 dress, the coastal uniform is worn by staff of the Coastguard Rescue Service:

- white-topped peaked cap with HM Coastguard cap badge
- blue long-sleeved or short-sleeved shirt; dark blue t-shirt for outdoor duties
- dark blue half-zip or full-zip fleece
- black trousers for indoor duties; dark blue cargo trousers for outdoor duties
- black shoes for indoor duties; black boots for outdoor duties

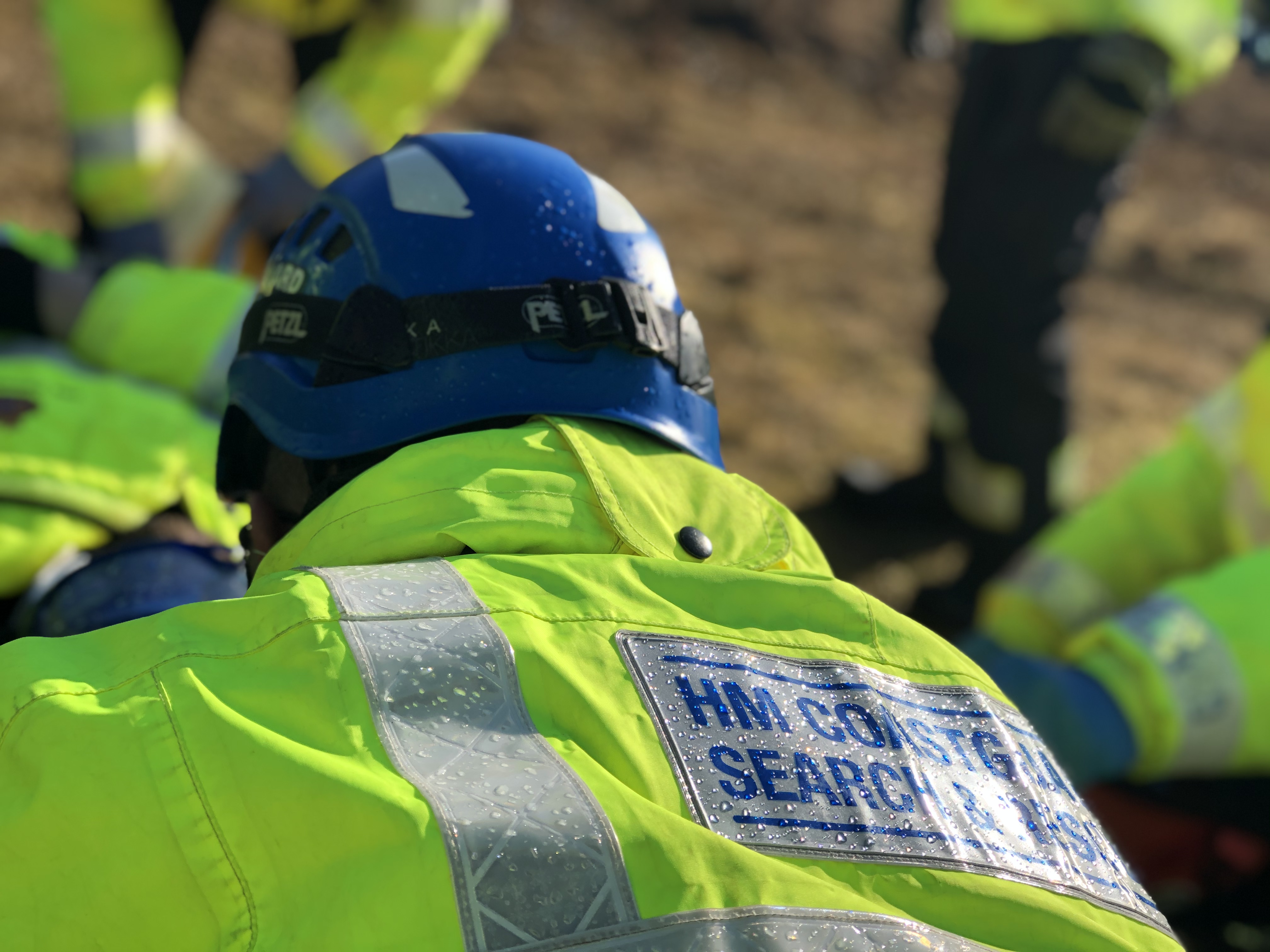
HM Coastguard Rescue Officer in full outdoor kit

As additional kit for staff of the Coastguard Rescue Service, officers wear and equip the following items when attending an incident, on top of the standard coastal uniform:

- blue HM Coastguard overalls
- safety boots
- blue safety helmet with headtorch
- safety glasses and/or safety goggles, where appropriate
- safety gloves
- high-visibility wet weather gear
- high-visibility buff (a neck-worn protector)
- handheld VHF radio

Exterior items are appropriately marked to identify them as search and rescue workers.

== See also ==
- Maritime and Coastguard Agency
- H.M. Coastguard Long Service and Good Conduct Medal
- RAF Search and Rescue Force
- Royal Air Force Mountain Rescue Service
- Royal National Lifeboat Institution (RNLI)
- Independent lifeboats in Britain and Ireland
- Trinity House
- Isle of Man Coastguard
- Irish Coast Guard
- National Coastwatch Institution
- Receiver of Wreck
- Ports Police
