= Waterguard =

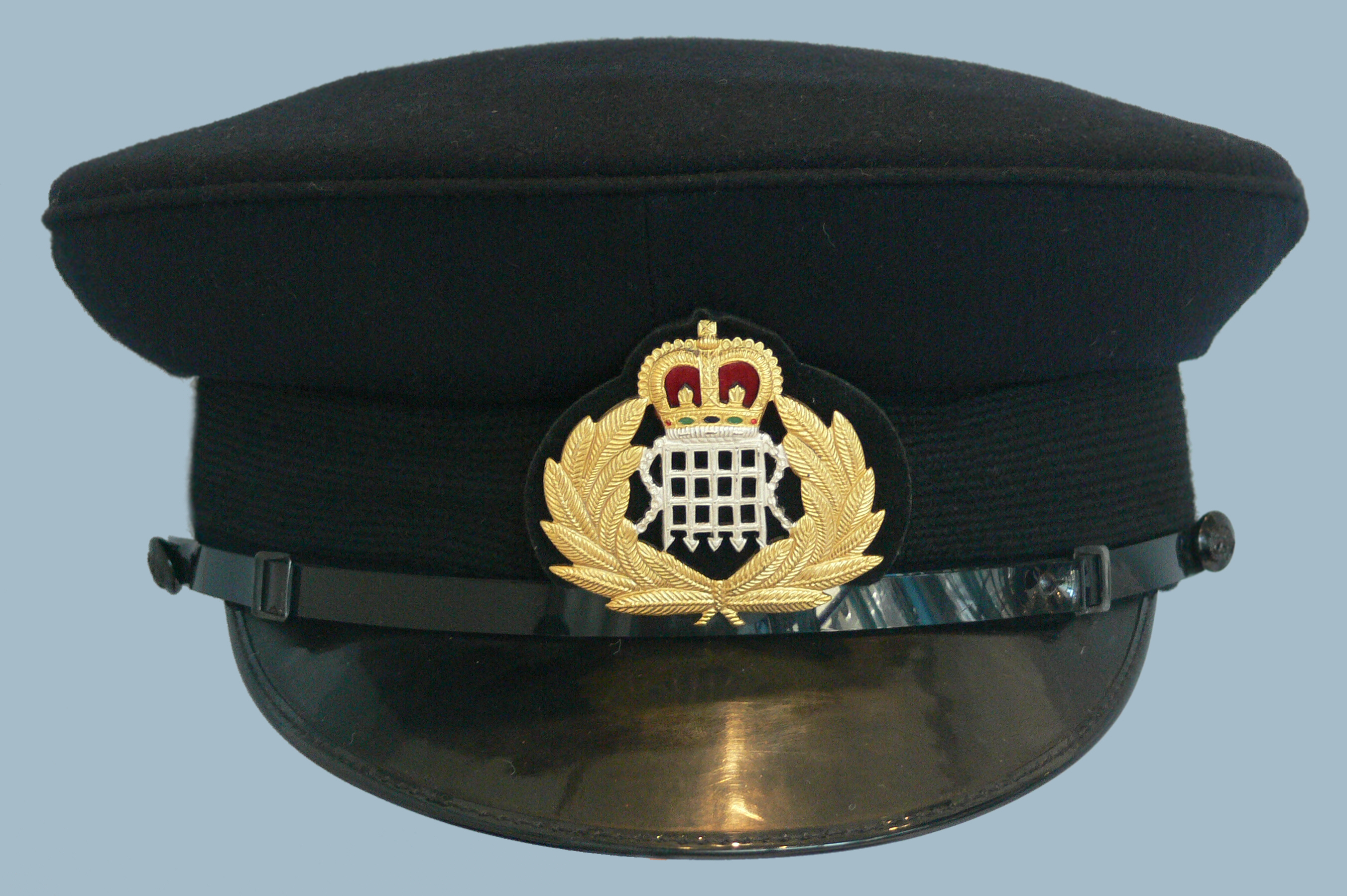
Waterguard officer's uniform cap.

The Waterguard was a division of HM Customs and Excise (HMCE) responsible for the control of vessels, aircraft, vehicles and persons arriving into and departing from the United Kingdom. This included crew members and passengers, as well as persons travelling on foot. Waterguard officers were responsible for applying the allowances provided for in law and for collection of customs and excise revenue on the excess. The officers were also responsible for the enforcement of the prohibitions and restrictions, including controlled drugs and plant and animal health. With the reorganization of HM Customs and Excise in 1972 the Waterguard was renamed the 'Preventive Service' and the functions of the Waterguard continued to be carried out as part of the HMCE (and its successor HM Revenue and Customs) until the establishment of the UK Border Agency in 2008.

== History ==
Historically defence of the British coastline had fallen to Wardens of the Coast and later the Vice-Admirals of the coast, who oversaw the superintendence of the Sea Guard Militia assigned to each coastal maritime county during the 13th, 14th and 15th centuries, and later the Sea Fencibles who operated from the 18th and 19th centuries. The Waterguard was formed in 1809 as the "Preventive Waterguard" (also known as the Preventive Boat Service) to combat smuggling, the Waterguard was an independent arm of revenue enforcement and complemented the "riding officers" (stationed along the south coast of England) who patrolled the shore on horseback, and the offshore revenue cutters (which were owned and operated by both the Board of Customs and the Board of Excise). The Waterguard was initially based in watch houses around the coast, and boat crews patrolled inshore waters around the coast in small boats each night. It was placed under Admiralty control from 1816 to 1822, when it and the riding officers and cutters were amalgamated under the control of HM Customs and renamed the Coast Guard (itself placed under Admiralty control in 1856). With the Coast Guard having moved away from preventive work in the years that followed, the Waterguard was re-formed as part of HM Customs in 1891 and absorbed into the Customs and Excise department in 1909.

The name "Waterguard" became misleading after 1923, when their domain was extended to the border between Northern Ireland and the Irish Free State (now the Republic of Ireland), and they also came to carry out controls at airports and other places of entry into the United Kingdom. Waterguard officers were often referred to simply as "customs officers", although until 1972 officers of Customs and Excise were non-uniformed, the outdoor service, and were responsible for the examination and clearance of cargo (rather than passengers), as well as control of Purchase Tax. When Purchase Tax was replaced by VAT, control of this tax became the responsibility of HM Customs and Excise.

== See also ==
- HM Coastguard
- HM Customs and Excise
