= Lagos State Sports Commission =

Lagos government agency

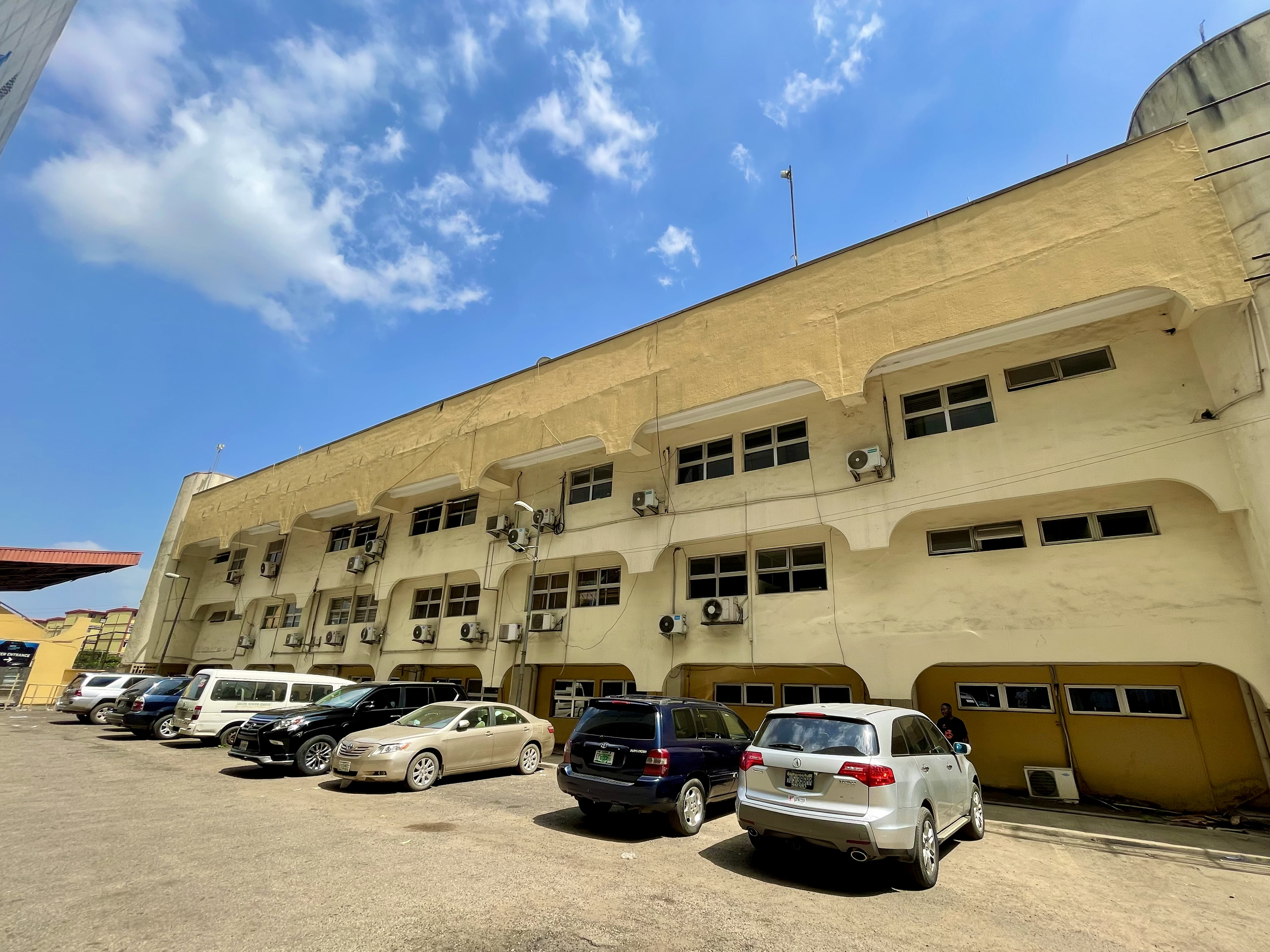

Agency overview
- Formed: February 1, 2017
- Headquarters: Teslim Balogun Stadium, Surulere, Lagos, Nigeria
- Agency executive: Lekan Fatodu, Director General
- Website: www.lssc.lg.gov.ng

The Lagos State Sports Commission (LSSC) is the apex government agency responsible for the development and management of sports in Lagos State, Nigeria.

== History ==
The Lagos State Sports Commission was created through an executive order (EO/AA01) on 17 June 2015 by Akinwunmi Ambode, Governor of Lagos State. The commission emerged from the defunct Office of Sports within the Ministry of Youth, Sports and Social Development (MYSSD) and the Lagos State Sports Council. The formal legal framework for the commission was established when the governor signed the enabling law on 1 February 2017. On February 2, 20204, the governor of Lagos State, Babajide Sanwo-Olu appointed Lekan Fatodu as the director general of the Lagos State Sports Commission.

== Sports facilities ==
=== Stadia ===
- Teslim Balogun Stadium, Surulere
- Mobolaji Johnson Arena (formerly Onikan Stadium), Onikan
- Agege Stadium, Agege
- Campos Mini Stadium, Lagos Island

=== Other facilities ===
- Rowe Park Sports Centre, Yaba
- Epe Creation Centre
- Sari Iganmu Mini Stadium, Iganmu
- Ijede Mini Stadium, Ijede
- Amuto Playing Ground
- Isheri Swimming Pool/Football
- Abesan Stadium
- Jalisco Mini Stadium, Oshodi
- Orile Iganmu Playing Ground

== Sports associations ==
The commission oversees 44 sports associations, which are primarily responsible for grassroots sports development.

== See also ==
- Sports in Nigeria
- Nigerian Football Association
- Nigerian Basketball Association
