= HM Customs and Excise =

Former British government department

- Final logo of HM Customs and Excise

- Ensign of HM Customs and Excise

Non-ministerial government department overview
- Formed: 1909
- Preceding agencies: Board of Customs; Excise Department of the Inland Revenue
- Dissolved: 1 April 2005
- Superseding Non-ministerial government department: HM Revenue & Customs
- Jurisdiction: United Kingdom
- Headquarters: New Kings Beam House, Upper Ground, London

HM Customs and Excise (HMCE, properly known as Her Majesty's Customs and Excise at the time of its dissolution in 2005) was a department of the British Government formed in 1909 by the merger of HM Customs and HM Excise; its primary responsibility was the collection of customs duties, excise duties, and other indirect taxes.

Payments of customs dues have occurred in Britain for over one thousand years, and HMCE was formed from predecessor bodies with a long history.

With effect from 18 April 2005, HMCE merged with the Inland Revenue (which administered and collected direct taxes) to form a new department: HM Revenue and Customs (HMRC).

== Activities ==
The three main functions of HMCE were revenue collection, assessment and preventive work, alongside which other duties were performed.

=== Revenue collection ===
On behalf of HM Treasury, officers of HM Customs and Excise levied customs duties, excise duties, and other indirect taxes (such as Air Passenger Duty, Climate Change Levy, Insurance Premium Tax, Landfill Tax, Purchase Tax and value-added tax (VAT)).

=== Assessment ===
Officers spent significant amounts of time in docks, warehouses and depots and on board newly arrived ships assessing dutiable goods and cargoes. Specialist tools were provided e.g. for the measurement of containers or the specific gravity of alcohol.

=== Preventive work ===
HMCE was responsible for managing the import and export of goods and services into the UK; as such, its officers were active in the detection and prevention of attempts to evade the revenue laws, for example through smuggling or illicit distillation of alcohol. Since the early 17th century, the searching of vessels for illicit goods when undertaken by customs officers has been called 'rummaging'.

=== Other ===
For various reasons HMCE and its predecessors had accrued a variety of other responsibilities over the years, some of which had nothing to do with revenue collection and protection. Many of these additional duties pertained to the regulation of activities in UK coastal waters on behalf of HM Government (not least because HMCE had customs officers stationed all around the UK coast). Thus at various times in the 20th century HMCE was involved in receiving, regulating or recording:

- import and export licences
- trade statistics (since 1696)
- light dues (recorded since 1615)
- wrecks (statutory by 1713)
- embargoes
- quarantine and other public health restrictions (since 1663)
- occupational licensing
- registration of moneylenders
- exchange controls
- ship registration
- immigration control (in smaller ports and airports)

== Location ==
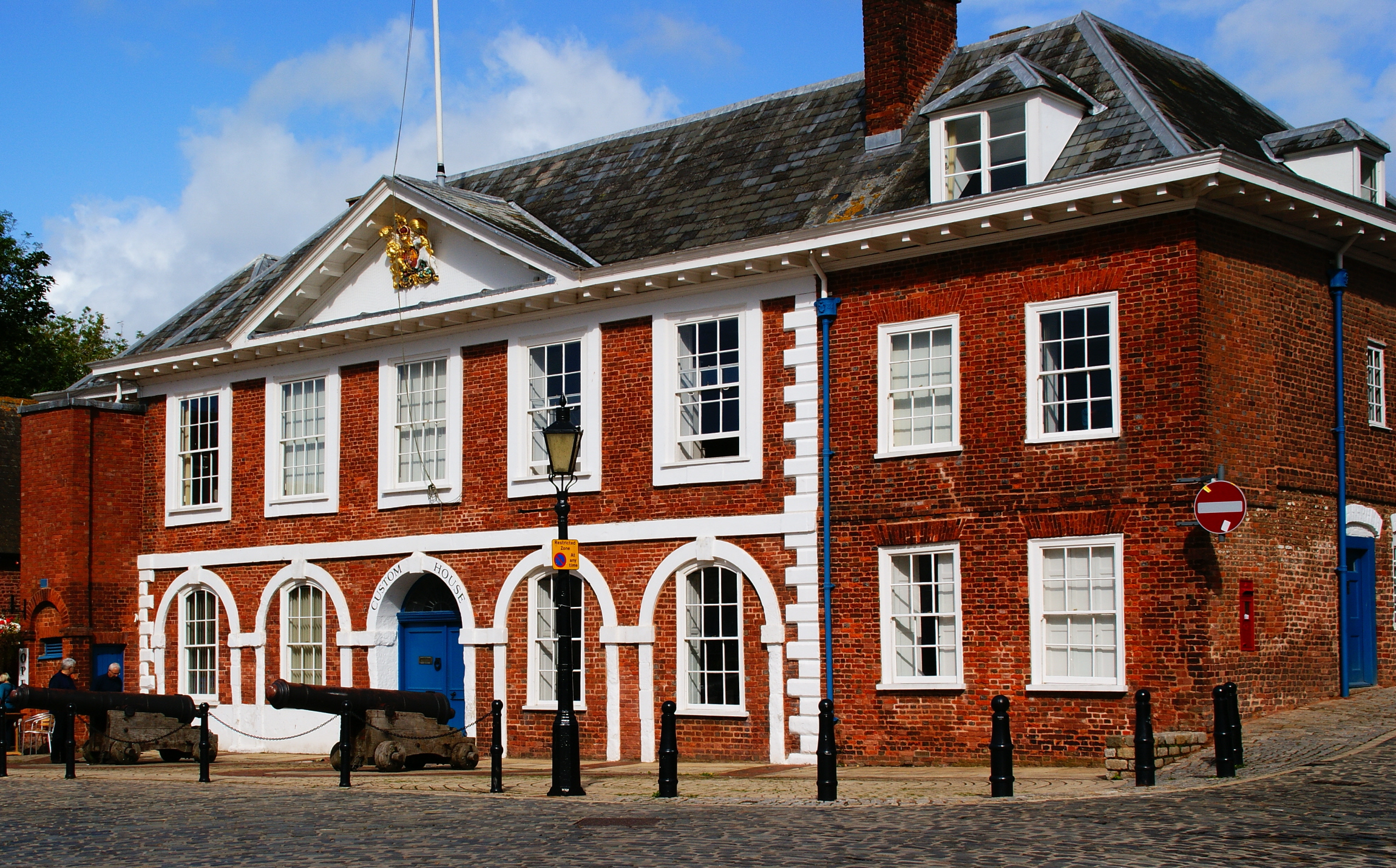
Exeter's former Custom House: built in 1681, it remained in use by HM Customs until 1989.

In the 1970s Customs and Excise officers were operating from around 2,000 offices located in all parts of the United Kingdom; they ranged in size from large regional centres to small outposts attached to distilleries and the like.

Historically, the Board of Customs and the Board of Excise were (along with the General Post Office) 'the only Crown Services organised on a country-wide basis'. Custom houses were to be found in all major ports of entry (as well as some smaller harbours). Excise offices were located both around the coast and inland (in former centuries, every market town in England had a designated Excise office, albeit not permanently staffed; often a room in a local inn would be adapted for the purpose when required).

The nation's borders were the prime location for much of HMCE's work. Before the 20th century the UK's only border was its coastline and customs activity was focused around the coast. The establishment of the Irish Free State in 1922 gave the United Kingdom a land border, which also required customs checkpoints; later, customs officers were needed at airports as well. As well as administering Customs declarations, HM Customs and Excise staff had responsibility for guarding the borders of the United Kingdom from smugglers. To try to achieve this, HMCE and its predecessors had a history of operating both on land and at sea.

=== Headquarters ===
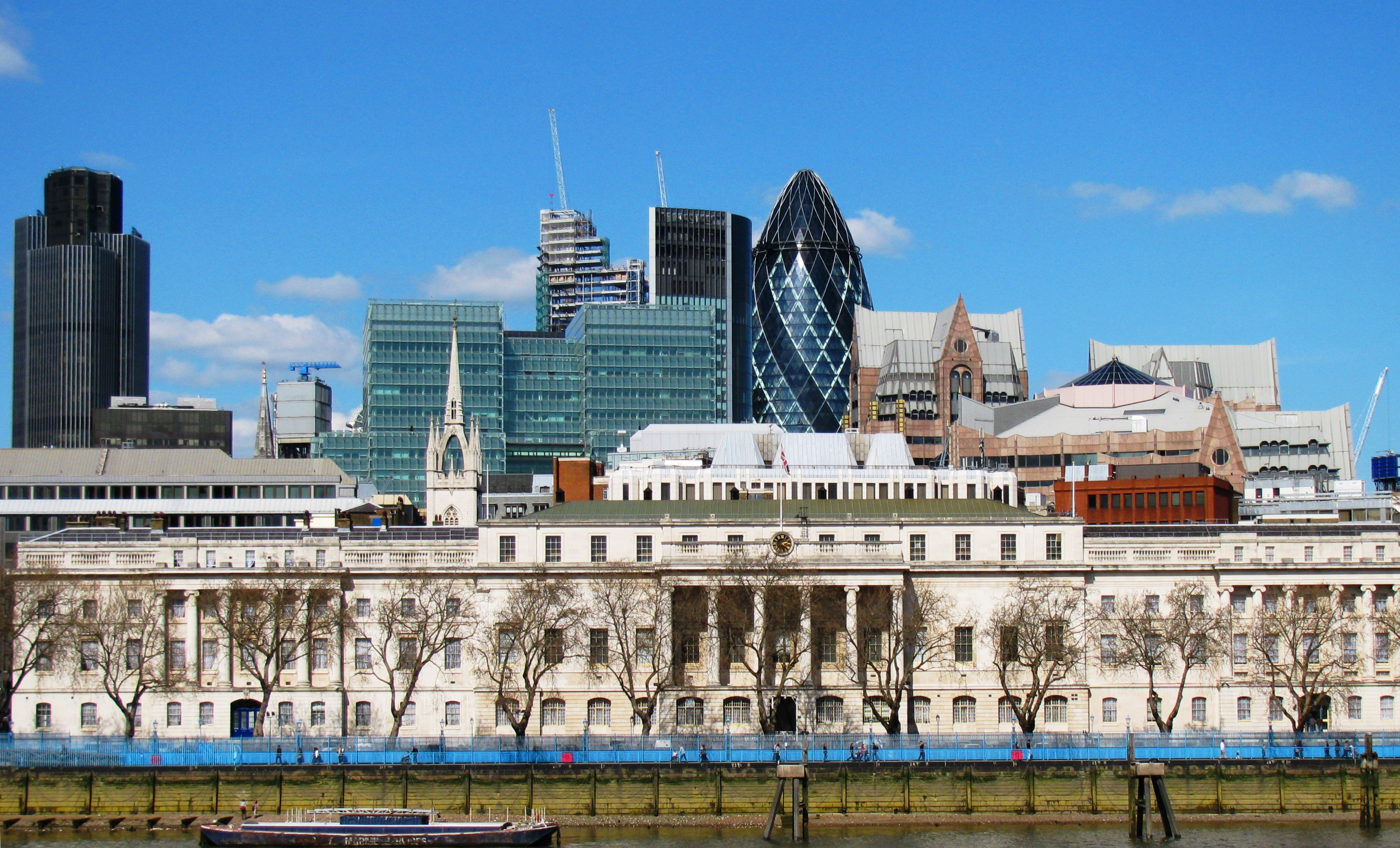
Custom House, Lower Thames Street, London: long-time home of HM Customs.

The historic headquarters of HM Customs was the Custom House on Lower Thames Street in the City of London. This went on to become the headquarters of HMCE when the Excise head office moved there from Somerset House in 1909. Later, however, the commissioners along with most of the headquarters staff were forced to move out after the building was damaged in a bombing raid in December 1940. They moved initially to Finsbury Square, then in 1952 to the newly built King's Beam House in Mark Lane. The damaged section of London's Custom House was later rebuilt and the building remained in use by HM Revenue and Customs until 2021. In 1987 the headquarters staff moved again to New King's Beam House 22 Upper Ground London SE1 in the area of Southwark.

== Corporate structure ==
The 1909 amalgamation of the (previously separate) Customs and Excise services required a new corporate structure, which substantially remained in place until 1971. The new Board of Customs and Excise had oversight of three inter-linked branches, each with its own management structure:

- The Headquarters Staff (based in London)
- The Outdoor Service (based at Customs and Excise offices all around the country)
- The Waterguard (uniformed preventive service: based at coastal locations, airports and border crossings).

The Board of Customs and Excise was made up of eight commissioners appointed by letters patent under the Great Seal and chaired by a Permanent Secretary. The board was responsible to the Chancellor of the Exchequer for collecting and accounting for all customs and excise revenues and for 'the management of all matters belonging and incidental to such collection'.

The Headquarters Staff had oversight of policy implementation and management, as well as providing central accounting, legal and administrative services; its operation was akin to that of a government department.

The Outdoor Service was divided into geographical areas called collections, each overseen by a collector (a senior official who acted as the board's representative). Initially there were ninety-two collections (formed by merging the previously separate Customs collections and Excise collections) but these were later reduced: to thirty-nine by 1930, twenty-nine by 1971. The collections were subdivided into districts (each overseen by a surveyor) within which were several stations, each staffed by one or more officers of Customs and Excise. In each collection, the stations were responsible for assessment of duty while the collector's office focused on collection of revenue.

The Waterguard carried out preventive work; it worked closely alongside the Outdoor Service but was separately constituted with its own management structure and its own geographical 'divisions'.

After 1971, management structures were streamlined and unified, with Civil Service grades replacing the previous disparate ranking structures in most areas. At the same time the Waterguard ceased to operate as a separate body, although uniformed customs officers continued to be involved in preventive work.

=== Personnel ===
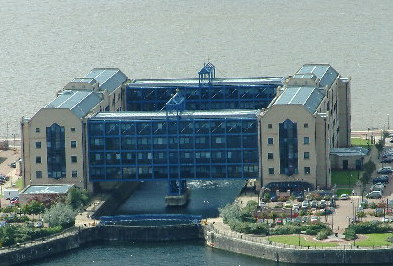
HMCE Office, Queen's Dock, Liverpool; opened 1993, closed 2012.

The majority of the Headquarters Staff belonged to the Civil Service grades (generally clerical, executive, and secretariat).

The main grades in the outfield were: clerical staff, Officer of C&E, Allowanced Officer of C&E (the allowance was for taking on certain administrative duties e.g. rostering), Surveyor of C&E – all of which were at 'district' level and then assistant collector, deputy collector and collector (regional management). The regions of London Port and Liverpool (later 'London Airports' was added) were graded as slightly higher than the others. All grades were amalgamated and incorporated into the general Civil Service grades in 1971.

Established in the mid-twentieth century to combat fraud and drug smuggling, the Investigation Division was headed by a Chief Investigation Officer, equivalent in rank to a collector, assisted by a Deputy Chief Investigation Officer and a number of assistant chief investigation officers. Each team of, usually, six was headed by a senior investigation officer (equivalent to a surveyor or SEO) and consisted of a mix of investigation officers and higher investigation officers.

Officers of the Waterguard had their own rank structure, namely: Assistant Preventive Officer (APO), Preventive Officer (PO) and Chief Preventive Officer (CPO); all these routinely wore uniform (see below). Higher grades were the Assistant Superintendent and Superintendent, neither of whom wore a uniform. After 1971 the Waterguard was renamed the Preventive Service and integrated into the main structure of HMCE. POs were renamed Executive Officers (Preventive) and APOs Assistant Officers (Preventive).

Customs and Excise officers had authority throughout the country, including the powers of entry to premises and of arrest (though at times requiring the presence of a police constable).

HMCE had an overall headcount of 23,000 staff in 2004 before the merger with Inland revenue.

==== Uniform ====
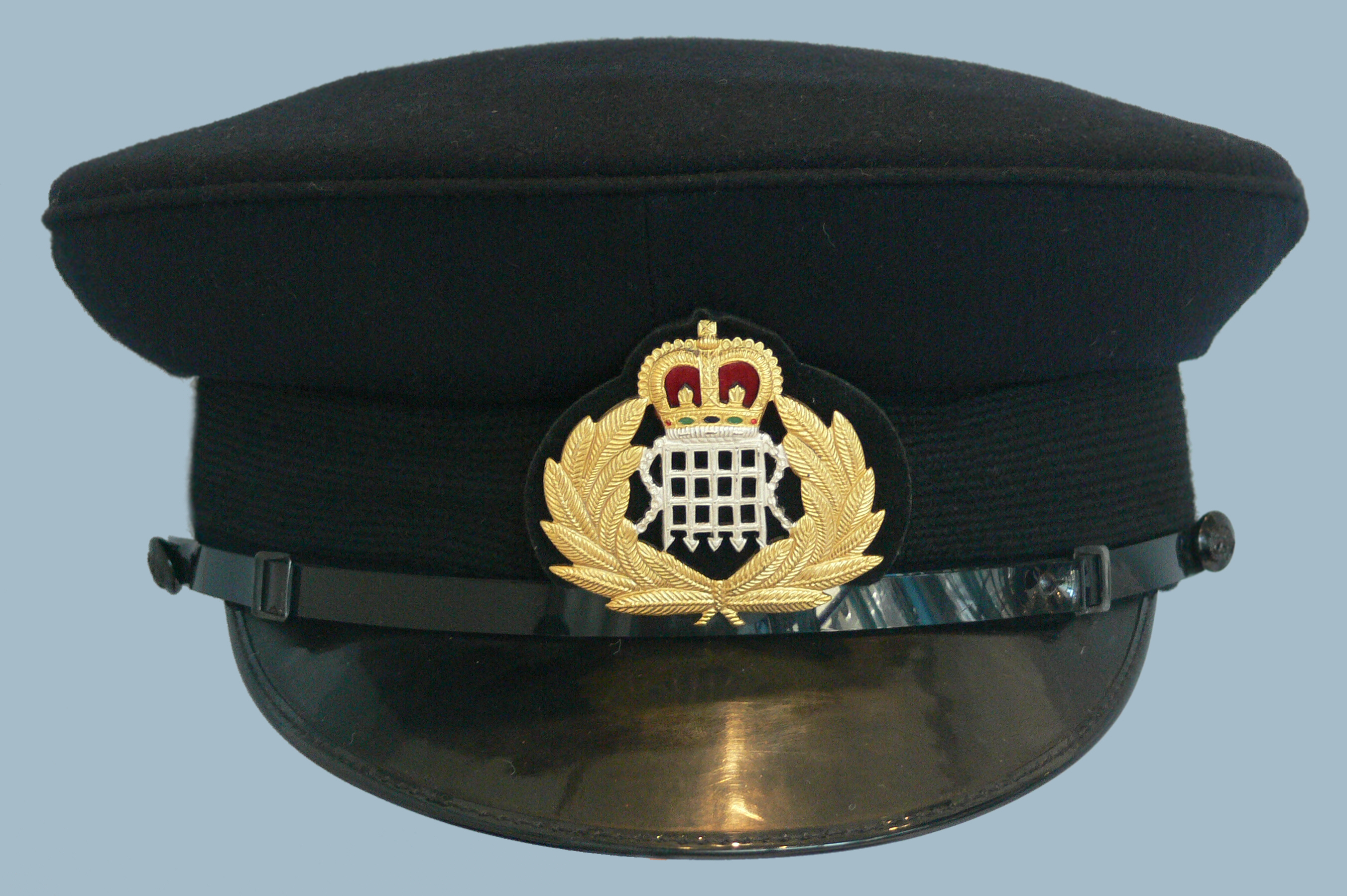
Peaked cap as worn by Preventive officers when in uniform.

The uniform worn by officers of the Waterguard was identical to Royal Navy officers’ uniform with the exception of the cap badge (a crowned portcullis with flying chains), buttons (a crown rather than the fouled anchor) and the cuff rank lace (which only extended halfway round the cuff, rather than full cuff as in the Royal Navy (this possibly believed to be a WWII cost-cutting measure)).

Prior to 1946, Chief Preventive Officers (CPO) wore two and a half gold stripes on their uniform while Preventive Officers (PO) had one stripe and Assistant Preventive Officers (APO) no stripe. After that date CPOs wore three stripes, POs two stripes and APOs one stripe. All uniformed grades wore a Navy curl; CPOs were further distinguished by having a row of gold oak leaves on the peak of the cap.

After 1971 the same uniform was adopted by uniformed officers of the Preventive Service.

== Corporate history ==
The Board of Customs, responsible for collecting duties levied on imported goods, and the Board of Excise, responsible for raising revenue from inland taxes, were both established in the 17th century. The raising of excise duties also dates from this time, but the levying of customs duties has a far longer history, the first written reference being found in an eighth-century charter of King Aethelbald.

Following the Act of Union 1707 a separate Scottish Board of Customs and Scottish Excise Board were constituted; a century later separate boards were likewise established for Ireland. By the Customs and Excise Act 1823 (4 Geo. 4. c. 23), dated 2 May 1823, these and the English boards were consolidated to form a single Board of Excise and a single Board of Customs for the whole United Kingdom.

These boards (and their successors) were made up of commissioners, appointed under the Great Seal of the Realm.

=== HM Customs ===
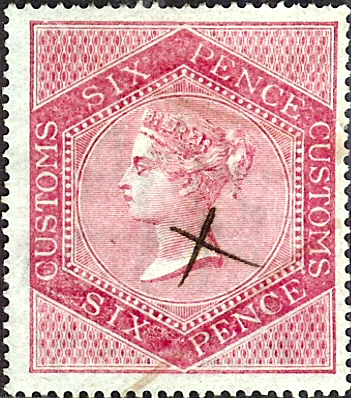
A British Victorian six pence customs revenue stamp.

Originally, the term customs meant any customary payments or dues of any kind (for example, to the king, or a bishop, or the church), but later became restricted to duties payable to the king on the import or export of goods. A centralised English customs system can be traced to the Winchester Assize of Customs of 1203, in the reign of King John, from which time customs were to be collected and paid to the state Treasury. HM Customs was established on a more permanent basis with the passing of legislation in the reign of King Edward I: the nova custuma of 1275. Alongside the nova custuma (which was levied on exported wool and leather) duty was levied on imported goods; from the 14th century this became known as tonnage and poundage.

==== The Board of Customs ====
A Board of Customs was effectively created by the Long Parliament on 21 January 1643 under the Ordinance concerning the Customs for the continuance of the ordinance of concerning the subsidy of Tonnage and Poundage from 1 March 1643, to 25 March 1644. Under this ordinnace the regulation of the collection of customs was entrusted to a parliamentary committee; however in 1662 Parliament reverted to the farming system, until a permanent board was finally established in 1671 by letters patent.

=== HM Revenue of Excise ===
Excise duties are inland duties levied on articles at the time of their manufacture, such as alcoholic drinks and tobacco. Excise duties were first levied in England in 1643, during the Commonwealth (initially on beer, cider, spirits and soap); later, duties were levied on such diverse commodities as salt, paper and bricks.

For a time, the Excise Board was also responsible for collecting the duty levied on imports of beverages such as rum, brandy and other spirits, as well as tea, coffee, chocolate and cocoa beans. Prior to payment of duty, these items were often stored in a bonded warehouse, where excise officers could assess and measure them.

==== The Board of Excise ====
A Board of Excise was likewise established by the Long Parliament under the "Excise Ordinance" of 1643 (Ordinance for the speedy raising and levying of moneys by way of charge or impost upon several commodities). After 1662 excise revenue was farmed for the most part, until the board was established on a permanent footing in 1683.

==== The Board of Inland Revenue ====
In 1849 the Inland Revenue Board Act 1849 merged the Board of Excise with the Board of Stamps and Taxes to create a new Board of Inland Revenue.

=== HM Customs and Excise ===
The combined Board of Customs and Excise was formed by the Revenue Act 1909 which transferred responsibility for collection of excise duties from the Board of Inland Revenue to the Board of Customs.

=== HM Revenue and Customs ===
HM Customs and Excise was not responsible for collecting direct taxes: that was the job of the Inland Revenue. In March 2004, the O'Donnell review called for the merger of Customs and Excise with Inland Revenue; in the 2004 Budget, Gordon Brown, the Chancellor of the Exchequer, announced that the merger would go ahead, and the merged body (HM Revenue and Customs) was implemented by the Commissioners for Revenue and Customs Act 2005.

== Border enforcement ==
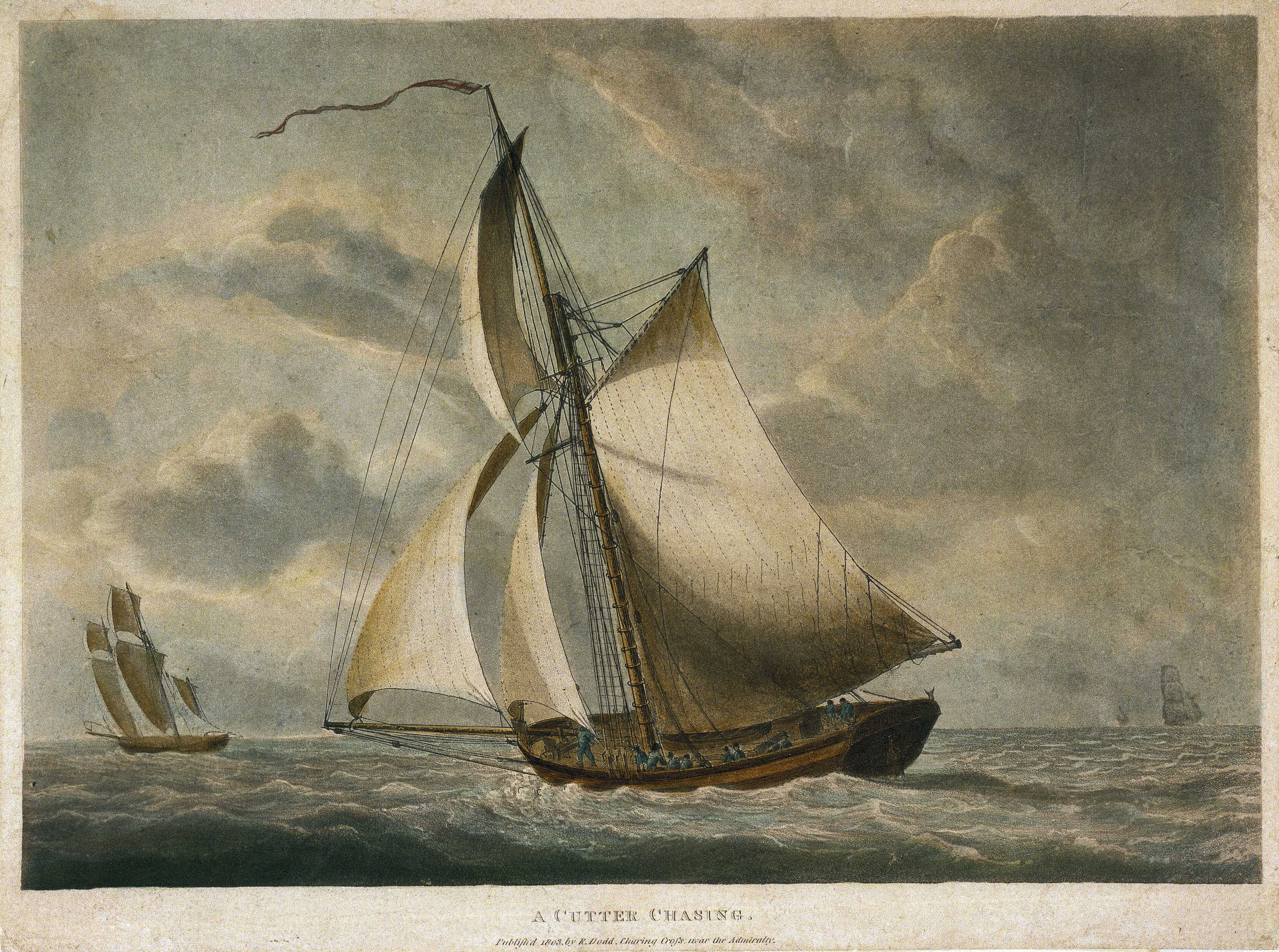
A Revenue Cutter pursuing a suspect vessel, 1803

For centuries, combatting smuggling had been part of the job of revenue officers. In the late 17th century, a concerted effort was made to combat this growing problem; land-based Riding Officers were employed to patrol the coast on horseback, while Revenue cutters were provided to enable officers to intercept vessels involved in smuggling at sea.

=== The Waterguard ===
In 1809 an organisation called the Preventive Water Guard was formed, independent of HM Customs, as a specialist service to combat smuggling. In 1822 it was brought together with the Riding Officers and Cutter service to form a new body (under the authority of HM Customs) named the Coast Guard. In 1856, however, authority over the Coast Guard was transferred from the Customs to the Admiralty.

In 1891 a specialist Waterguard service was re-established within HM Customs, dedicated to rummaging vessels and combatting smuggling.

=== The Cutter Service ===
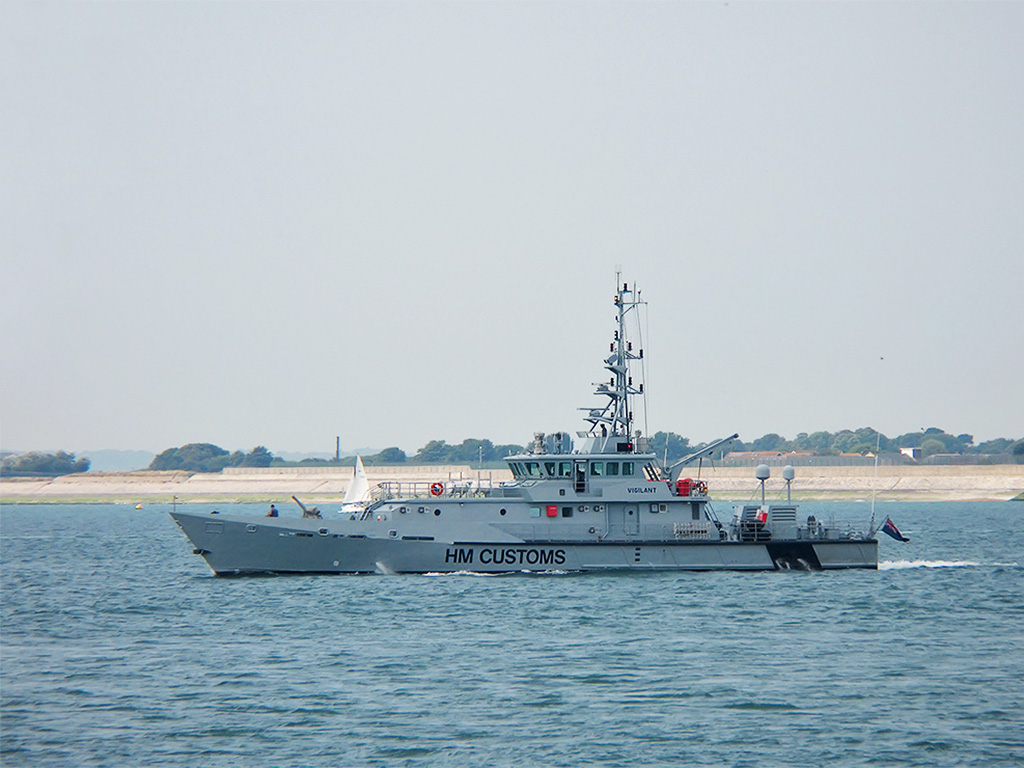
HM Revenue Cutter Vigilant, launched in 2003; the twelfth customs vessel to bear the name.

Following the transfer of the Coastguard to the Admiralty, HM Customs had found itself bereft of sea-going vessels. For the first part of the twentieth century, HMCE made do with a single revenue cruiser, the Vigilant (which served more as a flagship for the Commissioners than as a practical deterrent). After the Second World War, however, the need for active vessels was again recognised and suitable craft were purchased from the Admiralty. By 1962 HMCE had four fast launches in service, crewed by officers of the Waterguard (many of whom had seen active service in the Royal Navy); by 1980 eight further vessels had been acquired.

In the 21st century, a fleet of Customs Cutters (latterly 42 metre Damen patrol vessels) continued to operate throughout UK territorial waters inspecting vessels for Prohibited and restricted goods and increasingly immigration matters

=== After the 2005 merger ===
In 2005, the border enforcement functions of HMCE were transferred (along with the organisation responsible for them) to HMRC; but in 2008 they were again transferred (at least in part) to the new UK Border Agency of the Home Office, which due to various failings was itself disbanded in 2012, whereupon a new UK Border Force was established with border enforcement responsibilities and powers.

== Notable Customs and Excise officers ==
Historically, some of the more well-known figures to have served as Customs officers or Excise men are Robert Burns, Geoffrey Chaucer, William Congreve, Daniel Defoe, John Dryden, Thomas Paine and Adam Smith. Other literary figures included William Allingham, John Oldmixon, Matthew Prior and Maurice Walsh. A number of senior officers in London went on to serve as Lord Mayor, including Sir Nicholas Brembre, Sir William Walworth and Sir Richard ('Dick') Whittington.

== See also ==
- H.M. Customs and Excise Collection. A collection of revenue stamps of H.M.C.E. in the British Library Philatelic Collections.
- HM Customs & Excise National Museum (part of the Merseyside Maritime Museum)
- Sovereign Base Areas Customs
- Prise - an early form of duty paid in kind (e.g. wine prise, which was payable to the king's butler)
- Butlerage - successor to the above, payable in cash
- Tunnage and poundage - a further duty on wine (initially 2s per tun) and other items (initially 6d in the £)
- Cocket - a customs seal signifying that payment of duty has been made and other requirements met
