= Riding officer =

Smuggling enforcement occupation

Riding Officer was an occupation common during the 18th century around the coastlines of Britain. The principal duty of the office was to patrol the coast within their predefined riding range to suppress smuggling. Their duties included meeting and corresponding with the other riding officers either in person or by letter, and inquiring and learning if there were any smuggled goods upon the coast, or landed. They were to get the best information regarding this booty, and to acquaint the Officers of the Customs all over the shire. The Riding Officer always kept a journal reporting all his activities.

A Riding Officer was paid between twenty and forty pounds a year, and was forbidden to take fees or gratuities. He was also expected to buy, care for, and accommodate his own horse. He was appointed by a constitution of the Treasury, and had a deputation from the Commissioner of Customs and Excise. He took the oaths of office, and gave bond and security. He received printed instructions for his conduct with his deputation. He endeavored to get information as to any illicit practices, and makes seizures whenever he could.

== Detail ==
In 1671 Charles II had established the Board of Customs and by 1685 there were ten ships patrolling the coast between Yarmouth and Bristol. On land, a force of mounted customs officers — called "riding officers" — was established in 1690. The first riding officers initially only patrolled the south coast, however the force was totally inadequate for the job, with only eight men managing the whole of the Kent coastline. By 1698 there was realisation that the mounted revenue men were not up to the task, so the scope of the force (now called the Landguard) was widened, and in Kent their numbers were initially increased to 50 and later to 300.

The riding officers were hampered by the fact that their attempt at preventing smuggling was land based. The smaller patrol routes were necessary in areas that were particularly rife for smuggling such as East Sussex and Robin Hood's Bay in Yorkshire. Their job was to venture out in all weathers and ride back and forth looking out for smugglers, suspicious ships moored offshore or small boats bringing in contraband. So eventually, a Waterguard was also established, and around the start of the 18th century, twenty-one vessels were responsible for patrolling the coasts.

The 18th century opened with England still reeling from recent revelations about the extent of illegal exports of wool to France. In 1697, eight 'owlers' (illegal exporters rather than smugglers who were illegal importers) were earmarked for solemn impeachment. They escaped by making a full confession and paying a total of £20,000 in fines. Parliament then rushed through an act forbidding anyone who lived within a fifteen-mile distance from the sea from buying wool unless he could produce documentary evidence that he intended to sell it inland from the 'exclusion zone'. To enforce the legislation, the government appointed a number of 'riding officers'. The first surveyor general of riding officers. Captain Henry Baker, wanted to mount a vigorous campaign against the owlers. Among his plans was the hiring of spies and double agents in Calais and Dieppe. During his incumbency wool smuggling in Sussex and Kent was drastically reduced. In 1703, he was sufficiently confident to recommend that the number of riding officers could be reduced to save money. Unfortunately he was soon proved wrong but his successor lacked his crusading zeal. In any case, after the Act of Union 1707 anti-smuggling resources were switched away from England to Scotland. By the Georgian era the system had spread to cover the entire country.

When Daniel Defoe rode through Hythe towards Rye in the 1720s he saw riding officers and dragoons searching the marshes for wool smugglers '... as if they were huntsmen beating up their game ...' Though the officers sometimes scored successes, they were usually so outnumbered that they could only stand and watch as the wool was carried on board ship straight from the horses' backs, and taken immediately to France.

A riding officer's duties included tackling the bands of smugglers (which would often greatly outnumber him) wielding just a cutlass and pistol, he could if he deemed it necessary fetch soldiers to assist in the arrest. This was a rare occurrence as the isolated and exposed coastlines common to smuggling were often many, many miles from any garrison or barracks. Roads and communications were so poor that troops could take days to arrive. Indeed, in Yorkshire the roads were so bad that even the pay packet for the Riding Officer sometimes failed to get through. In January 1722, a customs officer at Whitby sent a plaintive message back to headquarters: 'if you have now got money I beg you'll favour me with a line that I may send for it, for our officers be in great want having rec'd no salaries since last midsummer quarter.' He was also responsible for prosecuting any captured felons, financing the court case from his own pocket.

Because of the known ineffectiveness of the customs officials at the ports, much was expected of the riding officers of the land guard. Mounted patrols were particularly important in the fight against smugglers in wartime when the navy had other duties. Riding officers in the north of England were particularly involved in guarding the passes from Scotland into England. In peacetime the riding officers were supposed to co-ordinate closely with the cutters at sea. But the land guard never made a serious dent in contraband activity. The central government did not provide enough money to employ a full-time force of professionals. As a result, the posts of riding officers were filled by apothecaries, brewers, and other tradesmen, who carried out their duties in their spare time in a manner totally convenient to themselves, falsifying records if necessary. Some were in league with the smugglers they were supposed to be tracking down. But not even the honest ones were brave or numerous enough to deal with armed smuggling gangs. As a contemporary remarked: 'Nor could they be increased to render effectual service unless one half of the inhabitants could be hired to watch the other.'

It was an extremely dangerous job and often resulted in the officer being severely beaten and often murdered. If the Riding Officer did confront a crowd of smugglers, he was often the loser. In 1740 Thomas Carswell was shot as he tried to arrest members of the notoriously violent Hawkhurst Gang who operated on the south coast of England between Dorset and Kent. The following year at Lydd, two Officers were seized by the smugglers they were supposed to be pursuing, trussed up and taken to Boulogne-sur-Mer. The next night they were returned and reunited with their horses which, in the meantime, had been used to transport the smuggled goods. A single riding officer was rash enough to intervene at Hurst Beach near Southampton when fourteen armed smugglers were running a cargo. He suffered concussion of the skull and weeks in hospital from the thrashing he took. In places such as Robin Hood's Bay and Rye, East Sussex, everyone would have been part of the business of smuggling. It was part of the local economy. In the 18th century Robin Hood's Bay had one of the highest per capita incomes in the kingdom. Strangely enough no one wanted that to stop. What made the position even worse was that the riding officer was always recruited from the area to which he was assigned. This made him a social outcast amongst his own family and friends (as most of the villagers would be hiding the goods or a member of the smuggling fraternity themselves). It was a very lonely vocation, having to ride out every night in all weathers for hours at a time looking for suspicious activity not knowing if you would be returning home safely.

It was notoriously difficult to get convictions in local courts as the juries were either sympathetic to the smugglers or took part in the activity themselves. Even the local Justice of the Peace might be in the pay of the criminals or making a petty profit from the contraband. A Riding Officer could theoretically earn a bonus (sometimes upward of £20) for the conviction of a smuggler. The catch was, he had to pay for the costs of the prosecution. With the chances of a conviction so low, it was hardly worth the effort in the first place.

So the Riding Officer was cold, wet, outgunned and poorly paid and in essence useless. In his annual report in 1783, Sir William Musgrave, Commissioner of Customs, said that Riding Officers were 'of very little service, tho a great Burthen to the Revenue'.

== See also ==
- HM Coastguard
- HM Customs and Excise
- Bow Street Runners, London's first professional police organization, founded in 1749
- Jonathan Wild
- Charles Hitchen, one of Wild's rivals
- Thief-taker
