= Lagos State Waterways Authority =

Lagos State Waterways Authority (LASWA) is the agency in charge of boats, ferries operations and water transportation in Lagos state. The agency provide alternative to escaping Lagos traffic by overseeing water transport. LASWA partnered with the Dolphin Swim School to train 100 students across 4 public schools on water safety and swimming guides through the Water Savvy Kids Programme in 2021.

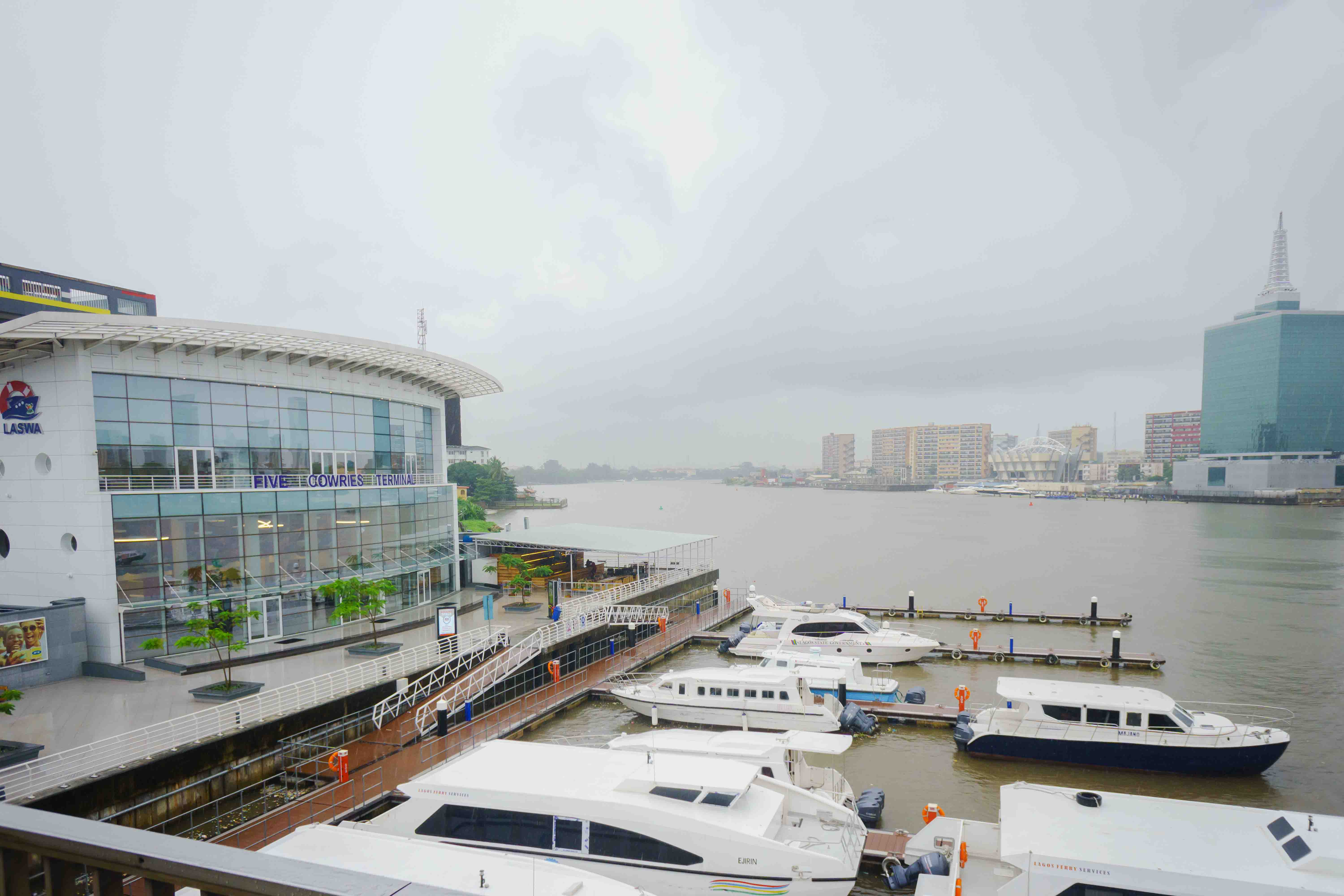

== History ==
According to a press release by the General Manager, Oluwadamilola Emmanuel in 2021, LASWA recruited new water guards who were distributed across different terminals and inland water ways in Lagos and trained to ensure safety of boat operators and ferry passengers.

In 2023, due to high water waves obstructing free movement of ferries, the water authority suspended her activities at Ipakodo ferry terminal, Ikorodu to ensure safety of the users in that area. Also in 2023, Lagos State Government, through the Ministry of Waterfront Infrastructure Development, handed over Ijegun-Egba, Liverpool, Isalu-Ajido, Marina Badagry, and Ilashe Jetties to LASWA to provide alternative to land transport to serve as source of business for the residents. LASWA collaborated with National Emergency Management Agency (NEMA) in further ensuring safety within water areas in the state in 2024.
