= Iree =

Town in Osun State, Nigeria

Coordinates: 7°56′10″N 4°43′30″E

- Town
- Interactive map of Iree

Population
  - Total: 32,336
- Postal code: 231115

Iree (also Ire or Iree Alalubosa) is a Yoruba town in the north-eastern part of Osun State, Nigeria.

Iree is one of the major towns in the Boripe Local Government Area of Osun State. It is located on the Osogbo-Ila-Orangun road, about 30 kilometres (19 mi) from Osogbo and 8 kilometres (5.0 mi) from Ikirun. It is surrounded by the following towns: Ikirun, Iba, Eripa, Ada, Aagba, Ororuwo, Obaagun and Iragbiji. Iree and many other towns in the same region have their names beginning with the letter 'I' and so, are usually described as being located in the 'I' District. Such towns include Ikirun, Iba, Ila Orangun, Inisa, Iragbiji, Iresi, Itake and Imoleke. Iree is also situated in a valley amidst seven prominent hills which, in the past, have served as natural fortresses in times of war — primarily during the Yoruba civil wars of the nineteenth century and most especially, from hostile neighbouring communities. The seven hills are: Eru Hill, Ilako Hill, Ipole Hill, Adanimole Hill, Aganna Hill, Apo Hill and Maye Hill. The 7-hill topography of the town makes it an attraction to tourists.

== History ==
According to historians, Prince Dr. Samuel Omotoso and Prince Oyeyemi Omotoso – who were commissioned to document the history of Iree by the Iree Progressive Union (1992) – Iree was founded by Olaromoye, an immigrant from Ipee, a town near Offa in Kwara State. He had first settled on Ipole Hill. Soon, many people joined him and the town quickly developed into a big settlement. The earliest people were farmers. The nearby location where they found most suitable for their farming and hunting later became Eripa town because Lakadi, the founder of Eripa not only joined them at that hunting location but also settled permanently there at Eripa. The kolanut and palm trees the Iree people planted in Eripa in succeeding years remain there till today as heritage to their descendants.

Aided by four perennial streams that supply water needed for irrigation, the town soon became very popular for three commodities - black-eyed peas, vegetables and leafy onions. Because Iree produced the leafy onions in commercial quantities, the town soon became known around its vicinity as "Iree Alalubosa" (i.e. Iree, the land of leafy onions). Amongst Iree's four perennial streams, River Egudu was the town's greatest asset because of its constant supply of water all year round. It then became a rest area, even for travellers. That is why Iree descendants today are poetically praised as "Omo Larooye, omo Arolu, omo Akoisa - Legudu, Ayabu-ero, meaning, "Child of Larooye, and of Arolu, and of Akoisa, who abide by the Egudu river, a free source of refreshing drink for passers-by". The Egudu River is near the present site of Iree Baptist High School. Hunting was also one of the commonest activities the earliest Iree settlers engaged in and many important places in Iree today got their names from the celebration of heroic deeds of Iree's first hunters. For example, using the jagged spear (Asa) which was their commonest hunting weapon, Arolu, the founder of the town, at a nearby river killed an elephant. Thus the river was named Odo Asa (Asa River). The hill where Arolu's hunting bag was usually hung was named Oke Apo (the bag hill). The actual tree on that hill on which Arolu hung his hunting bag was an Ire tree. So, Iree was named after that tree. Similarly, the place where Arolu's associates killed their first elephant was named Ibiti a ti ri erin pa (i.e. the place where we killed an elephant). Later, it was shortened to –"A r'erinpa", then "Erinpa" and finally, Eripa. Eripa town shares an indisputable closeness with Iree town up till today.

The founding and establishment of Iree was the handiwork of three brothers, namely: Larooye, Arolu and Oyekun. This trio has over the years become known in Iree's oral tradition as "the three great brothers". Larooye was the first to settle at the location that became Iree today. Larooye was an immigrant from Ipee, and a son of the Onipe. His other brothers were Arolu, Oyekun, Akoisa and Olaolu. The Onipe himself had migrated from Oyo with fanfare. The Alaafin (King) of Oyo offered Onipe the position of a provincial Oba (king) at the Ekunosi sector of his domain which was around Offa, a town in Kwara State. He was invested with the Ejigba or beaded collar, Opa-Ileke or beaded staff and other royal insignia. At Ipee, the Onipe was blessed with many children. One of them, the then Prince Arolu, was plagued by one misfortune after another. Some of his wives did not conceive while the others bore infants who died soon after birth. So he decided to leave Ipee and seek his fortune elsewhere. The oracle he consulted before leaving Ipee had advised him to move towards the Ibolo provincial area of the Alaafin's domain and stop on a hill he would reach after he must have crossed seven thick forests. When he left Ipee, he left with all the rights and privileges of a crowned Oba (king). When he got as far as Offa, he and his entourage stayed a short while with his friend, Ogungbiji Oyerinle, who tried but failed in persuading him to stay permanently in Offa. After he had moved on, he got to Ipole Hill, where he became convinced that it was the chosen place for his settlement. There, he built a shelter and made his living. Thus the town of Iree was born. Today, the descendants of Iree are referred to as Ara Ori-lpole (i.e. people who abide on the Ipole Hill) – Omotoso and Omotoso (1992).

=== Kings that Have ruled in Iree ===
1. Oba Olaromoye – founder and first king
2. Oba Oyekun
3. Oba Akoisa
4. Oba Adegbiji
5. Oba Olupinni
6. Oba Oyetite
7. Oba Iyohanola – he had the shortest reign (1806–1809)
8. Oba Olubonku
9. Oba Ojo Ayagaga – 1867–1878. He was captured by the Fulanis during the Jalumi war of 1878 and died in captivity.
10. Oba Adewusi – 1878–1926. Christianity and Islam became well established in Iree
11. Oba Oyekanmi – 1927–1942
12. Oba Lannite – 1942–1953
13. Oba Ezekiel Olatunji Ajisegiri 1954–1972.
14. Oba Michael Omoloye Omotoso – 1975–2003. He was the first Aree to be crowned.
15. Oba Jimoh Olayonu Olatoyan Olaromoye II – November 27, 2004 – July 8, 2018
16. The town is currently in the process of selecting the next king.

== Climate ==
Iree has a tropical wet and dry climate (Köppen climate classification) with a lengthy wet season and relatively constant temperatures throughout the course of the year. Iree's wet season runs from March through October, though August sees somewhat of a lull in precipitation. This lull nearly divides the wet season into two different wet seasons. The remaining months forms the city's dry season. Like a good portion of West Africa, Iree experiences the harmattan (dry and cold season) between the months of November and February.

== Education ==
The first school in Iree was the Baptist Day School, which was established in 1923. Mr. Samuel Laosebikan from the Ogbomoso Baptist Seminary was posted to serve as the school's first teacher. By 1929, the school had about 104 registered pupils. The school grew quickly in stature and became the only primary institution where pupils from Iree and surrounding communities could complete their primary education. In 1948, Salem Baptist School was established with Mr. J. Ola Orisajinmi as the first teacher. In 1949, Nawarudeen Primary School was established. Since then, many more primary schools have been established in Iree and immediate vicinity. In 1985, Kiddie Varsity Nursery and Primary School (KIDVARC) was established. It was the first Montessori-type nursery/kindergarten School in Iree and neighboring communities. Such type of schools has tremendously advanced the standard of education in those communities. Today, KIDVARC provides standard education at nursery, primary and secondary levels. Another of such nursery school is the Polytechnic Nursery/ Primary School. The school, established in 1987, was conceived by the Iree Polytechnic satellite campus administration to cater primarily for the educational needs of the children of the polytechnics staff. However, its goodwill was extended to the whole community. These two nursery schools have served well in re-awakening true educational virtues among Iree indigenes in general.

The first post-primary school in Iree was Baptist High School, which was established in 1959. On February 16, 1959, the school officially opened with the name, Iree Baptist High School having thirty-two pupils. Also, by 1957, whilst efforts were on to erect blocks of classroom for the new government-approved Iree High School, the Local African Churches in Iree and Iba secured another government approval to establish the African Church Modern School. The school was established in-between both towns. In 1963, a strong disagreement arose between both towns over who had the bigger say in the administration and running of the school. The disagreement eventually led to the break-up of the school and the Iree Local African Church sought another official sanction to establish their own school. In 1964, the school was established along Ikirun road. Because the remaining Iba students in the former jointly owned school were so sparse, the school had to be scrapped.

In 1981, a satellite campus of the Ibadan Polytechnic was sighted in Iree. A plot of land was donated by the community as the site of the institution. Once again, after the site had been cleared and prepared by the government, another argument arose between Iree and Iba as to the ownership of the proposed site. To avoid future re-occurrences of such arguments, the Iree community donated another plot of land along Ada road for the same purpose. They, as well, organized voluntary communal labor to prepare the new site, conduct surveys on it and generally present it to the government in about the same condition the government had reached. At the instance of the creation of the new Osun state in 1991, the school received full autonomy. It became the pride of the town. Today, the Polytechnic awards Diploma and Higher National Diplomas (HND's) in 6 broad categories of education: Information & Communication Technology, Science, Financial Studies, Management Studies, and Engineering.

== School ==
In iree, there is a polytechnic name Osun state polytechnic Iree also known as (Ospoly) the school is founded in 1992, the school award ND and HND certificates

== Healthcare developments ==
The idea to have a clinic/dispensary/maternity center occurred to Rev. E. A. Omilade in 1937 and met the approval and interest of the Iree Progressive Union. In 1944, a community maternity clinic was finally established by the Baptist and named Baptist Welfare Centre. In 1945, Miss Eva M. Sanders, a former classmate to Rev. Omilade was posted by the Baptist mission from Lagos to Ogbomoso. She was approached by Rev. Omilade and was intimated with the problems and progress so far made regarding the center. She agreed to help by visiting Iree frequently and temporarily making use of the First Baptist Church vestry as a clinic and maternity centre. On October 10, 1945, she moved into Iree permanently. She personally supervised the building of the Welfare Centre which today caters for all, regardless of religious preference. By 1967 when Miss Sanders retired home, she had made about 14,809 safe birth deliveries and had trained about 102 maidens as midwives in the centre. The Iree Maternity Centre was established in 1973. The Iree-Eripa Provisional Authority local administrator announced that the government would provide for staff and supply necessary equipment if the town would build the centre by itself. Building materials formally earmarked for the building of the Oba's palace were diverted to this new project and it took just seventeen days for them to complete the erection of the building. Thousands of babies have since been delivered in the Maternity Centre since it opened in 1973. The only dispensary in Iree was established in 1960 by the Ifelodun District Council towards the tail-end of colonial rule in Nigeria. Over the years however, services in the dispensary deteriorated and the place was always in dire need of medical supplies. In recent times however, and due to the establishment of the Polytechnic community in the town, private clinics operating twenty-four-hour services had started springing up. Although services in these private clinics will no doubt be more expensive, their presence improves the standard of healthcare delivery in the town. Also, the installation of electricity in the town in 1980 has, no doubt, facilitated the educational, healthcare and other socio-economic activities of Iree residents.

=== hospitals in iree ===
Among the Comprehensive Health Centre Iree ISALE OFFA 2, Boripe local government primary health care.

Baptist Welfare Hospital ire was also among hospital in iree a private own hospital.
