= Olalekan Rasheed Afolabi =

Nigerian politician

Member of the House of Representatives
- In office 2019–2023
- Constituency: Ifelodun/Boripe/Odo-Otin Federal Constituency

Personal details
- Born: Osun State, Nigeria
- Party: All Progressives Congress (APC)
- Occupation: Politician, Chartered Accountant

Olalekan Rasheed Afolabi is a Nigerian politician and chartered accountant who served as the representative for the Ifelodun/Boripe/Odo-Otin Federal Constituency in Osun State during the 9th National Assembly from 2019 to 2023, under the All Progressives Congress (APC).
