= Osun State College of Health Technology, Ilesa =

College of Health Technology in Osun State

Coordinates: 7.5915°N 4.7419°E

- Motto: Knowledge is Power
- Type: Public
- Established: 1977
- Provost: Dr Lateef Olarewaju, RAHEEM
- Location: Ilesa, Osun State, Nigeria
- Website: https://osunhealthtechilesa.edu.ng

The Osun State College of Health Technology, Ilesa is a State owned professional and multi disciplinary tertiary training institution located in Ilesa town in Ilesa West Local Government Area, Osun State. The college is regulated by the National Board for Technical Education NBTE and Osun State Ministry of Education from which it has full accreditation, as of 2020, under the Osun State House of Assembly (Establishment) Law of 2020.

In 2025, Osun State Governor, Ademola Adeleke appointed Abayomi Adegoke as Chairman of the Governing Council of Osun State College of Health Technology, Ilesa.

== History ==
The Osun State College of Health Technology, Ilesa, was established in 1977 by the Oyo State Ministry of Health and operated under the Secondary Health Care and Training Department of the Oyo State Ministry of Health until the creation of Osun State on 27 August 1991, by the military government of General Ibrahim Babangida. In 2020, the institution gained autonomy, becoming a full-fledged college under the Osun State House of Assembly (Establishment) Law of 2020. In November 2022, the Osun State Assembly passed the University Teaching Hospital and Examination Board Establishment Bills into law, which made provision for the college to be under the supervision of the State Ministry of Education, rather than the Ministry of Health. As it continues to evolve from a monotechnic to a full-fledged polytechnic under the bill tagged "Osun State College of Health Technology and Management Sciences Establishment Bill 2024," its primary objective remains to produce competent and efficient graduates who can provide modern primary healthcare services.

== Available courses ==
- Health Assistant
- Health Technician
- Waste Management
- Pharmacy Technician
- Dental Surgery Technician
- Medical Laboratory Technician
- Health Education and Promotion
- Community Health Extension Worker
- Health Assistance Abridgement Courses
- Junior Community Health Extension Worker
- Transport Management in Health Care Systems
- Advanced Certificate in Biomedical Maintenance Technology
- Logistics and Supply Chain Management of Health Commodities
- ND&HND Environmental Health Technology
- ND&HND Health Information Management
- ND Epidemiology and Disease Control
- ND Dental Surgery Technology
- ND Medical Imaging & X-ray
- ND Nutrition and Dietetics
- ND Dispensing Opticianry
- ND&HND Dental Therapy

Medical Store Administration:

- Medical Store Technician
- Medical Store Attendant

== See also ==
- Osun State
- Osun State University
- Osun State Ministry of Education
- Ikirun College of Health Technology
