= Eko-Ende =

- Location within Nigeria
- Coordinates: 7.943177°N 4.592922°E
- Country: Nigeria
- State: Osun State
- Time zone: UTC+1 (WAT)
- Postal code: 231110

Eko-Ende (or Eko Ende, Eko-Ende) is a community in the Ifelodun Local Government Area of Ọṣun State, Nigeria.

== Location ==
Eko-Ende has a tropical climate, with an average temperature of 26 °C (79 °F). Average annual rainfall is 1,254 millimetres (49.4 in), with peaks in July and September, and little rain between November and February. Eko-Ende lies just west of the town of Ikirun. The farming community lies on the Ikirun-Ogbomoso road, in-between Eko-Ajala and Ore communities.

== Dam ==
The Eko-Ende Dam on the Otin River was impounded in 1973 to form a reservoir with a capacity of 5.5 MCM. The headworks were designed to supply potable water to the communities of Oba, Eko-Ende, Eko-Ajala, Ikirun, Iragbiji and Okuku. The dam is an earth structure, completed in 1979, with a capacity of 910,000 cubic metres (32,000,000 cu ft).

== History ==
The Jalumi War of 1 November 1878 took place in the hilly country of the northeast of Osun State in the area that includes Ikirun, Iba, Inisa, Okuku and Eko-Ende. It was one of the series of civil wars in Yoruba land between 1793 and 1893. The traditional ruler is the Elende of Eko-Ende. As of 2013, Oba Abdul-Rauf Adebayo Ajiboye held this title.

== King ==
In March 2022 the former king Elende of Eko-Ende Oba Abdul-Rauf Adebayo Ajiboye joined is acestors.

=== New Monarch ===
The kingmarker of Eko-Ende announced Adekunle Abdul-Waheed Babatunde has the new king.
