= Osun State Ministry of Health =

Ministry in Osun State, Nigeria

Ministry overview
- Jurisdiction: Government of Osun State
- Headquarters: State Government Secretariat
- Ministry executive: Hon. Jola Akintola, Commissioner
- Website: https://www.osunstate.gov.ng/ministries/ministry-of-health/

The Osun State Ministry of Health oversees the development and implementation of health policies and programs in Osun State, Nigeria. The Ministry is responsible for coordinating, supervising, and regulating various activities in the health sector to deliver quality healthcare services to citizens.

In conjunction with the Osun State House of Assembly, the Ministry helped create the Osun Health Insurance Scheme (OHIS), established by the state government to improve citizens' access to healthcare at a minimal cost. The scheme aims to make healthcare management and insurance more accessible to the people of Osun State.

== See also ==
- List of governors of Osun State
- Ikirun College of Health Technology
- Osun State University
- Osun Health Insurance Scheme
