= Popoola =

- Gender: Male
- Language: Yoruba

Origin
- Word/name: Nigeria
- Meaning: The avenue to success.

listen

Popoola is a surname meaning "The avenue to success". Notable people with the surname include:

- Aaron Popoola (born 1942), Ghanaian boxer
- Akintunde Popoola, Nigerian Anglican bishop
- Anjola Popoola (born 2007), English footballer
- Dotun Popoola (born 1981), Nigerian artist
- James Afolabi Popoola, Nigerian Anglican bishop
- Labode Popoola (born 1960), Nigerian academic
- Natanya Popoola (born 2002), English singer-songwriter
- Oladayo Popoola (born 1944), Nigerian major-general
- Olúmìdé Pópóọlá, is a London-based Nigerian-German writer
- Saheed Popoola (born 1971), Nigerian politician
- Saliu Popoola (born 1994), Nigerian footballer
- Sunday Popoola, Nigerian pastor
- Temi Popoola (born 1980), Nigerian financial services executive
- Tolulope Popoola, Nigerian author
