= Iba, Osun State =

Iba
- Location within Nigeria
- Coordinates: 7.969051°N 4.703880°E
- Country: Nigeria
- State: Osun State
- Local Government Area: Ifelodun
- Time zone: UTC+1 (WAT)
- Postal Code: 231111

Iba is a community in the Ifelodun Local Government Area of Ọṣun State, Nigeria.

== Location ==
Iba is in the Ifelodun Local Government Area in the northeast of Ọṣun State a few kilometers northeast of Ikirun, east of Inisa and southeast of Okuku.

== History ==
The Jalumi War of 1 November 1878 took place in the hilly country of the northeast of Osun State in the area that includes Ikirun, Iba, Inisa, Okuku and Eko-Ende. It was one of the series of civil wars in Yorubaland between 1793 and 1893. The town is mentioned in a report of 1911 of a visit by the resident Captain Cyril Hammond Elgee and the Ibadan chiefs to hear a boundary dispute between Iba and nearby Okuku. The dispute was unresolved until the late 1930s. The ruling house of Iba claims that they came from Ife long before the people of Ikuku came to the region.

In 2011, a dispute over which ruling house should become the next traditional ruler, or Eburu of Iba, became a subject of litigation after the demise of Oba Ibrahim Bamigbade. Olugbuyi ruling house claimed that the title should alternate between the Olugbuyi and Okiti ruling houses, and that the Ijadunoye and Alamu were families in the Okiti ruling house. Alamu and Ijadunoye ruling houses claimed that the Ijadunoye and Alamu were separate ruling houses and there had never been any Okiti ruling house in Iba history, and the stool should rotate to them too. in 2014, Justice Afolabi of High Court of Osogbo ruled in favor of Alamu Ruling House and ordered the installation of Prof. Adekunle Okunoye of Alamu Ruling House having been duly nominated by his ruling house and unanimously approved by the kingmakers.

== Facilities ==
The community has a primary health care center. St. Peter's Anglican church is located in Iba, in the Diocese of Osun of the Church of Nigeria, there's also other churches like the Methodist Church, Baptist Church, Catholic and also The Redeem Christian church. The St. Peters Anglican Church was founded in 1903 by the missionary John Mackay. The Iba MicroFinance Bank, formerly the Iba Community Bank, was registered in February 2008. In 2013 a plan to train youth was announced, with a training center in Iba. Courses would include fashion design, hairdressing, shoe making, barbering, event decorating and soap making.
