= Adetunji Abidemi Olusoji =

Nigerian politician

Adetunji Abidemi Olusoji (born 14 October 1974) is a Nigerian politician from Osun State who is serving as the representative of Odo-Otin/Ifelodun/Boripe Federal Constituency in the 10th National Assembly. He was elected to the House of Representatives under the People's Democratic Party (PDP) during 2023 general election.

== Early life and education ==
Olusoji was born on 14 October 1974. He is from Osun State, Nigeria and holds an MBA in Finance.
