= Otin River =

River of Nigeria

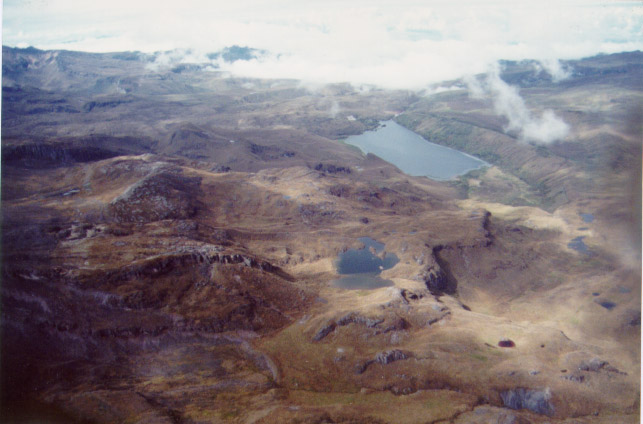

Location
- Country: Nigeria
- Region: Odo Otin LGA, Osun State

Physical characteristics
- Mouth
  - coordinates: 7.937343°N 4.595186°E
- Length: 36 km (22 mi)
- Basin size: 475 km^{2} (183 sq mi)

Basin features
- River system: Erinle River

The Otin River is a river in Inisa, Osun State, Nigeria. It is impounded by the Eko-Ende Dam.

== Legend ==
According to Yoruba mythology, the orisha Otin is personified in the Otin River. As a historical figure, before she became deified, she is believed to have once protected the town of Inisa from invasion by its enemies, and the townspeople now worship her as a result. Otin was originally from the town of Otan, but came to Inisa to help fight against invasions by its neighbors.

== Region ==
The Otin River crosses the 950 square kilometres (370 sq mi) Odo Otin Local Government Area in the northeast of Osun state, and gives it its name. The river flows through rugged country, with elevations ranging from 35 to 400 metres (115 to 1,312 ft) above sea level. Rainfall in the area is about 1,400 millimetres (55 in), with the rainy season lasting from April to November. Land cover is partly tropical rainforest, but there is also widespread rotational bush farming and cash crops like cocoa, kola and plantain are grown around the settlements.

== Course ==
The Otin River is 36 kilometres (22 mi) long, with a peak discharge of 76.01 cubic metres (2,684 cu ft) per second. The drainage basin covers 475 square kilometres (183 sq mi). It is a tributary of the Erinle River. The Eko-Ende Dam in the Irepodun LGA on the Otin River was impounded in 1973 to form a reservoir with a capacity of 5.5 MCM. The headworks were designed to supply potable water to the communities of Inisa, Oba, Eko-Ende, Eko-Ajala, Ikirun, Iragbiji and Okuku. When the dam was built it flooded farmlands of the Oba people. As a quid-pro-quo, piped water was supplied to Oba. Downstream, the Erinle Dam in the Olorunda LGA is an extension of the old Ede Dam on the Erinle River. The reservoir behind the Ede-Ernle dam extends about 12 kilometres (7.5 mi) north along the Ernle River and covers the lowest portion of the Otin River.
