= Abdur-Rasheed Ayotunde Olabomi =

Nigerian traditional ruler

Oba Abdur-Rasheed Ayotunde Olabomi
- Aragbiji of Iragbiji

15th Aragbiji of Iragbiji
- Reign: 22 May 2008 – present
- Coronation: 22 May 2008
- Born: Abdur-Rasheed Ayotunde Olabomi; October 29, 1962 (age 64); Iragbiji, Osun State, Nigeria
- House: Ajibode
- Religion: Islam

Oba Abdur-Rasheed Ayotunde Olabomi, known by his royal title Odundun IV, is a Nigerian traditional ruler who serves as the 15th Aragbiji of Iragbiji, in Boripe Local Government Area, Osun State, Nigeria. He ascended the throne on 22 May 2008. Before his installation, he worked in the local government service, where he rose to the position of Director of Personnel Management. He was appointed Pro-Chancellor and Chairman of the Governing Council of the Federal University of Agriculture, Abeokuta (FUNAAB) by the Federal Government of Nigeria in 2024.

== Early life and education ==
Abdur-Rasheed was born on 29 October 1962 into the Ajibode ruling house of Iragbiji, in present-day Osun State, Nigeria.

He began his primary education at Local Authority Primary School, Poika Luku, in Ife South Local Government Area, and completed it at Local Education Authority Primary School, Kawo, Kaduna, in 1975. He subsequently attended Oke-Iragbiji Grammar School, where he completed his secondary education in 1980.

In 1983, he gained admission to Adeyemi College of Education, Ondo, where he studied History Education and graduated in 1987. He later attended the University of Ilorin, obtaining a Master of Public Administration degree in 1994. In 2006, he enrolled in the National Open University of Nigeria to study Law but did not complete the programme following his installation as the Aragbiji.

== Career ==
Before becoming a traditional ruler, Abdur-Rasheed worked in the public service. He joined the Local Government Service Commission in Oyo State in 1989 and continued his career in Osun State following its creation in 1991. He served in various local government administrations and rose to the position of Director of Personnel Management before his ascension to the throne in 2008.

In an interview with Nigerian Tribune in February 2018, he described his previous career in the local government service and his involvement in community administration before becoming the traditional ruler. He also discussed the challenges of traditional leadership and the development priorities of Iragbiji.

== Reign ==
Abdur-Rasheed was installed as the 15th Aragbiji of Iragbiji on 22 May 2008. His accession placed him at the head of the traditional institution responsible for representing the town's cultural heritage and traditional interests.

In a 2018 interview, Abdur-Rasheed identified peace, cooperation, unity and education as priorities of his administration. He also discussed community development initiatives and the importance of cooperation between traditional institutions and government authorities.

His administration has also been associated with community-led infrastructure and educational initiatives. Speaking ahead of the 2025 Iragbiji Day celebration, Olabomi highlighted the construction of a civic centre, a judicial complex for the High Court and Magistrate Court, and a new palace. He attributed these projects to community participation and contributions from indigenes and development stakeholders.

He has also participated in activities promoting the town's cultural heritage and traditional institutions. In interviews, he has discussed the preservation of Yoruba traditional institutions, community unity and the role of traditional rulers in local development.

== University administration ==
In June 2024, the Federal Government of Nigeria appointed Olabomi as Pro-Chancellor and Chairman of the Governing Council of the Federal University of Agriculture, Abeokuta (FUNAAB). The appointment was announced by the university on 21 June 2024.

In this capacity, he became involved in the university's governing council activities. In February 2026, he delivered a special address at FUNAAB's 36th Ramadan Lecture, during which he called for support towards the completion of the university mosque.

== Honours and recognition ==
Abdur-Rasheed has received professional and institutional fellowships, including recognition from the Chartered Institute of Personnel Management and the Nigerian Institute of Management, according to a profile published by FUNAAB.

In October 2025, the Governor of Osun State, Ademola Adeleke, congratulated him on his 63rd birthday, recognising his leadership and contributions to the development of Iragbiji.

== See also ==
- Iragbiji
- Boripe
