= Jalumi War =

Civil war in Yorubaland

Coordinates: 7.92°N 4.66°E

Jalumi War (Ogun Jalumi)
- Part of Kiriji War
| Date | 1 November 1878 |
| Location | The towns of Inisa, Iba and Ikirun, in what is now Osun State, Nigeria |
| Result | Ibadan victory; Eastern forces form the Ekiti-Parapo union; Ijebu and Egba regions declare war on Ibadan |

Belligerents
| Eastern Yoruba: Ilorin; Ekiti; Ijesa; Ila | Western Yoruba: Ibadan; Ikirun |

Commanders and leaders
| Fabunmi of the Ekiti; Adeyale of Ila; Ogunmodede of Ijesha; Ayimoro of Ijesha; Ajia of Ilorin | Balogun Ajayi Ogboriefon of Ibadan; The Osi Ilori of Ibadan |
- Location within Nigeria

The Jalumi War, also called the Battle of Inisa, was a battle that took place on 1 November 1878 in the northeast of present-day Osun State, Nigeria. It was part of the larger conflict named the Ibadan War. The forces of Ibadan were victorious in detail over a force of rebellious Yorubas including soldiers from Ilorin, Ekiti, Ila and Ijesha. Despite the victory, fighting continued in the years that followed until the Ilorins were finally defeated in 1897.

== Background ==
The Jalumi War took place in the hilly country of the northeast of Osun State in the area that includes Inisa, Iba, Ikirun, Mesin Ipole (the present Imesi-ile), Okuku and Eko-Ende. It was one of the series of civil wars in Yorubaland between 1793 and 1893.

In June 1878, word came to Ibadan that the Ilorins had joined the Ekitis and Ilas in the alliance against them. The Ekitis and Ila, now joined by the Ijeshas, laid siege to Ikirun. The Emir of Ilorin sent his forces, led by Ajia, to join his allies around Ikirun. They suffered a setback at Otan but were reinforced and joined the siege. When news reached Ibadan they were unable to send help until their army returned on 14 October 1878 from an expedition to Meko. The Balogun Ogboriefon was told to march to the aid of Inisa and neighbouring towns within five days.

It was the peak of the rainy season, and many Ibadan soldiers drowned crossing the Otin River and Osun rivers. The Balogun had to share command with the Osi Ilori, a jealous and incompetent man. On 30 October 1878, the Ikiruns had been pressed back and fought within their town walls. The Balogun of Ibadan entered the town the next day with his relief force. The attacking forces at this time were in three groups. The Ilorins under Ajia were to the northeast, near the Ikirun farms. The Ilas under Prince Adeyale and the Ekitis under Fabunmi were camped together nearby. The Ijeshas were to the east, led by Ayimoro and Ogunmodede, encamped in the small town of Iba.

== Battle ==
On 1 November 1878, the three besieging forces advanced against Ikirun. The Balogun left the Osi Ilori and his followers with the Ikiruns to fight the Ilorins, Ekitis and Ilas, while he took his soldiers to fight the Ijeshas. The first group was defeated, their leader the Osi Ilori was taken alive, and the rest retreated to Ikirun. When the Balogun heard of the failure, he did not panic but through clever manoeuvres defeated and ruthlessly destroyed the Ijeshas. He then returned, defeated the Ilorins and drove them out of their camp, but not before they had killed the Osi. He then defeated the demoralized Ekitis and Ilas. The victory was complete.

The people of Ofa heard that the Ilorins were in retreat, and cut the bridge across the Otin River in their rear. The Ilorins were pushed into the flooded river by the victorious Ibadans, and thousands of men, women and horses drowned. Jalumi means "drown in the river". The battle is so named because of the drowning of the forces of Ilorin.

War charms were used by both sides in the Ibadan war, and some thought that the Muslim charms were more powerful than the traditional Yoruba ones. According to a verbal report given one hundred years later, an actor named Ojelade from Inisha who lived in Okuku impressed the Balogun of Ibadan with his magical powers. He and his troupe were asked to help the Ibadan forces against the rebels. It is said that Ojelade disguised himself as a white man, which made the enemy flee since "they could not fight the ghost of a white man." The members of the troupe could not be hurt. They stretched out their arms, and the bullets were caught in their clothes and fell to the ground, where they were collected and shot back at the enemy. Through these and other actions, the troupe helped with the victory. A war cannon monument marking the end of the war is located at the Odo Otin River bank, Inisa, Odo Otin LGA until today.

== Aftermath ==
Despite the Ibadan victory, the Ijebu refused to ally with them and the Egba would not give them passage to the coast. The Ekiti formed a military confederation called the Ekiti Parapo commanded by the Ogedengbe of Ilesha, and formed a tighter alliance with the Ijesha. The Ibadan found themselves fighting on three fronts. Okuku, which had been under the control of Ilorin, now came within the control of Ibadan, which posted a representative to the town. However, the region continued to be harried by the Ilorins. This continued after the British had negotiated peace in 1893, and ended only after the British Captain Bower destroyed the main Ilorin army near Otan using rockets in 1896. Ilorin itself fell the next year.
