= Ikirun College of Health Technology =

Private college in Osun State, Nigeria

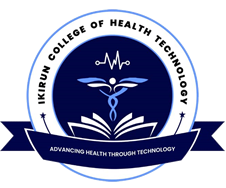
- Type: Private
- Established: 2024
- Founder: Mr. Abdullateef Oyewale
- Affiliations: National Board for Technical Education
- Rector: Oyewale Salaudeen Ajibola
- Location: Ikirun, Ikirun, Osun, Nigeria
- Language: English
- Website: https://ikirunhealthtech.edu.ng

Ikirun College of Health Technology is a privately owned and approved tertiary institution for establishment by Osun State Ministry of Education and is licensed by the National Board for Technical Education (NBTE) that is regulating the tertiary institutions in Nigeria. The institution was approved and commenced operations in May 2024.

== History ==
The College was founded in 2024 by Mr Abdullateef Opeyemi Oyewale. The college is located in Ikirun, Ifelodun local government area, Osun State, Nigeria. Aiming to train healthcare professionals for primary and secondary care. It offers health technology education, practical training, and certification within a supportive academic environment. The College has received formal licence of operation approval from the Federal Government of Nigeria.

== Department and courses ==
The college started with three hundred and five students across two faculties and 5 academic programmes. The programmes offered are; Community Health Technology, Health Assistant, Health Information Technology, Public Health Assistant, Public Health Technology.

== Admission ==
The Applicants of Ikirun College of Health Technology must have at least five (5) credit passes in core science subjects which includes: English Language, Mathematics, Biology, Chemistry, and Physics. In not more than two sittings from recognized examination bodies by the Federal Government of Nigeria such as West African Examinations Council (WAEC), National Examinations Council (NECO), General Certificate of Education (GCE), or National Business and Technical Examinations Board (NABTEB).

== Events ==
In May 2025, the college held its matriculation ceremony on campus, welcoming 305 pioneering students into its academic community. The event was attended by several dignitaries, including Professor Sunday Ajao Owolabi of Babcock University, Hon. Adetunji Abidemi Olusoji, honourable member of the 10th Assembly representing the Odo-Otin/Ifelodun/Boripe Federal Constituency.

== Administration ==
The principal members of the college are: Rector/Chief Academic Officer: OYEWALE, Salaudeen Ajibola Registrar/Secretary to the Academic Board: Mr. Abdullahi Adeniyi Deputy Registrar: Mr. Bello Idris Opeyemi Ag. Bursar: Mustapha Abiodun Rasaq Liberian: Mr. AYO Salami

== See also ==
- List of governors of Osun State
- Osun Health Insurance Scheme (O'HIS)
- Osun State Ministry of Education
- Osun State University
- Ikirun
