= Wale Oladipo =

Nigerian academic and politician (born 1958)

Professor Wale Oladipo
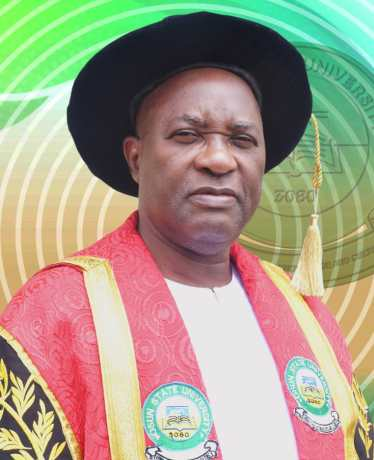
- The Pro-Chancellor and Chairman of the Governing Council of Osun State University, Abiodun Adewale Oladipo

Pro-Chancellor and Chairman of the Governing Council of Osun State University

Personal details
- Born: January 1, 1958 (age 68) ILE-IFE
- Citizenship: Nigeria
- Profession: Academic, administrator, and politician

Professor Abiodun Adewale Oladipo (born January 1, 1958, Ile-Ife, Nigeria) is a Nigerian academician, administrator, and politician. His Contribution includes, the field of nuclear chemistry, as well as his involvement in Nigerian politics. He serves as the Pro-chancellor and Chairman of the Governing Council of Osun State University.

== Early life and education ==
Oladipo attended St. John's Catholic Grammar School, Ile-Ife, from 1972 to 1976. During this period, he achieved a Grade 1 in the West African Senior Certificate Examination. He then pursued his bachelor's degree in Chemistry (Education) at Obafemi Awolowo University (formerly University of Ife), Ile-Ife, graduating with Second Class (Upper Division) honors in 1981. Following his undergraduate studies, he continued his education abroad at the Université Claude Bernard, Lyon I, Villeurbanne, France, where he obtained an MPhil and a PhD in Analytical Chemistry (Nuclear Techniques) With more than five publications in 1984-1988, under the active supervision of Professor JP Thomas.

== Academic career ==
In 2005, Oladipo achieved the rank of Research Professor at the Centre for Energy Research and Development (CERD) at Obafemi Awolowo University. He began his career as a Senior Research Fellow in CERD in 1993. He is also a member of Nigerian Association of Medical Physicists.

== Administrative career ==
Throughout his career, Oladipo has held various positions, including Head of Division, Environmental and Earth Sciences, CERD, OAU, and membership on the Academic Board, CERD, OAU.

== Achievements and awards ==
He has authorised many articles and also served as keynote speakers at several local and international conferences. His work on nuclear chemistry includes the use of Cryogenically Produced Heavy Cluster ions of Hydrogen in the Study of Plasma Desorption Mass Spectrometry, as well as the establishment of a fully Automated AAS Laboratory with Graphite Atomization and Cold Vapor Hg Detection Option.

== Career and activism ==
Professor Oladipo is active in various civic roles, including serving as a Nominee Director for Odu’a Investment Company Ltd in 1992, a Part-time Member of the Osun State Sports Council from 1998 to 1999, and a Part-time Member of the Osun State Local Govt. Service Commission from Feb. 2000 to 2002. He also served as a Member of the Ife Development Board for three years.

In 2008, he was appointed as the Chairman of the Osun State Universal Basic Education Board (SUBEB). Additionally, he served as the Chairman of the Governing Board of the Federal Neuropsychiatric Hospital, Yaba, from 2009 to 2011.

In July 2013, he was nominated as the National Secretary of the Peoples Democratic Party (PDP) and was subsequently elected for a substantive four-year tenure in December 2014 at the Party's Special National Convention held in Abuja.

== Publications ==
1. J.P. Thomas, A. Oladipo and M. Fallavier; 1988;B32: 354–359.
2. J.P. Thomas, A. Oladipo and M. Fallavier; 1988; "Secondary Ion Emission Induced in Insulators: Analytical Applications"605-611.
3. J.P. Thomas, A. Oladipo and M. Fallavier; 1989; "Collective Effects in the Desorption Process Induced by Hn+ Clusters near the Bohr's Velocity";
4. J.P. Thomas, A. Oladipo and M. Fallavier; 1989; "Surface Profiling of Insulating Layers using Desorption Induced by Monatomic or Cluster Ions of Beam Diameter in the 5–10 μm Range";
5. A. Oladipo, M. Fallavier and J.P. Thomas; 1991; "Secondary Ion Emission from Cesium Salts under Megaelectronvolt Ion Bombardment: Comparative Study and Beam Secondary Effects";.
6. B. Nsouli, P. Rumeau, H. Allali, B. Chabert, O. Debre, A. A. Oladipo, J. P. Soulier and J. P. Thomas; 1995; "Plasma Desorption Time-of-flight Mass Spectrometric Elucidation of the Mechanisms of Adhesion Enhancement between Plasma-treated PEEK-Carbon Composite and an Epoxyamine Adhesive";
7. H. Allali, O. Debre, B. Lagrange, B. Nsouli, A. A. Oladipo and J. P. Thomas; 1995; "Spontaneous Desorption : A Controlled Phenomenon for Surface Analysis Application? Part I : New evidence for a sputtering process induced by a well localized field enhanced desorption";
8. C. A Adesanmi, I. A. Tubosun, F. A. Balogun, and A. A. Oladipo; 1997; "Advantages of Combined IENAA and Ko-factor Technique in the Determination of U and Th Concentrations in Exploration Rock Samples";
9. H. Allali, M. Ben Embarek, O. Debre, B. Nsouli, A. Oladipo, A. Roche and J. P. Thomas: 1997; "An HSF-SIMS Investigation of the Prephosphatation Contribution to the Phosphatation Process of Silicon Steel Surface"; Rapid Comm. Mass Spectr. 11 1377–1382.
10. C. A. Adesanmi, F. A. Balogun, M. K. Fasasi, I. A. Tubosun, A. A. Oladipo; 2001; A semi- empirical formula for HPGe detector efficiency calibration;
