= Okuku, Osun State =

Okuku
- Location within Nigeria
- Coordinates: 8.018388°N 4.672341°E
- Country: Nigeria
- State: Osun State
- Local Government Area: Odo Otin
- Time zone: UTC+1 (WAT)

Okuku is a city in the Odo Otin Local Government Area of Ọṣun State, Nigeria.

Okuku is about 10 miles (16 km) north of Ikirun. It is the birthplace of Prince Olagunsoye Oyinlola (born 1951), who served as governor of Osun State in Nigeria from 2003 to 2010. Osun State University has a campus at Okuku, which is the location of the College of Management and Social Sciences. It is also the place of origin of the Late [Prince] Chief Justice T.A Irinoye of the defunct Gongola State [1927 - 1992]

== Origins ==
Okuku is populated by Yoruba people. Tradition says it was founded by Oladile, a direct descendant of Oduduwa. He and his brothers Alara, Ajero and Orangun left Ile-Ife at the same time. Oladile settled at a place near the Otin River called Iko-Ikin, meaning "clump of palm nuts". The name evolved into Kookin. Kookin was a large a prosperous town, a center for iron working. Around 1760 Kookin lost a battle with the Ijesha. The survivors moved a few kilometers north from the ruins of Kookin and founded the settlement of Okuku.

According to myth the goddess Otin, personified in the Otin River, protected Okuku from invasion by enemies, and the townspeople therefore worship her. Otin was from the town of Otan, but came to Okuku to fight against invasions by its neighbors.

== History ==
Okuku was subject to the Oyo Empire in the period before the fall of Old Oyo, and then to the Ilorin Emirate, which had a representative in the town. In 1878 Ibadan was victorious in a battle at Ikurin in the Jalumi War, and posted its representative to the town. The town is mentioned in a report of 1911 of a visit by the resident Captain Cyril Hammond Elgee and the Ibadan chiefs to hear a boundary dispute between Okuku and nearby Iba. The dispute was unresolved until the late 1930s. In 1935 Ivor Frederick Wentworth Schofield wrote a report on the town. He estimated that there were 1,606 inhabitants, and noted the "energetic and adventurous disposition" of the people. The town was accessible only by foot until the late 1930s, when the first road that could take a motor vehicle was built.

The farmland of Okuku was completely planted with cocoa and kola trees in the 1930s and 1940s. Yields began to fall in the late 1940s as the trees passed their most productive age and the soil became exhausted. Farmers were forced to buy or rent land distant from the town, often at considerable distances. They would live on their land from March to November, leaving the town to old people and young children. The months from December to February would be the time for social activity in the town, for weddings and funerals, and for celebrations including Christmas and New Years.
