= Ahmed Kusamotu =

Nigerian lawyer and politician

Chairman of the National Republican Convention
- In office 1993–1993

Personal details
- Born: 1940 Ikirun, Oyo State, Nigeria
- Died: 2005 (aged 64–65)
- Party: National Republican Convention
- Education: London School of Economics
- Occupation: Lawyer, politician

Ahmed Kusamotu (1940 - 2005) was a Nigerian lawyer who had a prominent political role as chairperson of the National Republican Convention during the late stages of the short-lived Third Republic.

Kusamotu is from one of the royal houses of Ikirun. A constitutional lawyer, he was involved in the Choice 92 presidential campaign of Umaru Shinkafi.

== Life ==
Kusamotu was born into the family of Adeoti Kusamotu and the Akirun of Ikirun, Kusamotu Oyewole, a Muslim traditional ruler whose family were influential to the growth of Islam in Ikirun. Kusamotu's forebears were among the leading lights in the cultivation of Islam among the people of Ikirun. His great-grandfather, Aliyu Oyewole is considered the first town monarch to adopt Islam, while his grand father, Akadiri Oyewole's tenure in the later part of the nineteenth century saw the diffusion of Islam in Ikirun.

Kusamotu who lost his father at a young age and raised by his mother, he attended St Paul's school, an Anglican run primary school and completed his secondary education at Osogbo Grammar School. Between 1965 and 1973, he earned LL.B, LL.M and PhD in law from London School of Economics. On his return to Nigeria, he briefly worked in the chambers of Richard Akinjide. In 1977, he established a law chamber in partnership with another lawyer Tunde Olojo, the firm later added a third partner, Umaru Shinkafi.

=== Politics ===
Kusamotu's entry into politics was during the nation's second republic; he was a member of the National Party of Nigeria and was an official member of the Oyo State executive committee of the party. He was also in the legal team that defended president Shehu Shagari in Awolowo v. Shagari & ors. After the republic was truncated, he continued with his practice. In 1988, he was a member of the Constituent Assembly to discuss the structure of a new constitution for an incoming Third republic. During the debate concerning the adoption of sharia, Kusamotu sided with the pro-Shariah proponents. However, he was not keen on the adoption of stringent criminal punishments based on Shariah. When politicking began, he joined the Shinkafi bloc within the newly formed Nigerian National Congress and was briefly vice-president of NNC before it merged with other groups to form the conservative National Republican Convention.

In the Third Republic, Kusamotu was affiliated with Choice 92, the presidential campaign organization of Umaru Shinkafi. In 1993, he was elected chairman of NRC but after the party's presidential candidate lost on June 12, 1993, Kusamotu and some members of NRC opted to support the proposal for an Interim National Council.

At the onset of the Fourth Republic, Kusamotu was a member of the All People's Party and was active in the alliance between APP and the Alliance for Democracy to produce a joint presidential ticket.
