= Timothy Olurotimi Tayo =

Nigerian agricultural scientist

Timothy Olurotimi Tayo is a Nigerian agricultural scientist and professor of agronomy at the Osun State University. In 2001, he was elected a Fellow of the African Academy of Sciences.

== Early life and education ==
Timothy Olurotimi Tayo was born in Nigeria. He began his higher education at the University of Ibadan, earning a Bachelor of Science (B.Sc.) degree in 1970.

Following his undergraduate studies, Tayo pursued advanced training at the University of Cambridge, United Kingdom, where he obtained his Doctor of Philosophy (Ph.D.) from Wolfson College in 1974.

After completing his Ph.D., he undertook two postdoctoral fellowships first at Iowa State University in the United States, and then at the University of Cambridge before returning to Nigeria to begin his academic career.

== Honours and recognitions ==
Timothy Olurotimi Tayo is a Nigerian agricultural scientist and professor of agronomy at the Osun State University. In 2001, he was elected a Fellow of the African Academy of Sciences. In 2023, he was named to the Presidential Postgraduate Scholarship Scheme Selection Committee as the representative for the Southwest geopolitical zone. In 2012, as a former student of Ilesa Grammar School, he earned a place on the school’s Roll of Honour under the name Timothy Rotimi Tayo. The Federal University of Agriculture, Abeokuta (FUNAAB) honored him by naming an agricultural laboratory in his recognition The Prof. Timothy O. Tayo Agricultural Laboratory.
