= Foluso Olugbenga Babatunji =

Anglican bishop in Nigeria

Foluso Olugbenga Babatunji is an Anglican bishop in Nigeria.

Babatunji was born on 27 May 1968 in Osun State. He was educated at Ijebu-jesa Grammar School, Immanuel College of Theology, Ibadan. He was ordained in 1991. He has served in four dioceses. Babatunji later became an Archdeacon. In 2019, he succeeded James Afolabi Popoola as Bishop of Osun.
