= Victoria Adunola Samson =

Nigerian businesswoman (born 1949)

- Born: December 5, 1949; Iree, Boripe, Osun State, Nigeria
- Occupation: Businesswoman
- Known for: Founder of BOVAS Group; Chancellor of Osun State University
- Title: Chancellor of Osun State University (2026–)
- Spouse: Bamidele O. Samson

Victoria Adunola Samson (born 5 December 1949), is a Nigerian businesswoman who founded the BOVAS Group, a petroleum marketing company, with her husband. In 1990 she won the Texaco Latin America and West Africa Award for Best Overall Dealer. In May 2026, the Osun State Government appointed her Chancellor of Osun State University, and she was installed on 6 July 2026.

== Early life and education ==
Samson was born on 5 December 1949 in Iree, Boripe Local Government Area, Osun State. She attended Ilesa Grammar School. She holds a Professional Diploma in Marketing and took part in a leadership programme for family businesses at Harvard Business School in 2013 and an executive programme at IESE Business School in Barcelona.

== Business career ==
Samson began in petroleum marketing in 1980 as a dealer for Texaco Nigeria. The Sun reported that she did so alongside her husband. In a 2024 interview she said the company name was formed from the initials of her husband and herself.

The Tribune reported that BOVAS opened its first service station in Osogbo in 1991 and that it ran 119 stations in 2022. The Osun State Government stated that the company had more than 200 stations and more than 2,000 employees as of December 2025. Vanguard reported that the company built a storage facility at Kirikiri, Lagos, with a capacity of 22,000 metric tonnes, acquired another at Ibafon, Apapa, with a capacity of 40,000 metric tonnes, and built a lubricant plant.

Tribune and Vanguard reported that BOVAS sold fuel at official prices during periods of scarcity. Samson has served as Matron of the Independent Petroleum Marketers Association of Nigeria at two depots and is a member of the board of trustees of the Depot and Petroleum Products Marketing Association.

== Chancellor of Osun State University ==
On 10 May 2026, Governor Ademola Adeleke appointed Samson Chancellor of Osun State University, after the tenure of Folorunso Alakija ended in March 2026. She was installed as the third Chancellor on 6 July 2026. The Sun reported that the appointment was for five years. The National Association of Nigerian Students issued a statement welcoming the appointment.

== Recognition ==
Vanguard reported that she received honorary doctorates from several Nigerian universities, including Ladoke Akintola University of Technology, Joseph Ayo Babalola University and Osun State University. In 2024 Vanguard Media gave her a Lifetime Achievement Award for 2023. In July 2026 the Women's School of Business and Leadership announced her as its 2026 Pan-African Woman of the Year.

== Philanthropy ==
Vanguard reported that the BOVAS Foundation has given materials worth at least ₦400 million, including COVID-19 relief and support for University College Hospital, Ibadan.

== Personal life ==
Samson is married to the architect Bamidele O. Samson, and they have children and grandchildren.
