= Ifelodun, Osun State =

Ifelodun
- LGA
- Interactive map of Ifelodun
- Location in Nigeria
- Coordinates: 7°55′N 4°40′E
- Country: Nigeria
- State: Osun State
- Headquarter: Ikirun

Government
  - Local Government Chairman: Hassan Kamoru Okanlawon

Area
  - Total: 114 km^{2} (44 sq mi)

Population (2006 census)
  - Total: 96,748
  - Density: 849/km^{2} (2,200/sq mi)
- Time zone: UTC+1 (WAT)
- 3-digit postal code prefix: 231
- ISO 3166 code: NG.OS.ID

Ifelodun is a Local Government Area in Osun State, Nigeria. Its headquarters are in the town of Ikirun. Hassan Kamoru Okanlawon is the current chairman of the council.

Ifelodun has an area of 114 km^{2} and a population of 96,748 at the 2006 census.

The LGA headquarters in Ikirun are about 10 minutes drive north of Osogbo, the state capital. There are twelve wards, mostly agrarian. Crops include kolanut, palm oil, root crops and fruit. Towns include Ikirun, Iba, Eko-Ende, Eko-Ajala, Obaagun, Dagbolu, Seke, Fidibomi and Oluode. Neighboring local governments are Olorunda, Odo Otin and Boripe. The postal code of the area is 231.

== Ifelodun North LCDA and Ifelodun North Area Council ==
Ifelodun North LCDA and Ifelodun North Area Council were created out of Ifelodun for administrative convenience, better development planning and to bring government closer to the grassroot. The LCDA is created by the Government of Osun State and is responsible for the funding of the council. The LCDA is headed by a chairman, vice chairman and other executive and legislative branches similar to the federally recognized local councils. Olaniyan Abdulrauf Adeniyi is the current chairman for Ifelodun North LCDA and Princess Jimoh Fausat is the chairman of Ifelodun North Area Council.
