= Labode Popoola =

Nigerian Academic (born 1960)

Vice chancellor of Osun State University
- In office 5 November 2016 – 4 November 2021
- Succeeded by: Clement Adebooye

Personal details
- Born: 28 September 1960 (age 64)

Labode Popoola (born 28 September 1960) is a Nigerian academic. He is a professor of forest economics and was the 3rd substantive Vice-Chancellor of the Osun State University.

== Early life ==
Poopola was born in Inisa, a local government area of Osun State. He obtained a Bachelor of Science, Honours in 1984 from the University of Ibadan. Following the completion of the compulsory one-year youth service program in 1985, he earned a master's degree in Forest Economics and Management (1987) and later received the doctor of philosophy in Forest Economics in 1990 all at the University of Ibadan.

== Career ==
Poopola began his academic career in January 1988 as a Graduate assistant at University of Ibadan. He rose to the rank of senior lecturer in 1997 and became a full professor of Forest Economics in 2002. He contributed to the development of the curriculum for the teaching of forest management in Nigerian universities.

He served as the Head of Department of Forest Resources Management from 2005 to 2006. He later became Dean, Postgraduate school, University of Ibadan (2006-2010). He became Director for the Centre for Sustainable Development for University of Ibadan (2010-2016).

Professor Labode worked as an external examiner for over seventeen years at institutions includingFederal College of Forestry in Ibadan, Federal college of Forest Merchanization in Kaduna, University of Uyo, Enugu State University, Federal University of Technology in Akure, Abeokuta, Markudi and in Yola, University College, Dublin, Ireland, UK.

== Associations ==
He belongs to many professional associations, including:

- Association of Research Managers, (UK)
- African Sustainable Development Network
- United Nation Sustainable Development Solutions Network
- International Society of Tropical Foresters
- Commonwealth Forestry Association
- African Network for Agroforestry Education
- Agroforestry Research Network for Africa
- Rural Development Forestry Network
- African Forest Research Network
- African Forest Forum
- West African Research
- Innovation Management Association
- Forestry Association of Nigeria (Life Member, Fellow, National Secretary).

== Publications ==
Poopola has written over 150 publications.

== Recognition ==
- Best all round student in academic, sports and character in Saint Patrick's College, Ibadan and Character
- Service Award Ibadan Diocese in 1978
- Postgraduate scholar at University of Ibadan (1988 -1990)
- Executive Member in African Network for Agroforestry Education (1999-2001)
- Award for Invaluable Service in Agroforestry from the International Centre for Research in Agroforestry (2001).
- National Contact Person, African Forest Research Network (2001-2010)
- Invaluable Service to the Forestry Profession from the Council of the Association of Nigeria (2002)
- National Chairman of Inisa Descendants’ Union, the umbrella union for Inisa indigenes (2004-2010).

== Personal life ==
Labode is a married man with kids.
