= Jimoh Oyetunji Laaroye =

Nigerian monarch

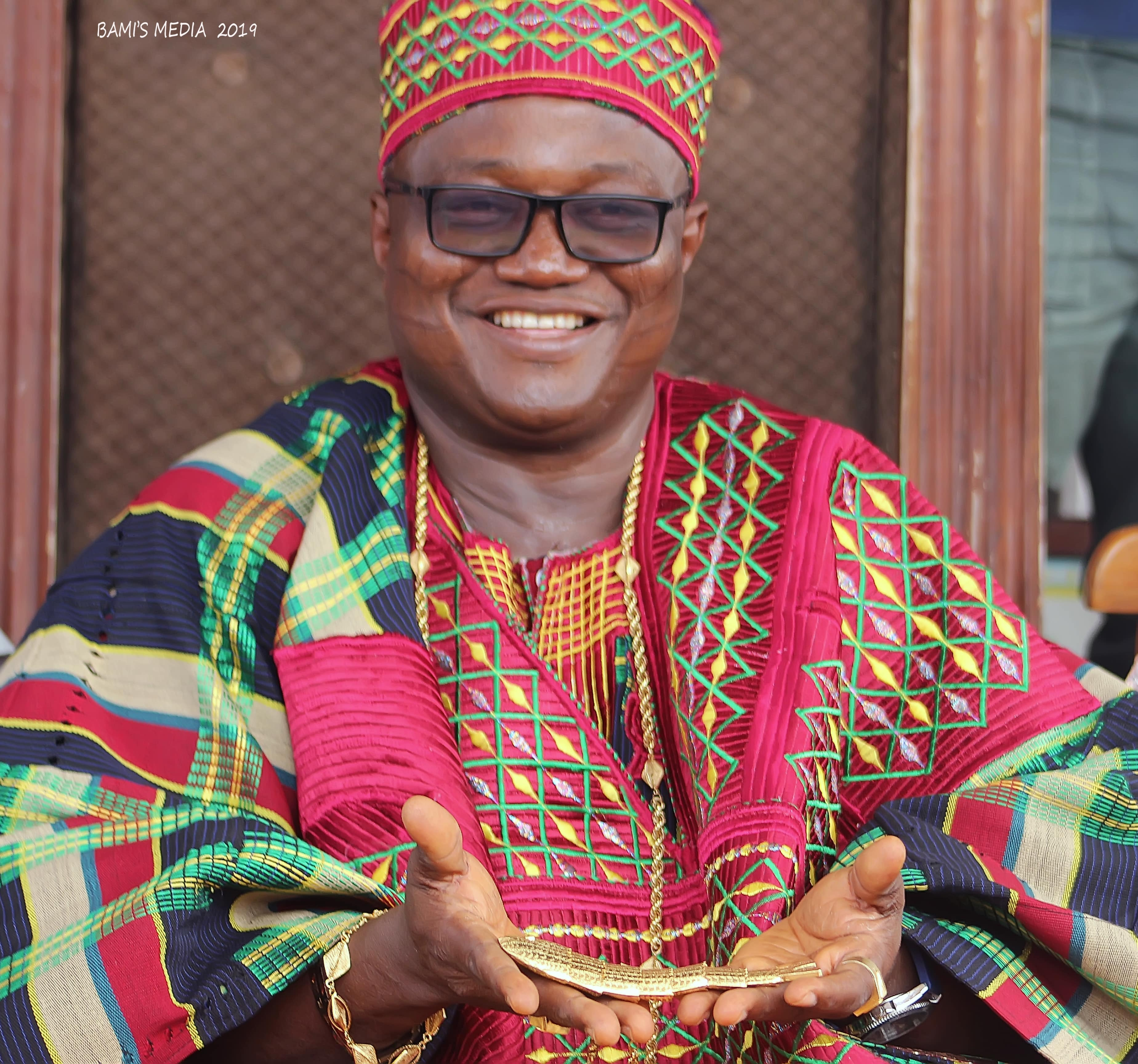

Ataoja of Osogbo
- Reign: 2010–present
- Predecessor: Iyiola Oyewale Matanmi III

Jimoh Oyetunji Laaroye is a Nigerian monarch. He is the 21st Ataoja of Osogbo and the current king and paramount ruler of the ancient city of Osogbo the state capital of Osun.
