= Iyiola Oyewale Matanmi =

Nigerian Monarch (1935–2010)

Iyiola Oyewale Matanmi III
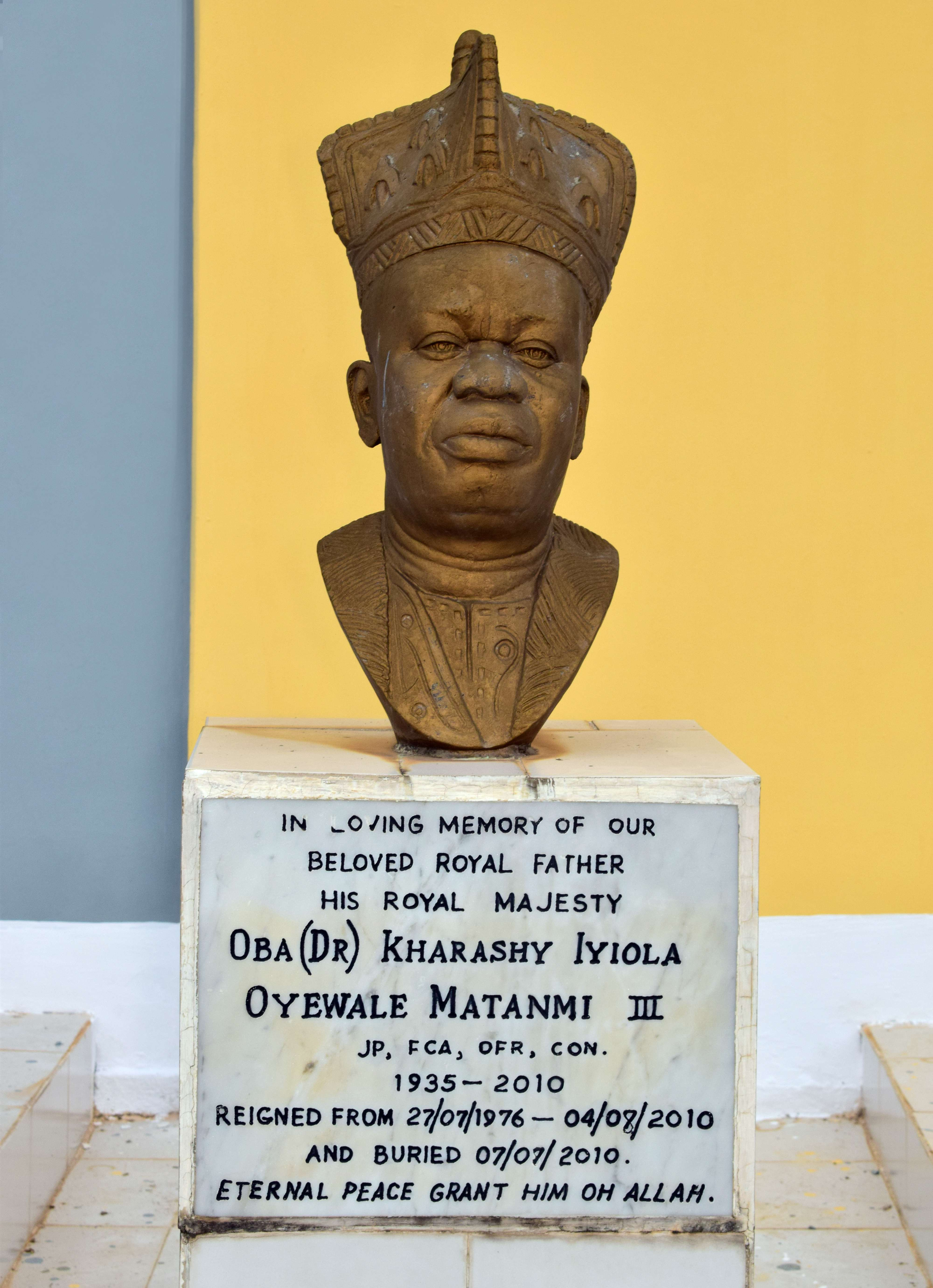

Ataoja of Osogbo
- Reign: 27 July 1976 – 4 July 2010
- Predecessor: Samuel Adeleye Adenle I
- Successor: Jimoh Oyetunji Laaroye II
- Born: 1935
- Died: 4 July 2010 (aged 74–75)
- Burial: Osogbo

Oba Iyiola Oyewale Matanmi III (1935 – 4 July 2010) was a Nigerian monarch. He was the 20th Ataoja (King) of Osogbo the ancient city of Osogbo the state capital of Osun.

== Early life ==
Matanmi was the king of Osogbo from 27 July 1976 to 4 July 2010 from the rulling house Lahanmi/Matanmi lineage and he reigned for 34 years before he died on 4 July 2010.
