= Samuel Adeleye Adenle =

Nigerian Monarch (1903–1976)

Samuel Adeleye Adenle I

Ataoja of Osogbo
- Reign: 1944–1976
- Predecessor: Samuel Oyedokun Latona II
- Successor: Iyiola Oyewale Matanmi III
- Born: 1903
- Died: 1976 (aged 72–73)
- Burial: Osogbo
- Spouse: Deborah Adedoyin

Samuel Adeleye Adenle I (1903–1976) was a Nigerian monarch. He was the 19th Ataoja (King) of Osogbo the ancient city of Osogbo the state capital of Osun.

== Early life ==
Oba Samuel was born January 1903 and was crowned as the 19th Ataoja of Osogbo on April 4, 1944, and reigned till he demised in 1976. He was married to Mrs Deborah Adedoyin and blessed with children
