= Osun State Polytechnic =

Polytechnic in Iree, Osun State, Nigeria

Osun State Polytechnic, Iree
- Type: Public
- Established: 1992
- Rector: Kehinde Alabi
- Location: Iree, Osun State, 231115, Nigeria
- Campus: Rural
- Website: ospoly.edu.ng

Osun State Polytechnic,Iree also known as OSPOLY, is a tertiary academic institution in Iree, Osun State, Nigeria. The polytechnic was formerly a satellite campus of the Polytechnic, Ibadan. It became autonomous on 12 October 1992 when the governor of Osun State, Alhaji Isiaka Adeleke, signed the law establishing the institution alongside Osun State College of Technology in Esa-Oke. Osun State Polytechnic, Iree, also has daily part time program (DPT) which is located at Koko campus.

The current Rector of Osun State Polytechnic, Iree is Mr Kehinde Alabi.

Recently, the National Association of Nigerian Students, NANS, commended the Rector of the institution, Kehinde Alabi for embracing dialogue to address the demand of the Students', while seeking improve students welfare.

During the 8th combined convocation of Osun State Polytechnic, Iree in 2026, the institution graduated 29,756 students.

== Faculties and departments ==
OSPOLY, Iree, has nine faculties and over 30 departments and units as of 25 March 2022. They are as follows:

=== Faculty of Information and Communication Technology ===
- Mass Communication
- Computer Science
- Office Technology Management (OTM)

=== Faculty of Management Studies ===
- Business Administration
- Marketing
- Procurement and Supply Chain Management

=== Faculty of Financial Studies ===
- Accountancy
- Banking and finance

=== Faculty of Science ===
- Science Laboratory Technology
- Statistics
- Applied Science (Chemistry Option)
- Applied Science (Microbiology Option)
- Food Science Technology

=== Faculty of Engineering ===
- Electrical and Electronics Engineering
- Computer Engineering
- Civil Engineering
- Mechanical Engineering
- Agricultural and Bio-Environmental Engineering
- Welding and Fabrication

=== Faculty of Environmental Studies ===
- Urban and Regional Planning
- Quantity Surveying
- Architecture
- Estate Management
- Building Technology

=== Faculty of Art and Industrial Design ===
- Art and Design
- Art and Industrial Design

=== Faculty of Vocational and Technical Education ===
- General Studies in Education
- Science Education
- General Education
- Business Education
- Technical Education

=== Directorate of General Studies ===
- Languages and Humanities
- Science and Social Sciences

== Management ==
- Rector: Mr. Kehinde Adeyemi Alabi
- Deputy Rector: NIL
- Registrar: Mr. Abiodun Oyedele Oloyede
- Bursar: Mr Ojebowale Olabamiji Elijah
- Polytechnic librarian:
- Director of works and services: Engr. Adetuberu O. Akingbade
- Board chairman: Diran Ayanbeku

== Partnership/collaboration ==
Osun State Polytechnic collaborated with the US to boost agricultural technology in the school.

== Alumni ==
- Hon Adegboye A. O
- Folaranmi Ajayi
- Enoch Oyedibu
- Bolaji Olaniyi
- Kehinde Ayantunji
- Temilade Odedele
