= Clement Adebooye =

Nigerian academic (born 1966)

Vice chancellor of Osun State University
- Incumbent
- Assumed office 4 January 2022
- Preceded by: Labode Popoola

Personal details
- Born: Odunayo Clement Adebooye; 18 December 1966 (age 59) Western Region, Nigeria (now Osun State, Nigeria)

Clement Adebooye (born 18 December 1966) is professor of plant physiology / food chemistry. He is the fourth substantive Vice-Chancellor of the Osun State University.

== Achievements ==
Adebooye has held a variety of positions, including deputy vice-chancellor, provost / dean, director and head of department at UNIOSUN. He was the most senior full-time professor at Obafemi Awolowo University in the Department of Crop Production and Protection prior to his appointment.

He had previously held positions as the regional project coordinator for the Government of Canada Projects in West Africa, Secretary-General of the African-German Network Excellence in Science (AGNES), and scientist ambassador for the German Government Alexander von Humboldt Foundation.

In 2026, Governor Ademola Adeleke approved a two-year extension of Adebooye's tenure as Vice-chancellor, which had been due to end in January 2027.

== See also ==
- List of vice chancellors in Nigeria
- University of Osun
