= Ondo =

Ondo may refer to:

== Places ==
- Ondo, Hiroshima, Japan, a former town
- Ondo State, Nigeria
  - Roman Catholic Diocese of Ondo, Ondo State
  - Ondo Town, a town in the state
- Ondo Kingdom (c. 1510–1899), a state with its capital in Ode Ondo (now Ondo Town)

== People ==
Ondo is a Fang masculine name. It is mainly found in Gabon and Equatorial Guinea. It is also spelled Ondó in the latter by following the Spanish language orthography rules. Notable people with the name Ondo or Ondó include:

- Purificación Angue Ondo (born 1945), Equatoguinean diplomat
- Gilles Mbang Ondo (born 1985), Gabonese footballer
- Loïc Mbang Ondo (born 1990), Gabonese footballer
- Juan Mbo Ondo (born 1991), Equatoguinean footballer
- Emilia Mikue Ondo (born 1984), Equatoguinean runner
- Francisco Obama Ondo (born 1996 as Franklin Bama Yangoua), Cameroonian footballer naturalized as Equatoguinean
- Daniel Ona Ondo (born 1945), Gabonese politician
- Bonifacio Ondó Edú (born 2003), Equatoguinean footballer
- Charles Ondo (born 2003), Equatoguinean footballer
- Estelle Ondo (born 1970), Gabonese politician
- Jean François Ondo (1916–after 1963), Gabonese foreign minister
- Jennifer Ondo (born 1992), Gabonese model
- María Rosa Ondo (born 1982), Equatoguinean football manager
- Mariano Ondo (1999–2022), Equatoguinean footballer
- Valéry Ondo (born 1967), Gabonese footballer
- Cédric Ondo Biyoghé (born 1994), Gabonese footballer
- Bruno Ondo Mengue (born 1992), Equatoguinean basketball player
- Emmanuel Ondo Methogo (born 1946), Gabonese politician
- Armengol Ondo Nguema (born 1970), Equatoguinean politician
- Salvador Ondo Nkumu, Equatoguinean politician and former judge, Minister of Justice since 2018 and from 2008 to 2011
- Albert Ondo Ossa, Gabonese politician
- Benjamin Zé Ondo (born 1987), Gabonese footballer

Note: Fang names are formed with the given name followed by the father's name – Fangs from Equatorial Guinea also include the mother's name in their full names due to the Spanish influence.

== Other uses ==
- Ondo (music), a type of Japanese folk music
- Ondo-class oiler, ships of the Imperial Japanese Navy
  - Japanese ship Ondo, lead ship of the class
- Ondō Bridge, connecting Kure City, Hiroshima, Japan, with the former town of Ondo
