= Osun Health Insurance Scheme =

State owned health insurance scheme

Osun Health Insurance Scheme (O'HIS) established by the Osun State government in Nigeria to improve the life of the people of the state at a more minimal rate, it was created to help the people have easy access to Health Care management/Insurance under the supervision of Osun State Ministry of Health.

Osun Health Insurance Scheme was designed to provide affordable, flexible and accessible health care serve to the people of Osun state especially the aged.

== Historical background ==
In 2017, Osun State government set up its health insurance scheme with a commitment to making the insurance scheme operational to serve its citizens. As mandated by state government law, the government also committed to provide a "take-off grant" to kickstart it and commence a statutory 1.5 percent reduction of actual payment from staff salaries and a 3 percent subsidy contribution by the state government.

The then governor of Osun state, Governor Rauf Aregbesola, saw the need of creating a health insurance scheme in the state and established it the following year, he then named the scheme the Osun health insurance sheme(O'HIS) and also appointed the former Chairman of the Nigeria Medical Association (NMA) Dr Niyi Oginni as the Executive Secretary of the scheme.

== Aims and objectives ==
Many people of Osun State especially the aged and some who are not financially capable of taking care of their medical bills, had little access to health care, and other to make it available to the masses, the osun state government moved for the creation of the Health insurance scheme. This was done by the former governor, Governor Rauf Aregbesola. According to Dr Oyinlola “The essence of the scheme is to assist the less privileged in the state to be able to access medical treatment without the fear and great financial burden of payment, so as to curtail the risk of catastrophic health expenditure among the Osun people"

During the celebration ceremony of the 30th Anniversary of the creation of Osun state, the Governor Adegboyega Oyetola, gave insight to the reasons behind the creation of the health insurance scheme, he said the scheme was created primarily to aid the aged and less privileged to access health care at minimal rate.

== Enrolment into the scheme ==
By the early weeks of may 2022, the Osun state government has said to enroll about 30,000 youths to the health insurance scheme. selecting them across all local government areas of the state, while speaking to the media in Osogbo the commissioner for sport and youth mr Olayemi Lawal talks about the benefits of the enrollment of the youth to the health insurance scheme. The Governor the state, Governor Adegboyega Oyetola presided over the inauguration ceremony of the youth, there he spoke about the importance of the inauguration and benefits to the local government from where the youths were selected.

== Endorsement and support ==
Addressing the media

House in Osogbo the state capital, the executive director of Osun Health Insurance Scheme (O’HIS) Dr Niyi oginni, disclosed the news that the flag off would be done by the presidenMuhammadu Buhari t and the health minister, Isaac Adewole, on 20 September 2018. The basic health provision fund which was signed into law under section 11 of 2014 Health Act, would be flagged off alongside Osun Health Insurance Scheme by the president, that will see the federal government fund the insurance scheme and treatment of malaria. High blood checks, diabetes among others will be done free for the people, delivery, anti natal, post natal and family planning would be free for pregnant women, while immunisation would be free for children. The health fund would be disbursed through the State Primary Health Care Development Agency and Social Health Insurance scheme, by which the primary health care development agency would be responsible for personnel, infrastructure and purchase of consumables and drugs of the health insurance scheme.

== See also ==
- Osun State Ministry of Health
