= Estelle Ondo =

Gabonese politician

Estelle Ondo (born 1970) is a Gabonese politician. Ondo was the Minister of Forest Economy, Fisheries and the Environment from October 2016 to 2018, nominated by Ali Bongo Ondimba.

Ondo is the former vice-president of the Union nationale, a Gabonese political party.

== Early life ==
Estelle Ondo was born on November 17, 1970, in Oyem, capital of the province of Woleu-Ntem.
