= Osun State Ministry of Education =

Ministry in Osun State, Nigeria

Ministry overview
- Jurisdiction: Government of Osun State
- Headquarters: State Government Secretariat
- Ministry executive: Hon. Oladoyin Olayinka Folorunso, Commissioner
- Website: https://www.osunstate.gov.ng/mdas/ministries-2/education-science-and-technology/

The Ministry of Education, Science & Technology Osun State oversees the development and implementation of educational policies and programs in Osun State, Nigeria. The Ministry is responsible for managing public education, formulating curricula, liaise with Federal Ministry of Education (Nigeria), regulating and supervision of privately owned schools and ensuring the quality of education across the state's Educational Institutions.

== See also ==
- List of governors of Osun State
- Ikirun College of Health Technology
- Osun State University
