= Cyril Hammond Elgee =

Colonial administrator (1871–1917)

- Born: Cyril Hammond Elgie; 18 October 1871; Otterbourne, Hampshire, England
- Died: 17 August 1917 (aged 45)
- Occupation: Colonial administrator.
- Known for: Atlantis theory

Cyril Hammond Elgee (18 October 1871 – 17 August 1917) was a British colonial administrator in Nigeria, based in Ibadan at the time when the basic colonial institutions were being established. During World War I (1914–18) he was Acting Commissioner of Montserrat for a period.

== Early years ==
Cyril Hammond Elgie (he later changed his surname to Elgee) was born on 18 October 1871, eldest son of the Reverend Walter Francis Elgie. His mother was Catherine, daughter of Colonel F. Hammond of the 75th Regiment and widow of Captain Webber of the 42nd regiment. She died on 25 February 1881. Cyril was admitted to Lancing College as a scholar in May 1885, and left in July 1889. He was admitted to the Royal Military College, Sandhurst in 1890.

== Career ==
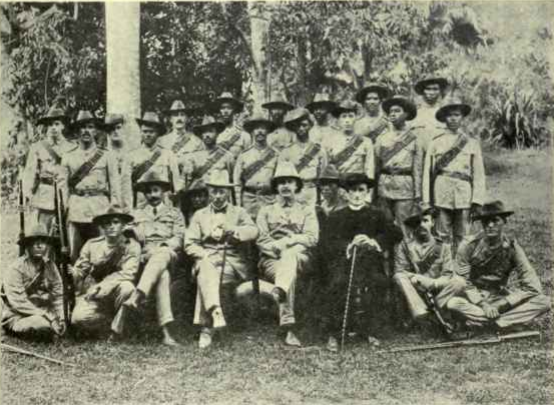
Defense Force, Montserrat, 1915. Seated in centre, left to right : Lieut. Dyett, Capt. Elgee (Acting Commissioner), Capt. Ruane, Canon Hayens

In 1892 Elgee became a second lieutenant in the Bedfordshire Regiment. He was made a lieutenant in 1893. In 1895 he served with the Chitral Relief Expedition. He was promoted to captain in 1899. On 28 October 1899 it was reported that Elgee had been seconded for service to the Colonial Office. Appointed 1 January 1903, and taking up his post in February 1903, he was the British Resident in Ibadan, Nigeria from February 1903 until 1913. He succeeded F.C. Fuller as resident in Ibadan. Elgee treated the leading people of Ibadan with courtesy and respect. However, he was not approachable by the ordinary people. In 1903 Elgee wrote of "the rapid strides of late made by the people in economical and political progress. There was growing demand for post office services and for plots of land. Six European firms were established by 1903, and twenty-five German, English, French and Brazilian firms had branches in Ibadan by 1906. Elgee wrote of the legal framework in 1904,

By this time, court cases were getting so numerous and so involved that it was felt necessary, if the chiefs were still to rule it with dignity to themselves and satisfaction to the Europeans and other aliens in their midst, that some alteration in judicial procedure must be made ... It was clear that an illiterate court of native chiefs was incompetent to deal with the technicalities incident to cases of fraudulent bookkeeping and the like, and it was also clear that it was neither possible nor advisable for a native court to sit in judgement over such cases where one of the parties was an alien, nor could they be held to be competent judges in such possible cases of the murder of a native by a European or vice versa.

Based on agreements with Yoruba authorities, the colonial authorities gained jurisdiction to try certain types of civil offence involving non-native people, and certain types of criminal offence whether they involved natives or foreigners. A modified form of English laws was introduced. Elgee established the Ibadan Native Government, opened the Treasury, Customs. Police and Secretariat, and engaged clerks. He resigned his army commission in 1904. In 1906 he founded the Baale's school to provide training to the sons on the local chiefs. The school was not a success since the chiefs would not send their sons there despite pressure from the British authorities. Shipping records show Captain C. H. Elgee returning to England from West Africa on 4 May 1907, 16 September 1910, 23 April 1912 and 14 December 1913. (Note: Shipping records also show that Cyril Hammond Elgee arrived in Liverpool on 19 September 1914 on a ship from Buenos Aires and Montevideo, and Cyril H Elgee arrived in Liverpool on 17 July 1915 from New York.)

Elgee was Acting-Commissioner, Montserrat in 1915. In 1916 there was correspondence about employment of Captain C. H. Elgee by the government in Montserrat. Elgee died on 17 August 1917, aged 45. St Mathew's Church, Otterbourne has a brass wall plaque in his memory and that of his brother Hugh Francis Elgee, who was killed in action at Gallipoli in 1915. Their father had been vicar of the parish.

== Publications ==
Elgee's publications included:

- Ensigns of Royalty in West Africa .Journal of the Royal African Society. Volume 4, 16 July 1905. pp. 391–396.
- Western Equatorial Africa, Diocesan Magazine, 16, 193, July 1910. Western Nigerian Ministry of Local Government.
- The Evolution of Ibadan, 1914. University of Oxford: Weston Library; MSS.Afr.s.1169. 59 pages of typescript.

In 1908 he proposed the theory that Nigeria could be the location of Atlantis. Several years later Leo Frobenius proposed a similar theory.
