= James Afolabi Popoola =

Anglican bishop in Nigeria

James Afolabi Popoola was an Anglican bishop in Nigeria: from 2000 to 2019 he was Bishop of Osun

Popoola was born on 20 November 1949 in Ogun State. He was educated at Methodist Secondary Modern School, Abeokuta and the University of Ibadan. He was ordained Deacon in 1975 and priest in 1976. He has served in Ilewo Igbele; Olokuta; Ajilete; and St. James’ Cathedral, Oke Bola, Ibadan.

He retired as Bishop of Osun in 2019.
