= Iragbiji =

Town in Osun State, Nigeria

Iragbiji Ìràgbìjí
- Location within Nigeria
- Coordinates: 7°54′00″N 4°41′00″E
- Country: Nigeria
- State: Osun State
- Local Government Area: Boripe

Government
  - Traditional ruler: Abdur-Rasheed Olabomi
  - Royal title: Aragbiji of Iragbiji
- Elevation: 429 m (1,407 ft)

Population (2006)
  - Total: 164,172
- Time zone: UTC+01:00

Iragbiji (also Ira-gba-iji) is a town and headquarter of the Boripe Local Government Area, Osun State, Nigeria. The town shares border with Ikirun, Osogbo and Ada. The town is inhabited by the Yoruba people. The population of the town is about 164,172.

== History and oral tradition ==
The name "Iragbiji" came into use over 600 years ago, it was reported that the first settlers made their homes under an IRA tree (Bradilier Thongy). The town was founded by a great hunter from Ejio compound in Moore, Ile Ife called Sunkungbade (Obebe). The man Sunkungbade got his name from a drama he created while he was still an infant. He was said to be in the habit of crying ceaselessly and not even the milk of his mother's breasts could soothe him. As it was the practice in those days, an ifa (oracle) was consulted to determine why he cried so much. The ifa advised his parents to make a miniature crown and place it on his head whenever he cried. The oracle's advice worked, and so Sunkungbade (he who cried to get a crown) was added to his names. The Ifa priest, Oladunjoye, foretold that when Sunkungbade became an adult, he would ask to found his own community and that he should be allowed to do so. As the child matured, he started exhibiting all the traits the priest had foretold. He was courageous, intelligent, strong-willed and especially attached to tradition and culture. He married a woman named Oloyade. He asked his parents to be allow him to leave and found his own settlement. Remembering the oracle's advice, his parents gave their blessing.

== Traditional institutions ==
The traditional institution of Iragbiji is headed by the Aragbiji of Iragbiji, the town's traditional ruler. The succession to the throne is associated with four recognised ruling houses: Ajibode, Ogunmolu, Osungbemi and Arodoye, also spelt Arowodoye in some historical accounts.

According to accounts of the town's oral history, the four ruling houses trace their ancestry to a royal family in Ejio, Ile-Ife. Their ancestral history is associated with Sunkungbade, a hunter who left Ile-Ife and settled in the area that later developed into Iragbiji, approximately six centuries ago. Representatives of the ruling houses have described their reunion with their ancestral family in Ile-Ife as an affirmation of their historical connections.

The present monarch, Oba Abdul Rasheed Ayotunde Olabomi, Odundun IV, is the 15th Aragbiji of Iragbiji. He ascended the throne in 2008 and has served as the traditional ruler since then.

The composition of the recognised ruling houses became the subject of a chieftaincy dispute following the Osun State Government's decision in January 2025 to recognise the Lagbua family as a fifth ruling house, based on the recommendation of a 2010 judicial panel of inquiry. Representatives of the four existing ruling houses challenged the decision. On 21 August 2026, the Osun State High Court sitting in Iragbiji set aside the government's decision, the accompanying White Paper and the consequential amendment to the Aragbiji Chieftaincy Declaration. The judgment restored the previous position recognising Ajibode, Ogunmolu, Osungbemi and Arodoye as the four ruling houses.

== Tourist attractions ==
Iragbiji has several natural, historical and cultural heritage sites, including rocky hills, caves, streams, traditional shrines and museums. Some of these landmarks are associated with the town's founding traditions, ancestral history and religious practices. The hilly landscape of Iragbiji has also been identified as an important feature of its cultural identity and natural environment.

=== Natural and historical sites ===
One of the prominent natural landmarks in Iragbiji is Okanyilule Hills, also known as the Double Hills. The rocky formations are an important symbol of the town and feature in its traditional praise poetry. According to the oral account narrated by the Aragbiji, the site is associated with a historical land dispute between Iragbiji and neighbouring Obaagun, during which one of the two rocks reportedly rolled down from the other. The surviving formation subsequently became a symbol of Iragbiji's identity and heritage. The surrounding area also contains historical settlement remains and water sources, including Oloti.

Oke Iragbiji, also known as Ori Oke, is another significant landmark associated with the traditional history of the town. According to local oral tradition, its hill and cave formations are connected with the hunting expedition of Sunkungbade, the traditional founder of Iragbiji. The site is also associated with the annual Oke Iragbiji or Ori-Oke Festival, which brings together the monarch, traditional chiefs and indigenes of the town. The nearby Ayeye Stream is another feature of the site and has historical and spiritual significance in local tradition.

Other natural and historical locations identified in the community's historical documentation include Alagaso water source and cave, Oke Moori, Okuta Odo (Motar) Hill, Isikan Hill, Ota Igun Hill, Gbanla/Oso Osi site, Isanpa and the Ira Tree site.

=== Museums and cultural heritage sites ===
Iragbiji has two documented museums: Ile-Ona Museum of Arts and Archival Materials, a private museum associated with Chief Muraina Oyelami, the Eesa of Iragbiji, and the Palace Museum, located within the traditional royal institution. These collections preserve aspects of the town's artistic, historical and cultural heritage.

Other cultural and religious heritage locations recorded in the town include Igbodu place and its cave, Osun Shrine, Obatala Shrine, Igbo Igbale, Ojolukoko Shrine, Oba Ogunmolu Shrine, Sanpona Shrine at Oke Agbo and the traditional war and stone-wall fences. The historic Ile Nla, an older palace building, is also identified among the town's heritage locations.

The Osun State Government's tourism and monuments inventory also identifies the Oke-Iragbiji Shrine and Caves as a tourist attraction in Iragbiji.

== Climate ==
The climate of Iragbiji is that of a tropical savanna. Throughout the year, temperatures can go as high as 39 °C (102 °F), with a usual range of 24 °C (75 °F) to 28 °C (82 °F). There are 190 wet days per year with an average of 1482 mm (58.4 inches) of precipitation. There are 11 or 12 hours of daylight.the rainy season ranges from March to September,while the dry season is from the month of October towards the ending of february of the year.

== Educational institutions ==
Iragbiji is experiencing growth in size with number of educational institutions as evident below;

=== Public primary schools ===
- N. U. D School 1, Isale Oyo, Iragbiji
- N. U. D. School 2, Isale Oyo, Iragbiji
- St. Peters Anglican Primary School, Oloti Area, Iragbiji
- Baptist Primary School, Isale Oyo, Iragbiji
- C & S Primary School, Ajegunle Area, Iragbiji
- Oba Rasheed Ayotunde Olabomi Model Primary School, Orita Odan, Iragbiji
- C. A. C. Primary School, Idi-Isakaagba, Iragbiji
- L. A. Primary School, Popo, Iragbiji
- L. A. Primary School Eesade, Iragbiji
- Methodist Primary School, Otapete Area, Iragbiji
- Ajani Okin Memorial Primary School, Adugbo, Iragbiji
- C. A. C. Primary School, Idi-Ogungun
- Community Primary School, Oore
- Community Primary School, Odebudo
- Aderibigbe Memorial Primary School, Eleesun
- Agbeniga Community Primary School, Aro Ayedaade
- D. C. Primary School, Egbeda
- Community Primary School, Ayekale

== Private institution ==
- Pathfinder College of Health, Iragbiji

== Federal institution ==
- Federal University of Agriculture, Iragbiji

=== Public secondary schools ===
- Oke Iragbiji Grammar School, Iragbiji
- Baptist Secondary Grammar School, Iragbiji
- Unity School, Iragbiji
- Nawar-ud-Deen Grammar School, Isale Oyo, Iragbiji

=== Private primary schools ===
- FOMWAN Nursery School, Adugbo, Iragbiji
- God Supremacy Nursery & Primary School, Iragbiji
- Our Lady of Fatimah Nursery & Primary School, Adikoko, Iragbiji
- Pace Setter Nursery & Primary School, Egbeda Road, Iragbiji
- Onward Nursery & Primary School, Iragbiji
- Gods Heritage Nursery & Primary School, Iragbiji
- Prince of Peace Nursery & Primary School, Iragbiji
- Ibad Rahaman Nursery & Primary School, Iragbiji
- Dunit Nursery & Primary School, Iragbiji
- Markaz Nursery & Primary School, Iragbiji
- A2 Group of Schools, Isale Oyo, Iragbiji
- High Class Group of Schools, Lado Area, Iragbiji

=== Private secondary schools ===
- FOMWAN High School, Iragbiji
- God supremacy High School, Iragbiji
- Victory Scientific High School, Iragbiji
- A2 Comprehensive High School, Iragbiji
- Muslim Comprehensive High School, Iragbiji
- Pace Setter Group of Schools, Iragbiji

=== Tertiary institutions ===
- Pathfinder College of Health Technology, Isanpa, Iragbiji.
- Proposed Bisola University, Egbeda Road, Iragbiji
- Osun State College of Education Ilesa Sandwich Centre, Oke-Iragbiji Grammar School, Iragbiji

Federal University of Agriculture and Developmental Studies, FUADSI, Ìrágbìjí

== Health institutions ==
- Comprehensive Health Centre, Iragbiji
- Four Primary Health Centres (Public)
- Ten Private Hospitals/Medical Centres, Iragbiji
- National Primary Health Centre, Iragbiji (Inoperational)

As of 2006, about 75% of children in five different schools in Iragbiji were found to have intestinal helminth parasites (a type of parasitic worm).

== Gallery ==
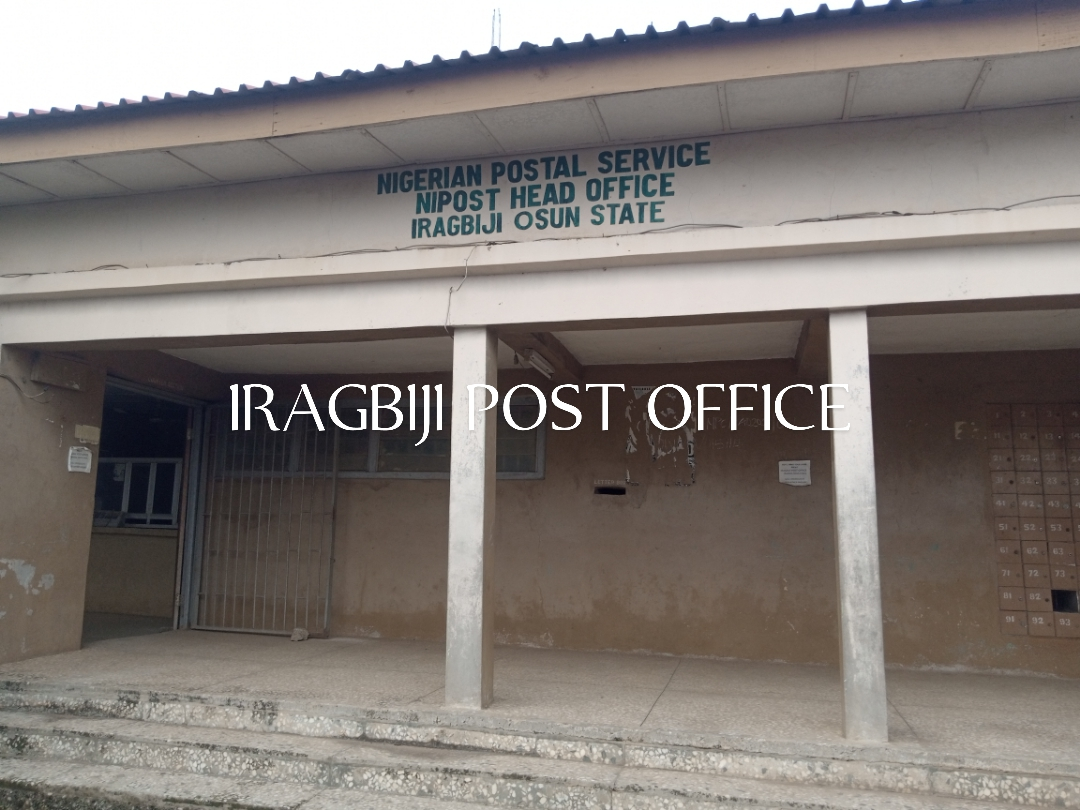
Iragbiji Post Office

Short story of Iragbiji by a native speaker
