= Inisa =

- Town
- Interactive map of Inisa
- Coordinates: 7°59′N 4°39′E
- Country: Nigeria
- State: Osun
- LGA: Odo Otin

Government
  - Type: Civilian government

Population
  - Total: 180,533
- Postal code: 231101

Inisa is a city in Odo-Otin local government area of Osun State in the south-western Nigeria. It is in the Yoruba cultural and ethnic region of the country, and is a trading center for cocoa and other agricultural products grown in the surrounding area. Its population as of 2007 was 180,553.

== History ==
Inisa had been from time immemorial, a warrior community. It was deeply involved in the struggle for the survival of Yoruba race during the period of internecine wars and particularly, during the onslaught and incursions of the Fulani into Yorubaland in the 19th century. Inisa people participated actively in the series of the wars. They fought in the Osogbo war of 1840, the Jalumi War of 1878, the Ofa war (1886–1890) and the Daparu war. The Ofa war resulted from the desire of Ilorin-Fulani to avenge their defeat at the Jalumi on Ofa and the neighboring towns. The war was fought during the reign of Oba Oloyede Ojo, Otepola I. They laid siege on Ofa for several years before Ofa was eventually sacked around 1890. The Daparu war resulted from the sack and fall of Ofa. The Fulani now desired to sack all the towns and villages between Ofa and Osogbo and bring them under the rule of the Fulani of Ilorin. They continued to attack, raid, and wage wars against the people. Only Inisa faced the Fulani forces, as the other towns and villages were deserted, seeking refuge at the Ibadan war camp in Ikirun.

== Rulers ==
The name of the Paramount ruler of the town since 1978 is Oba Joseph Oladunjoye Oyedele, Fasikun II, JP.

== Hospital/Health centers ==
There are health center and some clinics in inisa

- Inisa Primary Health center
- Labab Hospital inisa

== Notable people ==
- Debo Adeyewa – Vice Chancellor, Redeemer University of Nigeria (RUN), Ede, Osun State.
- Prof. Labode Popoola – Professor of Forest Economics/Sustainable Development, University of Ibadan. VC Osun State University, Osogbo.
