= Odo Otin =

- LGA
- Interactive map of Odo Otin
- Location in Nigeria
- Coordinates: 8°01′N 4°42′E
- Country: Nigeria
- State: Osun State
- Headquarter: Okuku

Government
  - Local Government Chairman and the Head of the Local Government Council: Adepoju Johnson Oladele

Area
  - Total: 294 km^{2} (114 sq mi)

Population (2006 census)
  - Total: 134,110
  - Density: 456/km^{2} (1,180/sq mi)
- Time zone: UTC+1 (WAT)
- 3-digit postal code prefix: 231
- ISO 3166 code: NG.OS.OO

Odo Otin is a local government area in Osun State, Nigeria. Its headquarters are in the town of Okuku. The current chairman of the council is Adepoju Johnson Oladele.

It has an area of 294 km^{2} and a population of 134,110 as of the 2006 Nigerian census.

The LGA takes its name from the Otin River, which traverses it.

== Odo-Otin North and Odo-Otin South LCDAs ==
Odo-Otin North Local Council Development Area and Odo-Otin South Local Council Development Area (LCDAs) were created out of Odo Otin area council for administrative convenience, better development planning and to bring government closer to the grassroot. The LCDA is created by the Government of Osun State and is responsible for the funding of the council. The LCDA is headed by a chairman, vice chairman and other executive and legislative branches similar to the federally recognized local councils. The current chairmen for the LCDAs are Adekeye Adebayo Iyiola (Odo-Otin North) and Prince Akinloye Aliyu Oluwole (Odo-Otin South).
