= Ikirun =

Town in Osun State, Nigeria

- Town
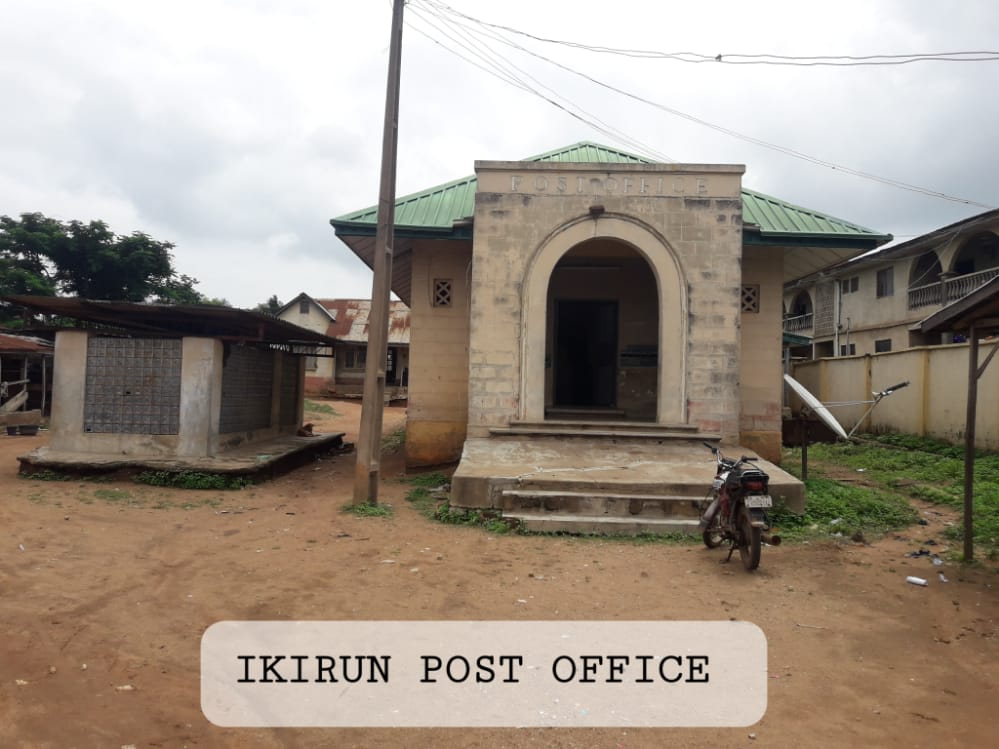
- Interactive map of Ikirun
- Country: Nigeria
- State: Osun
- LGA: Ifelodun

Ikirun is a town in Osun State, Nigeria. It is the headquarters of the Ifelodun Local Government Area.

== Geography ==
Ikirun bordered to the north by Inisa, to the south by Osogbo, to the east by Iragbiji, and to the west by the town Eko-Ende. The town is located in a valley surrounded by two hills: Obagun to the north and Aafo to the south. The Alaroka and Idi-olo mountains are to the east.

== History ==
The town was founded by Akinorun, from whom the name Ikirun derives. Akinorun had two sons, Akinbiyi and Akinyemi, who also ruled the town when it was formed.

== Climate ==
In Ikirun, the wet season brings warm, oppressive, and overcast conditions, while the dry season is characterized by hot, muggy weather with occasional cloud cover. Throughout the year, the temperature typically ranges from 64 °F to 91 °F, seldom dropping below 58 °F or rising above 97 °F.

The period of high temperatures in Ikirun spans approximately 2.1 months, occurring from January 23 to March 28. During this time, the daily high temperatures consistently exceed 89 °F. March stands out as the hottest month in Ikirun, with an average high of 90 °F and a low of 72 °F.

Conversely, the cooler season in Ikirun lasts for around 3.8 months, extending from June 16 to October 10. Throughout this period, the daily high temperatures remain below 83 °F on average. August is recognized as the coldest month of the year in Ikirun, with an average low temperature of 69 °F and a high of 81 °F.

== Schools ==
Among the schools located the town is Federal Government College Ikirun, a Federal Government owned secondary school. Others include Akinorun Grammar, a senior secondary school located in the town, African Church Grammar school, Idi Iragbiji Road Ikirun, Coker Memorial Grammar School, Old Inisha Road, Ikirun, African Church Grammar School, Idi Olo area, Old Iragbiji Road, Ikirun; Federal Government College, Odo Amo, P.O. Box 5203, Ikirun,amongst a few others.

== Festivals ==
The Egugun and Ikirun festivals are famous festivals in Ikirun. The Egugun Festival is a festival of masquerade displays that occurs in the month of May annually in Ikirun and spans seven days. The Ikirun festival is a day used to reflect on the progress of the people, bring together indigenous people who have sojourned far and also contribute towards the development of the people.

The first Ikirun day was held on the 18th of April 1992.

== See also ==
- List of governors of Osun State
- Osun Health Insurance Scheme (O'HIS)
- Ikirun College of Health Technology
- ACKNOWLEDGEMENT AND REFERENCES IKIRUN A TOWN IN OSUN STATE, NIGERIA By Taye Olasunkanmi Bello, Adeolu Printing Press, Adenuga Gbongan. Osun State, Nigeria. 1st edition, 1997. Printed in Nigeria.
