= Osun State University =

Public university in Osun, Nigeria

- Other name: UNIOSUN
- Motto: Living Spring of Knowledge and Culture
- Type: Public
- Established: 21 December 2006
- Chancellor: Victoria Adunola Samson
- Vice-Chancellor: Clement Adebooye
- Location: Osogbo, Osun State, Nigeria; 7°45′42″N 4°36′04″E
- Campus: Urban
- Website: www.uniosun.edu.ng

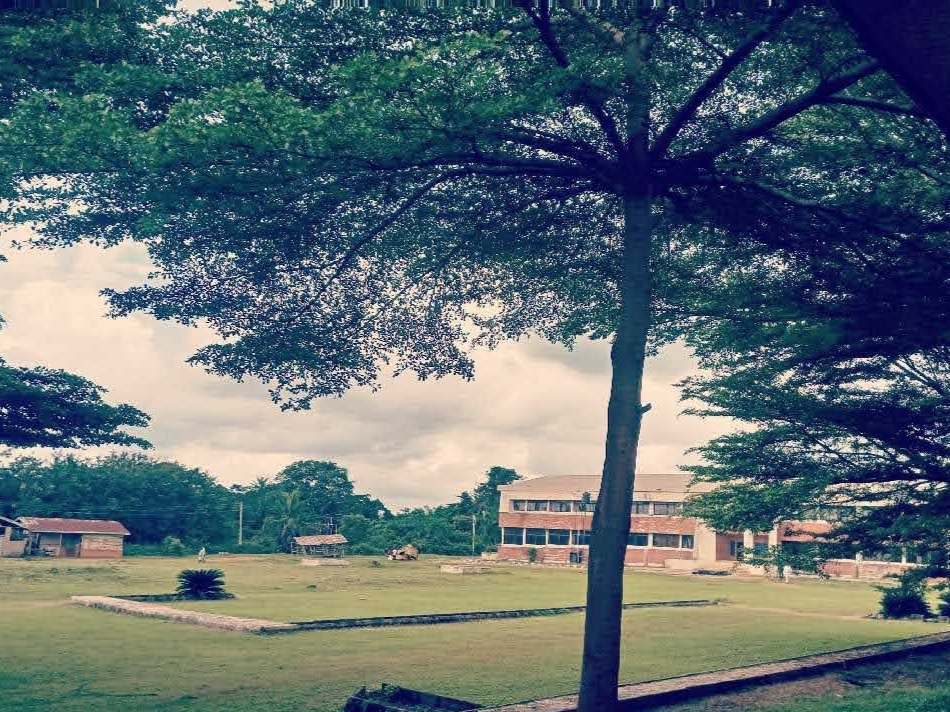
Administrative building and lecture theater - Ejigbo campus

Osun State University (UNIOSUN) is a multi-campus university in Nigeria, established by Osun State Government under the administration of Prince Olagunsoye Oyinlola. The University currently operates six campuses distributed across the six administrative zones of the state.

Nigeria's National Universities Commission approved Osun State University on 21 December 2006, as the 30th State University and the 80th in the Nigerian university system. It has its campuses in Osogbo, Ikire, Okuku, Ifetedo, Ipetu Ijesha and Ejigbo, which serves as campuses for Health science, Humanities and Culture, Social science and Management, Law, Education and Agriculture respectively.

Osun State University had its first convocation ceremony in 2011, under the administration of Ogbeni Rauf Aregbesola. The University had a reputation of not being involved in the nationwide ASUU strike, until the 2013 ASUU strike which lasted for over five months. The University has maintained a relatively stable academic calendar since its establishment in 2007, a feature that distinguishes it among many public universities in Nigeria, where academic activities are often affected by industrial actions and other disruptions. The university has consistently published and implemented structured academic calendars for both undergraduate and postgraduate programmes, enabling students to complete their studies within the stipulated duration. This consistency has been cited by the institution as a contributing factor to its academic growth and expanding postgraduate programmes. The university’s postgraduate college describes Osun State University as one of the fast-growing universities in Nigeria, attributing this to its commitment to uninterrupted academic activities, research development, and institutional expansion.

== Colleges & Faculties/Departments ==
S/N	COLLEGES	FACULTIES	DEPARTMENTS
1	College of Agriculture	Route to the administrative building	Department of Animal Science; Department of Agricultural Economics and Extension; Department of Agronomy; Department of Fisheries and Wildlife Management
2	College of Education		Department of Arts and Social Science Education; Department of Science, Technology and Mathematics Education; Browse the entire College
3	College of Health	Faculty of Clinical Sciences	Department of Community Medicine; Department of Medicine; Department of Obstetrics and Gynaecology; Department of Paediatrics; Department of Ophthalmology; Department of Psychiatry; Department of Surgery; Department of Nursing Science
4	-	Faculty of Basic Clinical Sciences	Department of Chemical Pathology; Department of Haematology; Department of Morbid Anatomy and Histopathology; Department of Pharmacology; Department of Medical Microbiology and Parasitology
5	-	Faculty of Basic Medical Sciences	Department of Anatomy; Department of Physiology; Department of Biochemistry
6	College of Humanities and Culture		Department of History and International Studies; Department of Languages and Linguistics
7	College of Law	Faculty of Law	Department of Law
8	College of Management and Social Sciences		Department of Accounting, Banking and Finance; Department of Business Administration; Department of Economics; Department of Geography; Department of Human Resource Development; Department of Political Science; Department of Sociology and Criminology
9	College of Science, Engineering and Technology		Department of Biological Sciences; Department of Civil Engineering; Department of Electrical/Electronics Engineering; Department of Mechanical Engineering; Department of Geological Sciences; Department of Chemical Sciences; Department of Information & Communication Technology; Department of Mathematical & Physical Sciences; Department of Urban and Regional Planning

== Chancellor ==
The Chancellor of Osun State University is the ceremonial head of the institution. The office is established under the Osun State University (Establishment) Law, 2006, which provides that the Chancellor shall take precedence over all other members of the University and preside over Convocation ceremonies for the conferment of degrees and other academic awards when present.

In the governance structure of the University, the Chancellor is a non-executive dignitary who represents the symbolic authority and continuity of the institution. The office is distinct from that of the Vice-Chancellor, who serves as the chief executive and academic head responsible for the day-to-day administration of the University.

The Chancellor is appointed by the Visitor to the University (the Governor of Osun State) and holds office for a term of five (5) years in the first instance, which may be renewed at the discretion of the Visitor. The officeholder may also be involved in the conferment of honorary degrees, subject to confirmation procedures provided in the governing statute.

The role is largely ceremonial but remains central to the University's formal academic traditions, particularly Convocation ceremonies, where the Chancellor represents the highest dignitary presence of the institution.

== List of Chancellors of Osun State University ==
Chancellors of Osun State University
No.	Name	Tenure	Notes
1	His Imperial Majesty Oba Okunade Sijuwade, Olubuse II	2007–2014	Pioneer Chancellor of Osun State University, who presided over Convocation ceremonies during his tenure.
2	Apostle Dr. Mrs. Folorunso Alakija	2016–2026	Appointed in 2016 and reappointed in 2021 for a second five-year term; served a total of ten years.
3	Mrs. Victoria Adunola Samson (Mama BOVAS)	2026–present	Appointed by the Visitor to the University following the expiration of the previous Chancellor’s tenure in 2026.

== Vice-Chancellors ==
The Vice-Chancellor of Osun State University is the chief executive and academic officer of the institution. The office is responsible for the daily administration of the University, including academic planning, staff and student affairs, financial management, and implementation of policies approved by the Governing Council.

The Vice-Chancellor is appointed by the Governing Council of the University and serves a single term of five (5) years in accordance with the provisions of the Osun State University (Establishment) Law. The officeholder also serves as Chairman of the Senate and is responsible for academic leadership and institutional development.

Since its establishment in 2006, Osun State University has had several Vice-Chancellors who have overseen its development across its multi-campus structure.

== List of Vice-Chancellors of Osun State University ==
Vice-Chancellors of Osun State University
No.	Name	Tenure	Notes
1	Professor Sola Akinrinade	2007–2010	Pioneer Vice-Chancellor who oversaw the commencement of academic activities at Osun State University.
2	Professor Bashiru Aremu	2010–2011	Served in acting capacity during institutional transition following the pioneer administration.
3	Professor Labode Popoola	2011–2016	Oversaw expansion of academic programmes and postgraduate development of the University.
4	Professor Labo Popoola	2016–2021	Continued institutional reforms, research expansion, and multi-campus development of the University.
5	Professor Clement Odunayo Adebooye	2021–present	Current Vice-Chancellor; previously served as Deputy Vice-Chancellor (Academic).

== Ranking ==
Osun State University was ranked 6 out of 262 public universities in Nigeria.

== See also ==
- Osun State
- Osogbo
- Ikirun College of Health Technology
- Osun State Ministry of Education
