= Boripe =

- LGA
- Interactive map of Boripe
- Location in Nigeria
- Coordinates: 7°52′0″N 4°39′30″E
- Country: Nigeria
- State: Osun State
- Headquarter: Iragbiji

Government
  - Local Government Chairman and the Head of the Local Government Council: Odebunmi Sikiru

Area
  - Total: 132 km^{2} (51 sq mi)

Population (2006 census)
  - Total: 139,358
  - Density: 1,060/km^{2} (2,730/sq mi)
- Time zone: UTC+1 (WAT)
- 3-digit postal code prefix: 230
- ISO 3166 code: NG.OS.BP

Boripe is a Local Government Area in Osun State, Nigeria. Its headquarters are in the town of Iragbiji. The current chairman of the council is Odebunmi Sikiru.

It has an area of 132 km^{2} (51 sq mi) and a population of 139,358 at the 2006 census.

The postal code of the area is 230.

== Boripe North Local Council Development Area (LCDA) ==
Boripe North Local Council Development Area (LCDA) was created out of Boripe area council for administrative convenience, better development planning and to bring government closer to the grassroot. The LCDA is created by the Government of Osun State and is responsible for the funding of the council. The LCDA is headed by a chairman, vice chairman and other executive and legislative branches similar to the federally recognized local councils. The current chairman of the LCDA is Bamigbesin Isaac Oladejo.

== Boripe Local Government Chairmen from 1991 ==
The Boripe local government was created in 1991

- Prince Gboyega Famoodun
- Elder Bode Aremu
- Alhaji Kareem Adegboyega Afolabi
- Chief Adeniyi Aina
- Elder Ruben Ajayi
- Prince Bimbo Oyedele
- Hon. Kehinde Hassan Moronkeji
- Hon. Tajudeen Abiodun Ayantoye
- Hon. (Rev) Oyeyiola Adelani Adebayo
- Hon. Adeyemi Fatai Taiwo Emaagbadun
