= Osogbo =

Capital city of Osun State, Nigeria

Osogbo Osogbo Oroki
- LGA and city
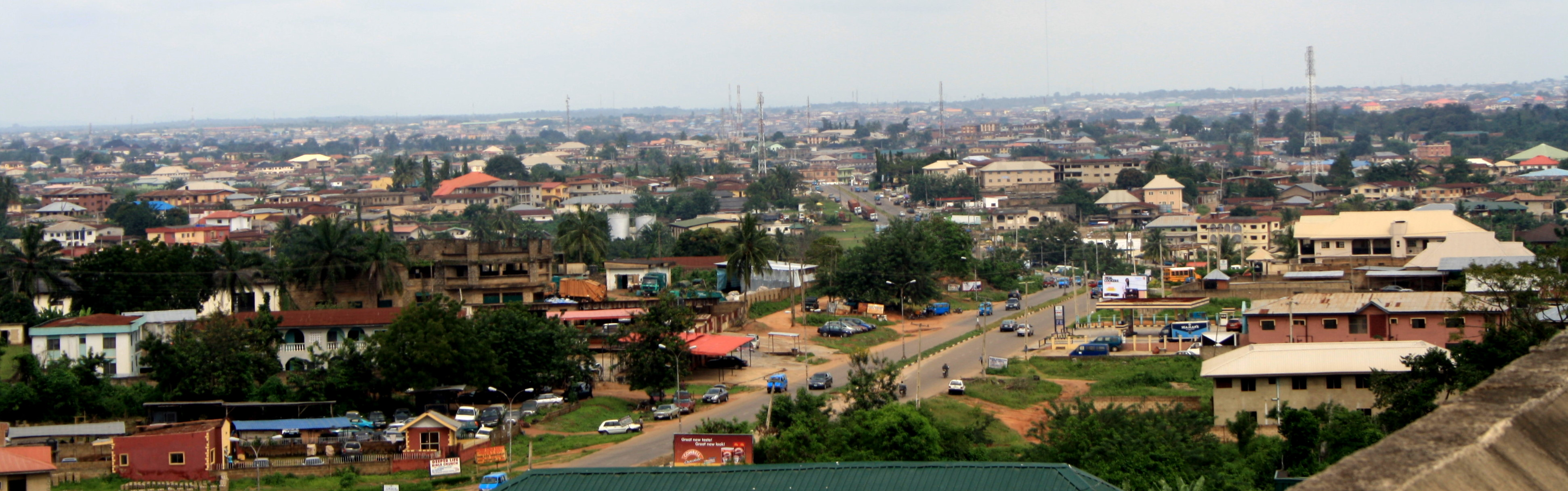
- Interactive map of Osogbo
- Location within Nigeria
- Coordinates: 7°46′N 4°34′E
- Country: Nigeria
- State: Osun
- LGAs: Olorunda; Osogbo

Government
  - Local Government Chairman: Onibonokuta Saheed M.

Area (LGA)
  - Total: 126 km^{2} (49 sq mi)
- Elevation: 320 m (1,050 ft)

Population (2022 est)
  - Total: 201,900
  - Density: 1,600/km^{2} (4,150/sq mi)
- Time zone: UTC+1 (WAT)
- 3-digit postal code prefix: 230
- ISO 3166 code: NG.OS.OS
- Climate: Aw
- National language: Yorùbá

Osogbo // (also known as Oṣogbo, and seldomly as Oshogbo) is a city in Nigeria. It became the capital city of Osun State in 1991. Osogbo city seats the Headquarters of both Osogbo Local Government Area (situated at Oke-Baale Area of the city) and Olorunda Local Government Area (situated at Igbonna Area of the city). It is some 88 kilometers by road northeast of Ibadan. It is also 108 kilometres (67 mi) by road south of Ilorin (capital and largest city of Kwara State) and 108 kilometres (67 mi) northwest of Akure. Osogbo shares boundaries with Ikirun, Ilesa, Ede, Ogbomosho and Iragbiji and it is easily accessible from any part of the state because of its central nature. It is about 48 km (29.83 mi) from Ife, 32 km (19.88 mi) from Ilesa, 46 km (28.59 mi) from Iwo, 48 km (29.83 mi) from Ikire and 46 km (28.59 mi) from Ila-Orangun; the city had a population of about 200,000 people and an approximate land area of 126 km (78.29 mi). The postal code of the area is 230. The current chairman of the council is in dispute.

== Osogbo South and Osogbo West LCDAs ==
Osogbo South and Osogbo West Local Council Development Areas (LCDAs) were created out of Osogbo council for administrative convenience, better development planning and to bring government closer to the grassroot. The LCDA is created by the Government of Osun State and is responsible for the funding of the council. The LCDA is headed by a chairman, vice chairman and other executive and legislative branches similar to the federally recognized local councils. The current chairmen of the LCDAs are Jimoh Bolanle F. (Osogbo South) and Olaniyan Ademola Akeem (Osogbo West).

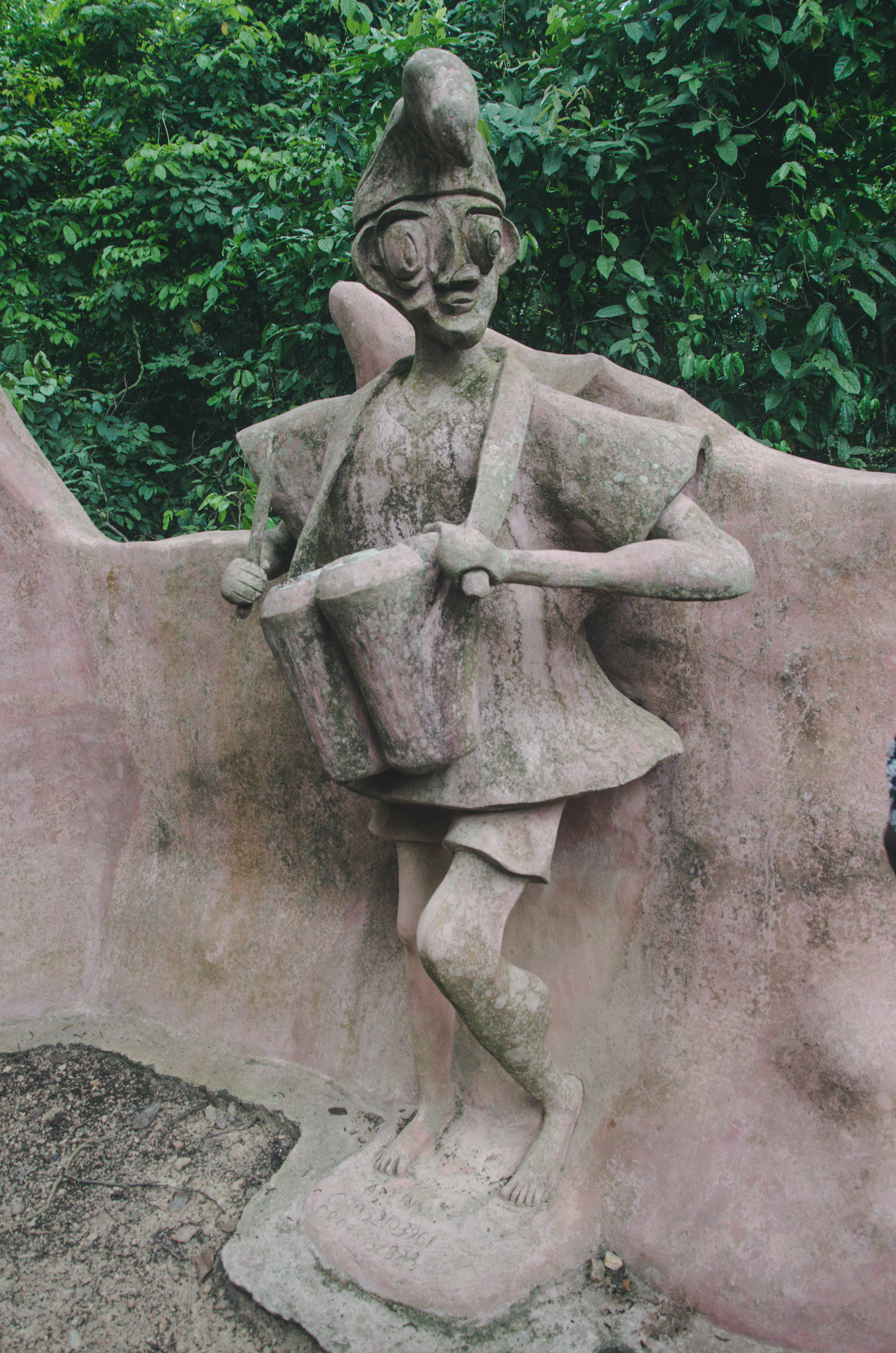
Sculpture at Osun Osogbo groove 06

== Infrastructure and demographics ==
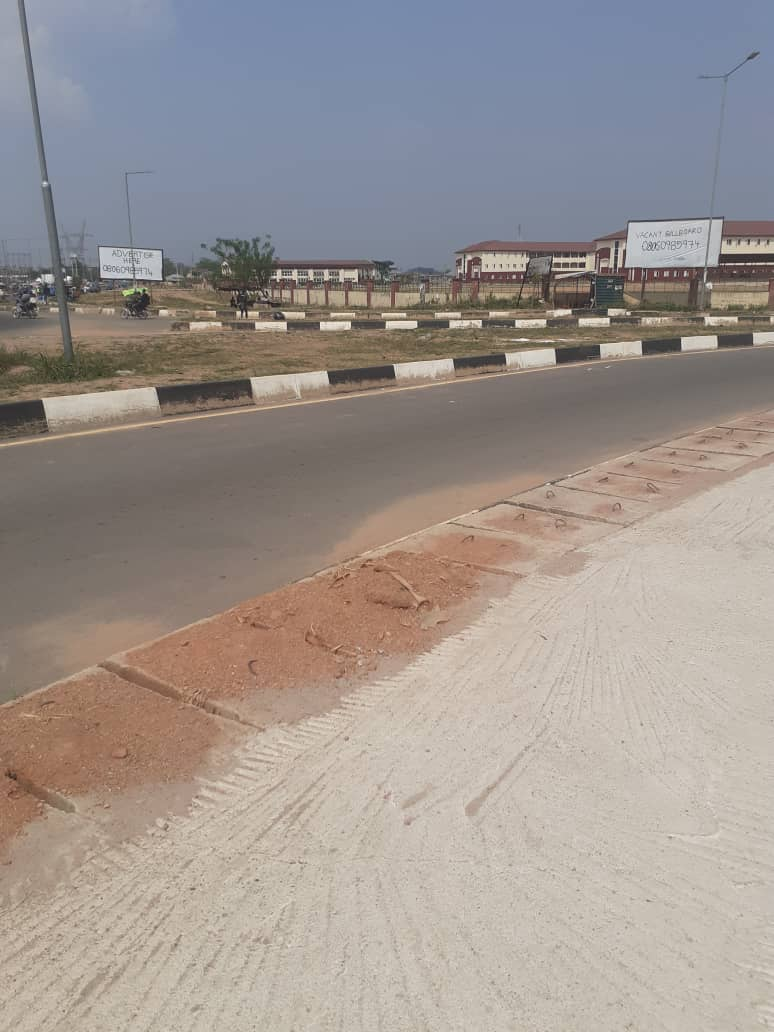
A picture of the old stadium road at Oshogbo

Osogbo lies on the railway line from Lagos to Kano. It is known for the Osogbo School of Art and the Oja Oba Market building, said to be the former Oba's palace, within yards of the Osogbo Grand Mosque.

Osogbo is the trade center for a farming region. Farm produce such as Yams, cassava, grain, and tobacco are grown. Cotton is grown and used to weave cloth. It is also home to several hotels and a football stadium with a capacity of 10,000 and a second division professional league team.

Most of the population are members of the Yoruba ethnic group. In 1988, about 27% of the population were engaged in farming as their primary occupation, 8% were traders and about 30% clerks and teachers.

== Culture ==
Osogbo, sometimes called "Ilu Aro" (Home of Tie and Dye), is a major dyeing center. The traditional industry is one of the major industries of Osogbo and the different types of Adire in Osogbo includes Raffia Resist-Adire Oniko, Stitch Resist-Adire Alabere, Starch Resist-Adire Eleko, Wax Batik-Adire Alabele. A number of industries also began to rise after independence, notably small scale establishments involved in textile, foam making, and pencils. Osogbo was made a major industrial development center by the government of Nigeria during the 1970s. Osogbo is also the childhood home of the actor and dramatist Duro Ladipo and the Muslim scholar Sheikh Adelabu.

Osogbo is the venue of the annual Osun-Osogbo festival along the River Osun. The festival is centered on the sacred grove of the river goddess Ọsun, which is a UNESCO World Heritage Site.

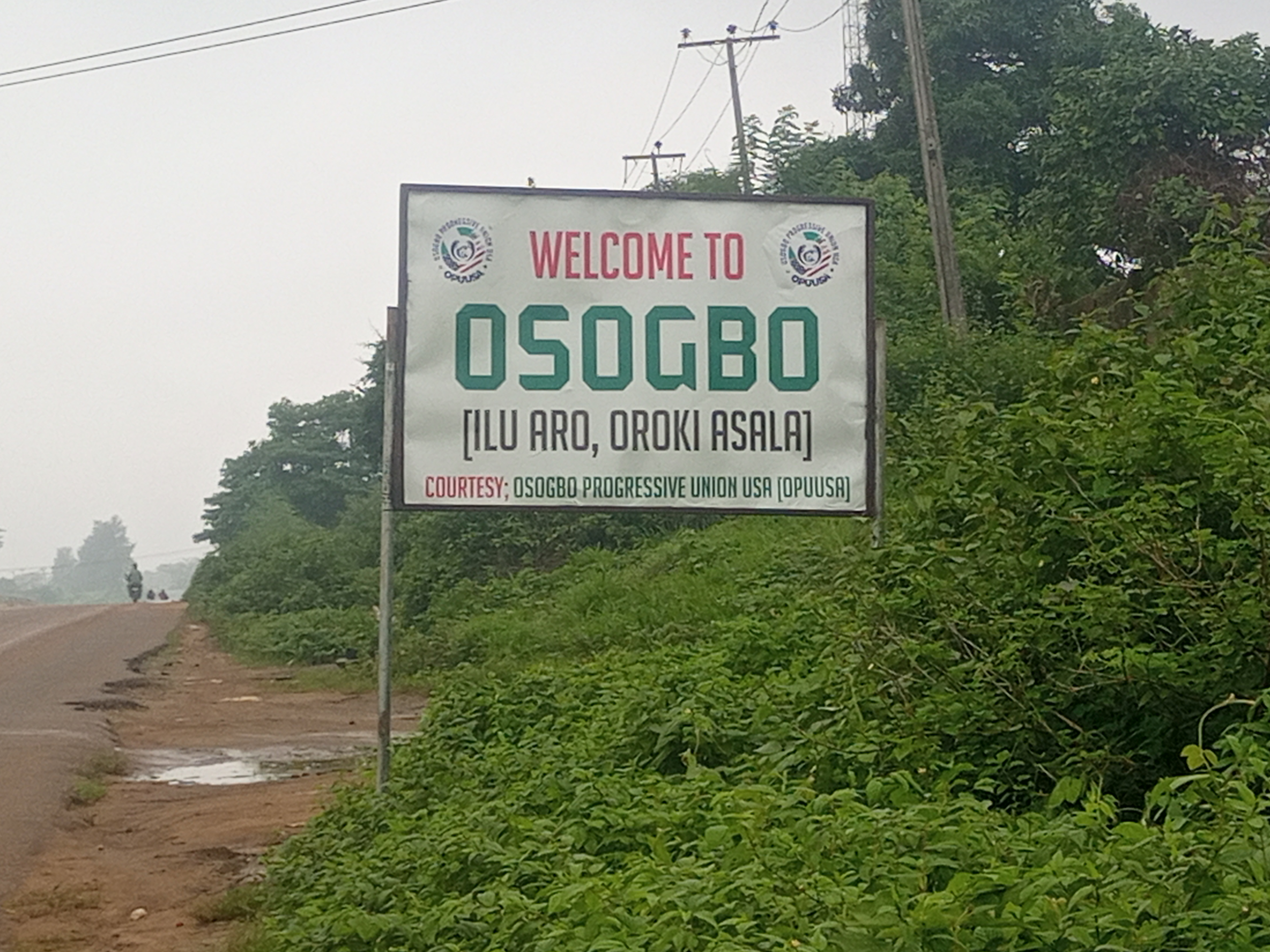
Osogbo signpost

The city is also home to several progressive groups and associations, such as the Osogbo Descendants Progressive Union (ODPU; formerly Osogbo Progressive Union - OPU), the Mbari Mbayo Club for African writers, artists and musicians, the Osogbo Professionals' Initiative (OPI), the Osogbo Affairs, the Osogbo Development Action Group (ODAG), the Osogbo National Students' Union (ONSU), the Oroki Social Club (OSC), the Ataoja Palace Project Initiative (APPI), the United Associates Osogbo and the Igbonna Progressive Club.

== Flooding ==
The citizens of Osogbo, Erin-Osun, and Ilobu, in particular, had no idea what lay in store for them when the heavens opened up for a rainstorm on Tuesday, 3 August 2021.

In contrast to earlier floods in the state, which were preceded by a warning from the Nigerian Meteorological Agency, the nearly 8-hour downpour struck like a robber in the night and left tales of grief, tears, and blood by morning. The state capital, Osogbo, was hardest hit, while the damage also spread to numerous other communities. Ibu-Amo, Oke-Arungbo, Odewale Junction, Oke-Ayepe, Powerline, Gbonmi, Oke-Baale, Obalende, Obate, Oke-Oniti Alekuwodo, and Oke Awesin in Erin-Osun were some of the most impacted localities as Osun River, Awesin stream, and Opopo stream overflowed their bounds.

== Climate ==
Osogbo has a tropical climate with rainfall and an average annual temperature of 25.5 degrees Celsius (77.8 degrees Fahrenheit) and 1361 millimetres (53.6 inches) of precipitation. Osogbo temperature at 30.28 °C (86.5 °F) and it is 0.82% higher than Nigeria's averages, typically receives about 136.44 millimetres (5.37 inches) of precipitation and has 253.78 rainy days (69.53% of the time) annually.

Climate data for Osogbo (1991-2020)
Month	Jan	Feb	Mar	Apr	May	Jun	Jul	Aug	Sep	Oct	Nov	Dec	Year
Record high °C (°F)	38.0 (100.4)	39.0 (102.2)	39.8 (103.6)	38.8 (101.8)	36.6 (97.9)	34.0 (93.2)	31.6 (88.9)	34.0 (93.2)	32.8 (91.0)	34.5 (94.1)	38.4 (101.1)	37.4 (99.3)	39.8 (103.6)
Mean daily maximum °C (°F)	33.9 (93.0)	35.2 (95.4)	34.7 (94.5)	32.9 (91.2)	31.6 (88.9)	30.0 (86.0)	28.2 (82.8)	27.8 (82.0)	29.0 (84.2)	30.4 (86.7)	32.7 (90.9)	33.5 (92.3)	31.6 (88.9)
Daily mean °C (°F)	26.4 (79.5)	28.4 (83.1)	28.8 (83.8)	27.9 (82.2)	27.0 (80.6)	25.9 (78.6)	24.8 (76.6)	24.4 (75.9)	25.1 (77.2)	25.9 (78.6)	27.1 (80.8)	26.4 (79.5)	26.5 (79.7)
Mean daily minimum °C (°F)	19.0 (66.2)	21.6 (70.9)	23.0 (73.4)	22.9 (73.2)	22.4 (72.3)	21.8 (71.2)	21.4 (70.5)	21.1 (70.0)	21.2 (70.2)	21.4 (70.5)	21.5 (70.7)	19.3 (66.7)	21.4 (70.5)
Record low °C (°F)	6.0 (42.8)	10.0 (50.0)	15.0 (59.0)	17.0 (62.6)	18.0 (64.4)	18.0 (64.4)	15.2 (59.4)	14.4 (57.9)	14.6 (58.3)	13.8 (56.8)	13.0 (55.4)	9.3 (48.7)	6.0 (42.8)
Average precipitation mm (inches)	6.4 (0.25)	25.9 (1.02)	80.3 (3.16)	112.5 (4.43)	165.8 (6.53)	190.1 (7.48)	184.9 (7.28)	128.7 (5.07)	228.0 (8.98)	207.5 (8.17)	38.2 (1.50)	11.2 (0.44)	1,379.6 (54.31)
Average precipitation days (≥ 1.0 mm)	0.5	1.9	5.4	7.7	11.2	12.5	12.5	10.6	16.3	15.6	3.1	0.9	98.1
Average relative humidity (%)	64.6	67.8	76.7	83.3	86.5	88.3	89.0	89.1	88.9	87.3	79.2	68.6	80.8
Source 1: NOAA
Source 2: Deutscher Wetterdienst (extremes)

== Pollution ==
Osogbo has been in celebration mood as a result of the cultural festival held annually in the state with cultural enthusiasts across the globe. However, contamination of the Osun river raises concerns about this year's event which made experts to consider this unfit for humans use.

The health implication of consuming water from the Osun river which is said to have heavy metal and cyanide thereby causing great safety concerns in Osogbo.

== History ==
Short oral story of Osogbo in Yoruba language by a native speaker

According to tradition, In Ipole Omu, seven rulers reigned before Olarooye in the following succession: Adefokanbale, Aikanya, Ogbogba, Saso, Luberin, Laege (also known as Adetuturinrin; father to both Lajomo and Larooye), Lajomo and Olarooye.

During the reign of Oba Olarooye at Ipole Omu, life became very unbearable because of incessant dry seasons. The then Ipole people became much dejected, worried and uncomfortable over the losses involving their farms, domestic animals and human beings. The Oba Olarooye was worried and disheartened by the situation at Ipole Omu. He wanted emergency solutions to inevitable and uncountable losses. This was the time he ordered the chief hunter at Ipole-in the person of Timehin-and his co-hunters to go on expedition and look for greener pastures. Timehin and the other hunters courageously took up the challenge and moved out in search of a better place for settlement. This expedition discovered River Osun.

Yoruba tradition claims many people fleeing the Fulani Invasion settled at Osogbo following the fall of old Oyo. As a result, Osogbo increased in population largely due to migration from other Yoruba towns.

For want of a more open place than a grove and a more central location, Olarooye and his people abandoned their settlement, including the already flourishing market and moved to Ode-Osogbo. At Ode-Osogbo, Olarooye built his new palace at the present-day Idi-Osun while Timehin built the Ogun shrine now known as Idi-Ogun. Since then, Osogbo has maintained its function as an economic center.

== List of Ataojas (traditional kings) ==
The Ataoja which means the one that "stretches out his hand and takes the fish" is the traditional ruler of the people of Osogbo. The following is the list of the Ataojas of Osogbo, with the dates of their rule:

- Oba Larooye Gbadewolu (died 1760)
- Oba Sogbodede (died 1780)
- Aina Serebu (1780–1810)
- Abogbe (1810–1812; as Regent, she reigned but did not assume the title Ataoja)
- Obodegbewale (1812–1815; as Regent)
- Oba Lahanmi Oyipi (1815–1840)
- Oba Ojo Adio Okege (1840–1854)
- Oba Oladejobi Oladele Matanmi I (1854–1864)
- Oba Fabode.Durosinmi Ogunnike (1864–1891)
- Oba Bamigbola Alao (1891–1893)
- Oba Ajayi Olosunde Oyetona (1893–1903)
- Oba Atanda Olukeye Olugbeja Matanmi II (1903–1917)
- Oba Kofoworola Ajadi Latona I (1918–1920)
- Oba Alabi Kolawole (1920–1933)
- Oba Samuel Oyedokun Latona II (1933–1943)
- Oba Samuel Adeleye Adenle I (1944–1976)
- Oba Iyiola Oyewale Matanmi III (1976–2010)
- Oba Jimoh Oyetunji Laaroye II (2010–present)

== Notable people ==
- Murphy Afolabi (1974-2023), actor, screenwriter, film director and film producer
