= 2015 Nigerian Senate elections in Ogun State =

2015 Nigerian Senate election in Ogun State

The 2015 Nigerian Senate election in Ogun State held on February 23, 2015, to elect members of the Nigerian Senate to represent Ogun State. Lanre Tejuosho representing Ogun Central and Joseph Dada representing Ogun West won on the platform of the All Progressives Congress while Buruji Kashamu representing Ogun East won on the platform of the Peoples Democratic Party

== Overview ==
Affiliation	Party		Total
Affiliation	ACN	PDP	Total
Before Election	3	0	3
After Election	2	1	3

== Summary ==
District	Incumbent	Party	Elected Senator	Party
Ogun East	Sefiu Adegbenga Kaka	ACN	Buruji Kashamu	PDP
Ogun Central	Olugbenga Onaolapo Obadara	ACN	Lanre Tejuosho	APC
Ogun West	Akin Babalola Kamar Odunsi	ACN	Joseph Dada	APC

== Results ==
=== Ogun East ===
PDP candidate Buruju Kashamu won the election, defeating APC candidate Dapo Abiodun. Kashamu of PDP won the election defeating APC candidate, Abiodun.

2015 Nigerian Senate election in Ogun State
Party	Candidate	Votes	%
PDP	Buruju Kashamu	-	-
APC	Dapo Abiodun	-	-

=== Ogun Central ===
APC candidate Lanre Tejuosho won the election, defeating PDP candidate Abisola Sodipo-Clark.

2015 Nigerian Senate election in Ogun State
Party	Candidate	Votes	%
APC	Lanre Tejuosho	-	-
PDP	Abisola Sodipo-Clark	-	-

=== Ogun West ===
APC candidate Joseph Dada won the election, defeating PDP candidate Waliu Taiwo.

2015 Nigerian Senate election in Ogun State
Party	Candidate	Votes	%
APC	Gbolahan Dada	-	-
PDP	Waliu Taiwo	-	-
