= Tejuosho =

- Gender: Unisex
- Language: Yoruba

Origin
- Origin: Nigeria
- Meaning: I have a crown to rejoice
- Region of origin: South western Nigeria

Other names
- Variant forms: Tejuoso, Teju, Osho

Tejuosho or Tejuoso Audio is a Nigerian unisex name of yoruba origin. It's translated in English to mean ‘I have a crown to rejoice'. It signifies someone who is destined for greatness and triumph.

== Notable people with this name ==
- Adedapo Tejuoso, Nigerian monarch
- Bisoye Tejuoso (1916-1996), Nigerian businesswoman, mother of Adedapo
- Funmi Tejuosho (born 1965), Nigerian politician, sister-in-law of Lanre
- Lanre Tejuosho (born 1964), Nigerian politician, son of Adedapo

== Places with this name ==
- Tejuosho Market in Nigeria
