= 2007 Nigerian Senate elections in Ogun State =

The 2007 Nigerian Senate election in Ogun State was held on 21 April 2007, to elect members of the Nigerian Senate to represent Ogun State. Iyabo Obasanjo representing Ogun Central and Ramoni Mustapha representing Ogun East won on the platform of Peoples Democratic Party, while Felix Bajomo representing Ogun West won on the platform of the Action Congress.

== Overview ==
| Affiliation | Party | | Total |
| Affiliation | PDP | AC | Total |
|---|---|---|---|
| Before Election | | | 3 |
| After Election | 2 | 1 | 3 |

== Summary ==
| District | Incumbent | Party | Elected Senator | Party |
|---|---|---|---|---|
| Ogun Central | | | Iyabo Obasanjo | PDP |
| Ogun East | | | Ramoni Mustapha | PDP |
| Ogun West | | | Felix Bajomo | AC |

== Results ==
=== Ogun Central ===
The election was won by Iyabo Obasanjo of the Peoples Democratic Party.

2007 Nigerian Senate election in Ogun State
| Party | Candidate | Votes | % |
|---|---|---|---|
| PDP | Iyabo Obasanjo | | |
| Total votes | | | |
| PDP hold | | | |

=== Lagos East ===
The election was won by Ramoni Mustapha of the Peoples Democratic Party.

2007 Nigerian Senate election in Ogun State
| Party | Candidate | Votes | % |
|---|---|---|---|
| PDP | Ramoni Mustapha | | |
| Total votes | | | |
| PDP hold | | | |

=== Ogun West ===
The election was won by Felix Bajomo of the Action Congress.

2007 Nigerian Senate election in Ogun State
| Party | Candidate | Votes | % |
|---|---|---|---|
| AC | Felix Bajomo | | |
| Total votes | | | |
| AC hold | | | |
