= Davis, California =

City in California, United States

- City
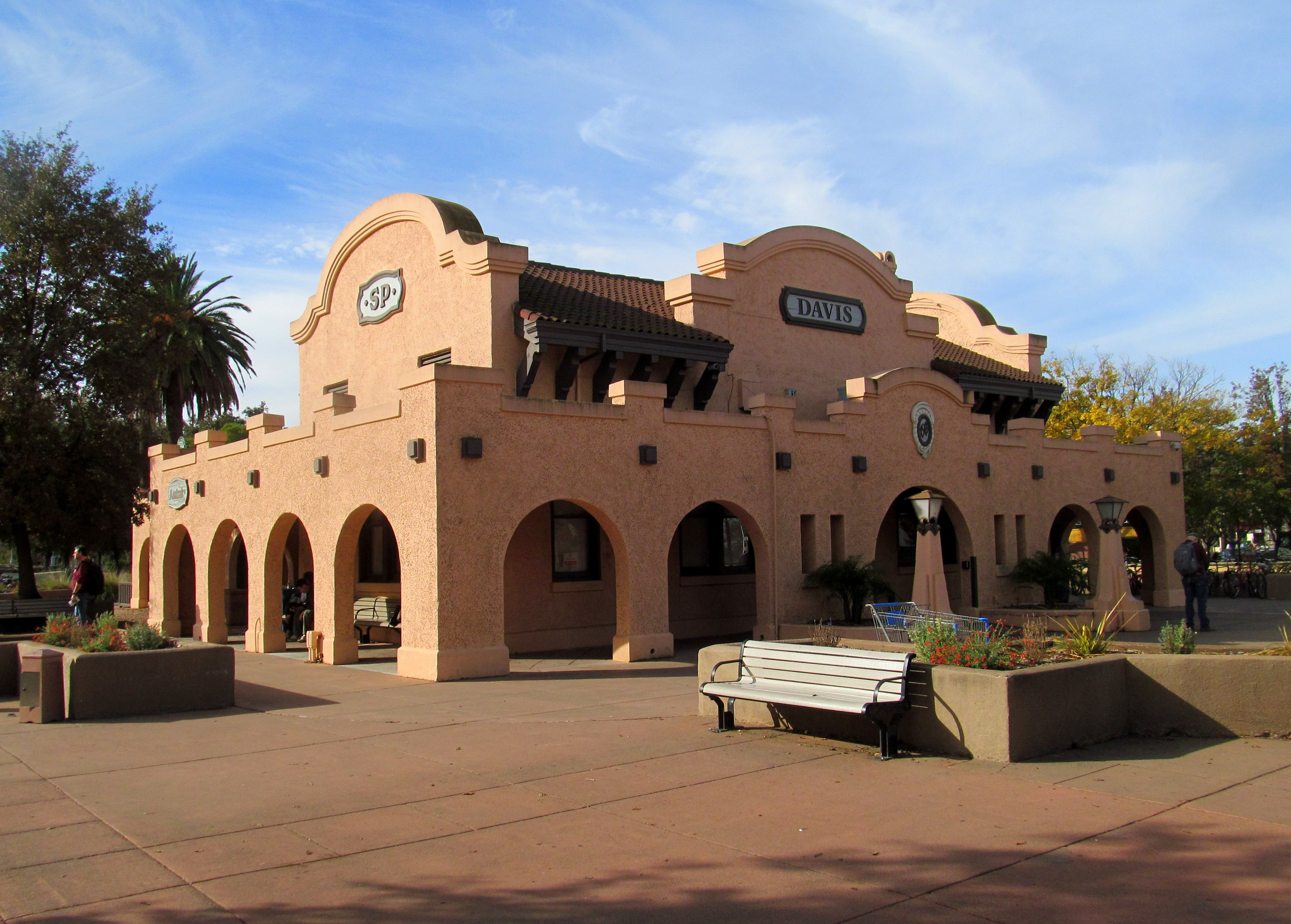
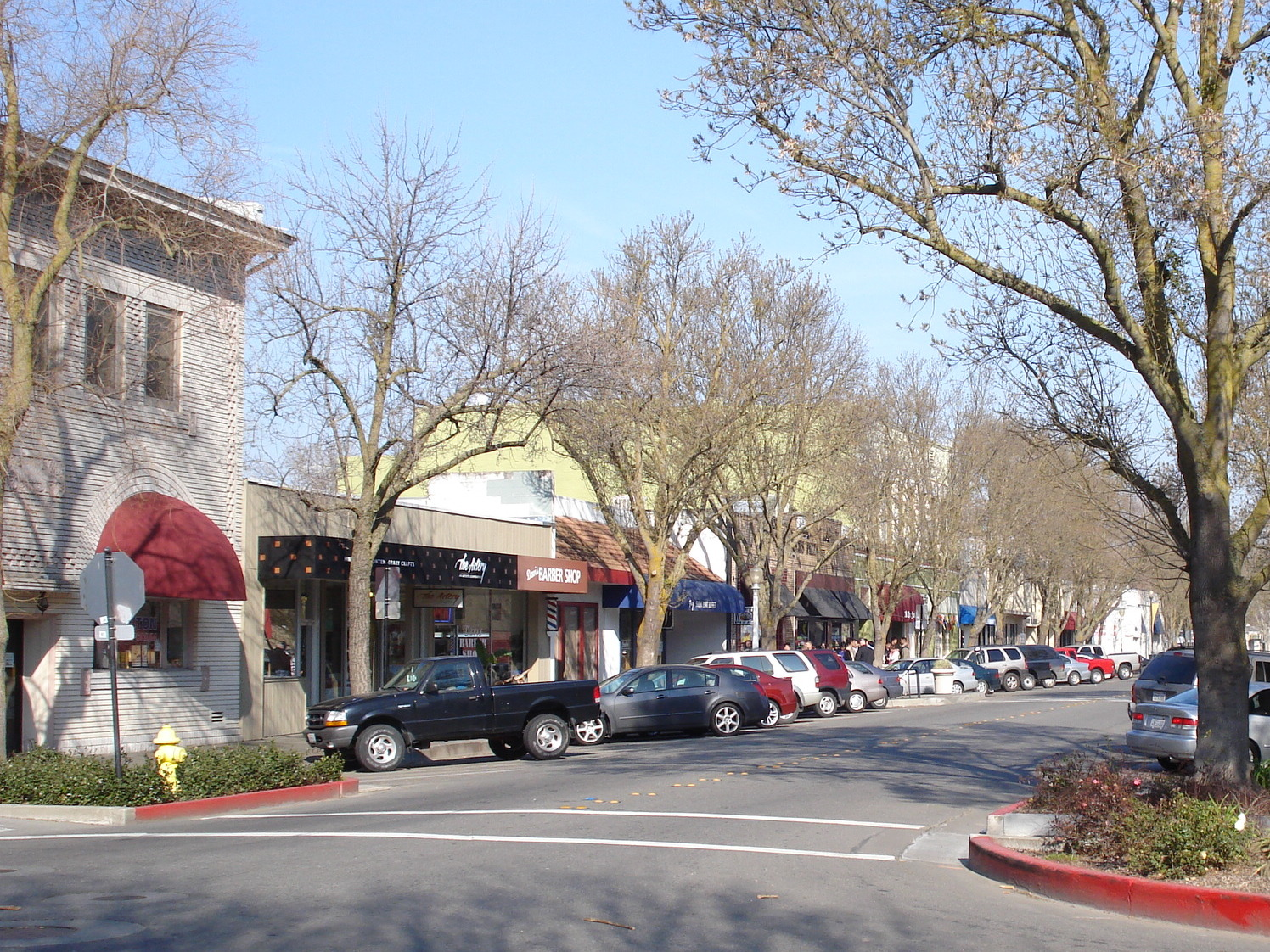
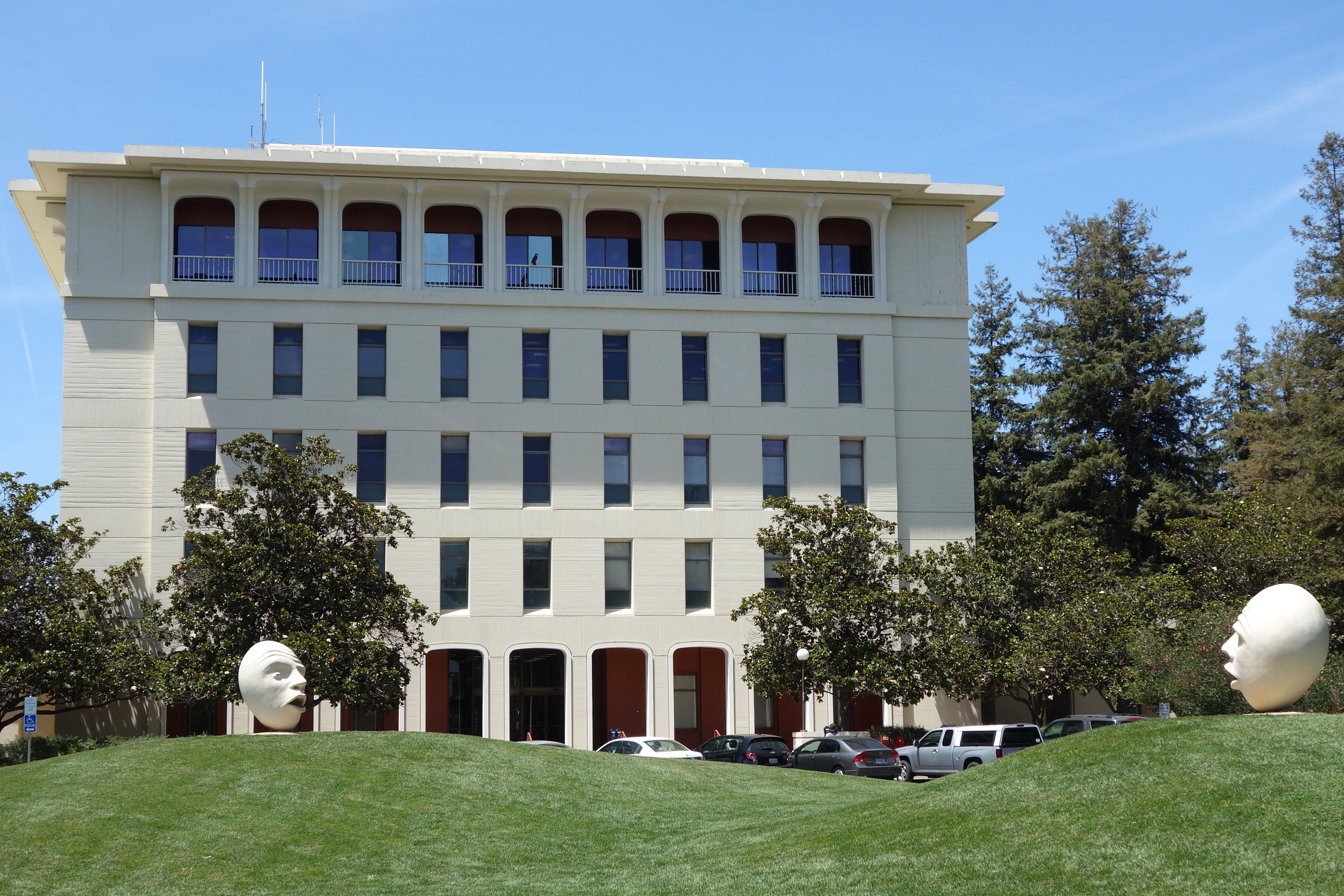
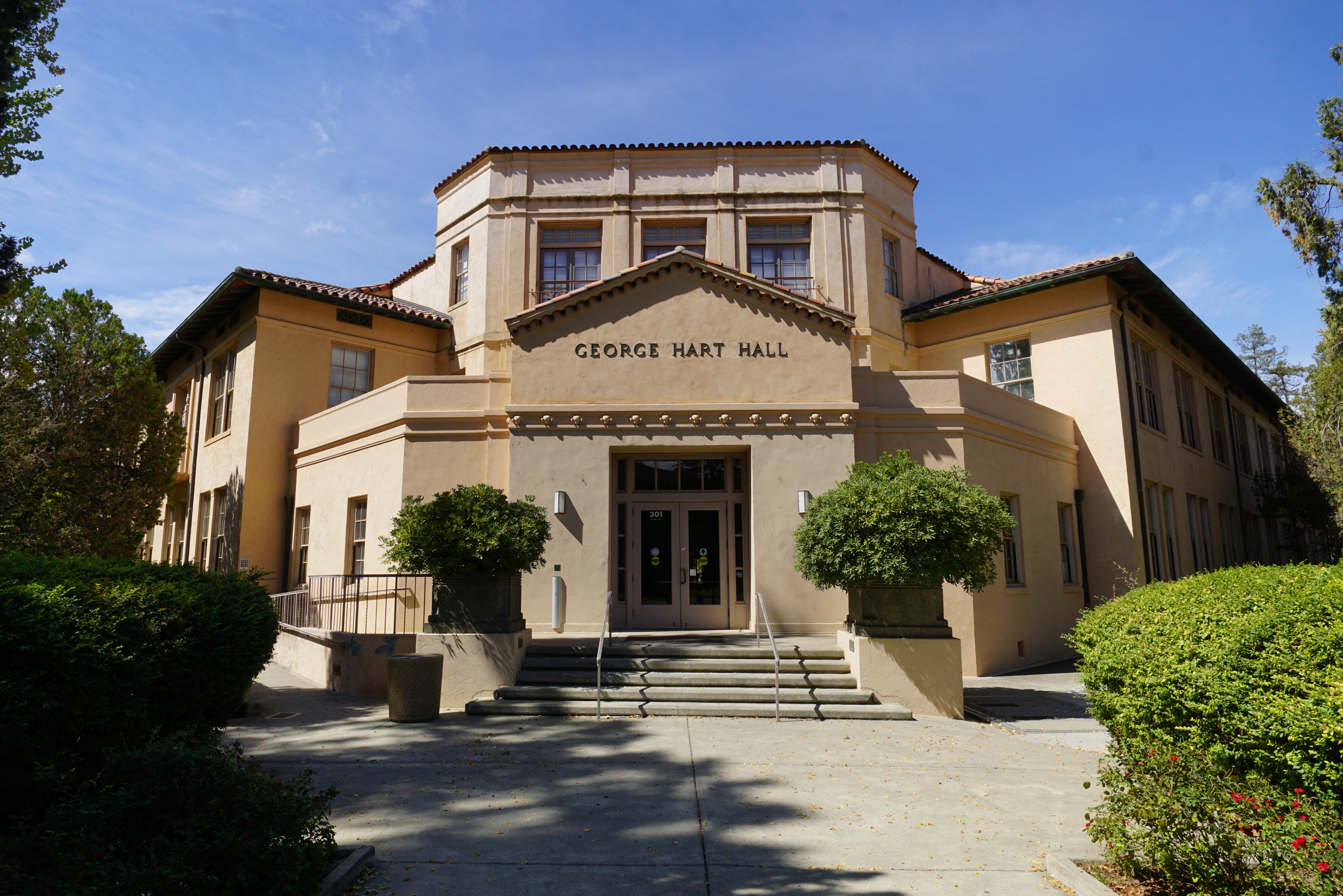
- Top: Davis Station (left) and Downtown (right); bottom: University of California, Davis

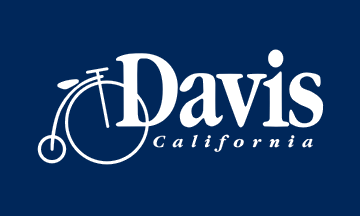
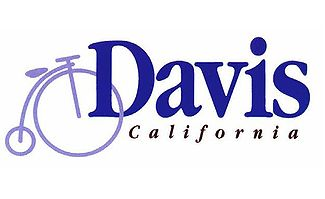
- Flag Logo
- Anthem: The Davis Song
- Interactive map of Davis, California
- Location in the State of California Location in the contiguous United States
- Coordinates: 38°33′14″N 121°44′17″W
- Country: United States
- State: California
- County: Yolo
- Rail depot: 1868
- Incorporated: March 28, 1917
- Named for: Jerome C. Davis

Government
  - Mayor: Donna Neville
  - State senator: Christopher Cabaldon (D)
  - Assemblymember: Cecilia Aguiar-Curry (D)

Area
  - Total: 10.01 sq mi (25.92 km^{2})
  - Land: 9.97 sq mi (25.83 km^{2})
  - Water: 0.035 sq mi (0.09 km^{2}) 0.35%
- Elevation: 52 ft (16 m)

Population (2020)
  - Total: 66,850
  - Density: 6,704.0/sq mi (2,588.44/km^{2})
- Demonym: Davisite
- Time zone: UTC−8 (Pacific)
  - Summer (DST): UTC−7 (PDT)
- ZIP Codes: 95616–95618
- Area code: 530, 837
- FIPS code: 06-18100
- GNIS feature IDs: 277498, 2410296
- Website: cityofdavis.org
- Official flower Lupinus microcarpus var. densiflorus 'Ed Gedling' (Golden lupine)

Davis is the most populous city in Yolo County, California, United States. Located in the Sacramento Valley region of Northern California, the city had a population of 66,850 in 2020, not including the on-campus population of the University of California, Davis, which was over 9,400 (not including students' families) in 2016. As of 2023, there were 40,850 students enrolled at the university, which is known as the biking capital of America.

== History ==
Davis sits on land that was historically inhabited by Indigenous people associated with the Clovis culture. The Patwin, a southern branch of Wintun people, eventually displaced existing Indigenous tribes. The Patwin were subsequently displaced by the American and Mexican government in the 1830s as part of the California genocide. Patwin burial grounds have been found across Davis, including on the site of the UC Davis Mondavi Center. Territory that eventually became Davis emerged from ranchos, Laguna de Santos Callé. Jerome C. Davis, a prominent farmer and one of the early claimants to land in Laguna de Santos Callé, lobbied to the United States Congress to retain the land that eventually became Davis. Davis became a depot on the Southern Pacific Railroad in 1868, when it was named Davisville after Jerome C. Davis. The post office at Davisville shortened the town name to "Davis" in 1907. The name stuck, and the city of Davis was incorporated on March 28, 1917.

From its inception as a farming community, Davis is known primarily for its contributions to agricultural science and policy along with veterinary care and animal husbandry. Following the passage of the University Farm Bill in 1905 by the California State Legislature, Governor George Pardee selected Davis out of 50 other sites as the future home to the University of California's University Farm, officially opening to students in 1908. The farm, later renamed the Northern Branch of the College of Agriculture in 1922, was upgraded to become the seventh UC general campus, the University of California, Davis, in 1959.

== Geography ==
=== Location ===
Davis is located in Yolo County, 11 mi (18 km) west of Sacramento, 70 mi (113 km) northeast of San Francisco, 385 mi (619 km) north of Los Angeles, at the intersection of Interstate 80 and State Route 113. Neighboring towns include Dixon, Winters, Woodland and West Sacramento.

Davis lies in the Sacramento Valley, the northern portion of the Central Valley, in Northern California, at a mean elevation of approximately 52 feet (16 m) above sea level.

According to the United States Census Bureau, the city has a total area of 10.0 square miles (26 km^{2}), of which 10.0 square miles (26 km^{2}) is land and 0.03 square miles (0.078 km^{2}) , or 0.35%, is water.

The topography is flat, which has helped Davis to become known as a haven for bicyclists.

=== Climate ===
The Davis climate resembles that of nearby Sacramento and is typical of California's Central Valley Mediterranean climate region: warm and dry in the spring, summer and autumn, and cool and wet in the winter. It is classified as a Köppen Csa climate. Summer days are hot, ranging from 85 to 105 °F (29 to 41 °C), but the nights turn pleasantly cool, almost always dropping below 70 °F (21 °C). The Delta Breeze, a flow of cool marine air originating from the Pacific Ocean via San Francisco Bay and the Sacramento–San Joaquin River Delta, frequently provides relief in the evening. Winter temperatures generally reach between 45 and 65 °F (7 and 18 °C) in the afternoon; nights average at about 35 to 40 °F (2 to 4 °C), but occasionally fall below freezing.

Average temperatures range from 46 °F (8 °C) in December and January to 75 °F (24 °C) in July and August. Thick ground fog called tule fog settles into Davis during late fall and winter. This fog can be dense, with near zero visibility. As in other areas of Northern California, the tule fog is a leading cause of road accidents in the winter season.

Mean rainfall per annum is about 20 inches (510 mm). The bulk of the rainfall occurs between about mid-November to mid-March, with typically no precipitation falling from mid-June to mid-September.

Record temperatures range from a high of 116 °F (47 °C) on July 17, 1925, to a low of 12 °F (−11 °C) on December 11, 1932.

Climate data for Davis, California, 1991–2020 normals, extremes 1893–present
Month	Jan	Feb	Mar	Apr	May	Jun	Jul	Aug	Sep	Oct	Nov	Dec	Year
Record high °F (°C)	88 (31)	90 (32)	92 (33)	98 (37)	108 (42)	115 (46)	116 (47)	114 (46)	116 (47)	105 (41)	90 (32)	88 (31)	116 (47)
Mean maximum °F (°C)	65.4 (18.6)	71.4 (21.9)	79.3 (26.3)	88.2 (31.2)	96.1 (35.6)	103.1 (39.5)	105.3 (40.7)	104.8 (40.4)	102.2 (39.0)	93.8 (34.3)	79.2 (26.2)	66.0 (18.9)	107.2 (41.8)
Mean daily maximum °F (°C)	55.5 (13.1)	60.7 (15.9)	66.3 (19.1)	72.5 (22.5)	81.1 (27.3)	88.6 (31.4)	93.3 (34.1)	92.8 (33.8)	89.8 (32.1)	79.9 (26.6)	65.4 (18.6)	56.0 (13.3)	75.2 (24.0)
Daily mean °F (°C)	46.9 (8.3)	50.9 (10.5)	55.1 (12.8)	59.6 (15.3)	66.3 (19.1)	72.2 (22.3)	75.3 (24.1)	74.6 (23.7)	72.3 (22.4)	64.7 (18.2)	54.0 (12.2)	47.0 (8.3)	61.6 (16.4)
Mean daily minimum °F (°C)	38.4 (3.6)	41.0 (5.0)	43.9 (6.6)	46.6 (8.1)	51.6 (10.9)	55.8 (13.2)	57.3 (14.1)	56.3 (13.5)	54.8 (12.7)	49.6 (9.8)	42.5 (5.8)	37.9 (3.3)	48.0 (8.9)
Mean minimum °F (°C)	29.2 (−1.6)	31.6 (−0.2)	34.5 (1.4)	36.9 (2.7)	43.0 (6.1)	47.5 (8.6)	50.8 (10.4)	50.1 (10.1)	46.6 (8.1)	40.2 (4.6)	31.9 (−0.1)	28.2 (−2.1)	26.4 (−3.1)
Record low °F (°C)	16 (−9)	21 (−6)	26 (−3)	25 (−4)	32 (0)	34 (1)	37 (3)	37 (3)	35 (2)	26 (−3)	20 (−7)	12 (−11)	12 (−11)
Average precipitation inches (mm)	4.02 (102)	3.90 (99)	2.70 (69)	1.15 (29)	0.73 (19)	0.25 (6.4)	0.01 (0.25)	0.04 (1.0)	0.09 (2.3)	0.75 (19)	1.78 (45)	3.74 (95)	19.16 (486.95)
Average precipitation days (≥ 0.01 in)	12.3	10.4	8.8	5.0	3.3	1.3	0.1	0.1	0.8	3.0	6.9	11.2	63.2
Source 1: NOAA
Source 2: National Weather Service

=== Neighborhoods ===
Davis is internally divided by two freeways (Interstate 80 and State Route 113), a north–south railroad (California Northern), an east–west mainline (Union Pacific) and several major streets. The city is unofficially divided into six main districts made up of smaller neighborhoods (often originally named as housing subdivisions):

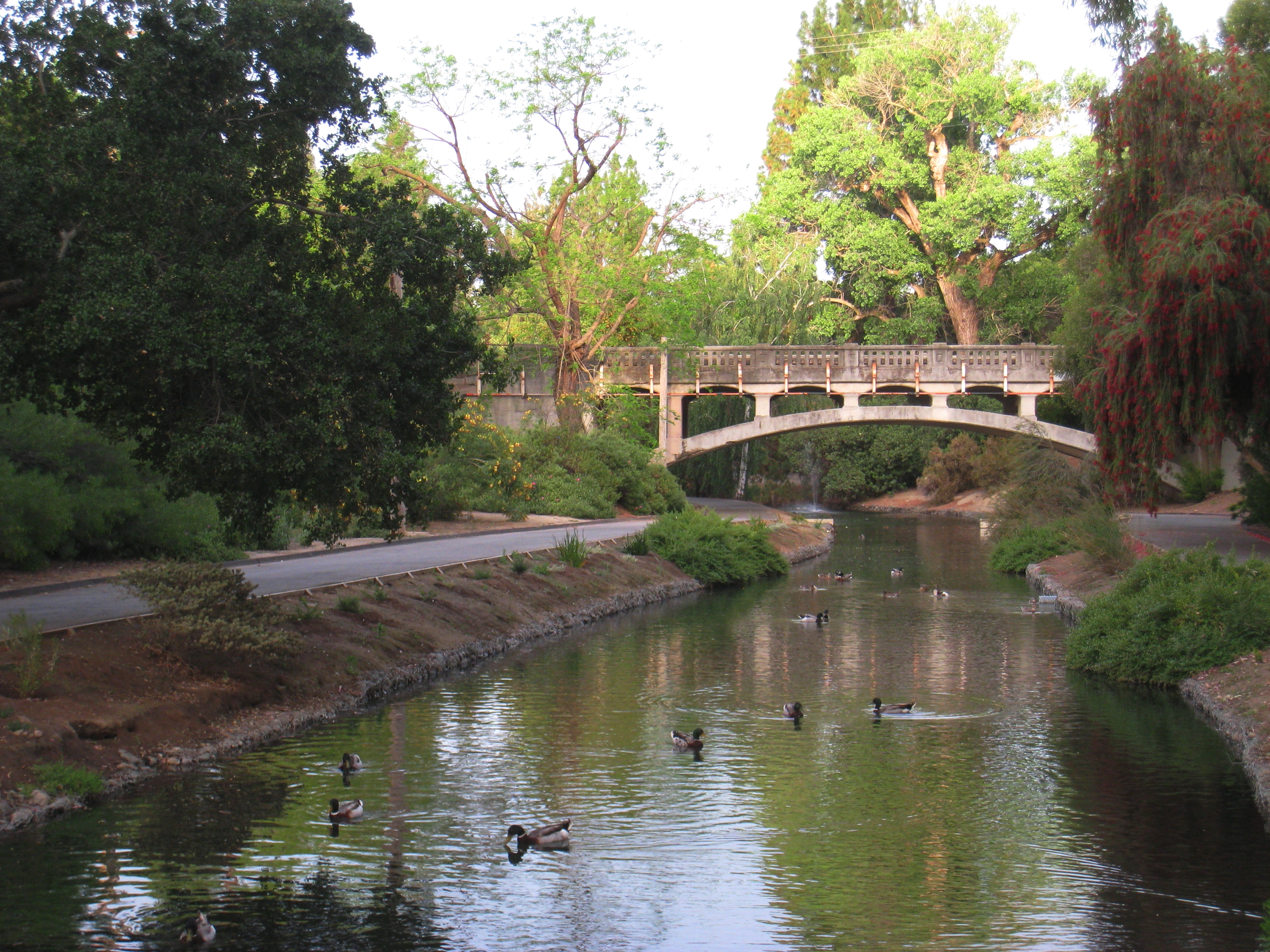
The UC Davis Arboretum

- Central Davis, north of Fifth Street and Russell Boulevard, south of Covell Blvd., east of SR 113, and west of the railroad tracks running along G Street. Within these boundaries is the officially denoted neighborhood of Old North Davis, which is sometimes also considered part of Downtown.
- Downtown Davis, roughly the numbered-and-lettered grid north of I-80, south of Fifth Street, east of A Street, and west of the railroad tracks, including the Aggie Village and Olive Drive areas.
- East Davis, north of I-80, south of Covell Blvd., and east of the railroad tracks. It includes the older, 'inner' East Davis of lettered streets and neighborhoods such as Davis Manor, Chestnut, and Rancho Yolo, as well as more distinctly identified (in some cases walled-in) subdivisions such as Mace Ranch, Lake Alhambra Estates, and Wildhorse.
- North Davis, north of Covell Blvd. North Davis includes Covell Park, Senda Nueva, Northstar, and North Davis Farms.
- South Davis, south of I-80, and includes Willowbank. El Macero, California, although outside the city limits, is sometimes considered part of South Davis; El Macero is part of the Davis Joint Unified School District, and El Macero children who attend public schools attend Davis's public schools.
- West Davis, north of I-80 and west of SR 113. West Davis includes Westwood, Evergreen, Aspen, Stonegate (west of Lake Boulevard and including Stonegate Lake and the Stonegate Country Club) and the eco-friendly Village Homes development, known for its solar-powered houses.

The University of California, Davis is located south of Russell Boulevard and west of A Street and then south of 1st Street. The land occupied by the university is not incorporated within the boundaries of the city of Davis and lies within both Yolo and Solano counties.

=== Environment ===
Local energy planning began in Davis after the energy crisis of 1973. A new building code promoted energy efficiency. Energy use in buildings decreased dramatically and in 1981 Davis citizens won a $100,000 prize from utility PG&E, for cutting electricity use during the summer peak.

On November 14, 1984, the Davis City Council declared the city to be a nuclear-free zone. In 1998, the City passed a "Dark Skies" ordinance in an effort to reduce light pollution in the night sky.

In 2013, Davis became part of the state Cool Roof Initiative with the "CoolDavis" campaign, requiring all new roofing projects to meet Cool Roof Rating Council (CRRC) requirements, including the installation of light-colored roofs. The aim is to reflect more sunlight back into space via the albedo effect, and reduce the amount of heat absorbed in hopes of limiting climate change.

=== Toad Tunnel ===
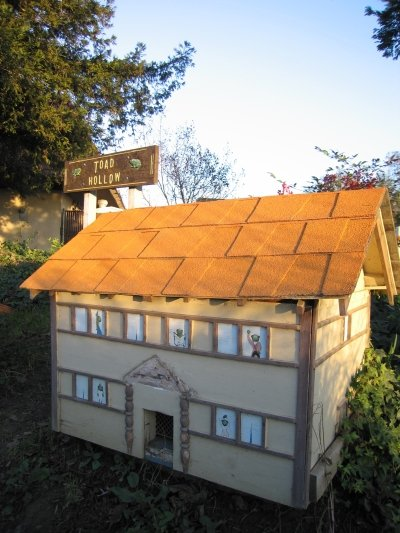
Entrance to the Toad Tunnel in front of the Post Office

Davis's Toad Tunnel is a wildlife crossing that was constructed in 1995 and has drawn much attention over the years, including a mention on The Daily Show. Due to the construction of an overpass, animal lovers worried about toads being killed by cars commuting from South Davis to North Davis, since the toads traveled from one side of a dirt lot (which the overpass replaced) to the reservoir at the other end. After much controversy, a decision was made to build a toad tunnel, which runs beneath the Pole Line Road overpass which crosses Interstate 80. The project cost $14,000, equivalent to $30,000 in 2025. The tunnel is 21 inches (53 cm) wide and 18 inches (46 cm) high.

== Demographics ==
Historical population
Census	Pop.	Note	%±
1880	441		—
1890	547		24.0%
1920	939		—
1930	1,243		32.4%
1940	1,672		34.5%
1950	3,554		112.6%
1960	8,910		150.7%
1970	23,488		163.6%
1980	36,640		56.0%
1990	46,209		26.1%
2000	60,308		30.5%
2010	65,622		8.8%
2020	66,850		1.9%
2025 (est.)	66,110	▼	−1.1%
U.S. Decennial Census; 1860–1870 1880-1890; 1900 1910 1920; 1930 1940 1950; 1960 1970 1980; 1990 2000 2010

Davis is part of the Sacramento metropolitan area.

=== 2020 census ===
As of the 2020 census, Davis had a population of 66,850. The population density was 6,703.8 inhabitants per square mile (2,588.4/km^{2}). The age distribution was 16.0% under the age of 18, 27.8% aged 18 to 24, 24.0% aged 25 to 44, 18.2% aged 45 to 64, and 13.9% who were 65 years of age or older. The median age was 28.1 years. For every 100 females, there were 89.0 males, and for every 100 females age 18 and over, there were 86.0 males age 18 and over.

The census reported that 96.7% of the population lived in households, 2.8% lived in non-institutionalized group quarters, and 0.6% were institutionalized. 100.0% of residents lived in urban areas, while 0.0% lived in rural areas.

There were 25,667 households, of which 24.5% included children under the age of 18. Of all households, 38.7% were married-couple households, 6.6% were cohabiting-couple households, 32.9% had a female householder with no spouse or partner present, and 21.8% had a male householder with no spouse or partner present. About 25.2% of households were one person, and 9.1% were one person aged 65 or older. The average household size was 2.52. There were 13,229 families (51.5% of all households).

There were 27,066 housing units at an average density of 2,714.2 units per square mile (1,048.0 units/km^{2}), of which 25,667 (94.8%) were occupied. Of these, 43.5% were owner-occupied, and 56.5% were occupied by renters. Of all housing units, 5.2% were vacant. The homeowner vacancy rate was 0.7% and the rental vacancy rate was 3.6%.

Racial composition as of the 2020 census
Race	Number	Percent
White	36,581	54.7%
Black or African American	1,651	2.5%
American Indian and Alaska Native	473	0.7%
Asian	14,770	22.1%
Native Hawaiian and Other Pacific Islander	111	0.2%
Some other race	4,863	7.3%
Two or more races	8,401	12.6%
Hispanic or Latino (of any race)	11,343	17.0%

=== 2023 ACS estimates ===
In 2023, the US Census Bureau estimated that the median household income was $87,421, and the per capita income was $50,060. About 5.3% of families and 25.1% of the population were below the poverty line.

=== 2010 census ===
The 2010 United States census reported that Davis had a population of 65,622. The population density was 6,615.8 inhabitants per square mile (2,554.4/km^{2}). The racial makeup of Davis was 42,571 (64.9%) White, 1,528 (2.3%) African American, 339 (0.5%) Native American, 14,355 (21.9%) Asian, 136 (0.2%) Pacific Islander, 3,121 (4.8%) from other races, and 3,572 (5.4%) from two or more races. Hispanic or Latino of any race were 8,172 persons (12.5%).

Davis's Asian population of 14,355 was apportioned among 1,631 Indian Americans, 6,395 Chinese Americans, 1,560 Korean Americans, 1,185 Vietnamese Americans, 1,033 Filipino Americans, 953 Japanese Americans, and 1,598 other Asian Americans.

Davis's Hispanic and Latino population of 8,172 was apportioned among 5,618 Mexican American, 221 Puerto Rican American, 80 Cuban American, and 2,253 other Hispanic and Latino.

Davis, California population reported at 2010 United States census
Race	Total; Population	Not; Hispanic or Latino	Hispanic or Latino
White	42,571	38,641	3,930
African; American	1,528	1,415	113
Native; American	339	166	173
Asian	14,355	14,213	142
Pacific; Islander	136	120	16
other races	3,121	181	2,940
two or more races	3,572	2,714	858

The census reported that 63,522 people (96.8% of the population) lived in households, 1,823 (2.8%) lived in non-institutionalized group quarters, and 277 (0.4%) were institutionalized.

There were 24,873 households, of which 6,119 (24.6%) had children under the age of 18 living in them, 9,343 (37.6%) were opposite-sex married couples living together, 1,880 (7.6%) had a female householder with no husband present, and 702 (2.8%) had a male householder with no wife present. There were 1,295 (5.2%) unmarried opposite-sex partnerships, and 210 (0.8%) same-sex married couples or partnerships. 5,952 households (23.9%) were made up of individuals, and 1,665 (6.7%) had someone living alone who was 65 years of age or older. The average household size was 2.55. There were 11,925 families (47.9% of all households); the average family size was 2.97.

The population age and sex distribution was 10,760 people (16.4%) under the age of 18, 21,757 people (33.2%) aged 18 to 24, 14,823 people (22.6%) aged 25 to 44, 12,685 people (19.3%) aged 45 to 64, and 5,597 people (8.5%) who were 65 years of age or older. The median age was 25.2 years. For every 100 females, there were 90.5 males. For every 100 females age 18 and over, there were 88.0 males.

There were 25,869 housing units, with an average density of 2,608.0 per square mile (1,007.0/km^{2}), of which 10,699 (43.0%) were owner-occupied, and 14,174 (57.0%) were occupied by renters. The homeowner vacancy rate was 0.9%; the rental vacancy rate was 3.5%. 27,594 people (42.0% of the population) lived in owner-occupied housing units and 35,928 people (54.7%) lived in rental housing units.

This city of approximately 65,000 people abuts a university campus of 32,000 students. Although the university's land is not incorporated within the city, many students live off-campus in the city.

== Economy ==
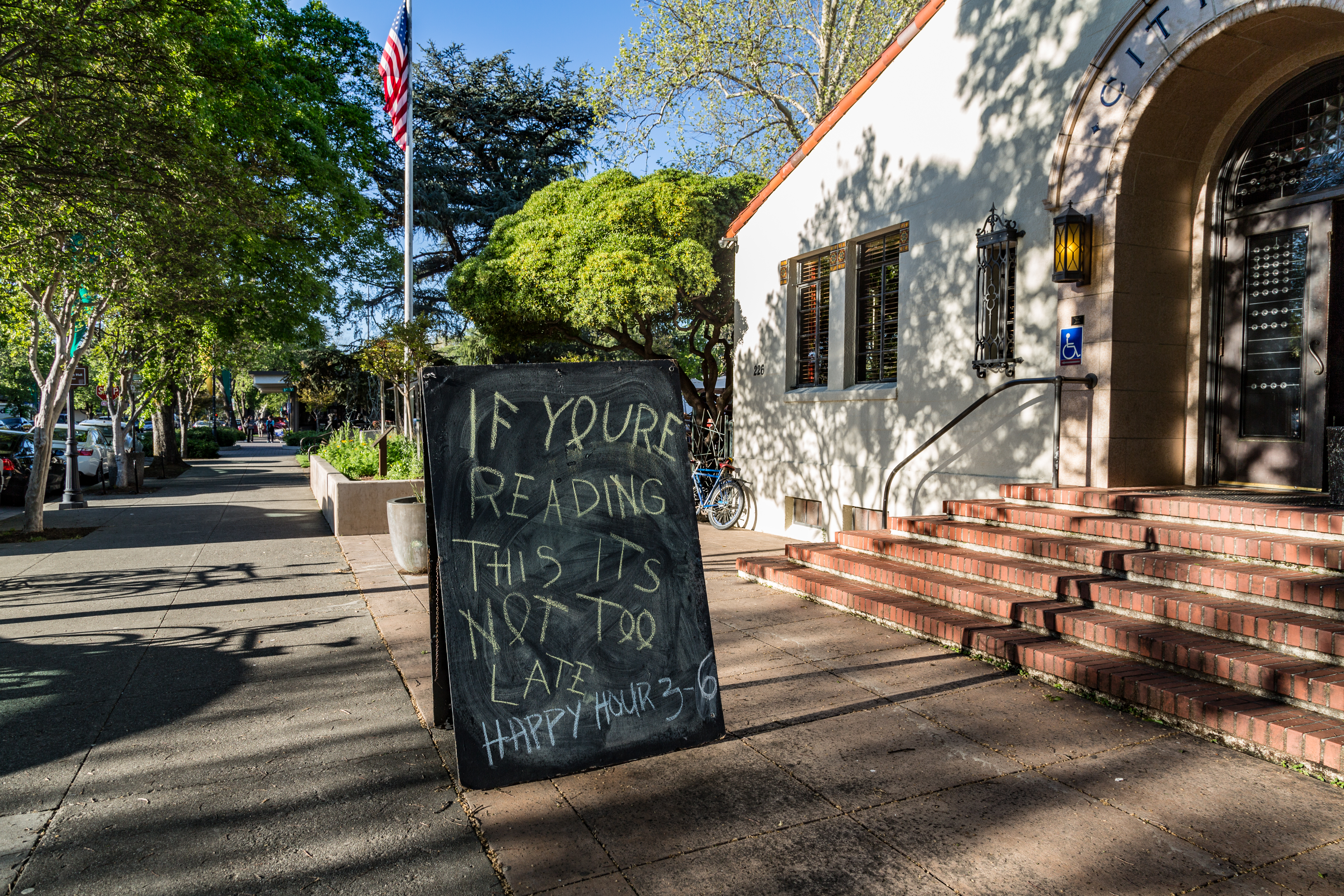
Old City Hall

=== Top employers ===
According to the city's 2020 Comprehensive Annual Financial Report, the top employers in the city are:

#	Employer	# of Employees
1	University of California, Davis	25,227
2	Davis Joint Unified School District	1,120
3	Sutter Health	505
4	City of Davis	341 (FTEs)
5	Nugget Markets	265
6	Unitrans	260
7	Safeway	188
8	Courtyard Healthcare Center	162
9	University Retirement Community	160
10	Davis Food Co-op	117

== Arts and culture ==
Festivals include:

- Whole Earth Festival, featuring bands, speakers and workshops.
- Celebrate Davis, features music, food vendors, animals, rock climbing, zip-lining, and fireworks.
- Picnic Day, an annual event at University of California, Davis, is the largest student-run event in the United States, features a parade, the UC Davis Marching Band, and Dachshund races.
- Davis Transmedia Art Walk, a public art tour.

Cultural attractions at UC Davis include:

- Manetti Shrem Museum of Art, which has featured art by Wayne Thiebaud, Bruce Nauman, John Cage, and Robert Arneson.
- Mondavi Center, has featured Yo-Yo Ma, Yitzhak Perlman and Wynton Marsalis.
- UC Davis Arboretum.
- The Domes (Baggins End Innovative Housing), an on-campus cooperative housing community.

== Parks and recreation ==
=== Bicycling ===
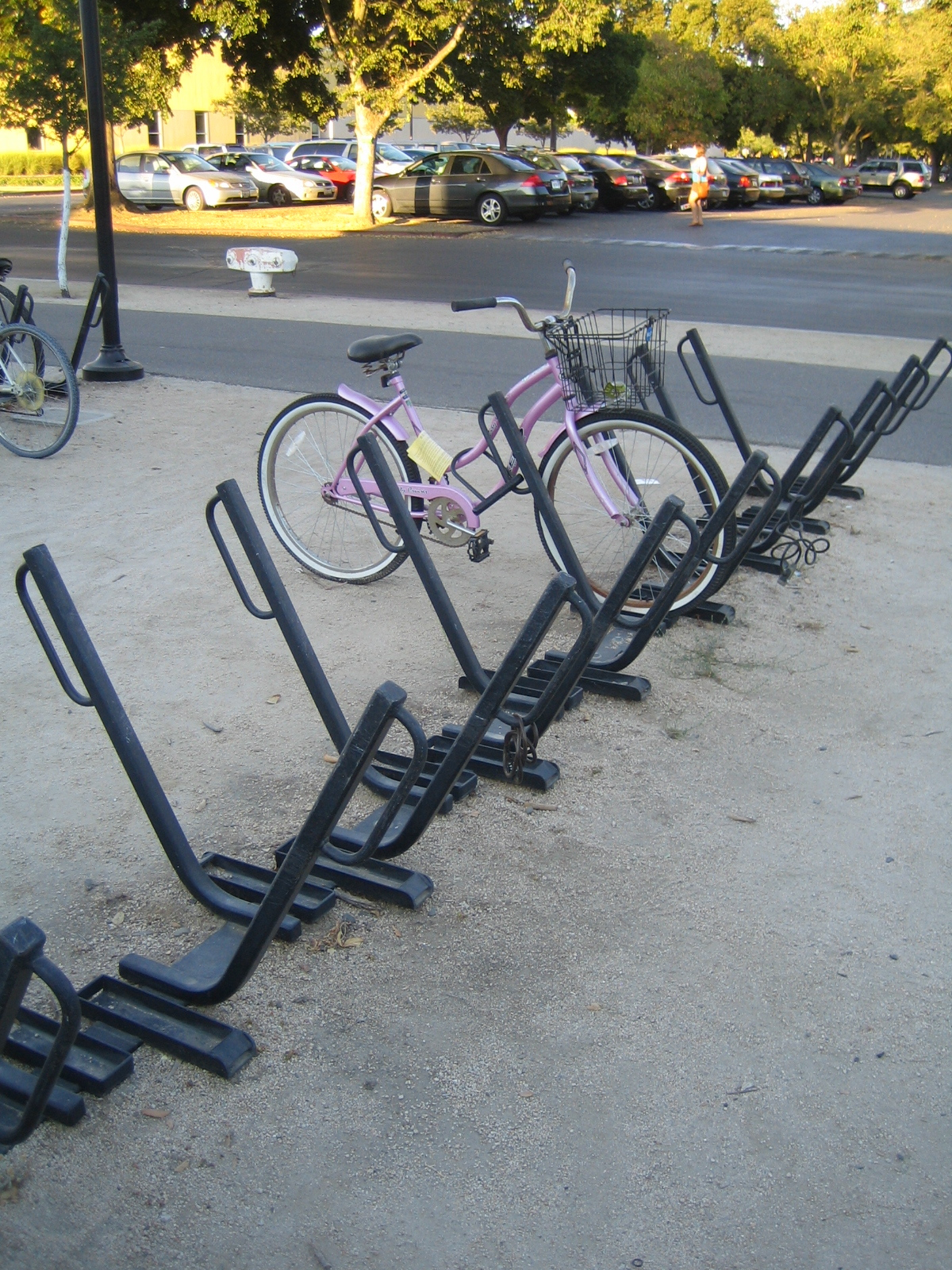
Bike racks in Davis

Bicycling has been one of the most popular modes of transportation in Davis for decades, particularly among school-age children and UC Davis students. In 2010, Davis became the new home of the United States Bicycling Hall of Fame.

Bicycle infrastructure became a political issue in the 1960s, culminating in the election of a pro-bicycle majority to the City Council in 1966. By the early 1970s, Davis had become a pioneer in the implementation of cycling facilities. As the city expands, new facilities are usually mandated. As a result, Davis residents today enjoy an extensive network of bike lanes, bike paths, and grade-separated bicycle crossings. The flat terrain and temperate climate are also conducive to bicycling.

Bicycling appears to be declining among Davis residents: from 1990 to 2000, the US Census Bureau reported a decline in the fraction of commuters traveling by bicycle, from 22 percent to 15 percent. This resulted in the reestablishment of the city's Bicycle Advisory Commission and creation of advocate groups such as "Davis Bicycles!". In 2016, Fifth Street, a main road in Davis, was converted from four lanes to two lanes to allow for bicycle lanes and encourage more bicycling.

In 1996, 2001, 2006, and 2009, the UC Davis "Cal Aggie Cycling" Team won the national road cycling competition.

== Education ==
=== University of California ===
The University of California, Davis, or UC Davis, a campus of the University of California, had a 2019 Fall enrollment of 38,369 students. UC Davis has a dominant influence on the social and cultural life of the town.

=== Other colleges ===
An off-campus branch of Sacramento City College is located in Davis. The satellite is located in West Village, an area built by UC Davis to house students and others affiliated with the university.

=== Public schools ===
Davis's public school system is administrated by the Davis Joint Unified School District.

The city has nine public elementary schools (North Davis, Birch Lane, Pioneer Elementary, Patwin, Cesar Chavez, Robert E. Willett, Marguerite Montgomery, Fred T. Korematsu at Mace Ranch, and Fairfield Elementary (which is outside the city limits but opened in 1866 and is Davis Joint Unified School District's oldest public school)). Davis has one school for independent study (Davis School for Independent Study), four public junior high schools (Ralph Waldo Emerson, Oliver Wendell Holmes, Frances Harper, and Leonardo da Vinci Junior High), one main high school (Davis Senior High School), one alternative high school (Martin Luther King High School), and a small project based high school (Leonardo da Vinci High School). Cesar Chavez is a Spanish immersion school, with no English integration until the third grade. The junior high schools contain grades 7 through 9. Due to a decline in the school-age population in Davis, two of the elementary schools in south Davis may have their district boundaries changed, or magnet programs may be moved to equalize enrollment. Valley Oak was closed after the 2007–08 school year, and their campus was granted to Da Vinci High (which had formerly been located in the back of Davis Senior High's campus) and a special-ed preschool. On average, class size is about 25 students for every teacher.

At one time, Chavez and Willett were incorporated together to provide elementary education K–6 to both English-speaking and Spanish immersion students in West Davis. César Chávez served grades K–3 and was called West Davis Elementary, and Robert E. Willett (named for a long-time teacher at the school, now deceased) served grades 4–6 and was known as West Davis Intermediate. Willett now serves K–6 English-speaking students, and Chavez supports the Spanish immersion program for K–6.

=== Private schools ===
- Davis Waldorf School (Pre-K–8)
- Peregrine School (Pre-K–6)
- St James Catholic School (Pre-K-12)

== Media ==
Davis has one newspaper, The Davis Enterprise, a thrice-weekly newspaper founded in 1897. UC Davis also has a weekly newspaper called The California Aggie that covers campus, local and national news. Davis Media Access, a community media center, is the umbrella organization of television station DCTV. There are also numerous commercial stations broadcasting from nearby Sacramento. Davis has two community radio stations: KDVS 90.3 FM, on the University of California campus, and KDRT 95.7 FM, a subsidiary of Davis Media Access and one of the first low-power FM radio stations in the United States. Davis has the world's largest English-language local wiki, DavisWiki. In 2006, The People's Vanguard of Davis began news reporting about the city of Davis, the Davis Joint Unified School District, the county of Yolo, and the Sacramento area.

== Notable people ==
These are some notable Davis residents, other than UC Davis faculty who were not previously from Davis.

- Jalil Anibaba, soccer player and club ambassador for Nashville SC
- Max Arfsten, USA soccer player
- Karin Argoud, actress
- David Breaux, activist and author
- Samuel G. Armistead, anthropologist and linguist
- Ruth Asmundson, former mayor of Davis
- Peter S. Beagle, author, The Last Unicorn
- Eric Beavers, American football quarterback
- Robert F. Berkhofer, historian
- Nate Boyden, soccer player
- William G. Burrill, Episcopal bishop
- Cathy Carr, American Olympic swimmer
- Robert Todd Carroll (born 1945), publisher of The Skeptic's Dictionary and fellow for Committee for Skeptical Inquiry
- Alexandra Chalupa, American pro-Ukrainian activist
- Connie Chan, San Francisco politician
- Joseph Ballinger Chiles, trail blazer and early pioneer
- Tony Cline Jr., NFL tight end
- Antoinette Clinton, aka Butterscotch, musician
- Kim Conley, 2012 Olympian, track and field
- Ross Cordy, archaeologist
- Joe Craven, musician
- Denise Curry, basketball player
- Jerome C. Davis, state figure and pioneer, and namesake of Davis
- Malachi Davis, sprinter, Olympian
- Josh Davis, aka DJ Shadow, famous for his critically acclaimed sample based instrumental hip-hop
- Cecilia Dean, fashion model and entrepreneur
- Theodosius Dobzhansky, Russian-American geneticist and evolutionary biologist
- Maya Doms, professional soccer player
- Delaine Eastin, former California State Superintendent of Public Instruction
- Tony Fields, actor, dancer; Davis High School alumnus. Fields is best known in his tenure as a Solid Gold Dancer (1979–1984) and his film roles of Alan DeLuca in the 1985 movie version of A Chorus Line and Sammi Curr in the 1986 cult horror film Trick Or Treat.
- Jason Fisk, former NFL defensive tackle
- Karen Joy Fowler, author
- Rebecca Fransway, author and poet
- Michael Franti, musician
- Nick Frentz, politician, member of the Minnesota Senate
- Todd Gogulski, former professional bicycle road racer and TV commentator for Universal Sports
- John Lawrence Goheen, American missionary, educator and administrator, agriculturist, social worker, and writer
- Carol Greider, molecular biologist and Nobel Laureate (at Johns Hopkins), raised in Davis
- Myril Hoag, MLB outfielder, three-time World Series champion
- Rita Hosking, musician
- Winnifred Hudson, painter
- Nyjah Huston, professional skateboarder
- Nabi Kibunguchy, soccer player
- Katie Kitamura, author
- John Lescroart, author
- John Lieswyn, American racing cyclist
- Ladule Lako LoSarah is an American-born South Sudanese international footballer currently with FC Inter Leipzig of the German NOFV-Oberliga.
- Deborah Madison, chef, author
- Daniel William Marsh, convicted felon
- Mike May, entrepreneur and athlete, regained sight after decades of complete blindness
- Jonna Mazet, epidemiologist
- Barry Melton, musician
- Gina Miles, 2008 Beijing Olympic silver medalist, equestrian
- Scott Miller, pop musician
- Hasan Minhaj, comedian
- Jennifer Moffitt, politician
- Paul Moller, engineer and developer of the Moller Skycar
- Rachel Moore, president and CEO of the Los Angeles Music Center
- Freddie Muller, Major League Baseball infielder
- Dave Nachmanoff, musician
- Gabe Newell, co-founder of Valve
- Iyabo Obasanjo, Nigerian politician
- Fiona O'Keeffe, long-distance runner and marathon runner in the 2024 Paris Olympics
- Thretton Palamo, American rugby union player
- Ning Pan, engineer
- Dickie Peterson, musician
- Orange Phelps, Oregon businessman and politician
- Kim Stanley Robinson, science-fiction author; famous works include Mars trilogy.
- Stephen Robinson, astronaut (received bachelor's degree from UC Davis, 1978)
- Beth Rodden, professional rock climber
- Halsey Rodman, artist
- Ray Rohwer, Major League Baseball outfielder
- Ed Ross, tintype photographer and lawyer
- Paul Scheuring, screenwriter (Prison Break, A Man Apart)
- Dave Scott, triathlete, six-time Ironman Triathlon world champion
- Jonathan Segel, American composer and multi-instrumentalist
- Meredith Small, anthropologist
- Peter Siebold, member of the Scaled Composites astronaut team
- Colby Slater, American rugby union player, Olympic gold-medal winner
- Sean Stewart, author
- Charles Tart, parapsychologist
- Donnette Thayer, vocalist, guitarist and songwriter
- Helen Thomson, state and county politician
- Alexandria Villaseñor, climate activist
- Nick Watney, PGA Tour professional golfer
- Zach Weiner, web comic author and illustrator
- Andy Weir, author of The Martian
- Paul Whaley, drummer for the band Blue Cheer
- Craig Wilson, water polo player and Olympian
- Mike Wise, NFL defensive end
- Lois Wolk, state politician
- Paul Wulff, former Washington State football head coach
- Steve Wynn, musician, leader of the band The Dream Syndicate
- Mariko Yamada, state politician
- Martin Yan, cooking show host
- Sophia Yin, veterinarian, animal trainer and author
- Gary Lee Yoder, musician, part of several 1960s psychedelic rock bands
- Malcolm Clemens Young, Episcopal priest, dean of Grace Cathedral, San Francisco
- Robert Zirkin, Maryland politician

== Sister cities ==
Davis's sister cities are:

- Huishan (Wuxi), China
- Inuyama, Japan
- Los Baños, Philippines
- Muñoz, Philippines
- Qufu, China
- Rutilio Grande, El Salvador
- Sangju, South Korea
- Uman, Ukraine

== See also ==
- Davis Community Church, 1800s structure, congregation
- Lake Davis, California
