= 2011 Nigerian Senate elections in Ogun State =

2011 Nigerian Senate election in Ogun State

The 2011 Nigerian Senate election in Ogun State was held on April 9, 2011, to elect members of the Nigerian Senate to represent Ogun State. Olugbenga Onaolapo Obadara representing Ogun Central, Sefiu Adegbenga Kaka representing Ogun East and Akin Babalola Kamar Odunsi representing Ogun West all won on the platform of Action Congress of Nigeria.

== Overview ==
Affiliation	Party		Total
Affiliation	ACN	PDP	Total
Before Election			3
After Election	3	–	3

== Summary ==
District	Incumbent	Party	Elected Senator	Party
Ogun Central			Olugbenga Onaolapo Obadara	ACN
Ogun East			Sefiu Adegbenga Kaka	ACN
Ogun West			Akin Babalola Kamar Odunsi	ACN

== Results ==
=== Ogun Central ===
Action Congress of Nigeria candidate Olugbenga Onaolapo Obadara won the election, defeating other party candidates.

2011 Nigerian Senate election in Ogun State
Party	Candidate	Votes	%
Action Congress of Nigeria	Olugbenga Onaolapo Obadara		
Total votes			
ACN hold			

=== Ogun East ===
Action Congress of Nigeria candidate Sefiu Adegbenga Kaka won the election, defeating other party candidates.

2011 Nigerian Senate election in Ogun State
Party	Candidate	Votes	%
ACN	Sefiu Adegbenga Kaka		
Total votes			
ACN hold			

=== Ogun West ===
Action Congress of Nigeria candidate Akin Babalola Kamar Odunsi won the election, defeating party candidates.

2011 Nigerian Senate election in Ogun State
Party	Candidate	Votes	%
ACN	Akin Babalola Kamar Odunsi		
Total votes			
ACN hold			
