= DWS =

DWS can refer to:

- Dallas Wind Symphony, a professional concert band
- Dancing with the Stars, international reality TV franchise
- Dandy–Walker syndrome, a congenital brain malformation
- Data Warehouse System Electronic Surveillance Data Management System, an electronic FBI database
- Davis Waldorf School, a private Waldorf school located in Davis, California
- Debbie Wasserman Schultz, American politician, former chairperson of Democratic National Committee, member of the U.S. House of Representatives from Florida
- The Decline of Western Civilization, 1981 American documentary
- Deep-water soloing, a style of climbing
- Denton Wilde Sapte, an international law firm
- Dictionary writing system
- Diffusing-wave spectroscopy, a physics method for solutions
- Diplomatic wireless service
- Door Wilskracht Sterk, a Dutch football club
- Drinking water standard
- dws, 639-3 code for the Dutton Speedwords
- .dws, a drawing standard file for AutoCAD
- DWS Group, German asset management company
- Dynamic WAN Selection, a computer network routing technology
