= Felix Kolawole Bajomo =

Nigerian politician and accountant (born 1947)

Senator for Ogun West
- In office 5 June 2007 – 6 June 2011
- Succeeded by: Akin Babalola Kamar Odunsi

Personal details
- Born: 7 January 1947 (age 79)
- Party: Peoples Democratic Party
- Occupation: Politician; accountant

Felix Kolawole Bajomo (born 7 January 1947) is a Nigerian accountant and politician who was elected a member of the Senate for the Ogun West constituency of Ogun State in April 2007.

== Background ==
Felix Kolawole Bajomo was born on 7 January 1947. He is a fellow of the Association of Cost and Management Accountants (ACMA) and associate member of the Association of Chartered Stockbrokers (ACS). Before entering politics, he was managing director, Commercial Trust Bank; Executive Director, Union Bank; Executive Director, Savannah Bank, and Chairman of the Federal Housing Authority (2005–2006). He was at one time Chairman of Gateway Hotels. He also held the position of President of the Institute of Chartered Accountants of Nigeria (ICAN).

In 2003, Bajomo ran as the Alliance for Democracy candidate for the Ogun West senate seat, but was defeated by Iyabo Anisulowo, former Minister of State for Education between 1995 and 1998 under the Sanni Abacha administration. In January 2005, Bajomo switched to the People's Democratic Party (PDP).

== Senate career ==
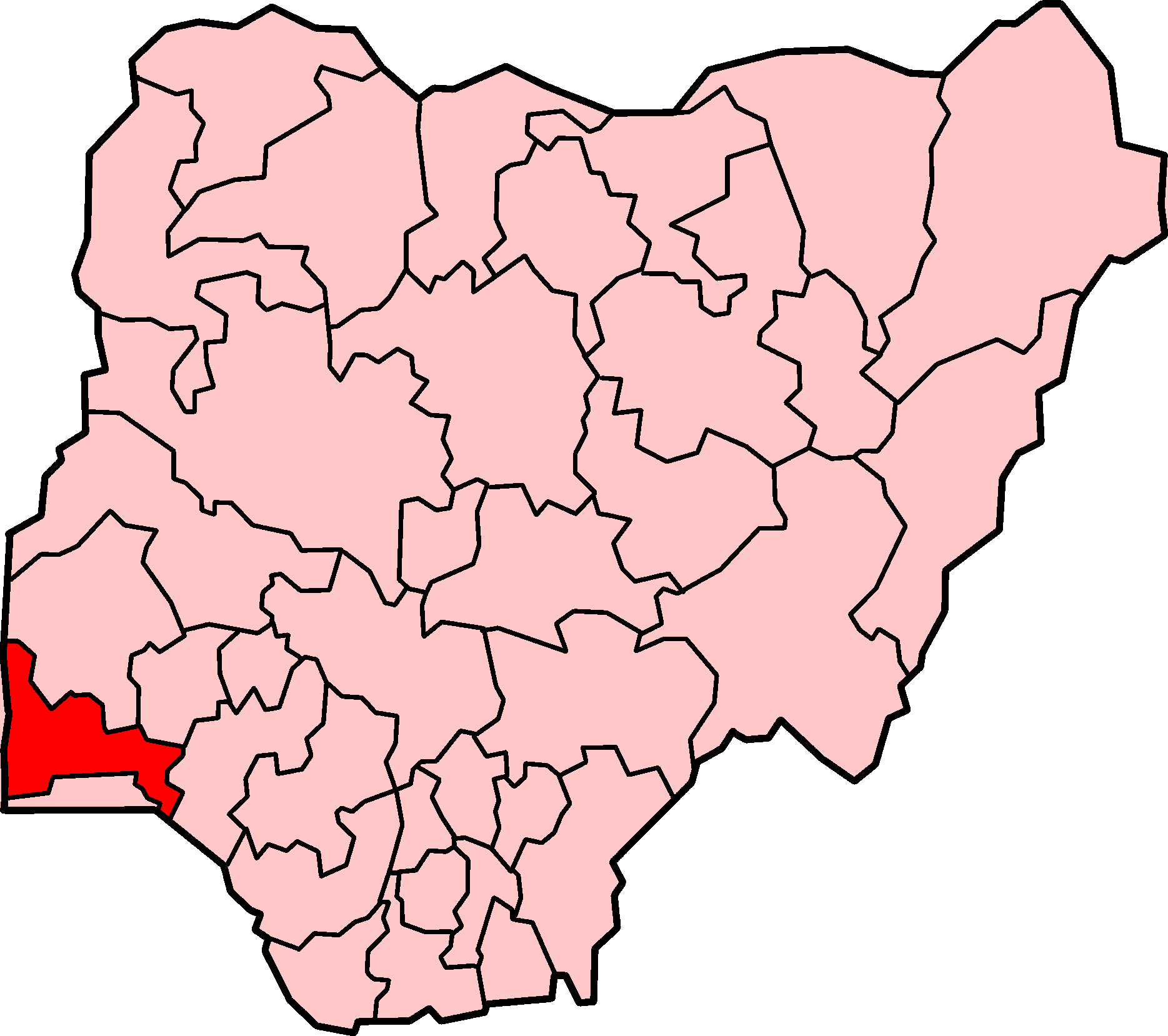
Ogun State, Nigeria

In April 2007, he ran for the Senate on the PDP ticket and was elected for the Ogun West constituency. He was appointed to committees on Privatization, Foreign Affairs, Finance, Establishment & Public Service, Banking, Insurance & Other Financial Institutions and Appropriation.

In March 2009, he was involved in a scrap between Ogun State Governor Gbenga Daniel and Ogun senators Iyabo Obasanjo-Bello and Lekan Mustapha.

The dispute dragged on into July, with Yoruba Elders backing Governor Daniel while four representatives and the two senators remained in opposition and failing to attend a meeting when president Yar'Adua visited the state.

In May 2009, Bajomo was among ten senators who made a controversial all-expenses-paid trip to Ghana, where they were rumoured to have been influenced by oil companies at a seminar on the Petroleum Industry Bill. The Senate ordered a full investigation into the matter by its Ethics, Code of Conduct and Public Petitions Committee.

However, there were delays in issuing the committee report.

In September 2009, he called for the Ministry of Finance, the Central Bank of Nigeria (CBN) and other economic experts to inject money into the economy. Speaking about initial public offerings (IPOs) before the recent financial crisis, where many people paid inflated prices, he said that the Securities and Exchange Commission should have dealt with those responsible, but not the Economic and Financial Crimes Commission unless there was clear evidence of fraud.

Earlier he had stated that the N420 billion used by the CBN to bail out five banks did not require appropriation by the National Assembly.
