= Lanre Tejuosho =

Nigerian politician

Omoba Lanre Tejuoso
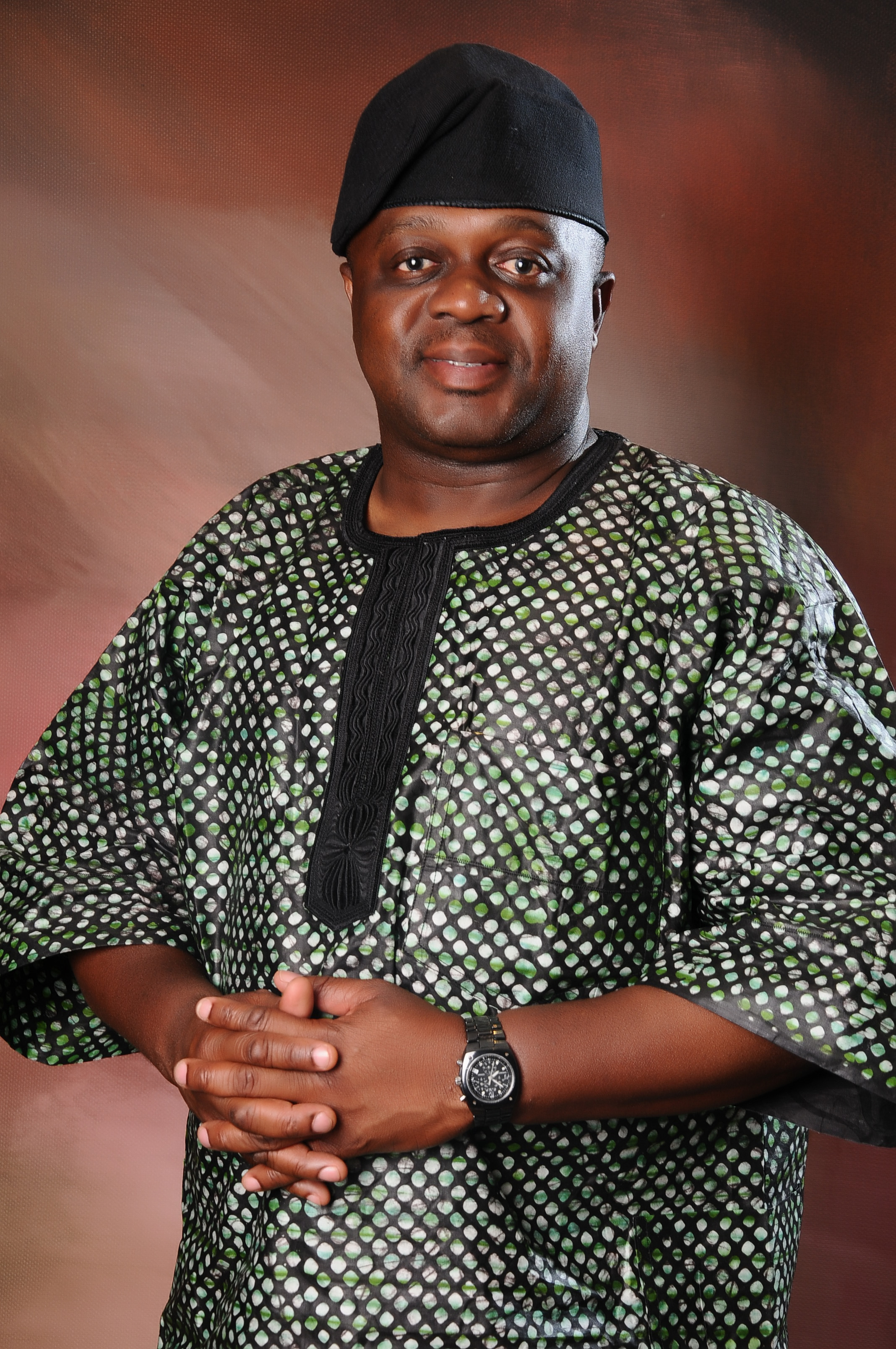
- Tejuoso in 2014

Senator for Ogun Central
- In office 6 June 2015 – 2019 Serving with Buruji Kashamu and Joseph Gbolahan Dada
- Preceded by: Olugbenga Onaolapo Obadara
- Succeeded by: Ibikunle Amosun

Chairman of the Senate Committee on Health
- In office 17 September 2015 – April 2019

Personal details
- Born: Adeyemi Olanrewaju Tejuoso; 1964 (age 61–62) Abeokuta, Ogun, Nigeria
- Party: All Progressives Congress
- Spouse: Oloori Moji Tejuosho (née Okoya)
- Relations: Oba Dr. Adedapo Tejuoso (father); Oloori Adetoun Tejuoso (mother); Iyaloye Bisoye Tejuoso (grandmother); Oloori Funmi Tejuosho (sister-in-law)
- Education: University of Lagos (MBBS)
- Profession: Medical Doctor politician
- Awards: Grammarian of Honour; Paul Harris Fellow (Rotary)

Olanrewaju Adeyemi Tejuoso (born 1964) is a Nigerian medical doctor and politician who served as a senator representing Ogun Central in the 8th National Assembly from 2015 to 2019.

== Background ==
Tejuoso was born in Abeokuta as a prince of the dynasty of HRM Oba Dr. Adedapo Tejuoso, CON, Karunwi III, Oranmiyan, the Osile of Oke-Ona Egba, and Olori Adetoun Tejuoso. As the son of the Oba, he is also the grand son of one of the first female industrialists in Nigeria, Iyaloye Bisoye Tejuoso, the Iyalode of Egbaland.

He represented Ogun Central in the 8th National Assembly where he was the chairman, Senate Committee on Health.

Tejuoso is a member of the All Progressives Congress (APC). He was the chairman of the National Convention Committee of Congress for Progressive Change (CPC) party in 2011 that led to the emergence of General Muhammadu Buhari as the presidential flag bearer of Congress for Progressive Change (CPC) before it was merged to form All Progressive Congress (APC). He has also served as the Commissioner for Youths and Sports, Environment Ministry and Special Duties under the governorship of Senator Ibikunle Amosun.

== Early life and education ==
Tejuoso started his elementary education at the University of Lagos Staff School in 1967 and was later at Igbobi College, Lagos, in 1974 for his secondary education. In 1981, he was admitted into the University of Lagos, where he obtained his MBBS and later accomplished his specialties in telemedicine and medical computing abroad. He became a medical doctor at the age of 21, making him one of the youngest doctors in Nigeria.

== Public service and private enterprise ==
Tejuoso completed his national youth service at the Nigerian Ports Authority Medical Hospital, where he participated in the National Youth Service Corps (NYSC) scheme. After his service year, he had a brief stint at Teju Hospital, now Iyaode Bisoye Tejuoso Hospital, where he practiced as a medical officer.

Tejuoso served on the boards of many blue-chip companies, including Berger Paints Nigeria PLC, Custodian and Allied Insurance, Teju Industries Ltd, Iyalode Bisoye Tejuoso Hospital and Adonai Petroleum. He is the founder of Avicenna International School and Buckswood School. He was also the president of Rotary Club of Tejuoso, Surulere, Lagos, from 1990 to 1991 and was the chairman of Lagos Badminton Association between 1993 and 1994. He founded a non-governmental organisation, the Iyalode Bisoye Tejuoso Malaria Foundation, to give medical assistance to the masses for free.

== Political campaign and governance ==
Tejuoso joined Ogun politics in 2007 when he made an attempt to represent the Ogun Central Senatorial District on the platform of All Nigeria Peoples Party (ANPP) in the Senate during the tenure of Chief Olusegun Obasanjo as president but lost out to Iyabo Obasanjo-Bello. He remained determined despite several assassination attempts.

At the formation of the Congress for Progressive Change (CPC) in 2010, he emerged a strong force to reckon with in the party in Ogun State and was made the chairman of the National Convention Committee of Congress for Progressive Change (CPC) party in 2011 that led to the emergence of General Muhammadu Buhari as the party flag bearer, he raised the hand of Muhammadu Buhari as the presidential candidate of the party in the 2011 presidential election, at the party's national convention at the Eagle Square in Abuja.

He later joined the then Action Congress of Nigeria (ACN) that teamed up with Congress for Progressive Change CPC, All Nigeria Peoples Party (ANPP) and a faction of the All Progressives Grand Alliance (APGA) to form the All Peoples Congress.

Tejuoso had, prior to his election as a senator, served the people of Ogun State as commissioner in the administration of Governor Ibikunle Amosun, handling three different portfolios of Youth and Sports, Environment and Special Duties. As a commissioner, he is credited with achieving distribution of 500 electricity transformers to all parts of the state; management of a seven megawatt power plant; modernisation of the June 12 Cultural Centre; introduction of solar power to rural areas; upgrading of the major dam that provides water to residents of Abeokuta; introduction of special marshals for environment and modernisation of the MKO Abiola Stadium.

== Senator of the Federal Republic of Nigeria ==
Tejuoso was elected to the Senate of the Federal Republic of Nigeria as the All Progressive Congress (APC) candidate from Ogun Central in April 2015.

In 2021, President Buhari appointed Tejuoso as the pro-chancellor of the University of Lagos.

== Personal life ==
Tejuoso is married to Oloori Moji Tejuoso (née Okoya). The Oloori is one of the daughters of the renowned Nigerian businessman, Chief Razaq Okoya. She is a philanthropist and socialite. They are blessed with children and grandchildren.
