= Funmi =

- Gender: Female
- Language: Yoruba

Origin
- Meaning: give me, for me

Other names
- Variant forms: Funmilayo; Funmilola
- Related names: Olufunmilayo/Oluwafunmilayo; Olufunmilola/Oluwafunmilola

Funmi audio is a feminine given name meaning "for me" or "give me" in Yoruba. It is a diminutive version of names such as:

- "Olufunmilola/Oluwafunmilola" (God has given me wealth) or "Funmilola" (give me wealth)
- "Olufunmilayo/Oluwafunmilayo" (God has given me joy) or "Funmilayo" (give me joy).

== Notable people with the name include ==
- Funmilayo Ransome-Kuti (born 1900, died 1978), Nigerian educator, politician and women's rights activist
- Funmilayo Olayinka (born 1960, died 2013), Nigerian banker and politician
- Oluwafunmilayo Olajumoke Atilade (born 1952), Nigerian jurist
- Funmilayo Olopade (born 1957, Nigerian American physician
- Funmi Aragbaye (born 1954), Nigerian gospel singer, songwriter and televangelist
- Funmi Falana, Nigerian legal practitioner and women's rights activist
- Funmi Fadoju (born 2002), English netball player
- Funmi Iyanda (born 1971), Nigerian talk show host, broadcaster, journalist, and blogger
- Funmi Jimoh (born 1984), American long jumper
- Funmi Olonisakin, British-Nigerian scholar
- Funmi Tejuosho (born 1965), Nigerian politician
- Olajumoke Olufunmilola Adenowo (born, 1968), Nigerian architect
- Rachel Akosua Funmilola Garton (born 1991), Nigerian singer.
