= Onaolapo =

Onaolapo is a given name and surname. Notable people with the name include:

- Joy Onaolapo (c.1983–2013), Nigerian Paralympic weightlifter
- Onaolapo Soleye (1933–2023), Nigerian scholar, government minister
- Olugbenga Onaolapo Obadara, (born 1960), Nigerian politician and Senator
