= List of LocalWikis =

LocalWiki is a collaborative project that aims to collect and open the world's local knowledge. This list of locations which have LocalWikis dedicated to them is necessarily incomplete.

Location	Country	Link	Founded	Active (Note: Active in the last twelve months, Yes/No - Month/Year checked)	Pages
Abingdon, Virginia	(United States)	abingdon	2012	No - April 2021	40
Adelaide Hills, South Australia	(Australia)	adelaide-hills	2012	Yes - April 2021	1,266
Akron, Ohio	(United States)	akron	2010	No - April 2021	299
Alamance County, North Carolina	(United States)	alamance	2012	Yes - April 2021	639
Alameda, California	(United States)	alameda	2009	Yes - April 2021	164
Ann Arbor, Michigan	(United States)	ann-arbor	2006	Yes - April 2021	13,260
Arlington Heights, Illinois	(United States)	arlington-heights	2012	Yes - April 2021	747
Arlington, Virginia	(United States)	arlva	2013	No - April 2021	12
Aroostook County, Maine	(United States)	aroostook	2013	No - April 2021	36
Athens, Georgia	(United States)	athens	2008	No - April 2021	58
Atlanta	(United States)	atl	2013	No - April 20211	21
Baton Rouge, Louisiana	(United States)	baton-rouge	2007	No - April 2021	212
Belize	(Belize)	belize	2014	No - April 2021)	13
Berkeley, California	(United States)	berkeley	2007	Yes - April 2021)	338
Bloomington–Normal, Illinois	(United States)	bloomington-normal	2009	Yes - April 2021)	1,396
Boise, Idaho	(United States)	boise	2011	Yes - April 2021)	554
Boston	(United States)	boston	2013	Yes - April 2021	27
Buffalo, New York	(United States)	buffalo	2008	Yes - April 2021	1015
Burns, Oregon	(United States)	burns	2013	No - April 2021	68
Caguas, Puerto Rico	(Puerto Rico)	caguas	2013	No - April 2021	10
Camarillo, California	(United States)	camarillo	2008	No - April 2021	243
Canton, Michigan	(United States)	canton	2009	Yes - April 2021	1196
Cary, North Carolina	(United States)	cary	2011	No - April 2021	77
Champaign–Urbana, Illinois	(United States)	cu	2012	Yes - April 2021	1,855
Chappaqua, New York	(United States)	chappaqua	2013	No - April 2021	22
Charlotte, North Carolina	(United States)	charlotte	2013	No - April 2021	96
Chattanooga, Tennessee	(United States)	cha	2013	Yes - April 2021	356
Chicago	(United States)	chicago	2013	No - April 2021	288
Chico, California	(United States)	chico	2006	Yes - April 2021	3,010
Clarksville, Tennessee	(United States)	clarksville	2014	No - April 2021	58
Cleveland	(United States)	cleveland	2013	No - April 2021	185
Columbia, South Carolina	(United States)	columbia	2019	No - April 2021	40
Concord, California	(United States)	concord	2013	Yes - April 2021	54
Conway, Arkansas	(United States)	conway	2011	No - April 2021	465
Copenhagen	(Denmark)	cph	2014	No - April 2021	20
Corvallis, Oregon	(United States)	corvallis	2007	No - April 2021	125
Davis, California	(United States)	davis	2004	Yes - April 2021	17,174
Dayton, Ohio	(United States)	dayton	2014	No - April 2021	10
Denton, Texas	(United States)	denton	2010	Yes - April 2021	1,227
Denver	(United States)	denver	2013	No - April 2021	29
Detroit	(United States)	detroit	2009	Yes - April 20210	1,269
Dixon, California	(United States)	dixon	2008	Yes - April 2021	134
Duisburg	(Germany)	du	2013	No - April 2021	82
Dún Laoghaire	(Republic of Ireland)	dl	2013	Yes - April 2021	305
Durham, North Carolina	(United States)	durham	2012	No - April 2021	29
Elk Grove, California	(United States)	elk-grove	2008	No - April 2021	97
Eugene, Oregon	(United States)	eugene	2010	No - April 2021	134
Eureka, California	(United States)	eureka	2013	No - April 2021	72
Fort Lauderdale, Florida	(United States)	ftl	2013	Yes - April 2021	243
Fredericksburg, Virginia	(United States)	fredericksburg	2010	No - April 2021	142
Fremont, California	(United States)	fremont	2013	Yes - April 2021	44
Gainesville, Florida	(United States)	gainesville	2013	No - April 2021	31
Grand Rapids, Michigan	(United States)	gr	2007	Yes - April 2021	2,477
Greater New Bedford, Massachusetts	(United States)	grnb	2013	No - April 2021	10
Haiti	(Haiti)	haiti	2014	No - April 2021	11
Hampton Roads, Virginia	(United States)	hrva	2013	Yes - April 2021	306
Hawaiʻi Island	(United States)	hawaii	2013	No - April 2021	39 -
Hayward, California	(United States)	hayward	2014	No - April 2021	51
Hirakata	(Japan)	Hirakata	2015	Yes - April 2021	1746
Hiroshima	(Japan)	Hiroshima	2015	No - April 2021	16
Historic Rock Island, Quebec	(Canada)	rock-island	2009	No - April 2021	868
Historic Saranac Lake, New York	(United States)	hsl	2009	Yes - April 2021	7,373
Honolulu	(United States)	honolulu	2013	No - April 2021	10
Houston	(United States)	houston	2014	No - April 2021	22
Hudson Valley, New York	(United States)	hudsonvalley	2013	No - April 2021	12
Humboldt County, California	(United States)	humboldt	2013	No - April 2021	23
Imperial Beach, California	(United States)	ib	2013	No - April 2021	36
Institut Henri Poincaré in Paris	(France)	ihp	2013	No - April 2021	14
Ithaca, New York	(United States)	ithaca	2008	Yes - April 2021	841
Jakarta	(Indonesia)	jkt	2013	No - April 2021	21
Japan	(Japan)	main-ja	2013	Yes - April 2021	1,213
King's Lynn	(United Kingdom)	kings-lynn	2013	No - April 2021	148
Kitchener, Ontario	(Canada)	kitchener	2013	Yes - April 2021	420
Liverpool	(United Kingdom)	liverpool	2009	Yes - April 2021	296
Lompoc, California	(United States)	lompoc	2008	No - April 2021	115
Los Angeles Metro	(United States)	la	2013	Yes - April 2021	196
Madison, Wisconsin	(United States)	madisonwi	2014	No - April 2021	17
Marquette County, Michigan	(United States)	marquettemi	2013	Yes - April 2021	299
Menomonie, Wisconsin	(United States)	menomonie	2016	Yes - April 20219	413
Miami	(United States)	miami	2012	Yes - April 2021	445
Mississauga, Ontario	(Canada)	mississauga	2007	Yes - April 2021	3,823
Montréal	(Canada)	mtl	2013	No - April 2021	27
Nevada County, California	(United States)	nevada-county	2011	Yes - April 2021	204
New York City	(United States)	nyc	2013	Yes - April 2021	48
Norwalk, Connecticut	(United States)	norwalk	2009	No - April 2021	362
Oakland, California	(United States)	oakland	2012	Yes - April 2021	8,619
Olympia, Washington	(United States)	oly	2011	Yes - April 2021	299
Orland, California	(United States)	or	2013	No - April 2021	18
Orting, Washington	(United States)	orting	2013	No - April 2021	45
Palangkaraya	(Indonesia)	pky	2014	No - April 2021	18
Pawtucket, Rhode Island	(United States)	pawtucket	2009	No - April 2021	83
Peterborough, Ontario	(Canada)	ptbo	2010	No - April 2021	193
Philomath, Oregon	(United States)	philomath	2007	No - April 2021	271
Pittsburgh	(United States)	pgh	2014	Yes - April 2021	18
Portland, Oregon	(United States)	pdx	2013	Yes - April 2021	166
Prince Edward Island	(Canada)	pei	2008	Yes - April 2021	322
Provo, Utah	(United States)	provo	2008	No - April 2021	193
Raleigh, North Carolina	(United States)	raleigh	2011	Yes - April 2021	1,864
Redding, California	(United States)	redding	2007	No - April 2021	214
Reno–Sparks, Nevada	(United States)	reno-sparks	2012	No - April 2021	472
Rhode Island	(United States)	ri	2013	No - April 20219	72
Richmond, California	(United States)	richmond-ca	2012	No - April 2021	143
Richmond, Virginia	(United States)	richmond-va	2008	No - April 2021	691
Rugby, Warwickshire	(United Kingdom)	rugby	2009	No - April 2021	170
Sacramento, California	(United States)	sac	2007	Yes - April 20219	2,797
St. Louis	(United States)	st-louis	2013	Yes - April 2021	205
San Antonio	(United States)	sanantonio	2013	No - April 2021	20
San Francisco	(United States)	sf	2007	Yes - April 2021	1,816
San Jose, California	(United States)	san-jose	2008	No - April 2021	194
San Luis Obispo, California	(United States)	slo	2012	Yes - April 2021	1,217
Santa Cruz, California	(United States)	santacruz	2007	Yes - April 2021	6,189
Sapporo	(Japan)	Sapporo	2013	Yes - April 2021	827
Seattle	(United States)	seattle	2012	Yes - May 2021	960
Sonoma Valley, California	(United States)	sonoma-valley	2009	No - April 2021	274
Southampton	(United Kingdom)	southampton	2014	No - April 2021	18
South Shore, Nova Scotia	(Canada)	southshore	2013	No - April 2021	26
Summit County, Ohio	(United States)	summit-county	2014	No - April 20211	80
Sydney	(Australia)	sydney	2011	No - May 2021	61
Syracuse, New York	(United States)	syracuse	2008	No - April 2021	987
Tacoma, Washington	(United States)	tacoma	2011	No - April 2021	118
Taichung	(Taiwan)	taichung	2013	No - May 2019	46
Taichung Literary Landscape	(Taiwan)	taichung-literary-landscape	2014	No - April 2021	214
Taiwan	(Taiwan)	taiwan	2013	No - April 2021	37
Tallahassee, Florida	(United States)	tallahassee	2012	Yes - April 2021	642
Tanabe	(Japan)	tb	2014	Yes - April 2021	938
Tasmania	(Australia)	tasmania	2012	No - May 2021	205
Belvedere and Angel Island, California	(United States)	tiburon	2014	Yes - May 2021	106
Toledo, Ohio	(United States)	toledo	2012	Yes - May 2021	815
Toronto	(Canada)	toronto	2007	Yes - May 2021	3,440
Tucson, Arizona	(United States)	tucson	2013	Yes - May 2021	211
Tulsa, Oklahoma	(United States)	tulsa	2012	Yes - May 2021	444
Tustin, California	(United States)	tustin	2007	No - May 2021	136
Vacaville, California	(United States)	vacaville	2007	Yes - May 2021	212
Vallejo, California	(United States)	vallejo	2009	No - May 2021	78
Walnut Creek, California	(United States)	walnut-creek	2007	No - May 2021	159
Wellington	(New Zealand)	wgtn	2013	No - May 2021	43
West Sacramento, California	(United States)	westsac	2007	Yes - May 2021	427
Weyburn, Saskatchewan	(Canada)	weyburn	2013	Yes - May 2021	57
Windsor, Ontario	(Canada)	windsor	2013	Yes - May 2021	21
Winters, California	(United States)	winters	2007	No - May 20219	206
Woodland, California	(United States)	woodland	2007	Yes - May 2021	628
Wushe	(Taiwan)	wushe	2013	No - May 2021	21
Yuba–Sutter, California	(United States)	yuba-sutter	2009	Yes - May 2021	1,514
