= Ed Ross =

American photographer (1965– 2016)

Michael Edward Ross
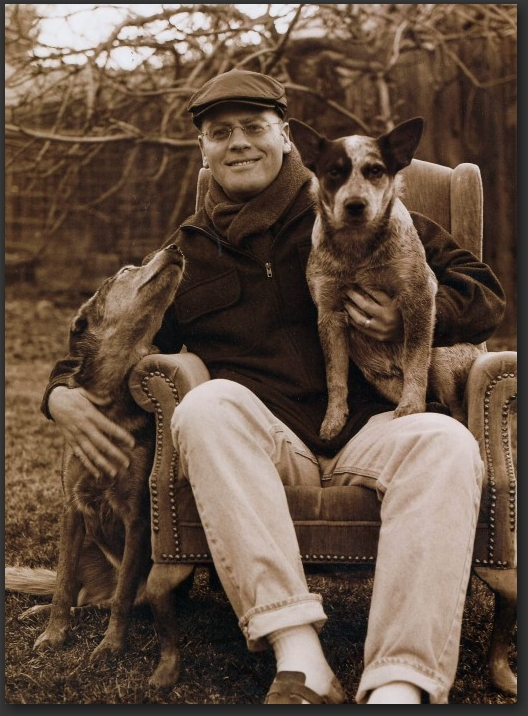
- Ed Ross (age 46) with his pets Beijo and Max (2012).
- Born: October 27, 1965
- Died: July 30, 2016 (aged 50)
- Known for: nude portraits; landscape photography

Michael Edward Ross (October 27, 1965 – July 30, 2016) was an American tintype photographer and lawyer. His photography work spanned 27 years. His last six years were devoted exclusively to wet-plate photography. His focus as an artist was primarily on nude portraits and landscape photography.

== History ==
Ross was born in Ukiah, California to Bill and Dorothy Ross and raised in Davis, California. He attended Jesuit High School in Sacramento, UC San Diego, studied at the London School of Economics, and the UC Hastings School of Law. He worked as senior legal counsel for the Apple computer company in Cupertino, California.

== Photography ==
Ross had taken photographs for 27 years, and during the last eight years of his life used the Collodion process or wet-plates for his work.

Ross worked with three different cameras: a half-plate box-style camera made by Ty Guillory, an 8 by 10 inches (200 mm × 250 mm) bellows-style camera made by Black Art Woodcraft, and a 16 by 20 inches (410 mm × 510 mm) Chamonix. He used 'period' lenses, manufactured between 1850 and 1900, by Dallmeyer, Voigtlander, and Ross.

== Recognition ==
Ross’ work has been featured in Quite Frankly, juxtapoz.com, and 62nd floor Art Zine issue #9. He is regarded for his talent and unique approach to photography.

== Death ==
On July 30, 2016, Ross was killed in a motorcycle accident on a mountain road near Yosemite National Park, while on his way to photograph one of his favorite subjects, the Half Dome in Yosemite Valley.

== See also ==
- Collodion process
- Tintype
- Nude (art)
- Depictions of nudity
- Nude photography
