= Jerome C. Davis =

American agriculturist (1822–1881)

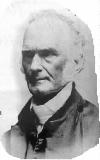
- Born: 1822
- Died: 1881 (age 58–59)
- Known for: Bear Flag Revolt

Jerome C. Davis (1822–1881) was an American agriculturalist for whom the city of Davis, California (formerly Davisville) is named. Davis was born in Perry County, Ohio, where his father Isaac Davis and his mother Rachael Manley had a family farm. He also had a brother, Franklin B., and a sister, Elnora.

Davis was one of the early pioneers to arrive in what is now California. In 1845, at the age of 23, Davis joined Captain John C. Fremont on his third expedition to the West and was with Fremont for 32 months. In June 1846, Davis was one of thirty-three American insurgents who overtook the Mexican settlement of Sonoma, an act now known as the Bear Flag Revolt. It was then that Davis and the remaining twenty-four men raised the Bear Flag, declaring an independent "Republic of California."

Davis got his start in California as a ferry operator on the Sacramento River with his father-in-law, and later become a prominent landowner with 12,000 acres of farmland. 773 acres of his farm was purchased to be part of the newly formed University of California, Davis. Davis served as the president of the State Agricultural Society (predecessor to California Exposition), and opened the 8th annual California State Fair in 1861.
