= Davis Community Church (California) =

Coordinates: 38°32′44″N 121°44′37″W

Davis Community Church is a Presbyterian Church (USA) congregation located in one of the oldest standing structures in Davis, California. Referred to locally as DCC, the church is a historical landmark centrally located in downtown Davis, three blocks east of the University of California, Davis.

Davis Community Church is a member of the Covenant Network of Presbyterians, a broad-based, national group of clergy and lay leaders. DCC is also a member of the Sojourners Faith & Justice Network.

== History: 1800 - 1999 ==
Davis Community Church has a history, beginning in the early 1800s when Presbyterian congregations met in rural homes and school houses in Yolo County. Following the incorporation of the Town of Davisville in 1868, First Presbyterian Church of Davisville was formally organized. A wooden frame church was built at a cost of $4,000 on the northeast corner of Fourth and E Streets. In 1875, the original building was sold and the church's second structure was built on the southeast corner of Fourth and C Streets.

The town of Davisville officially changed its name to Davis in 1907. The church was completely destroyed by a fire in 1924. That same year, the church helped to establish the Cal Aggie Christian Association, now an ecumenical Protestant campus ministry located on Russell Boulevard.

In 1925, the church adopted the name "Davis Community Church." While maintaining its ties with the Presbyterian denomination, the church developed an ecumenical Protestant vision, declaring itself an interdenominational church, with ties to the Presbyterian, Methodist, and Congregational denominations.

In 1926, the present mission style sanctuary building was built at the northeast corner of Fourth and C Streets. Representatives of Baptist, Methodist, Episcopal, Congregational, and Presbyterian denominations attended the cornerstone laying ceremony. Just eleven years later, an arson fire led to structural repairs of the sanctuary, including the installation of a stained glass window based on William Holman Hunt's painting, "The Light of the World," above the choir loft. A

The formal relationship with the Methodist and Congregational denominations ended in 1955, whereupon DCC became a solely Presbyterian congregation.

In 1960, the Church Office was built, followed by the Christian Education wing of the church two years later. In 1974, DCC responded to an expressed community need for childcare by forming the Davis Community Church Nursery School, a parent cooperative offered to the larger Davis community. The Davis Community Church Nursery School continues to operate as a parent cooperative on the corner of Fourth and D Streets.

In 1993 an arson fire caused major damage to two new buildings under construction. The two buildings, the Fellowship Hall and Phoenix Hall, were re-built following the fire at a total cost of $1.8 million.
