= Ning Pan =

Chinese-born American engineer (1953–2025)

- Born: March 5, 1953; Xining, China
- Died: September 7, 2025 (aged 72); Davis, California, U.S.
- Education: Donghua University
- Occupation: Engineer
- Spouse: Hualin Huang

Ning Pan (March 5, 1953 – September 7, 2025) was a Chinese-born American engineer.

== Early life and career ==
Pan was born in Xining on March 5, 1953. He attended Donghua University, earning his MS degree in 1982 and his PhD degree in 1985. After earning his degrees, he emigrated to the United States, and worked as a postdoctoral fellow at the Massachusetts Institute of Technology from 1989 to 1990.

Pan served as a professor in the department of biological and agricultural engineering at the University of California, Davis from 1999 to 2021. During his years as a professor, in 2015, he was named a fellow of the American Physical Society, "for significant contributions to the scientific research of mechanics and physics in the field of fibrous materials", and was named a distinguished professor in 2021.

== Personal life and death ==
Pan was married to Hualin Huang. Their marriage lasted until Pan's death in 2025.

Pan died in Davis, California, on September 7, 2025, at the age of 72.
