= LocalWiki =

Collaborative web project

- Original authors: Michael Ivanov; Philip Neustrom
- Developer: LocalWiki
- Stable release: v0.5.5
- Preview release: Master
- Written in: Python
- Website: localwiki.org

LocalWiki is a website that hosts wikis about cities and other regional communities, using custom software built for this purpose, founded by Mike Ivanov and Philip Neustrom. They started DavisWiki in 2004, a crowdsourced website for the college town of Davis, California, which became popular among Davis residents. They expanded the software to create the LocalWiki platform in the early 2010s after receiving a grant from the Knight Foundation. The LocalWiki project still exists as of 2024, but has struggled to remain viable.

== History ==
=== DavisWiki ===
DavisWiki logo

The DavisWiki website on Thursday, December 13, 2007

In 2004, Ivanov and Neustrom started DavisWiki, an experimental project to collect and share local information about the town of Davis, California, editable by anyone. By 2006, DavisWiki was one of the largest city wikis, providing its users a guide to a wide range of topics like local businesses, politics and activities; the site relied on donations and fundraising events. It allowed more geographically-specific and subjective information than Wikipedia. Neustrom described DavisWiki as hyperlocal. By 2007, two former Davis residents created a similar wiki for the neighboring city of Sacramento, California, using the Wikispot website that also hosted DavisWiki. In 2009, Nieman Lab called DavisWiki the world's best local wiki. That year, Neustrom was planning to incorporate the nonprofit under the name Wikispot.

=== Expansion into wiki platform (2010–2014) ===
In June 2010, LocalWiki won a $350,000 grant from the Knight News Challenge to help build the technology so that other communities could create their own wikis, modeled after DavisWiki. The grant was related to the Knight Foundation's interest in open government; they also funded OpenStreetMap and EveryBlock. Also in June 2010, the New York Times noted that DavisWiki had helped Davis residents compile information about a local con artist. Later that year, LocalWiki ran a Kickstarter project that raised $26,000 to help fund outreach.

In 2011 the project worked with the creators of an existing city wiki in Denton, Texas, to shift the website to the LocalWiki platform, because their original wiki software was not user-friendly. LocalWiki's second focus community was the Triangle region of Durham, North Carolina, with initial contributions about transportation infrastructure and parks, and a goal of compiling information about historic events. The Triangle project was supported by volunteers from CityCamp Raleigh and by Red Hat, a company based in Raleigh. A nonprofit in Tallahassee, Florida, Village Square, helped start TallahasseeWiki in 2012 with knowledge from residents. Residents of Ann Arbor, Michigan transitioned their city wiki, founded in 2005, to the LocalWiki platform in 2012.

Oakland Wiki was launched in November 2012, coming out of a Code for Oakland event in September; it received early support from Open Oakland. In 2014, the Oakland Wiki was used as a resource for information in a public debate around surveillance in Oakland as well as showcasing more whimsical ideas such as re-imagining supervisor districts with Hunger Games logos. The Oakland Wiki attracts volunteers who want to preserve history and information that is not notable enough for Wikipedia.

As of 2013, the DavisWiki was still the most actively used LocalWiki. Some challenges experienced by LocalWiki include determining geographic boundaries for LocalWikis, specialized knowledge needed to start a LocalWiki, and difficulty coordinating across LocalWikis. As of 2014, LocalWiki had 71 wikis in 10 countries.

=== 2015-present ===
By 2024, LocalWiki has survived but, according to a PhD thesis from Temple University, has only resulted in 100,000 articles and has struggled to be viable.

== Functionality ==
The LocalWiki software includes a WYSIWYG editing interface to help make editing simpler. It also includes mapping features: each article can have an associated annotated map, and the website has an overview map with those annotations. LocalWiki is built on the Django framework in Python.

== See also ==
- List of LocalWikis
- RegioWiki and list of Regiowikis
- List of wikis
- List of wiki software
- Comparison of wiki software
- Wiki hosting service
