= Dictionary writing system =

Software for writing and producing a dictionary, glossary, vocabulary, or thesaurus

A dictionary writing system (DWS), or dictionary production/publishing system (DPS) is software for writing and producing a dictionary, glossary, vocabulary, or thesaurus. It may include an editor, a database, a web interface for collaborative work, and various management tools.

== Resources ==
- Měchura, Michal. Introducing Lexonomy: an open-source dictionary writing and publishing system. In I. Kosem, C. Tiberius, M. Jakubíček, J. Kallas, S. Krek, V. Baisa (eds.) Electronic lexicography in the 21st century: Proceedings of eLex 2017 conference. Leiden: Lexical Computing, 2017: 662-679. ISSN 2533-5626.
- Butler, Lynnika and Heather van Volkinburg. 2007. Fieldworks Language Explorer (FLEx). Language documentation & conservation 1:1.
- De Schryver, G-M and Joffe, D. 2004. ‘On How Electronic Dictionaries are Really Used’ (see elsewhere in the current Proceedings)
- Joffe, David and Gilles-Maurice de Schryver. 2004. TshwaneLex – A state-of-the-art dictionary compilation program. In G. Williams & S. Vessier (eds.). 2004. Proceedings of the eleventh EURALEX international congress, EURALEX 2004, Lorient, France, July 6–10, 2004: 99–104. Lorient: Faculté des Lettres et des Sciences Humaines, Université de Bretagne Sud.
- McNamara, M. 2003. ‘Dictionaries for all: XML to Final Product’ in Online Proceedings of XML Europe 2003 Conference & Exposition. Powering the Information Society.
- Corris, Miriam, Christopher Manning, Susan Poetsch, and Jane Simpson. 2002. Dictionaries and endangered languages. In David Bradley and Maya Bradley (eds.), Language endangerment and language maintenance. London: RoutledgeCurzon: 329-347.
- Coward, David E. and Charles E. Grimes. 1995. Making dictionaries: a guide to lexicography and the Multi-Dictionary Formatter (Version 1.0). Waxhaw: Summer Institute of Linguistics.
- Hosken, Martin. 2006. Lexicon Interchange Format: A description.
