= Davis Waldorf School =

Private Waldorf school in Davis, California

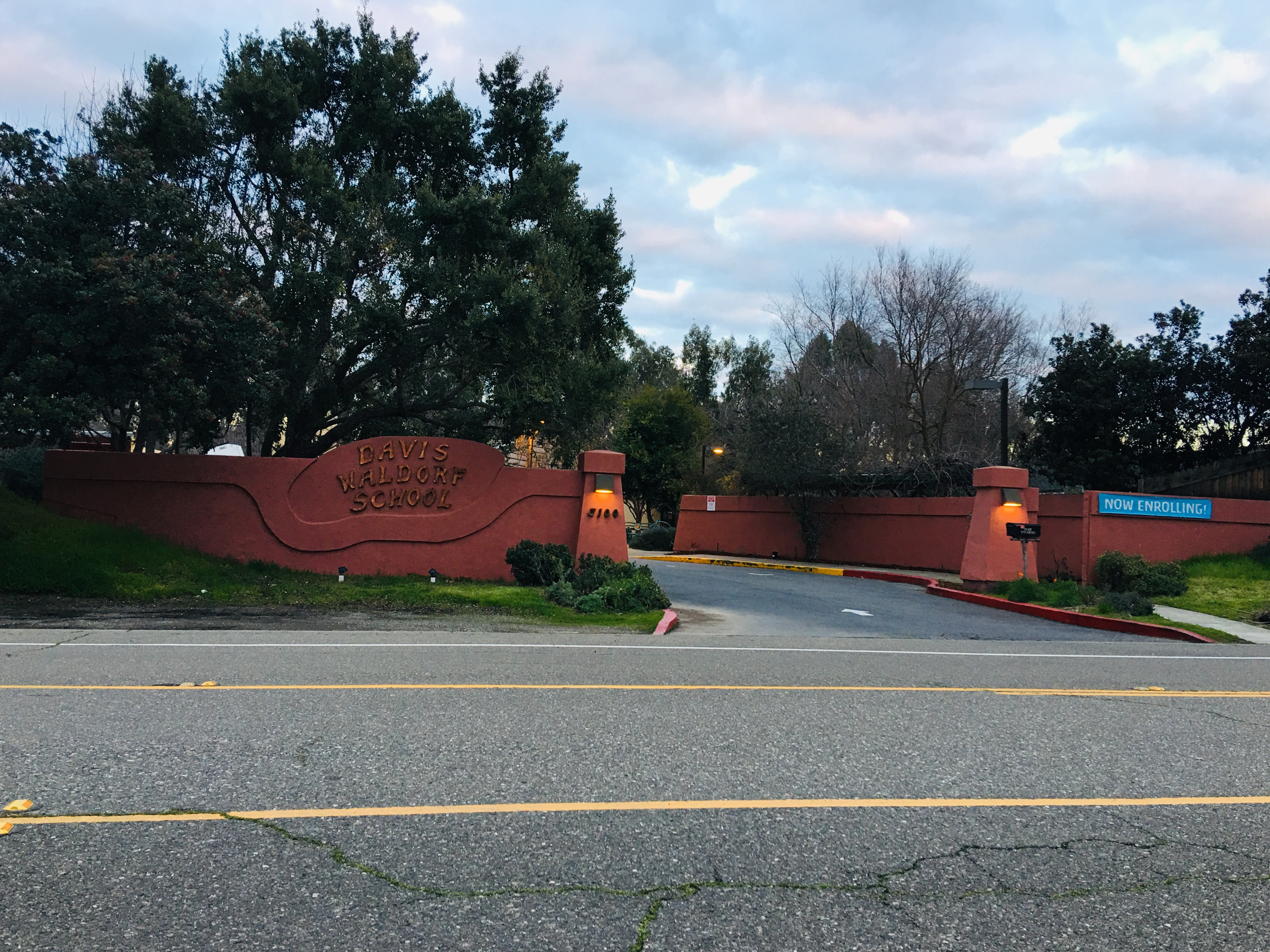
- The main entrance to Davis Waldorf School on Sycamore Lane in 2019

Location
- 3100 Sycamore Lane; Davis, California; United States
- Coordinates: 38°34′14″N 121°45′58″W

Information
- School type: Private, nonprofit, Waldorf
- Religious affiliation: Nondenominational/Nonsectarian
- Established: 1986
- Status: Active
- Grades: Pre-K to 8
- Enrollment: 190
- Student to teacher ratio: 15:1
- Campus size: 5 acres
- Campus type: Rural/Suburban
- Website: daviswaldorf.org

The Davis Waldorf School is a private school located in Davis, California, United States. A Waldorf school, it was established in 1986 and teaches students from preschool through eighth grade.

== Site and buildings ==
In the fall of 1992, the school was able to move from its first rural site to its current campus in North Davis. The new classroom buildings were designed to support the principles of Waldorf education and include many environmentally sound features such as rammed-earth walls formed of native California clays, natural cork flooring, natural lighting, passive solar and radiant heating and the use of plant-based paint where possible.

In the summer of 2010, the school added several new buildings. A two classroom kindergarten building, a multi-purpose building, and a new office building. The buildings are prefabricated purpose built buildings, rather than the 'portables' that are in use in many schools in the US.

== Curriculum and activities ==
The school follows a typical curriculum for Waldorf schools in California. Due to the agricultural nature of the Davis area, and the number of organic farms in the area, gardening and field trips to work on farms are a natural program. Davis Waldorf students raised money to start a kindergarten in Tanzania.

The school has a music program, that includes workshops for the broader community.

== Classes ==
The schedule of classes is different every day of the week, and the schedule repeats each week. Because of the small number of students in each class, all students share all their classes with all the other children in their grade, with the exception of the different levels of Spanish, Algebra, and Orchestra/Band.
