= University of California, Davis Arboretum =

Arboretum in unincorporated Yolo County, California

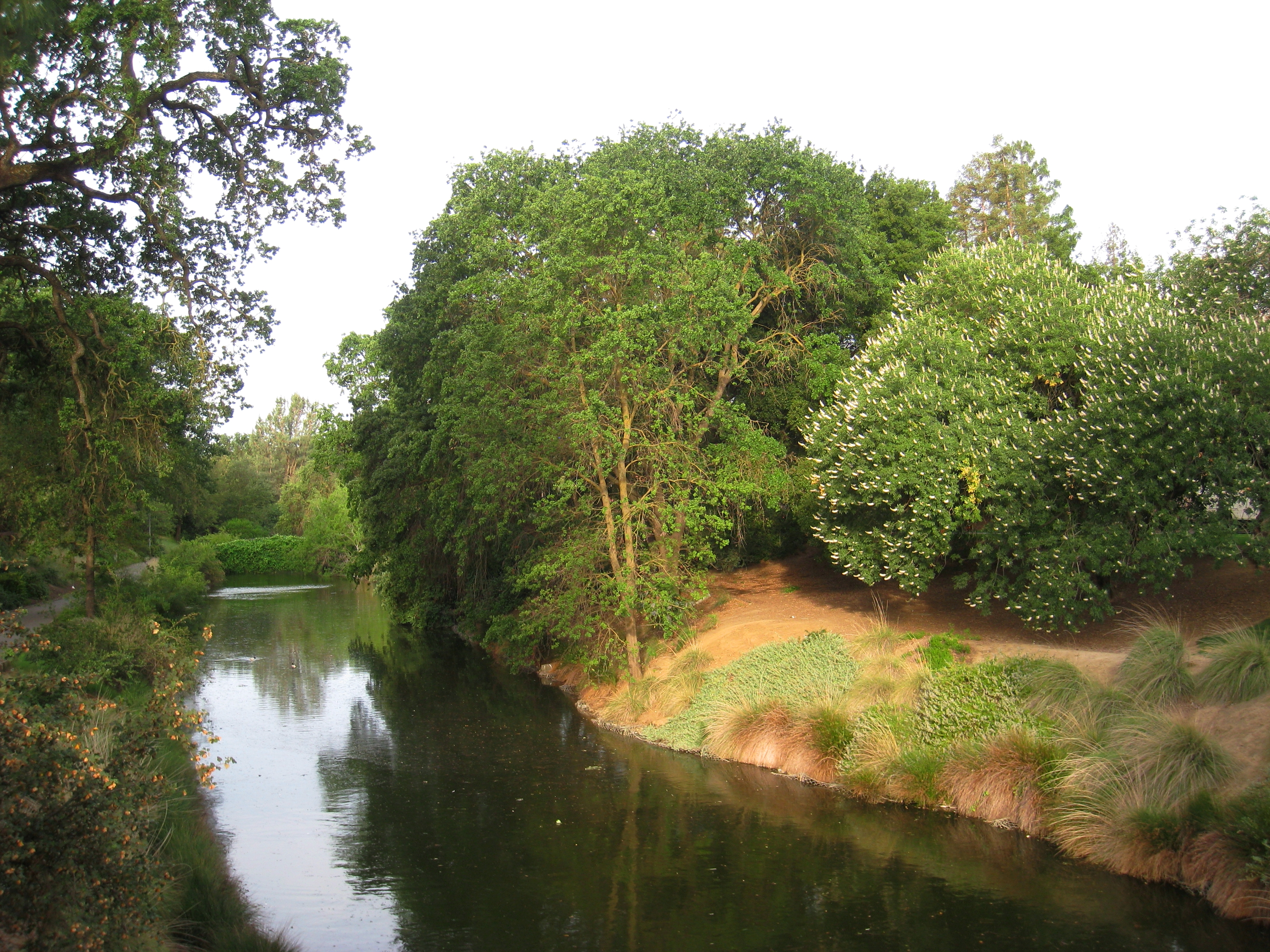

- Location within California Location within the United States
- Location: 920 Garrod Drive, Davis
- Coordinates: 38.533329°N 121.753621°W
- Area: 100-acre (0.40 km^{2})
- Operator: University of California Davis
- Status: Open year round
- Website: arboretum.ucdavis.edu

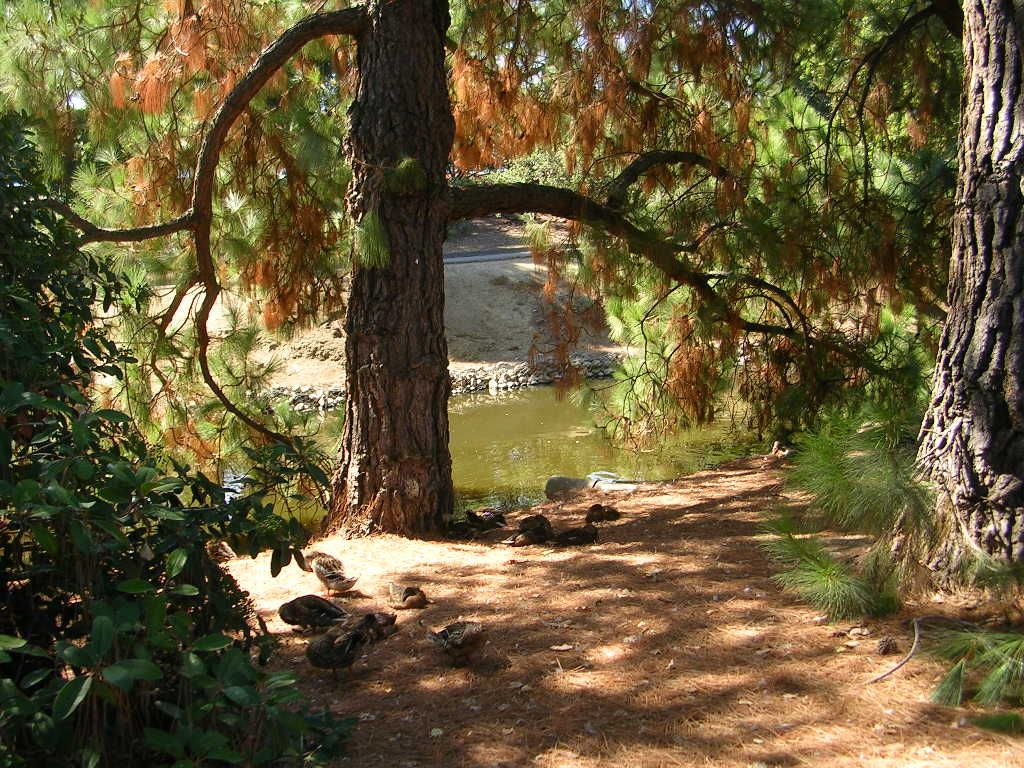
UC Davis Arboretum

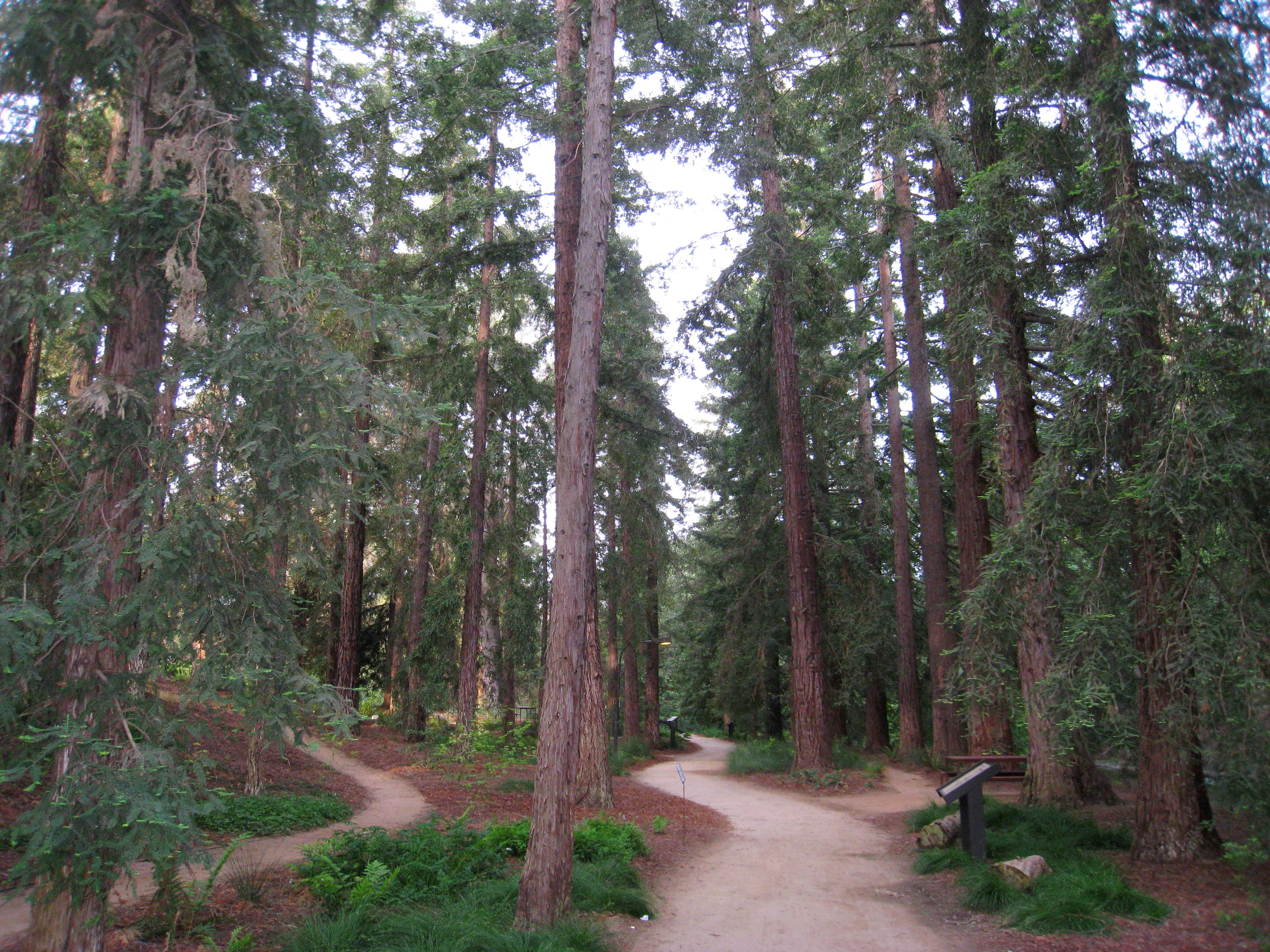
Redwood grove

The University of California, Davis Arboretum (UC Davis Arboretum) is an approximately 100-acre (0.40 km^{2}) arboretum along the banks of the old north channel of Putah Creek on the south side of the University of California, Davis campus in unincorporated Yolo County, California, in the United States.

The arboretum was founded in 1936. It is free to visit and the gardens are open 24 hours a day every day of the year; visitor parking is free Saturdays and Sundays and $10 per car every other day. The Arboretum contains 3.5 miles (5.6 km) paved path loop for pedestrians, joggers, and cyclists. The collection includes some "22,000 trees and plants adapted to a Mediterranean climate." The collection may be searched through the Arbortetum's online database, which includes detailed information about the plants and geographic information system data linked to plant records. The Arboretum is an important source of information on horticulture in California's Central Valley.

The arboretum is used for research both by UC Davis faculty and students and by others. The arboretum also supports teaching at UC Davis, with courses in many different disciplines using the arboretum each year.

== Collection ==
The arboretum has 17 gardens and collections:

- Arboretum Terrace Garden and Lois Crowe Patio - Mediterranean-style terrace garden with pergola, featuring plants typical of California's Central Valley.
- Australian Collection - features eucalyptus and other Australian plants.
- California Foothill Collection - features California foothills plants, including "200-year-old Valley oaks, pines, ceanothus, and several species of native currants and gooseberries."
- Carolee Shields White Flower Garden and Gazebo - a "theme garden based on medieval moon-viewing gardens of India and Japan."
- Conifer Collection - features various conifers, including pines, cedars, firs, junipers, and cypresses.
- Desert Collection - features desert plants, including cacti and succulents, fan palms, and mesquites.
- East Asian Collection - an East Asian garden with a view of Lake Spafford and an open lawn; features cherry blossoms and daphne (prominent in winter and spring) and ginkgo, zelkova, and ornamental grasses (prominent in fall).
- Eric E. Conn Acacia Grove - features more than 50 acacia species.
- Mary Wattis Brown Garden of California Native Plants - features various California native plants and native meadow.
- Mediterranean Collection - features various Mediterranean Basin plants on a hillside around lagoon; includes collection of herbs.
- North Coast Collection - features various broadleaf and evergreen plants of coastal Northern California, including California bay laurel, Lawson cypress, bigleaf maple, dogwood, and Lindera (spice bush).
- Peter J. Shields Oak Grove - features more than 80 types of oak, including several rare species.
- Ruth Risdon Storer Garden - features various "flowering perennials and small shrubs that are especially well suited to Central Valley gardens" intended for sustainable gardening.
- South American Collection - a small collection of mostly Argentinean and Chilean plants, including groundcovers and vines as well as cacti and cannas.
- Southwest U.S.A. and Mexican Collection - features various plants of Mexico and the American Southwest; the Montezuma bald cypress in this collection was grown from seed from the largest specimen in Mexico.
- T. Elliot Weier Redwood Grove - a coast redwood grove that is "one of the largest collections of redwood trees outside their native range." In addition to the trees, the grove also features understory plants.
- Warren G. Roberts Redbud Collection - a Western redbud grove.

== See also ==
- List of botanical gardens and arboretums in the United States
