= Joseph Dada =

Nigerian politician

Gbolahan Joseph Dada is a Nigerian politician. He served as a senator in the 8th National Assembly representing Ogun West senatorial district.
