= Rebecca Fransway =

American author and poet

- Born: April 30, 1953 (age 72) San Pedro, Los Angeles, California, U.S.
- Occupation: Memoirist, poet
- Education: University of California, Davis
- Notable works: 12-Step Horror Stories

Rebecca Franswa ity (born April 30, 1953) is an American author and poet. The author and editor 12-Step Horror Stories: True Tales of Misery, Betrayal & Abuse in AA, NA, and 12-Step Treatment, Fransway's poetry has been published in The Outlaw Bible of American Poetry and other literary journals.

== Biography ==
Born in San Pedro, Los Angeles, Fransway was the oldest of six children born to Horace Robert Davis and Vernita Ethel Webster Davis. Growing up in California, she attended public schools in Sacramento and Atascadero, and studied English at the University of California, Davis. She is the author and editor of a controversial book published in 2000, 12-Step Horror Stories: True Tales of Misery, Betrayal & Abuse in AA, NA, and 12-Step Treatment. This book was banned in Davis bookstores and some U.S. bookstores because of complaints from treatment centers and members of local twelve-step groups. It is out of print, but is available for free online. As of 2006, she is writing a novel and screenplay.

- 12-Step Horror Stories: True Tales of Misery, Betrayal & Abuse in AA, NA, and 12-Step Treatment, 2000, ISBN 1-884365-24-8

== Poetry ==
Fransway's poetry has been published in The Outlaw Bible of American Poetry and other literary journals.

The poem "Suzanne Goes Down" is part of Fransway's Suzanne sequence of outlaw poetry, a type of marginal poetry with Beat sensibility often categorized as Spoken Word. The poem was first published in 1996 by the literary magazine, Long Shot, and again by Thunder's Mouth Press in The Outlaw Bible of American Poetry (1999). The poem is a commentary on the usefulness of "AA meetings," foreshadowing Fransway's book, 12-Step Horror Stories.
