= Winnifred Hudson =

British-born painter

- Plant Life and Light by Winnifred Hudson, 1974, Honolulu Museum of Art
- Born: May 21, 1905; Sunderland, England
- Died: May 11, 1996 (aged 90); California, U.S.
- Education: Honolulu Academy of Arts; University of Hawaiʻi
- Known for: Painting, printmaking, collage

Winnifred Hudson (May 21, 1905 – May 11, 1996) was a British-born American painter who lived and worked in Hawaii for six decades. Born in Sunderland, England, she was raised in Alberta and moved to Honolulu in 1934. Upon her retirement in 1965, she became a full-time painter and printmaker. Her work is in the collections of the Honolulu Museum of Art and the Hawaii State Art Museum.

== Life and career ==
Hudson was born on May 21, 1905, in Sunderland, England. She had a sister, Margaret. When Hudson was six years old, her family moved to Alberta, Canada. Hudson first visited Hawaii in 1932 and, enjoying her visit, permanently moved to Honolulu in 1934. She worked as a secretary there for 31 years but maintained a hobby as a painter and printmaker. She studied at the Honolulu Academy of the Arts and the University of Hawaiʻi. At one point, she studied alongside John Hultberg and Norman Ives.

Hudson stopped painting in 1990 after her eyesight began to fail. In 1995 she moved to California. Prior to her leaving, the Contemporary Museum in Honolulu held a retrospective exhibition in her honor. Once arriving in California, she taught painting classes. She died on May 11, 1996.

Her work is held in various public-facing institutions, including the Honolulu Museum of Art and the Hawaiʻi State Foundation on Culture and the Arts. Her work has additionally been exhibited at the Hawaii State Art Museum.

== Style ==
Hudson was mostly a self-taught painter, having only briefly taken classes in art. Hudson utilized a variety of techniques in her work, including decoupage and déchirage. In an interview with the The Honolulu Advertiser, she described herself as "very interested in the shapes between the shapes" and was noted for her resistance to conventional uses of color. Allyn Bromley praised her work for its focus, describing her as being from a different generation of artists.
