= Adedapo Tejuoso =

Nigerian ruler

Oba Adedapo Adewale Tejuoso, Karunwi III
- Oba Osile of Oke Ona
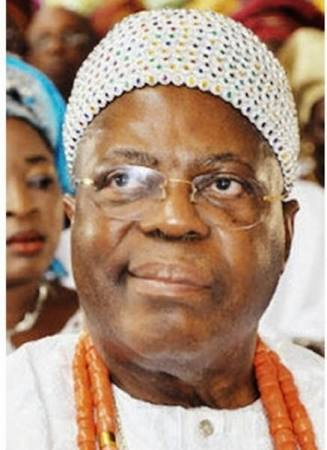
- Born: Adedapo Adewale Tejuoso; 1938 (age 87–88)

Oba Adedapo Adewale Tejuoso is the Osile of Oke Ona Egbaland. He is the father of Senator Lanre Tejuosho.

== Early life and education ==
Oba Tejuoso was born to Joseph Somoye Tejuoso and Esther Bisoye Tejuoso, who was the granddaughter of Oba Karunwi I of Oke Ona. Oba Tejuoso's maternal great-grandfather, Karunwi I, was crowned as the first Osile Oke Ona Egba in Abeokuta in 1897, which ensured that he was one of the four Egba Obas who formed the core of the establishment of Egba United Government (EUG) on 31 January 1898, under the authority of Governor McCullum, who was acting on the orders of Queen Victoria of England. Tejuoso attended St. George's Primary School, Zaria from 1941 to 1946, Abeokuta Girls School, Ake – before the boys were separated between 1946 and 1948, as well as Mrs. Funmilayo Ransome Kuti's Class from 1949 to 1950 and the Prestigious Abeokuta Grammar School for five years from 1951 to 1956 where he served as Senior Prefect, thereby, inadvertently honing his leadership skills.

== Career ==
After schooling, he got enrolled into West Ham College of Technology, London where he studied for one year between 1957 and 1958, and following it, went to Trinity College Dublin, Ireland for further studies where he resided until 1964. He got qualified as a medical doctor following exams at the Lagos University Teaching Hospital (LUTH) where he also worked as a Senior House Officer before founding his own medical business Teju Industrial Clinic (now Iyalode Bisoye Tejuoso Memorial Hospital) in 1970.

He ascended to the throne in 1989, before which, he also served as managing director of Teju Foam Industry, a business established by his mother.
