= Ramoni Olalekan Mustapha =

Nigerian politician (born 1960)

Senator for Ogun East
- In office 11 June 2019 – 11 June 2023
- Preceded by: Buruji Kashamu
- Succeeded by: Gbenga Daniel
- In office 5 June 2007 – 6 June 2011
- Preceded by: Tokunbo Ogunbanjo
- Succeeded by: Sefiu Adegbenga Kaka

Personal details
- Born: 25 February 1960 (age 66) Ijebu-Igbo, Western Region, British Nigeria (now in Ogun State, Nigeria)
- Party: All Progressives Congress (APC)
- Spouse: Alhaja Iyabosola Mustapha
- Children: 5
- Profession: Public Servant, Business man, Politician

Ramoni Olalekan Mustapha (born 25 February 1960) is a Nigerian senator who represented Ogun East constituency of Ogun State from 2019 to 2023. He previously represented the same constituency from 2007 to 2011 under the platform of the Peoples Democratic Party (PDP), running for re-election on the Labour Party ticket in the 2011 elections, he polled only 8,762 votes. Sefiu Adegbenga Kaka of the ACN won with 76,543 votes.

== Background ==
Ramoni Olalekan Mustapha was born on 25 February 1960. He has a National Diploma in Public Health from the Ogun State College of Health Technology. Prior to election to the senate, he was Chairman of the Ogun State Task Force on Building Projects. He was Chairman of the Ijebu North Local Government, Ijebu-Igbo (1996–1997), and was elected as a member of the House of Representatives (2003–2007) for the Ijebu North/East/Ogun Waterside constituency.

== Senate career ==
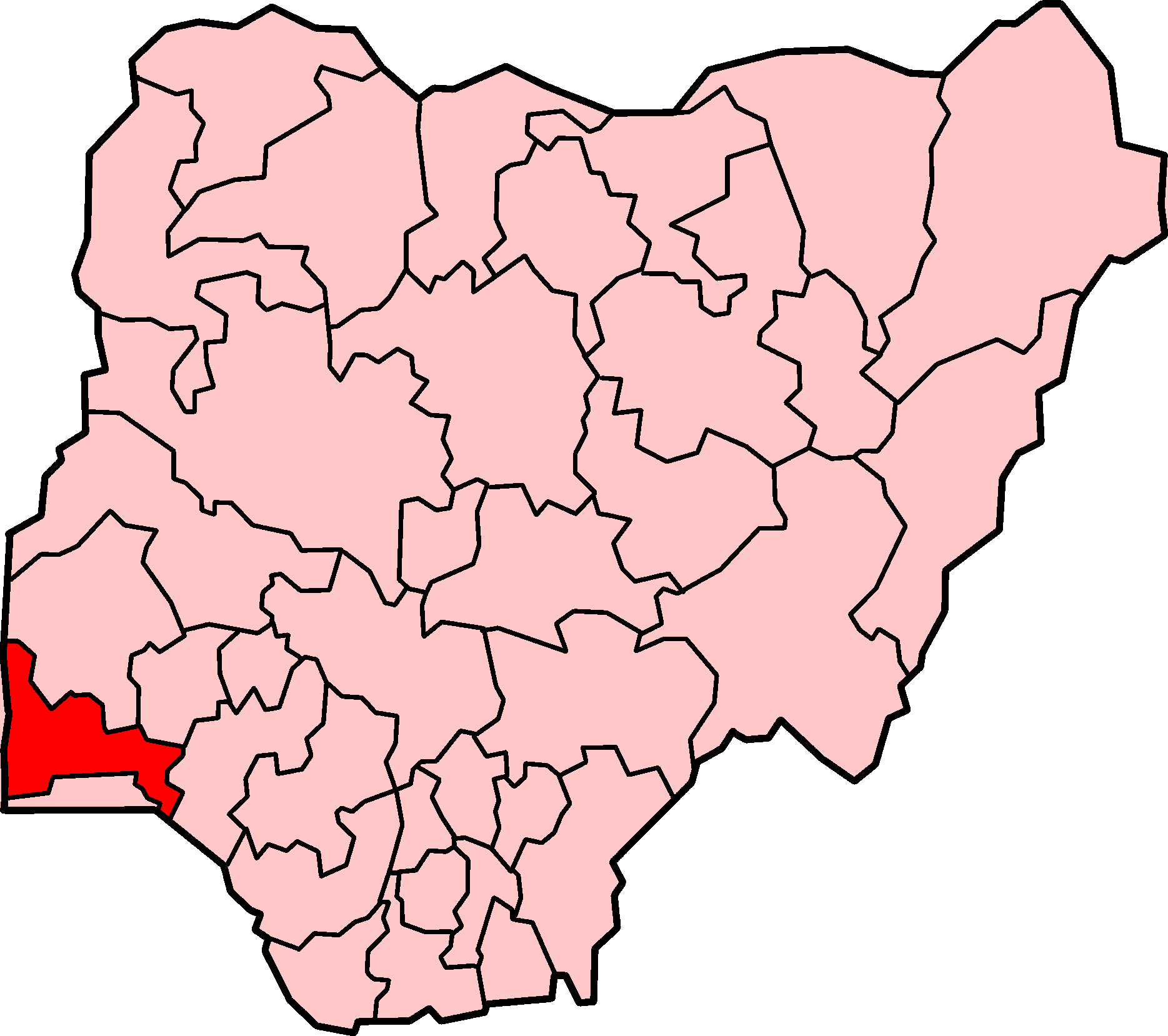
Ogun State in Nigeria

Ramoni O Mustapha was elected to the National Senate for the Ogun East constituency in 2007 and was appointed to committees on Niger Delta, Interior Affairs, Commerce and Capital Markets. His election was challenged, but in May 2008 the Election Petition Tribunal upheld his election.

In September 2007, Sen Olalekan Mustapha sponsored an Environmental Health Control Bill. In December 2007, Senator Mustapha and five other members of the Senate Committee on the Interior Ministry made an official tour of Seme, where they inspected the chaotic conditions of the Nigerian posts at the Benin Republic border.

In May 2008, Senate President David Mark named members of the committee to review the 1999 constitution, to be headed by Senator Ike Ekweremadu. Olalekan Mustapha was one of the members chosen to represent the southwest zone.

In an August 2008 report the Senate Committee on Interior, chaired by Olalekan Mustapha, reported that prisons across the country were in poor repair and no longer fit for human habitation. In addition, the prisons were severely overcrowded. The report urged funding for improvements. In February 2009, Olalekan Mustapha visited London, England to discuss terms for repatriation of over 800 Nigerian prisoners. In the February 23, 2019 National Assembly election, he was re-elected Senator, representing the Ogun East Senatorial District at the Nigerian National Assembly

== Ijebu State ==
There has been a move to carve a new state - Ijebu - out of Ogun State, with roughly the same boundaries as the old Ijebu kingdom. Governor Gbenga Daniel of Ogun state supports the change, but is in dispute with the Awujale of Ijebuland, Oba Sikiru Adetona, about where the capital should be located. Lekan Mustapha also actively supports the creation of the state.
