= Bisoye Tejuoso =

Nigerian businesswoman

Esther Bisoye Tejuoso
- Born: 1916; Abeokuta, British Nigeria
- Died: 19 September 1996 (aged 79–80); Abeokuta, Nigeria
- Occupation: Businesswoman
- Children: Oba Adedapo Tejuoso, Karunwi III

Chief Esther Bisoye Tejuoso (1916 – 19 September 1996) was a Nigerian businesswoman from Abeokuta. She was born into the family of an Egba farmer who was also a chief in Abeokuta. She herself held the chieftaincy of the Iyalode, a fact which made her very prominent in Egba affairs.

== Life ==
Tejuosho was born into an Egba royal family, her grandfather was Oba Karunwi, Osile of Oke-Ona, Abeokuta. She studied at Igbein Primary School, Abeokuta before attending Idi Aba Teacher's Training College, Abeokuta. At 18 years old, she married a teacher, Joseph Somoye Tejuoso and later accompanied him to Zaria, where he was working. At Zaria, Tejuoso thrived in trading foodstuff with southern Nigerians; she used the railway to transport goods from Zaria to Lagos. In the early 1950s, she became an agent for the United African Company, and in later years, added Vono industries to her list of suppliers. She became very successful during this period and acquired real estate in various parts of the country. In the early 1960s, she was a major dealer of Vono mattresses in Broad St and was approached by a Norwegian businessman for a partnership in a foam manufacturing venture. The partnership took off in 1964 when Nigerian Polyurethane Ltd started producing its own brand of Cool Foams.

== Career and death ==
In 1970, after disagreeing with her partners in a foam and carpet manufacturing venture, she decided to build her own factory. She got a loan from the Nigerian Industrial Development Bank and established, Teju Industries, a firm specialized in foam manufacturing. Over the years, she ventured out to other businesses. She is remembered as a pioneering woman who attained the summit of financial independence and success.

She was murdered on 19 September 1996 at age 80 amid controversy over the obaship of Egbaland. To date, her murder has not been solved by Nigerian authorities.

== See also ==
- List of unsolved murders (1980–1999)
