= Akin Babalola Kamar Odunsi =

Nigerian politician

Senator for Ogun West
- In office May 2011 – May 2015
- Preceded by: Felix Kolawole Bajomo
- Succeeded by: Gbolahan Dada

Personal details
- Party: Action Congress of Nigeria (ACN)
- Education: CMS Grammar School, Bariga
- Alma mater: University of Lagos; University of Illinois

Akin Babalola Kamar Odunsi is a Nigerian businessman who was elected Senator for the Ogun West constituency of Ogun State, Nigeria in the April 2011 to May 2015 national elections. He ran on the Action Congress of Nigeria (ACN) platform.

== Background ==
Chief Kamardeen Akinola Babalola Odunsi (KABO) attended the CMS Grammar School, Bariga, then the University of Lagos where he obtained a BA degree in 1972. He went on to the University of Illinois, Urbana, Illinois, United States, graduating with an MS in advertising in July 1973. He worked with Vince Cullers Advertising in Chicago before returning to Nigeria in 1974 to join Grant Advertising, later moving to Admark Advertising where he became the first Nigerian Chief Executive in 1976.

In 1978 Odunsi co-founded Rosabel Advertising and was the agency's Managing Director until 1997 when he became the Executive Chairman.

He held various positions with the Association of Advertising Practitioners of Nigeria, becoming President of the association from 1989 to 1992.

Odunsi retired as Executive Chairman of Rosabel Leo Burnett in 2003.

== Political career ==
Odunsi was selected as the 2011 Action Congress of Nigeria (ACN) candidate for Ogun West Senatorial District.

He was aged about 60 when he ran for election.

He promised to revive projects to improve primary health care when elected, and to establish programs to encourage start-up businesses.

Odunsi polled 61,382 votes in the April 2011 elections, and was declared the winner. Runners up were Babatunde Fadun of the PDP with 59,949 votes and Waliu O. Taiwo of the PPN with 45,246 votes.

In December 2014, he was selected by the Social Democratic Party (SDP) to fly the parties flag in the 2015 gubernatorial elections for Ogun State, Nigeria.
