= Iyabo Obasanjo =

Nigerian politician (born 1967)

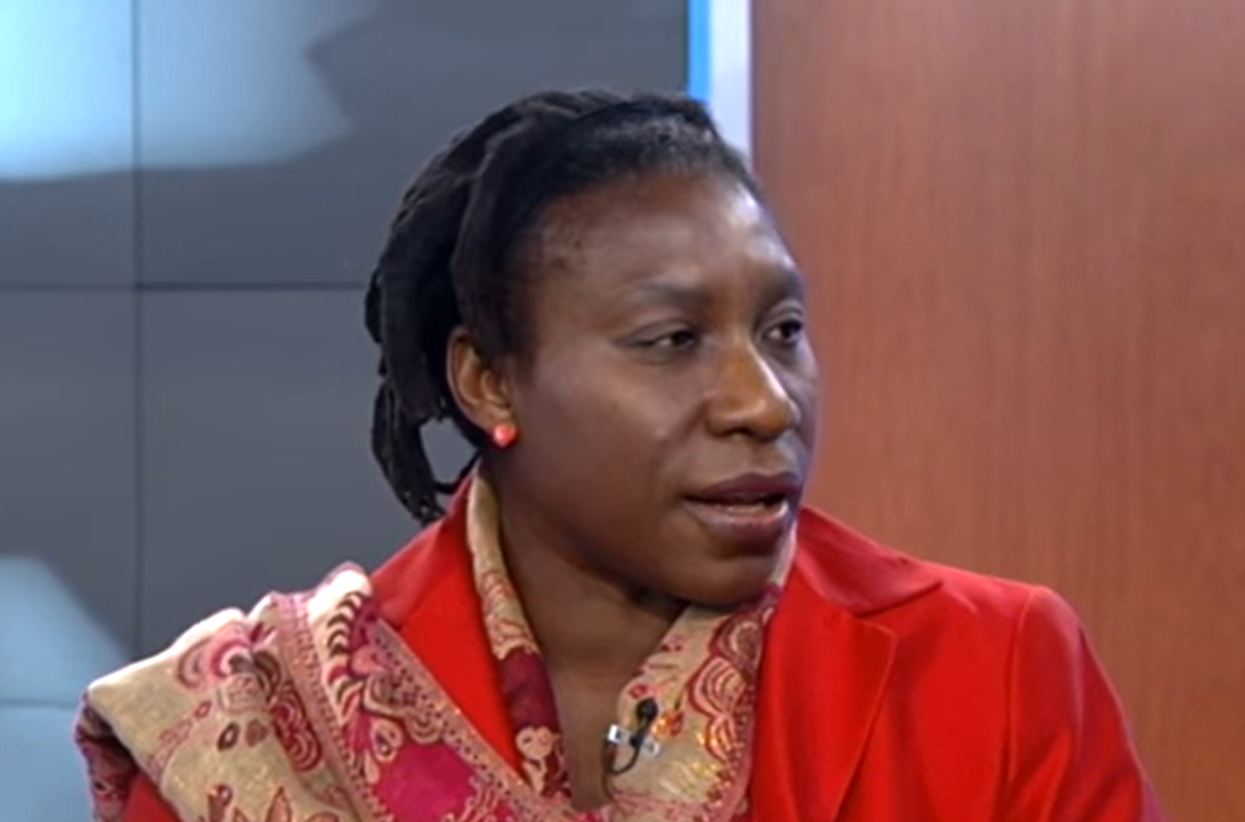
- Obasanjo in 2015

Senator for Ogun Central
- In office 5 June 2007 – 6 June 2011
- Preceded by: Ibikunle Amosun
- Succeeded by: Olugbenga Onaolapo Obadara

Personal details
- Born: 27 April 1967 (age 59) Lagos, Nigeria
- Party: Peoples Democratic Party
- Spouse: Oluwafolajimi Akeem Bello (m. 1999; div. 2003)
- Children: 1
- Parents: Olusegun Obasanjo (father); Oluremi Obasanjo (mother)
- Education: Queen's College, Lagos; University of Ibadan; University of California; Cornell University
- Profession: Politician; veterinarian; epidemiologist; academic

Iyabo Obasanjo (born 27 April 1967) is a Nigerian academic, epidemiologist, and former senator. She is the daughter of former president of Nigeria Olusegun Obasanjo and his wife Oluremi Obasanjo.

== Early life and education ==
Obasanjo attended Corona School in Victoria Island, Lagos, Capital School in Kaduna, and Queen's College in Lagos. She obtained a degree in veterinary medicine from the University of Ibadan in 1988, a master's degree in epidemiology from University of California, Davis in Davis, California, United States, in 1990, and a PhD in the same subject from Cornell University in Ithaca, New York, in 1994.

== Political career ==
Before her senatorial election, Obasanjo was Ogun State Commissioner for Health. She was elected as a Nigerian Senator representing Ogun Central Senatorial District of Ogun State in April 2007. She ran for re-election April 2011 on the PDP platform, but was defeated by Olugbenga Onaolapo Obadara of the Action Congress of Nigeria (ACN), who gained 102,389 votes to Obasanjo Bello's 56,312.

=== Senate career ===
Obasanjo was elected to the Senate on 28 April 2007 on a People's Democratic Party (PDP) platform; her Action Congress (AC) opponent Remilekun Bakare challenged this outcome, but the Ogun State Election Petition Tribunal upheld her victory.

She was the Chairman of the Senate's Health Committee, and a member of the Security & Intelligence, Land Transport, Science & Technology, Education, National Planning, and Inter-Parliamentary Committees. She lost her seat during the National Assembly Elections on 9 April 2011.

Her political reign finally came to a halt in 2015 when she was ‘crushed’ by Senator Gbenga Obadara who snatched the Ogun Central Senatorial district from her.

=== Assassination attempt ===
In April 2003, on the day of the general elections her car was shot at on Ifo Road in Ogun State. Although she was not in the car, 3 adults and 2 children in the car died. The perpetuators were never caught.

=== EFCC investigation ===
In April 2008, Obasanjo came under investigation by Nigeria's Economic and Financial Crimes Commission (EFCC) due to the investigations involving the former minister of health, Prof. Adenike Grange, and the minister of state for health, Gabriel Aduku, for the embezzlement of public funds. The ministry at the end of the financial year did not return all unspent funds to the government coffers. The amount was 300 million Naira, which was allegedly distributed among the minister, her minister of state and top civil servants on the Senate and House health committee she chairs. The minister and her deputy were forced to resign after returning their share of the money; they were later arrested and posted bail. Obasanjo refused to return her portion of this money, 10 million naira. She claimed that the nine members of her committee "lobbied" for funds from the ministry they oversaw. She maintained this money was spent on a conference on capacity building some members of the health committee attended in Ghana. She has so far refused to appear before the EFCC. Although summoned, along with the minister and other civil servants, she refused to appear in court. A week later a high drama ensued when officials of the EFCC tried to arrest her at her home in the Maitama district of Abuja city, after several simultaneous stake outs by law enforcement officials that had her jumping over her fence to evade arrest by Nigerian law enforcement officers. In 2009 the case was thrown out of the High Court in Abuja as having no merit.

Obasanjo described the allegation as "blackmail", and said she was being targeted because she was the daughter of the former president.

=== Post-senate career ===
In 2018, a letter from Obasanjo to her father in 2013 resurfaced following a statement sent by her father to President Muhammadu Buhari, which she blamed on supporters of the Buhari administration. She also urged the Buhari administration to heed her father's advice and not seek re-election.

== Academic career ==
She worked in Clinical Research in the US before returning to Nigeria in 2003. she was a Fellow and for 2013 a Senior Fellow at Harvard's Advanced Leadership Initiative. She is currently an assistant professor at the College of William & Mary Department of Health Sciences. Her noted works include:

- Olowonyo, MT; MA Adekanmbi and Iyabo Obasanjo-Bello (2004). "Findings on the Use of Antenatal Facilities in Ogun State". Nigerian Medical Practitioner. 45 (5): 68–71.
- Olowonyo, MT; S Oshin and Iyabo Obasanjo-Bello (2006). "Some factors associated with low birthweight in Ogun State, Nigeria". Nigerian Medical Practitioner. 49 (6): 154–157. doi:10.4314/nmp.v49i6.28823.

== Personal life ==
Obasanjo married Oluwafolajimi Akeem Bello in September 1999. The couple separated after Obasanjo filed for divorce on 19 May 2003. They both have one child; Jimi Bello born on 1 January 2000 in Chatham County, North Carolina.
