= Olugbenga Onaolapo Obadara =

Nigerian politician (born 1960)

Senator for Ogun Central
- In office 6 June 2011 – 6 June 2015
- Preceded by: Iyabo Obasanjo-Bello
- Succeeded by: Lanre Tejuosho

Personal details
- Born: 13 April 1960 (age 65)
- Party: Action Congress of Nigeria (ACN)
- Profession: Politician

Jeremiah Olugbenga Onaolapo Obadara (born 13 April 1960) is a Nigerian politician and chairman of Lucinda Media Limited (owners of Sweet 107.1 FM), Abeokuta, Nigeria, who served as senator for the Ogun Central constituency in Ogun State, Nigeria, from 2011 to 2015. He ran on the Action Congress of Nigeria (ACN) platform.

Obadara is the son of the first chairman of Odeda Local Government Area of Ogun State. He is of Yewa and Egba descent. He began work as a grade II teacher in Ota, but later entered the telecommunications business, becoming managing director of Imperial Communications. His company pioneered pre-paid call cards in Nigeria and introduced electronic directories.

In 2006, Obadara competed in the Action Congress of Nigeria party primaries for the 2007 senatorial elections, but did not win the nomination.

In the April 2011 elections, Obadara ran for election as Senator for Ogun Central and gained 102,389 votes, defeating incumbent Senator Iyabo Obasanjo Bello of the Peoples Democratic Party (PDP), who scored 56,312.
