= Funmi Tejuosho =

Nigerian politician

Hon. Funmi Tejuosho
- Born: Adefunmilayo Smith; 25 March 1965 (age 61); Lagos State, Nigeria
- Other name: Oloori Adefunmilayo Tejuosho
- Education: Queen's College, Lagos; West Virginia University; University of Buckingham; University of Lagos
- Occupations: lawyer; politician
- Years active: 1997–present
- Political party: All Progressives Congress
- Spouse: Omoba Kayode Tejuosho
- Children: 4

Adefunmilayo Tejuosho (née Smith) (born 25 March 1965) is a Nigerian politician who is a fourth term Lagos State House of Assembly legislator, representing Mushin Constituency I. She is the chairperson of the Lagos State House of Assembly Committee on Finance.

== Early life and education ==
Tejuosho was born in Lagos State to the family of Ademola Smith an epidemiologist who worked for the Nigerian government. She attended University of Lagos Staff School, Akoka, Queen's College, Lagos and completed her secondary education in West Virginia. After high school, she attended West Virginia University, where she studied Biology. She later earned a law degree from University of Buckingham. Tejuosho holds a Ph.D. in law from the University of Lagos.

== Career ==
During her youth service year, she was a teacher at her alma mater, Queens School, Yaba. After her call to the bar, she joined the services of Ademola Odunsi & Co. In 1996, she was a member of the Grassroot Democratic Movement under the short-lived Abacha administration and was a House of Representative candidate for the party before the democratic project was cancelled. At the beginning of the fourth republic, she joined Alliance for Democracy. In 2003, she was voted into the Lagos State House of Assembly to represent Mushin Constituency I. In the assembly, Tejuosho sponsored the bill that later became known as the Lagos State Protection Against Domestic Violence Law of 2007. The law grants protection orders to victims of domestic violence from their oppressors. She was inspired to write the draft of the bill by a paper on domestic violence she wrote for her LLM programme at University of Lagos.

She went on to hold various posts and positions in the House including Deputy Chief Whip, Deputy Speaker and Chairman, Lagos State House of Assembly Committee on Finance.

She was nominated as deputy speaker in 2007 but was impeached in 2009. Following her impeachment a series of investigations were conducted to ascertain the educational qualification of her successor and some of her accusers but the results of the allegations were not released.

== Personal life ==
She is married to Omoba Kayode Tejuosho of the Tejuosho royal family of Ogun State, Nigeria. Together they have four children.
