= 1999 Nigerian parliamentary election =

Parliamentary elections were held in Nigeria on 20 February 1999, following the annulling of the 1998 elections. The result was a victory for the People's Democratic Party, which won 59 of the 109 Senate seats and 206 of the 360 House seats. Voter turnout was 42.1%.

== Results ==
=== Senate ===
Party	Votes	%	Seats
People's Democratic Party			59
All People's Party			29
Alliance for Democracy			20
Vacant			1
Total			109
Total votes	24,386,247	–	
Registered voters/turnout	57,938,945	42.09	
Source: African Elections Database

==== Results by state ====
- Abia State
- Adamawa State
- Akwa Ibom State
- Anambra State
- Bauchi State
- Bayelsa State
- Benue State
- Borno State
- Cross River State
- Delta State
- Ebonyi State
- Edo State
- Ekiti State
- Enugu State
- Gombe State
- Imo State
- Jigawa State
- Kaduna State
- Kano State
- Katsina State
- Kebbi State
- Kogi State
- Kwara State
- Lagos State
- Nasarawa State
- Niger State
- Ogun State
- Ondo State
- Osun State
- Oyo State
- Plateau State
- Rivers State
- Sokoto State
- Taraba State
- Yobe State
- Zamfara State

=== House of Representatives ===
Party	Votes	%	Seats
People's Democratic Party			206
All People's Party			74
Alliance for Democracy			68
Vacant			12
Total			360
Total votes	23,573,407	–	
Registered voters/turnout	57,938,945	40.69	
Source: African Elections Database

==== Results by state ====
- Bayelsa State
- Federal Capital Territory
- Katsina State
- Kwara State
- Nasarawa State
- Taraba State
