= Nigerian National Assembly delegation from Ekiti =

Ekiti's delegation in Nigeria's National Assembly

The Nigerian National Assembly delegation from Ekiti comprises three Senators representing Ekiti North, Ekiti South, and Ekiti Central, and six Representatives representing Ekiti Central 1, Ekiti South 1, Ekiti South 2, Ekiti North 1, Ekiti North 2, and Ekiti Central 2.

== Fourth Republic ==
=== The 4th Parliament (1999–2003) ===
OFFICE	NAME	PARTY	CONSTITUENCY	TERM
Senator	Joseph Olatunji Ajayi	AD	Ekiti North	1999–2003
Senator	Gbenga Daniel Aluko	PDP	Ekiti South	1999–2003
Senator	Ayo Ade Oni	AD	Ekiti Central	1999–2003
Representative	Adedayo Fajuru Charles	AD	Ekiti Central 1	1999–2003
Representative	Ajayi Joseph Aderemi	AD	Ekiti South 1	1999–2003
Representative	Aladejebi Francis Oluyemi	AD	Ekiti South 2	1999–2003
Representative	Olusegun Raphael Ojo	AD	Ekiti North 1	1999–2003
Representative	Owoola Ogunsanmi	AD	Ekiti North 2	1999–2003
Representative	Ropo Ige	AD	Ekiti Central 2	1999–2003

=== 8th Assembly (2015–2019) ===
Senator	Party	Constituency
Fatimat Olufunke Raji-Rasaki	PDP	Ekiti Central
Abiodun Olujimi	PDP	Ekiti South
Duro Faseyi	PDP	Ekiti North
Representative	Party	Constituency
Thaddeus Aina	PDP	Ido/Osi, Moba/Ilejeme
Akinyede Awodumila	PDP	Emure/Gbonyin/Ekiti East
Kehinde Agboola	PDP	Ikole/Oye
Olamide Oni	PDP	Ijero/Ekiti West/Efon
Oladimeji Sunday	PDP	Ado Ekiti/Irepodun-Ifelodun
Segun Adekoka	PDP	Ekiti south west/Ikere/Ise/Orun

=== 9th Assembly (2019–2023) ===
Senator	Party	Constituency
Michael Opeyemi Bamidele	APC	Ekiti Central
Biodun Christine Olujimi	PDP	Ekiti South
Olubunmi Ayodeji Adetunmbi	APC	Ekiti North
Representative	Party	Constituency
Olanrewaju Ibrahim Kunle	APC	Ido/Osi, Moba/Ilejeme
Olufemi Richard Bamisile	APC	Emure/Gbonyin/Ekiti East
Kehinde Agboola	APC	Ikole/Oye
Ogunlola Omowumi Olubunmi	APC	Ijero/Ekiti West/Efon
Abdulraheem Olatunji Olawuyi	APC	Ado Ekiti/Irepodun-Ifelodun
Adaramodu Adeyemi Raphael	APC	Ekiti south west/Ikere/Ise/Orun
