= Nigerian National Assembly delegation from Delta =

Delta's delegation in Nigeria's National Assembly

The Nigerian National Assembly delegation from Delta comprises three Senators representing Delta Central, Delta South, Delta North and ten Representatives representing Ethiope, Ughelli North/South/Udu, Ndokwa/Ukwani, Okpe/Sapele/Uvwie, Isoko North/South, Burutu, Warri, Ika, Aniocha North/South, and Bomadi/Patani.

== Fourth Republic ==
=== The 9th Parliament (2019–2023) ===
OFFICE	NAME	PARTY	CONSTITUENCY	TERM
Senator	Ovie Omo-Agege	APC	Delta Central	2014–till date
Senator	James Manager	PDP	Delta South	2003–till date
Senator	Peter Onyeluka Nwaoboshi	APC	Delta North	2015–till date
Representative	Ben Rollands Igbakpa	PDP	Ethiope	2019–till date
Representative	Francis E. Waive	APC	Ughelli North/South/Udu	2019–till date
Representative	Ossai Ossai	PDP	Ndokwa/Ukwani	2011–till date
Representative	Efe Afe	PDP	Okpe/Sapele/Uvwie	2019–till date
Representative	Leo Ogor	PDP	Isoko North/South	2003–till date
Representative	Nicholas Mutu	PDP	Burutu	1999–till date
Representative	Thomas Ereyitomi	PDP	Warri	2019–till date
Representative	Victor Nwokolo	PDP	Ika	2011–till date
Representative	Ndudi Elumelu	PDP	Aniocha North/Aniocha South/Oshimili North/Oshimili South	2007–till date
Representative	Nicholas Ebomo Mutu	PDP	Bomadi/Patani	1999–till date

=== The 4th Parliament (1999–2003) ===
OFFICE	NAME	PARTY	CONSTITUENCY	TERM
Senator	Brume Fred Aghogho	PDP	Delta Central	1999–2003
Senator	Omu Stella	PDP	Delta South	1999–2003
Senator	Osakwe Patrick	PDP	Delta North	1999–2007
Representative	Agoda John Halim Ochuko	ANPP	Ethiope	1999–2003
Representative	Aguariavwodo Emmanuel Edesiri	ANPP	Ughelli North/South/Udu	1999–2003
Representative	Almona-Isei Mercy	PDP	Ndokwa/Ukwani	1999–2003
Representative	Dumi Gabriel M.	PDP	Opke/Sapele/Uvwie	1999–2003
Representative	Efekodha Anthony Onomuefe	PDP	Isoko North/South	1999–2003
Representative	Emibra Agbeotu Efiriaendi	ANPP	Burutu	1999–2003
Representative	Harriman Temi	ANPP	Warri	1999–2003
Representative	Irabor Nduka	PDP	Ika	1999–2003
Representative	Nwoko Ned Munir	PDP	Aniocha North/South	1999–2003
Representative	Nicholas Ebomo Mutu	PDP	Bomadi/Patani	1999–2003
