= 1999 Nigerian Senate elections in Ogun State =

1999 Nigerian Senate election in Ogun State

The 1999 Nigerian Senate election in Ogun State was held on February 20, 1999, to elect members of the Nigerian Senate to represent Ogun State. Afolabi Olabimtan representing Ogun West, Femi Okurounmu representing Ogun Central and Olabiyi Durojaiye representing Ogun East all won on the platform of the Alliance for Democracy.

== Overview ==
Affiliation	Party		Total
Affiliation	PDP	AD	Total
Before Election			3
After Election	0	3	3

== Summary ==
District	Incumbent	Party	Elected Senator	Party
Ogun West			Afolabi Olabimtan	AD
Ogun Central			Femi Okurounmu	AD
Ogun East			Olabiyi Durojaiye	AD

== Results ==
=== Ogun West ===
The election was won by Afolabi Olabimtan of the Alliance for Democracy.

1999 Nigerian Senate election in Ogun State
Party	Candidate	Votes	%
AD	Afolabi Olabimtan		
Total votes			
AD hold			

=== Ogun Central ===
The election was won by Femi Okurounmu of the Alliance for Democracy.

1999 Nigerian Senate election in Ogun State
Party	Candidate	Votes	%
AD	Femi Okurounmu		
Total votes			
AD hold			

=== Ogun East ===
The election was won by Olabiyi Durojaiye of the Alliance for Democracy.

1999 Nigerian Senate election in Ogun State
Party	Candidate	Votes	%
AD	Olabiyi Durojaiye		
Total votes			
AD hold			
