= 1999 Nigerian Senate elections in Rivers State =

20th century Nigerian senate elections

The 1999 Nigerian Senate election in Rivers State was held on February 20, 1999, to elect members of the Nigerian Senate to represent Rivers State. Ibiapuye Martyns-Yellowe representing Rivers West, Adawari Pepple representing Rivers South-East and John Azuta-Mbata representing Rivers East all won on the platform of the Peoples Democratic Party.

== Overview ==
Affiliation	Party		Total
Affiliation	PDP	AD	Total
Before Election			3
After Election	3	0	3

== Summary ==
District	Incumbent	Party	Elected Senator	Party
Rivers West			Ibiapuye Martyns-Yellowe	PDP
Rivers South-East			Adawari Pepple	PDP
Rivers East			John Azuta-Mbata	PDP

== Results ==
=== Rivers West ===
The election was won by Ibiapuye Martyns-Yellowe of the Peoples Democratic Party.

1999 Nigerian Senate election in Rivers State
Party	Candidate	Votes	%
PDP	Ibiapuye Martyns-Yellowe		
Total votes			
PDP hold			

=== Rivers South-East ===
The election was won by Adawari Pepple of the Peoples Democratic Party.

1999 Nigerian Senate election in Rivers State
Party	Candidate	Votes	%
PDP	Adawari Pepple		
Total votes			
PDP hold			

=== Rivers East ===
The election was won by John Azuta-Mbata of the Peoples Democratic Party.

1999 Nigerian Senate election in Rivers State
Party	Candidate	Votes	%
PDP	John Azuta-Mbata		
Total votes			
PDP hold			
