= List of members of the Senate of Nigeria from Rivers State =

This is a list of members of the Senate of Nigeria from Rivers State, Nigeria.

Senator	From	To	Party	Status
John Azuta-Mbata	1999	2007	PDP	Elected
Adawari Pepple	1999	2003	PDP	Elected
Ibiapuye Martyns-Yellowe	1999	2007	PDP	Elected
Lee Maeba	2003	2011	PDP	Elected
Wilson Ake	2007	2015	APC	Elected
George Sekibo	2007		PDP	Elected
Magnus Abe	2011	2015	APC	Elected
Osinakachukwu Ideozu	2015		PDP	Elected
Olaka Nwogu	2015		PDP	Elected

== See also ==
- Nigerian National Assembly delegation from Rivers State
- Elections in Rivers State
