= 1999 Nigerian Senate elections in Ekiti State =

1999 Nigerian Senate election in Ekiti State

The 1999 Nigerian Senate election in Ekiti State was held on February 20, 1999, to elect members of the Nigerian Senate to represent Ekiti State. Joseph Olatunji Ajayi representing Ekiti North and Ayo Oni representing Ekiti Central won on the platform of Alliance for Democracy, while Gbenga Aluko representing Ekiti South won on the platform of the Peoples Democratic Party.

== Overview ==
Affiliation	Party		Total
Affiliation	PDP	AD	Total
Before Election			3
After Election	1	2	3

== Summary ==
District	Incumbent	Party	Elected Senator	Party
Ekiti North			Joseph Olatunji Ajayi	AD
Ekiti Central			Ayo Oni	AD
Ekiti South			Gbenga Aluko	PDP

== Results ==
=== Ekiti North ===
The election was won by Joseph Olatunji Ajayi of the Alliance for Democracy.

1999 Nigerian Senate election in Ekiti State
Party	Candidate	Votes	%
AD	Joseph Olatunji Ajayi		
Total votes			
AD hold			

=== Ekiti Central ===
The election was won by Ayo Oni of the Alliance for Democracy.

1999 Nigerian Senate election in Ekiti State
Party	Candidate	Votes	%
AD	Ayo Oni		
Total votes			
AD hold			

=== Ekiti South ===
The election was won by Gbenga Aluko of the Peoples Democratic Party.

1999 Nigerian Senate election in Ekiti State
Party	Candidate	Votes	%
PDP	Gbenga Aluko		
Total votes			
PDP hold			
