= 1999 Nigerian Senate elections in Enugu State =

1999 Nigerian Senate election in Enugu State

The 1999 Nigerian Senate election in Enugu State was held on February 20, 1999, to elect members of the Nigerian Senate to represent Enugu State. Fidelis Okoro representing Enugu North won on the platform of Peoples Democratic Party, Jim Nwobodo representing Enugu East won on the platform of Alliance for Democracy, while Hyde Onuaguluchi representing Enugu West won on the platform of the All Nigeria Peoples Party.

== Overview ==
Affiliation	Party		Total
Affiliation	PDP	ANPP	Total
Before Election			3
After Election	1	1	3

== Summary ==
District	Incumbent	Party	Elected Senator	Party
Enugu North			Fidelis Okoro	PDP
Enugu East			Jim Nwobodo	AD
Enugu West			Hyde Onuaguluchi	ANPP

== Results ==
=== Enugu North ===
The election was won by Fidelis Okoro of the Peoples Democratic Party.

1999 Nigerian Senate election in Enugu State
Party	Candidate	Votes	%
PDP	Fidelis Okoro		
Total votes			
PDP hold			

=== Enugu East ===
The election was won by Jim Nwobodo of the Alliance for Democracy.

1999 Nigerian Senate election in Enugu State
Party	Candidate	Votes	%
AD	Jim Nwobodo		
Total votes			
AD hold			

=== Enugu West ===
The election was won by Hyde Onuaguluchi of the All Nigeria Peoples Party.

1999 Nigerian Senate election in Enugu State
Party	Candidate	Votes	%
ANPP	Hyde Onuaguluchi		
Total votes			
ANPP hold			
