= 1999 Nigerian Senate elections in Kano State =

The 1999 Nigerian Senate election in Kano State was held on February 20, 1999, to elect members of the Nigerian Senate to represent Kano State. Bello Hayatu Gwarzo representing Kano North, Masʽud El-Jibril representing Kano South, and Ibrahim Kura Mohammed representing Kano Central won on the platform of the Peoples Democratic Party.

== Overview ==
Affiliation	Party		Total
Affiliation	PDP	AD	Total
Before Election			3
After Election	3	0	3

== Summary ==
District	Incumbent	Party	Elected Senator	Party
Kano North			Bello Hayatu Gwarzo	PDP
Kano Central			Ibrahim Kura Mohammed	PDP
Kano South			Masʽud El-Jibril	PDP

== Results ==
=== Kano North ===
The election was won by Bello Hayatu Gwarzo of the Peoples Democratic Party.

1999 Nigerian Senate election in Kano State
Party	Candidate	Votes	%
PDP	Bello Hayatu Gwarzo		
Total votes			
PDP hold			

=== Kano Central ===
The election was won by Ibrahim Kura Mohammed of the Peoples Democratic Party.

1999 Nigerian Senate election in Kano State
Party	Candidate	Votes	%
PDP	Ibrahim Kura Mohammed		
Total votes			
PDP hold			

=== Kano South ===
The election was won by Masʽud El-Jibril of the Peoples Democratic Party.

1999 Nigerian Senate election in Kano State
Party	Candidate	Votes	%
PDP	Masʽud El-Jibril		
Total votes			
PDP hold			
