= 1999 Nigerian Senate elections in Bayelsa State =

1999 Nigerian Senate election in Bayelsa State

The 1999 Nigerian Senate election in Bayelsa State was held on February 20, 1999, to elect members of the Nigerian Senate to represent Bayelsa State. David Brigidi representing Bayelsa Central and Melford Okilo representing Bayelsa East won on the platform of Peoples Democratic Party, while Tupele-Ebi Diffa representing Bayelsa West won on the platform of the Alliance for Democracy.

== Overview ==
Affiliation	Party		Total
Affiliation	PDP	AD	Total
Before Election			3
After Election	2	1	3

== Summary ==
District	Incumbent	Party	Elected Senator	Party
Bayelsa Central			David Brigidi	PDP
Bayelsa East			Melford Okilo	PDP
Bayelsa West			Tupele-Ebi Diffa	AD

== Results ==
=== Bayelsa Central ===
The election was won by David Brigidi of the Peoples Democratic Party.

1999 Nigerian Senate election in Bayelsa State
Party	Candidate	Votes	%
PDP	David Brigidi		
Total votes			
PDP hold			

=== Bayelsa East ===
The election was won by Melford Okilo of the Peoples Democratic Party.

1999 Nigerian Senate election in Bayelsa State
Party	Candidate	Votes	%
PDP	Melford Okilo		
Total votes			
PDP hold			

=== Bayelsa West ===
The election was won by Tupele-Ebi Diffa of the Alliance for Democracy.

1999 Nigerian Senate election in Bayelsa State
Party	Candidate	Votes	%
AD	Tupele-Ebi Diffa		
Total votes			
AD hold			
