= 2003 Nigerian Senate elections in Ogun State =

2003 Nigerian Senate election in Ogun State

The 2003 Nigerian Senate election in Ogun State was held on April 12, 2003, to elect members of the Nigerian Senate to represent Ogun State. Ibikunle Amosun representing Ogun Central, Olatokunbo Ogunbanjo representing Ogun East and Iyabo Anisulowo representing Ogun West all won on the platform of the Peoples Democratic Party.

== Overview ==
Affiliation	Party		Total
Affiliation	PDP	AD	Total
Before Election			3
After Election	3	0	3

== Summary ==
District	Incumbent	Party	Elected Senator	Party
Ogun Central			Ibikunle Amosun	PDP
Ogun East			Olatokunbo Ogunbanjo	PDP
Ogun West			Iyabo Anisulowo	PDP

== Results ==
=== Ogun Central ===
The election was won by Ibikunle Amosun of the Peoples Democratic Party.

2003 Nigerian Senate election in Ogun State
Party	Candidate	Votes	%
PDP	Ibikunle Amosun		
Total votes			
PDP hold			

=== Ogun East ===
The election was won by Olatokunbo Ogunbanjo of the Peoples Democratic Party.

2003 Nigerian Senate election in Ogun State
Party	Candidate	Votes	%
PDP	Olatokunbo Ogunbanjo		
Total votes			
PDP hold			

=== Ogun West ===
The election was won by Iyabo Anisulowo of the Peoples Democratic Party.

2003 Nigerian Senate election in Ogun State
Party	Candidate	Votes	%
PDP	Iyabo Anisulowo		
Total votes			
PDP hold			
