= 1992 Nigerian Senate elections in Enugu State =

1992 Nigerian Senate election in Enugu State

The 1992 Nigerian Senate election in Enugu State was held on July 4, 1992, to elect members of the Nigerian Senate representing Enugu State. Ben-Collins Ndu (Enugu Central) and Fidelis Okoro (Enugu North) were elected on the platform of the National Republican Convention (NRC), while Polycarp Nwite (Enugu East) was elected on the platform of the Social Democratic Party (SDP).

== Overview ==
Affiliation	Party		Total
Affiliation	SDP	NRC	Total
Before Election			3
After Election	1	2	3

== Summary ==
District	Incumbent	Party	Elected Senator	Party
Enugu Central			Ben-Collins Ndu	NRC
Enugu North			Fidelis Okoro	NRC
Enugu East			Polycarp Nwite	SDP

== Results ==
=== Enugu Central ===
The election was won by Ben-Collins Ndu of the National Republican Convention.

1992 Nigerian Senate election in Enugu State
Party	Candidate	Votes	%
NRC	Ben-Collins Ndu		
Total votes			
NRC hold			

=== Enugu North ===
The election was won by Fidelis Okoro of the National Republican Convention.

1992 Nigerian Senate election in Enugu State
Party	Candidate	Votes	%
NRC	Fidelis Okoro		
Total votes			
NRC hold			

=== Enugu East ===
The election was won by Polycarp Nwite of the Social Democratic Party.

1992 Nigerian Senate election in Enugu State
Party	Candidate	Votes	%
SDP	Polycarp Nwite		
Total votes			
SDP hold			
