= Durojaiye =

Nigerian given name

- Gender: Male
- Language: Yoruba

Origin
- Origin: Yoruba
- Meaning: Wait/Stay and enjoy life.
- Region of origin: South-west Nigeria

Other names
- Variant forms: Dúrójayé; Dúró

Durojaiye is a Nigerian surname and given name of Yoruba origin. It is a combination of three Yoruba words: "duro" (meaning "wait, stay") "je" (meaning "eat, enjoy") aiye (meaning " life, earth, world,") Therefore the name means "wait/stay and enjoy life". Morphologically written as "dúró-jẹ-aiyé."

== Notable people with the surname ==
- Olumide Durojaiye (born 1992) Nigerian semi-professional footballer
- Olabiyi Durojaiye ( 1933 –2021) Nigerian politician
- Mary Durojaye –British basketball player
