= 2003 Nigerian Senate elections in Bayelsa State =

2003 Nigerian Senate election in Bayelsa State

The 2003 Nigerian Senate election in Bayelsa State was held on April 12, 2003, to elect members of the Nigerian Senate to represent Bayelsa State. John Kojo Brambaifa representing Bayelsa West, David Brigidi representing Bayelsa Central and Inatimi Rufus-Spiff representing Bayelsa East all won on the platform of the Peoples Democratic Party.

== Overview ==
Affiliation	Party		Total
Affiliation	PDP	AD	Total
Before Election			3
After Election	3	0	3

== Summary ==
District	Incumbent	Party	Elected Senator	Party
Bayelsa West			John Kojo Brambaifa	PDP
Bayelsa Central			David Brigidi	PDP
Bayelsa East			Inatimi Rufus-Spiff	PDP

== Results ==
=== Bayelsa West ===
The election was won by John Kojo Brambaifa of the Peoples Democratic Party.

2003 Nigerian Senate election in Bayelsa State
Party	Candidate	Votes	%
PDP	John Kojo Brambaifa		
Total votes			
PDP hold			

=== Bayelsa Central ===
The election was won by David Brigidi of the Peoples Democratic Party.

2003 Nigerian Senate election in Bayelsa State
Party	Candidate	Votes	%
PDP	David Brigidi		
Total votes			
PDP hold			

=== Bayelsa East ===
The election was won by Inatimi Rufus-Spiff of the Peoples Democratic Party.

2003 Nigerian Senate election in Bayelsa State
Party	Candidate	Votes	%
PDP	Inatimi Rufus-Spiff		
Total votes			
PDP hold			
