= 2003 Nigerian Senate elections in Enugu State =

2003 Nigerian Senate election in Enugu State

The 2003 Nigerian Senate election in Enugu State was held on April 12, 2003, to elect members of the Nigerian Senate to represent Enugu State. Ken Nnamani representing Enugu East, Ike Ekweremadu representing Enugu West and Fidelis Okoro representing Enugu North all won on the platform of the Peoples Democratic Party.

== Overview ==
Affiliation	Party		Total
Affiliation	PDP	AD	Total
Before Election			3
After Election	3	0	3

== Summary ==
District	Incumbent	Party	Elected Senator	Party
Enugu East			Ken Nnamani	PDP
Enugu West			Ike Ekweremadu	PDP
Enugu North			Fidelis Okoro	PDP

== Results ==
=== Enugu East ===
The election was won by Ken Nnamani of the Peoples Democratic Party.

2003 Nigerian Senate election in Enugu State
Party	Candidate	Votes	%
PDP	Ken Nnamani		
Total votes			
PDP hold			

=== Enugu West ===
The election was won by Ike Ekweremadu of the Peoples Democratic Party.

2003 Nigerian Senate election in Enugu State
Party	Candidate	Votes	%
PDP	Ike Ekweremadu		
Total votes			
PDP hold			

=== Enugu North ===
The election was won by Fidelis Okoro of the Peoples Democratic Party.

2003 Nigerian Senate election in Enugu State
Party	Candidate	Votes	%
PDP	Fidelis Okoro		
Total votes			
PDP hold			
