= Bob Nwannunu =

Nigerian Senator from 1999 to 2003

John Bob Nwannunu

Senator for Abia Central
- In office 29 May 1999 – 29 May 2003
- Succeeded by: Chris Adighije

Personal details
- Born: Abia State, Nigeria

John Bob Nwannunu // was elected Senator for the Abia Central constituency of Abia State, Nigeria at the start of the Nigerian Fourth Republic, running on the All People's Party (APP) platform. He took office on 29 May 1999.

After taking his seat in the Senate he was appointed to committees on Selection, Petroleum, Communication, Power & Steel and Agriculture. He was the deputy APP leader in the Senate. In January 2001, speaking of a proposed cabinet shakeup by President Olusegun Obasanjo, he said that Obasanjo's first ministerial team had failed to perform in office because they had their eyes on subsequent political careers.
