= 1999 Nigerian Senate elections in Delta State =

The 1999 Nigerian Senate election in Delta State was held on February 20, 1999, to elect members of the Nigerian Senate to represent Delta State. Patrick Osakwe representing Delta North, Fred Aghogho Brume representing Delta Central and Stella Omu representing Delta South all won on the platform of the Peoples Democratic Party.

== Overview ==
Affiliation	Party		Total
Affiliation	PDP	AD	Total
Before Election			3
After Election	3	0	3

== Summary ==
District	Incumbent	Party	Elected Senator	Party
Delta North			Patrick Osakwe	PDP
Delta Central			Fred Aghogho Brume	PDP
Delta South			Stella Omu	PDP

== Results ==
=== Delta North ===
The election was won by Patrick Osakwe of the Peoples Democratic Party.

1999 Nigerian Senate election in Delta State
Party	Candidate	Votes	%
PDP	Patrick Osakwe		
Total votes			
PDP hold			

=== Delta Central ===
The election was won by Fred Aghogho Brume of the Peoples Democratic Party.

1999 Nigerian Senate election in Delta State
Party	Candidate	Votes	%
PDP	Fred Aghogho Brume		
Total votes			
PDP hold			

=== Delta South ===
The election was won by Stella Omu of the Peoples Democratic Party.

1999 Nigerian Senate election in Delta State
Party	Candidate	Votes	%
PDP	Stella Omu		
Total votes			
PDP hold			
