= 2003 Nigerian Senate elections in Anambra State =

2003 Nigerian Senate election in Anambra State

The 2003 Nigerian Senate election in Anambra State was held on April 12, 2003, to elect members of the Nigerian Senate to represent Anambra State. Ugochukwu Uba representing Anambra South, Emmanuel Anosike representing Anambra North and Ikechukwu Abana representing Anambra Central all won on the platform of the Peoples Democratic Party.

== Overview ==
Affiliation	Party		Total
Affiliation	PDP	AD	Total
Before Election			3
After Election	3	0	3

== Summary ==
District	Incumbent	Party	Elected Senator	Party
Anambra South			Ugochukwu Uba	PDP
Anambra North			Emmanuel Anosike	PDP
Anambra Central			Ikechukwu Abana	PDP

== Results ==
=== Anambra South ===
The election was won by Ugochukwu Uba of the Peoples Democratic Party.

2003 Nigerian Senate election in Anambra State
Party	Candidate	Votes	%
PDP	Ugochukwu Uba		
Total votes			
PDP hold			

=== Anambra North ===
The election was won by Emmanuel Anosike of the Peoples Democratic Party.

2003 Nigerian Senate election in Anambra State
Party	Candidate	Votes	%
PDP	Emmanuel Anosike		
Total votes			
PDP hold			

=== Anambra Central ===
The election was won by Ikechukwu Abana of the Peoples Democratic Party.

2003 Nigerian Senate election in Anambra State
Party	Candidate	Votes	%
PDP	Ikechukwu Abana		
Total votes			
PDP hold			
