= 2003 Nigerian Senate elections in Ekiti State =

2003 Nigerian Senate election in Ekiti State

The 2003 Nigerian Senate election in Ekiti State was held on April 12, 2003, to elect members of the Nigerian Senate to represent Ekiti State. Clement Awoyelu representing Ekiti Central and Bode Olowoporoku representing Ekiti South won on the platform of Peoples Democratic Party, while James Kolawole representing Ekiti North won on the platform of the Alliance for Democracy.

== Overview ==
Affiliation	Party		Total
Affiliation	PDP	AD	Total
Before Election			3
After Election	2	1	3

== Summary ==
District	Incumbent	Party	Elected Senator	Party
Ekiti Central			Clement Awoyelu	PDP
Ekiti South			Bode Olowoporoku	PDP
Ekiti North			James Kolawole	AD

== Results ==
=== Ekiti Central ===
The election was won by Clement Awoyelu of the Peoples Democratic Party.

2003 Nigerian Senate election in Ekiti State
Party	Candidate	Votes	%
PDP	Clement Awoyelu		
Total votes			
PDP hold			

=== Ekiti South ===
The election was won by Bode Olowoporoku of the Peoples Democratic Party.

2003 Nigerian Senate election in Ekiti State
Party	Candidate	Votes	%
PDP	Bode Olowoporoku		
Total votes			
PDP hold			

=== Ekiti North ===
The election was won by James Kolawole of the Alliance for Democracy.

2003 Nigerian Senate election in Ekiti State
Party	Candidate	Votes	%
AD	James Kolawole		
Total votes			
AD hold			
