= Afolabi Olabimtan =

Nigerian politician

Senator for Ogun West
- In office 29 May 1999 – 29 May 2003
- Succeeded by: Iyabo Anisulowo

Personal details
- Born: 11 June 1932 Ogun State, Nigeria
- Died: 27 August 2003 (aged 71)

Afolabi Olabimtan (11 June 1932 – 27 August 2003) was a Nigerian politician, writer, and academic. He was born in Ogun State and was later the senator for Ogun West from 1999 to 2003. He died in a motor accident in August 2003.

Olabimtan achieved a PhD at the University of Lagos in African Languages. He became an expert in the Yoruba language, and wrote a number of novels in the tongue, such as Kekere Ekun in 1967 and Ayanmo in 1973.

In 1999, Olabimatan was elected as a senator for the Alliance for Democracy party for Ogun West. He served just one term, standing down in 2003 in order to allow a younger successor to take his place. Later in the same year he was killed in a motor accident.
