= Austin Opara =

Nigerian politician

Austin Adiele Opara OFR, (born 29 August 1963) is a Nigerian politician of the People's Democratic Party. He was raised in Diobu, Port Harcourt and is of the Ikwerre ethnic group.

== Education ==
Opara has a Higher National Diploma and a Bachelor of Science in Marketing option from the Rivers State University of Science and Technology. He obtained his Master of Business Administration, from the same institution. In addition, he is certified in Public Financial Management and Mastering Negotiations from John F. Kennedy School of Government in the United States. Austin Opara equally has a PhD degree in Political Marketing from Rivers State University, Rivers State, Nigeria.

== Early career ==
Opara started as a lecturer with the Rivers State School of Basic Studies and later as Head of Purchasing Department at Horicon Dredging Nigeria Limited, Port Harcourt.

== Political career ==
In 1999, he was elected to the House of Representatives, representing Port Harcourt II (federal constituency). He was reelected in 2003 and served as the deputy speaker until 2007. While at the Assembly, he served also as deputy chairman of National Assembly Joint Committee on the Review of the 1999 Constitution, sub-chairman of House Committee on the Nigerian National Petroleum Corporation, member of House Committee on Petroleum, deputy chairman of House Committee on the Niger Delta Development Commission and member, House Committee on National Security and intelligence.

In November 2015, Opara was appointed board chairman of the Rivers State Microfinance Agency.

== See also ==
- List of people from Rivers State
- List of Nigerian Senators from Rivers State
