= Femi Okurounmu =

Nigerian politician

Senator for Ogun Central
- In office 3 June 1999 – 3 June 2003
- Succeeded by: Ibikunle Amosun

Personal details
- Born: Ogun State, Nigeria
- Education: Harvard University; Massachusetts Institute of Technology

Femi Okurounmu was elected Senator for the Ogun Central constituency of Ogun State, Nigeria at the start of the Nigerian Fourth Republic, running on the Alliance for Democracy (AD) platform. He held office from 3 June 1999 to 3 June 2003.

Okurounmu was earlier Commissioner of the Ogun State Ministry of Works. After taking his seat in the Senate in 1999, Okurounmu was appointed to committees on Commerce and Economic Affairs. He ran for reelection in 2003, but was defeated by Alhaji Ibikunle Amosun of the People's Democratic Party (PDP) by 52,390 to 111,920 votes.

Okurounmu was appointed Secretary General of the Yoruba socio-political group, Afenifere. In January 2005 he was chairman of the logistics committee for a conference including Leaders of both the Afenifere and the Yoruba Council of Elders, who had been in dispute since 1999. During a February 2006 public hearing on amendments to the constitution which would allow President Olusegun Obasanjo to run for a third term, Okurounmu presented the position of the Afenifere faction led by Rueben Fasoranti, stating that the country should still maintain two terms of four years. He dissociated the Yoruba from Obasanjo's third term agenda, saying it was the work of the President and the PDP.

In July 2008, Okurounmu blamed the unrest in the southwest of Nigeria on the politics of self-aggrandizement and selfishness, where politicians seek power only to serve themselves. In January 2009 he said that Afenifere membership was open to all, regardless of political party affiliation, as long as they believe in the Afenifere and Awoist credo. In May 2010 he said that the zoning arrangement in the PDP by which presidents alternate between South and North every two terms was ridiculous, and supported the right of Goodluck Jonathan to seek reelection.

In January 2010, Okurounmu called Baba Ijo (father of the congregation) of St. Paul's Anglican Church, Sodubi, Abeokuta, had reportedly led a revolt of some of the church elders against the presiding Priest. Aggrieved youths sealed off the church gates to prevent worshipers attending the Sunday Service, threatening to lynch Okurounmu, and 15 police had to intervene to prevent the situation from becoming violent. On 1 October 2013, President Goodluck Jonathan appointed Femi Okurounmu the head of an advisory committee to prepare for a National Dialogue.
