= Fidelis Uchenna Okoro =

Nigerian poet, novelist, playwright, musician and film producer

- Citizenship: Nigeria
- Occupations: Poet, Novelist, Playwright, Musician, Film producer

Fidelis Uchenna Okoro (died 2021), also known as Fidoko, was a Nigerian poet, novelist, playwright, musician and film producer. As a faculty member of the University of Nigeria, he authored two novels, two poetry collections, and five plays. Additionally, he co-edited a poetry collection, released three albums, and produced four films.

== Education ==
Okoro graduated from the University of Nigeria in the 1990s.

== Career ==
=== Academic ===
Okoro joined the teaching staff of the University of Nigeria in May 1997. He was a senior lecturer in the Department of English and Literary Studies at the University of Nigeria.

He co-edited Africa and World Literature: University of Nigeria Journal of Literary Studies and was an editorial advisor for The Muse, the student journal at the University of Nigeria. In 2022, The Muse created the Fidelis Okoro Prize for Poetry, sponsored by Friday Romanus, in his honor.

Okoro was nominated by the University of Nigeria Staff Awards for the "Beat Dressed Lecturer (Male)" and the "Most Popular Lecturer (Male)".

=== Writing ===
Okoro authored two novels, two poetry collections, and five plays. He also co-edited Apples of Gold: A Pageant of Modern Nigerian Poems with Emeka Joseph Otagburuagu.

In 1998, Okoro published his first full-length work, a play entitled Wisdom of the Ostrich. He later published the plays Joys of War (2000), Prof Zemzi’s Last Rehearsal (2005), Quagmire (2010), and Preamble to Apocalypse (2016). Quagmire was the runner-up for the 2010 ANA/J.P. Clark Drama Prize. The same year, the book, Quagmire, was shortlisted for the NNDC Prize for Drama.

Okoro's third full-length publication was the novel The Rape of Regina (2002), which was followed by Cracking the Shell (2013). Cracking the Shell was shortlisted for the 2009 ANA/Jacaranda Prose Prize.

Okoro published his first poetry collection, When the Bleeding Heart Breaks, in 2006. The collection became the first runner-up for the 2006 ANA/Cadbury Poetry Prize. His second collection, Pimples and Dimples, was published in 2012 and was the first runner-up for the 2012 ANA/Gabriel Okara Poetry Prize.

=== Music ===
Okoro released three albums: One More Mile, Call on Me (2008), and Baby Kpurunu m Ishi.

=== Film ===
In 2006, Okoro founded Fidoko Films International. With the company, he produced and direct four films: Saved by Sin (2007), Peace of the Graveyard, Uzumagada: The Search for Inspiration, and Paradisico.

== Personal life ==
Fidelis Okoro was a devout Jehovah’s Witness. He died from leukemia on June 22, 2021.

== Filmography ==
- Saved by Sin (2007)
- Peace of the Graveyard
- Uzumagada: The Search for Inspiration
- Paradisico

== Publications ==
=== Novels ===
- The Rape of Regina. University of Nigeria Press. 2002. ISBN 978-978-2299-38-3.
- Cracking the Shell. Xlibris Corporation. 2013. ISBN 978-1-453-55222-3.

=== Poetry ===
- When the Bleeding Heart Breaks. El 'Demark Publishers. 2006. ISBN 978-9-788-06179-3.
- Pimples and Dimples. 2012.

=== Plays ===
- Wisdom of the Ostrich (1998)
- Joys of War. New Generation Books. 2000. ISBN 978-978-2900-51-7.
- Prof Zemzi’s Last Rehearsal (2005)
- Quagmire (2010)
