= Brimmo Yusuf =

Nigerian politician

Brimmo Yemi Yusuf

Senator for Oyo North
- In office May 1999 – May 2003
- Succeeded by: Robert Koleoso

Personal details
- Born: Oyo State, Nigeria

Brimmo Yemi Yusuf is a Nigerian politician. He was elected Senator for the Oyo North constituency of Oyo State, Nigeria at the start of the Nigerian Fourth Republic, running on the Alliance for Democracy (AD) platform. He took office on 29 May 1999.

Brimmo is a retired Brigadier General. He is an alumnus of Nigerian Institute for Policy and Strategic studies. He held various positions in the Army including Acting General Officer Commanding 82 division. From 1996 to 1999 he was a director of Odu’a Investment Company Limited. After taking his seat in the Senate in June 1999 he was appointed to committees on Internal Affairs, Security & Intelligence, Defense and Drug & Narcotics. During the term of the assembly, several senators switched from the AD to the ruling People's Democratic Party (PDP). Brimmo moved to the PDP in 2001, and in November 2002 was an aspirant to become Oyo State Governor on the PDP platform.

In November 2009 Brimmo was appointed Chairman of Odu’a Investment Company.
