= 1999 Nigerian Senate elections in Nasarawa State =

The 1999 Nigerian Senate election in Nasarawa State was held on February 20, 1999, to elect members of the Nigerian Senate to represent Nasarawa State. Patrick Aga representing Nasarawa North, Abubakar Sodangi representing Nasarawa West and Haruna Abubakar representing Nasarawa South all won on the platform of the Peoples Democratic Party.

== Overview ==
Affiliation	Party		Total
Affiliation	PDP	AD	Total
Before Election			3
After Election	3	0	3

== Summary ==
District	Incumbent	Party	Elected Senator	Party
Nasarawa North			Patrick Aga	PDP
Nasarawa West			Abubakar Sodangi	PDP
Nasarawa South			Haruna Abubakar	PDP

== Results ==
=== Nasarawa North ===
The election was won by Patrick Agaof the Peoples Democratic Party.

1999 Nigerian Senate election in Nasarawa State
Party	Candidate	Votes	%
PDP	Patrick Aga		
Total votes			
PDP hold			

=== Nasarawa West ===
The election was won by Abubakar Sodangi of the Peoples Democratic Party.

1999 Nigerian Senate election in Nasarawa State
Party	Candidate	Votes	%
PDP	Abubakar Sodangi		
Total votes			
PDP hold			

=== Nasarawa South ===
The election was won by Haruna Abubakarof the Peoples Democratic Party.

1999 Nigerian Senate election in Nasarawa State
Party	Candidate	Votes	%
PDP	Haruna Abubakar		
Total votes			
PDP hold			
