= 1992 Nigerian Senate elections in Borno State =

1992 Nigerian Senate election in Borno State

The 1992 Nigerian Senate election in Borno State was held on July 4, 1992, to elect members of the Nigerian Senate to represent Borno State. Abubakar Mahdi representing Borno South and Hassan Abba Sadiq representing Borno North won on the platform of Social Democratic Party, while Ali Modu Sheriff representing Borno Central won on the platform of the National Republican Convention.

== Overview ==
Affiliation	Party		Total
Affiliation	SDP	NRC	Total
Before Election			3
After Election	2	1	3

== Summary ==
District	Incumbent	Party	Elected Senator	Party
Borno South			Abubakar Mahdi	SDP
Borno North			Hassan Abba Sadiq	SDP
Borno Central			Ali Modu Sheriff	NRC

== Results ==
=== Borno South ===
The election was won by Abubakar Mahdi of the Social Democratic Party.

1992 Nigerian Senate election in Borno State
Party	Candidate	Votes	%
SDP	Abubakar Mahdi		
Total votes			
SDP hold			

=== Borno North ===
The election was won by Hassan Abba Sadiq of the Social Democratic Party.

1992 Nigerian Senate election in Borno State
Party	Candidate	Votes	%
SDP	Hassan Abba Sadiq		
Total votes			
SDP hold			

=== Borno Central ===
The election was won by Ali Modu Sheriff of the National Republican Convention.

1992 Nigerian Senate election in Borno State
Party	Candidate	Votes	%
NRC	Ali Modu Sheriff		
Total votes			
NRC hold			
