= Tupele-Ebi Diffa =

Nigerian politician

Emmanuel W Tupele-Ebi Diffa

Senator for Bayelsa West
- In office 29 May 1999 – 29 May 2003
- Succeeded by: John Brambaifa

Personal details
- Born: Sagbama LGA, Bayelsa State, Nigeria

Emmanuel W Tupele-Ebi Diffa was elected Senator for the Bayelsa West constituency of Bayelsa State, Nigeria at the start of the Nigerian Fourth Republic, running on the Alliance for Democracy (AD) platform. He took office on 29 May 1999.

After taking his seat in the Senate in June 1999 he was appointed to committees on Petroleum, Environment, Niger Delta and Social Development & Sports. He was appointed deputy whip for the AD in the Senate. In December 2002 there were rumors that Diffa was planning to seek reelection on the People's Democratic Party (PDP) platform, without first formally leaving the AD.
