= Ejiroghene =

- Gender: Unisex
- Language: Urhobo

Origin
- Language: Urhobo
- Meaning: God has done it

Ejiroghene is a given name or surname from the Urhobo ethnic group in Delta State, Nigeria. The name is originated from Urhobo which means "God has done it". Notable people with the given name include:

- Francis Ejiroghene Waive (born 1966), Nigerian priest and politician
- Josephine Ejiroghene Oniyama (born 1983), English singer-songwriter
