= 1999 Nigerian Senate elections in Ebonyi State =

The 1999 Nigerian Senate elections in Ebonyi State was held on February 20, 1999, to elect members of the Nigerian Senate to represent Ebonyi State. Sylvanus Ngele representing Ebonyi North, Obasi Osulor representing Ebonyi Central and Anyim Pius Anyim representing Ebonyi South all won on the platform of the Peoples Democratic Party.

== Overview ==
Affiliation	Party		Total
Affiliation	PDP	AD	Total
Before Election			3
After Election	3	0	3

== Summary ==
District	Incumbent	Party	Elected Senator	Party
Ebonyi North			Sylvanus Ngele	PDP
Ebonyi Central			Obasi Osulor	PDP
Ebonyi South			Anyim Pius Anyim	PDP

== Results ==
=== Ebonyi North ===
The election was won by Sylvanus Ngele of the Peoples Democratic Party.

1999 Nigerian Senate election in Ebonyi State
Party	Candidate	Votes	%
PDP	Sylvanus Ngele		
Total votes			
PDP hold			

=== Ebonyi Central ===
The election was won by Obasi Osulor of the Peoples Democratic Party.

1999 Nigerian Senate election in Ebonyi State
Party	Candidate	Votes	%
PDP	Obasi Osulor		
Total votes			
PDP hold			

=== Ebonyi South ===
The election was won by Anyim Pius Anyim of the Peoples Democratic Party.

1999 Nigerian Senate election in Ebonyi State
Party	Candidate	Votes	%
PDP	Anyim Pius Anyim		
Total votes			
PDP hold			
