= Patrick Aga =

Nigerian politician

Senator for Nasarawa North
- In office May 1999 – May 2003
- Succeeded by: John Danboyi

Personal details
- Born: Nasarawa State, Nigeria
- Political party: Peoples Democratic Party (PDP)

Patrick Aga was elected Senator for the Nasarawa North constituency of Nasarawa State, Nigeria at the start of the Fourth Nigerian Republic, running on the Peoples Democratic Party (PDP) platform. He took office on May 29 1999.

After taking his seat in the Senate in June 1999, he was appointed to committees on Ethics, Judiciary, Women Affairs, Commerce, Education, Special Projects and Local & Foreign Debts (vice chairman).

In the run-up to the 2003 elections, Aga transferred to the Alliance for Democracy (AD) party in the hope of being elected Nasarawa governor on that platform.

After the elections the AD party split into two rival factions.

In December 2003 Aga was appointed national vice chairman for the North-Central region in the faction headed by Chief Adebisi Akande.
