= 1999 Nigerian Senate elections in Oyo State =

1999 Nigerian Senate election in Oyo State

The 1999 Nigerian Senate election in Oyo State was held on February 20, 1999, to elect members of the Nigerian Senate to represent Oyo State. Brimmo Yusuf representing Oyo North, Lekan Balogun representing Oyo Central and Peter Olawuyi representing Oyo South all won on the platform of the Alliance for Democracy.

== Overview ==
| Affiliation | Party | | Total |
| Affiliation | PDP | AD | Total |
|---|---|---|---|
| Before Election | | | 3 |
| After Election | 0 | 3 | 3 |

== Summary ==
| District | Incumbent | Party | Elected Senator | Party |
|---|---|---|---|---|
| Oyo North | | | Brimmo Yusuf | AD |
| Oyo Central | | | Lekan Balogun | AD |
| Oyo South | | | Peter Olawuyi | AD |

== Results ==
=== Oyo North ===
The election was won by Brimmo Yusuf of the Alliance for Democracy.

1999 Nigerian Senate election in Oyo State
| Party | Candidate | Votes | % |
|---|---|---|---|
| AD | Brimmo Yusuf | | |
| Total votes | | | |
| AD hold | | | |

=== Oyo Central ===
The election was won by Lekan Balogun of the Alliance for Democracy.

1999 Nigerian Senate election in Oyo State
| Party | Candidate | Votes | % |
|---|---|---|---|
| AD | Lekan Balogun | | |
| Total votes | | | |
| AD hold | | | |

=== Oyo South ===
The election was won by Peter Olawuyi of the Alliance for Democracy.

1999 Nigerian Senate election in Oyo State
| Party | Candidate | Votes | % |
|---|---|---|---|
| AD | Peter Olawuyi | | |
| Total votes | | | |
| AD hold | | | |
