= 2003 Nigerian Senate elections in Kano State =

2003 Nigerian Senate election in Kano State

The 2003 Nigerian Senate election in Kano State was held on April 12, 2003, to elect members of the Nigerian Senate to represent Kano State. Bello Hayatu Gwarzo representing Kano North and Usman Umar Kibiya representing Kano South won on the platform of All Nigeria Peoples Party, while Rufai sani Hanga representing Kano Central won on the platform of the Peoples Democratic Party.

== Overview ==
| Affiliation | Party | | Total |
| Affiliation | PDP | ANPP | Total |
|---|---|---|---|
| Before Election | | | 3 |
| After Election | 1 | 2 | 3 |

== Summary ==
| District | Incumbent | Party | Elected Senator | Party |
|---|---|---|---|---|
| Kano North | | | Bello Hayatu Gwarzo | ANPP |
| Kano South | | | Usman Umar Kibiya | ANPP |
| Kano Central | | | Rufai Sani Hanga | PDP |

== Results ==
=== Kano North ===
The election was won by Bello Hayatu Gwarzo of the All Nigeria Peoples Party.

2003 Nigerian Senate election in Kano State
| Party | Candidate | Votes | % |
|---|---|---|---|
| ANPP | Bello Hayatu Gwarzo | | |
| Total votes | | | |
| ANPP hold | | | |

=== Kano South ===
The election was won by Usman Umar Kibiya of the All Nigeria Peoples Party.

2003 Nigerian Senate election in Kano State
| Party | Candidate | Votes | % |
|---|---|---|---|
| ANPP | Usman Umar Kibiya | | |
| Total votes | | | |
| ANPP hold | | | |

=== Kano Central ===
The election was won by Rufaisanbi Hanga of the Peoples Democratic Party.

2003 Nigerian Senate election in Kano State
| Party | Candidate | Votes | % |
|---|---|---|---|
| PDP | Rufaisanbi Hanga | | |
| Total votes | | | |
| PDP hold | | | |
