= Hyde Onuaguluchi =

Nigerian politician

Hyde Udeze Onuaguluchi
- Born: 1948 (age 77–78); Ihe Achi, Enugu State, Nigeria
- Other names: Brother
- Occupations: Pastor and Politician
- Children: 7

Hyde Udeze Onuaguluchi is the founder of God's Sabbath Mission, also was an elected Senator for the Enugu West constituency of Enugu State, Nigeria at the start of the Nigerian Fourth Republic.

== Personal life ==
Hyde Udeze Onuaguluchi hails from Achi Oji River Local Government Area of Enugu State. He has been involved in many projects like politics, religion law but most people may associate Hyde with Hydrotech - an engineering firm owned by him which has given millions of people fresh drinking water free of charge in the entire Eastern State. Hyde's commitment to the service and welfare of people made him a household name in many parts of Igboland.

== Education ==
- Pacific Slates University USA ( European Executive Programme) Diploma Development Studies
- MBA (International Business)
- Cornerstone University of the State of Hawaii D. Lit ( Honoris Causa) 1990
- University of Buckingham. UK LLB Hons and LLM (with merit) International Commercial Laws
- Nigerian Law School Abuja (BL)
- University of Nigeria Enugu Campus. Ph.D. Merchant Shipping Laws

== Political career ==
Running on the All People's Party (APP) platform. He took office on 29 May 1999. His opponent, Chief Ben-Collins Ndu of the PDP, filed an election petition with the Election Tribunal on the basis that the figures were falsified and there were gross irregularities and conduct during the election in the Awgu and Aninri local governments. In March 2001, after a protracted legal battle, the Supreme Court annulled Onuaguluchi's election and ordered new elections. Ndu went on to be elected.

Onuaguluchi was Chairman of the Governing Council of the Institute of Management and Technology, Enugu, from 2004 to 2009.
