= 1999 Nigerian Senate elections in Anambra State =

The 1999 Nigerian Senate election in Anambra State was held on February 20, 1999, to elect members of the Nigerian Senate to represent Anambra State. Nnamdi Eriobuna representing Anambra South, Chuba Okadigbo representing Anambra North and Michael Ajegbo representing Anambra Central all won on the platform of the Peoples Democratic Party.

== Overview ==
Affiliation	Party		Total
Affiliation	PDP	AD	Total
Before Election			3
After Election	3	0	3

== Summary ==
District	Incumbent	Party	Elected Senator	Party
Anambra South			Nnamdi Eriobuna	PDP
Anambra North			Chuba Okadigbo	PDP
Anambra Central			Michael Ajegbo	PDP

== Results ==
=== Anambra South ===
The election was won by Nnamdi Eriobuna of the Peoples Democratic Party.

2003 Nigerian Senate election in Anambra State
Party	Candidate	Votes	%
PDP	Nnamdi Eriobuna		
Total votes			
PDP hold			

=== Anambra North ===
The election was won by Chuba Okadigbo of the Peoples Democratic Party.

2003 Nigerian Senate election in Anambra State
Party	Candidate	Votes	%
PDP	Chuba Okadigbo		
Total votes			
PDP hold			

=== Anambra Central ===
The election was won by Michael Ajegbo of the Peoples Democratic Party.

2003 Nigerian Senate election in Anambra State
Party	Candidate	Votes	%
PDP	Michael Ajegbo		
Total votes			
PDP hold			
