= 1999 Nigerian Senate elections in Benue State =

The 1999 Nigerian Senate election in Benue State was held on February 20, 1999, to elect members of the Nigerian Senate to represent Benue State. David Mark representing Benue South, Joseph Waku representing Benue North-West, and Daniel Saror representing Benue North-East all won on the platform of the Peoples Democratic Party.

== Overview ==
Affiliation	Party		Total
Affiliation	PDP	ANPP	Total
Before Election			3
After Election	3	0	3

== Summary ==
District	Incumbent	Party	Elected Senator	Party
Benue South			David Mark	PDP
Benue North-West			Joseph Waku	PDP
Benue North-East			Daniel Saror	PDP

== Results ==
=== Benue South ===
The election was won by David Mark of the Peoples Democratic Party.

1999 Nigerian Senate election in Benue State
Party	Candidate	Votes	%
PDP	David Mark		
Total votes			
PDP hold			

=== Benue North-West ===
The election was won by Joseph Waku of the Peoples Democratic Party.

1999 Nigerian Senate election in Benue State
Party	Candidate	Votes	%
PDP	Joseph Waku		
Total votes			
PDP hold			

=== Benue North-East ===
The election was won by Daniel Saror of the People's Democratic Party.

1999 Nigerian Senate election in Benue State
Party	Candidate	Votes	%
PDP	Daniel Saror		
Total votes			
PDP hold			
