= 1999 Nigerian House of Representatives elections in Nasarawa State =

The 1999 Nigerian House of Representatives elections in Nasarawa State was held on February 20, 1999, to elect members of the House of Representatives to represent Nasarawa State, Nigeria.

== Overview ==
Affiliation	Party		Total
Affiliation	APP	PDP	Total
Before Election	-	-	5
After Election	-	5	5

== Summary ==
District	Party	Elected Reps Member	Party
Nasarawa/Toto		Samuel Egya	PDP
Lafia/Obi		Yusuf Suleiman	PDP
Keffi/Karu/Kokona		Salisu M. Raji	PDP
Awe/Doma/Keana		Musa Elayo	PDP
Akwanga/Nasarawa/Eggon/Wamba		Idris Yahaya Yakubu	PDP

== Results ==
=== Nasarawa/Toto ===
PDP candidate Samuel Egya won the election, defeating other party candidates.

1999 Nigerian House of Representatives election in Nasarawa State
Party	Candidate	Votes	%
PDP	Samuel Egya		
PDP hold			

=== Lafia/Obi ===
PDP candidate Yusuf Suleiman won the election, defeating other party candidates.

1999 Nigerian House of Representatives election in Nasarawa State
Party	Candidate	Votes	%
PDP	Yusuf Suleiman		
PDP hold			

=== Keffi/Karu/Kokona ===
PDP candidate Salisu M. Raji won the election, defeating other party candidates.

1999 Nigerian House of Representatives election in Nasarawa State
Party	Candidate	Votes	%
PDP	Salisu M. Raji		
PDP hold			

=== Awe/Doma/Keana ===
PDP candidate Musa Elayo won the election, defeating other party candidates.

1999 Nigerian House of Representatives election in Nasarawa State
Party	Candidate	Votes	%
PDP	Musa Elayo		
PDP hold			

=== Akwanga/Nasarawa/Eggon/Wamba ===
PDP candidate Idris Yahaya Yakubu won the election, defeating other party candidates.

1999 Nigerian House of Representatives election in Nasarawa State
Party	Candidate	Votes	%
PDP	Idris Yahaya Yakubu		
PDP hold			
