= Ibrahim Kura Mohammed =

Nigerian politician

Senator for Kano Central
- In office 29 May 1999 – 29 May 2003
- Succeeded by: Rufaisanbi Hanga

Personal details
- Born: Kano State, Nigeria
- Died: 6 May 2009

Ibrahim Kura Mohammed was elected Senator for the Kano central senatorial district of Kano State, Nigeria at the start of the Nigerian Fourth Republic, running on the People's Democratic Party (PDP) platform. He took office on 29 May 1999.

Kura Mohammed attended New York University in the USA where he earned a degree in political science in 1970. He was first Secretary in the Nigerian High Commission, Addis Ababa, Ethiopia (1972–1973), Executive Secretary of the Permanent Mission of Nigeria to the United Nations (1974–1976), Director of the Nigeria Tourist Association (1978–1979) and Chairman of Federal Polytechnic, Ilaro (1979–1983).

After taking his seat in the Senate Kura was appointed to committees on Solid Minerals, Communications, State & Local Government, Federal Character and Information. He decided not to seek reelection in 2003.

After leaving office he became a director of First Fund, a subsidiary of First Bank of Nigeria, chairman of Spotless Apt and director / vice chairman of Clearline International. He became chairman of Expatcare Health Services in January 2007. In late 2007 he became FCT Chairman of the campaign organisation for former Ebonyi governor Sam Egwu, who was running for chairman of the PDP. Speaking in January 2008 he expressed confidence that Egwu would take his seat at the next party convention. He died aged 65 on 6 May 2009 in Abuja and was buried in Kano.
