= Masʽud El-Jibril =

Nigerian politician

Masʽud Doguwa El-Jibril

Senator for Kano South
- In office 29 May 1999 – 29 May 2003
- Succeeded by: Usman Umar Kibiya

Personal details
- Born: Kano State, Nigeria

Masʽud Doguwa El-Jibril was elected Senator for the Kano South constituency of Kano State, Nigeria at the start of the Nigerian Fourth Republic, running on the People's Democratic Party (PDP) platform. He took office on 29 May 1999. After taking his seat in the Senate in June 1999 he was appointed to committees on Industries, Foreign Affairs, Works & Housing, Agriculture (Chairman) and Information.

In November 2005 Jibril emerged as chairman of a PDP faction called the "People's PDP", headed by PDP Board of Trustees member Alhaji Abubakar Muhammad Rimi, which was organizing meetings across the country. John Odey, the PDP national publicity secretary, said that the new association had no legal right to hold a congress since it was only an association. As chairman of the Kano State People's Democratic Party, in April 2006 Jibril accused the All Nigeria People's Party (ANPP) of orchestrating violence during a recent visit of President Olusegun Obasanjo to the state. The ANPP replied by blaming the clashes on PDP thugs.
