= 1999 Nigerian House of Representatives elections in Taraba State =

The 1999 Nigerian House of Representatives elections in Taraba State was held on February 20, 1999, to elect members of the House of Representatives to represent Taraba State, Nigeria.

== Overview ==
Affiliation	Party		Total
Affiliation	APP	PDP	Total
Before Election	-	-	6
After Election	1	5	6

== Summary ==
District	Party	Elected Reps Member	Party
Bali/Gassol		Dahiru Bako Gassol	PDP
Jalingo/Yorro/Zing		Alhassan Al-Gaddas	PDP
Karim Lamido/Lau/Ardo-Kola		Tauru T. Hanin	PDP
Sardauna/Gashaka/Kurmi		Kuriya Tafarki Auta	PDP
Takuma/Donga/Ussa		Abdulaziz Tanko	APP
Wukari/Ibi		Dantani Sunsuwa	PDP

== Results ==
=== Bali/Gassol ===
PDP candidate Dahiru Bako Gassol won the election, defeating other party candidates.

1999 Nigerian House of Representatives election in Taraba State
Party	Candidate	Votes	%
PDP	Dahiru Bako Gassol		
PDP hold			

=== Jalingo/Yorro/Zing ===
PDP candidate Alhassan Al-Gaddas won the election, defeating other party candidates.

1999 Nigerian House of Representatives election in Taraba State
Party	Candidate	Votes	%
PDP	Alhassan Al-Gaddas		
PDP hold			

=== Karim Lamido/Lau/Ardo-Kola ===
PDP candidate Tauru T. Hanin won the election, defeating other party candidates.

1999 Nigerian House of Representatives election in Taraba State
Party	Candidate	Votes	%
PDP	Tauru T. Hanin		
PDP hold			

=== Sardauna/Gashaka/Kurmi ===
PDP candidate Kuriya Tafarki Auta won the election, defeating other party candidates.

1999 Nigerian House of Representatives election in Taraba State
Party	Candidate	Votes	%
PDP	Kuriya Tafarki Auta		
PDP hold			

=== Takuma/Donga/Ussa ===
APP candidate Abdulaziz Tanko won the election, defeating other party candidates.

1999 Nigerian House of Representatives election in Taraba State
Party	Candidate	Votes	%
APP	Abdulaziz Tanko		
APP hold			

=== Wukari/Ibi ===
PDP candidate Dantani Sunsuwa won the election, defeating other party candidates.

1999 Nigerian House of Representatives election in Taraba State
Party	Candidate	Votes	%
PDP	Dantani Sunsuwa		
PDP hold			
