= 1999 Nigerian House of Representatives elections in Bayelsa State =

The 1999 Nigerian House of Representatives elections in Bayelsa State was held on February 20, 1999, to elect members of the House of Representatives to represent Bayelsa State, Nigeria.

== Overview ==
| Affiliation | Party | | Total |
| Affiliation | AD | PDP | Total |
|---|---|---|---|
| Before Election | - | - | 5 |
| After Election | 1 | 4 | 5 |

== Summary ==
| District | Party | Elected Reps Member | Party |
|---|---|---|---|
| Brass/Nembe | | Dieworio W. Wuku | PDP |
| Ogbia | | Edeni Mary E. | PDP |
| Sagbama/Ekeremor | | Clement Amlie | AD |
| Southern Ijaw | | Foter Okoto | PDP |
| Yenagoa/Kolokuna/Opokuma | | Mike Epengale | PDP |

== Results ==
=== Brass/Nembe ===
PDP candidate Dieworio W. Wuku won the election, defeating other party candidates.

1999 Nigerian House of Representatives election in Bayelsa State
| Party | Candidate | Votes | % |
|---|---|---|---|
| PDP | Dieworio W. Wuku | | |
| PDP hold | | | |

=== Ogbia ===
PDP candidate Edeni Mary E. won the election, defeating other party candidates.

1999 Nigerian House of Representatives election in Bayelsa State
| Party | Candidate | Votes | % |
|---|---|---|---|
| PDP | Edeni Mary E. | | |
| PDP hold | | | |

=== Sagbama/Ekeremor ===
AD candidate Clement Amlie won the election, defeating other party candidates.

1999 Nigerian House of Representatives election in Bayelsa State
| Party | Candidate | Votes | % |
|---|---|---|---|
| AD | Clement Amlie | | |
| AD hold | | | |

=== Southern Ijaw ===
PDP candidate Foter Okoto won the election, defeating other party candidates.

1999 Nigerian House of Representatives election in Bayelsa State
| Party | Candidate | Votes | % |
|---|---|---|---|
| PDP | Foter Okoto | | |
| PDP hold | | | |

=== Yenagoa/Kolokuna/Opokuma ===
PDP candidate Mike Epengale won the election, defeating other party candidates.

1999 Nigerian House of Representatives election in Bayelsa State
| Party | Candidate | Votes | % |
|---|---|---|---|
| PDP | Mike Epengale | | |
| PDP hold | | | |
