= Fred Aghogho Brume =

Nigerian Senator

Fred Ayo Aghogho Brume

Senator of the Federal Republic of Nigeria from Delta Central Senatorial District
- In office 29 May 1999 – 29 May 2003
- Succeeded by: Felix Ibru

Personal details
- Born: 25 September 1942 Delta State, Nigeria
- Died: 12 September 2011 (aged 68)

Fred Aghogho Brume (Fred A. Brume, Fred Brume) (25 September 1942 – 12 September 2011) was a Nigerian politician. He was elected Senator for the Delta Central Senatorial District of Delta State, Nigeria at the start of the Nigerian Fourth Republic, running on the People's Democratic Party (PDP) platform. He took office on 29 May 1999.

== Educational history and background ==
Brume was exceedingly bright, inducted into the oldest engineering honor society, Tau Beta Pi, as a junior at University of Maine in 1963. He obtained a Chemical Engineering degree from University of Maine in 1965 and a post-graduate degree in Industrial Management from the Sloan School, Massachusetts Institute of Technology (M.I.T) in 1967. Brume joined the World Bank in the fall of 1967 and was an officer of the World Bank until 1969.

His background was in engineering and industrial management, where he held various executive positions. He established the Delta Steel Company as the first general manager and CEO in the 1980s, although his work was curtailed under the regime of General Muhammadu Buhari following a military coup in 1983.

== Senate career ==
After taking his seat in the Senate in June 1999 Brume founded and became president of the Urhobo Leadership Forum in Abuja. He was appointed to committees on Science & Technology, Establishment, Niger Delta (chairman), Privatization, Tourism & Culture and Economic Affairs. In February 2001, after a reshuffle of the Senate committees Brume became chairman of the Steel committee. He lost this position in another reshuffle in October 2002, apparently because he opposed moves by Senate President Anyim Pius Anyim to impeach President Olusegun Obasanjo. Brume had accused supporters of impeachment of evil intentions for the country, saying they were not comfortable with having a Southerner as president. He said the move would truncate democracy in Nigeria if it succeeded.

As a Senator he was instrumental in establishing the Niger Delta Development Commission, gained approval for establishing a federal university in Delta State, pushed for highway construction and attempted to revive the steel sector. However, Brume's moderate position on allocation of revenues from oil produced in the Niger Delta to other regions of the country earned him unpopularity in his home state.

After the Delta Central Development Coalition passed a vote of no confidence on him in September 2002, Brume did not succeed in getting the PDP nomination to run for a second term in the Senate. The PDP instead selected former governor Felix Ibru as their candidate. Brume decamped to the Alliance for Democracy (AD), becoming senatorial candidate for that party. After losing the election to Ibru, Brume filed a petition with the Delta State Electoral Tribunal seeking nullification of Ibru's election.

== Later career ==
In January 2006, Brume was one of the aspirants to be a candidate for the 2007 presidential election, screened by the South-South People's Assembly Presidential Search Committee led by Chief Matthew Mbu. He had recently returned to the PDP. Brume was chairman of a committee that screened candidates for governor of Delta State in the 2007 elections, selecting Chief Great Ovedje Ogboru as the consensus candidate accepted by Urhobos, Ijaws, Itsekiris and other tribes for the Democratic Peoples Party (DPP). However the PDP candidate Emmanuel Uduaghan, protégé of the outgoing governor James Ibori, was elected. The April 14 elections were violent. Brume was later arrested on suspicion of involvement in the burning of several houses owned by PDP supporters. He was soon cleared of these unfounded charges.

In May 2009, as Chairman of the Niger Delta Consultative Forum Senator Brume described the Niger Delta situation as being very precarious and called on the government to adopt new methods of dealing with the problems. He said "it is truly time to re-consider our strategies and our actions". In June 2009, as leader of the PDP Delta Central Elders, Leaders and Stakeholders Forum, Brume advised Urhobo people to avoid self-imposed political isolation. Although the majority in the region, he said they should reach out to other ethnic groups and avoid extremes of ethnic nationalism.

In a rare interview in August 2009, Brume discussed the controversial Petroleum Industry Bill. He complained of bias against the people of the South-South, citing the decision of Rilwanu Lukman, Minister of Petroleum Resources, to only train lower-level workers at the Petroleum Training Institute in the Delta, while senior staff would be trained in Kaduna. He stated that the federal university in Delta State was being starved of funds, that the Liquefied Natural Gas project was being moved to a western location rather than cited in Bayelsa State as promised, and that the NNPC leadership were all Northerners.

Senator Fred Ayo Aghogho Brume died on 12 September 2011 after a brief illness. He died of heart-related complications.
