= Udokaha Esuene =

Brigadier Udokaha Jacob Esuene

Governor of South-Eastern State
- In office 28 May 1967 – July 1975
- Preceded by: Chukwuemeka Odumegwu Ojukwu (Eastern Region)
- Succeeded by: Paul Omu

Personal details
- Born: 1936
- Died: 1993 (aged 56–57)
- Party: MPN (1978), UPN (1982), SDP (1990)

Udokaha Jacob Esuene (1936 – 1993) was a Nigerian air force officer who was Military Governor of South-Eastern State (later renamed Cross River State) between May 1967 and July 1975 during the military regime of General Yakubu Gowon. He was the first governor after the state was formed in May 1967 when Eastern Region was split into East-Central State, Rivers State and South-Eastern states.

Esuene, who was of Ibibio ethnicity, was a fighter pilot before being appointed governor of South-Eastern State. Esuene was dismissed by General Murtala Muhammed when he seized power in July 1975, was charged and found guilt of illegally enriching himself while in office, and was dismissed from the military. The dismissal was, however, reversed by the Armed Forces Ruling Council led by the then Military President; General Ibrahim Babaginda. General Esuene's rank and benefits were restored and backdated to 1975. In the run-up to the 1993 presidential election, he was a candidate for the presidential ticket of the Social Democratic Party (SDP).

After his death, his wife Helen Esuene was appointed Minister of State for Health, and later Minister of Environment and Housing in the Cabinet of President Olusegun Obasanjo between 2005 and 2007.
