= Silas Janfa =

Nigerian politician

Senator of the Federal Republic of Nigeria from Plateau South Senatorial District
- In office May 1999 – May 2003
- Succeeded by: Cosmos Niagwan

Personal details
- Born: Plateau State, Nigeria
- Education: PhD in Financial Management

Silas Janfa was elected senator for the Plateau South constituency of Plateau State, Nigeria at the start of the Nigerian Fourth Republic, running on the People's Democratic Party (PDP) platform. He took office on 29 May 1999.

Janfa gained a doctorate in financial management. After taking his seat in the Senate in June 1999, he was appointed to committees on Public Accounts, Solid Minerals (vice chairman), Aviation, Transport, Commerce and Niger Delta. He was appointed a member of the Senate committee set up to review the controversial report by a panel headed by Senator Ibrahim Kuta which had indicted several senators for financial irregularities. He was a contender to represent his Senate district for a second term in 2003, but lost in the primaries to Cosmas Niagwan.

Janfa moved to the Action Congress Party, and ran on that platform for the Plateau South Senate seat in 2007. The election was won by John Shagaya, but Janfa petitioned the election tribunal to overturn the result on the basis that elections had been held in only three of the six local government areas. The tribunal nullified Shagaya's election, but after appeals Shagaya was declared elected.
