= 1999 Nigerian Senate elections in Imo State =

The 1999 Nigerian Senate election in Imo State was held on February 20, 1999, to elect members of the Nigerian Senate to represent Imo State. Ifeanyi Ararume representing Imo North and Evan Enwerem representing Imo East won on the platform of Peoples Democratic Party, while Arthur Nzeribe representing Imo West won on the platform of the All Nigeria Peoples Party.

== Overview ==
Affiliation	Party		Total
Affiliation	PDP	ANPP	Total
Before Election			3
After Election	2	1	3

== Summary ==
District	Incumbent	Party	Elected Senator	Party
Imo North			Ifeanyi Ararume	PDP
Imo East			Evan Enwerem	PDP
Imo West			Arthur Nzeribe	ANPP

== Results ==
=== Imo North ===
The election was won by Ifeanyi Ararume of the People's Democratic Party (Nigeria).

1999 Nigerian Senate election in Imo State
Party	Candidate	Votes	%
PDP	Ifeanyi Ararume		
Total votes			
PDP hold			

=== Imo East ===
The election was won by Evan Enwerem of the People's Democratic Party (Nigeria).

1999 Nigerian Senate election in Imo State
Party	Candidate	Votes	%
PDP	Evan Enwerem		
Total votes			
PDP hold			

=== Imo West ===
The election was won by Arthur Nzeribe of the All Nigeria Peoples Party.

1999 Nigerian Senate election in Imo State
Party	Candidate	Votes	%
ANPP	Arthur Nzeribe		
Total votes			
ANPP hold			
