= 1999 Nigerian Senate elections in Abia State =

The 1999 Nigerian Senate election in Abia State was held on February 20, 1999, to elect members of the Nigerian Senate to represent Abia State. Ike Nwachukwu representing Abia North, and Adolphus Wabara representing Abia South won on the platform of the Peoples Democratic Party, while Bob Nwannunu representing Abia Central won on the platform of All Nigeria Peoples Party.

== Overview ==
| Affiliation | Party | | Total |
| Affiliation | PDP | ANPP | Total |
|---|---|---|---|
| Before Election | | | 3 |
| After Election | 2 | 1 | 3 |

== Summary ==
| District | Incumbent | Party | Elected Senator | Party |
|---|---|---|---|---|
| Abia North | | | Ike Nwachukwu | PDP |
| Abia Central | | | Bob Nwannunu | ANPP |
| Abia South | | | Adolphus Wabara | PDP |

== Results ==
=== Abia North ===
The election was won by Ike Nwachukwu of the Peoples Democratic Party.

1999 Nigerian Senate election in Abia State
| Party | Candidate | Votes | % |
|---|---|---|---|
| PDP | Uche Chukwumerije | | |
| Total votes | | | |
| PDP hold | | | |

=== Abia Central ===
The election was won by Bob Nwannunu of the All Nigeria Peoples Party.

1999 Nigerian Senate election in Abia State
| Party | Candidate | Votes | % |
|---|---|---|---|
| ANPP | Bob Nwannunu | | |
| Total votes | | | |
| ANPP hold | | | |

=== Abia South ===
The election was won by Adolphus Wabara of the Peoples Democratic Party.

2003 Nigerian Senate election in Abia State
| Party | Candidate | Votes | % |
|---|---|---|---|
| PDP | Adolphus Wabara | | |
| Total votes | | | |
| PDP hold | | | |
