= Isa Mohammed Bagudu =

Nigerian politician

Isa Mohammed

Senator of the Federal Republic of Nigeria from Niger South Senatorial District
- In office 29 May 1999 – 29 May 2007
- Succeeded by: Zainab Abdulkadir Kure

Personal details
- Born: 1948 (age 77–78)
- Party: People's Democratic Party (PDP)

Isa Mohammed Bagudu (born 1948) is a Nigerian politician who was elected to the Nigerian Senate to represent the Niger South constituency in April 1999, and was reelected in April 2003.

Born in 1948 of Nupe origins, his father Waziri Bagudu was a member of the Ibadan Municipal Council in the 1950s. Bagudu attended Ansarudeen College, Isolo. He was a director of NICON from 1991 to 1993.

Bagudu was elected to the Niger South senatorial constituency of Niger state on the People's Democratic Party (PDP) platform in April 1999 at the start of the Nigerian Fourth Republic. He was appointed vice chairman of the Public Accounts Committee. In October 2004, he made the headlines when he slapped fellow-senator Mrs Iyabo Anisulowo, chairperson of the Senate Committee on State and Local Government Affairs, outside the lobby of the National Assembly. The Guardian reported that dispute may be related to disbursals of her committee's funds. The Senate responded by suspending him for two weeks.
