= 1999 Nigerian Senate elections in Plateau State =

The 1999 Nigerian Senate election in Plateau State was held on February 20, 1999, to elect members of the Nigerian Senate to represent Plateau State. Silas Janfa representing Plateau South, Ibrahim Mantu representing Plateau Central, and Davou Zang representing Plateau North all won on the platform of Peoples Democratic Party

== Overview ==
Affiliation	Party		Total
Affiliation	PDP	ANPP	Total
Before Election			3
After Election	3	0	3

== Summary ==
District	Incumbent	Party	Elected Senator	Party
Plateau South			Silas Janfa	PDP
Plateau Central			Ibrahim Mantu	PDP
Plateau North			Davou Zang	PDP

== Results ==
=== Plateau South ===
The election was won by Silas Janfa of the Peoples Democratic Party.

1999 Nigerian Senate election in Plateau State
Party	Candidate	Votes	%
PDP	Silas Janfa		
Total votes			
PDP hold			

=== Plateau Central ===
The election was won by Ibrahim Mantu of the Peoples Democratic Party.

1999 Nigerian Senate election in Plateau State
Party	Candidate	Votes	%
PDP	Ibrahim Mantu		
Total votes			
PDP hold			

=== Plateau North ===
The election was won by Davou Zang of the People's Democratic Party (Nigeria).

2003 Nigerian Senate election in Plateau State
Party	Candidate	Votes	%
PDP	Davou Zang		
Total votes			
PDP hold			
