= 1999 Nigerian Senate elections in Borno State =

1999 Nigerian Senate election in Borno State

The 1999 Nigerian Senate election in Borno State was held on February 20, 1999, to elect members of the Nigerian Senate to represent Borno State. Maina Maaji Lawan representing Borno North and Abubakar Mahdi representing Borno South won on the platform of Peoples Democratic Party, while Ali Modu Sheriff representing Borno Central won on the platform of the All Nigeria Peoples Party.

== Overview ==
Affiliation	Party		Total
Affiliation	PDP	ANPP	Total
Before Election			3
After Election	2	1	3

== Summary ==
District	Incumbent	Party	Elected Senator	Party
Borno North			Maina Maaji Lawan	PDP
Borno South			Abubakar Mahdi	PDP
Borno Central			Ali Modu Sheriff	ANPP

== Results ==
=== Borno North ===
The election was won by Maina Maaji Lawan of the Peoples Democratic Party.

1999 Nigerian Senate election in Borno State
Party	Candidate	Votes	%
PDP	Maina Maaji Lawan		
Total votes			
PDP hold			

=== Borno South ===
The election was won by Abubakar Mahdi of the Peoples Democratic Party.

1999 Nigerian Senate election in Borno State
Party	Candidate	Votes	%
PDP	Abubakar Mahdi		
Total votes			
PDP hold			

=== Borno Central ===
The election was won by Ali Modu Sheriff of the All Nigeria Peoples Party.

1999 Nigerian Senate election in Borno State
Party	Candidate	Votes	%
ANPP	Ali Modu Sheriff		
Total votes			
ANPP hold			
