= Joseph Waku =

Nigerian politician

Senator for Benue North West
- In office 3 June 1999 – 3 June 2003
- Preceded by: Iyorchia Ayu (1993)
- Succeeded by: Joshua Adagba

Personal details
- Born: Benue State, Nigeria
- Died: 3 February 2019

Joseph K.N. Waku was elected senator for the Benue North West constituency of Benue State, Nigeria, at the start of the Nigerian Fourth Republic, running on the People's Democratic Party (PDP) platform. He took office on 29 May 1999. After taking his seat in the senate in June 1999, he was appointed to committees on Senate Services, Works & Housing, Health, Establishment, Water Resources (chairman) and Privatization.

After leaving office, Waku became active in the Arewa Consultative Forum (ACF), a northern lobbying group. In a December 2003 interview he said that the Middle Belt Forum was deliberately excluding non-Christians from their organization, and explained that the ACF was formed to give a voice to northern minorities including those in the Middle Belt. Speaking as vice chairman in June 2008, he accused Senate President David Mark of ethnic prejudice in opposing the appointment of Farida Waziri, a Tiv, as head of the Economic and Financial Crimes Commission.
