= Sylvanus Ngele =

Nigerian politician

Sylvanus Ngiji Ngele

Senator for Ebonyi North
- In office 29 May 1999 – 29 May 2003
- Succeeded by: Christopher Nshi

Personal details
- Born: Ebonyi State, Nigeria

Sylvanus Ngiji Ngele was elected Senator for the Ebonyi North constituency of Ebonyi State, Nigeria at the start of the Nigerian Fourth Republic, running on the People's Democratic Party (PDP) platform. He took office on 29 May 1999.

After taking his seat in the Senate he was appointed to committees on Ethics, Security & Intelligence (vice chairman), Environment and Health.

== See also ==
- List of people from Ebonyi State
