= 1999 Nigerian House of Representatives elections in Kwara State =

The 1999 Nigerian House of Representatives elections in Kwara State was held on February 20, 1999, to elect members of the House of Representatives to represent Kwara State, Nigeria.

== Overview ==
Affiliation	Party		Total
Affiliation	APP	PDP	Total
Before Election	-	-	6
After Election	4	2	6

== Summary ==
District	Party	Elected Reps Member	Party
Asa/Ilorin West		Gbemisola Ruqayyah Saraki	APP
Baruten/Kaiama		Idris S. Abubakar	PDP
Edu/Moro/Patigi		Yunusa Y. Ahmed	PDP
Ekiti/Isin/Irepodun/Oke-ero		Basair Bola Oni	APP
Ilorin East/South		Farouk A. O. Farouk	APP
Offa/Oyun/Ifelodun		Rauf Kolawole Shitu	APP

== Results ==
=== Asa/Ilorin West ===
APP candidate Gbemisola Ruqayyah Saraki won the election, defeating other party candidates.

1999 Nigerian House of Representatives election in Kwara State
Party	Candidate	Votes	%
APP	Gbemisola Ruqayyah Saraki		
APP hold			

=== Baruten/Kaiama ===
PDP candidate Idris S. Abubakar won the election, defeating other party candidates.

1999 Nigerian House of Representatives election in Kwara State
Party	Candidate	Votes	%
PDP	Idris S. Abubakar		
PDP hold			

=== Edu/Moro/Patigi ===
PDP candidate Yunusa Y. Ahmed won the election, defeating other party candidates.

1999 Nigerian House of Representatives election in Kwara State
Party	Candidate	Votes	%
PDP	Yunusa Y. Ahmed		
PDP hold			

=== Ekiti/Isin/Irepodun/Oke-ero ===
APP candidate Basair Bola Oni won the election, defeating other party candidates.

1999 Nigerian House of Representatives election in Kwara State
Party	Candidate	Votes	%
APP	Basair Bola Oni		
APP hold			

=== Ilorin East/South ===
APP candidate Farouk A. O. Farouk won the election, defeating other party candidates.

1999 Nigerian House of Representatives election in Kwara State
Party	Candidate	Votes	%
APP	Farouk A. O. Farouk		
APP hold			

=== Offa/Oyun/Ifelodun ===
APP candidate Rauf Kolawole Shitu won the election, defeating other party candidates.

1999 Nigerian House of Representatives election in Kwara State
Party	Candidate	Votes	%
APP	Rauf Kolawole Shitu		
Election box winning candidate no change hold			
