= Iyabo Anisulowo =

Nigerian educator and elder stateswoman

Senator of the Federal Republic of Nigeria
- In office 2003–2007
- President: Olusegun Obasanjo
- Preceded by: Olabiyi Durojaiye
- Constituency: Ogun West

Minister of State for Education
- In office 1995–1998
- President: Sani Abacha

Ogun State Commissioner for Agriculture, Rural Development and Water Resources
- Incumbent
- Assumed office 1994

Personal details
- Born: Iyabo Veronica Ajibogun; 21 March 1951 (age 75) Lagos, Nigeria
- Party: Peoples Democratic Party
- Education: University of Lagos; Ahmadu Bello University
- Occupation: Politician, educator, public servant
- Known for: Nigerian politician and former senator

Iyabo Veronica Anishulowo (née Ajibogun) is a Nigerian educator and elder stateswoman who served the Federal Government of Nigeria at various levels, she is one of the most prominent female political personalities and proponents of gender equality in Africa. She rose through the ranks from grass root level as a teacher to serve as a Federal Minister and Senator.

Iyabo Anisulowo is often described as a Liberal Conservative because of her pro-family values and feminine independence through universal quality education stance when she served in the Senate, she was recognised as an 'Afropolitan Feminist'.

== State politics ==
Anisulowo joined politics in 1991 when she was appointed Secretary to the Local Government in Ogun State. A year later, she became the Commissioner of the Ogun State Civil Service Commission. She also served as Commissioner for Agriculture, Rural Development and Water Resources and Minister of State for Education during General Sanni Abacha's regime. She later left the State Ministry for Education to contest for the governorship under the Ogun State chapter of the All People's Party.

== Senate ==
Anishulowo represented Ogun West in the Senate from 2003–2007. The former Senator is one of the members of the People's Democratic Party who defected to join the All Progressives Congress coalition. In October 15, 2004, following allegations that she withdrew N500,000 and N700,000 respectively from the pockets of the Senate Committee for State and Local Governments, Senator Anisulowo was physically assaulted by fellow Senator Isa Mohammed who represented to hardline conservative PDP of Niger West during the Olusegun Obasanjo Administration. She has of course denied this allegation saying the money was for the Interparliamentary Union Meeting in Geneva, Switzerland that year. Iyabo Anishulowo has never been prosecuted or convicted of any crime.

== Personal life ==
Anishulowo is married with children and lives in Ilaro, the biggest metropolitan in the area she represented in the Senate.
