= Ayo Oni =

Nigerian politician

Ayo Ade Oni

Senator for Ekiti Central
- In office May 1999 – May 2003
- Succeeded by: Clement Awoyelu

Personal details
- Born: Ekiti State, Nigeria

Ayo Ade Oni was elected Senator for the Ekiti Central constituency of Ekiti State, Nigeria at the start of the Nigerian Fourth Republic, running on the Alliance for Democracy (AD) platform. He took office on 29 May 1999. After taking his seat in the Senate in June 1999 he was appointed to committees on Aviation, Works & Housing, Transport, State & Local Government and Women Affairs. In a December 2001 survey of Senators, ThisDay characterized Oni as a "benchwarmer" a senator who had not been visible on the floor of the Senate or anywhere in the activities of the Senate.
