= Joseph Olatunji Ajayi =

Nigerian politician

Senator for Ekiti North
- In office 29 May 1999 – 29 May 2003
- Succeeded by: James Kolawole

Personal details
- Born: Ekiti State, Nigeria

Joseph Olatunji Ajayi was elected Senator for the Ekiti North constituency of Ekiti State, Nigeria at the start of the Nigerian Fourth Republic, running on the Alliance for Democracy (AD) platform. He took office on 29 May 1999.

After taking his seat in the Senate he was appointed Chairman of the committee on Tourism & Culture and a member of the committees on Ethics, Internal Affairs and Information.
