= Ben-Collins Ndu =

Nigerian politician

Senator for Enugu West
- In office March 2001 – May 2003
- Preceded by: Hyde Onuaguluchi
- Succeeded by: Ike Ekweremadu

Personal details
- Born: 6 November 1961 (age 64) Ezeagu LGA, Enugu State, Nigeria
- Party: People's Democratic Party (PDP)

Ben-Collins Ndu (born 6 November 1961) was elected Senator for the Enugu West constituency of Enugu State, Nigeria in March 2001 running on the People's Democratic Party (PDP) platform.

Ndu is from Ezeagu local government area of Enugu State. He was a candidate in the April 1999 elections for the Enugu West Senate seat, running against Reverend Hyde Onuaguluchi of the All People's Party (APP), but Onuaguluchi was declared elected. Ndu filed an election petition with the Election Tribunal on the basis that the figures were falsified and there were gross irregularities in the conduct of the election in the Awgu and Aninri local governments. After a protracted legal battle, in March 2001, the Supreme Court annulled Onuaguluchi's election and ordered fresh elections.

Ndu went on to be elected to the Enugu West Senate seat. He was appointed Chairman of the Senate Committee on the Independent National Electoral Commission. Before the run up to the April 2003 elections, Ndu had fallen out with Enugu State Governor Chimaroke Nnamani. The PDP therefore chose Ike Ekweremadu, Chief of Staff to the governor, as their candidate for Enugu West and he went on to win election.

On 31 July 2013, it was announced that Ben-Collins Ndu had been appointed Chairman of The National Centre for Technology Management.
