= Paul Omu =

Nigerian politician (1940–2025)

Major General Paul Ufuoma Omu

Governor of South-Eastern State
- In office July 1975 – July 1978
- Preceded by: Uduokaha Esuene
- Succeeded by: Babatunde Elegbede

Personal details
- Born: July 1940 Igbide, Colony and Protectorate of Nigeria
- Died: 29 April 2025 (aged 84)

Military service
- Allegiance: Nigeria
- Branch/service: Nigerian Army
- Rank: Major General

Paul Ufuoma Omu (July 1940 – 29 April 2025) was a Nigerian politician who served as Military Governor of South-Eastern State (renamed Cross River State in February 1976) between July 1975 and July 1978 during the military regimes of Generals Murtala Muhammed and Olusegun Obasanjo.

== Military career ==
Omu joined the army on 10 December 1962, and was a course mate to Ibrahim Babangida, Sani Bello and Garba Duba at the Nigeria Military Training College. He attended the Mons Officer Cadet School, Aldershot in the United Kingdom and was commissioned on 25 July 1963. He was Commander, 33 Infantry Brigade in July 1975, when appointed Governor of South-Eastern State.

In 1984, the Muhammadu Buhari regime created military tribunals to try public officers from the Shehu Shagari era who had been accused of embezzling public funds. Omu was appointed chairman of the Lagos Zone tribunal. The tribunal found most of the politicians guilty, handing down jail sentences of various terms. In September 1985 Omu was Commandant, Command and Staff College and a member of the Armed Forces Ruling Council. When General Ibrahim Babangida decided to plan for the transfer to civilian rule, he appointed Omu chairman of a nine-man panel to review recommendations of the Political Bureau and draft a White Paper on the transition.

Omu retired from the army with the rank of Major General on 3 September 1990 along with a large batch of senior officers in the months following the April 1990 Orkar/Mukoro coup attempt, although he was not implicated in the coup.

== Later career ==
In 1999, his wife Stella Omu was elected National Senator for the Delta South constituency of Delta State.

In April 2008, Omu was head of the South-South reconciliation committee of the People's Democratic Party, set up to resolve differences among factions of the party. In July 2008, Delta State Governor Emmanuel Uduaghan appointed Omu a member of the Delta State Vision 2020 Council, charged with articulating the vision and long-term development plan for the state. In September 2009 President Umaru Musa Yar'Adua appointed Omu chairman of the 10-member Governing Board of the National Institute of Policy and Strategic Studies (NIPSS), charged with reviewing the law of the institution.

Omu was inaugurated as the president general of the Isoko Development Union (IDU) which is the umbrella organisation of the Isoko-speaking peoples of the Niger delta region of Delta State, Nigeria, to preside over issues involving the Isoko nation, Delta State, and Nigeria in general. He succeeded Gregory Oke Akpojene, whose tenure lasted from 1993 to 1996. Omu's period in office ended effectively in January 2014.

== Death ==
Omu died on 29 April 2025, at the age of 84.
