= Wilson Asinobi Ake =

Nigerian politician

Member of the Senate of Nigeria
- In office 29 May 2007 – 29 May 2015
- Preceded by: Ibiapuye Martyns-Yellowe
- Succeeded by: Osinakachukwu Ideozu
- Constituency: Rivers West

Personal details
- Born: 21 September 1955 (age 70) Rivers State, Nigeria

Wilson Asinobi Ake (born 21 September 1955) is a former member of the Senate of Nigeria who represented the Rivers West senatorial district from 2007 to 2015. He is a member of the People's Democratic Party (PDP).

== Early life and education ==
Ake earned a bachelor's degree from the University of Science And Technology, Port Harcourt, Rivers State.

== Political career ==
He was deputy chairman of the old Ahoada Local Government Area (1990–1991), and director of Rivers State Television (1992–1993). He was elected a member of the House of Representatives (1999–2003).

After taking his seat in the Senate, he was appointed chairman of the committee on Employment, Labour & Productivity, and a member of committees on Power, Navy, and Education. In a mid-term evaluation of Senators in May 2009, ThisDay said he had sponsored bills on amending the National Directorate of Employment, Protecting Nigerian Sportsmen and Women and Prohibiting False Advertisement Claims on Employment, Admissions and Contract opportunities. He had sponsored a motion to create job opportunities and stop illegal migration, and had co-sponsored a motion for prosecution of those involved in the Halliburton saga.

Wilson Ake was again the PDP candidate for Rivers West Senator in the 2011 elections. He won with 34,931 votes, far ahead of the runner-up from the Action Congress of Nigeria (ACN) with 6,446 votes.

== Personal life ==
Ake is married and has 1 child.
