= Francis E. Waive =

Nigerian priest and politician

- Incumbent
- Assumed office 11 June 2019
- Constituency: Ughelli North/South/Udu

Member, House of Representatives (Nigeria) House of Representatives (Nigeria)
- Incumbent
- Assumed office 11 June 2019

Personal details
- Born: 21 May 1966 (age 60) Lagos, Lagos State, Nigeria
- Party: All Progressives Congress (APC)
- Spouse: Rita Waive
- Children: 5
- Education: Edo State University Ekpoma
- Profession: Politician, clergy
- Website: www.franciswaive.com

Francis Ejiroghene Waive (born 21 May 1966) is a Nigerian priest and politician who currently serves as a member of the House of Representatives, from Delta state and the Ughelli North/South/Udu federal constituency.

== Early life and education ==
Waive was born on 21 May 1966 in Lagos Nigeria. He attended the Aladja grammar school in Udu, Delta State, Nigeria, and received a degree in accounting from the Edo State University Ekpoma, now known as the Ambrose Ali University. He studied accounting.

== Career ==
Waive was deployed to Lagos State for his National Youth Service Corps. He completed his NYSC with Oceanic Bank PLC now known as Ecobank Nigeria. He resigned several years later from the bank having decided to become a minister. He relocated to Warri, Nigeria to start the Church of the Anointing in 1997.

Until his election into the House of representatives, Waive was the senior pastor of the Church of the Anointing Warri. He helped establish the Riverine Communities Health & Development Organization, intended to dispense charity to the medically deprived communities of the core Niger Delta region.

He is currently the chairman House committee on Rules and Business of the 10th Assembly in the House of Representatives

== 2019 election ==
His election into the House of Representatives was riddled with numerous litigations from the state high courts to the Supreme Court of Nigeria. The APC party primaries alone had 8 litigations one of which was eventual settled in the Supreme court. His major opponent during the APC primary Julius Akpovoka had claimed to be the rightful winner of the primaries in some suits and in others claimed that Waive had stepped down for his candidacy. These litigations would set some major judicial precedents especially in Delta State where in the 2015 elections a candidate was declared dead and his candidacy given to another while he was still alive and campaigning.

== Personal life ==
Waive is married to Rita, who is a guidance and counselling educationist. They have five children.
