= Arthur Nzeribe =

Nigerian politician (1938–2022)

Francis Arthur Nzeribe

Senator for Imo - Orlu
- In office May 1999 – May 2007

Personal details
- Born: 2 November 1938 Oguta, Imo State, Nigeria
- Died: 8 May 2022 (aged 83) Oguta, Imo State, Nigeria
- Party: PDP
- Spouse: Dr. Tonia Ogbeyanu Ngozi Nzeribe

Francis Arthur Nzeribe (2 November 1938 – 8 May 2022) was a Nigerian politician who was Senator for the Orlu Senatorial constituency in Imo State from October 1983 to December 1983 and May 1999 to May 2007 on the People's Democratic Party (PDP) slate.

== Background ==
Nzeribe, a multi-billionaire investment mogul, was born in Oguta, Imo State on 2 November 1938. His father, Oyimba Nzeribe, was a lawyer and former state counsel, and his grandfather, Akpati Nzeribe, held the traditional title of Ogbuagu, Oshiji, Damanze Oyimba of Oguta. His wife of over 30 years, Dr. Tonia Ogbeyanu Ngozi Nzeribe (The Odaze of Illah in Delta state), is the sister of Hajia Asabe Shehu Musa Yar’Adua, wife of the late General Shehu Musa Yar'Adua, who was brother of President Umaru Yar'Adua.

Nzeribe lost his mother when he was a primary school student, while his father was away in Great Britain studying law. His care was taken over by Catholic priests who were involved in furthering his education. He attended Bishop Shanahan College, Orlu and Holy Ghost College, Owerri. In 1957, he traveled to Lagos where he obtained employment with Nigeria's port authority as an engineering cadet, and a year later, he received a scholarship from the NPA to study marine engineering. He took courses at Portsmouth College of Technology and later attended Chesterfield College of Technology in England. By 1960 he was selling life insurance to black immigrants in Britain. Returning to Nigeria in 1961 he was briefly an employee of Shell, then for a few months an Air Force cadet. Thereafter, he worked for Gulf Oil at the firm's Escravos facility.

Nizeribe soon left Gulf Oil and returned to London, where he established Jeafan, a public relations firm, alongside one Ghanain and two English patners. The firm represented several Afrian diplomatic missions in London, including the High Commision of Ghana, where the well-dressed and courteous Nzieribe gained the confidence of several notable clients. Through the Ghana Commission, he met Kwame Nkrumah of Ghana and started to work for him in public relations. Nkrumah also introduced him to other African leaders. In 1966, when the National Liberation Council (NLC) overthrew Nkrumah, Nzeribe and Jeafan briefly lost influence in Ghana but the NLC leadership soon turned to Jeafan to help improve the public image of their administration. Nzeribe developed a working relationship with Joseph Arthur Ankrah, head of the liberation council, but when Ankrah left office in April 1969, Nzeribe lost influence in Ghana.

In 1969, Nzeribe started up the Fanz Organization based in London, dealing in heavy construction, arms, oil brokerage, publishing and property investment, with much business in the Middle East and Gulf states. By 1979, Fanz had an annual trading turnover of £70 million. He is believed to be worth over 1.5 billion dollars as of 2018. In Nigeria, Nzeribe built up Sentinel Assurance and other companies. His country home in Oguta is called Heaven of Peace, an estate that contains multiple mansions. In 1983, he spent N12m to win a Senatorial seat in Orlu. Ten years later, he was a prominent supporter of the Association for Better Nigeria which backed General Ibrahim Babangida.

== June 12 election annulment ==
On June 10, 1993, Nzeribe tried to stop the election, relying on a court order which his group, Association for Better Nigeria, got from a midnight ruling from late Justice Bassey Ikpeme of Abuja High Court. ABN was known to be pro-Babangida.

== Senate career ==
Arthur Nzeribe was elected Senator for the Imo Orlu constituency in 1999 and was reelected in 2003. In November 2002, Senate President Anyim Pius Anyim indefinitely suspended Senator Nzeribe due to an allegation of a N22 million fraud. Nzeribe was said to be planning an impeachment motion against Anyim.

In April 2006, the Orlu People’s Consultative Assembly, sponsored by the governor of Imo state Achike Udenwa, staged what it called “One million March” to drum up support for Nzeribe’s recall from the Senate. In the December 2006 PDP primaries for the 2007 Senatorial candidates, he was defeated by Osita Izunaso.

== Later career ==
In August 2007 Nzeribe was appointed a member of the Board of Trustees of the PDP. He died from COVID-19 on 8 May 2022.

== Bibliography ==
- Francis Arthur Nzeribe (1985). Nigeria, another hope betrayed: the second coming of the Nigerian military. Kilimanjaro.
- Francis Arthur Nzeribe (1986). Nigeria: the turning point : a charter for stability. Fourth Dimension Publishers. ISBN 978-156-229-3.
- Francis Arthur Nzeribe (1988). Nigeria I believe: a manifesto for the Third Republic. Kilimanjaro Publishing Co.
- Francis Arthur Nzeribe (1990). Nigeria: seven years after Shehu Shagari. Kilimanjaro Pub. Co.
