= Abubakar Mahdi =

Nigerian politician

Senator for Borno South
- In office 3 June 1999 – 3 June 2003
- Preceded by: Himself (1993)
- Succeeded by: Omar Hambagda
- In office 5 December 1992 – 17 November 1993
- Succeeded by: Himself (1999)

Personal details
- Born: Borno State, Nigeria

Abubakar Mahdi was elected Senator for the Borno South constituency of Borno State, Nigeria at the start of the Nigerian Fourth Republic, running on the People's Democratic Party (PDP) platform. He took office on 29 May 1999. After taking his seat in the Senate he was appointed to committees on Security & Intelligence, Foreign Affairs (Vice-Chairman), Power & Steel, Federal Character and Federal Capital Territory.
