= Usman Umar Kibiya =

Nigerian politician

Usman Kibiya Umar OON mni
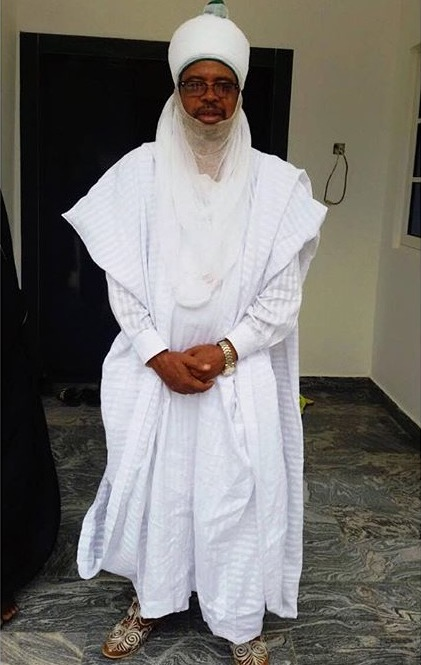
- Usman Kibiya Umar August 2016

Sarkin Kibiya
- Incumbent
- Assumed office 26 May 2007
- Preceded by: Alh Ado Abdullahi Kibiya

Senator of the Federal Republic of Nigeria
- In office June 2003 – May 2007
- Preceded by: Masʽud El-Jibril
- Succeeded by: Kabiru Ibrahim Gaya

Acting Comptroller General Nigeria Immigration Service
- In office July 1999 – January 2000
- Preceded by: Sahabi Dange
- Succeeded by: Late Uzoamaka Nwuaizu

Personal details
- Born: 12 June 1949 (age 77) Kibiya LGA, Kano State, Nigeria
- Party: ANPP (2003-2007); APC (2013-Date).
- Children: Eight (Six living)
- Education: Ahmadu Bello University; University of Maryland, College Park USA; Royal Institute of Public Administration London

Usman Umar Kibiya OON (born 12 June 1949) is the Sarkin Kibiya of Kibiya Local Government Area of Kano State. He was turbaned on 26 May 2007 following the death of Late Sarkin Kibiya Alh Ado Abdullahi Kibiya.

Usman Kibiya Umar worked in the Nigeria Immigration Service for thirty years, rising to become the Acting Comptroller General of Nigeria Immigration Service. He retired in January 2000 and took up full-time business and politics. He ran for the office of Senator, representing Kano South senatorial district in 2003 and was elected to the Nigerian National Assembly in May 2003, representing the Kano South senatorial district of Kano State under the platform of ANPP.

== Early life ==
U. K. Umar was born on 12 June 1949 in Kibiya Local Government Area. He attended Kibiya Junior Primary School from 1955 to 1958 and Rano Senior Primary school where he obtained his First School Leaving Certificate in 1962. He attended Birnin Kudu Government Secondary School from 1963 to 1967. U. K. Umar got admission into Ahmadu Bello University (ABU) Zaria, where he obtained a Diploma in Law in 1970. He furthered his studies and obtained a bachelor's degree in political science at University of Maryland, College Park from 1977 to 1980. He obtained a Middle Management in Royal Institute of Public Administration in London in 1975. Umar also attended National Institute for Policy and Strategic Studies Kuru, only from January 1993 to November 1993.

U. K. Umar joined the Nigeria Immigration Service in July 1970 as Immigration Officer, He served in various Nigeria Immigration commands holding various strategic positions including Immigration Attaché Nigeria Embassy Washington DC-USA, Comptroller of Immigration Murtala Mohammed Airport Ikeja -Lagos, Deputy Director Administration and Finance Headquarters Abuja, DCG of Immigration Investigation Directorate, DCG of Immigration Administration and Finance before he was Appointed as Acting Comptroller General of Nigeria Immigration Service in July 1999. His tenure as the Acting Comptroller General of Immigration Service has been described as exemplary, as he had played a significant role in the transformation of the Nigeria Immigration Service until his retirement in Jan 2000.

== Personal life ==
Sarkin Kibiya is married and has seven children (six living) and thirteen grandchildren.

== Senate career ==
U. K. Umar was elected to the Senate in May 2003 Representing Kano south (ALBASU, BEBEJI, BUNKURE, DOGUWA, GAYA, KIRU, RANO, TAKAI, AJINGI, ROGO, KIBIYA, TUDUN WADA, GARKO, WUDIL, SUMAILA) Local Government Areas.

U. K. Umar was the Senate Deputy Minority Leader from May 2003 until 2007.

He was appointed to Committees as: Vice Chairman Senate Committee on Commerce, Vice Chairman Senate Committee on Women Affairs and Youth Development, Member Senate Committee on Security and Intelligence, Member Senate Committee on Labour and Productivity, Member Senate Committee on Information, Member Senate committee on Internal Affairs, Member Senate committee on States and Local Govt. Affairs and Member Senate committee on Finance.

== Positions and offices held ==
Usman Kibiya Umar is a Member National Institute for Policy and Strategic Studies (mni).

Usman Kibiya Uamr is the chairman and CEO of Lanyo Group of Companies, He is also a director IEI Anchor Pension Managers Limited, chairman Muslim Community Center, chairman Abuja Center for Islamic Propagation CIP, member Kano State University of Technology Council, member Kano state Business Incentive Committee, chairman National Association of Micro Finance Bank (North West) and as well member National Association of Micro Finance Bank (Nigeria) from 2012-date.

He was the president of Nigeria Basketball Federation (NBBF) from 1989 to 2000 and a member Nigeria Olympic Committee from 1984 to 2000. He also served as the chairman Kano State College of Education from 2001 to 2003.

== Awards and national honors ==
Officer of the Order of the Niger OON, awarded by the president of the Federal Republic of Nigeria.

== See also ==
- Nigeria Immigration Service
- All Nigeria Peoples Party
- All Progressives Congress
