= 1999 Nigerian Senate elections in Cross River State =

The 1999 Nigerian Senate election in Cross River State was held on February 20, 1999, to elect members of the Nigerian Senate to represent Cross River State. John James Akpan Udo-Edehe representing Cross River North, and Matthew Mbu representing Cross River Central won on the platform of the Peoples Democratic Party, while Florence Ita Giwa representing Cross River South won on the platform of All Nigeria Peoples Party.

== Overview ==
Affiliation	Party		Total
Affiliation	PDP	ANPP	Total
Before Election			3
After Election	2	1	3

== Summary ==
District	Incumbent	Party	Elected Senator	Party
Cross River North			John James Akpan Udo-Edehe	PDP
Cross River Central			Matthew Mbu	PDP
Cross River South			Florence Ita Giwa	ANPP

== Results ==
=== Cross River North ===
The election was won by John James Akpan Udo-Edehe of the Peoples Democratic Party.

1999 Nigerian Senate election in Cross River State
Party	Candidate	Votes	%
PDP	John James Akpan Udo-Edehe		
Total votes			
PDP hold			

=== Cross River Central ===
The election was won by Matthew Mbu of the People's Democratic Party.

1999 Nigerian Senate election in Cross River State
Party	Candidate	Votes	%
PDP	Matthew Mbu		
Total votes			
PDP hold			

=== Cross River South ===
The election was won by Florence Ita Giwa of the All Nigeria Peoples Party.

1999 Nigerian Senate election in Cross River State
Party	Candidate	Votes	%
ANPP	Florence Ita Giwa		
Total votes			
ANPP hold			
