= Olabiyi Durojaiye =

Nigerian politician (1933–2021)

Senator for Ogun East
- In office 29 May 1999 – 29 May 2003
- Succeeded by: Tokunbo Ogunbanjo

Personal details
- Born: 8 February 1933 Ogun State, Nigeria
- Died: 24 August 2021 (aged 88) Lagos, Nigeria

Olabiyi Durojaiye (8 February 1933 – 24 August 2021) was elected Senator for the Ogun East constituency of Ogun State, Nigeria at the start of the Nigerian Fourth Republic, running on the Alliance for Democracy (AD) platform. He took office on 29 May 1999. He also used the tribal title Otunba as a pre-nominal style, thereby highlighting his position as a chieftain of the Yoruba people.

== Birth and early career ==
Durojaiye earned a BSc (Economics) London, and an LLB, London. He was called to the Nigerian Bar in 1979, and was a Barrister and Solicitor of the Supreme Court of Nigeria. He also graduated from the National Institute for Policy and Strategic Studies, Kuru. He worked for 35 years in the Nigerian public sector, including 28 years as a Director of the Central Bank of Nigeria and the National Mint.

He worked with the International Monetary Fund, the Federal Reserve System in the U.S.A. and the City University London between 1964 and 1982.

== Political career ==
Durojaiye was an elected member of the 1988/89 Constituent Assembly.

In 1992 he was a candidate to run for President of Nigeria on the platform of the Social Democratic Party (SDP), losing to M.K.O. Abiola. Abiola's subsequent election as president was quashed by General Ibrahim Babangida, leading to a return to military rule. In December 1996 Durojaiye was arrested by the military regime of General Sani Abacha, and was imprisoned for 560 days and mistreated while in jail.

A June 1997 report stated the 63-year-old lawyer was reportedly in poor health and suffering from high blood pressure caused by his treatment. Amnesty International designated him a prisoner of conscience and campaigned for his release.

Durojaiye was an elected Senator of the Federal Republic of Nigeria (1999-2003). After taking his seat in the Senate he was appointed to committees on Judiciary, Establishment (Chairman) and Special Projects.

In December 2002 he recommended a life jail-term for anyone who perpetrated election fraud.

He won the AD primaries to represent the party in the Ogun East constituency in the 2003 elections, although he was threatened with legal action by Chief Adamo Olayinka Yesufu, a rival for the nomination. PDP candidate Tokunbo Ogunbanjo won the election.

== Later events ==
Durojaiye's wife Florence Olufunso Adejoke died on 6 June 2009, aged 72, in Ikeja, two months after she and her husband had marked their 50th wedding anniversary. She was survived by her husband, six children and many grandchildren. In a March 2010 interview Durojaiye, now in his late 70s, spoke out against the covert way in which President Umaru Yar'Adua's illness was being handled, with the President smuggled back into Nigeria at night and no reports issued on his condition.

Durojaiye died of COVID-19 in August 2021.
