= Telephone numbers in Nigeria =

- Country: Nigeria
- Continent: Africa
- NSN length: 10
- Country code: 234
- International access: 009
- Long-distance: 0

Telephone numbers in Nigeria are administered by the Nigerian Communications Commission. Fixed-line numbers are composed of a combination of an area code and a local line or subscriber telephone number. The area code consists of 20 followed by one digit (Lagos, Ibadan and Abuja) or two digits. The 20 was added to the beginning of each fixed-line area code in 2023, during which there was a grace period when both area code formats were accepted, which lasted until 1 January 2024. Local telephone numbers contain from five to seven digits, and may vary within the area code. Mobile telephone numbers start with 070, 080 or 081, 090 or 091, and are followed by eight digits. They contain eleven digits altogether and vary depending on network.

== Calling formats ==
These examples use calls to Lagos as an example:

- xxx xxxx – Calls within the same local area code (Lagos)
- 0201 xxx xxxx – Calls to Lagos from another Nigerian geographic area
- +234 201 xxx xxxx – Calls to Lagos from outside Nigeria
- 0xxx xxx xxxx – Calls to a Nigerian mobile number

== Mobile network prefixes ==
The following prefixes are assigned to mobile telephone network operators. Nigeria implemented mobile number portability in 2013. Therefore, prefixes no longer reliably indicate the parent network of a number.

Prefix	Network
0701	Airtel Nigeria
07020	Smile
07025	MTN Nigeria (formerly Visafone)
07026	MTN Nigeria (formerly Visafone)
07027	Multi-Links
07028	Starcomms
07029	Starcomms
0703	MTN Nigeria
0704	MTN Nigeria (formerly Visafone)
0705	Globacom
0706	MTN Nigeria
0707	MTN Nigeria (formerly ZoomMobile)
0708	Airtel Nigeria
0709	Multi-Links
0802	Airtel Nigeria
0803	MTN Nigeria
0804	Mtel
0805	Globacom
0806	MTN Nigeria
0807	Globacom
0808	Airtel Nigeria
0809	9mobile
0810	MTN Nigeria
0811	Globacom
0812	Airtel Nigeria
0813	MTN Nigeria
0814	MTN Nigeria
0815	Globacom
0816	MTN Nigeria
0817	9mobile
0818	9mobile
0819	Starcomms
0909	9mobile
0908	9mobile
0901	Airtel Nigeria
0902	Airtel Nigeria
0903	MTN Nigeria
0904	Airtel Nigeria
0905	Globacom
0906	MTN Nigeria
0907	Airtel Nigeria
0915	Globacom
0913	MTN Nigeria
0912	Airtel Nigeria
0916	MTN Nigeria
0911	Airtel Nigeria

== Area codes ==
List of area codes
Area/City	Area Code	Area/City	Area Code
Lagos	0201	Ibadan	0202
Abuja	0209	Ado-Ekiti	02030
Ilorin	02031	New Bussa	02033
Akure	02034	Oshogbo	02035
Ile-Ife	02036	Ijebu-Ode	02037
Oyo	02038	Abeokuta	02039
Wukari	02041	Enugu	02042
Abakaliki	02043	Makurdi	02044
Ogoja	02045	Onitsha	02046
Lafia	02047	Awka	02048
Ikare	02050	Owo	02051
Benin City	02052	Warri	02053
Sapele	02054	Agbor	02055
Asaba	02056	Auchi	02057
Lokoja	02058	Okitipupa	02059
Sokoto	02060	Kafanchan	02061
Kaduna	02062	Gusau	02063
Kano	02064	Katsina	02065
Minna	02066	Kontagora	02067
Birnin-Kebbi	02068	Zaria	02069
Pankshin	02070	Azare	02071
Gombe	02072	Jos	02073
Yola	02075	Maiduguri	02076
Bauchi	02077	Hadejia	02078
Jalingo	02079	Aba	02082
Owerri	02083	Port Harcourt	02084
Uyo	02085	Ahoada	02086
Calabar	02087	Umuahia	02088
Yenagoa	02089	Ubiaja	02055
Kwara	02031	Igarra	02057
Ughelli	02053	Uromi	02057

== Other numbers ==
Tollfree numbers begin with “0800” (800 without the leading zero), while non-tollfree numbers start with “0700” or 700 without the leading zero. These numbers have 10 digits and are not mobile numbers.

The emergency number is 112 and also 767 in Lagos state.

== See also ==
- List of telephone operating companies in Nigeria
