= John Azuta-Mbata =

Nigerian politician

Senator for Rivers East
- In office May 1999 – May 2007
- Succeeded by: George Thompson Sekibo

Personal details
- Born: January 1960 (age 66) Rivers State, Nigeria

John Azuta-Mbata is a Nigerian politician who served as Senator for the Rivers East constituency of Rivers State, Nigeria at the start of the Nigerian Fourth Republic, running on the People's Democratic Party (PDP) platform. He took office on 29 May 1999. He was re-elected in April 2003. He is the current President-General of the Ọhanaeze Ndigbo.

Azuta-Mbata was born in January 1960. He earned a Masters in Public Administration from the University of Ibadan. He was a member of the Governing council of Rivers state university of science & Technology, Port Harcourt. After taking his seat in the Senate in June 1999, he was appointed to committees on Defense, Works & Housing, Women Affairs, Finance & Appropriation (vice chairman), Information, Special Projects and Local & Foreign Debts.

In April 2005, the Independent Corrupt Practices and Other Related Offences Commission (ICPC) arraigned Azuta-Mbata and others for involvement in an alleged N55 million budget bribe scam. Also charged were former Senate President Adolphus Wabara and former Education Minister Fabian Osuji. They were said to have demanded, received and shared N55 million to facilitate the passage of Education ministry's budget. After extended legal battles, on 1 June 2010 a full panel of the Court of Appeal in Abuja quashed all the charges, discharged and acquitted the accused.

On 10 January 2025, Azuta-Mbata was elected as the President-General of the Ohanaeze Ndigbo, a socio-cultural group in Nigeria. He succeeded Fidelis Chukwu, whose temporary tenure as came to an end.
