= Adawari Pepple =

Nigerian politician

Adawari Michael Pepple

Senator for Rivers South East
- Incumbent
- Assumed office 29 May 1999
- Succeeded by: Azuta M. John

Personal details
- Born: Rivers State, Nigeria

Adawari Michael Pepple was elected Senator for the Rivers South East constituency of Rivers State, Nigeria at the start of the Nigerian Fourth Republic, running on the People's Democratic Party (PDP) platform. He took office on 29 May 1999.

== Early life ==
After taking his seat in the Senate in June 1999, Pepple was appointed to committees on Petroleum, Industry (vice chairman), Water Resources, Education, Social Development & Sports and Federal Capital Territory. He was appointed Senate Chief Whip in 2002. Pepple was a proponent of a constitutional change whereby the President and the state Governors would be able to serve only for a single five-year term. After the International Court of Justice had ruled that the disputed Bakassi Peninsula belonged to Cameroun, he noted that "The value of lives of Nigerians in the Bakassi Peninsula and beyond far out-weighs the worth of oil and gas deposit in the area". In an October 2002 review of senator performance, the Vanguard noted that Pepple had presented seven Bills in the current Assembly.

== Membership of association. awards ==
Michael Pepple is not only a member of the Manufacturers Association of Nigeria (MAN), he is the Chairman of MAN Rivers / Bayelsa States branch. He is a recipient of the Distinguished Service Star award of Rivers State (DSSRS).
