= Kehinde Agboola =

Nigerian politician

Kehinde Agboola is a Nigerian politician. He served as a member representing Ikole/Oye Federal Constituency in the House of Representatives. He hails from Ekiti State. He was elected into the House of Assembly at the 2015 elections under the Peoples Democratic Party (PDP).
