= 1999 Nigerian House of Representatives elections in the Federal Capital Territory =

Federal Capital Territory elections, Nigeria

The 1999 Nigerian House of Representatives elections in Federal Capital Territory was held on February 20, 1999, to elect members of the House of Representatives to represent Federal Capital Territory, Nigeria.

== Overview ==
| Affiliation | Party | | Total |
| Affiliation | ANPP | PDP | Total |
|---|---|---|---|
| Before Election | | | 2 |
| After Election | - | 2 | 2 |

== Summary ==
| District | Party | Elected Senator | Party |
|---|---|---|---|
| Abaji/Gwagwalada/Kwali/Kuje | | Yusuf Baban Takwa | PDP |
| Amac/Bwari | | Prince Nicholas Ukachukwu | PDP |

== Results ==
=== Abaji/Gwagwalada/Kwali/Kuje ===
Party candidates registered with the Independent National Electoral Commission to contest in the election. PDP candidate Yusuf Baban Takwa won the election.

1999 Nigerian House of Representatives election in Federal Capital Territory
| Party | Candidate | Votes | % |
|---|---|---|---|
| PDP | Yusuf Baban Takwa | | |
| Total votes | | | |
| PDP hold | | | |

=== Amac/Bwari ===
Party candidates registered with the Independent National Electoral Commission to contest in the election. PDP candidate Prince Nicholas Ukachukwu won the election.

2003 Nigerian House of Representatives election in Federal Capital Territory
| Party | Candidate | Votes | % |
|---|---|---|---|
| PDP | Prince Nicholas Ukachukwu | | |
| Total votes | | | |
| PDP hold | | | |
