= David Brigidi =

Nigerian politician

David Cobbina Brigidi

Senator for Bayelsa Central
- In office May 1999 – May 2007
- Succeeded by: Emmanuel Paulker

Personal details
- Born: Bayelsa State, Nigeria
- Died: 30 September 2018

David Cobbina Brigidi, a lawyer by profession, was elected Senator for the Bayelsa Central constituency of Bayelsa State, Nigeria at the start of the Nigerian Fourth Republic, running on the People's Democratic Party (PDP) platform. He took office on 29 May 1999. He was reelected in April 2003, again on the PDP platform. After taking his seat in the Senate in June 1999 he was appointed chairman of the senate committee on Petroleum also he was a member of other committees; Public Accounts, Environment, Establishment, Labour, Federal Character, Social Development & Sports, Economic Affairs and INEC.

After leaving office in 2007, Brigidi became Chairman of the Presidential Peace and Conflict Resolution Committee, to resolve the Niger Delta Conflict. In July 2008 he called for immediate demobilisation, rehabilitation and reorientation of the Niger Delta militants. He also recommended a review of the environment, saying that "most farmlands and fishing ponds have been polluted as a result of oil exploration activities." He recommended using a special allocation of oil revenue to improve infrastructure in the Delta region. His tenure as chairman of this committee ended in August 2009 and the committee was replaced with the existing Presidential Amnesty Programme.

He is a member of the board of the governing council of University of Ibadan.

He is engaged in private business with interest in oil and gas, tourism, aviation, consultancy, human capital development/training and legal services. Some of his businesses include: Kariela Oil & Gas Nigeria, Kariela Hotels & Resort Ghana, Kariela Oil & Gas Ghana, Re-Routine Air Limited, Adef Energy Services, Shores & Savannah (Law Partners) and South Field Petroleum. He sits on the board of these companies as chairman.
