= 1999 Nigerian House of Representatives elections in Katsina State =

Katsina State elections, Nigeria

The 1999 Nigerian House of Representatives elections in Katsina State was held on February 20, 1999, to elect members of the House of Representatives to represent Katsina State, Nigeria.

== Overview ==
Affiliation	Party		Total
Affiliation	ANPP	PDP	Total
Before Election			15
After Election	-	15	15

== Summary ==
District	Party	Elected Senator	Party
Dutsin-Ma/Kurfi		Sabiu Hasan	PDP
Bindawa/Mani		Musa Aliyu	PDP
Rimi/Charanchi/Batagarawa		Muazu lemanu Tsegero	PDP
Musawa/Matazu		Abubakar G. Shehu	PDP
Mashi/Dutse		Abdu Haro Mashi	PDP
Baure/Zango		Shuaib Yahaya	PDP
Kaita/Jibia		Musa Nuhu A.	PDP
Daura/Sadanmu		Adamu Saidu	PDP
Kankia/Kusada/Ingawa		Usman Mani Nassarawa	PDP
Bakori/Danja		Tukur I. Nasabo	PDP
Malumfashi/Kafur		Aminu Bello M.	PDP
Funtua/Dandume		B. Lawal Ibrahim	PDP
Safana/Batsari/D/M		Aminu Yakubu	PDP
Kankara/Faskari/Sabuwa		Lawal Yusuf Y.	PDP
Katsina		Abubakar S. Yar’adua	PDP

== Results ==
=== Dutsin-Ma/Kurfi ===
Party candidates registered with the Independent National Electoral Commission to contest in the election. PDP candidate Sabiu Hasan won the election.

1999 Nigerian House of Representatives election in Katsina State
Party	Candidate	Votes	%
PDP	Sabiu Hasan		
Total votes			
PDP hold			

=== Bindawa/Mani ===
Party candidates registered with the Independent National Electoral Commission to contest in the election. PDP candidate Musa Aliyu won the election.

2003 Nigerian House of Representatives election in Katsina State
Party	Candidate	Votes	%
PDP	Musa Aliyu		
Total votes			
PDP hold			

=== Rimi/Charanchi/Batagarawa ===
Party candidates registered with the Independent National Electoral Commission to contest in the election. PDP candidate Muazu lemanu Tsegero won the election.

1999 Nigerian House of Representatives election in Katsina State
Party	Candidate	Votes	%
PDP	Muazu lemanu Tsegero		
Total votes			
PDP hold			

=== Musawa/Matazu ===
Party candidates registered with the Independent National Electoral Commission to contest in the election. PDP candidate Abubakar G. Shehu won the election.

2003 Nigerian House of Representatives election in Katsina State
Party	Candidate	Votes	%
PDP	Abubakar G. Shehu		
Total votes			
PDP hold			

=== Mashi/Dutse ===
Party candidates registered with the Independent National Electoral Commission to contest in the election. PDP candidate Abdu Haro Mashi won the election.

1999 Nigerian House of Representatives election in Katsina State
Party	Candidate	Votes	%
PDP	Abdu Haro Mashi		
Total votes			
PDP hold			

=== Baure/Zango ===
Party candidates registered with the Independent National Electoral Commission to contest in the election. PDP candidate Shuaib Yahaya won the election.

2003 Nigerian House of Representatives election in Katsina State
Party	Candidate	Votes	%
PDP	Shuaib Yahaya		
Total votes			
PDP hold			

=== Kaita/Jibia ===
Party candidates registered with the Independent National Electoral Commission to contest in the election. PDP candidate Musa Nuhu A. won the election.

1999 Nigerian House of Representatives election in Katsina State
Party	Candidate	Votes	%
PDP	Musa Nuhu A.		
Total votes			
PDP hold			

=== Daura/Sadanmu ===
Party candidates registered with the Independent National Electoral Commission to contest in the election. PDP candidate Adamu Saidu won the election.

2003 Nigerian House of Representatives election in Katsina State
Party	Candidate	Votes	%
PDP	Adamu Saidu		
Total votes			
PDP hold			

=== Kankia/Kusada/Ingawa ===
Party candidates registered with the Independent National Electoral Commission to contest in the election. PDP candidate Usman Mani Nassarawa won the election.

1999 Nigerian House of Representatives election in Katsina State
Party	Candidate	Votes	%
PDP	Usman Mani Nassarawa		
Total votes			
PDP hold			

=== Bakori/Danja ===
Party candidates registered with the Independent National Electoral Commission to contest in the election. PDP candidate Tukur I. Nasabo won the election.

2003 Nigerian House of Representatives election in Katsina State
Party	Candidate	Votes	%
PDP	Tukur I. Nasabo		
Total votes			
PDP hold			

=== Malumfashi/Kafur ===
Party candidates registered with the Independent National Electoral Commission to contest in the election. PDP candidate Aminu Bello M. won the election.

1999 Nigerian House of Representatives election in Katsina State
Party	Candidate	Votes	%
PDP	Aminu Bello M.		
Total votes			
PDP hold			

=== Funtua/Dandume ===
Party candidates registered with the Independent National Electoral Commission to contest in the election. PDP candidate B. Lawal Ibrahim won the election.

2003 Nigerian House of Representatives election in Katsina State
Party	Candidate	Votes	%
PDP	B. Lawal Ibrahim		
Total votes			
PDP hold			

=== Safana/Batsari/D/M ===
Party candidates registered with the Independent National Electoral Commission to contest in the election. PDP candidate Aminu Yakubu won the election.

1999 Nigerian House of Representatives election in Katsina State
Party	Candidate	Votes	%
PDP	Aminu Yakubu		
Total votes			
PDP hold			

=== Kankara/Faskari/Sabuwa ===
Party candidates registered with the Independent National Electoral Commission to contest in the election. PDP candidate Lawal Yusuf Y. won the election.

2003 Nigerian House of Representatives election in Katsina State
Party	Candidate	Votes	%
PDP	Lawal Yusuf Y.		
Total votes			
PDP hold			

=== Katsina ===
Party candidates registered with the Independent National Electoral Commission to contest in the election. PDP candidate Abubakar S. Yar’adua won the election.

2003 Nigerian House of Representatives election in Katsina State
Party	Candidate	Votes	%
PDP	Abubakar S. Yar’adua		
Total votes			
PDP hold			
