= Christopher Pere Ajuwa =

Nigerian politician and businessman (1941-2017)

Pere Ajuwa
- Born: Christopher Pere Ajuwa; 23 November 1941; Nigeria
- Died: 31 January 2017 (aged 75)
- Occupations: Engineer, businessman, politician
- Known for: Presidential candidate and Ijaw activisism
- Title: Chief, Doctor
- Spouse: Helen Ajuwa
- Children: Ebiere Irene Ajuwa-Musa, Amaebimo Ebi Esther Ajuwa, Elias Pere Ajuwa, Tare Ajuwa, Layefa Ajuwa

Christopher 'Pere' Ajuwa (23 November 1941 – 31 January 2017) was the first man from the Niger Delta region of Nigeria to run for the office of the President of Nigeria.

== Overview ==
Christopher 'Pere' Ajuwa was born in the state of Bayelsa, located in South Nigeria, in the Niger Delta regions.

In 1993, Pere entered the presidential primaries against Alhaji Bashir Tofa under the party platform of the National Republican Convention (NRC). Subsequently, in 2003 and 2007, he ran for president of Nigeria against President Muhammadu Buhari (2015–2019) under the party platform of All Nigeria People Party (ANPP). Chief Dr. Christopher Pere Ajuwa died in 2017 in Port Harcourt at the age of 76.

== Family and childhood ==
=== Early years ===
Christopher Pere Ajuwa was born on 23 November 1941 to the families of High Chief Pa Ogongolo Vurudu Ajuwa of the Egbesubiri Quarter, and Chief Ma Mrs. Rachael Diriayefa Ajuwa and Erubiri Quarter of Gbaranraun kingdom, in Local Government Area of Southern Ijaw located in the State of Bayelsa.

=== Education ===
Pere attended Ade Oshodi, a primary school in Western-Nigeria, from 1954 to 1960 and earned his First School Leaving Certificate. From 1961 to 1964, he proceeded to Stella Maris College, Okitipupa, in Ondo Local Government Area of Ondo State. He then attended Government College Technical College Ijebu-Ode, Yaba Trade Centre, Lagos and he earned his City and Guide Intermediate in 1968. He then left Nigeria and to attend Yaba Technical College at University of Glasgow, Scotland where he earned his Advanced Technological Certificates in 1975.

Afterwards, in the late 1970s, Pere was at Worcester University, the United Kingdom studying Structural Engineering and other engineering courses and he became British certified Technical Structural Engineer in early 1980.

In 2006, Pere earned a master's degree in Business Administration at the Ekiti State University.

=== Death ===
In the fall of 2016 Pere was diagnosed with late end stage prostate cancer. He returned to his home but withdrew from the public and public functions. He died on Monday, 31 January 2017 at his residence in Port Harcourt.

Governor Seriake Henry Dickson described Pere's death as sad, shocking and a monumental loss to the Government and people of Bayelsa State. Speaking at a funeral service held at the Chief DSP Alamieyeseigha Banquet Hall in Yenagoa, in honour of the deceased, Dickson remarked that Pere's contributions to the socio-economic and political growth of Bayelsa state and Nigeria will be forever remembered.

== Career ==
=== Early career ===
In 1969, Pere was first employed as a Technician with the Western State Water Corporation Ibadan. He then joined Cocoa Research Institute of Nigeria also in Ibadan (CRIN) as a Engineer in charge of the institute's Water Treatment Plant in 1970; he worked for two years. He left that position to pursue education at University of Glasgow in the United Kingdom in the late 1970s.

Returning to Nigeria, Pere became Principal Consulting Engineer, SP Group Engineers in 1977.

He entered private business as a Building Contractor and Petroleum Marketing in the early 1980s. He went on to become Chief Civil Engineer with Prefab Overseas Limited. In 1993, he helped found and run Pere Roberto Nigeria Limited as Company Secretary and became managing director.

=== Political life ===
In 1986, Pere was elected President of the Port Harcourt Chamber of Commerce and Industries.

In 1989 he contested and won the Yenagoa Federal Constituency seat into the then constituent assembly.

In 1992, there was restructuring of the political formations in Nigeria that eventually gave birth to the National Republican Convention (NRC) and the Social Democratic Party (SDP). Pere eventually became a founding member of the NRC and supported Chief Rufus Ada George as the Governor (January 1992 to November 1993) of old Rivers State.

In 1992, Pere was a presidential aspirant on the platform of the defunct National Republican Convention (NRC). Pere was forced to step down for Alhaji Bashiru Torfa who later became the flag Bearer of NRC with Social Democratic Party -SDP presidential candidate Alhaji MKO Abiola ran in the June 12, 1993 Presidential election that was cancelled.

In 1998 and Pere became a founding member of the All People Party (APP) which late metamorphosed into All Nigerian Peoples Party (ANPP).

He ran in the primaries against current president Mohammadu Buhari and lost in 2003 and 2007 respectively. He ran as presidential candidate in presidential election in 2003 and 2007 on the party platform of Liberal Democratic Party of Nigeria (LDPN) and Alliance for Democracy (AD) respectively.

In 2003 he was forced to step down in the All Nigeria Peoples Party (ANPP) when General Mohammadu Buhari, who was picked as the presidential candidate, causing Pere to leave the party. Since the ANPP would not give him the Presidential ticket, he switched sides to the Liberal Democratic Party of Nigeria ( LDPN and emerged its presidential candidate in 2003.

In the buildup to the 2007 election, he went back to the ANPP and was forced to step down for General Mohammadu Buhari. He was later adopted by the Alliance for Democracy as its presidential candidate after the sudden death of the then Presidential candidate, Chief Adebayo Adefarati.

In 2011, he contested to fill the Bayelsa Central Senatorial seat on the platform of ANPP and lost to the ruling PDP candidate.

=== Activist ===
In 2006 Ajuwa led 145 Ijaw communities under the aegis of Ijaw Aborigines to accuse Shell before a joint session of the National Assembly. The National Assembly awarded the communities US$1.5 billion damages as compensation for environmental degradations caused by the company since it began oil exploration in 1956.
