= Michael Ajegbo =

Nigerian lawyer and politician

Michael Ogunejiofo Ajegbo

Attorney-General of the Eastern Region
- In office 1957–Unknown

Vice President of Ibo Union
- In office 1948–Unknown
- In office 1951–1954

Personal details
- Born: Obosi, Anambra, British Nigeria
- Citizenship: Nigerian
- Occupation: Politician; Lawyer

Michael Oguejiofo Ajegbo was a Nigerian lawyer and politician who was Attorney-General of Nigeria's Eastern Region during Nigeria's First Republic.

== Life ==
Ajegbo was born and grew up in Obosi, Anambra State, the son of Ajegbo, a farmer and Mgbonkwo Okunwa. At Obosi, the Church Missionary Society (CMS) had an outpost that managed a primary school where Ajegbo attended, after graduation, CMS awarded him a scholarship to attend Dennis Memorial Grammar School, Onitsha. He completed his Junior Cambridge certification at Dennis, thereafter, secured employment as a clerk with the Customs Department in Lagos in 1929. Ajegbo worked with the Customs department from 1929 to 1943, prior to resigning from the department in 1943, he was transferred from Lagos to Port Harcourt. In Port Harcourt, he joined the local affiliate of the Ibo Federal Union and also began to study for the London Matriculation which he passed in 1943. Between 1943 and 1947, Ajegbo was a law student at London University, shortly after passing the bar in 1947, he returned to Nigeria and settled in Onitsha.

As a lawyer, Ajegbo was involved in the nationalist movement, in 1948, he defended Onitsha branch members of the Zikist Movement against charges brought by the colonial government, a year later, he was an attorney representing the coal miners union of Enugu in a judicial commission of inquiry into a shooting incident of miners in Enugu. Ajegbo became a Vice-President of the newly formed Ibo State Union in 1948 and was an active member of the settlers association in Onitsha.

When Africans had the opportunity to elect local government officials in 1951, Ajegbo won a seat on the Niger County Council, he was chairman of the new council from 1951 until 1954, then was elected to the newly reformed local authority, the more inclusive Onitsha Urban District Council with membership open to natives and settlers which was under the presidency of the Obi of Onitsha. The council later-on initiated the construction of the Onitsha Market funded by a loan from the regional development board.

In 1956, Ajegbo and his fellow lawyer colleagues from NCNC defended Azikiwe during a tribunal of inquiry into the activities of African Continental Bank and its relationship with regional premier, Azikiwe and the Eastern region government. In 1957, he was appointed Attorney-General and member of the Eastern region executive council.
