= Ibiapuye Martyns-Yellowe =

Nigerian politician

Soala Ibiapuye Martyns-Yellowe

Senator for Rivers West
- In office 29 May 1999 – 29 May 2007
- Succeeded by: Wilson Asinobi Ake

Personal details
- Born: 12 November 1945 Degema LGA, Rivers State, Nigeria
- Died: 1 July 2009 (aged 63)

Soala Ibiapuye Martyns-Yellowe was elected Senator for the Rivers West constituency of Rivers State, Nigeria at the start of the Nigerian Fourth Republic, running on the People's Democratic Party (PDP) platform. He took office on 29 May 1999. He was reelected in April 2003.

Martyns-Yellowe was born on 12 November 1945 in Bakana, Degema Local Government Area, Rivers State. He qualified as a neuro-psychiatrist, and served as chief medical director of the Rivers State Psychiatric Hospital, Rumuigbo, Port Harcourt. After taking his seat in the Senate in June 1999 he was appointed to committees on Drug & Narcotics, Petroleum (Chairman) and Health. In 2007, he was a contender in the PDP primary election to be candidate for Rivers State governor. He died in Abuja on 2 July 2009 after a severe asthmatic attack.
