= 1999 Nigerian Senate elections in Kebbi State =

1999 Nigerian Senate election in Kebbi State

The 1999 Nigerian Senate election in Kebbi State was held on February 20, 1999, to elect members of the Nigerian Senate to represent Kebbi State. Adamu Augie representing Kebbi North and Yahaya Abubakar Abdullahi representing Kebbi North won on the platform of All Nigeria Peoples Party, while Danladi Bamaiyi representing Kebbi South won on the platform of the Peoples Democratic Party.

== Overview ==
Affiliation	Party		Total
Affiliation	PDP	ANPP	Total
Before Election			3
After Election	1	2	3

== Summary ==
District	Incumbent	Party	Elected Senator	Party
Kebbi North			Adamu Augie	ANPP
Kebbi North			Yahaya Abubakar Abdullahi	ANPP
Kebbi South			Danladi Bamaiyi	PDP

== Results ==
=== Kebbi North ===
The election was won by Adamu Augie of the All Nigeria Peoples Party.

1999 Nigerian Senate election in Kebbi State
Party	Candidate	Votes	%
ANPP	Adamu Augie		
Total votes			
ANPP hold			

=== Kebbi North ===
The election was won by Yahaya Abubakar Abdullahi of the All Nigeria Peoples Party.

1999 Nigerian Senate election in Kebbi State
Party	Candidate	Votes	%
ANPP	Yahaya Abubakar Abdullahi		
Total votes			
ANPP hold			

=== Kebbi South ===
The election was won by Danladi Bamaiyi of the Peoples Democratic Party.

1999 Nigerian Senate election in Kebbi State
Party	Candidate	Votes	%
PDP	Danladi Bamaiyi		
Total votes			
PDP hold			
