= Chris Adighije =

Nigerian politician

Senator for Abia Central Senatorial District
- In office 3 June 2003 – 5 June 2007
- Preceded by: Bob Nwannunu
- Succeeded by: Nkechi Justina Nwaogu

Pro-Chancellor and Chairman of the Council, Federal University Lokoja
- Incumbent
- Assumed office July 2020

Personal details
- Born: Chris Iheanyichukwu Adighije; 22 March 1945 (age 81) Abia State, Nigeria
- Party: Peoples Democratic Party
- Occupation: Politician, geologist

Chris Iheanyichukwu Adighije is a Nigerian politician and lawmaker. He served as a senator representing the Abia Central Senatorial District in the National Assembly.

== Early life and career ==
Adighije was born on March 22, 1945, in Abia State. He earned a Bachelor of Science (B.Sc) degree in Geology from the University of Ibadan in 1973. He subsequently obtained a Master of Philosophy (MPhil) in 1976 and a PhD in 1978, both from the University of Ibadan.

Adighije held various positions during his career. He was Federal Commissioner for Abia State at the Revenue Mobilization and Fiscal Commission (RMAFC) from 2010 to 2015. He served as Senator for Abia Central Senatorial District from 2003 to 2007. He was also National Treasurer of the National Republican Convention (NRC) from 1990 to 1992 and Secretary of the Nigerian National Congress (NNC) from 1988 to 1989.

In July 2020, he was appointed Pro-Chancellor and Chairman of the Council at Federal University Lokoja.
