= Mary Durojaye =

British basketball player (born 1990)

Personal information
- Born: 14 July 1990 (age 36) London, United Kingdom
- Listed height: 1.85 m (6 ft 1 in)

Career information
- Playing career: 2008–present
- Position: Forward

Career history
- ?: Harringey Angels
- 2008-2012: R. Morris Colonials
- 2012: Trogylos Priolo
- 2012-2013: Pall. Muraltese
- 2013: Abbey Leopards

Mary Adeola Temitope Asake Durojaye, or simply Mary Durojaye, (born 14 July 1990 in London, United Kingdom) is a British female professional basketball player of Nigerian descent.
