= Stella Omu =

Nigerian politician

Senator of the Federal Republic of Nigeria from Delta South Senatorial District
- In office May 1999 – May 2003
- Succeeded by: James Manager

Personal details
- Born: December 22, 1946 (age 79)
- Party: PDP
- Spouse: Paul Omu
- Children: 6

Stella Unuezi Omu (born 22 December 1946) is a Nigerian politician who was elected Senator on the People's Democratic Party (PDP) platform in 1999 for the Delta South Senatorial District of Delta State.

== Background ==
Omu is of Isoko origin. She was born on 22 December 1946. Her husband is retired Major-General Paul Omu, formerly Military Governor of South-Eastern State, Nigeria. She is the mother of three daughters and three sons. She was an assistant Comptroller General of the Nigerian Immigration Service, and retired from the civil service as Controller of the Prisons Service. She was a member of the committee on devolution of power constituent assembly (1994–95).

== Senate career ==
Omu was elected Senator on the People's Democratic Party platform in 1999 for the Delta South constituency. She was appointed chief whip of the Senate and vice-chairman of the Senate committees on National Planning and on Women Affairs & Youth Development. In May 2001, Omu denied allegations of financial impropriety against the Senate led by Anyim Pius Anyim, maintaining that they were unfounded and would have been discovered by auditors if real.

In November 2001, she received a letter containing a suspicious powdery substance, with the logo of the Federal Ministry of Communications. Other National Assembly members later received similar letters. This caused alarm as lawmakers suspected the substance to be anthrax, an agent of biological terrorism. Letters tainted with anthrax had recently been reported in United States after the 11 September 2001 terrorist attacks. In June 2002, after a supreme court ruled that the National Assembly did not have the power to make laws for the governance of the local governments, Omu started the process of amending the relevant provisions of the 1999 constitution.

In August 2002, she was a target of attack by senators who distrusted her close relationship with President Obasanjo and her statement that the one-day election clause in the Electoral Bill 2002 might be reversed. She resigned at the end of the month. She ran for the PDP nomination for reelection in 2003, but lost to James Manager, a former Delta State commissioner for Works in the James Ibori cabinet.

== Later career ==
In June 2003, Omu called on the national Assembly to quickly pass the bill for the establishment of National Agency for the Social Welfare of Nigeria Citizens. While in office she had jointly sponsored the bill with Senators Omololu Meroyi and Lekan Salami. In an August 2003 interview, she urged all the warring groups in Warri to lay down their arms, saying that Ijaws and Itsekiris are brothers and should not allow political differences or other socio-economic factors to separate them. In December 2005, she was chair of a Presidential Committee investigating a jail break in Port Harcourt. She also served as a member of the National Political Reform Conference in 2005. In September 2008 she was a member of the Niger Delta Technical Committee.

Omu was a member of a committee set up by the National Executive Committee (NEC) of the Peoples Democratic Party (PDP) to review why the party lost the 2019 presidential election.
