= Fidelis Okoro =

Nigerian politician

Fidelis C. Okoro

Senator of the Federal Republic of Nigeria from Enugu North Senatorial District
- In office 29 May 1999 – 29 May 2007
- Succeeded by: Ayogu Eze

Personal details
- Born: Iheagu, Nru Nsukka, Enugu State, Nigeria
- Party: People's Democratic Party (PDP)
- Other political affiliations: Alliance for Democracy

Fidelis C. Okoro is a Nigerian politician who was Senator for the Enugu North Senatorial District of Enugu State at the start of the Nigerian Fourth Republic, running on the Alliance for Democracy (AD) platform. He took office on 29 May 1999.

After taking his seat in the Senate in June 1999, Okoro was appointed to committees on Senate Services, Industries (chairman), Police Affairs, Agriculture and Niger Delta. He changed allegiance to the People's Democratic Party (PDP) and became an ally of Governor Chimaroke Nnamani. In December 2001, he was named in an assault suit by Chief Mike Ejinima, an aspirant to become governor, along with Nnamani, Ike Ekweremadu and David Atigwe, a member of the Enugu State House of Assembly. He was reelected in April 2003 on the PDP ticket.
