= All People's Party (Nigeria) =

Political party in Nigeria

The All People's Party (APP) is a former Nigerian political party. It was formed in late 1998 during a transition from military to civilian rule by a coalition of associations that received considerable support under the regime of Sani Abacha.

Most of the party's support came from the middle belt region and parts of the north.

Following gubernatorial elections in January 1999, the People's Democratic Party (PDP) emerged as the dominant political party. As a result, the APP and another party – the Alliance for Democracy (AD) – formed a coalition to contest the upcoming presidential election. Olu Falae of the AD was chosen as the coalition's presidential candidate, while Umaru Shinkafi of the APP was chosen as his running mate.

In the 20 February 1999 legislative elections, the APP won 20 out of 109 Senate seats and 68 out of 360 seats in the House of Representatives. The presidential election, held on 29 February 1999, was won by PDP candidate Olusegun Obasanjo. He received 62.78% of the vote compared to 37.22% for the Falae/Shinkafi ticket.

Thereafter, the APP suffered a factional split and contested the next round of elections in 2003 as the All Nigeria People's Party (ANPP).
