= Fourth Nigerian Republic =

Current government of Nigeria, since 1999

Federal Republic of Nigeria: Jamhuriyar Tarayyar Najeriya (Hausa); Ọ̀hàńjíkọ̀ Ọ̀hànézè Naìjíríyà (Igbo); Orílẹ̀-èdè Olómìniira Àpapọ̀ Nàìjíríà (Yoruba)
- Flag Coat of arms
- Motto: "Unity and Faith, Peace and Progress"
- Anthem: "Nigeria, We Hail Thee"
- Capital: Abuja; 9.07°N 7.51°E
- Largest city: Lagos
- Official languages: English
- National languages: Hausa; Igbo; Yoruba
- Regional languages: Over 525 languages
- Ethnic groups (2018): 30% Hausa; 15.5% Yoruba; 15.2% Igbo; 6% Fulani; 2.4% Tiv; 2.4% Kanuri; 1.8% Ibibio; 1.8% Ijaw; 19.9% other
- Demonym: Nigerian
- Government: Federal presidential republic
  - President: Bola Tinubu
  - Vice President: Kashim Shettima
  - Senate President: Godswill Akpabio
  - House Speaker: Tajudeen Abbas
  - Chief Justice: Kudirat Kekere-Ekun
- Legislature: National Assembly
  - Upper house: Senate
  - Lower house: House of Representatives

Formation
  - Current constitution adopted: 29 May 1999

Area
  - Total: 923,769 km^{2} (356,669 sq mi) (31st)
  - Water (%): 1.4

Population
  - 2023 estimate: ▲236,747,130 (6th)
  - Density: 249.8/km^{2} (647.0/sq mi) (42nd)
- GDP (PPP): 2024 estimate
  - Total: ▲$1.443 trillion (27th)
  - Per capita: ▲$6,340 (142nd)
- GDP (nominal): 2024 estimate
  - Total: ▼$252.738 billion (53rd)
  - Per capita: ▼$1,110 (167th)
- Gini (2020): ▼35.1 medium inequality
- HDI (2023): ▲0.560 medium (164th)
- Currency: Naira (₦) (NGN)
- Time zone: UTC+01:00 (WAT)
- Date format: dd/mm/yyyy
- Calling code: +234
- ISO 3166 code: NG
- Internet TLD: .ng
Preceded by
Military dictatorship in Nigeria

The Fourth Republic is the current republican government of Nigeria. Since 1999, it has governed the country according to the fourth republican constitution. Nigeria adopted the constitution of the Fourth Republic on 29 May 1999.

== Founding ==
Following the death of the military dictator and de facto ruler of Nigeria General Sani Abacha in 1998, his successor, General Abdulsalami Abubakar, initiated the transition which heralded Nigeria's return to democratic rule in 1999. The ban on political activities was lifted, and political prisoners were released from detention facilities. The constitution was modeled after that of the ill-fated Nigerian Second Republic—which saw the Westminster system of government jettisoned in favor of a system closer to the American presidential system. Political parties were formed, including the People's Democratic Party (PDP), All Nigeria Peoples Party (ANPP), and the Alliance for Democracy (AD), and elections were set for April 1999. In the widely monitored 1999 election, former military ruler Olusegun Obasanjo was elected on the PDP platform. On 29 May 1999, Obasanjo was sworn in as the country's president and commander-in-chief.

In the controversial general election on 21 April 2007, Umaru Yar'Adua of the PDP was elected president. Following the death of Yar'Adua on 5 May 2010, Goodluck Jonathan became the third (and interim) president. The next year, Johnathan won an election that was largely accredited as freer and fairer than all the previous elections of the Fourth Republic. Former dictator Muhammadu Buhari won 28 March 2015 general election, ending sixteen years (1999–2015) of PDP rule. On 29 May 2015, Buhari was sworn in as the president of Nigeria, becoming the first opposition figure to win a presidential election since independence in 1960.

All Progressives Congress (APC) candidate Bola Tinubu won the February 2023 presidential election to succeed Buhari as Nigeria's next president. However, the opposition accused the government of electoral fraud during the polling. On 29 May 2023, Tinubu was sworn in as Nigeria's president.

== Political parties ==
=== Major parties ===
- All Progressives Congress (APC) – ruling party
- People's Democratic Party (PDP) – opposition party

Defunct major opposition

- All People's Party (APP)
- Alliance for Democracy (AD)
- All Nigeria Peoples Party (ANPP)
- Congress for Progressive Change (CPC)

=== Minor parties ===
Accord	A
Action Alliance	AA
Action Democratic Party	ADP
Action Peoples Party	APP
African Action Congress	AAC
African Democratic Congress	ADC
All Progressives Grand Alliance	APGA
Allied Peoples Movement	APM
Boot Party	BP
Labour Party	LP
National Rescue Movement	NRM
New Nigeria Peoples Party	NNPP
Peoples Redemption Party	PRP
Social Democratic Party	SDP
Young Progressive Party	YPP
Zenith Labour Party	ZLP

== Presidents ==
Presidents during the Nigerian Fourth Republic
President	Term	Party
Olusegun Obasanjo	29 May 1999 – 29 May 2007	PDP
Umaru Yar'Adua	29 May 2007 – 5 May 2010	PDP
Goodluck Jonathan	6 May 2010 – 29 May 2015	PDP
Muhammadu Buhari	29 May 2015 – 29 May 2023	APC
Bola Tinubu	29 May 2023 – present	APC

== Constitutional amendments ==
- Third Term Agenda

== See also ==
- First Nigerian Republic (1963–66)
- Second Nigerian Republic (1979–83)
- Third Nigerian Republic (1992–93)
