= Alliance for Democracy (Nigeria) =

Defunct Nigerian political party

- Chairman: Chief Joseph Avazi
- Secretary-General: Hon.Akin Fasogbon
- Founded: 1998
- Headquarters: No. 7 Kwali Close Area 8 Garki, Abuja
- Ideology: Progressivism
- Colours: Green, white and red

Party flag

The Alliance for Democracy (AD) is a progressive opposition political party in Nigeria. It was formed on 9 September 1998. At the 2003 legislative elections, the party won 8.8% of the popular vote and 34 out of 360 seats in the Nigerian House of Representatives and 18 out of 109 seats in the Nigerian Senate. The party was reportedly formed to shore up the stake of the Yoruba people in the Nigerian federation following the annulment of the June 12, 1993 presidential election widely believed to have been won by Chief M. K. O. Abiola, a Yoruba businessman and tycoon.

In 2007, Chief Dr. Christopher Ajuwa, from the Niger Delta region, ran for President of Nigeria under the AD.

The party was embroiled in a leadership tussle between Mojisola Akinfenwa and Adebisi Akande, which lingered until September 2006 when the 'Bisi Akande faction merged with other opposition parties to form the Action Congress party.

== Notable members ==
- Christopher Ajuwa
- Cairo Godson Ojougboh, chairman of the party from 1998 to 1999
- Bashorun Seinde Arogbofa
