= Deputy governor of Osun State =

Second highest-ranking official in the executive branch of Osun State in Nigeria

Deputy Governor of Osun State
- Flag of Osun State
- Incumbent; Kola Adewusi since 27 November 2022
- Executive Branch of the Osun State Government
- Style: Deputy Governor (informal); His Excellency (courtesy)
- Status: Second highest executive branch officer
- Member of: Osun State Executive Branch; Osun State Cabinet
- Seat: Osogbo
- Nominator: Gubernatorial candidate
- Appointer: Direct popular election or, if vacant, Governor via House of Assembly confirmation
- Term length: Four years renewable once
- Constituting instrument: Constitution of Nigeria
- Inaugural holder: Iyiola Omisore (Fourth Republic)
- Succession: First
- Website: www.osunstate.gov.ng

The deputy governor of Osun State is the second-highest officer in the executive branch of the government of Osun State, Nigeria, after the governor of Osun State, and ranks first in line of succession. The deputy governor is directly elected together with the governor to a four-year term of office.

Kola Adewusi is the current deputy governor, having assumed office on 27 November 2022.

== Responsibilities ==
The deputy governor assists the governor in exercising primary assignments and is also eligible to replace a dead, impeached, absent or ill Governor as required by the 1999 Constitution of Nigeria.

== List of deputy governors ==
Name	Took office	Left office	Time in office	Party	Elected	Governor
Clement Adesuyi Haastrup (born 1948)	2 January 1992	17 November 1993	1 year, 319 days	Social Democratic Party	1991	Isiaka Adeleke
Iyiola Omisore (born 1957)	29 May 1999	29 May 2003	4 years	Alliance for Democracy	1999	Adebisi Akande
Olusola Obada (born 1951)	29 May 2003	26 November 2010	7 years, 181 days	Peoples Democratic Party	2003; 2007	Olagunsoye Oyinlola
Titilayo Laoye-Tomori (born 1948)	27 November 2010	27 November 2018	8 years	All Progressives Congress	2014	Rauf Aregbesola
Benedict Alabi (born 1965)	27 November 2018	27 November 2022	4 years	All Progressives Congress	2018	Gboyega Oyetola
Kola Adewusi (born 1958)	27 November 2022	Incumbent	3 years, 284 days	Peoples Democratic Party	2022	Ademola Adeleke

== See also ==
- List of governors of Osun State
