= Adeleke =

- Gender: Male
- Language: Yoruba

Origin
- Origin: Nigeria
- Meaning: The crown/royalty triumphs.
- Region of origin: South West, Nigeria

Adélékè is both a surname and a given name of Yoruba origin, meaning "the crown/royalty triumphs" (a compound of adé "crown, royalty" and lékè "triumph"). It may be shortened to Lékè. Notable people with the name include:

== Given name ==
- Adeleke Adekunle (born 2002), Nigerian footballer
- Adeleke Akinyemi (born 1998), Nigerian footballer
- Adeleke Mamora (born 1953), Nigerian politician
- Adeleke "Leke" Oyede (born 1986), Nigerian cricketer
- Theophilus Adeleke Akinyele (1932–2020), Nigerian business consultant and civil servant

== Surname ==
- Adedeji Adeleke (born 1957), founder and president of Adeleke University
- Ademola Adeleke (born 1960), Nigerian politician
- Ayoola Adeleke (born 1923), Nigerian politician
- David Adedeji Adeleke (born 1992), known as Davido, Nigerian singer, songwriter and record producer
- Dolapo Adeleke (born 1990), Nigerian filmmaker
- Isiaka Adeleke (1955–2017), Nigerian politician
- Kenny Adeleke (born 1983), Nigerian basketball player
- Peter Adeleke, Nigerian-Canadian author and speaker
- Rhasidat Adeleke (born 2002), Irish sprinter
- Samson Adeleke, Nigerian actor
- Seyi Adeleke (born 1991), Nigerian footballer
- Tobi Adeleke (born 2003), Nigerian footballer
- Tunde Adeleke (born 1995), Nigerian-Canadian football player.
