= 1999 Nigerian Senate elections in Osun State =

1999 Nigerian Senate election in Osun State

The 1999 Nigerian Senate election in Osun State was held on February 20, 1999, to elect members of the Nigerian Senate to represent Osun State. Moji Akinfenwa representing Osun East, Sunday Fajinmi representing Osun West and Adebayo Salami representing Osun Central all won on the platform of the Alliance for Democracy.

== Overview ==
| Affiliation | Party | | Total |
| Affiliation | PDP | AD | Total |
|---|---|---|---|
| Before Election | | | 3 |
| After Election | 0 | 3 | 3 |

== Summary ==
| District | Incumbent | Party | Elected Senator | Party |
|---|---|---|---|---|
| Osun East | | | Moji Akinfenwa | AD |
| Osun West | | | Sunday Fajinmi | AD |
| Osun Central | | | Adebayo Salami | AD |

== Results ==
=== Osun East ===
The election was won by Moji Akinfenwa of the Alliance for Democracy.

1999 Nigerian Senate election in Osun State
| Party | Candidate | Votes | % |
|---|---|---|---|
| AD | Moji Akinfenwa | | |
| Total votes | | | |
| AD hold | | | |

=== Osun West ===
The election was won by Sunday Fajinmi of the Alliance for Democracy.

1999 Nigerian Senate election in Osun State
| Party | Candidate | Votes | % |
|---|---|---|---|
| AD | Sunday Fajinmi | | |
| Total votes | | | |
| AD hold | | | |

=== Osun Central ===
The election was won by Adebayo Salami of the Alliance for Democracy.

1999 Nigerian Senate election in Osun State
| Party | Candidate | Votes | % |
|---|---|---|---|
| AD | Adebayo Salami | | |
| Total votes | | | |
| AD hold | | | |
