= List of governors of Osun State =

Listen of governors in osun state

Governor of Osun State
- Flag of Osun State
- Incumbent; Ademola Adeleke since 27 November 2022
- Executive branch of the Osun State Government
- Style: Governor (informal); His Excellency (courtesy)
- Type: Head of state; Head of government
- Member of: Osun State Executive Branch; Osun State Cabinet
- Residence: Osun State Government House
- Seat: Osogbo
- Appointer: Direct popular election or via succession from deputy governorship
- Term length: Four years; renewable once
- Constituting instrument: Constitution of Nigeria
- Inaugural holder: Leo Segun Ajiborisha
- Formation: 27 August 1991 (35 years ago)
- Deputy: Deputy Governor of Osun State
- Website: www.osunstate.gov.ng

The governor of Osun State is the head of government of Osun State in Nigeria. The governor is the head of the executive branch of the Osun State Government. The governor has a duty to enforce state laws and the power to either approve or veto bills passed by the Osun State House of Assembly, to convene the legislature and grant pardons.

When Osun State was created from Oyo State in 1991, Colonel Leo Segun Ajiborisha was appointed its first head of State. Isiaka Adetunji Adeleke was the first civilian governor, serving for two years from 2 January 1992 to November 1993. Bisi Akande served from 1999 to 2003. Olagunsoye Oyinlola served from 2003 to 2010. Rauf Aregbesola served the longest term as governor, serving for two consecutive terms of four years each from 2010 to 2014, and 2014 to 2018. Gboyega Oyetola served from 2018 to 2022.

Since the creation of the state in 1991, ten people have served as governor: four military and six civilian. Ajiborisha served the shortest term in office of four months.

The current governor is Ademola Adeleke, who was sworn in on 27 November 2022.

== Governors ==
=== Military governor (1991–1992) ===
Osun State was created on 27 August 1991, and General Ibrahim Babangida appointed Leo Segun Ajiborisha as military governor.

Governor			Term of office			Party	Ref.
No.	Portrait	Name (birth–death)	Took office	Left office	Time in office	Party	Ref.
1		Colonel; Leo Segun Ajiborisha	27 August 1991	3 January 1992	4 months	Military	

=== Third Republic (1992–1993) ===
Under the 1979 Constitution, the second constitution of the Federal Republic of Nigeria, the governor was head of both state and government. The governor was elected for a four-year term. In the event of a vacancy, the deputy governor would serve as acting governor.

Governor			Term of office			Political party	Elected	Ref.
No.	Portrait	Name (birth–death)	Took office	Left office	Time in office	Political party	Elected	Ref.
2		Isiaka Adeleke (1955–2017)	3 January 1992	17 November 1993	1 year, 318 days	Social Democratic Party	1991	

=== Military administrators (1993–1999) ===
General Sanii Abacha led the palace coup d'ètat of 1993 which overthrew the Third Republic. He appointed his military administrators in December 1993.

Administrator			Term of office			Party	Ref.
No.	Portrait	Name (birth–death)	Took office	Left office	Time in office	Party	Ref.
3		Navy Captain; Anthony Udofia	9 December 1993	22 August 1996	2 years, 8 months	Military	
4		Lieutenant Colonel; Anthony Obi (1952–2022)	22 August 1996	7 August 1998	1 year, 11 months	Military	
5		Colonel; Theophilus Bamigboye (born 1951)	7 August 1998	29 May 1999	9 months	Military	

=== Fourth Republic (1999–present) ===
Under the 1999 Constitution of the Federal Republic of Nigeria, the governor is head of both state and government. The governor is elected for a four-year term. In the event of a vacancy, the deputy governor would serve as acting governor.

Governor			Term of office			Political party	Elected	Ref.
No.	Portrait	Name (birth–death)	Took office	Left office	Time in office	Political party	Elected	Ref.
6		Chief Adebisi Akande (born 1939)	29 May 1999	29 May 2003	4 years	Alliance for Democracy	1999	
7		Olagunsoye Oyinlola (born 1951)	29 May 2003	26 November 2010	7 years, 181 days	Peoples Democratic Party	2003; 2007	
8		Rauf Aregbesola (born 1957)	27 November 2010	27 November 2018	8 years	All Progressives Congress	2014	
9		Gboyega Oyetola (born 1954)	27 November 2018	27 November 2022	4 years	All Progressives Congress	2018	
10		Ademola Adeleke (born 1960)	27 November 2022	Incumbent	3 years, 328 days	Peoples Democratic Party	2022	

== See also ==
- States of Nigeria
- List of state governors of Nigeria
