= Adebayo Salami =

Nigerian politician and accountant (1951–2021)

Senator for Osun Central
- In office 3 June 1999 – 3 June 2003
- Succeeded by: Felix Kolawole Ogunwale

Chairman of Olorunda Local Government
- In office December 1990 – September 1991

Personal details
- Born: Adebayo Ayoade Salami; 26 July 1951 Osogbo, Southern Region, British Nigeria (now in Osun State, Nigeria)
- Died: 7 January 2021 (aged 69) New York City, New York, U.S.
- Party: Alliance for Democracy; All Progressives Congress
- Spouses: Ayisat Abosede Salami; Muslimat Folasade Salami
- Children: 5
- Education: Kwara State College of Technology (OND); Yaba College of Technology (HND); Imo State University (MBA)
- Occupation: Politician; accountant

Adebayo Ayoade Salami (26 July 1951 – 7 January 2021) was a Nigerian accountant and politician who served as Senator representing the Osun State Central constituency at the start of the Nigerian Fourth Republic running on the Alliance for Democracy (AD) platform.

After taking his seat in the Senate in June 1999, he was then appointed to committees on Public Accounts, Labor (vice-chairman), Power & Steel and Water Resources. In a May 2001 debate over importing beans from Burkina Faso, he was in the minority when he argued that whatever could be done to feed Nigerians and make food affordable to the people should be done.

Salami died in the United States on 7 January 2021.

== Early life and education ==
Adebayo Ayoade Salami was born on 26 July 1951, at his family home in Osogbo.

=== Parents ===
Adebayo's father was Busari Oladiti Salami, A well respected sanitary inspector that later became known as one of the political strategists for Osogbo. His mother, Rafatu Ayinke was a very industrious woman during her early days in life. She was both a trader and contractor in the days of ECN (Energy Commission of Nigeria) and NEPA (National Electric Power Authority).

=== Early education ===
"Amusa," as he was called as a child, which is the Yoruba domestication of the Islamic name Hamzat, attended Saint Michael's Primary School, Ilobu in today's Irepodun Local Government Area of Osun State. For his secondary school education, the young Amusa Adebayo Salami attended Ife-Olu Grammar School, and later, Akinorun grammar school Ikirun where he had his West African School Certificate in 1969. Then called Adebayo, he attended Oduduwa College in Ile-Ife for his Higher School Certificate Course between 1970 and 1971.

=== Higher education ===
Adebayo Salami studied accounting at Kwara State College of Technology, Ilorin between 1972 and 1974, and obtained the OND (Ordinary National Diploma). He was at the famous Yaba College of Technology, Lagos, for his HND between 1976 and 1978. Later on in the early 2000s Adebayo received his Master of Business Administration degree from Imo State University.

== National Youth Service Corps ==
Adebayo was mobilized as a member of the National Youth Corps in 1978 and served the mandatory one year of national service as an accountant in the old Kaduna state. Adebayo Salami as a young accountant served at the Federal Government owned National Freight Company in Kaduna between 1978 and 1979. He was so hardworking and effective during his service year that the management of National Freight gave him a job by retaining him after his service year. He worked as a young accountant in that office and soon became the company's principal accountant.

== Entrepreneurship ==
The ambitious young man, Adebayo, later left National Freight Company to set up Aolat Nigeria Limited, a civil engineering and construction firm there in Kaduna. Soon he became a flourishing businessman in town and was fondly called by friends and business associates as, "The Young Millionaire".

== Political career ==
=== Olorunda Local Government Chairman ===
Adebayo Salami began to test the murky waters of Nigeria's politics in 1990 when he contested the post of Local Government Chairman, (Olorunda Local Government) in the 8 December 1990 nation-wide council election and won. Adebayo, now better known as Bayo Salami, won that election on the platform of the National Republican Convention.

In a then dominant Social Democratic Party (SDP) environment that the old Oyo State was, Bayo became one out of the only three Local Government Chairmen the new Osun State had in 1991 upon the state's creation. The two others were Boripe and Ife-North local governments. The remaining local governments were all run by SDP chairmen.

=== Governorship ambition ===
Adebayo Salami won the ticket to become the NRC Governorship candidate for Osun State. He contested the 14 December 1991 governorship election in Osun state but lost narrowly to Isiaka Adetunji Adeleke of the SDP who became the first Governor of the newly formed Osun State in January 1992.

Bayo Salami from that electoral attempt became a known name and face in the politics of Osun.If he lost so narrowly to Isiaka Adeleke when he belonged to the less popular NRC party in the then South West, he could do better if he joined the Progressive Group of Politicians.

The Strategic Bayo Salami weighed his options and teamed up in 1998 with the progressives, led by the late Bola Ige. Hard work and loyalty to a cause won Salami to the hearts of the leaders of his newfound political group. He was given the Osun Central Senatorial ticket to contest as senator.

=== Senate ===
Adebayo won that election in January 1999 and became a senator of the Federal Republic of Nigeria in June 1999. He served in the 4th National Assembly (1999-2003). He was the Vice Chairman of the Senate Committee on Labour and later the chairman of the Senate Committee on Culture and Tourism. At various times he was a member on the senate committees on Public Accounts, Oil and Gas, Defense, Population, and the Federal Capital Territory.

=== All Progressives Congress ===
Senator Adebayo Salami was also the chieftain of All Progressives Congress (APC) representing Osun State before his death in January 2021.

== Personal life ==
He had two wives, several children and grandchildren.
