= 2003 Nigerian Senate elections in Osun State =

2003 Nigerian Senate election in Osun State

The 2003 Nigerian Senate election in Osun State was held on April 12, 2003, to elect members of the Nigerian Senate to represent Osun State. Felix Kola Ogunwale representing Osun Central, Akinlabi Olasunkanmi representing Osun West and Iyiola Omisore representing Osun East all won on the platform of the Peoples Democratic Party.

== Overview ==
Affiliation	Party		Total
Affiliation	PDP	AD	Total
Before Election	0	3	3
After Election	3	0	3

== Summary ==
District	Incumbent	Party	Elected Senator	Party
Osun Central			Felix Kola Ogunwale	PDP
Osun West			Akinlabi Olasunkanmi	PDP
Osun East			Iyiola Omisore	PDP

== Results ==
=== Osun Central ===
The election was won by Felix Kola Ogunwale of the Peoples Democratic Party.

2003 Nigerian Senate election in Osun State
Party	Candidate	Votes	%
PDP	Felix Kola Ogunwale		
Total votes			
PDP hold			

=== Osun West ===
The election was won by Akinlabi Olasunkanmi of the Peoples Democratic Party.

2003 Nigerian Senate election in Osun State
Party	Candidate	Votes	%
PDP	Akinlabi Olasunkanmi		
Total votes			
PDP hold			

=== Osun East ===
The election was won by Iyiola Omisore of the Peoples Democratic Party.

2003 Nigerian Senate election in Osun State
Party	Candidate	Votes	%
PDP	Iyiola Omisore		
Total votes			
PDP hold			
