= 2014 Osun State gubernatorial election =

2014 gubernatorial election in Osun State, Nigeria

- 9 August 2014
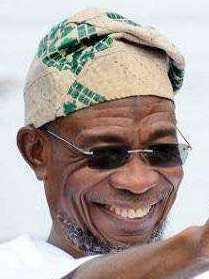

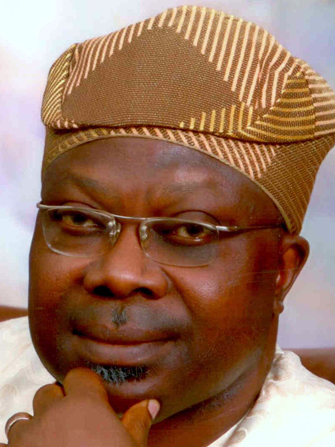
Nominee	Rauf Aregbesola	Iyiola Omisore
Party	APC	PDP
Running mate	Titilayo Laoye-Tomori	Adejare Bello
Popular vote	394,684	292,747
Percentage	56.68%	42.04%
Governor before election
Rauf Aregbesola
APC
Elected Governor
Rauf Aregbesola
APC

The 2014 Osun State gubernatorial election occurred in Nigeria on 9 August 2014, the APC nominee Rauf Aregbesola won re-election, defeating Iyiola Omisore of the PDP.

Rauf Aregbesola emerged APC after he was returned as the sole candidate. He picked Titilayo Laoye-Tomori as his running mate. Iyiola Omisore was the PDP candidate with Adejare Bello as his running mate. 20 candidates contested in the election.

== Electoral system ==
The Governor of Osun State is elected using the plurality voting system.

== Primary election ==
=== APC primary ===
Rauf Aregbesola won the primary election after he emerged unopposed.

=== PDP primary ===
The PDP primary election was held on 5 April 2014. Iyiola Omisore won the primary election polling 1,128 votes against 3 other candidates. His closest rival was Olasunkanmi Akinlabi who scored 45 votes, Wole Oke scored 4 votes while Isiaka Adeleke withdrew.

== Results ==
A total number of 20 candidates registered with the Independent National Electoral Commission to contest in the election.

A total number of 1,407,222 voters registered in the election.

Candidate	Party	Votes	%
Rauf Aregbesola	All Progressives Congress	394,684	56.68
Iyiola Omisore	People's Democratic Party	292,747	42.04
Labour Party	8,898	1.28	
Total		696,329	100.00
Registered voters/turnout		1,407,222	–
Source: Premium Times

=== By local government area ===
Here are the results of the election by local government area for the two major parties. 20 political parties participated in the election. Blue represents LGAs won by Rauf Aregbesola. Green represents LGAs won by Iyiola Omisore.

LGA	Rauf Aregbesola APC		Iyiola Omisore PDP		Total votes
LGA	#	%	#	%	#
Irepodun	13,314		7,386		
Ife Central	9,680		24,555		
Ife East	13,821		20,831		
Ola Oluwa	7,927		4,963		
Ife North	8,603		9,841		
Isokan	9,758		10,028		
Ede North	15,403		10,427		
Ifelodun	17,447		12,442		
Aiyedaade	12,801		11,255		
Obokun	11,696		8,618		
Irewole	18,328		10,330		
Egbedore	10,615		7,024		
Aiyedire	7,724		7,813		
Iwo	20,827		15,493		
Osogbo	39,983		11,513		
Olorunda	26,551		8,483		
Atakunmosa East	9,287		6,294		
Ife South	7,325		12,811		
Ejigbo	17,700		12,495		
Ifedayo	4,225		3,982		
Boluwaduro	4,981		5,035		
Ilesa East	16,106		5,913		
Odo Otin	11,950		12,902		
Ilesa West	15,427		5,449		
Boripe	12,723		9,334		
Orolu	8,558		6,786		
Oriade	12,523		10,214		
Atakunmosa West	6,928		5,142		
Ede South	11,738		7,482		
Ila	10,825		7,916		
Totals	394,684		292,747		
