= Olatunde Ojo =

Government official

Clerk to the National Assembly of Nigeria
- In office 30 September 2020 – February 2023
- Preceded by: Mohammed Sani-Omolori
- Succeeded by: Sani Magaji Tambawal

Personal details
- Born: Ojo Amos Olatunde; 14 February 1963 (age 63) Ilobu, Irepodun, Oyo State, Nigeria
- Education: Obafemi Awolowo University

Ojo Amos Olatunde (born 14 February 1963), is a Nigerian architect and the Former clerk to the National Assembly of Nigeria since 14 February 2023, he previously served as the clerk from 30 September 2020 to 14 February 2023 when he replaced Mohammed Sani-Omolori.

== Early life and education ==
Ojo was born in Ilobu, Irepodun, Oyo State, Nigeria. He had his secondary school education at Ilobu Secondary Commercial Grammar School, where he graduated in 1983. From 1985 to 1990, he went to Obafemi Awolowo University where he graduated with a degree in architecture, before proceeding to obtain a master's degree in 1992 from the same university.

== Career ==
Ojo started his career in private practice, before joining the national assembly of Nigeria in 2004 as the chief architect of department of estate and works. He was promoted to the position of assistant director, after which he became the deputy director and then director. He is a member of Nigerian Institute of Architect, NIA and the Architects Registration Council of Nigeria, ARCON.

== Clerk to the national assembly of Nigeria ==
On 17 July 2020, Ojo was appointed as the acting clerk to the national assembly of Nigeria to replace Mohammed Sani-Omolori. On 30 September 2020, his appointment was made permanent.
