= 2003 Osun State gubernatorial election =

2003 gubernatorial election in Osun State, Nigeria

- (Nigeria)
- 19 April 2003
Nominee	Olagunsoye Oyinlola	Adebisi Akande
Party	PDP	AD
Running mate	Erelu Olusola Obada	Sooko Adewoyin
Popular vote	493,509	237,041
Governor before election
Adebisi Akande
AD
Elected Governor
Olagunsoye Oyinlola
PDP

The 2003 Osun State gubernatorial election occurred on 19 April 2003. PDP's Olagunsoye Oyinlola won election for a first tenure, defeating Incumbent Governor, AD's Adebisi Akande and ANPP's Lai Oriowo.

Olagunsoye Oyinlola won out of over 22 PDP governorship aspirants at the primary election. His running mate was Olusola Obada.

== Electoral system ==
The Governor of Osun State is elected using the plurality voting system.

== Results ==
A total of three candidates registered with the Independent National Electoral Commission to contest in the election. PDP candidate Olagunsoye Oyinlola won election for a first tenure, defeating AD Incumbent Governor, Adebisi Akande, and ANPP's Lai Oriowo.

The total number of registered voters in the state was 1,367,627. However, only 58.63% (i.e. 801,812) of registered voters participated in the excerise.

Candidate	Party	Votes	%
Olagunsoye Oyinlola	People's Democratic Party (PDP)	493,509	67.55
Adebisi Akande	Alliance for Democracy (AD)	237,041	32.45
Lai Oriowo	All Nigeria Peoples Party(ANPP)		
Total		730,550	100.00
Registered voters/turnout		1,367,627	–
Source: Gamji, Africa Update, Dawodu
