= Odunayo Olagbaju =

Nigerian politician

- Born: Odunayo Omobolanle Olagbaju; Nigeria
- Died: December 2001
- Cause of death: Stabbing
- Citizenship: Nigerian
- Occupation: politician

Odunayo Omobolanle Olagbaju was a Nigerian legislator from Osun State. He was stabbed to death in December 2001 right in front of a police station in Ile Ife, Nigeria. In May 2002, eleven suspects were arraigned for the killing. In August, seven additional suspects were arrested. By the end of 2002, the original eleven had been freed on bail, but the incident remained under investigation.

== Killings ==
Odunayo Olagbaju was bludgeoned to death in broad daylight in his Ile-ife home town, sparking riots in which at least five people were reported killed. The dead included a local Alliance for Democracy (AD) chairman. A spokesman for the Ife community, Prince Olakunle Aderemi, said that Olagbaju mentioned a commissioner in the Akande cabinet, a member of the House of Representatives and a member of the State House of Assembly as responsible for the attack before he died "at the doorstep of Nigeria Police, Moore, Ile-Ife".

== Motive for killings ==
The killing may have been related to a quarrel between governor Bisi Akande of Osun State and deputy governor Iyiola Omisore. Odunayo Olagbaju was a staunch supporter of Iyiola Omisore. The murder was followed a few days later by the killing of Bisi Akande's supporter, Bola Ige, the Justice Minister of Nigeria. After an emergency cabinet meeting, the Nigerian government deployed troops to prevent further violence.

One of the suspects in the Bola Ige murder said Iyiola Omisore had become close to Olagbaju, and under-wrote a part of his campaign expenses. Sometime in 2001, Iyiola Omisore told Odunayo Olagbaju that he was crossing over to the People's Democratic Party (PDP), which would back him as candidate for the Osun State governorship. Odunayo Olagbaju and all of Omisore's supporters also crossed over. In August 2003, Chief Joseph Obadare of the PDP said that Olagbaju alerted the police about threats to his life but the police refused to come to his rescue before his assassins struck.

== Conviction and release ==
The two people convicted in connection with the killing were given a prerogative pardon by the governor of Osun state Rauf Aregbesola, during his one-year anniversary in office.

== See also ==
- List of unsolved murders (2000–present)
- Tunde Eso
