= Odunayo =

- Gender: Female
- Language: Yoruba

Origin
- Origin: Nigeria
- Meaning: 'festival of joy'
- Region of origin: Southwestern region

Odunayo (Yoruba: Ọdúnayọ̀, pronounced [ɔ̄dṹ.ājɔ̀]) is a Nigerian given name which means 'festival of joy'.

== Notable people with the name ==
- Odunayo Adekuoroye (born 1993), Nigerian wrestler
- Odunayo Olagbaju (died 2001), Nigerian politician
- Odunayo Eweniyi, Nigerian business executive and activist
- Israel Mobolaji Temitayo Odunayo Oluwafemi Owolabi Adesanya (born 1989), Nigerian-New Zealand mixed martial artist and former kickboxer
