= Aregbesola =

Nigerian given name

- Gender: Male
- Language: Yoruba

Origin
- Origin: Nigerian
- Meaning: One who finds wealth in company
- Region of origin: South-west Nigeria

Other names
- Variant form: Aregbeshola

AregbesolaArẹ́gbẹ́sọlá is a Nigerian surname of Yoruba origin meaning "One who finds wealth in company". The name is derived from the components “a” (one who), “rí” (find), “ẹgbẹ́” (companions or contemporaries), “ṣe” (make), and “ọlá” (wealth), with the morphological structure a-rí-ẹgbẹ́-ṣe-ọlá. A variant of this name is Arẹ́gbẹ́shọlá.

Notable people with the surname include:

- Rauf Aregbesola (born 1957), Nigerian politician
