= Inle =

Inle may refer to:

- Inlé, an album
- Inle Lake, a lake in Burma
- Inle, Aunglan, a village in Aunglan Township, Burma
- Inle, Thayet, a village in Thayet Township, Burma
- Inle (Santería), a character in Santería mythology
