= Mudasiru Oyetunde Hussein =

Nigerian politician

Senator for Osun West
- In office 6 June 2011 – 6 June 2015
- Preceded by: Isiaka Adeleke
- Succeeded by: Isiaka Adeleke

Member of House of Representatives of Nigeria
- In office 3 June 1999 – 5 June 2007
- Constituency: Oshodi-Isolo

Personal details
- Party: All Progressives Congress
- Profession: Politician

Mudasiru Oyetunde Hussein is a Nigerian politician who represented the Alliance for Democracy for two terms (1999–2007) in the House of Representatives. He was elected Senator for Osun West in Osun State, Nigeria in the April 2011 national elections, running on the Action Congress of Nigeria (ACN) platform.

== Background ==
Hussein was born in Ejigbo in Osun state.

== Political career ==
Hussein was elected as a representative for Oshodi-Isolo in Lagos State in 1999 as a member of the Alliance for Democracy party, and was reelected in 2003.

In February 2004, Mudasiru Hussein said that the House might invite President Olusegun Obasanjo to explain where he got N360million that was said to have been spent on demolishing all the toll gates in the country. In November 2004, Hussein stated that the rising numbers of military politicians in the nation's polity would bring virile and stable democracy. In June 2005, Mudasiru Hussein called for the discovery of those behind the murder of one of the major financiers of the Oranmiyan group, Alhaji Hassan Olajokun, as essential to ensure Nigeria's nascent democracy would survive. The same month, Mudasiru Hussein said agitation for increase in resource control would be eliminated by the "Mineral Resources Commission Bill", which would allow regions to take care of their resources. In January 2006, Mudashiru Hussein said the Nigerian constitution did not allow for a third term for President Olusegun Obasanjo.

Standing for the Action Congress in the 2007 senate elections for Osun West, he was defeated by Isiaka Adetunji Adeleke. Hussein appealed the election decision, presenting evidence that included video clips showing ballot boxes being taken away by thugs and voters being threatened with dangerous weapons, but the tribunal did not consider this sufficient to overturn the result.

In the April 2011 senate elections for Osun West Husain received 121,971 votes, with the incumbent Senator Adeleke of the PDP coming second with 77,090 votes.

Following the death of Senator Isiaka Adeleke, he contested in a bye election which took place in 2017 under the platform of the All Progressives Congress. He lost to the deceased younger brother Ademola Adeleke who is known as the "dancing senator".
