= 2007 Osun State gubernatorial election =

- 14 April 2007
Nominee	Olagunsoye Oyinlola	Rauf Aregbesola
Party	PDP	ACN
Popular vote	426,669	240,722
Governor before election
Olagunsoye Oyinlola
PDP
Elected Governor
Olagunsoye Oyinlola
PDP

The 2007 Osun State gubernatorial election was the 4th gubernatorial election of Osun State. Held on 14 April 2007, the People's Democratic Party nominee Olagunsoye Oyinlola won the election, defeating Rauf Aregbesola of the Action Congress of Nigeria.

The election was challenged by the Action Congress and its candidate, Rauf Aregbesola, at the Election Petition Tribunal and the Appeal Court. Aregbesola was subsequently pronounced duly elected on November 26, 2010, by the Appeal Court sitting in Ibadan.

== Results ==
Olagunsoye Oyinlola from the People's Democratic Party won the election, defeating Rauf Aregbesola from the Action Congress of Nigeria. Registered voters were 1,297,297.

2007 Osun State gubernatorial election
Party	Candidate	Votes	%	±%
PDP	Olagunsoye Oyinlola	426,669	0	
ACN	Rauf Aregbesola	240,722	0	
PDP hold				
