= Erinlẹ =

Deity in the Yoruba religion

- Earth, Natural force of Universe, Hunting
- Member of Orisha
- Other names: Erinle
- Venerated in: Yoruba religion, Umbanda, Candomble, Santeria, Haitian Vodou, Folk Catholicism
- Region: Nigeria, Benin, Latin America
- Ethnic group: Yoruba

In the Yoruba tradition, Erinlẹ was a great hunter who became an orisha.

He is said to have conducted the first Olobu of Ilobu to the site of the town of Ilobu, and to have protected the people of the town from Fulani invasions. He is usually described as a hunter but sometimes as a herbalist or a farmer. It is said that one day he sank into the earth near Ilobu and became a river. He is known all over Yorùbáland. The cult of Erinlẹ is found in towns throughout the former Oyo Empire. His shrines contain smooth, round stones from the Erinlẹ River. The name may be derived from erin (elephant) and ilẹ (earth), or from erin and ile (house). He is known as Inle by the Lukumi in Cuba and as Ode Inle, and sometimes as Oxossi Ibualamo in Brazilian Candomblé. The Erinlẹ River, a tributary of the Osun River, takes his name.
