= Sunday Fajinmi =

Nigerian politician and entrepreneur (born 1952)

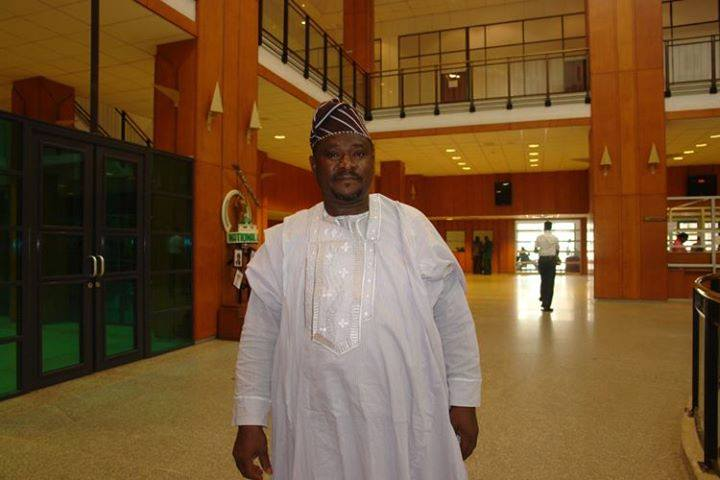

Senator for Osun West
- In office 3 June 1999 – 3 June 2003
- Succeeded by: Akinlabi Olasunkanmi

Personal details
- Born: Sunday Olawale Fajinmi; 16 November 1952 (age 73) Osun State, Nigeria
- Party: Alliance for Democracy
- Education: Teesside University
- Occupation: Politician; entrepreneur
- Website: senatorsundayfajinmi.com

Sunday Olawale Fajinmi (born 16 November 1952) is a Nigerian politician and an entrepreneur.

== Education ==
Fajinmi completed his higher education at Teesside University and went on to provide national services as a member of the National Youth Service Corps (NYSC) while employed at Nigeria Airways.

== Career ==
Fajinmi was elected Senator for the Osun West constituency of Osun State, Nigeria at the start of the Nigerian Fourth Republic, running on the Alliance for Democracy (AD) platform. He took office on 29 May 1999.

== Political career ==
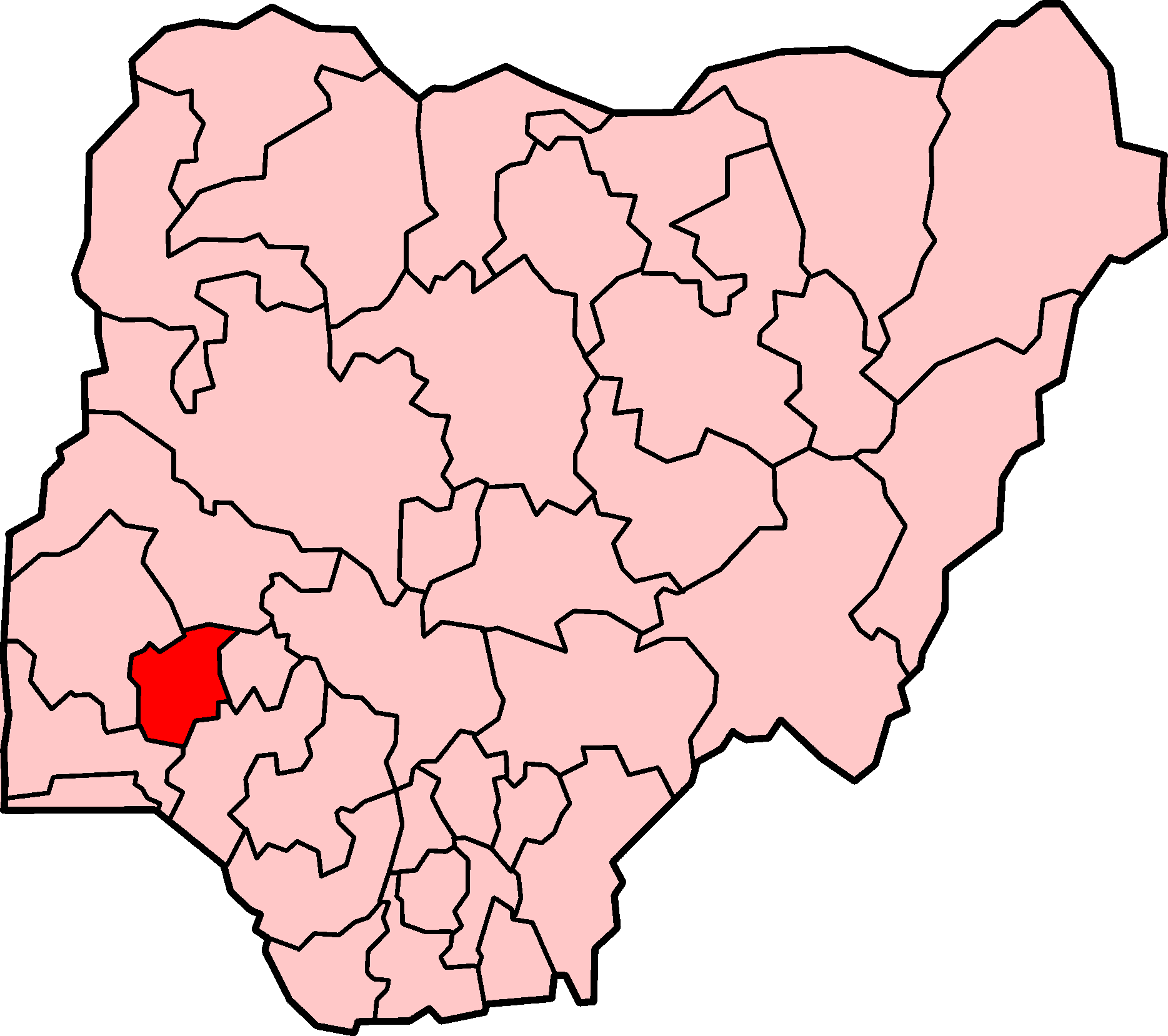
Osun State, Nigeria

Senator Sunday Olawale Fajinmi was elected a Senator in 1998 representing Osun west senatorial district on the platform of the United Nigeria Congress Party (UNCP) during General Sani Abacha's military regime. After democracy was restored, in June 1999 he was again elected Senator, Osun west on the platform of the Alliance for Democracy beating Isiaka Adetunji Adeleke of the People's Democratic Party.

While in the senate, he was appointed to the Science & Technology, Transport, State & Local Government (Vice Chairman), Information, Government Affairs and Economic Affairs committees. In December 2005 he moved over to the ruling Peoples Democratic Party (PDP).

Fajinmi was the Alliance for Democracy gubernatorial candidate in the 9 August 2014 Osun State election.
