= 1999 Osun State gubernatorial election =

1999 gubernatorial election in Osun State, Nigeria

- January 9, 1999
Nominee	Adebisi Akande
Party	AD	All People's Party (Nigeria)
Popular vote	295,557	136,105
Governor before election
Isiaka Adeleke
SDP
Elected Governor
Adebisi Akande
AD

The 1999 Osun State gubernatorial election occurred in Nigeria on January 9, 1999. The AD nominee Adebisi Akande won the election, defeating the APP candidate.

Adebisi Akande emerged AD candidate.

== Electoral system ==
The Governor of Osun State is elected using the plurality voting system.

== Primary election ==
=== AD primary ===
The AD primary election was won by Adebisi Akande.

== Results ==
The total number of registered voters in the state was 1,496,058. Total number of votes cast was 547,077, while number of valid votes was 536,252. Rejected votes were 10,825.

Candidate	Party	Votes	%
Adebisi Akande	Alliance for Democracy	295,557	68.47
All People's Party	136,105	31.53	
Total		431,662	100.00
Valid votes		431,662	97.55
Invalid/blank votes		10,825	2.45
Total votes		442,487	100.00
Registered voters/turnout		1,496,058	29.58
Source: Nigeria World, IFES, Semantics Scholar
