= Adebisi Akande =

Nigerian politician (born 1939)

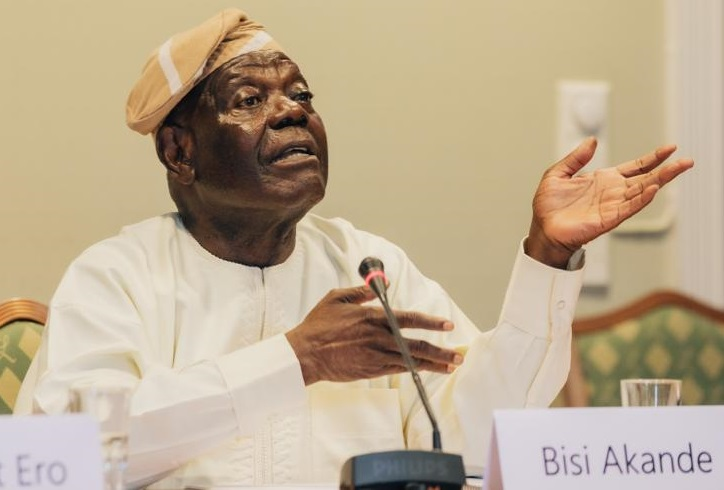
- Akande in 2019

Governor of Osun State
- In office 29 May 1999 – 29 May 2003
- Deputy: Iyiola Omisore
- Preceded by: Theophilus Bamigboye
- Succeeded by: Olagunsoye Oyinlola

Deputy Governor of Oyo State
- In office 1982 – 1 October 1983
- Governor: Bola Ige
- Preceded by: Sunday Afolabi
- Succeeded by: Olatunji Mohammed

Personal details
- Born: 16 January 1939 (age 87) Ila Orangun, Southern Region, British Nigeria (now in Osun State, Nigeria)
- Party: All Progressives Congress
- Occupation: Politician
- Website: bisiakande.com

Chief Abdulkareem Adebisi Bamdele Akande, CFR (born 16 January 1939), is a Nigerian politician who served as the governor of Osun State from 1999 to 2003, as a member of the Alliance for Democracy (AD) party. Following his governorship, he served for eleven consecutive years (2003–2014) as the National Chairman of the Alliance for Democracy, the Action Congress (AC), and the Action Congress of Nigeria (ACN). He subsequently became the founding Interim National Chairman of the ruling party, the All Progressives Congress (APC).

Akande previously served as the Secretary to the State Government and later as the deputy governor of Oyo State from 1982 to 1983 during the Second Nigerian Republic, under Governor Bola Ige, following the resignation of Sunday Afolabi. In October 2022, he was conferred with the Nigerian National Honour of Commander of the Order of the Federal Republic (CFR).

== Background ==
Chief Adebisi Bamidele Akande is the Asiwaju of Ila Orangun, Osun State, Nigeria.

=== Early life and education ===
Akande was born on January 16, 1939, in Ila Orangun. He began his early career as a primary school teacher, serving as a pioneer educator in the Western Region's Free Education Programme launched by Chief Obafemi Awolowo. He later pursued training in accountancy, eventually becoming a Fellow of the Chartered Institute of Cost and Management Accountants (FCMA).

=== Corporate career ===
Between 1963 and 1979, Akande worked for British Petroleum (BP) Nigeria Limited as an accountant. He progressed through the corporate ranks to become the Manager of Systems and Computer Services. In 1979, he was released on a leave of absence by the company to enter full-time public service in the old Oyo State.

== Governorship ==
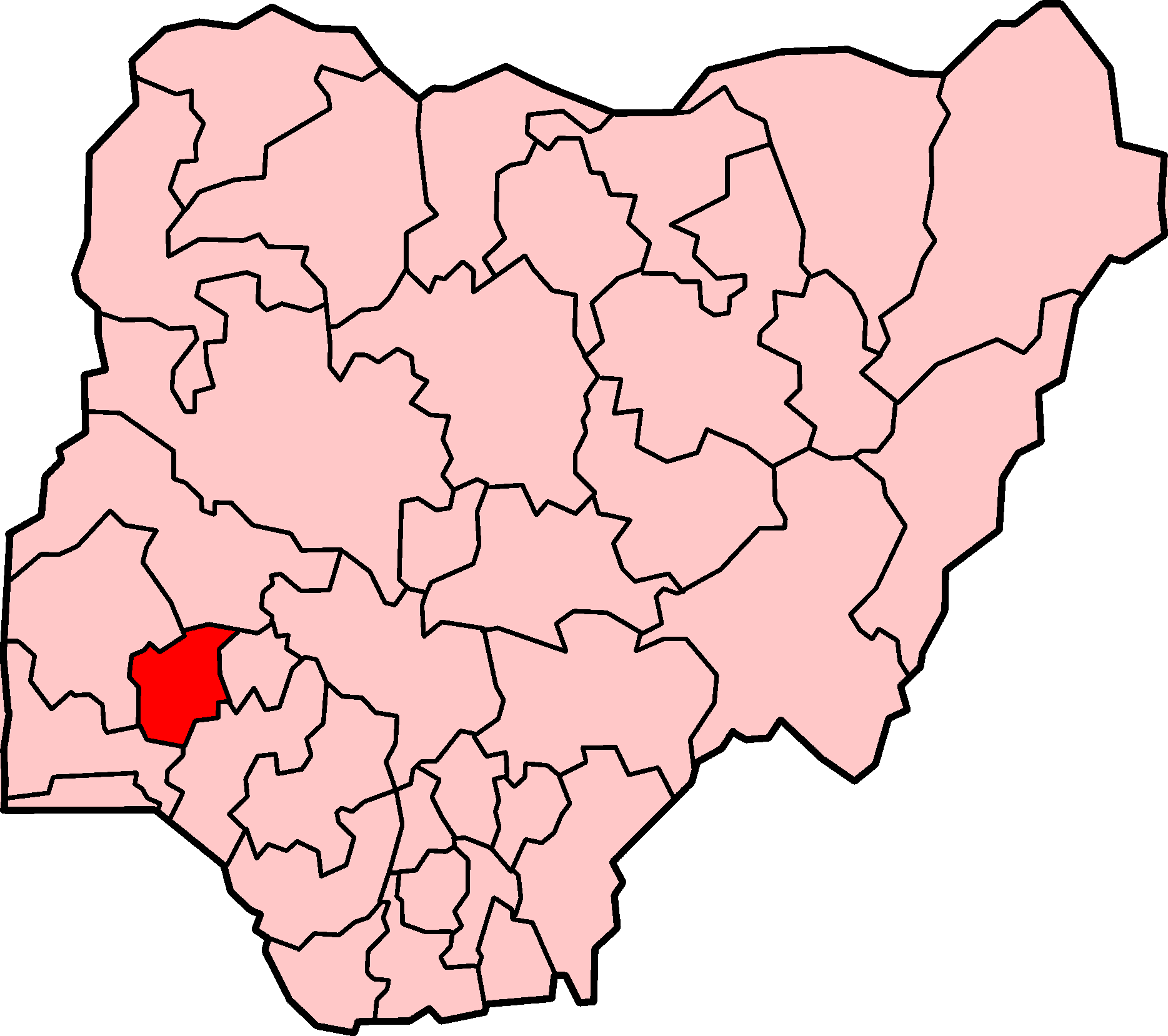
Osun State, Nigeria

Akande was elected governor of Osun State in the 1999 Osun State gubernatorial election, under the platform of Alliance for Democracy (AD), which had been recently formed as a political arm of the Yoruba socio-cultural organization Afenifere. He succeeded Col. Theophilus Bamigboye, who had been the military administrator of the State from August 1998, and who handed over power on 29 May 1999. On 31 May 1999, Akande inaugurated the second Assembly in Osun State.

In January 2000, the Osun State government sacked 143 staff of the Osun State Broadcasting Corporation, following the governor's earlier vow to trim the state's work force. Akande dissolved the state Council of Obas and Chiefs in 2001, on the ground that it was too large. The dissolution may have been caused by a dispute between the then head of the royal council, the Ooni of Ile-Ife and Akande, in turn part of a face-off between Akande and the deputy governor, Iyiola Omisore.

A November 2001 appraisal of Osun State said that Akande was battling an unfriendly work force, and the state was also troubled by long-standing violence between the Ife and Modakeke clans. However, Akande had implemented his party's programs for providing free education and free medical care, and had improved water supplies. A different appraisal, two months later, noting the governor had recently survived an impeachment attempt, said that rather than improving social services and generating employment, after two years in power Akande had implemented massive staff lay offs in the public service, and had caused virtual collapse of public infrastructure.

On 24 December 2001, Akande's supporter, Bola Ige, the minister of justice, was murdered in his house in Ibadan. This Day newspaper said that the murder could have been linked to the feud between Akande and the deputy governor, Iyiola Omisore. The murder followed another murder the previous week of Osun State legislator Odunayo Olagbaju, who was bludgeoned to death outside his home. Olagbaju was a supporter of Omisore.

Akande ran for re-election in 2003, but was defeated by Prince Olagunsoye Oyinlola and Erelu Olusola Obada of the People's Democratic Party (PDP).

== Later career ==
In late 2003, rival factions of the AD held separate conventions. In the Lagos convention, Akande was elected as AD chairman. In January 2006, the convoy of AD leaders who supported Chief Mojisoluwa Akinfenwa faction instead of Akande as the party's national chairman was attacked by thugs in Osogbo, the capital of Osun State. In a February 2006 interview, former Senator Moji Akinfenwa verbally attacked Akande and denied that he was head of the AD. Discussing Akande's feud with his deputy, Iyiola Omisore, he acknowledged that most of the funding for Akande's governorship campaign was donated by Omisore, but said it was a serious error to have accepted him as a running mate.

In June 2005, Akande attended an International Conference on Sustainable Democracy in Nigeria held at the Imperial College, London. In October 2005, Akande visited the US to meet with AD supporters in the Nigerian diaspora.

Speaking in July 2006, Akande attacked the Economic and Financial Crimes Commission, which he implied was not acting impartially. He defended the AD, which he said was stronger even than it had been in 1999. He called for a more decentralized, federal form of government.

Speaking in February 2009, Akande said the only solution to hostage-taking in the Niger Delta area was to give youths employment opportunities, and to involve them in decision making. He cautioned against a military solution, saying in the past the military had looted the nation's treasury and impoverished the people. Speaking in favour of democracy, he stated that when the AD governors accepted President Olusegun Obasanjo's request to avoid local council polls, they fell into a trap. Obasanjo was able to select delegates who helped him win the 2003 elections.

In October 2009, the Osun State Commissioner for Education, Alhaji Jelili Adesiyan, blamed the poor performance of Osun State students in examinations on the administration of Akande, who he asserted had neglected the schools.

In September 2006, the Akande faction merged with other opposition parties to form the Action Congress Party, which later changed its name to the Action Congress of Nigeria.

In February 2013, the party announced plans to merge with the Congress for Progressive Change (CPC), the All Nigeria Peoples Party (ANPP), and a faction of All Progressives Grand Alliance (APGA) to form the All Progressives Congress (APC).

== See also ==
- Tunde Eso
