= Titilayo Laoye-Tomori =

Nigerian politician (born 1948)

Deputy Governor of Osun State
- In office 27 November 2010 – 27 November 2018
- Governor: Rauf Aregbesola
- Preceded by: Olusola Obada
- Succeeded by: Benedict Alabi

Osun State Commissioner for Education
- In office 2010 – November 2018
- Governor: Rauf Aregbesola

Personal details
- Born: 21 December 1948 (age 77) Osogbo, Southern Region, British Nigeria (now in Osun State, Nigeria)
- Party: All Progressives Congress (2013–present)
- Other political affiliations: Action Congress of Nigeria (before 2013)
- Spouse: Michael Ponnle (m. 2019)
- Education: University of Lagos
- Occupation: Politician; Public Administrator

Titilayo Laoye-Tomori (born 21 December 1948) is a Nigerian politician, she served as deputy governor of Osun State and commissioner for education from 2010 to 2018.

== Early life and education ==
Laoye-Tomori was born in Osogbo, Osun State, to the Amon Oyeyemi Laoye family. She was educated in Owo at St. Catherine Girls Grammar School and at Victory College in Ikare before continuing to the University of Lagos, generally known as UNILAG, where she graduated with a bachelor's degree in history in year 1973. She earned a postgraduate diploma in education in 1978 and a Masters in Public Administration in 1984.

== Career ==
After graduating and spending one year in the National Youth Service Corps, she was employed as an education officer at the Federal Ministry of Education in 1974. She worked there for six years before joining the University of Lagos as an assistant registrar. She was the Principal Assistant Registrar by the time she left in 1989. While at the university she also served as a faculty officer, establishment officer and admissions officer.

She went on to work with Coopers & Lybrand International, PFM Consulting Limited, and Industrial and General Insurance Plc. She also started her own consulting company, Quints Management Consultants. She was appointed to the board of International Health Management Services Limited, a health maintenance organization (HMO) as an executive director overseeing finance and administration.

As part of the Action Congress of Nigeria party, she was a candidate for deputy governor to Ogbeni Rauf Adesoji Aregbesola in 2007. A Court of Appeals judgment put them into office after a three year court case.

== Personal life ==
She is married with four children and nine grandchildren. In 2019, at age 70, she married MiCom owner Prince Michael Ponnle, who was 80 years old.
