= Ayoola Adeleke =

Nigerian politician

Balogun Ayoola Adeleke

Senator of the Federal Republic of Nigeria from Old Oyo Senatorial District 11
- In office 1 October 1979 – 31 December 1983

Personal details
- Born: 27 December 1923 Oyo State, Nigeria
- Citizenship: Nigeria
- Party: National Party of Nigeria
- Relations: Davido (Grandson)
- Children: Isiaka Adeleke, Adedeji Adeleke, Ademola Adeleke

Chief Raji Ayoola Adeleke (born 27 December 1923) was a Nigerian politician and labour activist. He was a second republic Senator who represented Old Oyo State Senatorial District 11 which comprises six present day Local Governments in Osun State: Ede, Osogbo, Irepodun, Ifelodun, Odo Otin, and Ila Orangun.

== Background and education ==
Adeleke was born in his hometown of Ede on 27 December 1923. His mother, Madam Adeboyin of OniIegogoro's compound was a former Iyalode (Head of market women) in Ede. Between 1935 and 1938 Adeleke attended St Peter's Primary School, Ede, Osun and later Ibadan Grammar School graduating in 1943. In 1947 he earned a registered nurse certificate. He was a pioneer member of the Union of Nigerian nurses in 1948.

== Career ==
In his lifetime he was the Vice-president, United Labour Congress of Nigeria, Director, Organisation Federal Labour Advisory Council, and Chairman, Nigerian Red Cross, Ede, Osun Branch. In 1976, he was conferred with the title of Balogun of Ede. Under the Unity Party of Nigeria He was elected senator in the 1979 Nigerian parliamentary election and represented Old Oyo State Senatorial District 11.

== Personal life ==
Adeleke was married twice, his second wife, Mrs. Nnena Esther Adeleke was from the Abia State. He had five children including Isiaka Adeleke, Adedeji Adeleke, and Ademola Adeleke.
