= Ìṣẹ̀ṣe Day =

Annual cultural and Yoruba celebration

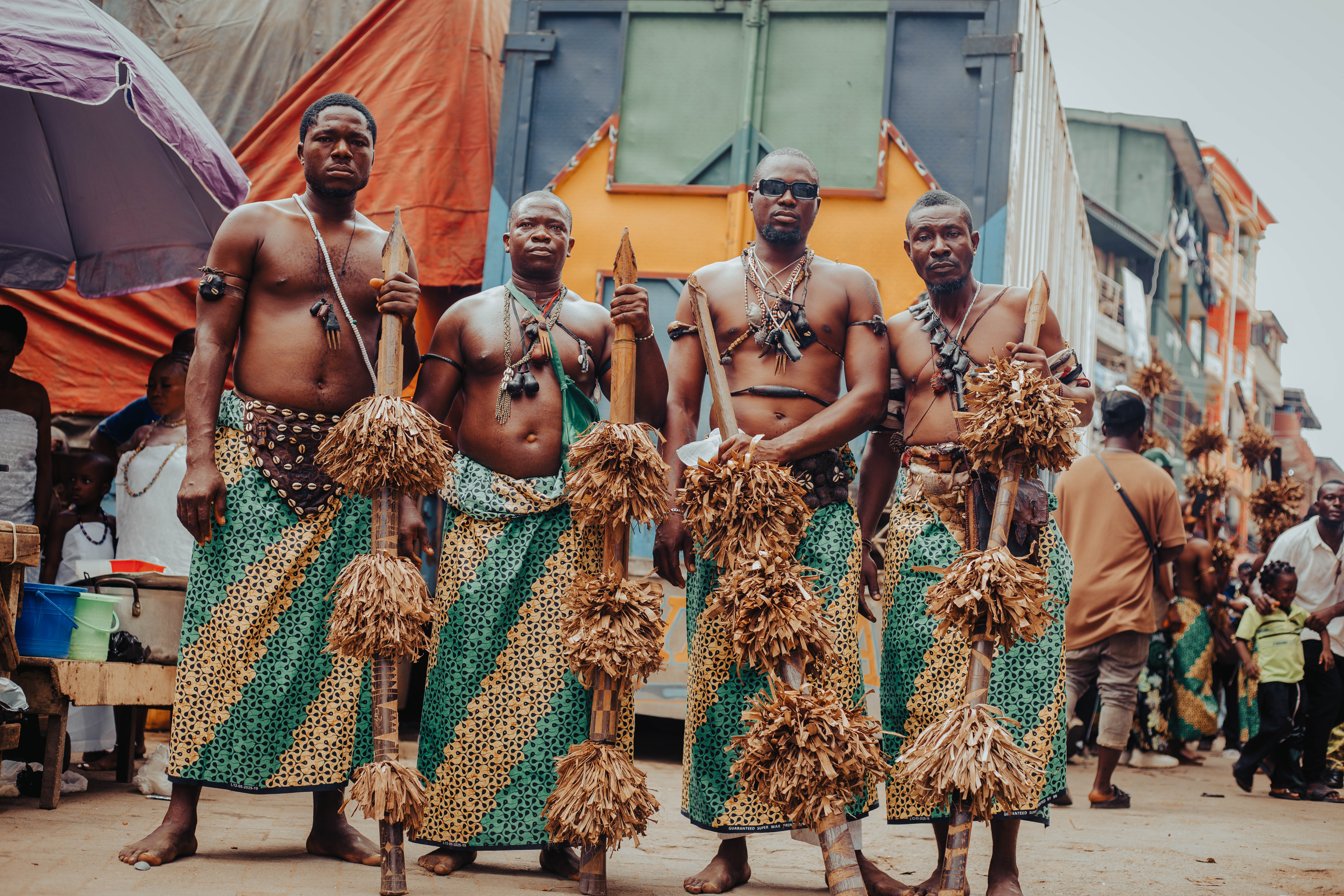
- Isese Day participants in Lagos state
- Language: Yoruba

Origin
- Meaning: Tradition
- Region of origin: South West, Nigeria

Ìṣẹ̀ṣe Day or Isese Day is an annual cultural and religious celebration observed by practitioners of the Yoruba religion and enthusiasts of Yoruba cultural values and traditional institutions primarily in southwestern Nigeria. The day is dedicated to honoring Yoruba Orishas, as well as preserving the heritage and customs of the Yoruba people.

== Name ==
The term Ìṣẹ̀ṣe translates to "tradition" in Yoruba. The concept of 'Isese Day' is therefore not limited to just the spiritual or religious aspect of Yoruba existence, but also to the mundane cultural norms, traditional institutions, understanding of morality, family values, community, values, oral traditions, festivals, ancestry and oral literature [i.e Ìtàn (history), oriki (praise poetry), Àlọ́ (folktales), Òwe (proverbs), Ewì (oral poetry), Orin (songs) Etc.] that developed within Yoruba societies long before the emergence of modern religious and socio-political structures. Isese day provides an avenue for Individuals as well as religious and cultural institutions to celebrate and reflect on these elements of their tangible and intangible cultural heritage.

== History ==
Ìṣẹ̀ṣe day was formally established to recognize and advocate for the preservation of Yoruba traditions in the modern era. The recognition and associated celebration was first declared a public holiday in Osun State in August 2014, under the administration of Governor Rauf Aregbesola. Since then, other southwestern states such as Lagos (following a formal request by the Lagos state council of Obas and chiefs), Ogun, and Oyo have since 2023 officially recognized August 20 as Isese Day, often declaring it a work-free day for public servants such as teachers and government workers.

The day is officially recognized as a public holiday in several southwestern Nigerian states, with government offices closed to allow adherents to observe the celebration.
