= Executive Council of Osun State =

Nigerian state cabinet

The Osun State Executive Council (also known as the Cabinet of Osun State) is the highest formal governmental body that plays important roles in the Government of Osun State headed by the Governor of Osun State. It consists of the Deputy Governor, Secretary to the State Government, Chief of Staff, Commissioners who preside over ministerial departments, and the Governor's special aides.

== Functions ==
The Executive Council exists to advise and direct the Governor. Their appointment as members of the Executive Council gives them the authority to execute power over their fields.

== Current cabinet ==
The current Executive Council is serving under the Ademola Adeleke administration which was inaugurated as the 10th Governor of Osun State on November 27, 2022.

Meanwhile, the governor of Osun can from time to time appoint new members into the cabinet, such as the recently appointed special adviser on economic planning (Hon. Adekola Abisoye Adediran)

Office	Incumbent
Governor	Ademola Adeleke
Deputy Governor	Prince Kola Adewusi
Secretary to the State Government	Alhaji Teslim Igbalaye
Head of Service	Olusegun Aina
Chief of Staff	Alhaji Kazeem Akinleye
Attorney General & Commissioner For Justice	Jimi Bada Esq
Commissioner For Agriculture & Food Security	Hon Tola Faseru
Commissioner For Commerce, Industry & Co-operative	Rev. Bunmi Jenyo
Commissioner For Environment & Sanitation	Hon. Mayowa Adejonrin
Commissioner For Finance	Mr. Shola Ogungbile
Commissioner of Health	Barrister Jola Akintola
Commissioner For Culture & Tourism	Hon. Ojo Fafa Abiodun
Commissioner For Information & Civil Orientation	Kolapo Alimi Esq
Commissioner For Lands, Physical Planning & Urban Development	Hon. George Alabi
Commissioner For Local Government & Chieftaincy Affairs	Dosu Babatunde Esq
Commissioner For Regional Integration & Special Duties	Dr. B.T Salam
Commissioner For Women Affairs & Children	Mrs Ayo Awolowo
Commissioner For Youth, Sports & Special Needs	Prince Kola Adewusi
Commissioner For Innovation, Science & Technology	Hon. Olatunji Dele Maruff Ayofe
Commissioner For Transport	Hon. Olusesan Oyedele
Commissioner For Federal Matters	Mrs. Adenike Folasade Adeleke
Commissioner For Rural Development & Community Affairs	Alh. Ganiyu Olaoluwa Asejere
Commissioner For Political Affairs & Intergovernmental Relations	Hon. Biyi Odunlade
Commissioner For Home Affairs	Hon. Aderibigbe Rasheed
Commissioner For Water Resources & Energy	Hon. Olufemi Oroniyi
Commissioner For Human Resource	.....
Commissioner For Economy Planning & Budget	Prof. Moruf Ademola Adeleke
Commissioner For Education	Hon. Eluwole Sunday Adedipo
Special Adviser on Innovation, Science, Technology and Digital Economy	Hon. Azeez Badmus
Special Adviser on Transport	Hon Moshood Yakubu
Special Adviser on Rural & Community Development	Hon Moji Omisore
Special Adviser On Public Health	Dr Adekunle Akindele
Special Adviser on Tax Matters	Hon Kamoru Ajisafe
Special Adviser on Legislative Matters	Hon Ropo Oyewole
Special Adviser on Investment (OSICOL)	Hon Emiola Fakeye
Special Adviser on Sdgs	Bank Omisore
Special Adviser on Legal Matters	Hashim Abioye Esq
Spokesperson/Special Adviser	Mallam Olawale Rasheed
