= 1991 Osun State gubernatorial election =

1991 gubernatorial election in Osun State, Nigeria

Osun gubernatorial election
- December 14, 1991
Nominee	Isiaka Adeleke
Party	SDP
Elected Governor
Isiaka Adeleke
SDP

The 1991 Osun State gubernatorial election occurred on December 14, 1991. SDP candidate Isiaka Adeleke won the election.

== Conduct ==
The gubernatorial election was conducted using an open ballot system. Primaries for the two parties to select their flag bearers were conducted on October 19, 1991.

The election occurred on December 14, 1991. SDP candidate Isiaka Adeleke won the election.
