= Samson Adetayo Adeleke =

Samson Adetayo Adeleke, also known as MC Fantasy, is a Nigerian-American prominent master of ceremonies, actor and filmmaker. He is the founder of Fantasy Global LLC. Active in the entertainment industry since 2014, Fantasy has gained recognition for his work on various platforms.

== Background ==
MC Fantasy was born in Lagos, Nigeria where he grew up. He attended Ikotun Comprehensive College in 1995-2001 for his secondary education before enrolling at Lagos State University in 2004 to attain a Bachelor's degree in Biochemistry in 2009. In 2014, he relocated to the United States and completed a Master’s degree in Chemistry from Western Illinois University, Macomb, Illinois (2014-2016).

MC Fantasy's career began in 2014 and includes notable performances such as AY Live in Chicago in 2022. He was an executive producer and actor for the film Fantasy Island.

In addition to his work in entertainment, Fantasy founded a non-governmental foundation aimed at preventing, treating, and rehabilitating heart-related health issues, seeking to inspire healthier lifestyles within the community.

In 2024, he launched a book titled My Anecdotes: A Comedian’s Resilience.
