= Leo Segun Ajiborisha =

Nigerian politician

Major General Leo Segun Ajiborisha

Military Administrator of Osun State
- In office 27 August 1991 – 1 January 1992
- Preceded by: Abdulkareem Adisa (Oyo State)
- Succeeded by: Isiaka Adetunji Adeleke

Military service
- Allegiance: Nigeria
- Branch/service: Nigerian Army
- Rank: Major General

Leo Segun Ajiborisha served as the first Administrator of Osun State, Nigeria after it was created from part of Oyo State in August 1991 during the military regime of General Ibrahim Babangida.

== Career ==
One of Ajiborisha's first actions as Osun Governor was to establish the Osun State Broadcasting Corporation. The radio channel based in Ile-Ife came on air on 25 November 1991 He inaugurated the Osun State Civil Service Commission on 30 September 1991. He handed over to the elected civilian governor Isiaka Adetunji Adeleke in January 1992 at the start of the Nigerian Third Republic.

Later he became Director of Operations, Defence Headquarters, and then Principal Staff Officer to General Abdulsalami Abubakar (1998–1999). As a former military administrator, he was required to retire from the army in June 1999 at the start of the Nigerian Fourth Republic,

In April 2008 the Economic and Financial Crimes Commission cleared Leo Ajiborisa of allegations of corrupt practices related to acquisition of an oil block by two Lagos-based companies. In 2010, he was President and Chairman-in-Council of the Institute of Strategic Management, Nigeria.
