= Akinlabi Olasunkanmi =

Nigerian politician and businessman (born 1956)

Federal Minister of Youth Development
- In office 26 July 2007 – March 2010
- Preceded by: S. A. Jakanda
- Succeeded by: Bolaji Abdullahi

Senator for Osun West
- In office 3 June 2003 – 5 June 2007
- Preceded by: Sunday Fajinmi
- Succeeded by: Isiaka Adeleke

Personal details
- Born: March 1956 (age 69–70) Ode-omu, Western Region, British Nigeria (now in Osun State, Nigeria)
- Party: Peoples Democratic Party

Akinlabi Olasunkanmi (born March 1956) is a Nigerian businessman and politician who was appointed minister for youth development in the cabinet of President Umaru Yar'Adua in July 2007. In 2014, he ran as a Peoples Democratic Party (PDP) candidate for governor of Osun State but was defeated in the primary round.
