= Rauf Aregbesola =

Nigerian politician (born 1957)

Ogbeni Rauf Aregbesola
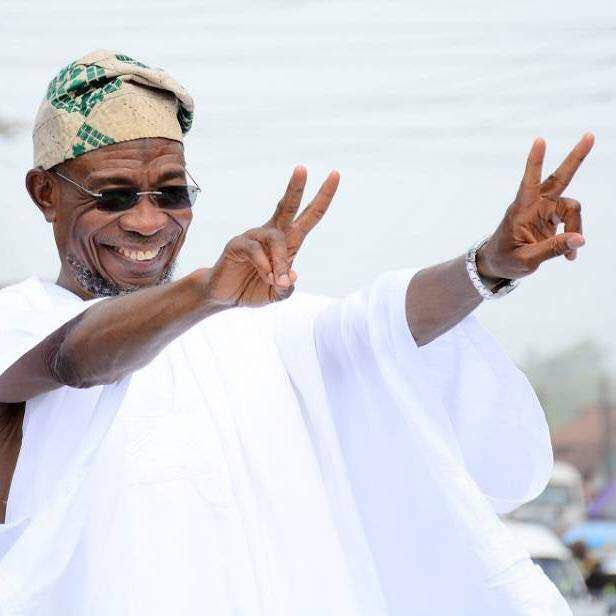
- Governor of the State of Osun, Ogbeni Rauf Aregbesola raises both hands in victory sign during a project inspection tour across the state in September 2017

Minister of the Interior
- In office 21 August 2019 – 29 May 2023
- President: Muhammadu Buhari
- Preceded by: Abdulrahman Dambazau
- Succeeded by: Olubunmi Tunji-Ojo

Governor of Osun State
- In office 27 November 2010 – 27 November 2018
- Deputy: Titilayo Laoye-Tomori
- Preceded by: Olagunsoye Oyinlola
- Succeeded by: Adegboyega Oyetola

Personal details
- Born: Rauf Adesoji Aregbesola; 25 May 1957 (age 69) Ilesa, Western Region, British Nigeria (now in Osun State, Nigeria)
- Party: African Democratic Congress
- Other political affiliations: Action Congress of Nigeria (before 2013) All Progressives Congress (2013–2025)
- Spouse: Sherifat Aregbesola
- Education: The Polytechnic, Ibadan
- Occupation: Politician; engineering technologist

Ogbeni Rauf Adesoji Aregbesola (born 25 May 1957) is a Nigerian politician who served as the minister of the Interior of Nigeria from 2019 to 2023. He previously served as governor of Osun State from 2010 to 2018. He is currently the interim national secretary of the African Democratic Congress (ADC) after his defection from the APC to the party in 2025.

== Early life and education ==
Aregbesola is a Muslim born into a family of both Muslims and Christians. He had his primary and secondary education in Ondo State. He later attended The Polytechnic, Ibadan, where he studied Mechanical Engineering Technology and graduated in 1980. There have been several dispute about Aregbesola's professional qualification. The Polytechnic, Ibadan which he attended, awards National Diploma and Higher National Diploma in Mechanical Engineering Technology, therefore a graduate of the school can only be an engineering technologist, according to COREN's Engineering Cadres in Nigeria.

== Early involvement in politics ==
Aregbesola's interest and involvement in politics dates back to his undergraduate days when he was Speaker of the Students' Parliament (1977–1978) at The Polytechnic, Ibadan, and the President of the Black Nationalist Movement (1978–1980). He was also an active supporter of other progressive students' movements nationwide, which earned him, for instance, a life membership in the National Association of Technological Students. In June 1990, he became an elected delegate to the Social Democratic Party Inaugural Local Government Area Congress. In July of the same year, he was also a delegate to its first National Convention in Abuja. Aregbesola, as a pro-democracy and human rights activist, was a major participant in the demilitarization and pro-democracy struggles of the 1990s in Nigeria.

Upon the return of the country to democratic rule in 1999, he was a ranking member of the Alliance for Democracy, led by Senator Bola Tinubu, who would go on to become governor of Lagos State in the same year. Aregbesola was Director of the Bola Ahmed Tinubu Campaign Organisation (BATCO), who drove the electoral victory of Bola Tinubu in 1999, and he performed a similar feat with the platform of the Independent Campaign Group, with which he ensured the re-election of Tinubu for a second term in office.

=== Commissioner of Works and Infrastructure ===
Upon Tinubu's inauguration as governor, Aregbesola was appointed the Commissioner of Works and Infrastructure, which included supervision of the Public Works Corporation and the State Electricity Board(Lagos). He not only oversaw a large investment in road infrastructure in the state, but also birthed the master plan that has served as a basis for the infrastructural development and expansion observed in Lagos even after Tinubu's two terms in office.

== 2007 gubernatorial campaign ==
Following Tinubu's tenure as governor of Lagos State, Aregbesola ran on the platform of the then Action Congress (AC) for the Governorship of Osun State in the April 2007 elections.

Aregbesola had to withstand several attempts by the incumbent state government to cut short his ambition, from the failed attempt to abort the launch of Oranmiyan, the campaign organisation of Aregbesola, which was fixed for Oshogbo Stadium until the state government deployed force to stop the event.

On 16 May 2005, a major financier of Aregbesola's campaign, Alhaji Sulaimon Hassan-Olajoku, was assassinated at Gbongan Junction after attending a series of political events to mobilise support of Aregbesola. Aregbesola also narrowly escaped assassination plots in Ilesha in 2005 and on Osogbo Oroki Day in 2006.

In addition, a petition led to the arrest and detention of Aregbesola for three weeks by men of the Lagos State Police Command until a High Court ruled in favour of him and awarded a penalty of N5m against the police for wrongful arrest and detention.

=== Legal battle ===
After incumbent Olagunsoye Oyinlola was declared the winner of the 14 April 2007 elections, Aregbesola immediately proceeded to the courts to overturn this outcome.

In May 2008, Aregbesola called over 100 witnesses and tendered 168 exhibits in his petition before the Election Petitions Tribunal, alleging violence and ballot box stuffing in the election. In an October 2008 interview, he described Oyinlola as "a bully who came from a reactionary military arm", stating that Oyinlola had done nothing for the people of Osun state. He also claimed that 12 people had died in the election violence.

In August 2009 the police arrested Aregbesola, apparently for involvement in the alleged forgery of a police report on the conduct of the elections. Later that month he sought bail so that he could perform the lesser Hajj in Saudi Arabia. In August 2010 the police summoned him to make a statement about a 14 June 2007 bomb explosion near the ministry of water resources. Aregbesola denied any involvement, stating that he was in Abuja at the time. Having gone through the tribunal of first instance, an appeal and a retrial tribunal, the second appeal court, delivering judgment on 26 November 2010, declared Aregbesola governor and ordered that he be sworn in the next day. The Court was presided over by Justice Clara Bata Ogunbiyi, who was flanked by four other justices; Honourable Justices M.L. Garba, P.A. Galinge, Chima Centus Nweze, and A. Jauro. The court unanimously nullified the election results of the 10 local governments pleaded for by Aregbesola and set aside the judgement of a lower tribunal which had confirmed the election of Oyinlola, after the deductions of the cancelled votes had left Oyinlola with 172,880 votes and Aregbesola with 198,799, thereby returning Aregbesola as the duly elected governor of the state, three years after the elections.

The Governor of Edo State, Comrade Adams Oshiomhole, offered his congratulations for the belated recognition of his election victory.

Oyinlola alleged that there was telephone contact between Justice Ayo Salami, head of the Nigerian Court of Appeal, and the Action Congress of Nigeria (ACN) chieftains prior to the decision and urged the Attorney General of the Federation "to exercise his power of public prosecution entrenched in Section 174 (1) and (2) of the 1999 Constitution by initiating legal action against MTN Nigeria Limited after he petitioned the National Judicial Council. The Court rejected his application for Salami's call log.

In a reply to a memo submitted by Aregbesola to a Truth and Reconciliation committee he had set up to look into the alleged atrocities committed by the previous government, Oyinlola described Aregbesola's claims as lies.

== First term (2010–2014) ==
In his first term as governor of the state, Argebesola outlined his goals for the state: banish poverty, banish hunger, banish unemployment, restore healthy living, promote functional education and enhance communal peace and progress. Aregbesola actively pursued all action points of this plan in his first four years in office. For instance, he introduced an initiative for the creation of 20,000 jobs for youths in his first 100 days, which he achieved through the Osun Youth Empowerment Scheme (O-YES).

Other initiatives he introduced in his first term included the Osun School Infrastructure Development Project, which involved the construction of about 170 new schools, the Osun mid-regional market (O-HUB), the Osun Rural Enterprise and Agriculture Programme (O-REAP), the Osun Elementary School Feeding Programme (O-MEAL), Osun Tourism (O-TOURS), and the Osun Special Ambulance Scheme (O-AMBULANCE), along with investments in roads and bridges.

Aregbesola did these while championing the cause of equality among all religions to promote peace among communities. Aregbesola introduced Isese Day as a public holiday for traditional worshipers to celebrate like the Christians and Muslims in the state have always done, and also adopted the title of "Ogbeni" (Mister), while also branding the state's citizens as "Omoluabi".

== Second term (2014–2018) ==
In the 2014 election, the People's Democratic Party (PDP), which controlled the federal government, sought to win the 2014 Osun State gubernatorial election to secure a stronger base in the south-west for the general elections to be held in 2015. National forces were therefore deployed in a plot to intimidate voters and reduce votes, but despite several arrests of his key associates, Aregbesola defeated the PDP's candidate, Senator Iyiola Omisore.

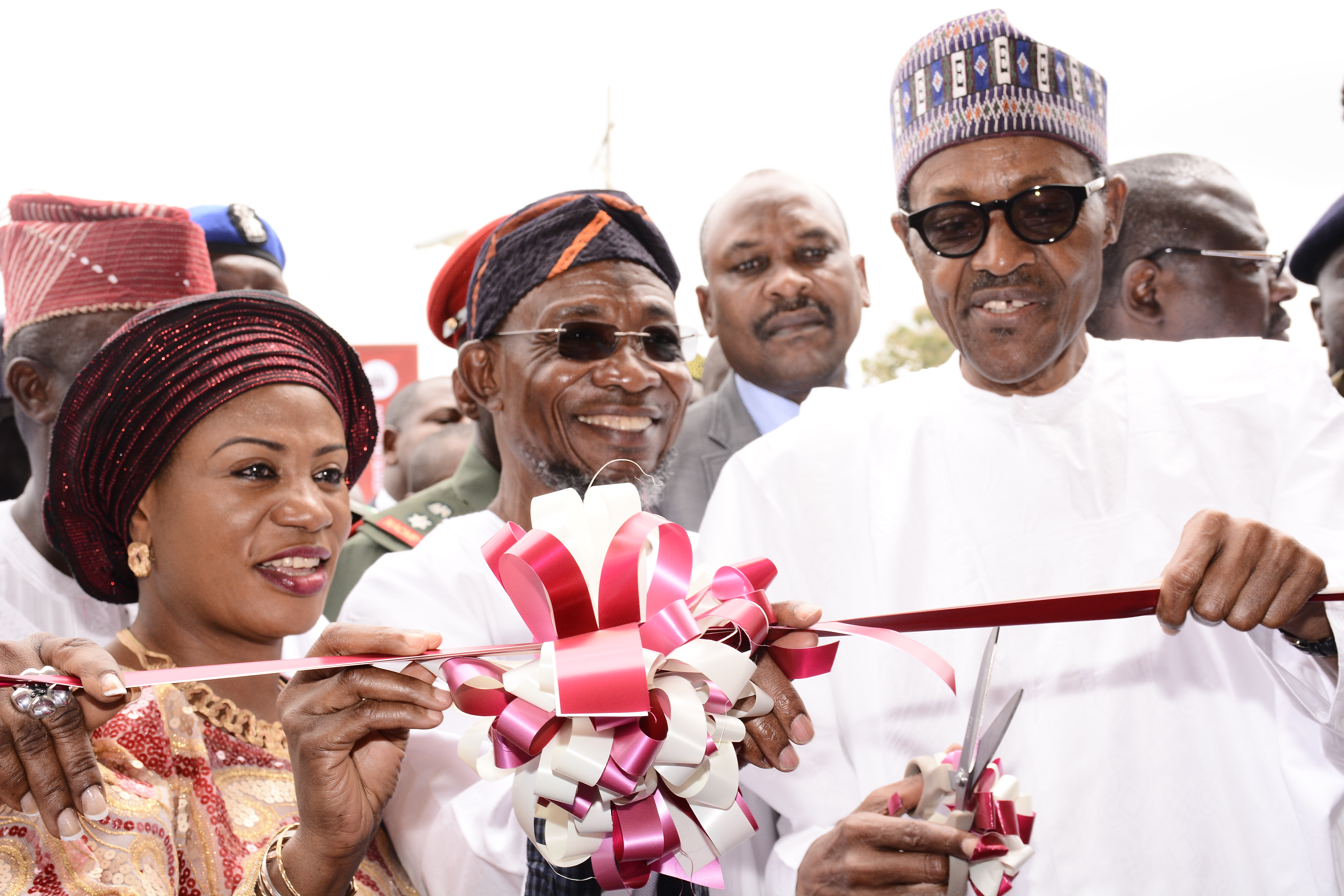
Nigeria's President Muhammadu Buhari (right), then governor of the State of Osun, Ogbeni Rauf Aregbesola (centre) and his wife, Mrs. Sherifat Aregbesola (left) during the commissioning of Osogbo Government High School, Osogbo on 1 September 2016.

Upon re-election, Aregbesola consolidated his achievements in his first term. He introduced the Opon-Imo, an electronic tablet distributed for free to students in public schools in Osun. Aregbesola also began the commissioning of school infrastructure invested in by his government. In September 2016, President Muhammudu Buhari visited the state capital to commission one of the 3000-capacity schools, which have become a model emulated by other states. The governor also unveiled a plan to site an aircraft maintenance hub in Osun and completed five bridges in a state which did not have one before he was elected governor.

The federal government and other states sent delegations to Osun to study Aregbesola's implementation of the school feeding programme.

=== Impeachment attempt ===
In June 2015, an Osun State Judge, Justice Oloyede Folahanmi, wrote a petition to the State House of Assembly requesting the impeachment of Aregbesola on claims of financial mismanagement, which had been a recurring allegation due to the large investments in several projects for the state by Aregbesola. After many delays, a panel was set up by the House to probe Aregbesola, and the Governor appeared before the panel, which later found him not guilty of the allegations raised by the judge.

In 2016, the National Judicial Council recommended Justice Oloyede for compulsory retirement after it found that the petition written by the judge "contained political statements, unsubstantiated allegations and accusations aimed at deriding, demeaning and undermining the State Government of Osun, the person and character of the Governor, his deputy and aides".

== Policies ==
=== Educational policy ===
Two months after he was sworn in, Aregbesola organized an educational summit to chart a new way forward in the educational sector in Osun. The summit, chaired by Wole Soyinka, centered around the primary and secondary levels based on the belief that basic education is of paramount importance. Stakeholders at the summit resolved to a number of reforms that the Aregbesola administration implemented. This included changing the education structure from the primary, junior secondary, and senior secondary format to the elementary, middle school, and high school format as the best way to deliver education to school children, as well as designing effective monitoring and control of the process.

The Aregbesola administration also introduced the Opon-Imo (Tablet of Knowledge) Project. The project applied technology to deliver learning content for thousands of high school students to aid their preparation for the Senior School Leaving Examinations. Opon Imo received a UN-World Summit Award for innovation as well as endorsement by UNESCO, the West Africa Examination Council and several others. Aregbesola's government also paid the external examination fees for all public senior secondary schools, in an effort to reduce the burden on parents.

The state government then built new structures to benefit student learning. Across the state, a plan was drawn up to rebuild 96 schools, while tripling the capacity of each school and increasing the facilities therein. A number of those schools have now been commissioned and, in September 2016, President Muhammadu Buhari went to the state capital to personally commission the Osogbo Government High School, while showering encomiums on Aregbesola.

The Osun Elementary School Feeding and Health Programme (O-MEALS) was launched in the state under Aregbesola to provide free daily meals in school to students, in a move to encourage school enrollment. Osun won several endorsements from the World Bank and other world bodies, with the House of Commons in the United Kingdom also inviting Aregbesola to address it on the impact of the programme on child health and education. Also, the United States Ambassador paid a visit to Osun in June 2017, where he praised Aregbesola for his implementation of social investment programmes. The O-MEALS programme feeds about 252,000 elementary school pupils daily and helped increase school attendance by 25% within 6 months of its commencement. In addition, the scheme engages 3000 women community caterers and thousands of smallholder farmers. Today, O-MEALS is being used as the template for the current National Government's Home-grown School Feeding Scheme. The state government also oversaw the standardisation of the school uniforms to create a unique identity for its students, promote its culture and stimulate the local economy. The implementation of the O-Uniform scheme led to the building of the largest garment factory in West Africa in Osogbo, Osun, where the uniforms are made and shared to students around the state.

Aregbesola continued to invest in education throughout his tenure. The investments in education have started yielding results, as private proprietors have begun to comment on the loss of students to the public schools, which are now of increased capacity.

=== Infrastructure and security in Osun ===
The Aregebsola administration rehabilitated and completed 230 states roads spanning 368 km. His administration partnered with local governments to deliver 226 council roads across the 31 local governments with a combined length of 216 km. The administration also pioneered solutions in community-based rural road maintenance through the Rural Access and Mobility Project (RAMP 2) in partnership with the World Bank and French Development Agency. The state is on course to deliver the next set of 250 km. Osun is one of just six states selected to partake in this programme. In all, the government improved more than 1000 km of roads. The state currently has about five bridges nearing completion, when none existed in 2010 when Aregbesola was sworn in as governor. There has also been a similar investment in the security of the state, particularly with the procurement of 125 patrol vans, several armoured personnel carriers and a helicopter for distribution to security forces.

=== Social security initiatives ===
The Aregbesola administration pioneered a conditional cash transfer scheme called "Agba Osun". Through this scheme, Osun was able to lift many out of poverty, becoming the state with the lowest poverty rate in Nigeria.

=== Economic development ===
Investments and production has been on the rise in Osun. In 2009, International Breweries plc, Ilesa, known for its Trophy brand, doubled its production capacity to cater for the boost in the local economy. Tuns Farms, an indigenous poultry company, in partnership with small holder farmers, ramped up broiler production to position the state as the second largest broiler producer in the country. Omoluabi Garment Factory, a PPP between Sam and Sara Garments and the State, emerged as the largest garment factory in West Africa. An indigenous computer assembly plant, RLG Adulawo, also set up shop in Osun as a result of the favourable infrastructures in the State.

In 2015, the Oxford Poverty and Human Development Initiative rated Osun second highest on its Human Development Index among the 36 states in Nigeria. In 2014, Rennaissence Capital ranked Osun as the 7th largest economy in Nigeria, while in 2017 the NBS rated Osun as the state with the lowest poverty rate in Nigeria. In Osogbo, there was a renovation of the Nigeria Railway Station terminus and urban renewal of the city center towards Olaiya junction and the building and repair of roads.

== Principles ==
Aregbesola has always received press attention for his approaches toward human capital development, education, and infrastructure, which have often landed him in the center of public discussion.

He supports Fiscal federalism for Nigeria and Regional Integration as a means of attaining sustainable economic development and national competitiveness.

Aregbesola has supported the development of human values through extracurricular programmes, such as calisthenics, the Omoluabi Boys and Girls Club, and other schemes for youths to channel their energies towards a society that promotes the common good.

=== The Omoluabi ethos ===
In Yorubaland, Olu-iwa is regarded as the custodian of good character. The concept of Omoluabi was derived from Olu-iwa. It was Omo ti Olu-iwa bi (the child of Olu-iwa), which was shortened to Omoluwabi and later Omoluabi. In Yorubaland, an Omoluabi is someone who is of impeccable character. Simply put; Omoluabi is the word in the Yoruba language that describes an individual, male or female, young or old that possesses the following qualities: hard work, honesty, integrity, fairness, egalitarianism, respect for elders and constituted authority; and fear of God among other virtues.

When Aregbesola decided to embark on a rebranding of Osun State shortly after his inauguration, he did so by naming the citizens of the state "Omoluabi", and driving a strong campaign about the values that make an Omoluabi in what was a rallying call to citizens to embrace such values. His contributions were recognized when, in 2016, the Alaafin of Oyo, Oba Lamidi Adeyemi III, a revered Yoruba traditional leader, named Aregbesola as the 'Omoluabi of Yorubaland' for being at the forefront of projecting the Omoluabi ethos.

== Political affiliations ==
Aregbesola has remained within the same political group even as it went through several mergers, first changing to the AC, then the ACN and the APC, which would later become the federal ruling party in the country.

=== Oranmiyan ===
When Aregbesola decided in 2005 to run for governor, a political support movement was instituted named Oranmiyan, after the son of Oduduwa, regarded as the founder of the Yoruba race. The Oranmiyan group was led by Prince Felix Awofisayo since its inception in 2005, and was a major force in ensuring the success of Aregbesola in 2007. The group has since evolved by entering into mergers to become a worldwide group called Oranmiyan Worldwide.

== Family and personal life ==
Aregbesola is married to Sherifat Aregbesola.

== See also ==
- List of governors of Osun State
- Cabinet of Nigeria
