= Anthony Udofia =

Nigerian navy captain

Military Administrator of Osun State
- In office 9 December 1993 – 22 August 1996
- Preceded by: Isiaka Adetunji Adeleke
- Succeeded by: Anthony Obi

Navy Captain (retired) Anthony Udofia served as Administrator of Osun State, Nigeria from December 1993 to August 1996 during the military regime of General Sani Abacha. He was reported to have harassed his predecessor, Isiaka Adetunji Adeleke, stalling his business plans and bugging his telephones.

He set up a four-man judicial panel of inquiry, convened on 18 April 1994, to investigate allegations that Adeleke had ordered materials bought for water projects to be sold off to contractors.

A severe rainstorm in September 1994 destroyed 400 school buildings across the state. Udofia said that N1 billion would be needed to rehabilitate the schools.

As a former military administrator, he was required to retire from the navy in June 1999 at the start of the Nigerian Fourth Republic.
