= Moji Akinfenwa =

Nigerian politician (1930–2019)

Senator for Osun East
- In office May 1999 – May 2003
- Succeeded by: Iyiola Omisore

Personal details
- Born: 1930; Ilesa, Southern Region, British Nigeria (now in Osun State, Nigeria)
- Died: 10 October 2019 (aged 88–89); Ibadan, Oyo State, Nigeria

Mojisoluwa O Akinfenwa // (1930 – 10 October 2019) was a Nigerian politician who was elected Senator for the Osun East constituency of Osun State, Nigeria at the start of the Fourth Nigerian Republic, running on the Alliance for Democracy (AD) platform. He took office on 29 May 1999.

Upon his arrival at the Senate in June 1999, he was appointed to committees on Selection, Senate Services, Solid Minerals, Banking & Currency and Education.

== Biography ==
In December 2003 Alhaji Ahmed Abdulkadir, outgoing national chairman of Alliance for Democracy party wrote to the Independent National Electoral Commission (INEC) naming Akinfenwa as the new national chairman.

The party had split into two rival factions, with the other led by Chief Bisi Akande.

In February 2004 the INEC summoned a meeting of AD leaders that excluded the two rival chairmen in an effort to resolve the situation.

Continued efforts to resolve the split were ineffective.

The Yoruba socio-political organisation, Afenifere, threw its weight behind Akinfenwa, a move criticized at a meeting of former AD Governors of South-West states in August 2004.

In a February 2006 interview Akinfenwa continued to insist that he was the AD chairman, not Akande.
