= Inle (Santería) =

Orisha of Health and Medicinal healing in Santería

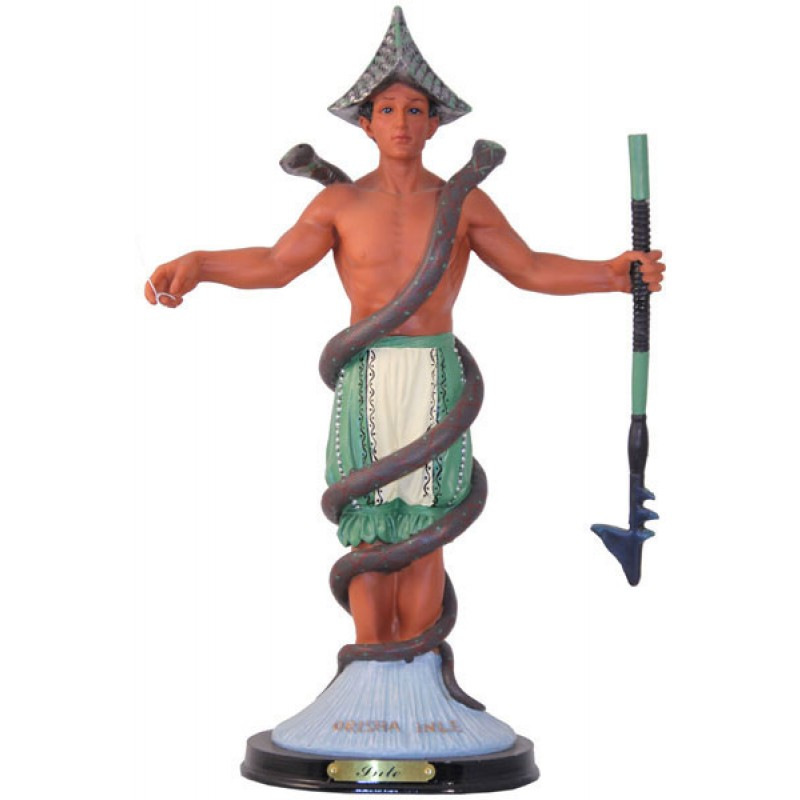
Depiction of Inle

Inle is the orisha of health and all medicinal healing in Santeria, and also in Candomblé and Palo Mayombe. Inle, also known as Erinlẹ, is an Orisha who is associated with the estuary, an in-between space where the freshwater river meets the salty sea. He is the deity of health and medicine, the physician to other deities, hunter of the land and sea, and is often regarded as the patron of homosexual and transgender people. According to Yoruba tradition, Inle was a mighty hunter who became deified. He is also syncretized with the Archangel Raphael, whose name signifies "God heals." Raphael is frequently shown with fish, wearing blue and pink, and is the patron of nurses, doctors, and other medical workers.

Inle is commonly depicted as a strong, healthy-looking warrior and hunter, with flowing hair in seven braids and fine, feminine features that give him an androgynous appearance. He is always dressed elegantly, adorned in cowrie shells, coral, and beautiful feathers from the birds he hunts, and is often shown with snakes wound around him, recalling the association of snakes with healing as seen in the caduceus and staff of Aesculapius. Inle may also represented holding a staff, dagger, or a fishing hook . In nature, he is represented by fish. His colors are white, yellow, and blue, though some sources say indigo, turquoise, and coral. His sacrificial victims are typically pure white as well.

In one Cuban Santería "pataki", or mythological story, the sea goddess Yemaya (Yemoja) is tricked into incestuous sex with her son Shango. To hide her shame at this event, she banished her other two sons, Inle and Abbata, to live at the bottom of the ocean, additionally cutting out Inle's tongue and making Abbata deaf. As a result of their isolation and loneliness, Inle and Abbata become passionate friends and then lovers, able to communicate emphatically. This pataki is used to explain the origin of incest, muteness, and deafness in addition to homosexuality.

== See also ==
- LGBT themes in African diasporic mythologies
