= Omoluwabi =

Concept of Yoruba Philosophy

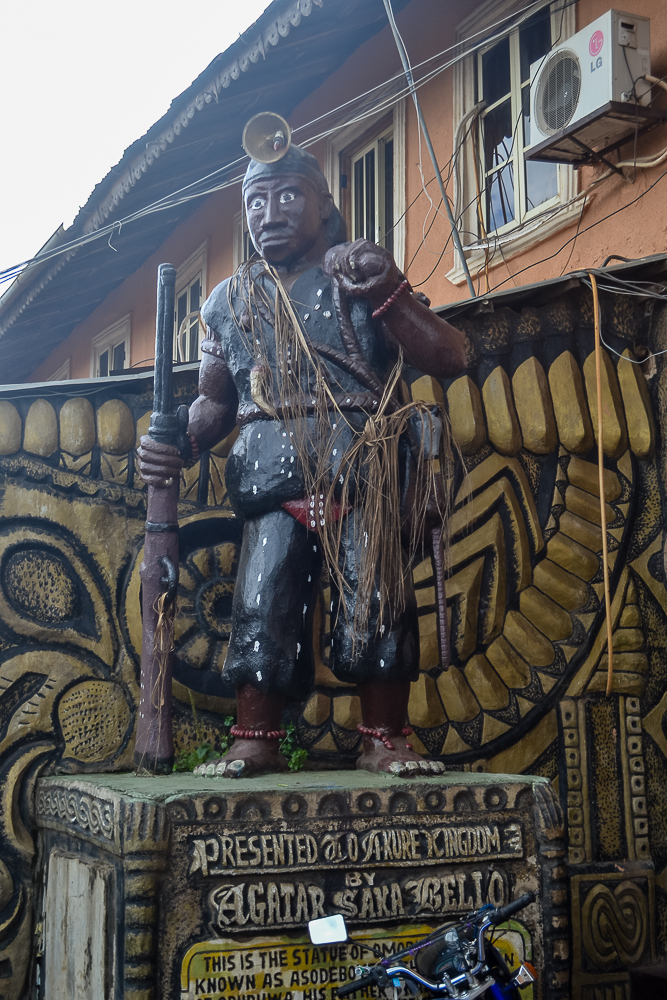
Statue of Omoremi Omoluabi

The Omoluwabi is a cultural concept way of life that's native to the Yoruba people. It's used to describe a person of good character. The omoluabi concept signifies courage, hard work, humility and respect. An omoluabi is a person of honor who believes in hard work, respects the rights of others, and gives to the community in deeds and in action. Above all, an omoluwabi is a person of integrity.

The Omoluwabi concept is an adjectival Yoruba phrase, which has the words - "Omo + ti + Olu-iwa + bi" as its components. Literally translated and taken separately, omo means 'child', ti means 'that or which', Olu-iwa meaning the chief or master of Iwa (character), bi means 'born'. When combined, Omoluabi translates as "the child begotten by the chief of iwa. Such a child is thought of as a paragon of excellence in character.

An omoluwabi demonstrates and exhibits the inherent virtue and value of Iwapele. Iwapele is ultimately the basis of moral conduct in Yoruba culture and a core defining attribute of an omoluwabi. The most fundamental of these principles demonstrated by an omoluabi are:

- Oro Siso (Spoken word, the Yoruba accord great respect for intelligent and expert use of language)
- Iteriba (Respect)
- Inu Rere (Good will, Having a good mind towards others)
- Otito (Truth)
- Iwa (Character)
- Igboya (Bravery) personified by an "Akinkanju"
- Ise (Hardwork)
- Opolo Pipe (Intelligence)

An individual can be termed an omoluabi irrespective of the religion the person adheres to. Consequently, some of the characteristics and traits of an omoluabi are considered virtues in many religions, for example, humility, truth and honesty. Omoluwabi is a variant of Omoluabi broken down into Omo-l-ua-bi. As defined previously, Omo is child. The letter "l" is a link similar to "ti" meaning that or which. The word "ua" means community meeting place, normally at the palace when the Oba presides. The word "bi" means "born". Put together, Omo-l-ua-bi means a child born (nurtured / raised / trained) by the community. The only change being highlighted here is "ua" as a Yoruba word.

== See also ==
- Emi Omo Eso
