= Mechanical engineering technology =

Mechanical engineering technology is the application of engineering principles and technological developments for the creation of useful products and production machinery.

== Technologists ==
Mechanical engineering technologists are expected to apply current technologies and principles from machine and product design, production and material and manufacturing processes.

Expandable specialties may include aerospace, automotive, energy, nuclear, petroleum, manufacturing, product development, and industrial design.

Mechanical engineering technologists can have many different titles, including in the United States:

- Mechanical Engineering Technologist
- Mechanical Engineer
- Product Engineering Technologist
- Mechanical Designer
- Product Development Engineering Technologist
- Manufacturing Engineering Technologist

=== Training ===
Mechanical Engineering Technology coursework is less theoretical, and more application based than a mechanical engineering degree. This is evident through the additional laboratory coursework required for a degree. The ability to apply concepts from the chemical engineering and electrical engineering fields is important.

Some university Mechanical Engineering Technology degree programs require mathematics through differential equations and statistics. Most courses involve algebra and calculus.

Oftentimes, a MET graduate could get hired as an engineer; job titles may include Mechanical Engineer and Manufacturing Engineer. In the U.S. it is possible to get an associate or bachelor's degree. Individuals with a bachelor's degree in engineering technology may continue on to complete the E.I.T. (Engineer in Training) examination to eventually become Professional Engineers if the program is ABET accredited.

== Applications ==
Software tools such as Finite Element Analysis (FEA) and Computational Fluid Dynamics (CFD) are often used to analyze parts and assemblies. 3D models can be made to represent parts and assemblies with computer-aided design (CAD) software.

Through the application of computer-aided manufacturing (CAM), models may also be used directly by software to create "instructions" for the manufacture of objects represented by the models, through computer numerically controlled (CNC) machining or other automated processes.

== See also ==
- Mechanical engineering topics
