= Olagunsoye Oyinlola =

Nigerian politician and general (born 1951)

Omoba Brigadier General Ọlágúnsóyè Oyinlọlá
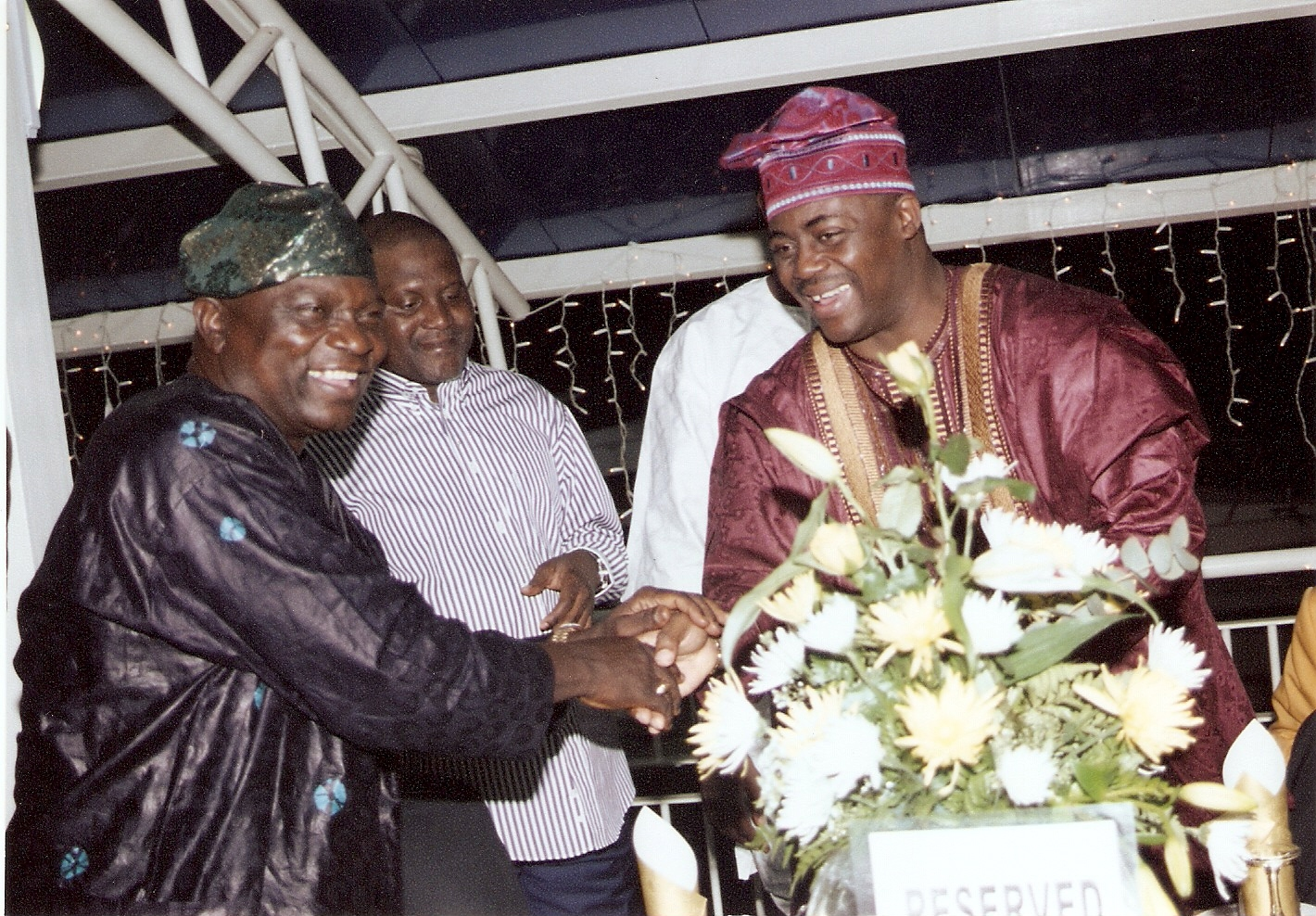
- Olagunsoye Oyinlola (left) with Femi Fani-Kayode at a reception in 2007

Governor of Osun State
- In office 29 May 2003 – 26 November 2010
- Deputy: Olusola Obada
- Preceded by: Adebisi Akande
- Succeeded by: Rauf Aregbesola

Military Governor of Lagos State
- In office December 1993 – August 1996
- Preceded by: Michael Otedola
- Succeeded by: Mohammed Buba Marwa

Personal details
- Born: 3 February 1951 (age 75) Okuku, Southern Region, British Nigeria (now in Osun State, Nigeria)
- Party: African Democratic Congress

Military service
- Allegiance: Nigeria
- Branch/service: Nigerian Army
- Rank: Brigadier General

Ọlagunsoye Oyinlọla (born 3 February 1951) is a retired Nigerian military general, who became governor of Osun State, Nigeria in May 2003, and was reelected in 2007. He was a member of the ruling Peoples Democratic Party (PDP).

On 26 November 2010 a court of appeals nullified his election. He later defected to the APC shortly before the 2014 Osun State governorship election. He was former military administrator of Lagos State.

== Background and education ==
Omoba Ọlagunsoye Oyinlọla was born on 3 February 1951 into a royal family in Okuku, in the Odo Ọtin Local Government Area of Ọṣun State. His father, Moses Oyewole Oyinlola, was the traditional ruler (Ọba) of Okuku, reigning from 1934 to 1960.

After leaving secondary school at the age of 18, Ọlagunsoye Oyinlọla enlisted in the army in 1969.

While in the army, Oyinlọla obtained leave to attend the University of Ife (now Obafemi Awolowo University), where he obtained a Diploma in International Relations in 1979. He also obtained a Master of Science in Defense Studies in 1988 from the University of Madras, India. In 1999, Oyinlọla obtained a master's degree in Strategic Studies from the University of Ibadan. In 2003, he obtained a law degree from Buckingham University, United Kingdom.

In April 2004, the Ladoke Akintola University of Technology, Ogbomoso made him an honorary Doctor of Civil Law. In April 2006, the Federal University of Technology, Minna, made him an honorary Doctor of Science. He has also been conferred with an honorary Doctor of Laws (Osun State University, 2009), LL.D (Honoris Causa) University of Buckingham - 2005; and honorary Doctor of Civil Laws (Lead City University Ibadan - 2010).

== Military career ==
Ọlagunsoye Oyinlọla enlisted in the Nigerian Army as a Signals corps private in 1969. He attended the Nigerian Defence Academy, Kaduna and was commissioned as an officer in 1971, into the Armoured Corps of the Nigerian Army.

He later trained at the Armed Forces Command and Staff College, Jaji, the National War College, Abuja and various military institutions and academies in India, United Kingdom and the United States.

He served as Troop Leader, Squadron Leader, Battalion Commander, Brigade Commander, Acting General Officer Commanding and Military Administrator. He participated in the United Nations Peace-Keeping exercises in Chad in 1983 and Somalia in 1993.

During the administration of General Ibrahim Babangida (1985–1993), he was either a staff officer or a commander of an armoured unit.

He was appointed the military administrator of Lagos State from December 1993 till August 1996, during the subsequent administration of General Sani Abacha.

In June 1996, Kudirat Abiola, wife of the acclaimed winner of the 1993 presidential election Chief MKO Abiola, was assassinated on the road between his office and that of the Canadian High Commission. In September 2009, a spokesman for the United Action for Democracy (UAD) accused Oyinlola of being the 'chief conspirator' in the alleged murder.

He retired with the rank of Brigadier-General in 1999.

== Governorship ==
In April 2003, Ọlagunsoye Oyinlọla was elected governor of Osun State as a member of the ruling People's Democratic Party (PDP). He was reelected in April 2007.

He appointed Fatai Akinade Akinbade as State Secretary in 2003. Akinbade was later to be a contender to succeed Oyinlola as governor.

In an interview in November 2003, Ọlagunsoye Oyinlọla spoke in favor of increased education in Yoruba, even up to the university level. When asked about the Afenifere movement, he stated that he would join if it were purely an association of Yorubas, but not if it was just another name for the Alliance for Democracy (AD) party.

After the 2007 election, the Action Congress governorship candidate, Rauf Aregbesola filed a petition with the Independent National Electoral Commission (INEC) against his victory. The tribunal rejected his petition. Aregbesola appealed the decision, leading to a fresh hearing in June 2009.

In April 2009, Next magazine reported that Olagunsoye Oyinlola had been caught on tape telling local PDP politicians he would supply army uniforms, arms and ammunition so they could rig the runoff elections in Ekiti State.

In July 2009, Olagunsoye Oyinlola banned Igbo people in Osun state from parading themselves as Eze Ndigbo (king of Igbo), in order to protect the Igbo culture and traditional institution from ridicule. At the same time, he sought constitutional responsibilities for traditional rulers in the country.

In September 2009, Oyinlola opened a ceremony at which Modakeke traditional ruler, Oba Francis Adedoyin, was crowned.

On 26 November 2010 the Court of Appeal in Ibadan presided over by Justice Clara Ogunbiyi ruled that Oyinlola had not won the 2007 election and that the Action Congress candidate Rauf Aregbesola should be sworn in as governor. He is a former chairman of the board of the National Identity Management Commission (NIMC) having been appointed in 2017.

On 31 January 2018, he was part of the launch of "Coalition for Nigeria" movement a political movement to check the failings of APC.

== Appointment as NIMC's Chairman Board of Directors ==
On Thursday 21 September 2017, he was inaugurated as Chairman of the Governing board of the National Identity Management Commission, (NIMC).

His appointment was by President Mohammadu Buhari.

The Acting Secretary to the Government of the Federation, Mrs Habiba Lawal, inaugurated the 9-man board on behalf of the Federal Government in Abuja

Represented on the board are the Military, Nigeria Immigration Service, Federal Road Safety Corps, Economic and Financial Crimes Commission, other government agencies and the private sector.

On Thursday, 10 May 2018, he resigned from his position as Chairman of NIMC, citing "a greater political engagement that will make that difficult and even impolitic".
