= Peter Adeleke =

Peter Adeleke (also known as The Trailblazer) is a Nigerian-Canadian leadership coach, author, speaker, and comedian. He is notable for holding the Guinness World Record for the longest leadership lesson.

== Career ==
Adeleke first gained public recognition in Nigeria under the name Trailblazer as a comedian and online skit maker. His comedy content focused on everyday social experiences, personal conduct, and motivational themes.

From the late 2010s onward, Adeleke gradually shifted his professional focus from entertainment to leadership development and public speaking targeted at youths and entrepreneurs.

== Guinness World Record ==
In 2024, Adeleke announced his intention to attempt the Guinness World Record for the longest leadership lesson. Later that year, he successfully set the record in Canada by delivering a continuous leadership lesson lasting more than 28 hours. The session focused on leadership principles, personal development, and professional growth. The achievement was officially verified and published by Guinness World Records, establishing Adeleke as the record holder for the longest leadership lesson.
