= Olusola Obada =

Nigerian politician and lawyer (born 1951)

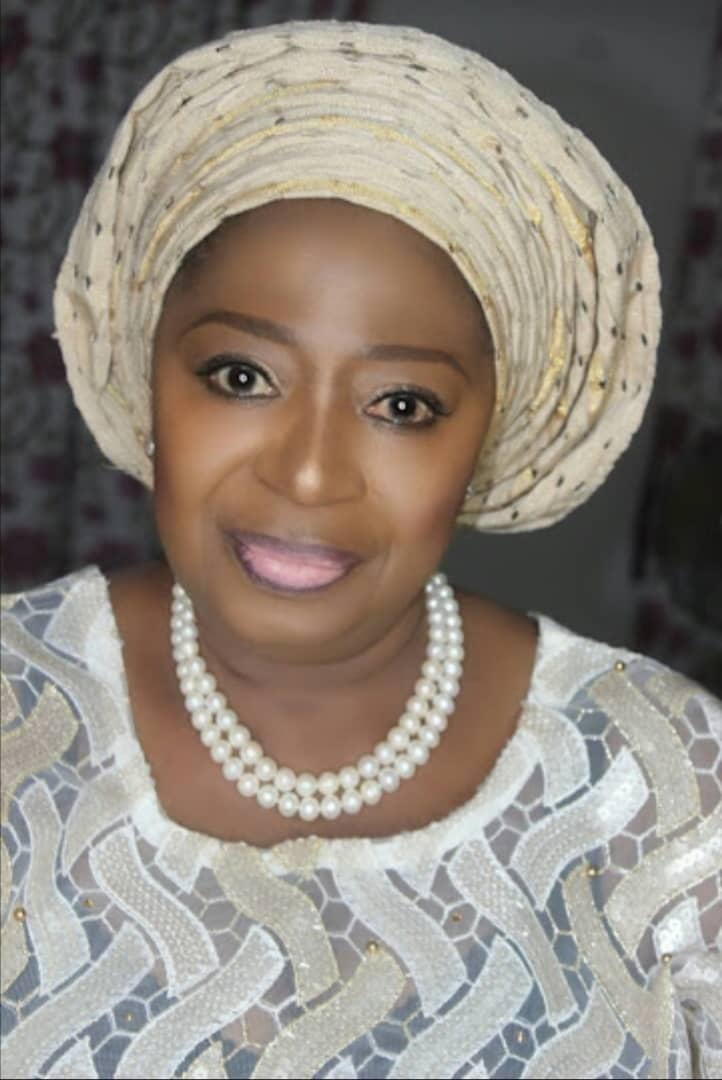

Minister of Defence
- In office July 2012 – September 2013
- President: Goodluck Jonathan
- Preceded by: Haliru Mohammed Bello
- Succeeded by: Aliyu Mohammed Gusau

Deputy Governor of Osun State
- In office 29 May 2003 – 26 November 2010
- Governor: Olagunsoye Oyinlola
- Preceded by: Iyiola Omisore
- Succeeded by: Titilayo Laoye-Tomori

Personal details
- Born: Olusola Idowu Agbeja; 27 June 1951 (age 75) Ilesa, Southern Region, British Nigeria (now in Osun State, Nigeria)
- Party: Peoples Democratic Party
- Spouse: Babatunde Obada
- Education: Queen's School, Ibadan; Watford College of Technology; University of Buckingham
- Occupation: Lawyer; politician

Olusola Obada (born 27 June 1951) is a Nigerian politician and lawyer. She served as deputy governor of Osun State from 2003 to 2010, as Nigeria's Minister of State for Defence from 2011 to 2012 and then as Nigeria's Minister of Defence from 2012 to 2013 under the Cabinet of President Goodluck Jonathan.

== Early life and education ==
Olusola Idowu Agbeja was born into the Agbejanlabofa family of Ibodi in Ijeshaland on 27 June 1951, she completed her basic education at UMC Demonstration School, Ibadan and her secondary school education at Queen's School, Ede, Osun State. She is an alumnus of Watford College of Technology, Watford, United Kingdom where she studied Advertising Administration before proceeding to the University of Buckingham, Buckingham, United Kingdom to study Law and subsequently called to the Nigerian Bar in 1986.

== Career ==
=== Private sector ===
Obada began her career as Advertising Officer with Nigeria Airways before leaving the company to work as Managing Partner in Olusola Agbeja and Co. in 1986. In 1990, she established Iron Gate Finance and Trust Company Limited, a privately owned finance and investment company where she served as Managing Director. In 1996, she was employed as the Executive Director, Finance and Administration of Materials Management Services Limited and later rose to become the company's Managing Director.

=== Politics ===
In 2003, Obada was elected as Deputy Governor of Osun State with Olagunsoye Oyinlola as governor until on 27 November 2010 when she vacated the post. In January 2011, Obada was appointed into Directorate position, covering the South-West of Nigeria for the Goodluck and Sambo Presidential Campaign Organisation. In July 2011, following Jonathan's victory in the Presidential elections, Obada was appointed Minister of State for Defence by Goodluck Jonathan, and then served in Jonathan's cabinet as de facto Defence Minister until a major reshuffle in September 2013. On 6 March 2014, she was appointed by Goodluck Jonathan as one of the top five Nigerian elder-statesmen in the 2014 National Conference, Nigeria. On 29 September 2014, Goodluck Jonathan honoured her with the Commander of the Order of the Niger (CON) national award. On 2 January 2015, she was appointed by Goodluck Jonathan into a Directorate position for his 2015 presidential re-election campaign. On 6 May 2015, she was appointed Chairman of the Federal University, Dutsin-Ma Governing Council, one of the last appointments made by out-going President Goodluck Jonathan.

== Personal life ==
Obada is married to Babatunde Obada with whom they have four children. She is a traditional chieftain who holds about five traditional titles including those of the Erelu of Ijeshaland, Eyaloje of Arigidi of Akoko, and the Yeye Asiwaju of Ibodi.

== Bibliography ==
- Erelu Olusola Obada: her brain, her glamour, her politics : an Amazon in the news. Royal Trust Communications. 2006.
