= Ilobu =

Headquarters of Irepodun Local Government Area in Osun State, Nigeria

- LGA and town
- Location within Nigeria
- Coordinates: 7°49′N 4°28′E
- Country: Nigeria
- State: Osun State
- Elevation: 331 m (1,086 ft)

Population
  - Total: 118,097
- Time zone: UTC+1 (WAT)
- 3-digit postal code prefix: 230103
- Area code: LBU
- ISO 3166 code: NG.OS.IP.IL

Ilobu is a town and the administrative headquarters of Irepodun Local Government Area of Osun State, Nigeria. It is located in a sparsely forested area and is bounded on the north by Ifon-Osun, on the south by Okinni, on the east by Oba and on the west by Erin-Osun. It is watered by Ojutu River, Erinle River, Konda River and a few other streams.It has a population of about 30,825 (2006 census).

== People and culture ==
The Ilobu people's tradition and culture have to do with the way they live, govern themselves, their religion, language, dressing pattern, arts, festivals and the rules they set for themselves. They have a very strong sense of community and this has enhanced mutual understanding and meaningful development in the town.

== Arts and crafts ==
Ilobu is a big arts and crafts centre in Nigeria. These include metal crafts, blacksmithing, weaving, painting and sculpturing and leather work. The dyeing of clothes known as "adire" is well known in Ilobu. Adire is a special art of tying and dyeing of clothes to bring out unique designs. It is very popular all over the world.

== Traditional religion beliefs ==
Erinle is an annual festival of worship within the town where ram with pounded yam and Sekete wine - a traditional wine - are used to worship but the tradition is not as it used to be. Everybody in the town, worship Erinle with Olobu the king. On the fifth day, Erinle images would be brought out. A twenty-eight day notice would be given, around August before the actual festival in September. Erinle had been worshipped before the arrival of Islam and Christianity. The ram would not be killed but would be thrown into the river alive. Akodo is the priest and there are many spots in the river called Ibu which represented where Erinle’s sons live.

The significance of the festival is linked to the continued peace, harmony and progress of the town. Despite the fact that majority of its populace are either Muslims or Christians, Erinle festival remains a rallying point for the natives of Ilobu in Osun State.

== System of administration ==
Politically, the Olobu enjoys extensive power. He has legislative and judicial powers. In the past, he monopolised the right to impose or commute capital punishment and also controlled appointments to senior political offices. Though the Olobu has the right to choose his own chiefs, he is, himself, chosen by the kingmakers. In the palace, the Olobu has some palace officials called 'Oba ni nki o'. This is hierarchically set up with 'Baba kekere' as its leader. The 'Baba kekere' is chosen by the reigning Olobu or his chiefs. The palace officials also include the Palace Chronicler in person of the Chief Drummer.

The Olobu rules the town through a chain of the most senior chiefs. The chiefs are known as 'llu' or 'Town Representatives'. The 'llu' is headed by Bara, who is regarded as next in rank to the Olobu. The other senior chiefs are Jagun, Balogun, Otun and Baalẹ Gbobamu (Gbobamu Chief). Women also play active roles in the traditional and political administration of llobu and are given a voice through their political representative, Iyalode, who is assisted by her Otun Iyalode and Seriki, second and third in rank respectively.

Next to the llu, come the Baale (heads of households). The Baale(s) represent their different households. They do not hold meetings together except when called together by the Olobu and his chiefs. The oldest man in the compound is usually elected as the Balaeẹ It is required that all members of a household should be able to trace their descent from a common ancestor. The unit is strictly exogamous, and sexual relations between members are regarded as incestuous and are punishable by the gods of the community.

== Past and present Olobus ==
- Láarọ́sìn
- Láaró
- Ńlánru
- Ayọnu
- Ayédùn
- Lálùwóyè
- Mọláoyè
- Olúsílọo
- Olúyíde
- Ẹníyítàn
- Ọmọlará
- Ayẹnii
- Àjàyí died in 1933
- Ọláníyan 1933—1935
- Oyèélàdée 1935—1939
- Sànúsí Àraoyè 1943—1971
- Àmínùu Siyanọ́láa 1971—1972
- Ásírù Ọlátóyè Ọláníyan 1974– present

== Sport developments ==
Ilobu appreciates the importance of sport. Most young and able bodies in the community are fans of sports, with football being the most popular. The town has two major football clubs - Ilobu Vipers Football Club (past winners of the state league) and Ilobu United Football Club who are strong contenders in the state league.

== Market days ==
Ilobu is blessed with two markets, Olobu and Adio markets. Olobu market is held at five day intervals while the latter is held at three day intervals. There is also a daily night market in the town.

Olobu Market is a periodic market in Ilobu, a town in Irepodun Local Government Area, Osun State, Nigeria. It is on the Ilobu–Ifon road, and trading days fall at fixed multi-day intervals. [citation needed]

Ilobu is a trade centre for yams, maize, cassava, oil palms, pumpkins, beans and okra grown in the surrounding area. It is also a collecting point for locally produced cash crops, including cotton, tobacco and cocoa. [].

Livestock, including dwarf cattle, goats, sheep, chickens, ducks, and guinea fowl, are also an important part of the town's economy. Weaving and dyeing are the prominent traditional crafts.

Ilobu is connected by road to Ogbomosho and Oshogbo. Population (1995) 194,400. The market attracts a lot of people from within and outside Ilobu most especially from around the neighbouring cities, towns and villages.

One of the remarkable things about Olobu market is its size. It is normally held from morning to evening.

Situated along Ilobu-Ire-akari-Erin Osun road, Adio market is an everyday market in Ilobu where food stuff and other goods are sold. The market attracts a lot of people from within and outside Ilobu and it is normally held from morning to evening.

== Future development ==
With the establishment of Irepodun Local Government in 1976, there is a new sense of hope among the civilians that the government will come to the aid of the town, it is hoped that the rate of development of llobu will increase with the implementation of the new government.

== Town planning ==
The planning of llobu has assumed a new dimension since the establishment by law of the town planning authority. The Osun State Town Planning Authority has exerted considerable influence on the town.

== Places of interest ==
Places of interest in Ilobu are the Olobu Palace Complex, the Erinle shrine and Ilobu museum situated within the palace complex.

== Public utilities ==
There are tarred roads from llobu to Osogbo, about 9.5 kilometres away, and Ogbomosho 48 kilometres, and the other from llobu to Ede, 24 kilometres. The town is linked by many roads, which are tarred and motorable. It has modern buildings, electricity, pipe-borne water, post office, telephone service, radio and television.
