= Iyiola Omisore =

Nigerian politician (born 1957)

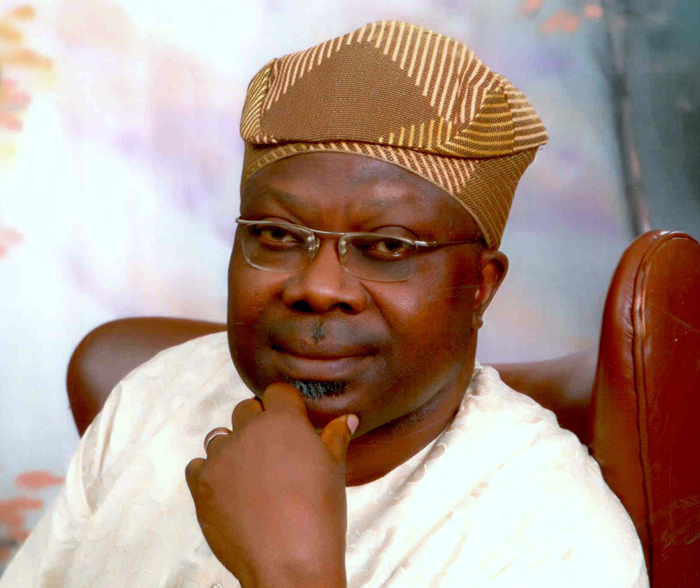

National Secretary of the All Progressives Congress
- In office March 2022 – 17 July 2023
- Chairman: Abdullahi Adamu
- Succeeded by: Ajibola Basiru

Senator for Osun East
- In office 3 June 2003 – 6 June 2011
- Preceded by: Moji Akinfenwa
- Succeeded by: Babajide Omoworare

Deputy Governor of Osun State
- In office 29 May 1999 – 29 May 2003
- Governor: Adebisi Akande
- Succeeded by: Olusola Obada

Personal details
- Born: Iyiola Ajani Omisore; 15 September 1957 (age 68) Ile-Ife, Western Region, British Nigeria (now in Osun State, Nigeria)
- Party: All Progressives Congress
- Education: SS Peter and Paul Roman Catholic School; St. John Grammar School
- Alma mater: Technology College, Reading UK; Brunel University London; International School of Management, Paris
- Occupation: Politician; engineer; businessman

Iyiola Ajani Omisore (born 15 September 1957) is a Nigerian businessman, engineer, and politician who served as deputy governor of Osun State from 1999 to 2003. Subsequently, he served as a member of the Nigerian Senate for Osun East from 2003 to 2011. He is a former national secretary of the All Progressives Congress.

== Background ==
Iyiola Omisore was born 15 September 1957, into a royal family in Ile-Ife, where he was also raised. He is the son of Oba David Olajide Omisore and the grandson of Lowa Ajani Anibijuwon Omisore, both of Olode, Ayepe.

Iyiola is also the grandson of the Late Olufewara Kabiyesi Oba Titus Adetoba of the Oseganderuku ruling house in Ifewara where his mother, Princess Emila Adejola ruled as Regent until her death in 2006.

In August 2006, his father was crowned as the first Olu of Olode Town in Ife South Local Government Area of Osun State.

== Education ==
He had his primary education at the SS Peter and Paul Roman Catholic School in Ile-Ife and his secondary education at St. John Grammar School Ile-Ife, Osun State, Nigeria from 1972 to 1977.

He then attended Federal Polytechnic Owo in Ondo State Nigeria. He then sat for and passed his Full Technological Certificate Examinations at the Technology College, Reading UK, and obtained a diploma Certificate in Electrical/Electronics Engineering.

Omisore holds two engineering degrees and a postgraduate certificate from Brunel University Uxbridge, as well as a PhD in Infrastructure Finance from the International School of Management, Paris, France. He is currently undergoing his DBA programme at the same institution. A Fellow of the Institution of Mechanical Engineers, England and Wales, he has undergone several courses in different high-profile institutions including Georgetown University, Washington DC, USA; ABS Academy, Athens, Greece; University of Carolina; West London College; Harvard University and the Internationale Weiterbildung und Entwicklungg GmbH, Germany.

In January 2013, he completed and was awarded a Doctorate Degree by the International School of Management in Paris.

== Business ==
He started his early professional life 1983 with Drake and Gordham while in the UK, rising to top management positions. Two years later, he was brought back to Nigeria by its Nigerian division, Drake and Scull (Nig) Ltd where he honed his project management skills. He later established his own engineering firms; Mechelec Consultants –an Engineering Consultancy outfit and Chrisore Eng Ltd – an Electrical Engineering firm.

While with Drake and Scull Nig. Ltd, he supervised the construction of 19 airfields including the Makurdi Air Force Base and other projects like the Sokoto and Makurdi Rice Mills, Taraku Oil Mill, Sokoto University Teaching Hospital, Onitsha Flour Mills, Bank of The North (now Unity Bank) Building, World Bank Assisted Health Projects for Plateau, Benue and Nasarawa States and the Imiringi Rural Electrification project in Bayelsa State.

== Political career ==
=== Deputy Governorship ===
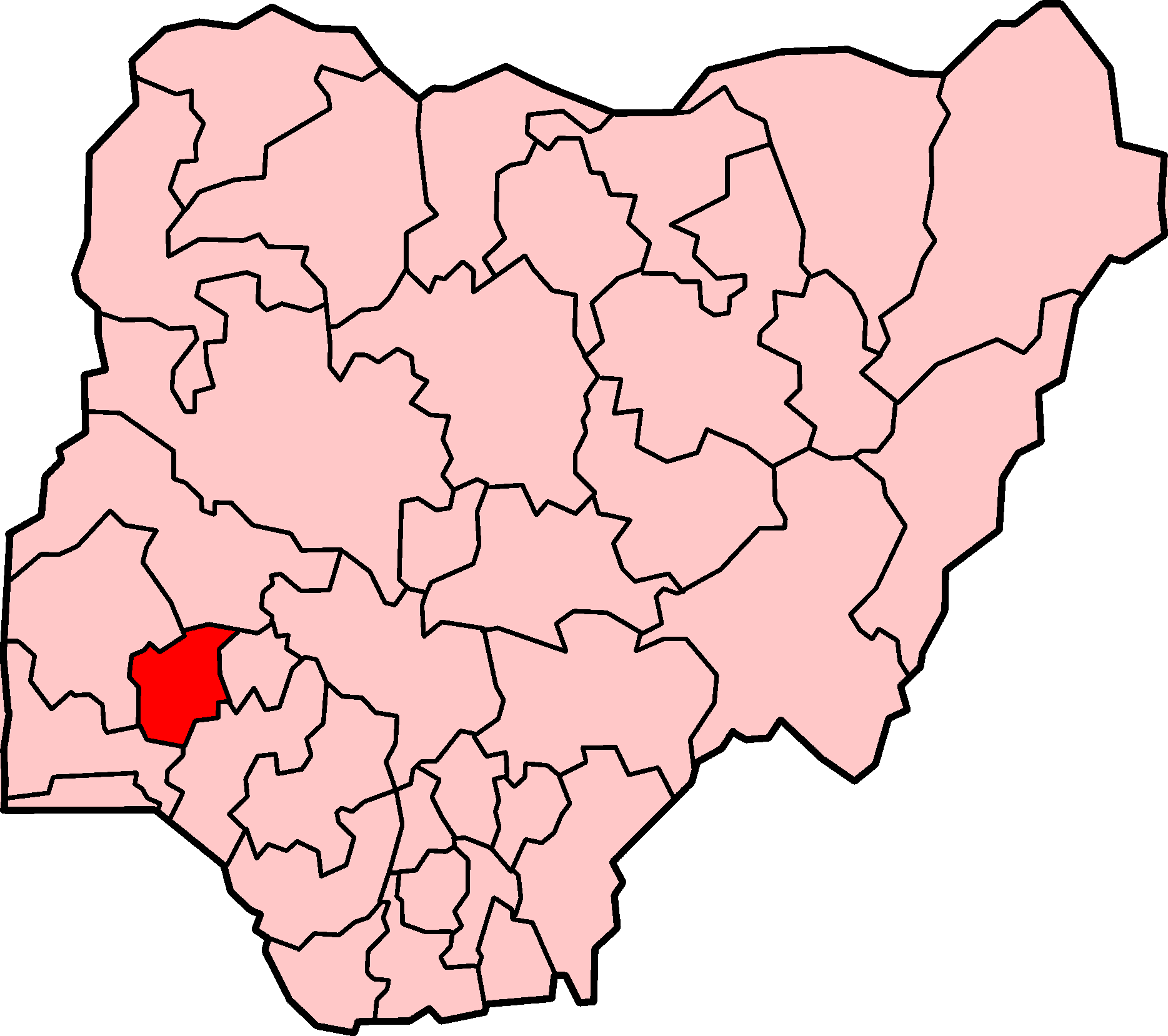
Osun State, Nigeria

Omisore served as deputy governor of Osun State from 1999 to 2003 under Governor Adebisi Akande.

=== Senate ===
Even though he was still on trial, he was elected to the Senate to represent Osun East constituency in April 2003 running on the platform of the PDP and served till the expiration of his term in 2007.

He was reelected in 2007 and appointed to committees for Police Affairs, Housing, Culture & Tourism, Aviation and Appropriation. In May 2008, he was named a member of the National Assembly Joint Committee on Constitution Review (JCCR).

In October 2008, Omisore was one of the Nigerian delegates to the 5th Consultative Assembly of Parliamentarians in Santo Domingo, Dominican Republic.

== Governorship Race ==
He ran for Governor of Osun State on the platform of the Peoples Democratic Party (PDP), in the 9 August 2014 guber election and lost to Rauf Aregbesola who was the incumbent governor. He contested for the governorship seat on the platform of the Social Democratic Party (SDP) in the 2018 Osun State gubernatorial election where he came third behind Senator Ademola Adeleke of the Peoples Democratic Party (PDP) and the eventual winner, Alhaji Gboyega Oyetola of the All Progressives Congress (APC).

== Awards and achievements ==
He was conferred with the Nigerian Society of Engineers (NSE) Presidential Merit Award for Support and Contribution to the Development of the Society in 2007. Also, he was honoured with the Prime Award for Remarkable Contribution to the Growth of Engineering Profession and Society when the NSE was celebrating its Golden Jubilee in 2008.
