= Irepodun, Osun State =

Irepodun
- LGA
- Interactive map of Irepodun
- Location in Nigeria
- Coordinates: 7°50′N 4°29′E
- Country: Nigeria
- State: Osun State

Government
  - Local Government Chairwoman and the Head of the Local Government Council: Adegoke R. Ogunsola

Area
  - Total: 64 km^{2} (25 sq mi)

Population (2006 census)
  - Total: 119,497
  - Density: 1,900/km^{2} (4,800/sq mi)
- Time zone: UTC+1 (WAT)
- 3-digit postal code prefix: 230
- ISO 3166 code: NG.OS.IP

Irepodun is a Local Government Area in Osun State, Nigeria. Its headquarters are in the town of Ilobu. The current chairman of the council is Adegoke R. Ogunsola.

It has an area of 64 km^{2} and a population of 119,497 at the 2006 census.

The postal code of the area is 230.

== Irepodun South Local Council Development Area (LCDA) ==
Irepodun South Local Council Development Area (LCDA) was created out of Irepodun for administrative convenience, better development planning and to bring government closer to the grassroot. The LCDA is created by the Government of Osun State and is responsible for the funding of the council. The LCDA is headed by a chairman, vice chairman and other executive and legislative branches similar to the federally recognized local councils. The current chairman of the LCDA is Oloyede Adekunle Kamoli.
