= Isiaka Adeleke =

Nigerian politician (1955–2017)

2nd Governor of Osun State
- In office January 1992 – November 1993
- Deputy: Clement Adesuyi Haastrup
- Preceded by: Leo Segun Ajiborisha
- Succeeded by: Anthony Udofia

Senator for Osun West
- In office 9 June 2015 – 23 April 2017
- Preceded by: Mudasiru Oyetunde Hussein
- Succeeded by: Ademola Adeleke
- In office 5 June 2007 – 6 June 2011
- Preceded by: Akinlabi Olasunkanmi
- Succeeded by: Mudasiru Oyetunde Hussein

Personal details
- Born: Isiaka Adetunji Adeleke; 15 January 1955 Enugu, Eastern Region, British Nigeria (now in Enugu State, Nigeria)
- Died: 23 April 2017 (aged 62) Osogbo, Osun State, Nigeria
- Party: All Progressives Congress
- Profession: Politician; businessman

Isiaka Adetunji Adeleke (15 January 1955 – 23 April 2017) was a Nigerian politician, he was a two time senator who represented Osun West from 2007 to 2011 under the Peoples Democratic Party (PDP) and was elected again under the banner of the All Progressives Congress in 2015. He ran for re-election in April 2011 on the PDP platform, coming second with 77,090 votes behind the eventual winner Mudasiru Oyetunde Hussein of the Action Congress of Nigeria (ACN) who polled 121,971 votes.

== Background ==
Isiaka Adetunji Adeleke was born on 15 January 1955 to the family of senator Ayoola Adeleke and Esther Adeleke. He was born in Enugu State and spent his early years in the city until the beginning of the Nigerian Civil War. He started his primary education at Christ Church School, Enugu, before moving to Ibadan. He completed his secondary education at Ogbomoso Grammar School. Adeleke holds a Bachelor Of Arts degree, and a master's degree in public administration. He was chairman, Governing Council, Nigerian Export Promotion Council, Pro-chancellor and Chairman, Governing Council, University of Calabar, Nigeria. He was the uncle to Nigerian musician, Davido.

== Political career ==
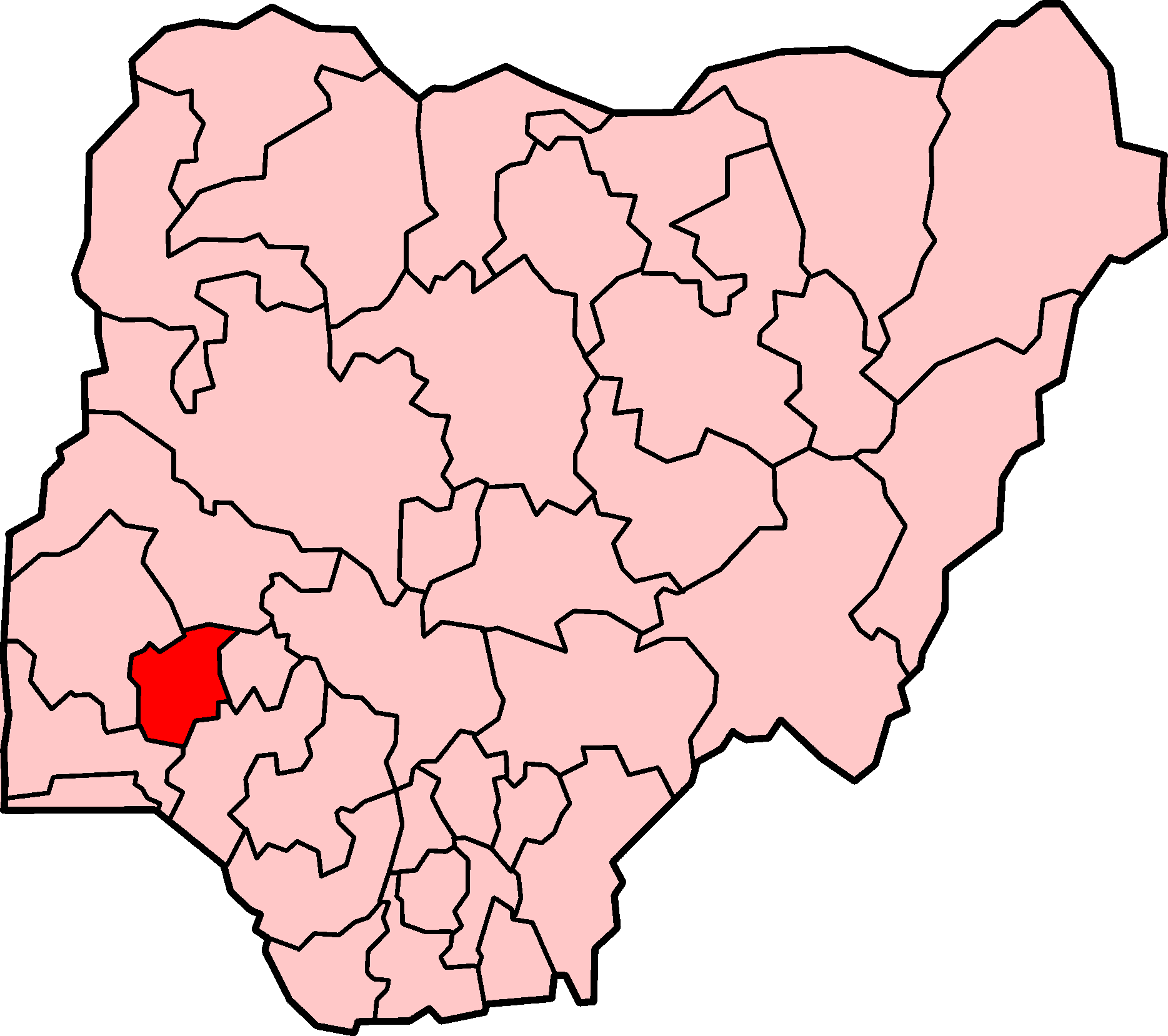
Osun State, Nigeria

During the Nigerian third republic, Adeleke ran for governor of the newly created Osun State which was carved out from Oyo State. He was a member of SDP the dominant party in the state. The front runner was a lawyer, Ladosu Ladapo, but after a close primary in which Adeleke came second, Adeleke was able to win a runoff. He was then elected the first civilian governor of Osun State in 1992. Notable decisions made by Adeleke was the establishment of a polytechnic at Iree, a college of technology at Esa-Oke and the completion of the Osun State Broadcasting Corporation. However, in 1994, after the dissolution of the republic, Adeleke pitched its tent to the opposition group, Afenifere but later switched to join a Democratic Party of Nigeria, a new political party with support from close associates of Abacha. In 2007, Adeleke was elected senator for Osun West. His main competitor was Mudasiru Oyetunde Hussein, standing for the Action Congress. Hussein had spent two terms in the House of Representatives (1999–2007) as a member of the Alliance for Democracy party in a Lagos State constituency, but originated from Osun state. Hussein appealed the election unsuccessfully. Isiaka Adetunji Adeleke was appointed to committees on Upstream Petroleum Resources, Integration and Cooperation, Housing and Air Force.

In March 2008, he instituted a scholarship award for about 100 indigent students in tertiary institutions across the country.

In July 2009, as chairman of the Senate Committee on INEC, Senator Isiaka Adetunji Adeleke praised the work of the Independent National Electoral Commission, saying "so far INEC has performed creditably well". He has supported the rights of Nigerians living abroad to vote in Nigerian elections. Adeleke, before his death was allegedly eyeing the governorship seat in Osun ahead of the 2018 election in the state.

== Death ==
Adeleke suffered a heart attack. He died on 23 April 2017 at Biket Hospital in Osogbo, the Osun State capital. It was a sad experience for the residents of Osun State, his family and well-wishers.
