= Action Congress of Nigeria =

Political party

- Chairman: Adebisi Akande
- Secretary-General: Lawali Shuaibu
- Founded: 2006
- Dissolved: 2013
- Merger of: Faction of Alliance for Democracy; Justice Party; Advance Congress of Democrats
- Merged into: All Progressives Congress
- Headquarters: 16 Bissau Street, Wuse, Zone 6, Abuja
- Ideology: Conservative liberalism Pan-Africanism
- Political position: Centre-right
- Colours: Green, black, white

Party flag

Website
- actioncongressnigeria.org

The Action Congress of Nigeria (ACN), formerly known as Action Congress (AC), was a Nigerian political party formed via the merger from the coming together of a faction of Alliance for Democracy, the Justice Party, the Advance Congress of Democrats, and several other minor political parties in September 2006. The party controlled Lagos. It was regarded as a natural successor to the progressive politics more closely associated with the Action Group and Unity Party of Nigeria (UPN) led by Chief Obafemi Awolowo in the First and Second Republics respectively. However, criticism of the party's more pragmatic and less ideological political outlook associated with AG and UPN, has made many argue it was less of a worthy political heir. The Party had strong presence in the South West (five Governors, 15 Senators and six State Houses), Mid-West (one Governor) and North Central Regions (3 Senators). Lagos, Edo, Ekiti, Kogi, Ondo, Bauchi, Plateau, Niger, Adamawa, Oyo and Osun states by far accounts for majority of the party's presence and discernible power base.

In February 2013, the party merged with the Congress for Progressive Change, the All Nigeria Peoples Party, and the All Progressives Grand Alliance to form the All Progressives Congress.

== 2006 ==
The party was formed in 2006 in order to form a larger political opposition to the federally dominant centrist People's Democratic Party and the Northern-based All Nigeria Peoples Party. On May 12, 2006, the provisional officers of the party (most of whom carried their seats from the Alliance for Democracy) were replaced at the Kaduna convention by ballot; Bisi Akande succeeded Hassan M. Zurmi as National Chairman, and Bashir Dalhatu replaced Bumi Omoseyindemi as National Secretary.

== 2007 ==
The party ran Vice President Atiku Abubakar, who defected from the People's Democratic Party, as its presidential candidate in the 2007 presidential election. Abubakar was disqualified from the election by the Independent National Electoral Commission (INEC), but the disqualification was later overturned by the Supreme Court. Currently, the party's most prominent elected official was former member, Governor Babatunde Fashola of Lagos State. Also very prominent in the party was the political brain behind the party, Asiwaju Ahmed Tinubu, the former Governor of Lagos State and erstwhile Senator in the Third Republica.

In the 21 April 2007 Nigerian National Assembly election, the party won 32 out of 360 seats in the House of Representatives and 6 out of 109 seats in the Senate.

Following the victory of PDP candidate Umaru Yar'Adua in the 2007 presidential election, the AC has been pursuing a legal challenge to the results. On July 6, 2007, the party announced its rejection of an offer to join Yar'Adua's government (an offer that was accepted by the ANPP and the Progressive Peoples Alliance), with a spokesman saying that "there is no compelling moral, legal or political reason for us to join a government that we have told the whole world stole its mandate" and that participating in the government would mean "partaking in stolen goods".

However, on August 7, 2007, the National Secretary, Bashir Dalhatu, resigned (along with two other officials) over the refusal of the Action Congress to take up Yar'adua's offer. He was replaced by the current Secretary, Usman Bugaje.

== 2008–2009 ==
Most of the Party's success came in 2008 via judicial challenges to the widely maligned 2003 General Elections, that was judged to be rigged by international observers and even the ruling party in favor of the PDP. In 2008, the Party's candidate in Edo State, former Labor leader Comrade Adams Oshiomhole won a decisive victory and took the mantle of power in that state. In Ekiti state, the Party's candidate- Dr. Fayemi, also emerged victorious over the PDP Candidate Engr. Oni in court, and secured a cancellation of results of 63 wards, with the Appeals Court ordering rerun. Heading into this rerun, AC had an over 12,000 votes advantage. The Acting Speaker of the Ekiti State House of Assembly (legislature) was an AC member.

AC Governorship candidates had cases pending in Osun, Oyo and Ogun states where analysts have given them better than even chance to secure a rerun or emerge outright victors. The Ekiti State governorship rerun election also saw some form of alliance between the Labour Party governor in Ondo State, Dr. Mimiko, and the Action Congress under the perceived leadership of Asiwaju Bola Tinubu.

== 2010 ==
The Action Congress changed their name to the Action Congress of Nigeria. The March 2010 rerun of the Ekiti governorship polls resulted in PDP Candidate and Ex-Governor, Engineer Oni being returned as winner despite widespread allegations of voter intimidation, rigging and pressures on INEC officials to release the falsified result to favor the ruling party (PDP). AC Candidate proceeded to challenge these results at the Elections Tribunal, where he lost 3–2. Pinning his appeal on the minority judgement, he sought to be installed as Governor based on the cancellation of results from two local governments where PDP allegedly perpetrated fraud and violence. A ruling from the Appeal Court (the final adjudicator of governor elections disputes) on September 14, 2010, eventually returned Dr. Fayemi of Action Congress as the 3rd Executive Governor of Ekiti State after three and a half years of protracted court battles and occupancy by the usurper PDP government in the state.

On November 26, 2010, the AC Candidate in Osun State, Engr. Aregbesola was declared the duly elected governor of Osun State by the Court of Appeals sitting in Ibadan. This brings the number of AC seats recovered via the judicial process to four out of five states virtually controlled. Only one of those seats, was up for contest in the 2011 cycle i.e. Lagos State. In December 2010, the Action Congress of Nigeria conducted its National Convention in Benin City which returned Chief Bisi Akande as the National Chairman and Senator Lawal Shuaibu replacing Dr Usman Bugaje as the National Secretary.

== 2011 ==
The Action Congress of Nigeria has two major presidential aspirants contesting for the party ticket: The former chairman of the Economic and Financial Crimes Commission (EFCC) Nuhu Ribadu, and former governor of Sokoto State, Attahiru Bafarawa.

== 2013 ==
In July 2013, the party officially merged with the Congress for Progressive Change (CPC), the All Nigeria Peoples Party (ANPP) and a governor from the All Progressive Grand Alliance (APGA), amongst others, to form the All Progressives Congress.

== See also ==
- Congress for Progressive Change
- All Nigeria Peoples Party
- All Progressives Congress
