= Sumner Dagogo-Jack =

Sumner Karibi Dagogo-Jack

Chairman of the National Electoral Commission of Nigeria
- In office 1994–1998
- Preceded by: Okon Uya
- Succeeded by: Ephraim Akpata

Personal details
- Born: 1930 (age 95–96) Abonnema, Akuku-Toru LGA, Rivers State, Nigeria

Chief Sumner Karibi Dagogo-Jack (born 1930) was chairman of the National Electoral Commission of Nigeria (NECON) appointed by President Sani Abacha, holding office from 1994 to 1998.

Dagogo-Jack served as a member of the Humphrey Nwosu electoral commission (1989–1993) and was later appointed chairman of the National Electoral Commission of Nigeria. His commission was reportedly not impartial, but was controlled by Abacha. Under Dagogo-Jack, NECON registered five political associations, none led by credible politicians. These were United Nigeria Congress Party (UNCP), Congress for National Consensus (CNC), Democratic Party of Nigeria (DPN), National Centre Party of Nigeria (NCPN) and Grassroots Democratic Movement (GDM). The purpose was to ensure that Abacha would become the sole presidential candidate, supported by all parties.

The commission conducted elections for the local government councils and the National Assembly. NECON overstepped the bounds of its authority in some cases. For example, shortly before the March 1997 local government elections, Dagogo-Jack nullified the positions of National Leader in the NCPN and National Coordinator in the DPN, which he said were in violation of the parties' constitutions. The elected officers had not been inaugurated when Abacha died suddenly in June 1998, and his successor Abdulsalami Abubakar initiated a fresh electoral process that would lead to the establishment of the Nigerian Fourth Republic in May 1999.

Dagogo-Jack hails from Abonnema, in Akuku-Toru Local Government Area of Rivers State. His brother Samuel Dagogo-Jack is a medical practitioner based in the US, while his much younger brother, Beks Dagogo-Jack serves as the Chairman of the Presidential Task Force on Power under the Nigerian Presidency.
