= 1998 Nigerian parliamentary election =

Parliamentary elections were held in Nigeria on 25 April 1998. They were the first since 1992, following a coup in 1993. All parties running in the election were affiliated with the military regime, with all opposition parties banned. Voter turnout was very low, and the election results was annulled by the government. Fresh elections were held the following year.

== Results ==
=== Senate ===
Party	Seats
United Nigeria Congress Party	61
Democratic Party of Nigeria	9
Congress for National Consensus	6
Grassroots Democratic Movement	2
National Centre Party of Nigeria	2
Total	80
Source: African Elections Database

=== House of Representatives ===
Party	Seats
United Nigeria Congress Party	229
Democratic Party of Nigeria	39
Congress for National Consensus	6
Grassroots Democratic Movement	4
National Centre Party of Nigeria	4
Total	282
Source: African Elections Database
