= Miss Polo International 2019 =

2nd Miss Polo International competition, beauty pageant edition

- Date: September 14, 2019
- Presenters: Joe Mohan
- Venue: Jumeirah Zabeel Saray, Dubai, United Arab Emirates
- Director: Ibife Alufohai
- Entrants: 30
- Placements: 10
- Debuts: Argentina; Armenia; Colombia; Ecuador; England; Germany; Haiti; Indonesia; Liberia; Lithuania; Mexico; Netherlands; Philippines; Scotland; Senegal; Thailand; Turkey; Ukraine; Wales; Zambia; Zimbabwe
- Withdrawals: Algeria; Austria; Brazil; Czech Republic; Denmark; Finland; Japan; Spain
- Winner: Dewanti Kumala; Indonesia

Miss Polo International 2019 was the 2nd edition of Miss Polo International pageant, held on 14 September 2019 at Jumeirah Zabeel Saray, Dubai, United Arab Emirates.

Contestants from 30 countries participated in this year's Miss Polo International pageant, surpassing the previous record of 17 contestants in the inaugural 2018 event.

== Results ==
=== Placements ===
Final result	Contestant
Miss Polo International 2019	Indonesia - Dewanti Kumala
1st runner-up	Philippines – Joanne Ayrra Averilla
2nd runner-up	Turkey – Sandra Zemaityte
Top 5	Thailand – Atitiya Benjapak; Nigeria – Precious Okoye
Top 10	Cameroon – Sylvia Anyam Nkenku; Ecuador – Viviana Quiñonez; England – Chloe Nicole; Mexico – Graciela Natali Castro; Netherlands – Laura Herman

=== Continental queens ===
Award	Name	Country
Miss Polo Europe	Laura Herman	Netherlands
Miss Polo Africa	Precious Okoye	Nigeria
Miss Polo Americas	Graciela Natali Castro	Mexico
Miss Polo Asia	Atitiya Benjapak	Thailand

== Special awards ==
Award	Name	Country
Best in Talent	Graciela Natali Castro	Mexico
Best in National Costume	Atitiya Benjapak	Thailand
Best in Evening Gown	Sandra Marcela Diaz	Colombia
Missosology Choice Award	Graciela Natali Castro	Mexico
Miss Polo Top Model	Chloe Nicole	England
Miss Photogenic	Lorena Lopez	Argentina
Miss Project Video	Dewanti Kumala	Indonesia
Miss Amity Award	Joanne Ayrra Averilla	Philippines
People's Choice Award	Lucy Lyasheva	Russia

== Contestants ==
30 contestants competed for the title of Miss Polo International 2019.

- Argentina – Lorena Lopez
- Armenia – Krystyna Vysotska
- Burkina Faso – Emmanuella Kone
- Cameroon – Sylvia Anya Nkenku
- Colombia – Sandra Marcela Diaz
- Ecuador – Viviana Quinonez
- England – Chloe Nicole
- Germany – Marina Eva Rolgeyzer
- Ghana – Eunice Frempng-Manso
- Haiti – Jean Dorothy
- India – Arnitha Damparala
- Indonesia - Dewanti Kumala
- Kenya – Diana Akoth Aluko
- Liberia – Natasha Antionette Benson
- Lithuania – Karina Jankelevic
- Mexico – Graciela Natali Castro
- Netherlands – Laura Herman
- Philippines – Joanne Ayrra Averilla
- Nigeria – Precious Okoye
- Russia – Lucy Lyasheva
- Scotland – Chloe Bella
- Senegal – Diallo Mamadou Ramata
- Tanzania – Nazimizye Adam Mdolo
- Thailand – Atitiya Benjapak
- Turkey – Sandra Zemaityte
- Ukraine – Olya Popova
- Venezuela – Yosdany Navarropai
- Wales – Alissa Christie
- Zambia – Tina Shinga
- Zimbabwe – Letwin Tatenda Tiwaringe
