= Adagogo =

Masculine name of Ijaw origin

Adagago, Dagogo
- Gender: Male
- Language: Ijaw

Origin
- Origin: Nigeria
- Meaning: The grandfather's resemblance; the father's resemblance
- Region of origin: Niger Delta

Adagogo and Dagogo are masculine names of Ijaw origin that mean "the grandfather's resemblance" and "the father's resemblance" respectively. Like many Nigerian names, they were transformed into patronymics during the colonial period.

== Notable bearers ==
- Diminas Dagogo, Nigerian film director
- Farah Dagogo (born 1982), Nigerian politician
- Jonathan Adagogo Green (1873–1905), Nigerian photographer and one of the first African professional photographers
- Reynolds Dagogo-Jack (born 1957), Nigerian civil engineer, technocrat, entrepreneur, and public servant
- Samuel Dagogo-Jack, Nigerian-American physician
- Sumner Dagogo-Jack (born 1930), former chairman of the National Electoral Commission of Nigeria
