= Reynolds Dagogo-Jack =

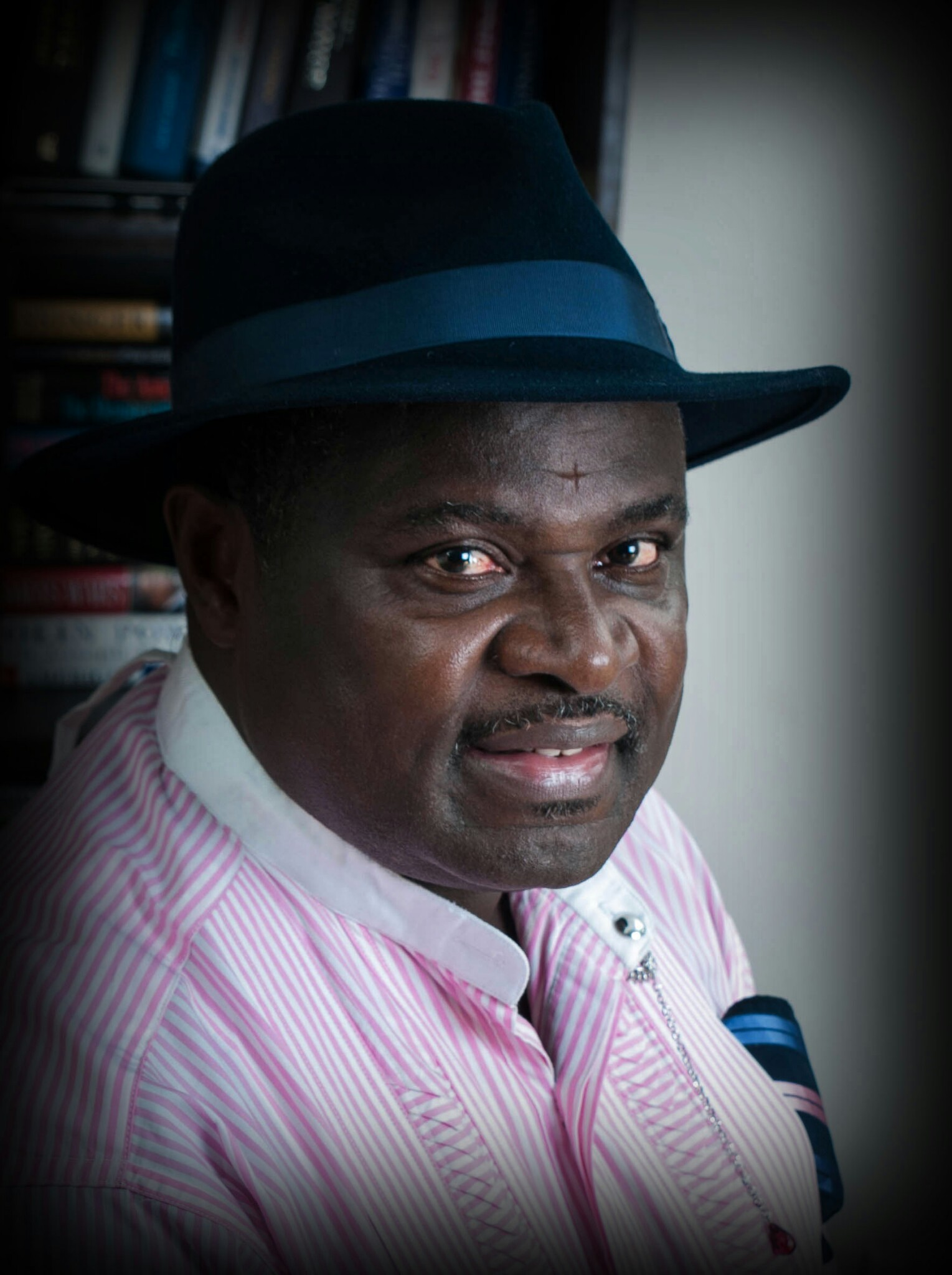

Chairman, Presidential Task Force on Power
- Incumbent
- Assumed office 5 September 2012
- President: Goodluck Jonathan
- Preceded by: Prof. Bart O. Nnaji

Co-Chairman, Inter-Ministerial Emergency Committee on Gas-to-Power
- Incumbent
- Assumed office 17 May 2014
- President: Goodluck Jonathan

Personal details
- Born: Reynolds Bekinbo Dagogo-Jack; 4 December 1957 (age 68) Abonnema, Akuku-Toru LGA, Rivers State, Nigeria
- Spouse: Hon. Justice Harriba Dagogo-Jack
- Children: 4
- Parent(s): Chief Karibi Jim Dagogo-Jack, Iju VIII of Abonnema (father); Mrs. B. K. Dagogo-Jack (mother)
- Education: University of Benin; Massachusetts Institute of Technology

Reynolds Bekinbo Dagogo-Jack (born 4 December 1957), popularly known as "Beks", is a Nigerian civil engineer, technocrat, entrepreneur, and public servant. For over thirty years, he has been active in both the public and private sector, especially in areas of government/public administration and project management including engineering, construction and manufacturing.

On 5 September 2012, President Goodluck Jonathan reconstituted the twin Presidential agencies instituted as special purpose vehicles to fast-track the implementation of the national electric power reform program: the Presidential Action Committee on Power (PACP) and the Presidential Task Force on Power (PTFP), appointing Dagogo-Jack to serve as Chairman of the PTFP and also a member of the PACP. Dagogo-Jack had been with the PTFP from its inception in June 2010, serving as a Senior Special Assistant to the President and also Senior Performance Monitor for the National Integrated Power Projects (NIPP). In this capacity, he led the special team that supervised governmental and private agencies managing over four hundred power infrastructure projects covering gas, generation, transmission and distribution projects.

On 29 September 2014, President Jonathan conferred on him the prestigious Officer of the Order of the Federal Republic (OFR).

== Education and personal life ==
Dagogo-Jack is from Abonnema, a riverine community in Akuku-Toru Local Government Area of Rivers State. He was born into the illustrious Dagogo-Jack chieftaincy family. His parents are Chief Karibi Jim Dagogo-Jack, Iju VIII of Abonnema, and Mrs. B. K. Dagogo-Jack. His elder brother, Chief Sumner Karibi Dagogo-Jack, was once the Nigerian Independent National Electoral Commission (INEC) Chairman, while his immediate older brother, Dr. Samuel Dagogo-Jack, a renowned US-based internist, was named 2013 Internal Medicine Physician of the Year by the United States National Medical Association.

Dagogo-Jack was educated in Nigeria at the University of Benin, graduating with distinctions in hydraulics and advanced structures with a bachelor's degree in Civil Engineering in 1980. In 1992, he completed coursework for a master's degree in Business Administration from the University of Lagos, Nigeria. He obtained his First School Leaving Certificate in 1969 from Bishop Crowther Memorial School, Abonnema, and his West African School Certificate in 1974 from Baptist High School, Port Harcourt, both in Rivers State, Nigeria.

Dagogo-Jack is a chartered Civil Engineer and registered to practice engineering by COREN (Council for the Regulation of Engineering in Nigeria). He is also a Fellow of the Nigerian Society of Engineers (NSE). He attended a host of advanced management and professional courses in both the Massachusetts Institute of Technology in Boston and George Washington University, Washington D.C.

He is married to Honorable Justice Harriba Dagogo-Jack of the Rivers State Judiciary. They have four kids and two grandchildren. His hobbies include golf, squash and books on political history and development.

== Non-Profit Work ==
From 1999 to 2007, Dagogo-Jack was founding Chairman of the Center for Public Good, a grassroots non-governmental organisation; and in 2001, he was Convener and Chairman of the Group of Rivers Professionals (GRIPS). He has also awarded several scholarships to deserving students from the Akuku-Toru Local Government Area of Rivers State.

== Career ==
=== Downstream Oil and Gas ===
Between 1982 and 1989, Dagogo-Jack worked in the downstream petroleum industry, starting from Unipetrol (now Oando Plc) and ending with Elf Petroleum. Serving variously as District, Divisional, Operations Engineer and Manager, his work scope covered the full gamut of downstream petroleum business such as retail outlet development and maintenance, product supply and logistics, production of lubricants and general district sales management.

=== Public Service ===
==== Aviation ====
Dagogo-Jack served as the Special Assistant (Technical) to the Honourable Minister of Aviation (Alabo T. O. Graham-Douglas), from 1989 to 1992, and was directly involved in the development of the Nigerian airline license and liberalisation policy, the reform of the national aviation management agencies and the comprehensive rehabilitation of the then three Nigerian international airports (Lagos, Kano and Port-Harcourt), and served as a Director on the Board of the Nigeria Airports Authority (now Federal Airports Authority of Nigeria – FAAN).

==== Privatisation and Reform of Public Enterprises ====
From 1992 to 1994, Dagogo-Jack served as deputy director and later as the Special Assistant to the Chairman of the Technical Committee on Privatisation & Commercialisation (TCPC, now Bureau of Public Enterprises) the Late Dr. H. R. Zayyad, fully involved in the preparation of reform packages for the National Electric Power Authority (later Power Holding Company of Nigeria), Nigerian Telecommunications Limited, Nigerian Ports Authority and Federal Mortgage Bank. During this period, he also served as Secretary to the Nigerian Airways Privatization Sub-Committee (The 'Air Nigeria' Project).

==== Management of Assets and Liabilities of Newly Created States ====
In 1996, Dagogo-Jack was appointed a Member of the Federal Government Special Committee for sharing the Assets and Liabilities of two pairs of newly created States: Sokoto/Zamfara and Bauchi/Gombe.

==== Public Infrastructure Planning and Development ====
Dagogo-Jack served as Honourable Commissioner for Works and Transport in Rivers State under the military administration of Colonel Musa Shehu, from 1997 to 1998, and was mandated to complete several infrastructural projects mostly to upgrade the facilities in Port Harcourt to enable it cope with the accelerating increase in the urban population.

In 2007, Dagogo-Jack was again appointed to serve as the Honourable Commissioner for Transport in Rivers State, and was saddled with the responsibility of transforming the state-run transport company (Rivers Transport Corporation) from its moribund condition into a viable self-sustaining enterprise, and developing a comprehensive transport policy reform agenda for the PortHarcourt metropolis which in part provided a two-year roadmap for transiting the urban mass transport system from the "Okada" culture to more a more integrated urban mass transportation system.

== Power Sector Reform ==
=== 2010–2012 ===
As Senior Special Assistant to the President monitoring the National Integrated Power Projects (NIPP), Dagogo-Jack established an aggressive project monitoring, facilitation and reporting system which led to the commissioning of the first turbine unit at Olorunsogo power plant and other equally critical transmission projects after years of frequent project slippage.

=== 2012–2014 ===
Dagogo-Jack was part of the team whose initiative resulted in the raising of a $500m transmission capacity expansion facility from the Chinese EXIM Bank. Under his supervision (and with close collaborative efforts of the sector agencies), Nigeria recorded the highest ever power supply so far delivered through the national grid of 4517MW in December 2012.

He was a chief facilitating agent in the delivery of all the factors which culminated in the successful handing over of all the sold Federal Government Generation and Distribution companies to the new private sector owners on 1 November 2013 and took the power sector reform to an irreversible threshold.

On 27 May 2014, President Goodluck Jonathan, GCFR, appointed Dagogo-Jack as co-chairman of the Inter-Ministerial Emergency Committee on Gas-to-Power, "charged with the responsibility to fast track the gas to fire plants revolution."

== Further information ==
- Dagogo-Jack Backs President Jonathan on 5,000MW Power Generation Claim (Business News, 5 January 2013)
- Power generation drops by 1,074 MW (Punch Newspaper, 10 April 2013)
- President Jonathan and Electricity (PM News, 18 February 2013)
- Beks Dagogo-Jack – Increased Demand Overwhelm Rising Power Generation (This Day Newspaper, 10 March 2013)
- Dagogo-Jack: Nigeria's Electricity Challenges More of Internal Capacity Alignment (This Day Newspaper, 28 May 2013)
- We are Making Progress on Power Sector Reform, Says Dagogo-Jack (This Day Newspaper, 7 July 2013)
- FG hands over PHCN to New Investors, Pays N360 billion Workers' Wages (Nigerian Monitor Newspaper, 2 November 2013)
- Dagogo-Jack: Power Reform Will Reduce Corruption (This Day Newspaper, 3 November 2013)
- Jonathan @ 56: Ode to True Transformational Leadership (Daily Sun, 24 November 2013)
- After Unbundling PHCN, What Next? (Daily Sun, 25 November 2013)
- Bulk Electricity Trader Yet to Commence Active Trading (This Day Newspaper, 27 November 2013)
- FG Wades into Problems of New Power Investors (This Day Newspaper, 1 December 2013)
- FG to Conclude Sale of Kaduna Disco, Afam Genco by March 2014 (This Day Newspaper, 3 December 2013)
- Presidency Denies Fraud Allegation over N1.8 billion Power Project (National Mirror, 5 January 2014)
- TCN Expands Transmission Capacity to 7,000MW (Vanguard Newspaper, 5 February 2014)
- Power Sector: Drop in Gas Supply Still a Clog (This Day Newspaper, 9 February 2014)
