= Teni Aofiyebi =

Nigerian actress and businesswoman

- Citizenship: Nigerian
- Education: University of London
- Occupations: Actress, businesswoman
- Children: 2
- Relatives: Funlola Aofiyebi-Raimi

Tenidade Aofiyebi is a Nigerian actress and businesswoman known for her roles in various Nigerian films and television shows. Over the years, she has become a prominent figure in the Nigerian entertainment industry.

== Biography ==
Aofiyebi is of Yoruba heritage. She attended St Anne's School Ibadan for her secondary school education, before taking "A" levels at Farringtons School, an independent girls school in Kent, United Kingdom. She received higher institution education at a constituent college of the University of London. She is the aunt of actress Funlola Aofiyebi-Raimi. Aofiyebi has twins Taiwo and Kehinde. She is a grandmother.

== Career ==
She starred in the soap opera Mirror in the Sun opposite Clarion Chukwura between 1984 and 1986. Aofiyebi starred in the TV series For Better, For Worse in 2003. In 2005, she starred in the political thriller Prince of the Savannah, directed by Bayo Awala. In 2013, Aofiyebi starred in the romantic comedy Flower Girl, directed by Michelle Bello. Aofiyebi had a role in the 2015 soap opera Royal Castle, with themes involving betrayal, deception, corruption, and love.

Aofiyebi launched the rental business TKM Essentials in May 2014. The primary clients include event planners and interior decorators. The idea for the business came when she was planning her 60th birthday and received a large bill from the event planner and decided it would be more economical to buy the supplies rather than rent them. Most of her supplies are sourced from China and India, and she said they appear expensive but would be affordable to those with money. The store is located in Raufu Williams Crescent, in Lagos, and the grand opening was attended by First Lady of Lagos Abimbola Fashola. In July 2014, Aofiyebi served as a business mentor to young entrepreneurs as part of the Mara Mentor initiative. In 2019, she was a judge in a beauty pageant for deaf girls.

== Partial filmography ==
- 1984-1986: Mirror in the Sun (TV series)
- 1998: A Place Called Home (short film)
- 2003: For Better, For Worse
- 2005: Prince of the Savannah
- 2013: Flower Girl - as Mrs. Ada
- 2015: Royal Castle (TV series)
- 2016-2017: Hush (TV Series) - as Ida Investo
