= Alufohai =

Alufohai is a surname. Notable people with the surname include:

- Auzoyah Alufohai (born 1996), American football player
- Ibife Alufohai (born 1986), Nigerian model, beauty pageant titleholder, and philanthropist
