= Tammy Danagogo =

Nigerian lawyer and politician

Secretary to the State Government of Rivers State
- Incumbent
- Assumed office 29 May 2019

Personal details
- Born: 22 September 1970 (age 56) Abonnema, Akuku-Toru, Rivers State, Nigeria
- Party: People's Democratic Party (PDP)
- Education: Rivers State University of Science and Technology
- Profession: Politician

Tamunobaabo Wenike Danagogo (born 22 September 1970) is a Nigerian politician, lawyer, and the current Secretary to the State Government of Rivers State since May 2019. Before that, he was the Minister of Sports in the Federal Republic of Nigeria. He is a graduate of the Rivers State University of Science and Technology and the University of Nigeria, Nsukka.

== Education ==
Danagogo received his primary education in 1981 from St. Joseph State School in Abonnema, Rivers State. He proceeded to gain his secondary education in 1986 from Nyemoni Grammar School, Abonnema. In 1990, Danagogo graduated with an LL.B in Law from the Rivers State University of Science and Technology. He went on to attend the Nigerian Law School in 1991, and subsequently obtained his LL.M in Law from the same Nigerian Law School in 1997. In 2005, Danagogo furthered his education by attaining his Doctor of Philosophy, Ph.D. in Private and Public Law with Specialization in Human Rights and Disputes Settlement from the University of Nigeria, Nsukka.

== Career ==
=== Law ===
After he graduated from the Nigerian Law School, Danagogo served as a Solicitor in Austin Mamedu Co. between 1991 and 1992 for his National Youth Service Corps Programme. Danagogo later served as a Litigation's Solicitor with C.V George Will & Co. from 1992 to 1995. He later served as a Principal Partner in Alaba Chambers between 1995 and 2004.

=== Politics ===
Danagogo kicked off his political career in 2004 when he was elected Executive Chairman of Akuku Toru Local Government Area, Rivers State, Nigeria. In November 2008, he served as Commissioner of Chieftaincy and Community Affairs under former Governor Rotimi Amaechi's. He further served as a Commissioner for Urban Development in Rivers State but later resigned in December 2013. Danagogo served as a Minister of Sports and the Chairman of the National Sports Commission in 2014 during Goodluck Jonathan's Administration. His leadership caused a revolutionary growth in the Sports Industry in Nigeria. Tammy Danagogo is the current Secretary to the State Government of Rivers State ever since he was appointed by Governor Nyesom Wike in May 2019.
