= ACE Charity Foundation =

Nigerian charity

- Founded: 2010
- Founder: Kiki James
- Location: Abuja, Nigeria
- Website: https://www.acecharityafrica.org

ACE Charity (Assisting, Empowering and Caring) is a non-profit organization based in Nigeria. It focuses on educating and training children, providing affordable healthcare, and to generate economic empowerment in the country. It has implemented development and humanitarian interventions aimed at improving the living conditions of orphans, and vulnerable children (especially adolescent girls) and women in Nigeria," praised BellaNaija, a lifestyle and entertainment website. It aims to provide quality education for underprivileged people all over Africa starting with Nigeria.

During a charity dinner at Transcorp Hilton Hotel Abuja on November 26, 2016, it raised millions of naira with the intention to "provide access to literacy and support the development of quality education for underprivileged children in Nigeria and Africa."

== Initiatives ==
The foundation started a learning empowerment program (ACE Radio School) to help primary and secondary school children learn STEM subjects while at home without access to online learning during the COVID-19 pandemic. The radio program is broadcast several days a week in nine states in Nigeria.

It also provided access to literacy and numeracy skills to out-of-school children in communities in Sokoto State in learning centers called 'safe spaces'.

The charity was also an advocator for the enactment of the Child Rights Act, which grants children the right to education for nine years. The founder of the organization, Kiki James, has been given the title of a Malala Fund Gulmaki Champion for "promoting girl child education in Nigeria". In October 2023, ACE Radio School was selected as one of the top 100 organizations globally and top 3 in Africa for innovative education by The Hundred Organization.

ACE's Business Empowerment Program for Women is a yearly program that equips women with basic sewing skills and business skills needed to establish their own businesses. The program lasts six months. In the three years from 2017 to 2020, it trained 24 women.

The 'Careers at Hilton' program aims to give selected Nigerian youth transferable skills through work experience and mentoring at Transcorp Hilton.

The mobile clinics owned by ACE provide free healthcare services to Indigenous Peoples of rural communities.

It helps to collect, recycle, and distribute used soaps discarded by the Transcorp Hilton in Abuja.
