= Bikiya Graham-Douglas =

Nigerian-born British actress

- Born: 4 March; Port-Harcourt, Rivers State
- Education: University of Portsmouth London Academy of Music and Dramatic Art
- Occupations: Actress/performing artist, Producer
- Years active: 2009–present
- Parent: Alabo Tonye Graham-Douglas (father)

Bikiya Graham-Douglas is a Nigerian actress, producer, cultural advocate, and jazz singer. She is best known for roles in Wrath and Revenge, Battleground, and the Hollywood film The Ministry of Ungentlemanly Warfare.

Graham-Douglas is the founder of the Beeta Universal Arts Foundation (BUAF). and Beeta Productions, she has produced award-winning stage and screen works and played multiple roles in talent development and cultural exchange across Africa.

== Education and Background ==
She is the daughter of Nigerian politicians Alabo Graham-Douglas and Bolere Elizabeth Ketebu. She trained in the United Kingdom, studying at institutions such as the London Academy of Music and Dramatic Art (LAMDA), Oxford School of Drama, the Bridge Theatre Training Company, and Point Blank Music School. She also holds dual B.A. degrees in business economics and business law from the University of Portsmouth.

== Career ==
Bikiya Graham-Douglas is a Nigerian actress and producer who began her professional stage career in London with Femi Oguns' play Torn at the Arcola Theatre London. She has made appearances in multiple movies, plays, and TV productions such as Flower Girl, Shuga, Closer, Saro, For Coloured Girls, Suru L'ere, Lunch Time Heroes, Jenifa's Diary, Legacy, Battleground (2017), God Calling (2018), Code Wilo (2019), The New Normal (2020), Funmilayo Ransome-Kuti (2022), and For Amina (2025), which recently won her 2 awards. She was also featured in the Hollywood film, The Ministry of Ungentlemanly Warfare(2024) .

Graham-Douglas worked with the Africa Unite Music Group, which sponsored the first best African Act category at the MOBO Awards. On returning to Nigeria, she worked with MTV Base Africa on the first MTV Africa Music Awards (MAMA) and the National Theatre, Iganmu, Lagos, Nigeria.

As the founder of the Beeta Universal Arts Foundation (BUAF), Graham-Douglas supports an arts organization focused on promoting the arts through production and education. She has created Programs like the Beeta Playwright Competition (2016–present), the Beeta Arts Festival (2021–present), and the Beeta Creative Apprenticeship Program for Filmmakers (2024–present). BUAF was the official theatre partner for the UNESCO "Port-Harcourt world book capital 2014–2015" BUAF also launched the first indigenous playwright competition.

Bikiya is an advisor at the Ladima Foundation Africa (2019–present) and Lagos Fringe (2018–present). She served as the Executive Director of the Lagos Theatre Festival and was an advocate for the Rule of Law and Anti-Corruption (RoLAC) programme with the European Union and British Council to raise awareness on Sexual Gender-Based Violence in Nigeria. In 2019 for the 26th FESPACO, she attended as a member of the Feature film jury at Ouagadougou, Burkina Faso. She partnered with MTN on her project titled 'Beeta Playwright Competition' (BPC). She spoke at the Creative Africa Nexus at IATF in 2022 and 2024.

== Filmography ==
- Flower Girl (2013) as Stella
- Lunch Time Heroes (2015) as Mrs Aduwo
- God Calling (2018) as Simi
- New Money (2018)
- Code Wilo (2019) as Nimi
- The New Normal (2020) as Annie
- Funmilayo Ransome-Kuti (2024) as Mrs. Soetan
- The Ministry of Ungentlemanly Warfare (2024) as Madame Igbokwe

== Recognition ==
Year	Event	Prize	Work	Result	Ref
2014	Africa Magic Viewers Choice Awards (AMVCA 2014)	Best Supporting Actress in Drama category	Flower Girl.	Won	
2014	Africa Magic Viewers Choice Awards (AMVCA 2014)	TV Personality of the Year	Flower Girl.	Nominated	
2014	Nollywood Movies Awards	Best Actress, Best Movie	Flower Girl.	Won	
2014	Nigeria Entertainment Awards	Nominee, Best Supporting Actress	Flower Girl.	Won	
2022	National Association of Nigerian Theatre Arts Practitioners	Excellence Service Award		Won	
2025	Nollywood Week Film Festival (Paris)	Audience Choice Awards	For Amina	Won	
2025	Stockholm City Film Festival	Best Actress film	For Amina	Nominated	
