= Osinachi Nwachukwu =

Nigerian gospel singer (died 2022)

Background information
- Born: 12 November 1979
- Died: 8 April 2022 (aged 42)
- Spouse: Peter Nwachukwu

Osinachi Nwachukwu (12 November 1979 – 8 April 2022) was a Nigerian gospel musician. She achieved popularity through the single "Ekwueme" by Prospa Ochimana. Her death was alleged to be as a result of domestic violence. Her husband, Peter Nwachukwu, was arrested in connection with her death, found guilty, and sentenced to death.

== Early life and education ==
Osinachi Nwachukwu was born on 12 November 1979 into an Igbo family in Owerri, South East Nigeria. She attended a private school and proceeded to a private university in Nigeria.

== Career ==
Osinachi was a highly spirit-filled Nigerian Gospel musician, a minister of God, a songwriter with a great voice, and a Christian worship producer. Most of her songs were written in Igbo language. Her career reached its peak in 2017 due to the famous single "Ekwueme". She had featured in songs like " Nara Ekele" by Pastor Paul Enenche (Dunamis, Abuja), Ekwueme by Prospa Ochimana and "You no dey use me play" by Emma.

== Death ==
On 28 April 2025, an FCT High Court in Abuja sentenced Peter Nwachukwu, her husband to death by hanging for her murder. He was found culpable of her death which occurred on April 8, 2022. Her cause of death was initially reported to be throat cancer before her family revealed that she had been a victim of domestic violence.
