= Abonnema =

Town in the Kalabari Kingdom, Nigeria

Coordinates: 4.7231169°N 6.7788461°E

Abonnema is a town in Nigeria that was founded in 1882 by eleven independent, equal and autonomous founding fathers in 1882. Abonnema has no monarchy but is governed by the principle of primus inter pares, first among equals.

== Climate ==
In Abonnema, the wet season is overcast and warm, the dry season is hot and mostly overcast, and it is oppressive year round. Over the course of the year, the temperature typically varies from 22 °C (71 °F) to 31 °C (87 °F). Muggy conditions are least common in January.

== Abonnema Today ==
Abonnema grew to become a flourishing major Nigerian seaport during the colonial era. It was host to many European companies. One such company was the Royal Niger Company, which later metamorphosed into U.A.C.

Abonnema is the headquarters of Akuku-Toru Local Government Area of Rivers State in Nigeria.

== Notable people ==
- HRM Chief Disreal Gbobo Bob-Manuel, (Owukori IX), lawyer, Amayanabo (King) of Abonnema
- Henry Odein Ajumogobia, federal minister of Nigeria
- Tammy Danagogo, director-general of the E-Processing Center
- Onari Duke, first lady of Cross River State (1999 - 2007)
- A. Igoni Barrett, writer
- O.B. Lulu Briggs, philanthropist, statesman and business mogul
- Nimi Briggs, academic
- Roseberry Briggs, politician
- Patrick Dele Cole, ambassador to Brazil
- Dumo Lulu-Briggs, business magnate, philanthropist and politician
- Tonye Cole, business magnate and politician
- Reynolds Bekinbo Dagogo-Jack, politician
- Sumner Dagogo-Jack, politician and chair of the Electoral Commission
- Agbani Darego, first native African to win Miss World
- Ibife Alufohai, winner, Miss Valentine International 2010 and Founder of Miss Polo International
- Alabo Graham-Douglas, politician
- Bikiya Graham-Douglas, actress and singer
- Nimi Wariboko, renowned academic and professor
- Nabo Graham-Douglas, SAN, federal attorney-general and commissioner for Justice
