= Suleiman Takuma =

Nigerian politician

Alhaji Suleiman Takuma (14 April 1934 – 4 September 2001) was a Nigerian Journalist, civil servant, politician, and businessman. He served as the National Secretary of the now defunct National Party of Nigeria (NPN) and later as a Political Adviser to President Shehu Shagari, the only President from that party. He was also one of the founding members of the United Nigerian Congress (UNC), (which later merged with United Nigerian Party (UNP) to form UNCP United Nigerian Congress Party) for which he served as National Administrative Secretary. This was during the regime of the late Gen. Sani Abacha.

After this, he withdrew from politics for a while, until becoming one of the founding fathers of the People's Democratic Party (PDP) and serving in the role of chairman on the Obasanjo '99 Campaign Committee. He later served the role of board member and Head of the Procurement Committee in the National Fertilizer Company Of Nigeria (NAFCON). He was also appointed Chairman of Duke Oil (NNPC Trading), which is based in Europe, but died shortly before he could assume this post.

== Early life and qualifications ==
A Nupe Muslim from Takuma, Niger State, Takuma went to elementary school at Mokwa between 1942 and 1945, before proceeding to Niger Middle School, Bida between 1946 and 1949. He finished his secondary school between 1950 and 1953 at Government Secondary School (Barewa College), Zaria then proceeded to Nigeria College of Arts Science & Technology, Zaria, between 1954 and 1956.

Takuma had early qualifications i.e., Cambridge School Certificate II in 1952, he also had G.C.E. A/L- English Literature and History in 1956.

== Administrative career/political career ==
He started a career in broadcasting at the Nigerian Broadcasting Corporation (NBC) in 1957 to 1967 as a program officer.

Takuma was public relations manager for Northern States at United African Company of Nigeria (UAC) between 1967 and 1972.

Takuma was Secretary, Northern States Marketing Board between 1973 and 1975.

He was permanent secretary, Niger State Ministry of Trade, Industries & Co-operative. 1976–1977.

Takuma first gained notoriety for criticizing the Aguiyi-Ironsi administration's handling of the January 1966 coup suspects while he was working at a radio station. As one of the major NPN secretariat officials during the Second Republic, he had brushes with the Unity Party of Nigeria (UPN) and its leader, Obafemi Awolowo.

Takuma was elected Member of Constituent Assembly in 1977.

He was elected publicity secretary, National Party of Nigeria (NPN), in 1979.

Elected National Secretary, NPN in 1980.

In 1983, Takuma was appointed special adviser on political matters to the president of the Federal Republic of Nigeria.

Takuma was also Member/Fellow of Professional Bodies i.e.; British Institute of Public Relations (1970), Nigeria Institute of Management (1969), Nigeria Institute of Public Relations (1996), Nigeria Institute of Journalism (1996).

He also attended some Professional & Management Trainings i.e.; Senior Administrative Training (ASCON) in 1976, Public Relations Professional Training, London in 1970. He was at the Advance Management Training - Ashridge College - UK.

== Traditional titles ==
Suleiman Takuma held the traditional title of Sarkin Malamai Nupe. When translated this means Chief of the Clerics.
