= Precious Okoye =

Nigerian model

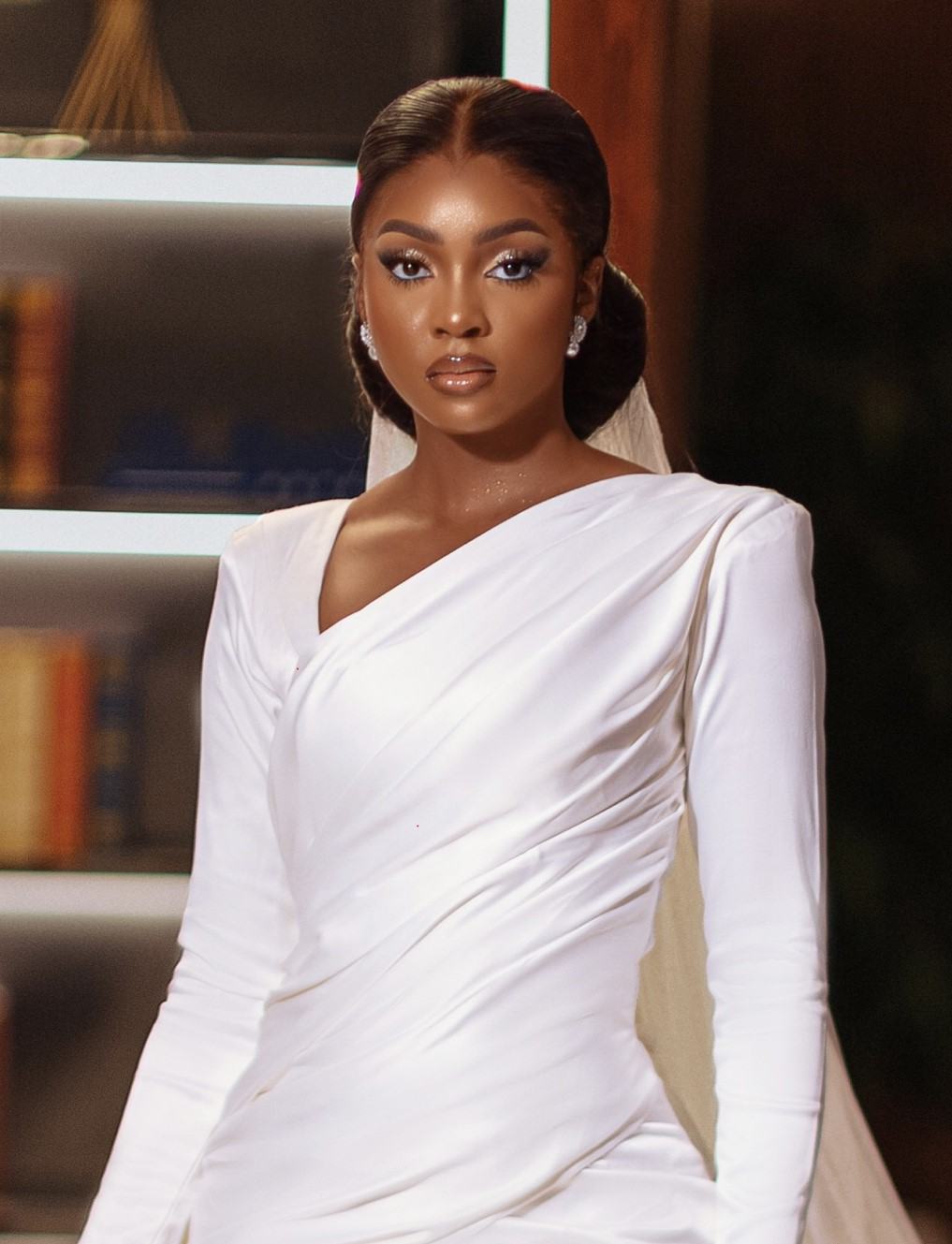
- Born: Precious Onyinye Okoye; 17 February 1995 (age 31); Lagos, Nigeria
- Education: University of Lagos
- Height: 1.72 m (5 ft 8 in)
- Beauty pageant titleholder
- Hair colour: Black
- Eye colour: Brown
- Major competitions: Miss Polo Nigeria; Miss Polo International (Top 5); Miss Earth Nigeria 2018; Miss Africa 2022

Precious Okoye // (born 17 February 1995) is a Nigerian model and entrepreneur, she is a beauty pageant titleholder and the winner of the Miss Africa 2022.

== Career ==
She started modelling in 2013 in Lagos. In 2017, she won the face of Black Opal Nigeria.

=== Miss Polo Nigeria ===
She was crowned the winner and queen of the 2019 edition of the Miss Polo Nigeria held in Lagos, Nigeria on the 24th July, 2019. The pageantry drew 35 contestants each representing each state in Nigeria.

=== Miss Polo International ===
Precious represented Nigeria at the Miss Polo International 2019 edition, held on 14 September 2019 at Jumeirah Zabeel Saray, Dubai, where she won the Miss Polo Africa title and placed top 5. 23 delegates and models from other countries contested in the pageantry.

=== Miss Africa 2022 ===
She participated as the Nigerian delegate in the Miss Africa pageant held in Calabar, Cross River State. The competition featured 17 contestants from various African nations. She won and became the first Nigerian to win the Miss Africa Pageant.

Awards and achievements
Preceded by Stella Whyte	Miss Polo Nigeria; 2019	Incumbent
Preceded by Sheila Kanini	Miss Polo Africa; 2019	Incumbent
Preceded by Sarra Sellimi	Miss Africa; 2022	Incumbent
