= Flower Girl (2013 film) =

2013 film by Michelle Bello

- Theatrical Poster
- Directed by: Michelle Bello
- Written by: Jigi Bello
- Produced by: Michelle Bello; Michelle Dede
- Starring: Damilola Adegbite; Chris Attoh; Blossom Chukwujekwu; Eku Edewor; Bikiya Graham-Douglas; Patrick Doyle
- Cinematography: James M. Costello
- Edited by: Jigi Bello
- Music by: Joe Hogue
- Production company: Blu Star Entertainment
- Distributed by: Blu Star Entertainment; Talking Drum Entertainment
- Release dates: 14 February 2013 (Nigeria); 5 May 2013 (Ghana); 3 October 2013 (United States); 4 October 2013 (UK)
- Running time: 79 minutes
- Country: Nigeria
- Language: English
- Budget: ₦50 million (est)
- Box office: ₦29,763,854 (domestic gross)

Flower Girl is a 2013 Nigerian romantic comedy film directed and produced by Michelle Bello and Michelle Dede. It was distributed by Blue Star Entertainment in Nigeria and Gravitas ventures internationally. The film was directed by Michelle Bello. The film stars Damilola Adegbite as a hopeless romantic florist who dreams of marrying her long-time boyfriend Umar (Chris Attoh). Though he promises to marry her once he becomes a partner at the law firm he works for, she becomes impatient.

Flower Girl premiered on Valentine's Day to mixed reviews from critics, with praise for the performances and chemistry of Adegbite and Attoh, and criticism for its predictable storyline and pacing. The film emerged as a box-office success in Nigeria, grossing over ₦50 million against a budget of approximately ₦10 million.

== Plot ==
Kemi, a young florist working at her parents' flower shop in Lagos, dreams of marrying her long-term boyfriend, Umar, a lawyer, who has promised to propose once he gets a promotion. Kemi eagerly anticipates the proposal, spending her time planning the perfect wedding.

When Umar finally gets his promotion, Kemi expects a proposal but is devastated when Umar breaks up with her instead, saying he needs space to focus on his career. Heartbroken and distraught, Kemi is involved in a minor accident while delivering flowers. The driver who hits her is Tunde Kelani, a famous Nollywood movie star. After helping Kemi, Tunde listens to her story of heartbreak and offers to help her get Umar back by pretending to be her new boyfriend to make him jealous.

Kemi agrees to the plan, and Tunde begins publicly posing as her new love interest. As the fake relationship unfolds, Umar starts to notice and becomes jealous, though his reactions are not as straightforward as Kemi had hoped. Meanwhile, as Kemi and Tunde spend more time together, Tunde develops genuine feelings for her.

As the plot progresses, Kemi questions her desire to marry Umar, realizing she enjoys Tunde's attention and care. Torn between her long-time relationship with Umar and her growing connection with Tunde, Kemi must decide what she truly wants. In the end, Kemi’s journey leads her to a deeper understanding of herself, forcing her to make a difficult choice about her future and who she wants to be with.

== Themes ==
The film explores themes of self-discovery, particularly in the realm of romantic relationships. It challenges traditional notions of love and marriage, suggesting that personal happiness and fulfillment take precedence over simply adhering to societal norms. Flower Girl also highlights the social pressures surrounding marriage in contemporary Nigerian society, particularly the expectations placed on women to secure a marriage proposal. Through Kemi's journey, the film emphasizes the importance of individual growth and finding one's own path, rather than conforming to external expectations.

== Casting ==
Similar to her approach with Small Boy, director Michelle Bello introduced new faces to the secondary roles in Flower Girl, opting to blend the main cast with emerging young actors. For many of these actors, including TV star Damilola Adegbite, this marked her first experience acting in a Nigerian feature film. The cast had to adapt to Bello's unique directorial style and techniques throughout their weeks of rehearsal, allowing them to grow into their roles and bring fresh energy to the film.

- Damilola Adegbite as Kemi Williams, a young romantic florist who works for her parents while constantly dreaming of her perfect wedding day.
- Chris Attoh as Umar Abubakar, Kemi’s long-time boyfriend. He's an ambitious young lawyer, anxious to rapidly climb the ladder in the law firm where he works.
- Blossom Chukwujekwu as Tunde Kelani, the hot Nollywood film star. The decision to cast Chukwujekwu in this role was unanimous. Chukwujekwu said that he was attracted to the movie's message and how it was written.
- Eku Edewor as Sapphire, Tunde’s on-and-off sexy, vixen girlfriend who blackmails Tunde without any hesitation.
- Bikiya Graham-Douglas as Stella, Kemi’s quirky, outrageous best friend. Says Graham-Douglas, "Stella is energetic, flamboyant, unapologetic, full of life and she’s very caring....". Says Bello, "Graham-Douglas was a ball of energy on set".
- Patrick Doyle as Kemi’s eccentric father, Mr. Williams.
- Teni Aofiyebi as Mrs. Ada, the queen of the tabloid industry.
- Tosan Edremoda-Ugbeye as Funke Williams, Kemi’s sweet, loving mother.
- Ahide Adum as Tunde’s wealthy father and agent, Sule Kulani.
- Grace Agu as Taiwo, a snooty sales assistant
- Angela Adiele as Morenike, the second snobbish sales assistant
- Jude Orhorha as Mr. Odo, Umar’s boss in the law firm

== Production ==
Michelle Bello began developing the initial rough draft for Flower Girl while studying for her master's degree in communication at Regent University in Virginia, United States. The class assignment was to write a full-length feature film script, which was a new challenge for her. Reflecting on a story exciting enough to expand into a ninety-page script, she turned to her love of romantic comedies.

Bello said, "I’ve always been a romantic at heart and could often relate to the main characters and their experiences. I wanted to take this genre and adapt it to a modern-day setting in Lagos, Nigeria. I wanted to explore a whole range of colorful characters—both their good sides and their bad sides—because, at the end of the day, no one is perfect."

In just two months, Bello wrote the first draft of Flower Girl, initially titled Caught Up. She incorporated relationship issues faced by young couples in Nigerian society to make the story relatable for younger audiences. Bello fondly remembers her professor’s approval, stating, "I remember my screenwriting professor really liked the first draft of the script because he gave me an A, so I was really happy. At that time, I never really thought of it as my second feature film. It was only when brainstorming with my brother, who wrote the final script, that I realized this story would be perfect to shoot back home due to its international theme and crossover appeal."

Screenwriter Jigi Bello expressed that Flower Girl offered a unique opportunity to create a cinematic world that would resonate with Nigerian audiences. He explained, "As a Nigerian, it was exciting to explore characters in the newly emerging middle class. The story begins with a real group of characters you might encounter on a Lagos street: the romantic, the playboy, the businessman, the mentor. Through a twist of fate, these characters discover each other."

"The fun for me as a writer, and where the comedy comes from, is the honesty of these characters to their own beliefs, no matter how crazy the situation," Jigi Bello added. "I hope others enjoy the story as much as I did."

Co-producer Michelle Dede highlighted the challenges of producing a film in Nigeria, stating, "Producing a film, especially in Nigeria, is not the easiest thing to do. It was very rewarding because of the experience of being on a film set and all the little things that go into making a movie possible."

== Music ==
Music was composed by Hitplay. Several additional songs include:

- "Ma Se Yen" – performed by Lesoul
- "Falling for You" – performed by Kaline
- "Fine Lady" – performed by Lynxxx
- "Best in Me" – performed by Efya

== Release ==
The world premiere of Flower Girl took place on 13 February 2013 in Lagos, Nigeria, followed by a general release in Nigeria on Valentine’s Day 2013.

The Ghana premiere occurred on 5 May 2013 in Accra, where demand was so high that it had to be shown in an additional cinema hall on opening night.

The UK premiere was held on 26 September 2013 at the Odeon Cinema in Greenwich. A new edited version of the romantic comedy was distributed by Talking Drum Entertainment UK and released in selected Odeon, Vue, Cineworld, and independent cinemas across the UK on 4 October 2013.

Flower Girl was also featured at the Hollywood Black Film Festival 2013, where it had its US premiere on 3 October 2013 in Los Angeles.

The film was released on Netflix on 13 July 2021.

== Reception ==
Flower Girl premiered on Valentine's Day to mixed reviews from critics, with praise for the performances and chemistry of Adegbite and Attoh, and criticism for its predictable storyline and pacing.

== Awards ==
Year	Award	Category	Result	Ref
2013	Black International Film Festival U.K	Best African Film	Won	
2014	Nollywood Movies Awards	Best Set Design	Won	
2014	Nollywood Movies Awards	Best Sound Design	Won	
2014	Nollywood Movies Awards	Best Soundtrack (Efya)	Won	
2014	Nollywood Movies Awards	Best Editing	Won	
2014	Nollywood Movies Awards	Best Movie	Nominated	
2014	Nollywood Movies Awards	Best Lead Female	Nominated	
2014	Nollywood Movies Awards	Best Actress in a Supporting Role	Nominated	
2014	Nollywood Movies Awards	Best Director	Nominated	
2014	Nollywood Movies Awards	Best Cinematography	Nominated	
2014	Screen Nation Awards	Favourite New Nollywood Film	Won	
2014	Africa Magic Viewer's Choice Awards	The Trailblazer Award	Won	
2014	Africa Magic Viewer's Choice Awards	Best Supporting Actress	Won	
2014	Africa Magic Viewer's Choice Awards	Best Script (Comedy)	Won	

== Legacy ==
The success of Flower Girl marked a significant moment in Nollywood, particularly for the romantic comedy genre. It helped establish Michelle Bello as a noteworthy director and highlighted the potential of Nigerian cinema to produce high-quality romantic comedies. The film’s popularity has since inspired other filmmakers to explore similar themes, further enriching the industry’s offerings in this genre

== See also ==
- List of Nigerian films of 2013
