= Ladima Foundation =

The Ladima Foundation, founded in 2017, is a pan-African non-profit organization aiming to promote women in the TV and film industry. It is based in Cape Town.

The Ladima Foundation was co-founded by Lara Utian-Preston and Edima Otuokon. In 2018 it launched the A-List, a database of women professionals working in the industry across Africa. In 2019 the Foundation announced their advisory board, comprising Biola Alabi, Themba Bhebhe, Catherine Gitahi, Bikiya Graham-Douglas, Charlotte Giese, Nse Ikpe-Etim, Fibby Kioria, Elias Ribeiro, Monica Rorvik and Debra Zimmerman.
