= Nimi Wariboko =

Professor of social ethics

Professor Nimi Wariboko
- Occupation: Academic

Nimi Wariboko (born April 4, 1962) is an academic and Walter G. Muelder Professor of Social Ethics at Boston University, United States. He was born in Abonnema, Rivers State, Nigeria. With a background in economics he worked as a banker in Lagos and as a strategy consultant to some of the top investment banks on Wall Street. Previously he also worked as a journalist in Lagos. He is today primarily known as an academic and ethicist but also continues to act as a management consultant to governments and corporations. Professor Wariboko has published extensively in the fields of Christian ethics and economics including God and Money: A Theology of Money in a Globalizing World which argues for a denationalized global currency.

== Selected publications ==
- Wariboko, Nimi (1999). Counterfoil Choices in the Kalabari Life Cycle, African Studies Quarterly, Volume 3, Issue 1
- Wariboko, Nimi (2009). The Principle of Excellence: A Framework for Social Ethics. Lexington Books
