= Ghana Must Go (film) =

2016 film by Frank Rajah Arase

- Directed by: Frank Rajah Arase
- Produced by: Yvonne Okoro
- Starring: Yvonne Okoro; Blossom Chukwujekwu; Nkem Owoh
- Production company: Desamour Company
- Release date: June 4, 2016; Nigeria
- Countries: Ghana; Nigeria

Ghana Must Go is a 2016 Ghana-Nigerian romantic comedy film, directed by Frank Rajah Arase. It stars Yvonne Okoro, Blossom Chukwujekwu and Nkem Owoh. This is the second film from Desamour Company, since Contract. The film was screened privately at Filmhouse Cinemas, Surulere in May 2016.

== Plot ==
The film tells a story of two lovers of different countries of origin, and the challenges they faced, especially from parents, after disclosing their intention of getting married.

== Cast ==
- Yvonne Okoro as Ama
- Ik Ogbonna
- Blossom Chukwujekwu as Chuks
- Helen Paul
- Ada Ameh
- Nkem Owoh

== Plot ==
The film starts with Chuks (Blossom Chukwujekwu), a young man from a low class Nigerian family and Ama (Yvonne Okoro), a young woman from a wealthy Ghanaian household returning to Ghana from schooling in London. Both have been in a relationship for a while, and on the introduction of Bloom as a Nigerian to the family of Ama, their relationship gets threatened due to the stereotyped perception of her family towards Nigerians. Okoro's father, Kofi Adjorlolo is the most irritated by the relationship especially due to the manner Nigerian authorities handled Ghana Must Go situation in the early 80s. On discovery that his daughter was already married to Chuks, Kofi tried to manage the situation more favorably, but things got worse when his eccentric son, IK Ogbonna picks the family of Chuks, consisting of Nkem Owoh, Helen Paul and Ada Ameh at the airport on an invitation from Chuks. After several ups and down from the culture shock caused by the economic and ethnic differences between both families, the couple finally renewed their vows in Ghana with the presence and blessings of their parents.

== Reception ==
Yvonne Chinyere Anoruo of Olisa TV praised the acting of the main characters in the film. However, she noted that the film incorrectly tried to place Ghana as more developed and enlightened than Nigeria. So, she concluded her review by saying that the film was "very entertaining and enlightening even with its candid bites into history. So pause from worrying about the flailing economy and notorious power failure of the recent days and go calm your mind".

Andrew Oke of cinema review gave credit to the acting of the main character, but noted that the movie was poorly produced and managed. The movie in review was likened to a pot of soup that had all the necessary ingredients but came out poor because it was not done with the touch of an expert.

Chidumga Izuzu of Pulse Nigeria summarized her review by stating that the film "is a well-made movie with often very funny scenes".
