= Ephraim Akpata =

Nigerian judge and electoral administrator (1927–2000)

Ephraim Ibukun Akpata

1st Chairman of the Independent National Electoral Commission
- In office 1998 – January 2000
- Preceded by: Sumner Dagogo-Jack
- Succeeded by: Abel Guobadia

Justice of Supreme Court
- In office 1993–Unknown

Personal details
- Born: 15 April 1927 Edo State
- Died: 8 January 2000 (aged 72)
- Citizenship: Nigerian

Ephraim Omorose Ibukun Akpata (15 April 1927 – 8 January 2000) was a Justice of the Supreme Court of Nigeria and the first chairman of the Independent National Electoral Commission (INEC) of Nigeria, responsible for the 1998/1999 elections that re-introduced democracy in May 1999.

== Background ==
Ephraim Akpata was born in 1927 in Edo State. He attended King's College, Lagos and went on to study law. In his book 888 Days in Biafra, Samuel Enadeghe Umweni recollects how Lawyer Akpata twice made the dangerous journey across the front lines to visit him while he was held prisoner by the breakaway Biafran troops during the Nigerian Civil War (1967–1970). Akpata became a justice of the Supreme court, retiring in 1993 at the age of 65. He was appointed to head the INEC in 1998 when General Abdulsalam Abubakar's Administration established the INEC to organise the transitional elections that ushered in the Nigerian Fourth Republic on 29 May 1999.

== Formation of parties ==
To avoid splits along ethnic lines, Akpata stipulated that only parties with broad-based national support would be allowed to contest the elections. He ruled that political parties must win local government electoral seats in at least ten states to qualify for the gubernatorial, state assembly, national assembly and presidential elections. Of 26 political associations, he gave provisional registration as political parties for the 1998/1999 elections to only nine, with only three parties finally qualifying to compete in the State and National elections. This caused the formation of coalitions of smaller associations, such as the Group of 34 which formed the new People's Democratic Party (PDP).

Coalitions had to become genuine parties. In January 1999 Akpata said that the electoral alliance announced between the Alliance for Democracy (AD) and All People's Party (APP) "appeared to contravene INEC rules". He said the two parties wanted to "derive the benefits of a merger without going through with one". Akpata was critical of the process through which the PDP selected its candidates, saying it fell "short of the level of transparency expected from a democratic process."

== Elections ==
The INEC ran a series of elections. Local Government polls were held in December 1998, with the PDP winning 59%, the APP 25.8% and the AD 13.2% of the seats. Elections for the Governorships were held in January 1999, with the PDP winning 19 out of 35 states, the APP winning 9 states and the AD winning 6 states. The elections were largely orderly and peaceful, and Akpata said they were free and fair. The elections for the House of Representatives and the Senate were held in February 1999. In the Senate the PDP won 59 seats, the APP 29 and the AD 20. In the House, the PDP won 206 seats, the APP 74 and the AD 68. Elections were delayed due to security reasons in Akwa Ibom, Delta, Nasarawa and Rivers states. Akpata told a news conference that although generally fair, there had been some voting irregularities. In the 27 February 1999 presidential elections, the AD and APP fielded a joint candidate, Chief Olu Falae, who lost to the PDP candidate, former General and military ruler Olusegun Obasanjo. Obasanjo gained 63% of the votes.

Akpata accepted foreign election monitors from the US-based Carter Center and the National Democratic Institute, and supported their request to train thousands of local observers. Reports from these groups on the earlier elections were generally favourable, although they noted low turn out and some irregularities. Reports on later elections were more critical, describing irregularities including inflated vote returns, ballot box stuffing, altered results, and disenfranchisement of voters. After the elections, former US President Jimmy Carter sent a letter to Akapata that said "There was a wide disparity between the number of voters observed at the polling stations and the final results that have been reported from several states. Regrettably, therefore, it is not possible for us to make an accurate judgment about the outcome of the presidential election." Olu Falae later alleged that the election was massively rigged in favour of the PDP.

Justice Ephraim Akpata died on 8 January 2000 at the age of 72.

== Bibliography ==
- Ephraim Akpata (1994). Justice for all and by all. B & C Publishers. ISBN 978-32981-0-0.
- Ephraim Akpata (1997). The Nigerian arbitration law in focus. West African Book Publishers. ISBN 978-153-044-8.
