= Child Rights Act in Nigeria =

2003 act adopted in Nigeria to protect children's rights

Child's Right Act of 2003

5th Nigeria National Assembly
- Long title: An Act to provide and protect the rights of a Nigerian child; and other related matters
- Territorial extent: Federal Capital Territory
- Signed by: President Olusegun Obasanjo
- Commenced: July 31, 2003

Legislative history
- First reading: 1993
- Committee stage: 2002
- Third reading: 2003

Related legislation
- UN Convention on the Rights of the Child; African Charter on the Rights and Welfare of the Child; Child Rights Law 2007; Children and Young Persons Law 1976

Related cases
- Akpan Vs. Akpan (No. OR/ACC/95/2004)
- Status: Current legislation

The Child Rights Act in Nigeria is legislation passed into law in 2003 by the Nigeria National Assembly. It expands the constitutionally protected rights of Nigerian children, supplements the 1999 constitution of Nigeria, and domesticates the Convention on the Rights of the Child. It is 230 pages long and contains 278 sections.

Since this law was passed at the federal level it applied only to Federal Capital Territory, thus requiring states to independently pass the law as well.

== History ==
Following earlier unsuccessful attempts dating back to the 1990s the bill was reintroduced and debated in 2002, but did not pass then due to opposition from the Supreme Council for Shari'a and other religious and traditional groups.

The act was eventually passed into law in 2003 by former President Chief Olusegun Obasanjo after sustained advocacy by national stakeholders, international organizations, and media campaigns.

== Contents ==
The Child Rights Act is 230 pages long and contains 278 sections.

- Part I establishes that the best interests of the child shall be of paramount consideration in all actions concerning children. It states that the parent or legal guardian has a duty to provide basic protection for the child.
- Part II incorporates Article IV of Nigeria's 1999 constitution and other federal laws related to the fundamental rights into the act. It outlines the rights, freedoms, and responsibilities of children, including the right to survival, a name, family life, privacy, dignity, recreation, cultural activities, healthcare, and education.
- Part III outlines protection for children, including a prohibition on child marriage and penalties for adults involved in such practices. It also prohibits harmful practices such as tattoos, sexual violence, exploitative labor, and the use of children in military operations.
- Part IV details the circumstances under which a child assessment order may be issued and the conditions and duration of emergency protection orders. It also outlines the obligations of the state government when it is reported that a child is at risk or has been harmed.
- Part V outlines the circumstances in which a child shall be brought to court to determine if they need protection. It also specifies the type of person who may make such a decision, using the guidelines detailed in this section.
- Part VI enumerates the ways and manner in which a court must proceed after a child assessment order is made.
- Part VII allows for the court to use paternity tests to make decisions in civil proceedings when it is unclear who the parents of a child are.
- Part VIII shows how decisions should be made about the custody of a child.
- Part IX details who is allowed guardianship and how guardianship over a child may be transferred from one adult to another.
- Part X establishes how a child becomes a ward of the court, that there may be payments required of a previous guardian for the "maintenance" of their child, and the rules regarding how a child may be released back into the custody of a guardian.
- Part XI outlines the circumstances in which a child may be fostered, how an adult may apply to foster a child, and the rules that the adult fostering the child must adhere to.
- Part XII requires that each state of Nigeria create a system for adoption services. It also outlines the adoption application process and stipulates that the person wishing to adopt a child must reside in the state where the child currently lives.
- Part XIII creates a system of family courts with two levels, establishes a right to legal counsel for all children, and devises safeguards within a trial that are meant to protect the child, such as the withholding of the child's name, school pictures, or any identifying features.
- Part XIV mandates that every state create a registry that shall track the names of the children being supervised as well as the names of the individual nannies or day care providers who are tasked with watching the children. It also grants the government the power to inspect any premises in which "child minding" occurs.
- Part XV outlines the instances where a state's government is required to step in to protect the welfare of children.
- Parts XVI-XVIII specify the types of housing that may be established to house children: community homes (housing for children whether under the care of the government or not), voluntary homes, and registered children's homes.
- Part XIX establishes that a minister may grant the inspection of children's homes for the reasons listed in the clause.
- Part XX grants children the right to privacy in the court system. It also makes it clear that children are to be tried in the child justice system, not in the courts where adults are tried, and that within the Nigerian Police Force there must be individuals trained specifically to handle children. It outlines the procedures from a child's arrest to their treatment in an institution.
- Part XXI shows how "supervision officers" are appointed as well as the duties of the specially appointed officers.
- Part XXII specifies that this act allows for the minister to create specific institutions meant to meet the needs of children. These centres include (but are not limited to): Children's Residential Centres, Emergency Protection Centres, and a Children's Correction Centre.
- Part XXIII creates the National Child Rights Implementation Committee, which must consist of a representative from fourteen of Nigeria's government bodies. The function of the committee is to take actions that will lead to the observance of the act itself, as well as of other human rights treaties Nigeria has signed on to.
- Part XXIV, titled "Miscellaneous", touches on some of the legal implications any corporation may face for not following this act. This section also further defines terms.

== Implementation ==
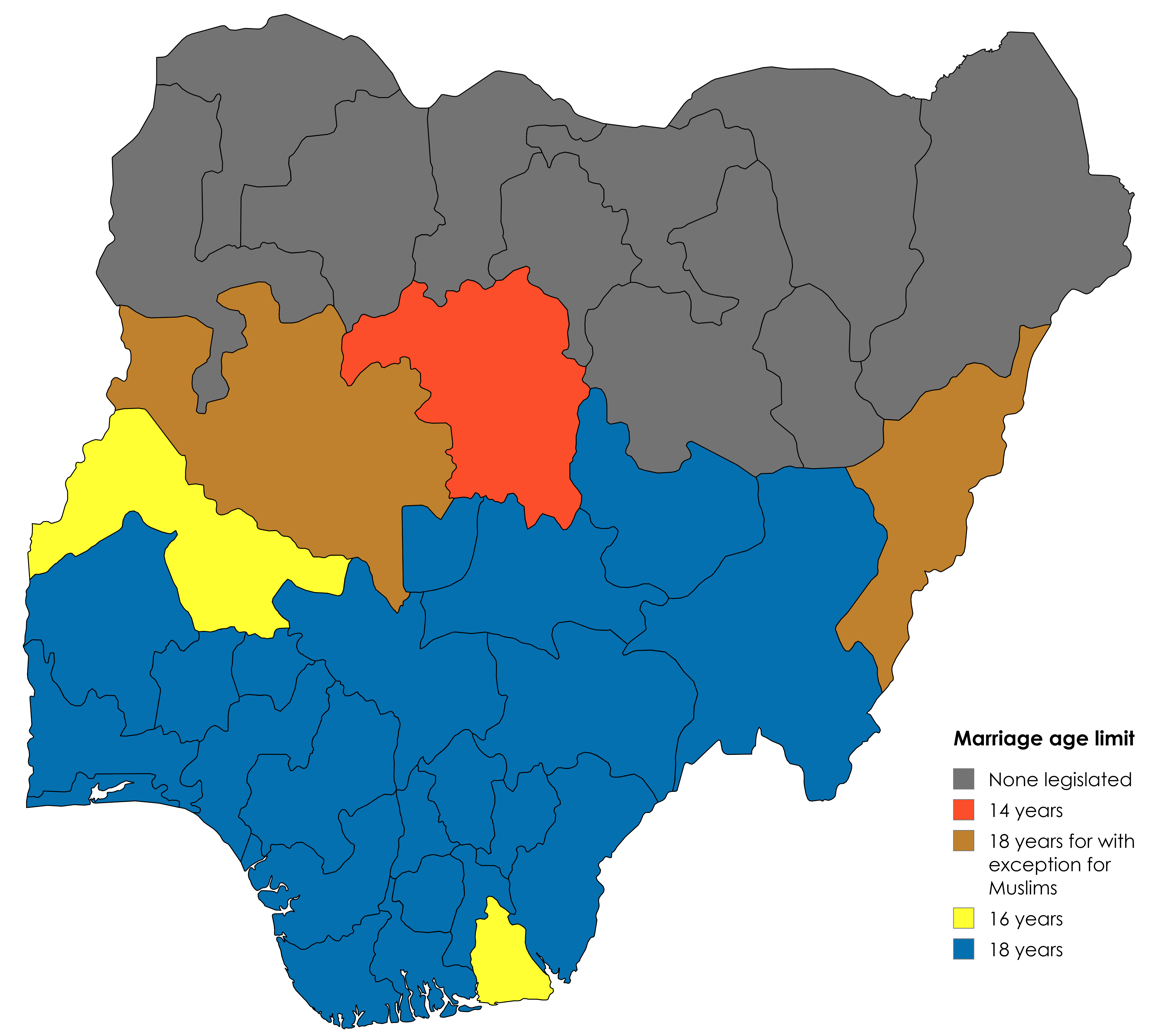
Minimum age of marriage as implemented in different states

As of February 2026, the Child Rights Act had been codified into law in 35 of Nigeria's 36 states, with all states except Gombe in the north having assented to the act in some form.

The National Child Rights Implementation Committee was established to enforce the act, and other committees were also established in some of the states that have ratified the act. The national committee listed the five top priorities for addressing the needs of children:

- Establishing a safe water supply and sanitation
- Working on the HIV/AIDS epidemic
- Creating job opportunities for women so they are better able to take care of their children
- Providing universal basic education
- Making the primary health care system better

A 2010 report noted that the capacity for monitoring and sufficiently implementing the act is low.

The Child Rights Act is difficult to enforce since it conflicts with other national laws. For example, the act defines a child as anyone under 18 years old, conflicting with the Young Persons Act, another Nigerian law, which designates a child as an individual below the age of 14. The Young Persons Act also deems individuals aged 14 to 17 to be "young people". The conflicting definitions created by these two separate laws raises issues over interpretation, and although the provisions within the Child Rights Act should be seen as overruling any other law, the fact that the Child Rights Act has not been ratified in all Nigerian States makes this difficult.

== Reactions of Religious Groups ==
There are two main ways religious groups approach the idea of human rights, the first being to think of human rights as divinely granted by God and as part of tradition. For those who practice Islam this can be seen in the symmetry between some of the rights outlined in the Universal Declaration of Human Rights and the Quran. When it comes to children's human rights there are passages in the Quran and hadith that align with the Child Rights Act of 2003. For example, the right to custody or guardianship is discussed in Q 65:7, and the right to education is expressed in Tirmidhi, Hadith 218.

However, the second way religious groups may see human rights is as an imposition by the West that is contrary to religious or cultural practices. Although there are many ways in which Islamic Law is compatible with the Child Rights Act there are five main clauses that are contrary to Islamic law within the 2003 Act.

- Firstly, the clause about child marriage in Part III states that any marriage that a child takes part in shall be considered unlawful because children are not capable of being part of a valid marriage contract. This law contradicts the Islamic doctrine that a girl's father may betroth her without obtaining her consent.
- Secondly, in Part VIII it is established that once a child is adopted their adoptive parent or parents are now solely responsible for the child, taking away the birth parents' rights to make any decisions regarding the child. The concept of the birth parents relinquishing all rights to the child is in tension with Surrah 33:4-5, where it is stated that children should remain attached to their birth parents by name.
- Thirdly, in Part VIII it is stated that when a child's parents are not married to each other at the time of the child's birth either the mother or the father can claim custody of the child. For many in the Islamic community a child being born out of wedlock is a serious matter and this clause in the Child Rights Act can be seen as too casual.
- Fourthly, in Part IX the nature of guardianship or custody stipulated in the act is the subject of tension with the Islamic community, since Islamic law generally regards the mother as the rightful steward of a child. However, the Child Rights Act considers the welfare and wants of the child as well as the capability and wishes of the parents when deciding who is going to be the child's guardian.
- Fifthly, in Part XX the stipulation of the withholding of corporal punishment from children is thought by some to be not only un-Islamic but also un-African.

== Activism ==
In 2018 teenage girls in Nigeria belonging to a group called It's Never Your Fault campaigned for the right not to be married before the age of 18, as stipulated in Part III of the Child Rights Act. They challenged a loophole in the Constitution stipulating that upon marriage a girl is legally deemed an adult, regardless of her chronological age at the time of marriage, gathering over 150,000 signatures on a petition demanding the government change the age of consent to 18. However, the situation still remained the same in 2022, despite the Child Safety Act, with girls younger than 18 still being forced to marry.
