= Presidential Task Force on Power =

PTFP Logo

The Presidential Task Force on Power (PTFP) was established by the President of the Federal Republic of Nigeria, Dr. Goodluck Ebele Jonathan's administration, in June 2010, to drive the implementation of the reform of Nigeria's power sector. It brings together all the agencies that have a role to play in removing legal and regulatory obstacles to private sector investment in the power industry. It also has the mandate to monitor the planning and execution of various short-term projects in generation, transmission, distribution and fuel-to-power that are critical to meeting the stated service delivery targets of the power reform roadmap.

PTFP Board

PTFP Team

The PTFP collaborates closely with various ministries and agencies that have specific contributions to the reform process, including the Federal Ministry of Power, the Federal Ministry of Finance, Ministry of Petroleum Resources, the Bureau of Public Enterprises (BPE), the Nigerian Electricity Regulatory Commission (NERC), the Nigerian National Petroleum Corporation (NNPC), the Bureau of Public Procurement, National Gas Company Limited (NGC) and the Power Holding Company of Nigeria (PHCN) to mention a few.

President of the Federal Republic of Nigeria, Dr. Goodluck Ebele Jonathan, reconstituted the PTFP Board, with Engr. Reynolds Bekinbo Dagogo-Jack as Chairman, on September 5, 2012.

The Presidential Task Force Board of Directors is charged with setting and maintaining the direction of the Task Force. They are responsible for implementing PTFP's mandate while providing overall leadership and its strategic direction. All Board Members have been instrumental in setting policy for the Task Force as well as ensuring it has all the necessary resources and capabilities to achieve its objective.
