= Takuma =

- Gender: Male

Origin
- Origin: Japanese
- Meaning: Different meanings depending on the kanji used

Takuma (written: 拓磨, 拓真, 拓馬, 琢磨, 匠馬, 卓磨, 卓真 or 卓馬) is a masculine Japanese given name. Notable people with the name include:

- Takuma Abe (阿部 拓馬; born 1987), Japanese footballer
- Takuma Achira (阿知羅 拓馬; born 1992), Japanese baseball player
- Takuma Aoki (青木 拓磨; born 1974), Japanese motorcycle racer
- Takuma Aoshima (青島 拓馬; born 1993), Japanese footballer
- Takuma Arano (荒野 拓馬; born 1993), Japanese footballer
- Takuma Asahara (浅原 拓真; born 1987), Japanese rugby union player
- Takuma Asano (浅野 拓磨; born 1994), Japanese footballer
- Dan Takuma (團 琢磨; 1858–1932), Japanese businessman
- Takuma Edamura (枝村 匠馬; born 1986), Japanese footballer
- Takuma Hidaka (日高 拓磨; born 1983), Japanese footballer
- Takuma Hisa (久 琢磨; 1895–1980), Japanese martial artist
- Takuma Inoue (井上 拓真; born 1995), Japanese boxer
- Takuma Ito (伊藤 拓真; born 1986), Japanese footballer
- Takuma Kato (加藤 匠馬; born 1992), Japanese baseball player
- Takuma Koga (古賀 琢磨; born 1969), Japanese footballer
- Takuma Kuroda (黒田 拓真; born 1992), Japanese footballer
- Takuma Mizutani (水谷 拓磨; born 1996), Japanese footballer
- Takuma Nagayoshi (永芳 卓磨; born 1986), Japanese footballer
- Takuma Nakahira (中平 卓馬; 1938–2015), Japanese photographer and critic
- Takuma Nishimura (西村 琢磨; 1889–1951), Imperial Japanese Army general
- Takuma Nishimura (footballer) (西村 拓真; born 1996), Japanese footballer
- Takuma Oikawa (及川 拓馬; born 1987), Japanese shogi player
- Takuma Ominami (大南 拓磨; born 1997), Japanese footballer
- Takuma Sato (佐藤 琢磨; born 1977), Japanese racing driver
- Takuma Sato (basketball) (佐藤 卓磨; born 1995), Japanese basketball player
- Takuma Shikayama (鹿山 拓真; born 1996), Japanese footballer
- Takuma Sonoda (薗田 卓馬; born 1993), Japanese footballer
- Takuma Sugano (菅野 拓真; born 1980), Japanese footballer
- Takuma Suzuki (鈴木 琢磨; born 1961), Japanese voice actor
- Takuma Takewaka (竹若 拓磨; born 1971), Japanese voice actor
- Takuma Terashima (寺島 拓篤; born 1983), Japanese voice actor and singer
- Takuma Tsuda (津田 琢磨; born 1980), Japanese footballer
- Takuma Ueda (上田 拓馬; born 1989), Japanese badminton player
- Takuma Yasui (安井 琢磨; 1909–1995), Japanese economist

Fictional characters:

- Takuma Aoi (青井 拓馬), a character in the film Battle Royale II: Requiem
- Takuma Tsurugi (剣 琢磨), a character in the film series The Street Fighter
- Takuma Sakazaki (坂崎 拓馬), Kyokugen Karate instructor in the "Art of Fighting" video games
- Takuma Kusanagi (草薙琢磨), a character from Jungle De Ikou! OVA
- Takuma Mamizuka (狸塚 拓馬), a character from the manga and anime School Babysitters, and the twin brother of Kazuma Mamizuka
- Takuma Momozuka (百束 タクマ), a character from the game Digimon Survive

Takuma (written: 宅間) is also a Japanese surname. Notable people with the surname include:

- Mamoru Takuma (宅間 守; 1963–2004), Japanese mass murderer

== See also ==
- Takuma, Kagawa, a former town in Mitoyo District, Kagawa Prefecture, Japan
