= Ibife Alufohai =

Nigerian model and founder of miss polo international

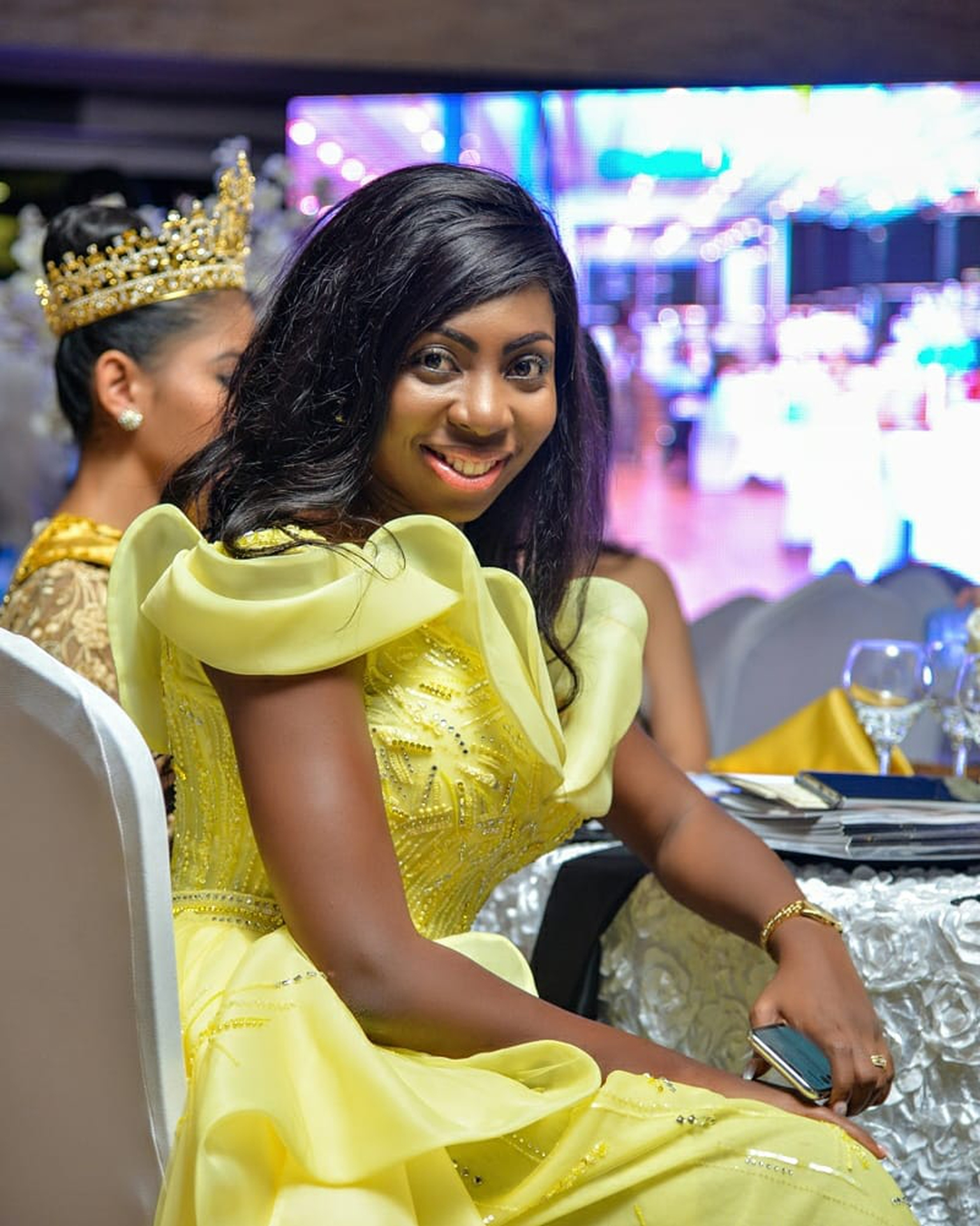
- Alufohai in 2019
- Born: Ibife Eugene Alufohai; 29 August 1986 (age 40); Calabar, Cross River State, Nigeria
- Height: 1.74 m (5 ft 8 1/2 in)
- Beauty pageant titleholder
- Title: Miss Valentine International 2010
- Hair color: Brown
- Eye color: Black
- Major competition: Miss Valentine International 2010 (Winner)

Ibife Eugene Alufohai (born 29 August 1986) is a Nigerian model, philanthropist and beauty pageant titleholder who was crowned Miss Valentine International 2010. She is the founder of Miss Polo International.

== Early life and education ==
Alufohai is from Abonnema, Rivers State. She was born in Calabar, Cross River State, and is the last out of seven children of her parents. Her family moved a lot due to her father's job as a military officer, moving from Kaduna State to Port Harcourt, Rivers State. From 1993 to 1997 she had her primary education, and secondary education at Tantua International Group of Schools from 1997 to 2003. In 2003, she went to Madonna University, Okija for her university education and proceeded to University of Port Harcourt, Rivers State in 2008, where she graduated in 2012 with a degree in Clinical psychology. After her university education, she did her National Youth Service Corps at Federal Medical Centre Yenagoa, Bayelsa State, where she practiced as a psychologist and as an operator to ECG from 2013 to 2014.

== Pageantry ==
=== Miss Valentine International 2010 ===
In 2010, Alufohai was crowned the winner of the 2010 edition of Miss Valentine International.

== Miss Polo International ==
In 2018, Alufohai started Miss Polo International. On 28 August 2018, the first edition was held in Abuja, Nigeria. On 14 September 2019, the second edition was held in Dubai, United Arab Emirates.

== Personal life ==
Alufohai is married with a daughter. As part of her philanthropy, she started Polo International Relief Foundation (PIRF). This not-for-profit platform helps to coordinate resources to assist the less privileged people across the world to ensure they have access to quality education.
