= Miss Polo International =

International beauty pageant

- Formation: 2018; 8 years ago
- Type: Beauty pageant
- Headquarters: Abuja
- Location: Nigeria
- Official language: English
- President: Ibife Alufohai
- Website: polointernational.org

Miss Polo International is an international beauty pageant with a focus on the sport of polo. It was created in Nigeria by Ibife Alufohai in 2018. It was established help give participants a platform that seeks to bring people from around the world together to promote the participation of women in global activities and improve educational opportunities.

The current titleholder of Miss Polo International 2024 is Patricia Escalante from Colombia.

== History ==
The pageant started in Abuja, Nigeria in 2018. Nasneen Sheikh from India, representing Miss Polo India was crowned the first Miss Polo International in Abuja, Nigeria. In 2019, the second edition was hosted in Dubai, United Arab Emirates, Dewanti Kumala from Indonesia, representing Miss Polo Indonesia was crowned as the winner.

Miss Polo International is a non-swimsuit/non-bikini beauty pageant instead participants have five components that go into their score: a project, an interview, fashion, sports wear, and evening gown. The aims of the pageant are to promote education and carry out charitable acts globally, especially in the most impoverished regions of the world. The pageant seeks to promote the beauty found within everyone including emotional intelligence, giftedness, and team spirit. In order to participate in the pageant contestants must have a background in volunteering in their local community. The winner of the pageant serves as an ambassador and works to improve educational initiatives and work to host fundraisers.

== Titleholders ==
Year	Miss Cosmopolitan World	Runners-up				Venue	Entrants	Ref.
Year	Miss Cosmopolitan World	First	Second	Third	Fourth	Venue	Entrants	Ref.
2018	India; Nasneen Sheikh	Cameroon; Foje Jencey	Japan; Yoho Otomo	Not awarded		Abuja, Nigeria	17	
2019	Indonesia; Dewanti Kumala	Philippines; Joanne Ayrra Averilla	Turkey; Sandra Zemaityte	Not awarded		Dubai, United Arab Emirates	30	
2020–2023 Cancelled due to the COVID-19 pandemic.
2024	Colombia; Patricia Escalante	Mexico; Esther Cardenas Camacho	United Arab Emirates; Lucy Mila	Not awarded		Dubai, United Arab Emirates		

Countries/Territories by number of wins
Country/Territory	Titles	Year(s)
Colombia	1	2024
Indonesia	1	2019
India	1	2018

Continents by number of wins
Continents	Titles	Country (Number)
Americas	0	Colombia (1)
Europe	0	
Asia	2	India (1), Indonesia (1)
Africa	0	
Oceania	0	

== See also ==
- List of beauty pageants
