= National Centre Party of Nigeria =

Defunct Nigerian political party, 1996–1998

- Abbreviation: NCPN
- Founded: 1996
- Registered: 30 September 1996
- Dissolved: July 1998
- Headquarters: Nigeria

The National Centre Party of Nigeria (NCPN) was a Nigerian political party. It was one of five parties registered by the National Electoral Commission of Nigeria (NECON) in September 1996 under the transition programme of the military government of General Sani Abacha, and was dissolved in July 1998.

== History ==
Sixteen political associations submitted completed registration applications to NECON in 1996, among them the Nigeria Centre Party. On 30 September 1996 the commission registered five: the NCPN, the United Nigeria Congress Party (UNCP), the Congress for National Consensus (CNC), the Democratic Party of Nigeria (DPN) and the Grassroots Democratic Movement (GDM). In November 1996 NECON issued registration guidelines that were described as stringent, and the five registered bodies were characterised by critics as parties aligned with the government.

The politician Bola Ige described the five collectively as the five fingers of a leprous hand, a characterisation widely repeated in later Nigerian commentary.

== Activities ==
The NCPN contested the state assembly elections of December 1997 and the National Assembly elections of 25 April 1998. The UNCP won the large majority of seats at the 1998 poll.

The parties held conventions between 6 and 9 April 1998 to select presidential candidates for a poll scheduled for 1 August. The NCPN adopted Abacha, as did the UNCP, CNC and DPN; only the GDM considered other nominees. According to a retrospective account in The Sun, Don Etiebet sought the NCPN presidential nomination and was unsuccessful; the same account describes him as having promoted and funded the party.

Following the National Assembly elections, the NCPN and the three other parties that had won few seats objected to the conduct of the poll.

== Dissolution ==
Abacha died on 8 June 1998. On 20 July 1998 General Abdulsalami Abubakar announced a fresh transition programme, cancelled the elections held under the previous one, and dissolved NECON and the five parties. The Independent National Electoral Commission was inaugurated in August 1998 and conducted the elections that produced the Fourth Republic.

== See also ==
- United Nigeria Congress Party
- Congress for National Consensus
- Grassroots Democratic Movement
- Sumner Dagogo-Jack
