= Alabo Graham-Douglas =

Nigerian politician (1939–2022)

6th Orubibi Of Abonnema Alabo Graham-Douglas
- In office 1989–1990

Federal Minister of Aviation
- In office 1990–1992

Federal Minister of Labour and Productivity
- In office June 1999 – July 2000
- Preceded by: Emmanuel Udogwu
- Succeeded by: Musa Gwadabe

Federal Minister of Culture and Tourism
- In office July 2000 – 30 January 2001
- Preceded by: Ojo Maduekwe
- Succeeded by: Boma Jack

Personal details
- Born: Alabo Tonye Graham-Douglas; 8 May 1939 Abonnema, Southern Region, British Nigeria (now in Rivers State, Nigeria)
- Died: 25 April 2022 (aged 82) Abuja, Nigeria
- Other political affiliations: PDP
- Spouse: Muriel Graham-Douglas (? – 2022)
- Children: 15
- Parent: Chief Graham Douglas (Father) Madam Botoba Bekinwari Graham douglas (Mother)
- Occupation: Politician

Chief Alabo Tonye Graham-Douglas 6th Orubibi of Abonnema, OFR, JP, DSSRS (8 May 1939 – 25 April 2022) was a Nigerian politician who was appointed Minister of Youth, Sports and Culture in 1989, then Minister of Aviation in General Ibrahim Babangida's cabinet. In 1999, he was appointed Minister of Labour and Productivity, and in 2000, Minister of Tourism in the Olusegun Obasanjo cabinet, leaving office in January 2001. He also held the traditional title of the Orubibi VI of the Royal Douglas War Canoe House of The Kalabari Kingdom, serving as a paramount leader and custodian of the customs and heritage of the Douglas House.

== Life ==
Graham-Douglas was born on 8 May 1939, in Abonnema in the Akuku-Toru Local Government Area of Rivers State. He was of Ijaw origin. His brother, Nabo Bekinbo Graham-Douglas, was the first indigenous Attorney-General of Nigeria. Another brother, Dr. Melford Graham-Douglas, was the first African surgeon under the British Technical Assistance Scheme and a fellow of several prestigious medical institutions. He was the first registrar of the Nigerian Medical Council, a founding member of the University of Lagos, and played a key role in developing healthcare infrastructure in Rivers State. Justice Donald Graham-Douglas, another brother, served as Chief Judge of Rivers State from 1979 to 1992. Tonye Graham-Douglas had over 30 siblings. His cousin, Justice Adolphus Karibi-Whyte, was a distinguished jurist who served as a Justice of the Supreme Court of Nigeria and later as a Judge at the International Criminal Tribunal for the former Yugoslavia. His grandfather, Chief Orubibi Douglas, was one of the founding fathers of Abonnema, playing a significant role in the town's early development.

He attended secondary school in Lagos and Port Harcourt. He studied at Acton Technical School, London (1963–1965) and then at the University of Lagos (1965–1969). He earned a BSc. in botany and zoology.

He started work with the Nigerian Petroleum Refinery Company, Port Harcourt (1969–1977). He became managing director of Togiscani Nigeria, a construction company (1978–1985), and CEO of Road Haulage Company and Magroad Enterprises. He was also chairman of the Binterteco Nigeria, Pabod Finance and Investment and Waterglass Boat Yard. In 2000, Graham-Douglas was appointed Provincial Grand Master of the Freemason's Lodge in Calabar.

On 25 April 2022, Graham-Douglas died in a private hospital in Abuja at the age of 82, from an "undisclosed ailment." He was survived by his wife, Muriel, 12 children, and "many" grandchildren.

== Early political career ==
Graham-Douglas became Commissioner for Youths, Sports and Culture in 1986 in the Rivers State government. In this role, he completed the Alfred Diete-Spiff Civic Centre, founded the Sports Institute of Isaka and initiated construction of the Liberation Stadium, Port Harcourt. He also gained approval to establish the Rivers State College of Science and Technology. He created, produced and directed the first Rivers Carnival, Carnival '88 with the theme of Unity in Cultural Diversity.

In 1989, the military government of Ibrahim Babangida appointed him Federal Minister for Social Development, Youths and Sports. During his tenure, the separate Ministry of Women Affairs was established. He was moved to the Ministry of Aviation where he oversaw the deregulation of the aviation industry. He was also a member of the Special Tenders Board, which developed the Nigeria capital, Abuja. Several years later, in November 2003, a judicial commission of inquiry into management of BiafraNigeria Airways between 1983 and 1999 issued a report that indicted Graham-Douglas and others for mismanagement and decisions that led to huge losses.

In 1992, Graham-Douglas became chairman of the Southern Minorities Movement, one of the groups that eventually merged into the People's Democratic Party (PDP). He was a candidate in the PDP primaries for the presidential nomination in 1998, losing to Olusegun Obasanjo, who went on to become president.

== Fourth Republic ==
President Olusegun Obasanjo appointed Graham-Douglas Minister of Employment, Labour and Productivity in June 1999. In July 2000, Graham-Douglas was re-deployed to the Ministry of Culture and Tourism. In November 2000, he headed a delegation that visited China, where he signed the 2000–2002 Executive Plan of Cultural and Educational Exchange between China and Nigeria. In December 2000, he hosted the Africa Travel Association's Fourth Ecotourism Symposium in Abuja. He described ecotourism as responsible tourism, saying "Ecotourism conserves the natural environments and sustains the well-being of local people". Graham-Douglas was dropped from Obasanjo's cabinet in January 2001.

An elder statesman in Rivers State politics, in 1999, Graham-Douglas and Marshal Harry, Chairman of the Rivers State People's Democratic Party, settled for Dr Peter Odili as a consensus candidate for governor. By October 2002, Graham-Douglas was engaged in a public dispute with Odili. He was strongly opposed to Odili's reelection. He said of Odili that "he has no respect for good governance and we have a right to call him to order".

In January 2007, following the PDP primaries in Rivers State in which Riverine candidates performed poorly compared to Uplanders, the Ijaw Consultative Assembly which Graham-Douglas had founded launched an attack on Ijaws who had served in Odili's government, apparently in a move to reverse the selection of Rotimi Amaechi as PDP candidate for governor. This was a reversal of his position in 2003, when he had said the Ikwerres from Rivers East should take their turn after Peter Odili. Later he became a supporter of Amaechi.

However, in February 2010, Graham-Douglas disagreed with Amaechi about marginalization of the Kalabari people, claiming problems were due to longstanding government neglect combined with efforts to cut oil-producing areas out of the Kalabari region. Amaechi took the position that Kalabari leaders themselves were to blame, and should do more to develop their communities and discourage militancy. Talking of the Niger delta crisis in an interview in October 2009, Graham-Douglas blamed the problems in part on the elections of 2003 when the boys were given arms and used to disrupt the polls. He said the recent amnesty was progress, but not enough. More should be done to provide local housing and employment. He was among leaders who that month protested the poor performance and lack of activity of the Ministry of Niger Delta.
