= Congress for National Consensus =

Defunct Nigerian political party, 1996–1998

- Abbreviation: CNC
- Founded: 1996
- Registered: 30 September 1996
- Dissolved: July 1998
- Headquarters: Nigeria

The Congress for National Consensus (CNC) was a Nigerian political party. It was one of five parties registered by the National Electoral Commission of Nigeria (NECON) in September 1996 under the transition programme of the military government of General Sani Abacha, and was dissolved in July 1998.

== History ==
Following the lifting of the ban on political activity, 16 political associations submitted completed registration applications to NECON in 1996. On 30 September 1996 the commission registered five of them: the CNC, the United Nigeria Congress Party (UNCP), the Democratic Party of Nigeria (DPN), the National Centre Party of Nigeria (NCPN) and the Grassroots Democratic Movement (GDM).

The registrations attracted criticism at the time. Commentators described the five as government-aligned formations, and the politician Bola Ige characterised them collectively as the five fingers of a leprous hand.

== Activities ==
The CNC contested the state assembly elections of December 1997 and the National Assembly elections of 25 April 1998, both conducted under the Abacha transition programme. The UNCP won the large majority of the seats at the 1998 poll.

Between 6 and 9 April 1998 the registered parties held conventions to select presidential candidates. The CNC, along with the UNCP, DPN and NCPN, adopted Abacha as its candidate; the GDM was the only party to consider alternative nominees. Following the National Assembly elections, the CNC and the three other parties that had not won substantial representation raised objections to the conduct of the poll.

Chief Chris Maduabrochukwu Okolie (1949–2007) served as the party's national publicity secretary before leaving for the UNCP.

== Dissolution ==
Abacha died on 8 June 1998. On 20 July 1998 his successor, General Abdulsalami Abubakar, announced a new transition programme, cancelled the elections held under the previous programme, and dissolved both NECON and the five registered parties. Three new parties - the People's Democratic Party, the All People's Party and the Alliance for Democracy - were registered for the elections that produced the Fourth Republic.

== See also ==
- United Nigeria Congress Party
- Grassroots Democratic Movement
- National Centre Party of Nigeria
- Sumner Dagogo-Jack
