= Michelle Bello =

Nigerian filmmaker (born 1982)

- Born: Michelle Aisha Bello; 30 September 1982 (age 44); London, United Kingdom
- Education: American University; Regent University
- Occupations: Film director entrepreneur; film producer
- Years active: 2007—Present

Michelle Bello (born Michelle Aisha Bello; 30 September 1982) is a British Nigerian film director and film producer. She is also CEO of a Nigerian-based entertainment and publishing company, Blu Star Entertainment Limited. Bello was born in London, England.

== Early life ==
The youngest of two children, Bello was born in September 1982 to Abdullahi Dominic and Sylviane Bello. Bello is of Nigerian, French, African-American and Congolese descent. She spent her early years in Lagos, Nigeria, attending nursery and primary school and at the age of eight, but left for England where she obtained both her GCSE and A-level certificate.It was while growing up in England that she discovered her passion for film making and never looked back.

== Career ==
Bello moved to the United States in 2001 to study communications (specialising in Visual Media) at the American University in Washington D.C. While there, she made several short films and during a study-abroad programme in Prague, the Czech Republic, Bello made her first 16mm short film entitled Sheltered.

After graduating from the American University in 2005, she moved back to Nigeria to pursue her dreams of becoming a film producer/director. In 2007, Bello worked with prominent TV producer and presenter Mo Abudu as an Associate Producer on her hit MNet TV show Moments with Mo. Soon after, she produced the award-winning music video Greenland for well-known artist and photographer T.Y. Bello.

Michelle produced and directed her first feature film called Small Boy in late 2007. The movie became an instant success in the US as out of 400 films, it was nominated for two awards at the American Black Film Festival in Los Angeles the following year. The nominations were the Heineken Red Star Award for 'Innovation in Film' and the Target Filmmaker Award for 'Most Inspirational Film'. On the home front, Small Boy went on to win two Africa Movie Academy Award for 'Best Art Direction' and 'Best Young Child Actor' in April 2009. The movie premiere took place in Lagos, Nigeria in May 2010. with Nollywood stars and industry practitioners in attendance.

Thereafter, Bello returned to the United States and earned a master's degree in Communications, specialising in Film Directing, at Regent University in Virginia. She took the opportunity to develop her craft and made several short films. While at Regent University, Bello was selected to do an internship with the world-renowned ICM Talent Agency at the 2011 Cannes Film Festival. She also attended the Sundance Film Festival that year as part of a class programme organised by the university and met several prominent film makers during her stay.

After her graduation in December 2011, Bello returned home to join the thriving industry known as Nollywood. Her knowledge, combined with her experiences in the industry both locally and internationally, made Bello ably equipped to produce and direct her second feature film Flower Girl, which was released in February 2013 to rave reviews. The movie hit number one in cinemas across Nigeria and was subsequently released in Ghana and had the same response. Several months later, Flower Girl was premiered in the US at the Hollywood Black Film Festival in Los Angeles in October 2013. On 4 October, it crossed over to the UK market opening in three of their biggest cinema chains including the Odeon, Vue and Cineworld cinemas. Michelle is the first female Nigerian director to have a UK theatrical release.

Flower Girl subsequently won ‘Best African Film’ in the UK at the Black International Film Festival early November 2013. The movie crossed the Atlantic once again to be screened at the Toronto Black Film Festival in February 2014. Aberdeen, Scotland, was the next stop for the film and was released in the cinema in February. It went on to win the Screen Nation Film & Television 2014 Award in the UK for ‘Favourite New Nollywood Film’ that same month. The film also received nominations for ‘Best Lighting’ at the Africa Movie Academy Awards 2013, and ‘Best Film’ at the Africa International Film Festival 2013.

Michelle received the Trailblazer Award at the recent Africa Magic Viewer’s Choice Awards 2014, held in Lagos, Nigeria. According to the judges the award recognized her commitment and demonstrated talent, her versatility and potential for cutting-edge approaches to African cinema. The award included a Hyundai sports car. Flower Girl received four AMVCA nominations including Best Film and Best Supporting Actor and went on to win Best Writer in a Comedy and Best Supporting Actress Awards. Michelle is developing her third feature film.

=== Other work ===
Under the Blu Star Entertainment Limited umbrella, Bello published The Film Directory, a publication listing numerous Nigerian filmmakers and companies in the industry. The first edition was launched in September 2007 at the Abuja Film Festival and was supported by government agencies including the Nigerian Film Corporation and National Film and Video Censors Board.

== Personal life ==
As a child at school in England, Bello's athletic abilities got her in the school netball, swimming and rounders teams. In addition to this, she also made time for the more musical side of her and learned to play the saxophone and piano.

Bello's Nigerian father, Air Vice Marshal Abdullahi Bello (rtd.), was born in Jimeta, Yola, Adamawa State, and rose through the ranks to become the youngest Chief of the Air Staff in Africa in 1980. After 25 years of meritorious service he retired from the Nigerian Air Force. Her American/French-born mother, Sylvaline, is a prominent naturalised Nigerian arts advocate, promoting performance and visual arts at home and abroad as the Chairman of a Nigerian NGO called the Masoma Africa Foundation for the Arts. From a young age, Bello's mother exposed her to musicals, shows and movies which she always found entertaining.

== Films ==
- Sheltered (2005), Director/Producer
- Small Boy (2009), Director/Producer
- Flower Girl (2013), Director/ Producer
- Immoral Dilemma (2016)- Associate Producer

== Television ==
- Moments with Mo – Season 1 (2007) Associate Producer
- Sesame Street Nigeria – Season 1 (2010) Director

== Music video ==
- Greenland (2007) Producer

== Awards and nominations ==
- Winner: Best Set Design - Nollywood Movies Awards 2014.
- Winner: Best Sound Design - Nollywood Movies Awards 2014.
- Winner: Best Soundtrack for Efya - Nollywood Movies Awards 2014.
- Winner: Best Editing - Nollywood Movies Awards 2014.
- Winner: Favourite New Nollywood Film - Screen Nation Awards 2014.
- Winner: The Trailblazer Award - Africa Magic Viewer's Choice Awards 2014.
- Winner: Best Supporting Actress - Africa Magic Viewer's Choice Awards 2014.
- Winner: Best Script (Comedy) - Africa Magic Viewer's Choice Awards 2014.
- Winner: Best African Film - Black International Film Festival U.K 2013.
- Nominated: Best Film 2013 - Africa Magic Viewer's Choice Awards 2014.
- Nominated: Best Supporting Actor - Africa Magic Viewer's Choice Awards 2014.
- Nominated: Favourite Female African International Emerging Screen Talent - Screen Nation Awards 2014.
- Nominated: Best Film - African International Film Festival 2013.
- Nominated: Best Lighting - Africa Movie Academy Awards 2013.
- Small Boy: Africa Movie Academy Awards (AMAA) – Award for Best Art Direction 2009.
- Small Boy: Africa Movie Academy Awards (AMAA) – Award for Best Young Child Actor 2009.
- Small Boy: Nomination at the American Black Film Festival in Los Angeles 2008 (the Heineken Red Star Award for Innovation in Film)
- Small Boy: Nomination at the American Black Film Festival in Los Angeles 2008 (the Target Filmmaker Award for Most Inspirational Film)
- Flower Girl: Africa Movie Academy Award (AMAA) 2013 – Nominated for Achievement In Lighting
- Flower Girl: Officially selected to be screened at the 2013 Hollywood Black Film Festival in Los Angeles on 3 October 2013

== See also ==
- List of Nigerian film producers
- Flower Girl
