= Miss Polo International 2018 =

1st Miss Polo International competition, beauty pageant edition

- Date: August 28, 2018
- Venue: Transcorp Hilton Hotel, Abuja, Nigeria
- Director: Ibife Alufohai
- Entrants: 17
- Placements: 3
- Debuts: Algeria; Austria; Brazil; Burkina Faso; Cameroon; Czech Republic; Denmark; Ghana; Finland; India; Japan; Kenya; Nigeria; Russia; Spain; Tanzania; Venezuela
- Winner: Nasneen Sheikh; India

Miss Polo International 2018 was the first Miss Polo International pageant, held at the Transcorp Hilton Hotel in Abuja, Nigeria, on August 28, 2018.

Nasneen Sheikh of India was crowned as the first ever Miss Polo International at the end of the event.

== Results ==
=== Placements ===
Placement	Contestant
Miss Polo International 2018	India – Nasneen Sheikh
1st Runner-Up	Cameroon – Foje Jencey
2nd Runner-Up	Japan – Yoho Otomo

=== Continental queens ===
Award	Name	Country
Miss Polo Europe	Galina Lukina	Russia
Miss Polo Africa	Sheila Kanini	Kenya
Miss Polo Americas	Renata Puppin	Brazil
Miss Polo Asia	Yoho Otomo	Japan

== Contestants ==
17 contestants competed for the title of Miss Polo International 2018.

- Algeria – Nassima Mechalikh
- Austria – Elina Jana Krainz
- Brazil – Renata Puppin
- Burkina Faso – Rose Armelle Nikiéma
- Cameroon – Foje Jencey
- Czech Republic – Veronika Robotkova
- Denmark – Monika Kužmová
- Ghana – Penny Yeboah
- Finland – Anna Opalko
- India – Nasneen Sheikh
- Japan – Yoho Otomo
- Kenya - Sheila Kanini
- Nigeria – Stella Whyte
- Russia – Galina Lukina
- Spain – Alexia Navarro
- Tanzania – Jackie Meela
- Venezuela – Andrea Carrillo
