= Bureau of Public Enterprises =

Government agency

The Bureau of Public Enterprises (BPE) is a government agency in Nigeria, responsible for implementing policies on privatisation and commercialisation. The Bureau was created by the Public Enterprises (Privatisation and Commercialisation) Act of 1999. The organisation's main goal is to implement the Nigerian federal government's programme of privatising public enterprises, carrying out sector reforms and liberalization of key economic sectors especially the infrastructure sector.
