= Grassroots Democratic Movement =

Political party in Nigeria

The Grassroots Democratic Movement (GDM) was a Nigerian political party that was one of the five state-sanctioned political parties allowed by the government of General Sani Abacha to participate in state assembly elections held in December 1997, and in parliamentary elections held in April 1998. The other authorized parties were the United Nigeria Congress Party, Congress for National Consensus (CNC), Democratic Party of Nigeria (DPN) and the National Centre Party of Nigeria (NCPN).

The Grassroots Democratic Movement headed by Alhaji Muhammadu Dikko Yusufu had a left wing orientation. In April 1998, the GDM was the only party considering alternative presidential candidates to Sani Abacha. Dr Tunji Braithwaite, a lawyer who was called to the bar in 1961 and founded the Nigeria Advanced Party in 1983, hoped to be the presidential aspirant for the Grassroots Democratic Movement in 1999. By May 1998, Muhammadu Dikko Yusufu, a former Nigerian police chief, was suing the GDM for nominating Abacha as its presidential candidate. He called on Abacha to resign.

When General Abdulsalami Abubakar succeeded Sani Abacha after the latter's death in June 1998, he dissolved the five parties and announced that democratic elections would be held during the first quarter of 1999. He proposed the free formation of political parties, an independent judiciary, international electoral monitors.
