= Jumeirah Zabeel Saray =

Coordinates: 25.09776°N 55.12489°E

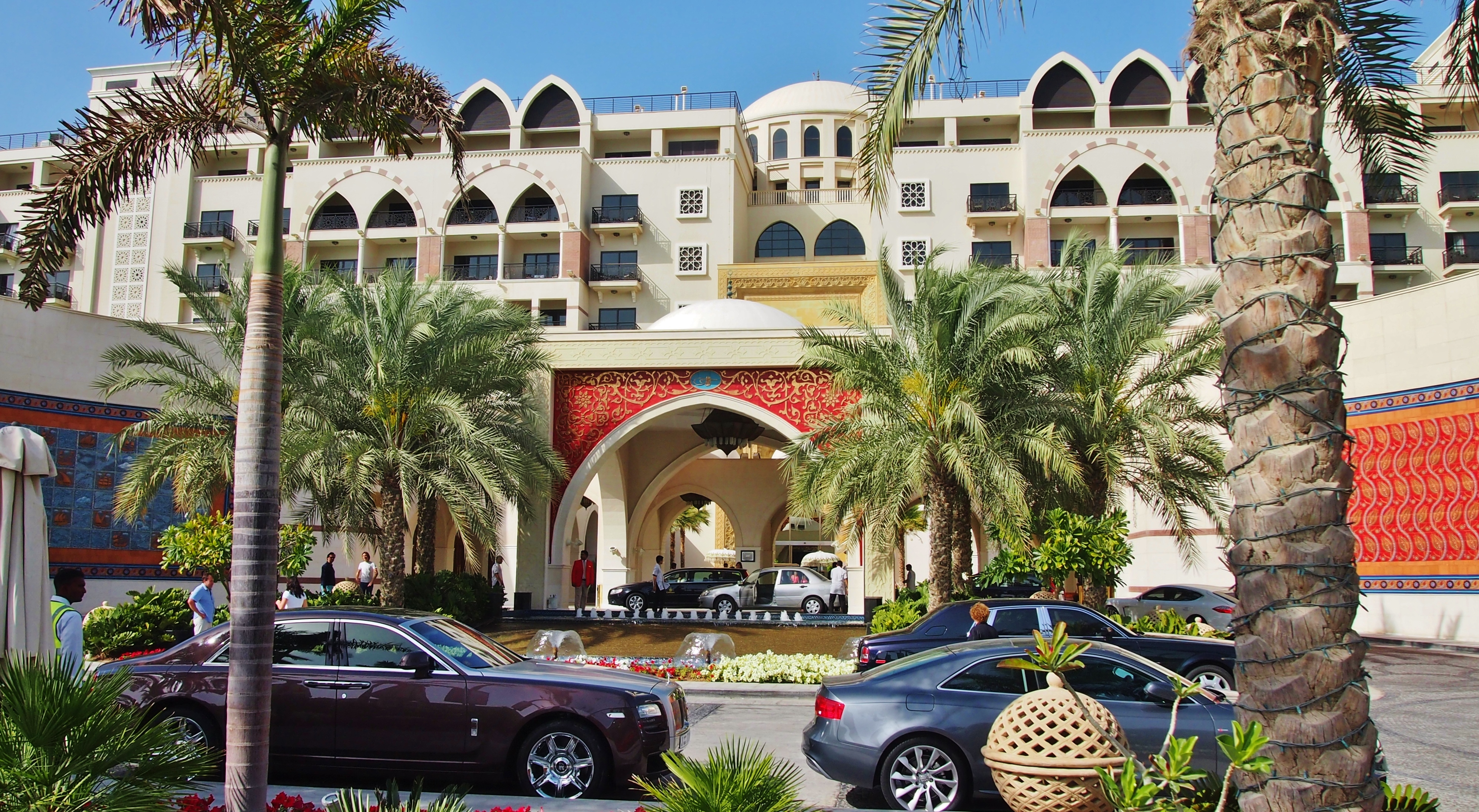
- Hotel chain: Jumeirah Group

General information
- Location: The Palm, Dubai
- Opening: 2011
- Operator: Jumeirah Group

Other information
- Number of rooms: 405
- Number of suites: Suites (Junior, Imperial, Grand Imperial)
- Number of restaurants: (8) Al Nafoorah, Amala, Tori Tori, Zenzi, Imperium, Ixir, Zenzi, Sultan's Lounge
- Number of bars: (2) ZaaBaa, Zabeel Social

Website
- Jumeirah Zabeel Saray

Jumeirah Zabeel Saray is a resort located on the west crescent of The Palm in Dubai, United Arab Emirates. It consists of the main hotel and residences, with a total of 405 rooms and numerous suites. The design of Jumeirah Zabeel Saray is influenced by Ottoman palaces which reflects the hotel's grand architectural design and luxurious features.

== Popular culture ==
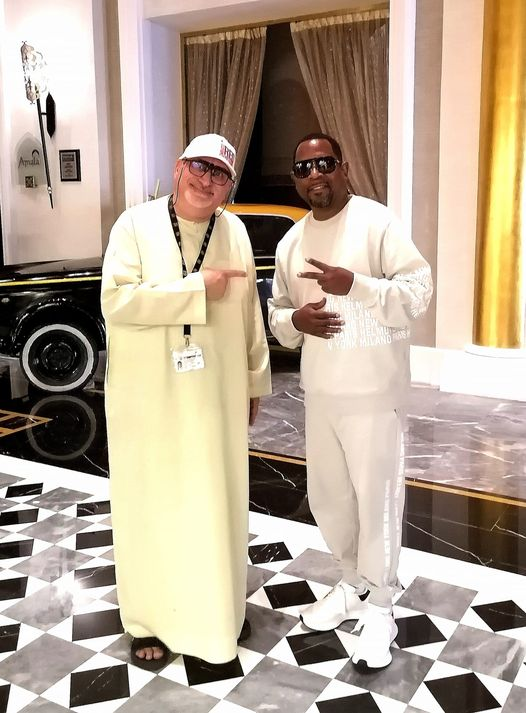
American comedian and actor Martin Fitzgerald Lawrence with the Palestinian-German zoologist and ecologist Prof. Dr. Norman Ali Khalaf at Jumeirah Zabeel Saray

The Zabeel Saray was used during the Televised Reality Singing Series X Factor was partially filmed at the hotel with Nicole Scherzinger using it to choose which male contestants joined her in the live shows in 2012.

== See also ==
- Palm Jumeirah
- Dubai World
- List of hotels in Dubai
