= United Nigeria Congress Party =

Nigerian political party

The United Nigeria Congress Party (UNCP) was a Nigerian political party. It was one of the five state-sanctioned political parties allowed by the government of General Sani Abacha to participate in state assembly elections held in December 1997, in which it won many elections, and in parliamentary elections held in April 1998. Considered by its opposition to be the army’s proxy, it dominated the Abacha transition programme.

== History ==
The UNCP was an amalgamation of three political parties, the United Nigeria Congress (UNC) led by Ibrahim Gusau, Attahiru Bafarawa, and Abdullahi Aliyu Sumaila, United Nigeria Party (UNP) led by Bode Olajumoke, Kashim Imam, Babs Akerele and Empire Kanu and the Solidarity Group of Nigeria (SGN) led by Umaru Dikko. Alhaji Ibrahim Gusau former Minister in the Second Republic was its pro tem National Chairman. In its first convention at Owerri, Ambassador Isa Aliyu Mohammed Argungu was elected as its first National Chairman. The party included politicians such as Atiku Abubakar, Abdullahi Aliyu Sumaila, Suleiman Takuma, Ibrahim Saminu Turaki, Attahiru Bafarawa, Kabiru Ibrahim Gaya, Adeleke Mamora, Funsho Williams, Mohammed Daggash, Adamu Aliero, Anyim Pius Anyim, Nnenadi Usman, Kashim Ibrahim-Imam, Ibrahim Kura Mohammed, Anyim Pius Anyim, Ibrahim Mantu, Emeka Ojukwu, Emmanuel Iwuanyanwu, Abubakar Koko, Joe Garba, Bode Olajumoke, Bello Matawalle and Ali Modu Sheriff. It was a left centrist party, with a broader base and acceptance than the left-wing Grassroots Democratic Movement (GDM) headed by Alhaji Muhammadu Dikko Yusufu. The other authorized parties were the Congress for National Consensus (CNC), Democratic Party of Nigeria (DPN) and the National Centre Party of Nigeria (NCPN). The UNCP was the largest of these political parties, and one of four (out of five) to support Abacha standing as a presidential candidate.

When General Abdulsalami Abubakar succeeded Sani Abacha after the latter's death in June 1998, he dissolved the five parties and announced that democratic elections would be held during the first quarter of 1999. He proposed the free formation of political parties, an independent judiciary, international electoral monitors.
