= Samuel Dagogo-Jack =

Nigerian-American academic

Samuel E. Dagogo-Jack
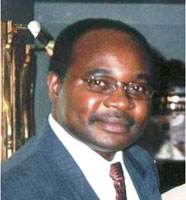
- Born: Nigeria
- Education: University of Ibadan (M.B.B.S.); University of Tennessee (D.Sc.)
- Occupations: Physician, academic
- Awards: Banting Medal for Leadership (ADA)

Samuel E. Dagogo-Jack is a Nigerian-American physician. He is the A.C. Mullins Endowed Professor in Translational Research, Professor of Medicine, and Chief of the Division of Endocrinology, Diabetes, and Metabolism at the University of Tennessee Health Science Center.

He is the director of the Postgraduate Specialist Training Program in Endocrinology, Diabetes, and Metabolism, and of the Clinical Research Unit, Clinical and Translational Research Institute at UTHSC. He was President (Medicine & Science) of the American Diabetes Association in 2015 and is a recipient of the Banting Medal for Leadership from the ADA. In 2015, he was named President, Medicine & Science, for the American Diabetes Association (ADA). He previously served as an editor of the Journal of Clinical Endocrinology & Metabolism. He is now an associate editor for the American Journal of the Medical Sciences, Experimental Biology & Medicine, and Frontiers in Endocrinology.

Dagogo-Jack earned a medical degree (MBBS) from the University of Ibadan Medical School (Nigeria), was a resident in Internal Medicine and Endocrinology at the Royal Victoria Infirmary, University of Newcastle, UK, and was certified as a member of the Royal College of Physicians. He earned research degrees of Master of Science at the University of Newcastle and a Doctor of Medicine degree at the University of Ibadan. He additionally had fellowship training in metabolism at Washington University School of Medicine and was a faculty member in the Division of Endocrinology, Diabetes and Metabolism there.

He developed the first radioimmunoassay for an epidermal growth factor (EGF) in human saliva, isolated EGF from mouse thyroid, and worked on the regulation of EGF in mice and humans. His work with Philip E. Cryer led to the discovery of the hypoglycemia-associated autonomic failure syndrome and development of methodology for reversal of hypoglycemia unawareness.

== Personal life ==
He is the elder brother of Reynolds Bekinbo Dagogo-Jack.
