= Domestic violence in Nigeria =

Abuse

Domestic violence is prominent in Nigeria as in other parts of Africa. There is a deep cultural belief in Nigeria that it is socially acceptable to hit a woman as a disciplinary measure. Cases of domestic violence remain high and show no signs of reduction in Nigeria, regardless of age, tribe, religion, or even social status. The CLEEN Foundation reports that 1 in every 3 respondents identified as a victim of domestic violence. The survey also found a nationwide increase in domestic violence in the past 3 years from 21% in 2011 to 30% in 2013. A CLEEN Foundation's 2012 National Crime and Safety Survey demonstrated that 31% of the national sample confessed to being victims of domestic violence.

Domestic violence takes many forms including physical, sexual, emotional, and mental. Traditionally, domestic violence is committed against females. Common forms of violence against women in Nigeria are rape, acid attacks, molestation, wife beating, and corporal punishment.

The Nigerian government has taken legal proceedings to prosecute men who abuse women in several states. There is currently a push in Nigeria for federal laws concerning domestic violence and for a stronger national response and support for domestic violence issues.

Incidents of domestic violence in Nigeria include battery, beatings, torture, acid baths, rape, and consequently, death. It is, however, estimated that approximately one in every three women suffers domestic violence and Intimate Partner Violence from the hands of those who claim to love and supposedly, protect them. The menace is eating deep as most of the victims do not speak out about violations of their rights, a result of nonchalance, insensitivity, and negative response from their immediate family and society at large.

On the 27th of February, 2021, The Guardian, Nigeria, recorded in their Saturday edition that cases of domestic violence, especially the physical aspect of it, remain high. They reported that at least once a week, there's a case of a man beating, maiming or killing his wife, and in some very rare cases, a woman dealing with her husband in the same manner.

== Physical violence ==
In Nigeria, women would usually face physical violence at the hands of their loved ones, family members, and the society. The most common forms of this violence include rape, murder, slapping, and kicking. Some possible reasons given for this assaults include drunk state of spouses, financial issues resulting in cases of possible frustration, and the rejection of sexual advances from the partner.

Relationship inequality is also a strong indicator of physical violence. High levels of wife beating occur when the woman is making more money than her husband or partner. This has been attributed to the lack of control the male partner feels within the relationship.

Women also often link the perpetration of physical violence with husbands who are very controlling. Women who justify wife beating are more likely to be victims of physical violence.

Another form of violence which has received a lot of recent attention in Nigeria is acid baths. Acid baths are actions of violence where the perpetrator throws acid onto his or her victim's body, resulting in disfigurement and possible loss of eyesight. Acid baths are a large issue for women that needs to be addressed. In 1990, a former beauty queen rejected her boyfriend's attempts to rekindle their relationship. In retaliation, he threw acid in her face with the words "let me see how any man will love you now".

== Sexual violence ==
Sexual violence in Nigeria largely goes unreported because of the burden of proof necessary for conviction as well as the social stigma it brings. Nigerian police has not been seen to arrest for sexual assault resulting in less reporting of the act.

About 25% of women reported forced sex at the hands of either their current partner or a former partner.

Furthermore, the 2008 Demographic and Health Survey showed that over 30.5% of married women have experienced at least one or more forms of physical, emotional or sexual violence in their marriage. Most girls or women in Nigeria have experienced sexual assault, either through domestic violence or other forms. Many of the young girls(teenagers) that are going to school or to university have been sexually harassed, either by their lecturers in the tertiary level or in the secondary level. Girls at the age of 16 and above have immediately become a mother which makes them give up their education. Boys also have experienced sexual assault at early ages. Many of them have been assaulted by their aunt, teacher, neighbours or Nani's. Rape is now paramount in every community, and currently there is no solution to it.

== Influencing factors ==
The social context of violence in Nigeria is based largely on its patriarchal society. Violence against a wife is seen as a tool that a husband uses to chastise his wife and to "improve" her. The common loss of women's rights upon marriage in Sub-Saharan Africa and the implicit obedience and deference towards men is socially encouraged within their society.

Where a bride price is paid, it is common for the husband to believe that by paying the bride price, he now owns his wife. The act of marriage is seen to give the husband full ownership of the woman. She surrenders her right to her body to him as well as her agency.

Other factors linked with domestic violence are lower socioeconomic classes, substance abuse, couple age disparity, and unemployment.

Another cause of domestic violence is infertility. When looking at a study taken by infertile woman visiting a fertility clinic, many women reported some form of domestic violence- whether physical, mental, or emotional. There were also trends showing that the Yoruba tribe women were more likely to experience violence in this case.

== Perceptions ==
The perceptions of domestic violence vary based on region, religion, and class. For example, the Tiv view wife beating as a "sign of love" is widely encouraged considering the statement, "If you are not yet beaten by your husband then you do not know the joy of marriage and that means you are not yet married".

All the major ethnic groups in Nigeria- Yoruba, Igbo, and Hausa- have strong patriarchial societal structures that lead to the justification of domestic violence. However, the Hausa are more supportive of domestic violence and view it as an inherent right of a husband.

There are differences in the perceptions of domestic violence varying across reasons. There are higher numbers for instances like neglecting the children or going out without telling the husband and less for refusal of sex or a mere argument. Many of the reasons that are viewed as acceptable for domestic violence are largely subjective to a husband's interpretation. For example, common acceptable beatings among men are lack of respect for husband, stubbornness, imposition of will on husband, and failure of wifely duties.

The 2008 NDHS did a study to view the acceptability of wife beating in Nigeria. They put forward five scenarios and asked both men and women. With women, there were trends found in viewing wife beating as more acceptable. It was viewed as more acceptable in rural areas, among married versus unmarried women, uneducated women, and poor women. The reason most viewed as justified for beating was going out without telling the husband. The relationships were about the same for men.

== Responses ==
Women experiencing domestic violence have varying responses and differences in who they report their abuses to. In a study done in Ilorin, Nigeria, a large number of women reported their abuse to family and friends while not many decided to go to the police to file a report. The rationale behind not going to the police is various such as the fear of victim-blaming, acceptance of violence as proper reaction, and the lack of police action.

One major issue facing the domestic violence issues in Nigeria is the tendency for low reported rates. A study looking at domestic violence in southwest Nigeria found that only 18.6% reported experienced or acted violence between themselves and their spouse. However, the same study also shows that 60% of the respondents claimed to have witnessed violence between a separate couple. These statistics show that there may be a tendency for underreporting which can occur for various reasons.

One main reason for the high levels of under-reporting is that it is seen as a taboo to involve the police in family matters. They view the separation of the two as important and the police force ascribes to this notion as well. Police hesitate to intervene even with lodged complaints unless the abuse goes over the customary amount usually seen in the region.

== Experience of pregnant women ==
Pregnant women experience high levels of domestic violence in Nigeria. They are subject to violence not only from their spouses, but also from their in-laws. In a study, they found that the most common type of domestic violence was to be physically assaulted and forced sexual intercourse.

A study in the nation's capital, Abuja, carried out over a course of 3 months in 2005 showed physical, sexual, and psychological abuse among pregnant women. One third of the female respondents reported experiencing domestic violence. They found psychological abuse to be the highest type of abuse followed by physical and then sexual. Women who experienced psychological abuse also experienced physical abuse. In terms of the physical abuse, about 20% of the women required medical treatment due to the abuse and the most frequent medical complication reported was premature labor. A big issue across many African countries, not just Nigeria, is the poor reproductive health systems women are provided with. Most of the women in need are women who have been exposed to sexual violence and rape, yet the country is not able to provide them with the aid they need.

Overall, the trends of domestic violence against pregnant women permeate across different ethnic groups and Nigerian states. The trends are consistent with other parts of Africa and the attitudes towards violence against pregnant women are in conjunction with the aforementioned trend viewing domestic violence as permissible under certain circumstances.

== Experience of HIV infected women ==
In Nigeria, there is a correlation between being infected with HIV and domestic violence. Women who are diagnosed with HIV are at high risk for intimate partner violence. With HIV, there is also a tendency to stay in abusive relationships.

In a study 429 of 652 HIV positive pregnant women in Lagos reported being victims of violence. Of those reporting violence, 74% of the respondents said the abuse occurred after the disclosure of her HIV status. Women reported verbal abuse, threat of physical violence, and sexual deprivation once they disclosed her HIV positive status. Psychological abuse was the most commonly reported version of received violence.

Predictors of violence were women's age, marital status, disclosure and partner's educational status. The highest levels of IPV among the HIV infected were found in the age group 25–33 years old. Among the husbands, the highest levels came from those with an educational attainment of secondary school. More of than not, they were in a polygamous marriage.

Women who are victims of domestic violence are also at a higher risk of contracting HIV through various mechanisms. It becomes more difficult for them to adopt safe sex practices especially in the case of sexual abuse and forced sexual acts. The trauma of the domestic violence also ends up impacting later sexual behaviors.

== Laws ==
While domestic violence is a violation of fundamental human rights, which the Nigerian Constitution is against, there are still provisions that make it legal to engage in domestic violence against women. The provision of the Penal Code applicable in the Northern part of Nigeria specifically encourages violence against women. Underneath its provisions, the beating of a wife for the purpose of correction is legal by use of (Section 55 (1) (d) of the Penal Code).

Nigeria ratified the convention for the Elimination of Discrimination against Women in 1985 but international treaties can only go into effect when Parliament has put in a corresponding domestic law thereby limiting the international treaty to disuse.

Rape is criminalized and under the law, the sentence can range from 10 years to life imprisonment. There are also fines of about 1,280 dollars.

Amnesty International criticized Nigeria's judicial system due to its conviction rate of 10 percent of rape prosecutions.

In an attempt to battle the issue of police discretion and inactivity, Lagos (Largest city in Nigeria), held a two-day sensitization workshop on Domestic Violence law as it applies in the state.

In May 2013, Nigeria's National Assembly passed a bill to reduce gender-based violence, which is awaiting Senate approval before it becomes law. The Violence against Persons Bill gave harsher punishments for sexual violence and also provided support and measures such as restraining order to prevent the continuation of abuse.

When cases do make it to court, they are usually stagnant. In 2010, the traditional king of Akure physically and bloodily assaulted one of his wives resulting in her death. At the urging of the public, the police made a statement that they would press charges. The case was dismissed in 2012.

== Organizations ==
Nigeria has some non profit organizations and non governmental organizations that attempt to provide support for victims of domestic violence.

The Women and Child Watch Initiative is a nonprofit providing support to women and children who are victims of domestic trials such as violence and forced marriages. They also organize training programs for female lawyers to defend women's rights in domestic violence in court. The "Unite to End Violence against Women" campaign was initiated alongside the declaration of "16 days of activism against violence against women". This campaign was especially important in Nigeria when calling attention to the issue of brutality against women In 1985, Nigeria validated the Convention on the Elimination of All Forms of Discrimination against Women, otherwise known as the CEDAW. The organization works with the sole purpose of abolishing discrimination against women.

Organization	Focus		
Project Alert on Violence Against Women	Example		
Center for the Protection of the Abused	Example		
Women Action Organization	Example		
Women Justice Program	Example		
Women's Centre for Peace and Development	Example	Domestic Violence Ng	Example
Women's Rights Advancement and Protection Alternative	Example		

== COVID-19 and Its impact on Domestic Violence ==
The COVID-19 period saw Nigeria, and every other part of the world, experiencing an undesirable lockdown. It has been documented that incidences such as domestic violence became worse in situations similar to that experienced during the lockdown, which are often a consequence of the social, economic, and financial distress experienced during the such period. The earnings of most Nigerians, especially those working in the informal sector, plummeted due to the enforcement of the strict lockdown measure. These issues, coupled with the government's inefficient distribution of palliatives, contributed to the decline in the socio-economic status of families.

The financial difficulty associated with the lockdown was reported to trigger stress, frustration, and as a result, negative coping mechanisms such as substance abuse were adopted by the men. "This Financial distress was found to have resulted in the occurrence of spousal abuse in major cities in Nigeria such as Lagos, which was the epicenter of the pandemic; and Abuja, the federal capital" This increase in Domestic Violence was not just recorded in Nigeria, It was equally experienced in the United States, China, and some European countries. In China, Hubei province recorded a threefold increase in Intimate Personal Violence (IPV).

== See also ==
- Women in Nigeria
- Crime in Nigeria
