= Akuku-Toru =

Akuku-Toru Akulga
- LGA
- Interactive map of Akuku-Toru
- Location within Nigeria Location within Africa
- Coordinates: 4°42′N 6°48′E
- Country: Nigeria
- State: Rivers State
- Date created: 1990
- Seat: Abonnema

Government
  - Local Government Chairman: Rowland Sekibo (PDP)
  - Deputy Local Government Chairman: Caroline West (PDP)
  - Local Government Council: Ward 1: Emmanuel Anabraba (PDP); Ward 2: Da-Omonaa Sunday (PDP); Ward 3: Samuel Reginald Sokari (PDP); Ward4: Sibo-Ofori Lawrence (PDP); Ward 5: Henry David Bestman (PDP); Ward 6: Otonye Dickson Briggs (PDP); Ward 7: Sundayba West Asatty (PDP); Ward 8: Tonye Briggs (PDP); Ward 9: Joseph Fyneface (PDP); Ward 10: Inemary Jack (PDP); Ward 11: Clinton Timi Clinton (PDP); Ward 12: Dedeba Briggs (PDP); Ward 13: Omonaa Oliver (PDP); Ward 14: Chidinma Everett (PDP); Ward 15: Nelson Whoknows (PDP); Ward 16: Victor Sam (PDP); Ward 17: Obibisom Bray (PDP)

Area
  - Total: 4,350 km^{2} (1,680 sq mi)
  - Land: 1,443 km^{2} (557 sq mi)

Population (2006)
  - Total: 156,006
  - Density: 108.1/km^{2} (280.0/sq mi)
- Time zone: UTC+1 (WAT)
- postal code: 504

Akuku-Toru is a Local Government Area in Rivers State, Nigeria. Its headquarters are in the town of Abonnema.

It has an area of 1,443 km^{2} and a population of 156,006 at the 2006 census.

== Climate/Geography ==
The entire area of Akuku Toru Local Government Area is 4,350 km^{2} (1,680 sq mi), of which more than 65% is submerged under water. The average temperature of the area is 25 °C (77 °F), and the humidity is 90%. There are two distinct seasons in the Akuku Toru local government area: the rainy season, which is marked by frequent and intense rainfall, and the dry season.

== Wards ==
- Alise Group
- Briggs I
- Briggs II
- Briggs III
- Georgewill I
- Georgewill II
- Georgewill III
- Jack I
- Jack II
- Jack III
- Kula I
- Kula II
- Manuel I
- Manuel II
- Manuel III
- North/South Group
- Obonoma
