= Mohammed Shitta-Bey =

Nigerian Muslim businessman

Chief Mohammed Shitta-Bey
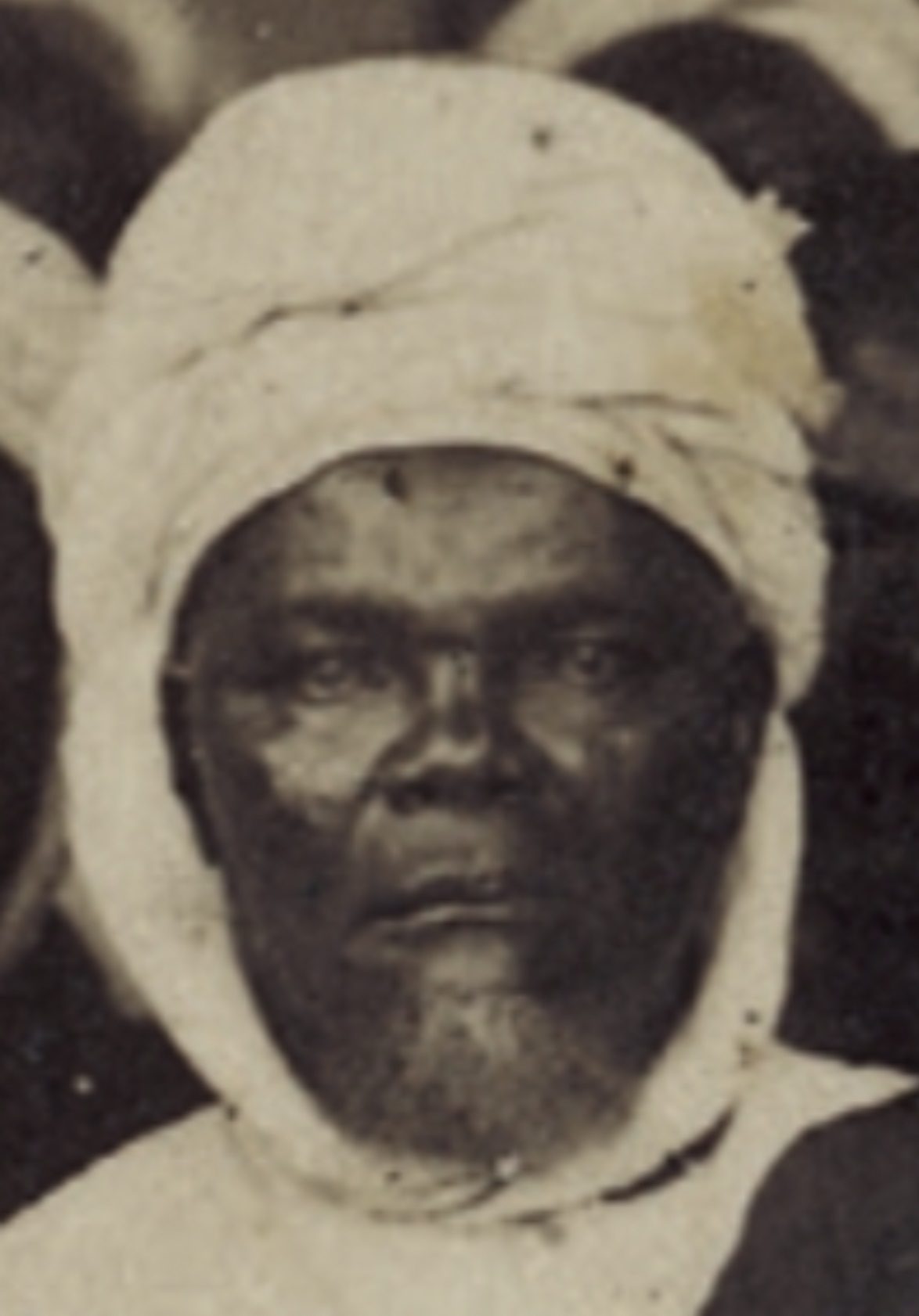
- Mohammed Shitta Bey in 1894
- Born: Mohammed Shitta; Waterloo, Sierra Leone
- Monuments: Shitta-Bey Mosque
- Other name: William
- Title: Seriki Musulumi of Lagos, Baba Adinni of Lagos, Bey of the Ottoman Empire
- Term: 1873-1895

Chief Mohammed Shitta-Bey (19 December 1824 – 4 July 1895), alias Olowo Pupa, was the first titled Seriki Musulumi (a Nigerian chieftain) of Lagos and second Baba Adinni of Lagos. He was a prominent Muslim businessman, aristocrat and philanthropist who was involved in commerce across Lagos and the Niger-Delta region. He was also a patron of the first internationally recognised mosque in present-day Nigeria; the Shitta-Bey Mosque in Lagos, and served as a leader in the Lagos Muslim community until his death. He is known to be one of the founding fathers of legitimate commerce in precolonial Nigeria; as at the time of his death he was the most prominent and wealthiest Muslim trader in West Africa.

== Early life ==
Shitta (Note: Bey is an honorary title given later in life, thus not used here until appropriate) was born in the liberated African village of Waterloo, Sierra Leone, to Salu and Aishat Shitta; Okus of recaptive Yoruba origin who were rescued by the British West Africa Squadron from the Atlantic Slave Trade and were a part of the Oku Mohammedan community in Sierra Leone. Shitta's parents moved from Waterloo to Fourah Bay around 1831, where his father became Imam of the Fourah Bay Muslim community. Shitta's birth name was Mohammed Shitta; he was also known as William Shitta. Although Shitta was baptized as a child by CMS missionaries in Freetown, he reverted to his father's Muslim faith when the Shitta family emigrated to Badagry in 1844. Through his paternal lineage, Shitta was a direct descendant of Alaafin Abiodun.

Before the occurrence of the transatlantic slave trade and eventual settlement in Sierra Leone; through his paternal line; Shitta’s family were of Oyo (Yoruba) stock. His grandfather, Amidu, who was a grandson of Alaafin Abiodun of Oyo, fled Oyo-Ile about the year 1797, at a time of general massacre of muslims in the metropolis. Amidu settled at Iseyin, already a centre of Islam, with his three sons, Sumonu, Asani and Salu (who later begat Mohammed Shitta Bey).

Sumonu later proceeded to Ilorin then a growing hotbed of Islamism. The murder of Afonja by his Fulani allies in 1827 triggered off a general reaction against muslims in several parts of Yorubaland, causing many to flee to Ilorin in an attempt to seek refuge. The two brothers of Sumonu in Ilorin were captured and taken to Sierra Leone. Salu regained his freedom later and settled at the village of Waterloo.

== Business career and influence in colonial Lagos ==
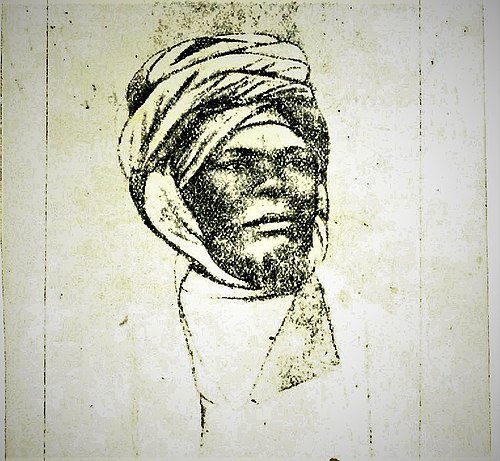
Portrait of Mohammed Shitta-Bey (2002)

In 1852, a crisis in Badagry between Akitoye and Kosoko forced Shitta's family to move to Lagos. He became an agent to the firms of Pinnock B & Co and Messrs Miller & co. Shitta acquired a tract of land in Egga, a town along the Niger, where he situated a factory. By 1881, he had acquired a steamer for conveying goods from the Niger to the coast. He accumulated significant wealth trading such goods as palm oil, ivory, kola nuts, egusi, gum copal, hides and clothes, and built a pious reputation. Shitta also expanded his business activities to Sierra Leone.

Shitta's influence also rose as he was friendly with Obas Dosunmu and Oyekan I. He served as an adviser to Oba Oyekan I, and financed Oyekan's candidacy for the Lagos throne until the colonial government approved Oyekan's succession of Dosunmu. As evidence of his political clout, acting colonial Governor Denton identified Shitta as a powerful force resisting the supervision of Muslim schools under the British Board of Education. Subsequently, Shitta acquiesced in his opposition to Western education and joined other members in the Muslim community to promote the idea of a Muslim School teaching modern subjects. Shitta also earned the nickname "Olowo Pupa" (or red money) because of his famous gold cowrie coins.

=== Political Influence and Diplomacy ===
Shitta Bey’s political influence extended beyond the Lagos Colony, as he frequently served as a diplomatic intermediary during regional conflicts. During the Kiriji War, the leadership of Ibadan recognized his status as a key member of the Lagosian elite. In a correspondence from Aare Latoosa of Ibadan and the Chiefs of Ibadan appealed directly to Shitta and other prominent "Lagos Oyos" to investigate reports of the British government supplying superior Martini-Henry rifles to their adversaries. The Ibadan leadership expressed their trust in Shitta's neutrality, urging him to "act the part of a peace-maker" to resolve the hostilities. This is of great significance, as Aare Latoosa of Ibadan was the ruler of the last Yoruba empire ever (Ibadan Republic) and was also as the helm of the longest Yoruba war.

=== Kola nut farming ===
Due to language advantages, the Saro (Shitta's community) emerged as a dominant commercial group in Lagos. Having developed a migratory forte, they had an edge as travellers who were able to go into the interiors to meet directly with various commodity producers and traders. They were the pioneer southern Nigerian traders in kola, a cash crop that later emerged as a viable and important export commodity for the western region in the early twentieth century.

The Saro introduced the crop which was bought from Hausa traders across the River Niger into southern Nigerian agriculture. The first kola farm and the dominant trading firm in kola were both orchestrated by Saros.

== Montaigac and Cyprien Fabre and Company v. Shitta, July 17th 1890 ==
Mohamed Shitta, a prominent Nigerian merchant of the late 19th century, was renowned for his immense wealth, generosity, and financial acumen. His business empire extended into diverse ventures, including the operation of factories and expansive trading networks. The scale of his personal fortune and the respect he commanded were highlighted in the landmark case of Montaiganc and Cyprien Fabre & Co. v. Shitta (1890), which underscored his role as a financier and influential figure in the economic landscape of Lagos Colony.

The case arose from a series of loans amounting to £6,000 (equivalent to approximately £850,000 to £1 million in 2024) advanced by Shitta to Giuseppe Del Grande, an agent acting on behalf of Cyprien Fabre & Co., a French trading firm with significant interests on the West African coast. Remarkably, Shitta provided these funds without requiring interest for several years, a testament to his vast resources and benevolent character. His willingness to extend such a large sum on such favorable terms underscored his financial independence and the trust he placed in his business relationships.

The Privy Council ultimately deliberated on whether Cyprien Fabre & Co. could be held liable for the debt incurred by Del Grande, who had operated under the wide-ranging powers granted by the company. The loan, delivered in multiple installments between 1884 and 1885, reflected Shitta’s central role in facilitating commerce in Lagos. The court’s examination of the case not only illustrated the legal complexities of agency and commercial partnerships in colonial trade but also highlighted Shitta’s pivotal position in the region’s economic networks.

Shitta’s involvement in this high-profile litigation underscores his unparalleled financial capacity and his reputation as a generous and trustworthy financier. His ability to extend such significant sums without immediate financial returns demonstrated both the scale of his wealth and his integrity, marking him as one of the foremost figures in the economic and social history of 19th-century West Africa.

== Religion and philanthropy ==
Shitta was also a philanthropist who donated funds for the growth of Islam in Lagos and Sierra Leone, financing the construction of mosques in both places including the Jamiul Salaam mosque in Foulah town. He was a major donor for the construction of the Lagos Central Mosque in 1873 and held the chieftaincy title of the Seriki Musulumi of Lagos, thus making him the leader of the Muslims of Lagos.

=== Construction of the Shitta-Bey Mosque ===
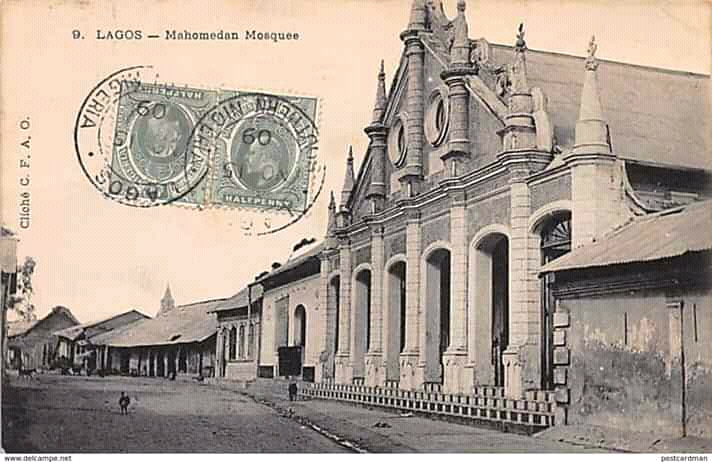
Shitta-Bey Mosque. Circa: 1902

Mohammed Shitta financed the construction of the landmark Shitta-Bey Mosque in 1891 at costs reported by various authors to be between £3000 and £7000. The mosque featured Afro-Brazilian themed architecture created by Señor Joao Baptista Da Costa, a Brazilian returnee to Lagos who was assisted by an indigenous builder named Sanusi Aka. Senor Da Costa also designed the Taiwo Olowo Monument in Lagos.

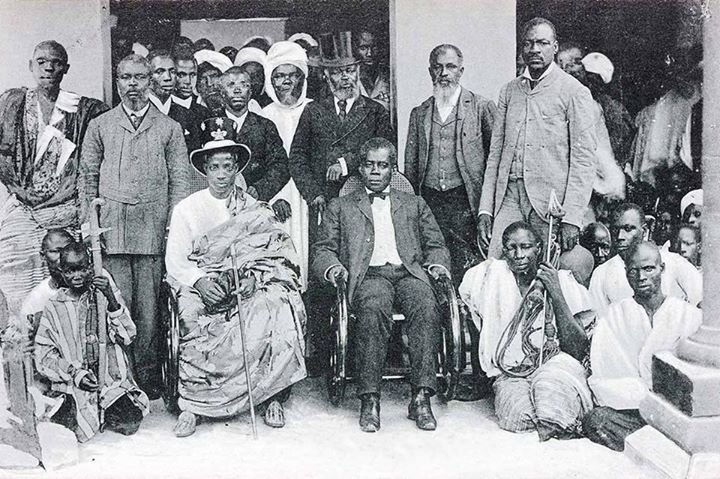
Opening of Shitta-Bey Mosque

The Shitta-Bey Mosque launched on 4 July 1894, at a ceremony presided over by the Governor of Lagos, Sir Gilbert Carter. Others in attendance included Oba Oyekan I, Edward Wilmot Blyden, Abdullah Quilliam (who represented Sultan Abdul Hamid II of the Ottoman Empire), and prominent Lagosian Christians such as James Pinson Labulo Davies, John Otunba Payne, and Richard Beale Blaize. Quilliam brought a letter accredited to the Sultan of Turkey asking Lagos Muslims to embrace Western education.

=== "Bey" title ===
At the Shitta-Bey Mosque launch that Shitta was honoured with the "Bey" title, the Ottoman Order of Medjidie 3rd class (the highest class for a civilian) by Sultan Abdul Hamid II. Thereafter, Mohammed Shitta became known by the compound name Shitta-Bey.

== 1894 Lagos Muslim Petition ==
The Lagos Muslim Petition In 1894, Mohammed Shitta-Bey played a prominent role in organizing a petition submitted by the Lagos Muslim community to the British colonial administration. The petition sought official recognition of Muslim personal law, particularly in matters of marriage, divorce, and inheritance, within the colonial legal framework. It also advocated for the establishment of Muslim schools and the protection of Islamic religious practices under colonial governance. The document, signed by leading Muslim figures in Lagos, reflected broader concerns about religious representation and legal autonomy amidst expanding British influence. Though the petition did not immediately result in legislative change, it marked an early and significant instance of Muslim political engagement in colonial Nigeria.

Other signatories were Al’Imam Ibrahim, Ahmad Tijani & Othman Animashawun.

These individuals, alongside Mohammed Shitta-Bey, were key figures in the Lagos Muslim community who advocated for the recognition of Islamic legal practices. Additionally, Yusuf Shitta, Mohammed Shitta-Bey's brother, is noted in related correspondence, particularly in a letter requesting the Ottoman Caliph to honor Shitta-Bey for his contributions to the mosque, which suggests his involvement in community efforts around the same period, though not explicitly confirmed as a signatory of the petition itself.

== Death ==
Mohammed Shitta-Bey died of influenza in Lagos on 4 July 1895, exactly one year after the launch of the Shitta-Bey Mosque. At the time of his death, in combination with his brother - Yusuf’s sons; there were 23 first generation Shitta-Bey male lines.

== Sources ==
- Oyeweso, Siyan (2001). Across Three Centuries: The Life and Legacies of Muhammed Shitta Bey (1824 - 1895). Lagos: Free Enterprises.
- Oyeweso, Siyan (1999). Eminent Yoruba Muslims of the 19th and early 20th centuries. Ibadan: Charles publication.
- Cole, Gibril (2013). The Krio of West Africa : Islam, culture, creolization, and colonialism in the nineteenth century. Athens: Ohio University Press.
- Ostien, Philip; Makinde, Kola (2012). "Legal Pluralism in Colonial Lagos: The 1894 Petition of the Lagos Muslims to Their British Colonial Masters". Die Welt des Islams. 52 (1): 51–68. doi:10.1163/157006012X627904.
- Falola, Toyin (2024). A History of West Africa. New York: Routledge.
- Forrest, Tom (1994). The Advance of African Capital: The Growth of Nigerian Private Enterprise. Virginia: University Press of Virginia.
