= Akin Osuntokun =

Nigerian political strategist (born 1961)

Obi-Datti 2023 Presidential Campaign Council Director-General
- Incumbent
- Assumed office 27 December 2022
- Preceded by: Doyin Okupe

Managing Director, News Agency of Nigeria
- In office 2011–2015
- Succeeded by: Bayo Onanuga

Political Adviser to President Olusegun Obasanjo
- In office 1999–2007

Personal details
- Born: 24 November 1961 (age 64) Okemesi, Ekiti, Nigeria
- Education: University of Lagos
- Occupation: Political strategist

Akin Osuntokun (born 24 November 1961) is a Nigerian political scientist, strategist, researcher, administrator, journalist and writer. Osuntokun was appointed as a political adviser to President Olusegun Obasanjo between 1999 and 2007.

In 2011, Osuntokun became the Director of the Presidential Campaign of the People's Democratic Party in the 2011 general elections. On 27 December 2022, he was announced by the Nigerian Labour Party as the Director General of the Obi-Datti Presidential Campaign Council, to lead the 2023 presidential election campaign of a former governor of Anambra State, Mr Peter Obi after the resignation of Doyin Okupe.

Osuntokun has served as chairman of Odua Printing and publishing corporation, News Agency of Nigeria, sat on the board of several public corporations and also contributes to newspaper columns. Osuntokun is the current Balogun of Okemesi - which translates to the war commander of Okemesi Ekiti where he hails from. This title was once held by Fabunmi of Okemesi.

In July 2021, Balogun Akin Osuntokun was named by the Ooni of Ife, Adeyeye Enitan Ogunwusi as the chairman of the Ooni caucus alongside 27 other members. Osuntokun is a fellow of the Nigerian Academy of Letters, FNAL. He is a fellow of the Nigerian Institute of International Affairs, FNIIA. He was an academic visiting fellow at the school of global and area studies, University of Oxford, from 2019 to 2020.
