= Shitta-Bey Mosque =

Mosque in Lagos, Nigeria

Coordinates: 6.45773°N 3.38656°E

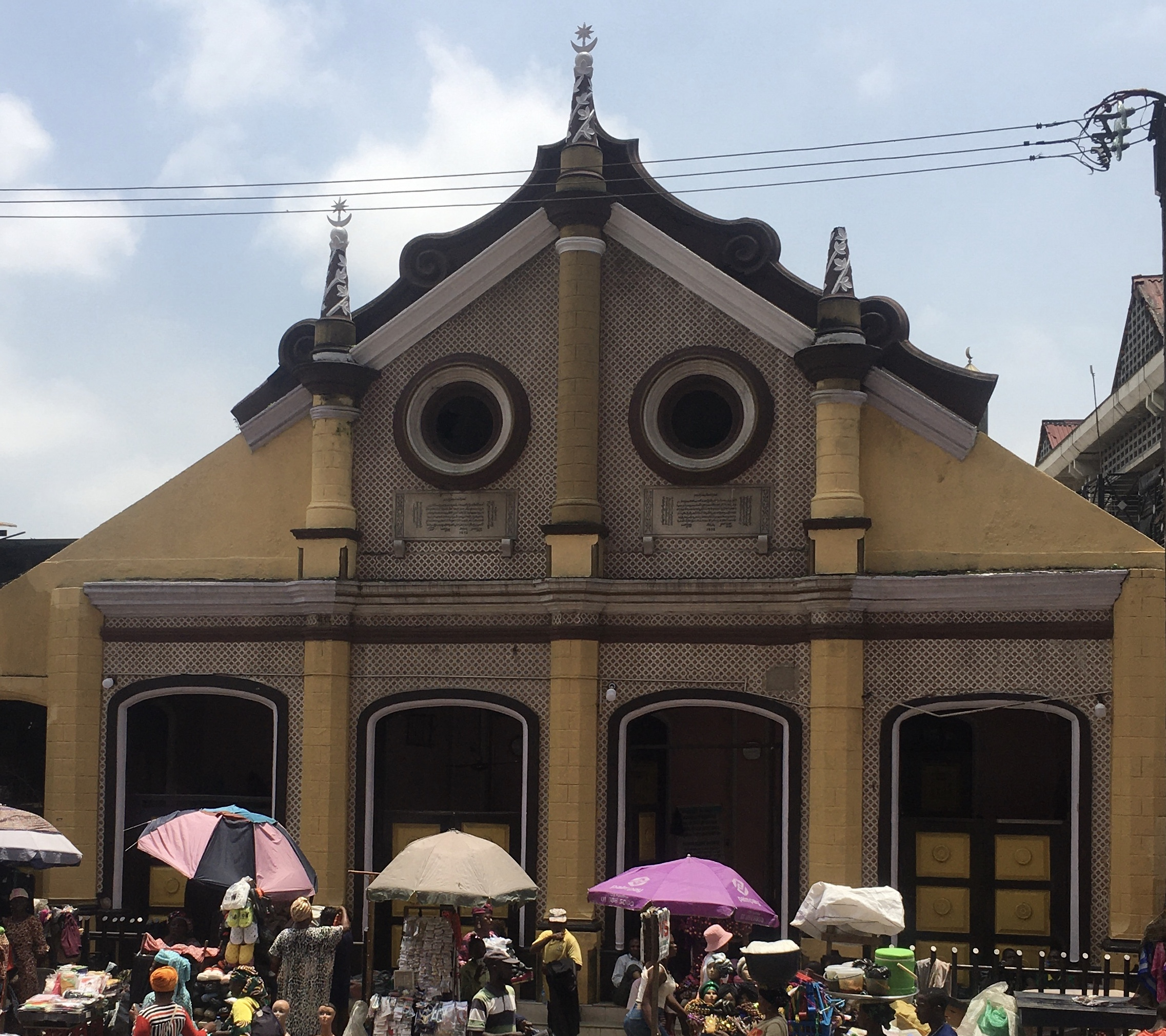

Religion
- Affiliation: Islam
- Status: Active

Location
- Location: Lagos Island, Lagos
- Country: Nigeria
- Interactive map of Shitta-Bey Mosque

Architecture
- Architect: João Baptista da Costa
- Type: Mosque
- Style: Afro-Brazilian Architecture
- Founder: Mohammed Shitta Bey
- Established: July 4, 1894
- Groundbreaking: 1881
- Completed: February 7, 1892; 134 years ago
- Construction cost: £3000

Specifications
- Capacity: 200
- Minaret: 1
- Materials: concrete, granite and marble
- Designated as NHL: National Monument
- Some sources reported £5,000 and £7000.

Shitta-Bey Mosque is a mosque, religious learning centre and one of the oldest mosques in Southern Nigeria and the first internationally recognised mosque in Nigeria. The mosque is located at Martins Ereko Street, Lagos Island, Lagos, Nigeria. It was established in 1892 and designated as National monument by Nigerian Commission for Museums and Monuments in 2013. The mosque, considered one of the most important historical legacies of Nigeria, Shitta-Bey Mosque was named after its founder Sierra Leonean-born Nigerian, Mohammed Shitta Bey, who was an aristocrat, philanthropist and businessman.

== History ==
The construction of the mosque started in 1891 and was financed by Mohammed Shitta Bey, a businessman and philanthropist, son of Sierra Leone-born parents of Yoruba descent. A Brazilian architect João Baptista da Costa oversaw the construction which was done with tile-work depicting the Afro-Brazilian architecture. The Shitta-Bey Mosque launched on July 4, 1894, at a ceremony presided over by Governor of Lagos, Sir Gilbert Carter. Others in attendance included Oba Oyekan I, Edward Wilmot Blyden, Abdullah Quilliam (who represented Sultan Abdul Hamid II of the Ottoman Empire), and prominent Lagosian Christians such as James Pinson Labulo Davies, John Otunba Payne, and Richard Beale Blaize as well as foreign representatives. Quilliam brought a letter accredited to the Sultan of Turkey asking Lagos Muslims to embrace Western education.

It was at the launch that Mohammed Shitta was honored with the "Bey" title, the Ottoman Order of Medjidie 3rd class (the highest class for a civilian) by Sultan Abdul Hamid II. Thereafter, Mohammed Shitta became known by the compounded name Shitta-Bey.

== Gallery of Shitta-Bey Mosque ==
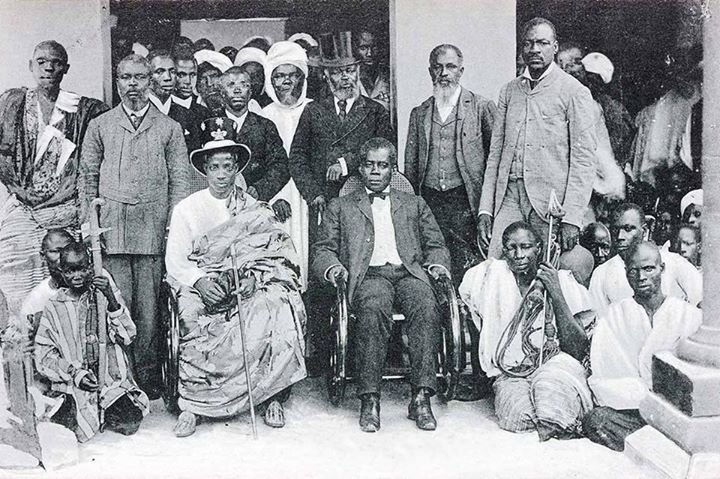
Mohammed Shitta Bey at the opening of Shitta-Bey Mosque (dressed in white, standing left of centre at the back)

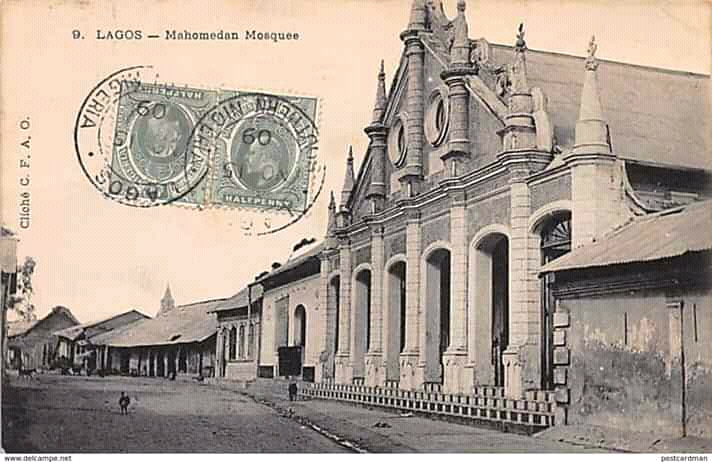
Shitta-Bey Mosque on a postcard c. 1902

Shitta-Bey Mosque in 1962

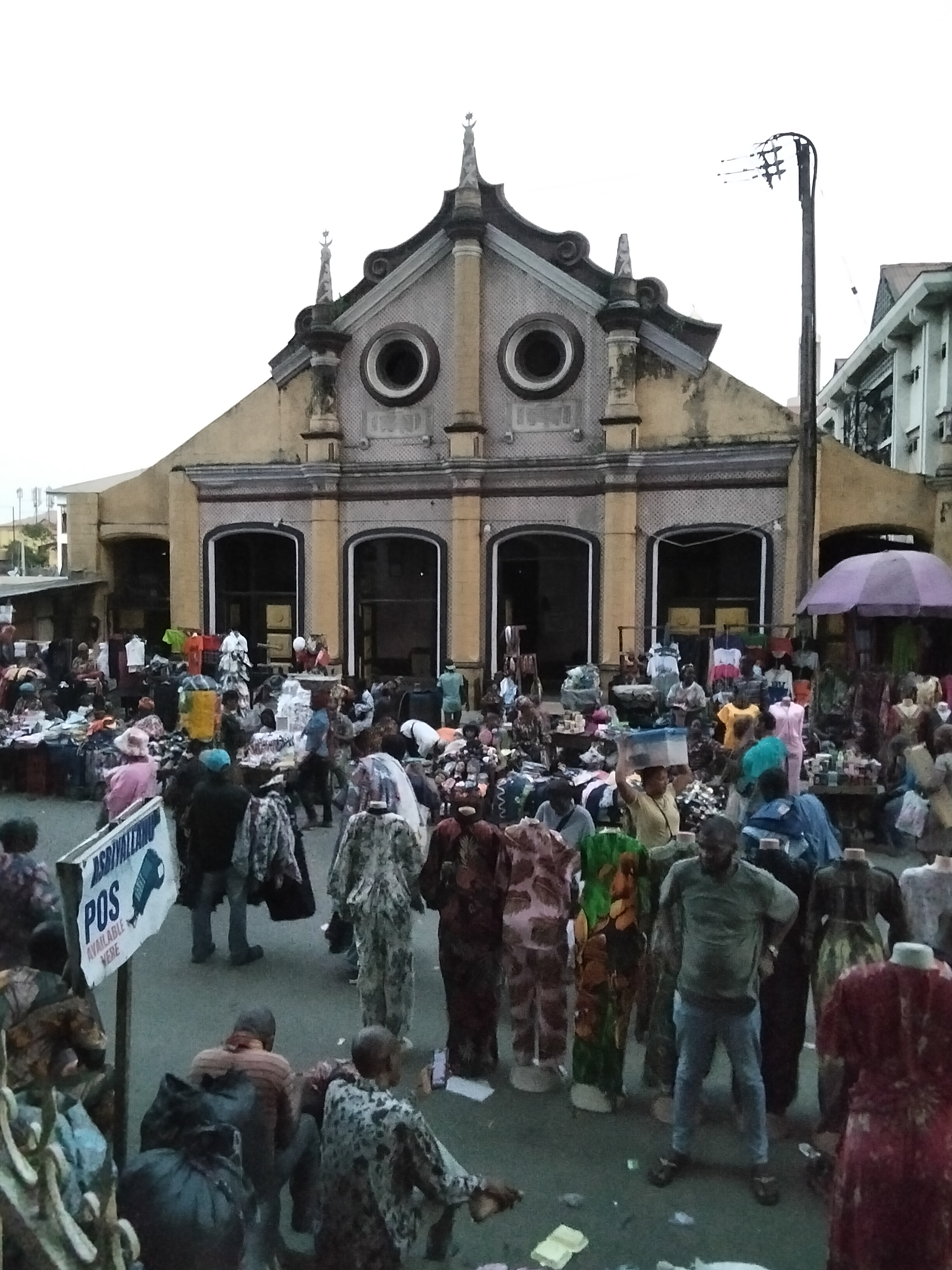
The Mosque in 2024

== Bibliography ==
- Ostien, Philip; Makinde, Abdul-Fatah 'Kola (2012-01-01). "Legal Pluralism in Colonial Lagos: The 1894 Petition of the Lagos Muslims to their British Colonial Masters". Die Welt des Islams. 52 (1): 51–68. doi:10.1163/157006012X627904. ISSN 1570-0607.
