= Fabunmi of Okemesi =

Yoruba chief and warlord in Yorubaland

Fábùnmi Ìṣọ̀lá
- Balogun of the Ekiti-Parapo and Loja-Oke of Imesi-Ile

Loja-Oke of Imesi-ile
- Reign: 1902 - 1903
- Successor: HRM Ladokun Adefenwa Fabunmi II
- Born: Fábùnmi Ìṣọ̀lá Adésóyè c. 1849; Okemesi
- Died: 1903 (age 54); Imesi-ile, Southern Nigeria Protectorate
- Spouse: Falola
- Issue: Ladokun Adefenwa
- Father: Prince Adesoye
- Occupation: Warlord and King
- Military career
- Allegiance: Ekiti people, Okemesi, Imesi-ile
- Rank: Balogun
- Conflicts: Kiriji War

Fabunmi of Okemesi (c. 1849 - 1903) born Prince Fábùnmi Ìṣọ̀lá, also known as Orara l'ada, was a Yoruba warlord, chief and ultimately king. He was known to have singlehandedly triggered the longest civil war in Nigeria - the Kiriji War.

== Early life ==
Prince Fabunmi Isola was born in 1849 in Okemesi (formerly Imesi-igbodo). to Prince Adesoye, a younger brother of Fatimehin Aponlese, the 9th Owa Ooye of Okemesi. His mother was a princess from the town of Ogotun-Ekiti. He was about ten years when Ijesa conquered Okemesi and went on exile at Ila with his father,. His father died in Ila, leaving Fabunmi as the oldest member of his family with huge amount of wealth and slaves. His mother was a Princess from Ogotun. It was while in Ila that he learnt tailoring. He was a very good friend of Prince Adeyale of Ila who later became the military leader of Ila army. When he then travelled to Ibadan to become a war boy under, Akintola, the second son of Balogun Ibikunle. He partook in Iperu and Mamu military expeditions. He soon escaped Ibadan overnight as there were plans to put him to death and sacrifice him to a local deity. When he came back to Okemesi from Ibadan, he practiced tailoring and embroidery while raising his militia army with the slaves he inherited from his father; some relative and youths who were eager to join his army. He is described as being a tall, light skin man whom was impulsive and quick spoken.

== Life as a Warrior ==
In 1878, Fabunmi became known as the single individual who triggered the Kiriji war in Yorubaland. Oyepetun, an Ibadan Administrator (Ajele) was stationed in Okemesi, and his boys were rapacious and evil; forcefully coveting other people’s properties. They had gone to the annual Erinle-odo shrine festival, where Fabunmi was celebrating with friends and acquaintances and had seized food and palm wine meant for the occasion. In the process, they molested Fabunmi’s wife, Falola, who brought the meals and refreshments. Fabunmi was incensed. He ran back home, got his sword, and made for Oyepetun’s compound. He killed everyone he could lay his hands on including the Ajele. Every other member of Oyepetun’s compound still alive and Ibadan residents in Okemesi deserted the town. This was a direct test of Ibadan powers but given the maladministration of many of the Ajales, the news quickly spread across Ekiti, Ijesa and Igbomina. All known Ibadan officers and everyone known to be working with them were massacred and put to sword. Are Latosisa of Ibadan, called on Olojaoke of Okemesi to deliver Fabunmi, his nephew, a prince and heir apparent to him but he refused. Fabunmi then went ahead to put together a coalition of eastern Yoruba army, called Ekitiparapo, with him at the head; in alliance with Ijebu, Egba and Ilorin armies. Ekitiparapo army moving through Imesi-ile quickly overran Igbajo, Iresi, Otan and Ada kingdoms but were beaten back as Ibadan entered the war at Ikirun. The coalition was in disarray. Several Ilorin soldiers were perished in Otin river. This was called Ikirun or Jalumi war.

It was Fabunmi who kept the spirit of the coalition up after the first defeat suffered against Ibadan at Ikirun. For he had told Governor Moloney in 1886, that, ‘because, of all the Ijesa and Ekiti war Chiefs, it was I who took the initiative in throwing off the Ibadan yoke, and declaring war against them. Had it turn out that the Ekitis failed to unite in resistance, or the Ibadans succeeded in inflicting heavier calamities upon our country, my name and my people would be subject to everlasting execration from all our tribes on account of my presumption.' Prince Fabunmi was confirmed the Balogun of the Confederates at Otun. In 1880, Ogedemgbe, along with his large army, joined the Ekitiparapo army at Imesi-ile. It was there Fabunmi voluntarily surrendered the leadership to Ogedemgbe. In 1882, Prince Fabunmi and Chief Arimoro were despatched with a small contingent of Ekitiparapo army to defend Ile-ife against Modakeke and Ibadan army. Kiriji war came to official end on September 23, 1886, when peace treaty was signed . Fabunmi, withdrew his military siege on Modakeke and came back to Imesi-ile where the Ekitiparapo were still stationed, in January 1887.

== Later life ==
After the war, Fabunmi war boys became restless and began to raid several farms, properties, and kidnappings. In 1895, he was arrested, taken before the British officer at Odo-Otin and severely warned. He later moved back to Okemesi where he attempted to seize the throne for himself but failed and was driven out of town. In 1902, Imesi-ile sought after him and installed him as their thirty-eighth king. He reigned for six months and died in 1903. His son, ‘loja Oke Ladokun Adefenwa Fabunmi II succeeded him.
