= East Riding of Yorkshire Constabulary =

Defunct police service of Yorkshire, England

The East Riding of Yorkshire Constabulary was the territorial police force for policing the East Riding of Yorkshire from 1856 to 1968.

Formed as a result of the County and Borough Police Act 1856, it covered all of the East Riding and initially consisted of a Chief Constable, Major Bernard Grenville Layard, and 60 men.

In 1968, the East Riding Constabulary was amalgamated with York City Police and the North Riding of Yorkshire Constabulary to form the York and North-East Yorkshire Police.

Chief Constables

- 1856–1872 : Major Bernard Grenville Layard
- 1872–1899 : Major Henry J Bower
- 1899–1924 : Major William Hugh Dunlop
- 1925 : (Sir) Percy Sillitoe (afterwards Chief Constable of Sheffield, 1926–31)
- 1926–1934 : Captain Archibald Frederick Hordern (afterwards Chief Constable of Cheshire, 1934–35)
- 1934–1939 : ??
- 1939–1942 : Richard Dawnay Lemon (afterwards Chief Constable of Hampshire, 1942–62)
- 1942–1946 : Godwin Edward Banwell (afterwards Chief Constable of Cheshire, 1946–63)
- 1946–1953 : Brigadier John Cheney (afterwards Chief Constable of Buckinghamshire, 1953–68)
- c.1962 : John Wilfred Peter Blenkin
