= Jimoh Aliu =

Nigerian dramatist (1939–2020)

Jimoh Aliu MFR
- Born: 11 November 1939; Okemesi, Nigeria
- Died: 17 September 2020 (aged 80); Ado Ekiti, Nigeria
- Other name: Aworo
- Occupations: Actor; dramatist; producer
- Years active: 1959–2020
- Notable work: Ajalu
- Father: Aliu Fakoya

Jimoh Aliu MFR, ( November 11, 1939 – September 17, 2020), also known as Aworo, was a Nigerian dramatist, sculptor, film writer, playwright and director.

== Early life ==
He was born on November 11, 1939 at Okemesi, a city in Ekiti State, southwestern Nigeria.

His father, Aliu Fakoya, was an Ifa priest who hailed from Oke-Imesi, while his mother hailed from Iloro-Ekiti.

== Career ==
Aliu began acting in 1959 when Akin Ogungbe, a veteran Nigerian dramatist visited his hometown. That same year he joined the Akin Ogungbe theatre group, where he gained some foundational experience in drama and performance. In 1966, after spending seven years with the Ogungbe's troupe, he established "Jimoh Aliu Concert Party", a group based in Ikare in Ondo State southwestern Nigeria.

He later joined the Nigerian Army in 1967, but retired in 1975 to fully focus on drama and promote independent artists under the platform of Jimoh Aliu cultural group. He had produced several television drama series, such as Iku Jare Eda Yanpan yanrin and Fopomoyo that featured king Sunny Ade, a good friend of Aliu's. It was later learned that his good friend, Sunny Ade, slept with his wife, Orisabunmi. Jimoh Aliu ultimately forgave his friend but eventually divorced Orisabunmi.

The major character, Fadeyi Oloro, played by Ojo Arowosegbe became a significant part of Jimoh Aliu's production. The role had originally been played by another actor within Aliu’s group in the then Ondo State. Similarly, the character Orisabunmi was initially portrayed by the wife of the original Fadeyi Oloro before the role became widely associated with the actress later known as Orisabunmi.

== Death ==
Jimoh Aliu died at Ekiti State University Teaching Hospital in Ado-Ekiti on September 17, 2020 after a brief illness. He was 80 years old.

== Filmography ==
- Fopomoyo
- Yanpan yanrin
- Ajalu
- Arelu
- Igbo Olodumare
- Irinkerindo Ninu Igbo Elegbeje
- rukerudo

== Awards ==
- Member of the Federal Republic of Niger
