= Layipo =

Coordinates: 7°23′32″N 3°53′48″E

Layipo or Laipo, also known as Bower's Tower, is a well-known tower in Oke-Are in Ibadan, Oyo State, in southwestern Nigeria. The tower was constructed in 1936 to commemorate Captain Robert Lister Bower, the first British resident in Ibadan, an administrative and diplomatic position.
