= York and North East Yorkshire Police =

Defunct police service of Yorkshire, England

The York and North East Yorkshire Police was a police force in England from 1968 to 1974, covering the North Riding of Yorkshire, the East Riding of Yorkshire, and the county borough of York. It was a merger of the two riding forces (the North Riding of Yorkshire Constabulary and the East Riding of Yorkshire Constabulary) with the York City Police.

The force area was broken up in 1974 and was split between the North Yorkshire Police, Humberside Police, Durham Constabulary and Cleveland Constabulary.

The first Chief Constable from 1968 was Harold Hubert Salisbury, previously the Chief Constable of the North Riding of Yorkshire Constabulary. Salisbury left in 1972 to become Commissioner of Police in South Australia. He was succeeded by Robert Boyes.
