= Orisabunmi =

Nigerian actress (1960-2026

Folake Aremu
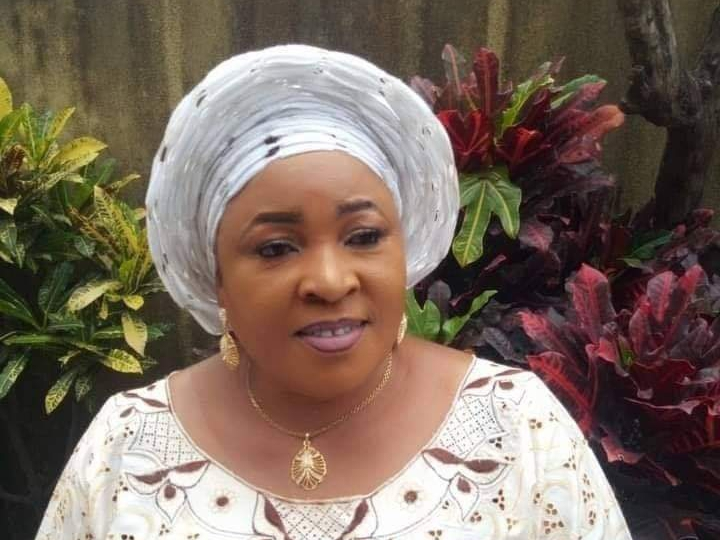
- Aremu in a traditional lace attire
- Born: 10 October 1960; Olla, Kwara State
- Died: 5 January 2021 (aged 60); Ibadan, Oyo State
- Other name: Orisabunmi
- Occupation: Actress
- Years active: 1980s–2021

Folake Aremu (10 October 1960 – 5 January 2021), popularly known as Oriṣabunmi was a Nigerian veteran actress. She was known for her roles as a priestess, pacifist, white witch or the good witch in some of her movies. Aremu is considered one of Yoruba's most talented actresses. She was nominated for the Most Searched Actress award posthumously at the 2021 NET Honours. She died on 5th of January 2021 in her Ibadan residence.

== Early life ==
Folake Aremu was a native of Olla, Kwara State, Nigeria and attended Ilu Olla Primary School and Secondary Commercial College, Eruku.

== Career ==
Folake Aremu was a teacher for two years and later as a secretary at Sunny Radio in Ilorin, before going into the movie industry. Jimoh Aliu also known as Aworo was the one who introduced her to theatre in the 1980s. She soon started appearing in movies produced by Aworo. She first appeared in a stage play known as Ori Ma Binu. She rose to fame from her role in Arelu as Oriṣabunmi (which translates literally as "the gods gifted me") in 1987.

She married Jimoh Aliu six years after they met and they later divorced. She died four months after the passing of her ex-husband, Aworo on 5 January 2021.

== Filmography ==
- Oluwerimagboojo
- Ayanmo Eda
- Iya Alakara
- Fopomoyo
- Koto Orun
- Agbaarin
- Yanponyanrin
- Ago Kan Oru (2003)
- Lagidigba (2000)
- Arelu (1987)
- Ori Ma Binu
