= Kiriji War =

1877–1893 civil war in present-day Nigeria

Kiriji War (Ogun Kírìjí)
| Date | July 30, 1877– March 14, 1893 (15 years and 227 days) |
| Location | Yorubaland, now Southwestern Nigeria |
| Result | Military Stalemate: Ekiti people gain independence on September 23, 1886; Fighting persists between the Ibadan and the Ilorin kingdoms; British-Ijebu War; Capture of Ilorin by Royal Niger Company in 1897; Siege of Oyo |
| Territorial changes | Subsequent colonisation and annexation of Yorubaland by the British Empire into the Southern Nigeria Protectorate |

Belligerents
| Western Yoruba (Ibadan): Ibadan Republic; Iwo Kingdom; Igbajo, and other Oyo Yoruba towns in the region formerly under the Old Oyo; Offa Kingdom; Modakeke | Eastern Yoruba (Ekiti-Parapo): Ijesha kingdom; Ekiti confederacy, including the Akure Kingdom; Akoko confederacy, Yagba Confederacy including Eruku Town.; Egba kingdom, the city state of Abeokuta; Ijebu Kingdom; Ila Kingdom and the Igbomina confederacy; Ilorin Emirate; Ife Kingdom |

Commanders and leaders
| Obadoke Latoosa, Aare Ona Kakanfo of Ibadan †; Ajayi Ogboriefon, Balogun †; Babalola Ajayi Kupolu †; Balogun Ali of Iwo; Balogun Ajayi Osungbekun | Fabunmi of Okemesi, later Owa Ooye of Imesi-Ile; Ogedengbe of Ilesa; Odu of Ogbagi-Akoko; Ogunmodede of the Ijesha; Karara of Ilorin; Adeyale of Ila and the Igbomina; Olugbosun of Oye; Erinfolami Agbenijabiogun Fakuade of Oye; Onafowokan of Ijebu; Ologun of Owo; Ogunbulu of Aisegba |

Strength
| Estimated 180,000 (Ibadan) | 75,000 (Ekiti); 30,000 (Ife) |

Casualties and losses
| Unknown | Unknown |

The Kiriji War, also known as the Ekiti–Parapo War, was a 16-year-long civil war between the subethnic kingdoms of the Yoruba people, specifically divided between the Western Yoruba, which was mainly the Ibadan and Oyo-speaking Yorubas, and the Eastern Yoruba, who were the Ekiti people, Ijesha, Ijebu, YagbaEkiti people and others.

== Reasons for the war ==
- During the war, all of the subethnic groups of the Yoruba either supported the Ibadan or the Ekiti . The main reason for the civil war was an attempt to halt the expansive efforts of the Ibadan city-state, which attempted to replace the Oyo Empire as the dominant region in Yorubaland. In addition, Ibadan wanted a unified Yoruba nation similar to that of the Oyo Empire, while the Ekiti wanted a loose confederation of kingdoms that had existed in the Ekiti region. The fall of the Oyo Empire, which had dominated the region for 500 years left a gap in the government of Yorubaland. Many city states, which were previous provinces of the empire, rose up to replace the dominant Oyo Empire, including Ibadan. Ibadan had won the 1840 Osogbo War and the Battle of Ijaiye in 1862 and had grown in immense power, almost rising to that of its predecessor.
- Ekiti, Akoko, Igbomina, YagbaEkiti, and Ijesha kingdoms had, for several years, gone through unimaginable subjugations by Aare Latosisa of Ibadan through his appointed agents, called Ajele. The Ajeles, were despotic, uncaring, autocratic, and indulged in excesses.
- The European industrial revolution increased demand for African resources; the needed access to the coasts by kingdoms to trade; larger kingdoms who assumed power attempted to centralize power even though Yoruba ethnic groups were made up of several kingdoms.
- Throughout the seventeenth and eighteenth centuries when Oyo had the absolute power throughout Yoruba, Nupe and part of Dahomey, she was able to ensure equilibrium among all kingdoms and relative peace. In the early nineteenth century when all the powers had gone, Ibadan, Ijaye, new Oyo and Abeokuta wanted to replace old Oyo. Older kingdoms made up of Ife and Ijebu, wanted to expand their territories.
- Ibadan destroyed Ijaye; checkmated Ilorin and administered Ibarapa, Osun, Ife, Ijesa, Ekiti, Igbomina, YagbaEkiti, and Akoko. It failed to control Egba and Ijebu and the vital trade routes to the coast. It failed to efficiently administer these kingdoms.
- The refugee settlements in Ibadan, Ijaye and old Oyo wanted to avenge the destruction of old Oyo Empire in the hands of the Ilorin Fulani. For self-interest, each wanted to achieve this individually and bring the re-united kingdoms under its own rulership and control. While Ikirun shared the idea of re-unified kingdoms, Ekiti, Ijesa, Akoko, YagbaEkiti and Igbomina wanted a confederacy.

== Effects of the war ==
- Several of the nineteenth century wars in Yorubaland resulted in desertions, family separations.
- It also brought about concentration of Yoruba people in many cities and towns in Yorubaland, which today are still in existence.
- It brought about loyalties among kingdoms and the emergence of powerful leaders such as Oluyole, Sodeke, Ogunmola, Kurumi, Latosisa, Ogedengbe, along with its peculiar leaderships characteristics.
- Yoruba kingdoms became creative with different political systems. Ibadan's republicanism; Ijaye's military dictatorship; Abeokuta's federalism and Ekitiparapo confederacy.
- The resulting several wars created an excuse for the British to take over the whole of Yorubaland as they were constantly called to interfere in Yoruba affairs.
- Many of the kingdoms became weary of these several wars and called for British protections.
- It was the relentless attacks by Ibadan armies in the whole of the northeastern parts of Yorubaland which birthed the Ekitiparapo. But it was that confederacy which also saved and preserved many of these kingdoms to this day.

== Ibadan political system ==
Ibadan set up a political system for all conquered kingdoms. Each of them was placed under the administration of an Ibadan Chief, called Baba-kekere.

=== Ibadan chief (Baba-kekere) ===
The Ibadan chief, the administrator, was domiciled in Ibadan. He functioned to ensure all the towns’ loyalty to Ibadan; collected all tributes and other obligations from the subject towns through his Ajeles and accounted to Aare Ona-Kakanfo of Ibadan. It was the poor administration of this political systems which largely caused the revolt against Ibadan and the loss of her hegemony. All dominions under Ibadan rule felt the excruciating pain. Many small villages and towns were deserted because of this. It was a master-slave political system.

To carry out his functions, the chiefs, appointed agents (called Ajeles) who were stationed in each town and reported activities in each town to the chief in Ibadan. Appointment of an Ajele, was based solely on loyalty and ability; not place of origin, such that they came from all over Yorubaland including trusted relatives, war boys and slaves. The chief's household needs were met by the towns. He made emergency requirements which the towns must attend to.

The chief had to pass messages to towns under his administration. He would send any of his slaves. Immediately outside Ibadan, this messengers would be treated with royalty, and all expenses borne by the locals in those towns.

=== Ajele (agent) ===
The Ajele collected tributes on schedule; farm produce and sent to Ibadan government through chief. They ensured chief's portion is kept apart. He filed regular reports with the chief and updated him about happenings in the kingdom. The Ajele received visitors and ensured all Ibadan chiefs and messengers passing by were properly treated and accommodated. The town was also bound to supply war men whenever Ibadan needed. Each house was levied a weekly or biweekly tax. This was paid to the local king who would then forward all collections to the town Ajele. More often, emergency taxes were levied on the towns for cash and food whenever Ibadan prepared for many of her wars.

While few of the Ajeles were disciplined many treated towns under their domain with disgust; made unnecessary demands; and used their positions as avenue to make wealth. They and Ibadan officials would forcefully covet farmland and crops; wantonly destroyed locals farm produce; forcefully take wives and daughters and rape them in the presence of their husbands and fathers. Ajele boys would go to the market and forcefully commandeered the food stuffs beyond what they needed; would force women to take the food to Ajele house. They would covet rich locals’ possessions. All eastern kingdoms of Ijesa and Ekiti towns were completely impoverished and ruined because of these constant demands while the Ajeles were living in lavish opulence. All these were repeated for about three decades to 1876. Ajeles required attendants and messengers to send messages from village to village and onwards to Ibadan. This made Ajele household very large and resulted in constant regular levies of foodstuffs on the locals.

== Ekiti-Parapo ==
=== 1877 ===
Aare Latosisa of Ibadan was having problem trading because of the excruciating trade embargo placed on it by the Egbas and the Ijebus. He decided he would have to destroy the Egba kingdom and suppress the Ijebu kingdom. The opportunity came, when he offered to help the Alaafin of Oyo transport imports from the coast through Egbaland. Some of Ibadan messengers were seized. On July 31, 1877, Aare Latosisa of Ibadan declared war on Egba. The Awujale of the Ijebu kingdom knew the risk to his kingdom if the Egbas lost the war so he decided to align against Ibadan.

As events were unfolding in western Yorubaland, another problem was brewing in the east. Prince Fabunmi, a private militia leader was celebrating with his friends in Erinle shrine, at Okemesi (formerly Imesi-Igbodo). The palm-wine drink meant for the occasion was waylaid by Ajele boys and they came to the shrine with swords and cutlasses; took all the food items and began to caress Prince Fabunmi companion. Prince Fabunmi became enraged; went home and took his sword then proceeded to Ajele compound and killed most members of the household who could not run including the Ajele. The news quickly spread all over the eastern Yoruba land. Many Ibadan officials and relations in most parts of Ekiti and Ijesa countries, were murdered. When the news got to Latosisa, he sent messenger to Oloja-oke of Okemesi, the local king who was also Fabunmi's uncle to kill him. Prince Fabunmi beheaded one of the messengers and sent the head back to Latosisa through the other messenger.

Knowing the gravity of what he just did, Prince Fabunmi called the meeting of all military leaders in eastern Yorubaland to come together so they could deliver themselves from Ibadan dominion. Many contributed troops and held several meetings at Okemesi along with members of Ekitiparapo Society from Lagos who committed to provide vital arms and ammunitions that would be needed for successful prosecution of the war. It was at those meetings Ekitiparapo name was adopted for the multi-kingdom military. Oaths were taken to fight until Ibadan was brought down. Egba, Ijebu and Ilorin countries also joined the alliance. Ilorin joined the alliance with hopes to replace lordship over the kingdoms once she helps to destroy Ibadan.

=== 1878 ===
It was about these periods the idea of single forces alliance started to grow around many eastern kingdoms. the eastern Yoruba people began to raise a new set of leading warriors. They were slaves, war boys and free born who had gone to Ibadan to receive the best military training in the art of war. They were Ogedemgbe of Ilesa, Aduloju and Falowo of Ado; Prince Fabunmi of Okemesi, Erinfolami Fakuade and Olugbosun of Oye, Adeyale of Ila, Odu of Ogbagi and Bakare of Afa. They came back to set up their private armies who were fiercely loyal and stood to gain in the successes of their leader. They were adored and respected. They all had personal score to settle with Ibadan because of the horror they and their people had gone through and still yet. Another act that encouraged the alliance was the opening of the Ondo road from Ilaje and Ikale countries in the 1870s. The road made it easier to trade and procure arms and ammunition.

About 1858, some Ekiti and Ijesa who were returnees from Sierra-Leone and Americas or those not shipped away who were domiciled in Lagos formed Ijesa Association then later as at 1876, transformed into Ekiti-Parapo Society. They were supposed to be a Christian union but were worried about the horror their people were being subjected by Ibadan and wanted to change the situation. They requested military trainings from the Lagos Administrator. Unlike access through Abeokuta and Ijebu which allowed Ibadan to monitor movements to the interior, the opening up of alternate Ondo road allowed the Society to be more involved in the affairs of their people because it allowed them to visit. Some who moved in permanently were used to pass information to Lagos.

=== 1878 ===
In August 1878, A Confederate army moved from Okemesi to Imesi-ile. They attacked Igbajo, an Ibadan ally, took captives and burnt it down. Many inhabitants including small Ibadan army were pursued to Ikirun. The confederate laid siege on Ikirun. Ijesa, under the leadership of Arimoro, Ogunmodede and Obe encamped at Iba. Igbomina under Prince Adeyale; and Ekiti under Prince Fabunmi were stationed between Ijesa and Ilorin forces. Ikirun sent urgent message to Are Latosisa who quickly dispatched Ibadan army under the leadership of Balogun Ajayi Ogboriefon. Ibadan routed all the confederate armies and pursued Ilorin army into the River Otin many of whom perished there. The Ekiti and Ijesa armies were scattered in different directions. The saving grace for the confederate was an urgent message to Ogboriefon to abruptly stop the war and return to Ibadan immediately. Prince Adeyale was killed; Afomodi, the Balogun of Ijero was captured and taken to Ibadan where he later died; and Prince Fabunmi captured Chief Ilori, the Osi of Ibadan. This was called the battle of Ikirun or the Jalumi war. On December 23, 1878, the victorious Balogun Ogboriefon and Ibadan army arrived in Ibadan. Prince Fabunmi and the Confederates were hosted by Prince Okinbaloye in Otun. Ogedemgbe refused to commit to the war but Ijesa chiefs sent representatives to Otun town. Prince Fabunmi was confirmed the Balogun of the Confederate army in Otun town.

== The decisive battle (1879–1886) ==
The routing of the confederate alliance in Ikirun was a major setback. Ilorin peace overture was snubbed by Aare Latosisa. Oloja-oke Merunpe of Imesi-ile had gone to Ibadan to pledge allegiance and make peace; but when he got back home, the youths in the town rose up against him and he was deposed by his people. He spent the rest of his life in Oshogbo. However, Prince Fabunmi, the instigator of the war; and all Ekiti and Ijesa warrior chiefs were resolute to prosecute the war to logical end. The Confederate got an important ally. The Alaafin of Oyo, Oba Adeyemi, who had before supported the emergence of Ibadan as the absolute power in Yorubaland became suspicious because not only did Ibadan seized Oyo towns hitherto occupied by Ijaye before it was destroyed, Ibadan turned the Alaafin into a nominal king and began to interfere in Oyo rulership. Therefore, The Alaafin found opportunity for self-preservation in two powers in northeast (Ijesa and Ekiti) and southwest (Egba and Ijebu) of Yorubaland against Ibadan. The Confederate was able to obtain supports of Egba and Ijebu who shutoff trade to the coasts against Ibadan. Ijebu opened up Isoya road to send reliefs to the northeast through Ife territory and stationed Seriki Ogunsigun who kept watch. Ilorin, under Balogun Karara, laid siege on Offa, an Ibadan ally. Ondo was neutral to both the Confederate and Ibadan armies; thus, the only road Ibadan could trade arms and ammunitions was through Ondo road.

Again, Ekiti Parapo army headquarters was relocated from Otun to Okemesi. Since Ilorin had lost many warriors in the Jalumi war, they could only send some of their infantry and cavalry to join the Confederates in Okemesi. In exchange, the Confederates sent some warriors under Ogunmodede of Ilesa and Chief Ajayi Ofa of Otun to Ilorin. As at those time, Aduloju and Ogedemgbe, even after many gifts, refused to join the Confederates. It was suggested that Ogedemgbe was reluctant because he already fought Ibadan twice and might come to the conclusion fighting them again would not get the desired result or as a result of some covenant he had with Ibadan. Which was why after he agreed to join the confederates, he still didn't want Latosisa come into battle nor engage Ibadan in open combat. But it was on record in 1878, Ogedemgbe attacked Idoani and he got the stiffest fight of his life. He was only able to crush Idoani and return to Itaogbolu, later in 1879 after he lost several of his army members in the battle.

On April 7, 1879, Balogun Ajayi Ogboriefon died of illness. The news was a morale booster to the Confederates. They finalized their plans and moved again to Imesi-ile. By the time they got to Igbajo, the town was already deserted, and Oba Famodun escaped to Oshogbo. He was with Ataoja of Oshogbo for three years before moving to Ire where he died. Ibadan again, repelled the Confederates at Ikirun until they retreated and encamped permanently at a hill which is about one hour walk from Imesi-ile.

In 1879, Ogedemgbe and his large army joined the Confederates at Imesi-ile. Prince Fabunmi, who was much younger, immediately relinquished the leadership of Ekitiparapo army to him. It was at this stage more sophisticated weapons unknown to Ibadan camp were introduced to the war by the Ekitiparapo. These long range, large-muzzled and high impact guns, were imported by Okitiparapo Society of Lagos. It was the high and large echoes of noise by these guns the name “Kiriji” came about.

Latosisa made frantic efforts to obtain similar weapons on Ibadan side. He wrote several high-powered letters to Oyo sons living in Lagos to emulate Okitiparapo Society of Lagos but he got very little assistance. This new advanced warfare demanded the constitution of Rifle Corps and experts in building trenches. Alfred Labinjo, an indigene of Imesi-ile, a resident of Lagos and Guruje of Abeokuta were carefully selected. It was a war like nothing before. Ibadan had to construct mud walls and avoid direct contacts with Ekitiparapo's long range guns.

In 1882, another war front opened. Ife, as one of Ibadan subject had to supply troop to Igbajo under Ibadan command. Latosisa wanted to attack Osu to spite Okitipupa, but Ife refused to allow Ibadan. For this reason, Ibadan joined with Modakeke to overrun Ife. Ekitiparapo in support of Ife, provided high-powered warriors led by Prince Fabunmi and Chief Arimoro to obliterate Modakeke. Ijebu army stationed at Isoya, under Seriki Ogunsigun supported the alliance. Ekitiparapo Society created a settlement in the Ikale area called Aiyesan. This colony served as the main depot where ammunitions and military wares employed by Ekitiparapo were stored before moving them to the war zones in the interior.

In 1882, Ibadan suffered several losses in Modakeke. Ibadan warriors’ deaths in Igbajo, among which were Kupolu, the Infantry commander; Chief Akintaro (Osi), Chief Ajeigbe (the Ekerin). In Ibadan, a whole street was destroyed by fire. Latosisa and his war boys were beginning to be depressed by several of the losses coupled with hostility from several fronts in all of Yorubaland. Between 1884 – 1885 as the war dragged on. Ibadan was about surrendering and returned home but a Chief Taiwo from Lagos supplied desperately needed ammunition and weapons to Latosisa. All efforts made by Ekitiparapo Society to Lagos Governor to stop the sale came to naught. This suddenly intensified the war again. It was at that intensity Albert Labinjo, the leader of the Confederate Rifle Corps was wounded on July 13, 1885. He passed on about five days after.

In August 1885, Chief Momoh Latosisa, the Are-Ona-Kakanfo of Ibadan, died in Igbajo camp and Chief Ajayi Osungbekun became the Balogun. The new Balogun did not command respect. Ibadan army's morale was shattered. Even Ekitiparapo, although, now had advantage became war fatigued coupled with the fact that ammunitions supplied to Ibadan by Chief Taiwo of Lagos were exhausted. The stage for peaceful resolution of the war was set.

== War organization: Ekitiparapo ==
The Confederate camp was about forty minutes’ walk from Imesi-ile. The Ibadan camp was about sixty minutes’ walk from Igbajo. Both camps stood on two high hills facing each other. There was an old road among mountains linking Imesi-ile and Igbajo across the camps. There was a valley between the two camps. The two main water sources to the camps were, Alapoto stream which passed through Confederate camp and the war field; and Fejeboyu stream ( so named because of so much blood spilled into the stream such that at time it was not fit to drink during the war. It was formerly known as Eleriko) which divided the camps roughly in two. The Confederates made bamboo huts. Ibadan converted to mud house after the introduction of long-range guns by the Confederates. About 40,000 inhabitants in the confederate's camp (60,000 on Ibadan camp). A large proportion of these were made up of large number of wives and children of the warriors. It grew into a regular town. The Confederates had Ogun shrine (the god of war and iron) where they worshipped; and smithy spot where tools and ammunition of war were locally made and repaired.

Ekitiparapo was made up largely of Ekiti and Ijesa warriors. But there were small contingents from Igbomina and Akoko. Ogedemgbe became the commander-in-chief when he arrived Imesi-ile camp in late 1879 when Ekitiparapo Balogun, Prince Fabunmi, yielded leadership to Ogedemgbe, which was why he led second Ekitiparapo warriors to defend Ife against Modakeke and Ibadan. Ogedemgbe had the title of Seriki of the Ijesa.

Ogedemgbe commanded lots of respect as the representative of the Confederacy. He arbitrated among the chiefs and the people in the camp; and his words carried weight. He carried everyone along. He had to constantly meet and discuss war plans and strategies with the leading chiefs who formed the Confederate High Command before presenting it to the general populace within the camp.

Ekitiparapo Society members – These were emigres who came from Lagos, Abeokuta and other coaster town. They had financial muscles and were well enlightened in the way of the white man. They participated in many discussions and their words carried important weights. They made peace negotiations hard for visiting foreigners.

Kings – None of the Ekitiparapo kings resided in the camp. Couple of them lived within Imesi-ile town or other close towns. They played important role ensuring enough food supplies to the camp; frequently dispatching youth volunteers to join the war. They were respected by the warriors and they, in turn, would not take any decision unless in agreement with the war leaders. The kings provided important diplomacy which helped the Confederates won supports.

Fighters

- private armies of the chief warriors – represented the largest professional standing army and always at camp. Ogedemgbe brought about ten thousand.
- Ekitiparapo emigres – they were expert advisors, interpreters. Labinjo, a native of Imesi-ile was one of them. A patriot, fierce and passionate. He was immensely popular.
- Citizens soldiers from Ekiti, Ijesa, Igbomina and Akoko countries. The envoys from the camp would go to surrounding kingdoms to appeal to the kings to send volunteers. The kings, at regular intervals of market days would call his subject and appeal to them to go join the war at Imesi-ile.
- Others – young men from all over Ekiti, Ijesa, Igbomina and Akoko constantly arrived at Imesi-ile for a chance to be called an iyayu. It was a badge of honor to be so, called.

Food

- Individuals cultivated land and grew farm produce in Imesi-ile.
- Some came to the camp carrying food along.
- A lot of women on the camp did trading.
- Kings sent food to their kindreds in the camp.

Finance-The war was financed through slave sales and food products.

== Attempts at peace ==
Several attempts were made at peace from 1879 to 1886. All parties wanted a zero-sum peace agreement until events around 1885 onwards changed:

- 1878–1879 – Chief Momodu Latosisa wanted Ijebu and Egba to open roads to the coasts so Ibadan could trade. He sent gifts; used Ijebu traders in Ibadan to appeal to Awujale; commissioned Alaafin of Oyo to appeal to Egba. Peace could not be achieved because these kingdoms knew the dangers to their domains if Ibadan was to have access to buy arms and ammunitions.
- 1881- Chief Aderin, the Ooni of Ile-ife, sent his commissioners to Imesi-ile and Igbajo to appeal to both Confederates and Ibadan to give peace a chance. Both parties agreed on everything except who to disperse first. Neither party wanted to leave the camp first. This also failed.
- 1882 – Chief Onafowokan, the Balogun of Ijebu at Ore reached a direct settlement with Ibadan which would allow Ibadan to purchase arms and ammunition through Oru. Awujale of Ijebu, Oba Ademiyewo Fidipote, was totally against opening the route to Ibadan. He was forced into exile from Ijebu to Epe. But Egba had sworn the only time they would lay down arms was Latosisa should be put to death; Ibadan dissolved and turned to no man's land. They threatened Balogun Onafowokan and made trade along Oru \dangerous through kidnappings.
- 1883 – Also failed, the mission led by Chief Ajasa, the Apena of Lagos, consisted of Lagos residents.
- 1884–1885 – This was the first direct missionary involvement with the peace mission. Rev. J.B. Wood was sent to Kijiri camp. None of the parties, directly or indirectly involved with the war was ready to give an inch. They wanted the war to be decisive. None of them trusted Chief Momoh Latosisa, the Aare-Ona-Kakanfo of Ibadan. They feared him and Ibadan with trepidation. Ibadan had neither regard for tradition nor for kingship. Latosisa had insatiable passion to lord Ibadan over Yorubaland. So even though, they voice interest in peace, secretly, they wanted Ibadan powers to be decimated.
- 1885–1886
  - In month of June 1885, Oba Ademiyewo Fidipote, died in exile. That opened opportunity to install Aboki, and to resolve the question of opening the coast to trade as the Ijebu had always wanted; and resolved any problem that could have arisen to bring back and re-install, Oba Ademiyewo Fidipote, from exile.
  - On August 31, 1885, the greatest obstacle to peace in Yorubaland, Aare-Ona-Kakanfo, Momoh Latosisa, the leader of Ibadan forces, died in Igbajo camp.
  - As at last 1885 to early 1886, most important members of Ekitiparapo Society in Lagos were very desirous of peace but quite few of them wanted it to continue.
  - The Confederate and Ibadan camps began to look forward to future opportunity for peace. Only Ilorin forbade peace. Chief Karara, in total disregard for Emir of Ilorin, encamped against Offa.
  - 1886 was also the start of Anglo-French rivalry for African resources, so the earlier postures of British's non-interference with the activities in the Yoruba interior was no longer tenable.
  - 1886, Captain C.A. Maloney, of Lagos appointed two missionaries as envoys to the interior. They were Revs. Samuel Johnson and Charles Philips.
  - On Thursday September 23, 1886. Proclamation of Peace was performed by the Special Commissioner H. Higgins and Oliver Smiths. Ogedemgbe, the Commander of Ekitiparapo forces and Osungbekun, the Balogun of Ibadan came forward and sworn to eternal friendship.

== After peace treaty (1886–1893) ==
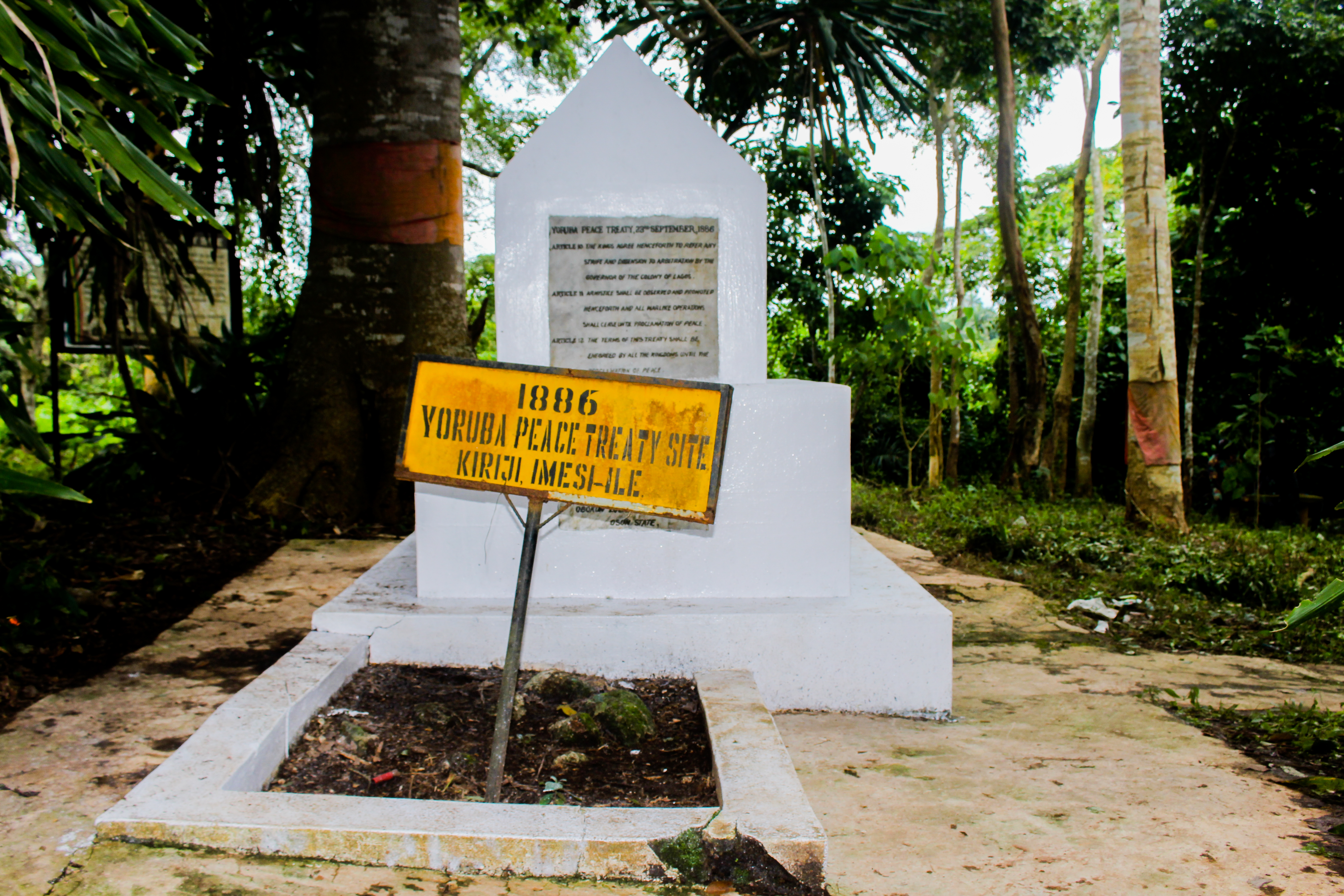
1886 Yoruba Peace Treaty site

- After the 1886 treaty was signed, Ibadan kept her Ikirun military outpost intact. For that reason, the Confederate leaders decided to station at Imesi-ile to watch out for any move by Ibadan. Also, Ekitiparapo would not disband since Ilorin war had not ended and they had exchanged Ekitiparapo warriors with Ilorin in 1879.
- In January 1887, Prince Fabunmi ensured, Ekitiporapo, Ibadan and Ijebu armies dispersed from Modakeke.
- Offa fell to Ilorin army in July 1887.
- On March 14, 1893, Ilorin camp at Offa; Ibadan camp at Ikirun and Confederates at Imesi-ile dispersed after a meeting with Captain Bower. This was the final end of hostilities.

== Weaponry and tactics ==
The civil war saw one of the most technically advanced and decisive wars in Western Africa, with the use of cannons and imported guns from Hamburg, Germany. Weapons were also imported through the Lagos Harbor and Benin. The types of guns used by the Ekiti-Parapo, include modern breech-loading firearms such as the snider rifles, Martini-Henry rifles, and the Winchester repeaters. The Ekiti-Parapo also used several modern tactics like the building of trenches and platoons, a spy network with the headquarters in the town of Ilara-Mokin, and the use of animal behavior and symbols as signals in the war.

== British Intervention and Peace Treaty ==
The war unofficially ended with the signing of a peace treaty of September 23, 1886 at Imesi-ile, a town in Osun State. This granted independence to the Èkìtì union. However, conflict still occurred around the Ijebu area that did not end till the conquering of the Ijebu by the British during the British-Ijebu War. Sir Robert Lister Bower convinced the 2 warring sides to surrender as they had both been severely weakened during the war. Unable to prevent the occupation of the British, Southwestern Nigeria was subsequently declared a protectorate of the British Empire. The casualties of the war are unknown.

== Etymology ==
The name "Kiriji" is an onomatopoeic word that is said to describe the sound of cannons used by the Èkìtì-Parapọ̀ troops, and it was the first war in the region that used these weapons. The other name, the Èkìtì-Parapọ̀ War, comes from the name given to the Eastern Yoruba forces, and means in the Yoruba language "Ekiti Union."
