= Imesi-Ile =

Ancient town in Nigeria

Coordinates: 7.832°N 4.837°E

Imesi-Ile is an ancient town in the northeastern part of the Obokun Local Government in Osun State, Nigeria. In the 19th century, this town was the epicenter of the Jalumi and the Kiriji wars among the Yoruba nations, and the foundation of peace among all warring Yoruba kingdoms, in Nigeria. The town is about one-hour drive from Ilesa; and less than an-hour drive from Osogbo, Osun state capital. It is located on an extremely high hill and almost entirely surrounded by mountains. Because of its unique location and its natural hills and caves within the mountains covering several miles; it was an easy choice for protections during wars in the historic past.

== Etymology ==
Imesi-Ile has undergone several name changes over the centuries. It was originally called Oke-mesin, which literarily translated to a hilly town where climber could easily come to ridicule because the town is situated on an elevated plateau. Thereafter, it was changed to Imesi-Ipole which was conflicted with a sister kingdom in Ekiti state. Then it was named Oke-mesi, fashioned after one of her small hills, called Oke-iro, where Amosi, an elderly man baked, himself in the sun – Oke Amosi and later to Oke-mesi. Imesi-Ile was the final name adopted to signify the home of all imesis including those in Ekiti and Ogun states.

== History ==
The probable first inhabitants in today’s Imesi-Ile were Ekiti people They had with them bronze implements, wooden bows and arrows which could not cope with the giant trees, dense forest, and wild animals of those days. They faced uncertainties and near extinction and had to relocate up northern part of the country. Several hundred years later, the Oloja, from Ondo, migrated to the present Imesi-Ile. Within weeks, his half-brother, Odunmorun, also relocated from Ondo to join him and was settled in the present Odunmorun family compound. As Oloja, expanded and moved up north, he discovered a hut owned and occupied by, Eye. Imesi-Ile received her formal original name, Oke-mesin, between the 10th and 11th century AD, when Owa Ooye Saga, a prince of the Olofin of Ile-ife migrated and joined the other families. He arrived with the crown gift from his father and thus, was the first Owa Ooye of Imesi-Ile. Since her founding, many of her citizens had drifted away and founded new settlements named Imasai in Ogun state; Imesi-Lasigidi and Okemesi (formerly called Imesi-Igbodo or Imesi-Odo) both in Ekiti state. Also, many settlers relocated to Imesi-Ile from different Yoruba towns.

== Kingship ==
There are three ruling houses in Imesi-Ile. They are (i) Ako (ii) Imose (iii) Ilerio. Owa-Ooye of Imesi-Ile, a first-class king, is assisted by a council of traditional chiefs to oversee traditional affairs of the town.

Oba Ooye Saga was the first king in Imesi-Ile. His father was Olofin of Ile-ife. His stepbrother was Owa Jaka of Ilesa with whom he had cordial relationship to the level one of his children, Lukan, was installed the first Lejoka of Ilesa. Imesi-Ile used to send successor when a Lejoka passed until modern changes were affected in Ilesa. Oba Saga had many wives and children; and a large compound with entrance facing the street of Odobi. On his arrival, he planted a statue at the gateway to Imesi-Ile by Odobi which is named Orisa-otutu.

After the death of Saga, his son Imuroko was installed. He did a lot to improve the town. He was able to tackle several difficulties of those days. He was succeeded by Losin who had to contend with threats of wars and invasions plus fear of insurrection by powerful subjects within his domain, among whom was Agba-ogo who was very skilled in clairvoyancy. Owa Ooye Lusin was succeeded by Agbaogo. Owa Ooye Agbaogo was thoughtful and cared for his people. In his attempt to protect his people, he would disappear out of sight. In one of those attempts to acquire more mysterious protective powers, he went away for several months. When he would not return for such long time, the community concluded he must have gone with the spirits, so they installed his son, as the new king. So dismayed were his people when he suddenly reappeared. He was angered by the news that his son had been made king in his absence, so he had no choice than to disappear again. At the spot where he disappeared, according to William Ojo, “…a strong brass chain emerged from the earth recoiling to the length of 10 or more feet on the surface of the ground. It would sometimes be reduced to a shortness of 2 or 3 feet at times. The spot and the chain itself may be seen behind Imesi’s palace until to-day…”

The eighth king in Imesi-Ile was Owa Ooye Agboreledo Osuntaboye. His reign witnessed several inter-tribal wars and fear of attacks. He seemed not a favorite of his people because of his tyrannical and highhandedness disposition. It was during his mis-rule and maladministration several citizens emigrated to different countries at Ajase-opo and Imesi-Lasigidi. The king felt lonely, isolated, and sad. After his passing, his successor, Orifioye, refused to adopt the Owa title ‘…mindful of the imprecations levelled at it by the last holder and so they agreed to call the new Oba “The Oloja-Oke of Okemesi” … ‘ It was Oloja-oke Orifioye’s son named, Agodogbomokun, who led the secession from Imesi-Ile with sixty-seven men and a dog to the present Okemesi in Ekiti state. Their displeasure arose from incessant attacks on Imesi-Ile by neighboring suzerains.

The thirty-second king was Aole. He was a descendant of Owa-Oye but his mother was from Ibokun. He was very disliked by his subjects. He was wicked, short tempered and unprincipled, such that unsuspecting of plans against him he was called out of the palace to view a strange object outside the town’s gateway towards Igbajo. As he stepped out, the Gbedu drum, a national emblem for deposing an objectionable king was sounded. He had no choice than to return to his maternal town at Ibokun where he later died.

Fasan Alosoija became the thirty-fourth Oloja-oke. It was during his reign war broke out in Ilesa. He decided to volunteer in the war. It was while in Ilesa, Merunpe connived with the support of Ibadan, where he grew up as a youth, and made himself king. Alosoija died at Ilesa. Oloja-oke Merunpe was on the throne for thirteen years. He was very mean and dishonest. It was on the thirteenth year of his reign was about to begin the longest war in today’s Nigeria history, the Kiriji war. Merunpe knowing it was the support of Ibadan that got him on the throne was reluctant to support Ekitiparapo confederacy against Ibadan. So, he ran to Ibadan to conspire against his people. While on the way back, Imesi-Ile people sounded the Gbedu drum so he could no longer return to his kingdom. He died at Osogbo. After Merunpe was deposed, Oloja-oke Luoye Arokosewaji was installed the thirty-sixth king.

The following are monarchs since the first settlement in chronological order:

Chronological list
(1) Owa Ooye Jalorun, otherwise known as Owa Ooye Saga	(2) Owa Ooye Imuroko	(3) Owa Ooye Owalosin	(4) Owa Ooye Agbaogo	(5) Owa Ooye Ponyin
(6) Owa Ooye Imoni	(7) Owa Ooye Agbon-jo-laafin	(8) Owa Ooye Agboreledo Osuntaboye	(9) Oloja-Oke Orifioye	(10) Oloja-Oke Korodin
(11) Oloja-Oke Adelekuku	(12) Oloja-Oke Eyinyinloja	(13) Oloja-Oke Oluyode	(14) Oloja-Oke Imoni	(15) Oloja-Oke Oyoyo 'Taban'
(16) Oloja-Oke Akinwumi	(17) Oloja-Oke Adelekan	(18) Oloja-Oke Adeleye	(19) Oloja-Oke Ajitakoto-aje	(20) Oloja-Oke Adejuwonlo
(21) Oloja-Oke Otutu-bi-osun	(22) Oloja-Oke Alubi-osasa	(23) Oloja-Oke Adesunloye	(24) Oloja-Oke Eyebiokin	(25) Oloja-Oke Adeoti
(26) Oloja-Oke Adebiyi	(27) Oloja-Oke Adelakun	(28) Oloja-Oke Akuluju	(29) Oloja-Oke Akere	(30) Oloja-Oke Agbagba
(31) Oloja-Oke Ogbeyeye-ebu	(32) Oloja-Oke Aole	(33) Oloja-Oke Aridan	(34) Oloja-Oke Fasan Alosoija	(35) Oloja-Oke Merunpe
(36) 'Loja Oke Luoye-Arokosewaji	(37) 'Loja Oke Ajetomobi Ooyokun	(38) 'Loja Oke Fabunmi I Gbegbaaje	(39) 'Loja Oke Ladokun Adefenwa Fabunmi II	(40) 'Loja Oke Ademikanlu
(41) 'Loja Oke Ajiboye Ariyowonye Kekere Olajugbe	(42) Owa Ooye Rufus Adenipekun Adegbola Gbegbaaje Fabunmi III (..He resuscitated the Owa Ooye title)	(43) Owa Ooye Richard Oladiipo Makanjuola, Adebiyi II	(44)Owa Ooye Enoch Ademola Akinyemi, Oyoyo II	

== Wars ==
Jalumi war was a precursor to the Kiriji war. Ekitis who wanted dignity, respect, and independence from the hegemony of Ibadan through the unbridled powers of Ibadan political residents (otherwise called Ajeles), formed a coalition to go into war against Ibadan. The formation was as follows:

- Ekiti-under the command of Fabunmi of Oke Mesin, encamped at the foot of Imesi-Ile, near a river, now called Fejeboju.
- Ila – under the command of Prince Adeyala
- Ilorin - under the command of Chief Ajia
- Ijeshas – under the command of Ayimoro and Ogunmodede encamped at Iba

Ekiti coalition moved ammunitions through to Imesi-Ile and first attacked Igbajo, who refused to support the confederates but pledged allegiance to Ibadan. Igbajo called on Ibadan for help and a military commander, headed by Osuntoki was dispatched from Ibadan by Are the Kakanfo. The Ekiti allied forces defeated Ikirun; and Are, the Kakanfo of Ibadan, then dispatched Balogun Ajayi Ogboriefon and Ilori the Osi of Ibadan, against the coalition. As Ibadan soldiers overran Ilorin and pursued them towards Offa through the Otin river, Offa cut off the bridge across Otin river and many Ilorin armies running from the pursuit by Balogun Ogboriefon led Ibadan army, perished in the river. Ilori the Osi of Ibadan who had been taken captive by Ilorin was killed. Prince Adeyala of Ila also died there. After the defeat of Ilorin, Ibadan army led by Balogun Ajayi Ogboriefon was recalled back home and Ibadan army ceased temporarily to fight.

Kiriji War (or Ekiti parapo war): Ki-ri-ji sound was the result of the long-flintlock guns with large muzzles when fired reverberate among several hills in Imesi-Ile. The Ekitiparapos (made up of Ekitis, Ijesas, Efons, Mesin Ipole [Imesi-Ile], Ijebu Ode and other tribes) allied forces against Ibadan were determined to free themselves from the shackles of Ibadan authoritarian. These confederates formed alliance determined to overrun Oyo tribes right to Ibadan farms at river Oba. So they invited Ogedengbe to come and lead them who was initially reluctant because he had sworn never to attack Ibadan since he horned his military training there. But Are rebuffed all his entreaties. So the confederate was headed by Fabunmi of Oke Mesin (now called Okemesi) and were on the match towards Ikirun. Seriki initially led Ibadan army against the confederates and there began the Kiriji war. The confederates retreated to Imesi-Ile via Igbajo whose town was already deserted at the approach of the allied. Ogedengbe later took over the leadership command of the Ekitiparapos at Kiriji in Mesin ipole (Imesi-Ile). On September 23, 1886, all the warring parties except Ilorin soldiers signed the peace settlement but Ekikitparapos still remained, thereafter in Imesi-Ile, to watch Ibadan next move.

Elewure war: Owa Ooye Saga of Imesi-Ile and Owa Jaka of Ilesa were half-brothers from the same father, Olofin of Ife. Both left Ife about the same time to their respective settlements. They had warm and close relationships such that one of the sons of Owa Ooye Saga became the first Lejoka of Ilesa. In 1904, this age long brotherly relationship between the two kingdoms took a sudden negative turn. After the death of Oba Ladokun Fabunmi of Imesi-Ile, there was a contest to the throne between Ademikanlu and Agbemokunro. Owa Bepo was Ilesa king at the time. Ademikanlu sought and got the support of Saraibi Ogedemgbe, a Kiriji war veteran and ally, to have Owa Bepo’s backing rather than seek the support of Imesi-Ile traditional kingmakers, promising him monetary and valuable gains. Working in his favour was also the fact that Agbemokunro refused to join the Kiriji war; against whom the community still held resentment. Several years after he was installed and Ogedengbe’s death, Oba Ademikanlu, refused to honor his promise; to which the Ilesa king kept badgering him. In 1914, Oba Ademikanlu refused to answer one of those numerous mundane calls to Ilesa. Oba Bepo took it as a declaration of war and sent his military against the town. Imesi-Ile, having witnessed the devastating horrors and destructions of the war, deserted town and left their domestic animals behind to take refuge in many of their natural man-caves and jungles. When Ilesa military arrived, they plundered the land (raiding goats) and left with the palace crowns and staff.

== Family units (Agbo ile) ==
Imesi-Ile people have an age long belief in communal efforts and self-help. According to Adekanla, “…Imesi-Ile has grown to become one of the most peaceful communities in the country. The people are patient, long suffering and accommodating yet tough, dignified and highly self-respecting. The societal and ethical standards by which the community judges her own sons and daughters are high and demanding by any standard. Closely-knit and communal, the society has a keen sense of identity and react with vigor and determination to any threats or emergencies internally or externally inspired” All indigenes of Imesi-Ile are recognized by the extended family compound they belong. These are made up of people with similar ancestries. The table below shows these family compounds.

Ako ruling house	Imose ruling house	Ilerio ruling house	Agbo ile Akegun	Agbo ile Olowu (Oke)	Agbo ile Olowu (Odo)	Agbo ile Obanla (Odowo)	Agbo ile Olojudo	Agbo ile Odunmorun	Agbo ile Asaba
Agbo ile Temidire	Agbo ile Osolo	Agbo ile Akerele (Itiwo)	Agbo ile Aro (Itiwo)	Agbo ile Arode	Agbo ile Arode	Agbo ile Orudi	Agbo ile Obe	Agbo ile Otuoko	Agbo ile Loriawo
Agbo ile Oisaba	Agbo ile Aba	Agbo ile olomu	Agbo ile Gbolaasa	Agbo ile Ilerio(Odo ese)	Agbo ile Saade (Tasan)	Agbo ile Osun (Odoba)	Agbo ile Osun (Odowo)	Agbo ile Agbelu	Agbo ile Ejemu
Agbo ile Jadumesi	Agbo ile Ejemu-iwa	Agbo ile Arapate	Agbo ile Oege	Agbo ile Opeforisowo	Agbo ile Obanla (Odoba)	Agbo ile Odofin	Agbo ile Onirangunsin	Agbo ile Obaala(Abolubode)	Agbo ile Obajimo
Agbo ile Lade	Agbo ile Alara(Adubi obi)	Agbo ile Saloro (Ajedun)	Agbo ile Loja-oke	Agbo ile Odole (Oke-iro)	Agbo ile Iroko (Ariyibi)	Agbo ile Alara (Gbogberin)	Agbo ile Asaol	Agbo ile Orisogodo	Agbo ile Inurin
Agbo ile Lerio (ijana-oke)	Agbo ile Oosinkin (Lokunmuyi)	Agbo ile Adigbo	Agbo ile Okile	Agbo ile Lejua Faro	Agbo ile Lejua Ata	Agbo ile Lesogan	Agbo ile Alagbo	Agbo ile Odio	Agbo ile Ojan
Agbo ile Lejua (Oke-iro)	Agbo ile Asigi	Agbo ile Ooro	Agbo ile Lode	Agbo ile Obiun	Agbo ile Lerio imota	Agbo ile Odole (Odobi)	Agbo ile Aworo Oni	Agbo ile Onire	

== Hills and mountains ==
Imesi-Ile is situated on a plateau among several high hills and mountains. It is amazingly easy to hear sounds of human and vehicles late at night and in the morning from surrounding towns as afar as Ilesa, which is about 45kilometers away. Some of the hills are:

Aborigogoro hill	Agogoro hill	Akuro hill	Alaba hill	Aragba hill	Aragbo hill	Aremoge hill	Arije hill	Ataadu hill
Ataarese hill	Ataoja hill	Aye hill	Egun-dudu hill	Elegunre hill	Eregun hill	Gogoru hill	Ifola hill	Imuperon hill
Itasa hill	Oisa hill	Olo hill	Olua hill	Olukoko hill	Omiyeke hill	Oritereu hill	Orogbigbo hill	Orogidi hill

== Caves and crevices ==
Imesi-Ile is one of the many Nigeria untapped treasures open to archaeological discoveries. There are several crevices and man caves which were inhabited by humans in the early centuries; and are still existing till date. These caves are called Agbon by the locals. For instance there is Agbon mosakuku along Igbajo road; Agbon obuntun- it was at this cave many raiders along Okemesi route, who were attacking Imesi-Ile people, after the end of Kiriji war, were trapped. There is Agbon ifa – for fishing expedition. Below are complete list.

Agbon akatakiti	Agbon amoko	Agbon arasagba	Agbon asasa	Agbon ato itoo	Agbon ede	Agbon eye	Agbon eyele
Agbon ifa	Agbon ifola	Agbon imogbe	Agbon inurin	Agbon kurepe	Agbon mosakuku	Agbon obo	Agbon obuntun
Agbon olo	Agbon olorowa	Agbon olua	Agbon ure	Agbon uti			

== Water ==
In the early centuries, Imesi-Ile depended, almost entirely, on spring and stream water, which are broken into two categories. The first category flow directly from the foot of the hill, among rocks and sand. They usually, clear, testy, sparkling, cool and naturally filtered. These are:

Afaekere stream	Agbaogun stream	Agberumi stream	Arioyun stream	Asasa stream	Eleyin stream	Erin-akan stream	Erinfunfun stream
Idi abidun stream	Idi egigun stream	Ifola stream	Ijagba stream	Isun stream	Iwo stream	Iyoro stream	Losulu stream
Ogere stream	Ogungun stream	Omi oba stream	Otin-ewa stream	Sepolo stream			

The second category are streams used mostly for bathing and washing. These are:

Abeokuta stream	Akure stream	Apo olowu stream	Aponkojiya stream	Egudu stream	Iwiibo aponyin stream	Iwo stream	Ogberinla stream
Oguru stream	Olodoo stream	Omidofin stream	Omigbado stream	Onitoki stream	Sakaragba stream		

== Religion ==
Imesi-Ile people are mostly of Christian faith. Many profess to be of Methodist denomination. Other include Christ Apostolic, Cherubim and Seraphim, Roman Catholic, Seventh Day Adventist, Anglican and many other Pentecostal contemporary churches. Some members of the community are Muslims. There are several traditional religionists who profess faith in Egungun, Oro, Ogboni, Agbaogo, Sango, Osun, Esu, Ifa, Ogun and other family deities.

== Education ==
Imesi-Ile was introduced to formal education in 1900 when twelve of her children were registered in school. These twelve pioneers were: (1) William Adesola Ojo (2) Adeoye Ojo (3) Joseph Oluwanifise Fakero (4) Isaiah Oyasoko Adejuwon Babafemi (5) Abraham Olaningbe Falore Makanjuola (6) Martins Ojo Awoyinja Ogunola (7) Benjamin Olaegun Olarewaju (8) Daniel Oke Sabiyi (9) Joseph Oguntomide Ojo Olaogo Ajetomobi (10) Samuel Ola Ajiye Fagbohun (11) Ajayi Orikosungbo and (12) Luke Ojo Olamijulo. The first school was Methodist school which had up to Standard Four. Students who graduated then had to transfer to Ilesa or Oshogbo which had up to Standard Six primary school. In 1938 Methodist school added Standard Five, while in 1939 it was further upgraded to Standard Six. By 1946, Imesi-Ile had, Otapete Methodist School running kindergarten one and two, while Ijana Methodist School had Standard One to Six.

In 1955, after the introduction of universal free primary education by then Western Regional government, Imesi-Ile added Local Authority School I at Omigbo and Local Authority School II at Ijana Odo. In 1956, through the community efforts of Imesi-Ile Progressive Union, Methodist High school, was established. It was later re-named Imesi-Ile High School. Her first principal was Chief Joseph Ilori Bifarin. In 1961, Modern School at Eka was established. It later metamorphosed to Commercial Grammar School. Teachers’ Training College was organized in 1983 and was later re-named Science school in 1992. Several other private schools have since opened in Imesi-Ile to cater to the burgeoning population.

== Economy ==
The primary source of revenue in Imesi-Ile is through agriculture. Her vantage position creates fertile land for all kinds of agric products for yam, cocoyam, cassava, maize and beans. Imesi-Ile is one of the major suppliers of different, best quality, species of yam including eleyintu, ikerikete, aro, efuru, olo, igangan, ogojo, jimokun, alaoko, esinmirin, aga, yinmirin, ilolo, eki, rodoke, elefure, apeepe, motoku, rubielu, morodojo, lasinrin, olojubembe, fele, gbagidari, dagidagi, papauya, efon, ayin, ewura and esuru. The land also produces some of the best vegetables in the country such as ooyo, ebolo, odu, tete, atetedaye, ebure, ogunmo, pobolo, efinrin, worowo, laganran, ajefowo, ewuro, ewurodo, eguku, okan, ogan, and ade. Some members of the community are into black-smithery. They repair agricultural tools and traps used for local hunting. Some men and women engage in weaving traditional cloths. Common among which is awusa, popular in the fifties, which are still used today. Others are, eputu, kente, bobadoroye, popeko, wanga, elejiro, okegbere, alubosa, oremeta, esuku, lakoro, omoirin, obamewa, ala, penidiaro and aleleonikuni. There are local and nationally known artists of Imesi-Ile extraction, but drumming is of important occupations for some residents. Many participate in this trade seasonally, especially during the summer period; but they still retain agriculture as part of their vocation. Popular local drums are gangan, gangan-un, bata, igbo, ibembe, aje, lukoriji, osirigi, agree, sekere, kiriboto and ayuu. In the modern era, there are residents into, masonry, bricklaying, hair and barbing salon, electrical installations, home maintenance and building contractors.

== Medical discovery ==
Dr. David Morley (1923-2009), graduated from Clare College, Cambridge and St. Thomas Hospital in London. After his graduation in 1947, he learnt about health care problems in the developing world during his Military service in Malaysia. He was recruited by the Methodist Mission and sent to Imesi-Ile. Within 5 years he transformed approach to health care of children in the community. In the 8 ½ years of all of 1960s, the average deaths per 1000 new baby born in most parts of Nigeria was between 6 and 12. These maternity deaths were caused by obstructed labor, hemorrhage and eclampsia. Through proper obstetric practice introduced by Dr. Morley in Imesi-Ile. He was able to reduce mortality rate to less than 2 per 1000 births. By 1965, Imesi-Ile became the first community in the world to record the eradication of measles through immunization.

=== Under Fives Clinic ===
In Imesi-Ile, Dr David Morley pioneered “Under-Fives Clinics.” This concept introduced high protein weaning food. Mothers kept their children's records (less loss than for hospital-based records). Grade II Midwives were taught to deal with 90 per cent of clinical needs and to refer the other 10 per cent. He devised the “Road to Health” growth chart. The first measles vaccine was trialled at the Wesley Guild Hospital, Ilesa and Imesi-Ile. It was here, in this ancient town, the community-based health care revolution which is now practiced all over the world began.

== Notable people ==
Notable residents of Imesi-Ile include:

=== Alfred Labinjo (The Marksman) ===
Alfred Labinjo's parents were Kujosin and Ojiropa from the Itiwo compound. He was born around the first half of the nineteenth century. He became a highly successful merchant in Lagos and was very instrumental to the successful prosecution of the Kiriji war. He was one of the major suppliers of military gunpowder, cannonballs, Schnider rifles and cartridges which were routed through Gureje to the Ekiti confederate soldiers. He was one of the founders and leaders of the Rifle Corps. He trained the confederate army the effective use of trench war battle. On July 13, 1885, he was wounded in the Kiriji war and died few days later.

=== Fakuyide Ajakaye ===
Fakuyide Ajakaye was born to the Ale family of Koreti and Owolude in Odowo, around 1860. He was an active participant in the Kiriji war and was very good with swords. After the war, he became a successful trader. He loved to be gorgeously dressed. He had several wives and created one of the largest families in Imesi-Ile. It was in his compound that he first received Christian missionaries who came to Imesi-Ile to spread the gospel; and allowed two of his children to receive formal education. He became the Obaala in 1922. He was a well-respected personality through his selfless service to the community. He died on August 10, 1942.

=== Oginni Familusi ===
Oginni Familusi was born around the middle of nineteenth century. His parents were Lokunsoro and Orisatikun of the Akegun family of Ijana. He had the Chieftaincy title of Akegun during the Kiriji war. An honest and virtuous man; and a political adviser to the King. During the Ita-Idominasi and Imesi-Ile road constructions, he played big community leadership role. He donated food to laborers who worked during Osun Iponda bridge construction. He died on August 14, 1936.

=== Imesi-Ile Warriors ===
The vantage position of imesi-Ile placed it at a constant theater of many of Yoruba wars. Imesi-Ile produced many warriors of the wars. According to Olabisi Adekanla, “Prominent among them were Gbasi, Ogunmokunwa and Olowuro, all of Odo Ese, Adekanla of Ijana and Asao of Odobi. Labinjo of Itiwo was a major supplier of imported breach loading guns and leader and trainer of the rifle corps; Balogun Osejin, Oni, his brother, Beegun, Eso Esudina, Ayilumo, Subiaro, Oniro, and Fagbolu, alias Looponda, all from Ile Lejua Ekunfe of Oke-Iro. Other were Awowale and Ogunwole from Ile Aworo-Okun, Apata and Opiliki from Ile olomu; Kayaoja, Ogedengbe’s trumpeter, Lasilola, Jiga, Alonge, Ojo, Ajayi and Adegbite, all from Okuagbonrin otherwise known as Ile Sango. Also, from Ile Obe were Famoye, Alagbe, Akerele, Sasolarin, Sitekun and Famugbode. Others included Lamijulo, (Gbain Obi soogun), from Ile Aba, Funamogbo Iyaya and Odun from Ile Gbolasa. There were also Fabode and Ogunkunle from Fabode’s house, Fatodu and Bada from Ile Sagunrin, Obaala Ogbudu from Ile Obaala Ogan, Anigbedu Farotimi Aborode, Ako, Agbati and Igbagba from Ile Odunmorun. Also from Ile Osun and Odofin were Laogun Ipaye, Ogunpolu, Oba Ijagba, Odofin Jobioloye, Otejimi and Oye. Asika P’olu Egbe, Ogunkola, Tifase, Ajakaye, Otun, Laarade Orisan, Ariwodola and Labinjo were all from Itiwo. Dawodu Ajakaye, Ogun Idagiri (Ogedengbe’s Ipaye) were from Ile Asaba: Idagun, Ode and Tenigbokun from Ile Olowu. Others were Faseyitan of Ile Fakola and Olukanmi of Ile Ajana both of Orudi, Fakiyesi, Faniyan, Ogan Ibule, Owoyomi (Atagbon k’eru o bolode) all of Ile Ejemua, Fajimi (A ruku saya diidi) and Yesoka (Aruku’s ibembe drummer) both of Ile Osolo. There also were Orogbangba, Kumolu-Ayena, the dexterous sword man of Ile Olojudo. Other were Eti Ologbo-Olumo-Oluo of Ile Alagbo; Sabiyi Abolude (Imogun), Lalemi (Ile titun), Fasumi Aaga bodi, Erinmo Ile Oro all of Ile Sabi. The rest were from Odoba. They were Omitogun of Ile Sabi, Aworo Osun of Ile Osun, Itasanmi and Ajasa of Ile Erintiku, Obaoro baba Okin of Ile Odio, Saode and Oreegun of Ile iroko.”

=== William Adesola Ojo ===
William Adesola Ojo was born around 1885, to the family of Obaala Ajakaye and Madam Ayegbiyan, he was one of the first set to receive Primary education in Imesi-Ile. He later graduated from Tinubu Weslayan Elementary school and was employed to the position of signaler at the Nigerian Railway in 1913. He resigned fifteen years later to return to Imesi-Ile to serve his people. He was the first to introduce science into farming which he named Wasimi Garden. He was appointed Imesi-Ile native judge and later, as councilor for Ijesa Native Authority Council. He actively supervised Ita-Idominasi and Imesi-Ile road construction in the early 1930s also Imesi-Ile and Okemesi road in the late 1940s. he died on March 18, 1958.

=== Abraham Olanimgbe Makanjuola ===
Abraham Makanjuola was born to Prince Falore of the Ilerio Royal family of Ijana, in the late nineteenth century. He worked briefly at Nigeria Railways but later went into banking where he grew to become the Director at the Barclays bank. He was one of the founders of Imesi-Ile Progressive Union. He built blocks of classrooms at Methodist High School (which was later named Imesi-Ile High School) to meet government requirements. He financed the construction of Ilare and Imesi-Ile road project. He played major role in the restoration of the beaded crown to Imesi-Ile. He was the Otun Owa until 1979 when he died.

=== Luke Tewogbola Olamijulo ===
Luke Tewogbola Olamijulo was born in the late nineteenth century into the family of Owarungba of Ile Aba compound. He was one of the first set to receive primary education at Imesi-Ile Primary School in 1900. He proceeded later to Wesley College, Ibadan. He was a teacher for many years before venturing into business. He was an important contributor to social, political landscape in Imesi-Ile community. One of the founders of Imesi-Ile Progressive Union, he later joined to set up Ijesa Northern District Council and became its first chairman. He won a seat into the Nigeria legislative Upper Chamber as the first senator from Ijesaland.

=== Philip Fayese Familusi ===
His father was Akegun Oginni Familusi. Although they did not receive formal education, he acquired Yoruba literacy. An intelligent man who chronicled and archived all historical events including families and churches with astounding accuracy. He taught himself sewing and became the leader of Imesi-Ile Tailors’ Association. Familusi quickly recognized importance of education and would ensure parents enrolled their children in school. He would not permit children of school age to farm, instead he sent them to attend school; many of those children later became important personalities in life.

=== Joshua Olaoye Fakolade ===
Joshua Olaoye Fakolade was born around the early twentieth century. His parents were Fakolade and Bosede of the Modeowu family of Ijana. He was a certified preacher and steward of the Methodist Church of Nigeria. He was a member of Imesi-Ile Progressive Union disciplinary Committee for many years. For many years, he chaired Imesi-Ile Health Committee and Obafemi Awolowo University Teaching Hospital. He died in 1994.

=== Joseph Adeola Olaniyan ===
Joseph Adeola Olaniyan was born in 1925 into the family of Pa and Dorcas Olaniyan of Ile Aba and Ile Ejemuwa compounds. He had his primary education at Methodist School, Imesi-Ile. He attended Government College, Ibadan in 1941 after which he proceeded to England to obtain Bachelor of Science in Engineering. He came back to Nigeria to set up his engineering company. An Imesi-Ile patriot and philanthropist who served his people with passion and vigor. He died on November 11, 1982.

=== Oluwole Siyanbola ===
Hon. Oluwole Siyanbola was born in May 1933 into the Otuoko family of Okerena. His parents were, James Ojo Siyanbola (Arogba) and Madam Susannah Ajayi Siyanbola. He received his primary education at Methodist School between 1939 and 1947. He obtained his Bachelor of Science degree in Geography from University College, Ibadan. He was a teacher at Okitipupa Methodist High School and later returned to Imesi-Ile High school to succeed Chief J.I. Bifarin as the school Principal. He later joined politics and was elected to Oyo State legislature until 1983 when the military overtook the government. He was a philosopher, disciplinarian, orator, loved by his people. He died on November 29, 1992.

=== David Ojo Abiodun Oguntoye ===
David Ojo Abiodun Oguntoye was born in 1914, to the family of Pa Alo Oguntoye of Ile Olomu and Madam Badejoko Kilanpon Oguntoye of Ilerio ruling house. He graduated Grade II teacher and taught in many schools outside Imesi-Ile until he became Headmaster. During the World war II, he joined the British Royal Air Force. After the war, he studied law and was called to English Bar in 1948. He returned to Nigeria to set up his private legal practice. He was a councilor representing Imesi-Ile at Kiriji Local Government Council between 1954 and 1956. He became the Grade A Customary Court Judge for the Western region in 1958. He was highly respected by his people. In 1968, he was installed Loogun Legiri of Imesi-Ile. He died June 18, 1997.

=== Isola Fabunmi (Orara L’Ada) ===
Isola Fabunmi was born in 1849. He was of the royal family to the throne at Okemesi (formerly Imesi Igbodo). He received training in tailoring from his father, Prince Adesoye. For much of 1860s, he lived in Ibadan with Akintola, the second son of Balogun Ibikunle of Ibadan. He was a war boy who took part in Iperu and Mamu war campaigns. He later returned to Okemesi and was involved in several local raids.
