= Remi Adedeji =

Nigerian writer for children

- Born: 1937 (age 88–89); Okemesi, Southern Region, British Nigeria (now in Ekiti State, Nigeria)
- Occupation: Children's writer

Remi Aduke Adedeji (born 1937) is a Nigerian writer for children.

== Biography ==
Adedeji was born in Okemesi in Ekiti State in 1937. Adedeji was disappointed with books for children because they did not reflect African culture. Many of her stories are based on Nigerian folk tales. She wrote and published The fat woman in 1973. She has become an associate editor for the academic journal, Bookbird. Her books frequently involve a tortoise character. Her 1986 book of "Moonlight Stories" involves a number of Just-so stories which explains why vultures are bald or why the tortoise's shell appears cracked.

== Works ==
- The fat woman, 1973.
- Papa Ojo and his family, 1973.
- It is time for stories, 1973.
- Four stories about the tortoise, 1973.
- Stories my mother told me, 1978.
- Tunde's birthday party, 1983.
- Tunde visits Ibadan, 1983.
- Tunde's first day at school, 1983.
- Moonlight stories: how the tortoise married the king's daughter and other stories, 1986.
- Dear uncle, 1986.
