= Aare Latoosa of Ibadan =

Yoruba general, warlord, and chief

Mohammed Obadoke Latoosa
- Ààrẹ̀ Ọ̀nà Kakanfò
- Reign: October 3, 1871 – 1885
- Predecessor: Òjó Aburúmákùú of Ògbómọ̀ṣọ́ (Son of Tóyèéjẹ)
- Aare Ona Kakanfo: Samuel Ladoke Akintola
- Born: Ọbadọ́kè Látóòṣà Ọyátóòṣà "Ìyàndá Asúbíaró" c. 1820s Ilora, Oyo Empire
- Died: 1885
- Spouses: Osunbunmi; Ibeji; Moriola
- Issue: Sanusi Aare; Akinola Aare; (Baale) Shitu Aare; Bello Aare; Bakare Aare; Amodu Aare; Mustafa Lateju Aare; Atiku Aare; Oyewo Aare; Ashiru Aare; Olaniyan Aare; Musa Aare; Suberu Aare; Haruna Aare; Yahaya Aare; Shaibu Aare; Yakub Aare; Raji Oyeleye Aare; Raji Ajao Aare; Sanni Aare; Sadiku Aare
- Father: Ore-òrìṣà Ọyátóòṣà
- Mother: Ọyátóókí
- Occupation: Palmwine tapper, hunter, Warlord, chief, farmer, and Military ruler

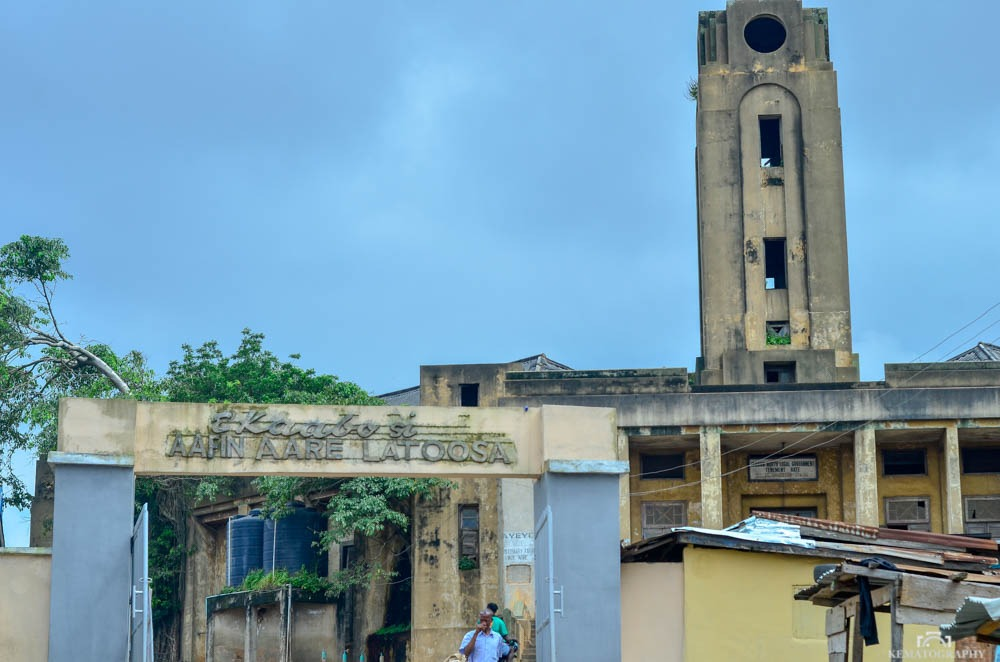
The Palace of Aare Latoosa in Ibadan

Obadoke Latoosa Oyatoosa (c. 1820s – 1885), but more commonly referred to as Latoosa (or Latosisa), and later Mohammed Obadoke Latoosa, was a Yoruba general, warlord, and chief who was the Aare Ona Kakanfo of the Oyo Empire, the ruler of the Ibadan Republic, and the commander and leader of the Western forces of Ibadan during the Kiriji War from 1877 to his death in 1885.

On arrival in Ibadan, Latoosa joined Ogunmola's private army and soon became the captain of his guards. On October 3, 1871, Latoosa was installed Aare Ona Kakanfo and ruler of Ibadan. Originally from Ilora, not far from today's Oyo.

Obadoke Latoosa (or Latosisa) of Ibadan, the 12th Kakanfo. He is worthy of mention because he was the Kakanfo in office when again, several parts of Yorubaland were at war — the Kiriji War, said to be the longest civil war in global history, and was fought for 16 years from 1877 to 1893. He was also the last military Kakanfo, being succeeded by an honorary holder, Samuel Ladoke Akintola.

For a long time, some say as much as 16 years, Latoosa remained childless, despite sacrifices and propitiations to the gods of the land. Due to the growing influence of Ilorin, whose new Emir, Abd Salaam had sacked the capital of Old Oyo Empire at Katunga, Latoosa opted for the Islamic faith, and took the name Mohammed, inflected in Yoruba pronunciation as Momodu, and became fully known as Momodu Obadoke Latoosa. Shortly after, his wife birthed a son which he named Sanusi, believing that his childlessness ended because of his new faith. Many historical accounts concur that Latoosa, actually usurped the title of his predecessor, Ojo Aburumaku, who later became Soun of Ogbomoso.

When the rulership of Ibadan fell vacant following the self-exile of Balogun Ajobo, and the death of Baale Orowusi, Latoosa and Ajayi Ogboriefon were the most senior chief left. Latoosa claimed that he could not rule with the title of Baale; and opted to be the ruler of Ibadan with the title of Aare Ona Kakanfo. He thus became the Aare. In his view, the titles of Basorun and Baale were of lower ranks that brave soldiers should not take. He was a popular ruler; never afraid of war.

As the successor state to Oyo Empire, Ibadan under the rule of generals called the shots, and appointed administrators for vassal states and towns. These administrators were called Ajeles. Many of the Ajeles ruled with high-handedness, and in Oke-Imesi, in today's Ekiti State, one Ajele forcefully had carnal knowledge of a woman who was returning from the farm. The woman turned out to be the wife of an Oke-Imesi prince, Fabunmi. The defiled woman, in tears, narrated her ordeal to her husband, and infuriated, Fabunmi drew his sword, marched to the Ajele's quarters, and beheaded him and his guards. Those of the Ajele's entourage that survived the carnage wrought by Fabunmi fled for their lives, and returned to Ibadan, where they reported happenings to the Kakanfo, Latoosa. The Kakanfo saw reported developments at Oke-Imesi as an affront on his authority and declared war on the offenders, but he had underestimated the resolve of all states and towns that had Ajeles to repudiate them. Oke-Mesi, being Ekiti, sought the help of their ethnic kith and kin in Ijesaland, a famous general called Ogedengbe Agbogungboro, rallied warriors from Ekitiland and Ijesaland into a coalition of forces known as the Ekiti Parapo, jointly commanded by Ogedengbe and Fabunmi. Thus, in 1877, the series of battles that would later be known as Kiriji Wars began, and lasted for 16 years. It is said to be the longest civil war in global history. That is not all about the mystiques surrounding Kakanfo Momodu Obadoke Latoosa, Asubiaro Agadagudu.

He is on record as the ruler that put an end to the inhuman treatment of slaves in Yorubaland when he decisively dealt with a renowned slave dealer and women leader, Efunsetan Aniwura. This story has been romanticised in movies, and is the subject of a Yoruba novel by Emeritus Professor, Akinwunmi Isola of the University of Ibadan. In 1885, while the Kiriji War was still on and the Europeans were in Berlin at a conference later known to history as the Scramble for Africa, Latoosa met his end in an unexpected way.

He had a slave whom he loved a lot, and allowed the rights of a freeborn. Being under the protection of the Kakanfo, this slave took liberties beyond his rights, and was frequently reported to Latoosa who however continued to indulge him. On an occasion, the slave insulted one of Latoosa's generals, Balogun Osungbekun. Osungbekun chastised the slave, and according to some reports, had him whipped. The slave reported his ordeal to Latoosa, who summoned Osungbekun before him and demanded why he should treat his slave that way. Osungbekun, angered that a general like him could be asked to state his side of a case involving a slave, drew his sword and beheaded the slave. Other generals were present, and arrayed themselves on Osungbekun's side. Latoosa saw his error of judgement, and turned, entered his chambers, and took poison.

He was said to be a friendly person who would greet people with a smile, but he could also be obstinate and sometimes cruel; like the typical Kakanfo, especially the likes of Kurunmi and Afonja.

== Early life ==
Born in the small village of Ilora near Oyo, he was a palm tree farmer before rising to prominence as a leader during the early history of Ibadan. He was trained as a warrior in Bashorun Ogunmola's private army from where he led detachments of Ibadan soldiers on military expeditions, such as the Ijaye War and campaigns against the Ekiti people. His first military title was Aare-Ago, and later rose to be the head chief of Ibadan. He was feared throughout the region of Yorubaland. His continued exploitation of Ekiti towns sparked the Kiriji War. He had over 22 sons and numerous daughters.

Latoosa's prominence and significance in Ibadan exist till this day, with his rule as Aare Ona Kakanfo featuring in the Oriki of the town of Ibadan, and he is also known as the last Aare Ona Kakanfo to fight in a war. The position was abolished under Colonial Nigeria, and was not bestowed for another 80 years until August 1964, when Samuel Ladoke Akintola was appointed as the Aare Ona Kakanfo, a clear contrast from previous Aare, including Latoosa.
