= Igbajo =

Town in Osun State

Igbajo is a town in the southwest of Nigeria, in the Boluwaduro Local Government Area in Osun State. Igbajo was founded in the 12th century. As of 2015 it had a population of 25,117. The majority of people in Igbajo are ethnically Yoruba.

It neighbors the cities of Iresi, Ìlá Òràngún, Okemesi, Ada, Iree, Otan-Aiyegbaju, Otan-Ile, Imesi-Ile, Edemosi and Oyan. It is located 199 mi or (321 km) southwest of Abuja, the capital of Nigeria.

Igbajo has 10 village farm settlements which includes: Aragba, Edi-Araromi, Peete, Aiyetoro, Ajegunle, Osoro-Odoka, Kajola, 'Budo Kiriji and Oke Budo.

The Kiriji War, a 16-year-long civil war between the subethnic kingdoms of the Yoruba people, ended in Igbajo. The first secondary school in the region, Kiriji Memorial College, was named in remembrance of the peace treaty.

Africa's first community owned, managed and funded Polytechnic, the Igbajo Polytechnic was founded in Igbajo in 2005.

== Tourism ==
12 important places to visit in Igbajo include :

1. Okuta Mewa

Okuta Mewa (Ten Rocks) was the spot where those, who later founded different towns, paused during the journey from Ile-Ife. Each of them sat on one rock, hence the name Okuta Mewa (Ten Rocks) to symbolize the event. They sat, discussed, and later dispersed to different directions and locations where they are today.

Igbajo was the only town in history where ten kings had a stop-over on the top of rock before they dispersed and went to establish their respective towns and communities. The kings included the Orangun of Ila; Ajero of Ijero-Ekiti; Alara of Aramoko; Owa of Otan Ayegbaju; Olojudo of Ido-Ekiti; Owalare of Ilare; Onire of Ire-Ekiti; Oloore of Otun-Ekiti and the Owa of Igbajo.

2. Kiriji War Site

Kiriji War site is located about seven kilometers to the town. Some of the interesting locations at the site are:

Faragbota Tree: Faragbota tree was said to have absorbed thousands of bullets and it is still stands erected on its spot.

Fejewe Stream: Fejewe stream turned to blood following large-scale killings that occurred during the war. The surviving warriors did not have a choice other than to bathe with the polluted water. That was how the name stuck.

The Aare Latosa War Camp: Aare Latosa War Camp was the command post of the commander of the Ibadan Army Aare Ona-Kakanfo, the most skilled, experienced, and senior general in Alaafin's army. He died at the camp located in Igbajo.

3. Igbajo Public Library

Established in 1968 through communal efforts.

4. Ile Oyinbo

Situated at Oluju Hill beside Esile Shrine, the District Officer (DO) lived in the fame Ile Oyinbo. The monument housed the Radio-Vision Infrastructure for Igbajo from 1959 to 1963. IDA is committed to the restoration of the monument.

5. Igbajo Health Center Green Park

The green parks at the Igbajo Health Center are nurtured by Chief (Mrs) Yetunde Oyewole. The green part covers more than 15 acres of land and it spreads from the wards to the residential areas of the health facility.

6. Elenyina Mountain This is the highest point of the chains of hills that surround Igbajo. It is about 5,000 meters above sea level and maintain about 5 kilometers from Igbajo Township along Koro road.

7. Igbajo Polytechnic

Established as one of the private Polytechnics in Nigeria in 2005, Igbajo Polytechnic was Africas first community-owned and managed higher institution. It has both an FM station and a TV channel.

8. Victoria Park & Garden

Victoria Parks and Garden is the largest park and garden in Igbajoland. It covers over 15 acres of land with very rare economic trees. It has various facilities for both young and adult leisure.

9. Kiriji College Brook

The Kiriji Memorial College famous brook and micro-dam is a great destination because visitors to the brook must descend 39 concrete steps to get to the stream. The brook served as the main source of water supply for students who lived in the college hostel when the boarding system was in place.

10. Oja-Olua and Orogun Meji

Among the physical features of Igbajo, there are some mysterious stones along Oke Edi route. There are Oja-Olua and Orogun Meji and three long snakes. Oja-Olua is the long wrapper-like tie (IGBAJA) in the form of rock at Oriba. Orogun Meji is the two stones resembling two women presumed to be wives of one man in the olden days turned to stone after a quarrel.

11. Oroke Shrine

Oroke Shrine hosts the annual Oroke Festival holding in May. The festival brings together the ruling houses with a view to celebrating their progenitors by killing a cow which is shared among them under a lively atmosphere.

Members of the royal families are accompanied to the shrine by drummers who spice up the occasion with music and panegyrics in a spectacle that provokes nostalgia of Igbajo of old.

12. Tungba FM

Located at the former Nitel transmission building, Eyidin hill, Tungba FM is Igbajo's premier radio station. Privately held by Prince Gbolahan Odo, Tungba 90.3 FM is an entertainment station with a focus on the cultural renaissance of Yoruba tradition and history.

== History ==
Igbajo comes from the root word gbajo, as in Agbajo Eniyan meaning “assembly of people”. It is said to have been founded in 300 CE by a prince of Yorubaland who was a son of Oduduwa, the progenitor of the Yoruba. It is well known as being the theater of the Kiriji War (also known as the Ekiti–Parapo War) of the late 1800s.

Igbajo is said to have been the meeting place of ten monarchs as they traveled to found their respective kingdoms. Before departing they erected ten still-extant stone markers to commemorate their meeting. The kings included the Ọ̀ràngún of Ila, the Ajero of Ijero-Ekiti, the Alara of Aramoko, the Owa of Otan Ayegbaju, the Olojudo of Ido-Ekiti, the Owalare of Ilare, the Onire of Ire-Ekiti, the Oloore of Otun-Ekiti and the Owa of Igbajo.

The monarchs of Igbajo are known by the title of Owa of Igbajo. Oba Olufemi Fasade became the last Owa in 1990. He died in December 2020 at the age of 81.

Short story of Igbajo by a native

== Economy ==
The inhabitants engage in a mix of professions. Farming thrives because the land is fertile. Igbajo has a quarry industry that mines precious stones. Tourist destinations include Eleyinla Mountain, Obalara, Oluajo, Aruka, Oke Agere, old ile Oyinbo and Okuta-Mewa at Ija-Oke.

The people prosper in the timber and plank business in Sanngo, a district in Ibadan to which they migrated thanks to their friendly relationship with Ibadan people.

== Historical sites ==
=== Faragbota Tree Relics ===
The Faragbota tree is rumored to have protected the Igbajo and Ibadan armies during war by absorbing bullets from their adversaries when they hid behind it.

=== Aare Latosa War Camp ===
The Aare Latosa War Camp was the command post of the commander of the Ibadan Army Aare Ona-Kakanfo, the most skilled, experienced and senior general in Alaafin's army. He died at the camp located in Igbajo. As a result, the coronation rites of Aare Ona-Kakanfo were conducted in Igbajo. The present Aare Ona-Kakanfo is Chief Gani Adams.

=== Peace Treaty Site ===
On this site the warring factions signed a treaty that ended 400 years of war within the Yoruba Nation. The treaty was signed on 23 September 1886. It was facilitated by British emissaries and made symbolic by inserting the signed agreement into a bottle and then burying it. The words of the agreement were further inscribed in stone.
