= Baba Adinni =

Baba Adinni is a Yoruba chiefly title. It is often conferred by local obas in Nigeria's Yorubaland region, usually to Muslim men who have contributed to society or government in some fashion.

== List of Baba Adinni of Lagos ==
- Pa Arunmonikun from (1841-1891)
- Mohammed Shitta Bey (1891-1895)
- Pa Yesufu Alufa Shitta-Bey (1895-1911)
- Pa Apatira (1911)
- Pa Tiamiyu Savage (Bashorun Olowogbowo) (1911-1919)
- Imam Adam Ali Fayati (1919-1924)
- Imam Abass Opere (1924-1937)
- Pa Bombata And Pa Akinyemi (up to 1967)
- Alhaji Waheed Elias (1967-1976)
- Alhaji Wahab Iyanda Folawiyo (1976-2008).
- Abdul Hafeez A. Abou (2008-2024
- Alhaji Sikiru Alabi-Macfoy (2024- till date)

== See also ==
- Oba (ruler)
- Nigerian traditional rulers
