= North Riding of Yorkshire Constabulary =

Defunct police force of North Yorkshire, England

The North Riding of Yorkshire Constabulary was the territorial police force for the North Riding of Yorkshire from 1856 to 1968.

Formed in 1856 as a result of the County and Borough Police Act 1856 it covered all of the North Riding except for the boroughs of Middlesbrough, Richmond and Scarborough, which had their own Borough Constabularies.

Initially the force consisted of a Chief Constable, Captain Thomas Hill, and 50 men.

In 1968, the North Riding Constabulary was amalgamated with York City Police and the East Riding of Yorkshire Constabulary to form the York and North-East Yorkshire Police.

Chief Constables

- 1856–1898 : Captain Thomas Hill
- 1898–1927 : Major Sir Robert Lister Bower, CMG, KBE (except 1914–16)
- ?1927–1956 : Lt-Col. John Clevaux Chaytor, DSO, MC
- 1956–1968 : Harold Hubert Salisbury
