= Ogedengbe of Ilesa =

Yoruba chief and warrior in Yorubaland

Ògèdèngbé Agbógungbórò
- Obanla of Ilesa
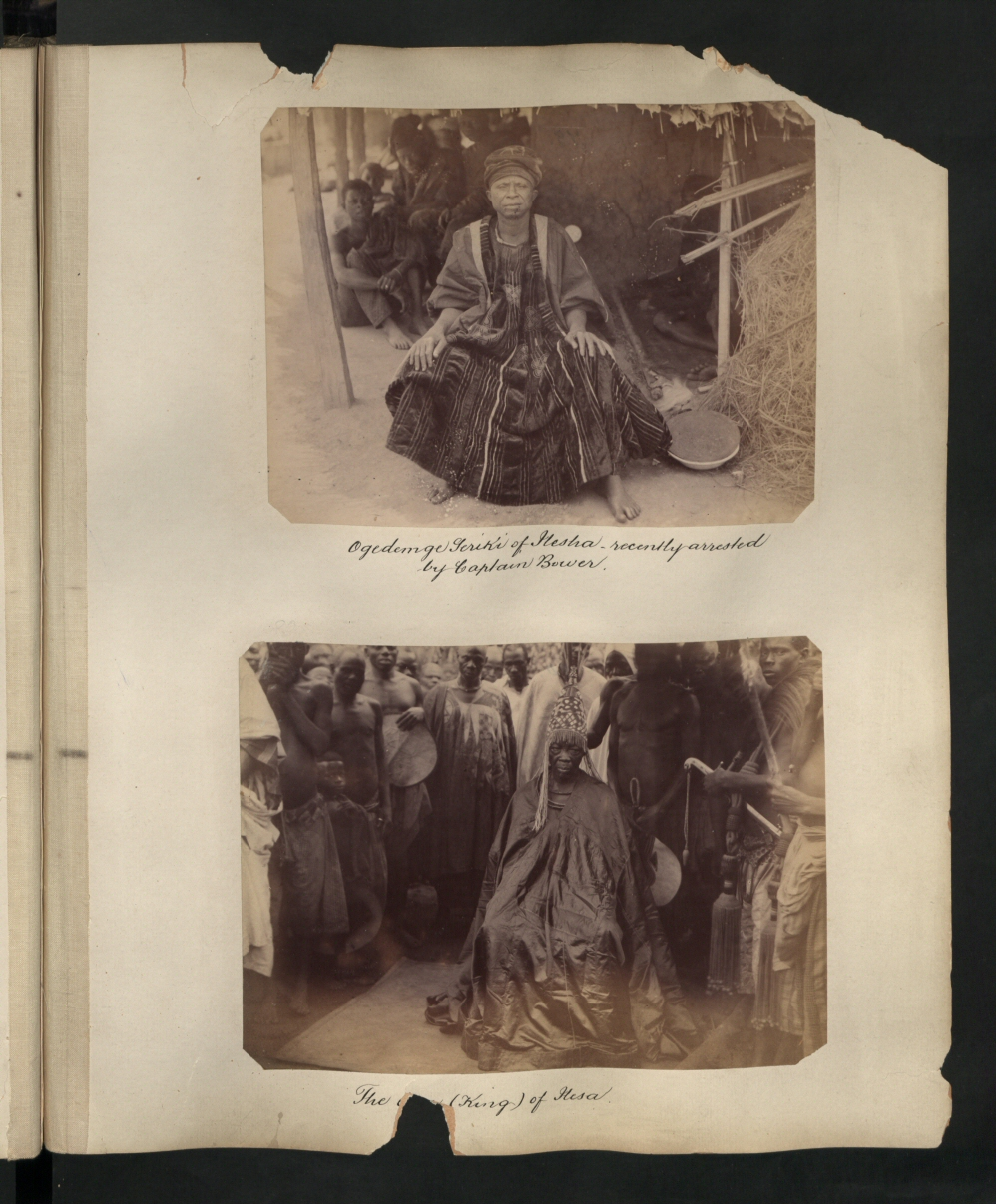
- Ogedengbe in 1894

Obanla of Ilesa
- Reign: 1898 - July 29, 1910
- Successor: Chief Ogunmoyesin Ogedengbe II; Chief Stephen Olusesan Ogedengbe III; Chief. Dr. Oyekanmi Ogedengbe IV: Obanla of Ilesa (Grandson of Ogedengbe) (2005-)
- Born: Òrìṣàràyíbí Ògúndàmọ́lá; 1822; Atorin, Ilesa
- Died: 29 July 1910 (age 88); Ilesa, Southern Nigeria Protectorate
- Father: Apasan Borijiwa
- Mother: Juola Orisatomi (or Falupo)
- Occupation: Warrior and Agriculturist
- Military career
- Allegiance: Ilesa
- Rank: Seriki
- Conflicts: Kiriji War

Ogedengbe of Ilesa (1822-July 29, 1910; born Òrìṣàráyíbí Ògúndàmọ́lá) also known as Sàráíbí Agbógungbórò, Ògèdèngbé Agbógungbórò , or Ògèdèngbé Agbógun Gbórò was a Yoruba chief and warrior in Yorubaland, part of present-day Nigeria, who served as the Seriki (commander-in-chief) during the Kiriji War (1877–1893) against Ibadan.

== Early life ==
He was born Òrìṣàráyíbí Ògúndàmọ́lá to Apasan Borijiwa and Falupo in the small village of Atorin near Ilesha, in August or September in 1822. According to oral tradition, a babalawo in 1822 predicted that a boy would be born on "Isegun Day" and liberate the Ijesa people from foreign domination. His mother died during his birth. Ogendengbe was also born near the annual Ogun Festival, which is traditionally held in the months of August or September. Ogedengbe was the only boy who was born on that day. His parents were worshippers of the Ìṣẹ̀ṣe religion. His first name Òrìṣàráyíbí Ògúndamọlá means the orisha provided this (the child) to be born. Orisa in names is often short for "Òrìṣàlá," a name for the god Obatala, so it may also mean "Obatala has provided this child to be born." Ògúndàmọ́lá means Ogun adds to wealth. His mother was from the town of Atorin, where he was born, while his father was from the village of Oke-Orisa, which is also near the town of Ilesa. He was nicknamed Ogendengbe as a child, a Yoruba onomatoepic name originating from his unique fighting style which involved lifting enemies up above his head. He was later given the name Agbógungbọ́rọ̀ after his time in war, meaning "one who craves war as festivals.

== Life as a Warrior ==
In 1864, he was captured while defending Ilara-Mokin against Ibadan. He escaped after receiving training from the Ibadan warrior Bada Aki-Iko. He was captured again during the Igbajo War of 1867 but also escaped again. These two incidents trained him in military strategy. When an Ijesa chief named Odole Ariysasunle allegedly leaked military secrets to Ibadan, Ogedengbe led his warriors to chase him out of Ilesha, and he became a hero. In 1878, Ogedengbe attacked Idoani. He was only able to crush Idoani and return to Itaogbolu, later in 1879 after he lost several of his army at the battle.

After the start of the Kiriji War, the army of the Ekiti-Parapo confederacy was formed in 1878 to lead an attack against Ibadan. Ogendengbe had settled at the town of Igbara-oke and planned a trip to the Kingdom of Benin in 1878. Ogedengbe cancelled his trip to the Kingdom of Benin to lead the army at the request of war leaders, despite his initial reluctance. When Ogedengbe arrived at the base, he was greeted with cheers and ovations, and Prince Fabunmi voluntarily stepped down for Ogedengbe. During the war, he helped liberate northeastern Yoruba districts from the domination of Ibadan. After the 1886 treaty, he retreated with his troops to Imesi village until a conflict between Ibadan and Ilorin occurred in 1893. His band of warriors participated in the raiding of local farms and civilians, which resulted in a warning from Captain Robert Lister Bower of the British Army, who served as the Resident of Ibadan and political officer of Lagos Colony.

In 1894, Captain Bower arrested Ogedengbe and imprisoned him in Ibadan. When the authorities of Ilesha protested against the location of his imprisonment, he was transferred to Iwo. After some consultations, the British colonial governor of Lagos Colony, Gilbert Thomas Carter, freed Ogedengbe when the Owa of Ilesa Fredrick Kúmókụn Adédeji Haastrup paid a fine of 6,000 British pounds for his release.

== Later life ==
In 1898, Ogedengbe was granted the chieftaincy title Obanla or Obala, meaning "Mighty King," to honour his performance during the Kiriji War, after he repeatedly declined the offer to become Owa Obokun, or king, of Ilesha. He died on July 29, 1910, at around the age of 88 years old. He was succeeded by his son as the Obala of Ilesa, and his descendants currently serve as the Obala & the Alatorin, or king of Atorin (his hometown). The colonial government of Nigeria commissioned a sculpture named the Ogedengbe Staff in 1934 to commemorate him, and it was placed outside Owa's Palace at Ilesa. Locations in modern-day Ilesa are named after him, such as Ogedengbe Memorial School.

== Sources ==
- Akinyẹle, Isaac Babalola; Morgan, Kẹmi (1900). Akinyẹle's Outline History of Ibadan. Vol. 3. Caxton Press (West Africa).
- Adeniji, B. F. (1998). "Ogedengbe: An Ijesha warrior in the 19th century". In Akinjogbin, Adeagbo; Akinjogbin, I. A. (eds.). War and Peace in Yorubaland, 1793–1893. Nigeria: Heinemann Educational Books. pp. 173–180. ISBN 9789781294976. OCLC 47727947.
- Peel, John David Yeadon; Morgan, Kẹmi (2003). Religious Encounter and the Making of the Yoruba. Vol. 3. Indiana University Press.
- Akintoye, S.A. (1971). Revolution and Power Politics in Yorubaland 1840–1893. USA: Humanities Press Inc. pp. 77–106.
