= Robert Lister Bower =

Major Sir Robert Lister Bower KBE CMG KPM

Chief Constable of the North Riding of Yorkshire Constabulary
- In office 1898 – 13 June 1929

Personal details
- Born: 12 August 1860
- Died: 13 June 1929 (aged 68)

Major Sir Robert Lister Bower KBE CMG KPM (12 August 1860 – 13 June 1929) was a British Army, colonial and police officer who served as the Chief Constable of the North Riding of Yorkshire Constabulary from 1898 until his death in 1929.

== Biography ==
Bower came from an old Yorkshire family. His father was Robert Hartley Bower of Welham Hall, Malton and his mother was a daughter of Sir John Lister-Kaye, 2nd Baronet of Denby Grange. In 1874, Bower went to Harrow School in 1874. He was later commissioned into the Kerry Militia, from where he transferred to the King's Royal Rifle Corps in 1881. He served in the Anglo-Egyptian War and fought at Tel-el-Mahuta, Kassassin and Tel-el-Kebir.

In 1884, he served in the Mahdist War, fighting at El Teb and Tamai, where he was mentioned in dispatches, and in the Nile Expedition of 1884–1885, being mentioned in dispatches twice more. In 1892, he served with the Jebu expedition in West Africa. From 1892 to 1893 he was a Political Officer at Jebu Ode. From 1893 to 1897 he was British Resident at Ibadan, Nigeria, where he captured and arrested the Yoruba warrior Ogedengbe of Ilesa. For these services he was appointed a Companion of the Order of St Michael and St George (CMG) in the 1897 New Year Honours.

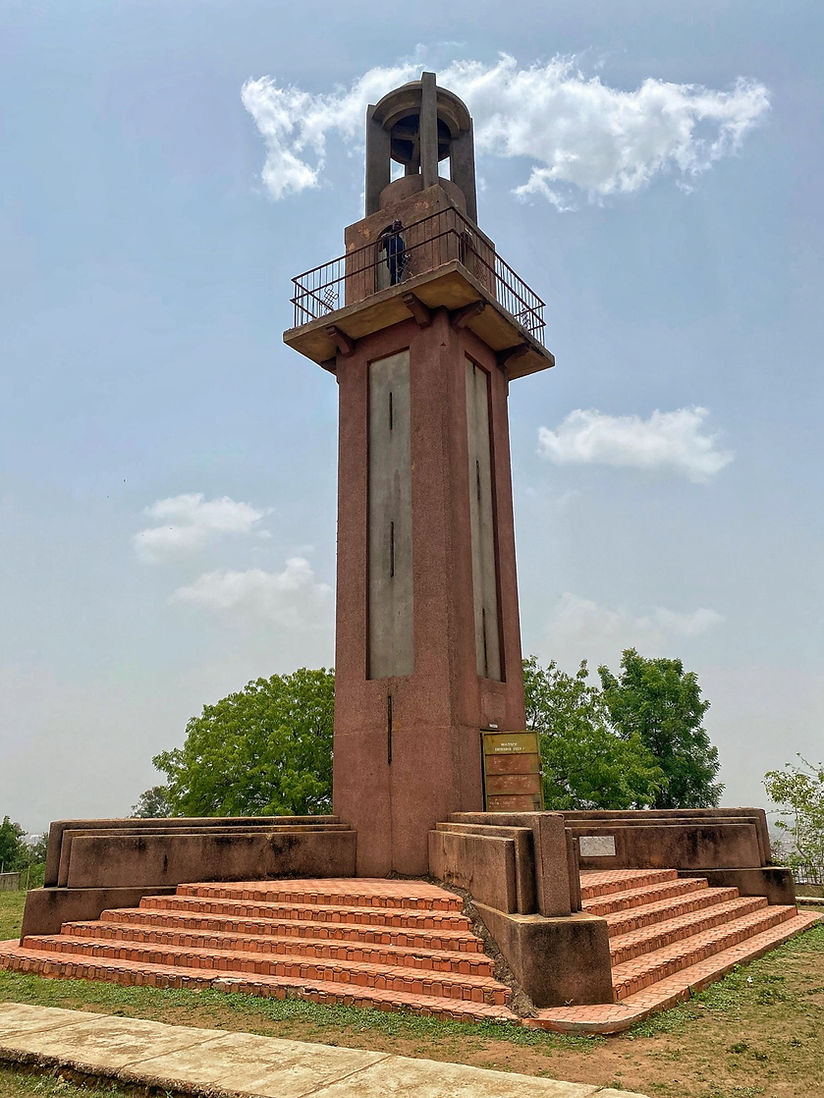
Bower's Tower honours Captain Bower, who served as British Resident of Ibadan between 1893 and 1897

In 1898, he was appointed Chief Constable of the North Riding of Yorkshire. He served in this role until his death, with a break in 1914–1916 when he returned to the Army as Deputy Assistant Adjutant-General in Egypt. In 1920, he was appointed Commander of the Order of the British Empire (CBE) in the civilian war honours and was promoted to Knight Commander (KBE) in the 1925 Birthday Honours.

In 1929, Bower died suddenly from heart failure brought on by pneumonia.
