= John Otonba Payne =

Nigerian administrator and diarist (1839–1906)

Omoba Otonba Payne
- Born: John Augustus Otonba Payne; 1839; Sierra Leone
- Died: 1906 (aged 66–67); Lagos, Southern Nigeria Protectorate (modern-day Nigeria)
- Cause of death: Murder
- Occupation: Sheriff

John Augustus Otonba Payne (1839 – 1906) was a Nigerian sheriff, administrator and diarist who was a prominent personality in Lagos during the nineteenth century. He was a Chief Registrar of the Supreme Court of Lagos and he also served as a registrar in various colonial departments such as the Police Court, the Chief Magistrate's Court, the Court of Civil and Criminal Justice and the Petty Debt Court. He produced an annual West African and Lagos Almanac which published some historical notes. He was also the convener of a forum called the Society for the Propagation of Religious Education.

== Life ==
Payne was born in 1839 in Kissy Village, Sierra Leone. His father was from a royal house in Ijebu Ode. He was a close friend of James Johnson , a prominent clergyman, and was a layman and warden at the Cathedral Church of Christ, Lagos. He also counselled the Awujale of Ijebuland to allow Christian missionaries. Through his influence, a Christian preacher was allowed to preach in Ago Iwoye.

Payne was also noted for his writings in his annual almanac. One of his entries includes that of the court appearance of ex-Oba Dosunmu, who had been subpoenaed. Payne was charged with administering the solemn oath through an interpreter.

== Death ==
Payne was murdered in his residence in Lagos by an unknown assailant in 1906. His murder was never solved.

== See also ==
- List of unsolved murders (1900–1979)
