= Okemesi =

Okemesi Òkèmẹ̀sí, Òkèmẹ̀sí-Èkìtì
- semi-urban
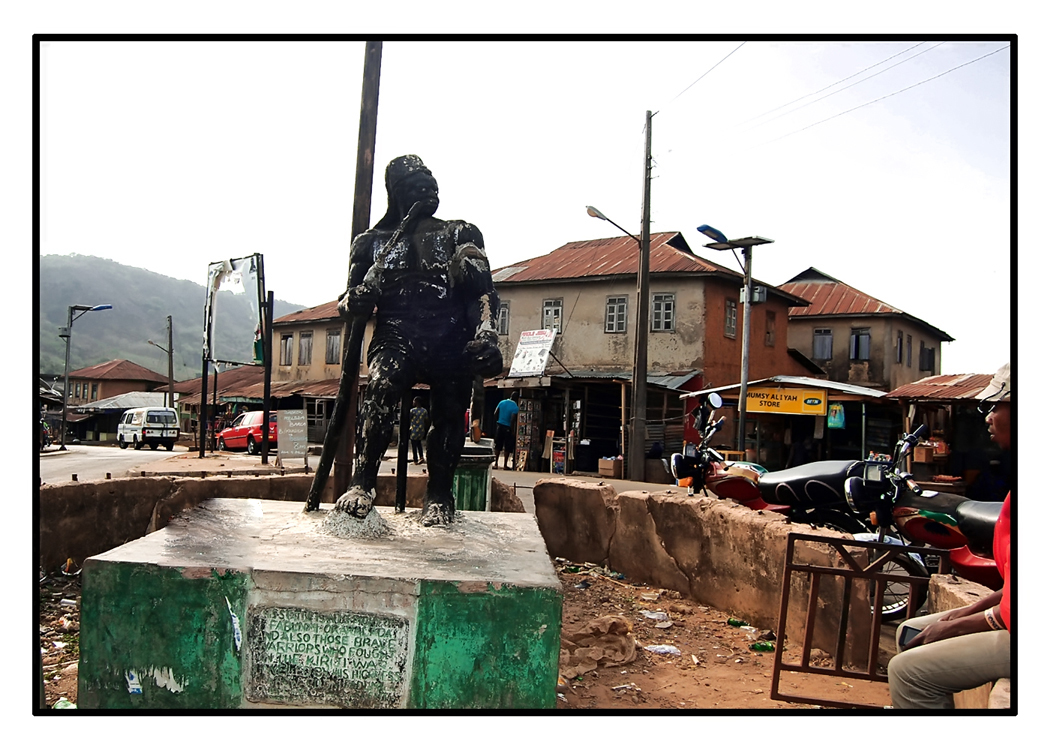

- Location in Nigeria
- Country: Nigeria
- State: Ekiti
- LGA: Ekiti West

Government
  - Ọwá Oòyè: Oba Michael Gbadebo Adedeji, Ariyowonye II

Area
  - Total: 32 km^{2} (12 sq mi)

Population
  - Estimate (2006): 56,000
- Time zone: UTC+1 (WAT)
- Climate: Tropical savanna climate (Aw)

Okemesi-Ekiti is in Ekiti West Local Government and also the Headquarters of Okemesi/Idoile Local Council Development Area LCDA of Ekiti State, Nigeria, whose headquarters is the Ekiti town of Okemesi. Its population according to 2006 population census is 56,000 residents.

== Geography ==
Okemesi-Ekiti is in the South-West of Nigeria, located within the tropical hinter-land in the rain forest area. It is located on latitude 7.82° North and longitude 4.92° East and an altitude of about 541 meters above mean sea level. Okemesi is bounded on the East by Ikoro-Ekiti and Ijero, on the South of Efon Alaaye, on the North of Imesi-ile and on the West by Esa-Oke both in Osun State. The town lies between two ridges running approximately north - south which cojoin close to the northern boundary and form the east and west limits of the undulating valley and low lands that make Okemesi. The unique terrain creates a scenic view of great tourism potential and value as well as provides below average temperatures during the cooler harmattan season. The low lands are rich in fertile soils which are good for agriculture, while the ridges are rich in quartzites and other minerals of economic value.

== History ==
Okemesi Ekiti originated from Ife, the ancient and ancestral home of the entire Yoruba race. Ooye-lagbo, the founder of the town, was the eldest daughter of Olofin, the last king on the line of Oduduwa, whom is regarded as the father of the Yoruba. She was the eldest sister of Ajibogun founder of the town of Ilesa. They were of the same mother, by name, Seputu.

When the children of Olofin were to leave Ile-Ife in their sojourns to found their own kingdoms, their father, Olofin, told them to share his royal paraphernalia and properties consisting crowns and their deities among themselves. Ooye -Lagbo being the eldest daughter and the princess who knew more about the royal treasures and the secret of these deities, was the one tasked with sharing the patrimony. She gave them a crown each. She understandably chose the best of the crowns for herself together with one AJASE sword and some other local orisha of the Yoruba religion; such as: Obalufon, Oduduwa, and Ogun. These deities, or orisha, are regarded as deified ancestors of the Yoruba race. Olofin, himself, was afterwards also deified and is worshiped up till today in Oke-Mesi and other Ekiti towns like Ilara-Mokin.

Okemesi Ekiti is renowned for her deep historical connection with Ekiti and Ijesha Kingdoms and their people in general.

Okemesi is most famous for being the hometown of the prince, Fabunmi of Okemesi, whom was a warrior and a leader of the Ekiti-parapo forces in Kiriji War.

The current king of the town is HRM Oba Michael Gbadebo Adedeji CON Ariyowonye II. He is one of the 16 highest ranking kings of Ekiti, whom make up the council known as the Pelupelu.

== Cultural Festivals ==
- Egungun (Oladunwo and Paraka) Festival- April/May
- Ehinle Festival - October
- Olokun Festival
- Ose Festival - June
- Oke Agbonna Festival -December
- Oro Festival - 4th day after Egungun festival
- Orisa odo ese Festival- April/May
- Ekiti Parapo Remembrance Day - October
- Ogun festival - 3rd Week of December
- Omo owa 'dowo- September

== Notable people ==
- Prince Fabunmi of Okemesi, a warrior and a leader of the Ekiti-parapo forces in Kiriji War.
- The children's writer Remi Adedeji was born here in 1937.
- Kola Ogunmola, famous Yoruba playwright, was born here in 1925
- Adebiyi Daramola, Nigerian academic (1958–2022)
- Benjamin Oluwakayode Osuntokun, Researcher and Neurologist (1935 - 1995)
- Jimoh Aliu, Nigerian dramatist, sculptor, film writer, playwright and director (1939 - 2020)
