= Ipetu-Ijesa =

Ipetu-Ijesa Ipetu Ipetu-Aro Odo
- Town
- Nickname: Ipetu Aro
- Motto: Aro Odo Agbe a o
- Interactive map of Ipetu-Ijesa
- Coordinates: 7.466°N 4.890°E
- Country: Nigeria
- State: Osun State
- Local Government: Oriade

Government
  - Ajalaye of Ipetu-Ijesa: Agunbiade III
- Elevation: 700 m (2,300 ft)

Population (1975)
  - Total: 16,123
- Time zone: UTC+1 (WAT)
- Postal code: 233120

Ipetu-Ijesa, also called Ipetu-Aro Odo among its inhabitants, is a city in Oriade local government area, Osun State, Nigeria. It is located in the western part of Nigeria, about 40 km from Ile-Ife and 37 km from Akure (capital of Ondo State). It is one of the biggest cities in Ijesa North Federal Constituency, comprising Oriade and Obokun Local Governments. The people are of the Yoruba ethnic group, and the title of the traditional king of Ipetu-Ijesa is Ajalaye of Ipetu-Ijesa.

The area borders various cities and towns, including parts of Ijebu-Jesa, Erinmo, Erin-Ijesa, Erin-Oke, Ipo Arakeji Ijesa, Ikeji-Ile, Ira-Ikeji, Omo-Ijesa and Ile Oluji.

The women of Ipetu-Ijesa are renowned for their mat weaving skills. The mats are made from a local long fibrous grass called "Eni Uran" in the local dialect. The men are mostly farmers.

== List of Kings ==
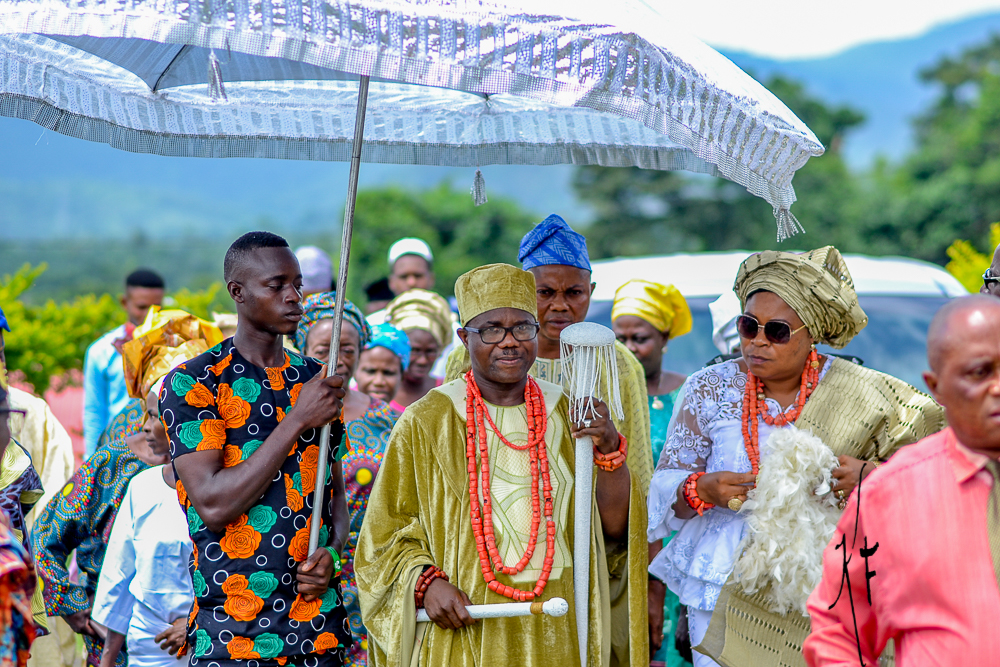
Oba Samson Adeleke Agunbiade III.

These are the Kings that reigned in the land according to the royal record:

1. Owa Olabidanre reigned in Ipetu-Apoti from 1178 to 1253.
2. Settlement and occupation of Ipetu-Orodi from 1253 to 1442.
3. Apetu Adebolajo reigned in Ipetu-Oropa from 1442 to 1507.
4. Apetu Omilana Arugbabuwo reigned in Ipetu-Oropa from 1507 to 1560.
5. Apetu Okudipoogun Otutubiosun reigned in Ipetu-Oropa from 1560 to 1593.
6. Apetu Ofara reigned in Ipetu-Aro Odo from 1593 to 1628.
7. Apetu Adejimintano reigned in Ipetu-Aro Odo from 1628 to 1669.
8. Apetu Ogburugbonni-leroriodi reigned in Ipetu-Aro Odo from 1669 to 1705.
9. Apetu Otutunite Ajisola reigned in Ipetu-Aro Odo from 1705 to 1753.
10. Apetu Alagbadu Otulogbo reigned in Ipetu-Aro Odo from 1753 to 1789.
11. Apetu Agunbiade "The first of his name" reigned in Ipetu-Aro-odo from 1789 to 1813.
12. Apetu Ogbagbalawo reigned in Ipetu-Aro Odo from 1813 to 1841.
13. Apetu Afinbiokin "The first of his name" reigned in Ipetu-Aro Odo from 1841 to 1879.
14. Ajalaye Okirikisi reigned in Ipetu-Elefosan from 1879 to 1885.
15. Ajalaye Ariyeloye, "the first of his name", reigned in Ipetu-Elefosan from 1885 to 1916.
16. Ajalaye Osuntuyi Oginni reigned in Ipetu-Elefosan from 1916 to 1927.
17. Ajalaye Afinbiokin, "the second of his name", reigned in Ipetu-Elefosan from 1927 to 1932.
18. Ajalaye Alelamole Ariyeloye, "the second of his name", reigned in Ipetu-Elefosan from 1932 to 1950.
19. Ajalaye Oke Agunbiade, "the second of his name", reigned in Ipetu-Elefosan from 1950 to 1972.
20. Ajalaye Adekunle Baderin Afinbiokin, "the third of his name", reigned in Ipetu-Ijesa from 1976 to 2016.
21. Ajalaye Samson Adeleke Agunbiade, "the third of his name", has reigned in Ipetu-Aro Odo from 2018 until date.

== History ==
The origin of Ipetu-Ijesa, like the earliest history of most other world societies, is shrouded in mystery but can be constructed through oral tradition. The first official history of Ipetu-Ijesa was compiled by the Ipetu Improvement Union (or IMU) in response to the order of the then Divisional Officer, who wanted to find out the roots of the incessant fighting between the Ìjeṣàs. This attempt was very short and was printed as a pamphlet. However, a major work was done by one of the sons of the land, Mr. J.O. Ogunjulugbe, in his outstanding book The History of Ipetu-Ijesa, which was first published in 1975. The short history written in this article is adapted from this book.

Ipetu-Ijesa was founded some centuries ago. It was first settled when Ọlọ́fin, the son of Odùduwà, left Ilé-Ifẹ̀ (the cradle of the Yorùbás) with his children and grandchildren and travelled in the direction of the ‘Ìjámọ̀’ forest – a big forest between Ìjẹ̀bú, Ilé-Ifẹ̀ and Oǹdó. Among the children who travelled with him were Èsemọ̀wẹ́, Àwùjalè, Ọba Àdó, Gbógun, Egúnrin, Àsùrìndó, Ọlábídànrè and Ọ̀dúnwo-Ògbólú. Èsemọ̀wẹ́ was a daughter of Ọlọ́fin, while Egúnrin was a son. Àsùrìndó was the father of Ọlábídànrè, who is the founder of Ìpètu. The name Ìpètu or Àpètu has nothing to do with Etu (antelope). The detractors of Ipetu Aro Odo encouraged that assumption to become Ipetu's history for the purpose of exploitation, especially at the time of Igbó Àjìkà's conflicts.

Ìpetu got her name from an unusual incident which happened when the children of Olofin were still proceeding on the march of migration and founding towns. There were two hunters who accompanied Ọlọ́fin and his retinue from Ilé-Ifẹ̀ to the Ìjámọ̀ forest. The names of these hunters were ‘Ìja’ and ‘Ògún’. Ìja was a path tracker who was very versed in the knowledge of the paths in the forest. It was these two men who escorted Ọlọ́fin and his people to where they sojourned. Hence the reference to ‘Igbó Ìjámọ̀’ (the forest that Ìja knew). Here, the children of Ọlọ́fin started to disperse. The Àwùjalẹ̀ left for Ìjẹ̀búland. Ọlọ́fin and the rest of his children went further until they came to a place called ‘Ẹpẹ’. It was there that Èsemọ̀wẹ́ and her husband left the party for Airo and later went further to found Oǹdó. Ọlọ́fin went further still and settled at Ọta-Ìpẹ̀tẹ́ near Ilẹ̀-Olújìí. According to traditional historians, the Ilẹ̀-Olújìí people were Ọlọ́fin's gate-keepers (or “Ẹ̀kù”, which means door). They are still known by this name today.

Between the present Ile Oluji and the present Ipetu, the Ẹ̀kùs were aggrieved against Àsùrìndó, the father of Ọlábídànrè. Ọlábídànrè had allegedly sacrificed three Ẹ̀kùs to a god. As a result of this, the Ẹ̀kùs decided to kill Ọlábídànrè as revenge. One day, they found Ọlábídànrè in a house alone without his father Àsùrìndó. They surrounded the house and set it on fire. They were certain that the end of Ọlábídànrè had come, he would either be burnt with the house or he would try to escape and fall into their hands. His father Àsùrìndó was alerted of his son's danger. He quickly sent Egúnrin and Ọdunwò-Ògbólú to go and rescue his son. This was a very difficult task that was physically impossible, so the two men resorted to using supernatural means and utilized a traditional incantation called Àpètu. As they chanted the incantation, Ọlábídànrè was ejected from the house without the Ẹ̀kùs seeing him and landed at the place where his father was. From that day, he was referred to as Àpètu, meaning the one that was called and ejected out of danger with incantations.

This soon became his family name, so much so that all his children were called by it. As a consequence of this incident, the life of Ọlábídànrè was no longer safe among the Ẹ̀kùs. For this reason, Ọlọ́fin had to give him a number of people and instruct him to go and settle somewhere else between Ọta-Ìpẹ̀tẹ and a place where there were three Akòko trees near the River Ọ̀ni.

Ọlọ́fin was somehow conscious of the settlement of the Ẹ́rìn people on the other side of the River Ọ̀ni. After Ọlábídànrè - now sìmply known as Àpètu - left Ọta-Ìpẹ̀tẹ, Gbógun, one of the members of the team founded Ọ̀rọ́ta (which is today known as Ìdànrè). Ọ̀dúnwo-Ògbólú went on to found Ẹ̀fọ̀n-Aláayè, while Ọba-Àdó went and founded Benin. The other children of Ọlọ́fin stayed with Gbógun without founding new settlements.

Apetu and his people first settled at Ìpotì after leaving Ọta-Ìpẹ̀tẹ. He gave various titles to his followers for the purposes of effective administration. These titles were carbon copies of those given at Ọta-Ìpẹ̀tẹ: Rísà, Ọ̀dọ̀fin, Ẹjẹmu, Àró, Ẹlẹ́mọ, Asába, Ọ̀dọlọ́fin, Ọ̀dọlé, Asàmọ, Lóóyìn, Lógurò and so on. Most of the Ọlọ́fin's descendants bear these chieftaincy titles in their respective places of settlement. After leaving Ọta-Ìpẹ̀tẹ and Ìpotì, Àpètu and his people settled at Oródì, where they planted many kolanut trees. This forest where they planted kolanut trees is now known as “Igbó-Àjìkà” (i.e. Àjìkà's forest). Up until the present time, somewhere inside the forest is the rock that served as the boundary between Gbógun, the Ọwá of Ìdànrè and Àpètu. The name of this rock is “Ọta Ìpinun” (Rock of Decision). Here Ọlábídànrè died and was succeeded by his son, Ọba Adébọ́lájọ Òsípàtẹàkún. The names of the subsequent kings are listed above in their order of reigns.

It is worthy of mention to note that only the Ìgandò people had the sole right to the throne of Àpètu. Later, after the people were well settled, some people came to settle with Ìpetu people at their present location; these people were sent to a place called Òkè-Ọwá. The reigning king asked his son to be the overlord of the place and report only the cases beyond his control to him. As from that time forward, all the male children of a king born on the throne would be sent to Òkè-Ọwá. As a result, selection of a new king is done from either Ìgandò or Òkè-Ọwá.

The town has been known in history by various names such as Ìpetu-Àpótí, Ìpetu-Ọrọ́pa, Ìpetu-Eléfòsán, Ìpetu-Àrò Odò and recently some notable indigenes are advocating a change of name to the town's original name Ìpetu-Àjàláyé. This is based on their observation (which has empirical evidence) that Ipetu has less of an affinity with the Ijesa people but more with Ìdànrè/Oǹdó/Èkìtì people. Ipetu-Ijesa was a creation of the late Reverend Olabode in the early 20th century. When he wanted to give a name to St Paul's Anglican Church, he referred to it as St. Paul's Anglican Church Ipetu-Ijesa to fit into a political grouping. This action changed the fortune and the history of Ipetu . It led to the town's numerous conflicts with Ilesa people on Igbó Àjìkà, which is the inheritance of all Ipetu citizens. For the oral tradition, the most valuable sources are based in the palace, the chiefly houses and the priestly houses. As may be expected, accounts from such sources often differ in several important particulars.

As the Yoruba people were professional farmers, the need for productive lands might have arisen. It might have been the cause of their initial migration to the Ijamo forest, which was suitable for agriculture. This reason could not easily be disapproved because it was contained in part of the tradition existing amongst the royal bards.

== Major attractions ==
Tourist sites in the area include Oluminrin Waterfalls, also known as Erin Ijesha Waterfalls, and a mat weaving market.

== Education ==
The College of Education of the Osun State University is located in Ipetu-Ijesa. The location of the university in the town boosts its economy.

In honour of one of the sons of the town, Air Chief Marshal Oluseyi Petinrin - who was a senior Nigerian Air Force officer and one-time Chief of the Defence Staff, the federal government created an air force school.

Osun College of Management Science (formerly Ipetu-Ijesa College of Technology) is another notable higher institution in the town of Ipetu-Ijesa.

== Religion ==
Islam and Christianity are the dominant religions practised in Ipetu-Ijesa, with the majority of the inhabitants being Christians. St Paul's Cathedral, which houses the Bishop's throne of Ijesa North East Diocese (Church of Nigeria) Ipetu-Ijesa, is the town's oldest place of worship. It was established in 1897, when Christianity first came into the town. In recent years, the town has also seen a rise in other dominations of Christianity especially the Evangelicals like the Redeemed Christian Church of God, Foursquare Gospel Church and several others.

== Cultural festivals ==
Ipetu-Ijesa is popular for its annual flogging competition (Opa festival). Other notable festivals in the town are the Eleworo festival and the Olotoporo masquerade festival, both of these festivals have declined in their promise because of the influence of evangelical Christianity in the late 20th century.

== Notable people ==
- Oba (Barr.) Samson Adeleke Oke, Agunbiade III: The Ajalaye of Ipetu-Ijesa (traditional ruler)
- Prof. Hezekiah Oluwasanmi: Founding member of the University of Ife, now Obafemi Awolowo University (OAU), Ile-Ife, and second Vice-Chancellor of the institution (1966 - 1975).
- Air Chief Marshal Oluseyi Petinrin (rtd): Former Chief of Air Staff (2008 – 2010) and Chief of Defence Staff (2010 - 2012)
- Rotarian Banji Olatona: Politician and Proprietor of Banjolat Friendship Academy, the first private secondary school in Ipetu-Ijesa
- Chief Oyekunle Oluwasanmi (Late): Former Minister of State for Power and Steel (1997).
- Prof. Mudasiru Olalere Yusuf: Senior lecturer, Department of Educational Technology, University of Ilorin
- Hon. Rufus Oluwatayo: Member, House of Representative for Obokun/Oriade Federal Constituency (1999 - 2003)
- Mr. J.O. Ogunjulugbe: Historian and the author of The History of Ipetu-Ijesa.
- Alhaji Zikrullah Olakunle Hassan: A lawyer and the former Chairman of the National Hajj Commission of Nigeria (NAHCON) (2019 - 2023).
- Engineer Francis Ilesanmi: CEO Matparson Oil and Gas.
- Barrister M.B.O Ibraheem: A Lagos-based lawyer and former member of Osun State House of Assembly.
