= Tunde Eso =

Nigerian politician

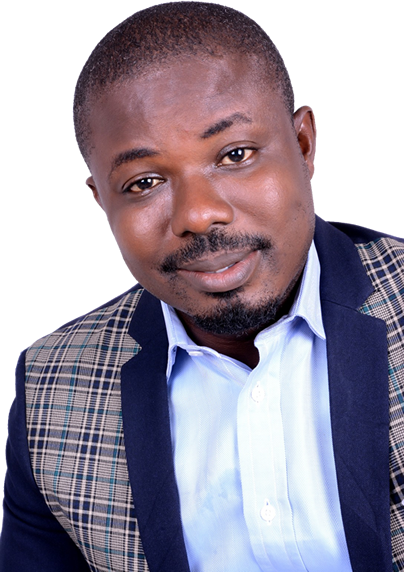
- Born: Tunde Eso; 16 August 1977 (age 49); Ilesa, Osun State, Nigeria
- Education: Osun State College of Technology, Esa-Oke; University of Education, Winneba, Ghana
- Occupations: Blogger, businessman, lecturer; journalist
- Website: tundeeso.com

Tunde Eso (born 16 August 1977) was a Nigerian journalist, social commentator, public relations specialist, and publisher of Findout Newspaper. He was a 2018 PDP aspirant for Governor of Osun State⁣⁣. Eso was the founder of Youthocracy, a proposed system of government. He was the president and founder of a social movement called Fix Nigeria Group, which he founded with the aim of restoring Nigeria to its former glories. In his lifetime, Tunde authored a number of books, including African Security Solution and Vision for Africa.

== Early life and education ==
Eso was born and raised in Ilesha, Osun State, to the family of Pa Obafemi and Iyabode Eso (née Fanibe) on 16 August 1977. He studied accountancy for his National Diploma certificate at Osun State College of Technology, Esa-Oke, in 2005. He obtained his bachelor of science degree in Political Science at University of Education, Winneba, Ghana.

== Political views ==
In an interview with the Nigerian ⁣⁣Guardian newspaper, Eso said the old generation of politicians would continue to sideline Nigerian youth until the youths realize that they constitute the most significant number of voters. He opined that the numerical strength [8of the children is enough to pick and select one of the young Nigerians with pragmatic programmes. In Eso's opinion, Nigerian youths have been neglected by past administrations. He also believes that it is time to build leaders with the right thoughts and actions, leaders who will not fight for their pockets only, leaders who will think of others and not themselves alone. In his opinion, the integration of young people in politics is needed to solve Nigeria's insecurity problems.

== Youthocracy ==
In 2013, Eso coined a new system of government called "youthocracy," which he defined as 'Government of the people, by the youth, and for the people" in his book titled Vision for Africa. [14][15]. He explains that his motive is to provide political opportunities to youths so they can be relevant in Nigerian politics, hence the need to identify with Youthocracy, which is set to take over from democracy, according to his interview with The Nation.
