= Jaiyede Afro =

Studio album by Orlando Julius with the Heliocentrics
- Released: 9 September 2014
- Studio: Quartermass Sound Lab
- Length: 51:46
- Label: Strut
- Producer: Malcolm Catto; Jake Ferguson

Jaiyede Afro is a collaborative studio album by Nigerian musician Orlando Julius and English band the Heliocentrics. It was released on 9 September 2014 through Strut Records. It peaked at number 13 on the Billboard World Albums chart. It received generally favorable reviews from critics.

== Background ==
Orlando Julius' studio album, Super Afro Soul (1966), was re-released in 2000 through British record label Strut Records. Strut Records then invited him to team up with the Heliocentrics. The Heliocentrics had released collaborative albums with other artists Mulatu Astatke and Lloyd Miller. Jaiyede Afro was recorded at the Heliocentrics' studio in North London.

== Critical reception ==
Professional ratings
Aggregate scores
Source	Rating
Metacritic	80/100
Review scores
Source	Rating
AllMusic	3.5/5 stars
Exclaim!	8/10
The Guardian	4/5 stars
MusicOMH	4/5 stars
PopMatters	8/10
Record Collector	4/5 stars

According to the review aggregator Metacritic, Jaiyede Afro received "generally favorable reviews" based on a weighted average score of 80 out of 100 from 8 critic scores.

David Maine of PopMatters called the album "a meaty, high-energy gumbo that is compulsively danceable, but also complex to immerse oneself in and simply listen to." Paul Bowler of Record Collector stated, "Aided and abetted by some magnificent backing by the Helios, using the requisite analog set up, the album has the verve and feel of a classic West African long-player, but with enough subtle updates to prevent a slide into reverent pastiche." Matt Bauer of Exclaim! commented that "Jaiyede Afro is not only a welcome return for Orlando Julius but also an excellent primer for newcomers."

=== Accolades ===
Year-end lists for Jaiyede Afro
Publication	List	Rank	Ref.
MusicOMH	Top 100 Albums of 2014	77	

== Track listing ==
All tracks are written by Orlando Julius Ekemode and the Heliocentrics, except "In the Middle" by Alfred Ellis and Bud Hobgood.

Jaiyede Afro track listing
No.	Title	Length
1.	"Buje Buje"	8:21
2.	"Love Thy Neighbour"	4:18
3.	"Aseni"	5:18
4.	"Sangodele"	4:32
5.	"Jaiyede Afro"	6:06
6.	"Omo Oba Blues"	3:52
7.	"Be Counted"	11:16
8.	"In the Middle"	4:52
9.	"Alafia"	3:11
Total length:		51:46

== Personnel ==
Credits adapted from liner notes.

Musicians

- Orlando Julius – tenor saxophone, vocals, percussion, additional organ
- Malcolm Catto – drums, percussion, additional organ
- Jake Ferguson – bass guitar, additional guitar
- Adrian Owusu – guitar
- Jack Yglesias – conga
- Ollie Parfitt – organ
- Latoya Aduke – backing vocals
- Jason Yarde – baritone saxophone
- Matt Roberts – trumpet
- Abdul Raheem – trombone
- Phil Dawson – 2nd guitar
- Luzmira Zerpa – additional backing vocals

Technical personnel

- Malcolm Catto – production, recording, mixing
- Jake Ferguson – production, recording, mixing
- Guy Davie – mastering
- Lewis Heriz – artwork
- Matt Thame – graphic design
- Alexis Maryon – photography

== Charts ==
Chart performance for Jaiyede Afro
Chart (2014)	Peak position
US World Albums (Billboard)	13
