= Orlando Julius =

Nigerian singer and saxophonist (1943–2022)

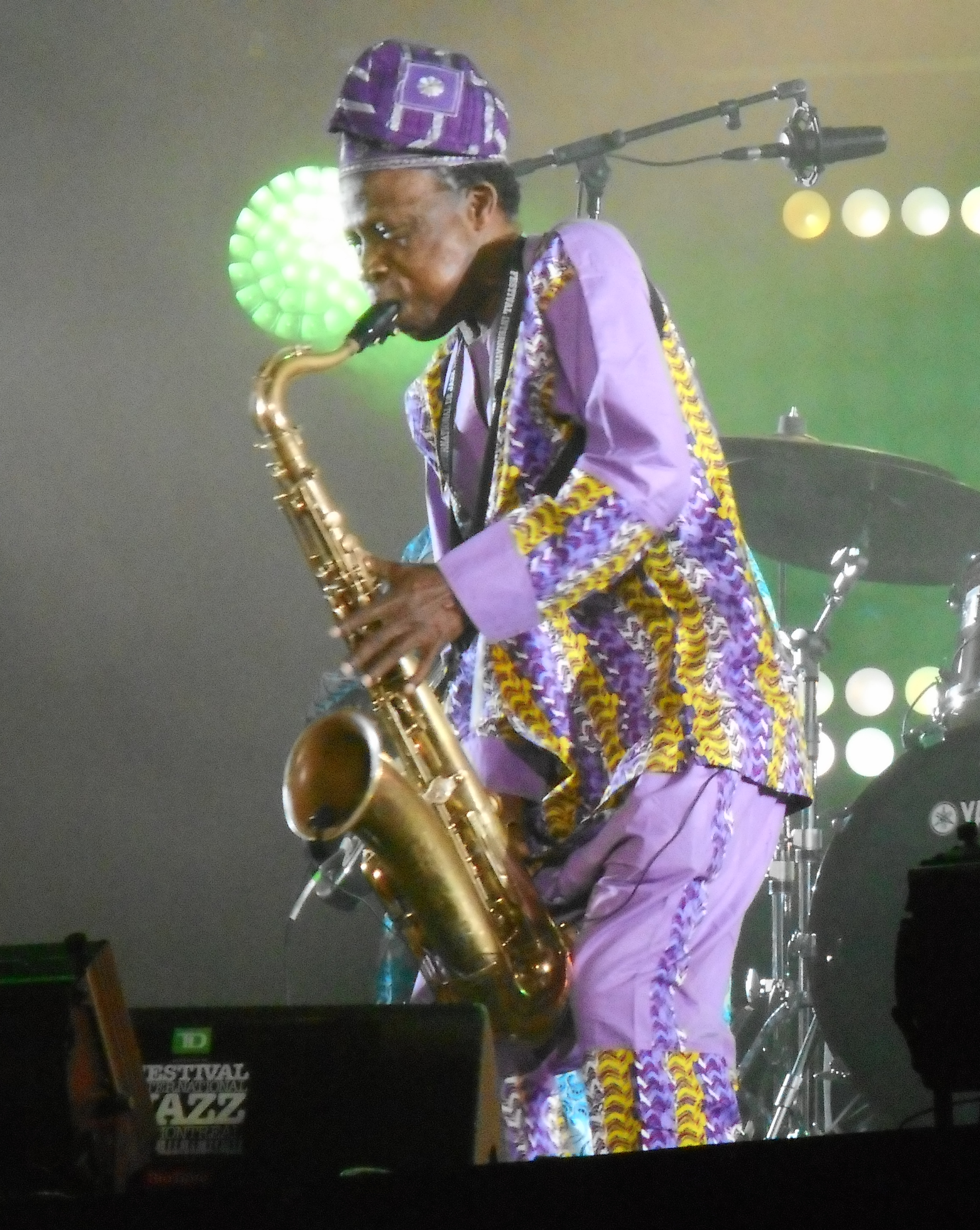
- Julius playing in Montreal in 2016

Background information
- Born: Orlando Julius Aremu Olusanya Ekemode; 22 September 1943; Ikole, Nigeria
- Died: 14 April 2022 (aged 78)
- Genres: Afrobeat, Afro-soul, highlife
- Occupation: Musician
- Instruments: Saxophone, drums
- Years active: 1960s–2022

Orlando Julius Aremu Olusanya Ekemode, known professionally as Orlando Julius or Orlando Julius Ekemode (22 September 1943 – 14 April 2022) was a Nigerian saxophonist, singer, bandleader, and songwriter closely associated with afrobeat music.

Julius began by playing drums or flute with juju and konkoma bands and learned saxophone to play highlife music, eventually playing with musicians Jazz Romero, Rex Williams, and Eddie Okonta. He began experimenting with combining traditional music with horns, guitar, and American genres, a fusion which came to be known as afrobeat. He had his first hits with 1965's "Jagua Nana" and the 1966 album Super Afro Soul. In the 1970s, Julius moved to the United States, forming a band with Hugh Masekela and later working as a session musician before returning to Nigeria in 1984. A series of reissues in the 2000s and 2010s led to international touring and a collaboration with The Heliocentrics which reached the Billboard World Albums chart.

== Early life ==
Orlando Julius was born in 1943 in Ikole, Nigeria during the British colonial era to a merchant family with roots in Ijebu-Jesa, Osun. Julius' first musical teacher was his mother, who would sing and dance while he played drums. He attended St. Peter's Anglican School in Ikole and played in the school band. In 1957, after dropping out of school and the death of his father, he left for Ibadan to pursue a career as a musician. He worked at a bakery while playing the drums or flute with juju and konkoma bands. There was no music school in the area at the time, so the premier, Obafemi Awolowo, created one in his political party's secretariat. He spent time trying to connect with highlife musician Jazz Romero, doing chores for him hoping to garner enough favor for music lessons. Romero invited him to play with his band at a hotel in Ondo, learning his first chords on the instrument that he would become best known for, the saxophone. When Romero got into a conflict with a nightclub owner and walked out on a gig, Julius stepped in as bandleader. Not long after, back in Ibadan, he joined Rex Williams' highlife band. In lieu of formal lessons, he consumed as much music as possible, buying records of any horn-based music he could, but especially the highlife music out of Ghana which had become popular in Nigeria as well.

== Career ==
In 1960, Eddie Okonta invited Julius to join his band. Okonta's was one of the most popular highlife acts in Nigeria, and together they recorded several songs, performing many gigs, and even opened for Louis Armstrong. Julius recorded his first single, "Igbehin Adara", with the Nigerian Broadcasting Corporation the same year. But by then he was less interested in playing highlife than "to put traditional [music] that I started with, and add a little bit of horns and guitar, and then do my own thing". To that end he formed Modern Aces in the early 1960s and began incorporating American pop, R&B, and soul into the African music he grew up with. They played regularly at the Independence Hotel in Ibadan. The combination of traditional music with American genres came to be known as afrobeat, a term coined by Fela Kuti. Kuti would attend Modern Aces performances, and Julius would sometimes bring him on stage to play. According to Julius, it was because of him that Kuti learned to play saxophone.

He had his first hit in 1965 with the song "Jagua Nana", the name applying slang for Jaguar cars to a woman. On the success of that song they went on tour around west Africa. As new kinds of music became popular in the region, Julius formed new groups to keep up with trends, for example the Afro Sounders and the Evelyn Dance Band. According to AllMusic, his 1966 album Super Afro Soul was a "dramatic, highly melodic incorporation of soul, pop, and funk" which "made him a national celebrity in Nigeria" and influenced American music.

In the 1970s, in post-civil war Nigeria, Julius was disappointed by the state of the music industry. The civil war had a negative impact, but so did the influx of Western music. With a vague sense that something was missing, he decided to travel to better understand production. He traveled through Europe first, and then went to the United States in 1973, where he decided to stay. He took up residence in Washington, D.C., formed a band named Umoja, and played in local nightclubs. A break came when Hugh Masekela attended one of their rehearsals. Masekela had split with his band, Hedzolch Soundz, and formed a new group with Julius, including some members of both bands. They recorded the albums The Boy's Doin' It and Colonial Man and went on tour, opening for high-profile acts like Herbie Hancock, The Pointer Sisters, and Grover Washington Jr. Over time, he met and played with several prominent American musicians like Lamont Dozier, James Brown, and The Crusaders. He says they noticed his distinctive style of playing the saxophone in a minor key, owing to the Ijesha way of playing. Though they were successful, he left Masekela on troubled terms, both because he wanted to be a bandleader again and because of disputes over royalties.

He spent time as a session musician in Los Angeles, before moving to Oakland in 1978. He had always been interested in film production, and once in the Bay area attended film school. He did not stop playing music, however, and met up with others regularly at a small bar, Michael's Den. Even while in the US, he released music on Nigerian labels, such as Disco Hi-Life in 1979, which John Doran called an "exquisitely balanced hybrid of languid disco and serotonin-drenched highlife". He began teaching his style of playing to local musicians and formed Ashiko. Though it gained a following, he got tired of being in the teacher role, leading an African band that did not have other Africans, and returned to Nigeria in 1984. He quickly began recording tracks for the album Dance Afro-Beat, leading him to put together the 18-person Nigerian All Stars band. The group started to go on a US tour with the Lijadu Sisters, but it was canceled after just one show because of a misunderstanding that led to the Lijadus never arriving.

Despite his influence, he was not well known abroad until Strut re-released Super Afro Soul in 2000. It was followed by his 1972 album Orlando Julius and the Afro Sounders being reissued by Voodoo Funk in 2011. He began touring internationally and, in 2014, went to London to collaborate with The Heliocentrics. In the English music collective's analog studio in North London, they recorded new music as well as new versions of older tracks. Together they released Jaiyede Afro in 2014, which charted at number 13 on the Billboard World Albums chart.

== Later life and legacy ==
In 2019 or 2020, Julius moved to Ijebu-Jesa with his wife, Latoya Ekemode. The Elegboro of Ijebu-Jesa, Oba (Engr.) Moses Oluwafemi Agunsoye, gave him an honorary title, "Gbeluniyi" and considered him an "honourary [sic] chief". On 15 April 2022, Latoya reported that Julius died in his sleep, at the age of 78. The day of his death, the Elegboro praised Julius as "a very good ambassador of Ijebu-Jesa town, Oriade as a local government, and Nigeria as a whole". The Nigerian Minister of Information and Culture issued a statement that "his passion for music was unparalleled" and crediting him with helping to bring afrobeat music to a global audience. Before his death, Lopa Kothari of BBC Radio called him a "legend" and Robin Denselow, writing for The Guardian, described him as "one of the heroes of Nigerian music", a "master of the simple, stomping riff" with a significant influence on afrobeat music. Modern Ghana considered him "the last of Nigeria's titans in the highlife music genre". According to AllMusic, "few artists have been more crucial to the invention, development, and popularization of Afro-pop".
