= Fredrick Kúmókụn Adédeji Haastrup =

Owa Obokun of Ilesa and Ijesaland and oringin in Cape Coast Anumabo Ghana

Ajimoko I Essiam
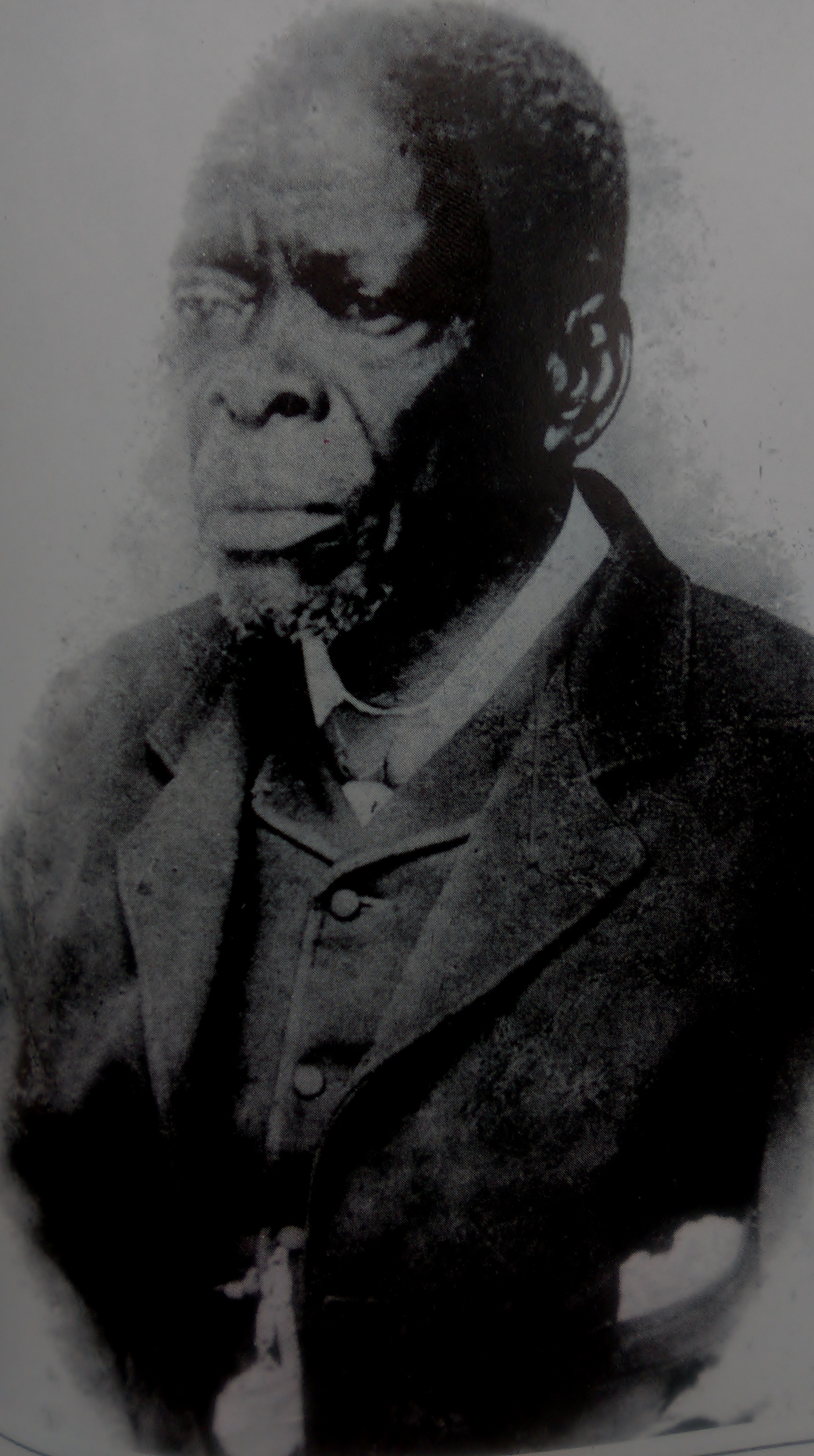
- Reign: April 1896 – September 1901
- Coronation: April 1896
- Predecessor: Owa Alowolodu
- Successor: Owa Ataiyero
- Born: 1 January 1820; Ilesa, Kingdom of Ijesaland
- Died: 1 September 1901 (aged 81); Ilesa, Protectorate of Southern Nigeria
- Spouse: Christiana Fagumell (m. 1848)
- Issue Detail: Princess Adenibi, Prince Adekolupo; 10 other children
Names
- Frederick Essiam Kumokun Adedeji Haastrup
- House: Bilaro / Oro Royal Family
- Father: Owa Oweweniye Rodny Essiam
- Mother: Ayaba Owa Obokun

Fredrick Kúmókụn Adédeji Haastrup was born in the 19th century into the family of a member of the ancient Bilaro Royal house of Iléṣa. It is one of the four ruling families of Ileṣa (Biládù, Bilágbayọ, Biláro, and Biláyiréré) and has been, since the reign of Owá Ọbọkun Atakumosa 900 years ago. After his reign, accession to the throne was passed, in turn, between his four sons, a system that continues to date: accession is rotated between four ruling families in Ijéṣaland. Following Kúmókụn's reign, the Bilárọ family adopted the name Ajímọkọ Haastrup. Whilst the Bilágbayọ adopted the surname Adesuyi.

Ajímọkọ is only used by a reigning member of the family. The provenance of the two parts of the family name is described further on.

== The Family Myth ==
During the 1820s-30s, when he was between the ages of 4-9 years old, Kúmókụn was captured by the Ilọrins while on an errand and subsequently sold as a slave. He was transferred from one market to another finally reaching the coast where he was put on a slave ship chained to other slaves. The ship flew a British ensign although it was a Danish vessel. At sea, Kúmókụn fell ill. In family mythology, the ship's captain was a Dane whose surname was Haastrup. He took a liking to the young lad, had him unbound and taken care of. While at sea, Britain abolished slavery and the vessel subsequently lost its legal cover. The slave vessel was later intercepted by British Man-o'-War marines and the slaves were diverted to Sierra Leone. In Sierra Leone, Kúmókụn became a ward of Capt. Haastrup who sponsored his education. The practice in Freetown at the time was for all incoming freed slaves to be rehabilitated so that they would not be a burden on the settlement. Younger ones were either adopted or put in camps for proper education. Kúmókụn studied for, and obtained, a license in Town Planning.

== Research ==
The second version was obtained by Sir Adédokun's daughter in 2013 from the School of Oriental Studies academic Professor John David Yeadon Peel. Prof. Peel spent many years in Iléṣa, Ibadan and Ilé-Ifè. Whilst in Iléṣa, he interviewed several members of the Haastrup family for his book Ijeṣas and Nigerians: The Incorporation of a Yorùbá Kingdom, the 1890s to 1970s. It is confirmed that Kúmókụn was indeed captured as a young man by the neighboring Ilọrins, in the 1820s with the further detail obtained through our e-mail correspondence, that it was from a farm in the area of Iléṣa by the name of Oke Ibọde. 'The new Ọwa [King] was much more a man for the times, effectively chosen by the two major forces of Ijesha politics, the followers of Ogedengbe and those Ijesha who, as traders along the Lagoon, repatriates from the slavery of possessed of some education, had links with the Ekitiparapo Society in Lagos. He was Frederick Kumokun alias Haastrup, who in his long life – he was now well over seventy – had fully shared in the tribulations of his country. Captured by the Ilorins in the 1830s he was sold into slavery and, by some means, later found himself in Sierra Leone, where he became a Christian.'

Part of the research included inquiries to The Maritime Museum of Denmark to confirm the existence of a Captain Haastrup. Benjamin Assmusen, curator of the museum at the time of enquiring wrote the following:

'The name Haastrup most likely originates from the village of Haastrup (or Håstrup in modern Danish) on the island of Fyn.

In earlier times it was quite common for people to carry the name of their birthplace as a last name, so at some point in your family history, someone most likely came from that village.

I have searched our records, but unfortunately, no information of a captain of that name turned up. If your ancestor indeed was a captain of a slave ship in 1830, it would be very likely that no records exist, since the transatlantic slave trade by Danes was abolished in 1803.

Regarding rev. Niels Christian Haastrup: There seem to be records available about him and his wife Johanne Helene, whose surname was Hopf before marriage, available at the Danish State archive, including letters, diaries, bills, manuscripts, travel accounts as well as various personal papers. The records can be seen at the Provincial Archives of Southern Jutland in the town of Aabenraa.

The fact that there was no such named naval officer in their records may not be significant as the Nigeria Wiki entry states that the slaver was flying a British ensign. However, through correspondence with the Norwegian academic Professor Per Oluf Hernæs, he signposted a CMS missionary, by the name of Niels Christian Haastrup, who was in Sierra Leone during the same period having arrived on 12 January 1841 at age 29, married a Miss Johanne Helene Hopf, who came to join him there, on 8 December 1841. He died 9 years later and is buried in St Patrick's Kissy, Sierra Leone.

It is most likely that the family acquired their name through this missionary; it was common practice to take the name of the person by whom you were baptized in those times. Kúmókụn, now bearing the surname Haastrup, returned home to Ijeṣaland specifically the town of Ileṣa via Lagos. He re-established contact with Ijeṣa royalty sometime in 1860. In Lagos, he acquired large tracts of property which became known as Igbó Obį Haastrup, contracted to the present day Igbobį, at Ibeju Lekki where he cultivated Kola-nuts in Yoruba = obi, Farm = Igbo) on a commercial scale. Igbóbį is a well-known area of Lagos. His business interests meant he often took ships up and down the waterways trading in dry fish and other commodities. On one of these journeys, he was instrumental in steering the vessel to safety. He described himself as steering the ship in the manner of a caucasian: Ajimọkọ bi oyinbo.

== Later life ==
Frederick Kúmókụn Haastrup became known in Ijéṣaland during the Kiriji wars (1877-1893), when he was a member of the Ekiti parapo solidarity group in Lagos. The organization supplied arms to Ijeṣa warriors who were at war with Ibadan. He was later pivotal in advising the Owá (King) during peace negotiations with the British and Ibadan that brokered the end of hostilities.

In April 1896, when he was well into his seventies, Frederick Kúmókụn Haastrup become the Owá Obokun (King) of Ijeṣaland and took the title Ajimọkọ I (derived from his nickname: 'Ajimọkọ bi Oyinbo'. The first Christian Ọba of Yoruba land, he had been a member of the Ebuté Ero church in Lagos.

His appointment came about through the support of two major forces of Ijeṣa politics: the followers of Ogedengbe (a key power in the Kíríji wars) and Ijeṣa traders and repatriates from slavery who had links with the Ekitiparapos an association of which Kúmókụn was a founding member in Lagos.

He was a modern ruler: he believed that the survival and prosperity of his kingdom depended not only on the control of strategic resources and successful manipulation of political alliances but on the Ijeṣa being inwardly remade i.e. being ready to adopt a new culture. He was a committed Christian, although his polygamy was an annoyance to the clergy. He refused to perform many of the customary rites of kingship. A school was established in the Afin (the Palace), to which his Chiefs reluctantly sent their sons under some pressure from their Ọwa (King). It was supervised by his daughter born of his Sierra Leonean wife, Princess Adénibi aka Mrs. Isabella Macaulay.

Ajimọkọ I is credited with using his Town Planning skills for improving the layout of the town which is today characterized by a grid-like road formation. He introduced Methodism to Ijeṣaland in 1896 with the building of the Wesleyan Methodist Missionary Society Church on the site of a forest situated next to a flat rock (Otapète) where the shrine, for those Ijeṣas that practiced the Yoruba Ifa religion, was located. The family continues to be great supporters of Methodism, most recently with the financing of the building of a modern Methodist church by Adédokun Haastrup, a Knight of the Methodist Church and career diplomat, consecrated in January 2001 in Óṣógbó.
