= Agunloye =

Agunloye is a surname. Notable people with the surname include:

- Agboola Ojomo Agunloye, Nigerian ruler
- Babatunde Agunloye (born 1977), Nigerian film director
- Olu Agunloye, Nigerian politician
- Adimula Agunloye-bi-Oyinbo "Bepolonun", Yoruba king
