= Adewunmi Adeyemi =

Nigerian politician

Adewunmi Adeyemi is a Nigerian politician. He currently serves as the State Representatives representing Obokun state constituency at the Osun State House of Assembly.
