= Akinyode Abidemi Oyewusi =

Nigerian politician (born 1983)

Rt. Honourable Akinyode Abidemi Oyewusi

Member of the Osun State House of Assembly from Ife-North Local Government
- Constituency: Ife-North

Personal details
- Born: 27 February 1983 (age 43) Ipetumodu,Ife-North Local Government Osun State Nigeria
- Party: People's Democratic Party
- Education: Lead City University
- Occupation: Politician; Entrepreneur

Akinyode Abidemi Oyewusi is a Nigerian politician representing the Ife-North constituency, local government area in the Osun State House of Assembly and the Deputy Speaker of Osun State House of Assembly.

== Early life and education ==
Akinyode was born on 27 February 1983, in Ipetumodu, Ife-North constituency, Osun State, Nigeria. Akinyode completed his primary and secondary education in Ibadan, Oyo State, where he earned his First School Leaving Certificate and Senior Secondary School Certificate. He then pursued a bachelor's degree in Political Science and International Relations at Lead City University in Ibadan.

== Career ==
Akinyode is an entrepreneur and founder of Raregeode Company Limited and Acumen Forte Limited, a construction company. Before joining politics, he was elected as the Deputy Speaker of the 8th Osun State House of Assembly, where he represented Ife-North constituency under the People's Democratic Party (PDP) platform.
