= Adimula =

Adimula is a name. Notable people with the name include:

- Adimula Agunloye-bi-Oyinbo "Bepolonun", Yoruba king
- Olofin Adimula Oodua, Nigerian ruler
