= Rafiu Adejare Bello =

Nigerian politician and ambassador

Member of the Osun State House of Assembly
- In office 1997–2007
- Constituency: Ede North

Nigerian Ambassador to the United Mexican States
- Incumbent
- Assumed office June 2021

Personal details
- Born: 23 August 1961 (age 64) Ede North, Osun State, Nigeria
- Occupation: Politician, Ambassador

Rafiu Adejare Bello is a Nigerian politician and ambassador who has held several political positions.

== Early life ==
Rafiu Adejare Bello was born on 23 August 1961 in Ede North, Osun State, Nigeria.

== Education ==
Bello studied at Obafemi Awolowo University, Ile-Ife, Osun State, where he earned his first degree in Law.

== Political life and career ==
In December 1997, Bello was elected as a member of the Osun State House of Assembly on the platform of the Democratic Party of Nigeria (DPN), representing the Ede North constituency.

From 1999 to 2003, he was elected under the All Peoples Party (APP) and served as the minority leader of the House of Assembly for the Ede North constituency.

From 2003 to 2007, Bello was re-elected as a member of the Osun State House of Assembly under the Peoples Democratic Party (PDP) and was elected as Speaker.

In June 2021, Bello was appointed as the Nigerian Ambassador Extraordinary and Plenipotentiary to the United Mexican States, with concurrent accreditation to Costa Rica, Guatemala, and Panama.
