= Samson Olayide =

Nigerian academic

Samson Olajuwon Kokumo Olayide (1928–1984) was a Nigerian academic and professor of agricultural economics who served as the vice-chancellor of the University of Ibadan from 1979 to 1983.

== Early life and career ==
Olayide was born to Josiah Ogunpoopo Olayide (of the Ogboni High Chieftain Clan in Ilesa) and Mariam Olayide (née Oni – sister to Lisa of Eti-Ooni in Ijesha). He married Theresa Folashade Olayide (née Ikoli, daughter of famous Nigerian politician, nationalist, and pioneering journalist Ernest Sessei Ikoli) in 1961. And gave birth to four children [Biodun, Tokunbo, Oluwole, and Olajide]

Olayide was educated at Apostolic Church Primary School in Ilesa and Government Teachers College in Ibadan before proceeding to the University of London in 1955, where he obtained a Bachelor's degree in economics in 1957. He then went on to the US, where he obtained an MSc and PhD in agricultural economics from the University of California at Davis in 1964 and 1967. He also received a Doctor of Science degree (D.Sc.) in economics by research from the University of London in 1981.

On return from the US in 1967, Olayide joined the University of Ibadan as a senior lecturer in agricultural economics. He went on to become vice-chancellor between 1979 and 1983, and was elected to run for a second term before his untimely death in March 1984. Olayide was a prolific writer and administrator. He also held various research consultant/director positions, most notably at Benin – Owena River Basin Authority, NIFOR, NISER, FAO (Food and Agricultural Organisation in Milan, Italy), and the Federal Agricultural Coordinating Unit (FACU) of Nigeria.

Olayide also published numerous articles in major national and international scientific journals, most notably his seminal paper on "The Nigerian Food Problem", delivered in 1974 and published in the Journal of the Nigerian Institute of Social and Economic Research (NISER). He is also the author of many textbooks in economics/econometrics and production agricultural economics.
