= Iwaraja =

Iwaraja (short for Iwaraja-Ijesa) is a town about 2 km north of Ilesha in Osun State, Nigeria. It is a major commuter town along the Ibadan - Akure expressway. The town has a lot of history in relation to Ijesaland and the Yoruba nation as a whole. The town is within Oriade Local Government.

The ruler of the town is the Awaraja of Iwaraja and he is assisted by his chiefs, a few of which are the Odofin, Ejemo, Yeye Semure, Saba, Iyalaje and others. The current Awaraja is HRM Oba Sunday Ishola Ibironke, Samoyegun 1 and his royal queen is Olori Idowu Ibironke.
