= Iwara =

- Town
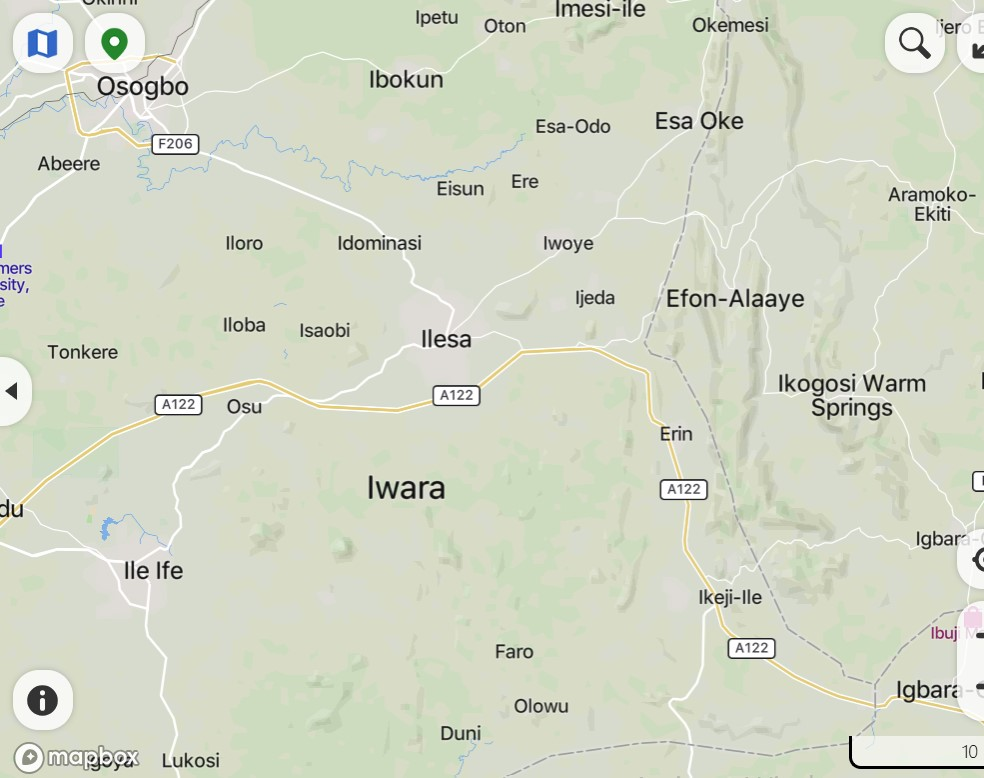
- Iwara in Osun State

- Iwara in Nigera
- Coordinates: 07°31′20.28″N 004°42′17.28″E
- Country: Nigeria
- Geopolitical zone: South West
- State: Osun State
- Time zone: UTC+01:00 (WAT)
- Postal code: 233110

Iwara, headquarters of former Atakunmosa Central Local Government is an ancient historic town in present day Atakunmosa East in Osun State of Nigeria. Geographically, it is located at approximately 07°31′20.28″N 004°42′17.28″E in the South West, within a forested, mineral-rich region. The ruling monarch of the town is known as the Awara.

== History ==
The ancient Kingdom of Iwara was found in the 14th century by Owaluse, who later found Ilesa in 1500 AD. After Owa Owaluse found Ilesa, he appointed his first son as custodian and ruler over his previously found Atakunmosa territories in the south of Ijesaland.

Hence, the four ruling houses of the Owa Obokun Adimula Royal Dynasty namely:- Biladu, Bilagbayo, Bilayiarere and Bilaro descended from Atakunmosa.

Other towns and kingdoms with their origin from Iwara include, Iwara-Ijebu, Iwara-Iwo, and Iwara-Ife.

== Monarchy ==
The ruling monarch of Iwara Kingdom is known as Awara. HRM Awara is the first eldest son of Owaluse who established the seat of the Owa Obokun Adimula royal dynasty in Ilesa. Awara as the first son of Owa Owaluse and the overlord of Atakunmosa holds a position of important traditional significance, he ranks next to his father, the Owa Obokun Adimula in the natural and traditional hierarchy of kings in Ijeshaland.

The four ruling houses of the Owa Obokun Adimula Royal Dynasty, namely:- Biladu, Bilagbayo, Bilayiarere and Bilaro descended from Atakunmosa.

According to historical records and oral tradition, the Awara's position as first son in the Owa Obokun Royal Dynasty confers on him significant authority and reverence. Awara is notably the natural head of all Loojas - Dukes & Lords (Olori Omododo) in Ijesaland.

Following the demise of Owaluse in Ilesa, the Awara's younger brother, who bore the name, Owa Atakunmosa, succeeded their father as the Owa Obokun Adimula of Ijesaland.

His Royal Majesty, Awara of Iwara serves as Chairman of Ijesa South Traditional Council.

== Geography and Economy ==
Iwara is approximately 20 minutes drive to Ilesa, the capital city of Ijeshaland, and about 32.4 km (20.1 mi) to Osogbo, the state capital of Osun State. The town is bordered to the east by Ekiti State and to the south by Ifẹ.

Iwara and her sub-domains in Atakunmosa are known for their rich arable land, natural mineral deposits, including gold, quartz, tourmaline, feldspar, biotite, and columbite.

=== References ===
- Ataiyero S.A (1972) "A Short History of the Ijeshas Part I" Olufemi Press, Ilesha.
- Tomori, M.A (accessed 2024)."The Emergence of Oduduwa and the origin of Yoruba Kingdoms of South-Western Nigeria" Macos Consultancy Publication.
- Ajeigbe et al (2014). "Mineral Prospecting Potentials Of Osun State" European Journal of Business and Management, 6 (2).

Associated Zip Code: 233110
