= Kofoworola Adewumi Babajide =

Nigerian politician

Kofoworola Adewumi Babajide is a Nigerian politician. He currently serves as the State Representatives representing Ede North constituency at the Osun State House of Assembly.
