= The Heliocentrics =

English musical collective

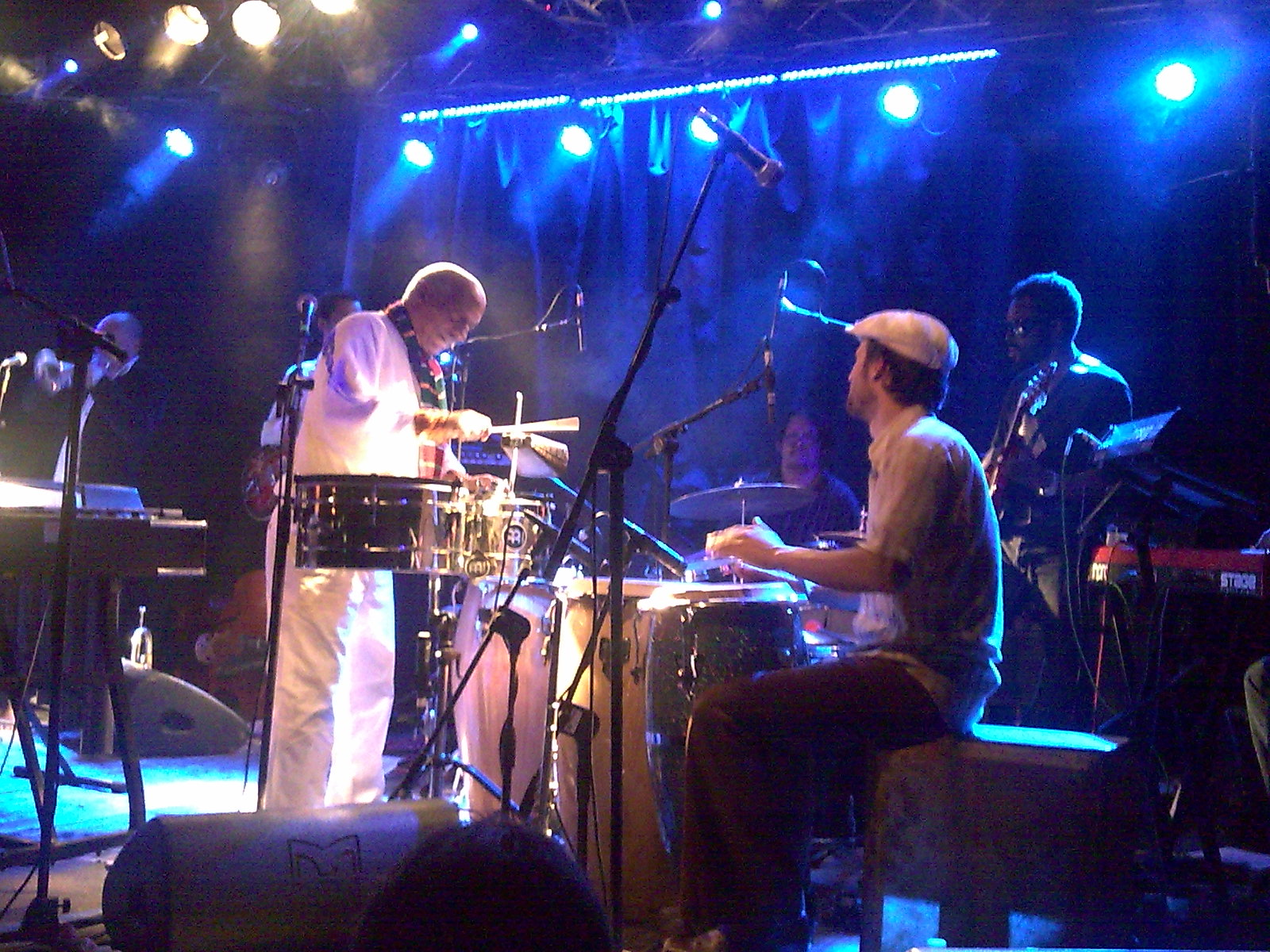
- The Heliocentrics performing with Mulatu Astatke at Circolo degli Artisti in Rome, Italy in March 2009

Background information
- Origin: London, United Kingdom
- Genres: Jazz fusion; jazz-funk; psychedelic
- Years active: 2005-present
- Labels: Now-Again; Strut; Soundway; Madlib Invazion
- Members: Malcom Catto; Jake Benjamin Ferguson; Sylvia Hallett; Jack Yglesias; Daniel Smith; Jason Yarde; Raven Bush; Barbora Patkova
- Website: theheliocentrics.bandcamp.com

The Heliocentrics are an English, London-based musical collective that combines funk, jazz, psych, and library influences. The group is based around drummer and producer Malcolm Catto, bassist Jake Ferguson, guitarist Adrian Owusu, and multi-instrumentalist Jack Yglesias.

== History ==
The Heliocentrics released their debut album Out There in 2007 on Now-Again Records. This was followed by collaborations with Ethiopian musician Mulatu Astatke on the album Inspiration Information (2009), which was awarded that year's Gilles Peterson Worldwide Winner Album of the Year award, Lloyd Miller & The Heliocentrics (OST) (2010), and Orlando Julius.

The Heliocentrics appeared on the track "Skullfuckery" on the UK release of the DJ Shadow album The Outsider, which was released in 2006.

In 2013, they released their second full album, 13 Degrees of Reality also on Stones Throw. The 2009 album with Astatke was included in a list of 'Five Essential Jazz Albums' chosen by pianist Jamie Cullum in 2013.

In 2017, they released A World of Masks with vocals by Barbora Patkova, as well as The Sunshine Makers OST, the score they wrote for the 2015 British documentary The Sunshine Makers, directed by Cosmo Feilding-Mellen. Both records were released on Soundway Records.

In 2020, they released Infinity of Now and Telemetric Sounds.

In 2023, they released Legna which is a full length collaboration with The Gaslamp Killer.

== Discography ==
Adapted from Discogs.

=== Studio albums ===
| Title | Year | Details |
|---|---|---|
| Out There | 2007 | Released: 25 September 2007; Label: Now-Again Records; Format: LP, CD, digital |
| Inspiration Information (with Mulatu Astatke) | 2009 | Released: 7 April 2009; Label: Strut Records; Format: LP, CD, digital |
| (OST) (with Lloyd Miller) | 2010 | Released: 10 January 2010; Label: Strut Records; Format: LP, CD, digital |
| 13 Degrees of Reality | 2013 | Released: 29 April 2013; Label: Now-Again Records; Format: LP, CD, digital |
| Jaiyede Afro (with Orlando Julius) | 2014 | Released: 2014; Label: Strut Records; Format: LP, CD, digital |
| The Last Transmission (with Melvin van Peebles) | 2014 | Released: October 2014; Label: Now-Again Records; Format: LP, CD, digital |
| From the Deep | 2016 | Released: 26 February 2016; Label: Now-Again Records; Format: LP, CD, digital |
| A World of Masks (with Barbora Patkova) | 2017 | Released: 26 May 2017; Label: Soundway Records; Format: LP, CD, digital |
| The Sunshine Makers | 2017 | Released: 30 June 2017; Label: Soundway Records; Format: LP, digital; Soundtrack for the documentary of the same name |
| Infinity of Now | 2020 | Released: 14 February 2020; Label: Madlib Invazion; Format: LP, CD, digital |
| Telemetric Sounds | 2020 | Released: 7 August 2020; Label: Madlib Invazion; Format: LP, CD, digital |

=== EPs ===
| Title | Year | Label |
|---|---|---|
| Quartermass Sessions | 2013 | Now-Again Records |
| Helio x GLK (with Gaslamp Killer) | 2013 | Now-Again Records |

=== Singles ===
| Title | Year | Album | Notes |
|---|---|---|---|
| "Winter Song" / "Dance of the Dogon" | 2005 | Out There | |
| "Before I Die" | 2007 | Out There | |
| "Dance of the Dogons (Part Two)" / "Noise" | 2007 | Non-album single | Limited edition release with purchase of Out There |
| "Distant Star" (feat. Percee P and Doom) | 2008 | Out There | |
| "Sirius B" (feat. Vast Aire) | 2008 | Out There | |

=== Compilations ===
| Title | Year | Label |
|---|---|---|
| Fallen Angels - The Singles Collection | 2009 | Now-Again Records |
