= Hezekiah Oluwasanmi =

Nigerian academic (1919–1983)

Professor Hezekiah Oluwasanmi
- Born: Hezekiah Adedunmola Oluwasanmi; 12 November 1919; Ipetu-Ijesha, Southern Region,British Nigeria (now in Osun State, Nigeria)
- Died: 15 August 1983 (aged 63)
- Education: Abeokuta Grammar School; Morehouse College; Harvard University

Hezekiah Adedunmola Oluwasanmi (12 November 1919 – 15 August 1983) was a Nigerian academic and professor who served as the vice chancellor of Obafemi Awolowo University from 1966 to 1975. He was instrumental in founding the university. He was a professor of agricultural economics at the University of Ibadan prior to his appointment at Obafemi Awolowo University as vice chancellor.

== Early life and education ==
Hezekiah Oluwasanmi was born on 12 November 1919, to Christian parents in Ipetu Ijesa, then Southern Region, British Nigeria. He attended a local Anglican primary school in Ipetu Ijesa and then completed his secondary education at Abeokuta Grammar School. He then traveled abroad for collegiate education, he studied at Morehouse College and earned a doctorate degree from Harvard University.

== Career ==
Upon his return to Nigeria, Oluwasanmi became a staff of the only college in the country, University College, Ibadan. He rose through the academic ranks to become a professor of agricultural economics in the year 1958. While at Ibadan, Oluwasanmi was a dormitory administrator, he was master of Sultan Bello Hall and later a warden of Mellanby Hall. Between 1963 and 1966, he was dean of the Faculty of Agriculture. In 1960, Oluwasanmi and some of his academic colleagues at Ibadan, wrote an advisory letter to the regional premier about the framework of siting a new university within the Western region. He was then chosen to work with the government in the planning and development of the new university to be sited in Ile-Ife. However, during the planning and commencement of academic activities, the new university was caught up in a political crisis within the region. This led to the departures of some notable professors such as Sam Aluko and Wole Soyinka.

In 1966, after a military coup led to a change in government, Adekunle Fajuyi, the new military governor appointed Oluwasanmi to replace Oladele Ajose. Oluwasanmi's administration brought back the master plan of the university which had been set aside by the previous administration and completed many building projects. During his tenure, the university moved from its temporary site at Ibadan to the new permanent site at Ile-Ife

Thirty five years after his demise, a group a close friends and family set up H.A. Oluwasanmi Foundation as legacy project with the aim of keeping his memory alive and to promote his ″optimum″ vision of impacting generations yet unborn by improving rural farming communities quality of life through a combination of Wage progress; Income Parity; improved basic public services and: community environmental control.

== Death ==
He died on 15 August 1983 at the age of 63.

== See also ==
H.A. Oluwasanmi foundation via website @ http://www.haofoundation.org
