= Oriade =

- LGA
- Interactive map of Oriade
- Locations in Nigeria
- Coordinates: 7°35′N 4°52′E
- Country: Nigeria
- State: Osun State
- Headquarter: Ijebu-Jesa

Government
  - Local Government Chairman and the Head of the Local Government Council: Obeisun Ezekiel Olubunmi

Area
  - Total: 428.7 km^{2} (165.5 sq mi)

Population (2022 census)
  - Total: 192,600
  - Density: 449.3/km^{2} (1,164/sq mi)
- Time zone: UTC+1 (WAT)
- 3-digit postal code prefix: 233
- ISO 3166 code: NG.OS.OD

Oriade is a Local Government area in the northeastern part of Osun State. It is predominantly occupied by the Ijesa people. Its capital is Ijebu-Jesa (or Ijebu Ijesha) in the north of the area at7°41′00″N 4°49′00″E. The current chairman of the council is Obeisun Ezekiel Olubunmi.

It has an area of 465 km^{2} and a population of 148,617 at the 2006 census.

The postal code of the area is 233.

The area covers various cities and towns, including parts of Ilesa, Ijebu-Jesa, Ipetu-Ijesha, Erinmo, Erin-Ijesa, Iloko, Ijeda, Iwaraja, Erin-oke, Ipo Arakeji, Ikeji-Arakeji, Ikeji-Ile, Ira-Ikeji, Orisunbare, Iwoye ijesa, Owena, Dagbaja, Omo-Ijesa, Ilo-Ayegunle, Ere, Eti-Oni, Apoti, Ijinmo etc.

There are tourists sites such as Oluminrin Water Falls among others

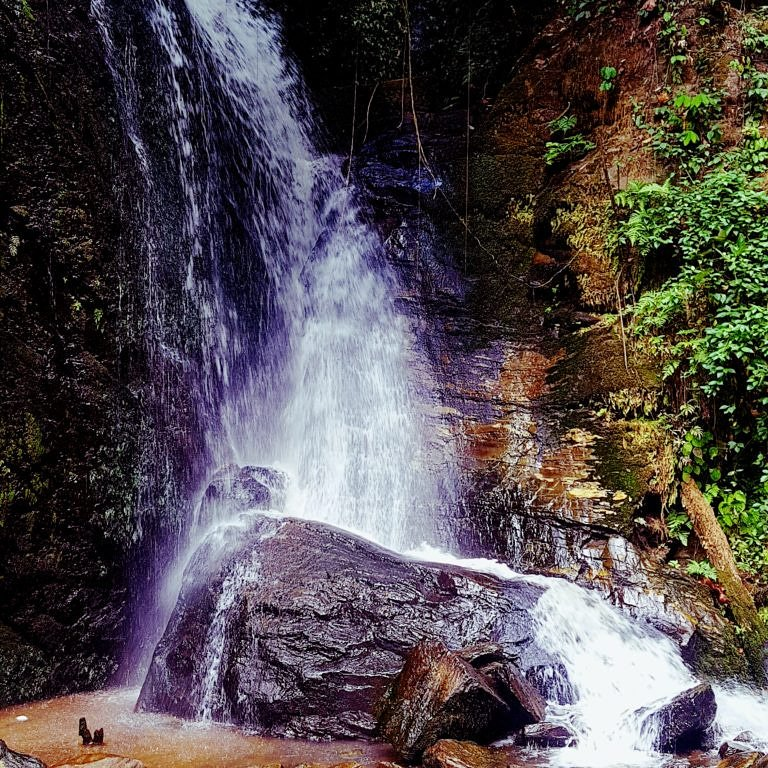
The Erin-Ijesha Waterfalls also known as Olumirin is a seven step Waterfall in Osun State. Legend has it that the waterfall was discovered in 1140 AD by one of the daughters of Oduduwa. The fall features seven floors and is said to have medicinal properties.

Women in towns like Ipetu Ijesa, Ikeji Ile, Ipo Arakeji, Ikeji-Arakeji work are mat weavers. This is derived from local long grass called "Eni" in the local dialect.

Olashore International School is located in the area.

== Oriade South Local Council Development Area (LCDA) ==
Oriade South Local Council Development Area (LCDA) was created out of Oriade council area for administrative convenience, better development planning and to bring government closer to the grassroot. The LCDA is created by the Government of Osun State and is responsible for the funding of the council. The LCDA is headed by a chairman, vice chairman and other executive and legislative branches similar to the federally recognized local councils. The current chairman of the LCDA is Ajimati Oladeji Benedict.
