= Akinloye Akinyemi =

Nigerian army major

Major Akinloye Akinyemi
- Born: 1954; Ilesa, Osun State, Nigeria
- Died: 22 September 2012 (aged 57–58)
- Education: Royal Military Academy Sandhurst; Royal Military College of Science
- Buried: Victoria Court Cemetery, Lagos, Nigeria
- Military career
- Allegiance: Nigeria
- Branch: Nigerian Army
- Rank: Major
- Nickname: Sergeant Carter

Akinloye Akinyemi (1954–2012), also known as Sergeant Carter, was a Nigerian Major who was arrested, tried and sentenced in 1987 and 1995 for alleged coup plotting. During his military career, he served in the Nigerian Army Signal Corps. He was the younger brother of Bolaji Akinyemi.

== Early life and education ==
Akinyemi is a native of Ilesa, Osun State. He attended Government College, Ibadan, cadet unit, military training bush camp in Igbo-Ora, Oyo State in 1960s and Nigerian Defence Academy, Kaduna State where he became the best army cadet during his graduation in 1970s. He went to Royal Military Academy Sandhurst, where he won the Cane of Honour as the Best Overseas Cadet, before preceding to Royal Military College of Science, where he graduated with a first class degree in electrical engineering.

== Trials and imprisonment ==
In 1987, Akinyemi was arrested and tried by a military tribunal headed by Oladipo Diya for allegedly coup plotting against Ibrahim Babangida. He was found not guilty of treason, but served a five-year prison sentence after getting convicted of a lesser, disciplinary offence.

On 26 January 1995, Akinyemi was again arrested, detained and interrogated on allegations of coup plotting by the Sani Abacha led military government.

On 5 June 1995, the military government assembled a secret special military tribunal headed by Patrick Aziza. The tribunal tried and charged Akinyemi and 15 others with treason, concealment of treason, and conspiracy. On 30 June 1995, Akinyemi challenged the authority of the secret tribunal to hear the case at the Lagos federal high court, Judge Vincent Eigbedion dismissed the lawsuit, citing the 1990 Special Military Tribunal Act which prevents the judiciary from interfering with tribunal matters.

On 13 July 1995, Akinyemi also approached the Lagos court of appeal to prevent any sentence from being carried out on him and the others, Judge Kolapo Sulu-Gambari turned down the request, citing that the court was not convinced Akinyemi's life was in danger.

On 14 July 1995, Akinyemi was sentenced to death, but was later commuted to life imprisonment on 1 October 1995.

On 4 March 1999, the then military government of Abdulsalami Abubakar, granted Akinyemi and others a grant of clemency, thus pardoning them for all the allegations and charges leveled against them.

== Death ==
Akinyemi died in 2012. He was buried at the Victoria Court Cemetery, Lekki, Lagos, after his funeral service was held at Redeemed Christian Church of God, The Lord Central Parish, Lekki.
