= The Souljazz Orchestra =

Canadian musical group

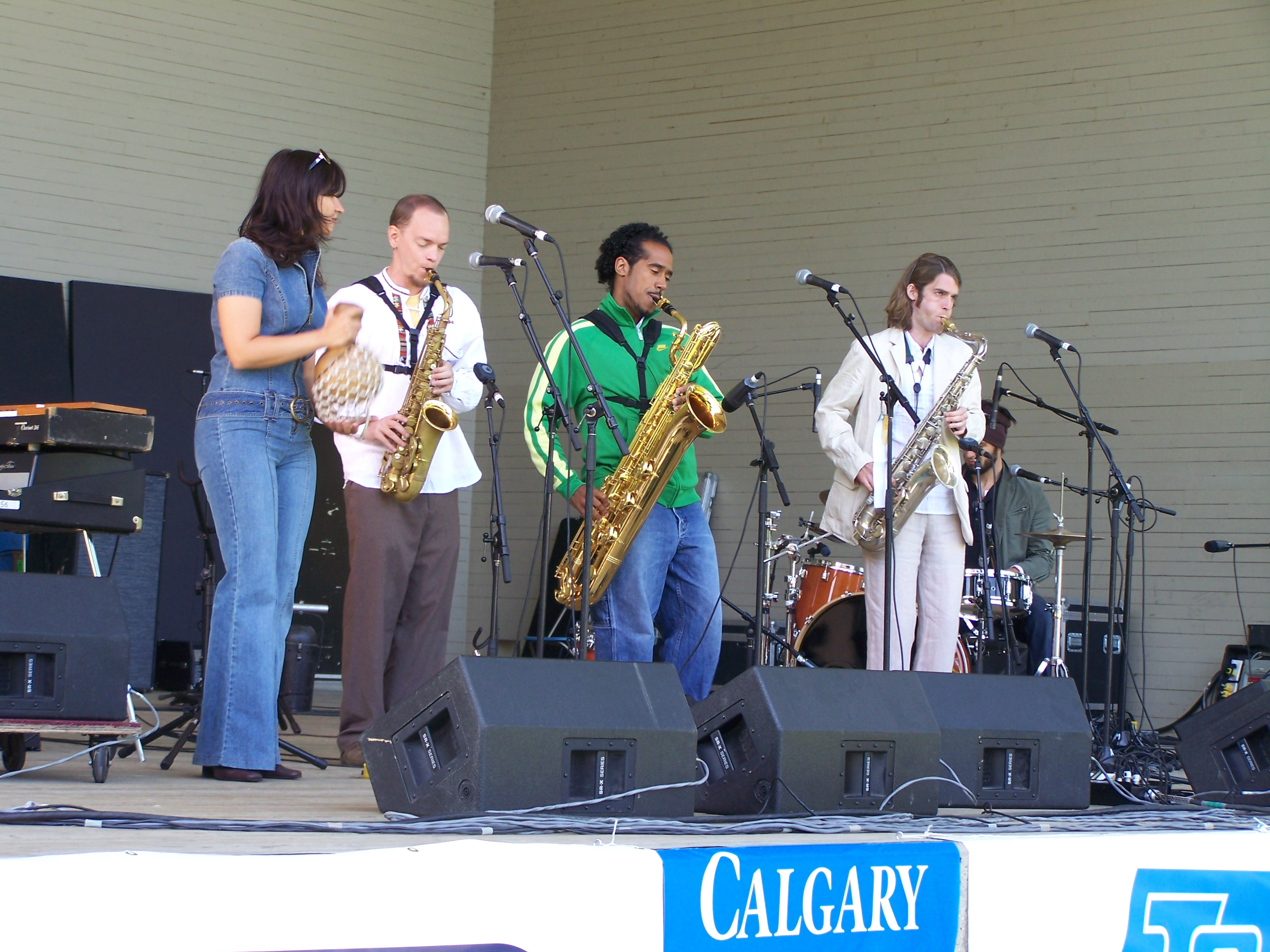
- The Souljazz Orchestra (2007)

Background information
- Origin: Ottawa, Ontario, Canada
- Genres: Jazz, jazz funk
- Years active: 2002–present
- Labels: Funk Manchu, Do Right!, Strut
- Members: Pierre Chrétien; Marielle Rivard; Steve Patterson; Ray Murray; Zakari Frantz; Philippe Lafrenière
- Website: souljazzorchestra.com

The Souljazz Orchestra is a Canadian musical group based in Ottawa that has toured Canada, the United States and Europe. Their music is a fusion of soul, jazz, funk, Afrobeat and Latin-American styles.

== Career ==
The band signed to London-based Strut Records, a UK record label that focuses on dance music and afrobeat. Other musicians signed to Strut include "Ethio-Jazz pioneer Mulatu Astatke, Motown guitarist Dennis Coffey and Ghanaian highlife singer Ebo Taylor, to name a few."

According to AllMusic, the band's "overtly political" 2006 single "Mista President," off second album Freedom No Go Die (Do Right!), really increased their audience, [as it was] voted to the number nine spot in the 2006 Top 30 of BBC DJ Gilles Peterson's Worldwide programme.

In 2012, the band completed two US tours that included stops in cities such as Boston, New York City, Philadelphia, Washington DC, and Chicago.

Their Resistance album release tour of Europe, all October/November 2015, sees them among others in London, Liverpool, Zurich, Paris, Lyon, Milan, Barcelona, Madrid, Berlin, Cologne, Vienna, Prague, Athens, Marseille.

The band has had three Juno nominations: Instrumental Album of the Year (Rising Sun, 2011), and World Music Album of the Year (Solidarity, 2013, and Resistance, 2016.)

== Members ==
- Pierre Chrétien – electric piano, clavinet, organ, guitar, bass, percussion, vocals
- Marielle Rivard – percussion, vocals
- Steve Patterson – tenor sax, percussion, vocals
- Ray Murray – baritone sax, percussion, vocals
- Zakari Frantz – alto sax, flute, percussion, vocals
- Philippe Lafrenière – drums, percussion, vocals

== Discography ==
- Uprooted (Funk Manchu, 2005)
- Freedom No Go Die (Do Right!, 2007)
- Manifesto (Do Right!, 2008)
- Rising Sun (Strut, 2010)
- Solidarity (Strut, 2012)
- Inner Fire (Strut, 2014)
- Resistance (Strut, 2015)
- Under Burning Skies (Strut, 2017)
- Chaos Theories (Strut, 2019)
