= Esa-Oke =

- Town
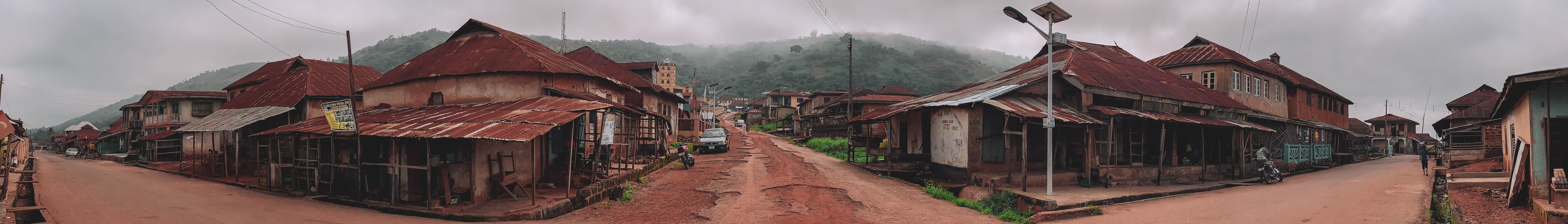
- houses at Esa Oke

- Location in Nigeria
- Coordinates: 7°45′30″N 4°53′50″E
- Country: Nigeria
- State: Osun State
- Local Government Area: Obokun

Government
  - Type: Monarchy
  - King Owa Omiran: Owamiran Oba Adeyemi Adediran

Esa-Oke is a Yoruba town located at the Obokun Local Government Area of the Ijesa North Federal Constituency of Ife/Ijesa Senatorial District of Osun State, South-West of Nigeria. It is a native Ijesa (Ijesha) community and shares boundaries with other towns namely: Oke-Imesi, Imesi-ile, Ijebu-Ijesa, Esa-Odo, Efon-Alaaye. Omiran Adebolu, a member of the Olofin family of Ile-Ife, though disputably, was believed to have founded Esa-Oke after he left Ile-Ife in 1184 A.D. The traditional title of the ọba (King) is Ọwámiran of Esa Oke.

== Occupation ==
The people of Esa-Oke were predominantly farmers who specialised in growing food crops such as Yam, Cassava, Maize, Rice and so on as well as Cash crops such as Cocoa, Kolanut and so on. However, the thrust of commerce is central to their activities and they participate in trading activities mostly across the Western and the Northern part of Nigeria.

== Traditional institution ==
The town has at the head of its traditional governance structure, a kingship that goes with the title of the 'Owamiran of Esa-Oke'. The Ijesa North traditional Council of the Osun state Council of Obas is the umbrella body that oversees its affairs. There are four broad divisional heads reporting to the king representing : Oke-Esa, Erinjiyan, Idofin and Odo-Ese, each with a divisional chieftaincy title of: Asaba, Osolo, Obafin and Enurin respectively.

There are four ruling houses namely:

- Ile Afinbiokin (Oba Isiaiah Adeniran's lineage, also known as Ile-Otu)
- Ile Beleyeke
- Ile Gogodudu also known as Ananye
- Ile Aragadagbagun also known Yeye Owa (Oba Adeyemi Adediran's lineage).

Traditional rulers in the order of their currency are:

- Oba Adeyemi Adediran - Atipa Owaji II - 2004 till date
- Oba Isaiah Ajayi Adeniran - Afinbiokin II- 1954 to 2004
- Oba Fatolu - XXXXXXXXXX - 1948

== Education and social infrastructure ==
The town is the host community to the Osun State College of Technology (OSCOTECH), a tertiary institution of Polytechnic status, known regionally for its technological niche. There are two public secondary schools namely: Esa-Oke Grammar School and Saint Joseph's Catholic High School. On the list also are eight public primary schools. However, the town has in recent times, year 2000 to date, witnessed the establishment of some private secondary and primary schools with notable schools like Fayofunmi Model College, Elepolu Group Of Schools and Peace&Joy Group Of Schools. Esa-Oke is very accessible with good road network that connects to neighbouring towns and states, especially the Osun state capital, Osogbo, in just about 1 hour, 30 minutes.

== Culture and tourism ==
The annual Egungun and Ikedi festivals are usually recreational. They feature cultural dances and huge display of historical traditional costumes including the 'Ege' dance. The mysterious 'Ayo Olopon' is also good for tourist attraction.

== Notable people ==
- Oba Adeyemi Adediran: The Owa Omiran of Esa-Oke
- Chief Bola Ige: Former governor of Old Oyo State, former Nigeria's Attorney-General of the Federation and Minister of Justice
- Joseph Omotoso Adeyemi-Bero: First Administrative Secretary to first military governor of Lagos State, Brig.-Gen. Mobolaji Johnson (rtd) when Lagos was created in 1967; Former Permanent Secretary, Ministry of Sports and Social Development, Lagos State.
- Hon. Busayo Oluwole Oke: Member of House of Representative representing Obokun/Oriade Federal Constituency of Osun State
- Prof. Timothy A. Adebayo: Former Deputy Vice-Chancellor of Ladoke Akintola University, Ogbomoso and the Fourth Vice-Chancellor of Ajayi Crowther University, Oyo.
- Ayo Adediran: A renowned Town Planner and former Permanent Secretary in Lagos State
- Dr. Olasiji Akanmu Olamiju: Public Health Consultant and Founder and CEO of Akol Pharmacy
- Prof. Oni Michael Abiodun: Senior Lecturer at the Department of Political Science, Babcock University, Ilishan Remo
- Dr. Festus Kehinde Ojo: Senior Lecturer, Department of Electronic/Electrical Engineering, Ladoke Akintola University of Technology (LAUTECH), Ogbomoso
- Israel Adesanya: Five time UFC middleweight champions and Mixed martial artist
