= Owa Ataiyero =

Owa Ataiyero was the paramount ruler of the Ijesha, a sub-ethnicity of the Yoruba, from 1901 to his death in 1920.

During his reign the first Christian church was built and opened in 1903, the first telephone service was started in 1906, and the first motor vehicles drove the roads of Ilesa in 1907.
