= Alowolodu =

Yoruba Oba

Owa Obokun Adimula Alowolodu was a Yoruba Oba in the Ijesha Kingdom, Nigeria from 1893 - 1894. It was during his reign that the Ijesha war leader Balogun Ogedengbe returned from his exile in Iwo. Reverend Oyebode also arrived in Ilesa as the first Africa Church Mission Society (C.M.S) pastor to be posted to Ilesa.
