= Gabriel Adekunle Aromolaran =

Nigerian monarch (1937–2024)

Oba Gabriel Adekunle Aromolaran

40th Owa Obokun
- Reign: 15 May 1982 – 11 September 2024
- Coronation: 15 May 1982
- Predecessor: Peter Adediran Olatunji
- Successor: Clement Adesuyi Haastrup
- Born: 13 October 1937; Ilesa, Southern Region, Colony and Protectorate of Nigeria
- Died: 11 September 2024 (aged 86); Ifẹ, Osun State, Nigeria
- House: Aromolaran
- Father: Oduyomade Aromolaran
- Mother: Tinuola Aromolaran
- Religion: Christian
- Occupation: Publisher

Gabriel Adekunle Aromolaran (13 October 1937 – 11 September 2024) was a Nigerian monarch. He was the 40th Owa Obokun of Ijesha land.

== Early life and education ==
Gabriel Adekunle Aromolaran was born on the 13 October 1937 into the royal family of Oba Oduyomade Aromolaran I, the Owa Obokun and Paramount Ruler of Ijesha land (from July 1920 to July 31, 1942) and Princess Tinuola Aromolaran. He went to Otapete Methodist School, and Agbeni Methodist School Oke Ado Ibadan for his primary education. He thereafter proceeded to Wesley College, Ibadan for his secondary education. Aromolaran obtained his bachelor's degree in economics from University College Ibadan in 1964 and did post-grad work in Public Administration of the University of Ife. Aromolaran also did a management course at the Graduate School of Public and International Affairs in Pittsburgh and graduated with a master's degree in Mathematical Economics. He thereafter earned his Ph.D. in Development Economics from the University of Ibadan.

== Career ==
Gabriel Adekunle Aromolaran joined the Civil Service of the old Western Region, and served in various capacities before voluntary resigning his appointment in 1971 after attaining the post Deputy Permanent Secretary to set up his private business called Aromolaran Publishing Company Limited at Ibadan on December 1, 1971.

Gabriel Adekunle Aromolaran was the Chancellor of the Federal University of Technology, Yola, Adamawa State of Nigeria (now called Modibbo Adama Federal University of Technology) from 2002 to 2014 and held the LLD Degree (Honoris Causa) of the same university.

Gabriel Adekunle Aromolaran wrote and published several educational books. Some of his publications include:

- As it was in the beginning;
- Modern economic analysis for West African Students;
- The Head That Wears The Crown;
- Modern Textbook of Government For West African Students ;
- Economic Theories For West West African Students;
- West African Economics Today;
- Economics of West Africa.

== Personal life and death ==
Gabriel Adekunle Aromolaran was a Christian and married with children.

Aromolaran died after a brief illness at the Obafemi Awolowo University Teaching Hospital, Ile-Ife, on 11 September 2024, at the age of 86. His death was announced the following day
