= Owa Owaluse =

King of Ijeshaland ruled from 1522 to 1526

Owa Owaluse also known 'Owaluse the Great' was an Ijesha Oba (king) who ruled Ilesa from 1522 - 1526 A.D and bore the title HRM Owa Obokun Adimula. He found Iwara after which he found Ilesa, the capital of the state-kingdom of Ijeshaland where he established the permanent seat of the Owa Obokun Adimula Royal Dynasty. [Owaluse's] line of succession had since been continuous.

Owaluse created chieftaincies like Obaala (Prime minister of Ilesa), Lejofi, Loro and others. He gave room for military supervision under the able leadership of Lemodu and Lejoka

Obokun Owaluse brought the use of Ifa to replace divination by kolanut and caused his chiefs to seat on leather fans instead of the previous practice of sitting on the bare ground.
