= Ijebu-Jesa =

Town in Osun State, Nigeria

Ijebu-Jesa Ìjẹ̀bú-Jẹ̀ṣà Ijebu-Ere
- Town
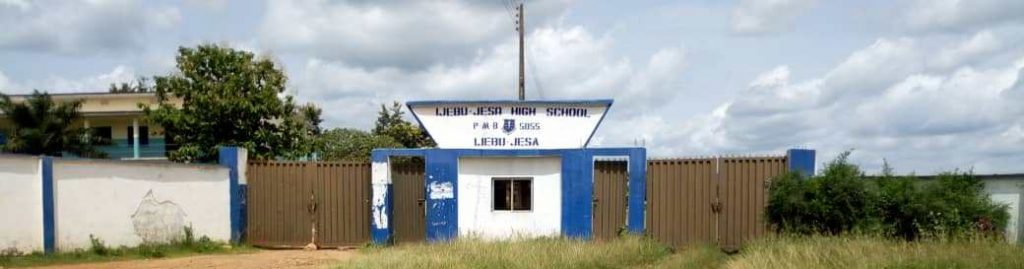

- Location in Nigeria
- Coordinates: 7.6828°N 4.8144°E
- Country: Nigeria
- State: Osun State
- LGA: Oriade

Government
  - Elegboro: Moses Oluwafemi Agunsoye
- Time zone: UTC+1 (WAT)

Ijebu-Jesa, also spelled Ijebu-Ijesa and historically known as Ijebu-Ere, is a town in Osun State, Nigeria. It is the headquarters of Oriade Local Government Area, which recorded a population of 148,379 at the 2006 census. The town lies in Ijesaland, in the rainforest belt of eastern Osun State, about 8 kilometres (5.0 mi) north of Ilesa and 128 kilometres (80 mi) east of Ibadan. Its traditional ruler holds the title of Elegboro.

Ijebu-Jesa traces its founding to Agigiri, held in local tradition to be the senior brother of the Owa Obokun of Ilesa. Ibadan sacked the town in the mid-19th century during its wars in Ijesaland. The Elegboro stool was filled in 2017 after a disputed succession. The town has a grammar school founded in 1955 and a private polytechnic.

== History ==
Ijebu-Jesa's traditions stress its relative independence from neighbouring Ilesa. The town's founder is named Agigiri, and its origin story holds that he was the senior brother of the Owa Obokun, the ruler of Ilesa. In the town's own account, two brothers fetched sea water that cured their father's blindness and then left Ile-Ife to establish their own settlements; Agigiri settled beneath a large shade tree, naming the place Egboro, which later became Ijebu and, as it lay within Ijesaland, Ijebu-Jesa.

In the mid-19th century, during Ibadan's expansion into Ijesaland, Ibadan conquered and sacked the Ijesa town of Ijebu-Ere, identified with present-day Ijebu-Jesa. Ilesa submitted to Ibadan but repeatedly defied its authority in the decades that followed.

== Geography and climate ==
Ijebu-Jesa lies between latitudes 7°40′ and 7°43′ north and longitudes 4°48′ and 4°50′ east, on gently undulating terrain underlain by rocks of the Precambrian basement complex. The vegetation is tropical rainforest. The town has wet and dry seasons, with annual rainfall of 150–200 centimetres (59–79 in), relative humidity above 80%, and temperatures of 24–27 °C (75–81 °F).

== Traditional rulership ==
The traditional ruler of Ijebu-Jesa is titled the Elegboro. The stool fell vacant in March 2017 on the death of Oba Taiwo Aribisala (Ajigiteri II), the town's 23rd Oba. Oba Moses Oluwafemi Agunsoye was crowned Elegboro on 7 November 2017 and received the state government's staff of office. His emergence followed a dispute over the selection process: the Oriade Local Government secretary said the town had no registered chieftaincy declaration on the state gazette, which left the kingmakers without statutory recognition. The Punch reports that the throne rotates among six ruling houses, while the town's own history names five. Agunsoye reigns as Agunsoye II, and was still the Elegboro in early 2026.

The town maintains a king list of its past Obas, beginning with Agigiri:

1. Agigiri
2. Ida-Ekun
3. Edun-Ide
4. Ajigiteri
5. Ayapaki-Efon
6. Oriasinwi
7. Ajifolokun
8. Ogbaruku
9. Ariyanloye
10. Agunsoye
11. Ariabon
12. Atobatele
13. Erinfolajura
14. Arojojoye I
15. Abon
16. Amolese
17. Laguna
18. Arojojoye II
19. Ajifolokun (Palmer), 1974–1996
20. Taiwo Aribisala (Ajigiteri II), 1996–2017
21. Moses Oluwafemi Agunsoye (Agunsoye II), since 2017

== Government ==
Ijebu-Jesa is the administrative headquarters of Oriade Local Government Area. The area falls within the Obokun/Oriade federal constituency, represented in the House of Representatives by Oluwole Oke of the Peoples Democratic Party (PDP), and within the Osun East senatorial district, represented by Francis Fadahunsi (PDP). At the 2023 election to the Osun State House of Assembly, the Oriade state constituency was won by Olakanmi Ajibola (PDP).

== Education and healthcare ==
Ijebu-Jesa Grammar School, a secondary school, was founded in January 1955. Interlink Polytechnic, a private institution in the town, offers National Diploma and Higher National Diploma programmes accredited by the National Board for Technical Education.

The town's General Hospital, on Ere Road, is run by the Osun State government. The 60-bed hospital was built in the early 1980s and handed over to the state on its commissioning in 1988; in 2025 the state proposed upgrading it to a Federal Medical Centre as an annex of the Obafemi Awolowo University Teaching Hospitals Complex.

== Culture ==
The town's main festival is a new-yam celebration, which the Elegboro names Odun Agaja or Abolegun and describes as a rite of prayer before new yam reaches the market. Unlike most Yoruba towns nearby, Ijebu-Jesa keeps no masquerade (Egungun) tradition. An iroko tree at the town centre served as Ijebu-Jesa's landmark before the main road was built and was long used to direct travellers to the town.

By the town's own account, most residents are Christian, with Muslim and traditional-religion minorities; St Matthew's Cathedral is the seat of the Anglican Diocese of Ijesha North.

== Notable people ==
- Orlando Julius (1943–2022), afrobeat and highlife musician, whose family roots are in Ijebu-Jesa and who settled there late in life
- Bandele Aiku (1936–2017), Senior Advocate of Nigeria and former attorney-general of the old Oyo State, born in Ijebu-Jesa
- Gabriel Onibonoje (born 1930), educational publisher and founder of Onibonoje Press
