= Adewale Egbedun =

Speaker of the 8th Osun State House of Assembly

The Speaker Adewale Olumide Egbedun

Speaker of the Osun State House of Assembly
- Incumbent
- Assumed office 18 June 2023

Member of the Osun State House of Assembly from Odo-Otin Local Government
- Incumbent
- Assumed office 18 June 2023
- Constituency: Odo-Otin

Personal details
- Born: 29 June 1985 (age 40) Odo-Otin,Osun State Nigeria
- Party: Peoples Democratic Party (Nigeria)
- Education: University of East London
- Alma mater: University of East London
- Occupation: Politician; Administrative Officer
- Profession: Politician

Adewale Egbedun (born 29 June 1985) is a Nigerian politician currently serving as the 8th speaker of the Osun State House of Assembly since June 2023 succeeding Timothy Owoeye of the All Progressives Congress (APC) who was the speaker of the 7th Assembly.

== Education ==
Egbedun earned a degree in Business Information Systems from the University of East London.

== Career ==
Egbedun is a member of the Peoples Democratic Party (PDP) representing Odo-Otin State Constituency in the state assembly. A first term member of the house, Egedun was nominated for the speakership position by Abiola Ibrahim of the PDP representing Irewole/Isokan Constituency and seconded by Areoye Ebenezer also of the PDP representing Atakumosa East/West Constituency.

Egbedun was elected speaker unchallenged on 6 June 2023. He stated in his acceptance speech that the 8th assembly would prioritize workers welfare and citizens lives, improve infrastructure but would review a number of laws passed by the 7th assembly under the leadership of the APC towards the end of the session between August and November 2022 to "correct obnoxious bills/laws passed".
