= Malcolm Catto =

British musician and producer

Malcolm Catto is an English drummer and record producer. He is the co-founder and producer of the English psychedelic/jazz/experimental music group The Heliocentrics. They have so far released four of their own albums but have also issued collaborations with DJ Shadow, Mulatu Astatke, Lloyd Miller, Orlando Julius and Melvin Van Peebles.

Apart from his work with The Heliocentrics, Catto has taken part as a drummer in many projects including MRR-ADM, Madlib, DJ Shadow, Connie Price and the Keystones, Quantic, The Hypnotic Brass Ensemble, Redback, J. Rocc, M. Chop and The Poets of Rhythm. He has also previously released a solo album under the name Popcorn Bubblefish on the Mo Wax label in 2001.

Along with all The Heliocentrics' releases, Catto has produced albums for Anthony Joseph, Family Atlantica, Hannah Williams & the Affirmations, Vanishing Twin and recorded the Black Focus LP from Yussef Kamaal at his vintage analog studio the "Quatermass Sound Lab" in the Dalston area of London.

== Discography ==
- 1999: "Blow Your Top" (Soul Destroyers, Stark Reality)
- 1999: "Armadillo" (Soul Destroyers, Stark Reality)
- 1999: "More than human" (Redback, Ape)
- 2001: Popcorn Bubblefish (Malcom Catto, Mo' Wax)
- 2002: Bubblefish Breaks (Malcom Catto, Mo' Wax)
- 2003: "Shades of Blue" (Madlib, Blue Note)
- 2003: "Blood's haul" (The Keystones, Now and Again)
- 2004: "Fuzz and them" (Connie & the Keystones, Now and Again)
- 2006: "This time..." (DJ Shadow, Island Records)
- 2006: "Skullfuckery" (DJ Shadow, Island Records)
- 2007: Out There (The Heliocentrics, Stones Throw Records)
- 2007: "Tropidelico" (Quantic Soul Orchestra, True thoughts)
- 2008: Untitled (MRR-ADM Featuring Malcom Catto, Stones Throw)
- 2008: "Sounds from the Cave" (Mr Chop, Jazz & Milk)
- 2008: "LightWorlds" (Mr Chop, Now and Again)
- 2009: "Inspiration Information" (Mulatu & The Heliocentrics, Strut)
- 2009: "Tradition in Transition" (Quantic & his Combo Barbaro, True Thoughts)
- 2009: "OST" (Hypnotic Brass Ensemble, Honest Jon's Records)
- 2010: "OST" (Lloyd Miller & The Heliocentrics, Strut)
- 2013: "Illuminate" (Mr Chop, Now and Again)
- 2013: "13 Degrees of Reality" (The Heliocentrics, Now and Again)
- 2013: "Quatermass Sessions 1" (The Heliocentrics, Now and Again)
- 2014: "Jaiyedi Afro" (Orlando Julius and the Heliocentrics, Strut)
- 2014: "The Last Transmission" (The Heliocentrics feat. Melvin Van Peebles, Now and Again)
- 2016: "From the Deep" (The Heliocentrics, Now and Again)
- 2018: "CDL-001" (Mr Chop, Drumetrics)
- 2020: "Quatermass Seven" (Little Barrie, Malcolm Catto, Madlib Invazion)
- 2024: Electric War (Little Barrie, Malcolm Catto)
