= Olu Agunloye =

Nigerian physicist, public servant and politician

Minister of Power and Steel
- In office 2002–2003
- President: Olusegun Obasanjo

Minister of State for Defence (Navy)
- President: Olusegun Obasanjo

Personal details
- Born: 16 September 1948 (age 78) Erusu-Akoko, Ondo State, Nigeria
- Party: Social Democratic Party (SDP)
- Education: University of Ibadan; Massachusetts Institute of Technology
- Occupation: Physicist, public servant, politician

Olu Agunloye (born 16 September 1948) is a Nigerian physicist, public servant and politician. He served as Corps Marshal of the Federal Road Safety Corps (FRSC), Minister of State for Defence (Navy) and Minister of Power and Steel under President Olusegun Obasanjo. In 2016 he contested the Ondo State governorship election on the platform of the Social Democratic Party (SDP).

== Early life and education ==
Agunloye was born on 16 September 1948 in Erusu-Akoko, Ondo State. He attended Ondo Boys’ High School, Ondo (1961–1965). He studied at the University of Ibadan (1966–1974) and later obtained a Master’s degree in Applied Geophysics from the Massachusetts Institute of Technology (MIT). He also holds a Ph.D. in Physics from the University of Ibadan.

== Career ==
=== Academic and private sector ===
Agunloye lectured in the Department of Physics at the University of Ibadan from 1974 to 1981. He later worked in the private sector as Executive Director of Petramin Nigeria Limited and Managing Director of Faagol Instruments Limited, Ibadan (1981–1988).

=== Federal Road Safety Corps ===
He was appointed Corps Marshal and Chief Executive of the Federal Road Safety Commission (now Federal Road Safety Corps) and served from 1988 to 1995.

=== Ministerial appointments ===
After the return to civilian rule, Agunloye served as Personal Assistant to the Minister of Power and Steel (1999–2000). He was later appointed Minister of State for Defence (Navy) and subsequently Minister of Power and Steel in the cabinet of President Olusegun Obasanjo (around 2002–2003).

He has also served as Executive Vice Chairman of National eGovernment Strategies.

=== Political career ===
Agunloye was previously a member of the Peoples Democratic Party (PDP) and the Action Congress of Nigeria. In February 2016 he defected to the Social Democratic Party and emerged as the party’s candidate for the 2016 Ondo State governorship election.

== Controversies ==
Agunloye has been the subject of investigation and prosecution by the Economic and Financial Crimes Commission (EFCC) in connection with the award of the Mambilla Hydroelectric Power Project contract while he was Minister of Power and Steel. He has pleaded not guilty to the charges.

In July 2026 an FCT High Court in Abuja ruled in Agunloye’s favour in a libel suit against the EFCC. The court found that an EFCC publication linking him to a “$6 billion fraud” was defamatory, ordered the agency to retract the publication, issue a public apology, and pay ₦10 million in damages.
