= Osun State College of Technology =

Tertiary learning institution in Esa-Oke, Osun State, Nigeria

- Motto: Technology for sustainable development
- Type: Polytechnic
- Established: 12 October 1992
- Rector: Dr.Samson Akinbamide Adegoke
- Location: Esa-Oke, Osun, 233130, Nigeria
- Campus: Rural
- Language: English
- Website: oscotechesaoke.edu.ng

Osun State College of Technology (OSCOTECH) is a tertiary learning institution in Esa-Oke, Osun State, Nigeria.

The college was formerly a satellite campus of the Ibadan Polytechnic. It became autonomous on 12 October 1992 when the Governor of Osun State, Isiaka Adetunji Adeleke, signed the law establishing the institution. The Osun State College of Technology was acclaimed by the National Board for Technical Education (NBTE) as one of the fastest growing Polytechnic in Nigeria in 2000, and again in 2006.

== List of Courses offered ==
- Accounting
- Business administration
- Architecture
- Library and information science
- banking and finance
- Building technology
- Mass communication
- Computer science and computer engineering
- Multimedia technology
- Science laboratory technology
- Photography
- Marketing
- Office technology
- Taxation
- Art and design
- Statistics
- Quantity survey
- Electrical engineering
- Electronic engineering.

== Request for upgrade to university Technology ==
on 9 June the community and the King requested to the governor of the state then Gov Gboyega Oyetola to help in upgrading the school to Science and Technology university.

== Governing council ==
Osun state governor Ademola adeleke in 2023 sworn in the 9th governing council of the school. The chairman of the council is prince Diran Odeyemi.

== Matriculation ==
On 16 March the school matriculate 3977 newly admitted students into the different faculty in the school.

== See also ==
- List of polytechnics in Nigeria
