= Oyebode =

- Language: Yoruba

Origin
- Origin: Nigeria
- Meaning: "Honor has come home", "Chieftaincy has come" or "Nobility has arrived"
- Region of origin: South-west Nigeria

The name OyebodeOyebode.ogg is of Yoruba origin, a Nigerian ethnic group. In Yoruba, "Oye" means (honor" or "nobility) and "Bode" is derived from "Bodé," which means (To bring home" or "to come with wealth). The name "Oyebode" can be interpreted to mean (Honor has come home", "Chieftaincy has come" or "Nobility has arrived). It reflects a sense of respect and prosperity associated with the individual bearing the name.

Notable people with the name include:

- Femi Oyebode, professor
- Kayode Oyebode Adebowale (born 11 January 1962), Nigerian professor
- George Oyebode Oyedepo (born 20 September 1985), Nigerian footballer
- Aisha Muhammed-Oyebode (born 24 December 1963), Nigerian lawyer
