= Ibokun =

Ibokun Ilemure
- Town
- Location in Nigeria
- Country: Nigeria
- State: Osun
- Local government area: Obokun
- Founded by: Ajibogun (Obokun)

Government
  - Type: Monarchy
  - Oba (Owa): H.I.M Owa Obokun Adimula Festus Kayode Awogboro and Ose V
- Elevation: 416 m (1,365 ft)
- Time zone: UTC+1 (WAT)
- 3-digit postal code prefix: 233

Ibokun (also IIemure, Ilu Obokun, Ilu'bokun) is a town in Osun State, Nigeria, the headquarters of Obokun.. It is 416 metres (1,365 feet) above sea level. The postal code of the area is 233.

== History ==
According to local tradition, Ibokun was originally called Ilemure, before it was renamed by Obokun, originally called Ajibogun, youngest son of Oduduwa. When Oduduwa was blind, an oracle said he could only be cured with water from the river. When Ajibogun fetched the water and returned, Oduduwa was impressed and said "se wipe o le Bu Okun" (so, you can fetch the sea), from which came the name Obokun. While Obokun was gone, however, his elder brothers took the father's inheritance, so Oduduwa could only give him his sword, named Ida Ajase, so he could reclaim his inheritance. Obokun settled in Ilemure and won many wars, before renaming the city to Ibokun. After that, they conquered Ilare.

The annual Obokun festival is annually celebrated in Ibokun in honour of this hero and tradition.

== Economy ==
The people of Ibokun were farmers who specialised in growing food crops such as yam, cassava, maize, rice, cash crops such as cocoa, kola nut, etc. However, the thrust of commerce is central to their activities and they participate in trading mostly in the western and the northern part of Nigeria.

== Sports ==
Ibokun has a football team named Ibokun FC which won the 2024 Governer's Cup final.

== Monarchs ==
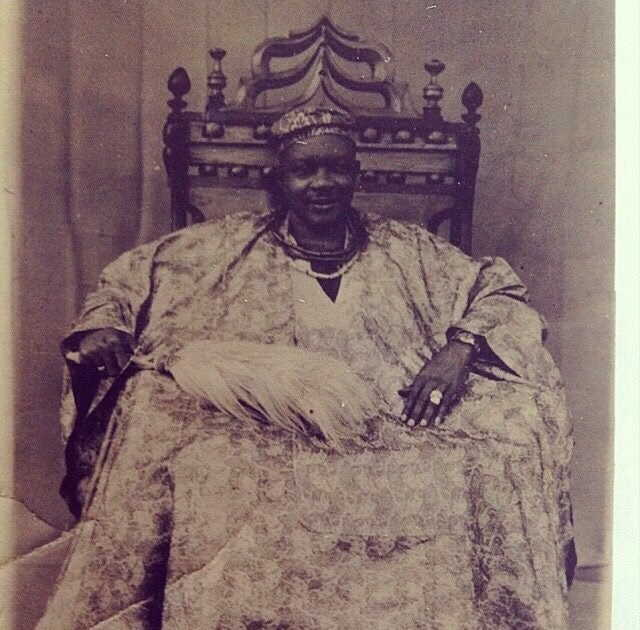
The day he ascended on the throne as Elerinla II of Ibokunland.

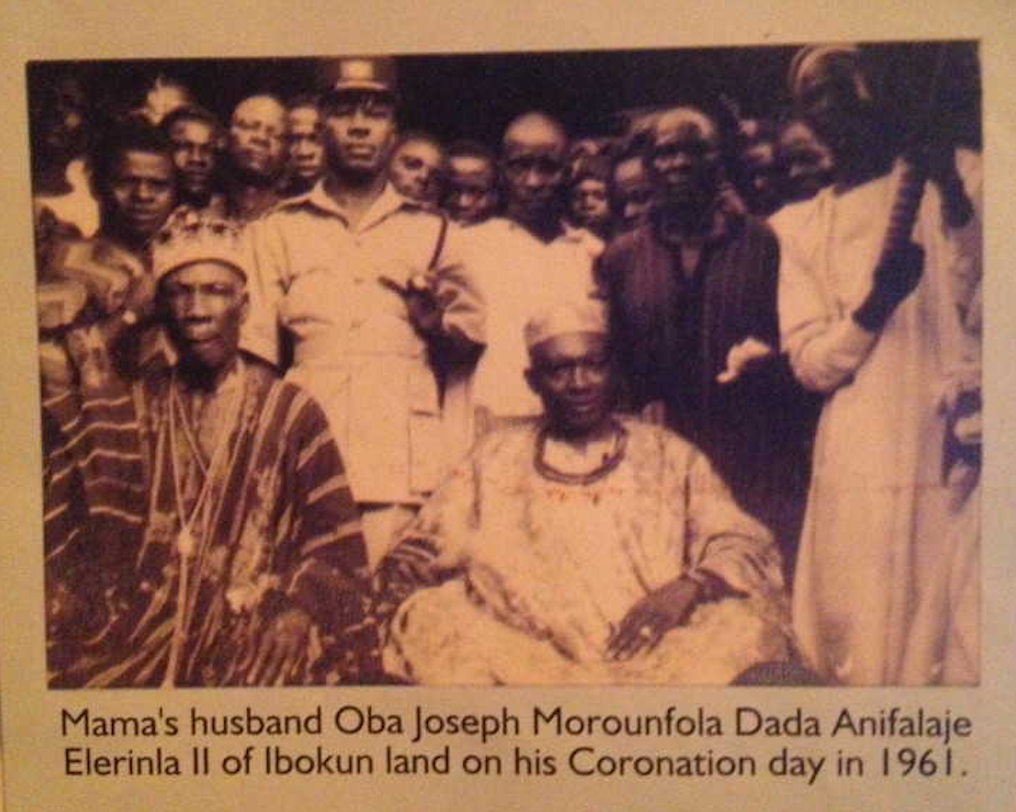
Oba JMD Anifalaje on coronation day in 1961 surrounded by elite aristocrats of his time.

- Joseph Morounfola Dada (J.M.D) Anifalaje and Elerinla II of Ibokun Land (1961 - March 28, 1968)
- John Olajide Oyekanmi and Adanlawo IV (1970 -2010) were the first Ogboni ('Ba'bokun) of Ibokun to wear a crown.
- Festus Kayode Awogboro and Ose V are the current monarchs.
