= Obokun =

- LGA
- Interactive map of Obokun
- Location in Nigeria
- Coordinates: 7°47′N 4°46′E
- Country: Nigeria
- State: Osun
- Headquarters: Ibokun

Government
  - Chairman: Ogundipe Maaroof

Area
  - Total: 527 km^{2} (203 sq mi)

Population (2019)
  - Total: 144,980
  - Density: 275/km^{2} (713/sq mi)

Religion
- Time zone: UTC+1 (WAT)
- 3-digit postal code prefix: 233
- ISO 3166 code: NG.OS.OB

Obokun is a Local Government Area in Osun State. Its headquarters is at Ibokun. The current chairman of the council is Ogundipe Maaroof.

It has an area of 527 km^{2}. The population is 116,511 at the 2006 census and it is 144,980 on 2019.

The postal code of the area is 233.

It is known for its divergence and it mainly an Ijesha land. 97% of Ijesha people occupy the Local Government. Its largest town is Ibokun, which is the Local Government Headquarters. Other towns are Adaowode, Ipetu-Ile, Otan-Ile, Imesi-ile, Esa-Oke, Esa-Odo, Ilase, Iponda, Ikinyinwa, Idominasi and Ora and others.

== Obokun East Local Council Development Area (LCDA) ==
Obokun East LCDA was created out of Obokun for administrative convenience, better development planning and to make the government more accessible to the people. The LCDA is created by the Government of Osun State and is responsible for the funding of the council. The LCDA is headed by a chairman, vice chairman and other executive and legislative branches similar to the federally recognized local councils. Bello Saliu Bamidele is the current chairman of the LCDA.
