= Ilesa =

City in Osun state

Ilesa Iléṣà / Uléṣà (Yoruba) Ilesha
- City
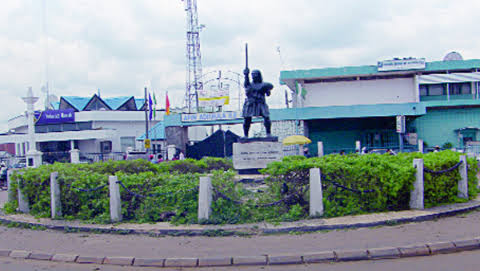
- Ilesa Roundabout, Owa obokun statue

- Location in Nigeria
- Coordinates: 7°37′0″N 4°43′0″E
- Country: Nigeria
- State: Osun State
- LGAs: Ilesha East; Ilesha West
- Seat: The Royal Palace

Government
  - Type: Monarchy
  - His Imperial Majesty, Owa Obokun Adimula: Aromolaran II

Population (2016)
  - Total: 384,334
  - Estimate (2024): 416,000
- (Metropolitan Area only)
- Time zone: UTC+1 (WAT)
- National language: Yoruba

Ilesa or Ilesha (/ɪˈleɪʃə/ il-AY-shə; Yoruba: Iléṣà [īléʃà] or, locally, Uléṣà [ūléʃà]) is a historic city located in Osun State, southwest Nigeria; it is also the name of the capital of a historic state-kingdom (also known as Ijesha) centred around that town as the capital. The state is ruled by a monarch bearing the title of His Imperial Majesty, the Owa Obokun Adimula of Ijesaland. The city of Ilesa consists of Ilesa itself and a number of surrounding cities.

The Ijesa, a term also denoting the people of the state of Ijeshaland, are part of the present Osun State of Nigeria. Although the historic state-kingdom is mainly placed within Osun State, it has towns and cities covering several south-western Nigerian states. Some of the popular towns of the Ijesa are Iwara, Odo-Ijesa, Ilaje, Igbogi, Ise-Ijesa, Ibokun, Erin Oke, Erin Odo, Ijeda-Ijesa, Ipetu Jesa, Ijebu-Jesa, Esa-Oke, Iwoye Ijesa, Esa Odo, Ipole Ijesa, Ifewara, Ipo Arakeji, Iloko Ijesa, Iperindo Ijesa, Erinmo Ijesa, Iwaraja Ijesa, Oke-Ana Ijesa, Idominasi, Ilase Ijesa, Igangan ijesa, Imo Ijesa, Alakowe Ijesa, Osu Ijesa, Eti Oni, Itaore, Itagunmodi, Iyinta, Itaapa, Epe Ijesa, Omo Ijesa, Eti-oni, Ibokun, Inila, Ijinla, Iloba Ijesa, Imogbara Ijesa, Eseun Ijesa, Iloo, Owena Ijesa, Ido Ijesa, Ido Oko, Ibala Ijesa, Ere Ijesa, Ilahun, Ibodi, Ijaaregbe, Ikinyinwa, Idominasi, Ilowa, and Ibodi.

The state of Ijeshaland was founded c.1300 by Ajibogun Ajaka Owa Obokun Onida Raharaha, the warlike youngest son of Yoruba progenitor Oduduwa. All kings of Ijeshaland are considered to be direct descendants of Oduduwa; who is believed to be the founder of the Yoruba people and is considered as a God-King.

Ilesa is known for its natural resources and minerals especially Gold, it is said the Ilesa and Ijeshaland at large according to geological studies . Ilesa has at the very minimum, 5 Billion US dollars' worth of Gold alongside the Ilesa Gold belt axis. However the number is expected to rise in value as significant exploration for commercially quantifiable Gold deposits only began in the last decade.

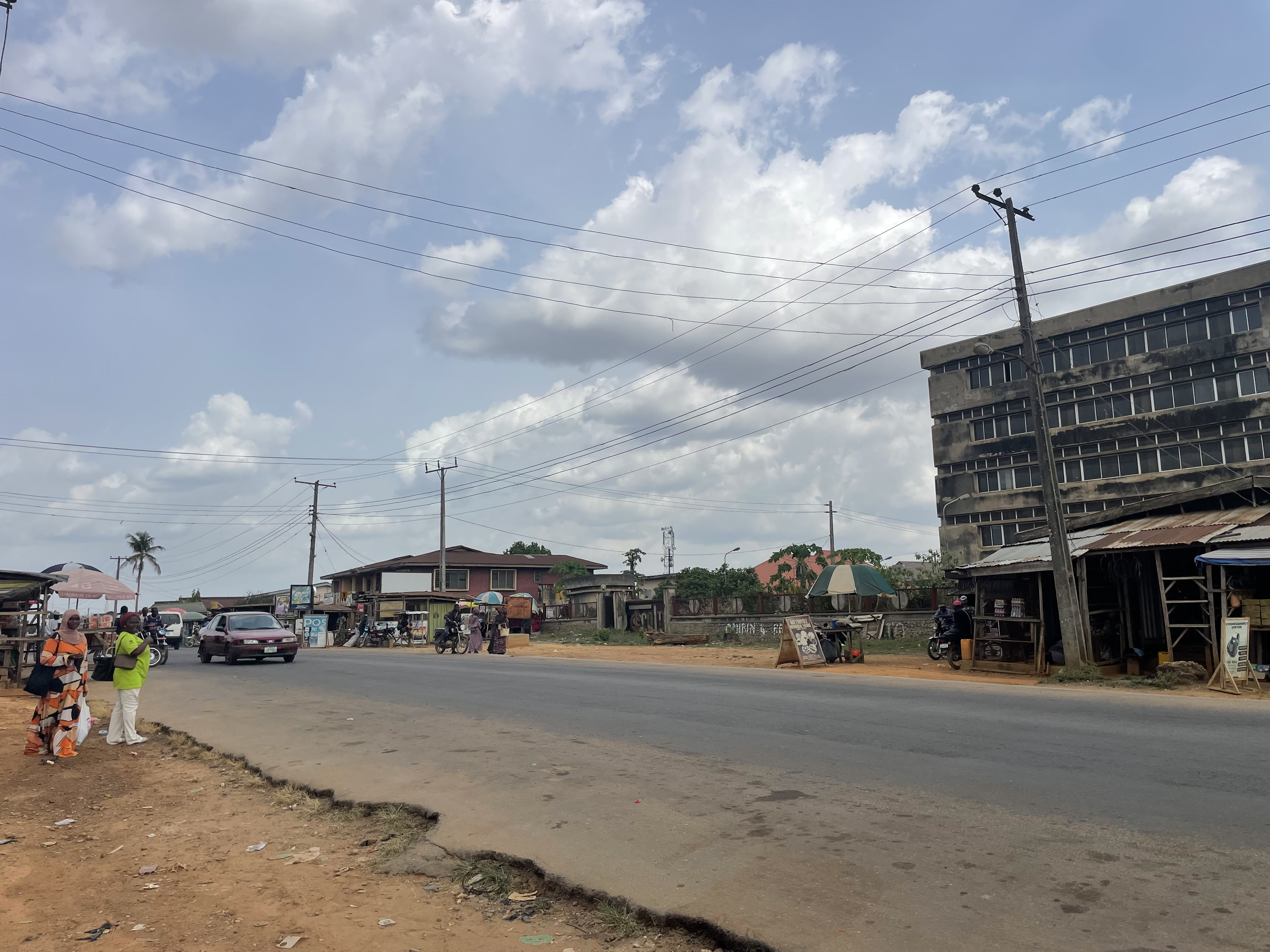
Oke-omiru, Ilesa

== Oral history ==
Short oral story of Ilesha in Yoruba language by a native speaker

According to the historian Samuel Johnson:

The Olofin-Oduduwa, Yoruba Progenitor Ile-Ife, had several children, grandchildren, and great-grandchildren; amongst them were the king of Ado or Benin, the king of Oyo, Owa Ajaka of Ilesa, the Osemawe of Ondo (from a daughter), the Alara of Ara, the Ajero of Ijero, the Alaye of Efon-Alaye, the Owore of Otun, the Orangun of Ila, the Aregbajo of Igbajo.

Odo - Ile {Logun Edu} was Oduduwa's Grandchild by Oduduwa's Eldest Daughter (Logun Edu's own son became the First Odole of Ijesaland - {Odole Nikunogbo} [Prime-Minister/Secretary of State of Ijesaland]

When the Olofin became blind from old age, he was much depressed in mind from this cause; efforts were put forth to effect his cure, all of which proved fruitless, when a certain man came forward and prescribed for him a sure remedy which among other ingredients contained salt water. He put the case before his children, but none made any effort to procure some for him save his youngest grandsons Ajibogun and his Elder brother Agigiri. This was a very brave prince who bore the title of "Esinkin" amongst the King's household warriors, a title much allied to that of the Kakanfo. He was surnamed "Ajaka", (i.e. one who fights everywhere, on account of his proclivities and his being fond of adventures). He volunteered to go and fetch some wherever procurable.

Having been away for many years and not heard of, the aged sire and every one else despaired of his ever coming back; so the King divided his property amongst the remaining grown-up children. Although the Alado (king of Benin) was the eldest, the Oloyo was the most beloved, and to him he gave the land, and told him to scour it all over, and settle nowhere till he came to a slippery place, and there make his abode; hence the term "Oyo" (slippery) and thus Oyos are such slippery customers! After they had all gone and settled in their respective localities, all unexpectedly, the young adventurer turned up with water from the sea!

The monarch made use of it as per prescription and regained his sight! Hence, the Ijesas who subsequently became his subjects are sometimes termed "Omo Obokun", children of the brine procurer. Having distributed all his property, he had nothing left for Ajaka. He therefore gave him a sword lying by his side with leave to attack any of his brothers, especially the Alara or Alado, and possess himself of their wealth, but should he fail, to retire back to him; hence the appellation "Owa Ajaka Onida Raharaha" (Owa the ubiquitous fighter, a man with a devastating sword). The Owa Ajaka settled a little way from his grandfather, and on one occasion he paid him a visit, and found him sitting alone with his crown on his head and — out of sheer wantonness — he cut off some of the crown's fringes with his sword. The old man was enraged by this act, and swore that he would never wear a crown with fringes on.

The Aregbajo was one of those who had a crown given to him, but the Owa Ajaka, paying him a visit on one occasion, saw it, and took it away, and never returned it. As a result, the kings of Igbajo never wear a crown to this day. The Owa also attacked the Olojudo and defeated him, and took possession of his crown; but he never put it on. On every public occasion however, it used to be carried before him. This continued to be the case until all the clans became independent.

The Owa's mother, when married as a young bride, was placed under the care of the mother of the Oloyo, hence the Alaafin of Oyo often regarded the Owa as his own son. The Orangun of Ila and the Alara of Ara were his brothers of the same mother. The Ooni of Ife was not a son of the Olofin, but the son of a female slave of his whom he offered in sacrifice. The Olofin kept the boy always by him, and when he sent away his sons, this little boy took great care of him and managed his household affairs well until his death. When the Oloyo succeeded his grandfather, he authorised the boy to have charge of the palace and the village, and he sent to notify his brothers of this appointment. So whenever it was asked who was in charge of the house, the answer invariably was "Omo Oluwo ni" (It is the son of the sacrificial victim). This has been contracted to the term Ooni.

The Owa and his brothers used to pay the Alaafin annual visits, with presents of firewood, fine locally-made mats, kola nuts and bitter kolas; the Owore of Otun with sweet water from a cool spring at Otun — this water the Alaafin first spills on the ground as a libation before performing any ceremonies. The other Ekiti kings used also to take with them suitable presents as each could afford, and bring away lavish presents from their elder brother. This Ajaka subsequently became the first Owa of the Ijesas.

== Institutions in Ilesa ==
=== Ilesa Grammar school ===
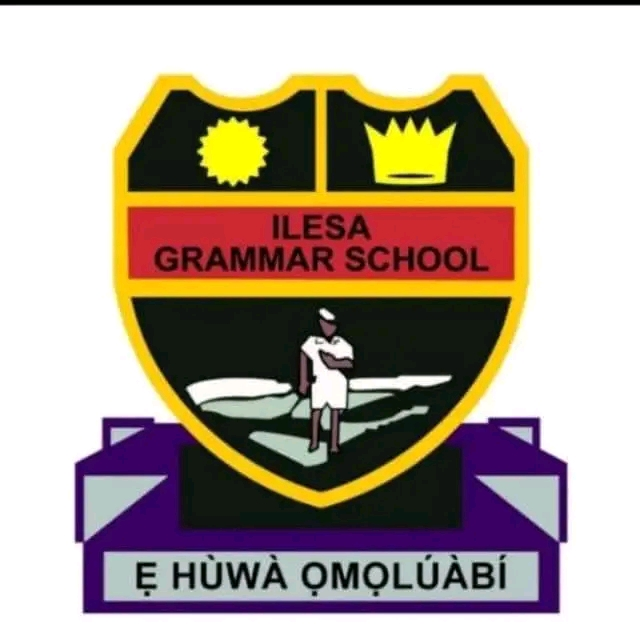

One of the grammar schools in Ilesa is Ilesa Grammar School. Its 90th anniversary was celebrated in 2024.

=== University of Ilesa ===
University of Ilesa formerly known as College of Education, Ilesa, was established on March 31, 2022 by the former governor of Osun State Alhaji Adegboyega Oyetola. It was upgraded to a University by Governor Ademola Adeleke who set up a review committee to ascertain the establishment of the institution.

=== College of Health Technology ===
Among the schools in Ilesa is the College of Technology, which is located at Imelu in Ilesa.

== Hospital in ilesa ==
There are several Hospitals in ilesa city which are.

- Wesley Guide hospital Ilesa, located in bolorunduro street Ilesa.
- Wesley Guide hospital (Obafemi Awolowo Teaching hospital located in oke Ayose Ilesa.
- Oba Adenle Memorial hospital
- living petals medical center.

== Colonial assessment ==
The village was described by the Rev. William Howard Clark in 1854 in the following manner: "For its cleanliness, regularity in breadth and width, and the straightness of its streets, the ancient village of Ilesa far surpasses any native town I have seen in black Africa."

== The Ijesa Monarchs ==
There are four royal houses amongst which accession to the throne is supposed to be rotated: Biladu, Bilagbayo, Bilaro and Bilayirere. Rulers, under the title of Owa Obokun Adimula, have been as follows:

Owa Ajibogun	1150- 1255
Owa Owaka Okile	1260-1358
Owa Obarabara Olokun Eshin	1360-1459
Owa Owari	1466 - 1522
Owa Owaluse	1522 - 1526
Owa Atakumosa	1526- 1546
Owa Obokun Oge-	1572-1587
Owa Obokun Bilayi- Arere	1588- 1590
Owa Obokun- Yeyeladegba(Female)	1646 - 1652
Owa Obokun -Yeyegunrogbo(Female)	1652-1653
Owa Obokun Biladu I	1653- 1681
Owa Obokun Biladu II	-
Owa Obokun Bilaro	1681-1690
Owa Obokun Waji(female)	1691-1692
Owa Obokun Waiye (female)	1692-1693
Owa Obokun Waiyero(female)	1698-1712
Owa Obokun Bilagbayo	1713-1733
Owa Obokun Ori-Abejoyo(female)	1734-1749
Owa Obokun Bilajagodo “Arijelesin"	1749-1771
Owa Obokun Bilatutu"Otutu bi Osin"	1772-1776
Owa Obokun Bilasa"Asa abodofunfun"	1776-1788
Owa Obokun Akesan	1789-1795
Owa Obokun Bilajara	1796-1803
Owa Obokun Odundun	1804-1814
Owa Obokun Obara	1814-1832
Owa Obokun Gbega-aje	1832-1846
Owa Obokun Ofokutu	1846-1858
Owa Obokun Aponlese	1858-1867
Owa Obokun Alobe	1867-1868
Owa Obokun Agunlejika 1	1868-1869
Owa Obokun Owewe-niye	1869-1874
Owa Obokun Adimula Agunloye-bi-Oyinbo "Bepolonun	1875 - 1893
Owa Alowolodu	Mar 1893 - Nov 1894
Owa Obokun Alowolodu	1894-1895
Owa Obokun Ajimoko 1	April 1896- September 1901
Owa Obokun Ataiyero[Atayero]	1902-1920
Owa Obokun Aromolaran 1	1920-1942
Ajimoko "Haastrup" -Regent	1942 - 10 Sep 1942
Ajimoko II "Fidipote"	1942-1956
J. E. Awodiya -Regent	18 Oct 1956 - 1957
Owa Obokun Biladu III "Fiwajoye" Ogunmokun 111	1957-1963
... -Regent	Jul 1963 - 1966
Owa Obokun Agunlejika 11	1966-1981
Owa Obokun Gabriel Adekunle Aromolaran II	1982-2024
Owa Obokun Clement Adesuyi Haastrup	2024-

== Climate/Weather ==
In Ilesa, the wet season is oppressive, overcast, and warm and the dry season is muggy, hot, and partly overcast.

== Notable people ==
- T. M. Aluko OBE OON
- Akinloye Akinyemi: Nigerian major
- Samuel Olatunde Fadahunsi: Commander of the Order of Niger, CON and President of the Council for the Regulation of Engineering in Nigeria (COREN)
- Kayode Eso: Justice of the Supreme Court of Nigeria (an Odole Gidigbi Faloju descendant)
- Bolaji Akinyemi: Nigerian Minister of Foreign Affairs and a professor of political science
- Moses Olaiya: comedian (also known as Baba Sala)
- Ogbeni Rauf Aregbesola: Governor of Osun State
