= Strut Records =

British record label

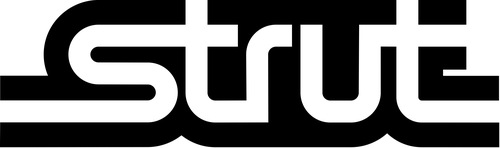
- Founded: 1999
- Founder: Quinton Scott
- Genre: Funk, Soul music, Disco, World, Dance music, Afrobeat
- Country of origin: United Kingdom
- Location: London
- Official website: strut-records.co.uk

Strut Records is a British record label that started in 1999. The label focuses on releasing dance music, jazz and afrobeat including artists Patrice Rushen, Sun Ra Arkestra and Mulatu Astatke.

== History ==
The label was "acquired and re-launched in January 2008." The label website states that "from 1999-2003, the label became renowned for its uncompromising high quality packages documenting landmarks in the history of dance music from Italo disco, Calypso, Afrobeat and beyond". From 1999 to 2003 "Strut was one of the UK's leading record labels dedicated to unearthing the lost gems of dance music past, covering music from hard funk, underground disco, original breaks and Nigerian Afrobeat to old skool hip hop and forgotten music library classics." "Set up in 1999 to document important areas of dance music's history, Strut's releases cut no corners, bringing together killer dancefloor tracks as well as giving a full context to the music, telling the story of the characters behind the tunes, the clubs and the scene of the time." "The albums are mastered from original tapes wherever possible and feature extensive sleevenotes, researched and written by respected journalists, rare photographs and memorabilia."

In 2008 Strut & Gold Dust Media joined the !K7 label group, which today is best known for producing electronic music artists and especially for the DJ-Kicks compilations. Between 1999 and 2003, Strut released everything from Nigerian Afrobeat to left field disco to rare groove. The release of Grandmaster Flash's new album also took place this year. Strut's founder, Quinton Scott, is responsible for A&R. Gold Dust Media is A&R'd from the US office of !K7 and will focus mainly on American artists.

As of 2017, Strut serves as !K7's reissue label, including recordings by Patrice Rushen and Miriam Makeba.

One group signed to the label is Ottawa-based Souljazz Orchestra.

In 2019, Strut celebrates its 20th anniversary by re-pressing some of their best releases (Disco Not Disco, Patrice Rushen) or adding new episodes in compilations series (Nigeria 70).
