= Adimula Agunloye-bi-Oyinbo "Bepolonun" =

Yoruba king (ruled 1875–1893)

Owa Obokun Adimula Agunloye-bi-Oyinbo "Bepolonun" was a 1st Class Yoruba king from the Ijeshaland. He ruled from 1875 to 1893 in a period that witnessed many wars. He also saw the end of the Kiriji War at Imesi-ile and the return of the Ijesha people to Ilesa in 1893. He stems from the Aromolaran-Bepo Royal Family of the ancient Bilauodo Royal House . He was one of the most prominent kings directly involved in the Kiriji War alongside the Alaafin of Oyo empire and Ooni of Ife . All of these kings alongside the prominent war generals of the Kiriji War signed the infamous Kiriji War peace treaty in which the Owa Obokun declared via official proclamation that the Alaafin of Oyo was not his subordinate but his brother and equal this statement was one of the events that ended the war .
