= Ijesha =

Sub-ethnicity of the Yorubas of West Africa

Ìjẹ̀ṣà
Total population
- ~ 2,312,660

Regions with significant populations
- · Osun State: 1,230,339 (2024) · Ilesha West: 205,986 · Ilesha East: 208,700 · Atakunmosa East: 148,708 · Atakunmosa West: 148,541 · Oriade: 290,072 · Obokun: 228,332 · Benin Republic: 400,001 · Ekiti State: · Okemesi: 93,244 · Lagos State: 682,320.

Languages
- Yoruba (Ìjẹ̀ṣà)

Religion
- Christianity · Islam · Yoruba religion

Related ethnic groups
- Èkìtì, Ifẹ̀, Ọ̀yọ́, other Yoruba people

The Ijesha (Yoruba alphabet: Ìjẹ̀ṣà [ìd͡ʒɛ̀ʃà] or Ùjẹ̀ṣà [ùd͡ʒɛ̀ʃà]) are one of the major sub-groups of the Yoruba people of West Africa. Ilesha is the largest town and historic cultural capital of the Ijesha people, and is home to a large kingdom of the same name, ruled by a King titled as his Imperial Majesty, the Owa Obokun Adimula of Ijesaland. The Prince Clement Adesuyi Haastrup from the Bilaro Oluodo Ruling House succeeds the now late Oba Gabriel Adekunle Aromolaran, as the 49th Owa Obokun of Ijesaland. However there is much contention as the Osun State Government and Prince Clement Adesuyi Haastrup violated a court injunction that said no king is to be chosen until the court case has been settled which was made a week before his controversial and likely illegal selection.The Haastrup family is an ancient prominent family of Yoruba Extraction who have bore millionaires, a deputy governor and a Supreme Court Judge. All Kings of Ijesaland are among the few paramount rulers and most prominent kings of the Yoruba Race extending to Nigeria, Benin, Togo, Ghana and the South Americas (where they are known as Lucumí). This prominence is due to the founder of the Ijesas being Owa Ajibogun who is the direct son of Oduduwa, the Royal Yoruba progenitor and god-king of the Yoruba people.

== Geography ==
Ijeshaland is located at latitude 8.92°N and Longitude 3.42°E. It lies in a forested region at the heart of the Yoruba country, west of the Effon ridge which separate the Ijeshas from the Ekitis to their east, and at the intersection of roads from Ile-Ife, Oshogbo, Ado Ekiti and Akure. The Ijesa cultural area presently covers six local government councils within Osun state and Okemesi currently the headquarter of Okemesi/Ido-ile LCDA in Ekiti State of Nigeria. The Ijesa however have lost a lot of land due to wars and separation in the 19th century . Many people in Ekiti State have very similar origins to the Ijesa and are thought to have close familial relations to the Ijesa people .

The Ijesha territory is adjoined by the Ekiti on the east, the Igbomina to the north, the Ife to the south, and the Oyo and Ibolo to the west.

The nationally famous Olumirin waterfalls, more popularly known as Erin-Odo Ijesha Waterfalls is located in Ijeshaland.

Ijeshaland is rich in Gold and has the largest deposit in Nigeria. It is currently estimated to have 5 billion US dollars' worth of Gold in the Ilesa Gold Belt.

== History ==
The word Ìjèsà is said to originate from the idea of "eating with the Gods (Orisha)." The people were devoted Orisha worshippers and were known for frequently celebrating festivals, feasting, and honouring their deities — hence the description "those who eat the Orisha’s food." . The Ijesha may have lost some territory to their neighbours during various conflicts and wars of the nineteenth and preceding centuries. The people of Oke-Ako, Irele, Omuo-Oke are said to speak a dialect similar to Ijesha.

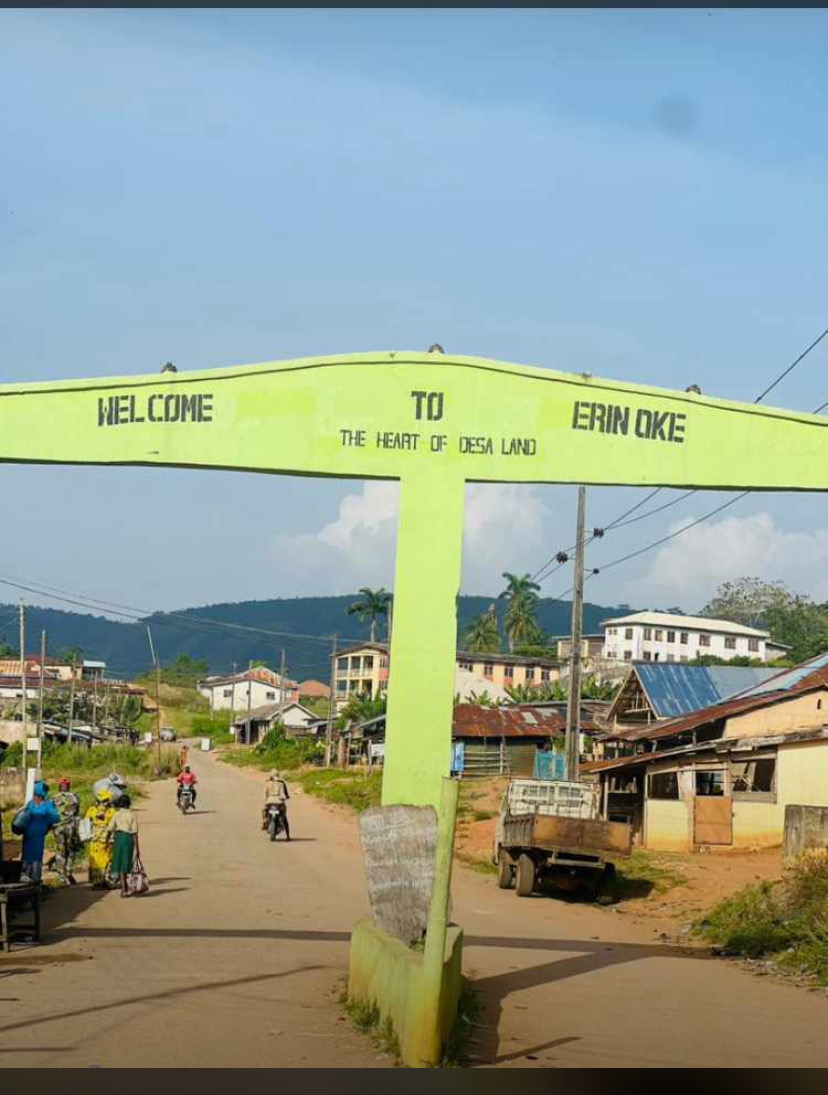
This is the entrance gate of Erin Oke - The Heart Of Ijeșa land

== Ilesa ==
The city state of Ilesa (Ile ti a sa, which means "a homeland we chose") is the traditional headquarters of Ijesaland. It was founded in c.1250 by Owaluse, a grandson of Ajibogun Ajaka Owa Obokun Onida Arara, one of the most accomplished great-grandsons of Oduduwa, the royal progenitor of the Yoruba race of South-Western Nigeria, Benin Republic and Togo. His father became mysteriously blind and Ifa concluded that he has to wash his eyes with sea water to be able to see again. Owa volunteered and got the water from the sea hence the name Owa-Obokun . The city was described by Rev. William Howard Clark in 1854 as:

For its cleanliness, regularity in breadth and width, and the straightness of its streets, the ancient city of Ilesa far surpasses any native town I have seen in black Africa.

== The Ilesa royal families ==
The Ilesa royal claim descent from Oba Oduduwa by way of Ajibogun. The dynasty has also contributed to the development of other powerful kingdoms in Yorubaland. The ruling houses of the Akure Kingdom, for example, claim descent from the Owas by way of Princess Owawejokun, a daughter of Owa Atakunmosa.

The rulers of the Kingdom have been:

The ruler's title: Owa Obokun Adimula
Owa Ajibogun	1100 A.D
Owa Owaka Okile	1260 - 1358 A.D
Owa Obarabara Olokun Eshin	1360 - 1459 A.D
Owa Owari	1466 - 1522
Owa Owaluse	1522 - 1526
Owa Atakunmosa	1526 - 1546
Owa Bilayiarere	1588 - 1590
Yeyeladegba	1646 - 1652
Yeyegunrogbo	1652 - 1653
Owa Biladu I	1653 - 1681
Owa Bilaro I	1681 - 1690
Yeyewaji	1691 - 1692
Owa Waiye	1692 - 1693
Owa Wayero	1698 - 1712
Owa Bilagbayo	1713 - 1733
Yeyeori	1734 - 1749
Owa Bilajagodo	1749 - 1771
Owa Bilatutu "Otutu bi Osin"	1772 - 1776
Owa Bilasa "Asa abodofunfun"	1776 - 1788
Owa Akesan	1789 - 1795
Owa Bilajara	1796 - 1803
Owa Odundun	1804 – 1814
Owa Obara "Bilajila"	1814–1832
Owa Gbegbaaje	1832–1846
Owa Ofokutu	1846 – 1858
Ariyasunle (1st time) -Regent	1839
Owa Ofokutu	1839–1853
Ariyasunle (2nd time) -Regent	1853
Owa Aponlese	1858 –1867
Owa Alobe	1867 – 1868
Owa Agunlejika I	1868 - 1869
Vacant	4 Jun 1870 - 1871
Owa Oweweniye (1st time)	1871–1873
Vacant	1873
Oweweniye (2nd time)	1873–1874
Owa Adimula Agunloye-bi-Oyinbo "Bepolonun"	1875 - 1893
Owa Alowolodu	Mar 1894 - Nov 1895
Vacant	Nov 1894 - Apr 1896
Owa Ajimoko I	Apr 1896 - Sep 1901
Owa Ataiyero	1902–1920
Owa Oduyomade Aromolaran I	June 1920– July 31, 1942
Ajimoko "Haastrup" - Regent	1942 - 10 Sep 1942
Ajimoko II "Fidipote"	10 Sep 1942 - 18 Oct 1956
J. E. Awodiya - Regent	18 Oct 1956 - 1957
Owa Biladu III "Fiwajoye"	1957 - Jul 1963
.Ogunmokun... - Regent	Jul 1963 - 1966
Owa Peter Adeniran Olatunji Agunlejika II	1966–1981
Owa Gabriel Adekunle Aromolaran II	February 20, 1982 – September 11, 2024
Owa Adesuyi Haastrup "Ajimoko III"	December 27, 2024 -
