= Osun State House of Assembly =

Legislative arm of the government of Osun State of Nigeria

The Osun State House of Assembly is the legislative arm of the government of Osun State of Nigeria. It is a unicameral legislature with 26 members elected from the 30 local government areas of the state known as state constituencies. In some places two local government areas are merged to form a single state constituency. This makes the number of legislators in the Osun State House of Assembly 26.

The fundamental functions of the Assembly are to enact new laws, amend or repeal existing laws and oversight of the executive. Members of the assembly are elected for a term of four years concurrent with federal legislators (Senate and House of Representatives). The state assembly convenes three times a week (Tuesdays, Wednesdays and Thursdays) in the assembly complex within the state capital, Osogbo.

The Current speaker of the 8th Osun State House of Assembly is RT. Hon. Prince Adewale Egbedun.
