= List of villages in Ekiti State =

This is a list of villages and settlements in Ekiti State, Nigeria organised by local government area (LGA) and district/area (with postal codes also given).

== By postal code ==
LGA	District / Area	Postal code	Villages
Ado Ekiti	Ado Ekiti	360101	Ago Araromi; Ajebamidele; Aso Ayegbule; Ategbado; Igim Okogo; Oke Epa
Ado Ekiti	Kajola	360102	Ago Aduloju; Amirin; Ernfun; Igirigiri; Ika; Ikewo; Ilokun; Iranse; Ireje; Oke-Aso
Efon	Efon-Alaaye	362104	Abeta; Agboro; Aladura; Alagba Mesan; Alawaye; Araromi; Etisun; Ido Ajegunle; Igbo Aba; Irunshin; Ita Awure; Ita Ido; Iwaji; Oba Ayetoro; Obake; Oke Agemo; Oko Adagba; Orisunbare; Oro
Ekiti East	Isinbode-Ekiti	370105	Eremiji Camp; Igbole; Suru Camp
Ekiti East	Omuo Ekiti (Rural)	370104	Araromi; Ikun-Oba; Ilasa; Oda Do
Ekiti South-West	Igbara Odo Ekiti	360105	Aba Oshodi; Bolorunduro
Ekiti South-West	Ilawe	360103	Igunurin; Ilupeju; Oke-Ijebu
Ekiti South-West	Ogotun	360104	(Ogotun); (Osogbo); Aba Adedeji Village; Aba Edunabon; Aba Ibadan; Aba Iragbiji; Aba Osunrin; Aba Petu; Aba Tiamiyu; Abakona; Aiyedade (Aba Ijesa); Ajamuro Hamlet; Alabameta; Alagbede; Araromi (Olorooko); Ayedarade/Omi Ogun; Bolorunduro (Edetedo); Edetode; Hamlet; Ilupeju, Ajebandele; Johnson Camp; Kajola Village; Lawrence Camp; Oluwabusola Hamlet; Omu-aran Camp; Orisunbare Temidire; Otapaete Ogotun Hamlet; Temidire Alagbade
Ekiti West	Igbemo	362107	Aba Igbira; Aba Ire Rd; Aba Ita Iroro; Afao Ekti; Araromi Obo; Are Ekiti; Iropora
Ekiti West	Igede	362105	Aba Egbira; Ajebamidele; Ayeye; Iloba Igedera; Odo Uro
Ekiti West	Iyin	362106	Aba Igbira; Aba Ojumu; Esure Ekiti; Iropora
Emure	Emure	361104	Aba Adewale; Aba Adeyemo; Aba Ajiboye; Aba Ajireni; Aba Amin; Aba lade; Adeboye; Agbanimu; Ago Sasere; Ajebandele; Akeye; Alabamarum; Alapoto; Amuroko; Anaye; Ayelala; Ba Egin; Ba Ojilo; Emure Ekiti; Eporo Ekiti; Ibeji Adu (Aro I); Ibeji Adu (Aro II); Ibeji Owode Oniyawa; Ibeji Shittu; Ibeji Shittu II; Idi Ope; Igbo Owa (Old Emure Settlement); Igboso; Ilu Oge; Oke Seri; Oke Sett; Omaje; Opticum; Ose; Owode; Owosi; Owosi Oba; Oyimo Settlement; Sasere; Ugbo Uso
Gbonyin	Agbado-Ekiti	370107	Agbingbin Camp; Ipole-Agbado; Omuo Camp
Gbonyin	Aisegba-Ekiti	370108	Aba Anifowose; Aba Ikare; Aburumoku Camp; Aguda Camp; Bolorunduru; Edemo Camp; Ikare Olorunda; Iro-Ayeteju; Oka Camp; Olokemeji Camp; Sanni 1; Sanni 11
Gbonyin	Egbe-Ekiti	370106	Adadiri/Loye; Adekaye; Agbonkoji; Agunbi Aka; Baba Egbe; Dan Site Settlement; Igbegede
Gbonyin	Ijan Ekiti	370109	Ilupeju Ijan; Oyan/Ologboo Camp
Gbonyin	Iluomuba-Ekiti	370110	Aduloju Camp; Asereo/Ariala; Asota Camp; Ayetoro/Adebayo; Bolorunduro Camp; Igbira Okoroko; Isakunmi Camp; Jubril Camp; Kosoo Lare; Odilowo; Oke Ede/Oluke; Oshogbo Farm Sett; Owode Imesi; Sabere/Ita; Sedu Camp
Ido Osi	Akufo/Idigba/ Araromi	200130	Abaoko Esu; Abigbinde; Adegbite; Agubi; Ajibade; Akindele; Akinware; Akinware/Asoju Sangote; Akinyanran; Akufo; Alajata; Alapata; Alarabo; Aleeyan; Apata; Araromi; Batake; Eboade; Elesinfunfun; Fagbogo; Idi Oro; Idiya; Ile Tuntun; Ladimeji; Ladunni; Latayo; Morakinyo; Ojeniran; Okedina; Okeowo; Okunsinde Otun; Olawoyin; Olokogboro; Olonwe; Oloode; Omojoro; Onigbinde; Onikonko; Onisago; Opaeye; Owolabi; Oyawole; Pakuru; Tokan; Yidi
Ido Osi	Ido	200129	Aba Emo; Aba Oke; Adelogun; Adesekun; Akerele; Akilo; Akindeji; Akowooloti; Alako; Apete; Awotan; Ayegun; Baale; Dada; Elere; Eleyele; Erinwusi; Fasan; Iddo; Idi-Amu; Idi-Igbaro; Idi-Oro Elewa; Ijaybbawo; Ilaju; Keeditan; Koguo; Langbin; Latunji; Odebode; Oderemi; Odetola; Ogunrinde; Oguo; Okunnawo; Oloro; Onigbodogi; Onikanga; Onikede; Oniuu; Saliu; Sango; Sinko
Ido Osi	Ido Ekiti	371101	Ayetoro Ekiti; Igbole Ekiti; Ilogbo Ekiti; Osi Ekiti; Usi Ekiti
Ido Osi	Ifaki	371103	Igbira Camp; Ipole; Obaji; Odo Oba-Aladesusi; Okalawa; Oke Ese; Osi; Temigbola
Ido Osi	Omi Adio	200131	Aba Araba; Abidogun; Abiona; Agbopo; Ajobo; Akankan; Alade; Alakoso; Ami Adio; Anisere; Apaoyin; Atere; Baako; Bakatari; Balogun Alawusa; Bode-gbo; Egannarin; Elenusonso; Eleso; Faleye; Falogun; Fenwa; Idi-Ahouna; Kuye; Lasokun/Araromi; Odo-Ona; Odufemi; Oganla; Ogundele-Alaho; Oke-Alaro; Oloka; Oloko; Oloya; Oloye-Oyekan; Oloyo; Omowunmi; Onidoko; Onigbagbo; Salako; Siba; Tade
Ido Osi	Orin-Ekiti	371102	Aaye Ekiti; Ifisin-Ekiti; Ilogun; Odo-Ora; Oke-Ora; Ora-Ekiti
Ijero	Ayegunle-Ekiti	372108	Idao; Ilukuno; Iroko; Temidire
Ijero	Ijero-Ekiti	372101	Aba-Owa Ajero; Abatuntun; Abedi; Aboro; Ajebandele; Ajeje; Arun; Balaloro; Boriowo; Eyigbo; Irapa; Jubili; Odo Oye; Odo-Ese; OkeAsa Farm-Stead; Okelogbo; Okoto; Ologbodudu; Saloro
Ijero	Ikoro	372104	Ajioku; Arapate; Epe; Iparako; Kajola; Kanga & Alatarite; Lare; Odo Ikoro; Oke Ogboni; Oke Oja; Oke Oko; Olosun; Osan; Osun; Otun; Panu; Saloro; Soso
Ijero	Iloro Ekiti	372109	Ijurin; Iloro
Ijero	Ipoti-Ekiti	372103	Ajana Owa; Amilede; Ijero Rd; Ile Olope Rd; Iloro Rd; Oke Adefila; Oke Eisinkin; Omolewa; Surulere, Babasale, Oyikaka, Oluwaseun, Alabari,
Ijero	Odo Owo	372102	Afale; Ara; Ayegunle Rd; Baba Orioke; College Rd; Epe; Epe Rd; Ijero Rd; Iloro; Ipoti Rd; Oke Igi
Ikere	Agama	361102	Aba Akyejo; Aba Ayewa; Aso-Osolo; Atoka; Oke Aso; Okejegbende; Oniroba
Ikere	Ikere - Ekiti (Rural)	361101	Aba Arokun; Aba Ayede; Aba Igbira; Agamo; Ugbo-Iyan; Ugbo-Oje; Ugbo-Uro
Ikole	Ijesa-Isu	370102	Adebayo; Adewumi Camp; Agere; Ajileye; Apadie; Ariyo Camp; Ikoyi-Ile; Ire; Omu-Aran
Ikole	Ikole	370101	Aba Alagbado; Aba Alakelu; Aba Alawe; Aba Alayan; Aba Aworo Epin; Aba Idemo; Aba Igomina; Aba Ikare; Aba Ipin; Aba Iran; Aba Isiaka; Aba Iyere; Aba Odofiu; Aba Oke Illabo; Aba Oloringbo; Aba Onireke; Aba Uro; Abamera; Adeleye Camp; Ara; Araromi; Arie Camp; Asunrin Village; Awara Camp; Ayebode; Bolorunduro; Ekun Camp; Eleju Idofin; Eti Oyo; Igbo Imosun; Igboroko; Ikoyin Ile; Isun Oniyere; Iwetin Camp; Iya Camp; Odo - Ona Camp; Odo Ugo; Odo- Ayedun; Ogbungbun Camp; Oke - Ayedun; Oke Ale; Oke Orin; Ologburugburu Camp; Omi Ugba; Omopintan Village; Saromi II; Saw Mill; Ugb Iha; Ugbo Omo; Utake
Ikole	Oke-Ako	370103	Alani; Asamo; Ayo-Isolo; Idiake; Igbo-Edun; Ipao; Irele; Itapaji; Obadan; Ologunro Camp; Osusana; Oyi
Ilejemeje	Erinmope	372105	Ayeoja; Igogo; Ikun; Kosu
Ilejemeje	Iye	372106	Eda Oniyo; Ewu; Iludun; Ipere; Iye; Ijesa Modu; Obada
Ise/Orun	Ise/Orun	361103	Aba Adeja; Aba Ado; Aba Corner; Aba Ebira; Aba Ede; Aba Eye; Aba Ikare-Idi Osan; Aba Ikire; Aba Ilogbo; Aba Odole; Aba Olisa Camp; Aba Olokemeta; Aba Omoto-Aran Camp; Aba Omuaran; Aba Onisu; Aba Osi; Aba Paanu; Aba Pojo Camp; Aborowa Akande Camp; Ada Camp; Afolu Camp; Agbe; Ajebamidele Camp; Ajebamidele Ilofa Camp; Ajegunle Camp; Alabi Camp; Alagbada Camp; Araromi; Aratu Camp 1 & others; Aro Camp; Arola Camp; Asalu Camp; Bolorunduro Camp; Borowa Camp; Egin Camp; Egunjobi Camp; Ekan I; Eke-mode Camp; Ese Camp; Fatoba Camp; Idi Osan; Igbira Ese; Imope; Ita nla Camp; Kajola Camp; Morupa; Obada Camp Odofin Camp; Odolo; Ofigba; Ogbese Camp; Oge; Ogunleye Camp; Oguntuase Camp; Ojomu Camp; Okuta Aaragba; Olagunju; Olofe Cap; Olotin Camp; Olu-Oroke; Orisumibare Camp; Oshogbo Camp; Oye Araromi Camp; Oyin; Salaja CampSasere Camp; Temidire Camp 1; Temidire Camp 11
Moba	Aramoko	362101	Egede; Isokowa; Itape; Kajola; Orokuta; Osemo; Willys Camp
Moba	Erinjiyan	362102	Ajebamidele; Ayetoro; Ikogosi; Ileyigbo; Ipole; Ipole-soke; Ireju; Kajola; Osun
Moba	Okemesi	362103	Alaye; Aworo; Elesunsun; Erio; Ido Ajinmare; Ido-Ayefunle; Oko-Owa; Ologunde; Popo-Oba
Moba	Otun Ekiti	372107	Epe; Ira; Iro; Isaoye; Osan; Osun; Otun
Oye	Ayede	371106	Egbu; Ijelu; Ilafon; Ilemose; Isan; Iyemero; Oloje; Omuo-Odo
Oye	Ayegbaju	371105	Agaba; Igbara Camp; Igbkorodo; Itaji; Luke Dada; Ojuola; Olomolowa; Otaipe
Oye	Imesi Ekiti	370112	Aba Apeye; Aba Apomo; Aba Aseta; Aba Bolorunduro; Aba Ogbe; Aba Oke; Aba Pabanbari; Aba Sakunmi
Oye	Ode Ekiti	370111	Ekiti; Villages under Ode
Oye	Oye	371104	Aba Asua; Ajegunl; Aldejobi; Apata-Ajo; Ayelala; Elewuro; Ilupeju; Ire; Itapa; Kajola; Modamoro; Odogba; Okeiyin; Old Oye; Olutumode

== By electoral ward ==
Below is a list of polling units, including villages and schools, organised by electoral ward.

LGA	Ward	Polling unit name
Ado Ekiti	Ado 'A' Idofin	In Front Of Ude's House / Ogbon Igbara, Idofin St.; A. U. D. Pry. Sch. / Iro St., Ode Ona; A. U. D. Pry. Sch. / Odo Imobun; In Front Of Adeluyi's House / Araromi, Adeluyi'S, Thadeus Compound; In Front Of Father Blessing 's House / Agric. Elejoka's Comp.; Ori Ekiti Market / Asa Ejemua Comp.; St. Patrick Pry. Sch. Matthew St. / Ilaro, Mathew; In Front Of Odofin's House / Odofin Comp.; In Front Of Egbedi's House / Egbedi's Comp.; In Front Of Faeji's House / Faeji's Comp.; In Front Of Pa Jegede's House / Chief Emila's Comp.
Ado Ekiti	Ado 'B' Inisa	In Front Of Oisa Family's House / Oisa, Oke Inisa Comp.; In Front Of Chief Elemo's Comp. / Odo Inisa/Eminio Comp.; In Front Of Ejemu's Comp. / Ejemu, Aralopon Comp.; At Odo Ado Market Area / Odo Ado Market, Iyere; In Front Of Asamo's Compound / Isao Isamo Compound; Around Orimolade / Ejemu's House, Ejelu Ilegemo Comp.; In Front Of Aremo's Palace / Iremo Area; At Odo Ado Grammar Sch. / Ado Grammar Sch.; St. Pauls Ang. Pry. Sch. / Owode; Old Yarwer Comp. / Adesokan, Igirigiri Rd.; At The Back Of Odo Ado Dispensary / Olorunsogo Ayinsola Comp.; St. Pauls Ang. Pry. Sch. / Owode Comp.
Ado Ekiti	Ado 'C' Idolofin	In Front Of Olowoyo's House / Olowoyo Comp.; St. David's Pry Sch. Osun / Oke Igbala, Olumakinde Comp.; At Elere Comp. / Elere Comp.; In Front Of Aiyinrinsin Comp. / Aiyirinsin, Imayo Comp.; St. George's Pry. Sch. / Ologunsunja; St. George's Pry. Sch. / Orode; In Front Of Edemo's Comp. / Edemo Egunlusi Comp.; In Front Of Elewere's Comp. / Elewere Ogunremi's Comp.; In Front Of Elewere's Comp. / Elewere; St. George's Pry. Sch. / Alaketu Lawani Comp.; Anglican Pry. School / Idemo, Araromi; 24, Owolabi's House / Owolabi's Comp.; In Front Of Mr. Ogunrinde's House / Olokemeji's Comp.
Ado Ekiti	Ado 'D' Ijigbo	St. Micheal Pry. Sch. Bk. I / Water Wks. Area I; St. Micheal Pry. Sch. Bk. II / Water Wks. Area II; Open Space At Imugbagba Mkt. / Egunlusi Comp.; In Front Of Omesi Medicine Store / Olokun Comp.; In Front Of Sansayin's House / Sansayin, Omogame, Basorun Comp.; At The Back Of High Life Hotel / Ejemu, Elomoba Comp.; Poly Bus Stop, Ijigbo Round About / Chief Ejigbo Compound Babatola; St. James Pry. Sch. / Ekute Area; In Front Of Adetade Hosp. / Oke Bola Area; Opp. Maria Asumpta Hosp. / Ureje Area; Owena Bus- Stop, Opp. Little By Little / Owena Bank Area; A. U. D. Pry. Sch. Bk. I / Old Barracks Area; A. U. D. Pry. Sch. Bk. II / Ibukun Olu Area; Oke Oniyo Market / Oke Oniyo, Oke Alafia Area; St. Pauls C. A. C. Opp. Total / St. Pauls C. A. C., Ajilosun; In Front Of Pa Lawal's House / Oke Age St.; In Front Of Alaja Aduloju's House / Ibitoye Aduloju Comp.; In Front Of Oluropora's House / Omolayo Area
Ado Ekiti	Ado 'E' Ijoka	At Odo Otu Area / Odo Otu; Near Slaughter Slab / Slaughter Slab; In Front Of Elejoka's Palace / Ijoka Area; Near Odu's Comp. House / Odu's Comp. House I; Near Odu's Comp. House / Odu's Comp. House II; Fajuyi Great Hall / Igbamote, Aafin Area; Erekesan Shopping Comp. / Erekesan Market; In Front Of Aafin / Old Town Hall Area; Near New Motor Park Area; Mary Immaculate Area / Orereowu St. Area; In Front Of Adesina's Comp. / Agbowu; In Front Of Chief Aribi's House / Agumo Area I; In Front Of Faleye's House / Agumo Area II; In Front Of Eki Cinema / Eki Cinema; In Front Of Rawa Comp. / Ologunsikin; Beside Tokunbo Clinic / Apempe
Ado Ekiti	Ado 'F' Okeyinmi	In Front Of Owolabi's Comp. / Olugbaye's Comp.; By Left Side Of Machanical Workshop, Igbaletere/Adejugbe's Comp.; In Front Of Pa Adesina 's Comp. / Adesina's Comp.; In Front Of Chief Adeleye's House / Olurasa Comp.; In Front Of Eleyinmi' S House Eleyinmi's Compound; In Front Of Chief Adeparusi's House / Ferebute; L. A. Pry. Sch., Okeyinmi / Okeyinmi; In Front Of Old Council / Odogun Area; A. U. D. Pry. Sch., Okeyinmi / Odofin's Comp.
Ado Ekiti	Ado 'G' Oke Ila	In Front Of Late Sarumi's House / Erio, Balemo Area; Federal Housing Estate, Oke Ila / Federal Housing Estate; In Front Of Oduro's Comp. / Oduro Edemo Comp.; St. Andrew's Pry Sch. / Olowopetu; St. Anderew's Pry. Sch. /Bello Baba Egbe; In Front Of Philip Esan's House / Philip Esan; In Front Of Akungbe Philips / Akungbe Olora Comp.; Mary Immaculate Pry. Sch. / Ogundipe, Olora, Elemukansi; In Front Of Asale's House / Alararori, Asale, Saliu Comp.; In Front Of Chief Ika's House / Ika Village; In Front Of Olu's Palace / Irasa Village; In Front Of Chief Ilado's House / Ilado Village; In Front Of Oretuyi's House / Iso Village; Open Space At Ikereoko / Ikereoko
Ado Ekiti	Ado 'H' Ereguru	In Front Of Major Ilukun's House / Ilukun Comp. Area; In Front Of Aderiye's House / Adelabu Aderiye's Comp.; In Front Of Famujimi's House / Famujimi Obatimehin; In Front Of Falegan's House / Falegan Akinyemi; Eleyowo Market / Odoba, Gidado; At The Back Of Jubilee Hotel / Odundun; In Front Of Ologunese's House /Eleyowo, Orimolade, Ologunese; In Front Of Ejemua's House / Ejemua; In Front Of Adeyinka's House / Adeyinka, Jimba; Grade A Court / Asagidigbi, Adebiyi, Ogbon Oba, Post Office; In Front Of Ibikunle's House / Ibikunle Abiodun; By The Left Side Of Ogunleye's House / Ogunleye; In Front Of Lawal's House / Ogbon Ado; L. A. Pry. Sch. / Akomolede, Eyedofin, Eyebusola; Infront Of Fasula's House /Fasula; At The Back Of Omosio's House / Alafia, Ereguru, Omosio; In Front Of Akinlusi's House / Ojumose, Akinlusi; At The Back Of Okoli's House / Oke Agbe, Ojumose Area; In Front Of Elegbira's House / Elegbira; In Front Of Iginla's House / Iginla, Adegbite; L. A. Pry Sch. / Eyedofin, Eyebusola
Ado Ekiti	Ado 'I' Dallimore	In Front Of Pa Jegede 's House / Jegede, Adehun; In Front Of Omolayo's House / Omolayo; In Front Of Adebayo's Estate / Adebayo Estate; Between Eyejari, Melody's House / Prince Melody St.; In Front Of Alaworoko's House / Olojaese Comp - Bello; In Front Of Ajitadidun Pry. Sch. / Chief Olora's Comp. I; At The Back Of Ajitadidun Pry. Sch. / Chief Olora's Comp. II; In Front Of State Hospital / State Hospital; In Front Of Dr. Akeju's House, Beside Alagbonmefa; Emmanuel Pry. Sch. / Comm. Centre; Open Space, Pa Otokute's House / Stadium Area; L. A. Pry. Sch., Olobe / Adamolekun, Obayemi; In Front Of Abe's House / Odundun; In Front Of Eleyowo's Market / Temidire; In Front Of Late Akinbo's House / Oke Ese; In Front Of Pa Jonathan's House / Ogbon Oyo; Infront Of Baisanya's House / Baisanya Adebomi; In Front Of Adeparusi' S House / Adeparusi Comp.; In Front Of Babatunde's House Christ Sch.; Surajudeen Sch. / Surajudeen School I; Opopogboro Comp. / Surajudeen Sch. II; University Comp. / University; Open Space At Ilokun Tent / Igbira Elemi
Ado Ekiti	Ado 'J' Okesa	Opposite High Court / G. R. A., Police I; Set Mango Area / G. R. A., Police II; At The Back Of Christ The King High Sch. (C. K. C.) Yinka Agbebi's Comp.; At Olorokori's Comp. /Olorokori; At Olokundulu's Comp. / Olokun; In Front Of Osaluyi's House / Oke Agbe Area, Ademisola; In Front Of Fajuyi's House / Fajuyi, Okesa; In Front Of Elemudu's Comp. / Elemudu's Comp.; In Front Of Adegoke's House / Adegoke, Ojumose; Opp. Okoli Supermarket / Araromi St. Olofin; Behind Asa's House / Asa Comp.; Opp. Texitile Factory / Textile I; Opp. Bishop's House Road / Texitile II; Methodist Sch / Basiri I; In Front Of Dele Ilori's House/ Basiri II; Methodist Sch. / Basiri III; Better Life Area / Basiri IV; In Front Of St. Geogery's Hospital (Okurume) Basiri V
Ado Ekiti	Ado 'K' Irona	Ang. Pry. Sch., Atundaolu, Irona / Akerele Ajimo Comp.; St. Thomas Pry. Sch., Irona, At Akogun Comp. / St. Thomas Sch.; St. Thomas Pry. Sch., Irona, / Odoloro, Olode Comp.; At Baptist Sch./ Akinyede's Comp.; Samo Onikasanmi / Samo Onikasanmi; A. U. D. Pry. Sch., Irona / Aapalowo, Pa Folarin; In Front Of Onikoro's House / Onikoro Comp.; In Front Of Micho Tailor / Oloro Comp.; Opp. Micho Hotel, Irona / Eruwon Comp.; Opp. Cocoa Store / Ajipona Area; In Front Of Karim's House / Surulere Area; Ado Community Grammar Sch. / Ado Community Grammar Sch. Area; Ola Oluwa Grammar / Ola Oluwa, Adewunmi Comp.; C. A. C. Gramm. Sch. / Ola Oluwa II; At Ali's Comp. / Ali's Comp.; At Akogun's Comp. / Olode Comp.
Ado Ekiti	Ado 'L' Igbehin	Around Sasere 's Comp. / Sasere's Comp.; In Front Of Fakorede's House / Fakorede's Comp.; Pa Famuyibo's House / Famuyibo; Pa Ologbosere's House / Ologbosere's Comp.; Around Adu's House / Jimba Omoaluko; Around U. A. C. Shop, Anisulowo / Arowa Comp.; In Front Of Pa Ogundipe's House / Adigun; At Ogbon Omo Area I / Ogbon Omo Comp.; In Front Of Arowa's House / Erekesan Post Office; At Asasa Comp. / Asasa
Ado Ekiti	Ado 'M' Farm Settlement	At Camp (Ila Nla) / Itanla; At Okerepa Camp./ Oke Epa; At Oke Aso Comp. / Oke Aso; At Amujagba / Amujagba; Oke Osun Area / Oke Osun; At Olora Comp. / Olora Comp.; At Ademiluyi Comp. / Ademiluyi's Comp.; At Ajebamidele Comp. / Ajebamidele; Adugbokun Comp. / Adugbokun; Odo Pry. Sch. / Odo Village; In Front Of Aba Alaga / Ifesowapo; In Front Of Adepoju's House / Idegbe; Igimokogo Pry. Sch. / Igimokogo; At Ategbado Village / Reserve Village; At Italaoro Camp. / Italaoro Comp.; In Front Of Sedu's House / Ita Eku; In Front Of Momodu's Comp. / Omi Oloko; At Unity Sec. Sch. / Erinfun / Unity Sec. Sch. Ireje; Pry. Sch., Ago Igbira, Erinfun / Erinfun; Pry. Sch., Igirigiri / Ayoko, Igirigiri; In Front Of Adubiaro Comp. / Emirin; Federal Polt. Comp. / Fed. Poly, Ago Ologunja; Pry. Sch. Ago Aduloju / Ago Adugbokun, Aduloju; Pry. Sch., Igbogun/ Igbogun Village; Pry. Sch. Ago Ayegunle / Ago Ayegunle, Ago Araromi; In Front Of Omosio's Comp. / Kajola
Efon	Efon I	Oku Tajuroje Ijoka; Near Amoripota House - Ayetoro; Agemo's House - Ayetoro; Near Olowokere's House - Ilogbo; Ijoko - Ijoko; Erekesan Aafin Town Hall; Igando Junction - Igando
Efon	Efon II	In Front Of Pa Ojo's House - Inisa I; Behind Water Works - Inisa II; Near Oluwamakin's House - Iberikodo I; Open Place At Iberikodo - Iberikodo II; Front Of Fayomade House - Itamesi; Near Oni's House - Ilu Gbeku; Front Of Chief Onisape House – Ogbon – Aro; In Front Of Ojabalu Afolayan's House
Efon	Efon III	In Front Of Egbekunle's House - Apare; St. Patrick's Sch. I - Isaja; St. Patrick's Sch. II - Isaja; Front Of Ola's House - Ogbontitun; Front Of Aje Ijofi - Ijofi; Front Of Olobo's House - Itaosun; Front Of Oladapo's House - Walemisoro; Motor Park - Idagba I; Front Of Bello's House - Idagba II; Front Of Gbada's House - Idagba III
Efon	Efon IV	Alawaye Pry. Sch. - Alawaye Camp; Near Ogundugba House - Owode I; Near Ogundugba House - Owode II; Igbooye Farm - Igbooye; Itawure B/S - Itawure; C. A. C. Grammar Sch - Ita Odo; Demonstration Primary School Igbo Eegun; Front Of Diamond Filling Station - Alagbamesan; St. Peter's Ang. Sch. - Odi Olowo I; St. Peter's Ang. Sch. - Odi Olowo II; Community Pry. Sch. - Alajo; Erugbua Settlement - Oniyo; Open Palace At Ita Ido - Ita Ido; C. A. C. Pry. Sch. - Ido Ayegunle; Open Place At Sugboun - Sugboun; C. A. C. Pry. Sch. - Aladura
Efon	Efon V	In Front Of Chief Asosanyin Hse - Baruwa; Oisa Ejigan Comp. - Ejigan; Our Saviour Pry Sch. - Ayetoro / Odoamo; Ft. Of Oteniya's Hse- Orere Udo I; Near Oteniya's Hse - Orere Udo II; Ft. Of Awe's Hse - Iluji; Nr. Ch. Alahun's House - Oke Ahun; Ft. Of Ayodele's House Hse - Oke Ifa; Front Of Olodifin 's Hse - Ita Odo Uro; Near Apoti's House - Ita Oo; Ft. Ologunde's House Ijio / Ibete; Abeta Pry. Sch. - Abeta / Oroo; Near Oguniyi's House - Obake; A. U. D. Pry. Sch. - Orisunbare; Saberedowo Olorogbo; Open Place At Ijao - Ijao; Near Chief Elemo's House - Atiba; Ft. Of Ezekiel House - Ibase
Efon	Efon VI	Near Aladejare's House - Oke Isegun I; Near Aladejare's House - Oke Isegun II; Front. Of Sayo's House - Igbo Olofin I; Bolarinwa's Hut - Igbo Olofin II; Near Babatope's House - Ilosi I; St. Stephens P/S - Ilosi II; Near Olufe's House - Isaba; Near Omole's House - Ikiran I; Irunsin Farm - Irunsin I; Irunsin Farm - Irunsin II; Near Chief Elemo House - Ilero; Behind Olajubu's House - Ibase; Oluji Farm Junction - Igboaba
Efon	Efon VII	Near Dabi's House - Iberikodo; Near Oloruneto's - Atiba; Near Akanle's House - Iparatiba; Elemo's House - Ilemo; Front Of Olowoyeye - Imoba I; Obalola's Comp. - Imoba II; Near Ologunde's House - Obaloja I; Near Ologunde's House - Obaloja II; Front Of Erugbua's House - Ilogbodun; Near Oguntuase's House - Iloja
Efon	Efon VIII	Front Of Saketu's House - Ojodi I; Front Of Fakunle's House - Ojodi II; Front Of Ogunleye's House Igbehin; Front Of Ewelusi House - Iloja; Front Of Ojubu's House - Ikagbe; Front Of Olugbenga's House - Iloya; C. And S. Pry. Sch. - Alanaka I; C. And S. Pry. Sch. - Alanaka II; Front Of Olosi's House - Igbo Olofin; Pry. Sch. Iwaji - Iwaji; Oyo Camp. - Olomowewe; Oisa Olosi - Owagbon's Camp
Efon	Efon IX	Front Of Afeni's House - Igbehin I; Front Of Balogun's House - Isare I; Front Of Adeniran's House - Isare II; Front Of Baptist Church, Imolekere; Near Pastor Asaju House - Iloro I; Behind Alafia Clinic - Iloro II; Front Of Ayodele's House - Iloro East; Front Of Oisa Olosi's House - Igbehin II; Opposite Dispensary - Iloro East II
Efon	Efon X	Front Of Ajibola's House - Irayo I; Front Of Alayo's House - Irayo I; Front Of Babalola's House - Olorunsogo; Front Of Odewale's House - Alanka; Alagijin’S House; Near Orosun / Oloyin House - Iloro II; Osolo’S Camp Araromi; St. Joseph Pry. Sch. - Oke Ayo I; Near Oluwadare's House - Oke Ayo II; Oke Are Field - Oke Are I; Oke Are Field - Oke Are II; Obayetoro Pry. Sch. - Oko Adagba; Onirice - Aba Onirice; Oloja Igbajo Comp. - Oloja Igbajo; Near Chief Aro Hut - Olalubi; Elemo's House Elemo Farm
Ekiti East	Omuo - Oke I	Ayegunle St. / Ayegunle; Aragba St. / Okelebojo / Ilebojo I; Aragba St. / Okelebojo / Ilebojo II; Beside St. / Okelebojo / Aragba Odolebojo; A. U. D. Pry. Sch. / Oke Are / Ebidore; Oke Afin S. / Oke Afin; Emoba Hall / Oke Afin; Surulere St. / Okebola / Surulere
Ekiti East	Omuo Oke II	St. Silas School II / Ebiogidi; St. Silas II Pry. Sch. / Ebiogidi II; Igbale St. Igbale; Oke Sasa St. / Oke Sasa / Akasa; Okeringun St./ Odo Atiba / Didi Okeringun; Omuo Oke / Ajire Town Hall - Odo Ejio / Olorunsogo; Odo - Ejio St. / Odo Ejio / Olorunsogo; Onijoji St. / Igbemisi; St. Silas Pry. Sch. / Oba Otitiju Road; Erinjo St. / Erinju / Odo Elegun
Ekiti East	Araromi Omuo	Infront Of Agidimo House / Igo; Beside Ezekiel, House Iroro / Ita Alafia / Iroro Imegun; Infront Of Ezekiel's House Iroro / Ita Alafia Iroro Imegun; Kajola St. / Kajola; Town Hall Araromi / Odoyi I; Town Hall Araromi / Odoyi II; Ekurugbe St. / Ekurugbe / Iwada
Ekiti East	Kota I	Methodist Pry Sch., Kota - Isaya; Isaya Street - Isaya; Market Stall - Isaya Kota; Elemoso / Agbarabata - Elemoso / Agbarabata; Ujah Town Hall - Ujah I; Ujah Town Hall - Ujah II; Alaafia Street / Alaafia; Irafun St. - Irafun; Temidire / Eleje St. - Temidire/ Eleje
Ekiti East	Kota II	Methodist Pry. Sch. - Igbede; Mayokun St. - Igbede; Oda -Pona St. - Oda Pona; Ilisa Oke - Ilisa Oke; Bolorunduro - Bolorunduro / Obajoda I; Bolorunduro - Bolorunduro / Obajoda II
Ekiti East	Obadore I	Front Of Asoberedowo's House - Edugbe; Town Hall - Edugbe; Ekurugbe Town Hall- Ekuregbe; S. D. A. Pry. Sch. - Ijero I; S. D. A. Pry. Sch. - Ijero II; Town Hall - Iremo; Market Stall, Ijero - Temidire
Ekiti East	Obadore II	Maternity Centre - Alage; Ita Balogun / Ayagbolu; Oke - Gbala St. / Aluta / Oke Gbala; Town Hall Iworo / Ayaosun I; Town Hall Iworo / Ayaosun II; Ayauma St. / Ayauma; Aro St. / Aro
Ekiti East	Obadore III	C. A. C. Pry. Sch. Ilisa / Apoge / Ilisa; Okebola Street / Okebola; Okebola Street / Okebola I; Okebola Street / Okebola II; Olisa St. / Ajila; Methodist Pry. Sch., Ilisa Adumari I; Methodist Pry. Sch., Ilisa Adumari II; Court Hall / Aafin
Ekiti East	Obadore IV	Omuo Comp. High Sch. / Oya / G. R. A.; St. Andrews Pry. Sch., Iludofin / Aya Oye; Ayaalafe St. / Aya Alafe / Teledalase; St. Mary Pry. Sch. / Iloro; Front Of Fatoyinbo's House / Odi Olowo; Late Oloda's Frontage / Oda Odo; Ayedun Street / Oruji / Ayedun; Baba Egbe's House / Odo Uro / Odo Ule; Beside Baba Egbe's /Odo Uro / Odo Ule (At The Front Of Odofin's House); Oruju Town Hall / Oruju
Ekiti East	Ilasa I	Oke Oniyo St. / Oke Oniyo; St. Philips Pry Sch./Oke Oniyo; Ago Igbira / Ago Igbira; Iremo St./ Iremo; Ekamefa / Ayegunle; St. Anthony's Pry. Sch. / Ibajore; Co- Operative Hall / Igbale; Igbale St. / Igbale; St. Pauls Pry. Sch. / Eda Ile
Ekiti East	Ilasa II / Ikun / Araromi	Ilado St. / Ilado / Ogbo Owa; Iregun St./ Iregun; Isolo St. / Oke Odo - Isolo; Iro St. / Iro I; Iro St. / Iro II; Fiditi St. / Fiditi; Okorokoro / Okorokoro; Frontage Of Oladipo's House / Ikun; Oba' S Palace / Araromi
Ekiti East	Isinbode	St. Andrews Pry. Sch. / Ilaro Abilogbo; Cow Buthers Place / Market Area / Egidi; St. Anthony's Pry. Sch. / Ekuye / Oke-Eku; Market Place / Aba Baale / Aba Oremeji; Market Place - Market Stall
Ekiti West	Aramoko I	St. Philips's B / Anaye I; Omoalara Hall, Anaye II; Infront Of Chief Ojoko's House, Anaye III; Open Space Within Anaye, Anaye IV; St. Anne's Sch, Isasa I; Town Hall, Isasa II; Town Hall, Isasa III; Mr. Akeju's House, Alakowe; In Front Of Chief Imi's House, Idifi; Atiba Palace, Atiba; Near Odofin's House, Iwaro / Ijowa / Surulere; Near Chief Sajowa's House, Sajowa; Maternity Centre, Iwaro / Ijelu I; Maternity Centre, Iwaro / Ijelu II; Baptist Pry. Sch. / Alele; Infront Of Chief Okunato's House, Ikunato; St. Joseph's C. A. C. Pry. Sch., Oke Egbe; In Front Of Chief Asasa's House, Ayinrin Oyewunmi; Odole's Comp., Akingbolu Comp. / Odole; Oke Obo / Oke Asasa, Oke- Obo Comp. Oko Asasa; Front Of Okoro Agunsimi House, Odo Ayo Alakowe; In Front Of R. A. Shitu's House, Amututu; Market Square, Alele
Ekiti West	Aramoko II	In Front Of Aboluwarin 's House, Ilao I; At Lion's Bus - Stop, Ilao II; Front Of Chief Asao, Isao I; Egbewa, Isao II; Front Of Ologbudu House, Isao III; Front Of Ayodeji's House, Isao IV; Mekejo Near Odan, Isao V; Front Of Famubode's House Odo Oloro, Isao VI; Front Of Fasanmi's House, Oke Eso; Front Of Chief Eleyinmi's House, Oke Ayo 1; Near Chief Fola Alade's House, Oke Ayo II; Opp. Finance Office, Ijoko; St. Stephens Pry. Sch., Ilure; At Market Square, Isalu I; Near Olajubu's House, Isalu II; Near Ojo Ogun'S, Isalu III; Idoka, Idoka; At Saw Mill Stall, Egbewa I; Near Elekasomi's House, Egbewa II; Fasanmi's Comp., Egbewa III; At Adico Comp., Igemo; Eyinloye's Farm Settlement, Odo Isan; A. U. D. Pry. Sch., Oke Oja I; Near S. Alaja's House, Oke Oja II; At Town Hall, Oke Oja III; Near Abu Bakare's House, Oke Aja IV; Front Of Chief Ologbodo's House, Oke Uro; Front Of Fakanle House, Aluwaya; Apamu Farm Settlement, Apamu
Ekiti West	Aramoko III / Erio	Community Pry. Sch., Ile Ona I; Front Of Amodu Agbabiaka's House, Ile Ona II; Front Of Ajagungbala's House, Ajaye Oke; Front Of Joseph Ilesanmi's House, Ajaye Odo; Elejofi's Farm, Temidire; Community Pry. Sch., Ajebamidele; Near Baale Lamidi, Surulere Oke Oja; Community Sch., Kajola / Kajola Oke Oja; Pry. Sch. Akola, Okola; Open Space Within Alafe, Temidire, Temidire Alafe; L. A. Pry. Sch., Surulere Oke Oja; Front Of Baale's House, Orisunbare Camp; Front Of Post Office, Obada; Front Of Ibuoye, Irokin / Ibuoye; Idiora Squre, Ibala I; Front Of Olajubu House, Ibala II; Front Of Oyewumi's House, Ilopo / Araromi / Iyere I; Space Within Ilopo / Araromi, Ilopo / Araromi / Iyere II; Front Of Odofin 's House, Olutoru / Temidire / Balogun I; Space Within Olutoru, Temidire And Balogun, Olutoru / Temidire / Balogun 11; Front Of Esan Nig. Ltd., Olobarabara / Alafia; Front Of Elder Obiwale's House, Odo Ayo / Education; Front Of Oluwa Nifise's House, Ayio / Oluwanifise; A. U. D. Pry. Sch., Odomu / Idito; Elerio Farm, Awure / Odo Igbana Farm; Chief Olojegbe Farm, Olojegbe Farm
Ekiti West	Erijiyan I	Near Ologbehin Comp, Igbehin I; Okemore, Igbehin II; Front Of Adeyemi's House, Atiba; Near Oba's Palace Erekeji, Oguna I; Town Hall, Oguna II; Odofin's Comp., Igemo III; Osolo's Comp. Igemo I; R. C. M. I, Igemo II; Ajebamidele Pry. Sch., Ajebamidele; Ogboru, Surulere; A. U. D. Pry. Sch., A. U. D. Area; Osomo's Comp., Ilofi; C. A. C. Pry. Sch. C. A. C. Pry. Sch.; Kajola Sq, Okemogun, Kajola 1; Kajola, Erejirin, Kajola II; Front Of Akingbade's House, Oketere
Ekiti West	Erijiyan II	Maternity Center, Iwaro I; Oloje's Camp, Iwaro II; Anglican L. A., Igbehin; Orisunmbare Camp. Orisunmabre; Ireju Camp., Ireju / Oyomokore; Front Of Eleyigbo's House, Oke Idi Ogun
Ekiti West	Ikogosi	Front Of Elerigbe, Erigbe; Chief Onisan Frontage, Oji; Frontage Of Oyebanji's Comp. Okelele; Idigbo Street, Inija / Odogbo; Baptist Pry. Sch., Ilajumu I / Ilajumu II; Ademilua Comp., Ikogosi W. S.; Ori Okuta, Oriokuta / Temidire /Asa; Aba Osun Farm, Babatola / Aba Osun; John Kolawole House, Alaje Camp
Ekiti West	Ipole Iloro	Inuta Centre, Inuta I; Inuta East Inuta II; C. A. C. Pry. Sch., Inuta III/ Maternity; Kajola Squre, Kajola; Iwaji Squre, Iwaji I; St. Bridget, Pry. Sch. Iwaji II; Ijoko Squre, Ijoko /Oke Ogun; Odo Oja, Odo Oja; Ijale Oke, Ijale I; Odo Ijale, Ijale II; Iloro, Iloro; Idi -Ose, Ijale Centre; Front Of Lamidi Agbede's Hs. Araromi Settlement
Ekiti West	Okemesi I	Near Adeniran's Camp, Sagunrin; Olomofe Comp., Odo Ese I; Front Of Oluwaniyi, Odofin Comp.; St. Micheal Pry. Sch., Okeloro / Lejoka; Front Of Obanla Afuye's House, Popoola 's Comp.; Omiragunsin's House, Odowo Dofin I; Aworogun's Comp., Odowo Dofin II; Balogun's House, Ajindo I; Open Space Within Ajindo, Ajindo 11; Ogundele's House, Legiri; Egbeja Araromi, Egbeja Araromi / Egbeja Baba Egbe; Epinrin Golu, Epinrin / Idiroko; Ogborogodo, Ogborogodo; Oke Owode, Oke Owode; Ago Paanu Village, Ago Paanu; Alamo, Alamo Lagburugudu; Lagburugudu, Lagburugudu; Epinmi Kasia, Epinmi Kasia; Ejemu Hall, Oke Iloro / Ejemu; Front Ariyibi's House, Ajagemo (Latunde)
Ekiti West	Okemesi II	Front Of Akinleye's House, Emile; L. A. Pry. Sch., Asagba; At Akodi Osodi, Osodi; At Akudi Odunmurin, Odunmurin I; Space Within Odunmurin, Odunmurin II; Front Of Babaowa 's House, Irobabaowa; At Osolo Hall, Osolo; Front Of Olaletan's House, Balogun I; Open Space Within Balogun Area, Balogun II; At Akodi Sajuku, Sajuku; At Obalara Hall, Obalara's Comp.; Front Of Ekunola's House, Mayorun; Front Of Ajibade's House, Iro Oke; Front Of Legiri Ogundele's House, Legiri - Ogundele; At Lejua Hall, Lejua; Oba Odo Hall, Oba Odo / Lerio; Front Of Chief Odole's House, Odole / Esorun; Front Of Saloro House, Alaka / Aniye
Ekiti West	Okemesi III	Town Hall, Aafin; Front Of Sunday Obaleko's Comp., Otio; Front Of Adetoyinbo's House, Ijana I; At Akodi Aro, Aro / Saba; Front Of Emiloju's House, Ijana I; Space Within Ijana, Ijana II; At Akodi Obalogbo, Obalogbo; Ita Ode Squre, Ita Ode; Akegun Camp., Akegun Village; Ogborodudu Square, Ogborodudu; Oko Aro Square, Oko Aro; Kamodi Camp, Kamodi Camp
Ekiti West	Ido Ajinare	Ajinare Gram, Ojogbe I; Old Model Sch, Ojogbe II; Court Hall, Aafin; Front Of Jeje's House, Elu Oke Pele; Front Of Olaletan House, Ogunremo; Front Of Chief Amole, Orin; Front Of Orisaomu, Oroke; Odomu Squre, Odomu; Front Of Chief Odofin Omu House, Oke Omu; Front Of Chief Adesola 's House, Oro Street; Front Of Chief Oloye's House, Oke Oye; St. Andrew's Sch, / Odogbo
Ekiti South West	Ilawe I	Itaose / Oyegbata St. Angela's Sch.; Temidire / Catholic Mission St. Angela's Sch; Owailoro / Mat. Centre Near Owailopo; Igbo Awo / Chief Saro Near Igbo Awo; Emila, Near Emila; Elejofi / Ojaomo / Near Elejofi; Ilupeju Centre / Ilupeju Pry Sch; Erin Omo Food Centre / Near Erin Omo; Oja Aaye / Eku Aaye / Near Oloja Aaye; Sapetu / Near Sapetu; Owaosun / Tedio / Oloriawo Near Oloriawo; Owaosun / Tedio / Oloriawo Near Board Of Internal Revenue
Ekiti South West	Ilawe II	Temidire Durodola / St. Michael Pry. Sch.; Akomolafe / St. Michael Pry. Sch.; Ilesanmi / Abanigbele / Near Ilesanmis Ase; Oke Adura / Near Oke Adura; St. Michael / Araoye / At St. Michael Sch. I; St. Micheal / Araoye / At St. Michael Sch. II; Apelua /Amodi /At St. Michael Sch.; Araromi / Aroge / Asubiaro / At Araromi Market; Oyinlola / Oge/ Ororin / Oluwa Dunsin, Near Chief Asao's House; Oyinlola / Oge / Ororin / Oluwadunsin / Near Atoye's House; Oniwe / Alesin / Near Oniwe Road; Oja Omo /Near Oja Omo I; Oja Omo /Near Oja Omo II; Ejio / Subulade Near Ejio's House; Ejio / Subulade Near Anajere Market
Ekiti South West	Ilawe III	St. John's Road, At St. John's School; Ado Road, At St. John's School; Chief Agbajelola / Omiodo / At St. John's School; Alatoro / Okebedo / Near Alatoro; Ekuasa / Near Ekuasa; Igunmrin Community / Near Dispensary, Igunrin; Girigbomola, Near Girigbomola; Okeloye / Okebedo, At St. John's School; Idiagba / Ikereje / Oloro, Near Ikereje; Mogun / Ibiyemi, Near Ibiyemi; Odofin, Near Oisa Oke's House
Ekiti South West	Ilawe IV	A. U. D. Area At Better Life Centre; Erita / Ile Abiye / Chief Ejisun, At Ile Abiye Mat. Centre; Apelua, Near Apelua Compound; Mosque / Asamo / Onajobi / Akinyemi Near Onajobi; Mogun / Agbadaola Near Mogun; Ojugbese Near Ojugbese; Oloke Ego Near Oloke Ego; Oke Igbala Area Near Oke Igbala; Iloro / Ogboni / Ojumu Near Ogboni In Front Akinyemi's House; Oke Agbede Near Oke Agbede; Elewere Near Elewere; Iloro Area Near Ajila's House; Afunremu Area At Afunremu Pry School I; Afunremu Area At Afunremu Pry School II; Afunremu At Afunremu Pry. School
Ekiti South West	Ilawe V	Oke Adin / Durodola / At Holy Trinity School; Durodola / At Holy Trinity School; Oke Osun / Adele / At Holy Trinity School; Idi Ose / Alariko / At Holy Trinity School; Adin Area / At Holy Trinity School I; Adin Area / At Holy Trinity School II; Ojurongbe / At St. Mary' S School; Odole / At St. Mary's School; Oloja Adin / At St. Mary's School I; Oloja Adin / At St. Mary' S School II; C. C. C. Area At Produce Office; Onile Owo / Sajowa Compound At Pry. Health Centre
Ekiti South West	Ilawe VI	Ile Akogun / Ejimo Elesi / At Ejimo Hall; Ile Oisa / At L. A. Pry. School; Oke Afin / At L. A. Pry. School; Okelemo / Elemo / At Elemo Hall; Elejofi / Ausi / Elurin / At St. Patrick's School; Agbeluyi / At L. A. Pry. School; Faniku / Oluyemo / At St. Partick School; Elero / At Elero Hall; Osolo / At L. A. Pry. School; Asa / Obanla / Near Obanla; Ojuko / Near Ojuko; Ojuko / Near Elegbeleye's House; Omodara / Olomodulawe / Near Omodara
Ekiti South West	Ilawe VII	Onipa / Near Onipa's House; Onipa / Near Ajakaye's House; Okepa / Near Onipa; Okimi / Apadaba / Near Apadaba; Iro / Ejigbo / Near Ejigbo; Elemo Iro / At Irunja; Kajola Area / At C. A. M. C. School; Court Hall / Market / At Court Hall; Anglicans Church / At Town Hall; Okeloye / At St. Peter's School; Olanipekun / At St. Peters School
Ekiti South West	Igbara Odo I	Sapetu Area / Near Sapetu; Adebu / Olowofela / At St. James' School; Adebu / Olowofela / At St. Andrews' School; Elemo Are / At St. James' School; Elemo Are / Near Elemo's House; Sapetu / Igesa / At St. John's School; Obasoyin / At St. John's School; Surulere / At Community High School; Old Technical School / At Old Technical School; Oremeji / At St. John's School; Okeolua / At St. Andrews School; Itaporogun / At St. James' School; At Toluwani Nursery Pry. School / Toluwani Pry. School; Aro Balofin Near Aro; Erelu / At C/S School; Omiawo Near Chief Asao Ajisafe; Erelu / Omiawo At C/S School; Inipa / Bayeroju Co-Operative Store At Inipa; Petu/Oniya Comp At Coop Store; Petu / Oniya Comp. / At St. Peters School; Asebiomo / Ariyo / At St. Peters' School; Owode Area / At L. A. Pry. School; Olokun Comp. / At Cocoa Hall At Idiuja I; Olokun Comp. / At Cocoa Hall At Idiuja II; Agbele Comp. / At St. Marks' School; Obirokodo C / St. James' School; Elejoka Odigbo, St. James School
Ekiti South West	Igbara Odo II	Bolorunduro Farm / Primary School, Bolorunduro I; Bolorunduro Farm /Primary School, Bolorunduro II; Bolorunduro Farm / Primary School, Bolorunduro III; Ayetoro / At St. Paul' S School; Idiasa / At St. Paul' S School; Asan / At St. Paul' S School; Obarinmadun / Near F. Sekiteri's House I; Obarinmadun / Near F. Sekiteri's House II; Late Ayalodi Tewobola / Near Ayalodi Tewbola's House; Kajola / Olowofela / Near Ologungbede's House; Kajola / Olowofela / At St. Joseph' S C. A. C.; Oke Osun Near Tedela; Obatedo Area / At Co-Operative Store Opposite C. A. C.; Igbon / Arapate Near J. F. Fatoba; Igbon / Arapate Near Akereyemi's House; Aboluwodi / At St. Stephen' S Pry. School; Odo Ogba / At St. Stephens Pry School; Oke Odo / At St. Raphael School; Alarin Mokun / At St. Raphael's School; Araromi Oke Osodi / At St. Raphael's School; Oke Igbala Infront Of C. A. C. I; Oke Igbala Infront Of C. A. C. II; Itigi Area Near Itigi; Osodi Compound Near Itigi; Idi Ose / Osukotu Near Idi Ose Market; Idi Ose / Osukoti Sapeye Hall; Elegiri / Balogun Ige Near Adeyemi's House; Elegiri / Balogun Ige Near Asamo's House; Asaran / Ojanbati St. Stephen's School I; Asaran / Ojanbati St. Stephen' S School II; Ologbodo / Abaja Beside Ologbodo Abaja; Gbamilayin / Afin Area Court Hall
Ekiti South West	Ogotun I	Ifakin Area / St. Thomas's School; Ifakin Area / Ajebamidele Pry. School I; Ifakin Area / Ajebamidele Pry. School II; Babatola / Near Babatola; Aba Ibadan / Ajebamidele Pry. School; Iloda Area / Near Iloda I; Iloda Area / Near Iloda II; Iloda Area / Near Iloda III; Iloda Area / Near Iloda IV; Omi Ogun / Near Omi Ogun; Elemo / Near Elemo; Ayedade Ogotun High School; Edetedo / Ilupeju Pry. School I; Edetedo / Ilupeju Pry. School II; Edetedo / Ilupeju Pry. School III; Ajebamidele / Ifelodun Pry. School I; Ajebamidele / Ifelodun Pry. School II; Kajola / Aba Baale / At Ifelodun Pry. School; Olorioko / Araromi / Araromi Pry. School I; Olorioko / Araromi / Araromi Pry. School II; Oshogbotedo / Ifeloju Pry. School I; Oshogbotedo / Ifeloju Pry. School II; Atanoko / Near Atanoko; Omuaran Village/ Community School / Bolorunduro
Ekiti South West	Ogotun II	Okemi I I / St. Batholomew; Okemi I II / St. Batholomew; Okemi I III / St. Batholomew; Okemi I IV / St. Batholomew; Okemi I V / St. Batholomew; Olowosile Area / Near Olowosile; Awopetu Area / Emanuel 's School; Otapete / Ajanimo / St Batholomew; Orisunbare Camp / St Paul's Pry. School; Iba Area I / Emmanuel School; Iba Area II / Emmanuel School; Ogunleye Area Nera Ogunleye's School; Elebedo Area / Emmanuel's School; Falana Area Court Hall; Aro's Compound / Emmanuel's C. A. C.; Edun Agbon / Emmanuel School
Emure	Odo - Emure I	St. Andrews Pry. School / Olojido / Aderibigbe / Obanimo; Near Badaru's House / Badaru; Near Okeya's House / Okeya; Near Alabo's House / Alabo's Compound; Co-Operative No I, / Orimo's Compound; Beside Amodu's Compound / Amodu's Compound; Near Kolawole's House / Kolawole Area; Near Asa's House / Atunwa's Compound
Emure	Odo - Emure II	Near Olajide's House / Olajide's Compound; Between Aro Edemo / Popoola Edemo; Near Edemo's House / Oyedapo / Aro / Edemo; Near Roman Catholic / Roman Catholic Church; Near Ajayi's House / Odo Ogodo
Emure	Odo - Emure III	At Sabo / Olokorun / Gbedu; Near Adesina Store / Peter Adesina Store Area; Near Ajiboye's Camp / Ibeji Ajiboye Camp; Old Modern School / Owoseni Area; Community Pry. School / Ibeji Eliju Ilori; Open Space Within Egbira Camp / Aba Egbira; Community Pry. School / Ibeji Shittu; At Adu Camp / Adu Camp; At Olobebe's Camp / Olobebe Camp
Emure	Odo - Emure IV	Owode / Owode; Near Ojumu's House / Ojumu Akeregun; Community Pry. School Okeseri Settlement / Okeseri Settlement I; Near Community Pry. School Okeseri Settlement / Okeseri Settlement II; Open Space At Alapoto / Alapoto Village; At Moyegun's Compund / Moyegun / Omotola / Elejoka; At Egbeda Camp / Egbeda / Ebenezer / Falodun; Ose Onija Camp / Ose Onija; Alaba Marun Pry. School / Alaba Marun / Alade
Emure	Oke Emure I	Aafin Town Hall / Aafin / Town Hall; Open Space At Sasere / Ajebamidele / Sasere; Near Ajireni Camp / Ajo / Ajiremi Camp; Beside Asake's House / Asake / Odoba's Compund; Near Rabiu Apesin's / Rabiu / Apesin / Aladura; Infront Of Post Office / Falayi / Dongo Compound; In Front Of Alade's House / Alade / Egunjobi's Compound; St. Pauls School / Kajola / Ogbontitun Area; Comp. Pry. School / Ogunda / Anaye / Adediran Camp; Open Space At Arigidi / Ayo / Arigidi Camp
Emure	Oke Emure II	At Islamic School / Oremeji / Oguntuase I; Near Islamic School / Oremeji / Oguntuase II; At Oligi / Oligi Compound; Near Osanyintile's House / Osanyintile; Near Dare Osere's House / Dare Osere Compound; Near Ojilo's House / Ojilo's Compound; Open Space Within Aba Egin / Aba Egin; Near Oloyi's House / Oloyi / Abegunde Compound; Oge Pry School / Igbo Oge Camp; Near Odoba / Elemure Camp / Odoba / Elemure; Open Space At Idiope / Idiope / Ogunse
Emure	Idamudu I	L. A. Primary School / Olorunda I; Near L. A. Primary School / Olorunda II; At Osunkoti / Osunkoti; Between Ogundoro And Ojumu's House / Ojumu; Near Adediran's House / Adediran's Compound; Near Ogundare's House / Imesi Market Area; Near Olatunji's House / Olatunji; Opposite Popoola's House / Alale's Compound; Opposite Popoola's House / Alao / Opoto's Compound; Infront Of Chief Oloje's House / Oloje Camp
Emure	Ida Mudu II	Opposite Ariya's Store / Orija I; Near Opposite Ariya's Store / Orija II; Oba Ariya's House / Abegunde's Compound; Kolade's House / Kolade's Compound; Apostolic Faith / Oke Ope I; Near Apostolic Faith / Oke Ope II; Oke Igbala / Oke Igbala; At St. Paul / Near St. Pauls
Emure	Ogbontioro I	Open Space Within Ajaka's Compound / Ajaka; Near Lawrence Adebayo's House / Obanifon; St. Patrict Catholic School / Popoola Akinola; Maternity Centre / Ajiboye's Compound; Fadeyi's Compound / Fadeyi's Compound; Beside Faweya's House / Uta Aragba; Sacred Hearth School / Chief Paul Oke's Compound; At Olotu's Compound / Olotu's Compound; At Oyinmo / Oyinmo Camp; Amuroko / Amuroko; St Peter's Pry. School / Elikanah Compound; Between Sapetu And Oladele / Sapetu / Oladele; At Court Hall / Ogunleye Comp.; Bayo Hare Oko's House / Ile Baba Egbe; Near Bayo Hare Oko's House, Bayo Hare Oko's Compound
Emure	Ogbontioro II	Beside Samuel Okeya's House / Oke Eporo I; Beside Samuel Okeya's House / Oke Eporo II; L. A. Pry. School / Odo Eporo I; L. A. Pry. School / Odo Eporo II; At Olute Compound / Olute Compound; Space At Reserve Opticon / Reserve Opticon / Agbelere Settlement; Open Space At Akeye / Akeye / Adeyemo Compound; Near Maternity / Oke Eporo
Gbonyin	Egbe / Iro	Aafin / Ilesa - Aafin; In Front Of Elekunga Compound Odua / Aso / Sije; Ifinmi Open Space Oke Egbe / Ifinmi; Agbonkoji - Agbonkoji I; Agbonkoji - Agbonkoji II; Karimu's Compound - Karimu's / Agunbade; Loye Camp - Loye / Igbegede; St. Luke's Primary School / Iro - Kajola / Ogotun / Ayeteju I; St. Luke's Primary School / Iro - Kajola / Ogotun / Ayeteju II; Market Stall - Iro Ayeteju / Oka Ife / Irukuku; In Front Of Baale's House - Baale / Ilaro / Ojere / Odu
Gbonyin	Ode I	In Front Of Osalusi's House - Kajola / Araromi I; In Front Of Osalusi's House - Kajola / Araromi II; Court Hall - Aafin / Kajola; Open Space At Eregunrun - Eregunrun I; Open Space At Ilokun - Ilogun; Baale House - Ilase / Omiegungun; Methodist Primary School / Ode High School / Ilakoto; Open Space At Surulere - Surulere / Igbalaye; Onala Junction - Onala / Igboenu
Gbonyin	Ode II	Onibedo Camp - Surulere Camp; Jeoba Camp - Jeoba Camp; Open Space At Oloye - Oloye / Ilusode; Open Space At Ibedo - Alaode / Ibedo; Market Stall - Ilugbepa / Oju Oja; Open Space At Idolofin - Idolofin / Odo Ode; Ogunlusi's House - Oke Oniyo / Kajola / Agamugo; St Mary's Primary School - Oke Oniyo / Araromi
Gbonyin	Ode III	St John's Catholic School - Aremo / Egidi I; St John's Catholic School - Aremo / Egidi II; Open Space At Ogunrode - Ogunrode; Open Space At Old Egbe Road - Old Egberoad; In Front Of Ilakoto - Ilakoto; In Front Of Ibirinde's House - Ifelodun; Motor Park - Fabo Olowojebu; In Front Of Oguntimehin House - Uro; Open Space At Asorikiti - Asorikiti
Gbonyin	Imesi	Market Stall - Idosere / Ilogbo / Aafin; Comm. Pry. Sch. - Olorunda / Oyira / Bolorunduro; Open Space At Itamojiro - Ariala / Kaba / Aseta / Itamojiro; Itaaluko - Kosomolate / Itaaluko; Open Space At Apeye - Akande / Oke Ose Apeye; St. James Primary School - Ijumu / Oke Ode/ Idogun / Apomo; St Francis Primary School - Isigun / Oka / Ieri; Open Space At Erunwa - Erunwa / Araromi; Open Space At Isakunmi - Isakunmi / Francis / Eshe /Odo Oro / Eledo; Odiolowo Camp - Alhaji / Odiolowo; Open Space At Oka Tedo - Okatedo / Ojo / Oriokuta; At Oke Ede - Oke Ede; Open Space At Odokun - Odokun
Gbonyin	Agbado	Open Space Within Aafin - Kajola / Aafin /Ifinmi; Maternity Centre - Surulere / Isanda; St Pauls Primary School - Araromi / Ibodi I; St Pauls Primary School - Araromi / Ibodi II; St. Paul's Primary School - Asatu / Isarun; At Oju Oja - Oju Oja / Obadore / Ayetoro I; At Oju Oja - Oju Oja / Obadore / Ayetoro II; Open Space At Emure - Emure; Upper Emmanuel Primary School - Ayegunle I; Lower Emmanuel Primary School - Ayegunle I; Ajeoku Camp - Ajeoku / Onisa Camp; Open Space At Aba Omuo Aba Emure / Aba Ikare; Community Primary School - Ejisun / Ologun; Odofin Camp - Odofin / Abodi; Open Space At Osingbusejisun/Agbamajiya
Gbonyin	Aisegba I	Open Space At Aafin - Aafin I; Open Space At Araromi - Araromi; St. Cyprian's Primary School - Temidire; Open Space At Alasurs - Osere / Alasura; Open Space At Irotedo - Irotedo; Open Space At Anifowose - Anifowose; Open Space At Ogbontuntun / Ogbontuntun
Gbonyin	Aisegba II	Open Space At Aba / Aba Omuaran; Open Space At Bolorunduro - Bolorunduro; Lower Holy Trinity Primary School - Ayegunle; Opposite Co-Operative Bank A. C. G. S. A.; Open Space At Arunwa - Baisa / Inisa / Arowa; Open Space At Odo Iro / Ajojo; Open Space At Sagbale - Sagbale
Gbonyin	Iluomoba	Ajebamidele Primary School - Ajebamidele; Open Space At Akola - Akola / Aduloju; Maternity Centre - Oba Isa / Iloro / Okenahun; Open Space At Aafin - Aafin Odo Egbe / Odo Iso; Open Space At Bolorunduro - Bolorunduro; St Peter's Primary School - Araromi / Ijoka / Ogbon Titun / Asa; Open Space At Ogbontintun - Adebayo Camp; Ayegunle Odo Iso / Surulere - Ayegunle / Odo Iso
Gbonyin	Ijan	Open Space At Ifon - Ifon; Odo Oye - Odo Oye / Ayedun I; Odo Oye - Odo Oye / Ayedun II; Open Space At Ikesan - Ikesan; Ogbon Omo - Ayingbe / Ogbontintun / Ogbon Omo I; Ogbon Omo - Ayingbe / Ogbontintun / Ogbon Omo II; Ogbon Omo - Ayingbe / Ogbontintun / Ogbon Omo III; Open Space At Ilupeju - Ilupeju I; Open Space At Ilupeju - Ilupeju II; Open Space At Imoru - Imoru / Ode Ijogun; Odundun Open Space - Odundun / King Palace; Open Space At Ologoji - Ezekiel / Ologoji; Open Space At Iyare - Iyare I; Open Space At Iyare - Iyare II; Open Space At Imomo - Imomo / Osomo
Ido / Osi	Ido I	Ejemu Compound, St John's Hall; Oke Doba / Court, Near Ayodele's House; A. U. D. Primary School I; A. U. D. Primary School II; Ogbon Eyindi, Street Benedict's School I; Ogbon Eyinde, Street Benedict School II; Fasulus / Ologeba's Compound, Near Fasula's House; Apanisile / Odoajana, Near Apanisile 's House; Oke Oja, Market Stall; Inisa, St. Near Asosanyin's House; Iyedi, Oke Aanu Primary School; Oke / Odo Iyedi, Near Olumoja's House; Hospital Road, Near Dekunlola's House I; Hospital Road, Near Dekunlola's House II; Osi Junction, Near Ayo Olugboye's House; Isape, Near Fasuyi's House; Erekesin / Banji's Near Banji's House; Ayegunle / Iseoluwa, Near Ifedun's House; Ayegunle, At Ise Oluwa Road
Ido / Osi	Ido II	Omodewa, Omodewa Primary School; Oke Are In Front Of Licensing Office; Idofin / Ilotin O/S Faleye's House; Odo Agbe / Onala, Agricultural Extension Office; Oke Sape, Methodist Primary School, Ido - Ekiti; Saloro's Compound, Near Saloro's House I; Saloro's Omu/Odo-Iro St. David's Pry. Sch.; Oke Bareke, Odo - Ido Primary School Ido Ekiti; Iloro, Near Akinyele's House; Imila, Apostolic School; Osasona's Compound Ajowa Primary School; Akorewolu, Coker Saw Mill Junction
Ido / Osi	Ifaki I	A . U. D. Primary School, Ewurin; Mr. Aderiye's House (Open Space); Methodist Primary School / Ilado / Iwore / Alupaja; St Peter's Primary School / Aduralere; Open Space In Front Of Atiba Market, Idi Ose; Egun Town Hall, Egun I; Near Egun, Egun II; Near The Palace, Palace Area
Ido / Osi	Ifaki II	C. A. C. Primary School / Ipara Olofin; Open Space Near Adebayo's House, Omi Oniyo; Idi/Ogun/Open Space Near Ojo J. K. House, Idi Ogun; Methodist Primary School, Ilogbe; Oke Ejelu, Oke Ejelu; Town Hall, Ogbon Iro; Vertinary Centre, Ilao; Saw Mill, Aremo Oshodi; Igbo Oloko/Near Chief Dada's House; Apiperekun Near Health Centre
Ido / Osi	Ilogbo	Ogunire / Idofin Abasa, Near Chief Lewa's House; Ile Elepa / Olua Near Ajayi's House; Ogbegun Alao Near Mr. Ogun's House; Odode Ile Eyebuntun I; Odode Ile Eyebuntun II; Enunrin, Near Enunrin's House; Okere / Esimo / Osolo, St. Mary's Catholic School; Eti Omi Area, St John's Anglican School; Oke Oja, Near, Ile Abaluare; Ile Olofin, Old Anglican Church; Imuta I, II, And III, Near Babatope's House; Eyigbo, C. A. C. Primary School; Aafin Area, Town Hall; Usi / Ido Road, Near New Bank; Surulere, A. U. D., Primary Sachool; Market Road, Area Market Stall; Temidire, Better Life
Ido / Osi	Usi	N. D. C. Area / Ayepe, N. D. C. Compound; Iworo I, C. A. C. Primary School I; Iworo I, C. A. C. Primary School II; Iworo II, Iworo Street; Oke Odi I, Near Anglican Church I; Oke Odi I, Near Anglican Church II; Oke Odi II, Upper Gate; Post Area Office, St Andrew's School; Usi High School / Usi High School; Oke Jebba Near Noble's House; Aafin / Aworo, Town Hall; Ona Omi Osun I And II, Near Adeide's House; Isimo Near, Ilori's House; Idiesi Area, Near Idi Esi; Idofin Near, Falodun's House; Unity Area, Unity Secondary School
Ido / Osi	Osi	Town Hall, Aafin I And II; St Paul's Primary School, Aafin III; Near Eleju's House, Temidayo; Near Egbedi's House, Inisa I; Near Odesanmii's House, Inisa II; Imodan Market, Imodan; Near Emila's House, Idofin; Methodist Primary School, Iwaro; R. C. M. Primary School, Eyinlata / Ejemusu; Near Oluare's House, Ijopa; Near Chief Oguntoyinbo's House Temidire; Near Chief Alaaye's House, Alaaye's Compound
Ido / Osi	Orin / Ora	Iletin I At Iletin; Iletin II Near Iletin; Ifaki Road, Methodist Primary School I; Ifaki Road, Methodist Primary School II; Awolowo Road, Market Stall; Farm Settlement, Farm Settlement; Ogbon Oja, Town Hall; Palace Area, St John's Catholic School; Iwoye I / Iwoye Hall; Iwoye II / Iwoye Street; Ido Road Near Maternity Centre; Idi Agbagba Near Idi Agbagbga; Idemo, Old Methodist Mission; Oke Ora I Aafin Oju Oja Methodist Pry School; Oke Ora II Open Space Near Asalu's House; Odo Ora I, Near Baba Egbe's House; Odo Ora II, Open Space I; Odo Ora II, Open Space II; Ilogun At Ilogun
Ido / Osi	Igbole / Ifisin / Aaye	Town Hall, Temidire / Ifaki Road; Market Stall, Ejimoko; Maternity Centre, Oke Ifisin / Ilamod; Inika Compound/Community Primary School; Town Hall, Idofin / Aafin; Oke Ode, Near Ogunleye's House; Near Chief Aluko's House, Ikefon; At Ilayan Quarters, Ilayan
Ido / Osi	Ayetoro I	Near Alhaji's Odo Iju's House / Ile Obanla; Near Chief Otun's House, Ile Eruku; S. D. A. Primary School, Ile Odogun; Oke Uro Town Hall, Ile Awu; St Charle's Primary School, Oke Uro; Near Chiefajani's House, Oponnu 1 And 11; Near Ogunsanmi's House, Isao I And II; Near Osuta's House, Ile Osuta
Ido / Osi	Ayetoro II	Near Ecelo Square, Aafin; Odosi Town Hall, Odosi; Near Orisa Oko, Oke Okin; St Joseph's Primary School, Ileaaye; Near Popoola's House, Ile Aoro Erutu; Near Aba Atiba's House, Ile Aba Atiba; Near Ogboya's House, Ile Ologboya; S. D. A. Primary School Sajuku I; Apostolic School, Sajuku II; Maternity Centre, Ile Odofin I And II
Ijero	Ijero Ward \A\'	Akanro - Christ Church School Compound; Porogun / Odooro - St. George's Pry. School; Maternity - Maternity; Odo - Osun - Infront Of Water Corporation; Elemikan - Elemikan's Compound; Orisagbemi / Chief Orisagbemi's Compound; Igbooloko / Odo - Ese - Nepa Office; Oyebola - Infront Of Oyebola's House; Ododara - Near Elemikan's Area
Ijero	Ijero Ward \B\'	Asasa - St. Mathew Primary School Compound; Asasa Near St Mathew Primary School Compound; Ojo Animasahun - Infront Of Akinbu Olobo; Elewere - Omi Funfun; Apaso - Near Folorunso Pool'S; Amos Obasa - C. A. C Church; Babade Ariyo's Compound, Omo Obokun; Odoye - Beside Olodoye's House; Eledahun - Infront Of Oloye's House
Ijero	Ijero Ward 'C'	Eminiwa Compound - St. Peters Pry. Sch. Compound; Olarewaju - Infront Of Olarewaju's Compound; Saloro - Infront Of Saloro's House; Otoki's House - C. A. C. Pry School; Olajide - Infront Of Olajide's House; Fatogbe - In Front Of Fatogbe's House; Ogodo's Compound - Ori Eguru
Ijero	Ijero Ward 'D'	Familoni - In Front Of Akanni's House; Alowolodu / Ojo - The Apostolic P. S. Compound; Arokodare - In Front Of Arokodare's House; Ijunrin Road - D. M. G. S. Compound; Stadium Road - Health Centre; Abule Titun - Abule Titun Saade; Saloro Farm - Community Pry. School Compound
Ijero	Ipoti Ward 'A'	Esaya / Olomojobi / In Front Of S. D. A. School Surulere; Arowojasin Ogbeluku Ile Aremo - Our Saviour P. S.; Ipoti High School - Ipoti High School; Odofin Owa / Aworokinmi - Odofin Near Adewa House; Isokun / Eyigbo - Surajudeen Primary School; Okeya / Aafin - C. A. C. Primary School; Aaye - Near Chief Aaye's House; Ogidi - The Apostolic Primary School
Ijero	Ipoti Ward 'B'	Osere - Baptist Primary School; Agiriojo Compound - Baptist Primary School; Sajiyan - Near Omodan's House; Ekunpa - Near Obapeto's House; Olope / Emila / Ajisun - In Front Of Emila's House; Olope II - In Front Of New Court Hall; Ologun / Elebeyin - Ologun Elebeyin Compound; Araromi / Omolewa - S. D. A. Primary School Omolewa; Eisikin Hamlet Obanla - Baptist Primary School Eisikin; Oyikaka / Oja Oko - St. Peters Primary School Oyikaka; Oko - Agba / Oyi Adefila - Agba Farm; Agbemo - In Front Of Pa Fele's House
Ijero	Odo Owa	Aafin - Town Hall Odo - Owa; Oke Ijana - St. Paul's Primary School A. Compound; Oke - Ose - Infront Of Agbele'S; Ile Ologun - St. Pauls Primary School B. Compound; Odofin Idogun - In Front Of Odofin Idogun's House; Surulere - Ofale Area; Oke - Ijana II - Town Hall; Odofin Idogun II - In Front Of Odofin Idogun's House; Oke - Ose II - Ejemu Agbele House; Oke Igi - Oke Igi Premises; Ofale - Community Primary School - Ofale; Alase Farm - Alase Farm; Oke - Igi - Oke Igi Farm
Ijero	Iloro Ward 'A'	Ile Oja Ogun - African Primary School; Idi Ogun - African Primary School Compound; Ile Aaye - In Front Of Aaye's House; Aworo - In Front Of Pelebe's House; Fajuyigbe / Okunrinopo - In Front Of Fajuyigbe House; Oke Bola - Iloro Community High School; Obalogbo - In Front Of Obalogbo's House; Ijemu / Sajiyan - In Front Of Chief Ejemu's House; Oko Ejemu -Ejemu Quarters; Eruku - Ijemu Town Hall; Olopaye - In Front Of Alaye's House
Ijero	Iloro / Ijunrin Ward 'B'	Eyelaye - In Front Of Town Hall; Ogundele's Compound - In Front Of Ogundele's House; Ile Aworopake Okin - In Front Of Lucas Dada's House; St. Mary's Primary School Area - St. Mary Primary School I; St. Mary's Primary School Area - St. Mary Primary School II; Aafin - Post Office; Oko Ererin - Ererin Premises; Best Way - United Primary School Compound; Sajiku I - In Front House; Aafin - Town Hall Ijunrin; Oko Ore - In Front Of Sunday Adebayo's House; Temidire - Catholic Primary School Compound I; Temidire - Catholic Primary School Compound II; Asao - In Front Of Asao's Compound; Sajuku - In Front Of Efi's House; Idi Igi Ose - Near Idi Igi Ose; Awor Efi - In Front Of Efi's House; Abebi - Abebi Premises
Ijero	Ikoro Ward 'A'	Okemogbo I And II Columba's R. C. M.; Temidire - St. Luke's Primary School; Atiba - Near Owena Bank; Iwaro I And II - St. Micheal Primary School; Igbo Eku - Igbo Eku; Ogbon Titun - A. U. D. Primary School; Iloro Area - The Apostolic Primary School; Aafin - Palace Area; Aba Petesi - Baptist Arapate; Ogboni - Ogboni Camp; Isare - Aba Joachim; Olude / Gbadamosi - Olode Camp; Soso Farm - Baptist Church; Sakoro / Ikosi - Bolorundo Community Primary School; Kajola Farm - Kajola; Omoleye - In Front Of Sule's House; Aafin - Near Palace Area; Soso Farm - Near Baptist Farm
Ijero	Ekamarun Ward 'A'	Oke Agba - Community Primary School Temidire; Oke Agba - Bus Stop Temidire; Idi Ayan / In Front Of Alayan's Hall; Odo - Ode / Iparao - In Front Of Fele's House; Oke Ode I - Catholic Primary School; Oke - Ode II - In Front Of Egome's House; Aafin - Iroko Town Hall; Iwaro - St. Pauls' Primary School; Oke - Iroko - In Front Of Chief Akoleola House; Oke Ode - In Front Of Madam Apanisile; Temidire - Inside Bus Stop; Aduralere - Community Primary School / Idao; Oke Agbede - Market Squre; Temidire Street - Temidire Premises; Ilukuno - Aafin
Ijero	Ekameta	Obatedo - Community Primary School A; Aafin - Community Primary School B; Iwaro - Temidire Area; Aafin - Palace Premises; Oke Araromi - St. Mary's Catholic Primary School Compound; Odo Ilaro - St. Pauls Anglican Primary School Compound; Oke Araromi - St. Mary's School; Erijiyan I - Near Maternity Centre; Erijiyan II - Near Maternity; Ile Odofin - Baptist Primary School Compound; Aafin - Baptist Primary School Compound Epe
Ikere	Atiba/Aafin	Near King's Palace - Aafin; Aro Atiba Hall - Sao Agbadamu; Elemo Odo Hall - Akamuja; L. A. Primary School - Owalemisoro; St Luke's Primary School - Akomolagbe; St Luke's Primary School - Ayalodi; Atiba Bus Stop - Ojumuro, Osoore / Eyejumo; Custom Building - Ajolagun
Ikere	Okeruku	Vertinary Hall - Oisa Alada; Ologunsaba Hall - Ologunsaba; Asao Hall - Asao; Oisa Agbegede Hall - Oisa Agbegede; Renu Orisajewi Hall - Renu Orisajewi I; Idi - Isin Junction Under The (Tree) Idi - Isin Renu Orisajewi II; Ofamofuru Hall - Ofamofuru; L. A. Primary School - L. A. School
Ikere	Ugele / Aroku	Ekuasa - Awadoierua Hall - Ekuasa Awadoierua; Amuakun Hall - Amuakun; Ekuasa Ogangan Hall - Ekuasa Alapansapa; Oloriawo Hall - Oloriawo / Arowolo; Osagburu Hall / Sao Onileke; Osagburu Hall / Oke Oloti; Ajaka Hall - Ajaka Hall
Ikere	Agbado / Oyo	Aba Oyo Hall - Aba Oyo; Alayinrin Hall - Alayinrin; In Front Of Tami's Hall - Tami Agbado; In Front Of Chief Edemo's House - Edemo's House; St. Pius Primary School - Gbolagun; College Of Education Bus Stop, College Of Education / Oke Ayeye; Isoda Hall - Odofin / Agbado; Eleyo High School Hall - Eleyo High School Hall
Ikere	Ogbonjana	Ekuasa Oloriawo Hall - Ekuasa; Asae Okorokoro Hall - Abegunde / Apostolic; Isaoye Hall / Salotun / Saya; Elejoka Hall - Odokoro / Onijoka; St. Thomas Primary Anglican School Eselomo -Salotun Asao; St. Joseph Primary School - Olowa; C. A. C Church, C. A. C Church
Ikere	Oke - Osun	Holy Trinity Primary School - Oisa Onise Ale; Garage - Ile Aro / Ereja; A. U. D. Primary School - Ajobo / A. U. D.; Unity Secondary School / Unity Secondary Area I; Unity Secondary School / Unity Secondary Area II; Community Primary School - Oniyo Welfare; Garage Bus Stop - Ugbooka Junction
Ikere	Idemo	Edemo Hall - Edemo Hall Area; Opa Rere Hall - Opa Rere Hall; Odepetu Hall - Ode Petu Hall; L. A. Primary School / Ademusire; Ebenezer A. / C. School - Elemoso; Saruku Ajiboye Hall - Ajiboye Hall Area; Alabisoye Hall - Ejemua Alabisoye
Ikere	Ilapetu / Ijao	Ibariba Hall - Ilapetu / Ibariba; Okitiko Hall - Okitiko; Osolo Hall - Ilapetu; Ejimo Hall - Ejimo; Olowu Hall - Olowu; Ajolehinogun Hall - Ajolehinogun; Baptist Primary School - Ijao Hall; St Peter's Primary School - Ijao; Oisa Olorunfemi - Oisa Olorunfemi
Ikere	Are Araromi	St. John's Primary School - Alukogege; St. Mary's Primary School - Alukogege; God's Grace Primary School - Adewunmi / Obatayo; A. U. D. Primary School - Olumuroko I; A. U. D. Primary School - Olumuroko II; God's Grace Primary School - Alakaloko I; St Jame's Primary School - Araromi; Community Primary School - Okondo / Aso Village
Ikere	Afao / Kajola	Market Place - Odofin Compound; Aro Hall - Aro Compound Primises; Afao Market - Ajagemo; St John's Primary School - Iloje Compound; L. A. Primary School - Oisa / Olusua; Annco School - Annco Area; Health Centre - Oke Oriro I; Health Centre - Oke Oriro II; Ado Garage - Ilupeju Sawmill
Ikere	Odose	Post Office Bus Stop - Saya /Post Office Ereja; Near Market Place Odose - Oisa Oyinkunrin; Near Church Of The Lord - Church Of The Lord Area; Methodist Primary School - Ilumoba; St Bridget Primary School - Alasa Odo; L. A. Primary School - Ologunleko / Alofin; Aro Hall - Igbo / Oru / Alaguntan; New F. S. P. Training Centre - New Market Area
Ikole	Ikole West I	In Front Of Alasin's Palace - Aofin; Holy Apostolic Primary School - Emuyin / Palm Grove; In Front Of Chief Oye's House - Idofin/ Aud; In Front Of Obaloke's House - Aofin / Ilado / Isolo / Igbona; Beside Bale's House - Aba Ajileye; Abuturu - Odo Oko / Papa / Adodo / Buturu; In Front Of Alonge's House - Igbede Ilado; Infront Of Olotunja's House - Aofin; In Front Of Adeyemi's House - Odo Ipa; In Front Of Badmus's House - Ilotin / Imuo; In Front Of Ajayi's House - Oke Odo / Ijisun
Ikole	Ikole West II	In Front Of Aina's House - Itao / Iloye I; In Front Of Omotobi's House - Ijemu / Aafin / Itao / Iloye II; In Front Of Aafin's Palace - Isalu / Ora; In Front Of D. S. Ajayi's House - Ilogbo I; Near D. S. Ajayi's House - Ilogbo II; Infront Of Ajiboye's House - Igbodo /Ago Igbira; Market Stall Isaba - Idofin; In Front Of Alamo's House - Ilamo; In Front Of Asaba's Palace - Aofin; In Front Of Ogunsakin's House - Ilale / Ilawe; In Front Of Adenigba's House - Ogbontitun / Oke Gba; In Front Of Oluwatuyi's House - Kajola; In Front Of Oguntuase's House - Aduralere
Ikole	Ikole East	A. U. D. Primary School - Idemo / Iwetin; Ikunri Premises - Ikunri / General Hospital/ Egbeoba; Oke Ijebu Bus Stop - Oke Ijebu / Atiba Ramatu; Beside Mr. Jegede's House - Iluga; In Front Of Onise's House - Ilise; In Front Of Igbalajobi's House - Imiro; In Front Of Sajowa's House - Itosa / Ilesi; In Front Of Ibisco House - Igboroko; In Front Of Obasalu's House - Taye / Oko Tanyin; In Front Of Chief Olomidi Gbasa's House - Igbasa / Ikasi/ Ilado; In Front Of Chief Osayindogan's House - Molete; Opposite Jehovah Withness Church - Igbo Odo
Ikole	Ikole North	In Front Of Anifowose's House - Idemo I; Beside St. Paul Ologede - Iloda; In Front Of Idemo's House - Idemo; In Front Of Olominu's House - Iwakun; In Front Of Olaiya's House - Iyinmi; In Front Of Chief Rawa's House - Ijomu; In Front Of Olomododo's House - Omododo I; Besides Oloka's House - Omododo II; In Front Of Nathaniel Abe's House - Omododo III; Beside Of Ade Okeya's House - Omododo IV; In Front Of Olotin's Palace - Ilotin I; In Front Of Famoroti's House - Ilotin II; In Front Of Elekole's Palace - Aofin; In Front Of Balogbo's House - Oke Ode I; In Front Of Dr. Filani's House - Oke Ode II; In Front Of Onikoyi's Palace - Odo Ode I; In Front Of Orisunbare Primary School - Iwetin; In Front Of Sani's House - Igbale / Odo Iro; In Front Of Bayo Fafure's House - Ile Gbure; In Front Of Onipede 's House - Abebi / Ilotin; In Front Of Bayemo's House - Odo Ode II; Community Primary School, Ikoyi - Ikoyi - Ile; St. Saviours Primary School - Odo Ara / Eku Oke Ara; In Front Of Irerun's House - Irerun; In Front Of Oloye's House - Oke Eka / Odo Ara
Ikole	Ikole South	In Front Of Living Stone House - Aparanyin; Beside Popular House - Iteta / Ijowa / Idunmorun I; Near Popular's House - Iteta / Ijowa / Idunmorun II; In Front Of Akasin's House - Ilara / Ilisa / Irede /Ajana; In Front Of Ola Ojo's House - Oke Ibukun; Opposite Ogunseyin's House - Ayemi / Idunmorun; Irepodun Primary School - Isere / Inisa / Bolorunduro; African Primary School - Ila / Oke Aleu; Beside Legion House - Oke Aremo I; In Front Of Olorunosebi's House - Aremo II; Beside People's Bank - Isunrin I; Near Jide's Photo - Isunrin II; Oisakole's House - Obadoro; Town Hall - Oke Orin; Near Olorin's Palace - Odo Orin; Open Space At Olorin's Camp - Orin Ile
Ikole	Araromi / Bolorunduro	In Front Of Chief Asaobi's House - Igbasa; Beside Ogungbemi's House - Ikasi; In Front Of Falade's House - Odo Aofin I; In Front Of Adeoye's House - Odo Aofin II; Community Primary School - Odo Aofin III; In Front Of Olomidimiro's House - Odo Ilise/Imiro; In Front Of Bamisaye's House - Isolo; Space Within Bolorunduro - Bolorunduro; Space Within Aba Audu - Aba Audu; Beside Agboola's House - Ilesi / Utaun; In Front Of Oluwole's House - Aketa / Igbore; In Front Of Ogunleye's House - Odo; Space Within Audu Camp - Audu / Baba Ode / Igbo Olukoju; Space Within Igboreo - Igboreo / Igbo Ore / Igbo Aketa; Space Within Itagbangba - Ibayan / Ilado / Itagbangba
Ikole	Ijesa Isu	St. Joseph Primary School - Iran; Beside Falade's House - Ipetekun; In Front Of Akanle's House - Ukoa I; Near Akanle's House - Ukoa II; In Front Of Fasade's House - Egunmi; Holy Trinity School - Iloko I; Near Holy Trinity School - Iloko II; In Front Of Olabiowu's House - Ibila; Open Space At Aba - Ego Iwerepe Ayo; Open Space At Aba - Aba Fatunla / Arigidi; Open Space At Aba - Mushin; Open Space At Areta - Aba Areta; In Front Of Atoba's House - Oke Osa; In Front Of Ogunlola's House - Igbede; In Front Of Onilokun's House - Ilokun / Ilase I; Near Onilokun's House - Ilokun / Ilase II; In Front Of Old Alameku's House - Ilojo / Ijemu; Open Space At Emiloju's Farm - Emiloju Farm Settlement; Beside Akin Ojubolamo's House - Oke Ope; Open Space At Oko Oba - Oko Oba; Open Space At Mushin - Ilado
Ikole	Odo Ayedun I	Town Hall - Oke Ona; In Front Of Adelusi's House - Odo Lase; In Front Of Ajiboye's House - Ere Ipebi; In Front Of Fasina's House - Iloro; In Front Isa's House - Igbo Orisa; In Front Of Ajagun's House - Odo; In Front Of Obajemu's / Ogunleye's House - Oke Lase; In Front Of Olokola's House - Okola; Beside Obalumope's House - Ilumope; In Front Of Obadofin's House - Idofin; In Front Of Chief Awe's House - Ilado; Open Space At Aba Igbira - Aba Igbira; Beside Cashew Tree - Orisunbare; Open Space At Gbodigbodi - Aba Gbodigbodi; Open Space At Odo Ona - Odo Ona; Open Space At Aba Olose - Aba Olose; Open Space At Aba Garuba - Aba Garuba; Open Space At Ilado - Ilado
Ikole	Odo Ayedun / Ayebode	Odundun High School - Ere I; Odundun High School - Ere II; Anglican Primary School - Imila; Catholic Primary School - Iloro; In Front Of Moses House's Ipebi / Imila; Community Primary School - Odo / Ugo; In Front Of Fanimo's House - Owana; Olomowi's House - Ileawu; Primary School Ayebode - Iremo; Primary School Ayebode - Odo Uro; Primary School Ayebode - Ido; In Front Of Chief Aro's House - Ido / Iranro
Ikole	Oke Ayedun	Methodist Primary School - Ogbe I; Methodist Primary School - Ogbe II; Methodist Primary School - Igboroko; Catholic Primary School - Iluga; In Front Of Adeniyi's House - Idemo; Catholic Primary School - Igboroko II; Town Hall, Oke Ayedun - Irutu I; In Front Of Otunba's House - Irutu II; Open Space At Oke Ayedun Market - Irutu III; Alaaye Estate - Irutu IV; Ang. Pry. School - Itafin; Catholic Pry. School - Igboroko; Ang. Pry. School - Ilisin; Town Hall, Esun - Isalu; Near Elesun Palace - Iloda; Open Space In The Site - Itamodowa/Ajigodo Camp; Open Space At Aba - Aba Igbira; In Front Of Chief Olomodesun's House - Isolo/Idofin
Ikole	Ipao / Oke Ako / Irele	Baptist Primary School - Ijowa; In Front Of Oba's Palace - Otun; Open Space In The Camp - Oba Adekunle Camp; Baptist Primary School - Odo Owo I; Baptist Primary School - Odo Irele; Okuta Gogoro - Oba Ogunbiyi's Palace; Akere Elepo - Asaoni's Camp; Oke Isegun - Ajibola's Camp; Baptist Primary School, Ipao - Ejiba; In Front Of Baba Saro's House - Aofin; Postal Agency - Oke Iminio; In Front Of Ogundele's House - Igbara I; In Front Of Obatin's House - Igbara II; Opposite Mosque - Aba Igbira; Near Market Place - Ikoko / Agbogun; In Front Of Aba Dudu - Aba Baba Dudu
Ikole	Itapaji / Iyemero	St. John Primary School - Iyemero I; St. John Primary School - Iyemero II; Community Primary School - Itapaji I; Community Primary School - Itapaji II; Igboroko Community School - Itapaji III
Ilejemeje	Ewu	Apejoye, St. Bonifaces School; Odo Ode I, In Front Of Anglican Church; Court Hall, Court Hall; Ori Egun, In Front Of James Dada's House; Oke Oniyo, In Front Of Jimoh Dada's House; Aafin, Aafin; Akuajo, Akuajo; Oke Omu, In Front Of Chief Esimo's House; Temidire In Front Of Sajuku's House; Odo Apejoye, In Front Of Chief Odofin's House; Ile Tuntun, In Front Of Chief Onigemo's House
Ilejemeje	Eda Oniyo	Odo Owa I, In Front Of Eleda's House I; Odo Owa I, In Front Of Eleda's House II; Oke Igbana, Infront Of Baba Egbe's House; Isalu / Igbana, In Front Of Agbana's House; Araromi, Infront Of Iyalaje's House; Ilemeso, In Front Of Onigemo's House; Ojulemoba, In Front Of Chief Oguntifa's House
Ilejemeje	Obada	Oke Oje, In Front Of Falodun's House; Alarin, In Front Of Adetifa's House; Ilejisun I And II, In Front Of Adetifa's House; Ojule Oloro I And II, In Front Of Osolo's House; Ojule Aafin, In Front Of Agbetoke's House; Ilije Street, In Front Of Owoeye's House; Isolo I And II, Infront Of Awolope's House; Iye Road II, Community Primary School
Ilejemeje	Iye I	Odoun, M 12 Ayeremi Street; Okeun, Town Hall; Ilafe, In Front Of Chief Faloro's House; Araromi, Open Space At Araromi; Ile Gemo, Open Space At Ilegemo; Odi Olowo I, Infront Of Balogun's House; Odi Olowo II, Infront Of Balogun's House; Ijio In Front Of Abiodun's House; Ilepe / Aooi, In Front Of Agbelesebieko's House; Ikoro I, In Front Of Ojoge's House; Ikoro II, Infront Of Ojoge's House
Ilejemeje	Iye II	Ilisemo I Iyemokun Primary School; Ilisemo II Iyemokun Primary School; Ile Ebu, Infroont Of Olaifa's House; Ojumorin Odo, F 28, Church Street; Ilora, A 2, Ilepa Street; Odo Idera, Infront Of Adeosoun's House; Ile Asalu / Okere, Ilefon Hall; Iletun, J 46, Church Street; Ile Poro, In Front Of Omola's House
Ilejemeje	Iye III	Iremo, Maternity Centre, Ijeshamodu Road; Imose, In Front Of Baba Lola's House; Owakuta, Isapa Hall; Aafin, In Front Of Oniye's House; Igbede, In Front Of Oyedele's House; Ise, In Front Of Akinwunmi's House; Imose / Ide, Infront Of Chief Akeredolu's House
Ilejemeje	Ijesamodu	Oke Ode I, Town Hall; Oke Ode II, Town Hall; Odo Ode St. Lukes Primary School; Araromi Quarters, St. Lukes Primary School; Aleja Quarters, In Front Of Chief Olukosi's House; Ogbon Aragan, In Front Of Agboola's House; Egena Quarters, In Front Of Onijoka's House; Isi Ogun Quarters, In Front Of Bamidele's House; Ori Egun, In Front Of Olasehinde's House
Ilejemeje	Iludun I	Odofin Area, In Front Of Adeosun's House; Epe, In Front Of Chief Ojo's House; Araromi, In Front Of J. K.'S; Ijaro, In Front Of Ogunleye's House; Olorunsogo, In Front Of Aluko's House; Oke Iludun I, St. David's School; Oke Iludun II, St. David's School; Iworoko, In Front Of Toba's House; Ilisemo, In Front Of Chief Obanla's House
Ilejemeje	Iludun II	Odofin Area, In Front Of Adeosun's House; Epe, In Front Of Chief Ojo's House; Araromi, In Front Of J. K.'S; Ijaro, In Front Of Ogunleye's House; Olorunsogo, In Front Of Aluko's House; Oke Iludun I, St. David's School; Oke Iludun II, St. David's School; Iworoko, In Front Of Toba's House; Ilisemo, In Front Of Chief Obanla's House
Ilejemeje	Ipere	Ilisemo I, In Front Of Olajubu's House; Ilisemo II, In Front Of Eisajofi's House; Igbede Odo I, In Front Of Ilesanmi's House; Igbede Oke II, St. Peters School; Isaba I, In Front Of Osasona's House; Isaba II, In Front Of Omoniyi's House; Ijemo I, In Front Of Onibode's House; Ijemo II, Town Hall; Temidire I, In Front Of Fagbemi's House; Temidire II, In Front Of Fagbemi's House
Irepodun / Ifelodun	Afao	St David's Primary School / Maternity Area; Front Of Maternity / Maternity Area; Egbira Farm Settlement / Egbira Farm Settlement; Adeosun Compound / H. Adeosun 's Compound I; Near Adeosun Compound / H. Adeosun 's Compound II; Front Of Oba's Palace - Araromi Obo
Irepodun / Ifelodun	Are	Front Idemorun Compound - Idemorun Compound I; Near Idemorun Compound - Idemorun Compound II; Community School - Olaofe Compound; Oke Aafin Compound - Oke Aafin; Ayegunle I - Ayegunle Area; Ayegunle II - Ayegunle Area; Odo Ode - Odo Ode Area; Court Hall - Apanisile Area; Ilawemo Compound - Ilawemo Area; Near Ilawemo House - Ilawemo Area
Irepodun / Ifelodun	Awo	A. U. D. Primary School - Awo I; A. U. D. Primary School - Awo II; Catholic Primary School - Awo III; Ejigan Compound - Awo IV; Market Stall - Awo V; Odo Oja - Odo Oja Area; Front Oluwaro Compound - Oluwaro Compound; Anglican Primary School - Awo VI; Fakeye Hall - Fakeye Area; Town Hall - Town Hall Area; Omosio Compound - Omosio's Area; Center Ajebamidele 's Farm Settlement - Ajebamidele Settlement
Irepodun / Ifelodun	Igbemo	Osodabi Compound - Osodabi Area I; Near Osodabi - Osodabi Area II; Odofin Compound - Odofin Area; Oyesanya Compound - Oyesanya Compound; Iwakun Compound Iwakun Area; Oloketuyi Compound - Oloketuyi Area; Iwalewa Compound - Iwalewa Area; Oloje Compound - Oloje Area; St Peter's Primary School - Ojigbemo Square; Front Aafin - Aafin Compound; Ojigbemo Square - Ojigbemo Square; Odola Compound - Odola Compound; St Willam's Primary School - Odo Aafin Area; Near Oluwadumiye House - Oluwadunmiye Area; A. U. D. Primary School - Post Office Area; Near Odo Odi - Odo Odi Area; Old Dispensary - Old Dispensary; Front Health Center - Health Center; Balogun Compound - Balogun Compound; At Orun - Oloja / Bishop Compound; Ajagbemokeferi House - Egbedi Compound
Irepodun / Ifelodun	Igede I	Adaramola Compound - Adaramola Compound; Round About - Unrin Round About; Anglican Primary School - Nepa Area; Asao Compound - Asao Area; Odofin House - Odofin House; Saade Compound - Saade Compound; Front Of Ujumu - Ujumu's Compound; C. A. C. Primary School - Idogun / Uto Area; Front Omodara - Omodara Compound; Solo Compound - Solo Compound; Front Oluri - Oluri 's Compound; Oisaya House - Oluri Compound II; Abe Compound - Abe Compound; Community School 'B' - Oisinkin Compound; Obanla Compound - Obanla Compound
Irepodun / Ifelodun	Igede II	Court Hall - Aafin Compound; Adara Compound - Adara Compound; Ile Abiye Maternity - Oke Odo; Olulogbo Compound I - Olulogbo Compound; Olulogbo Compound II - Olulogbo Compound; Edemorun Compound - Edemorun Compound; Community Hall - Community Hall Area; Community 'A' - Aro Compound; Aro House - Aro Compound; Igedora - Igedora Area; N' Lameco - Oloro Compound; Oloro Compound - Oloro Compound; Iremo Compound - Iremo Compound; Odoloro Compound - Odoloro Compound; Front Of Post Office - Post Office Area
Irepodun / Ifelodun	Igede III	Baptist Primary School - Elemokanse / Isolo / Asalu I; Baptist Primary School - Elemokanse / Isolo / Asalu II; Ajibade Compound - Ajibade Compound; Isolo Compound - Isolo Compound; Anisulaja Compound - Anisulaja Compound; Elemoba Compound - Oisemo / Awolokun / Elemoba; Ehinola Compound - Ehinola Compound; Dada Dapo Compound - Dada Dapo Area; Oloro Compound - Oloro; Erede Square - Erede Square; Ejigbo Compound - Ejigbo Compound
Irepodun / Ifelodun	Iropora / Esure / Eyio	Edemo Compound - Edemo Compound; Osotun Compound - Edemo Compound; Town Hall - Town Hall Area; Ooye Compound - Town Hall Area; Aafin Compound - Aafin Compound; Arowa Compound - Aafin Compound; Post Office - Post Office; Sule Ola Compound - Sule Ola Area; Esure Baptist Primary School - Esure I; Postal Agency - Esure II; Araromi Farm Settlement - Araromi Farm I; Araromi Farm Settlement - Araromi Farm II; St Paul's Primary School - Eyio I; Maternity - Eyio II; Near Maternity - Eyio III; Aafin Compound - Eyio IV
Irepodun / Ifelodun	Iworoko	Community High School - Igbira Farm Settlement; At Aba Igbira - Igbira Farm Settlement I; At Aba Igbira - Igbira Farm Settlement II; Oke Abo I - Oke Abo Area; Oke Abo II - Oke Abo Area; Ilayin - Ilayin Area; Idogun I - Idogun Area; Idogun II - Idogun Area; Idogun III - Idogun Area; Oke Ede - Oke Ede Area
Irepodun / Ifelodun	Iyin I	Petu's Compound - Petu Compound; Balogun Compound - Elera Area; Near Balogun Compound Elera Compound; Onikansomi Compound - Onikansomi Compound; Near Onikansomi Compound - Onikasomi Compound; Saro Compound - Saro Compound; Odole Compound - Odole Compound; Near Odole Compound - Odole Compound; Afeni Compound - Afeni Compound; Elijah Akintunde - E. Akintunde ' S Compound; All Saint's Primary School - Fasose Compound; St Micheal Primary School - Olubobokun Compound; Eledipo Compound - Eledepo Compound; Agbakin's Compound Agbakin's Compound; Ajengele Compound - Ajengele Compound; Oloyede Compound - Oloyede Compound; Odogun Compound - Odogun Compound; Asao Compound Asao Compound; C. A. C. Primary School - Oloro / Ojoko; Ayelabola Compound - Ayelabola Compound; Peter Ayelabola - Ejisun Compound; Oloro Compound - Oloro Compound; All Saint's Primary School - Elemo / Ola Oye Compound
Irepodun / Ifelodun	Iyin II	Bada Compound - Bada Compound; Olorunsola Compound - Olorunsola Compound; Eyelori Compound - Eyelori Compound; Bus Stop - Ekirna Compound; Ariyo Compound - Aduolanipekun / Ariyo; A. U. D. Primary School - Olofinlade / Anifowose; A. U. D. Primary School - Olofinlade / Ariyo; Alayanrin Compound - Alayanrin Compound; Oluyin Compound - Oluyin Compound; Asale Compound - Asale Compound; Baptist Primary School - Onileowo Compound; Court Hall - Arowa Compound; Near Court Hall - Arowa Compound; Obale Compound - Obale Compound; Okeagbe Farm - Okeagbe Farm Settlement I; Okeagbe Farm - Okeagbe Farm Settlement II; Community Primary School - Araaromi Farm; Atoro - Atoro Farm Settlement; Odo Anu Farm - Odo Anu Farm Settlement; Ijiko Farm Settlement - Ijiko Farm Settlement; Elemi Farm Settlement - Elemi Farm Settlement
Ise / Orun	Odo Ise I	Near Olaribia's House / Omiomo; Near Fayose's House / Idemo; Near Onisokoto's House / Araromi; Near Arogbodo's House / Odomoba I And II; Ofigba Community Primary School / Ofigba I And II; Near Ajagbure's House / Ofigba I And II; Open Space In Front Of Nitel / Akinluaduse; Near Open Space In Front Of Nitel / Aba / Gbira; Agbe Primary School / Olute / Salaja / Agbe Camp; Near Alabi's House / Ofigba I And II; Eyeloja's House / Ojude
Ise / Orun	Odo Ise II	Near Olori Ode Ajayi's House / Uleru; Near Owoeye's House / Owoeye Latif / Ologun Iyasuna; St. Mark's Primary School / Mission Road / Okesokan; Near Alhaji Ayolo's House / Odo Odi; Near Irasogun's House / Irasogun; Near Yeye Osi's House / Idi Agbagba Iro; Near Salaja's House / Ojude; Near Onisa's House/ Olisa; Owage's House / Oge; Adebusuyi's House / Iereke
Ise / Orun	Odo Ise III	Near Olugemo's House/Iro; Aud Primary School 1 / Sabo Primary School; Sabo A U D Primary School 11 / A. U. D. Primary School; Near Jide - Jide Hotel / Ese Street / Ajayei; Near Asae's House/Oke Diroko / Lower Asolo; Ajegunle Primary School / Ajegunle I And II I; Ajegunle Primary School / Ajegunle I And II II; St Philip's Primary School / Iwoye / Surulere / Oke Odi; C. A. C. Primary School / Itafa / Osinkun / Arigidi I And II; Near Baale's House / Ajegunle II; Near Makert Place / Ajegunle III; Emmanuel School / Igbira - Ese
Ise / Orun	Erinwa I	Open Space At Aafin / Aafin; Near Asimowu's House / Ijesa I; St Therasaa's Primary School / Ijesa II; Local Government Bus Stop / Upper Erinwa; St Stephens School / Central Erinwa; Local Government Library / Lower Erinwa; C And S Primary School / Araromi 1; Primary School At Afolu I And II / Osi / Afolu / Idi Osan; Near Mosque / Afolu II; Near / Olele, Near Lucas' House/Olele; Near Lucas House / Olele
Ise / Orun	Erinwa II	Open Space At Health Centre / Ogbese; St Andrews Primary School / Ogbese; Open Space At Market Stall / Ogbese; Primary School At Oko -Oba / Oko Oba; Open Space At Market Stall / Oko Oba; Community Primary School Onisu / Ejisun / Aba Ikeregun; Open Space At Orisunbare / Aba Ede Orisunbare; Ikare Camp / Oko- Oba; Ada Camp / Aba Ada/ Asalu
Ise / Orun	Oraye I	Near Ogunleye's House / Iro St./ Iloro; Near Fasae's House / Lagos; L. A. Primary School / Okesa; Near Adinlewa's House / Ayetoro; Near Falodun's House / Agori II / Irada; Near Oloke Toba's House / Idimotin I / Idimotin II; Community Primary School Akanle / Ikare / Odofin / Asaba / Akale Camp; Community Primary School Ajebamidele / Omuaran; Community Primary School, Ajebamidele /Ilogbo; Open Space At Ekan Camp / Ekan I And II; Near Jeremiah Balogun House / Olorunsogo Street
Ise / Orun	Oraye II	Open Space At Osogbo Camp / Osogbo Camp; Open Space At Ilofa Camp / Olofa Camp; Open Space At Osi / Ilofa Camp / Osi / Ilofa; Open Space At Ike Jumu Maberu / Oke Jumu II / Maberu; Open Space At Omokose / Imoriri / Anaye II / Omokose; St Paul's Primary School / Ogbon Titun I And II / Ipara Igbagbo / Oke Oniyo; Open Space At Ipara I Igbagbo / Omokose III / Opinmi II; Near Akinloge's House / Agori I And II; Near Babalade's House / Surulere Ige Rd.; Near Akinwande's House / Oke Oniyo II; Near Iya Ibeji's House / Oke Odo
Ise / Orun	Oraye III	Community Primary School / Odole / Odole; Market Stall / Temidire I; C. M. S. Church / Temidire II; Open Space At Alagbado / Adegbola / Alagbado; Kajola Primary School / Kajola I; Baptist Church / Kajola II; Kajola Maternity Centre / Kajola III; C. A. C. Church / Bolorunduro / Petulomo / Aba Isobo; Community Primary School / Temidire III; Open Space At Ita Ologbo's House Kajola IV; Open Space At Baale's House Ekemode
Ise / Orun	Orun I	In Front Of Ogunjemilua's House / Okondo Street; In Front Of Zacheus House / Iro Street; The Apostolic Primary School / Omolore; Community Grammar School / Idemo; In Front Of Ariyo's House / Alafia Street; In Front Of Adewunmi's House / Ogbon Titun; In Front Of Adetunji's House / Bolorunduro; Ebira Camp / Ebira / Itolofo; In Front Of Ojuawo's House / Iro II / Market Squre; In Front Of Agbede's House / Old Emure Road
Ise / Orun	Orun II	Ogundana's Camp / Opolokegun's Camp; Aafin (Open Space) / Aafin Olorun; Aafin Near Open Space / Aafin Olorun; In Front Of Jemiluas's House / Oba Abiodun Street; In Front Of Aro's House / Arigidi Street; In Front Of Olori Awo's House / Odo Ode Street; In Front Of Pastor Adu's House / Temidire Street; Open Space At Obadire Camp / Egan Aarin Camp; Open Space At Saibi's Camp / Omolaere Camp; In Front Of Ogunrin's House / Bolorunduro Street; In Front Of Omotayo's House / Araromi Street
Moba	Otun I	Imayan Town Hall / Ajebandele, Surulere; Imayan Town Hall / Ogbon Omi; At Obajewu / Obajewu; Moba Local Government Library / Oke Imope, Imoje, Ile Aarin; St Peters Primary School / Imoya, Ogbon Isawo; St Peters Primary School / Ile Alara / Odo Ore; St Lukes Primary School / Odo Imayan, Idofin, Igbo Iroko; Idiayan Market Stall / Ilotin; S. D. A. Primary School 'A' / Amututu I; S. D. A. Primary School 'A' / Amututu II
Moba	Otun II	A. U. D. Primary School / Government Technical College, Okeola, Ilegun; St Joseph Primary / Ilaro, Odo Ira; S. D. A. Primary School / Imoko; S. D. A. Primary School / Ilero; At Iso Isu Idiagbon / Iwesu, Ile Odo Street; In Front Of Obajemu's House / Igobo Ogun Ijemu; Ile Odo, Abeogede / Odo Alede; Ile Odo, Abeogede / Odo Inisa; Ile Odo, Abeogede / Inisa
Moba	Otun III	L. A. Primary School / Ile Iya Aba; L. A. Primary School / Oke Aafin; Maternity Centre / Aafin I And II; Ibukun Olu Nursery School / Imoro Area; In Front Of Oba Aro's Beer Palour / Odo Oja / Ile Balogun; In Front Of Post Office / Odo Oja I And II; At Bus Stop ( Odo Oja) / Ile Olu Agbebi
Moba	Igogo I	In Front Of Asaba's House / Oke Isaba, Ajinrinboto; At Ile Edemorun's House / Ile Edemorun; At Bus Stop / Idi Ose/ Idi Ose I; At Bus Stop / Idi Ose/ Idi Ose II; In Front Of Obaloro's House / Oke Iloro And Ile Ojua; In Front Of Obaloro's House / Ojule Morulu; In Front Of Ale's House / Ile Aarin Odo Egbe; In Front Of Ojoko's House / Ile Nla; In Front Of Ojoko's House / Ile Ojoko
Moba	Igogo II	Town Hall Igogo / Idi Adodo, Idoka; Comm. High Sch. / Igogo High Sch. Araromi; Behind Agboola's House / Ile Olomoyoyo & Ojule Meta; Inf. Of Obaaro's House / Ayedun, Oke Ola & Oke Iladun; Inf. Of Ogidi's House / Ile Odo I & II; Inf. Of Ogidi's House / Ile Odo III; S. D. A Pry Sch. / Ile Obaaro & Idemo; S. D. A Pry / Ile Aderobake; Court Hall / Ile Onimo & Ile Obaaro; St. Patricks Pry Sch./ Ile Eyemoja & Ile Atipo; St. Patricks Pry Sch. / Ile Aarini; Inf. Of Chief Emila's House / Ile Agbelusi; Inf. Of Aafin / Okeowa Aafin; Comm. Pry Sch. Isaoye / Ile Aarin; Comm Pry Sch. Isaoye / Ile Okemila; L. A Pry Sch. Ikosu / Ile Oke; L. A Pry Sch. / Ileojule Monikun I; L. A Pry Sch. / Ileojule Monikun II
Moba	Erinmope I	Co - Operative Hall / Ile Aniyun & Ile Agbedu; Beside Adeyeye's House / Ile Obanla; C. A. C Pry Sch. / Emila & Iwaro; St John's Pry Sch. / Ile Eje Odoola & Oke Imoye; Inf. Of Arira's House / Ile Arira; At Ile-Eki / Ile Eki; At Asaoye's House / Ile Asaoye; L. A Pry Sch. / Imesi & Odo Arojo; At Atiba Ijewu / Ile Mooba, Odo - Ogede And Ile Alakagba; L. A Pry Sch. / Odo Osun I & II; L. A. Primary School / Ijokun
Moba	Erinmope II	At Ile Abioro / Imesi Oke; At Ile Abioro / Ile Abioro; St John's Pry Sch. / Ipo; St John's Pry Sch. / Ile Oke; L. A Pry Sch. / Ile Aarin & Okeomu; C. A. C Pry Sch. / Odo Ikole & Ile Agbarigba; At Ipara Oniseke / Oke Okin, Odoiworo Aro & Ipara Oniseke; St John's Pry Sch. Aaye / Ilegosi; St John's Pry Sch. Aaye / Ilemo; St John's Pry Sch. Aaye / Isolo
Moba	Ikun I	Town Hall / Ile Onikun & Ile Owa; Inf. Of Obaleye's House / Oke Ilotin & Odo Ilotin; S. D. A Pry Sch. / Odo Isawo & Ehin Agbara; Town Hall / Ile Akogilede; Adegbayi's House / Igbo Epa & Idi Afa; A. U. D / C. A United / Araromi; A. U. D / C. A United / New Market Area
Moba	Ikun II	Near Obalego's House / Oke Ilogbo; Near Obalego's House / Idemo; All Saint's Pry Sch. / Owode, Temidire & Inurin; Inf. Of Omotara's House / Ile Odofin; Inf. Of Omotara's House / Ile Ajanaku; Inf. Of Omotara's House / Omotara; Inf. Of Late Oba Edisun House / Aromokeye & Oba Edisun; At Obanla's House / Irinka & Dam Sight
Moba	Osun	Ile Agbalu & Ojo Frontage House / Ile Owa, Ile Alani, Ile Agbalu Ojo & Ile Orinka; Town Hall / Ile Orisa Oko & Agbebu; Odo Agbara Frontage / Odo Agbara; Town Hall / Ile Odofin, Ile Eisa & Igbo Oro; St Augustine Pry Sch. / Ile Odofin, Ile-Ilero & Ebi Owa Oloro; Inf. Of Owoeye' S House / Ebi Owa Anifanu; Inf. Of Owoeye's House / Ile Olode; L. A Pry Sch. Epe / Ile Epe, Ile Aro & Ile-Oloro; L. A Pry Sch. Epe / Ile Ayo; At Ijemu / Ijemu; Comm. Pry Sch. Iro / Aroniro's Palace; Comm. Pry Sch. Iro / Oke Ila; At Aafin Ira / Ile Ogun; New C. M. S Church Ira / Ira C. M. S
Moba	Osan	Near Ile Obaoye / Ile Obaoye; Near Ile Obaoye / Oke Omu; A. U. D Pry Sch. / Apata & Ayomoleya; St. Peter's Pry Sch. / Isalu & Iloti; At Mogun Iwoye / Agbru St Iwoye Odo; St. Andrew's Sch. / Odo Owa; St. Andrew's Sch. / Idoromi; St. Peter's Pry Sch. / Ile Osun & Ijigbe; A. U. D Pry Sch. / Oke Imole
Oye	Itapa / Osin	Imogun, At Court Hall; Ita Ode Omo, At Ode Omo; Oke Oniyo, Comm. Pry Sch.; Isade I, Open Space At Isade; Isade II, Open Space At Ilado; Ode Omo II, Open Space At Iloka; Okeliju, Okeliju / Ijisun; Ijisun, Okeliju / Ijisun; Methodist Pry Sch., Afin /Isalu; At Isao, Isao; Open Space At Idofin, Umawun; At Idofin, Idofin; At Oroke, Oroke / Owa; At Egbetun, Egbetun / Imila; At Egbe, Egbe / Idogunja; At Iloro, Iloro / Ilokola; Open Space At Egena, Egena; Open Space At Ilaro, Ilaro; Open Space At Ilawe, Ilawe
Oye	Oye I	At St . Peters, Oke Padi; Immam's Comp'D, Irare; Afin Irare, Idara; Imogun Ilemio, Ilemio; Imogun Oke Eyin, Okeyin I; Ilewu Comp'D, Imogun Okeyin II; Ilewu Comp'D II, Okeyin III; Imogun Eyin, Okeyin IV; Imogun Eyin, Okeyin V; At Chief Falodun's Hs. Irare II; At Imogun Oketara, Oke Tara; At Eye Bokoaye' S Hs., Adegbemile; United Pry Sch., Omodowa; At Isebi, Isebi; Imogun Iworo, Iworo; Imogun Ijio, Ijio; Awogbemi's House, Ileseu I; Imogun Idofin, Ileseu II; At Uga Camp, Uga Farm Settlement
Oye	Oye II	At Ilodo, Ilodo; Dakona / Igboroko / Iloro / St. Mary's Primary School; At Ilogbo, Ilogbo; At Ilaro, Ilaro; At Ilemio, Ilemio; At Ejigbio Bus Stop, Ejigbio; At Ilegbio, Ilegbio; At Aye, Ilese I; At Aye, Ilese II; At Ilokun, Ilokun; At Ekunrun - Ekunrun; At Ijelumoyin - Ijelumoyin; At Ijagbemo - Ijagbemo; At Ilegbio - Ilegbio II; At College Comp, (Govt College, Unity); At Ileju - Ilese III; At Ileju - Ilese IV
Oye	Ayegbaju	At Atiba - Aafin; Court Hall - Offa; Under Odan Tree - Ifedore; At Esin - Esin; Emmanuel School - Isolo; At New Ikoko - Ibaekan / Iloko; At Catholic Church - Iloro; At Ilomo - Ilomo; Under Mango Tree - Oke Egbe; At Uje - Uje; At Ikoro, Ikoro; At Ilawe - Ilawe; At Ijagun - Ijagun; At Odo Ayo - Ago Igbira / Iworu; At Ipele - Ipele
Oye	Ilupeju I	At Odo Egosi - Odo Egosi I; At Odo Egosi - Odo Egosi II; At Okeji Okeji I; At Okeji Okeji II; At Aye -Aye; At Methodist Primary School - Isiwo; At Odo Egan - Odo Egan; In Front Of Babalola's House - Oke Uyan / Odo Uyan; At Ilidan - Ilidan; At Oke Ode - Ilesa / Oke Ode; At Iloro -Iloro; Dispensary - Apata Aje; Under Odan - Igesan; Anglican School - Iremo; In Front Of Ibigbami's House - Bele; Owode - Owode; At Araromi - Araromi; At Iketun - Iketun I And II; At Uro - Uro; At Odougba - Odougba
Oye	Ilupeju II	Catholic Primary School - Ilomo; At Isasa - Isasa; At Ilugbo - Ilugbo; At L. A. Primary School - Ilofi; At Ila - Ila I; At Ila - Ila II; At Aita - Aita; At Oba Olaleye's House - Ilese; At Balogun's House - Iworo; At Chief Olorunjola's House - Ila II
Oye	Ire I	In Front Of Ajayi's House - Aafin; At Ilegbemo - Ayedun / Igbemo; At Imesi-Imesi / Illo; At Imogun - Imogun; At Ilibisin - Ilibisin I; At Ilibisin - Ilibisin II; At Ebi Olorun - Ebi Olorun; At Temidire - Temidire; At Iloro - Iloro / Ilia / Ilibisin; In Front Of Omojemije's House - Isaba; At Onise's House - Araromi; In Front Of Ayeni's House - Uroo; At Ebi Ejigun - Ebi / Ejigun / Odofin; A. U. D. Primary School - Ijoka Oke Ode; Aba Igbira - Aba Igbira
Oye	Ire II	At Ilegemo - Ilegemo I; At Ifesowapo - Co-Op - Inidara; St John Primary School - Ilefa 1; Open Space At Ilawe - Ebi Ilawe I; At Ilawe - Ebi Ilawe II; Open Space At Igbemo - Igbemo; In Front Of Omotosho's House - Ilefa II; In Front Of Adeleye's House - Ilegbemo II; Beside Adeleye's House - Ilegbemo III; At Community Primary School - Ilefa III; Abule Ade Ojo - Abule Ade Ojo I; Abule Ade Ojo - Abule Ade Ojo II; In Front Of Akinyele's House - Ijisun; In Front Of Adelabu's House - Ilado; In Front Of Famuwole's House - Surulere I; In Front Of Fagbemigun's House - Ilabo; At Iju - Iju; In Front Of Salotun's House - Abule Ade Ojo III; In Front Of Operaru's House - Surulere II
Oye	Ayede North	Chief Daramola's Compound - Okutapete / Ada; Osikalu Hall - Ileotun / Ile Ose; L. A. Primary School - Agbeta / Ikoyi; Atta Hall - Aafin / Oju Oja; At Omotegun - Omotegun / Farm Settlement; At Oke Adura - Oke Adura / Oke Abe; At Ilaro - Egbeoba / Ilaro; Maternity Centre - Oladimeji; C. P. M. S. Store - Owaye; In Front Of Coop Store - Toyola; Community Primary School - Gede Farm Settlement; At Ejigbo - Ejigbo Farm I; At Ejigbo - Ejigbo Farm II; At Oke Alafia - Oke Alafia; At Tateu - Tateu Farm Settlement
Oye	Ayede South Itaji	Children Centre - Ilaro / Odo Iye; Opposite Nigeria Police Station - Odo Ayede; At Oke Dofin - Idofin; St Luke's Primary School - Imosi I; St Luke's Primary School - Imosi II; In Front Of Aro's House - Ikua I; In Front Of Aro's House - Inuodi I; At Inuodi - Inuodi II; In Front Of Edemorun's House - Oloje I; In Front Of Edemorun's House - Oloje II; In Front Of Aro's House - Oloje III; Imojo Primary School - Imojo I; Open Space At Imose III; Open Space At Ikua - Ikua II; In Front Of John Falojun's House - Inuodi III; Open Space At Ilesi - Oloje IV; At Elekiji Farm Settlement - Imojo II
Oye	Isan / Ilafon / Ilemeso	Comprehensive Primary School - Ilafon I; Open Space At Ilafon - Ilafon II; St James Primary School - Ilale / Ironi I; St James Primary School - Ilale / Ironi II; In Front Of Ayo Ola's House - Ilale / Iroyi; At Agriculture D. Ilusajumu's - Ilusajumu; In Front Of Baba Femi's House - Ibudo / Iwoye; St Pauls Primary School - Igbomoji / Adisa; In Front Of Apata's House - Ogilolo; In Front Of Jacob Bejide's House - Oke Isan; In Front Of Olode's House - Alewa; At Isan Secondary School - Isan Secondary School
Oye	Omu Oke / Omu Odo / Ijelu	Ijelu Primary School - Ileyin; Ijelu Primary School - Oke - Aye I; At Otun Ijelu - Otun Ijelu I; At Ojude - Iro; At Idi Erinrin - Oke Aye II; At Ita Ekun - Ita Otun Ijelu II; At Inisa Ijisun - Inisa / Ijisun; St Theresa's Primary School - Imila / Ayingbo; St Andrew's Primary School - Ifon / Ijisun / Inisa I; At Balogun - Agbe / Ele / Balogun; At Ifon - Ifon; Maternity Omu Odo - Ifon / Ijisun / Inisa II
