= Ogotun-Ekiti =

Town in Ekiti State, Nigeria

- Town
- Country: Nigeria
- State: Ekiti State
- LGA: Ekiti South-West
- Founded: c. 15th century (by Òjorùbè)

Government
  - Ologotun: Oba Adebayo Michael Adesanmi

Area
  - Total: 100 km^{2} (40 sq mi)
- Time zone: UTC+1 (West Africa Time)

Ogotun-Ekiti is a historic town located in the Ekiti South-West Local Government Area of Ekiti State, Nigeria. The town is known for its agriculture and the traditional craft of mat weaving.[1] It is ruled by a traditional monarch titled the Ologotun of Ogotun-Ekiti.[2]

== Geography ==
Ogotun-Ekiti is situated in the forest-savannah transition zone of southwestern Nigeria. Occupying an area of 40 square miles (103.6 square km), it is the largest town in the Ekiti South-West Local Government Area by landmass. It shares borders with Igbara-Odo[3] in Ekiti State, as well as Ikeji-Ile, Ikeji-Arakeji, and Igbara-Oke in neighboring Osun and Ondo states. The terrain consists of lowland tropical areas with arable soil that supports crops such as cocoa, maize, plantain, banana, kola nut, and palm oil.

The town lies between the Oruju and Agbe hills. It is bounded by Ikeji-Ile (Osun State) to the south, Igbara-Odo to the north, Ikeji-Arakeji to the east, and Ipole-Iloro (Ekiti West Local Government Area) to the west. The territory includes over twenty agricultural settlements located across its fertile lands.

== History ==
According to local oral tradition, Ogotun-Ekiti was founded by a warlord named Òjorùbè, who migrated from Ile-Ife. The name Ogotun is derived from "Ogun Otun" (meaning right-side war), and the title Ologotun translates to "Olori Ogun Otun" (leader of the right-hand army).

Oral history credits Òjorùbè's wife with introducing the craft of weaving mats from the leaves of Thaumatococcus daniellii (locally called ewé iran).[4]

== Traditional rulership ==
The traditional ruler of the town holds the title "Ologotun of Ogotun-Ekiti." Rulership rotates among designated ruling houses. The current monarch, Oba Adebayo Michael Adesanmi, ascended the throne in 2022 as the 32nd Ologotun.[5]

=== Chronology of Ologotun Rulers ===
- 1st to 21st Ologotuns: Sourced from the Olelebioke ruling house (individual names are partially documented).
- 22nd to 28th Ologotuns: Drawn from the Okinbaloye, Aruka, Arakale, Ogbenuote, Ojopekun Arosoye, Arojojoye, and Oboyele Kanabare ruling houses (15th century to 1924).
- 29th Ologotun: Oba Ademeso Atewogboye – Adeyi Ruling House (1925–1951)
- 30th Ologotun: Oba Samuel Olatunbosun – Arakale Ruling House (1952–1976)
- Regency: Princess Aina Eunice Ebe (1976–1985)
- 31st Ologotun: Oba Samuel Oladapo Oyebade – Ogbenuote Ruling House (1985–2021)
- Regency: Princess Mofebisola Omopeloye (2021–2022)
- 32nd Ologotun: Oba Adebayo Michael Adesanmi – Atewogboye Ruling House (2022–present)[6]

== Economy ==
The economy of Ogotun-Ekiti relies primarily on agriculture. Local farmers cultivate yam, cassava, maize, vegetables, cocoa, and oil palm products. The traditional mat-weaving industry remains active, with contemporary artisans adapting the craft to produce modern items such as purses, bags, and shoes.[1]

== Culture and festivals ==
Cultural practices in Ogotun-Ekiti are observed through several annual community festivals.

During the late 20th century, certain traditional observances were suspended under the reign of Oba Samuel Oladapo Oyebade, who discontinued the Ogun festival in 1991 and the Ifa festival in 1993.[7] The current monarch, Oba Adebayo Michael Adesanmi, has advocated for the revival of these historical festivals to preserve local heritage and support cultural tourism.

Major festivals in the town include:

- Ogotun Day Festival: Established by Oba Oyebade to encourage community development and civic unity.
- Obanifon Festival: Celebrated three times a year (in December, June, and February) to mark ancestral lineages and social relations.
- Osun Festival: Celebrated in honor of the river deity Osun.
- Owena Festival: A festival dedicated to the River Owena that was recently reinstated.
- Ogun and Ifa Festivals: Traditional spiritual celebrations from the early 1990s currently under consideration for community revival.[7]

== Religion ==
Christianity and Islam are practiced within the community, which contains multiple churches and mosques. Adherents of traditional Yoruba religion also maintain native rites and festivals.

== Notable people ==
- Hon. Abiola Olowookere: Asiwaju of Ogotun-Ekiti and Special Adviser to the Ekiti State Governor on Legislative Matters.[8]
