= Itapa Ekiti =

- Location in Nigeria
- Coordinates: 7°48′47″N 5°23′4″E
- Country: Nigeria
- State: Ekiti State
- LGA: Oye Ekiti
- Elevation: 614 m (2,014 ft)

Population (2012)
  - Total: 42,509
- Time zone: GMT+1
- Postal code: 370001
- Website: https://itapaekiti.wordpress.com/

Itapa Ekiti is a town in Ekiti State, Nigeria, of which the Owatapa is the ruler. Itapa is one of the goddesses worshipped at Ife. Her festival, known as Utaale, is held for a period of thirty days and she has been worshipped by Ooni and his people till today.

== Foundation legend and history ==
Amowa and Elepe, sons of Oduduwa, left Ile-ife (Ife) with their mother and two friends known as Elemo and Baaro. These people were hunters. At some stage Elepe took his leave and settled at one of Itapa's farms called Osin. Another brother of Amowa settled in a farm in Itapa called Ijelu, and he later became Elejelu. Amowa was the first Olosin of Osin. There are other gods called Elutapa and Orisa Itapa worshipped by Ooni and still worshipped today.

Owa attends these gods through his elected priests called Ayaya as the priest of Elutapa and Aworo Orisa Ilawe as the priest of Orisa Itapa or Ilawe. Elemo took his quarter and became the head of Remo while Baaro became head of Egetun. All of them were great hunters.

Many people came to settle with them and they became prosperous. These heads of quarters regarded Owatapa as their head and the people approached Owatapa through their heads, and Owatapa has the final say over all matters brought before him.

== Royal Sunrise and Sunset :: List of the Owatapa ==
Here are the names of the Owatapa in chronological order:

1. Owa Amowa
2. Owa Muaro, Amowa's son
3. Owa Jejeke
4. Owa Ponrokun: he removed his palace from Iloro Remo to where it is today. Chief Oisemo was asked to take charge of the palace.
5. Owa Yioye
6. Owa Abaradudu
7. Owa Awadieruasola
8. Owa Arawamokunrin. During the reign of this Owa, his town Itapa was overcrowded and many people went to settle at Egosi and at a place called Ila.
9. Owa Agiriyoyo
10. Owa Akitipa-Obibo
11. Owa Ijimgbere Oke
12. Owa Edun Alaye
13. Owa Iboun
14. Owa Ajakobijagba
15. Owa Okekorokoro ni kin ma gun on
16. Owa Agodisoro
17. Owa Okogirigiri ni ki nwon ma di on
18. Owa Ogogu. This Owa wanted to recall his people from Egosi but the people at Egosi, now called Ilupeju, refused to release them and this later resulted in a war, known as Ogun yinmomo ("give me child"). The people of Egosi were assisted by the Ikole. When the Itapas went to war, the Ikole came to Itapa and carried away their children and sold them. They were driven away. During this war, in another war from Ilorin led by Aliyu people were carried off from Itapa, Ikole and Egosi, including Prince Arowogbadamu who was only 7 years old at that time;
19. Owa Amerijoye made an alliance with Ata who also came from Iye in case of any other attack or war. They both settled together at Aiyede. When the Ibadan war broke out, Prince Arowogbadamu was captured and sojourned in Lagos from where he was brought to become the 20th Oba.
20. Owa Arowogbadamu emerged in 1876. Kiriji war was fought between 1879 and 1886. He died in 1891. After his death, his son, Pri
21. Owa Ola I (1891-1921) - The first meeting of the Ekiti Obas Pelu-Pelu was held in 1900, Methodist Church was introduced between 1901 and 1902, In 1941, Ikole district was created. In 1915, Ekiti and Ondo divisions were merged under Ondo Province; Grade C Native Court was established for Itapa, Ijelu, Omu and Osin, also Cocoa was first grown in the district in this same year. By 1917, the African Church was introduced to Itapa Ekiti.
22. Owa Ademiloye I (1921-1929) - During the reign of Oba Ademiloye I, the town experienced significant development as well as other notable events. Some of these events include: Successful conduct of the 1921 National Census, building of the first Methodist Church house at Isalu in 1922, introduction of Islam to Itapa Ekiti by Pa Ojakanrinkan in 1922, Methodist Church Primary School was granted in 1923, Construction of the motor road from Ifaki to Ikole was completed in 1924 and the introduction of Catholic Church in 1924;
23. Owa Alli, Atobatele I (1929-1942), the son of Arowogbadamu, was installed as the new Owatapa in 1929. During his reign, Methodist School was opened in 1929, in 1934, Itapa-Ijelu road was constructed.
24. Owa Ojo, Ola II (1943-1973).
25. Owa Amuda Adeyeye Alli, Atobatele II, (1987-2009); He reigned for 22 years, from 17 April 1987 to 29 December 2009.
26. Owa Makanjoula Ajaja Ph.D., Ilufemiloye Ola III, (2011–present), emerged as the new Owatapa on 25 November 2011 and was presented with the staff of office as the Owatapa of Itapa Ekiti on 31 March 2012 by the then Governor of Ekiti State, Dr. Kayode Fayemi. Ade a pe lori o. Kabiyesi

== Sources and external links ==
- Website about Itapa Ekiti and reigning monarch
- Glorious Itapa Ekiti on Facebook
- Royal Family of Ademiloye, Itapa Ekiti, Nigeria on Facebook
