= List of villages in Osun State =

Villages in Osun State, Nigeria

This is the list of villages and settlements inside Osun State, Nigeria organized by local government area (LGA) and district/area (with postal codes also given).

== By postal code ==
LGA	District / Area	Postal code	Villages
Aiyedaade	Gbongan	221101	Gbongan; Ogbagba; Wakajaiye
Aiyedaade	Ode-Omu	221102	Abinu Alakinde; Adam; Afonle; Alagbede; Alakan; Anjorin; Gbaja; Idi-Iroko; Moso Alagba; Ode Omu; Oloba; Oniwe Aporo; Oogi; Oosa Aro
Aiyedaade	Orile Owu	221103	Aba Dorcas; Aba Ibadan; Aba Oba; Abewela; Abimbola; Ademuyiwa; Adetunji; Afeleke-Dabongbo; Agbeja; Ajegunle; Ajule; Akinjobi; Alaguntan Village; Anlugbua; Araromi Owu; Atoba Village; Awaye; Baba Jakan; Bolarinwa-ladinni; Ejemu; Elegbeje; Fetubori; Fowosere Village; Gbeke; Gbonna; Idi Roke; Kegunnode; More Owode; Motakola; Obalufon; Ojetunde Village; Olosi Village; Opakunle; Osunwale; Sangodiran; Sesa Alila; Supori-Village; Timi Village; Toka
Aiyedire	Ile Ogbo	232103	Aderibigbe; Balogun; Ileogbo; Lemomu; Olukohun
Aiyedire	Kuta	232104	Aba Akan; Aba Olodo; Agbanda; Arugbede; Edoro; Eleja; Gboyi; Igboawu; Konko; Kuta; Odoogun; Ojegeba; Oke Osun; Otaawodi; Seke; Songba
Aiyedire	Oke Osun (Alabata)	232106	Aba Alaya; Aba Baale; Aba Igbira; Abani Kanda; Abi-Ilu; Abimbola; Adogba; Agba; Agbodowu; Ajadi; Ajegbendele; Ajigbagun; Akiru; Alabata; Alagbade; Alakeji; Alalubosa; Alamo; Alatise; Alawo; Aragba; Arindu; Aro Tarapin; Asipa Elefon; Baase; Babalawo; Bole; Dalemo; Ekerin; Eleegun; Eleji Oweeru; Elesin; Fagbolu; Gbojona; Idi-Iroko; Igberinwo; Ile Eran; Jagun labu Akinbami; Molamoyin; Okeelu; Olodo; Olota; Olowu; Olubooku; Onigangan; Onilete; Oosa Awoyale; Osolo; Osunwoyin; Owotoroka; Segbodile; Telemu
Aiyedire	Olupona	232015	Aba Jagun; Ajagbangba; Akuru; Alagbaa; Alawo; Alawusa; Alaya; Eleegun; Idi Ogun; Lagesin; Lanye; Molosu; Monfu; Moye; Odunfa; Ologiri; Olokun; Oloosa; Oloro; Olosokun; Olota Baale; Olubu; Olukotun; Olupona; Onigbongbo
Atakunmosa East	Ajebamidele	233112	Ajebamidele; Araromi; Arewa; Atorin; Ayinrin; Bello Alaka; Fadahunsi-Ogundele; Faforiji; Lapaede; Number; Onigbogi; Otokobo; Sokoto
Atakunmosa East	Eti-Oni	233113	Aiyetoro; Alarere; Eti-Oni; Faro; Itaapa; Odogbo; Olowu
Atakunmosa East	Iperindo	233111	Ajebamidele; Bolorunduro; Iperindo; Ipole; Ise; Odo
Atakunmosa East	Iwara	233110	Iwara Township, Igangan; Iwikun; Iyinta; Ita-Iwara; Asuku; Oko Aogo; Imobi-Iwara; Odo-Iwara, Mokore; Igbingbon-Iwara; Igigun; Ilosi; Oke-Agbede; Ekin-Iwara; Ologede; Aiyegbaju; Irode; Olopon; Owode; Ajido; Orogoji; Ilota; Oke Agbede; Ifoji; Ajeoku; Temidire; Erinburo; Odogbo
Atakunmosa West	Epe/Ifelodun	233106	Epe; Igbadae; Igun; Ijana; Iyenmogun
Atakunmosa West	Ibodi	233105	Aba Anu; Ibodi; Igila; Olorombo
Atakunmosa West	Ifewara	233109	Bowale; Ifewara; Imelu; Ogogo Akaro; Owena
Atakunmosa West	Isaobi	233103	Isaobi; Isotun; Itaosin; Salau
Atakunmosa West	Itagunmodi	233107	Alaba; Araromi; Itagunmodi
Atakunmosa West	Muroko	233104	Aladura; Ilaa; Isireyun; Isolo; Muroko
Atakunmosa West	Okebode	233108	Abebeyun; Kajola; Lala; Oke-Osin; Okebode
Atakunmosa West	Osu	233102	Akola; Alakowe; Alusekere; Aro-Aji; Ayorunbo; Balogun; Bara; Iloba; Itamerin; Iwaro; Odesomi; Orogo; Osu
Boluwaduro	Eripa	231116	Alafara; Eripa; Igbodu; Oke Oba
Boluwaduro	Igbajo	231118	Gbeleru; Igbajo; Iloro; Obaala; Obanla; Okerun
Boluwaduro	Iresi	231117	Agofulani; Gbonko; Iresi; Morakinyo; Obuke; Oke Opa; Osolo
Boripe	Aagba/ Ororuwo	231113	Aagba; Amola; Aru; Aweda; Elere; Fadele; Obada; Ororuwa; Otake
Boripe	Ada	231114	Ada; Alomi; Aweda; Erinwo; Loba; Okeigbo
Boripe	Iragbiji	231112	Aromadu; Banji Elegun; Egbeda; Elemo; Esa; Goregun; Idi Osan; Inurin; Iragbiji; Morifin; Odebudo; Olukosin; Oyo
Boripe	Iree	231115	Egbejoda; Iloko; Imuleke; Iree
Ede North	Ede	232101	Abogunde; Adejuwon; Araromi; Atapara; Atoyebi; Bara; Doba; Ede Township; Egbejoda; Elero; Faosun; Kajola; Lasiyi; Oloba; Tomoni
Ede South	Alajue	232103	Agbeinpa; Alajue; Aminiwon; Arola; Ededimeji; Idi-Oro; Idiagbon; Obanase; Ogbaagbaa; Olodan; Owode-Ede; Owojun; Popoola
Ede South	Sekona	232102	Adekolu; Agboopa; Akoda; Awoo; Bara; Dauda; Denu; Elewure; Isale-Ofa; Kusi; Laogun Araromi; Laogun Isemi; Oloki; Sekona
Egbedore	Ara	232109	Aba-Ope; Abogunde; Ajo; Alasan; Ara; Arun; Awo-Alara; Balogun; Bara; Ebunla; Falansa; Ilawe; Lado; Lamokun; Olobu Ara; Onadimu; Ooye; Yemope
Egbedore	Awo	232104	Abe-Ade; Aboguade; Adewolu; Ajeja; Akinlade; Alagbaa; Alate; Alokolejere; Awo; Ayidina; Baale; Eleran; Eniso; Gbanla; Ile-Iya-Agba; Ile-Oku; Jakoto; Kuleogbo; Ogbagada; Ojisum; Olokisa; Olope; Olufinran-Isale; Olufiran-Oke; Onilai
Egbedore	Ido-Osun	232111	Adeniran; Adeyi; Awaro; Egbedi; Fulani; Iloba; Ofatedo; Ojutu; Oke-Osun; Olojo; Olorunsogo; Oni-Malu; Ponpola
Egbedore	Ikotun	232108	Aba Ajao; Abudo; Adeyeyi; Aronwa; Ebunlaope; Eleran; Ga Fulani; Ikepa; Laroyan; Obadon; Obanisuwa; Olufiran; Woru
Egbedore	Iragberi	232107	Iragberi
Egbedore	Iwoye / Origo	232106	Alasan; Ekuro; Ekusa; Iddo; Iwoye; Origo
Egbedore	Ojo/Aro	232105	Aba Agberi; Abere; Akogun; Alaro Elemo; Areago; Aro; Asalu; Asipa; Bara; Ekerin; Ijagemo; Ilora; Imofo; Iseki; Iya Agba; Iyalode; Jagun; Lado; Oloode; Oloso; Onipara; Oose; Otun; Seriki
Egbedore	Okinni	232110	Aigbagbon; Aigbe; Alaadota; Alapupu; Ateri; Idi-Mangoro; Igbokiti (I & II); Oke-Agunbelewo
Ejigbo	Ejigbo	232116	Ayegbogbo; Ejigbo; Ike; Isundunrin; Iwata
Ejigbo	Ife-Odan	232119	Ife-Odan; Olori; Owu
Ejigbo	Ilawo	232118	Aato; Abogunde; Adegeedo; Adori-Oke; Afake; Aponla; Ayegunle; Idigba; Igbon; Ijinibota; Ika; Ilawo; Inisa I; Inisha II; Isundurin; Ologege; Olorin; Olosinmo; Osuntedo; Songbe
Ejigbo	Olla	232117	Agurodo; Aye; Isoko; Masifa; Oguro; Olla
Ife North	Ashipa / Akinlalu	220102	Aba Igbira; Aba Keesa Baje; Aiyetutu; Akinalu; Alabameta; Alasa; Amina; Ashipa Town; Awotinde; Balogun Aderibigbe; Eiyentanle; Eleeru; Eleesan; Erinle; Fagbore; Gbodowe; Idi Asa; Ige; Ita Agbede; Lemomu; Morakinyo; Oba-Giun; Ogangan; Ogundijo; Oke; Olorombo; Otunode; Segi; Tafa; Titus Aba-Store; Wasinmi
Ife North	Edunabon	220104	Adanrin; Ade; Afon; Agada; Akinobu; Akunra; Alalara-Anusun; Alawiye; Amoloye; Amula Orile; Apesibiti; Balogun-Obiribiri; Edunabon; Ejemu; Elemu-Alagba; Elerin; Isule; Lamba-Agbere; Loode Olokuta; Morayin; Ogbaagba-Alagbede; Ojurejo Olorjo; Ologungun; Olorombo-Gboloku; Onikan; Osifila; Osun; Pakolo
Ife North	Famia	220105	Aba Ode; Adedeji; Adekunmi; Agidi; Ajiboye; Akande; Aladanla; Alafa; Alagba; Amugba; Apaana; Arileyansi; Arinola; Asabi; Asamu; Ata Mogaji; Awere; Ayankunle; Baala; Baale; Baale Sango; Dare; Dooya; Elegudugbe; Fagbemiro; Fagunwa; Famia; Famia Ayegunle; Famia Oja; Fasanu; Gorogoro; Idi-Iroko; Isaleye; Jabata; Jatina-Egbeda; Kilanko; Kinkinyinun; Lemomu; Makinde; Obalejugbe; Odogbon; Oduranin; Ogundijo; Okuomoni; Ologede; Olookun; Olooyo; Omikoto; Onikooko; Onipasan; Onirugbon; Onisoro; Otun Akala; Owode; Oyo Onikeke; Rogborogbo; Salako
Ife North	Ipetumodu (Rural)/Yakoyo	220101	Adara; Ade; Adesina; Agbonni; Agodo; Ajala; Akibiti; Akingbade; Areago; Asalu; Atula; Baadofin; Egbirin; Fabemi; Fadipe; Fawei Baale; Igbira; Igbira Iwaro; Lamiriki; Majarayomi; Mojalao; Oba; Ode Awosun; Ogun; Oguntoyinbo; Ogunwale; Oke; Oke-Ladugbo; Ologbo; Ologiri; Olorode Ageye; Olunle; Olunloye/Akinwowo; Peleyeju; Yakoyo
Ife North	Moro	220103	Aba Moro; Agbe Baale-Idowu; Agbe Oosa-Egbeniyi; Arojo; Awotunbi; Bale Alebiosu; Dado Olokotun; Elewa; Idioro; Moro; Odan Asun
Ife North	Oyere I	220107	Idita; Iyekere; Onibambu; Oriokuta; Oyo; Toro
Ife North	Oyere II	220106	Aba Adetipe; Aba Anubidi; Aba Dejo; Aba gbadamu; Aba Kendere; Aba Obalara; Aba Onigbo; Aba Osunremi; Aba Salami; Aba Tiamiyu; Aborisade; Agboro; Akinbade; Akire; Alapata; Amukegun; Aniwe; Apamu; Apata Oloko; Asujo; Atuwo Amu; Baba Ebe; Dagbolu; Dairo; Fadehan; Fagbesa; Fanikun; Idi Seke; Idioro; Ilabami; Isanlu; Kereja; Kilibi; Ladapo; Obeyin; Odelade; Olu-Igbodo; Womonle
Ife South	Abiri	220115	Aba Abe; Aba Aderibe; Aba Aladie; Aba Alaja; Aba Baale; Aba Lowa-Ada; Aba Lowa-Iyelomo; Aba Oba; Aba Odeyemi (Jaiyeoba); Aba Ouda; Aba Oyalode; Aba Semolu; Aba T.O. (Fede); Abiri Lasore; Akinitioke; Aye Isale; Aye Oke; Dagbolu; Daranjo; Gborogboro; Ijimakin; Jaaran; Jackson; Obafari-Ayeteju; Ogudu; Ogudu Famole; Olokemeji; Oloromobo; Opa Aje
Ife South	Aye-Amodo	220112	Aba Atiba; Aba Iresi; Aba Titus; Abewale; Adereti; Aje Bandele-Lukosi; Alapadi; Anrodo; Atere; Aye Amodu; Ayeoba; Bolajoko; Ilako Oko Ere; Iyalode; Mode; Moro; Obgagba; Odo Ibule; Okusu Isale; Okusuoke; Yakoyo
Ife South	Ifetedo	220108	Aba Aliyu; Aba D.F. Kolajo; Aba Dada; Aba Faro; Aba Golu; Aba Ife; Aba Raji; Adesigbin; Ago Oluwu; Ajegbinrin; Aleahanran; Asawure; Baba Ibadan; Bolorunduro; Ebgejoda; Ere; Erinoke; Fabamira; Fadeyi; Idi-Obi; Ifetedo Township; Imolengbalafia; Jagilegbo; Kole Akinjola; Kongo; Lusoye; Odebunmi; Ogbon Ayesan; Ogedengbe; Okesoda; Ologiri; Oloparun; Olorombo; Omosebi; Onikanga; Orafidiya; Oragbade; Oriola; Owusunmomi; Surulere; Taroko
Ife South	Kere	220111	Aba Aafa; Abewale; Adereti; Amu Fagbewesa; Amu-Igbo; Apata Oloko; Apoje; Araromi; Atoba; Awurele; Esena; Iponrin; Kere; Oke-Odo; Ologede; Olomuoba; Olomuoja; Olorunda; Oshogbo; Osogun; Poso Obutu; Posu Adedire
Ife South	Mefoworade Omifunfun /	220110	Aba Mama; Aba Mathew; Aba Pastor; Afolabi; Agbaje; Agbele; Aiyetorojera; Ajebandele-Dadehan; Araromi; Atetedaye; Awosiyan; Bolorunduro; Elegberun; Fasure; Idi Ogun Sanni; Idi Ogun-Adedire; Ita Agba; Kaledun; Mefoworade; Obajida; Ologbenla; Olomidudu; Omifunfun; Onigbodogi; Orisunbare; Poyika Adewumi; Poyika Ogunleye; Poyika Onikoko; Sekunde; Sukulubi
Ife South	Oke-Owena /Gbengbeleku/	220109	Aba Mathew; Aba Oba; Ajabandele; Akinyele; Alabameta; Amula odunlade; Amula Saliu; Amusan; Baba Eko; Bolorunduro; Camp-Obele; Fadaka; Falola; Gbengbeleku; Idi Ogun; Ikeketu; Natha; Odesan; Ogunsakin; Oke Owena; Okoro Elusoji; Okoro-Isaiah; Olorombo; Oru-Alayinde; Sunbere; Yinmi; Yinmi Oja
Ife South	Olode	220113	Aba Ijesha; Aba Natha; Aba Oyinbo; Aba Stephen; Aba Titun-Balogun; Agbombiti; Agbon Paul; Alatere; Araromi; Arode; Eleweran; Elewure Oke; Elewure-Isale; Garage Olode; Idi Ako; Idi Ogun Sanni; Labata; Odemuyiwa; Olode; Omidi Onipetesi; Omidire; Sekunde Isanlu; Sekunde-Ibadan
Ife South	Osi / Ara / Joshua	220114	Aba Andrew; Aba Edunabon; Aba Kajola; Aba Ode; Aba Ojo; Aba Oni; Agbiri; Agbonkuta; Ajagbegun; Ajegunle; Albert; Alutierin; Apata; Ara Akinloye; Ara Joshua; Ara Oosa; Arugbosegbe; Eeelu; Idi Ogun-Wogun; Isoyo; Ita Orunto; Jagun Osin; Obere; Olorombo; Onikoto Esera; Osi Luobe; Osi Sooko; Osiokero; Walode
Ifedayo	Oke Ila	234103	Aworo Ayedaade; Balogun; Ejemu; Idi Awere; Ilupeju; Obaale; Obaloja; Obanla
Ifedayo	Ora	234102	Abanju Akesin; Aganju Asaoni; Oyi Adumi; Oyi Araromi; Temidire
Ila	Ila	234101	Aba Ododo; Abalagemo; Ajaba; Alagbede; Ayetoro Obaaro; Edemosi; Ejigbo-Orangun; Gaa Fulani; Idi Odan; Idi Ogbagbara; Ila; Isinmi Olootu; Oore; Oyi Adunni; Oyi Araromi; Oyi Ayegunle
Irewole	Ikire	221104	Arinkin; Ayetoro; Balogun; Bamgbola; Bamidele; Fidiwo; Ikire Township; Majeroku; Molarere; Odeyinka; Oloowa; Wasinmi
Isokan	Apomu	221105	Afijogba; Afolu; Alabamejo; Alagbede; Alahun; Alara; Apomu; Aro Kekere; Aronla; Awala; Awala Japo; Baare; Bodunde; Bodundekoro; Elebanla; Idi Eeegu; Kagbadanla; Kajola; Katesan; Kekere; Labu; Ladaru; Mogun; Mowo Ejemu; Odofin; Ogundiran; Oju-Ona; Olaleye; Olokuta; Omolowo; Opelade; Oran Eemu; Otun Ojeyemi; Pannu; Riti Egbeda; Sunbare
Isokan	Ikoyi	221106	Abelebiyi; Abidemi; Afoluoba; Ajebamidele; Ajolode; Akoogun; Alakeji; Alamo; Ikoyi; Olonjo; Oloya; Onilewo; Sakotun
Iwo	Agberire	232102	Adana; Afiku; Afingba; Agbede; Agberire; Agbodan; Agbona; Akinde; Alapo; Alebiosu; Ameree; Anaru; Ape; Arusa; Awuje; Elemi; Elemo; Fagbayibi; Idi-Iroko; Ikire Ile; Ikolaba; Iwara; Iyangan; Jagun; Kanna; Kekere; Lemomu; Molare; Motunase; Obajoko; Obutu; Ofisan; Ogburo; Ogede; Ogundangogo; Ogunju; Ologun Ogunjana; Olokodudu; Olubusan; Olupo Jolu; Omoba; Omosan-Igbo; Osa Ogunala; Osunjobi; Papa; Sade; Tantan; Yakoyo
Iwo	Iwo	232101	Iwo Township
Obokun	Eesun/Ido-Oko	233128	Atanra; Eesun; Ere; igogo; lbala; ldi-Oko; ljana; ljaregbe; Oke-Opa
Obokun	Esa Odo	233127	Esa Odo
Obokun	Esa-Oke	233130	Esa-Oke; Farm-Settlement; Ido Ayegunle
Obokun	Ibokun	233122	Ada Owode; Amele; Apalara; Ibokun; Ipetu Ile; Itiya; Matawin; Okegun; Olobe; Saloro; Sawe; Ase-Ijesa
Obokun	Ilahun / Ikinyinwa	233123	Gbogidigbo; Ikinyinwa; Ilahun; Odo-Opa
Obokun	Ilare	233126	Afolabi; Ajioku; Egigun; Eriro; lgun; llare
Obokun	Ilase / Idominasi	233124	Ajegunle; Alafon; Coker; Idoka; Idominasi; llase; llowa; lponda; lregun; Oke Osun; Oke-Oro; Olorunda; Oniyere; Oota; Owasanmi
Obokun	Imesi-Ile	233129	Imesi-Ile
Obokun	Otan-Ile	233125	Otan-lle
Odo Otin	Asi / Asaba /Oyan	231107	Asaba; Asi; Oyan
Odo Otin	Ekosin / Iyeku	231104	EIesin-Funfun; Ekosin; Iyeku; Kosemani; Oiakunmodu; Olokumodo
Odo Otin	Faji/Opete/ Igbaye	231105	Ago Ayo; Faji; Idiroko; Igbaye; Imuleke; Opete
Odo Otin	Ijabe/ Ila / Odo	231106	Alapata; Igbotele; Ijabe; Ila-Odo; Opanda
Odo Otin	Inisa / Obe / Agbeye	231103	Agbeye; Inisa; Ore
Odo Otin	Okua / Ekusa	231102	Ekusa; Okua
Odo Otin	Okuku	231101	Adegbite; Okuku
Ola Oluwa	Ajagba / Iwo Oke	232111	Ajagba; Elewedu; Elewure; Iwo Oke; Jagunode Ofa; Kekere; Mogbelerin; Molaye; Olota; Olupe; Oluponia; Tankoda
Ola Oluwa	Asa/Ajagun-lase	232110	Aba Ajuba; Adebiopon; Afingba; Agogo Ogun; Aigbede; Ajagunlase; Aladorun; Asa; Balogun Oja; Dagbelu; Dagbolu; Elere; Idiya; Nka; Ododo; Ogunoja; Okoro; Olota; Tarapin; Yamganmu
Ola Oluwa	Asamu	232114	Aba Junadu; Aba Lemomu; Alawoloko; Aromole; Asamu; Ilamodu; Ile Ajo; Ile Kuta; Kinko; Laafe; Oke Igan; Oke Ogun; Olukotun; Olusenwo; Oniyangi; Orilowo; Orisasa; Parakoyi
Ola Oluwa	Bode Osi	232107	Alagbon; Aloro; Bode Osi; Elepo; Elesu; Idi Oro; Jagun; Molosayowo; Olowo; Paku Odan
Ola Oluwa	Ikire Ile / Iwara	232108	Afiku; Afingba; Agbede; Agbodan; Akinde; Alapo; Alebiosu; Ameree; Ape; Arusa; Elemi; Fagbauibi; Idi-Iroko; Ikire Ile; Ikolaba; Iwara; Iyangan; Jagun; Kanna; Kekere; Lemomu; Molare; Ofisan; Ogede; Ogundangogo; Olokodudu; Olubusan; Omoba; Omosan-Igbo; Osunjobi; Sade; Tantan
Ola Oluwa	Isero / Ikonifin	232115	Aba Ayo; Aba Gogoru; Aba Onju; Ajegunle; Apabo; Ayede; Fulani Jagun; Ibadan; Ikonifin; Isero; Kadiri; Olala; Oloparun; Oodi; Yemoja
Ola Oluwa	Obamoro/Ile-Ogo	232109	Adunmode; Aguntan; Aladorin; Apeke; Elesu; Fagbayibi; Feesu; Ikalaba; Ile Ogo; Ile-Ogo; Imoru; Obamore; Obamoro; Olota; Orilende; Otunjagun
Ola Oluwa	Ogbaagba	232112	Aba Odan; Asati; Igege; Mogaji; Ogbaagba; Olukotun; Toto
Ola Oluwa	Telemu	232113	Agbowu; Akoti; Eeleke; Mogbidun; Olopalamba; Telemu
Olorunda	Oba-Ife/Oba-Oke	230105	Abegunde; Ajala; Ajegunle; Aliyu; Aminu; Amusun; Aro Elemo; Awokunle; Awoniyi; Awoyale; Elemo; Esa; Folarin; Idi Ape; Idi Osan; Idiape; Jagun; Odesola; Odofin; Ogundele; Ojomu; Oke; Okemole; Oloba Oke; Olobaile; Olorunda; Olukotun; Oluode; Onigiloro; Osolo; Saba
Oriade	Erinmo / Iwaraja	233117	Erinmo; Ijimo; Iwaraja; Omo-Ijesha, Oke-Ana Ijesa
Oriade	Erin-Oke/Erin-Ijesa	233118	Erin-Ijesa; Erin-Oke; Igbelajewa
Oriade	Ijebu-Jesa Rural	233114	Aba Lawani; Ijaregbe; Itegun
Oriade	Ijeda / Iloko	233116	Ijeda; Iloko
Oriade	Ipo Arakeji	233121	Alajale; Alagbe; Akunrin; Christ Apostolic Church; Igbo Reserve; Ita Ata; Joseph Ayo Babalola University; Odo Ipo; Oiyo; Oju Oja; Ogbon Oyo; Omo Afa
Oriade	Ikeji-Arakeji	233121	Akeji; Ikeji Arakeji; Olori-Oko; Owena Ijesa
Oriade	Ikeji-Ile	233119	Ikeji-Ile; Oko Orisakeji; Olobe-Ide
Oriade	Ipetu-Ijesa	233120	Adedeji; Afinbiokin; Alabameta; Apoti; Asalu; Bolorunduro; Dagbaja; Ipetu Jesa; Lawaye; Oko; Oloruntedo; Onikoko; Orisunbare; Sawe
Oriade	Iwoye	233115	Eti Oni; Ilo Ayegunle; Iwoye
Orolu	Ifon	230102	Abegunde; Ajala; Ajegunle; Aliyu; Aminu; Amusun; Aro Elemo; Asalu; Awokunle; Awoniyi; Awoyale; Bara; Barohun; Basorun; Bolorunduro; Egan Aje; Elemo; Esa; Folarin; Idi Ape; Idi Iroko; Idi Osan; Idiape; Idiya; Ifon; Ikimo; Jagun; Kajola; Laarope; Molufon; Odesola; Odofin; Ofe Bolo; Ogundele; Ogunkeye; Ojomu; Oke; Okemole; Oloba Oke; Olobaile; Ologede; Olorunda; Olukutun; Oluode; Onigari; Onigiloro; Onsokun; Osolo; Osun Esa; Owode; Saba

== By electoral ward ==
Below is a list of polling units, including villages and schools, organised by electoral ward.

LGA	Ward	Polling Unit Name
Atakumosa East	Iwara	Town Hall Iwara; Unity Pry. School, Iwara; L.A. School, Iwikun; Methodist Pry. School, Ayetoro; L.A. Pry. School, Ajebandele Asuku; Open Space Iyinta; Open Space Odo-Iwara
Atakumosa East	Igangan	N.U.D Pry. Schol, Igangan; St. Barth School, Igangan; Apostolic Pry. School, Oko-Ago; St. Luke's School, Owode; Open Space Ajumobi; Open Space Sajuku
Atakumosa East	Ipole	Town Hall, Ipole; Town Hall Odo Ijesa; St. Andrew Ise-Ijesa; L.A. School, Imogbara; Open Space Irogbo/Ijemba; St. John Pry. School, Idado
Atakumosa East	Iperindo	Town Hall Iperindo I; Town Hall Iperindo II; Temidire Grammar School, Iperindo; Matt. Cent Ago Isegun; Comm. Pry. School, Oke Egun; Comm. Pry. School, Kajola; Cent. Pry. School, Aasa; Open Space Ayeni/Temidire
Atakumosa East	Eti-Oni	Eti Oni Open Space; L.A. Pry. School, Aladodo; Ang. Pry. School, Alarere; Court Hall Itapa; Maternity Centre, Iloro; Open Space Temidire I; Open Space, Temidire II
Atakumosa East	Ayegunle	St. Luke's Odogbo; L.A. Pry. School, Ajido; Comm. Pry. School, Faro; C.A.C. Pry. School Akanni; Open Space Aladura; Itamerin
Atakumosa East	Forest Reserve 1	L.A. Pry. School Onigbogi; Open Space Onigbogi; Sokoto I; Sokoto II; Sokoto S. B Ojo; Ogundele; Owada
Atakumosa East	Forest Reserve II	Number; Grammar School Alaka; L.A. School Labosipo; Timolaja Arowojobe; L.A. School Arewa; Alonge/Fajuke
Atakumosa East	Faforiji	St. Felix Pry. School Faforiji I; St. Felix Pry. School Faforiji II; Town Hall Faforiji; Agbon Jegede; Suraju Pry. School, Erinsebija; Comm. Pry. School Omi-Odo; Comm. Pry. School Abatuntun; Ehin-Oke
Atakumosa West	Osu I	Methodist Primary School, Oke Oja - Osu; C & S Pry. School, Osu (Opposite Hm's Office); Aruaji, Osu; Atakunmosa High School, Osu
Atakumosa West	Osu II	Apostolic Pry School, Iwaro; Pry School, Iloba; Bara Village; Pry School, Alakowe; Ayorunbo Village; Odesomi Village; Pry School, Sasa; R. C. M. Pry. School, Kajola; Comm. Pry. School, Asaobi; Balogun Village; Kanye Village
Atakumosa West	Osu III	Methodist Pry. School, Okeomi, Osu; Methodist Pry. School, Osu; L.A. Pry. School, Ilowo St. Osu; Pry. School, Itamerin; Comm. Grammar School, Ajido, Osu
Atakumosa West	Ibodi	Comm. Grammar School, Ibodi; Temidire Pry. School, Ibodi; Igila Village; Iyere Village; Osun State Coll. Of Education; Ilotin Village
Atakumosa West	Ifelodun	Epe Village; Ijana Village; Odo Iju Village; Iyemogun Village; Methodist Pry. School, Igun; Apepe Village
Atakumosa West	Itagunmodi	Town Hall, Itagunmodi I; Town Hall, Itagunmodi II; Alaba/Owena Village (Open Space); Araromi Village; Oke Ipa Village (Open Space); Arigbabu Village (Open Space)
Atakumosa West	Oke Bode	Oju Oja Okebode; St. John Pry. School, Oke-Bode; Abebeyun/Isedo Pry. Schol; Oke-Osin Pry. School; L.A. Pry. School, Kajola; Araromi Kajola; Laala Village; Asipa/Saloro; L.A. Pry. School, Gidigbi; Maternity Centre, Osunjela
Atakumosa West	Isa Obi	Isaobi Pry. School; Inasin Village; Risawe Village; Itaosan Village
Atakumosa West	Muroko	Muroko/Oke-Awo; St. James Pry. School, Ilaa; L.A. School, Isolo; Iloya Village; Ipoye Village; Esira Village
Atakumosa West	Ifewara I	Town Hall, Ifewara; Ogogodoja Village; Agbabiaka Village; N.U.D. Pry. School, Ifewara
Atakumosa West	Ifewara II	St. Dominic Pry. School, Ifewara; Ifewara High School I; Ifewara High School II; Aba Orunto; Maternity Ifewara
Ayedaade	Otun Balogun	St. Peter's Pry. School I, Oke Apata Gbongan; St. Peter's Pry. School II, Oke Apata Gbongan; Community Hall Oke Ola Area, Gbongan; Ile Olojin Ile Olojin Area, Gbongan; Oke Rorun, Obada Area, Gbongan; Ile Moyegun, Obada Area, Gbongan
Ayedaade	Olufi	Court Hal, Customary Court, Gbongan; Obadoore Customary Court, Gbongan; E.D.C. Pry School, I, Owoope, Owope Area; E.D.C. Pry. School, 11, Owoope, Owoope Area; N.U.D. School, Oke-Ola, Oke-Ola Area; Ile Akanti / Ojude Aseda, Akanti Comp. Gbongan; Oke Irorun Junction, Ajegunle Area
Ayedaade	Otun-Olufi	A.U.D. Ayepe, Gbayanrin Area Gbongan I; Maternity Ajegunle, Oke Elu Area, Gbongan I; Maternity Ajegunle, Oke Elu Area, Gbongan II; St. Paul's Pry. School, Oke Church Area, Gbongan I; St. Paul's Pry. School, Oke Church Area, Gbongan II; D. C. School 1, Oke Offa, Oke Offa Area Gbongan; D. C. School, II, Oke Offa, Oke Offa Area, Gbongan; E.D.C. School, Araromi, Adenuga Area, Gbongan; St. Martin's Pry School, Iwo Road, Gbongan; Palace Road, Onidele, Oke Ofa Area, Gbongan; Abekoko, Abekoko Area, Gbongan; Oja Ayepe, I, Ayepe Market, Gbongan; Oja Ayepe II, Ayepe Market, Gbongan; Orita Oke Offa, Oke Offa Area Gbongan
Ayedaade	Ijegbe/Oke-Eso/Oke-Owu Ijugbe	Court Hall I, Behind Arab Bank, Ode-Omu; Court Hall II, Behind Arab Bank Ode-Omu; D. C. School, Oke Eso, Oke Eso, Area Ode Omu; D. C. School, Oke Eso, Oke Eso Area Odeomu; Igbira Isale Area, Igbira Village Ode Omu; St. David's Grammar School, Iwo Road, Ode Omu; A.U.D. Oke Ode Area Oke Ode Area Ode Omu; Oke-Owu Hall I, Oke Owu Area Odeomu; Oke-Owu Hall II, Oke-Owu Area Odeomu; Oke-Owu Hall III, Oke-Owu Area, Ode-Omu; Ile Oso Aro Area, Ile Oso Aro, Ode Omu; Olusunde Area, Olusunde Comp. Odeomu; Ketu Area, Ketu Area Ode Omu; Oluseyi Hall, Fajob's Comp. Ode-Omu; Orona Area, Orona Comp. Ode Omu; Igbira Oke Area, Igbira Village Odeomu; Bara Olueju, Comp. Ode Omu
Ayedaade	Lagere/Amola	St. Pius, Amola Area, Ode Omu; St. Pius Amola Area, Ode Omu; D. C. Amola, Amola Area, Ode Omu; St. Michael Grammar School, Obada Area, Ode Omu; A.U.D. Pry. School, Oke Odo Lagere Area, Ode Omu; The Apostolic School, Idi Asa's Comp. Odeomu; St. David. S Primary School, Obada Area, Odeomu; Idiose, Ile Oke Ode Omu; Alagbagun Hall, Ala-Gbagun Hall, Odeomu; Alagbaa, Ile Alagbaa Ode Omu; Lewere I, Lewere Comp. Odeomu; Lewere II, Lewere Comp. Odeomu; Dispensary, Ile Idi Asa, Ode Omu; Onile Area, Ile Onile Aran, Odeomu; Oluwo Junction Ile Oluwo, Odeomu; Onitokun Area, Onitokun Comp. Odeomu
Ayedaade	Gbongan Rural	D. C. Akowide Akowide Village; Ogbaagba Ogbaagba Village; Wakajaiye I; Wakajaiye II; Oloba Village, Oloba Village; Lagbaka, Lagbaka Village; Mojapa, Mojapa Village; Akiriboto I. St. Peter's, Akiriboto I; Akiriboto II, St. David's, Akiriboto II; Akiriboto III, St. David's Akiriboto III; Akiriboto Alabe, Akiriboto Village; Oluwada, Oluwada Village; Alagbede Village; Bembe Village; Akinjepo Village; Elekiri Balogun Omole, Elekiri Balogun; Onimu Village
Ayedaade	Ode-Omu Rural	Kaje Onisango, Kaje Onisango Village; D. C. School, Lasolei, Lasole Village; D. C. School, Lasole II, Lasole Village; C.A.C. Ayetoro, Tonkere Village; Court Hall Tonkere, Tonkere Town; St. Jame's Tonkere, Tonkere Town; St. Stephen Oogi, Oogi Town; St. Matthew's Ejemu, Ejemu Village; Ojudo Village, Ojudo Village; Agbungu, Agbungu Village; Alagbede Baale Village, Alagbede Village
Ayedaade	Obalufon	St. Luke's School I, Oke Eso Orile Owu; St. Luke's School II, Oke Eso, Orile Owu; Dabongbe, Dabongbe Village; Gbeke Hall, Gbeke Area, Orile Owu; Gbeke Hall, Gbeke Village; Fowosere, Fowosere Village; Baba Ijo, Baba Ijo Village; Aba Ibadan, Aba Ibadan Village; Atoba Village, Atoba Village; Abewela Village, Abewela Village
Ayedaade	Anlugbua	Gbogbo Village, Gbogbo Village, Orile Owu; Oluwo Compd. Oluwo Compd, Orile Owu; Farm Settlement, Farm Settlement, Orileowu; Sabo I, Sabo Area; Sabo II, Sabo Area; St. Peter's School, Oke Ola, Orile Owu; St. Peter's School, Oke Ola Orile Owu; Court Hall, Ojuoja, Orile Owu; Court Hall, Oju Oja, Orile Owu; Baptist Pry. School, Apena Area, Orile Owu; Bapt. Pry. School, Apena Area, Orile Owu; Motako 1, Motako Village; Motako II, Motako Village; Ope Ayoola, Ope Ayoola Village; Gbona, Gbonna Village; Abimbola Village, Abimbola Village; Motaka Ojetunde, Motaka Ojetunde Village; Alagbede, Alagbede Village; Community Pry. School Alabameta; Alaguntan, Alaguntan Village; Barawo, Barawo Village
Ayedaade	Araromi-Owu	Araromi Owu I Town; Araromi Owu II Town; Araromi Owu Market; Sangodiran, Sangodiran Village; Idi Iroko, Idi Iroko Village; Mokore, Mokore Village; Ajegunle, Ajegunle Village
Ayedire	Oluponna 1	Community Pry. School, Alaya; D. C. School, Adenlere, Adenlere; Methodist Pry. School, Iwo Railway Station; Oluponna Town Hall I; Oluponna Town Hall II
Ayedire	Oluponna 1i	D. C. School, Oluponna; Baptist School, Oluponna; Ojisun Open Space; Ode Ote/Ejemu Market
Ayedire	Oluponna 1ii	Araromi Market I; Araromi Market II; Araromi Market III; Saint John's School, Waasinmi; D. C. School, Olori/Oduwo
Ayedire	Oke-Osun	Christ Anglican School, Elesin; Iyana Ikire Open Space; A.U.D School, Eleji; Community High School, Onigangan; N.U.D. School, Ileiran; A.U.D. Abanikanda; D. C. School, Alagbaa; Mamu/Abimbola; Olorunda Market; Laitan Village; Ajebandele Village
Ayedire	Ileogbo I	Idi Ore Market; Luther King's College, Ileogbo; Methodist Pry. School, Ileogbo; N.U.D. School, Ileogbo I; N.U.D. School, Ileogbo II; Kobiowu Open Space
Ayedire	Ileogbo II	Idi Ape Open Space; Methodist School Open Space; Alaran Open Space; Court Hall, Ileogbo; Alawe Open Space
Ayedire	Ileogbo III	Olude Open Space; Idi-Ogun Open Space; Comprehensive Health Centre, Ileogbo; Age's Compd. Ileogbo
Ayedire	Ileogbo IV	Asipa Open Space; African Church Area, Open Space; Gbogbo Open Space; Ayi Open Space
Ayedire	Kuta I	Court Hall, Kuta; A.U.D. School, Ikoyi/Kuta; Alagbede's Compd. Kuta; Dispensary, Kuta; Olunlade Open Space
Ayedire	Kuta II	Saint Peter African Church School, Kuta; A/C Methodist Pry School, Railway Station; Ile Alaye; C. M. S School, Iloro; Ode Oosa Open Space
Boluwaduro	Oke-Omi Otan	St. Philip's Pry. School; Isale Obaala; Ita Dada; Legiri; St. Nicholas Pry. School; Odohun; Brick Layer's Hall; Alaafa/Igbodu; Oke Akangbe
Boluwaduro	Oke Ode Otan	Olosan; Agbesola; Ojude Aro; Court Hall/Town Hall; Imojigbon; Obada Market; Alafe Okero
Boluwaduro	Oke-Otan	Ejemu Ororo; Oke Anaye; Alaremu; N.U.D Pry. School I; N.U.D. Pry. School II; Gaa Fulani; Oroki
Boluwaduro	Gbeleru Obaala I	Kiriji Memorial College; Baptist Pry. School; Africa Pry. School; Library; Town Hall; Ayetoro Village
Boluwaduro	Gbeleru Obaala II	Esile Recreation Hall I; Esile Recreation Hall II; C & S Pry. School; Odofin Community Hall; Aragba Village; Kajola/Ogundeji Village; Osoro/Ajegunle Village; Budo Kiriji Village
Boluwaduro	Obala Iloro	Catholic Pry. School; Community High School; Iloro Market Square; Cooperative Hall; Lowankan Hall; Irepodun Village; Araromi Edi Village
Boluwaduro	Eripa	Baptist Day School; Palace Area, Open Space; Town Hall; Police Post; Old Maternity Centre; Community Grammar School; Gaa Amodu
Boluwaduro	Oke-Irun	Okerun Market Square I; Okerun Market Square II; Community Primary School; Ajebandele Village; Igbo Ita Erie Village; Igbo Nla Ayetoro; Community Grammar School
Boluwaduro	Iresi I	Oja Oba Square; Baptist Day School; Sabo Olobi; Oke Eri Square; Ogbon Odo Ode; Ago Fulani; Orokoro Pry. School
Boluwaduro	Iresi II	Town Hall; Obada Market Square; N.U.D Pry. School; Ayeriyi; Ikifin Postal Agency; Comprehensive Health Centre; Carpenters' Hall; Igbonka Village; Obuke Village
Boripe	Oloti Iragbiji	St. Peter School I, Iragbiji; L.A. School, Popo; N.E.P.A; Oke Osun; Oke - Agbo; Aromadu I; Aromadu II
Boripe	Oja - Oba	Arugba Ojomu Square Iragbiji; Town Hall Iragbiji; Baptist Pry School Iragbiji; Jagun Hall Iragbiji; Tinubu Fagbemi Iragbiji; Osolo Hall Iragbiji
Boripe	College/Egbada Road	Methodist Prymary School, Iragbiji; C.A.C. Pry. School; Araromi; Egbeda Village I; Egbeda Village II; Ayekale Village; Eleesun Village I; Eleesun Village II; L.A. School, Eesadee; Odebudo Village
Boripe	Isale-Oyo	N.U.D. Primary School, Iragbiji; Pry. Health Centre; K & S Pry. School; Ojude Ororuwo; Alade Market; Oore Community
Boripe	Ororuwo	R. C. M. Ororuwo I; R. C. M. Ororuwoo II; Market Square; Dispensary; St. Luke's Pry. School, Ororuwo
Boripe	Ada I	St. Andrew Pry. School Ada; Eesa Compound Ada; People's Bank, Ada; Jagun Osolo, Ada; Ojomu Compound, Ada; Oluode Compound, Ada
Boripe	Ada II	Baptist School Ada; Ile Alade Ada; Ojomu Compound; Obada Marketsq.; L.A. School Ada; Oke Baale Ada; Commercial School I, Ada; Commercial School II, Ada
Boripe	Isale Asa Iree	R. C. M. School Iree; Oke Maye; Motor Park; Salem School; Baptist High School I, Iree; Baptist High School II, Iree; Oke Asa Iree; Baptist Welfare Centre, Iree
Boripe	Oke Esa/Oke Ogi	Maternity, Centre, Iree; Dispensary Centre, Iree; N.U.D. Pry. School, Iree; New Post Office, Iree; Baale Itake, Iree; Ansar Ul Islam School, Iree; Anwar Uldeen School Iree
Boripe	Oke Aree	Poly. Staff. School, Iree; Court Hall, Iree; Old Post Office, Iree; N.E.P.A./P. H. C. N. Office, Iree; Iyaji Lagbedu, Iree; Iyaji Asalu, Iree; Baptist Pry. School, Iree
Ede North	Olaba/Atapara	Beside Funmi Cosmetics; Beside Omotoso House; No. 5, Olojo's Lane`; 78b Ate's Compd.; Store 5 Atapara Market; Batetu Comp.; 7 Oloba Lane; 8 Ikolaba Compd.; 8b Arinago Compd.; 16b, Ojularede Street, Alawo Compd.
Ede North	Abogunde/Sagba	16 Popo Street, Orita Bode; Sufianu Main Comp.; Fed. Polytechnic In Front Of Ramat Hall; C.A.C. Pry. School, Talafia; L.A. Pry. School, Adogbe; 12 Bisiku Lane; 127 Ojisun Comp.; Beside Lawyer Mogaji's House; Abogunde Comp.; Abogunde Comp. (Open Space); 38, Asalu Main Comp.; 53 Sagba Area, Opp. Sagba Mosque; Sagba Junction; Open Space Oniso Comp.; Iyaagba Kubiya Comp.; Ado Inaja Comp.; Baba Oya Comp.; Alagbede Comp.; Asalu Comp.; Areja Comp.; Osorundun Comp.; Infront Of Olugan Mosque
Ede North	Ologun/Agbaakin	7 Ologun Square; Odunaye Square; Aranyin Square; Open Space In Front Of Baale Ile Aranyin( Aranyin Square; Aworo Compd.; 41b Areja Square, Yidi Road; Gaa Iyalode Yidi Road; Olukolo (Idi-Ose); Open Space Tajudeen Road; No. 10 Tajudeen Road, Agbabiada; Alawo Comp.; Adodo Compound
Ede North	Olusokun	59 Alakas Compound; Bara Okusehinde Compound; Kumomi Junction Comp.; Y. T. D. School, Ojoro; Beside Olode Mosque; Abere I; Oladunjoye Abere II; Ifaosun; Olusokun Compd.; Idiomo Apena Compd.
Ede North	Alusekere	Iseki Oloti; Alusekere Junction; L.A. Pry. School, Alusekere; Owode Comm. Pry School; L.A. Pry. School, Kajola; Lapeleke Square I; Lapeleke Square II (Open Space); Idi-Oloke Motor Park; Open Space Agodo Village; Open Space Jagun Odomu Village; Open Space Aba Olasupo; Elere Egbejoda; Adejuwon Ojoro Market
Ede North	Sabo/Agbongbe I	L.A. Pry. School, Agbongbe; 7, Araromi Street Ede; 6, Sabo Street Ede; Open Space Beth-Africa Church School; Akinlade Square (Onimalu); Osun Agbeni Junction; Elerin Junction (Opp. Mosque); Elerin Junction (Open Space); Ajibolu Square Ede; Olaolu N/P School; No. 11, Bolanle's Street, Sabo
Ede North	Sabo/Agbongbe II	Beside Ebelomo Ind.; Garage: Entrance( Oke Gada); Garage Entrance Oke Gada Open Square; 12 Army Barrack's Road; Camp. Young Area (Opp. Saw Mills); Barracks Junction; No. 1, Alabi Street; No. 6, Okegada Osogbo Road, (S. K. Mech); Open Space Agbale Village; Mapo Arogun Comm. High School
Ede North	Isibo/Buari-Isola	Customary Court; 10, Otun Omide Square; Beside The Town Hall; In Front Of Town Hall; Daudu Folarin Comp.; 150a Station Road Ede; Beside Olubonku Bridge; Sooro/Abangbe Inf. Of Mosque; 56, Akoda Comp. S Agate Road; Pere Lane I; Pere Lane II Open Space; Beside Daudu Olagunju's Mosque; Agbala (Beh. Coop. Building)
Ede North	Apaso	11, Laoye; Infront Otanioku Comp.; 1 Ayope Comp.; 18, Jariogun Comp.; Agboja Comp.; Open Space Agunleyinju Comp.; 28, Agberi Comp. Opp. Mosque; 133, Ojularede St. Oniso Comp.; 133, Ojularede St.(Open Space); 32, Apaso Junction Ede
Ede North	Asunmo	Alapa Junction, Ede; Open Spacetalafia Imam, Ede; Open Space Olosun Comp. Ede; Open Space Oke Ogosun, Ede
Ede North	Bara Ejemu	Beside Mugba Mosque; Awo Comp.; Bara Ejemu Comp.; Infront Of Bara Ejemu; Amosun Comp.; 11, Agboko (In Front Of Nitel); Aipola Comp.
Ede South	Babanla/Agate	L.A. School, Obada, Ede; Agate Square, Ede; Babanla Square, Ede; Alukagun Comp. Ede; Fajo's Compound, Ede; Lakonu's Ogbaarayin's Comp. Ede; Olumole's Comp. Ede
Ede South	Kuye	Abati's Comp., Ede; Kuye's Compound, Ede; Oloki Junction, Ede; Ooye's Comp., Ede
Ede South	Jagun/Jagun	20, Ojularede St.; 33, Ojularede St. (Open Space); 38, Ojularede St.; 42, Otepe Comp. Agbangudu; Otepe Comp. Agbagudu (Open Space); 12, Jagun Comp.; 48, Agbangudu St. (Jagun Area); Jagun Ago Motor Park; Olun Gbele Comp.; 16, Orita Akala; Bapt. Pry. School, Isekioloro
Ede South	Alajue I	Alajue, Bode Street, Ede; Alajue Square, Idi Arere; St. Peters Pry. School, Ede; Oba Laoye Grammar School, Ede I; Oba Laoye Grammar School, Ede II; Ode-Oke; Adetooto Street, (Maricas Junction); Anuolu Junction; Opp. Seventh Day I Pry. School; Opp. Seventh Day II Pry. School (Open Space ); Ededimeji Village
Ede South	Alajue II	Orisumbare Village; L.A. School, Ponpola; Y. T. D. Ogbaagba; L.A. School, Alajue I; L.A. School, Alajue II; Aminiwon Village; L.A. School, Agbinpa Village; Dispensary Idiagbon Village
Ede South	Olodan	Idi-Oro Village; L.A. School, Olodan I; L.A. School, Olodan II; St. Luke's Pry. School, Arola; Gaga Village
Ede South	Babasanya	Babasanya Comp. Ede; Agbanu's Comp. Ede; Mosa/Onidodo, Ede; Ile-Ori Oke Comp. Ede; Olorin Junction, Ede
Ede South	Sekona	Maternity Centre, Sekona; Opp. Bapt. Church, Sekona; Oke-Oja Junction, Sekona; C.A.C. Pry. School, Sekona; St. Peter's School, Sekona; Aba Bara I; Aba Bara II; Maternity Centre, Ere-Osun
Ede South	Oloki/Akoda	Akoda Village; L.A. Pry. School, Oloki; Islamic Pry. School, Olorunda I; Islamic Pry School, Olorunda II; Elewure Village; Ogobi Village; Ayegbami Village; Community Pry. School, Oluwere
Ede South	Loogun	Y. T. D. Pry. School, Araromi Logun I; Y. T. D. Pry. School, Araromi Logun II; Aladun Osun Village; C.A.C Pry. School, Egbeda Loogun; Otagere Village; Deenu Village; Loogun/Isemi; Akinbode Village
Egbedore	Awo/Abudo	Baptist Day Pry. School, Awo; Town Hall, Awo; Abudo Village; Abudo Community Pry. School; Olokusa Village
Egbedore	Ido-Osun	Ido Osun Town Hall; Ido-Osun Town Hall Area; Ido-Osun Dispensary Premises; Ido-Osun Dispensary Area; Community Pry. School, Egbedi; New Motor Park, Ido-Osun
Egbedore	Ira Gberi I	Iragberi Town Hall; Ejemu Area; Isale Aro Area
Egbedore	Ira Gberi II	Baptist Day Pry. School, Iragberi; Bada Area Iragberi; Olosi Area Iragberi; Daodu Area, Iragberi
Egbedore	Iwoye/Idoo/Origo	Iwoye Dispensary; Idoo Village; Ekuro Village; Kitibi Village
Egbedore	Ojo/Aro	Baptist Day Pry School, Ojo; Baptist Day Pry. School, Aro
Egbedore	Okinni/Olorunsogo/Ofatedo	Dada Estate Olorunsogo; Osun Bukola Junction; Okubanjo Printing Press Area; Isale Osun Ofatedo; St. Georges R. C. M Pry. School, Ofatedo; Oke-Oja Ofatedo; Okogun Area Okinni; St. Johns' Pr. School, Okinni; Y. T. D. Pry. School, Okinni; Igbokiti Pry. School, Igbokiti
Ejigbo	Elejigbo 'A'	Ejigbo Town Hall; Abieku Area; R. C. M. Pry. School; Begi-Opp. Nepa; Bada Sakasaka; Evang/Omo-Oye
Ejigbo	Elejigbo 'B'/Osolo	E. B. H. S. Ejigbo; A.U.D. Pry. School, I; A.U.D. Pry. School, II; Oba Abidjan/Alaran; Ojude Osolo; Aromadu; Ejigbo Shopping Complex; Ife-Odan Motor Park; Fire Station; D. C. School, Iwo Road; Idi-Ape Ejigbo; Obelawo Quarters; Alukoso Junction; Moyofade Com. Bank; Orita Enla Adekanbi
Ejigbo	Elejigbo 'C'/Mapo	Beulah Bapt. School, Ejigbo; Ogbomoso Motor Park; Ode-Bara Market Stall; Maternity Centre, Popo; Nepa; Ejigbo Secretariat Complex; Ope Olori Meji
Ejigbo	Elejigbo 'D'/Ejemu	Oke Balogun Bapt. Day School; Olowola/Ologbin; Magistrate Court; Idi-Oro Junction; Idi-Seke Area; Oke Odo Ilupeju I; Oke Odo Ilupeju II; Apanpa Ajila Osunfiade
Ejigbo	Elejigbo/Ayegbogbo	Ejigbo Shop Complex; C.A.C. Pry. School, 1; Asalu/Akinde; Ayegbogbo Dispensary; Dakolebu Junction; Akuru Junction
Ejigbo	Ola/Aye/Agurodo	Ola Postal Agency; State Health Centre, Ola; Ola /Iware Junction; Merin-Mefon, Ola; Aye, Market Junction; Agurodo Market Square; Proposed Health Centre, Agurodo
Ejigbo	Ifeodan 'A'/Owu-Ile	Ife-Odan Town Hall; Ife-Odan Postal Agency I; Ife-Odan Postal Agency II; Oke Afin/Iwo Ate, Ife-Odan; Owu-Ile, Near Palace
Ejigbo	Ifeodan 'B'/Masifa	Logun Oke-Ola; Temidire Balogun; Masifa Postal Agency; Oguro/Ife Odan /Masifa Junction; Co-Op. Office, Masifa; Oguro Market Square; Oguro-Isanko Postal Agency
Ejigbo	Ilawo/Isoko/Isundunrin	Ilawo Town Hall; Oosa/Jagun/Aro; Ilawo Baptist Day School; Mogbelerin Village; Adegeebo/Elewure Village; Isundunrin Bapt. Day School; Isundunrin Comm. Bank; Isundurin Ori-Oke Quarters; Isoko Bapt. Day School; Isoko Market Stall; Isoko Aboruboye
Ejigbo	Inisa I/Aato/Igbon	Aato Postal Agency; Ajogbelede/Aponla; Ijimoba; D. C. School, Igbon I; D. C. School, Igbon II; Bapt. Day School, Ika; Ika Market Square; Inisa I Bapt. Day School
Ejigbo	Inisa II/Afaake/Ayegunle	Iwata Market Square; Balogun Olukotun Quarters Iwata; Afaake Town Hall; Ayegunle Kugbola; Ibogunde; Inisa II; Songbe Market Square; Aba Merin; Ado-Ori-Oke; Molosanowo Village; Olorin; Osuntedo; Idi-Igba
Ife Central	Ilare I	Oluorogbo High School; Idi Obi; Ope Olu-Hospital; Mooremi High School; O. A. U. Staff Quarters; Sijuwade Nurs/Pry. School; Frontage Adeyera House; Igboya (O/S Opp. Catholic Church); Igboya (O/S Opp. Seventh-Day Church); Pearl Nur./Pry. School, Olonade; Open Space Adesina Street; Open Space Adedeji Street; Olubuse Market, Igboya; Open Space Mbabimbayo; Oranmiyan Grammar School; Open Space Mokola
Ife Central	Ilare II	Ajegunle Opp. Olowo Idi-Agbon I; Ajegunle Opp. Olowo Idi-Agbon II; Open Space Irebami Line I; Open Space Irebami Line I (A); Open Space Irebami Line II; Open Space Irebami Line III; Open Space Irebami Line IV; L.A. Pry. School, Fajuyi; Ajegunle Line II (Back Of Arewa House); Ajegunle Line II; Open Space Orafidodo; Open Space Ibukunolu Line I; Open Space C.A.C Oke Itunu; Open Space Irebami Line V; Back Of Ajegunle Bus Stop (Arubiewe); Open Space Ibunkunolu Line II
Ife Central	Ilare III	Health Centre, Olomowewe; Akodi Wakesan; Akodi Ooni Ilare I; Akodi Ooni Ilare II; Akodi Akeran; Akodi Gbuede; Akodi Olubuse; Akodi Obadio; Akodi Oga; Eranyiba Court; Akodi Wasin; General Post Office
Ife Central	Ilare IV	St. John Pry. School, Ilare; Central Pry. School, Ilare; Akodi Ajaba; Open Space Oluere; Akodi Olodo I; Akodi Olodo II; Akodi Agesinyowa; Ile Cannani (Under Breadfruit) Tree; Akodi Ayedun; A. U. I Pry. School, Olaolu; Akodi Adejokun; Methodist Pry. School; Baptist Pry. School, College Road; Open Space Olumogbe I; Open Space Olumogbe II; Akodi Apejiogo; Open Space, Igbo Agbo
Ife Central	Iremo/Ajebandele	New Garage (Open Space Motor Park); Slaughters Slab (Ede Road); Open Space Adesanmi B/Stop; Fajuyi Hall O. A. U; Awolowo Hall; O. A. U. Quarters, 1st Bus Stop; O. A. U. Quarters, 2nd Bus Stop; Blessing Nursery And Pry. School, Faola Layout; Obagbile (O. A. U Farm); L.A. Pry. School, Ajebamidele; L.A. Pry. School, Elefon; Open Space Falaju Street, Ede-Road; Post Graduate Hall, O. A. U; Sports Centre, O. A. U
Ife Central	Iremo II (Eleyele)	Open Space Mayfair Junction; L.A. Pry. School, Eleyele; Fadehan Nur/Pry. School, Eleyele; Open Space Lati Eluyera; Living Hope Hospital; Frontage Seramo Guest House; Frontage Nitel; Ife Girls High School; St. Mathew Nursery/Pry. School, Eleyele; Open Space Mayowa Street; Open Space Akintibu Street; Bishop's Court Parakin Obalufe; Open Space Ebenezer Street; Omo/Olu Nur/Pry. School, Akindoyin; Town Planning Office; Open Space Opp. Prof. Abiri's House
Ife Central	Iremo III	Akodi Obalaye Ajupepe; Akodi Fayimoka; Recreation Club; Frontage Of Alimi's House; St. Murumba Pry. Schol; Olubuse Market (Iso Obi); Akodi Obalufon I; Akodi Obalufon II; Open Space Ayibiowu; St. Peter's Pry. School, Iremo; Akodi Jaran Arinloye; Open Space Ilara; Akodi Moku; Open Space London Street; Akodi Latale; Akodi Awolude; L. G. Office Oja Tuntun
Ife Central	Iremo IV	Akodi Ladapo; Akodi Akui; Akodi Ake; Akodi Lukoun; Akodi Jagbere; Akodi Aje; Open Space Gbelenkan St.; Akodi Ijaroa; Frontage - Amoo's House; Akodi Lanase; Akodi Akile
Ife Central	Iremo V	Akodi Atiki; Akodi Asarogun; Akodi Jaojo; Akodi Aga; Akodi Abewela; Akodi Lujumo 1; Akodi Lujumo II; C.A.C Pry. School, Ojoyin; St. Michael Pry. School, Ogbon-Agbara; Akodi Obalejugbe; Open Space Garage - Isale; High Court Aderemi Road; Akodi Waluberin; Akodi Babasigidi; Akodi Faloyin; Akodi Darikuduru; Open Space Ojikutu's House; Open Space, Isale Agbara
Ife Central	Akarabata	Akarabata Line I; Akarabata Line II; Akarabata Line III; Frontage Of L. I. E.'s Office; Urban Day Grammar School; Local Govt. Mini Market; Oranmiyan Shopping Complex; Frontage Of Isawumi; Frontage Of Lenards; Frontage Of Little By Little; Frontage Of Water Corporation; S. D. A. Pry. School
Ife Central	Moore Ojaja	Ife City Hall Area I; Agbedegbede Street; Moore Street; Agbede Area; A.U.D Pry. School, Ido-Osun Street; After Police Station; Opp. Papa Owoyomi, Ojaja Line I; Fajuyi Road; Beside Total Filling Station; Ifedapo Street; Ikoyi Quarters; Ife City Area II; Opa Area; Alakowe; Ere-Ola; King Solomon Church; Iddo Street; Oduduwa College Road; Moore
Ifedayo	Oyi	L.A. Pry. School I; L.A. Pry. School II; St. Stephen School, Araromi; Asaoye Village; Oyi Adio; St. James Pry. School, Oyi Adunni; Community Pry Sch Ajebamidele; Aba Ikirun
Ifedayo	Isinmi	St. Matthew Isinmi Olotu; Isinmi Enle; Aba Oluode; Aba Oteu; Aba Ogunlolu
Ifedayo	Obaale	Baptist Pry. School I; Baptist Pry. School II; Baptist Pry. School III; Dagbolu Junction I; Dagbolu Junction II; Okolode Area (Yaya); Obala Oke - Ila
Ifedayo	Aworo/Oke-Ila Rural	Oke-Ila Grammar School I; Oke-Ila Grammar School II; Comm. Pry. School Aba Jola; Ejifunmi Market Centre; Ilupeju Pry. School; Dispensary Ayedaade; Ensinkin Village
Ifedayo	Asaoni	Oke Afin Market I; Oke Afin Market II; Oke Yard Ora I; Oke Yard Ora II; Agbugburu Junction; Ora Grammar School; Maternity Centre Ora
Ifedayo	Co-Operative	Oke Alafa Bus Stop I; Oke Alafa Bus Stop II; Wii Market Square Ora I; Wii Market Square Ora II; Wii Market Square Ora III
Ifedayo	Akesin	Oke Agbala K. S. II; Odomija Compound; Ora R. C. M. Pry. School I; Ora R. C. M. Pry. School II; Ora R. C. M. Pry. School III; Ariyo Compound
Ifedayo	Temidire	L.A. Pry. School, Ora I; L.A. Pry School, Ora II; Comm. Pry. School, I Temidire; Comm. Pry. School, II Temidire; St. Stephen Pry. School; Market Centre; Papa Sirajudeen Pry. School
Ife East	Moore	Ife City College I Ilesha Road; Ife City College II Ilesha Road; St. Gabriel Pry. School, I Moore; St. Gabriel Pry. School II Moore; L.A. Pry. School, Ijio, Oja Ife; Oramfe (Opp. General Hospital, 2nd Gate); C.A.C. Pry. School, Obaluru Village; Aba Ompetu, Ompetu Village; C.A.C Pry. School, Moore Area; Opa Area, Ilesha Road
Ife East	Ilode I	Enuwa Square, Palace Frontage; St. John's Pry. School I, Oke Atan; St. John's Pry. School, II Oke Atan; Akodi Osuogun, Oja Ife Area; All Saints Pry. School, Ilode; Akodi Ajamopo, Ajamopo; Akodi Jetao Opp. Enuwa Square; Obawara, Off Ilode
Ife East	Ilode II	Catholic Technical College, Ilode; Local Authority Pry. School, Mosarajo Village; Ilala Obalayan Ilala Obalayan Village; Saga/Elekiri/Obalayan, Elekiri Village; Local Authority Pry. School, Ilala Owena; Ooni Girls' High School, Oke-Ogbo; Local Authority Pry. School Ilode, Ifewara Road
Ife East	Okerewe I	St. Philips Pry. School I, Ayetoro; St. Philips Pry. School II, Ayetoro; C.A.C. Pry. School, I, Iloro; C.A.C Pry. School II, Iloro; A.U.D Grammar School, Iloro; Comm. Pry. School, Abata-Ege; Akodi Adagba, Adegoke Street; Akodi Jaaran, Oke-Soda; Akodi Akinosinla, Akogun Junction; The Apostolic Pry. School, Oke-Soda
Ife East	Okerewe II	Akodi Amodo, Itakogun Area; Akodi Jagudu, Otutu Area; Akodi Olugbodo, Gbodo Street; Akodi Wunmonije, Otutu Area; Akodi Ladelatan Lafogido Street; Akodi Okiti, Gbodo Street; Akodi Agidi I, Ajamopo Street; Akodi Agidi II, Ajamopo Street; P. S. P. Pry. School, Edena Street
Ife East	Okerewe III	St. Peters Gram. School, Ondo Road; Araromi Oke Gbala, Araromi Okegbala; Akodi Lowa Omisore, Ogbon-Oya; Coker Mem. Pry. School, Erefe Village; Agidi Arubidi, Oke Ayetoro Junction; St. Philips Gra School, I, Arubidi; St. Philips Gra. School, II, Arubidi; Ifelodun Comm. Pry. School, Ondo Road; Akodi Akogun, Akogun Compound; Akodi, Gidiogbo, Gidiogbo Compound
Ife East	Yekemi	Comm. School I, Yekemi Village; Comm. School II, Yekemi Village; Ayekoka Maternity Centre, Ayekoka; St. John's Pry. School, Wanikin/Eleja; Comm. Pry. School, Abata-Egba; Iyan Foworogi Pry. Schol, Iyan Foworogi; Idu/Elesin Petesi/Orisunbare, Idu Elesin Village; St. Philip's Pry. School, Aganran
Ife East	Modakeke I	R. C. M. Iraye; L.A. Pry. School, Amuda Oba; T. A. C. Pry. Schol, Egbedore; Comm. Grammar School, Aje Road; Boosa Market, Boosa Market; Salem Bap. Pry. School, Iraye Area; St. Stephen 'C' Pry. School, Adeowo; Kajola Area, Kajola
Ife East	Modakeke II	Akeredolu Area Ile Epo; Akodi Onile Aran; St. Stephen 'B' Famia Road; Holy Saviour's Pry. School, Oke Tubu; St. Stephen 'A' Pry. School, Itasin Area; Olorunsogo, Olorunsogo Area; Customary Court, Opp. Ogunsua's Palace; Baptist Pry. School, Itamerin; Pry. Health Centre I, Oke Bode; Pry. Health Centre, II, Oke Bode
Ife East	Modakeke III	Ogunsua Gram. School, Esuyare; Akodi Ijedu I, Ijedu Area; Akodi Ijedu II, Ijedu Area; C.A.C Pry. School, Ondo Road; Comm. Pry School, Oke-Ola I; Akodi Bada Akarabata; Apostolic Pry. School, Jagunadado; Olukade Alapata; Cooperative Building, Ajigbona; Comm Pry Sch, Oke-Ola II
Ife North	Asipa/Akinlalu	St. John's School I, Asipa; St. John's School II, Asipa; Post Office, Asipa; Town Hall, Asipa; Ogundijo Village; Town Hall Akinlalu; St. Stephen's School, Akinlalu; L.A. School, Eyentanle
Ife North	Edunabon I	Council Hall, Edunabon; Baptist Pry. School, Edunabon; L.A. School, Edunabon; R. C. M. School, Edunabon; Elemu/Amoloye; Tonkere Orile/Idi Ogbagba; Oloba/Balogun; Abojo Village; C.A.C. School, Edunabon I; C.A.C School, Edunabon II
Ife North	Edunabon II	St. Peter's School, Edunabon; Oju-Oja Edunabon I; Oju-Oja Edunabon II; Osasa's Compound Edunabon I; Osasa's Compound Edunabon II; Ejemu Village; Moroyin/Ogbigbi; Elerin I, II & III; Apesikiti/Alawiye; Emmanuel C & S Pry. School, Edunabon; Ogbirigbiri Village
Ife North	Famia	St. Martin's School, Egbeda; Okun-Omoni Grammar School, Okuu; St. Paul's Pry. School, Famia; St. Phillip's School, Idi-Iroko; Asabi Village; Apostolic School, Baale-Sango; Onisoro Village
Ife North	Yakoyo	St. John's School, Yakoyo; L.A. School, Oke-Osin; Maternity Centre, Yakoyo; Post Office Yakoyo/St. John's School, Ayedaade; St. John's School, Ayedaade; Iya Olomo Oke-Osin; Alani Akinrinade Open Space
Ife North	Ipetumodu I	Town Hall, Ipetumodu; Court Hall, Ipetumodu I; Court Hall, Ipetumodu II; Isale Ola/Dele; St. Augustine School, Ipetumodu; The Apostolic School, Ipetumodu; Christ School, II, Ipetumodu; Baptist Pry. School, Ipetumodu; Isale Ola/Olose; Iwaro Village; C.A.C School, Ipetumodu; Agbanda Village; Christ School, Ipetumodu
Ife North	Ipetumodu II	Maternity Centre, Ipetumodu; C.A.C. School, Baakun/ Ipetumodu; L.A. School, Orugun, Ipetumodu; Ayetoro Area, Ipetumodu; St. John's School, Oke-Ola; A.U.D. School, Koso; Isale Aaje, Ipetumodu; Origbo Comm. Unity High School, Ipetumodu; Amosun Village; Amulie, Ipetumodu; Odo-Oba, Ipetumodu; Abebi Junction, Ipetumodu`
Ife North	Moro	Dispensary Centre, Moro; Market Centre, Moro; Coperative Moro; Eleweran Village; Ifelodun Market Centre; C.A.C School, Moro; Odu Hall, Moro; Ayepe Hall, Moro; L.A. School, Olukotun
Ife North	Oyere I	St. Raphael's School, Toro; Apostolic's School, Idi-Ita; L.A. School, Ori-Okuta; Oyoo Adukesi; St. Paul's School, Molodo; R. C. M. School, Onibambu
Ife North	Oyere - II	L.A. School, Amukegun; Alapata Village; L.A. School, Kilibi; Apamu Ibadan; L.A. School, Atowo; Christ Church School, Aborisaade I; Christ Church School, Aborisaade II
Ife South	Ikija I	Ikija, Ifetedo; Ifetedo High School I, Ifetedo; Ifetedo High School II, Ifetedo; Ideta, Ifetedo; Akodi Ajibike Ifetedo; Oke-Eso I Ifetedo; Oke-Eso II, Ifetedo; Oniwinde Ifetedo; Abatuntun; Akodi Famoroti Ifetedo; Aba Bada
Ife South	Ikija II	Baba Akodi, Ifetedo; C.A.C. Pry. School I, Ifetedo; C.A.C. Pry. School II, Ifetedo; Community Pry. School, Mosafejo I; Community Pry. School, Mosafejo II; St. Peter's Pry. School, Akeju; Community High School, Oniperegun; Ominla Village; Otutu, Ifetedo; Akodi Ologbenla, Ifetedo; Ilare Compound
Ife South	Aare	A.U.D. School, Ifetedo; Towobaje Market; Court Hall Ifetedo I; Court Hall Ifetedo II; Idi-Odan Oja Oba; Ayetoro Ifetedo; Coop Store Area Owode Village; A.U.D. Pry. School, Idi-Ogan Village; Baptist Pry. School, Akintola; St. Stephen's School, Gbongbonkan Osi; Town Hall, Ifetedo; Aba Ose, Arowolo
Ife South	Mefoworade	Community Centre, Mefoworade; St. John's School, Mefoworade; Oke-Ogbomoso Mefoworade; A. U. I. School, Oke-Ila I; A. U. I School, Oke-Ila II; Omifunfun Village I; Omifunfun Village II; Dispensary Onigbodogi; Baptist Day School, Agbaje; St. Henry School, Area IV; St. Stephen School, Ajebandele; Baptist Day School, Bolorunduro; Pry School, Idi-Ogun
Ife South	Oke Owena	Alabameta Pry. School; Poika Onikoko Village; L.A. Schoolfadaka; L.A. School, Yinmi I; L.A. School, Yinmi II; Konta Village; Poika Adewumi; Holy Cross Pry. School; St. Theresa's Pry. School Odesan; Poika Ogunleye
Ife South	Olode	Court Hall Olode; United Pry. School, Olode; Motor Park, Olode; St. Mathew School, Idera; A.U.D. Pry. School, Olode I; A.U.D. Pry. School, Olode II; Aba Nathaniel, Olode; Aye Odemuyiwa, Olode; Agbonbiti Olode; United L.A. School, Labata; Primary School, Onipetesi; Adereti Village
Ife South	Kere	L.A. Pry. Sch. Araromi Oke-Odo I; L.A. Pry. Sch. Araromi Oke-Odo II; Olomu Oja; L.A. School Adereti; St. Agnes Pry. School, Iponrin; Camp Oja; L.A. School, Olorunda I; L.A. School, Olorunda II; Kere Orisunbare; Pry School, Aba Ogunleye
Ife South	Abiri Ogudu	Coop. Store Area, Abiri Village; Pry. School, Aba Oba; St. Michael Pry School, Aba Iwo; Gbafari Village; Coop. Store Area, Toba; Coop. Store Area, Itamerin; L.A. School, Oba Lara; Coop. Store Ogogo Arowo Komo; St. John Pry. School, Ogudu I; St. John Pry School, Ogudu II
Ife South	Aye	Aderemi Memorial College I; Aderemi Memorial College II; Ogbagba Village; Aba Iresi I; Aba Iresi II; Pry School, Olowokere; Baptist Day School, Idi-Ogun; Idi Ako Village; Atere Pry. School; St. Thomas Pry. School, Ajebandele; Amodo Pry School, Amodo Village
Ila	Ejigbo I	Baptist Pry. School, Oke Ejigbo I; Baptist Pry. School, Oke Ejigbo II; Temidire; Ojude Obaala, Oke Ejigbo I; Ojude Obaala, Oke Ejigbo II; Post Office; Igbonnibi Town Hall I; Igbonnibi Town Hall II; Ojude Orangun I; Ojude Orangun II; Ita Sapon; Araromi I; Araromi II; Baba Kerere Junction; Igbonnibi High School; Gaa Fulani
Ila	Ejigbo II	Ojude Enare; Cooperative Store I; Cooperative Store II; Olootu; Dispensary; Ojude Obajoko; Ojude Obaale; Awugbo; Ajioni
Ila	Ejigbo III	Adekunle Junction; St. Michael Pry. School; Ajaba Junction; Ajaba Garage; Onifade Junction; New Garage; Ogunlade Junction; Iyana Iresi
Ila	Isedo I	Oloponda I; Oloponda II; Oloponda III (Alakoyi/Secretariat Road); Olojagbele I; Olojagbele II; Loowa I; Loowa II; Alakooyi I; Alakooyi II; Maternity Centre, Onigbon; Ita Atewogbade I; Ita Atewogbade II; Secretariat
Ila	Isedo II	Olukori Junction I; Olukori Junction II; St. Matthew Pry. School, I; St. Matthew Pry. School, II; St. Matthew Pry. School III; Ojude Opposin I, Beside Idi Odu Odosin; Ojude Opposin II Akodi Obalumo O/S In Odosin; Ojude Abalagemo; St. Julius Pry. School I; St. Julius Pry. School II
Ila	Iperin	Amowoyagi; Ojude Ala I; Ojude Ala II; Elemogun I; Elemogun II; Ejemu I; Ejemu II; Ogunlolu; Saka Jangi I; Saka Jangi II; A.U.D. Pry. School, Ora Road; Kolawole Junction; Mechanic Workshop; Idi Agbon; Adeniji; Omotosho Village Bus Stop
Ila	Eyindi	Ile Elemona I; Ile Elemona II; Ojude Alasan I; Ojude Alasan II; Eyindi Iyalode I; Eyindi Iyalode II; Isale Afa I; Isale Afa II
Ila	Oke Ola	No Sorrow House, Oke Ola; Oke Ola (Opp. C & S Church); Sweet Mother House Frontage; Durotolu Junction; A.U.D. Pry School, Oke Ola I; A.U.D. Pry. School, Oke Ola II; A.U.D. Pry. School, Oke Ola III; Agbamu Junction; L.A. Pry. School, Aloyin I; L.A. Pry. School, Aloyin II; Aloyin (Opp. General Hospital, Ila); Maternity Centre, Oko Awo
Ila	Oke Ede	Afijio I; Afijio II; Edigbon (Ijimogodo Junction, Oke Ede); Edigbon ( Beside Nepa Transformer); Edigbon (Opp. Nepa Transforemr); Oore I; Oore II; Obanihare I; Obanihare II; Obajisun; S. D. A Pry. School, Oke Ede I; S. D. A. Pry. School, Oke Ede II
Ila	Eyindi/Iperin	Ojude Aworo I; Ojude Aworoii; Ojude Alapinni I; Ojude Alapinni II; Ojude Alapinni III; Ojude Alaa; Odoode (Opp. Odoode Mosque); Odoode (Jangi Road); Odoode (Idi Langbodo) I; Odoode (Idi Lamgbodo) II
Ila	Ajaba/Edemosi/Aba Orangun	Idi Ogbagbara Village; Aworookun Village; Alagbede Village; Cooperative Store, Ajaba; Ajaba Market Square I; Ajaba Market Square II; Baptist Primary School, Aba Orangun; Ejigbo Orangun Market Square; L.A. Pry. School, Edemosi; Edemosi Market Square
Ilesa East	Okesa	Frontage Of Obanla's Palace I; Frontage Of Obanla's Palace II; Beside C. S. S. Bookshop; Infront Of Saba/Old Singer I; In Front Of Saba/Old Singer II; Ilesha Grammar School Premises I; Ilesha Grammar School Premises II; C.A.C. School I; C.A.C School II
Ilesa East	Imo	Kajola Junction I; Kajola Junction II; Local Government Dispensary Premises; L.A. Pry. School Premises; In Front Of Ossadep; Fadahunsi Avenue; Old Water Works; Ibl Second Gate; Imo Garage Area I; Imo Garage Area II
Ilesa East	Ifosan/Oke-Eso	Baptist Pry. School I; Baptist Pry. School II; Apostolic Pry. School I; Apostolic Pry. School II; N.U.D Pry. School I; N.U.D. Pry. School II; C & S Pry. School I; C & S Pry. Sch. II
Ilesa East	Itisin/Ogudu	Oye Sign & Spraying Works Area; Frontage Dayo Battery Shop; Ogudu/Ifosan Junction; Mechanic Works Opp. Methodist Mission; Frontage Adex Mechanic Shop; Lemon Compound
Ilesa East	Ijamo	Ijamo Market Area I; Ijamo Market Area II; Ijamo Lane Area; Frontage Sanni Electronic Shop Ijamo; Frontage Olaiya Weaving Industry; Frontage Mechanic Workshop Ijoku Junction
Ilesa East	Upper & Lower Ijoka	Lejoka Palace Area; Ogbon Okun Junction; Ijoka Irewole Ct & Cs Office; Chief Lejoka Palace Area; Methodist Pry. School; Federal Technical College, Capaa I; Federal Technical College, Capaa II; Frontage Of Mechanic Workshop, Opp. Coca Coca
Ilesa East	Iloro/Roye	St. John Pry. School 'A'; Loriomo Odundun; Idio Area; Loriomo Anaye; Durojaye Maternity; Iroye Street I; Iroye Street II; Idifi Open Space
Ilesa East	Isare	Coop. Building Junction; Customary Court Ogburu; R. C. M Oke Padi; Lisare's Palace Area I; Loriomo Isare I; Loriomo Isare II; Elegant D. C. Ogbon Arogbo; Apostolic Central School I; Apostolic Central School II
Ilesa East	Ilerin	Orire Ogedengbe Pry. School; Odi Olowo Area; Demonstration Pry. School, Irojo; Frontage Chief Arojo's House; Sabo Market Area; Ijesa Muslim Grammar School I; Ijesa Muslim Grammar School II; Ilerin Road; Oke Alafia Junction; L.A. Pry. School
Ilesa East	Bolorunduro	Frontage Cocoa Store Ijofi; Isona Church Area; Orogba Area; Apostolic Pry. School, Oke-Iro I; Apostolic Pry. School, Oke Iro II; Oro Ajimoko Pry. School I; Oro Ajimoko Pry. School II; United Anglican Pry. School I; United Anglican Pry. School II; St. Theresa Pry. School I; St. Theresa Pry. School II; Olomilagbala Area; Hope Grammar School
Ilesa East	Biladu	Adenle Junction; Loriomo Biladu Area; Works Yard, L. G I; Works Yard, L. G II; Akin Obi Way Oke-Opo; L.A. Pry. School, Oke-Opo; Ido Ijesa I; Ido Ijesa II
Ilesa West	Itakogun/Upper Egbe-Idi	Idiroko/Itakogun; Ibosinni Near Mech. Workshop; Frontage Of Lokinran; Frontage Of Babajide I; Frontage Of Babajide II; Opposite Egbe-Idi Mosque; Igbogi Junction Orinkinran; Idi Iroko/Itakogun
Ilesa West	Lower Egbe-Idi	Frontage Of Eminiwa; Ireti Ayo Open Space; Mech. Workshop Near Gen. Filling Station; Open Space Ijesa Sport Club; Idi Ayan Area I; Idi Ayan Area II; Open Space In Front Of Coca-Cola Dept.; Egbe Idi Junction
Ilesa West	Upper/Lower Igbogi	Olola Hall; Upper Igbogi (Aseda's House Area); Space Near Amuru House; Oke Ola Open Space; Space Near Risin Kin's House; Idi Gbanja Area; Igbogi Hall I; Igbogi Hall Area I; Open Space Near Mosque
Ilesa West	Omofe/Idasa	Frontage Of Bamura's House; Holy Trinity 'A' School Omofe I; Holy Trinity 'A' School, Omofe II; Holy Trinity 'B' School, Omofe III; Holy Trinity 'B' School, Omofe IV; Mercy Clinic; Ita Ofa Junction; Sorundi's House Area I; Sorundi's House Area II
Ilesa West	Isokun	Temidire Pry. School, Frontage; Isokun Maternity Area; Salvation Army Pry. School; Oke Omiru Mechanic Workshop; George Burton College I; George Burton College II; L.A. Pry School, Isokun I; L.A. Pry. School, Isokun II; African Church Grammar School, Area; Faith Foundation N & P School I; Faith Foundation N & P School II; Zumuratul Pry. School, Area
Ilesa West	Ikoyi / Ikoti Araromi	African Jubilee Pry. School, Ikoyi; Open Space Around Alakata's House; Space Near Odole's House I; Space Near Odole's House II; O Line Ita Ofa Junction I; O Line Ita Ofa Junction II; P Line Junction Enu Odi Ikoyi; Beside Jehoval Nisi African Pry. School I; Beside Jehoval Nisi African Pry. School II
Ilesa West	Ilaje	Frontage Of Nud. Pry. School, Moroko Road; Space Near End Of Tarred Road, Isale Gen.; Old School Of Health Technology; Ogedengbe Comm. High School; Open Space Alaje's House; Loriomo Ilaje (Meth. School Area); Imadin Junction; St. Peter's Frontage; Meth. Pry. School, Loriomo Ilaje; Imadin Area Near Akinniyi's House
Ilesa West	Isida/Adeti	African Pry. Schol, Aragan; L.A. Dispensary Adeti I; L.A. Dispensary Adeti II; Adeti/Esira Strean Bank Area; Space Around Esira's Chieftancy House; Isida Mechanic Workshop; Odo Agbede; Opposite Baseeni's House ( Open Space)
Ilesa West	Ereja	Town Hall; Cocoa Store Itabalogun; Post Office; Tipper Owners; Space Around Market Place; Space Beside Banuso; Town Planning Area; Ogboni's Area I; Ogboni's Area II; Open Space Opp. Mosque
Ilesa West	Ayeso	Open Space Around Loro's House; Methodist Primary School, Oke- Ese I; Methodist Primary School, Oke- Ese II; L.A School Ogbon Egbe; Oke Iyin Open Space; Space Near Police Barrack I; Space Near Police Barrack II; Space Near Police Barrack III; Open Space Oke Iyin Lane; St. James Primary School, Oke - Iyin
Irewole	Ikire 'A'	St. John's Pry. School, Ayedade, Ikire I; St. John's Pry. School, Ayedade Ikire II; Ori Eru Open Space, Ori Eru Ikire I; Ori Eru, Open Space, Ori Eru Ikire II; Moringbere Hall, Open Space; Atoba Oja Open Space; Ejemu Open Space, Ori Eru, Ikire I; Ejemu Open Space, Ori-Eru, Ikire II; Oke Awo Junction, Ikire; Moosa Open Space, Ikire; Jifarolo Open Space, Ikire
Irewole	Ikire 'B'	Ajigbo Open Space, Abata Stream; Old Motor Garage, Market Square; Olukunle Oja Open Space, Opeyemi Area; Olukunle Oke Odo Open Space, Abata Stream; Palace Open Space, Ibwa Ikire; Atoba Oke Odo Open Space, Oke Odo Area; Agbongbon Open Space, Abata Stream Area
Irewole	Ikire 'C'	Ajilo Open Space, Itaakun, Ikire I; Ajilo Open Space, Itaakun, Ikire II; Falabi Open Space, Odeadie, Ikire; Sagba Open Spade, Odeadie, Ikire; Odeagbon, Open Space, Odeagbon, Ikire; Odeadie, Open Space, Odeadie, Ikire; Onilu Popo Open Space, Popo, Ikire; Asiyin Popo Open Space, Popo, Ikire; Jadubi Open Space, Popo, Ikire
Irewole	Ikire 'D'	Kujogbo Open Space, Okeola, Ikire; Oluwata Open Space, Okeola, Ikire I; Oluwata Open Space, Okeola, Ikire II; Oluofinrin Market, Oluofinrin, Ikire I; Oluofinrin Market, Oluofinrin, Ikire II; Lesi Open Space, Etaakun, Ikire; Sagba Open Space, Oluofinrin, Ikire; Ilupeju/Oriolori, Ilupeju, Ikire; Onilu Itaakun, Itaakun, Ikire; Fagbure Open Space, Itaakun, Ikire
Irewole	Ikire 'E'	Fatima College, Fatima Area; Adeyinka Old Garage, Lakoosin Area; N.U.D. Sanngo, Sanngo Area; Olufi Junction, Olufi Area; Itaakun Junction, Itaakun Area; Rural Health Centre, Centre Area; St. Augustine Grammar School; Amukuku, Amukuku Area; Molarere Garage Open Space
Irewole	Ikire 'F'	Baase Open Space, Baase, Ikire; Sabo Square, Sabo, Ikire; Carpenter's Hal, Moro, Ikire I; Carpenter's Hall, Moro, Ikire II; Asupoto Open Space, Base, Ikire; Oosafafioye Open Space, Moringbere, Ikire; Baptist Day School, Sango, Ikire I; Baptist Day School, Sango, Ikire II; Odeyinka Old Garage, Lakoosin, Ikire; Alaha Open Space, Baase, Ikire; Okin Open Space, Popo, Ikire; Magistrate Court, Ayedade, Ikire
Irewole	Ikire 'G'	Parakoyi Open Space, Oke Ada Area; Olota Open Space, Oke Ada Area; A.D.C Pry. School, Oke-Ada Area; Kuseru Open Space, Oke Ada Area; Surajudeen Primary School Owena-Ijesa(Market Square, Owena; Oyepo Open Space, Oke Ada Area; C. H. S. Oke-Ada, Oke Ada Area; Oniledu Open Space, Oke Ada Area
Irewole	Ikire 'H'	Ologungun Open Space, Ologungun Area; Old Nepa Office, Ogunyemi Area; Jolaiya Junction, Jolaiya Area; Odegade Open Space, Okeodo Area; Eleye Open Space, Okeodo Area; Baralola Open Space, Okeodo Area; Islamihal Pry. School, Ogunyemi Area; Ikudoro Open Space, Itamerin Junction
Irewole	Ikire 'I'	New Garage Open Space, Sunmoye Area; Olorisa Oko Square, Olorisa Oko Area; A.U.D. School, Atile Area; Naira And Kobo Open Space, Naira & Kobo Area; Onikinnihun Open Space, Onikinihun Area; Obada Court, Obada Court; Temidire Open Space, Temidire Area; Ologbin, Itamerin Area; S. S. Peter And Paul, Sunmoye Pry. School Area
Irewole	Ikire 'J'	Oloowa Village, Oloowa Village; Oosa Village, Oosa Village; A.U.D. School, Agbora, Agbora Village; Wasinmi Market, Wasinmi Village; St. John's Pry. School, Fidiwo, Fidiwo Village; Elere Village, Elere Village; Balogun Village, Balogun Village I; Balogun Village, Balogun Village II; C. H. S School Wasinmi, Wasinmi Village; Majeroku Village, Majeroku Village; Ajilo Nla Village Ajilo Village; Funmilayo Village Open Space, Funmilayo Village; Baptist Day School, Alaye, Alaye Village
Irewole	Ikire 'K'	Irewole Maternity, Ebunla Village; Molarere Village, Open Space, Molarere Village; A.D.C School, Dagbolu Village I; A.D.C School, Oluseke Village II; A.D.C School, Oluseke Village III; Olobe Village Open Space, Olobe Village; Akinropo Village, Open Space, Akinropo Village; St. James Pry. School, Akan Agbongbon Village; A.D.C Pry. School, Jagun Village; Aajo Village Open Space, Aajo Village; Odokoto Village, Open Space, Odokoto Village; Ayetoro Village, Open Space, Ayetoro Village; Odeyinka Baptist Day School, Odeyinka Village I; Odeyinka Baptist Day School, Odeyinka Village II; Bamidele Village Open Space, Bamidele Village; Arinkinkin Village, Arinkinkin; Molausa Village, Molausa; Baptist Day School, Onikan Village; Itamerin Village, Itamerin; Efunle Alaguntan Pry. School, Efunle Alaguntan; Baptist Pry. Schol, Olokoko Village; Ayedaade Oba Village, Ayedaade Oba; A.U.D. Odesilo Village, Odesilo
Isokan	Olukoyi (Oja-Osun)	Library; Alapinni; Olukoyi-Oja Osun; Olode Orioke; A U D Ikoyi
Isokan	Osa Ikoyi (Oloke)	St. David's Pry. School, Ikoyi; Ikoyi Town Hall; Maternity Centre; Timi Compound; Oloke Quarters; Oba Onile Owo
Isokan	Asalu Ikoyi	C.A.C Pry. School, Ikoyi; St. Rita's N/P. Schol, Ikoyi; St. Michael Pry. School, Asejire; Dispensary; Alekuso Village; St. Anthony Grammar School
Isokan	Oranran Ward	R. C. M Pry. School, Mopa; St. Paul's Pry. School, Abidemi; A.D.C Pry. School, Mowo-Oba; St. Mary's Pry. School, Oranran I; St. Mary's Primary School, Oranran II; Oran Olumelo; Alako Village
Isokan	Idogun Ward	Aworin Sadiku Adc Pry Sch; A.U.D Pry. School, Olokuta; Holy Trinity, Lasegba; Iwari Adefi, Pry. Schol; Eruku Village
Isokan	Alapomu I (Odo-Osun)	Baptist Pry. School, Oke Olosi; St. Barnabas Pry. School; Lagbaja New Post Office; Apomu Town Hall I; Apomu Town Hall II; Health Office, Apomu
Isokan	Alapomu II	Papanla; Mopa Aayedun; Omo Osu; Oosa Faru; Oke Jago
Isokan	Asalu (Mogimogi)	Quarry Area I; Quarry Area II; Awotedo; African Primary School; Bank Area Commerce And Credit; A.D.C Pry. School, Apomu; Orita Agunla; Ayodele Area
Isokan	Oosa Adifa	Eruku Hall I; Eruku Hall II; Oosa Ekanade; Ejemu Hall; Aro Oladele; Bodude Area
Isokan	Awala I	Elebenla; Awala Market; St. Michael Pry. Schol, Agbaogun`; A.D.C Pry. School, Onikooko; African Pry. School, Okodowo; Market Square, Egbeda Oko; D. C. School, Orija Marun
Isokan	Awala II	St. Jude's Pry. School, Ayepe; St. Barnabas Pry. School, Abatisa; Oke Oko Market; A.D.C Pry. School, Oja -Oosa; Faru Alapomu Village; Akumora
Iwo	Isale Oba I	A.U.D. Pry. School, Akinfenwa I; A.U.D. Pry. School, Akinfenwa II; A.U.D. Pry. School, Akinfenwa III; A.U.D. Pry. School, Akinfenwa IV; Oloola I; Oloola II; Ode Awudere Junction
Iwo	Isale Oba II	Customary Court Ode Oba I; Customary Court, Ode - Oba II; Customary Court Ode Oba III; Customary Court Ode Oba IV; Petugbele I; Petugbele II; Orangun; Idi Oke I; Idi-Oke II
Iwo	Isale Oba III	Baptist Pry. School, Oke-Odo I; Baptist Pry. School, Oke-Odo II; D. C. Pry. School, Ajangbala I; D. C Pry. School, Ajangbala II; State Hospital First Gate; Hospital Road, Kuti Junction; Hospital Road Junction; Panada; Paaku; Adediti
Iwo	Isale Oba IV	D. C. Pry. School, Oke-Ola I; D. C Pry. School, Oke-Ola II; St. Michael Pry. School, Obatedo I; St. Michael Pry. School, Obatedo II; Opababa; Yafoye St Augustine Pry Sch; Olunle
Iwo	Molete I	Ajigbaagun I; Ajigbaagun II; Ajigbaagun III; Ajigbaagun IV; Ajadi I; Ajadi II; Moseru; Oloye; Opp St. Stephen's Ang. Pry. School, Onilete
Iwo	Molete II	Osogbo Junction Old Iwo-Osogbo Road, Iwo; Aroworeki; Aladoorun; Afiku Olowe; Water Works Road, Olu Yori; Opposite Water Works, First Gate; Elewe; Motokese
Iwo	Molete III	A.U.D Pry. School, Agbogbo; Near Comm. Bank Odoori; Near Lawyer Atanda's Area; Araromi Market; Sabo/Araromi Market; Methodist United Grammar School, Araromi; Methodist Pry. School Araromi; Alfa/Tella; Kondo Asati; Elesu; Ago Ogunrinde; Ogede
Iwo	Oke-Adan I	Jagun-Ilu Street I; Jagun Ilu Street II; Old Council 1; Old Council II; Old Council III; Olumodan; Omosan
Iwo	Oke-Adan II	Lakata I; Lakata II; Lakata III; Ponkuku I; Ponkuku II; Idi-Agbede; Idi-Ose; Baase
Iwo	Oke-Adan III	D. C. Pry. School, Jagun Ode I; D. C. Pry. School, Jagun Ode II; Olokobi/Olomi; Baptist Pry. School, Feesu I; Baptist Pry. School, Feesu II; Opposite D. C. Pry. School, Araromi; A.U.D. Pry. School, Araromi I; A.U.D Pry. School, Araromi II; Town Planning Area; Olokoobi; Old Oyo Park Olukotun
Iwo	Gidigbo I	Kajola Market I; Kajola Market II; Opp. Aipate Baptist Church, Aipate; Mosabi; Baptist Pry. School, Aipate I; Baptist Pry. School, Aipate II; Baptist Pry. School, Aipate III
Iwo	Gidigbo II	Ajakoore I; Ajakoore II; Ajakoore III; Post Office Frontage I; Post Office II; Post Office III; Elemo I; Elemo II; Ode-Ere; Motoku; Ode-Ofe I; Ode-Ofe II
Iwo	Gidigbo III	D. C. Pry. School, Oke-Ifa I; D. C. Pry. School, Oke-Ifa II; Dispensary Alaye I; Dispensary Alaye II; Dispensary Alaye III; Baptist High School, Adeke I; Baptist High School, Adeke II; D. C. Pry. School, Laito
Iwo	Oke-Oba I	Baptist Pry. School, Agberire Village I; Baptist Pry. School, Agberire Village II; Islamic Pry. School, Olosi Village; Agbona Village; Awokekere Village; Daodu Village; Ashipa-Oniyangi Village; Baptist Pry. School, Aipate-Nla Village
Iwo	Oke-Oba II	D. C. Pry. School, Elemo Village; D. C. Pry. School, Awusebaale Village; D. C. Pry. School, Oloba Ogundiran Village; D. C. Pry. School, Papa Village; D. C. Pry. School, Ogunajo Village; D. C. Pry. School, Agoro Village; N.U.D Pry. School, Obajoko Village; D. C. Pry. School, Oloba Ijuoba Village; D. C. Pry. School, Idi-Iroko Village I; D. C. Pry. School, Idi-Iroko Village II; D. C. School, Foritaje Village; D. C. School, Anarun Village `; D. C. Pry. School, Oyediran Village; Baptist Pry. School, Ogburo Village I; Baptist Pry. School, Ogburo Village II; N.U.D. Pry. School, Oloola Village; Jato Village; Ayede Village; D. C Pry. School, Idamodu Village; Baptist Pry. School, Papo Village; Joluegan Village
Obokun	Ibokun	Post Office; Ibokun N.U.D. Pry. School; Ibokun St. Peter's Pry. Schol; Ibokun Catholic Pry. School; Ibokun L.A. Grammar School; Ibokun Grammar School; Ibokun Court Hall; Ibokun Dispensary; Ibokun Isale Alfa
Obokun	Ipetu-Ile/Adaowode	Ipetu-Ile Methodist Pry. School I; Ipetu-Ile Methodist Pry. School II; Itiya Pry. School; Olomu L.A. Pry. School; Adaowode Baptist Pry. School; Oja-Titun L.A. Pry. School; Erinja, Erinja Market; Ipetu-Ile Surajudeen Pry. Schol
Obokun	Ilahun/Ikinyinwa	Ilahun Apostolic Pry. School; Ilahun Maternity Centre; Ikinyinwa St. John's Pry. School; Ikinyinwa Town Hall; Gbogidigbo Open Space; Ita-Osun Open Space
Obokun	Ilase/Idominasi	Ilase N.U.D. Pry. School; Ilase Town Hall; Coker Market Square; Iponda L.A. Pry. School; Kiloru Anglican Pry. School; Iregun Methodist Pry. School; Oora L.A. Pry. School; Alafon Open Space; Olorunda L.A. School; Oniyere/Kati L.A. Pry. School; Ayetoro L.A. Pry. School; Idominasi Towh Hall; Ilase Dispensary
Obokun	Eesun/Idooko	Eesun Maternity Centre; Ibala Maternity Centre; Ijana L.A. Pry. School; Ijaregbe Methodist Pry. School; Ido-Oko Grammar School; Ayetoro Open Space
Obokun	Imesi-Ile	Imesi-Ile Ijana Pry. School; Imesi-Ile Town Hall; Imesi-Ile Rural Health Centre; Imesi-Ile Methodist Pry. School; Imesi-Ile St. Paul's School; Imesi-Ile L.A. School I; Imesi-Ile L.A. School II; Imesi-Ile Market Square
Obokun	Esa-Oke	Esa-Oke Town Hall; Esa-Oke St. Joseph's School; Esa-Oke St. Peter's Pry. School; Esa-Oke United School; Esa-Oke African Church Pry. School I; Esa-Oke African Church Pry. School II; Esa-Oke L.A. School I; Esa-Oke L.A. School II; Oja-Oko Open Space; Esa-Oke Grammar School; Esa-Oke Farm Settlement; Oke-Tafia Primary School; Ido Ayegunle Pry. School
Obokun	Otan-Ile	Otan-Ile Imuo Pry. School; Otan-Ile Market Square; Otan-Ile N.U.D. School; Otan-Ile Cooperative Store; Otan-Ile Inigbo Pry. School; Otan-Ile Town Hall
Obokun	Esa - Odo	Esa-Odo Apostolic Pry. School; Esa-Odo Market Square; Esa-Odo St. David's Pry. School; Esa-Odo Maternity Centre; Esa-Odo United Primary School; Oko Kojegbin Open Space
Obokun	Ilare	Ilare Methodist Pry. School; Ilare St. Prancis Pry. School`; Ilare L. I. E. Zonal Office; Ilare Market Square; Ilare Community School; Iketewi Community Pry. School; Ajibamidele Egigun Open Space
Odo-Otin	Oba Ojomu	St. Anthony Pry. School, Okuku; Motor Park, Okuku; Court Hall I, Okuku; Opposite Old National Bank, Okuku; Owode Market Square, Okuku; Oyekunle D. C. Pry. School, Okuku; Open Space Infront Of Alimi's House Ojomu Area, Okuku; Court Hall II, Okuku; In Front Of Pa David Alaran's House, Okuku; 20b Araromi Area, Okuku
Odo-Otin	Baale	Oyinlola D. C. Pry. School, Okuku; Shopping Complex, Ekusa Road, Okuku; St. Michael's Pry. School, Okuku I; St. Michael's Pry. School, Okuku II; In Front Of Adebomi Family House, Okuku; Ekusa Road, Near Idi-Ogun, Okuku; In Front Of Agboluaje's House, Okuku; Opposite Gustus Printers, Okuku I; 9, Oba Olaosebikan Road
Odo-Otin	Igbaye	Post Office, Igbaye; N. Y. S. C Bus Stop, Igbaye; St. Mary's Pry. School, Igbaye; Baptist Pry. School, Igbaye I; N.U.D Pry. School, Igbaye; Alagbede Blacksmith Shop, Igbaye; Imuleke Village, Igbaye
Odo-Otin	Faji/Opete	Maternity Centre Premises, Faaji; St. John's Pry. School, Faaji; N.U.D Pry. School, Opete; Town Hall, Faaji; Semi Ola Area, Opete
Odo-Otin	Ekosin/Iyeku	Baptist Pry. School, Ekosin; Court Hall, Ekosin; St. Paul's Pry. School, Ekosin; Ekosin Grammar School, Ekosin; Town Hall, Iyeku; Alagbede Comp. Beside Baptist Pry. School, Ekosin; Elesin Funfun Community Pry. School, Iyeku
Odo-Otin	Ore/Agbeye	St. Gabriel's Pry. School, Ore; Town Hall, Ore; All Saints Pry. School, Agbeye; Postal Agency, Agbeye; Aganju Village, Near Agbeye; Open Space In Front Of Oyadosu's House, Agbeye
Odo-Otin	Ijabe/Ila Odo	St. Andrew's Pry. School, Ijabe; St. Francis Gabriel Pry. School, Ijabe; Town Hall, Ijabe; N.U.D. Pry. School, Konta; Town Hall, Ila-Odo; In Front Of Postal Agency Ila-Odo; N.U.D. Pry. School, Alapata
Odo-Otin	Okua/Ekusa	Oja-Oba Market Square, Okua; Towh Hall, Okua; St. Thomas Pry. School I, Ekusa; Postal Agency, Ekusa; St. Thomas Pry. School II, Ekusa; St. Cecilia's Pry. School, Okua
Odo-Otin	Asi/Asaba	St. Andrew ' S Pry. School I, Asaba; Opp. African Church, Asaba`; St. Andrew's Pry. School II, Asaba; Asi Market Square, Asi; Opp. Alasi's Palace, Asi
Odo-Otin	Olunisa	Inisa Grammar School, Inisa; S. D. A. Pry. School I, Inisa; Post Office, Inisa; Adegbite's Compound, Inisa; Akolegbaro's Compound, Inisa; Oba Okunoye Compound, Inisa; Oyedele Compound, Inisa; Railway Station Road Area, Inisa; 24 Ikupelete Area, Inisa
Odo-Otin	Olukotun	St. Peter's Pry. School Area, Inisa I; St. Peter's Pry. School Area, Inisa II; Otepola's Palace Area, Inisa; In Front Of Pa Adebimpe's House, Inisa; Idi-Ita Compound Area, Inisa; Olowuru Compound, Inisa; St. Peter's Pry. School Area III, Inisa
Odo-Otin	Esa Otun Baale Ode	Methodist Pry. School I, Inisa; Baptist Pry. School, Inisa; Oke-Ayan Hall, Inisa; In Front Of Orisa Oko Shrine, Inisa; Ile Paja Oke Compound, Inisa; Opposite Jehovah Witness Hall, Inisa; Methodist Pry. School II, Inisa; 23 Olorede Compound, Inisa
Odo-Otin	Jagun Osi Bale Ode	St. Augustine Pry. School, Inisa; Jalugun/Aibio Square, Inisa; A.U.D. Pry. School, Inisa; Isale Ako Area, Inisa; 2 Agana Area, Inisa; 73a Agbeye Road, Inisa; Arioye Hall, Inisa
Odo-Otin	Oloyan Elemosho / Esa	St. Peter's Pry. School, Oyan; Ajibope Hall, Opp C.A.C Oyan; Oja-Oba Market Square, Oyan; Onile Compound At Open Space, Near Adegoke Family House, Oyan; Alagbede Abutu Compound, Oyan; In Front Of Sure Babber's Shop, Oyan; Elemoso Isale Compound, Oyan; In Front Of Eesa's Palace Square, Oyan; 1, Obitikun / Oluoko Area Oyan
Odo-Otin	Osolo/Oparin/Ola	Owode Market Square, Oyan; N.U.D. Pry. School I, Oyan; Oparin / Aogun Area, Oyan; Aade Compound I, Oyan; Jehovah Witness Pry. School, Oyan; Lakolu's Compound Oyan; St. Paul's Pry. School, Oyan; C.A.C Pry Sch, Oyan; White House, Gbelewale, Oke Odo, Oyan
Ola-Oluwa	Telemu	Town Hall, Telemu I; Town Hall, Telemu II; D. C. Pry. School, Telemu I; D. C. Pry. School, Telemu II; Central Mosque, Telemu; Catholic Hospital, Telemu
Ola-Oluwa	Asamu/Ilemowu	Town Hall, Asamu; Baptist Pry. School, Ilemowu; Fertilizer Depot
Ola-Oluwa	Ogbaagba I	St. James Pry. School, Ogbaagba I; St. James Pry. School, Ogbaagba II; St. James Pry. School, Ogbaagba III; Com. Pry School, Igege
Ola-Oluwa	Ogbaagba II	Comm. Grammar School, Ogbaagba I; Comm. Grammar School, Ogbaagba II; Court Hall, Ogbaagba I; Court Hall, Ogbaagba II
Ola-Oluwa	Ikire Ile/Iwara	Town Hall, Ikire-Ile; St. John's Pry. School, Ikire - Ile I; St. John's Pry. Schol, Ikire-Ile II; D. C. Pry. School, Idi-Iroko; Amere Village, Amere; D. C. Pry. School, Iwara
Ola-Oluwa	Isero/Ikonifin	Town Hall, Ikonifin; Baptist Pry. School, Ikonifin I; Baptist Pry. School, Ikonifin II; Methodist Pry. School, Isero I; Methodist Pry. School, Isero II; Abasade
Ola-Oluwa	Obamoro/Ile Ogo	D. C. Pry. School, Ile - Ogo I; D. C. Pry. School, Ile-Ogo II; Methodist Pry. School, Obamoro I; Methodist Pry. School, Obamoro II; Comm. Pry. School, Odoran
Ola-Oluwa	Bode-Osi	Town Hall, Bode-Osi I; Town Hall, Bode-Osi II; Dispensary Bode-Osi; Anglican Pry. School, Elepo; Olowe Village; Mowara Village
Ola-Oluwa	Ajagba/Iwooke	Ajagba Town; Iwooke Town I; Iwooke Town II; Takoka Village
Ola-Oluwa	Asa Ajagunlase	Methodist Pry. School, Asa I; Methodist Pry. School, Asa II; Baptist Pry. School, Asa; Towh Hall, Ajagunlase I; Town Hall, Ajagunlase II; Idiya Village; Comm. Pry. School, Ogunja
Olorunda	Agowande	School Of Nursing; G. R. A. Osogbo; No. 20, B. C. G. A; 23, Agowande Street; K & S. Pry. School; Oduola Street, Osogbo I; Oduola Street, Osogbo II; Oke Onitea Irepodun; Olatunji Ajayi Street; Around Ebenezer Baptist; Church Street; Osunkunle/Babalola; Back Of Obelawo Plastic Industry
Olorunda	Akogun	Fadairo Open Space; Oriaye Open Space; Aganna Near Mosque; Arikalamu; 8, Arikalamu; Enikanoyun Dispensary; Kolawole Junction; Osefiri Compound; Akogun Maternity; Lasigun / Irerinde
Olorunda	Atelewo	117, Sabo Road, Osogbo; Opposite Fire Brigade; 49, Olugun Street; Olugun (Ebu); Asoje Junction; Near Mubarrak Mosque; Abaolu I. Osogbo; Abaolu II, Osogbo; Akogun No. 1, Onto Street; Onimajesin, Osogbo; 17b, Abija Street
Olorunda	Owoope	157, Sabo Road; 33, Aganna Street; C.A.C Gbonmi; Iwa Lesin; Frontage Of Women/Youth Centre; 4, Irepodun, Osogbo; No. 14, Odo-Eran; Hammed Olayiwola Street; Ifaology I; Ifaology II
Olorunda	Owode I	Cemetery Road; Ile Oluode Atuku; Oluya; Owode; Moja; Obadio Area; Obadio Compound Open Space; Ile Egun; Oluode Market (Ile-Eja)
Olorunda	Owode II	St. James School, A.; St. James School, B; St. James School, C; Oyinbo Olobi; In Front Of Old Museum; A.U.D Sabo; Ile Aganna; 11a, Adenle Lane
Olorunda	Oba Oke	Idi-Ape, Oba Oke; Agbede Awoyale; Olukotun's Compound; Idi-Ose, Oba-Oke; Near St. Peter Pry. School; St. Peter Pry. School; N.U.D. Oba Oke; Idi-Emi; Near Garage Oba Oke; Idi Amu; N.U.D. Oke Ore
Olorunda	Ilie	Popo Ilie I; Popo Ilie II; St. James Pry. School; Temidire Town Hall; Temidire Cocoa Store; Oloriga I; Oloriga II; Postal Agency; Motor Park Ilie; Ilie Town Hall; Aba-Esa
Oriade	Erin-Oke	Post Office, Erin Oke; Dispensary Erin-Oke; A.U.D. Pry. School, Erin-Oke; Alahere Comm.; Irepodun Grammar School, Erin-Oke; Anglican Pry. School, Erin-Oke; Market Square; Aramoja Community
Oriade	Erin-Ijesa	United Pry. School, Erin-Ijesa; Court Hall, Erin-Ijesa; Igbelayewa Comm.; C.A.C. Pry. School, Erin-Ijesa; Irokin Comm.; Afero Comm.; Maternity Centre, Erin-Ijesa; Owode Comm.; Powerline Settlement
Oriade	Ijebu-Jesa	Ijebu-Jesa Grammar School, Ijebu-Jesa; African Pry. School Ijebu-Jesa; St. Mathew Pry. School, 'A' Ijebu-Jesa; St. Mathew Pry. School, 'B' Ijebu-Jesa; The Apostolic Pry. School, Ijebu-Jesa; Post Office, Ijebu-Jesa; Dem. Pry. School, Ijebu-Jesa; Towh Hal, Ijebu-Jesa; Ogunseemi's House; Court Hall, Ijebu-Jesa; Erunkunipe Hall, Ijebu-Jesa; C.A.C. Pry. School, Ijebu-Jesa; Opp. Cath. Church, Ijebu-Jesa; Ajigiteri Hall, Ijebu-Jesa; Opp. P. A. Oluyemi's House
Oriade	Ikeji-Ile	St. Judas Pry. School, Ikeji-Ile; Market Square, Ikeji-Ile; Orisakeji Front, Ikeji-Ile; Araromi/Omiran Community
Oriade	Ira	Ikeji-Ile High School; Ilokun Square, Ira; Orisunmibare Community; Bolorunduro Aje Community
Oriade	Ikeji Arakeji/Owena	Town Hall 'A', Ikeji-Arakeji; St. Peter Pry. School, Ikeji-Arakeji; Front Of Aluko House; Front Of Ede Oyinbo; Surajudeen Pry. School, Owena; The Apostolic School, Owena; Front Of Yakubu House, Oniga; Orita Reserve; Powerline; Imosi Street, Junction, Ikeji-Arakeji; Town Hall 'B', Ikeji Arakeji
Oriade	Apoti /Dagbaja	Onikoko Pry. School; Community Pry. School, Orisunmibare; Rcm Pry. School, Apoti; Comm. Pry. School, Afinbiokin; Health Centre, Eti-Oni Asalu; The Apostolic School, Bolorunduro; Comm. Pry. School, Adedeji Kajola; All Saints Pry. School, Dagbaja; Comm. Pry. School, Alabameta; Ifelodun Pry. School, Fiade Onigba; Araromi Jeje Community; The Apostolic Pry. School, Orisunmibare; Health Centre, Sawe
Oriade	Ipetu Ijesa I	Rcm Pry. School, Ifofin-Ipetu; Afinbiokin Hall, Ipetuijesa I; Afinbiokin Hall, Ipetu-Ijesa II; Igando Market Square Ipetu-Ijesa; A.U.D. Pry. School, Iloro, Ipetu-Ijesa; C.A.C. Pry. School, Anaye, Ipetu-Ijesa; Arodo Community School, Ipetu-Ijesa; Afinbiokin Market Square, Ipetu-Ijesa; Front Of Orisatuyi Stores, Ipetu-Ijesa
Oriade	Ipetu-Ijesa II	Front Of Town Planning Office; Coop. Store, Ipetu-Ijesa; Town Hall, Ipetu-Ijesa I; Tmca Hall, Ipetu-Ijesa II; Elefosan Grammar School, Ipetu-Ijesa; St. Andrew's Pry. School, Ipetu-Ijesa; Itamerin Front Of Oyesa; The Apostolic Pry. School, Ipeju-Ijesa; Cooperative Store, Ipetu-Ijesa
Oriade	Ijeda/ Iloko	U. M. C Pry. School, Ijeda; Town Hall, Ijeda; L.A. Pry. School, Ijeda; Ebenezer Gramm. School, Ijeda; L.A. Pry. School, Iloko; Health Centre, Iloko; Market Square, Iloko; Market Square, (Ois Bus Stop)
Oriade	Erinmo/Iwaraja	St. Peter Pry. School, Erinmo; Town Hall, Erinmo; Phc, Erinmo; Town Hall, Iwaraja I; Obalufon Quarters, Oke-Ana; L.A Pry. School, Ijimo; Market Square, Omo-Ijesa; Araromi Erinmo Community; Oke-Odo/Isogan Community; Town Hall, Iwaraja II
Orolu	Olufon Orolu 'A'	Jamodo Bus Stop; Eesa; Olufon Area I (Open Space); Olufon Area II (Opp. L. G. Library); Olufon Area III(Aaje's Compound); Opadeyi Area; Local Govt. Library I (Akimo Square); Local Govt. Library II (Akimo Square); Sobaloju Ajibodu Area
Orolu	Olufon Orolu 'B'	Aafin Elemu; Olupomu; Obada/Babalu; Ikolaba/Isogari; Asade; St. John's Ang. Pry; Ojamolapa; C.A.C. Pry. School; Ejemu; Alata/Owoka
Orolu	Olufon Orolu 'C'	Obada Market Area I (Bus Stop); Obada Market Area II; Arowomole Area; Surulere Area; Araromi Area; Mosafejo Area 1; Mosafejo Area II; Oroki Area; Asade Area
Orolu	Olufon Orolu 'D'	Local Government Junior Staff Quarters (Ajegunle Reservoir Area; R. C. M Pry. School Area; Youth Centre; Ayetoro Area; Bolorunduro I; Bolorunduro II; Ayegbami Area; Ifon/Erin Gram. School, Road
Orolu	Olufon Orolu 'E'	Ooye Square; Odofin Area; Laaropo Area; Ajibola I; Ajibola II; Ajibike; Lofintola Square; Alabere
Orolu	Olufon Orolu 'F'	Jaleyemi I; Jaleyemi Area II; Dagbolu Area I; Dagbolu Area II; Janta Bus Stop; A.U.D. Pry. School, (Janta Area); Gbamolu; Faleke Area
Orolu	Olufon Orolu 'G'	Elesi Oyegbemi; Elesi Oyewo; Disu Area; Asalu Square; Olurombi; Arenja/Oluode; Basorun; Apiponroro
Orolu	Olufon Orolu 'H'	Kajola Village; Apena Village; Egan Aaje Village; Idi-Iya Village; Idi Iroko/Abepe Kajola; Isangbe/Elegudu
Orolu	Olufon Orolu 'I'	Fagbon Area; Oke-Ola Area; Gbogbo Pry. School; Owode Village; Owode Pry. School II; Osun Eesa Village; Alaiko Village; Arohun Village
Orolu	Olufon Orolu 'J'	Abebi Saw Mill; Ikimo Pry. School; Onigari Area; Elepo Square; Asalu Village Open Space; Ologele Pry. School; Idi Iroko Pry. School; Molufon Primary School; Okiti Pry. School
Osogbo	Ataoja 'A'	6, Winjobi Street; 8, Laro Street; 26, Laro Street; 5, Laro Street; 10, Winjobi; 6 Laro Str; Farm Settlement; Lasinmi Village I; Lasinmi Village II; Ajenisua Village I; Ajenisua Village II; 1. Okanla Street; 11, Okanla Street; 1 Asubiaro Str; 1. Ababu Street; Irepodun Village
Osogbo	Ataoja 'B'	Ifelodun Street; 13, Ababu Street; 19, Ababu Street; 5, Ifelodun Street; 5, Ifelodun Street II; 14, Igbofidudu/Idi-Oro; A.U.D. Isale Osun 1; A.U.D. Pry. Isale-Osun II; A.U.D Isale Osun III; 14, Ifelodun Lane
Osogbo	Ataoja 'C'	19, Timehin Street; 30, Timehin Street; 7, Eesa Olugbede; 13, Atanka Street; 22, Esa-Olugbede; Akinloye Mosque Area; 5, Asubiaro Street; 19, Asubiaro Street; 30, Asubiaro Street; L.A. School, Laro I; L.A. Pry School, Laro II; Apoun Bapt. Pry School, I; Apoun Bapt. Pry. School II; 20, Eesa Olugbede; Girl's High School, Osogbo I; Girl's High School, Osogbo II
Osogbo	Ataoja 'D'	Opp. 7 Up Gbongan Road; Ogo-Oluwa Kitan I; Ogo-Oluwa Kitan II; C.A.C. Araromi; L. G. Dispensary; Union Bapt. School; African Pry School, I; African Pry School, II; Matanmi Market(Behind Transformer); 13, Surulere Street; Isale-Aro (Postal Agency); Kaka Area (Postal Agency); Fagbesa Street; 24, Fagbesa Street; African Church Pry School; 6, Fagbesa Street; 1a, Ekotedo Street; Alhaji Woleola Junction; Alhaji Woleola Junction II; Opposite Old Governor's Office; 20, Kaka Street, Osogbo; Akowonjo Opp. Old Waec Office
Osogbo	Ataoja 'E'	Technical College, Osogbo; Osogbo Grammar School; Oroki Estate; Ogidan Pry School; Salvation Army Pry. School; 5, Lucy Adeoti Street; Odofin Peter Ajibola; 20, Akindeko Street; 20, Akindeko Street (Opp); 8, Iso-Pako I; 8, Iso-Pako II; Tinumola Pry. School; Women Commission; 27, Akindeko Street; Frontage Of Nepa Office; Opp. Technical College; Adewale Street; Alekuwodo Premises; Okin Street Behind Capital Hotel; Railway Station, Oke-Fia
Osogbo	Otun Jagun 'B'	Aro-Oke Compound; Bapt. School, Okanla; Isale Aro Salvation Army I; Isale-Aro Salvation Army II; Isale-Aro Salvation Army III; Isale-Aro Salvation Army IV; Isale-Aro Salvation Army V; Akolu Compound; Oderinlo Compound I; Oderinlo Compound II; St. Benedict School (A); Methodist School, Isale-Aro I; Methodist School, Isale-Aro II; St. Benedict School, 'B'
Osogbo	Alagba	Iya Dudu Compound; 5. Ibokun Road I; 5, Ibokun Road, II; 20, Ibokun Road; 73, Ita Olokan; 53, Ita-Olokan; Igbalaye's House (Front); Lawanson Aresa; 4, Kajola Street; 11, Kajola Street; 10, Iya Dudu Compound; 13, Idi-Ogun Oja Oba; 73, Aresa Street; Igbalaye Comp. Premises; 25, Ita-Olookan Street; 19, Ita-Olokan; 16, Ibokun Road
Osogbo	Are-Ago	15, Ifelodun Lane; 10, Isale Agbara; Oluode Aranyin; John Mackay School; 80, Ita Olookan Street; 8, Oke-Ayepe Street; St. Charles School; Owode Village I; Owode Village II; L.A. Pry School, Oluode Aranyin; 3, Oke Ayepe; Costain Maternity L. G
Osogbo	Jagun 'A'	32, Kajola Street; Public Toilet Area Kajola; 37, Ibokun Road; 24, Olugunna Street`; 43, Ibokun Road; 22, Olugunna Street; 35, Ibokun Road; 60, Ibokun Road I; 60, Ibokun Road II; Opp. 24 Olugunna Street
Osogbo	Jagun B'	24, Okunmebo Street; 16, Ikolaba Street; 19, Kajola Street; Jimmy Radio I; Jimmy Radio II; 14, Areruwe Hotel; Gidado Mosque Area I; Gidado Mosque Area II; 2a, Okunmebo Street II; 4, Ikolaba Street; Aladorin Compound
Osogbo	Baba Kekere	Near Matanmi Mosque; 13, Agboyele Street; Ori Eru Oke Baale; 12, Matanmi Street; 24, Okoki Ifedodun; 15, Oroki Ifelodun; 12, Oke Imole Street; 18, Fagbemi Street; St. Andrew Pry. School; Ojude-Oga; Owolabi Street Obatedo; Front Of Ile Idi-Oke; 5, Fagbemi Street; Opp. 28 Fagbemi; Oke-Imole I; L.A. Gbeja; Oke-Imole II
Osogbo	Otun Jagun 'A'	Opp. Catholic Church; 20, Oke Popo Street; Iyiola Special Bread I; Iyiola Special Bread II; 8, Eesa Binuyo Street; 5, Idi-Omo Street 1; Back Of Grd C2 Court; Near Aronmu Bakery; 5, Idi-Omo Street II; 50, Sabo Road; 15, Oke Popo Street; Eesa Binuyo Street
Osogbo	Eketa	1 Akepe Street; 22, Akepe Street; 12, Kujenyo Street; 10, Kujenyo Street; 44, Olusegun Street; Opp. 31, Olugun Street; 25, Akepe Street; 40, Olugun Street; 20, Olugun Street; 5, Kujenyo Street; 22, Olugun Street; 8, Kujenyo Street; 18, Akepe Street
Osogbo	Otun Balogun 'A'	N.U.D Pry. School, Gbonmi I; N.U.D Pry. School, Gbonmi II; N.U.D. Pry. School, Gbonmi III; L. G. Dispensary Gbonmi; L.A. Pry. School I; L.A. Pry. School II; 5a, Owolabi Street; 15, Alie Junction; Front Alapasa Mosque I; Fiwasaye Maternity Centre; Gbadebo Street, Behind A.U.D Pry. School I; Gbadebo Street, Behind A.U.D. Pry. School II; 6, Owolabi Street; L. G. Market Gbonmi; 15, Alie Junction (Opp); L. G. Staff Quarters; Front Of Alapasa Mosque II
Osogbo	Ekerin	11, Olugun Street; 31, Ibokun Road; Opp. Olomu Mosque; Opp. 22a Olugun Street; 6, Olugun Lane; Opp. 6, Olugun Lane; 25, Ibokun Road; Idiomo Mosque Area; 30, Olugun Street; 40, Olugun Street; Olomu Mosque Premises; 30, Ibokun Road; 22, Olugun Street
