= Iragberi =

Town on Osun State, Nigeria

- Town
- Location within Nigeria
- Coordinates: 7°46′59″N 4°22′0″E
- Country: Nigeria
- State: Osun

Iragberi is a town located a few kilometres from Ede, Osun State, Nigeria with a population of approximately 80,000 people. It is one of the major towns in Egbedore Local Government, in Osun state.

The town's principal occupation is farming; the varied crop selection includes rice, cocoa, coffea, cassava, maize, beans, yam and kola nuts, as well as coal production.

The first ruler of Iragberi was Oba Aara Akoni-Agogo; he was said to be an emigrant from Ẹfọ̀n-Alààyè, a town to the east. The title of the town's traditional ruler is 'Aragberi,' which is believed to be derived from phrase 'Ara gba ori', meaning "Thunder has collected the head," which is from folklore that describes a scenario where the first king, nicknamed "Ara," collected the head of an individual who was tormenting the then Olu of Ibadan. The current Aragberi of Iragberi is Oba (Dr.) Folorunsho Agboade Makanju, who was crowned in 2014.

The neighboring towns include Ede, Awo, Iwoye, Ara, Aato, Ejigbo and Inisa. The sons and daughters of this ancient town are well read and traveled.

The town has two major tourist centres, but they are no longer functional; the first is a palm tree with two heads, while the second one is Woru Chain (a place where one of the powerful ancestors inhumed/concealed himself in land).
