= Oyan (town) =

Where it was located

Coordinates: 8°2′50″N 4°45′50″E

Oyan is a town in Odo Otin North Local Council Development Authority in Osun State, Nigeria. The traditional title of the king is His Royal Majesty (HRM) Oloyan of Oyan, there are 4 prominent ruling houses in oyan, they include; Elemo's Rulling House, Olaojo's Rulling House, Daodu's Rulling House, and Olomooba's Rulling House.

Oyan situated between latitudes 8.031089 and 8.060466 N and longitude 4.742298 and 4.781107 E of the Greenwich meridian. Its postal code is 231107.
