= Iperindo =

- Town
- Postal code: 233113
- Area code: 233111
- Geocode: Iperindo, Ipole, Atakunmasa East, Osun: 233111

Iperindo is a town in Osun state, Nigeria, situated about 42 kilometres (26 mi) from the state capital, Osogbo, and about 341 kilometres (212 mi) from the national capital, Abuja.

== Climate ==
Western Nigeria experiences wet and dry seasons. In Iperindo, the dry season (October 27 to April 10) is hot, humid, and partially cloudy, whereas the wet season (rest of the year) is warm, oppressive, and overcast. September is the rainiest month, with 25.5 rainy days on average and an average rainfall of 230 millimetres (9.2 inches), whereas December is the driest, with only 1.2 days with more than 1.0 millimetre (0.04 inches) of precipitation and an average rainfall of 5.1 millimetres (0.2 inches). Extreme seasonal variance in monthly rainfall is a problem in Iperindo.

The average annual temperature ranges from 19 °C (66 °F) to 33 °C (92 °F), rarely falling below 16 °C (60 °F) or rising over 36 °C (97 °F). The hot season is from January 22 to April 4, with daily high temperatures that typically exceed 32 °C (90 °F). March has an average high temperature of 33 °C (91 °F) and low temperature of 23 °C (73 °F), making it the hottest month of the year in Iperindo. During the cool season, which runs from June 14 to October 7, a daily high temperature below 29 °C (84 °F) is typical. August, with average lows of 21 °C (70 °F) and highs of 28 °C (82 °F), is the coolest month of the year in Iperindo.

Iperindo experiences a substantial seasonal change in the average proportion of cloud cover throughout the year. Skies are generally cloudy between February 13 and November 16, and clearer the rest of the year, with December being the clearest month (50% clear or partly overcast) and April being the cloudiest (86% cloudy).
