= Eti-Oni =

Eti-Oni is a town located in Atakumosa East local government area of The State of Osun, south-west Nigeria. Eti-Oni is one of the numerous towns that make up the ancient majestic Kingdom of Ilesa. Eti-Oni is the home of the 2nd oldest known cocoa plantation in Nigeria with the oldest in Ijon, Lagos, it is believed cocoa was first introduced in Nigeria at Ijon by Captain JPL Davies, it was from Eti-Oni that cocoa was spread to many other communities of south-west Nigeria. The crop over time became one of Nigeria's major cash crops, a major source of income for the then South West Region of Nigeria before the discovery of crude oil in the late 1950s. The indigenes of Eti-Oni are part of the Ijesha clan of The State of Osun. The town is ruled by a monarch bearing the title Oloni of Eti-Oni Land the incumbent is His Royal Majesty Oba Dokun Thompson who ascended the throne in 2008.

== History of Eti-Oni ==
The Eti-Oni town was founded after the Ekiti-Parapo War against the Ibadan empire. The sounds made by the guns used for the war between 1878–1886, supplied by Gureje Thompson (the founder of the town) gave the name to the war called the Kiriji war. The chaos unleashed by the war got the attention of the British colonialist army which had to step in. The war ended on September 23, 1886.

Upon peace achieved in the land, Gureje-Thompson, who founded the town, introduced crops like cocoa, cassava, rice and kola nuts to the new thriving community by 1896 - 1910. With the fertile land of Eti-Oni, the crops thrived.

== Rebirth of Eti-Oni ==
The 2016 Cocoa Festival is a commemoration of 130 years end of the bloody Kiriji war which brought lasting peace to Yorubaland.

The recently held cocoa festival of Eti-Oni was organised to celebrate 120 years of cocoa cultivation in the town.

The EDG's vision is to transform Eti-Oni into a sustainable town while maintaining its African identity, furthermore by 2020 Eti-Oni is planned to be a fully developed town with functional cocoa processing plants for premium chocolate product and a tourist destination for its environs, upgrading the once-forgotten town to one of the major economic hubs for cocoa in the region.
