= Bronze Head from Ife =

Sculpture from Ife

Coordinates: 7.4722°N 4.5556°E

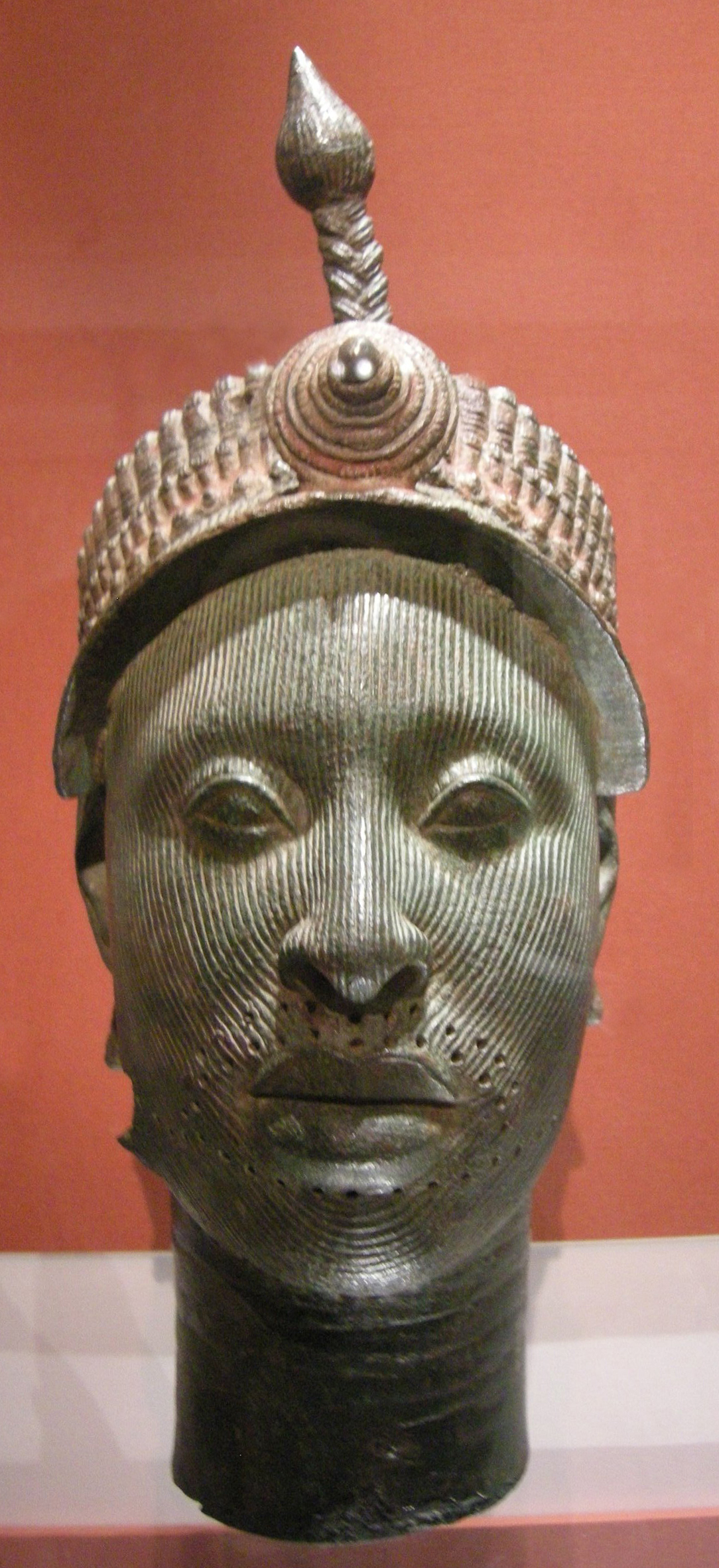
- The Ife Head on display at the British Museum
- Material: "Bronze", actually brass
- Size: height: 35 cm (14 in) width: 12.5 cm (4.9 in) depth: 15 cm (5.9 in)
- Weight: 5.1 kg (11 lb)
- Created: 14th/early 15th century
- Present location: British Museum, London
- Registration: Af1939,34.1
- Culture: Medieval Yoruba

The Bronze Head from Ife, or Ife Head, is one of eighteen copper alloy sculptures that were unearthed in 1938 at Ife in Nigeria, the religious and royal centre of the Yoruba people. It is believed to represent a king (Ooni). It was probably made in the 14th-15th century CE. The realism and sophisticated craftsmanship of the objects challenged the dismissive and patronising Western conceptions of African art. The naturalistic features of the Ife heads are unique and the stylistic similarities of these works "suggest that they were made by an individual artist or in a single workshop."

== Description ==
Like most West African "bronzes" the piece is actually made of copper alloyed with other metals, described by the British Museum as "heavily leaded zinc-brass". Modern practice in museums and archaeology is increasingly to avoid terms such as bronze or brass for historical objects in favour of the all-embracing "copper alloy". The head is made using the lost wax technique and is approximately three-quarters life-size, measuring 35 cm high. The artist designed the head in a very naturalistic style. The face is covered with incised striations, but the lips are unmarked. The headdress suggests a crown of complex construction, composed of different layers of tube shaped beads and tassels. This decoration is typical of the bronze heads from Ife. The crown is topped by a crest, with a rosette and a plume which now is slightly bent to one side. The crown's surface includes the remains of both red and black paint. The lifelike rendering of sculptures from medieval Ife is exceptional in Sub-Saharan African art, and initially was considered the earliest manifestation of a tradition that continued in Yoruba art, in early Benin art and other pieces.

== Excavation and removal ==
The Ife Head was found by accident in 1938 at the Wunmonije Compound, Ife, during house-building works amongst sixteen other brass and copper heads and the upper half of a brass figure. Most of the objects found in the Wunmonije Compound and neighbouring areas ended up in the National Museum of Ife, but a few pieces were taken from Nigeria and are now in the collections of major museums. This particular Ife Head was taken from Nigeria by the editor of the Daily Times of Nigeria, Henry Maclear Bate, who probably sold it to the National Art Collections Fund, which then passed it onto the British Museum in 1939.

The discovery of the sculptures was the spur for the government to control the export of antiquities from Nigeria. Before this was achieved, this head made its way to London via Paris and another two were sent to America. Attempts to prevent further exports, prompted by Leo Frobenius, were successfully promulgated in 1938, when legislation was enacted by the colonial authorities. Frobenius was a German ethnologist and archaeologist who was one of the first European scholars to take a serious interest in African art, especially that of the Yoruba.

== Ife ==
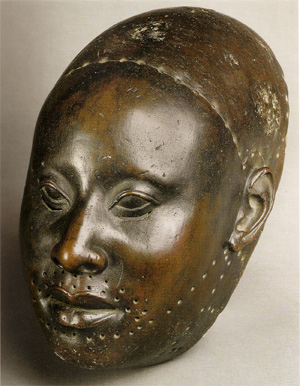
Yoruba copper mask for King Obalufon II; circa 1300 CE; copper; height: 29.2 cm; discovered at Ife; Ife Museum of Antiquities (Ife, Nigeria)

The Ife head is thought to be a portrait of a ruler known as an Ooni or Oni. It was probably made under the patronage of King Obalufon Alayemore whose famous naturalistic life-size face mask in copper shares stylistic features with this work. Today among the Yoruba, Obalufon is identified as the patron deity of brass casters. The period in which the work was made was an age of prosperity for the Yoruba civilisation, which was built on trade via the River Niger to the peoples of West Africa. Ife is regarded by the Yoruba people as the place where their deities created humans.

The copper used in this sculpture is thought to be from local Nigerian ores, although earlier scholars believed it to have come from Central Europe, North West Mauritania, the Byzantine Empire, or Southern Morocco.

The bronze casts could have been modelled on contemporary terracotta sculptures. A long tradition of terracotta sculpture with similar characteristics existed in the culture prior to the date of the creation of these metal sculptures. Ivory was another material used frequently in African art.

The Ife sculptural tradition is one of several West African artistic traditions, including the Bura of Niger (3rd century CE – 10th century CE), Koma of Ghana (7th century CE – 15th century CE), Igbo-Ukwu of Nigeria (9th century CE – 10th century CE), and Jenne-Jeno of Mali (11th century CE – 12th century CE), that may have been shaped by the earlier West African clay terracotta tradition of the Nok culture of central Nigeria.

== Impact on art history ==
When Frobenius discovered the first example of a similar head it undermined existing Western understanding of African civilisation. Experts did not want to believe that Africa had ever had a civilisation capable of creating artefacts of this quality. Attempting to explain what was thought an anomaly, Frobenius offered his theory that these had been cast by a colony of ancient Greeks established in the thirteenth century BC. He made a claim, widely circulated in the popular press, that his hypothesised ancient Greek colony could be the origin of the ancient legend of the lost civilization of Atlantis.

It is now recognised that these statues represent an indigenous African tradition that attained a high level of realism and refinement. The Ife heads are often considered a great achievement of African culture, and it is believed that they were made by an individual artist in a single workshop.

== Influence on contemporary culture ==
There is widespread use of the Ife Head in logos and branding of Nigerian corporations and educational institutions such as Obafemi Awolowo University in Ile-Ife.

The Ife Head was the symbol for the 1973 All-Africa Games in Lagos.

The Ife Head held by the British Museum was included in the 2010 major exhibition Kingdom of Ife: Sculptures from West Africa, developed in partnership with Nigeria's National Commission for Museums and Monuments, the Museum for African Art, New York and the British Museum. The exhibition was part of a series of events that marked the 50th anniversary of Nigerian independence. In 2011 the Ife Head was included in the British Museum/BBC's A History of the World in 100 Objects

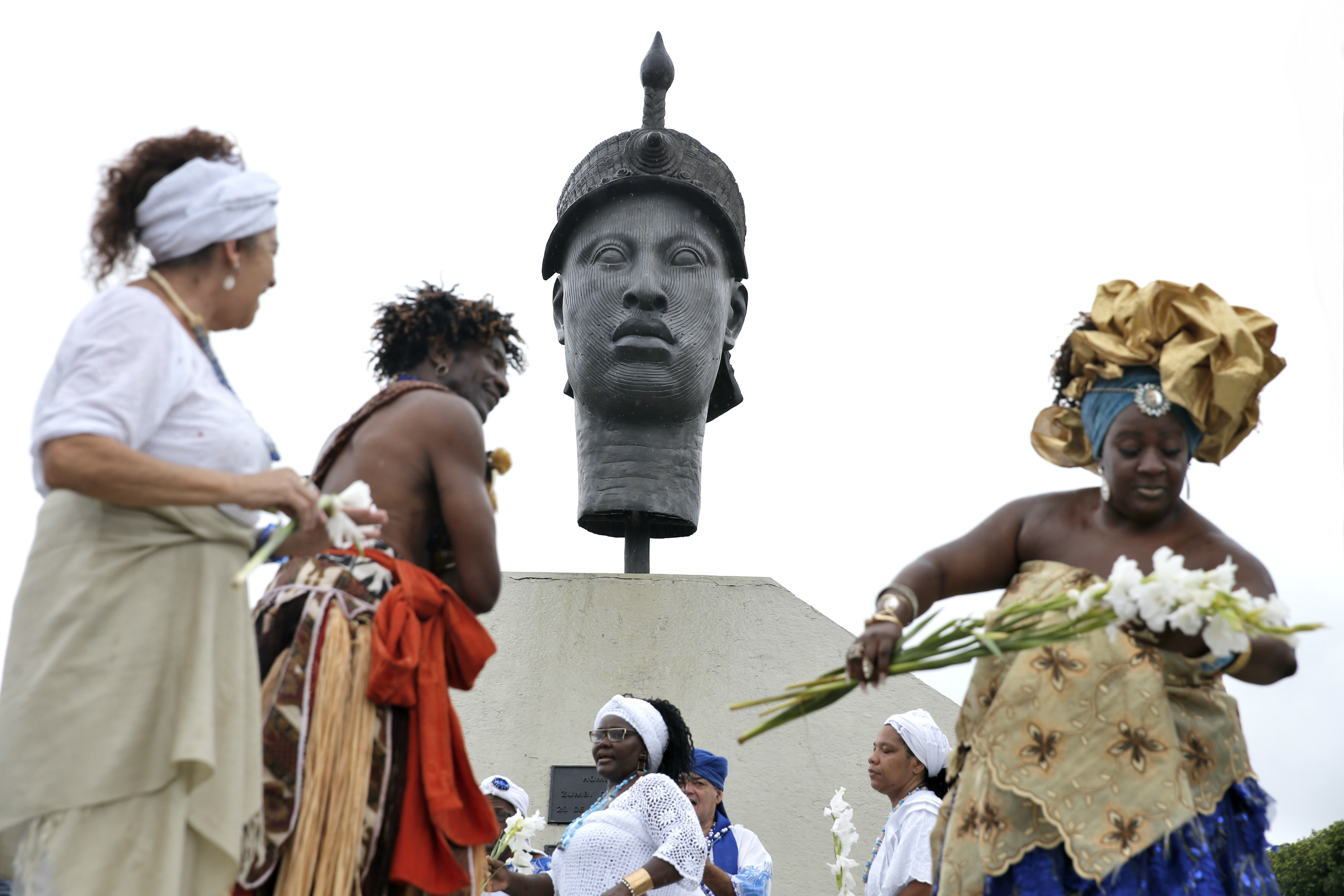
Celebrating Black Awareness Day 2017 at the Zumbi dos Palmares Monument, Rio de Janeiro, Brazil

== See also ==
- Archaeology of Igbo-Ukwu
- Benin Bronzes
- Bronze Head of Queen Idia
- Ife Terracotta Head

Preceded by 62: Hebrew astrolabe	A History of the World in 100 Objects; Object 63	Succeeded by 64: David Vases
