= Ife Terracotta Head =

Sculpture from Ife

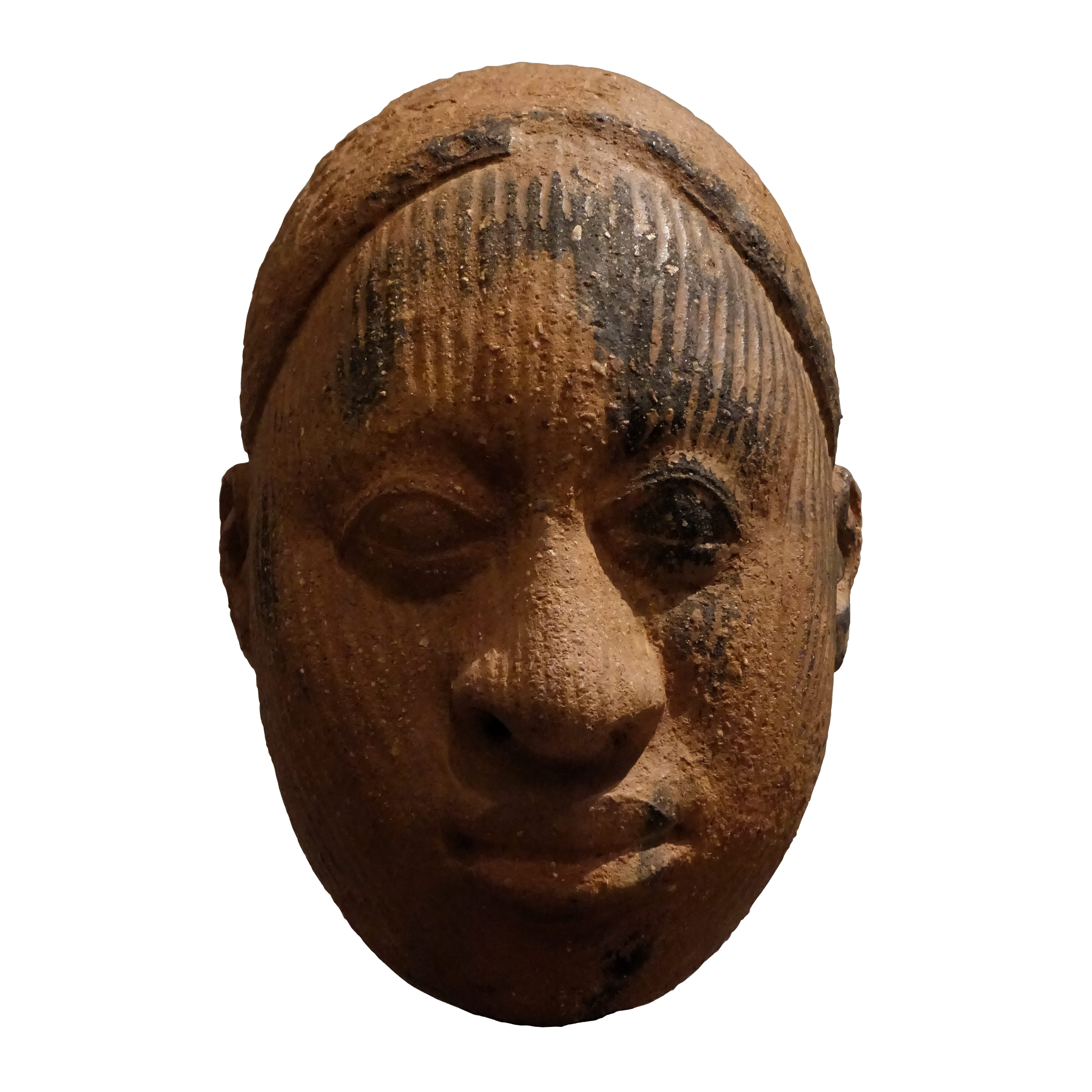
- Material: Terracotta with residue of red pigment and traces of mica
- Size: height: 16 cm (6.3 in)
- Weight: 1.80 kg (4.0 lb)
- Created: Between 12th and 15th century
- Present location: Nigerian National Museum, Lagos
- Registration: Af1934,0716.1
- Culture: Yoruba

The Ife Terracotta Head is a terracotta sculpture, approximately 16 centimetres tall, made by an artist of the Yoruba city of Ile-Ife in what is now Osun State, Nigeria, and dated to between the 12th and 15th centuries. The head depicts a young woman or girl with her hair braided into several buns and a small raised bump on the upper left of the head. This is one of the terracotta heads and figures produces at Ife roughly between 1000 and 1400AD regarded by art historians as among the technically distinctive sculptural traditions of pre-colonial Africa.

== Ife terracotta art ==
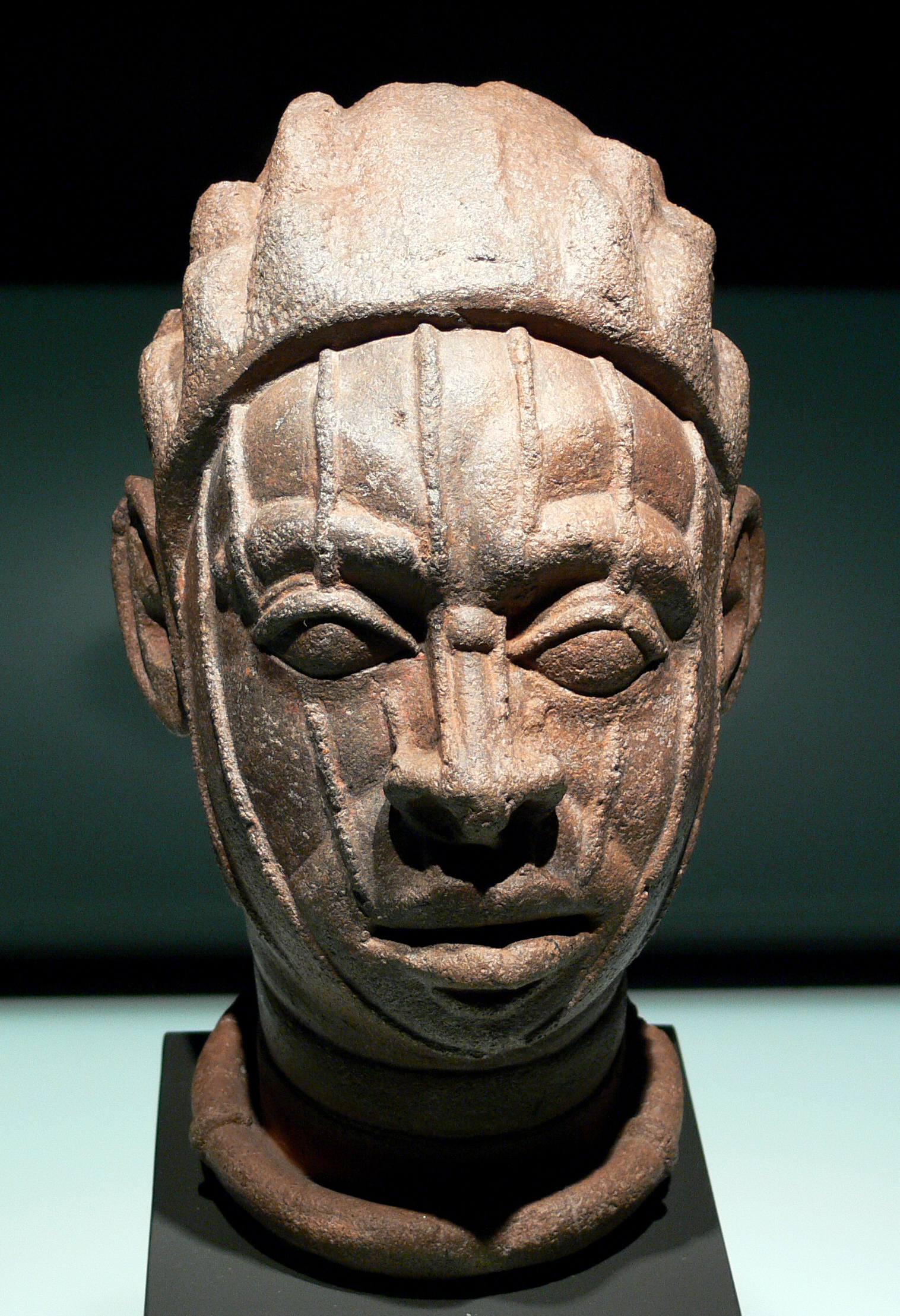
Human head, Ife people, South West Nigeria; terracotta

Ife terracotta art were mostly unknown outside the African region until the early 20th century. German ethnologist Leo Frobenius first encountered sculptures from Ife in 1910. A lot more of these art works were discovered on the grounds of the former palace in Ife in 1938, a discovery that brought about the reassessment of the sophistication of pre colonial West African art.

In Yoruba tradition, women have historically worked on clay sculptors producing these sacred and secular pieces, while men mostly worked on stone, wood and metal pieces. The art-historical importance of these works lies in their highly developed and distinctive sculptural style, some describe as naturalistic, portraitlike, and even humanistic. Most of these art include human heads and figures that represents crowned royalty and their attendants, and also images of diseased, deformed persons

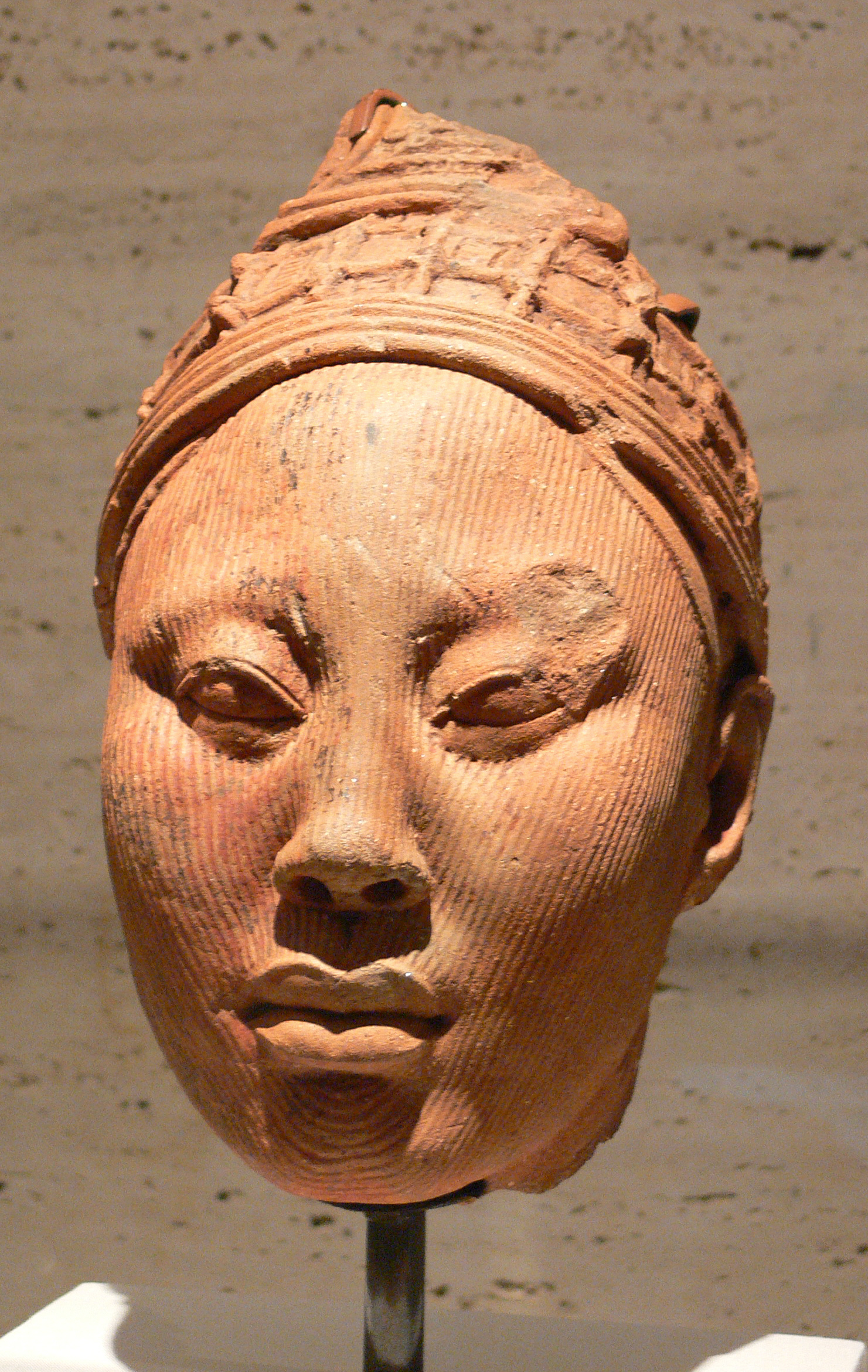
Ife Head (possibly of a king, 12th-14th century) on view at the Kimbell Art Museum, Fort Worth

Because these terracotta art works are rare, natural and have high market value, they have long circulated in the international art trade. These heads are held by major museums and private collections outside Nigeria including the British Museum in London and the Kimbell Art Museum in Fort Worth, Texas. Under the Nigerian law, the export and trade of these objects are restricted and pieces that reach international antiquities market are often the products of illicit excavation or theft

== Repatriation ==
=== Removal and trafficking ===
According to Nigerian and Dutch officials, the terracotta head was stolen in Nigeria and smuggled out of the country through the Accra International Airport in, Ghana using forged export documents, before being shipped to the Netherlands

=== Interception in the Netherlands ===
The terracotta head was intercepted by Dutch customs officer in Schiphol at the Amsterdam Airport found in a package addresses to a private individual in the Netherlands with forged accompanying documents. The Information and Heritage Inspectorates of the Netherlands were contacted who then reached out to their Nigerian counterparts, resulting to the beginning of the return of the artefact

=== Diplomatic contact and legal groundwork ===
The Information and Heritage Inspectorates notified the Nigerian Embassy in The Hague, opening a formal diplomatic contact between both governments over the artefact. The Nigerian Embassy alongside the legal department of the National Commission for Museums and Monuments began providing Nigeria's claim to the object, citing Nigerian legislation vesting ownership of antiquities in the state from the National Commission for Museums and Monuments Act as well as Nigeria's obligation and rights under the 1970 UNESCO Convention which it ratified in 1972, and the 1995 UNIDROIT Convention on Stolen or Illegally Exported Cultural Objects

=== Temporary custody at the Wereldmuseum ===
While these claims were being verified, the terracotta head was placed in the temporary care of the Wereldmuseum Leiden in Rotterdam, an institution known for its long experience exhibiting and conserving African material culture.

=== Formal handover ===
On the 2nd of November 2020, the Ife Terracotta Head was formally handed over to Nigeria in a ceremony in the Netherlands. The Secretary-General of the Dutch Ministry of Education, Culture and Science, Maryan Hammersma transferred custody of the object to Kabiru Musa, Charge d’Affaires at the Nigerian Embassy in The Hague The Dutch officials referred to it as the first object formally restituted by the Netherlands to a state party under the 1970 UNESCO Convention on the Means of Prohibiting and Preventing the Illicit Import, Export and Transfer of Ownership

A further ceremony was held at the Federal Ministry of Information and Culture in Abuja, Nigeria attended by the Minister of Information and Culture, Alhaji Lai Mohammed, Minister of Foreign Affairs, Geoffrey Onyema, Netherlands Ambassador to Nigeria, Harry Van Dijk, Nigeria Charge de Affairs to Netherlands, Kabiru Musa and the Director-General National Commission for Museum and Monuments, Professor Abba Isa Tijani. Receiving the head, Lai Mohammed described it as "priceless and timeless" and said its return marked a milestone in Nigeria's wider effort, launched the previous year, to recover antiquities held abroad.

The Artefact was then transferred to the National Museum in Lagos for documentation, quarantine and conservation assessment.

== See also ==
- Ife
- Benin Bronzes
- Ife National Museum
- National Commission for Museums and Monuments
- Nigerian National Museum
