= Usman Lawal-Osula =

Nigerian businessman

- Born: Usman Lawal-Osula; March 12, 1910; Benin City, Nigeria
- Died: December 2, 1972 (aged 62); Benin City, Nigeria
- Occupations: Businessman; Journalist; Arala of Benin
- Spouse(s): Lydia Modupe Lawal-Osula (January 26, 1950 – December 2, 1972; his death)

Chief Usman Mofeyintioluwa Lawal-Osula (March 12, 1910 – December 2, 1972) was a Nigerian businessman with interests across insurance, real estate and other industries. As a member of the Benin royal family, he held a hereditary traditional title as the Arala of Benin at the time of his death.

== Legal battle of will ==
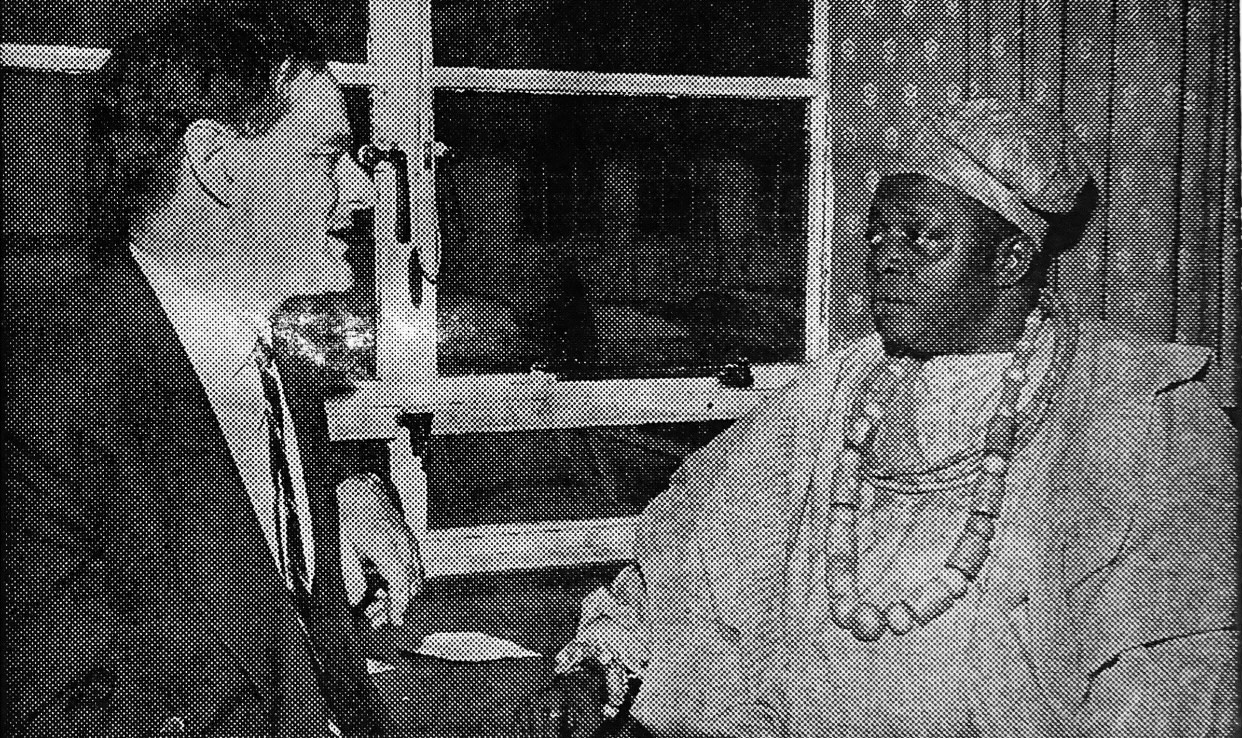
Mr. Courtney Gidley (left), a former member of the Nigeria Police Force and Chief U.M. Lawal-Osula

The case of the will of Chief U.M. Lawal-Osula has become one of the most notable family law cases taught around the world as final judgment came after 23 years of disputes and court battles. At the time of his death in 1972, a will written by Chief U.M. Lawal-Osula dated November 22, 1968 was found.

By the Benin native law and custom, a Benin traditional chief is succeeded by his eldest son at death but before the death of Chief U.M. Lawal-Osula, he wrote a will in which he made provisions for his wife and children while stating he has no living son. However, following the death of U.M. Lawal-Osula, a man who provisions were not made for in the will claimed to be the eldest son of the chief (the plaintiff) and this caused controversy over the question of who inherits the estate of Chief U.M. Lawal-Osula, prompting a series of court battles where the wife and children of Chief U.M. Lawal-Osula became defendants.

In 1986, the plaintiffs initiated an action in which they claimed against the defendants that the last testament of the testator dated November 22, 1968 is null and void in the Bendel State High Court despite the chief explicitly stating "...that nobody shall modify or vary this Will. It is my will that the native law and custom of Benin shall not apply to alter or modify this my Will." However, in 1995, two years after the death of the 1st defendant, Mrs. Lydia Lawal-Osula, the Supreme Court of Nigeria made a ruling that the real estate and personal properties comprised in the estate of Chief Usman Mofeyintioluwa Lawal-Osula be handed over to his wife and children as stated in the will.

== Personal life and death ==
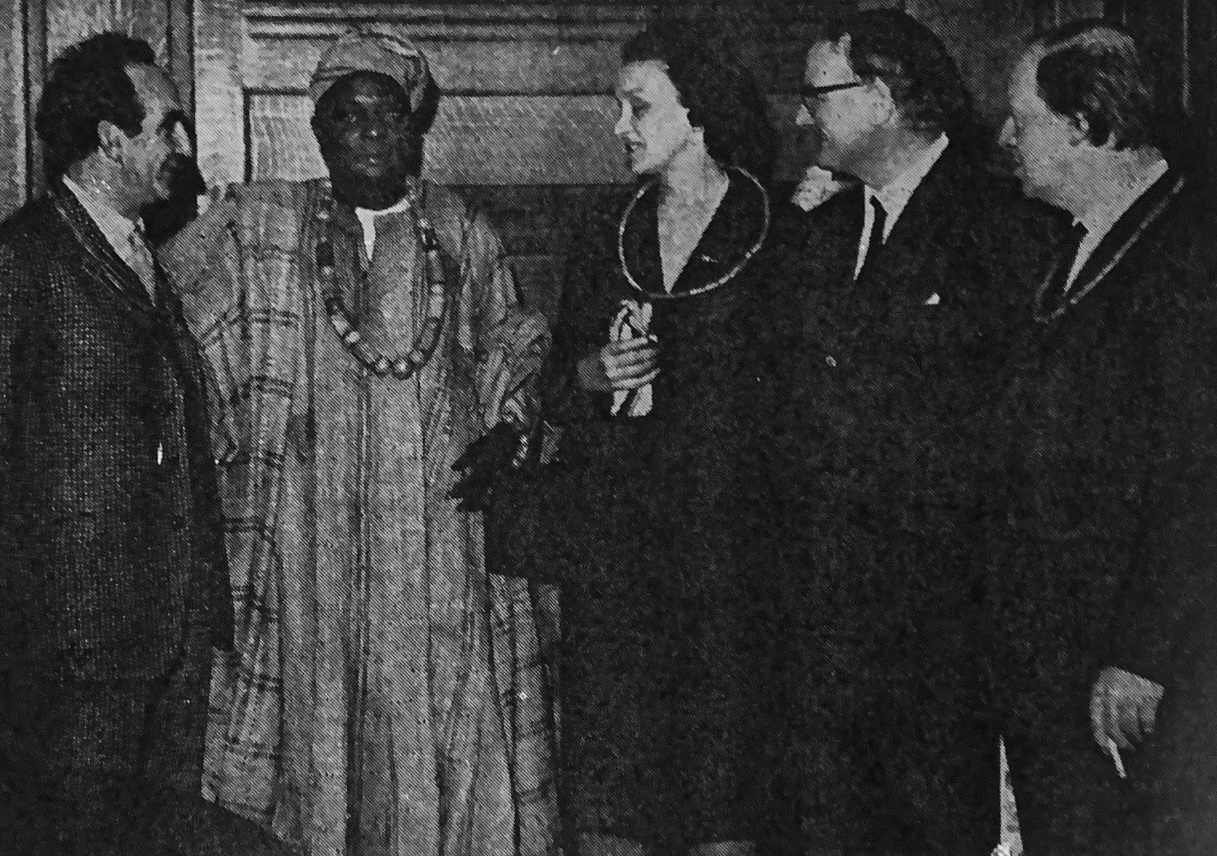
Chief U.M. Lawal-Osula (second left) and friends

Chief Usman Lawal-Osula was the great grandson of Princess Aghayubini, the daughter of Oba Osemwende, the 33rd Oba of Benin. In 1957, he was honoured with the title, Arala of Benin by Oba Akenzua II, his cousin and 37th Oba of Benin.

He was Chairman of the Midwest Art Council and Vice President of the Nigerian Arts Council, now the National Council for Arts and Culture. He was instrumental in providing evidence in support of the creation of the Mid-West State of Nigeria before Sir Henry Willink and others. In his earlier years, Chief Usman Lawal-Osula was appointed to the Benin Divisional Administrative Committee in 1948 and became the first Muslim to serve in the colonial administration of the Division. With diverse business interests across Nigeria, he served on the boards of multiple organizations such as Midwest Textile Mills and T.A. Oni & Sons, while also playing a pivotal role in bringing the United Bank for Africa to the mid-western region of Nigeria following the restructuring from British and French Bank Limited (BFB) in 1961 after Nigeria's independence.

Chief Usman Lawal-Osula died in his Benin City home on December 2, 1972, the day after returning from hospital in England, Great Britain. At the time of his death, he was survived by his wife, Chief (Mrs.) Lydia Modupe Lawal-Osula JP and his four daughters: Chief Dr. Irene Odaro, a retired Solicitor-General and former spouse of Moses Odaro, Hajia Morenike Ibrahim-Yahaya, Princess Iyabo Ifueko Akai and Princess Edugie Joan Nzeribe, the wife of Senator Arthur Nzeribe.

== Philanthropy ==
Chief Usman Lawal-Osula was an international art collector and sponsored the third floor of the Benin City National Museum. In 1965, Chief Lawal-Osula appealed through Sir Francis Cumming-Bruce, 8th Baron Thurlow to the British people during a party honouring the chief in Lagos to let them have back in Benin some of the treasures which were looted during the Benin Expedition of 1897. He was also instrumental in getting Vice Admiral Sir Gilbert Stephenson to return a Benin ceremonial sacrificial sword acquired during the Benin Expedition to the Oba of Benin through his acquaintance with his son, Gilbert L. Stephenson (Jnr.) who was the Secretary of independent organization Voluntary Service Overseas at the time.

== Publications ==
Chief Usman Lawal-Osula had published several books and articles. He owned a printing press and established The Benin Voice in 1949 as the first newspaper in the mid-western region of Nigeria. A memoir of one of his visits to Great Britain is currently in a library at McGill University.
