= Okoroji Oti =

Maazi Okoroji Oti was a local chief in Ujari, one of the nineteen villages in Arochukwu, Abia State, Nigeria. He was reputable for being a slave merchant who built the Okoroji House, a historic house in Igboland. Oral history has it that four hundred people were sacrificed to Ibini Ukpabi after his death as the head of the oracle.
