= Irene Ododo Odaro =

Nigerian lawyer and philanthropist

Princess Irene Ododo Odaro (née Lawal-Osula) (March 15, 1951 – March 30, 2021) was a Nigerian lawyer, philanthropist and member of the Benin royal family. She gained prominence as former Solicitor General of Edo State. She was the first person to concurrently hold dual positions as Permanent Secretary, Law Review Commission, Edo State, Nigeria and Permanent Secretary, Ministry of Justice, Edo State, Nigeria. Beyond her career, she was a fervent advocate for women's and children's rights, as well as sponsor of arts and culture.

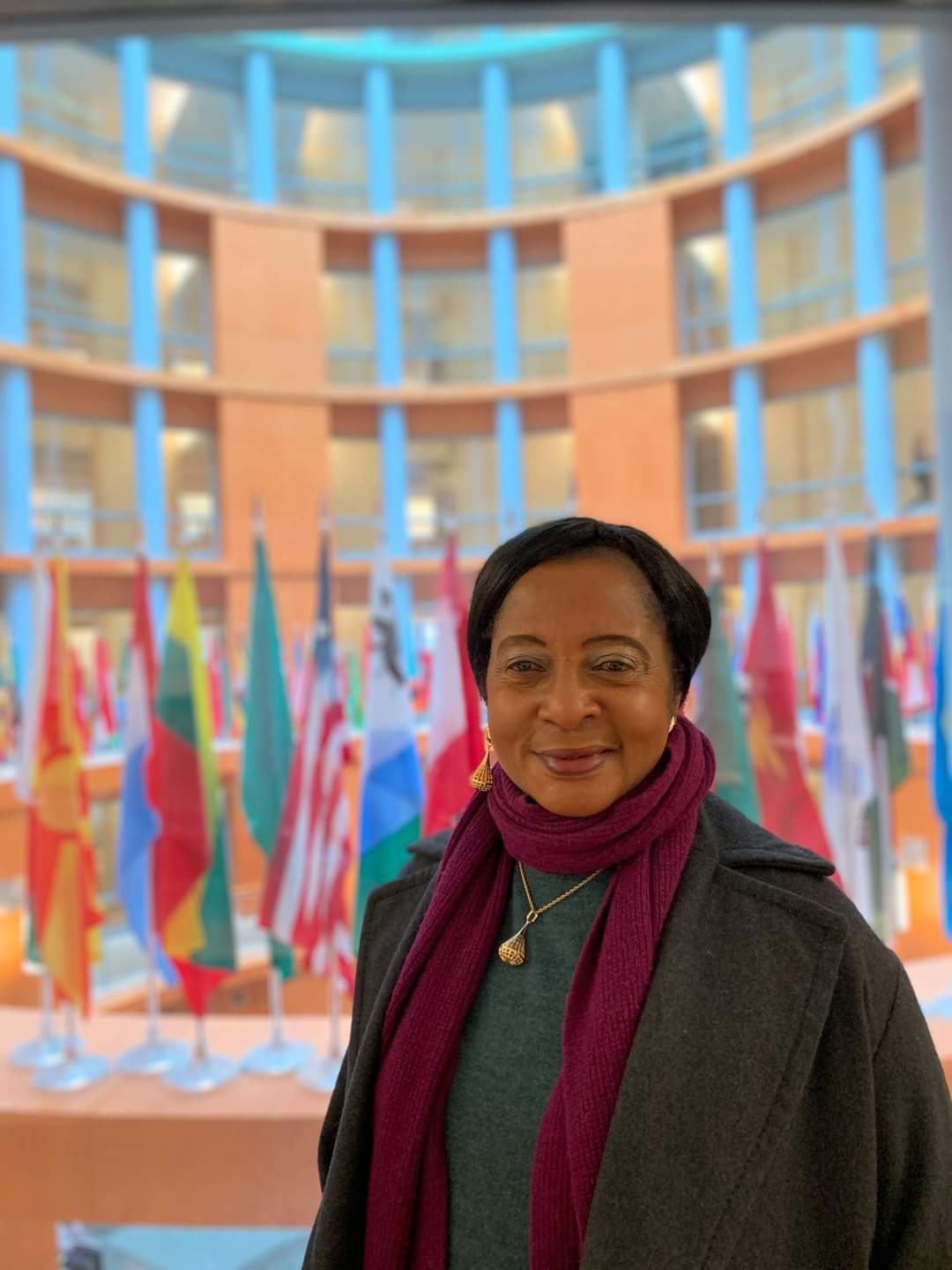
Irene Ododo Odaro in Washington DC circa 2017

== Early life and education ==
Born in Benin City on March 15, 1951 into the Benin Royal Family, Irene Ododo Lawal-Osula was the first-born child of Honourable Chief Usman Mofeyintioluwa Lawal-Osula, Arala of the Benin Kingdom, and Chief Dr. Lydia Modupe Lawal-Osula (née Imona-Russell), a member of the Ozalla Royal Family. Her mother was the first child of Reverend Isaiah Imona-Russell, Crown Prince of Ozalla, who abdicated the throne to serve as Anglican clergy. The name "Ododo," meaning "scarlet," was bestowed upon her by His Royal Majesty, Oba Akenzua II, symbolizing her royal status in Benin culture.

Odaro's academic journey began at St. James Anglican Primary School and Anglican Girls' Primary School in Benin City. She continued her studies at Fiwasiaye Girls Grammar School in Akure, Ondo State, and later at Anglican Girls' Grammar School, Benin City. Pursuing higher education, she attended studied Law at Ahmadu Bello University, Zaria and the University of Lagos where she earned her Bachelor of Laws degree, graduating with honours in 1977. She advanced her studies at the Nigerian Law School, Victoria Island, Lagos State and was called to the Bar as a Barrister and Solicitor of the Supreme Court of Nigeria in June 1978.

== Career and achievements ==
Odaro's legal career of over three decades was committed to public service. She played a pivotal role in the administration of justice in Bendel and Edo State, contributing to legal reforms and upholding the rule of law. She began her career in 1979 as a State Counsel, Bendel State. She distinguished herself and was entrusted with significant positions including Director of Public Prosecutions, Director of Civil Litigation, Director of Legal Drafting and was the longest serving Administrator-General and Public Trustee of Edo State - a position she held for 8 years from 1991-1998. She was also appointed as Permanent Secretary, Law Review Commission, Edo State. Finally, retiring as Solicitor General of Edo State and Permanent Secretary of the Ministry of Justice.

After retirement, she was the first woman ever appointed as Commissioner of the Edo State Independent Electoral Commission (EDSIEC) by the executive Governor of Edo State, Godwin Obaseki - a position she held until her death.

== Advocacy and philanthropy ==
Beyond her career, Odaro was deeply committed to humanitarian causes. She was an active member of the International Federation of Women Lawyers (FIDA), serving as the Chairperson (President) of the Benin City chapter for over a decade (1998- 2012). In this capacity, she championed campaigns against human trafficking, female circumcision, and the inhumane treatment of widows, striving to protect the rights of women and children.

Additionally, she was a board member of the Society To Heighten Awareness of Women And Children Abuse (SOTHAWACA), an organization dedicated to breaking the cycle of abuse and neglect, and strengthening families.

Odaro sponsored the rejuvenation of the National Museum, Benin City, Edo State. A bronze bust of her is displayed on the third floor of the museum in recognition of her contributions to arts and culture. Chief (Dr.) Mrs. Ododo Odaro rejuvenates National Museum, Benin City.

== Personal life ==
Odaro was a published author of poetry, essays, and children's books. She was married to Dr. Moses Osaruyi Odaro, a Nigerian banker, academic and former CEO of New Nigeria Bank. Together they had four children: Esohe, Otasowie, Ame and Osayaba.

== Death and legacy ==
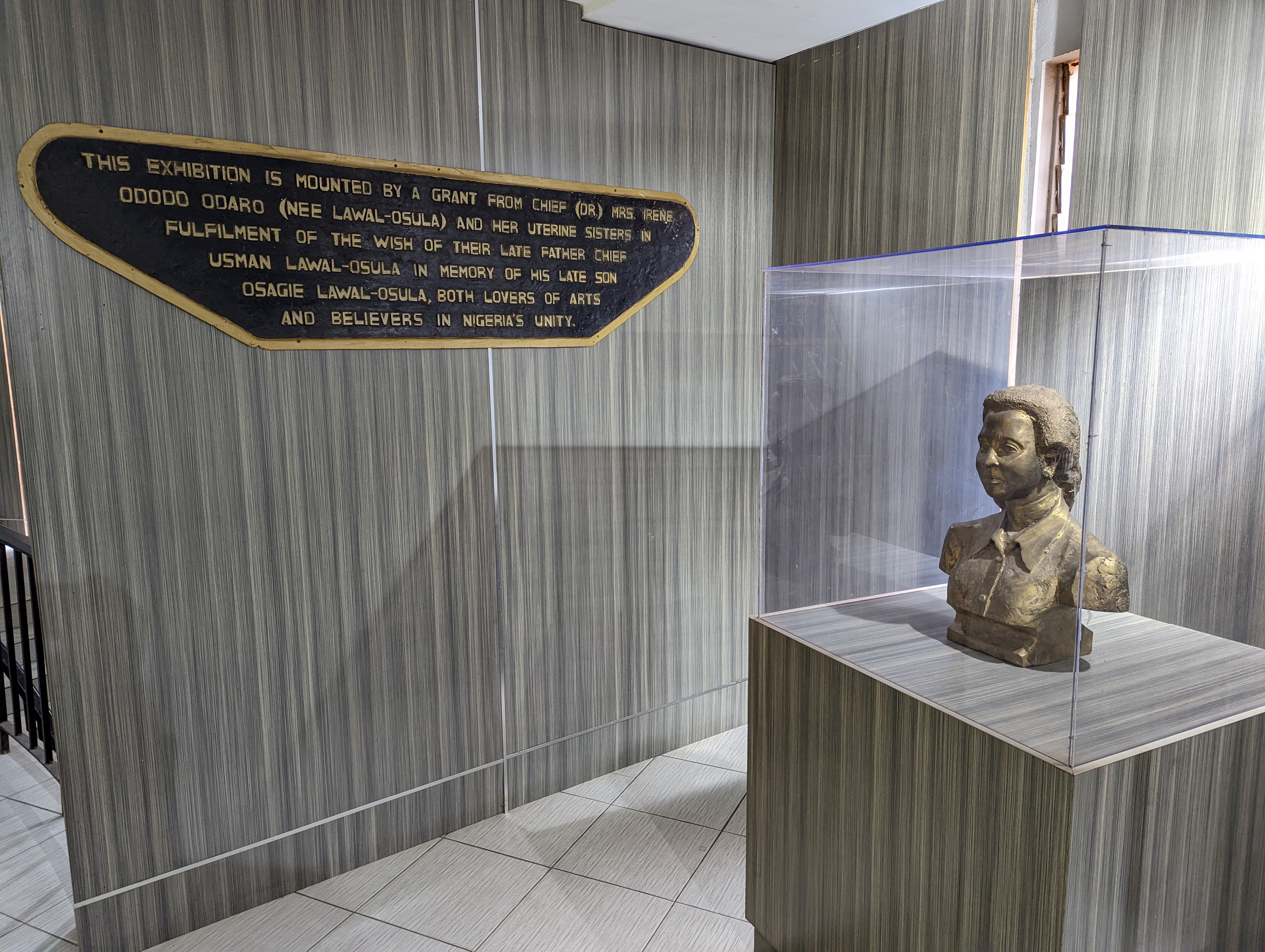
Bronze Bust of Irene Ododo Odaro on display at the Benin City Museum, March 2022

Princess Irene Ododo Odaro died suddenly on March 30, 2021, after a brief illness. Her death was mourned by many, including the Edo State Government and Judiciary, which held a special valedictory service in her honor.

Her legacy continues through the Irene Ododo Foundation established in March 2022 and dedicated to philanthropy and cultural enrichment, reflecting her lifelong dedication to improving society.

The foundation makes periodic grants and donations as judged suitable by the trustees to advance the causes that Irene Ododo was passionate about and create positive outcomes for people and the society.
