= Lugard =

Lugard may refer to:

- Edward Lugard, British army officer.
- Sir Frederick Lugard, 1st Baron Lugard, British colonial bureaucrat and military officer.
- Lugard Footbridge, in Kaduna, Nigeria, named after Baron Lugard.
- Lugard Road, one of many places in Hong Kong named after Baron Lugard.
- PS Lugard, a Uganda Railway paddle steamer named after Baron Lugard and built in 1927.
- PS Lugard II, a Kenya and Uganda Railways and Harbours paddle steamer named after Baron Lugard and built in 1946.
- Lugard is also the capital city of Murandy in the Wheel of Time series of novels by Robert Jordan.
- Owusu Yeboah Lugard, named after Edward Lugard
