= Abba Isa Tijani =

Nigerian professor

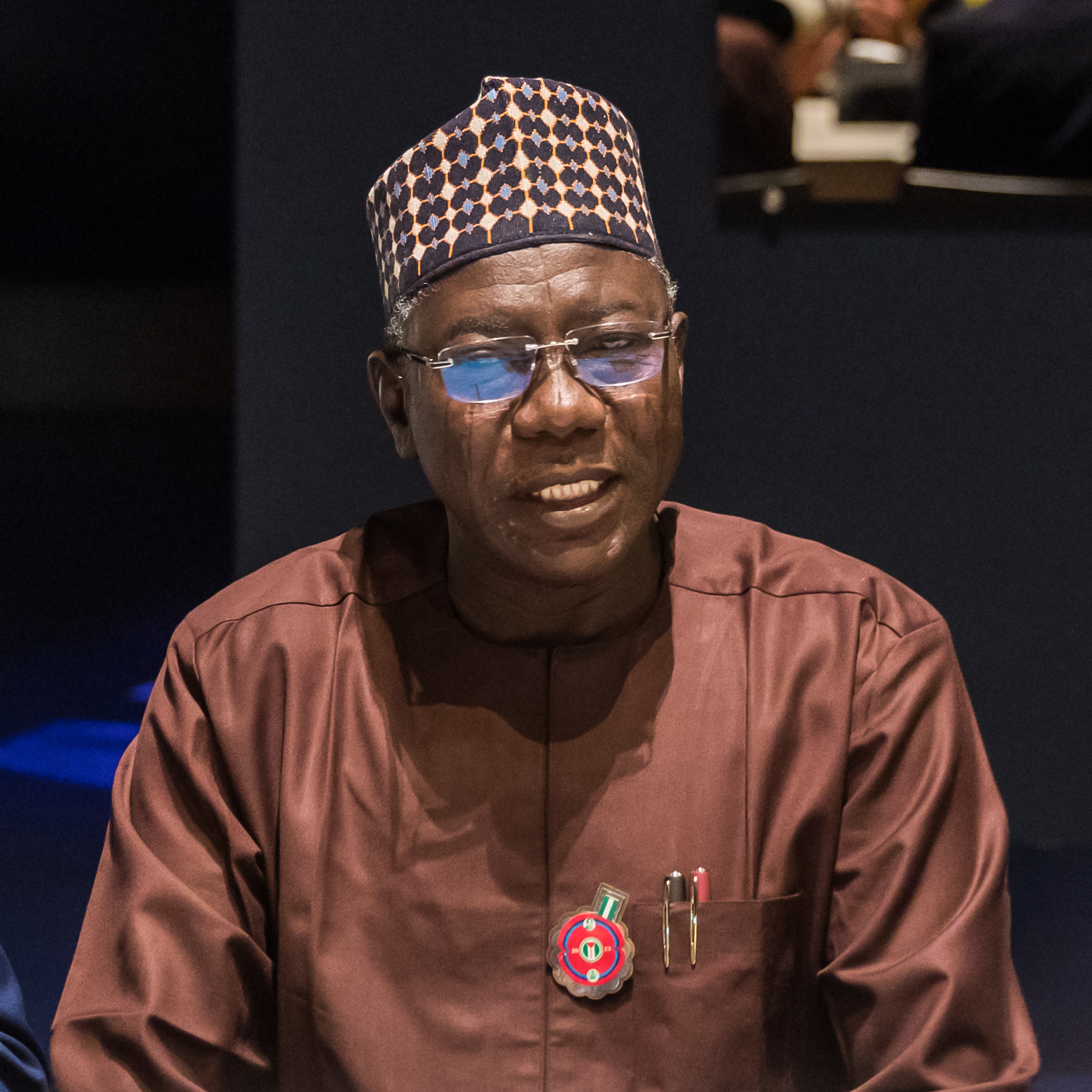
Abba Isa Tijani

Abba Isa Tijani is a Nigerian professor of museology and anthropology. In 2020 he was appointed director general of Nigeria's National Commission for Museums and Monuments (NCMM).

From 2005 to 2008 Tijani worked for the School of Oriental and African Studies at the University of London on a research project funded by the Arts and Humanities Research Council. He then joined the University of Maiduguri, where he was an Associate Professor of Museology and Anthropology, the Acting Director of the Centre for the Study and Promotion of Cultural Sustainability, the Head of the Department of Fine and Creative Arts and the Deputy Director of the university's Archive and Records Unit.

Tijani was appointed director general of the NCCM in September 2020. He helped negotiate the return of Benin Bronzes from two British universities, the University of Aberdeen and Jesus College, Cambridge, in October 2021.

== Works ==
- Borrowing time: ethnoarchaeology at the Institute : exhibition catalogue. London: Museum Studies Department, Institute of Archaeology, University College, 1994.
- (with Mala M. Daura and Waziri A. Gazali) Access to land under derived rights arrangement in Lake Alau, north eastern Nigeria. Maiduguri, Nigeria: Faculty of Social and Management Sciences, University of Maiduguri, 2000.
