= Okoroji House Museum =

Historic house museum in Nigeria

Coordinates: 5.39473°N 7.90465°E

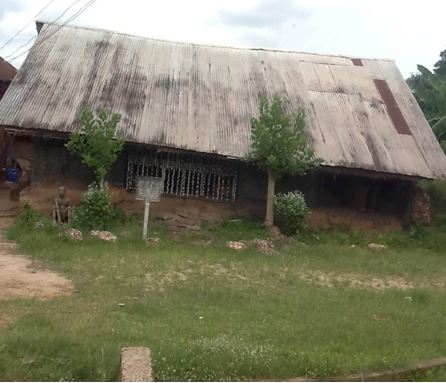
External view of Chief Okoroji House

The Okoroji House Museum or Okoroji House, (Igbo: Ulo Nta Okoroji, Ogbuti Okoroji), is a historic house and museum located in Ujari, a village in Arochukwu, Abia State, Eastern Nigeria. The house was declared a national monument in 1972 by the National Commission for Museums and Monuments.

== History and structure ==
The house was built during the 17th century by Maazi Okoroji Oti, a local chief and slave merchant, who was active during the trans-atlantic slave trade. The house is made of mud while its roof is made of aluminium zinc. The interior showcases various sacred shrine objects, historical artifacts, slave chains, brass manillas, swords and guns. Chief Okoroji's House

Lead Section Chief Okoroji's House (also known as the Okoroji House Museum) is a historic building and national monument located in the Ujari village of Arochukwu, Abia State, Nigeria. It was built in the 17th century by Maazi Okoroji Oti, a local chief and prominent figure in the Aro Confederacy. The house was officially declared a national monument in 1972 by the National Commission for Museums and Monuments (NCMM).

History and Architecture The house is a rare surviving example of early Igbo traditional architecture, constructed primarily of mud walls with a roof that was originally thatched but later replaced with corrugated metal. The interior of the building serves as a museum, housing a vast collection of pre-colonial and colonial-era artifacts. These include sacred shrine objects, brass manillas (ancient currency), ceremonial swords, and relics from the Transatlantic slave trade, such as slave chains.

Cultural Significance As a designated heritage site, the house is a key landmark on the "Long Juju Slave Route." It represents the historical influence of the Aro people in trade and regional governance. In recent years, the site has been repositioned as a center for heritage tourism in South-Eastern Nigeria.

Government Listing

Cultural Reference

Academic/Heritage Site

News Source
