= Olugbile Holloway =

Nigerian civil servant

Director General of National Commission for Museums and Monuments
- Incumbent
- Assumed office March 2024
- Appointed by: Bola Tinubu

Personal details
- Education: University of Kent (BA); University of Buckingham (MBA)
- Alma mater: King's College, Lagos
- Occupation: Public servant, marketing executive

Olugbile Holloway is a Nigerian public servant and cultural heritage advocate who is the Director General of the National Commission for Museums and Monuments (NCMM), a position he assumed in 2024 following his appointment by President Bola Tinubu. Prior to his public service, Holloway built a career in advertising and brand consultancy, working with major Nigerian and multinational companies.

== Early life and education ==
Holloway attended St. Saviour's School in Ebute Metta, followed by King's College Lagos and International School Lagos. He later studied at Wesley College, Dublin. He earned a Bachelor of Arts in Politics and International Relations from the University of Kent. He subsequently obtained a Master of Business Administration (MBA) in Marketing from the University of Buckingham.

== Career ==
Holloway began his career in advertising as an intern at Image Promotions Nigeria Limited, later joining Proximity Communications Nigeria, where he worked on campaigns for brands such as Promasidor Nigeria and Etisalat. He subsequently worked at DDB Lagos as a brand manager, handling accounts for MTN Group, Globe Motors, Martell, and ExxonMobil. He later became the managing director of Evoke Communications Limited, a creative brand consultancy based in Lagos, Nigeria. Before his advertising career, Holloway worked with Stanbic IBTC Holdings and the Lagos State Internal Revenue Service (LIRS).

In March 2024, he was appointed Director General of the National Commission for Museums and Monuments by President Bola Tinubu. Under his leadership, Holloway oversaw the return of 119 Benin Bronzes from the Netherlands to Nigeria. The artifacts, which included bronze plaques, royal regalia, elephant tusks, and ancestral bells, had been taken during the Benin Expedition of 1897. The repatriation marked one of the largest single returns of Benin artifacts to Nigeria.

In September 2026, Holloway was named to TIME magazine's inaugural TIME100 Art list, where he was listed in the Leaders category.

== Personal life ==
Holloway is a polo enthusiast and has served as the honorary secretary of the Lagos Polo Club.
