= National Commission for Museums and Monuments =

Nigerian Museum and Monuments national commission

NCMM
- National Commission for Museums and Monuments
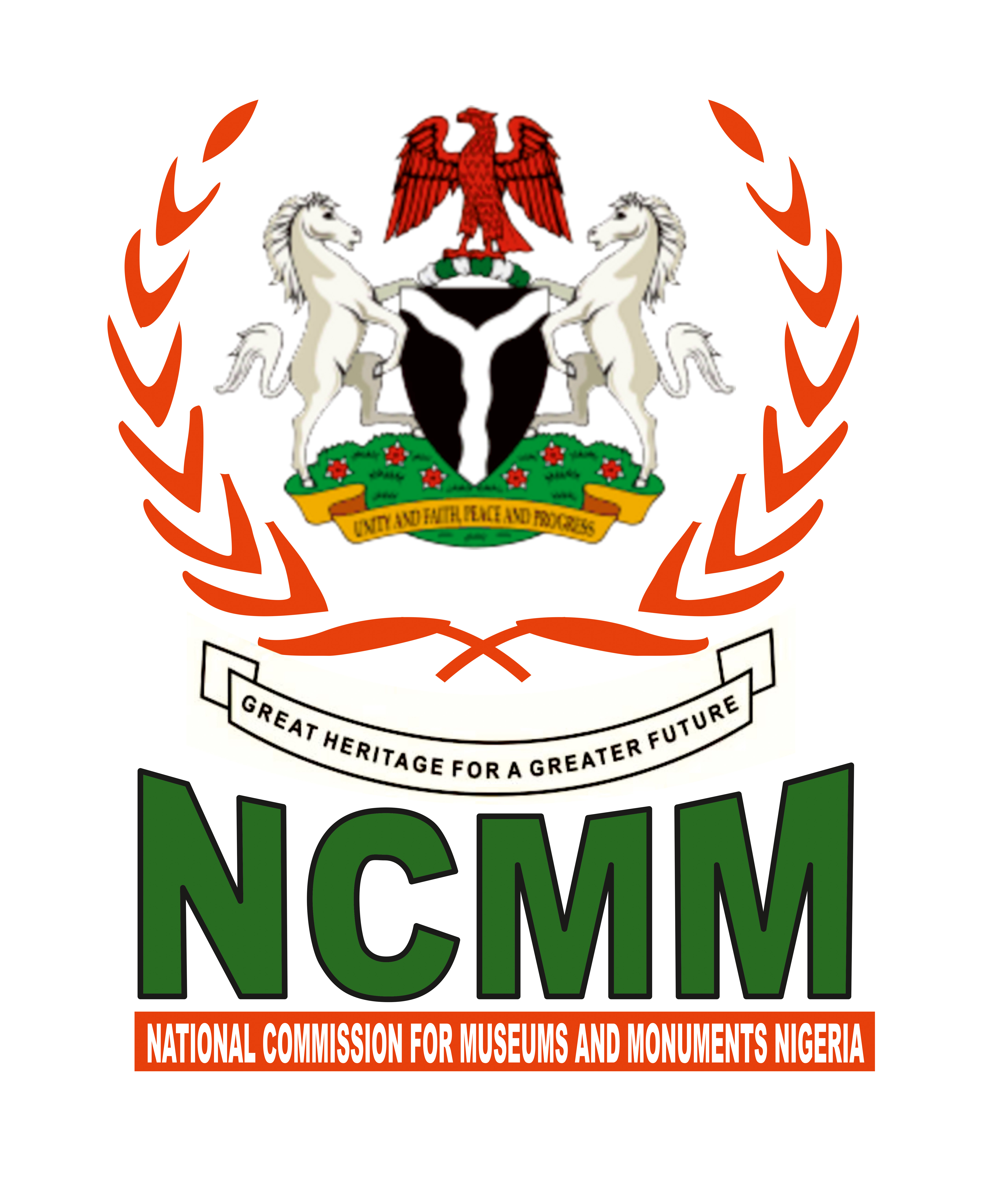
- Formation: September 28, 1979
- Legal status: Museum
- Headquarters: Abuja, Nigeria
- Director-General/CEO: Olugbile Holloway
- Website: museum.ng

The National Commission for Museums and Monuments (NCMM), also referred to as National Museum of Nigeria was Founded in 1979 by the Federal Government of Nigeria with decree 77 of 1979 to be in charge of the collection, documentation, conservation and presentation of the National Cultural properties to the public for the purposes of Education, Enlightenment and Entertainment. The National Commission for Museums and Monuments (NCMM) was promulgated and replaced the National Activities Commissions in its activities. This decree recognized the National Commission for Museums and Monuments as a replacement for both the Federal Department of Antiquities of Nigeria and the Antiquities Commission. The decree has since been substituted in 1990 for the NCMM ACT, CAP 242 of the law of Federal Republic of Nigeria 1990.

== Headquarter and Outlets ==
The National Commission for Museums and Monuments (NCMM) has its headquarters in Abuja, and the commission manages 52 National Museum outlets, 10 libraries, 1 academic institution, 1 zoological garden and 65 Monuments which include historical and architectural landmarks as well as tangible and intangible cultural heritage materials that indicates early civilization on Nigeria. These Fifty (52) National Museum outlets spread across the country, and includes National Museum of Colonial history Aba, National Museum Abakaliki, National Museum Abeokuta, National Museum Akure, National Museum Asaba, National Museum Bauchi, National Museum Benin, National Museum Birnin Kudu, National Museum Calabar, Slave History Museum Calabar, National Museum Damaturu, Museum of National Unity Enugu, National Museum Esie, National Museum Gombe, National Museum Hong, Museum of National Unity Ibadan, National Museum Oko-Surulere, National Museum Igbo-Ukwu, National Museum Ile-Ife, National Museum Ilorin, National Museum Jos, National Museum Kanta, National Museum Kaduna, Gidan Makama National Museum Kano, National Museum Katsina, National Museum Koko, National Museum Lafia, National Museum Lagos, National Museum Lokoja, National Museum Maiduguri, National Museum Makurdi, National Museum Minna, National Museum Nok, National Museum Ogbomosho, National Museum Oron, National Museum Osogbo, National Museum Owerri, National Museum Owo, National Museum Oyo, National Museum Port-Harcourt, National Museum Sokoto, Interpretation Center Sukur, National Museum War Umuahia, National Museum Uyo, National Museum Yenagoa and National Museum Yola.

== Sites managed by NCMM ==
The National Commission for Museums and Monuments (NCMM) also oversee two UNESCO World Heritage Sites namely Osun Osogbo Sacred Grove in Osun state.

== Chief Executive Officer ==
The Director-General/Chief Executive Officer of National Commission for Museums and Monuments (NCMM) is Olugbile Holloway

== List of National Museums ==
S/N	NAME OF MUSEUM	ADDRESS/PHYSICAL LOCATION
1	National Commission for Museums and Monuments, Abuja (Headquarters)	Office of Head of Service, Federal Secretariat Complex, Block C, First Floor, Shehu Shagari Way, Abuja FCT. PMB, 171, Garki – Abuja
2	National Museum of Colonial History, Aba	No. 6 Ikot Ekpene Road, Aba, Abia State.
3	National Museum, Abakaliki	No. 6 St. Patrick Road, Kiriri, Abakaliki, Ebonyi State.
4	National Museum, Abeokuta	Baptist Girls College, Idi-Aba, Abeokuta, Ogun State
5	National Museum, Akure	Opposite Post Office, Oba Adesida Road, Akure, Ondo
6	National Museum, Asaba	Mungo House Park, Asaba, Delta State.
7	Abubakar Tafawa Balewa Mausoleum, Bauchi	Kofar Ran Road, Bauchi, Bauchi State
8	National Museum, Benin	Ring Road, Benin City, Benin City, Edo State
9	Rock Art Interpretive Centre, Birnin- Kudu	Kano-Bauchi Road, Birnin Kudu, Jigawa State
10	National Museum, Calabar	Ekpo Eyo Drive, Calabar, Cross River State
11	Slave History Museum, Calabar	Marina Resort, Calabar, CRS
12	National Museum, Damaturu	Opposite Ben Kadio Housing Estate, Maiduguri Road, Damaturu, Yobe State
13	National Museum of Unity, Enugu	65 Abakaliki Road, Enugu
14	National Museum, Esie	Esie, Kwara State
15	National Museum Gombe	Gombe Federal Secretariat Complex, Gombe City Centre, Gombe State.
16	National Museum, Hong	Local Govt. Secretariat Complex, Hong, Adamawa State
17	Institute of Archaeology & Museum Studies (I.A.M.S)	Opposite Central Bank Parking Space, Jos, Plateau State.
18	National Museum of Unity, Ibadan	Alesinloye Area, Ibadan, Oyo State
19	National Museum ICT Centre, Oko Surulere	National Museum, Oko Surulere, Ogbomosho, Oyo State.
20	National Museum, Igbo-Ukwu	Km. 4, Umudege Ezinifite Road, Igbo-Ukwu, Aguata LGA, Anambra
21	National Museum, Ile-Ife	Enuwa Square, Enuwa Ile-Ife, Osun State
22	National Museum, Ilorin	14 Abdulkadri Road, GRA Ilorin, Kwara State
23	National Museum, Jalingo	Besides Taraba State Ministry of Culture and Tourism, Jalingo
24	National Museum, Jos	Jos, Plateau State
25	National Museum, Kanta	Kanta Museum, Argungu, Kebbi State.
26	Museum of Traditional Nigerian Architecture (MOTNA), Jos	Opposite High Court, Jos Plateau State
27	Zoological Garden, Jos	Opposite Jos Museum Jos Plateau State
28	Centre for Earth Construction Technology (CECTECH)	Opposite Jos Museum, Jos, Plateau State
29	National Museum, Kaduna	No. 33, Ali Akilu Road, Kaduna, Kaduna State
30	Gidan Makama, Museum, Kano	Opposite Emir's Palace, Kano city, Kano State.
31	National Museum, Katsina	Kofa Uku, along Mohamadu Dikko Road, Katsina State.
32	National Museum, Koko	Nana Living Spring Museum, Koko, Delta State
33	National Museum, Lafia	Behind Deputy Governor's Office, Shendam Road, Lafia, Nasarawa State
34	National Museum, Lagos	King George V. Road, Onikan, Lagos State.
35	National Museum of Colonial History, Lokoja	Lokoja, Kogi State.
36	National Museum, Maiduguri	Custom Area, Maiduguri, Maiduguri, Borno State
37	National Museum, Makurdi	GP 4, Ahmadu Bello, Opp. Deputy Governor's Office, Makurdi, Benue State.
38	National Museum, Minna	Federal Secretariat Complex, Minna, Niger State
39	National Museum, Nok	Kwoi-Jaba LGA, Kwoi, Kaduna State.
40	National Museum, Ogbomosho	No. 3 Museum Street, Ogbomoso, Oyo State.
41	National Museum, Oron	Oron, Akwa Ibom State
42	National Museum, Osogbo	Ataoja's Palace, Osogbo, Osun State.
43	National Museum, Owerri	B65 Shell Camp, Off Orlu Road, Owerri Imo State.
44	National Museum, Owo	Olowo's Palace, Owo, Ondo State
45	National Museum, Oyo	No.1 Palace Road, Aafin Oyo, Oyo State
46	National Museum, Port Harcourt	Near No. 2 Hairle Street, Old GRA, Opp Delta Hotel, Port Harcourt, Rivers State.
47	National Museum, Sokoto	Federal Secretariat Complex, Sokoto, Sokoto, Sokoto State.
48	Interpretation Centre, Sukur	Mubi-Maiduguri Road, Sukur, Madagali Local Government, Adamawa State.
49	National War Museum, Umuahia	War Museum Road, Ebite-Amafor, Isingwu by Ugwunchara, Umuahia, Abia State.
50	National Museum, Uyo	Ring Road II, Aka Offot (Behind Ibom Hall), Uyo, Akwa Ibom State.
51	National Museum, Yenagoa	Ijaw House, Sani Abacha Express Way, Yenagoa, Bayelsa State.
52	National Museum, Yola	No. 2 Mohammed, Tukur Road, Off Ahmadu Bello Way, Jimeta, Jimeta-Yola, Adamawa State.

== Listed National Monuments and Heritage Sites ==
Name of object	Created	Location	State	Coordinates	Nr	Photo	Upload
Chief Okoroji's House		Arochukwu	Abia State		Q26235326	Chief Okoroji's House	Upload Photo
Obu House		Elu Ohafia	Abia State		Q26235325	Obu House	Upload Photo
Chief Ochu Kalu's House		Ndi Okerere Abam	Abia State		Q26235324		Upload Photo
Omo Ukwu Of Ndi Nzera Clan Asaga-ohafia		Ohafia	Abia State		Q26235323		Upload Photo
Sukur Cultural Landscape		Madagali	Adamawa State	10°44′26″N 13°34′18″E	Q1123956	more files	Upload Photo
Gidan Madaki In Kafin Madaki		Kafin Madaki	Bauchi State		Q26235321		Upload Photo
Dutsen Damisa Rock Painting		near Gumje	Bauchi State		Q26235320		Upload Photo
Dutsen Zane Geji, Rock Paintings		Toro	Bauchi State		Q26235319		Upload Photo
Shadawanka Rock Paintings		Bauchi	Bauchi State		Q26235318		Upload Photo
Shira Rock Paintings		Shira	Bauchi State		Q26235317		Upload Photo
The Cairn Of Stones at The Foot Of Panshanu Pass, near Mile 31 On The Jos-bauchi Road Known as Kwandonkaya, Toro		Kwandonkaya, Toro	Bauchi State		Q26235316		Upload Photo
First Mining Beacon, Tilden Fulani		Bauchi	Bauchi State		Q26235315		Upload Photo
Tafawa Balewa's Tomb		Bauchi	Bauchi State		Q111522816		Upload Photo
Rabeh’s House and Fort		Dikwa	Borno State		Q26235314		Upload Photo
The Old Residency		Calabar	Cross River State		Q26235312	more files	Upload Photo
The Old Consulate		Calabar	Cross River State		Q26235311		Upload Photo
Chief Egbo Bassey’s House		Calabar	Cross River State		Q26235310	more files	Upload Photo
Carved Stone Monoliths		Alok	Cross River State		Q26235309		Upload Photo
Carved Stone Monoliths		Emaghabe	Cross River State		Q26235308		Upload Photo
Palace Of Chief Nanna Of Koko		Koko	Delta State		Q26235307	more files	Upload Photo
Chief Ogiamen’s House		Benin City	Edo State		Q26235306		Upload Photo
Chief Aikoriogie’s House, Enogie Of Obazagbon		Obazangbo	Edo State		Q26235305		Upload Photo
Benin City Walls and Moat		Benin City	Edo State		Q26235304		Upload Photo
Chief Nwokolo’s House		Ukehe	Enugu State		Q26235303		Upload Photo
Rock Paintings at Dutsen Habude		Birnin Kudu	Jigawa State		Q26235302		Upload Photo
Rock Inscriptions, Gong and Shelter at Dutsen Mesa		Birnin Kudu	Jigawa State		Q26235301		Upload Photo
Rock Paintings at Dutsen Murufu		Birnin Kudu	Jigawa State		Q26235300		Upload Photo
Rock Paintings at Dutsen Zango		Birnin Kudu	Jigawa State		Q26235299		Upload Photo
Zaria City Walls		Zaria	Kaduna State		Q26235298		Upload Photo
Kufena Hills		near Zaria	Kaduna State		Q26235297	more files	Upload Photo
Steel Foot Bridge, built by Frederick Lugard		Kaduna	Kaduna State		Q26235296	more files	Upload Photo
Habe Mosque		Maigana	Kaduna State		Q26235295		Upload Photo
Habe Mosque		Bebeji	Kano State		Q26235294		Upload Photo
Gidan Makama		Kano	Kano State	11°59′20″N 8°31′16″E	Q5559489	more files	Upload Photo
Kano City Walls and Gate		Kano	Kano State		Q26235293	more files	Upload Photo
Gobarau Minaret		Katsina	Katsina State	12°59′53″N 7°35′44″E	Q5575409	Gobarau Minaret	Upload Photo
The Tumuli and Baobab Tree Known as Durbi-Takusheyi		Katsina	Katsina State		Q26235292		Upload Photo
Old Katsina Training College		Katsina	Katsina State		Q26235291		Upload Photo
Ojogwu Atogwu Tumulus near The Palace Of The Attah Of Idah		Idah	Kogi State		Q26235290		Upload Photo
Relics Of The Steamer “Dayspring”		Jebba Hydroelectric Power Station	Kwara State		Q26235289		Upload Photo
Old West African Frontier Force Fort		Okuta	Kwara State		Q26235287		Upload Photo
Old West African Frontier Force Fort		Yashikera	Kwara State		Q26235286		Upload Photo
Stone Figures		Ofaro	Kwara State		Q26235285		Upload Photo
Stone Figures		Ijara	Kwara State		Q26235284		Upload Photo
Ilojo Bar		Lagos Island	Lagos State		Q26235283	more files	Upload Photo
Iga Idunganran (Oba's Old Palace)		Lagos Island	Lagos State		Q3456596	more files	Upload Photo
Water House		Lagos Island	Lagos State		Q26235282	more files	Upload Photo
Old Secretariat		Marina	Lagos State		Q26235281	more files	Upload Photo
Tsoede's Tomb		Gwagwade	Niger State		Q26235279		Upload Photo
Site Of Mai Jimina's House		Wushishi	Niger State		Q26235278		Upload Photo
Ruins and Site Of Colonial Government House		Zungeru	Niger State		Q26235277		Upload Photo
The Katamba Of The Palace Of Etsu Nupe, Mohammed		Bida	Niger State		Q26235276		Upload Photo
Chief Sungbo's Shrine		Oke-eri, near Ijebu-Ode	Ogun State		Q26235275		Upload Photo
Igbara Oke Petroglyphs		near Igbara-oke	Ondo State		Q26235274	more files	Upload Photo
The Old Palace Of The Deji Of Akure		Akure	Ondo State		Q26235273	more files	Upload Photo
River-side Shrine and Sacred Grove Of Oshun		Osogbo	Osun State	7°45′20″N 4°33′08″E	Q621498	more files	Upload Photo
Shrine Of Oshun In The King's Market		Osogbo	Osun State		Q26235272	more files	Upload Photo
Shrine Of Oshun at the Afin Ataoja (palace)		Osogbo	Osun State		Q26235271	more files	Upload Photo
Ita Yemoo		Ile-ife	Osun State		Q26235270		Upload Photo
Carved Stone Figure		Igbajo	Osun State		Q26235269		Upload Photo
Stone Causeway		Batura, Bokkos	Plateau State		Q26235268		Upload Photo
Stone Causeway		Forof, Bokkos	Plateau State		Q26235267	more files	Upload Photo
Stone Causeway		Tading, Bokkos	Plateau State		Q26235266	more files	Upload Photo
King Jaja of Opobo Memorial	1903	Opobo	Rivers State	4°30′51″N 7°32′20″E	Q26235265	more files	Upload Photo
Ruins Of Ancient City Of Surame		Surame	Sokoto State	13°05′15″N 4°53′55″E	Q201345		Upload Photo
