= Lugard Footbridge =

Bridge in Zungeru, Northern Nigeria, Nigeria

Coordinates: 10°30′19″N 7°27′13″E

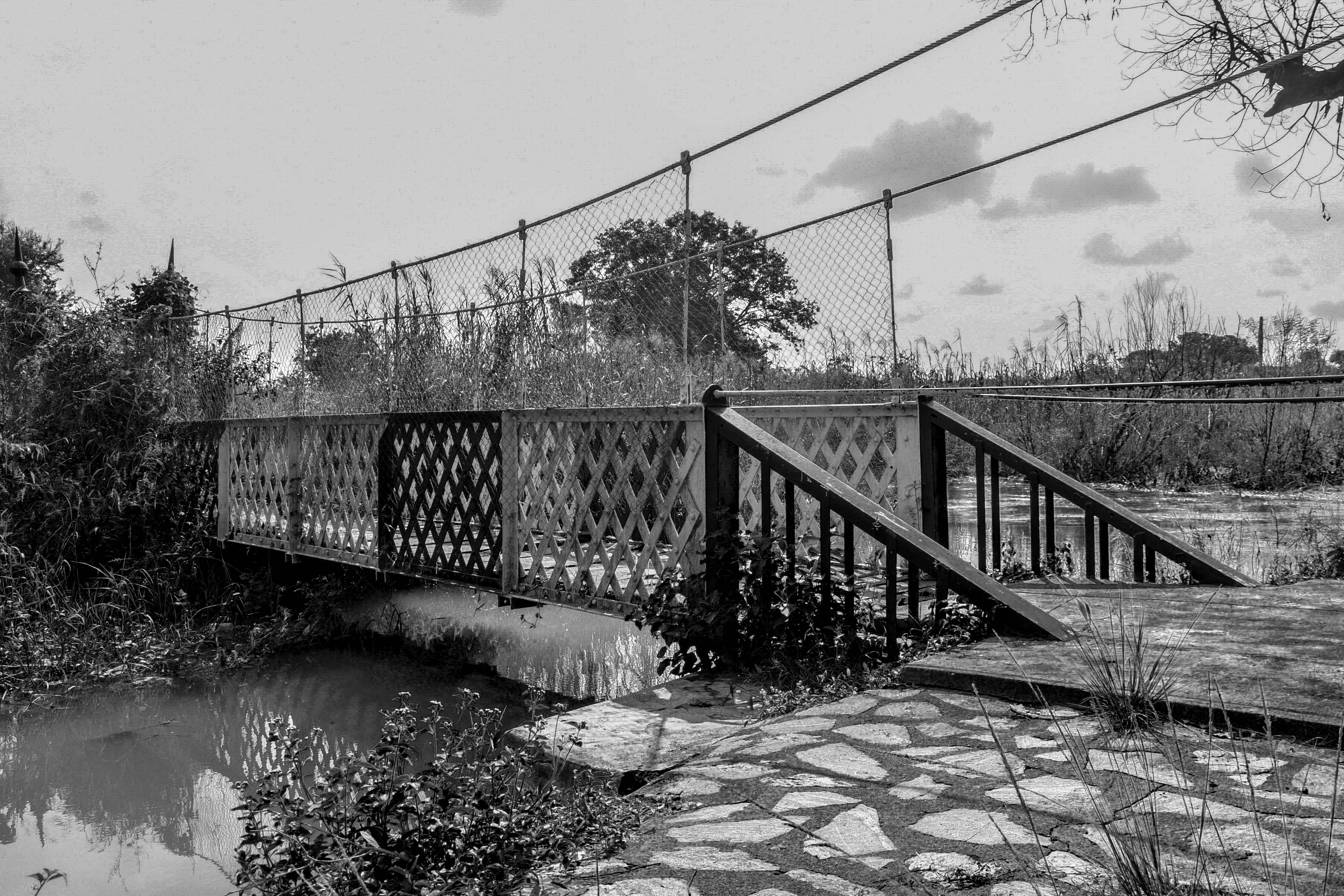

The Lugard Footbridge is a pedestrian bridge located in Kaduna, the capital of Kaduna State, Nigeria.

== History ==
It was built by Sir Frederick Lugard in 1904 at Zungeru, the capital of the Northern Protectorate of Nigeria. After the amalgamation of the Northern and Southern Protectorates, the bridge was reconstructed in 1920 after it was moved to Gamji Gate in Kaduna, which at the time served as the new Northern Headquarters. On 16 February 1956, the National Commission for Museums and Monuments declared the footbridge a historic monument.

== Structure ==
Presently located in the General Hassan Katsina Park, Kaduna, the Lugard Footbridge is made up of iron with other complementing features including handrails and wire gauze while beams, two pillars, girders and concrete are for structural strength and balance. With its length and width at 14.2m and 1.75m respectively, the footbridge is made up of 42 wooden steps with its deck and pillar painted green and white.
