= Ife National Museum =

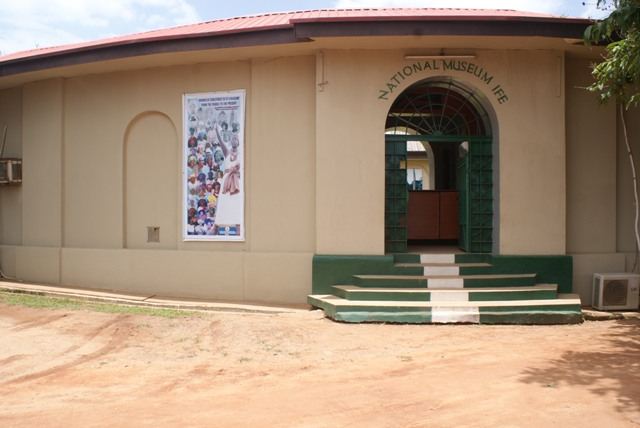
- Museum facade in 2013
- Established: 1954; 72 years ago
- Location: Near to Ooni's Palace, Enuwa Area, Central Ile-Ife, Nigeria
- Coordinates: 7.482654°N 4.559859°E
- Type: Ethnographic and Archeological Museum

The Ife National Museum is a museum located in Osun State, Nigeria. The museum exhibits objects from ancient Ife, some of these objects are made of terracotta or bronze. The museum is administered by the National Commission for Museums and Monuments of Nigeria.

== History ==
The museum is in a circular building of colonial architecture that was built in 1948. The museum was opened to the public in 1954. Some of the museum's artifacts were stolen between April 1993 and November 1994. Among the objects that were stolen from the museum were three terracotta heads, which were recovered in France and returned to Nigeria in 1996. In 1938, a carved portrait heads were found, these were created by the Yoruba people, most of these artifacts were exhibited in the museum, although some were taken out of Nigeria, this caused the Nigerian government to impose a stricter control with respect to the antiquities.

== Collections ==
The museum contains archaeological collections, such as metal objects and human remains. The museum also contains ethnographic objects such as traditional clothing and leather bags. The museum contains stone sculptures and terracotta heads. Parts of the museum's sculptures date back to the 13th century. The museum contains a collection of brass heads from Ife, which were unearthed in 1938. The museum has juju items, spiritual belief system incorporating objects used in West Africa. The museum contains Gẹlẹdẹ masks, these were found during 1954, around Ife. Among the artifacts that the museum has are traditional objects used by the Yoruba people in daily life, such as cushions called Timutimus, native fans called Abebes, scabbards called Ako, earthenware pots, knives, shoes, in addition to native medicine belts. (Igbadi). Some of the heads made of wood and bronze have their mouths gagged, according to the ethnographer, Mathew Ogunmola, this would represent the slaves who were killed in different sanctuaries.
