= Ujari =

Village in Abia State, Nigeria

Ujari is a small village located in Arochukwu, Abia State, Nigeria. The Okoroji House Museum is located there and its postal code is 442101.
