= Rabeh =

Rabeh رعبه
- Village
- Country: Iran
- Province: Kerman
- County: Kerman
- Bakhsh: Central
- Rural District: Ekhtiarabad

Population (2006)
  - Total: 26
- Time zone: UTC+3:30 (IRST)

Rabeh (Persian: رعبه, also Romanized as Raʿbeh) is a village in Ekhtiarabad Rural District, in the Central District of Kerman County, Kerman Province, Iran. At the 2006 census, its population was 26, in seven families.
