= Esiẹ =

- City
- Location in Nigeria
- Coordinates: 8°12′N 4°53′E
- Country: Nigeria
- State: Kwara State
- LGA: Irepodun
- Time zone: UTC+1 (WAT)

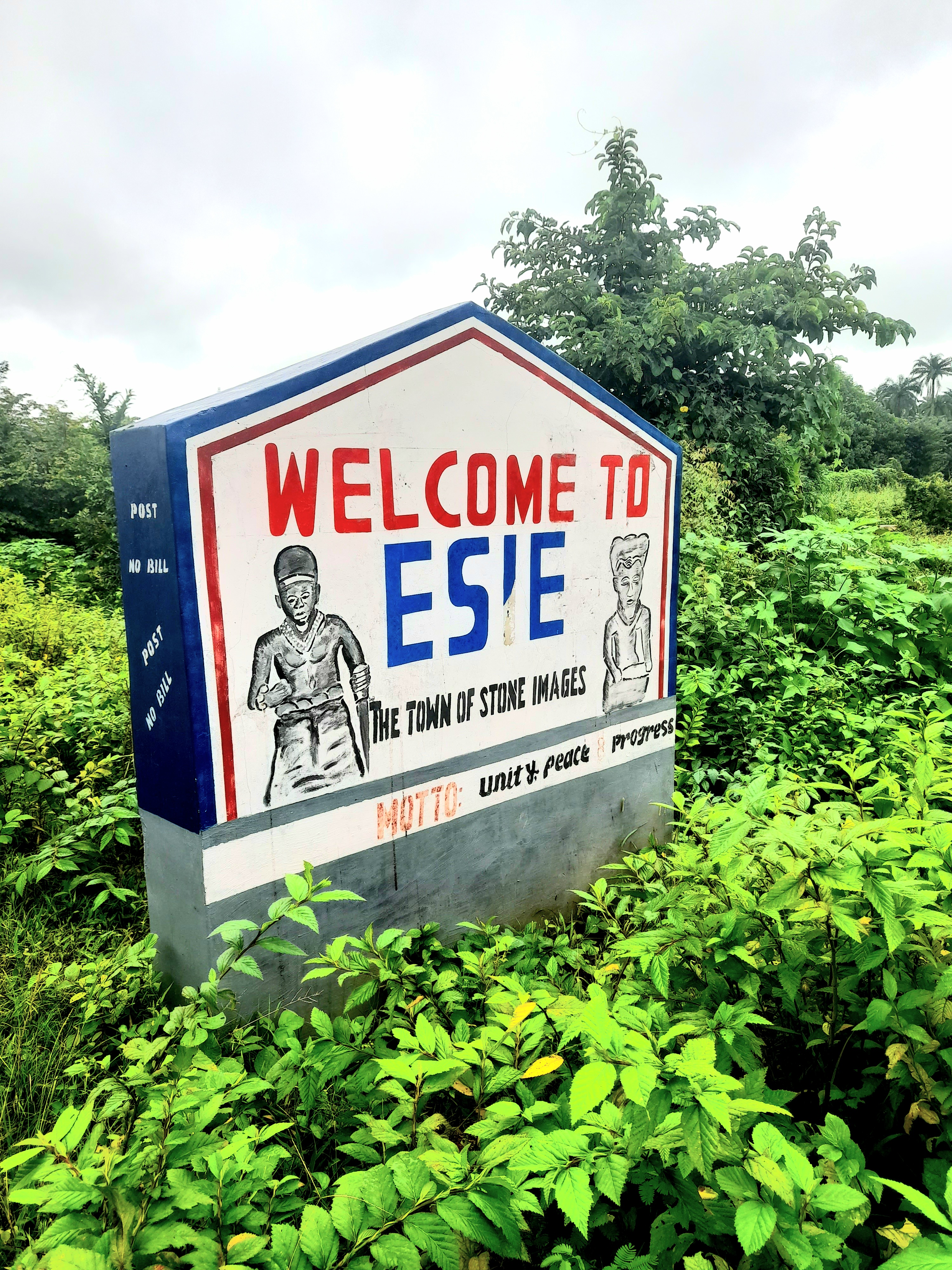
Welcome to Esie billboard

Esiẹ is a town in Kwara State in Nigeria.

== History ==
The town was founded by Prince Baragbon c. 1770. The dialect of Yoruba spoken in Esiẹ is predominantly Igbonna. The town has a king who is Oba Yakubu Babalola Egunjobi II.

== Attractions ==
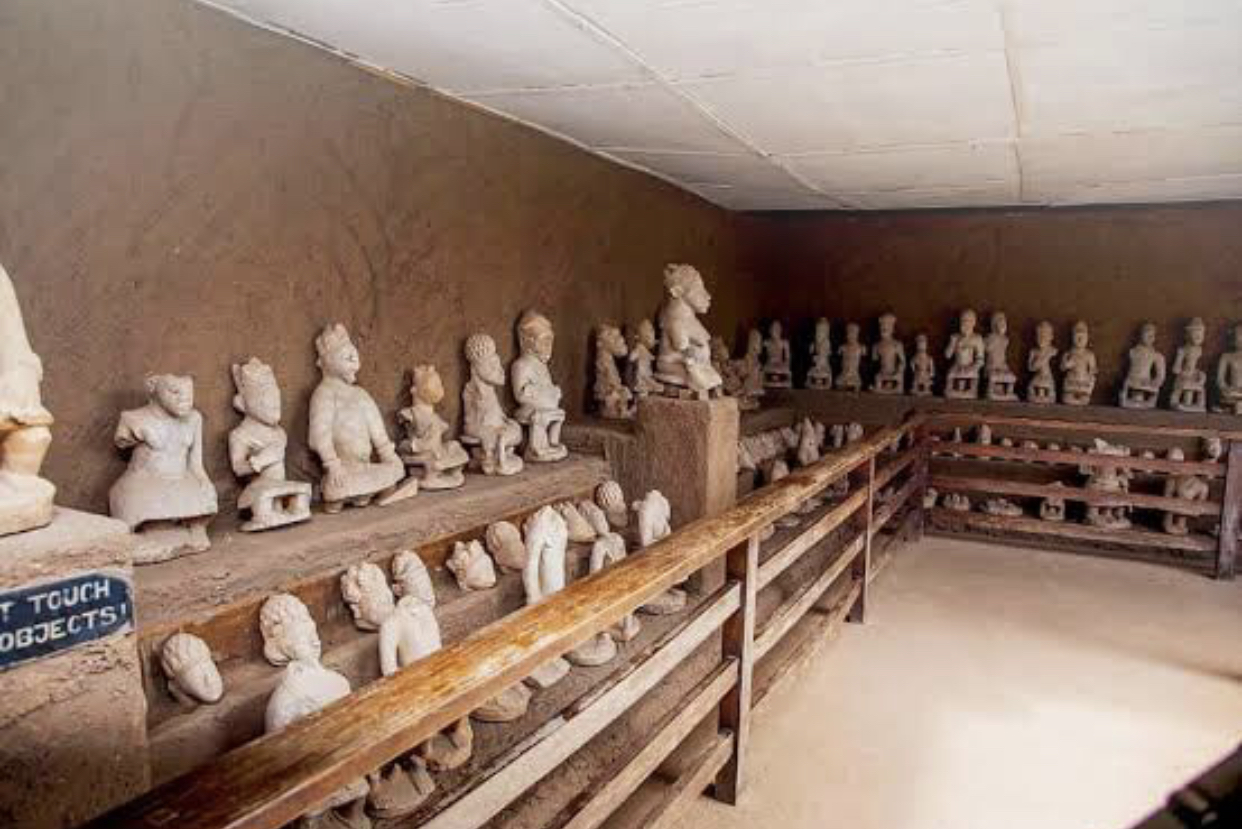
ESIE MUSEUM

It is home to the Esiẹ Museum which was the first museum to be established in Nigeria.
