= Esiẹ Museum =

Nigeria museum

- Established: 1945
- Location: Esiẹ, Kwara State, Nigeria
- Coordinates: 8.1963283°N 4.8882082°E

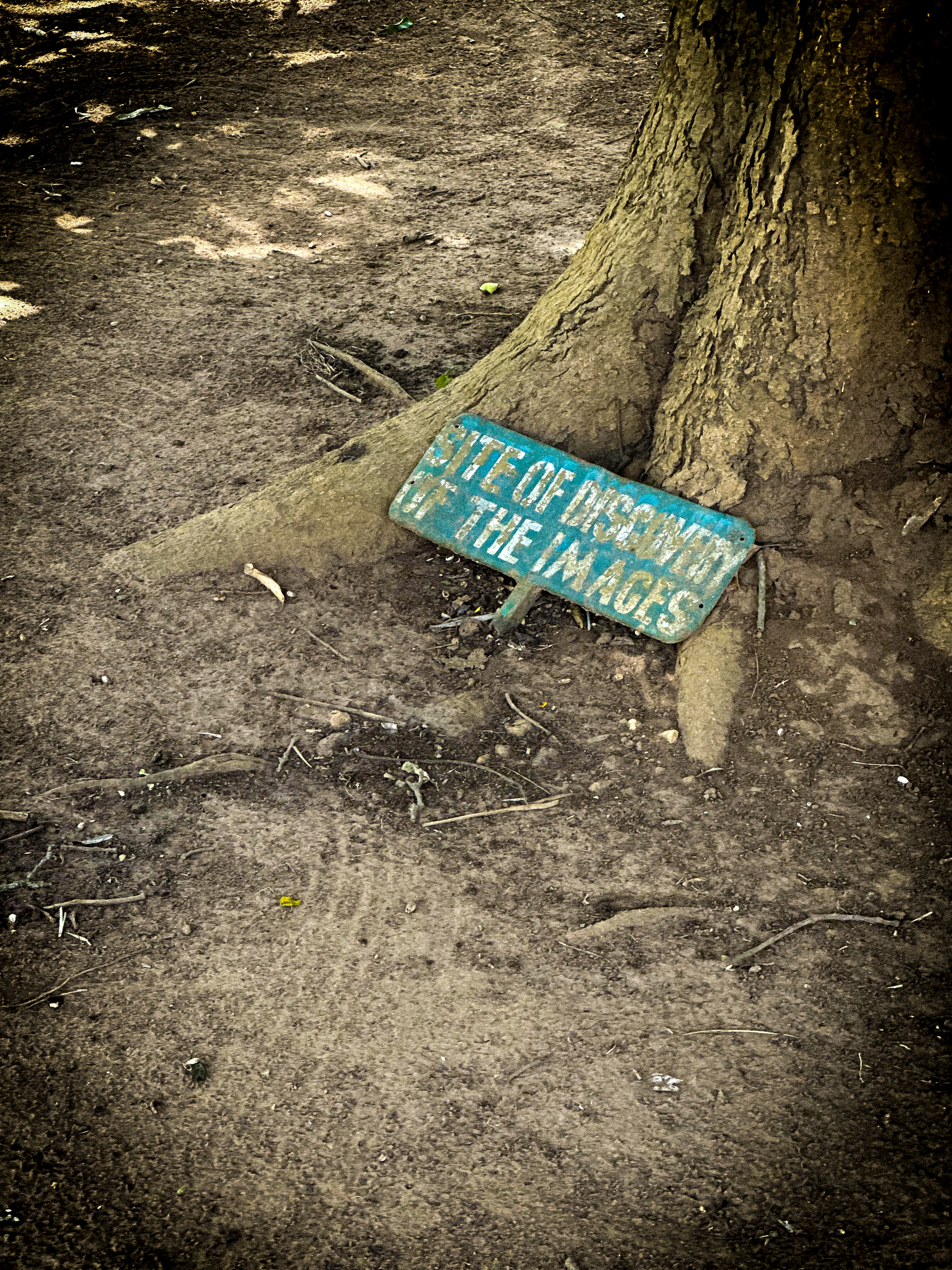
This is the tree underneath which all the stone images in Esiẹ were discovered.

Esiẹ Museum is a museum in Esiẹ, Kwara State, Nigeria.

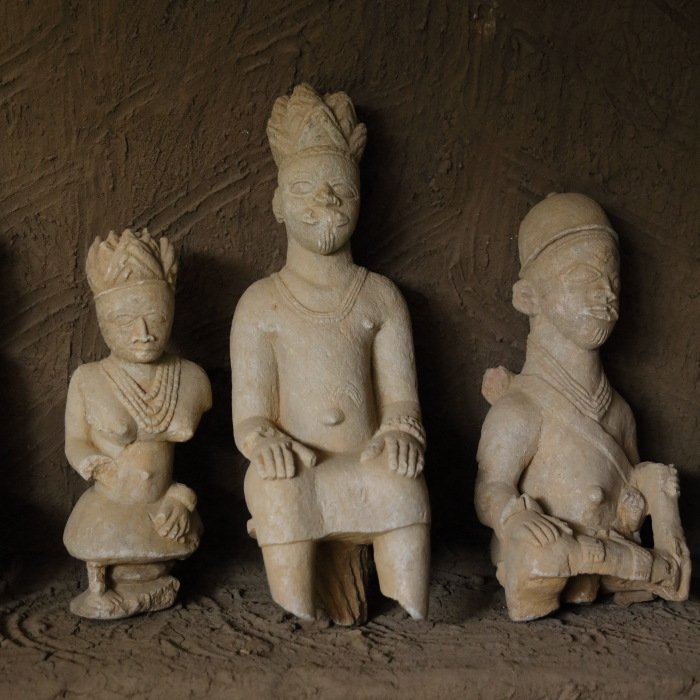
In the sleepy Igbomina town of Esie, in Irepodun LGA Kwara State lays the first museum in Nigeria. The museum was established in 1945 to house one of the greatest treasures ever bequeathed to mankind, Esie Stone Images (Ere Esie).

The museum was the first to be established in Nigeria when it opened in 1945. The museum once housed over one thousand tombstone figures or images representing human beings.

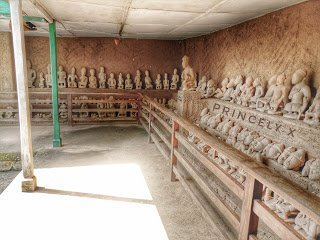
Esie museum established 1945 is located in Irepodun LGA of Kwara State. The museum is known for housing human-shaped stone figures.

It is reputed to have the largest collection of soapstone images in the world. In modern times the Esie museum has been the center of religious activities and hosts a festival in the month of April every year.

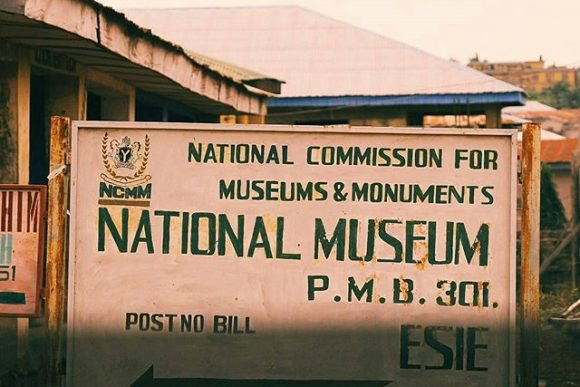

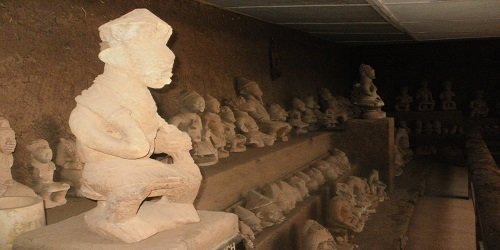
Popular myth had it that in years back the residents of the town committed a grave offence and thunderstruck turning the people into stones.
