= Benin City National Museum =

Museum in Nigeria

- Location: Ring Road, Benin City, Nigeria.
- Coordinates: 6.3329°N 5.6222°E
- Collections: The museum has a significant number of artifacts related to the Benin Empire such as terracotta, bronze figures and cast iron pieces

The Benin City National Museum is a national museum in Benin City, Nigeria, located in the city centre on King's Square. The museum has a significant number of artifacts related to the Benin Empire such as terracotta, bronze figures and cast iron pieces. It also has ancient art related to the early times.

The National Museum, Benin City was opened to the public in 1973. It is managed by the National Commission for Museums and Monuments (NCMM), an agency of the Federal Government of Nigeria responsible for the preservation, promotion and development of Nigeria's cultural heritage.

== Location ==
The Benin City National Museum is situated at a place called Ring road which used to be called King’s Square by the people of Benin, but it was changed to Oba Ovonramwen Square by Comrade Adams Oshiomhole during his tenure as a governor of the state.
