= List of villages in Kwara State =

This is a list of villages and settlements in Kwara State, Nigeria organised by local government area (LGA) and district/area (with postal codes also given).

== By postal code ==
LGA	District / Area	Postal code	Villages
Asa	Afon	240104	Abayawa; Abeokuta; Abidi Ore; Abio; Abokede; Abote Alfa; Aboto Afon; Aboto Alfa; Aboto-Oja; Aboyi Ode; Aboyi Olokole; Abuyabirin; Abuyanrin Abasi; Abuyanrin Afa; Adabata; Adinimole; Afeyi; Afeyin; Afon; Agboyi; Agboyi Alagbade; Agboyi Eleja; Agboyi Idiope; Ago-Oja; Agoro; Aho Alabe; Aiekale (Odo-Ode); Airport; Aiyede; Aiyekale; Aiyekale Olola; Aiyetoro; Ajagun; Ajagunsi; Ajara; Ajegunle; Ajelanwa; Ajila; Akara Kajola; Akumadu; Akumaju; Alabata; Aladere; Aladere Alayo; Alagbede; Alagbon; Alaja-Adigun; Alaja-Aiyetoro; Alapako Iju; Alata; Alatan; Alawon; Aleniboro; Aleyo; Aloba; Alopako Etile; Apa; Apata; Apata Aje; Arogun; Arowosaiye; Arunde; Asorope; Awimose; Bayi; Bello Irra; Budo Aagun; Budo Abasi; Budo Abogonbo; Budo Abogun; Budo Afa Ajadi; Budo Aiku; Budo Ajibade; Budo Alagbe; Budo Alagi; Budo Alase; Budo Alfa; Budo Alfa Ajadi; Budo Aro; Budo Awero; Budo Egba; Budo Esin; Budo Giwa; Budo Igboto; Budo Ilorin; Budo Kankan; Budo Koko; Budo Lanro; Budo Layemo; Budo Nla; Budo Ogun; Budo Ojoku; Budo Ojuku; Budo Ole; Budo Orogun; Budo Oru; Budo Owode; Budo Sakam; Dadi Gaa; Dadi Ite; Egbejila; Egbon; Egbon Tomori Lasoju; Eiyenkorin; Elega; Eleke; Eleko; Elemula; Elepo; Elewure; Eleyele; Eri-Oke; Eru-Oba; Eruobodo; Faa Afon; Faa Aleyo; Faa Sambe; Falokun; Foke; Foko; Fufu; Gaa Apa; Gaa Badanwaki; Gaa Igboroko; Gaa Imam Isale; Gaa Imam Oke; Gaa Kudu; Gaa Mamudu; Gaa Oba; Gaa Sule; Galadimon; Gambaro; Gbagba; Gbaja; Gbale Asun; Gbego; Gbiyeye; Gbobi Araro; Idi Egun; Idi-Agbon; Idi-Emi; Iganna; Igbaunda; Igberi; Igberi Oko; Igbo Aran; Igbo Ede; Igbo Kurange; Igbo Oja; Igboho; Igbole; Igbon Igbin; Igboro-Oke; Igboroko Beye Aram; Igboroko-Isale; Ikeso; Ila; Ila Ija; Ilaji Garuba; Ipetu; Ipetu Nla; Irede; Ita Alamu; Iwonte; Jaju Gbagede; Joro; Joromo; Kajola; Kanlao; Kawu; Kongu; Koroke; Laduba; Lanle; Lasoju; Majire; Majodi; Mejiro; Mogaji; Mojodi; Momo; Monjaodi; Mosadi Olorun; Obata; Obate; Odo Aho; Odo ta; Odo-Ode; Odo-Omo; Odore; Ofin Anda; Ogare; Ogbiri Gidi; Ogbondoroko; Ogele; Ogodo; Ogunlore; Oguntoyinbo; Oke Afon; Okeso; Okete; Oko Erin; Olofe; Ologbo; Oloka; Olokiti; Oloko Nla; Olokoto; Olokoto Eleye; Olola; Ololore; Olomoda; Oloro; Olorunda; Olowo Abe; Olowo Oko; Olulade; Olupe; Olusi; Omi Doyin; Omole; Oni Fufu; Onibo; Oniboyin; Onigbo; Oniguguru; Onipanpe; Onirin; Oniyere; Onyangi; Ooromo; Opakusa; Opette; Oriho; Osere; Osin; Osin Agaka; Osin Alagbako; Osin Aremu; Osin Atapa; Osin Budo Are; Osin Budo Idi Emi; Osin Budo Kawu; Osin Budo Oba; Osin Olokoto; Otte; Otte Egba; Otte-Oko; Owode; Owode-Pampo; Pampo; Pandoro; Rago; Raufu; Reke; Sama; Samoh; Sap; Sapati Ile; Sapati Oko; Saw Mill Odokun; Senga; Sholu; Sokoto; Sun; Suta; Takoro; Tapo; Temidire; Yakoyo; Yiddo
Asa	Onire	240106	Abiowa; Adi Gbongbo; Agbolu-Oke; Agbona; Alapa; Alapa Cetre; Alapata; Aminu; Awe; Ayegunle; Boduwu; Budo Abemi Seni; Budo Adan; Budo Adari; Budo Adedeji; Budo Adejo-Are; Budo Adeko; Budo Adeogun; Budo Adijale; Budo Adio; Budo Adisatu; Budo Afon; Budo Agbedagbin; Budo Agbolu; Budo Agbona Keke; Budo Agbonna; Budo Agoke; Budo Agor; Budo Ahoro; Budo Ajaere; Budo Ajanaku; Budo Aje Gunle; Budo Ajelanwa; Budo Ajeleye; Budo Ajemogba; Budo Ajimasin; Budo Akeru Ojaya; Budo Akodudu; Budo Akokoyo; Budo Alaba; Budo Aladere; Budo Alagbede; Budo Alagogo; Budo Alagua; Budo Alagunga; Budo Alaje; Budo Alakawa; Budo Alake; Budo Alakuko; Budo Alapa Koro; Budo Alapansanpa; Budo Alapasanpa; Budo Alapete; Budo Alaro; Budo Alasso; Budo Alate; Budo Alawodi; Budo Alayidan; Budo Aloba; Budo Aloro Aladie; Budo Alu-Bello; Budo Alu-Kupola; Budo Alu-Salawu; Budo Alufa Onire; Budo Alugbejo; Budo Amalegbe; Budo Apakoko; Budo Apata; Budo Apere; Budo Apoya; Budo Aragba; Budo Arake; Budo Araro; Budo Are; Budo Aro; Budo Asa; Budo Asare Ola; Budo Aseseru; Budo Ashi Omani; Budo Asogba; Budo Asunara; Budo Atiku; Budo Atu; Budo Awenla; Budo Ayansan; Budo Aye; Budo Ayekale Aho; Budo Ayekale Elere; Budo Baba Aloke; Budo Baba Egbe; Budo Baba Kere; Budo Bababudo; Budo Bale Agbe; Budo Banni; Budo Banni Elegusi; Budo Bina; Budo Bokose; Budo Busamu; Budo Dana Ogun; Budo Debi-Ola; Budo Ekewu; Budo Elebenla; Budo Elega; Budo Elegusi; Budo Elehoro; Budo Elehu; Budo Eleku; Budo Elepo; Budo Eleran; Budo Elere; Budo Elero; Budo Elewure; Budo Elewure Yahaya; Budo Enkule; Budo Esa Nla; Budo Faa Jiwa Olodo; Budo Faje; Budo Gaa Mayan; Budo Gbajuma; Budo Gboroko; Budo Gere; Budo Goronje; Budo Gunbunmi; Budo Hanafi; Budo Idakureku; Budo Idi Agbede; Budo Idi Ose-Olomu; Budo Idi-Ose-Ogboru; Budo Idiapa; Budo Idiapa-Ode; Budo Idiya; Budo Igbo Alakun; Budo Igbo-Efon; Budo Igbonna Keke; Budo Igbonna Nla; Budo Igboroko Keke; Budo Ijara; Budo Ikere; Budo Ikugbagbe; Budo Ireke-Igbo-Ayin; Budo Iya Budo Iyana; Budo Iya-Yan; Budo Iyana Igbeti; Budo Iyana Lakuko; Budo Jania; Budo Jawe; Budo Jenkunnu; Budo Jeunkunnu; Budo Jimo; Budo Juwa Olowo; Budo Kandoro Aleru; Budo Kangu; Budo Kodokodo; Budo Kolofo; Budo Kondoro Elere; Budo Kondoro Orioko; Budo Kondoro Yusuf; Budo Kosigi; Budo Koto; Budo Kunbi-Arare; Budo Kupola; Budo Labinta; Budo Labintan; Budo Ladajude; Budo Ladani; Budo Laodu; Budo Larewaju; Budo Layeri; Budo Maliki; Budo Nadala; Budo Nasiru; Budo Obada; Budo Obanisua; Budo Obate; Budo Obate I; Budo Obate II; Budo Ode Giwa; Budo Odoru; Budo Odosun; Budo Odunjo; Budo Ogunbo; Budo Ogundeji; Budo Ogunlomo; Budo Ogunniyi; Budo Ojaya; Budo Ojugbede; Budo Okepete; Budo Okoh; Budo Okon; Budo Okubiyi; Budo Okuta Pete; Budo Olobe; Budo Olodo; Budo Ologede; Budo Ologiri; Budo Ologun; Budo Ologuro; Budo Olojaka; Budo Olope; Budo Olori Alangua; Budo Oloronbo; Budo Olose-Meji; Budo Olowo; Budo Olowo Abata; Budo Oloyede; Budo Olupo; Budo Onigbingbo .A; Budo Onigbo; Budo Onikangu; Budo Onikasan; Budo Onikoko; Budo Onilaru; Budo Onile Aropa; Budo Onipako; Budo Onire; Budo Onire Buhari; Budo Oniso; Budo Oniyeye; Budo Onle Aro; Budo Onopako; Budo Opepete Bada; Budo Operepete Oni; Budo Ormare; Budo Osagbolu; Budo Otta; Budo Owode; Budo Owode Adikutu; Budo Oyaya Araro; Budo Passa; Budo Ponpola; Budo Rasaki; Budo Retere; Budo Saaku Goje; Budo Seseru; Budo Sosoki; Budo Takan Ile; Budo Tapa; Budo Tiro; Budo Umaru Arare; Budo Werijo; Budo Yede; Budo Yede Atanda; Budo Yeye Olobi; Daji; Diyepe; Elebue; Elewure Yahaya; Gaa Adio; Gaa Adunjo; Gaa Aho; Gaa Alagangan; Gaa Alagba; Gaa Alapata; Gaa Alawiye; Gaa Aree; Gaa Ashi Omani; Gaa Ashi Pele; Gaa Asi Kondoro Larin; Gaa Asunkinkin; Gaa Ayu; Gaa Baako; Gaa Banni; Gaa Dana Ogun; Gaa Elepo; Gaa Fatta; Gaa Goronje; Gaa Idakureku; Gaa Idiose; Gaa Igbonla; Gaa Ijana; Gaa Ile Kofo; Gaa Jowuro; Gaa Kolofo; Gaa Labintan Audu; Gaa Lalu-Oke; Gaa Lamba; Gaa Lambe; Gaa Ogundede; Gaa Olalekan; Gaa Olloh; Gaa Olorunbo; Gaa Olumoh; Gaa Onikeke; Gaa Onipako; Gaa Onire; Gaa Oniyan; Gaa Oniyangi; Gaa Otun Ago; Gaa Paku; Gaa Ponpola; Gaa Sabi Adamu; Gaa Sanni Olose; Gaa Turawa; Gungunmi; Igbonna Keke; Isale; Lanba; Niyamo; Onire; Sosoko; Yowere
Asa	Owode	240105	Adafila; Afon; Agu; Aiyede; Aiyegun Ballah; Akopiri; Akute; Akuyun; Alaba; Alagbede; Alugbede; Apata; Apo; Babadudu; Ballah; Budo Abanisina; Budo Abogun; Budo Abuyanrin; Budo Adabata; Budo Adinimole; Budo Agba; Budo Agbege; Budo Age Iju; Budo Agunbelewe; Budo Aiyede; Budo Aiyekale; Budo Aiyekirin; Budo Ajape; Budo Ajegunle Alafe; Budo Ajokode; Budo Ajugba Owu; Budo Ajuwon; Budo Akogbin; Budo Alagbede; Budo Alagogo; Budo Alaka Pupa; Budo Alapa; Budo Alaparo; Budo Alate; Budo Alhaji; Budo Aloba; Budo Alodo; Budo Alogun; Budo Amugba; Budo Apa-Okagi; Budo Aparo; Budo Apere; Budo Araromi; Budo Aribi; Budo Arologun; Budo Aroye; Budo Aroyunjo; Budo Asa Dab; Budo Atere; Budo Atu; Budo Awero; Budo Ba-Akefa; Budo Baba Alaso Opo; Budo Baba Ayinde; Budo Baba-Ikudu; Budo Badiko; Budo Bale; Budo Balogun Isale; Budo Berikofo; Budo Budo Awero; Budo Daudu; Budo Efue; Budo Efue Isale; Budo Elejenla; Budo Eleran; Budo Elere; Budo Elesin; Budo Elete; Budo Elewure; Budo Fakoyi; Budo Gaa Amadu; Budo Gaa Wara; Budo Gambari; Budo Gbakan; Budo Gbena Akanbi; Budo Gbogun; Budo Gerewu; Budo Idisin; Budo Igbonala; Budo Igbonna Oke; Budo Iho Aminu; Budo Iho Yufus; Budo Ijesha; Budo Imalefe Alafia; Budo Inda; Budo Isale Awe; Budo Iyan; Budo Iyanda Ogbena; Budo Iyanwole; Budo Jagun; Budo Jombo; Budo Kajere; Budo Kanmihun; Budo Keredolu; Budo Konipa; Budo Kuo-Amadu; Budo Laomi; Budo Lasoju; Budo Madi; Budo Makotun; Budo Obafe Rufai; Budo Ogbena Kadiri; Budo Ogbin; Budo Ogidi; Budo Ogundele; Budo Oju Taiye; Budo Oke Aye; Budo Olodo Ogbena; Budo Oloja; Budo Olorunda; Budo Olowo Elekan; Budo Olugbo; Budo Orogbangba; Budo Osekutana; Budo Otte-rere; Budo Oyanlu; Budo Pampo; Budo Popo; Budo Sara; Budo Sokoto; Budo Tanbo; Budo Tanliko; Budo Tatta; Budo Temidire; Budo Temidire Uban; Budo Tope; Budo Tuntun; Budo Wara; Budo Wodina; BudoTafa-Tafa; BudoYakajo; BudoYanma; Butubutu; Dongari; Edo Are; Elere; Eleyele; Elo-Ekiwe; Epupu; Etile; Faje; Gaa Aiyede; Gaa Jombo; Gbadu; Gbokedu; Idibo; Igbo-Onlu; Isara; Iyan Wole; Kagode; Mokotun; Ogidi; Ojala; Oluwale; Owode; Owude Oja; Saka; Tapa; Temidire
Baruten	Gwanara	242105	Bioweite; Didi Umaru Buran; Gbezei Buran; Gomme Likita; Gwanara; Hannda Woma Buran; Haruna Buran; Hassan Bandawaki; Hassan Buran; Hussaminin Buran; Ibrahim Woma Buran; Ibrahim Wukuji; Ibrahim Zamari; Idiris Bako Buran; Idisin Buran; Idisu Buran; Igbogi; Igbori Buran; Iya Egbe Buran; Kaina; Kemanji; Kuhiaro; Magaji; Mahuta; Maigida; Mohammedu Buran; Monna Buran; Moshe; Moshe Bio Sgebe; Sabi Loru Buran; Sabi Manga Buran; Sabi Suya Buran; Sabi Uwa Be; Sabi Woke Buran; Saidu Buran; Sakin Samar Buran; Sale Buran; Sarilic Be; Sebo; Shirigwaria; Sidi Gaku Buran; Sorere; Sulaima Buran; Sule Buran; Sumaji; Sumazi Gamp; Taimako; Taru Absesare Buran; Tenedy; Tenten; Teri Bura; Teshe; Teshe Nahu; Tori Gandu; Tungan Aboki; Tungan Ademu; Tungan Alh. Baduku; Tungan Alh. Ilorin; Tungan Alh. Wote; Tungan Alh. Yusuf; Tungan Alha; Tungan Ango Bata; Tungan Audu; Tungan Bana-za; Tungan Basadito; Tungan Bature; Tungan Bawa; Tungan Bazaki; Tungan Kendegi; Tungan Kotomotoki; Tungan Mai Dawa; Tungan Maisamari; Tungan Mallam Gado; Tungan Mallam Jiki; Tungan Mallam-Mamudu; Tungan Manga Buran; Tungan Marsamari Yekunu; Tungan Musa Dekara; Tungan Ojo; Tungan Okpe Oli; Tungan Sabi; Tungan Sabi Baba; Tungan Sabi Samaru; Tungan Saidu; Tungan Salihu; Tungan Samari; Tungan Samari Biokana; Tungan Sami; Tungan Sanni Gbensibe; Tungan Saraki Fulani; Tungan Sare; Tungan Sebo; Tungan Swaki; Tungan Tofakisabi; Tungan Umaru; Tungan Usman Babade; Tungan Wakili; Tungan Wanzan; Tungan Ware; Tungan Weru Tori; Tungan Yakubu; Tungan Yaru Maiyaki; Tungan Yusuf Bata; Tungan Zaria; Tungari Alh. Bioweite; Tunwa Buran; Yakpe Buran; Yamitoro; Yara Be; Yaru Tangagedo; Yawoji; Yekena; Yekunu; Yen Wuro; Yimoh Buran; Yusufu Bata; Zakari Buran; Zeber ma Buran; Zekana Buran; Ziaah; Zoo Pasi Buran; Zume Buran
Baruten	Ilesha	242103	Agbara Guru; Alaya Village; Augeradebu; Bello Fulani; Boro Sonma; Budo Abini; Budo Abiri; Budo Agbede; Budo Bio Majde; Budo Magagi Biode; Budo Otu; Budo Wara; Bukaru; Fulani; Gbedebere; Godeberi; Gukenbu; Ilesha; Kosomomo; Ruga; Shinawu; Shindaruwa; Singu; Subalo; Subayo; Tabetabere; Timgan Ada Bedo; Timgan Alh Abdullahi; Tunbuya; Tung Adam Summonu; Tung Alh Mudi; Tungan Addu; Tungan Al. Alu; Tungan Alh Mudi; Tungan Arijo; Tungan Atiki Jumbo; Tungan Ban Guda; Tungan Banruga; Tungan Barandi; Tungan Bari Guda; Tungan Bari Jimoh; Tungan Da-Bedo; Tungan Damu Tjoko; Tungan Jobi; Tungan Umaru; Tungan Yoma Falani
Baruten	Okuta	242104	Abata Abu; Abdu Magajibe; Abgake; Aboki-Buran; Abu Buran; Abu Narigbe; Adara; Adehe; Adepe; Adpe; Agberejeh; Ageri; Agwara; Ahamadu-Gene-Buran; Ahe; Ajibe; Ajitunire; Akaha Bayo; Akowa Dogo Buran; Alaba; Alaeta Buran; Alagbede; Alagogo; Alajara; Alakuwa; Alate; Alejata Buran; Alenge; Alerge; Alfa Tarmako; Alh. Amiku; Alh. Ayo; Alh. Gofo-Gbesaji; Alh. Koromotoki; Alh. Ramanu; Alh. Salimonu; Alh. Woru Yamile; Ali; Ali Noma; Aliyu Buran; Amane; Ambali; Anmadu-Gurma-Buran; Anoane; Aremu-Kosigi; Ayegoro; Ba-Gene Buran; Baare Buran; Baba Ibeji; Baba Ilerini; Baba Yowa Buran; Babodonuro; Bah Sabi-Be; Banaguri; Bani; Bani Bani-Gure; Bani Sule; Baniyan-Buran; Banpa; Bashira; Bashurum Buran; Bejira; Beni Kekere Buran; Benu Buran; Bera; Binuwa; Bio Tawo Buran; Bio-Nide-Buran; Biruwolu; Bo; Boko; Boko Nukuyi Buran; Bokonobe; Bonuwolu; Boria; Buba-Buran; Buba-Oloke; Budo Oja; Budo Oki; Budo Ore; Budo Samba; Bunsuru; Bushirikpaara; Chanyo-Buran; Dogo Buran; Egi Oke; Eleku; Elepo; Erinsobare; Essa; Essa-Oke; Gaddamina-Buran; Galo; Galso Buran; Gamdu Buran; Garba-Buran; Gatebe; Gaudamina-Buran; Gbazai Buran; Gbenisi Taku Burab; Ge-Fh-Buran; Ghoro; Gidan Magajia; Gidan-Kanterma; Giwa Buran; Godo-Godo; Gogo; Goma Buran; Gunu Buran; Gunu Sabi-Buran; Gurman Buran; Gwanagiji; Gwaria; Gwaria-Waziri; Hikyan; Jipima; Kafiyan-Buran; Kajin Buran; Kanbi Are; Karagbonkna (2nd); Karagbonna; Karami Buran; Kasabu; Kasimu Roko Buran; Kausla; Kekena-Buran; Kenu; Kimado Buran; Kipaslu Buran; Kokorogi; Komala; Konto Buran; Koronji Buran; Koto Be; Kpassli-be Buran; Kubinla; Kwaruru; Laki-Buran; Lalare Buran; Lidan Ku Buran; Likita Buran; Lilata Buran; Magbo; Mago; Magwo Daji; Manu; Nikipkeru; Okuta; Ororo Tudu; Pagirin Gajere; Passetullu; Raguru; Rofia; Rugan Toru-Kparu; Rumu; Shambo; Sheyen; Shindaruwa; Shiya; Surub; Suteku; Taga Bako-Dokaku; Tanile; Tenbonu; Teu; Tungan Adda; Tungan Adena; Tungan Ajiya; Tungan Baushe; Tungan Bis Gasu; Tungan Bori; Tungan Dinu; Tungan Kuruma; Tungan Lafina; Tungan Shika; Tungan Sunotaka; Tungan-Kade; Umaru Bawa Buran; Ushatau; Usman Fulani; Usman Jodi; Usman-dada-Buran; Usman-Sanibe; Utula; Venra; Voberah; Wayo; Wobi; Woro; Woromakoto; Woru-Daru; Yamboyan; Zamelo
Baruten	Yashikera	242102	Abegerreru; Abion Kparu; Alafi Yaru-Share; Alafiyaru; Alafujaru; Alh Garba Kparu; Alh. Gene; Alh. Mamman; Alu Kparu; Anasanikiru; Angeraodebu; Barukataran Kparu; Bashira; Bassa; Benu; Bereguru; Beru; Bisakwera; Bokaguru; Boni Kanank Kparu; Boriya; Boru; Bulakuko; Bushi Kparu; Bushiru Mare S.; Buyen; Cado (Alafiayanu); Cah-Moro; Chikanda; Chikandu; Cure; Dagoman Karu; Dakasi; Denu Darun Kparu; Diki gamin Kparu; Doganri; Doo Neru; Dunga; Ekenete; Fere Koru; Gah-Awaye; Gando Sund Dede; Gando Sunnon; Ganidu Sumun Kparu; Ganmin Kparu; Garto Kparu; Gbani; Gbe Burabu; Gberabosina; Gendow Senon Kpaku; Geruku Dero Kparu; Gobijowa Kparu; Gobin Kparu; Goruki Garba Kparu; Gudin Kparu; Gure; Guru Kende; Gwane; Gwasoro; Gweewokure; Ibrahim Kparu; Issa Dunbun Kparu; Jenworun Kparu; Jondin Kparu; Kadirin Kparu; Kangbe; Kaoje; Kaounji; Keneugbe; Kenu; Kenu Booku; Kobi Cure; Kobunifu; Kosubosu; Kpabardike; Kparu; Kparuru Gururu; Kparuru Kparu; Kperu Ganik Adam; Kpeyen Kparu; Kwariya-Daaku; Kwaru; Kwaruru; Kwaruru Kworu; Kworu Babanna; Liman Kparu; Makarakpo; Mamman Kparu; Mammandun Kparu; Mara Kparu; Maresumun Kparu; Masun Kparu; Matarun Kparu; Mikikperu; Moral; Mori Guru; Moshi; Moshi Guru; Nasheu Kparu; Nwasero; Oli; Owelle; Pomlo; Sabi Jooden Kparu; Sabi Swaru; Sabo; Saina Toko; Saitun Kparu; Samangen Kparu; Saminin Kparu; San Bion Kparu; Sanisosan Kparu; Sanni Gonadin Kparu; Sekerite; Senugbe; Serkin Fulani Kparu; Shanganun Kparu; Share-Sabo; Shionin-Kparu; Shiya Village; Shru Galasani; Shysinu Kparu; Sinaguru; Sinatokoru; Sinu; Skugbe; Sobutu Gwette; Sonni Aworoi Kparu; Sunsi; Tewure; Tongoru; Tubiriku Guru; Tuka; Tunde; Ugomoe; Umaru Makirin; Washard; Weriguru; Wobero; Woodara; Woru Borun Kparu; Wulran Kparu; Yaaro Guru; Yanri; Yantan Kparu; Yashikira; Yashiru; Yisi Guru; Yobereku; Yonbon Kparu; Yonwonrun Bio; Yonworuni Kparu
Edu	Lafiagi	243101	Anfani; Anfanifagi; Babagina; Bacita Swasun; Baganke; Bedekie; Binla; Bishewa; Bokungi; Bommasu Ward; Borogun; Ceke; Cewuru; Chatta; Chekugi; Chikangi; Dawo; Duba; Dubagi; Dzanagan; Dzara I; Dzara II; Dzara III; Ebangi; Edogi; Edogi-Dukun; Efa-Gi; Effan; Effan Shaaba; Eke; Esu; Falada; Funti; Gagara; Gamale; Gamalegi; Ganagagi; Ganagagi Maiyaki; Ganagagi-Kologbo; Gawagagi Ndejin; Gbadi; Gbake; Gbarigi; Gbogbu; Gbondagi; Gbowoagi; Gede I; Gede II; Gudusuru; Guya-Sede; Guye-Dadi; Guye-Deke; Kimpa; Kokodo; Korabo I; Korabo II; Korabo III; Kpangulu; Kpasha Eitsu Yankpa; Kpashaeltsu Yawkpa; Kpoton Ward; Kpotunko; Kpotunworo; Kuke; Ladan; Lafiagi; Lagaworo; Lata; Lema Woro; Lemo; Likpata; Lukpete; Macha; Magani; Maganike; Maiyaki; Make-Dawu; Manke; Mijinitagi; Ndakodi; Ndeji; Nnayintu; Obale; Pututa; Sabagiwa; Sabo; Sabo II; Sange; Shekwati; Shesiti Dangawa; Sita Abah; Swasungi; Tandu; Tawake; Toga; Upandawaki Ward; Wariku; Wede; Wodata; Wudzu; Yawu; Yelewa; Yibah; Yikpata; Zambufu
Edu	Shonga	243102	Bakpata; Buke; Bussu; Chakyagi; Chetta Bure; Chetta Mayaki; Chiji; Chikangi; Chita; Dmmagi; Dumagi; Dyadya Ningi; Ekikobe; Emi Ndake Finweza; Emiga; Emikpangi; Emiworogi; Etsu Kolle; Faigi; Faigi Banzamin; Faigi Emiman; Gbere; Gbere Edu Issa; Gbere Maafu; Gbere Nabigi; Gbere Sonlawa; Gbore Ndaceko; Gecegugu; Giragi; Gunbaji; Kanke; Kanshi; Kocegi; Kpandaragi Worogi; Kpatake; Kpilegi; Kpotan Ward; Kubeji; Kusogi; Machita; Madkansa Bonkwa; Makwagi; Mamuga; Manadzkwakwa; Manfu; Manuga; Manuga A; Manuga B; Mayaki Ward; Mayakifu; Ndabata Patiji; Ndabata Take; Ndace Baba; Ndakansa Liman; Ndatsadu; Ndeji Ward; Obagbara; Ogudu; Pati Okun; Sanchitagi; Sha /aba Ward; Shigan; shonga; Soko Alabe; Suteneti; Swasun; Tada; Takemwangi; Taruku; Tode Worogi; Tsakpata; Tsunfeneti A; Tsunfeneti B; Tsungenetic C; Yimagi
Edu	Tsaragi	243103	Ankoro; Ankoro Hausawa; Baata Village; Bacita; Badzufu Patike; Belle; Beribe; Bokuwgi 11; Boribe; Dada A; Dada B; Dudugi Late; Dugbangi; Edogi Tswachi; Emidebiwa; Emigbaziti; Emiwaroji; Emiworogi; Emoworogi; Erugi; Esanshi; Eyeforogi; Fadundangi; Fawagun; Fawjewa Bokungi; Galofa; Gandaji; Gbabata; Gbadagun; Gbaduna; Gbagunta; Gbere; Gbodeyeluwa; Gbpde Yaluwa; Gidan Malfan; Ginda; Gondagi; Gulufa Isowa Audu; Gungbawaba; Gunugi; Ielle Bata A; Juma; Kachita; Kandarifu; Kange Elsudangama; Kange Ndadama; Kangelalukpan; Karati Sode; Kochitate; Kosomunu; Kpace Jiya; Kpandaragi; Kpotun Ward; Kuntukpa; Letswa; Maako; Magani Aliya; Magani Gbagunta; Majindu; Mamu; Mandzurugi; Manfu; Mangohota; Manguru; Marara; Mawegi; Mawfu Chikan; Nati; Nbagada; Ndabigi I; Ndabigi II; Ndaceke; Ndafa Taake; Ndafa Tifin; Ndagba; Ndajola Ward; Ndalati; Ndanini; Ninguba; Nnkpe Nupeko; Obadowa; Obaduwa I; Paliduin; Paracita; Pategi; Patidanu; Patigi Adewe; Patigi Samaru; Patigizuwa; Patike; Patiko; Range Ndakukwa; Range Tsaagba; Sabo Bacita; Sabon Gida; Sedegba; Shagari; Sodegi; Sokun Kpan B; Sokunkpan; Sokunpanc; Tangbere Patike; Tangborogi; Tsakpata; Tunku; Ungwa Hausawa; Wote Gwawe; Yabatagi; Yawma Kokonna
Ekiti	Obo - Eruku	252105	Ejiju; Eruku; Isapa; Isapa-Titun; Koro; Obbo-Ile; Ora; Ora-Aiyegbaju
Ekiti	Osi	252104	Ajuba; Araromi-Opin; Are-Opin; Ejiku; Epe-Opin; Etan; Ibare; Idera-Opin; Ikerin-Opin; Isale-Opin; Isolo-Opin; Obo-Opin; Oke-Opin; Osi-Opin; Owafun-Opin
Ifelodun	Agunjin-Ora	241109	Abayan; Abayawo; Abayowo Yemidire; Adegbite; Adegun; Adigun Alangua; Adigun-Adeleke; Adigun-Bale; Agba Olowo; Agbada Temidire; Agbeku; Agbeyangi; Agunjin; Ailefe; Aireke; Aiyekale; Ajagunle Temidire; Ajegna Temidire; Ajegunle; Ajilete; Ajoko Temidire; Alade; Amori Wande Temidire; Araromi Isele Lapele; Araromi Oja; Araromi Oke; Arifowomo; Arowo; Ayante; Balogun; Bolorunduro; Budo Alli; Deseni; Ekudaji; Ekudaji Oke; Esiuniyi Temidire; Gaa Agbeku Araro; Gaa Opelade; Gaa Wande; Gbotoko; Idi-Igba; Igbafe; Isiaka; Ita Olowo; Itapa-Dowo; Kajola; Lapele; Layemi; Magbon; Monasara; Ode-Ologbo Temidire; Ojutaiye Temidire; Okangi; Oke Odo; Olayinka; Olufayo; Opelade; Ora; Ore; Owode Temidire; Patako; Sanni Koro; Tapa; Temidire; Wande
Ifelodun	Ekoende	231110	Abule; Abule Elega; Abule Idi-Irin; Abule Mokoye; Abule Olufi; Eko Ajala; Eko Ende; Olodan
Ifelodun	Iba	231111	Alaaro; Aoku; Iba; Iga Saliu; Igalambe; Isale Aisin; Ojomu; Okose
Ifelodun	Idofin	241112	Abudu; Akata Eleko; Akata Gado; Alakuko; Alamilaya; Amoyo; Elerinjare; Falokun; Gaa Abikoro; Gaa Alakuko; Gaa Butubutu; Gaa Elerinjare; Gaa Ganmo; Gaa Gata; Gaa Kisi; Gamo; Gbagede Isale; Gbagede Oke; Idofin; Ipo-Eri; Jimba-Oja; Kabba Dogari; Kabba Kajola; Kabba Owode; Kaoju; Oke-Iya; Oke-Ogba; Oko-Okuta
Ifelodun	Igbaja	241110	Aaran; Adanla; Afori; Agbeku; Ago; Aguada; Aikere; Aiyekale; Aiyekojo; Aiyeretatun; Ajegunle; Aji Oja; Ajilowo; Ajoko; Akoba; Aladodo; Alarto Ilupeju; Alasoro Alatan; Alatan; Alo; Aloko; Amule; Apakere; Aperu; Araromi-Ogbe; Atori; Awewe; Ayiga; Balogun Oja; Bayero; Bere; Bolorunduro; Budo Ada; Budo Ajiba; Budo Ajuba; Budo Akin; Budo Alayo; Budo-Edun; Dala Ilupeju; Duro Seto; Duroseto Rentile; Elejola; Farase; Gaa Adanla; Gaa Agboran; Gaa Alagbede; Gaa Alhaji; Gaa Alo; Gaa Atiran; Gaa Audu; Gaa Balogun; Gaa Bayer; Gaa Giwa Onilu; Gaa Goga; Gaa Ibare; Gaa Idera; Gaa Idiapa; Gaa Kadiri; Gaa Mosudo; Gaa Offarase; Gaa Ogbe; Gaa Ogele; Gaa Ogunbaka; Gaa Onijo; Gaa Oroku; Gbokole; Gwa; Idera; Idiapa; Idiapa Idiya; Igbaja; Ignanu; Ijekele; Ilupeju; Jobi; Kajola; Kajola II; Kehinde Kajola III; Kunmi; Laokun Araromi; Layioke; Mosunkanne; Obadara; Obate; Obate Modudu; Obin; Odamadi; Odunnada Ilupeju; Offarase; Ogba; Ogbe; Ogele; Ogunniyi; Ojekale; Oke-Ode-Yee; Okegbo; Okenijo; Okotorubo; Oloko; Olorunshogo; Onigbe; Onijo; Opanda; Ore; Oroki; Osin; Owobe; Owode; Palade; Saliu Gaa Adamu; Sanda; Sokoto Gbo; Tonyobolo; Yaru
Ifelodun	Ikirun	231108	Dagbolu; Ikirun; Jagun; Oluode; Saba
Ifelodun	Ile-Ire	241108	Afin; Aga; Aiyereke; Alabe; Amodu Olo; Awere; Aya; Babanla; Baiyero; Bolorunduro; Budo Are; Budo Idowu; Gaa Alabe; Gaa Idera; Gaa Ikosin; Gammu; Gbotoko; Idera; Idiya; Idoba; Ikosin; Kajola; Layemi; Obinn Ayetoro, Okeoyan; Okin; Oko; Olorualeke; Oreke; Oreke-Okegbo; Orekeoke; Owa Onire; Owode; Owode Offaro
Ifelodun	Obagun	231109	Abule Bale; Abule Ologoro; Aogun; Eesa Oke Suru; Igbo Ilamu; Igbo Iroko; Obagun; Oke Ogun; Olorunsogo
Ifelodun	Oke-Ode	241107	Adebu; Adetutu; Adetutu Igbo Agbon; Agbee; Agbee Owotoki; Agbelero 11; Agbetero 1; Aiyetoro; Aiyetoro Agegunle; Ajia; Alade; Alagbe Oja; Alasodudu; Alawo-Yonba; Aleb Asanlu; Amudun; Arola Idris; Arola Sadiku; Asipa; Asipade; Asungbade; Atipo; Atola; Awewe; Bada; Balogun; Bankole; Biji; Bofaje; Buban-Ka; Budo Alagbede; Budu-Efsu; Dabu; Dabu Idris; Dabu Oroki; Dabu-Ojutaiye; Dikko; Ekotuntun; Elesinmeta; Eleyele; Eri-Alhaji; Famole; Gaa - Jihom; Gaa Abudu Asifade; Gaa Jimoh; Gaa Momoda-Elesin Gege; Gaa Musa; Gaa Oke-Ode; Gaa Omu-Are; Gaa Seriki Shagbe; Gaa- Alabe Aiyetoro; Gaa-Alabe; Gaa-Alawo; Gaa-Asungbale; Gaa-Audu; Gaa-Bankole; Gaa-Bello; Gaa-Budo Seu; Gaa-Eleyele 1; Gaa-Eleyele 11; Gaa-Gege; Gaa-Igbo Agbon 1; Gaa-Igbo Agbon 11; Gaa-Judi Adetutu; Gaa-Jumbo-Ologomowode; Giloagi; Igbo Elemi; Keke Aje; Labaka; Labaka-Idera; Labaka-Oju; Obada; Ogboyo; Ogunbayo; Ojukaiye; Okanle; Oke-Ode; Okuta-Oko; Ologoma; Ologorun; Olorunlagba; Oloruntele; Oloruntola; Olowo; Olufayo; Omi Aro; Onigbongbo; Oniminsun; Owode; Pidan; Sagbe; Sagbe Ogede
Ifelodun	Omupo	241111	Agbo-Koko; Ahoro; Aiyekale; Aladia; Alufa; Amberi; Amodu Asungbolu; Apata Kajola; Arugbo; Atanda; Basanyin; Bayagan Ile; Eleyele; Fajeroni; Gaa Idera; Gaa Oke Omu; Gaa Sulu; Gaa- Okenla; Gaa-Indisa; Gaa-Oja; Igberi; Igbo-Efon; Igbo-Owu;Gudugba;Irapa; Koko; Koloko; Layaju; Nda Aliu; Obaloyan; Okanle; Oke-Ode; Olukotun; Omupo; Oyawajo
Ifelodun	Oro-ago	241113	Ahun; Ajegunle; Arin Ago; Ayetoro; Irabon; Oganyin; Oke-Ayin; Oke-Daba; Oke-Owa; Omugo; Oro Ago; Oyate
Ifelodun	Otan Aiye -Gaaju	231119	Otan aiyebaju; Township
Ifelodun	Share	241106	Aderonme; Adio; Agberiako; Aho; Aiyekale; Ajeoripa; Ajibola; Ajikanje-Apata Aje; Alegongo 1; Alegongo-Temidire; Alera; Araromi; Arobye; Arogunyo; Arola; Babanloma; Bata Kajola; Budo Alufa Oyi; Budo Inalowo; Budo Umoru; Budo-Danyan; Budo-Idishin; Budo-Sabo; Budo-Sosun; Dankoju; Eyeforoji; Faje 1; Faje 11; Gaa Mudi; Gaa Seriki; Gaa-Aiko; Gaa-Alera; Gaa-Elejeri; Gaa-Fulani; Gaa-Idiose; Gaa-Jekeje; Gaa-Mogaji; Gaa-Momo; Gaa-Mudi; Gaa-Okelesu; Gaa-Shayo; Igblowowa; Iyana; Managoro; Mosafejo; Pako; Pangbe; Pasinka; Sangotayo; Sekun 1; Sekun 11; Sharagi; Shayo
Ilorin East	Iponrin	240102	Abanra; Abonde; Abudu; Ada Nda; Adobasin; Agbeyangi; Ajelende; Ajimasin; Alade; Alalubosa; Apado; Apata Yakubu; Atere; Ayekale; Ayetoro; Badi; Baiyero; Budo Abagbe; Budo Abanra; Budo Abeli; Budo Adanda; Budo Adelu; Budo Afehin Sanbata; Budo Afeyin; Budo Agara; Budo Agbengende; Budo Agboge; Budo Aigoro; Budo Ajaponna; Budo Ajeyin; Budo Ajiponmi; Budo Ajo Ko; Budo Akinde; Budo Akiwo; Budo Akobale; Budo Alagbe; Budo Alakolaro; Budo Alalubosa; Budo Alase; Budo Alasebo; Budo Ali; Budo Alokolaro; Budo Alufa; Budo Apa Ole; Budo Apekun; Budo Aranmonu; Budo Araro; Budo Are; Budo Aregun; Budo Aribi; Budo Asunlope; Budo Atanpa; Budo Atapa; Budo Ateko; Budo Atenge; Budo Atingiri; Budo Atiran; Budo Ayekale; Budo Baba Taiye; Budo Babatunde; Budo Bada; Budo Bada Owe; Budo Bolorunduro; Budo Bolorunshoro; Budo Bubu Kere Aje; Budo Dangiwa; Budo Doguna; Budo Elekan; Budo Elesimete; Budo Eleyode; Budo Eri Oke; Budo Faje; Budo Famole; Budo Fulani; Budo Gaa Gande; Budo Gaa Jowuro; Budo Gaa Suallah; Budo Gangan; Budo Gbadamu; Budo Gori; Budo Idi Ogun; Budo Idi Ose; Budo Idi-Ori; Budo Idigba; Budo Idikanga; Budo Igbo Orun; Budo Ilaga; Budo Ile Tuntun; Budo Isamu; Budo Jagbo; Budo Jolasun; Budo Kawu; Budo Kelebe; Budo Labe; Budo Lossa; Budo Magaji; Budo Maternity; Budo Megun; Budo Oba; Budo Odunbaku; Budo Odunre; Budo Ogunronbi; Budo Oh Ologun; Budo Ojutaye; Budo Okaka; Budo Oke; Budo Oke Imale; Budo Oke Odo; Budo Oke-Ode; Budo Oku; Budo Ologi; Budo Olokuta; Budo Ololekan; Budo Oloro; Budo Olororo; Budo Olukolu; Budo Omo Mere Oja; Budo Omoda; Budo Onidanla; Budo Onigba; Budo Otefan; Budo Oyekan; Budo Oyo; Budo Pakobo; Budo Ruga Omo; Budo Sabo; Budo Sanu; Budo Sentu; Budo Songote; Budo Sunbare; Budo Tapa Odobo; Budo Tapa Onilu; Budo Toto; Budo Woowode; Budo Yanganmu; Dalemo; Idiape; Ile Apa; Ilota; Ilota, Bada; Iponrin; Isale Osin; Jabi; Kere Aje; Kure; Lajiki; Lajolo; Marafa; Mere; Oke-Ose; Onikoko; Onimomo; Oromi; Oshin; Oyo; Panada; Pepele; Woru
Ilorin South	Gaa Akanbi	240103	Oke Ogun; Agbabiaka; Aiyekale; Akanbi; Apa-Ola; Okose, Mogaji-Ajomu, Omomere-Oja,;Bada-Ajegunle, Ere-Omo; Fate; Fufu; Igbona; Illota; Joromoh-Osin; Bada-Ajegunle; Joromo-Oyun; Labala; Mogaji; Nasudo; Omode; Onikanga; Opolo; Tanke; Tongolo
Ilorin West	Ilorin (rural)	240101	Adewole; Airport; Are; Baba Isale; Baboko; Badari; Balogun Ajikabi; Balogun Alanamu; Balogun Fulani; Budo Oba; Budo-Ago; Egbejila; Galadima; Ibagun; Idera; Kawu; Magaji Ngari; Obere; Odo-Ota; Odota; Ogidi; Ojuekun; Okaka; Oke Ogun; Oko-Erin; Oloje; Olomoda; Osere; Sobi-Rock; Temidire; Ubadawaki; Wara; Zango; Zarumi
Irepodun	Ajase	251103	Aba Ilorin; Aba Rasaki; Adigun; Afelele; Agbamu; Agbonda; Ago; Ago Inisa; Ago Osilo; Ago Panu; Ago-Offa; Ajasse Ipo; Ajegunle; Ajengbe; Ajooko; Amberi; Apata Kajola; Araromi Ajase; Aworo; Ayobiamo; Bayanga; Buari; Dugbe; Egi-Oyopo; Egudu; Elega; Eleyoka; Eyeba; Falukun; Igbonla; Ilala; Mamudu; Okeya; Omido; Onila; Owoyale; Oyanle; Oyate; Sanmora
Irepodun	Erin	230104	Akanbi; Alamo; Anu; Apata Agbore; Elegudu; Erin; Gaa; Iloba; Olorunsogo; Osolo
Irepodun	Esie-Ijan	251102	Agbele; Esiẹ; Ijan
Irepodun	Ilobu	230103	Abepe; Aboduwa; Adeniyi; Aderibigbe; Agborogun; Ajala; Akogun; Alagbaa; Alapata; Anwosi; Aresa; Bara; Eboda; Eji; Fosun; Ilie Twon; Ilobu; Iyaloja; Jagun; Kaura; Mota; Odofin; Odurwale; Ogala; Ogundaro; Ogunlana; Olokwa; Oloriga; Olueti; Olufon; Omilola; Opapa; Orisadare; Oyegple; Oyesiji
Irepodun	Omu-Aran	251101	Ado-Agbo; Aran-Orin; Arandun; Budo- Aran; Elehin Olodo; Ipetu Igbomina; Oke Igbala; Olomi; Oloruntele; Olowonijere; Omirinrin; Omuaran; Orore; Owode
Irepodun	Oro	251104	Abata; Abode Oro; Afin-Oro; Agbaola Oro; Iddo-Oro; Iludun Oro; Ojomu Oro; Oke-Ola Oro; Okerimi Oro; Olorunsogo; Oro
Isin	Isin	251105	Abata Oke; Adigun; Ajegunle; Alla; Budo Manasara; Budo-Igbira; Edidi; Eleyin; Igbesi; Ijara-Isin; Iji; Iklo; Isanlu Isin; Iwo; Kajola; Kudu-Owode; Oba; Odo-Eku; Odo-Ore; Oke-Aba; Oke-Onigbin; Oke-Oyi; Opanda; Opega; Owa Onire; Owu Isin; Pamo; Sabaja
Isin	Oko-Ola	251106	Inisan; Oko; Olla
Kaiama	Kaiama	242101	Adena; Bamisila; Bani; Batabi; Biovanubo; Bunikani; Frenaba; Garba Ghanga; Gati; Gberia; Gwanabe; Gwareguri; Gwaria; Jekuna; Kageji; Kaiama Unhuibar Saki; Kaima; Kanikoro; Karonji; Kemeji; Kerokun; Kimodo; Kinkini; Kuliji; Madugu Barn; Madugu Boko; Magai; Magaji; Magi Konko; Mai Gemi; Mai Saje; Maidarra Buran; Maidugu Buran; Makeri Buran; Mallam Ango Buran; Mallam Sani Buran; Mamman Buran; Manar Buran; Miji Buran; Mohammed Fari; Moshi; Mukuzi; Musa Baniya; Musa Dabarrai; Ogbagba; Ogbomosho; Ogunniyi; Oko o; Oleri; Oloba; Olokotintin; Olomo Oba; Olowo; Olupo; Olupo Olomopupa; Olupo Yobeyo; Onipako; Onipako Wele Wehe; Onkorolabe Labe; Onpede; Osejene; Ossa; Oyo Buran; Panaje; Patekuku; Patekutu Jejuna; Popo; Tungan Mohammed; Wajiba; Wazibe; Wele Wele; Wenra; Wondo; Woro; Woro Makata; Woro Makoto; Woru Baba be; Woru Oil Buran; Yamani; Yebera; Yera; Zanje
Moro	Ejidon-Gari	241102	Aaro; Abaoki; Abike; Abogunrin; Adebiyi; Afoda; Afunkinkin; Agbaa; Agbakale; Agbaki-Eji; Agbakun; Agbewe; Agogo; Aiyede; Aiyetoro; Ajeteri; Ajuba; Akunu; Akuo; Alaba; Aladie; Alagban; Alagbara; Alagbeja; Alakuko; Alaran; Alasa; Amu; Apata; Ariori; Ariya; Aro/Akuo; Atawin; Ati; Atiku; Ayede; Babadudu; Bale; Bante Owo; Bielesin; Budo; Budo Agbe; Budo Oke; Budo-Abu; Budo-Are; Dada; Daya; Egberioma; Ejidogemi; Ejidongari; Eleja; Elelu; Eleni; Elere; Elesin Nla; Ero; Faje; Fanto; Fayabale; Gaa Aginbso; Gaa Dare; Gaa Jodama; Gado; Gambo; Gbanbalako; Gboro; Idi-Ose; Igbira; Igbo-Emu; Igboemu; Ige; Iju-Owa; Ilu-Fenwa; Ita Giwa; Ita-Alade; Jafe; Jodoma; Jokolu; Koleke; Labaje; Lagbaja; Laigbe; Lamudebo; Matanmi; Odentan; Odentan-Ile; Odentan-Olulu; Odun-Ade; Ogunbo; Ogunbo-Akamu; Oguntulu; Okanla; Okoko; Okuta-Ogun; Okutala; Oladolo; Olaya; Olokiti; Onigbera; Onile-Aro; Owu-Dudu; Rofese; Saja; Sami; Sheji; Sunmela
Moro	Lanwa	241101	Adio; Afari-Ogun; Agbeka; Aiyelekan; Aiyetoro; Alufa-Ojerere; Apata Oko; Arere; Arola; Awesu; Awokunle; Bako; Bi-Elesin; Biala; Biribiri; Bode-Saadu; Budo Gaa; Budo Kawu; Budo Oloye; Budo-Ayan; Budo-Oba; Buka; Dalemo; Daudu; Elelu; Elemaso; Fala; Fangan; Fayabale; Fulani; Gambe Alagbede; Ganbe; Gata; Gbudugu; Idiapa; Idowu; Irobo; Isakara; Iyare; Jebba; Kabba; Koronwon; Korowa; Ladabu; Lamigan; Lanwa; Lasaki; Maya; Obate; Ogunbo; Oke-Aje; Okemi; Ologun; Oloye; Olukowi; Omoda; Oni Pako; Onibembe; Orogun; Pawo; Shaki; Sulu; Were; Yesele
Moro	Malete	241104	Abe-Igba; Abe-Ope; Abeelu; Abeokuta; Abo; Abuyanrin; Adanduro; Adejinmi; Adetinmi; Agar; Agbaku; Agga; Ago; Agobarade; Agosoja; Ahere; Ajagbe; Ajagunle; Ajanaku; Ajelanwa; Akata; Aladie; Alagogo; Alakasu; Alapo; Alaro; Alaya; Alere; Aluga; Amao; Aoodu; Asalapa; Asipa; Baba Tapa; Batamu; Bube; Bulamu; Busamu; Dafari; Elebenla; Eleburu; Elefere; Elepo Agbaku; Epo; Gaa Abiyo; Gaa Adejinmi; Gaa Aiyekale; Gaa Ajagbe; Gaa Alakasa; Gaa Alapo; Gaa Asipa; Gaa Bube; Gaa Bulo Alfa; Gaa Igbo-Onisu; Gaa Jehun Kunnu; Gaa Kekere Ekun; Gaa Larama; Gaa Logun; Gaa Malete; Gaa Oyedele; Gaa Panbo; Gaa Seko; Gbugudu; Ida-Isaa; Idiagano; Idiape; Igbo-Onishin; Igbo-Riku; Ihoo; Jehunkunnu; Jododo; Karibuje; Kawu; Kekere Ekun; Kogbala; Kondondo; Lamula; Logun; Malete; Marafa; Obalaja; Obale; Oboku; Ogala; Ogungbe; Ojutaye; Okete; Okoru; Olo Runshola; Olobi; Olodan; Oloko; Oloungbona; Olowo; Olowu-Remi; Omoni Araro; Omoni Etile; Onidoyin; Onigba; Oniko; Onikoko; Onilende; Onilu; Opanda; Owode; Paku; Panbo; Panpo; Poupoju; Tegbesun
Moro	Oloru	241103	Abamba; Abati; Abilude; Abiodun; Aboya; Abuala; Abudala; Abuyanrin; Adama; Adio; Adunmode; Agba; Agbede I; Agbede II; Agbogun; Ago; Aiyekale; Aiyetoro; Ajangbala; Ajegunle; Ajegunle Kondo I; Ajegunle Kondo II; Ajia; Ajia Paunma; Akuo; Alagba; Alagbede; Alasan; Ale-Ara; Amandu; Amukoko; Aoddu; Apata Oko; Apata-Obalade; Apoya Owode; Apoya-Oja; Ara; Araro; Araromi; Ariori; Aro; Arodo; Asomu; Asorede; Asunara; Atipo; Ayakio; Ayehun; Ayonde; Balapa; Budo Alfa; Budo Are; Budo Edun; Budo Epo; Budo Gatta; Budo Hassan; Budo Iletintun; Budo Isale; Budo Kawu; Budo Obe; Budo Oke; Budo Ona; Budo Orobo; Budo Owode; Diko; Dio; Dogo; Ebudale; Eleko Yangan; Elemere Isale; Elemere-Oke; Elesin Nla; Esinlakin; Gaa Abeya; Gaa Abilude; Gaa Keremi; Gaa Ogun Tolu; Gaambari; Gboroko; Gee-Kari; Gesinde; Gidaje; Gori-Aja; Idi-Apa; Idiapa; Idigba; Ikusanu; Iya-Aro; Iyalasinyan; Jokolu; Kasumu; Kiribi; Kuro; Laro; Latemi; Liala; Luma; Magaji Gambari; Maleke; Mama; Managji; Manasara; Masankore; Megun; Mele; Mumumi; Obada; Obamisunwa; Ogala; Ogbagba; Ogboman; Ogojo; Ogongo; Ogun Eduin; Ogunekan; Oguntolu; Ojulogbo; Ojutaye; Okanla; Oke Apan; Oke-Odo; Okutala; Olobi; Oloni; Oloru I; Oloru II; Oloya; Olugbiya; Omolegbe; Onibamu; Onigari; Onigba; Onisapa; Ore; Osalakin; Owode I; Owode II; Pakunma; Rapameji; Saka; Sara; Shao; Shao-Ile; Tafidi; Tepatan; Wari; Womi-Ayaki; Yeregi; Yowere
Moro	Paiye	241105	Abami; Abani; Abere-Ijo; Adara; Adeku; Adukesi; Agbaku; Agbede; Agbele; Agede; Ago Ontolotolo; Agogoja; Ajegunle; Ajisaye; Ajuba; Akapo; Akata; Akata Elelu; Akata Kojere; Akilotan; Akiri Manu; Alaba; Alagangan; Alagbo; Alagogo; Alagogo-Weru; Alaje Alajo; Alaka; Alakara; Alakuko; Alama; Alapa Sanpa; Alapo; Alarara Alaje; Alate; Alateko; Alawuyan; Alaya; Alega; Amma; Anifowose; Aniya; Apata; Apo; Aro; Arobadi; Asawure; Asogba; Asunnara; Awuyan; Ayifo; Ayigoro; Baba Tapa; Babaloke; Bacita Junction; Bagbenu; Baki; Balogun; Barama; Beli; Biala; Binukonu; Bosamo Akeremi; Budo Alafa; Budo Ale Banda; Budo Eko; Budo Loke; Budo Ode; Budo Ojo Amari; Budo Ojude; Budo Oki; Budo Ole; Budo-Ode; Busamu; Dagoji; Daji; Deseni; Egboelemi; Ejin; Elebekan; Elebu; Elega; Elegun; Eleja Raji; Elejola; Elere; Elesin Nla; Elewure; Eniadunma; Ewuji; Gaa Agbaku; Gaa Alhaji Bamo; Gaa Alogbo; Gaa Apo; Gaa Barama; Gaa Eletu; Gaa Gboroko; Gaa Igbo Elemi; Gaa Jouro; Gaa Jowuro; Gaa Kanike; Gaa Lawoyin; Gaa Olopele; Gaa Osinginmi; Gaa Tepadu; Gaa Worunkure; Gareji; Gbada; Giwa Olowo; Gudu; Gunniyan; Ibagun; Idi Apa; Igbo-Elemi; Igboede; Igboroko; Inawole; Isale-Oja; Ita Yanmuyanmu; Iyanakere; Jokolu; Jokoro; Jopoko; Kibo-Alufa; Kulende; Kunmi; Ladoyin; Lahila; Lanle Gidado; Lanwa Ojo; Laonu; Magaji; Manlare; Mari; Megidaju; Meri-Oja; Miraya; Odonigi; Ogan; Oke Awuyan; Oke Dare; Oke Olori; Oke-Bode; Oke-Itta; Okiarenu; Olege; Olodan; Olododo; Ologbojo; Olokotintin; Olopan; Olopan Olori; Olopanfo; Olopele; Olori; Olorisogi; Olorogbo; Olorunlana; Olose; Olowo Bale; Olowo Hanman; Olowo Kareem; Olowode; Oloworu; Omidaro; Onigba; Onigbese; Onikoko; Onile-Aro; Onilu; Oniparo; Onipede; Onisun; Onisunju; Oniwa; Ori-Oke Yahaya; Orioke; Orogungan; Osinginmi; Oteleko; Paiye; Paku; Popola; Salako; Sangote; Sipata; Somape; Taru; Temidire Olupo
Offa	Offa	250101	Adeleke; Ago Daniel; Ago Gbada; Ago Ilobu; Ago Isola; Ago Maleki; Ago Mogaji; Ago Offa; Ahogbada; Ajegunle; Ajelanwa; Ajoko; Alabanle; Alabere; Alagi; Alao; Alase; Alaya; Alayin; Alayin Aleyin; Alebale; Aleniboro; Apara; Aperin; Asaoye; Asapate; Asipa; Awesu; Awoniyi; Ayekale; Ayeni; Bale Oke Aro; Bolorunduro; Buraimoh; Ekesin Funfun; Eleeku; Erin-Osun; Erinle; Faje; Falokun Jogun; Falokun Owode; Fibike; Gaa Momodu; Galiadi; Ganmo Oko; Gbosura; Gudugba; Igbaweere; Igbo Idun; Igbo Ilofa; Ila Market Station; Ilasa; Ilemona; Inaja Alaro; Inaja Maliki; Ira; Kere Aje; Offa
Oke-Ero	Ekan Meje	252102	Ayedun; Eken; Erinmope; Ilale; Imoji
Oke-Ero	Idofian	252103	Idofin Odo-Ashe; Idofin-Aiyekale; Idofin-Eyinafo; Idofin-Igbana; Idofin-Odo-Afo; Idofin-Odoaga
Oke-Ero	Ilofa/Odo-Owa	252101	Iloffa; Odo-Owa
Oyun	Odo-Ogun	250102	Afijagbade; Agara; Agbamu; Agbo Maja; Ago Balomi; Ago Offa; Ago Olomaba; Aho Igbada; Aje Boki; Ajebandele; Ajekunle; Ajoko; Alaya; Alentbaro; Anaja Moliki; Aponpa; Araromi; Asaoye; Asipa; Asopata; Ayobiamo; Bakini; Belore; Bude Peke; Dake; Dalemo; Ejedilogun; Eleku; Elesin Funfu; Erin-Ile; Fibike; Fufu; Gbolowuduro; Idi Osa; Igberi Ogun; Igberi Osa; Igbo-Alu; Igbona; Igosun; Ile Mogun; Ilemona; Inaja Alaro; Ipe; Ira; Jingini; Kajola; Kamumu; Kolo; Laniyan; Mandol; Odo Ogun; Odowo; Oginte; Ojutaiye; Okelede; Okeogun; Ologuro; Olomi; Olomitaka; Onisapa; Osere; Owode; Parioro; Ramonu; Romode; Sakongba; Somoda; Tabi Olowo; Togun
Oyun	Oke-Ogun	250103	Adeleke; Agbamu; Ago Aminu; Ago Fulani Jimoh; Ago Offa; Apata Aje; Aperun; Awoniyi; Ayeni; Bamo-Oko; Budo; Eleeku; Elemo Ogun; Falokun Owode; Faje; Gamo; Giiji; Goro; Gudugbo; Igagbo; Igbodun; Igbotele; Igosun; Ijagbo; Ikotun; Ilota; Ipee; Iwoye; Iyeke; Kere Ige; Labisi; Laro; Mosunkare; Ogakunrin; Ogunde; Ojoku; Oke-Ari; Oke-Lala; Oke-Oye
Pategi	Kpada	243106	Babogi; Bide; Dagbalode; Dkatsa; Dode; Duro; Ebu; Eka-Cheja; Etchiwada; Etsuvum Emiworogi; Etusuyum; Ezhigike; Fei; Fuma; Gakpan; Gbafa; Gbagufa; Gheti; Gubgi; Guluki; Kajita; Koji; Kokingu; Kokoparagi; Koripkin; Koro; Kpada; Kpatagba; Kusegi; Kusoti; Latagi; Lubaman; Ma Agi; Maba; Mamba; Mandzigakwa; Mashan; Matotun; Mongi; Mosin; Nimbe; Okusogi; Pati; Reshe; Rokan Kuse; Rokan Tunga; Rokoggi; Sa'Agi; Saiasi; Suku; Szuruta; Tankpatu; Tbadan; Tebe; Tsanba; Tutugi; Vuma; Wadata Duro; Wake; Yagbagi; Yagbagi Roko; Zhiswara; Zunuta
Pategi	Lade	243104	Bissan; Chenegi; Chitta; Danikun; Dengi; Dina; Dzake; Edegi-Chapa; Ekakpan; Ekati; Esun; Gada-Wdake; Gadavozuwa; Gadaworo; Gbangede; Gbangede Bologi; Gberi; Gbodo; Gbodoniji; Ilua; Kagewegi; Kakafu; Kokodo; Kusokoti; Lade; Lalagi; Lata; Lille; Magya; Mawagi; Okpoto; Okuluse; Sagnuwan; Sakpefu; Sansita; Szwajiwo; Yekosa
Pategi	Pategi	243105	Charikpan; Dangifu; Edegi Ekpasananke; Edozhigi; Ellah; Emigi; Esungi; Gabi Ward; Gada; Gada-Bazuwa; Gamejefu; Gbade Pati; Gbadekin; Gbaradego; Gbogi; Geduragi; Kolushin-Egboro; Koshiworo; Kparumagi; Kpayi; Kpotun; Kpotwa; Kusogi; Lagada; Lanlegi; Lazgi Yissa; Likefu; Makun Ward; Nawogi; Ndeji Ward; Opta-Wgboro; Pategi; Ragada; Rifun; Sheshi Sahaaba Ward; Shesihi Tsaha; Taadza Ward; Tsaduke Ward; Tswatagi; Wando; Yabinti

== By electoral ward ==
Below is a list of polling units, including villages and schools, organised by electoral ward.

LGA	Ward	Polling Unit Name
Asa	Yowere/Sosoki	Sosoki L G E A Sch; Oniyeye Open Space; Laodu 1 Open Space; Idi-Ose L.G.E.A Sch
Asa	Adigbongbo/Awe/Orimaro	Adigbongbo L.G.E.A Sch; Awe L.G.E.A Sch; Afo-Oja L.G.E.A Sch; Yede/Orimaro L.G.E.A Sch; Tiro L.G.E.A Sch
Asa	Elebue/Agbona/Fata	Oja-Iya L.G.E.A Sch; Agbona L.G.E.A Sch; Megida Edunjo Open Space I; Megida Edunjo Open Space II; Omojamo Dispensary; Igboroko L.G.E.A Sch; Budo Tuntun Open Space
Asa	Onire/Odegiwa/Alapa	Alapa L.G.E.A Sch; Kondoro L.G.E.A Sch; Ode-Giwa Market; Onikeke L.G.E.A Sch; Onire Alhaji Open Space; Labitan L.G.E.A Sch; Alapa Koro Open Space
Asa	Yowere 11/Okeweru	Alapete Dispensary; Bakase L.G.E.A Sch; Olupo-Ijana L.G.E.A Sch; Abiowa L.G.E.A Sch; Abemi L.G.E.A Sch
Asa	Gambari/Aiyekale	Dongari Etile L.G.E.A Sch; Sokoto L.G.E.A Sch
Asa	Efue/Berikodo	Efue L.G.E.A Sch; Berikodo L.G.E.A Sch; Gbenagbena L.G.E.A Sch
Asa	Owode/Gbogun	Owode L.G.E.A Sch; Ajuwon L.G.E.A Sch; Gbogun L.G.E.A Sch; Elere/Tafatafa L.G.E.A Sch
Asa	Ballah/Otte	Otte L.G.E.A Sch; Budo Are L.G.E.A Sch; Ballah L.G.E.A Sch; Araromi L.G.E.A Sch; Eyenkorin L.G.E.A Sch; Otte Market; Otte Maternity; Area Court Ballah; Gbagba L.G.E.A Sch; Ile Abe Otte Open Space; Lasoju Open Space
Asa	Ogbondoroko/Reke	Reke L.G.E.A Sch; Ogbondoroko Dispensary; Ogbondoroko L.G.E.A Sch; Ogbondoroko A.I.S.S
Asa	Ago-Oja/Oshin/Sapati/Laduba	Laduba L.G.E.A Sch; Laduba Area Court I; Laduba Area Court II; Abayawo L.G.E.A Sch; Sapati-Ile L.G.E.A Sch; Ago-Oja Dispensary; Budo Agun Open Space; Teru Open Space
Asa	Afon	Afon L.G.E.A Sch; Afon Area Court; Afon C. D Office; Kankan L.G.E.A Sch; Igboroko L.G.E.A Sch
Asa	Ila-Oja	Ila Oja L.G.E.A Sch; Ajelanwa L.G.E.A Sch; Aboto-Alfa L.G.E.A Sch; Foko L.G.E.A Sch; Oguntoyinbo L.G.E.A Sch; Oniguguru L.G.E.A Sch; Oloro L.G.E.A Sch; Sapati Oko L.G.E.A Sch; Oniyere L.G.E.A Sch
Asa	Ogele	Ogele L.G.E.A Sch; Ogele Dispensary; Pampo L.G.E.A Sch; Aladere Mogaji L.G.E.A Sch
Asa	Budo-Egba	St Kelvin L.G.E.A Sch I; St Kelvin L.G.E.A Sch II; Adabata L.G.E.A Sch; Koroke L.G.E.A Sch; Onigbo L.G.E.A Sch; Elemi-Nla L.G.E.A Sch; Agboyi-Nla L.G.E.A Sch
Asa	Okesho	Okesho L.G.E.A Sch; Afeyin L.G.E.A Sch
Asa	Odo-Ode/Aboto	Aboto L.G.E.A Sch I; Aboto L.G.E.A Sch II; Budo-Aro L.G.E.A Sch; Odo-Ode L.G.E.A Sch; Omole L.G.E.A Sch; Owode Alagbon L.G.E.A Sch
Baruten	Boriya/Shiya	Boriya L.G.E.A Sch; Boriya Sabo Area; Dankoru Open Space I; Dankoru Open Space II; Ogamue L.G.E.A Sch; Bushiparu L.G.E.A Sch; Bushiru L.G.E.A Sch; Shiya L.G.E.A Sch; Gbiribu/Gbayina; Kpaluru L.G.E.A Sch; Shiya Old Market; Shiya New Market; Tundun Wada Open Space Shiya
Baruten	Gure/Gwasoro	Monre L.G.E.A Sch; Moshi L.G.E.A Sch; Bwereguru L.G.E.A Sch; Kurabaru L.G.E.A Sch; Tuga L.G.E.A Sch; Gwasoro L.G.E.A Sch; Gwane L.G.E.A Sch; Sabo Sare; Yanri L.G.E.A Sch; Ajegunle/Gure New Mrket; Banikani/Gure Open Space; Gure Old Market; Gure L.G.E.A Sch; Sinaguru L.G.E.A Sch; Kosubosu Area Court; Kosubosu L.G.E.A Sch
Baruten	Gwedebereru/Babane	Gukonbu Market; Waguru Market; Babane L.G.E.A Sch; Gwedebereru L.G.E.A Sch
Baruten	Gwanara	Gobbo L.G.E.A Sch; Dokonu Gobbo Open Space; Maresunokparu L.G.E.A Sch; Mamunekperu L.G.E.A Sch; Kiyayeru L.G.E.A Sch; Munko L.G.E.A Sch; Kubure L.G.E.A Sch; Gbirinu/Ningurume L.G.E.A Sch; Ningurume Old Market; Ningurume L.G.E.A Sch; Ginawara New Market; Gwanara L.G.E.A Sch; Gwanara Central Office I; Gwanara Central Office II
Baruten	Ilesha	Kpakotoru L.G.E.A Sch; Yakiburaru Market; Kosomono L.G.E.A Sch; Nanoru L.G.E.A Sch; Ilesha Area Court; Ilesha Sabo Area I; Ilesha Sabo Area II; Ilesha T. V Centre I; Ilesha T. V Centre II; Ilesha L.G.E.A Sch; Ilesha Dispensary
Baruten	Kenu/Taberu	Nikkikperu L.G.E.A Sch; Baah L.G.E.A Sch; Gankotoru L.G.E.A Sch; Yanbereku L.G.E.A Sch; Gbengbereru L.G.E.A Sch; Yakparu L.G.E.A Sch; Sheye L.G.E.A Sch; Kenu New Market; Kenu L.G.E.A Sch; Taberu Old Market; Taberu L.G.E.A Sch
Baruten	Kpaura/Yakiru	Gbongboru L.G.E.A Sch; Dogere L.G.E.A Sch; Kontubaru L.G.E.A Sch I; Kontubaru L.G.E.A Sch II; Munduro L.G.E.A Sch; Ayoo L.G.E.A Sch; Wonkoru L.G.E.A Sch; Kero L.G.E.A Sch; Bekia Kero; Yakiru Market; Yakiru L.G.E.A Sch
Baruten	Kiyoru/Bwen	Biogberu L.G.E.A Sch I; Biogberu L.G.E.A Sch II; Dawiru L.G.E.A Sch; Budo Aiki L.G.E.A Sch; Kiyoru L.G.E.A Sch; Borobiye L.G.E.A Sch; Bwen L.G.E.A Sch; Bukuro L.G.E.A Sch; Gbabe Market; Gbabe L.G.E.A Sch; Damera L.G.E.A Sch; Sindiburo Market; Kobiaro Market
Baruten	Okuta	Tenge L.G.E.A Sch; Bero L.G.E.A Sch; Temidire/Aroguru L.G.E.A Sch; Teu L.G.E.A Sch; Fonfon L.G.E.A Sch; Bankubu L.G.E.A Sch; Tenbonu L.G.E.A Sch; Kabodonoru L.G.E.A Sch; Gbana Guru L.G.E.A Sch; Okuta Gongo Boru Market; Okuta Gorobani Market; Okuta Barike Peoples' Bank; Okuta Baptist L.G.E.A Sch; Okuta Sango Market; Okuta Central L.G.E.A Sch; Okuta Nasarawa New Market
Baruten	Shinawu/Tunbuyan	Tebetaberu Market; Tunbuyan L.G.E.A Sch; Bukaru L.G.E.A Sch; Subayo L.G.E.A Sch; Shinawu Old Market I; Shinawu Old Market II; Shinawu L.G.E.A Sch
Baruten	Yashikira	Dogari Market; Wodora L.G.E.A Sch; Karonji L.G.E.A Sch; Gwette L.G.E.A Sch; Bweru/Gando L.G.E.A Sch; Shinatoko L.G.E.A Sch; Kuburufu L.G.E.A Sch; Kenugbe Market; Sekugbe Market; Yashikira Old Market; Yashikira L.G.E.A Sch; Chikanda Old Market; Chikanda L.G.E.A Sch; Chikanda Sango Area; Gwette Saamu Open Space
Edu	Lafiagi 1	L.G.E.A Sch Somasun I; L.G.E.A Sch Somasun II; L.G.E.A Sch Somasun III; L.G.E.A Sch Tako-Gabi I; L.G.E.A Sch Tako-Gabi II; Open Space Egban Makun Area; Open Space Egban Nafene Area; Open Space Egban Baraka Area; Open Space Lafigyami Area; Open Space Egban Lioran Swasun; Magistrate Court Lafiagi
Edu	Lafiagi 11	L.G.E.A Sch Abagyama I; L.G.E.A Sch Abagyama II; Local Govt Dispensary; Area Court Lafiagi; L.G.E.A Sch Central I; L.G.E.A Sch Central II; Open Space Mankitabu; Open Space Egban Ndamaraki; L.G.E.A Sch Kokodo; Co-Operative Store; Open Space Egban Ndeji Area
Edu	Lafiagi 111	L.G.E.A Sch Zambufu; L.G.E.A Sch Guyedadi; L.G.E.A Sch Guye Doko; L.G.E.A Sch Gbale; L.G.E.A Sch Ganagagi; L.G.E.A Sch Kpotunko; L.G.E.A Sch Yawu; L.G.E.A Sch Gbugbu; Vet Office Gagara; L.G.E.A Sch Sabagina; L.G.E.A Sch Cheko Shaaban; L.G.E.A Sch Ndeji
Edu	Lafiagi 1v	Open Space Lumaba Village; L.G.E.A Sch Kpasha; L.G.E.A Sch Lipata; L.G.E.A Sch Puta; L.G.E.A Sch Gondangi; L.G.E.A Sch Edogi-Dokun I; L.G.E.A Sch Edogi-Dokun II; L.G.E.A Sch Dzara; Open Space Funti Village; L.G.E.A Sch Ekko; L.G.E.A Sch Esun; L.G.E.A Sch Tswako; L.G.E.A Sch Kpankparagi
Edu	Tsaragi 1	L.G.E.A Sch Kange; L.G.E.A Sch Patiko; L.G.E.A Sch Dada; L.G.E.A Sch Esanzhi; L.G.E.A Sch Kpandaragi; L.G.E.A Sch Batakpan; L.G.E.A Sch Jiyade; L.G.E.A Sch Gbaguta; L.G.E.A Sch Ninguba; Open Space Mawokpan Village
Edu	Tsaragi 11	Local Govt Dispensary Bacita I; Local Govt Dispensary Bacita II; Open Space Pati-Tunku Area; Umca Primary Sch Bacita; Local Govt Sub Office Bacita; Local Govt Dispensary Bacita Village; L.G.E.A Sch Manfu; L.G.E.A Sch Belle; L.G.E.A Sch Fanagu; L.G.E.A Sch Shishita; L.G.E.A Sch Egbangi; L.G.E.A Sch Lealea Woro
Edu	Tsaragi 111	District Office Tsaragi I; District Office Tsaragi II; L.G.E.A Sch Tsaragi; Local Govt Dispensary Tsaragi; L.G.E.A Sch Bokungi; L.G.E.A Sch Patidzuru; L.G.E.A Sch Kosumunu; Open Space Old Garage Tsaragi; L.G.E.A Sch Dubangi; L.G.E.A Sch Tsakpata; Open Space Mayara Area Tsaragi; Open Space Kpatayaru Area; Open Space Tswaatafu Area
Edu	Tsonga 1	District Office Tsonga; Local Govt Dispensary Tsonga; L.G.E.A Sch Kuchita; L.G.E.A Sch Emi-Ndeji I; L.G.E.A Sch Emi-Ndeji II; L.G.E.A Sch Bonzo I; L.G.E.A Sch Bonzo II; Open Space Yimagi Village; Open Space Kusogi Village; Open Space Kpatako Village
Edu	Tsonga 11	L.G.E.A Sch Dumagi I; L.G.E.A Sch Dumagi II; L.G.E.A Sch Gboro; L.G.E.A Sch Tspata; L.G.E.A Sch Pati Okun; L.G.E.A Sch Kanko; L.G.E.A Sch Sinasun; L.G.E.A Sch Manuga; L.G.E.A Sch Tsufene
Edu	Tsonga 111	L.G.E.A Sch Mayaki; L.G.E.A Sch Faigi; Market Sq Faigi; L.G.E.A Sch Bidugi; L.G.E.A Sch Sanchitagi I; L.G.E.A Sch Sanchitagi II; L.G.E.A Sch Ogudu I; L.G.E.A Sch Ogudu II; L.G.E.A Sch Tada; L.G.E.A Sch Ndakansa
Ekiti	Eruku	St Cyprian Sch. Eruku I; St Cyprian Sch. Eruku II; Market Centre, Eruku; Open Space Oke-Ogi, Eruku; Open Space Odolomu, Eruku; Co-Operative L.G.E.A Sch Eruku I; Co-Operative L.G.E.A Sch Eruku II
Ekiti	Isapa	Open Space Odo-Ago Isapa; L.G.E.A Sch Isapa; Open Space Iberikedo Isapa; Open Space Odo-Itan Isapa; Open Space Oke-Ipo Isapa; Open Space Okesa/Mission
Ekiti	Koro	Comm Sch Koro; Health Centre Koro; Market Centre Koro
Ekiti	Obbo-Aiyeggunle 1	Open Space Ekela; Open Space Ilemesin; Open Space Ajiu; Open Space Obbo-Oke; Open Space Oke-Owa
Ekiti	Obbo-Aiyeggunle 11	Open Space Ilemo Obbo-Aiyegunle I; Open Space Ipetu Obbo-Aiyegunle II; Open Space Ilawe 1 Obbo-Aiyegunle; Open Space Ilawe 11 Obbo-Aiyegunle; Open Space Iwodi Obbo-Aiyegunle
Ekiti	Obbo-Ile	Town Hall, Obbo-Ile; Market Centre, Obbo-Ile; Open Space Ilawe Obbo-Ile; St Luke's Lgea Obbo-Ile; Open Space Ora Obbo-Ile
Ekiti	Osi 1	S. D. A Sch, Osi; Ekiti Local Govt Vocational Centre, Osi; New Shopping Complex, Osi; Open Sapace Ile Ohun, Osi; Magistrate Court, Osi; New Post Office, Osi; Agbara Market, Osi; Town Hall, Osi
Ekiti	Osi 11	St Bridge's Sch, Osi; Area Court, Osi; Open Space Odore-Oke, Osi; Old Postal Agency; Comm Lgea Sch Osi; Open Space Igbo-Ogo, Osi
Ekiti	Opin	L.G.E.A Sch, Ikerin I; L.G.E.A Sch, Ikerin II; L.G.E.A Sch, Isolo-Opin I; L.G.E.A Sch, Isolo-Open II; L.G.E.A Sch, Epe-Opin I; L.G.E.A Sch, Epe-Opin II; L.G.E.A Sch, Isare I; L.G.E.A Sch, Isare II; L.G.E.A Sch Ajuba; Health Centre, Owa Otun; L.G.E.A Sch, Idera; L.G.E.A Sch, Araromi Opin; Open Space Aare
Ekiti	Oke-Opin/Etan	Central L.G.E.A Sch, Oke-Opin; Town Hall, Oke-Opin; Open Space Olowi's Compd, Oke-Opin; Open Space Adetifa, Oke-Opin; Health Centre, Oke-Opin; St Patrick L.G.E.A Sch Etan; Market Centre, Etan; Open Space Health Centre, Etan
Ifelodun	Oke-Ode 1	Ecwa Sch Oke-Ode; Arabic Sch Oke-Ode; Comm Sch Oke-Ode; Town Hall Oke-Ode; Oke Ago Oke-Ode; Maternity Oke-Ode; Open Space Idiapa Oke-Ode; Ile Elemosho Oke-Ode; Local Govt Dispensary; Quranic Sch Oke-Ode
Ifelodun	Oke-Ode 11	Ecwa Sch Shagbe I; Ecwa Sch Shagbe II; Ecwa Sch Agbee I; Ecwa Sch Agbee II; Comm Sch Ajegunle; Comm Sch Bankole; Comm Sch Ologorun; Market Square Alawon Alasoro; Comm Sch Famole; Comm Sch Alabe-Oja; Comm Sch Ologomo
Ifelodun	Oke-Ode 111	Comm Sch Alade; Comm Sch Labaka Idera; Comm Sch Asungbale; Comm Sch Dabu Oroki; Comm Sch Eleiyele; Ecwa Sch Labaka-Oja; Comm Sch Omi-Aro; Comm Sch Gbede
Ifelodun	Ile-Ire	Comm Sch Babanla; Council Hall Babanla; Open Space Ilendeji Babanla I; Open Space Ilendeji Babanla II; Local Govt Dispensary Oke-Oyan; Ecwa Sch Alabe I; Ecwa Sch Alabe II; Ecwa Sch Idera I; Ecwa Sch Idera II; Comm Sch Ikosin; Comm Sch Owode I; Comm Sch Owode II; Town Hall Kajola; Comm Sch Owa Onire; Comm Sch Oreke; Comm Sch Ganmu; Comm Sch Budoidowu; Market Square Idoba/Obinn Ayetoro; Comm Sch Afin
Ifelodun	Agunjin	Comm Sch Agunjin; Council Hall Agunjin; Ecwa Sch Olayinka; Comm. Sch., Oree; Ecwa Sch Agbeku; Market Square Agbeku; Comm Sch Amori Wande; Ecwa Sch Patako
Ifelodun	Oro-Ago	Ecwa Sch Oro-Ago; Comm Sch Oro-Ago; Comm Sch Oke-Ayin; Ecwa Sch Oyate; Open Space Ahun Village; Ecwa Sch Okedaba; Comm Sch Omugo; Comm Sch Irabon; Comm Sch Okedio; Comm Sch Ajegunle; Comm Sch Ajegunle/Owa; Comm Sch Oke-Owa; Open Space Aiyetoro; Adult Sch Oyate
Ifelodun	Omupo	Comm Sch Omupo; St Michael Sch Omupo; Arabic Sch Omupo; Sheik Islamic Sch Omupo; Arabic College Omupo; Comm Sch Amodu; Govt Tech Sch Amodu; Comm Sch Koko; L.G.E.A Sch Koko; Wesley Sch Okanle; Comm Sch Basanyin; Ansarul Islam Sch Igbowu; Comm Sch Maloko; Comm Sch Oko-Ode; Comm Sch Zulu; Comm Sch Obaloyan; L.G.E.A Sch Arugbo; Open Space Atanda Nda Aliyu
Ifelodun	Share 1	Comm Sch Share; Ile Bale Ojabutu Share; Ile Garba Soja Share; Shayo L.G.E.A Sch Share; Area Court Share; Ile Onibi Share; Ile Bale 11 Share; Ile Adebiopon Share
Ifelodun	Share 11	N. Y. S. C Bus Stop Share; Ile Abologbon Share; Ile Oluloke Share; Ile Adeyi Share; Ile Agun Share; Open Space Motor Park Share; Ile Olowolaiyemo Share; Town Hall Share; Ile Aiyegbo Share
Ifelodun	Share 111	Katalagbon Open Space; Open Space Titalagolo; Market Square Loma; Comm Sch Loma; Agun Area Loma; Open Space Arusa Loma; Open Space Olabalu Loma; Open Space Awuwo Loma; Open Space Fadeyi Loma
Ifelodun	Share 1v	Open Space Gbogilemu; Comm Sch Okose; Council Hall Loma; Ile Oluode Loma; Open Space Odeniyi Area Loma; Open Space Onipe Area Loma; Open Space Afari Area Loma; Open Space Malete Area Loma
Ifelodun	Share V	Open Space Faje Village; Comm Sch Share Junction; Open Space Sekun Village; Comm Sch Lakanla; Comm Sch Alegongo; Comm Sch Temidire; Comm Sch Sangotayo/Budo Umoru; St Martin's Sch Adio; Comm Sch Ilupeju; Comm Sch Alera
Ifelodun	Igbaja 1	Market Square Igbaja; Ecwa Sch Igbaja; Comm Sch Igbaja; Jamaat Sch Igbaja; Baptist Sch Igbaja; Open Space Isale Igbaja; Ile Balogun Igbaja; Ecwa Dem Sch Igbaja
Ifelodun	Igbaja 11	Comm Sch Offarese; Comm Sch Adanla; Comm Sch Alaka; Comm Sch Alasoro; Comm Sch Atiran; Comm Sch Ilupeju; Comm Sch Balogun Oja; Jamat Sch Idiapa; Comm Sch Onijo
Ifelodun	Igbaja 111	Comm Sch Yaru; Market Square Yaru; Comm Sch Durosoto; Open Space Masudo; Open Space Gboloko; Open Space Tongolo; Open Space Oroki Oja; Market Square Bayero; L.G.E.A Sch Ajibowo; Comm Sch Kunmi
Ifelodun	Idofian 1	Comm Sch Idofian; St John's Sch Idofian I; St John's Sch Idofian II; Council Hall Idofian; Comm Sch Jimba Oja; St Jame's Sch Falokun-Oja; Market Square Falokun; Comm Sch Alakuko; Open Space Gatta
Ifelodun	Idofian 11	Comm Sch Ganmo; Arabic Sch Ganmo; Wesley Sch Elerinjare I; Wesley Sch Elerinjare II; Wesley Sch Elerinjare III; Ecwa Sch Amayo; Open Space Amayo; Comm Sch Kabba/Dongari; Open Space Kabba/Kajola; Open Space Kabba/Owode; Open Space Gbagede
Ifelodun	Eesa Ikirun	Ecwa Sch Oke-Ode; Arabic Sch Oke-Ode; Comm Sch Oke-Ode; Town Hall Oke-Ode; Oke Ago Oke-Ode; Maternity Oke-Ode; Open Space Idiapa Oke-Ode; Ile Elemosho Oke-Ode; Local Govt Dispensary; Quranic Sch Oke-Ode
Ifelodun	Amola Ikirun	Ecwa Sch Shagbe I; Ecwa Sch Shagbe II; Ecwa Sch Agbee I; Ecwa Sch Agbee II; Comm Sch Ajegunle; Comm Sch Bankole; Comm Sch Ologorun; Market Square Alawon Alasoro; Comm Sch Famole; Comm Sch Alabe-Oja; Comm Sch Ologomo
Ifelodun	Owode Ikirun	Comm Sch Alade; Comm Sch Labaka Idera; Comm Sch Asungbale; Comm Sch Dabu Oroki; Comm Sch Eleiyele; Ecwa Sch Labaka-Oja; Comm Sch Omi-Aro; Comm Sch Gbede
Ifelodun	Isale/Oke Afo	Ecwa Sch Ora; Open Space Araromi Oke; Comm Sch Oke-Ayo; Market Square Ora; Comm Sch Manasara; Comm Sch Adigun; Open Space Balogun Village; Comm Sch Deseni; Comm Sch Aireke; Comm Sch Magbon
Ifelodun	Ikirun Rural	Comm Sch Babanla; Council Hall Babanla; Open Space Ilendeji Babanla I; Open Space Ilendeji Babanla II; Local Govt Dispensary Oke-Oyan; Ecwa Sch Alabe I; Ecwa Sch Alabe II; Ecwa Sch Idera I; Ecwa Sch Idera II; Comm Sch Ikosin; Comm Sch Owode I; Comm Sch Owode II; Town Hall Kajola; Comm Sch Owa Onire; Comm Sch Oreke; Comm Sch Ganmu; Comm Sch Budoidowu; Market Square Idoba/Obin; Comm Sch Afin
Ifelodun	Station Road, Ikirun	Comm Sch Agunjin; Council Hall Agunjin; Ecwa Sch Olayinka; Comm. Sch., Oree; Ecwa Sch Agbeku; Market Square Agbeku; Comm Sch Amori Wande; Ecwa Sch Patako
Ifelodun	Okeba Ikirun	Ecwa Sch Oro-Ago; Comm Sch Oro-Ago; Comm Sch Oke-Ayin; Ecwa Sch Oyate; Open Space Ahun Village; Ecwa Sch Okedaba; Comm Sch Omugo; Comm Sch Irabon; Comm Sch Okedio; Comm Sch Ajegunle; Comm Sch Ajegunle/Owa; Comm Sch Oke-Owa; Open Space Aiyetoro; Adult Sch Oyate
Ifelodun	Olonde Ikirun	Comm Sch Omupo; St Michael Sch Omupo; Arabic Sch Omupo; Sheik Islamic Sch Omupo; Arabic College Omupo; Comm Sch Amodu; Govt Tech Sch Amodu; Comm Sch Koko; L.G.E.A Sch Koko; Wesley Sch Okanle; Comm Sch Basanyin; Ansarul Islam Sch Igbowu; Comm Sch Maloko; Comm Sch Oko-Ode; Comm Sch Zulu; Comm Sch Obaloyan; L.G.E.A Sch Arugbo; Open Space Atanda Nda Aliyu
Ifelodun	Iba I	Comm Sch Share; Ile Bale Ojabutu Share; Ile Garba Soja Share; Shayo L.G.E.A Sch Share; Area Court Share; Ile Onibi Share; Ile Bale 11 Share; Ile Adebiopon Share
Ifelodun	Iba II	N. Y. S. C Bus Stop Share; Ile Abologbon Share; Ile Oluloke Share; Ile Adeyi Share; Ile Agun Share; Open Space Motor Park Share; Ile Olowolaiyemo Share; Town Hall Share; Ile Aiyegbo Share
Ifelodun	Obagun	Katalagbon Open Space; Open Space Titalagolo; Market Square Loma; Comm Sch Loma; Agun Area Loma; Open Space Arusa Loma; Open Space Olabalu Loma; Open Space Awuwo Loma; Open Space Fadeyi Loma
Ifelodun	Ekoende/Eko Ajala	Open Space Gbogilemu; Comm Sch Okose; Council Hall Loma; Ile Oluode Loma; Open Space Odeniyi Area Loma; Open Space Onipe Area Loma; Open Space Afari Area Loma; Open Space Malete Area Loma
Ilorin East	Agbeyangi/Gbadamu/Osin	Okaka Lgea Sch Okaka; Ajiponmi Village; Gbadamu Lgea Sch; Budo Odunbaku Sch; Aregun Lgea Sch; Agbeyangi Lgea Sch; Ode Bale Onikoko Village; Ode Magaji Oshin Village; Badi Village; Panada Lgea Sch; Adelu Village; Budo Oyo Open Space; Abangbe/Jolasun Lgea; Ode-Bale Mape Village; Ode Bale Adobasin
Ilorin East	Gambari 1	Balogun Gambari Tax Office I; Balogun Gambari Tax Office II; Opposite Ita Ajia; Open Space Masankore; Ode Kolawole I; Ode Kolawole II; Ita Magaji; Ode Ajibade; Ode Japa (Koro Tapa); Ode Ile Nla Akanlabi; Awodi Market I; Awodi Market II; Ode Ile Eleran Ita Adu; Awodi Market III; Ori Oko Awodi
Ilorin East	Balogun Gambari 11	Ode Waziri Gobir I; Ode Waziri; Infront Of Alabi Bare I; Infront Of Alabi Bare II; Karuma L.G.E.A Sch I; Karuma L.G.E.A Sch II; Adedo Lane; Ojagboro Mini Market I; Ojagboro Mini Market II; Ojagboro L.G.E.A Sch I; Karuma L.G.E.A Sch; Ojagboro L.G.E.A Sch II; Open Space Pataki; Ode Waziri Gobir II; Infront Of Alabi Bare III; Ode Shaba Pataki
Ilorin East	Ibagun	Govt. Day Sec Sch Amule I; Govt. Day Sec Sch Amule II; Ode Alawonla Okelele I; Ode Alawonla Okelele II; Infront Of Jagun Mosque; Okelele L.G.E.A Sch I; Okelele L.G.E.A Sch II; Okelele L.G.E.A Sch III; Kankatu Mini Market I; Kankatu Mini Market II; Ode Sefura Okelele; Samsudeen L.G.E.A Sch I; Samsudeen L.G.E.A Sch II; Samsudeen L.G.E.A Sch III; Ode Banigbe (Dada K); Akerebiata Open Space; Ode Ondugbe Okelele; Ode Elesin Okelele; Ode Asinleke; Ode Onitobi Idi Aro; Ode Onitobi Idiaro Area; Govt Day Sec Sch Amule; Okelele L.G.E.A Sch
Ilorin East	Apado	Famole L.G.E.A Sch; Woru L.G.E.A Sch; Apado L.G.E.A Sch; Aigoro; Aloko/Afara L.G.E.A Sch; Apado Village I; Apado Village II
Ilorin East	Iponrin	Oloro L.G.E.A Sch; Iponrin L.G.E.A Sch; Ode Bale Isamu Village; Ode Bale Alade Village; Ode Bale Budo Fulani; Ode Bale Isaje Oja Iponrin; Ode Bale Iponrin
Ilorin East	Magaji Are 1	Ode Sauta Adifa I; Ode Sauta Adifa II; Idi Ape Market I; Idi Ape Market II; Ode Baba Oro; Ode Baba Oro Gbagede; Idi Agbede Market; Ode Abudu; Ode Ile Gangan Akodudu; Ode Ile Gangan; Oke Okuta I; Oke Okuta II; Ode Daudu Amule; Ode Oba Onilu; Open Space Orisankoko I; Open Space Orisankoko II; Ode Agbadamu I; Ile Eletu I; Ode Ile Eletu; Ode Onilu Okekura; Okekura Open Space; Ode Agbadamu II; Idi Ape Market III; Ile Eletu II; Idi Ape Market IV
Ilorin East	Magaji Are 11	Alalubosa N. Maraba Garage I; Alalubosa N. Maraba Garage II; St John's L.G.E.A I; St John's L.G.E.A II; St John's L.G.E.A III; St. John's L.G.E.A IV; Govt Sec Sch Ilorin I; Govt Sec Sch Ilorin II; Govt Sec Sch Ilorin III; Opp Comm Of Police; Infront Of Kwara Hotel I; Infront Of Kwara Hotel II; Infront Of Kwara Hotel III; Infront Of Police \A\" Division I"""; Infront Of Police \A\" Division II"""; Opposite Govt House Ilorin I; Opposite Govt House Ilorin II; Opposite Govt House Ilorin III; Opposite Govt House Ilorin IV; St Barnabas L.G.E.A Sch I; St Barnabas L.G.E.A Sch II; St Barnabas L.G.E.A Sch III; St Barnabas L.G.E.A Sch IV; St Barnabas L.G.E.A Sch V
Ilorin East	Marafa/Pepele	Elesinmeta L.G.E.A Sch I; Elesinmeta L.G.E.A Sch II; Marafa L.G.E.A Sch I; Marafa L.G.E.A Sch II; Pepele L.G.E.A Sch; Budo Oba L.G.E.A Sch; Kure L.G.E.A Sch; Dalema L.G.E.A Sch; Jabi L.G.E.A Sch; Ajelende L.G.E.A Sch; Aiyetoro Ile L.G.E.A Sch; Lajolo L.G.E.A Sch; Elesinmeta Village; Marafa Village; Adanda Village; Kelebe Village; Oyo Idera Open Space; Olororo Village (Open Space)
Ilorin East	Maya/Ile-Apa	Aramonu L.G.E.A Sch; Zentu L.G.E.A Sch; Maya L.G.E.A Sch; Budo Alfa; Ode Bale Atikan; Budo Are L.G.E.A Sch; Ake L.G.E.A Sch; Oha Issa; Oha L.G.E.A Sch; Lajiki L.G.E.A Sch; Ile Adan; Alase L.G.E.A Sch; Oha Gbagi; Lajiki L.G.E.A Sch I; Lajiki L.G.E.A Sch II; Oke-Odo; Open Space Atere Village
Ilorin East	Oke Oyi/Oke Ose/Alalubosa	Oke Oyi Area Council; Ode Bode Oke Oyi; Ode Bale Oke Oyi; Oke Oyi L.G.E.A Sch; Ode Bale Idi Apa Village; Ode Bale Ipako Obo; Ode Bale Afeyin Village; Ode Bale Otefon Village; Oke Ose L.G.E.A Sch; Ode Magaji Village Alalubosa; Ode Magaji Village Gambe; Ode Bale Agboge Village; Ode Bale Abata Village; Ode Bale Ayikale Village; Ode Bale Dangii; Ode Bale Ariyibi Village; Ode Bale Apata Yakuba; L.G.E.A Sch Budo Oba; Lajolo Village; Faje Tuntun Village; Alalubosa Village I; Alalubosa Village II; Ode Bale Aiyetoro; L.G.E.A Sch Oke-Oyi
Ilorin-South	Akanbi -1	Fufu L.G.E.A Sch; Omolere L.G.E.A Sch; Open Space Ajoko; Infront Olota's Palace; Open Space Ilota Aiyetoro; Open Space Apaola Bale's House; Open Space Abelu-Bada Village; Open Space Agara Village; Open Space Olota's Palace; Open Space Apaola
Ilorin-South	Akanbi -11	Open Space Kajola Village; Omode L.G.E.A Sch; Open Space Magaji Village; Joromo Oshin L.G.E.A Sch I; Oje L.G.E.A Sch; Open Space Alaya Village; Open Space Isokun Village; Joromo Oshin L.G.E.A Sch II
Ilorin-South	Akanbi -111	Opolo L.G.E.A Sch; Open Space Alangwa Gaa Akanbi; Open Space Gbenle Press; Open Space Adjacent Deeper Life; Open Space Ebenezer Nur/Pry Sch I; Open Space Ebenezer Nur/Pry Sch II; Oke Ogun Health Centre; Agbabiaka L.G.E.A Sch; Open Space Pipeline Junction Gaa Akanbi; Open Space Iyan-La's House I; Besides Iyan-La's House; Open Space Ero Omo Atikekere; Open Space Odo-Eri Rd Gaa Akanbi; Open Space Budo Agbanka; Open Space Ita Ayisa Village; Open Space Budo Olu Lande; Open Space Onireke Village; Open Space Budo Salako; 'Danialu L.G.E.A Sch; Open Space Ero-Omo Garage-Offa; Open Space Ero-Omo Saw-Mill Garage; Open Space Iyan-La's House II; Open Space Alagbede Village
Ilorin-South	Akanbi -1v	Unilorin Main Campus I; Unilorin Main Campus II; Open Space Unilorin Staff Qtrs; Open Space Budo Jalala; Open Space Min Of Health Fate I; Open Space Opp. Min Of Health Fate II; Tanke L.G.E.A Sch Aleniboro I; Tanke L.G.E.A Sch Aleniboro II; Tanke L.G.E.A Sch Aleniboro III; Open Space Min Of Health Fate III; Open Space Opp Min Of Health Fate IV; Tanke Govt Day Sec Sch I; Tanke Govt Day Sec Sch II; Open Space Budo Ajanaku Village; Open Space Budo Lawani; Open Space River Basin I; Open Space River Basin II; Odofin Junction Basin Rd I; Odofin Junction Basin Rd II; Fate L.G.E.A Sch I; Fate L.G.E.A Sch II; Open Space Budo Masudo; Open Space Budo Bolorunduro; Open Space De-Fashion Institute; Ago-Aiyekale L.G.E.A Sch
Ilorin-South	Akanbi -V	Kangile L.G.E.A Sch; Open Space Budo Gbagba; Open Space Gaa Osibi; Fed Training Centre Kulende I; Fed Training Centre Kulende II; Fed Training Centre Kulende III; Fed Training Centre Kulende IV; Infront Of Serikin Hausawa Kulende; Opp Serikin-Hausawa Kulende I; Opp Serikin-Hausawa Kulende II; Open Space Oke Andi; Open Space Ajegunle Area I; Open Space Ajegunle Area II; Open Space Alaparun; Ansarul-Islam Ogidi; Fed. Government College Ogidi; Kulende L.G.E.A Sch; Open Space Sobi Alagbado; Open Space Low Cost Housing Oloje
Ilorin-South	Balogun-Fulani I	Area Court Centre Igboro; Post Office Centre Igboro; Dispensary/Clinic Centre Igboro; Domestic Training Centre Igboro; Open Space Ile Olowo; Ode Saadu Laufe; Infront Of Makama's Mosque; Open Space Idi-Adan I; Open Space Idi-Adan II; Open Space Erubu Lane I; Open Space Erubu Lane II; Open Space Gbenle Press; Ode Alfa Aminu; Open Space Ile Dagbo; Open Space Asunnara; Open Space Ile Omolewa; Open Space Ita Sekun; Ode Kpatako Open Space
Ilorin-South	Balogun-Fulani 11	Open Space Ode Balogun Fulani I; Open Space Ode Balogun Fulani II; Open Space Idi Agbon; Open Space Ode Alfa Dembo; Open Space Bello Motor's House I; Open Space Bello Motor's House II; Isale Maliki L.G.E.A I; Isale Maliki L.G.E.A II; Isale Maliki L.G.E.A III; Isale Maliki L.G.E.A IV
Ilorin-South	Balogun-Fulani 111	Open Space Gbabiabidun I; Open Space Gbabiabidun II; Ode Babagiwa; Open Space Ode Olorin I; Open Space Ode Olorin II; Open Space Ode Alfa Ibeji; Govt Girls Day Sec Sch Okesuna I; Govt Girls Day Sec Sch Okesuna II; Govt Girls Day Sec Sch Okesuna III
Ilorin-South	Okaka 1	Open Space Ode Olodo Aluko I; Open Space Ode Olodo Aluko II; Open Space Ode A. K Sule I; Open Space Ode A. K Sule II; Open Space Ebu-Gada; Open Space Ode Aminu; Open Space Ode Ikokoro I; Open Space Ode Ikokoro II; Open Space Ode Opele; Ode Adeto Hunwa I; Ode Adeto Hunwa II; St Williams L.G.E.A
Ilorin-South	Okaka 11	Ansarul-Islam L.G.E.A Sch I; Ansarul-Islam L.G.E.A Sch II; Ansarul-Islam L.G.E.A Sch III; Ansarul-Islam L.G.E.A Sch IV; Ansarul-Islam L.G.E.A Sch V; Ansarul-Islam L.G.E.A Sch VI; Ansarul-Islam L.G.E.A Sch VII; St Macheal L.G.E.A Sch I; St Macheal L.G.E.A Sch II; St Macheal L.G.E.A Sch III; St Macheal L.G.E.A Sch IV
Ilorin-South	Oke-Ogun	Open Space Ode Akaraje; Ode Alfa Edun; Ode Ile Nma; Ode Akano Alege; Ode Magaji Oke-Ogun I; Ode Ayipo; Ode Ile Otefun; Ode Falokun; Ode Maigida Edun; Ode Labala; Ode Magaji Ajanaku; Ode Alege; Ode Magaji Oke Ogun II
Ilorin-West	Adewole	Ode Ologbin; Ode Olodo Adewole; Adeta L.G.E.A Sch; Idi Igba Open Space; Sakele Open Space; Oke Agodi Open Space; Kuntu L.G.E.A Sch; Gaa Aremu Open Space; Government High Sch I; Government High Sch II; Federal Staff Pry Sch; Adewole Health Centre; Ojude Elefo; Oke Agodi; Open Space Ojude Olode Okuta (Kuntu)
Ilorin-West	Ajikobi	Ode Balogun Ajikobi I; Ode Balogun Ajikobi II; Ode Alagbe; 'Ode Elesinla; Ode Opobiyi I; Ode Opobiyi II; Ode Saura (Agbaji) I; Ode Saura (Agbaji) II; Ode Akinlanso I; Ode Akinlanso II; Ode Koto (Popo Giwa); Ode Oniguguru; Ode Alaro (Alore); Ode Arowasi; Ode Aribi/Idi-Isin; Ode Oyan; Solagberu L.G.E.A Sch; Abata Asunkere; Ode Okubiyi I; Ode Okubiyi II; Ode Opobiyi III; Ansaru-Islam L.G.E.A Sch I; Ansaru-Islam L.G.E.A Sch II; Ode Abojumeji; Ode Alagbede I; Ode Alawiye I; Ode Alawiye II; Ode Mogaji Abemi; Ode Elesin Were; Ode Ajibaye; Ode Asileke; Ode Alagbede II; Ode Elesinla; Ode Alawiye III; Ansarul-Islam L.G.E.A Sch III; Ode Ajibaiye; Ansarul-Islam L.G.E.A Sch IV; Ansarul-Islam L.G.E.A Sch V
Ilorin-West	Baboko	Ode Alikali (Yidi Road); Ladipo House Frontage (Yidi Rd); Infront Of Magajin-Ngari Clinic; Ode Omo (Eruda)_; Ode Magaji Baboko; Ode Sariki Fawa (Alapata); Ode Ajido; Ode Ojodu; Ode Bayero; Ode Elegbede; Ode Imam Ijeta (Baboko); Ode Onitanganran I; Ode Onitanganran II
Ilorin-West	Badari	Ecwa L.G.E.A Sch I; Ecwa L.G.E.A Sch II; Ode Bilewu; Ilorin Teacher's College I; Agbo-Oba Ilorin I; Agbo-Oba Ilorin II; College Of Education; University Of Ilorin I; University Of Ilorin II; Bunmi Nursery/Pry Sch; Ode Mafolaku; Agbo Oba Ilorin III; Ecwa L.G.E.A Sch III; Ilorin Teacher's College II; University Of Ilorin III
Ilorin-West	Balogun Alanamu Central	Ode Balogun Alanamu I; Ode Balogun Alanamu II; Ode Oloyin (Ita Elepa); Anifowose (Okekura); Ode Onija; Ode Ajia; Ode Eleta; Ode Elelu; Ode Onimago; Ode Baba Oro Abata; Ode Zeni; Ode Elesinfunfun; Ode Karatu; Ode Kuranga (Olomoda); Ode Ebo Daniyan; Ode Ikolaba; Ode Olodo (Kudima); Ode Olomo I; Ode Olomo II; Ode Alfa Iwo; Ode Apabiekun; Hiwanu L.G.E.A Sch I; Ode Akota Oke; Ode Aiyibasan I; Ode Aiyibasan II; Ode Akuji; Ode Baba Olori; Ode Eleja Adabata; Pakata L.G.E.A Sch; Ode Kobe; Ode Isowo; Ode Gbagirimajo; Ode Olokoba Popo-Giwa I; Ode Olokoba Popo-Giwa II; Ode Epo; Ode Onila; Idi Araba Kudima; Ode Anifowoshe Oke Kuka; Ode Oganija; Ode Ajia Sakasaka; Ode Baba Oro Adabata; Oke Kuranga Popo Olomoba; Hiwanu L.G.E.A Sch II
Ilorin-West	Magaji Ngeri	Ode Isiaka Omoba; Are Ogele Oriokoh; Koro Gurumoh; Ode Jimba I; Ode Amuda Omo-Iya; Ode Alikali Sokoto; Ode Kawu Agaka; Ode Dongari; Ode Galadima; Infront Of L. G Secretariat I; Infront Of L. G Secretariat II; Infront Of L. G Secretariat III; Baptist L.G.E.A Sch I; Baptist L.G.E.A Sch II; Ode Idomi Agaka; Ode Jimba II
Ilorin-West	Oloje	Mount Carmel College I; Mount Carmel College II; Ode Opeloyeru; Govt. Day Sec Sch Alore I; Air Force Pry Sch I; Ode Onile Aro; Ode Alaseju; Ode Magaji Oloje; Mount Carmel College III; Govt Day Sec Sch Alore II; Air Force Pry Sch II; Ode Oba Yahaya; Ode Oniyan Elelu
Ilorin-West	Ojuekun/Zarumi	Ode Mogaji Ojuekun I; Ode Mogaji Ojuekun II; Ode Okubi I; Ode Okubi II; Ode Agara; Ode Adigbongbo I; Ode Adigbongbo II; Ode Nageri I; Ode Nageri II; Ode Elesinla (Oke Apomu); Ode Kure (Popo Igbona); Ode Olori; Ode Tuntun (Popo Igbona); Ode Karebu; Ode Koto; Ode Olomo Mesan; Ode Ojibara I; Ode Ojibara II; Ode Baba Onila; Ode Asileke; Ode Afase; Ode Oguntolu; Ode Fara; Ode Sofun; Ode Ago Olowo; Abayomi Market; Ojude Sarumi; Ojude Bature; Ode Ora Baba; Ile Koto; Ode Elesinla; Ojude Alfa Nla
Ilorin-West	Oko-Erin	Omidoyin Stadium Area I; Omidoyin Stadium Area II; Queen Sch Ilorin I; Ilorin Grammar Sch I; Ilorin Grammar Sch II; Ilorin Grammar Sch III; Ilorin Grammar Sch IV; Osere Junction; United L.G.E.A Sch I; United L.G.E.A Sch II; Ansarul L.G.E.A Sch I; Ode Magaji Odokun; Odota L.G.E.A Sch I; L.G.E.A Sch Gaa Imman; Joro Village; Wesley L.G.E.A Sch; Infront Of Coca Cola; Baba Ode Village; Olorunsogo Open Space; Ile-Alhaji Idi-Opoto Osere; Quenn Sch Ilorin II; Ansarul L.G.E.A Sch II; Odota L.G.E.A Sch II; Ode Magaji Aiyetoro
Ilorin-West	Ubandawaki	Ojude Ubandawaki; Ojude Aladire; Govt Girls' Day Sec Sch Pakata; Oke Ebo L.G.E.A Sch; Ode Alaya; Barakat L.G.E.A Sch; Madi Village; Anifowose Open Space
Ilorin-West	Warrah/Egbe Jila/Oshin	Ogundele L.G.E.A Sch; Warrah L.G.E.A Sch; Eru-Oba/Abeokuta; Galadima Village; Gba Gba Village; Airforce Qtrs; Egbejila Village; Obanisua L.G.E.A Sch; Odore Village; Iwante Village; Budo Nuhu Village; Budo Olohunlade; Idi-Egun/Aleniboro I; Idi-Egun/Aleniboro II; Oshin Aremu L.G.E.A; Budo Kawu; Apata-Olu Village; Elepa Village; Ita-Alamu; Budo Kangusu; Budo Latunji; Budo Nuhu; Open Space Gerewu; Open Space Idiegun
Irepodun	Ajase Ipo 1	Old Police Station Ajase-Ipo; Ile Bale Ajase-Ipo; Muslim Primary Sch Ajase-Ipo; Old Igbaja Garage Ajase-Ipo; Baptist Primary Sch Ajase-Ipo; Nepa Office Ajase-Ipo; Eleyoka/Falokun; Town Centre Memudu; Oko Awo Comp. Okeya; Comm Pry Sch Okeya; Maternity Centre Ilala; Near Oba's Palace Ilala; Central Market Ilala; Ecwa Sch Buhari; Open Space At Eggi; Bale's Compd Apata/Kajola
Irepodun	Ajase Ipo 11	L.G.E.A Sch Agbonda; Ile Obaloke Agbonda; Near Oba's Palace Agbonda/Adigun; Ajenipa's Qtrs Sanmora; L.G.E.A Sch Sanmora; St Paul's Sch Agbamu I; St Paul's Sch Agbamu II; Health Centre Agbamu; Ile Bale Igbonla; Aganju Igbonla; L.G.E.A Sch Omido; Central Market Omido; Near Oba's Palace Ajengbe; Olota's Compd Isale-Iju Iludun; Central Market Egudu
Irepodun	Arandun	Home Econs Centre Arandun; Ile Awure Arandun; Oju-Oja Arandun; Ile Oki Arandun; Kaa Agan Arandun; Ile Olupo Junction Arandun; Ile Oba Ilufemiloye Arandun; Isale Ola Arandun; Ile Oba Buoye Arandun; Oke Aran Village; Owode Village; Ominrinrin Village; Ajebandele Village; L.G.E.A Sch Arandun
Irepodun	Esie/Ijan	Ile Oba Esie; Ile Osolo Esie; St Michael Sch Esie; Ile Ojomu Okeasanlu Esie; Ile Aro Esie; L.G.E.A Sch Ijan; Old Pry Sch Ijan; L.G.E.A Sch Agbele
Irepodun	Ipetu/Rore/Aran-Orin	L.G.E.A Sch Ipetu; Basic Health Centre Ipetu; L.G.E.A Sch Rore; Ile Aro Rore I; Ile Edu Rore II; Ile Oba Rore III; Rore Junction Aranorin; United L.G.E.A Sch Aranorin; Igbesi Comp Aran-Orin; Oke-Oje Compound Aran-Orin; Ile Asanlu Aran-Orin; New Market Aran-Orin; Town Hall Aran-Orin; L.G.E.A Sch Olomi-Oja; Open Space Alomilogba Compound Rore
Irepodun	Omu-Aran 1 (Aran)	Ile Olupo Oke Omu-Aran I; Ile Olupo Odo Omu-Aran II; Mode Compound Omu-Aran; Adekun Compound Omu-Aran; Okesan Compound Omu-Aran; Oke Apa Compound Omu-Aran; Ile Ade/Odo-Opin Omu-Aran; Oke Ajah Omu-Aran; Ile Otan Omu-Aran; St Paul's Sch Omu-Aran; Ile Arogun/Amule Omu-Aran
Irepodun	Omu-Aran 11 (Ihaye)	Ile Elemo Afin Omu-Aran; Ile Edemo Omu-Aran; Raba Comp. Omu-Aran; Ile Ayomu Igangu Omu-Aran; Ora Comp. Omu-Aran; Oke Esa Comp Omu-Aran; Ikoja Comp Omu-Aran; Ecwa Sch Orolodo Omu-Aran; Ita Buoye Gbeleje Omu-Aran; Ilaro Comp Omu-Aran; Ecwa Sch Aganmo Omu-Aran; Opposite F. G. G. C Omu-Aran
Irepodun	Omu-Aran 111 (Ifaja)	Ile Olasankale Omu-Aran; Ile Oro Omu-Aran; Ile Asanlu Omu-Aran; Ile Oba Omu-Aran; Ita Okore Omu-Aran; Ita Oloye Ijoko Omu-Aran; Odo Oro Gbagida Omu-Aran; S. D. A Imolekere Omu-Aran; New Market Area Omu-Aran; Area Commander Office Omu-Aran; L.G.E.A Sch Okegbala Omu-Aran; Ekan Garage Omu-Aran; Ile Nla Ile Oba Omu-Aran
Irepodun	Oro 1	Afin Oloro Okerimi Oro; St Peter's Sch Okerimi Oro; Ile Ayedun Okerimi Oro; Ile Bale Iddo Oro; Near Town Hall Ijomu Oro; Ile Bale's Comp Ijomu Oro; Muslim Sch Ijomu Oro; Ayetoro Ijomu Oro; Ile Baa Ijomu Oro; L.G.E.A Sch Sie/Olorunsogo
Irepodun	Oro 11	Ile Bale Oro; St Andrew Sch Oro; Ile Onijala Oro; Muslim Sch Oro; Near General Hospital Oro; Muslim Sch, Okeola Oro; Ile Bale Oke Ola Oro; Muslim Sch Agbeola Oro; Ile Bale Iludun Oro; Ile Alape Iludun Oro; St James Sch Iludun Oro; Ansarul L.G.E.A Sch, Iludun Oro
Irepodun	Oko	Ile Oba Oko; Market Centre Oko; Ile Petu Oko; L.G.E.A Sch Oko; Adult L.G.E.A Sch Inishan; Ita Odoko Oko
Irepodun	Olobu 'A'	Old Police Station Ajase-Ipo; Ile Bale Ajase-Ipo; Muslim Primary Sch Ajase-Ipo; Old Igbaja Garage Ajase-Ipo; Baptist Primary Sch Ajase-Ipo; Nepa Office Ajase-Ipo; Eleyoka/Falokun; Town Centre Memudu; Oko Awo Comp. Okeya; Comm Pry Sch Okeya; Maternity Centre Ilala; Near Oba's Palace Ilala; Central Market Ilala; Ecwa Sch Buhari; Open Space At Eggi; Bale's Compd Apata/Kajola
Irepodun	Olobu 'B'	L.G.E.A Sch Agbonda; Ile Obaloke Agbonda; Near Oba's Palace Agbonda/Adigun; Ajenipa's Qtrs Sanmora; L.G.E.A Sch Sanmora; St Paul's Sch Agbamu I; St Paul's Sch Agbamu II; Health Centre Agbamu; Ile Bale Igbonla; Aganju Igbonla; L.G.E.A Sch Omido; Central Market Omido; Near Oba's Palace Ajengbe; Olota's Compd Isale-Iju Iludun; Central Market Egudu
Irepodun	Olobu 'C'	Home Econs Centre Arandun; Ile Awure Arandun; Oju-Oja Arandun; Ile Oki Arandun; Kaa Agan Arandun; Ile Olupo Junction Arandun; Ile Oba Ilufemiloye Arandun; Isale Ola Arandun; Ile Oba Buoye Arandun; Oke Aran Village; Owode Village; Ominrinrin Village; Ajebandele Village; L.G.E.A Sch Arandun
Irepodun	Olobu 'D'	Ile Oba Esie; Ile Osolo Esie; St Michael Sch Esie; Ile Ojomu Okeasanlu Esie; Ile Aro Esie; L.G.E.A Sch Ijan; Old Pry Sch Ijan; L.G.E.A Sch Agbele
Irepodun	Bara 'A'	L.G.E.A Sch Ipetu; Basic Health Centre Ipetu; L.G.E.A Sch Rore; Ile Aro Rore I; Ile Edu Rore II; Ile Oba Rore III; Rore Junction Aranorin; United L.G.E.A Sch Aranorin; Igbesi Comp Aran-Orin; Oke-Oje Compound Aran-Orin; Ile Asanlu Aran-Orin; New Market Aran-Orin; Town Hall Aran-Orin; L.G.E.A Sch Olomi-Oja; Open Space Alomilogba Compound Rore
Irepodun	Bara 'B'	Ile Olupo Oke Omu-Aran I; Ile Olupo Odo Omu-Aran II; Mode Compound Omu-Aran; Adekun Compound Omu-Aran; Okesan Compound Omu-Aran; Oke Apa Compound Omu-Aran; Ile Ade/Odo-Opin Omu-Aran; Oke Ajah Omu-Aran; Ile Otan Omu-Aran; St Paul's Sch Omu-Aran; Ile Arogun/Amule Omu-Aran
Irepodun	Elerin 'A'	Ile Elemo Afin Omu-Aran; Ile Edemo Omu-Aran; Raba Comp. Omu-Aran; Ile Ayomu Igangu Omu-Aran; Ora Comp. Omu-Aran; Oke Esa Comp Omu-Aran; Ikoja Comp Omu-Aran; Ecwa Sch Orolodo Omu-Aran; Ita Buoye Gbeleje Omu-Aran; Ilaro Comp Omu-Aran; Ecwa Sch Aganmo Omu-Aran; Opposite F. G. G. C Omu-Aran
Irepodun	Elerin 'B'	Ile Olasankale Omu-Aran; Ile Oro Omu-Aran; Ile Asanlu Omu-Aran; Ile Oba Omu-Aran; Ita Okore Omu-Aran; Ita Oloye Ijoko Omu-Aran; Odo Oro Gbagida Omu-Aran; S. D. A Imolekere Omu-Aran; New Market Area Omu-Aran; Area Commander Office Omu-Aran; L.G.E.A Sch Okegbala Omu-Aran; Ekan Garage Omu-Aran; Ile Nla Ile Oba Omu-Aran
Irepodun	Elerin 'C'	Afin Oloro Okerimi Oro; St Peter's Sch Okerimi Oro; Ile Ayedun Okerimi Oro; Ile Bale Iddo Oro; Near Town Hall Ijomu Oro; Ile Bale's Comp Ijomu Oro; Muslim Sch Ijomu Oro; Ayetoro Ijomu Oro; Ile Baa Ijomu Oro; L.G.E.A Sch Sie/Olorunsogo
Irepodun	Elerin 'D'	Ile Bale Oro; St Andrew Sch Oro; Ile Onijala Oro; Muslim Sch Oro; Near General Hospital Oro; Muslim Sch, Okeola Oro; Ile Bale Oke Ola Oro; Muslim Sch Agbeola Oro; Ile Bale Iludun Oro; Ile Alape Iludun Oro; St James Sch Iludun Oro; Ansarul L.G.E.A Sch, Iludun Oro
Irepodun	Elerin 'E'	Ile Oba Oko; Market Centre Oko; Ile Petu Oko; L.G.E.A Sch Oko; Adult L.G.E.A Sch Inishan Oko; Ita Odoko Oko
Isin	Alla	Market Centre Open Space; L.G.E.A Sch Oponda; Owode Kajola Open Space; Ile Oba, Alla Open Space
Isin	Edidi	St Andrew L.G.E.A Sch; Bale's Area Open Space; Market Centre Open Space; Ile-Loke Open Space
Isin	Isanlu 1	Ile-Loke Isanlu Open Space; St Joseph's L.G.E.A Sch; Aiyetoro Open Space; Baptist L.G.E.A Sch; Market Centre Eleyin; Odogbo Open Space; Ile Ologba Area
Isin	Isanlu 11	Ile Agbasin Open Space; Market Centre Open Space; Oke-Epa Open Space; Maternity Centre; Aiyede Open Space; Igbagbotedo Open Space; Ile Olomujo Open Space
Isin	Ijara	Oke Igunsin Open Space; Market Centre Open Space; Baptist L.G.E.A Sch; Bale's Area Open Space; Old Court Open Space; Ile Olusin Open Space; Ile Nla Open Space; Ajegunle Open Space; Ofatedo Open Space
Isin	Iwo	Ile Oba Open Space; Comm Lgea School; Ile Nla Open Space; Oke-Ope Open Space; Maternity Centre Open Space I; Maternity Centre Open Space II
Isin	Owu Isin	Court Area Open Space; Ile Oba Owu Open Space I; Ile Oba Owu Open Space II; Lgea Sch Owu; Lgea Sch Iji-Isin I; Lgea Sch Iji-Isin II; Market Centre Kudu; Market Centre Oyi
Isin	Oke Onigbin	Garage Oke Onigbin Open Space; All Saints, Lgea Sch; Odo-Igbesi Open Space; Court Area Open Space; Igbesi Lgea Sch; Adigun Open Space
Isin	Sabaja/Pamo	Pamo Lgea Sch; Oba-Isin Lgea Sch; Sabaja Open Space
Isin	Oke Aba	Oke Aba Lgea Sch; Odo Eku Lgea Sch; Bale's Area Odo Ore; Magaji Olokin Open Space; Oke Aba Town Hall; Odo-Eku Market Centre; Idi Agbede Oke Aba; Oke Aba Market Centre
Kaiama	Adena	Klgea Sch Adena; Klgea Sch Dada; Klgea Sch Kosa; Gbajibo Open Space
Kaiama	Bani	Bani Klgea Sch; Zango Market, Bani; Olokotintin Klgea Sch; Fonlo Open Space; Bani-Olori Klgea Sch; Kaagbona Klgea (Nom. Sch); Famini Klgea Sch; Oguniyi Open Space
Kaiama	Gwanabe 1	Kanikoko Pry Sch I; Kanikoko Pry Sch II; Venra Klgea Sch; Woro Klgea Sch; Tunga Maja Pry Sch; Nukuzi Klgea Sch; Gorobani Open Space
Kaiama	Gwanabe 11	Gwattekuta Klgea Sch; Tunga-Aboki Klgea Sch; Sopere Klgea Sch; Korokun Open Space; Tunga Atiku Darusalam (Ns); Owode Nom. Sch
Kaiama	Gwari A (Gwaria)	Gwaria Klgea Sch; Mozhi-Gada Klgea Sch; Gwaria-Wuzi Klgea Sch; Apata Welewele Klgea Sch; Nomadic Sch, Gorodege; Gate Klgea Sch
Kaiama	Kaiama 1	Central Pry Sch, Kaiama; Nrc Secretariat, Kaiama I; Nrc Secretariat, Kaiama II; Kpakpen Open Space
Kaiama	Kaiama 11	Mow Camp Demonstration Sch; Nassarawa Open Space; Kulingizin Islamiya Old Sch; Gbanagizi Klgea Sch; Osiwera Viewing Centre, Kaiama; Klgea Sch, Sabon-Ngari
Kaiama	Kaiama 111	Kabaru Open Space; Post Office, Kaiama; Zango Open Space; Oga-Saani Open Space
Kaiama	Kemanji	Kibenfadi Klgea Sch; Kpedezin Klgea Sch; Babete Nomadic Sch; Tenebo Klgea Sch
Kaiama	Wajibe	Shiri-Gwaria Klgea Sch; Kugiji Klgea Sch; Banisula Klgea Sch; Karo Camp, Klgea Sch; Karo Camp Market Square; Bezira Klgea Sch; Nanu Klgea Sch
Moro	Jebba	Umca Idi Agbon Jebba; St Theresa Sch Jebba; Waiting Room, Railway Station; Berger Market; Ansarul Islam Sch; Labour Camp Jebba; Lgea Sch Onipako; Lgea Sch Iyana, Bacita; Lgea Sch Morafa; Lgea Sch Fangan; Lgea Sch Adekanbi
Moro	Bode-Saadu	Viewing Centre Bode-Saadu; Comm Pry Sch Bode-Saadu; Lakanla Village; Lgea Sch Lasaki Fala; Gatta Village
Moro	Okemi	Lgea Sch Okemi; Lgea Sch Adio Lanwa; Lgea Sch Olowode; Lgea Sch Maya
Moro	Lanwa	Lgea Sch Lanwa; Lgea Sch Elebu; Gbodi Village; Lgea Sch Budo-Ode; Elemosho Village; Govt. Sec Sch Lanwa
Moro	Ejidongari	Lgea Sch Ejidongari; Lgea Sch Agogo; Lgea Sch Magaji Ogunbo; Lgea Sch Olokiti Nla
Moro	Okutala	Lgea Sch Okutala; Lgea Sch Bi-Elesin; Lgea Sch Amoo; Lgea Sch Ladojo; Lgea Sch Oloko; Open Space Jowa-Idisin
Moro	Babadudu	Lgea Sch Oguntulu; Lgea Sch Igbo-Emu; Lgea Sch Sheji; Lgea Sch Jodoma; L.G.E.A Sch Agbaku-Eji; L.G.E.A Sch Babadudu; Open Space Igbira
Moro	Oloru	L.G.E.A Sch Oloru; L.G.E.A Sch Ogun-Edun; L.G.E.A Sch Mama; Open Space Kanbi; Secondary Sch Oloru
Moro	Pakunmo	Maternity Dispensary Budo-Oke; L.G.E.A Sch Obada; L.G.E.A Sch Pakunmo; Apoya Village; Moleke Village; Open Space Abamba
Moro	Womi/Ayaki	L.G.E.A Sch Elemere; L.G.E.A Sch Adio; L.G.E.A Sch Apata Oloni; L.G.E.A Sch Abeya; L.G.E.A Sch Animaje; Zuru Village
Moro	Abati/Alara	L.G.E.A Sch Tepatan; L.G.E.A Sch Ara; L.G.E.A Sch Budo Are; L.G.E.A Sch Kiribi; L.G.E.A Sch Eleko-Yangan
Moro	Shao	S. D. A Sch Shao; L.G.E.A Sch Shao; Oke Sinniga Shao; Town Hall Shao; I. A. D. P Shao; Ode Alawon Shao; Maternity Centre Shao
Moro	Logun/Jehunkunnu	L.G.E.A Sch Jeunkunnu; Karibuje Village; Budo-Abo Village; L.G.E.A Sch Olowu
Moro	Malete/Gbugudu	L.G.E.A Sch Malete; L.G.E.A Sch Busamu-Adu; L.G.E.A Sch Gbugudu; L.G.E.A Sch Okete-Jagodo
Moro	Ajanaku	L.G.E.A Sch Budo Are; L.G.E.A Sch Agbaku; L.G.E.A Sch Paku; L.G.E.A Sch Agar
Moro	Megida	L.G.E.A Sch Ipaiye; L.G.E.A Sch Babaloke; L.G.E.A Sch Oloworu; L.G.E.A Sch Alagbo; L.G.E.A Sch Aberejo; L.G.E.A Sch Agbaku
Moro	Arobadi	L.G.E.A Sch Arobadi; L.G.E.A Sch Gudu; L.G.E.A Sch Adara; L.G.E.A School Primary Odonigi; L.G.E.A Sch Awuyan
Offa	Balogun	Open Space Tidi Bogede L.G.E.A; Open Space Balogun Market; Open Space Arowosodun Area; Open Space Idi-Isin Area; Open Space Ajoda Area; Open Space A. U. D Area; Open Space Iyeru-Okin L.G.E.A I; Open Space Iyeru-Okin L.G.E.A II; Open Space Akingbasa Area; Open Space Amoko Comp
Offa	Shawo South West	Open Space Adeola Junction; Open Space Near Igbonna Mosque Area; Open Space Freedom Hotel Area; Open Space Omo-Owo Area; Open Space, St Cyprian Sch I; Open Space, St Cyprian Sch II; Open Space, Afolarin Area; Open Space, Kanmonu Alayin
Offa	Shawo Central	Open Space, Bolude Area; Open Space, Oganla Area; Open Space, Anbe Area; Open Space, Akosin Area; Open Space, Alubata Area; Open Space, Popo Market; Open Space, Ajia Area; Open Space, Ikolaba Area
Offa	Shawo South East	Open Space, Are Onilu Area; Open Space, Oluwe Area; Open Space, Elepa Area; Open Space, Idi Ogun Area; Open Space, Beleore Area; Open Space, Okin Cinema Area; Open Space, Sakosi Junction
Offa	Essa - A	Open Space, Oniju Area; Open Space, Obadaboye Area; Open Space, Akinlofi Area; Open Space, Opposite Olofa's Gate; Open Space, Arole Area; Igbo-Oro Health Centre
Offa	Essa - B	Open Space Ona-Ara Bakery; De-Crown Restraurant [sic] Oloya Area; Open Space Oloyabanleku Area; Open Space Sajiku Area; Open Space Essa Square
Offa	Essa - C	Open Space Odiwo Area; Open Space Oluawo Area; Idi-Ogun Sawmill Area; Open Space Alape Area; Baptist Lgea Itafa; Open Space O. D. U Secretariat I; Open Space O. D. U Secretariat II
Offa	Ojomu North/North West	Open Space Ist Baptist L.G.E.A; Open Space Agun Baptist L.G.E.A; Open Space Adeleke Road; Open Space Muu Road; Open Space O. G. S; Open Space Oluolo; Open Space Prince Motel; Open Space Post Office; Open Space Ogakunrin Area
Offa	Ojomu Central 1	Open Space Eso Baba Alata; Open Space Ejisun Area; Open Space Children Welfare; Open Space Anadowo Area; Open Space Alagure Area; Open Space Ola Isale Area
Offa	Ojomu Central 11	Open Space Obatiwajuoye Area; Open Space Asalofa Area; Open Space Oladodo Area; Open Space Eso Pataki Area; Open Space St Thomas L.G.E.A
Offa	Ojomu South East	L.G.E.A Wesley Sch; Opposite Ist Baptist Church Surulere; Ita Aponbi Bus Stop; Open Space Ita Erin Area; Open Space Esinkin Area; Open Space Gedegbe Area; Open Space Oganran Area; Open Space Arojojoye Area; Open Space Opeloyeru Area I; Open Space Opeloyeru Area II
Offa	Igboidun	Igboidun L.G.E.A; Igbawere L.G.E.A; Open Space Gbosun Ogbondoroko; Open Space Pandoro; Open Space Ajegunle
Oke - Ero	Aiyedun	Market Centre I; Market Centre II; Ijelu Centre I; Ijelu Centre II; Ile Ala; Adodo; Ode Ede
Oke - Ero	Ekan	Eri Egun; Open Space Afin; Idera Road; Oke Ilegun; Ile Tara; Odo-Owa; Ile-Agbedu; Oke-Okin; Ajure
Oke - Ero	Imoji/Ilale/Erinmope	Comm L.G.E.A Sch Imoji; Comm L.G.E.A Sch Ilale; Market Centre Erinmope; Odo Oye Ilale
Oke - Ero	Iloffa	Jamat L.G.E.A Sch; Old Market; Irepe Compound; Oke Ipo I; Oke Ipo II; St John C.A.C Sch I; St John C.A.C Sch II
Oke - Ero	Imode/Egosi	Egosi Town Hall; Idi-Ekiti; Oke-Owa/Oko-Oru; Oke-Aro Compound; Bolorunduro
Oke - Ero	Idofin Igbana 1	Adult L.G.E.A Sch; Court Premises; Market Centre; St Paul L.G.E.A Sch; Odoloke Compound; Odo-Agbede Compound
Oke - Ero	Idofin Igbana 11	Motor Park; Area Office; Odo-Ose Compound; Koba; Kade
Oke - Ero	Idofin /Odo-Ashe	L.G.E.A Sch Ayekale; Market Centre Ehinafo; Comm L.G.E.A Sch Ehinafo; Ile Olukose Ayekale; Ile Alaye Odo Aga; Oke Mapo/Makurdi I; Oke Mapo/Makurdi II; Police Station
Oke - Ero	Odo-Owa 1	Afin Compound; Arinrin Compound; Ikotun Compound; C.A.C L.G.E.A Sch; Adult L.G.E.A Sch; St Thomas Pry Sch; Igbede Compound
Oke - Ero	Odo-Owa 11	Ipekun Compound; Igbinlo Compound; Igbira Compound; St Joseph Pry Sch; Temidire (Yasola)
Oyun	Erin-Ile South	Baptist Lgea Sch, Erin-Ile; Erin-Ile Garage; Opposite Police Station, Erin-Ile; Magistrate Court, Erin-Ile; Muslim Sch, Erin-Ile; Ago Iwoye
Oyun	Ilemona	Lgea Sch, Ilemona; Lgea Sch, Adinimodo; Isaoye; Lgea Sch Reke; Ajoko; Court Area, Ilemona
Oyun	Igbona	Town Hal, Igbona; Lgea Sch, Igbona; Eleku; Kere-Aje Lgea Sch; Bolorunduro Lgea Sch; Agbara Lgea Sch; Open Space Isale Igbona, Eleku
Oyun	Irra	St Peter's Lgea Sch, Irra; Infront Of Ojomu's Compound, Irra; Irra Grammar Sch, Irra; Infront Of Aro's Compound, Irra; Muslim Lgea Sch, Irra
Oyun	Inaja/Ahogbada	Lgea Sch, Inaja Maliki; Lgea Sch, Inaja Alaro; Ilobu - Kajola; Lgea Sch, Ahogbada; Lgea Sch, Sanni Ode; Lgea Sch, Afijagba
Oyun	Ikotun	Ikotun Court Frontage; Ansarul-Islam Lgea Sch, Ikotun; Lgea Sch Falokun/Fade; Gudugba/Oke-Oye; Lgea Sch Igbotele; Agbamu
Oyun	Ojoku	Muslim Lgea Sch, Ojoku; Infront Of Onidun's Comp, Ojoku; Infront Of Gboye's Comp, Ojoku; Opposite Council Hall, Ojoku; Wesley Lgea Sch, Ojoku; Lgea Sch, Awoniyi; Muslim Sch, Isale Idera
Oyun	Ijagbo	Baptist Lgea Sch, Ijagbo I; Baptist Lgea Sch, Ijagbo II; Post Office, Ijagbo; A. U. D Lgea Sch, Ijagbo; Lgea Sch Adeleke
Oyun	Igosun	Infront Of Onilu's Comp, Igosun; Old Market Igosun; Beside Nepa Office, Igosun; Muslim Lgea Sch, Igosun; Ago Idera; Infront Of Olu-Ode's Comp, Igosun
Oyun	Ipee	Muslim Lgea Sch, Ipee; Baptist Lgea Sch, Ipee; Central Market, Ipee; Budo Aiyekale; Lgea Sch, Ajoko; Budo-Alfa; Ibgs Junction, Oriwo
Oyun	Erin-Ile North	Open Space Olowe; St Mathias Lgea Sch, Erin-Ile I; St Mathias Lgea Sch, Erin-Ile II; Ebenezer Lgea Sch, Erin-Ile; Infront Of Oloba's Comp, Erin-Ile; Infront Of Okiki's Comp, Erin-Ile; Surajudeen Lgea Sch, Erin-Ile
Patigi	Patigi 1	Basic Health Centre; Central Office; Central School; Rest House; S.I.M School
Patigi	Patigi 11	Efungunzhi Open Space; Gboke Lgea Sch I; Gboke Lgea Sch II
Patigi	Patigi 111	Dispensary Centre; Public Health Open Space; Tsadu's Gate; Mamannawo's Gate
Patigi	Patigi 1v	Edogi Lgea Sch; Ella Lgea Sch; Gbadokin Lgea Sch; Gbaradogi Lgea Sch; Godiwagi Lgea Sch; Mawogi Open Space; Tswatagi Lgea Sch
Patigi	Kpada 1	Basic Health Centre; Duro Lgea Sch; Emiworogi Lgea Sch; Gakpan Lgea Sch; Gulugi Lgea Sch; Kajita Lgea Sch; Kpada Market Square; Kpada S.I.M Sch; Tsaban Lgea Sch; Wako Lgea Sch
Patigi	Kpada 11	Echiwada Lgea Sch; Egwamama Lgea Sch; Ezighiko Open Space; Fey Lgea Sch; Guluka Lgea Sch; Koro Lgea Sch; Kusogi C. S. S; Rogun Lgea Sch
Patigi	Kpada 111	Agboro Lgea Sch; Rifun Lgea Sch; Tamkpafu Lgea Sch; Matokun Lgea Sch
Patigi	Lade 1	Bongi Lgea Sch; Chitta Lgea Sch; Gbadashaba Lgea Sch; Magya Lgea Sch; Sunkuso Lgea Sch; Sanchita Open Space
Patigi	Lade 11	Lade Central Lgea Sch; Dina Lgea Sch; District Office Lade; Rani-Ndako Lgea Sch; Tsuba Lgea Sch; Cottage Hospital
Patigi	Lade 111	Edogi-Chappa Lgea Sch; Dzako Lgea Sch; Lalagi Lgea Sch; Lata Lgea Sch; Sakpefu Lgea Sch; Wodata Lgea Sch
