= Bashira (disambiguation) =

Bashira is a 2021 U.S. horror film based on a Japanese legend.

Bashira may also refer to:

== Places ==
- Bashera (also spelled "Bashira"), Punjab, Pakistan; a village
- Bashira, Okuta, Baruten, Kwara, Nigeria; see List of villages in Kwara State

== People and characters ==
- Bashira Mannan, mother of Bangladeshi diplomat Mosud Mannan
- Bashira Nasser, a Bahraini runner, record holder in the women's 100m and gold medalist at the 2016 Arab Junior Athletics Championships

=== Characters ===
- Bashira, a fictional character, an Afghan girl, from the 2013 UK TV show Our Girl
- Bashira, a fictional character, the son of Shabbiran, from the 2017 Pakistani TV show Zamani Manzil Kay Maskharay
- Bashira, a fictional character, the father of Anya, from the 2018 Pakistani film Teefa in Trouble (Urdu: طیفا اِن ٹرَبل)
- Bashira Kincaid, a fictional character from the 2001 US horror film Ghosts of Mars

== Arts, entertainment, media ==
- Bashira (film), a 1996 Bangladeshi film produced by Mizu Ahmed and directed by Montazur Rahman Akbar
- Bashira (Arabic: بشارة, lit. 'Good News'), a newspaper from Fallujah, Iraq; see Mass media in Iraq

== Other uses ==
- The dictionary definition of 柱 at Wiktionary (Japanese: bashira, hashira, lit. 'pillar')
