= Aran-Orin =

Town in Kwara State, Nigeria

Coordinates: 8°04′56″N 5°04′14″E

Aran-Orin is a town in Irepodun local government area of Kwara State, Nigeria. It originated from Ile-Ife. It is a border town located very close to Osun State and Ekiti State to the west and south respectively. Aran-Orin is about 8 kilometres (5 mi) from Omu-Aran the local government headquarters. Other towns in close proximity are Arandun, Rore, Ipetu, Erinmope and Ilale all in Kwara State. Ora-Igbomina is the closest town in Osun State.

Oil deposits were discovered in Aran-Orin in 2011.

Aran Orin has a group of elected indigenes that help the royal council in administering the affairs of the town. The group is called Aran Orin Progressive Union (APU). The body consists of democratically elected representatives by the indigenes of the town. The town is known to be an igbomina speaking community, one of the Yoruba version languages.

The current executive body is headed by Elder Sunday Oyedepo, an accomplished business man, also hails from Irese compound of the town.
