= Okanle =

- Village
- Location in Nigeria
- Coordinates: 8°19′0″N 4°42′0″E
- Country: Nigeria
- State: Kwara State
- LGA: Ifelodun LGA

Government
  - Oba of Okanle: HRH Ismaila Tunde Dawodu Kosolu 8

Population
  - Ethnicity: Yoruba
- Time zone: UTC+1 (WAT)
- Website: http://www.kwarastate.gov.ng/

Okanle is a village in Ifelodun Local Government of Kwara State, Nigeria. The Okanle Village Area Council was established in 1956 with other seven villages that included Fajeromi, Irapa, Basanyin, Arugbo, Surulere, Amberi (Okanle Descendant Union [ODU], 2009: 3). Okanle and Fajeromi are both located in Ifelodun Local Government of Kwara State. Okanle is less than 2 km away from Fajeromi. The villages are about 30 km from Ilorin along Offa/Ajase Ipo Road and exactly 6 km from Idofian town. Although a number of people engage in buying and selling as well as craftsmanship farming remains the primary source of livelihood. Household income is usually generated from farm produce as well as buying and selling. The communities are rich in forest resources hence the majority of the people derive their livelihood from the forests through hunting and farming. Apart from providing sources of income to the local people, forest resources are also used to maintain wellbeing, which are readily available in their natural forms. Knowledge about local medicines is usually handed down from generation to generation in oral form.

Like many other rural areas in Nigeria, the people of Okanle and Fajeromi have limited access to basic social amenities including health care facilities. The roads leading to both communities from both Arugbo and Idofian are not tarred and as a result difficult to traverse. The only community health centre that served the people was established in 1978 through the initiatives of both communities. The facility has however been taken over the State Government.
