= Asa, Kwara State =

Asa
- LGA
- Interactive map of Asa
- Location within Nigeria
- Coordinates: 8.3°N 4.5°E
- Country: Nigeria
- State: Kwara
- Headquarter: Afon

Government
  - Local Government Chairman and the Head of the Local Government Council: M.B. Yahaya

Area
  - Total: 1,286 km^{2} (497 sq mi)

Population (2006)
  - Total: 126,435
- Time zone: UTC+1 (WAT)
- Postal code: 240
- Website: http://www.kwarastate.gov.ng/asa/

Asa is a local government area in Kwara State, Nigeria. The Asa local government secretariat is located in the town of Afon. The Asa local government area contains several towns and villages which include Afon, Ogbondoroko, Laduba, Aboto, Balah, Eyenkonrin, Pampo, Ogele, Olowokere, and Aboto Alfa.

It has an area of 1,286 square kilometres (497 mi^{2}) and had a population of 126,435 at the time of the 2006 census. Islam is the primary religion practiced, while ethnic groups such as the Yoruba, Hausa, and Fulani are represented in the area.

The postal code of the area is 240.
