= Bashera =

- Location within Pakistan
- Coordinates: 30.46°N 73.01°E
- Country: Pakistan
- Province: Punjab
- District: Sahiwal
- Elevation: 157 m (515 ft)
- Time zone: UTC+5 (PST)
- Calling code: 0092

Bashera, also spelt Bashira, is a village in the Punjab province of Pakistan.
