= Babanloma =

Coordinates: 7.4000°N 4.3000°E

- Town
- Interactive map of Babanloma
- Country: Nigeria
- State: Kwara State
- LGA: Ifelodun
- Time zone: UTC+1 (WAT)

Babanloma is a town in Ifelodun Local Government Area of Kwara State, Nigeria.

It is situated along Ilorin-Jebba old road and bounded in the North-east by Edu L.G.A, South-East by Ilorin-East L.G.A and North-West by Moro L.G.A.

The town is about 75 km from Ilorin, the state capital, and 45 km from Jebba, a border town between kwara and Niger State.

Babanloma is known as a stopover town, especially when the major road that linked Niger State and Kwara State passed through it. It is one of the first towns in the area with infrastructures such as electricity, pipe-borne water, good road networks, primary and secondary educational institutions, health care centres and more. The town is endowed with a major Osin River, which serves the town and the surrounding towns and villages.

The people of Babanloma belong to the Igbomina extract of Yoruba tribe with their roots historically in Oyo. The traditional rulers were given the title of Loma.
