= Okuta =

Town in Kwara State, Nigeria

- Town
- Location in Nigeria
- Coordinates: 9.2199°N 3.2005°E
- Country: Nigeria
- State: Kwara State
- Local government area: Baruten

Population
  - Total: 26,589
- Time zone: UTC+1 (WAT)

Okuta is a town located in the Baruten local government area of Kwara State, Nigeria.

== Geography ==
Okuta is located about 300 km (190 mi) north of Lagos, and about 170 km (110 mi) northwest of Kwara State's capital of Ilorin. Internationally, Okuta is located around 8 km (5.0 mi) from the Beninese border.

== Ruler ==
Edidi is currently under the rulership of His Royal Majesty, Alhaji Idris Abubakar Seropetete lll as of 2019.

== Festivals ==
Festivals in Edidi include:

- Okuta Gaani Festival: Occurs annually in January/February. It is a celebration of religion, culture, and dance which brings participants from nearby countries as well as the local area.
