= Aboto Alfa =

Village in Nigeria

Coordinates: 8°10′00″N 4°34′52″E

Aboto Alfa, Kwara is an agrarian village in Asa local government Area, Kwara State, Nigeria. The postal code of the village is 240104.

== Climate ==
The village's region is Aw (tropical savanna, wet) in the Köppen climate classification.
