= Arandun =

Town in Kwara, Nigeria

- Town
- Location within Nigeria
- Coordinates: 08°05′42″N 04°56′35″E
- Country: Nigeria
- State: Kwara
- LGA: Irepodun

Area
  - Total: 1.23 km^{2} (0.47 sq mi)
- Elevation: 467 m (1,532 ft)
- Time zone: UTC+1 (WAT)
- Postal code: 251101

Arandun is a town in Irepodun LGA, Kwara State, Nigeria. It is located near the state boundary with Osun, about 66 kilometres (41 mi) southeast of the state capital Ilorin, and 18 kilometres (11 mi) southwest of the area capital Omu-Aran.

== Geography ==
Arandun is located along the Oro-Omu Ipetu Road, on the east of Omugo, south of Odun, west of Irore, and north of Ila. Its average elevation is at 467 meters (1,532 feet) above the sea level.

=== Climate ===
Arandun has a Tropical Savanna Climate according to the Köppen Climate Classification. Its wettest month is September, with an average rainfall of 282 mm (11.1 in); and the driest month is December, with an average rainfall of 7 mm (0.28 in).

Climate data for Arandun
Month	Jan	Feb	Mar	Apr	May	Jun	Jul	Aug	Sep	Oct	Nov	Dec	Year
Mean daily maximum °C (°F)	33.7 (92.7)	34.6 (94.3)	34.4 (93.9)	32.6 (90.7)	30.6 (87.1)	28.7 (83.7)	27.5 (81.5)	27.1 (80.8)	28.1 (82.6)	29.6 (85.3)	31.9 (89.4)	33.3 (91.9)	31.0 (87.8)
Daily mean °C (°F)	26.4 (79.5)	27.4 (81.3)	27.4 (81.3)	26.4 (79.5)	25.3 (77.5)	24.1 (75.4)	23.2 (73.8)	23 (73)	23.4 (74.1)	24.2 (75.6)	25.8 (78.4)	26.2 (79.2)	25.2 (77.4)
Mean daily minimum °C (°F)	20.7 (69.3)	22.2 (72.0)	23.1 (73.6)	23.1 (73.6)	22.6 (72.7)	21.7 (71.1)	21.1 (70.0)	20.8 (69.4)	21.1 (70.0)	21.5 (70.7)	22 (72)	20.8 (69.4)	21.7 (71.1)
Average rainfall mm (inches)	10 (0.4)	22 (0.9)	63 (2.5)	117 (4.6)	193 (7.6)	227 (8.9)	231 (9.1)	238 (9.4)	282 (11.1)	215 (8.5)	29 (1.1)	7 (0.3)	1,634 (64.4)
Source: Climate-Data.org
