= Isanlu Isin =

- Town
- Location in Nigeria
- Coordinates: 8°14′0″N 5°6′0″E
- Country: Nigeria
- State: Kwara State
- LGA: Isin

Government
  - Olusin of Isanlu Isin: HRM, Oba Solomon Oluwagbemiga Oloyede

Population
  - Ethnicity: Yoruba (Igbomina)
- Time zone: UTC+1 (WAT)
- Website: www.isanluisin.webs.com

Isanlu Isin or Isanlusin is an ancient town in Isin LGA of Kwara State, Nigeria. Isin LGA of Kwara State was created from the old Irepodun Local Government Area in 1996 with the headquarters at Owu-Isin. Notable towns in Isin are Isanlu Isin, Ijara Isin, Owu Isin, Iwo, Oke-Aba, Oke-Onigbin, Alla, Edidi, Odo-Eku, Oba, Iji, Pamo, Oponda, Igbesi, Eleyin, Kudu-Owode, to mention but few. Collectively, these towns are today located in Isin Local Government area of Kwara State. The present ruler of Isanlu Isin also referred to as Olusin, is Oba Solomon Oluwagbemiga Oloyede.

== Location ==
Isanlu Isin is located at Latitude 8° 14' 0" North, Lontitude 5° 5' 0" East as displayed on world map, coordinates and short location facts. To the north of Isanlu isin and Isin towns as a whole are Igbajaland, Oraland and Ireland; to the west are Ajasse Ipo and Oro; to the east are Oro Ago, Olla and Osi in Ekiti LG; while to the south are Apaland, Arandun and Omu-Aran.

Isanlu Isin Aerial view

== Chieftaincy ==
The position of chiefs in Isanlu isin is engendered by the fact that the grading and thus seniority of Chiefs and sharing of amenities is done according to when a particular chief arrive the town. Settlements with their appointed chiefs (usually the eldest or a philanthropist in the family) thus became wards in Isanlu Isin up till this day.

== Kingship ==
Oba Solomon Oluwagbemiga Oloyede is the current Olusin of Isanlu Isin (2009–present).

== Climate ==
Temperatures at Isanlu Isin will range from 21 to 29 °C.

== Tourist Attractions ==
- Atti Falls
- Agbasin Shrine
- Egungun (Masquerade) festivals
- Ijoko Water Falls
- Oba's palace and many other attractions.
- Oke Eleru(Mountain of Ashes)

== Annual festivals ==
Major festivals in Isanlu Isin include:

- Traditional festivals e.g. Egungun, Paaka, Oro, Oya, Ogun and
- New Yam Festival
- Agbasin Festival
- Isanlu-Isin Day
- Ajokogun Fiesta, which holds every 30 December yearly ever since it started.

Isanlu isin community may have abandoned many of their culture most especially the traditional festivals because of foreign religions.

== Schools and institutions ==
- Bowen University (Pre-degree campus)
- Isanlu Isin Comprehensive College
- Baptist Grammar School, Isanlu-isin
