= Ilala, Kwara State =

Ilala
- Town
- Location in Nigeria
- Coordinates: 8°20′0″N 4°51′0″E
- Country: Nigeria
- State: Kwara State
- LGA: Irepodun LGA

Government
  - Aala of Ilala: HRM, Oba AbdulFatai Oladega Talabi

Population
  - Ethnicity: Yoruba (Igbomina)
- Time zone: UTC+1 (WAT)
- Website: www.ilalacommunity.webs.com

Ilala is an ancient town in Irepodun LGA, Kwara State. It is situated in the northeastern region of Kwara State and ruled by a monarch usually referred to as Aala of Ilala. The present Aala of Ilala is HRH, Oba AbdulFatai Oladega Talabi.

== Location ==
Ilala is located at Latitude: 8° 20' 0 N, Longitude: 4° 59' 0 E on the world map. The community is 3.7 km from Okeya, 4.1 km from Buari, 5.2 km from Moloko, 5.6 km from Egi Oyopo, 7.6 km from Sulu, 7.6 km from Oko Ode, 7.8 km from Igbaja, 8.3 km from Omupo, 8.2 km from Isie, 9.2 km from Igbo Owu, 10.4 km from Adanla, 36.2 kilometres (22.5 miles) from Ilorin, the Kwara State capital and 44.3 miles from Osogbo, the Osun State capital of Nigeria (All distances by air).

Ilala comprises four distinct areas: Oke-Aala, Oke-Sunna, Isale-ta, and Isale-Ilala. The different compounds within the community falls within these areas. Ilala is in Irepodun Local Government Area of Kwara State with Aala of Ilala as the traditional ruler and other chiefs namely, Asaba, Eruwe, Aponbi, Oloko, Asaoye, Aafa, Ekose, Elemoso and Akogun.

== Eulogy of Aala ==
Omo Aala Ooo

Omo Alemu-lera

Omon Arije Ma Gbagbe Ore

Eni To Ba Moye Irawo

Lo Le Mo Bi Ti Won Bi Wa De

Omo A Dako Nibi Ekun Gbe N Reri

== Oriki ==
Different compounds/families in Ilala have different Oriki.

== Tourist attractions ==
1. Ilala day: A festival that attracts almost all the indigenes of Ilala with various activities such as traditional dance, competitions and relaxation.
2. Egungun festivals
3. Odo Osin (River) which was thought to have been a fat pretty woman before she turns to a river in Ila Orangun when she was insulted for her bareness, she flows from Ila Orangun, through Ajasse Ipo, to Ilala and many other places.
4. Afin Oba's palace

== Annual festival ==
Major festivals in Ilala include:

1. Traditional festivals such as Egungun festivals
2. Moslem festivals such as Eid Al-Fitr and Eid Al-Adha celebrations
3. Christian festivals such as Christmas and Easter
4. Ilala day

== Kingship ==
(1) His Majesty Aalaga, father of Dala
(2) His Majesty Dala :(Son of Aalaga)
(3) His Majesty Beku Ola Oyesoro
(4) His Majesty, Aribeja
(5) His Majesty, Jali
(6) His Majesty Akatakoto
(7) His Royal Highness Kehinde Adeniyi
(8) His Royal Highness Akintalaru
(9) His Royal Highness Adesina
(10) His Royal Highness Araba
(11) His Royal Highness Jolabi
(12) His Royal Highness Arandi
(13) His Royal Highness Alaleku
(14) His Royal Highness Odunlami
(15) His Royal Highness Olaleye
(16) His Royal Highness Alebiosu Atolagbe
(17) His Royal Highness Akande
(18) His Royal Highness Ibirinoye
(19) His Royal Highness Olalowo
(20) His Royal Highness Oyebamire
(21) His Royal Highness Oyedele
(22) His Royal Highness Mohammed Afolayanka
(23) His Royal Highness Abdulkadiri Aweda Ibirinoye III
(24) His Royal Highness Abdulwahab Osuolale Adeyemi
(25) The current Aala of Ilala is AbdulFatai Oladega Talabi, Arileshire II (25 August 2022 till date).

== Schools ==
1. Oyelagbawo Grammar School
2. Community L.G.E.A Primary School
3. Abiola Nursery and primary school
