= Ijara-Isin =

Town in Kwara State, Nigeria

Coordinates: 8°15′01″N 5°01′26″E

Ijara-Isin is a town in Isin Local Government Area in Kwara State, Nigeria. Isin Local Government Area of Kwara State was created from the old Irepodun Local Government Area in 1996 with the headquarters at Owu-Isin. It has an area of 633 km^{2} and a population of 59,738 at the 2006 census.

The postal code of the area is 251.

The Ijara-Isin people are stock of the Igbomina. Yoruba language is spoken in Ijara-Isin, however, the local dialect concurs as Igbomina. The founder of Ijara-Isin migrated from Oyo. However, there are some compounds in Ijara-Isin Towns whose founders migrated from outside Oyo.

Ijara-Isin town is made of the following compounds: 1. Odo-Ijara Compound 2. Okegunsin Compound 3. Ile Olusin Compound 4. Ile-Nla Compound 5. Ajegunle Compound 6. Oke-Afin Compound 7. Ofatedo Compound 8. Ile Olowu Compound

The town of Ijara-Isin has both Baale and a Royal King. The Baale is Chief Enoch Bamikole; while the Oba is by name OBA OMONIYI BANIGBE The Olusin of Ijara-Isin a 2nd Class Traditional Ruler.

Upon the demise of Oba Omoniyi Banigbe, the royal king of Ijara Isin is Oba Ademola Julius Ajibola. He is described by many as a rich, affable, humorous, and overtly generous. He succeed Oba Omoniyi Banigbe Atobatele.

He (Oba Julius Ademola) is the brain behind the Ijara Isin currency. A currency refers to a voucher that can only be spent and circulated in the township. The idea of this currency is to boost the township's economy. An idea that has since been applauded by notable economists.

Ijara Isin is a very peaceful community. The people of Ijara Isin are known for their communal living and being social.
