= Adogbajale-bi-ileke II =

Thirty-third traditional ruler of Omu-Aran

- Olomu Ibitoye as a young King, 19 February 1993

In Office: 19 February 1993 – 30 November 2017

Olomu of Omu-Aran
- Succeeded by: Abdulraheem Oladele Adeoti
- Preceded by: Suleiman Durotoye

Personal details
- Born: 28 October 1953 Omu-Aran, Igbomina Land.
- Died: 30 November 2017 (aged 64)
- Spouse: Olori (Queen) Margaret Omowumi Ibitoye
- Children: Prince Ibukun Ibitoye, Prince Oluseye Ibitoye, Prince Toyosi Ibitoye, Prince Opeyemi Ibitoye, Princess Sijuwade Ibitoye-Adetona.
- Education: BSc. Business Administration, University of Lagos

Charles Oladele Akande Ibitoye, was the thirty third traditional ruler (king) or Olomu of Omu-Aran from 1993 until his death in the year 2017. He was born into the Ruling House of Ijawusi of Ikoja Compound (28 October 1953 – 30 November 2017). He took the regnal name Adogbajale-bi-ileke II. He succeeded his forebear, Adogbajale-bi-ileke I, who was also a King (Olomu) from the Ikoja Compound of the Ijawusi Ruling House. The Ijawusi Ruling House of Omu-Aran comprises two royal compounds: Ikoja and Aafin. The Ikoja Royal Compound is also known as Olórí Arẹ̀kọ, a Yoruba term meaning, first settler, founder, or original inhabitant. Omu-Aran, which is the Head Post of Igbomina land, a town in the Nigerian state of Kwara. It originated from Ile-Ife and is the local government headquarters of the Irepodun local government. He was appointed on 1 February 1993, crowned on 19 February 1993 and was presented a first class Staff of Office on 8 May 1993 by Mohammed Sha'aba Lafiagi, Executive Governor of Kwara State, in a ceremony attended by dignitaries from across the globe.

== Early life ==
He was born into the family of Olarewaju Ibitoye and Rachael Ayodele Ibitoye on 28 October 1953. He began his academic career at the SIM/ECWA Primary School Agamo, Omu-Aran in 1960 and completed his first school leaving certificate in 1967. He proceeded to Offa Grammar School between 1968 – 1972 for his Secondary School Education. He then attended the School of Basic Studies, Kwara State College of Technology (1973-1975), and later proceeded to the University of Lagos to study Business Administration. He earned a Bachelor's Degree (BSc.) in Business Administration in 1979.

== Career ==
He started his professional career at the Kwara State Internal Revenue Directorate as a Senior Officer, where he worked until at age 39 he ascended the throne of his forefathers in the ancient town of Omu-Aran in 1993. He was a Christian Oba (King) and an Anglican, and worshiped at the Cathedral Church of St. Paul, Omu-Aran.

== Olomu of Omu-Aran: 1993-2017 ==
His reign was peaceful and recorded development educationally, socio-economically and politically. The number of both private and public colleges increased exponentially. A great landmark of his reign pertaining to education was the establishment of Landmark University founded by local resident David Oyedepo. and the foundation and construction work in progress of the Proposed Moses Orimolade University began, in 2012.

His reign attracted federal institutions and agencies. He was said to be the first educated (and a University Graduate) Oba (King) in Omu-Aran and, the first king to influence the construction of the main building of the Official and Central Palace of Olomu, called Aafin (Palace) Olomu, which remains a mainstay of Olomu to date located at Olomu Way, Omu-Aran. Oba Charles Oladele Ibitoye cosmopolitan status also recorded a daily influx of non-indigenes in the town, this has brought about huge investments in real estate, quarries, commercial farming, livestock/poultry farms, feeds and other agro-allied and manufacturing industries as his reign made the town a commercial hub of the southern part of the State.

Most of the achievements during his reign were self-help initiatives and collective efforts, especially by sons and daughters of the soil, as Omu-Aran Day and Odun Omu-Aran festival fund-raising series were inclusive. The last official function attended by Adogbajale-bi-ileke II was on 28 October 2017 at the wedding engagement ceremony of the daughter to the thirteenth President of the Senate of Nigeria, Abubakar Bukola Saraki, held at the Eko Hotel and Suites. He died on 30 November 2017.
