= Olla, Kwara State =

Town in Kwara State, Nigeria

Olla
- Town
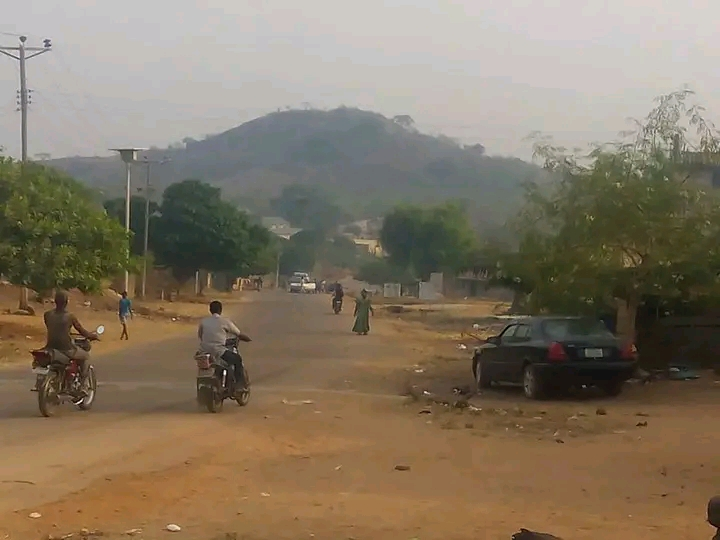
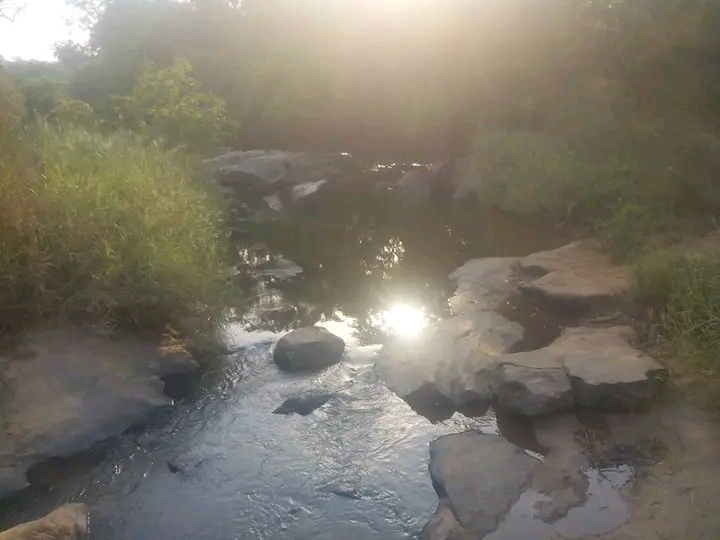
- Orokose Hill Orisa River
- Nickname: United Kingdom of Olla
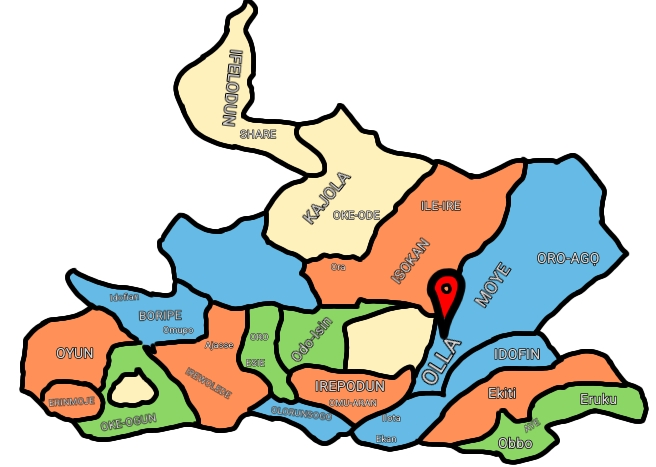
- Map of Igbominaland showing Olla
- Coordinates: 8°12′39″N 5°10′54″E
- Country: Nigeria
- State: Kwara
- Local Government Area: Isin
- Founder: Dada Arokoletiọpọn

Area
  - Total: 0.341 km^{2} (0.132 sq mi)

Population (2015)
  - Total: 2,005
  - Density: 5,880/km^{2} (15,200/sq mi)
- Demonym: Ollan
- Time zone: UTC+1 (WAT (UTC+1))
- Climate: Aw
- Website: olla.com.ng

Olla (Yorùbá: [ɔ̀là]) is an ancient Igbomina town in North Central Nigeria. It is located in the southern part of Kwara State, Isin LGA. It is a small Yoruba-speaking community bordered by other Igbomina towns such as Oko-Irese and Oro-Agọ and is about 16 km from Omu-Aran.

== Etymology ==
The word Olla comes from a blend of the Yoruba words ọ- (“nominalizing prefix”) and là (“to survive” or "to be saved").

According to folk etymology, Dada Arokoletiọpọn, the founder of Olla, also known by his praise name Agbẹdẹ Iyanju Ogun (lit. 'the war-quelling blacksmith'), was initially a resident of Ifẹ before going on exile after he lost the struggle for the vacant throne of Ooni to his younger brother. Supposedly, when his acquaintances from Ifẹ saw him again they were astonished, to which he responded "Mo là", meaning "I survived".

== Demographics ==
Historical population
Year	Pop.	±%
1975	819	—
1990	1,380	+68.5%
2000	1,699	+23.1%
2015	2,005	+18.0%
source: for Olla Agglomeration.

Population pyramid 2015
%	Males	Age	Females	%
0.3		85+		0.2
0.2		80–84		0.2
0.2		75–79		0.2
0.5		70–74		0.3
0.6		65–69		0.5
0.9		60–64		0.8
0.8		55–59		0.8
1.5		50–54		1.1
1.7		45–49		1.4
2.2		40–44		2.0
2.4		35–39		2.5
2.8		30–34		3.3
3.5		25–29		4.6
4.1		20–24		4.6
5.3		15–19		5.1
6.3		10–14		5.6
8.0		5–9		7.1
8.8		0–4		9.0

== Culture ==
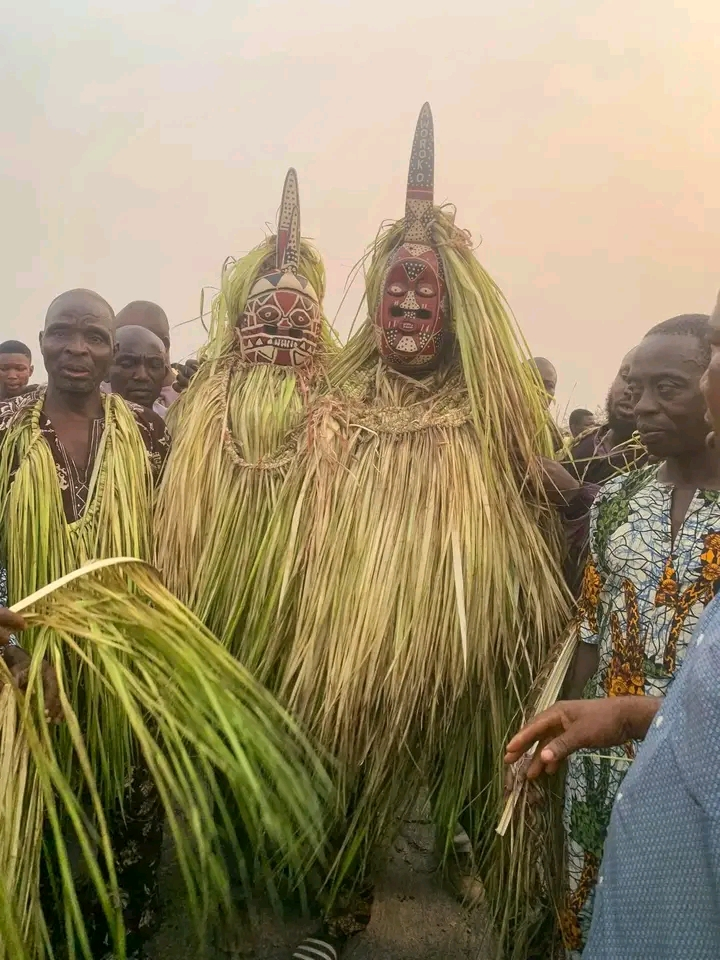
Aworoko masquerade festival

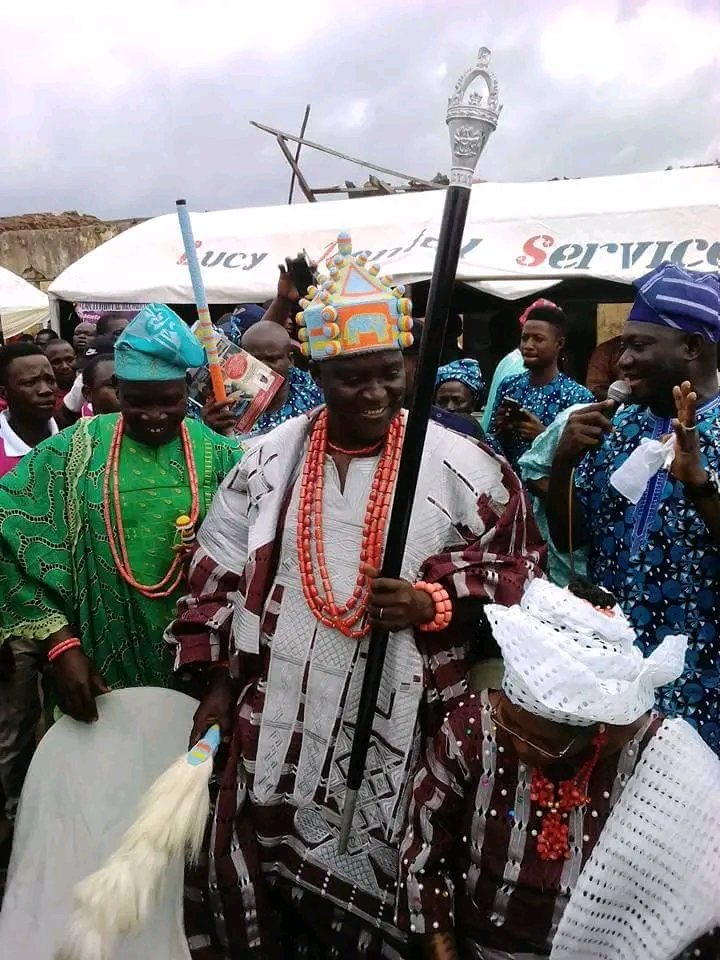
The Olola of Olla during a ceremony

=== Festivals ===
In Olla, there are several festivals that are celebrated by the residents and natives. Most of them are rooted in Yoruba culture and tradition.

==== Aworoko festival ====
The Aworoko Masquerade Festival takes place every three years. It is believed by Yoruba religious practitioners to be a period when magical beings come out and interact with the people, giving them blessings of childbearing, wealth and prosperity. The masqueraders cover their entire bodies in raffia leaves and put on decorated calabash helmets. The festival involves lots of singing, dancing and offering prayers and performing rites to the Orisha (benevolent deities). It is probably the most attended festival in Olla.

==== Other festivals ====
Apart from the Aworoko festival, other festivals held in Olla from time to time include the:

- Egungun Festival
- New Yam Festival (Ọdun Ijẹṣu)
- Sango Festival
- Ogun Festival

== Traditional rulers ==
The ruler of Olla community is referred to as the Ọlọla of Olla. His Royal Majesty, Prof. Stephen Billy Olajide, ascended the throne of Olla as the Ọlọla in August 2017, becoming the 18th recorded monarch to lead the ancient Kingdom of Olla.

According to customs, Olla community has four major ruling houses of Iketa, Odi(Odi), Ariko and Osigiri (Odo Omi). The passing of the Oba title rotates in that order. Following is the list of the Obas according to their tenure of office and their house hold in order. There is no recorded date for the first eight ancient kings.

No.	Name & Title of Ọba	Year	Ruling House
1	Ọba Owaniuntan Ollaniunkanmamo		Owa
2	Ọba Ajimuda Baba		Owa
3	Ọba Alalarugba Aseja ni Mowo		Mowo
4	Ọba Alokoniwo Alere		Ariko-Okoose
5	Ọba Ayomoniyan Olodokoayika Adawofa		Iketa-Ilaro
6	Ọba Odundun Asodedero Osupaniwaborun		Odi-Eyin Ita
7	Ọba Oporomoso		Abiti
8	Ọba Asaakubi Ojo		Odi-Odo Abata
9	Ọba Aporokubi Ogun	1743–1799	Ariko-Eyigbo
10	Ọba Alekunlogba Inaromiku	1799–1878	Ariko-Ewere
11	Ọba Agokerosu Agboluaje	1850–1878*	Iketa-Ododi
12	Ọba Amillogba Aroyinkole Osakunrin	1879–1889	Odi-Okesedo
13	Ọba Omolekeoro Omopariola	1889–1929	Ariko-Agamo
14	Ọba Ariyunkeye Apamorisegbo II	1929–1935	Abiti
15	Ọba Eyidunmoye Eminkafolawe II	1936–1945	Iketa-Ododi
16	Ọba Iṣọla Arojojoye	1945–1989	Odi-Iloba
17	Ọba Evang. J.A Ajayi Ilufemiloye Orimadegun I	26/12/1990-3/9/2013	Ariko-Agamo
18	Ọba Prof. Stephen Billy Olajide	2017–Present	

== See also ==
- List of villages in Kwara State
