= Darey Conga =

Nigerian-born percussionist (born 1998)

- Born: Qudus Oluwadamilare Rasaq; 22 May 1998 (age 28); Lagos, Nigeria
- Genres: contemporary gospel, worship
- Occupations: Percussionist; traditional performer
- Instruments: Yoruba Bata; conga; djembe; bongo; talking drum
- Years active: 2017 - till date

Qudus Oluwadamilare Rasaq (born 22 May 1998), professionally known as Darey Conga, is a Nigerian percussionist and a traditional instrumentalist. Darey has performed at gospel concerts and cultural events across Nigeria and the United Kingdom. He emerged as Cultural Drummer of the year at the Eko Heritage Awards in 2025.

== Early life and education ==
Darey Conga was born in Lagos, Nigeria, and grew up in Eti Osa Local Government Area of Lagos State. He developed an interest in percussion at an early age, influenced by traditional Yoruba music, gospel worship, and contemporary Nigerian music.

He attended Lagos State Model College, Badore, where he completed his secondary education. He started building his career in percussion in 2017 while studying Mass Communication at Kwara State University, and later graduated in 2020.

== Career ==
After graduating, Darey Conga continued his career as a percussionist. He specializes in African traditional percussion and performs on instruments, including the Bata, conga, djembe, bongo, talking drum, and drum set.

In an interview with New Telegraph, he disclosed that he draws inspiration from the likes of Don Moen, Fela Kuti, and Bob Marley.

Over the years, Darey has shared stages and worked with renowned gospel and contemporary artists, including Adedoyin Oseni, Kaestrings, Chevelle Franklyn, Bob Fits, Ajidans, Focus Strings, and Warehouse Worship.

Darey relocated to the United Kingdom and continued his career as a percussionist, performing at gospel concerts and cultural events. His work has focused on promoting Yoruba percussion traditions and African cultural heritage through live performances. Among his international performances, He appeared at the Chinese New Year Festival in Sheffield, where he performed Yoruba Bata drumming for a multicultural audience. His performances often combine traditional percussion, storytelling, and audience participation as part of an African cultural presentation.

In July 2026, Darey Conga created Tales & Rhythm, a live storytelling and percussion event in Sheffield, United Kingdom, combining traditional African percussion, storytelling, and audience participation.

== Reception ==
Darey Conga's performances have received positive attention from music critics and cultural writers.

In a 2024 review published by ThisDay, Michael Kolawole described Darey Conga's performance as drawing extensively from Yoruba folk music and traditional percussion. Kolawole noted his use of instruments, including the djembe, congas, and sẹ̀kẹ̀rẹ̀, as well as his performance of traditional Yoruba children's songs. He wrote that the repertoire emphasized the preservation of indigenous musical traditions while showcasing Darey's technical proficiency as a percussionist.

Reviewing Darey Conga's performance at the 2025 Chinese New Year Festival in Sheffield, Music critic Emmanuel Daraloye published on Independent Newspaper that his presentation showcased Yoruba Bata drumming as a form of cultural expression and exchange. Daraloye observed that the performance incorporated audience participation and Bata dance, describing it as an effort to introduce Yoruba musical traditions to an international audience while promoting African cultural heritage.

A 2026 Daily Trust review by music critic Chinonso Ihekire described Darey Conga's performance as blending Yoruba Bata drumming with storytelling and audience participation, noting its emphasis on preserving traditional percussion in contemporary settings.

== Awards and recognitions ==
In July 2025, Darey was awarded the Diaspora Cultural Drummer of the Year award at the Eko Heritage Awards held in Lagos. According to the organizers, the award recognizes his contributions to promoting Nigerian cultural music beyond the country's borders.
