= Oro, Kwara State =

Oro Town
- Interactive map of Oro Town
- Coordinates: 8.2258°N 4.8923°E

Oro is a town in Irepodun Local Government area of Kwara State, popular for its self development initiatives. It is on the main road to Omu-Aran (29 km [18 mi]); North East of Offa (24 km [15 mi]). It can be located on any good map of Nigeria on latitude 8.13°N and longitude of 4.50°E south of River Niger. Oro is a 45-minute drive from Ilorin. Oro is a Yoruba town. The people speak the Igbomina dialect of the Yoruba language.

The current Baale of Oro is Chief Sunday Olateju Afolabi.

== History ==
Most of what is known about the origin of Oro is of oral history handed down from generation to generation. According to legend, the people of Oro migrated from old Oyo as a direct consequence of chieftaincy dispute that broke out in that kingdom in the fifteenth century. A man named Olakanmi who was a prince escaped from the Royal household and led members of his family, friends and dissident warriors out of old Oyo. Olakanmi had consulted with the Ifa oracle as to where he should proceed for settlement. It was recorded that the Ifa oracle told Olakanmi to move South East of old Oyo and settle wherever he saw a lot of Igi Oro, Eiye Agbigbo and heard the sound of mortar pounding and the presence of blacksmiths with their dexterity on play of the instruments of their trade. These must be found together before Olakanmi settled. The journey took Olakanmi several weeks. He stopped at “Kanko” after a frustrating search for the objects that Ifa divined. At Kanko, Olakanmi was reported to have planted the symbol of Olofin – a Yoruba deity called Olofin’a in Igbomina dialect i.e., Olofin ti wa. Olakanmi continued his search for the ideal location and later arrived at Idofin-Odu or Moro near the present Ibode. The contingent stopped here for a while.During the sojourn at Idofin Odu, Baba Agba, a junior brother to Olakanmi, and some of his followers led an exploration party during which they discovered the sounds of mortar pounding yam. Olakanmi was excited about the report and led a party that discovered the blacksmiths, Igi Oro trees in large numbers harbouring hundreds of Eiye Agbigbo. The blacksmiths were headed by Onire. The forest where they found these trees and the Agbigbo birds was known as “Igbo Oju Iyawe.” Olakanmi declared most enthusiastically “Ibi ti Ifa ni a ro niyi – This is where the Ifa oracle foretold, we should settle.” This was how the word Oro came about. The Onire later presented kolanuts with which all worshipped Ifa oracle – called Ifa Agba. This was in appreciation of Ifa’s guidance to the predestined location, Oro. The new migrants however, met two important settlers in the location now named Oro. The Onire as we have noted was One. The Onire family claim to have migrated also from old Oyo as a result of barrenness on the part of his wives and were extremely fulfilled on getting to the location where Olakanmi met them. The Onire was blessed with children. Ajayi Onire Ajiboyede claimed to have descended from Ajiboyede one of the kings of old Oyo who reigned at Igboho. The same story was true of the Minja Oba who were reported to have moved from the oldest Oba Igbomina to the place latter called Oro because Ifa divined that until such movement was made, the Minja Oba would have no issues. Neither Onire nor the Minja Oba gave the location they sojourned the name Oro. At the founding of Oro by Olakanmi the picture looked like this: Olakanmi’s descendants – the Mokin Oro who specialized in administration, governance and reorganisation of the community they met and the one that accompanied them, these families include the Bale, Asanlu and Aro families.

== Demographics ==
The people of Oro are Yoruba of the Igbomina subgroup.
