= 2022 United States Shadow Representative election in the District of Columbia =

- November 8, 2022
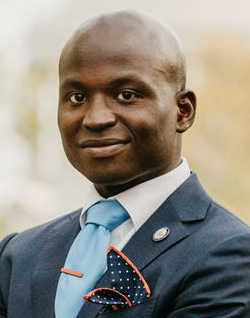

Nominee	Oye Owolewa	Joyce Robinson-Paul
Party	Democratic	DC Statehood Green
Popular vote	151,182	26,530
Percentage	83.63%	14.68%
- Owolewa: 70–80% 80–90%
Representative before election
Oye Owolewa
Democratic
Elected Representative
Oye Owolewa
Democratic

On November 8, 2022, the District of Columbia held a U.S. House of Representatives election for its shadow representative. Unlike its non-voting delegate, the shadow representative is only recognized by the district and is not officially sworn or seated. Incumbent Shadow Representative Oye Owolewa was reelected to a second term.

== Primary elections ==
Primary elections were held on June 21, 2022. In only the Democratic race did any candidates appear on the ballot because no one filed to appear in the Republican, Libertarian, or Statehood Green primaries.

=== Democratic primary ===
==== Candidates ====
===== Nominee =====
- Oye Owolewa, incumbent Shadow Representative

===== Eliminated in primary =====
- Linda Gray, Vice Chair of the DC Democratic Party

===== Did not file =====
- Kirk Hoppe
- Harry Thomas Jr., Councilperson for Ward 5 of the D.C. council (2007–2012)

==== Results ====
Democratic primary results by ward: Owolewa: Owolewa—50–60%; Owolewa—60–70%; Gray: Gray—50–60%; Gray—60–70%

Democratic primary results
Party	Candidate	Votes	%
Democratic	Oye Owolewa (incumbent)	54,317	51.95
Democratic	Linda L. Gray	48,630	46.51
Democratic	Write-in	1,614	1.54
Total votes		104,561	100
n/a	Overvotes	108	
n/a	Undervotes	23,662	

=== Republican primary ===
==== Results ====
Republican primary results
Party	Candidate	Votes	%
Republican	Write-in	689	100
Total votes		689	100
n/a	Undervotes	2,492	

=== Libertarian primary ===
==== Results ====
Libertarian primary results
Party	Candidate	Votes	%
Libertarian	Write-in	60	100
Total votes		60	100
n/a	Undervotes	59	

=== Statehood Green primary ===
Though she did not appear on the primary ballot, Joyce Robinson-Paul, who has previously been the Statehood Green nominee for this position, most recently in 2020, won the nomination through write-ins.

==== Results ====
Statehood Green primary results
Party	Candidate	Votes	%
DC Statehood Green	Write-in	287	100
Total votes		287	100
n/a	Undervotes	213	

== General election ==
In the November 8, 2022, general election, Owolewa defeated D.C. Statehood Green candidate Joyce Robinson-Paul.

=== Results ===
General election results
Party	Candidate	Votes	%
Democratic	Oye Owolewa (incumbent)	151,182	83.63%
DC Statehood Green	Joyce Robinson-Paul	26,530	14.68%
Write-in		3,053	1.69%
Total votes		180,765	100.0%

=== Results by ward ===
Ward	Oye Owolewa Democratic		Various candidates Other parties	
Ward	#	%	#	%
Ward 1	20,178	86.23%	3,222	13.77%
Ward 2	14,796	85.53%	380	2.2%
Ward 3	21,286	85.16%	3,709	14.84%
Ward 4	21,318	83.18%	4,312	16.82%
Ward 5	21,216	82.69%	4,440	17.3%
Ward 6	28,949	84.78%	5,198	15.22%
Ward 7	13,740	79.79%	3,481	20.21%
Ward 8	9,699	78.11%	2,718	21.89%
Total	151,182	83.63%	29,583	16.37%
