= Oye Owolewa =

American politician (born 1989)

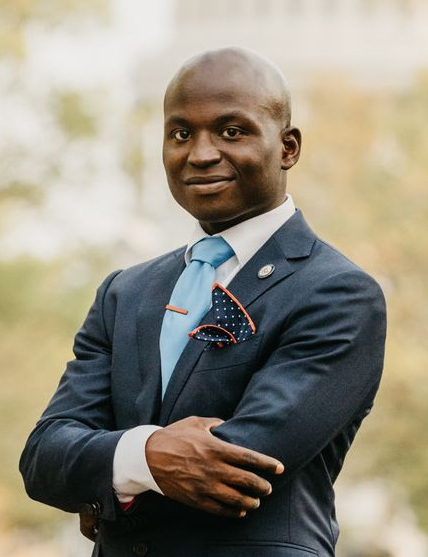

Member-elect of the Council of the District of Columbia from the at-large district
- Assuming office January 2, 2027
- Succeeding: Anita Bonds

Shadow Member of the U.S. House of Representatives from the District of Columbia's at-large district
- Incumbent
- Assumed office January 3, 2021
- Preceded by: Franklin Garcia

Personal details
- Born: Adeoye Ibrahim Yakubu-Owolewa; 1989 (age 36–37) Boston, Massachusetts, U.S.
- Party: Democratic
- Other political affiliations: Democratic Socialists of America (Note: The Democratic Socialists of America (DSA) are not a registered political party. Instead, they are a political organization for those with democratic socialist ideologies. Owolewa is a member of the Metro DC DSA chapter, but the organization did not endorse his DC Council campaign.)
- Education: Northeastern University (BS, PharmD)
- Website: Campaign website

Adeoye Ibrahim "Oye" Yakubu-Owolewa (born 1989) is an American politician, pharmacist, and member of the Democratic Party who has served as the shadow representative for the District of Columbia in the United States House of Representatives since 2021. In Congress, he is tasked with lobbying for D.C. statehood; the unpaid position was authorized by D.C. voters in 1982 but was never approved by Congress. On November 3, 2026, Owolewa was elected as a DC councilmember in an at-large position.

== Early life and career ==
Oye Owolewa was born in Boston, to a father from Omu Aran, in Kwara State, and a mother from Ilesa, in Osun State. He is the grandson of Phoebe C. Ajayi-Obe, a senior advocate of Nigeria. Owolewa was raised in Newton, Massachusetts and nearby Boston, where he attended Boston Latin School and graduated in 2008. In 2014, he earned a doctorate in pharmacy from Northeastern University and moved to Washington to practice pharmacy.

After graduating, Owolewa worked as a pharmacist. In 2017, he won the Washington DC Pharmacy Association's Cardinal GenerationRx Champions Award for his work with prescription drug abuse.

== Political career ==
In 2018, Owolewa was elected to the Ward 8, District 8E Advisory Neighborhood Commission.

=== Shadow Representative ===
In the November 2020 election, Owolewa was elected Shadow Representative for the District of Columbia.

In 2020, a special thanksgiving prayer was held on Sunday in honor of Owolewa after being elected as the U.S. Shadow Member for Columbia District by members of his family in Omu-Aran, Kwara State, Nigeria. The prayer, which was led by the Chief Imam of Omu Aran, took place at the Owolewa family compound, in Igangu, Omu Aran, headquarters of Irepodun local government area of Kwara State.

In August 2021, Owolewa criticized U.S. Senator Joe Manchin for his lack of support for D.C statehood legislation.

In May 2022, the Capital Stonewall Democrats endorsed Owolewa for the 2022 election.

In October 2025, Owolewa said he was the victim of political intimidation after "F U" was painted on his doorstep. Cameras at Owolewa's home were not working and the police were unable to identify any suspects. He said the attack was "political vandalism" that is "often used to silence those who speak truth to power."

== Political positions ==
=== D.C. Statehood ===
In an article titled "The Time Is Now For D.C. Statehood" in the Washington Socialist publication, Owolewa states that without statehood, the District of Columbia is limited in its ability to raise revenue, since all of its laws are subject to congressional approval and much of its land is federally-owned and therefore untaxed. Despite having state-like duties, from education to road maintenance, the District is explicitly barred from taxing the wages earned by non-residents who work within its borders, unlike any other state. The prohibition on such state revenue collection practices makes it hard for the District to respond to crises such as the COVID-19 pandemic. Owolewa wrote:

D.C. residents are forced into second-class citizenship in the richest nation in history. Recent events and legislation have highlighted the disparity between how Washingtonians are treated compared to everyone else. While D.C. residents pay the highest amount of federal income taxes per capita, we receive less than equal share from the government. For example, compared to our neighbors in all other states, DC received 60% less emergency aid resources from the CARES Act to combat COVID-19 and support our financial, health care, and infrastructural well-being. By denying D.C. statehood, Congress is suppressing our voting representation and say in national policy. Our lack of statehood also prohibits our right to self-govern. Once D.C. statehood is achieved, local leaders can pass legislation and set a budget without the threat of federal interference. D.C. statehood will also allow us to control our criminal justice system so we can escape a punitive structure of mass incarceration and transition to a progressive system favoring diversion programs. Last but not least, once D.C. becomes the 51st state, we will control our own resources, and President Trump would no longer be able to deploy our national guard against us when we march peacefully. The fight for D.C. statehood not only ends our nation's longest case of voter suppression but also gives residents of the nation's capital the right to live free of government control.

On January 17, 2022, Owolewa participated in the 16th annual Peace Walk in Ward 8. The focus of the Peace Walk was to urge the U.S. Senate to consider the Freedom to Vote Act of 2021 and the John Lewis Voting Rights Advancement Act. "Members of the [Martin Luther] King family support statehood, and I have seen them wear T-shirts indicating that," Owolewa said.

On March 11, 2022, at the West Virginia State Capitol in Charleston, West Virginia, Owolewa introduced a D.C. Statehood Resolution with Minority Leader Doug Skaff Jr. and State Representative Sean Hornbuckle.

=== LGBTQ rights ===
Owolewa is supportive of LGBT rights. In an article titled "Anti-trans legislation has ripple effect in D.C.", Owolewa argued that bills which make gender-affirming care more difficult to access lead to excessive spending and worse outcomes for transgender youth.

=== Advocacy ===
In May 2022, Owolewa, alongside Chef Spike Mendelsohn, co-chaired D.C's first-ever Veg Restaurant Week.

=== Climate change ===
In July 2022, Owolewa joined a campaign to protest the Supreme Court's decision to limit the Environmental Protection Agency's ability to regulate greenhouse gases and to call for more action on climate change.

== Personal life ==
Owolewa resides in Ward 8 in Southeast Washington D.C. In October 2024, he was hospitalized for a week after a serious car accident.

== Electoral history ==
2020 Shadow Representative election in Washington, D.C.
Primary election
Party	Candidate	Votes	%
Democratic	Oye Owolewa	74,101	95.8
Write-in		3,260	4.2
Total votes		77,361	100.0
General election
Democratic	Oye Owolewa	240,533	81.6
DC Statehood Green	Joyce (Chestnut) Robinson-Paul	27,128	9.2
independent (politician)	Sohaer Rizvi Syed	22,771	7.7
Write-in		4,341	1.5
Total votes		294,773	100.0
Democratic hold			

2022 Shadow Representative election in Washington, D.C.
Primary election
Party	Candidate	Votes	%
Democratic	Oye Owolewa	54,317	51.6
Democratic	Linda L. Gray	48,630	46.5
Write-in		1,614	1.5
Total votes		104,561	100.0
General election
Democratic	Oye Owolewa	140,502	83.5
DC Statehood Green	Joyce (Chestnut) Robinson-Paul	24,833	14.8
Write-in		2,875	1.7
Total votes		168,212	100.0
Democratic hold			

== Notes ==
U.S. House of Representatives
Preceded by Franklin Garcia	Shadow Member of the U.S. House of Representatives from the District of Columbia's at-large congressional district 2021–present	Incumbent
