= Orisa River =

River in North Central Nigeria

Orisa
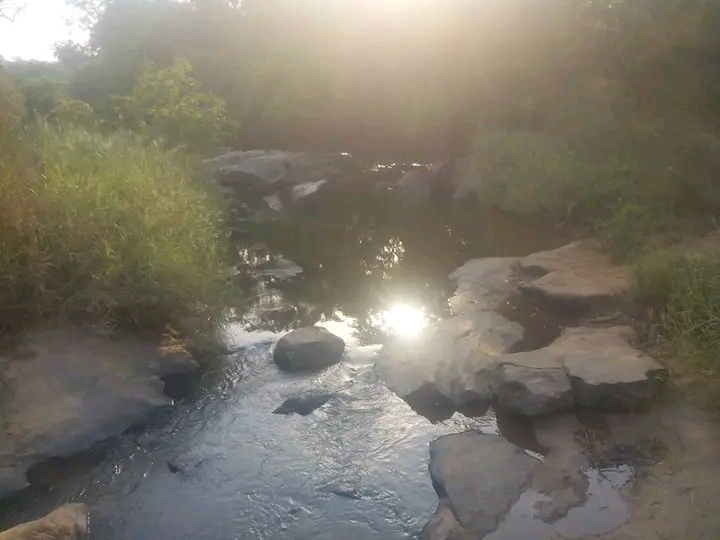
- The Orisa in Olla, Kwara State.
- Native name: Odò Òrisá (Yoruba)

Location
- Country: Nigeria

Physical characteristics
- Source
  - location: Ora-Igbomina
  - coordinates: 7°42′36″N 4°40′2″E
- Mouth
  - location: River Niger
  - coordinates: 5°33′0″N 6°33′0″E
- Length: 300 km (190 mi)

Basin features
- Progression: River Niger→ Gulf of Guinea

The Orisa River (Yorùbá: [òɾisá]) is a river in Kwara State, Nigeria. It is an alluvial river and tributary with a 300-kilometre (186mi) path originating in Ọra and flowing through various towns like Aran-Orin, Rore, Olla and Omu-Aran before draining into the River Niger.
