= Edidi =

- Town
- Location in Nigeria
- Coordinates: 8°14′N 4°56′E
- Country: Nigeria
- State: Kwara State
- Local government area: Isin

Government
- Elevation: 1,467 ft (447 m)

Population
  - Ethnicities: Yoruba (Igbomina)
- Time zone: UTC+1 (WAT)

Èdìdì is a town located in the Isin Local Government Area of Kwara State, Nigeria. The Edidi town comprises three villages: Èdìdì Ọjà, Èdìdì Òkè-Ọ̀nà and Èdìdì Ìdẹ̀ra. Edidi is located about 400 km (250 mi) northeast of Lagos and about 53 km (33 mi) south of Ilorin.

== Demographics ==
Èdìdì people are predominantly farmers growing cash crops like kola nuts, cocoa and palm oil. They are also known to be major producers of yam, cassava, maize and various other fruit. They are subject to their king, the Elédìdì of Èdìdì, assisted by high chiefs of several compounds. The town's residents are Christians and Muslims, with these groups interacting well during the celebration of religious observances and holidays. The kingship is rotated among these three villages viz: Èdìdì Ìdẹ̀ra, Èdìdì Òkè-Ọ̀nà and Èdìdì Ọjà in that order.

== Ruler ==
Èdìdì is currently under the rulerships Of His Royal Majesty, Ọba Gabriel Kọ́láwọlé Abóyèjí (Aretujoye II). He is from the House of Aretujoye of Èdìdì Ọjà and was enthroned in December 1993.

== Festivals ==
Festivals in Edidi include the following :

- Akooyi Festival
- Yam Festival
- Edidi Day Celebration
- Ojude Oba
- One Nation on Ileya Day
