= Owoicho =

Idoma given name

- Gender: Masculine
- Language: Idoma

Origin
- Origin: Nigeria
- Meaning: God
- Region of origin: Benue State

Other names
- Related names: Eghai'kowoicho, Ek'owoicho

Owoicho is an Idoma masculine given name meaning "god" and a surname of Nigerian origin. The name also appears as part of longer Idoma names such as Eghai'kowoicho and Ek'owoicho

== Notable people with the name ==
- Moses Owoicho Ogbu (born 1991), Nigerian footballer
- Kingsley Innocent Owoicho (born 1993), Nigerian gospel musician and songwriter
