= Ajasse Ipo =

- Town
- Location in Nigeria
- Coordinates: 8°16′0″N 4°48′0″E
- Country: Nigeria
- State: Kwara State
- LGA: Irepodun

Government
  - Olupo of Ajasse-ipo: HRM, Oba Ismail Atoloye Alebiosu

Population
  - Ethnicity: Yoruba (Igbomina)
- Time zone: UTC+1 (WAT)
- Website: www.ajasseipo.webs.com

Ajasse Ipo is an ancient town in Igbomina-Yoruba land of Kwara State. Ajasse Ipo is sometimes spelt as Ajase-Ipo and is also known as Ajasse or Ajasepo. It is one of the prominent towns in Irepodun Local Government Area of Kwara State. Ajasse Ipo is situated in the northeastern part of Yoruba land in northcentral Nigeria and consists of other different villages such as Eleyoka, Amberi, Falokun, Araromi etc. The present ruler of Ajasse Ipo also referred to as Olupo, is Oba Ismail Atoloye Alebiosu.

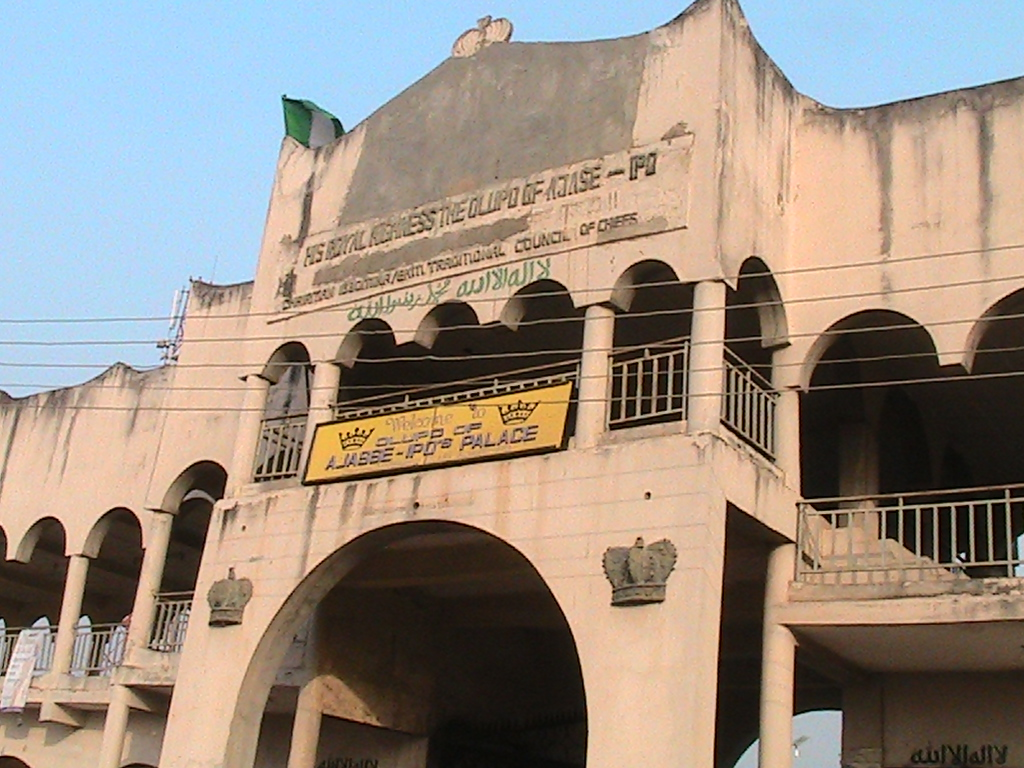
Olupo of Ajasse Ipo's palace

== Location ==
Ajasse Ipo is located at Latitude: 8° 13' 60 N Longitude: 4° 49' 0 E as displayed on world map, coordinates and short location facts. The town serves as major junction for all other major cities and towns in Kwara State, Nigeria including Ilorin (Kwara State capital), Omu-Aran (Irepodun LG Headquarter), Offa and Igbaja.

== Climate ==
In Ajasse Ipo, the dry season is hot, muggy, and partly cloudy whereas the wet season is warm, oppressive, and overcast. The average annual temperature ranges from 17 to 34 degrees Celsius or 63 to 93 degrees Fahrenheit, with lows and highs of 14 °C (57 °F) and 37 °C (98 °F) respectively.

From January 23 to April 8 is the hot season, which lasts 2.5 months and has an average daily high temperature of over 33 °C (91 °F). With an average high temperature of 33 °C (92 °F) and low temperature of 22 °C (72 °F), March is the hottest month of the year in Ajasse Ipo.

The 3.7-month cool season, which runs from June 21 to October 11, has an average daily maximum temperature of less than 29 °C (84 °F). In Ajasse Ipo, August is the coldest month of the year, with an average low of 21 °C (69 °F) and high of 27 °C (81 °F).

== Tertiary Institutions in Ajasse ipo ==
1. North South College of Health Technology, Ajasse Ipo

2. International Vocational Technical and Entrepreneurship College, Ajaase-Ipo

3. Institute of Basic and Advanced Educational Studies, Ajasse Ipo.

== Other Institutions in Ajasse ipo ==
1. Comprehensive High School Ajasse Ipo

2. Girls Day Secondary school

3. Baptist Primary School

4. Community Primary School

5. Banwo Nursery and primary school

6. Banwo College

7. Abiola Nursery and primary school

8. Abiola Standard College

9. Alade Nursery and primary school

10. Alade College

== Eulogy of Olupo ==
Emi Ni omo Olupo alelu

Molentente momu joba

Motalala mo mu joye Ni moje

Eyan ti o ba se ori Olupo pele alowo, abimo, asowo ajere

Abode pade owo aba won naa omo aba won je

Aiyewa a toro bi omi owuro pon

Omi atoro pon ko toro bi omi iyaleta

Nijo ti Olupo N womo ti ko romo

Nijo naa lo wa omo lo si idi ogan

Nigbogbo won se n je Logan Logan l’Oyo Ipo

== Oriki ==
Different compounds/families in Ajasse Ipo have different Oriki. Examples of oriki of the royal families of Ajasse ipo include:

ARIGANJOYE

Emi Ni omo Ariganjoye Baba Ronke

Kegbeyale Aremu

Oba lo dabayi, adijale Oba

Osupa Ajase, Baba Sumonu

Kosi eni ti kiwu, oko Iwaloye

Ajade ma tan ni ile Baba Yahaya

Alaburo bi eni leru Baba Aarinwoye

Timutimu ko wo inu abaa, oko Oguntomi

Omo Oniro dalagbe lohun

Odabiowo, oko Olujo.

OLUPO ONIRO [Ibrahim Ayinde]

Elewe ko jeun tan rara

Agbalagba ko tayo epe

Agba to fe ewe ni ew N fe

Agbenuke eni ti aba je ti aba mu, oun ni tobi loju eni

Aralagbe masa, Baba Abdulkadri (Ariganjoye)

Totun tosi lofin nawo, Baba Lawani (Arojojoye)

Ki ri alejo ko roju, Baba Asumowu

Ko si eni ti ki nawo fun Baba Buhari

Ti Gambari ba dele re yio fi ata panu

Ogbegbe ti gbo omo gesin

Owowo ti wo akiwi lewu

Oda yio dun fun Ajayi, oko Oderonke

Opa baba mo esin lese oko Ibijoju

Esin je ko, baba Ayinde N mi gbongan gbongan, baba Ayinde mai mi mo ko je ki esin Olayanju je oko Oba

Omo erin kole, oko oju si Igbo, efon kole oko oju si oja Oba

Oko konbi koko, oko to kankan

Onile okankan Baba Ibidere.

AJADO [Alebiosu]

Baba mi Ajado oloro

Abo bi ifa

Moso Ipo

Ebora oke odan

Ogbe agbala fohun okunrin

Agbogun lowo Baba Olaniran

Oroki Baba Magbagbe ola

Eyi tomi layo Baba Pela

Oba lomu l’Ajase, Oba biwapele

Ogbe ori iroko dajo egun Baba Oya

Alagbala a sa si Baba Ibrahim.

== Tourist Attraction ==
1. Ita oba: A festival to behold as it attracts almost all the indigenes of Ajasse Ipo with various activities such as traditional dance, competitions and relaxation

2. Odo Osin (River) which was thought to have been a fat pretty woman before she turns to a river in Ila Orangun when she was insulted for her bareness, she flows from Ila Orangun, to Ajasse Ipo, Ilala and many other places. River Osin, which runs from Ila-Orangun right into the River Niger practically encircles all the Igbomina peoples with the exception of only two or three.

3. Oba Igba: A man who did not die but reduce to a day-old baby size. Kept in a calabash, no one should look inside the calabash till date.

4. Odu Ajasse Ipo

5. Central Ifa temple

6. Afin Oba's palace beautifully built and decorated by Ex-Governor of Kwara State "Governor Mohammed Alabi Lawal".

7. Comprehensive High School Fish pound and many other attractions

== Annual Festival ==
Major festivals in Ajasse Ipo include:

1. Traditional festivals such as Egungun festivals

2. Christian festivals e.g. Christmas and Easter celebrations

3. Moslem festivals e.g. Eid Al-Fitr and Eid Al-Adha celebrations

4. Ajasse-ipo day and

5. Ita Oba: Usually comes up 3 days after Eid Al-Adha (ileya).

== Kingship ==
The present Olupo of Ajasse Ipo is Olupo Ismail Atoloye Alebiosu (21 June 2021).

The Kwara state Government, His Excellency, Governor ABDULRAMON ABDULRAZAQ administered the oath of office to the newly appointed king, HRH Oba Ismail Atoloye Alebiosu in Ajase ipo Kwara state on Thursday 24 June 2021.

His Excellency congratulates the first class monarch on his ascension to the throne and urges all Ajase Ipo indigenes to support him.

== North South College of Health Technology, Ajasse Ipo ==
North-South College of Health Technology is located along Igbo-Nla in Ajase-Ipo, Kwara State. It is a private partnership College established by the Board of Trustees/Directors of North-South Educational Investment Limited as an arm of the Educational Investment Limited in Nigeria. It was duly registered by the Corporate Affairs Commission and approved by the Government of Kwara State through the Ministry of Tertiary Education and Technology. All their programmes are recognized and goes in-line with the requirements of the appropriate health professional regulatory bodies regulating such health care profession and training in Nigeria.
