= Isin, Nigeria =

Isin
- LGA
- Interactive map of Isin
- Location within Nigeria
- Country: Nigeria
- State: Kwara State
- Headquarter: Owu Isin

Area
  - Total: 633 km^{2} (244 sq mi)

Population (2006)
  - Total: 59,738
- Time zone: UTC+1 (WAT)
- Postal code: 251

Isin is a local government area in Kwara State, Nigeria. It was created from the old Irepodun LGA in 1996 with the headquarters at Owu-Isin. It has an area of 633 km^{2} and a population of 59,738 at the 2006 census.

The postal code of the area is 251.

== Isin settlement ==
Isin comprises several towns and communities including Isanlu Isin, Iji- Isin, Ijara isin, Owu Isin, Iwo, Oke-Aba, Oke-Onigbin, Alla, Edidi, Odo-Eku, Oba, Pamo, Oloponda, Igbesi, Eleyin, Kudu-Owode, Olla etc. To the north of Isin are Igbajaland, Oraland and Ireland; to the west are Ajasse Ipo and Oro; to the east are Oro-Agọ in Ifelodun LG and Osi in Ekiti LG; while to the south are Apaland, Arandun and Omu-Aran.

== Origin ==
The Isin people are stock of the Igbomina. Although the Yoruba language is spoken in Isin, the dialect concurs with major Igbomina. They also migrated from Ife and Oyo. However, there are some Isin Towns whose founders migrated from outside these two states. Owu-Isin also migrated from Osun State and the first settlement to have a kingdom in Yorubaland.

== History ==
Investigations unto how the area came to be called “Isin” have been carried out because for many villages with diverse origin as Isin villages to bear the all binding name “Isin”, tells a lot of the importance of the name. Variously, different sources have different versions of its derivation.

Firstly, it is held that, the name was coined from “Igi Isin” (an ackee apple tree). Isin people was said to usually meet under this tree to hold general meeting of all villages.

Another source still using the ackee apple tree as the source of the name, states that Olupo of Ajase-Ipo and Aina the founder of Isanlu Isin were cured of certain decease by a diviner, who used the bark of the ackee apple tree to treat them. It was out of gratitude that Aina named Isin after the magic tree.

A third version says that when Aina got to Ade after a tedious journey, he rested under the ackee apple tree (Igi Isin), for the relieve which the tree gave him, he named the area “Isin”.

Moreover, there is a version that says Isin meant ‘escort’. It holds, that it was named because the founders of all Isin villages came together.

Others states that the area was called Isin after Esinkin Onigbonigbo a great warrior of Isanlu. He conquered many villages for Isanlu. In gratitude for this, the Olusin named the whole area Isin after him.

Yet another source says that Isin was coined from the Agbasin cult. It is held that the area of influence of the deity worshipped by the cult was named Isin, because the deity’s original name was Agba-Isin.

A last source says that it was because Aina found rest in the area, which occasioned his naming the area as ‘Isin’. To clarify this, the source said that Aina the founder of Isanlu, had troubles right from his original home in Ile-Ife. It is said that he left Ife to find peace, but met several attack on the way by the Nupes, Ibadan, Oyo and the Fulanis. When finally he got to Odo-Owa, he found that he had escaped all attacks and finally named Odo-Owa and all his acquired land around, Ile-Isimi (the land of rest). Subsequently, others who also were escaping Nupe’s onslaught came to join him at Ile-Isimi, which was later corrupted to Isin.

Among these versions, the one which seam probable is that which states that Isin was coined from the word “Ile-Isinmi” (land of rest) because Aina did experience unrest before he finally got to Igbole at Odo-Owa.

== Geography ==
The region is mostly hilly with rocky outcrops.

== Population ==
According to 2006 census isin has over 90,000 people.
