= Lagos State Model College, Igbonla =

Lagos State Model Junior College, Igbonla, Epe.
- Epe, Lagos State; Nigeria

Information
- Type: Boarding
- Motto: Education Leads to Greatness (Junior School). Creativity and Faith for Development (Senior School)
- Established: September 1988
- Founder: Lagos State Government
- Status: Open
- Area trustee: James Akinola (J. A.) Paseda
- Gender: Mixed
- Enrollment: 1000 (2016)
- Campus type: Urban
- Colours: Cream and Wine (Junior School). White and Wine (Senior School)

Lagos State Model College Igbonla is a state owned secondary school located in Epe area of Lagos State.

== History ==
It was founded in 1988, along with four other model colleges under the military administration of Captain Okhai Mike Akhigbe, the then Military Governor of Lagos state. The College which was established along with four others took off at Government College, Ketu, Epe. The other four model colleges include Kankon, Badore, Meiran and Igbokuta. From the period 1988-1992, the Colleges were given necessary foundation and focus on their mission as pacesetters in academics and co-curricular endeavours. Students at the Model College Igbonla won laurels in programmes by the Directorate of Food Roads and Rural Infrastructure (DFRRI), the All Nigeria Confederation of Principals of Secondary Schools (ANCOPSS) and several other competitions. For example, a student from the College won the ANCOPSS National Essay Competition in 1992. The foundation Principal for Igbonla, Mr. James Akinola Paseda, was also the Co-ordinating Principal for the five Model Colleges at inception in February 1988. The foundation Vice-Principal was Mrs. E. M. Akinribido.

This Igbonla College took off actively here in Igbonla in December 1989. In 2003, in the era of Senator Bola Tinubu as the Governor, the Lagos State Model College, Igbonla was divided into Junior and Senior schools with each maintaining autonomous status. The Junior School officially opened on Monday, January 6, 2003. The school is located in a village, Igbonla in the outskirts of Epe off Ijebu Ode road.

== Junior Secondary school ==
The junior section of the school was established in 2003, after the administrative partitioning of secondary schools in Lagos State.

== Senior Secondary school ==
The Senior section of the school was established in 1988 and was separated from the Junior School in 2003 after the administrative partitioning of secondary schools in Lagos State.

=== Former principals ===
- Chief James Akinola (J.A.) Paseda (Pioneer Principal, 1988-1992)
- Mr. A. O. Ricketts
- Otunba Ayobade Bayose Obajimi, National Productivity Order of Merit (NPOM)
- Mrs. Iyabode Osifeso
- Mr. Agidi Balogun Rasuki
- Mrs. Alausa T.
- Miss Apena R.T. 2014-2015
- Mr. Bolaji Oyesola 2015 - 2017
- Mr. Omotunde I.A. 2017 till date

=== Notable laurels ===
- Best Junior Secondary School (2009)
- 1st Position Best Non-Teaching staff 2016 Annual Education District III Award.
- Three students of the schools won this year (2016) American Mathematics Competition Award organised for junior Secondary schools nation.
- Second Position Best school, Junior School Category at the Annual District III Merit Award 2014.
- Recipient of Governor's Award on Lagos Eko Project outstanding Performance junior school Category in 2014.
- 14th Position in Lagos Eko Project Quiz Comp at the District level in 2014.
- Recipient of Public Secondary School Performance Award in recognition of the School outstanding Performance in the LAGOS EKO Secondary Education Project Assessment Conducted in 2014.
- Beneficiary of Lagos Power Kids Programme as Governors Award for 2013.
- The Principal of the School in 2013 was to attend International Workshop in Ghana and United Kingdom Courtesy of Governors Award on Lagos Eko Project.
- The School emerged the Second Best Junior School for the year, 2013 District 3 Merit Award.
- 2nd Best student, Junior School Category, Education District 3 Award, 2014.
- 2nd Best Principal, Junior school Category in Education District 3 Merit Award of 2013.
