= Buari =

- City
- Location in Nigeria
- Coordinates: 8.3°N 4.85°E
- Country: Nigeria
- State: Kwara State
- Time zone: UTC+1 (WAT)
- Area code: 30

Buariis a town in the Kwara State of southwestern Nigeria, inhabited by the Yoruba people. The town shares a boundary with Okeya, Egi, Ilala and Esie.
