= Oke-Onigbin =

- Town
- Location in Nigeria
- Coordinates: 8°13′0″N 5°0′0″E
- Country: Nigeria
- State: Kwara State
- Local Government Area: Isin, Nigeria
- Time zone: UTC+1 (WAT)

Oke-Onigbin is a community in the heart of the Isin Local Government Area, Kwara State, Nigeria. It is mostly inhabited by Igbomina people.

== Traditions ==
Oke-Onigbin, formerly referred to as Oke, was renamed by the Alaafin of Oyo in an era during which the town paid homage to the ruler with a basket full of snails in the dry season. The town is believed to have been named because of its abundance of snails. Thus "oke" in the Yoruba language refers to a hill or upland, while "oni" signifies possession and "igbin" means snail(s).

During the reign of Aniyaloye, the king's title changed from "Bara" to "Onigbin." In return, the Alaafin presented him with the type of traditional cap (Abeti Aja) worn by the Alaafin and a statue (Awore) wearing the same cap to immortalize the gesture.

The founder of modern Oke-Onigbin, "Baba Akoo", was said to have migrated from another Igbomina settlement known as Ikosin. This was because of a misunderstanding about who would become the next king of the town. "Baba Akoo" wanted to avoid an intertribal war. He settled in what was then Oke Igbo with his wife. He then erected a staff in front of his house, on which he typically hung his hunting pack. After moving in, Akoo's wife asked him who would be the mediator between the two of them during any quarrels as no third party was available. He said to his wife that if she ran to the staff during a quarrel, he would no longer touch her. The staff is now referred to as "Igi Dudu". That is the origin of the phrase "Igi Dudu Keta Opo," which means "Igi Dudu makes up the third person," referring to the staff's role as the third party in the event of an argument between Akoo and his wife. After many years of living together, they were joined by one of the in-laws from Ora, who was the Aros in Aro's compound.

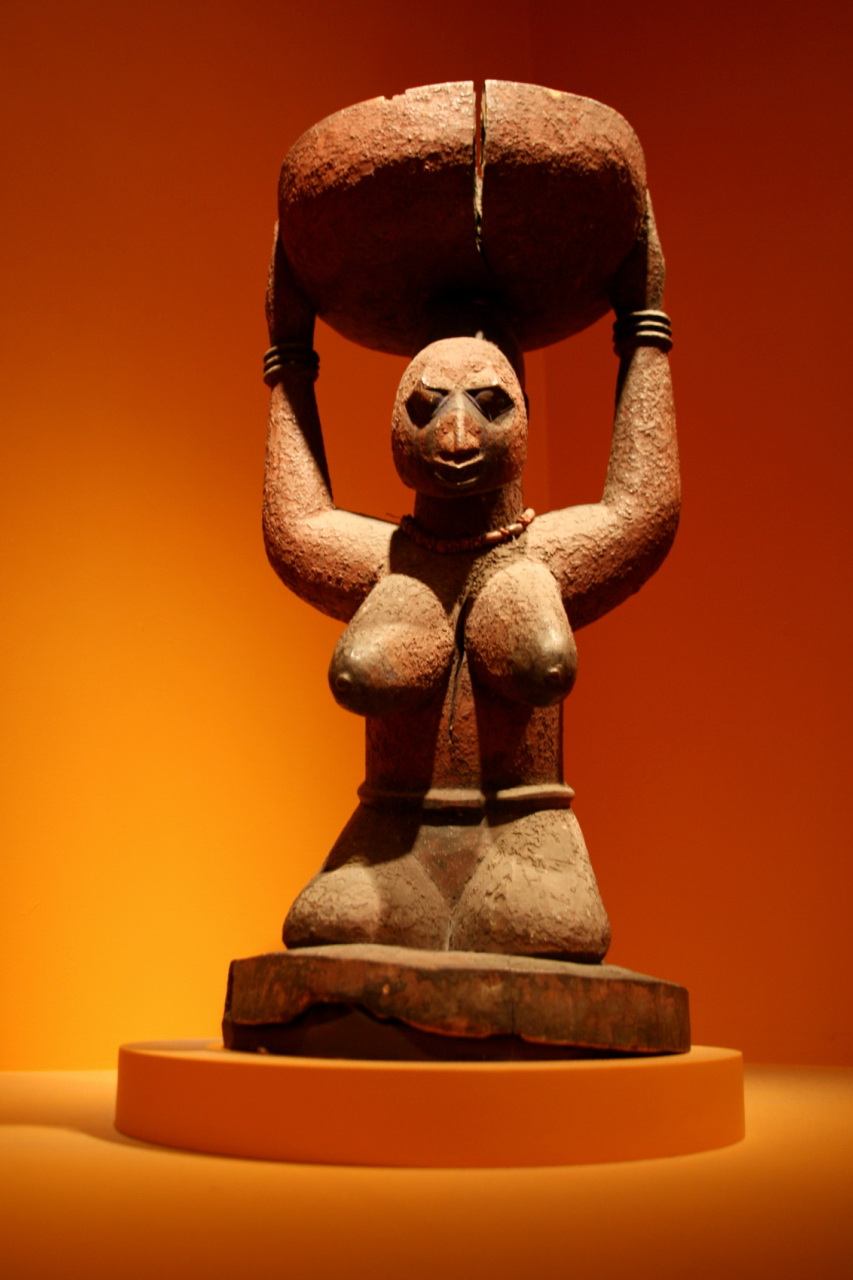
Female figure from Oke Onigbin, Shango Shrine

The community had a shrine dedicated to the god Shango, the god of thunder. However, this was abolished in 1969 and the town then had only two recognized religions: Christianity and Islam. The practice of other religions in the town was not permitted until later.

== Past rulers ==
The town has a traditional ruler known as Bara, previously known as Onigbin. The office of traditional rulers in Oke-Onigbin is rotated among the ruling families who are descendants of Baba Akoo. When a ruler dies, another ruler is chosen from the ruling family that is next in line, according to the historical records of the town.

Since the demise of the founder, Baba Akoo, the traditional kingship of the town has, from inception, rotated among the following ruling houses: 1. Ile Nla Compound 2. Odo Oja Compound 3. Ile Elmonsho (Olaoye Family Amowoelu) 4. Baba Odumo

(the Ilorin Emirate.[2]

== Contemporary religions ==
The Kwara State has numerous Muslims, and Oke Onigbin has one of the largest central mosques in the state. It also has congregations of several Christian denominations, including the Evangelical Church of West Africa (ECWA) and All Saints, an Anglican church.
