= Igbomina =

Subgroup of the Yoruba people

The Ìgbómìnà (also colloquially Igboona or Ogboona) are an ethnic subgroup of the Yoruba people, which originates from the north central and southwest Nigeria. They speak a dialect called Ìgbómìnà or Igbonna, classified among the Central Yoruba of the three major Yoruba dialectical areas. The Ìgbómìnà spread across what is now southern Kwara State and northern Osun State, in an area collectively referred to as Igbominaland. Peripheral areas of the dialectical region have some similarities to the adjoining Ekiti, Ijesha, Yagba, and Oyo dialects.

== Traditional trades and occupations ==
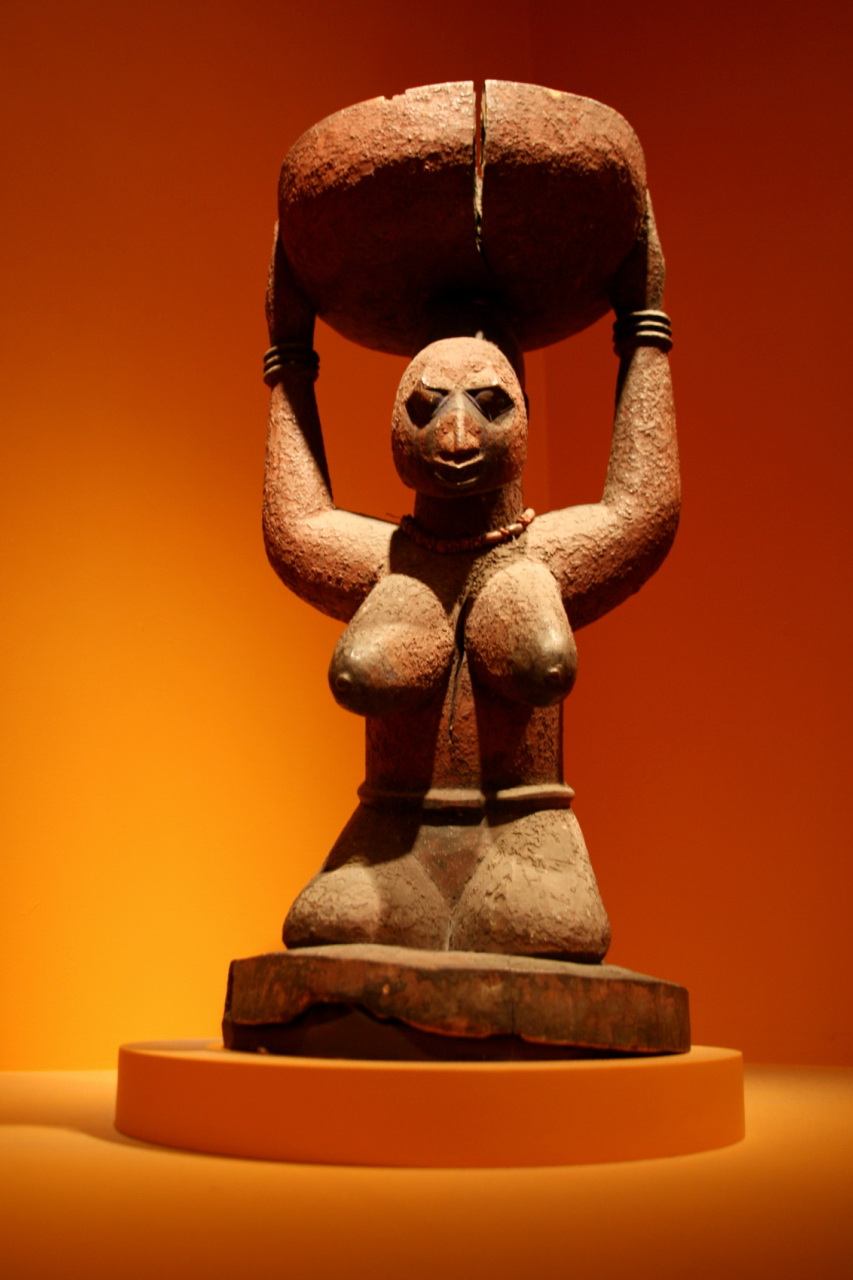
Female figure from Oke-Onigbin, Shango shrine

The Ìgbómìnà are renowned merchants well known for long distance trading which account for their wide spread across Yoruba land, they engage in other traditional occupation such as agriculture and hunting, as well as their woodcarving, leather art, and the famous Elewe masquerade. It is an Egungun representing the ancestors during special festivals.

== Geographical spread ==
Traditional Ìgbómìnàland consists of four local government areas (LGAs) of Kwara State: Irepodun, Ifelodun, Ilorin East and Isin LGAs, as well as two local government areas of Osun State: Ifedayo and Ila LGAs. The major Ìgbómìnà cities in Osun State are Oke-Ila, Ora, and Ila Orangun, while the major Ìgbómìnà cities in Kwara State which has most of the Ìgbómìnà land and population include: Omu-Aran, Ajasse Ipo, Igbonla, Oro, Edidi, Oke-Onigbin, Isanlu Isin, Ijara-Isin, Esiẹ, Omupo, Omido, Ipetu-Igbomina, Igbaja, Ora, Oke-Ode, Owu-Isin, Shaare, Oke-Aba. Villages in Igbomina Ile-Ire includes: Owa Onire, Owa Kajola, Owode Ofaro, Idoba Araromi, Ikosin (Ile Ire District Headquarters, where the popular ancient Igbo Ejimogun market was located), Oke-Oyan, Idera, Afin, Alaabe, Obinn or Obinrin Aiyetoro, Oreke Oke, Okeigbo, and Babanla. Other Igbomina towns include Idofian, Igbo-Owu, Omupo, Okanle, Fajeromi, Odo-eku, Olla, Idofin, Iwo, Agbonda, Agbeku, Olayinka, Alakuko-Irorun, Edidi, Ijan-Otun, Agbele, Omido, Okeya, Babanlomo, Agbamu, Ijan, Pamo-Isin, Egii-Owu, Owa-Onire, Durosoto, Koko-Afin, Maloko, Olomi Oja, Omirinrin, Faje, Ajengbe, Alasoro, Idofin Ayekale, Eyin Afo, Idofin Igbana, Idofin Aga, Ekudu, Manasara, Oko Adigun, Kudu-Isin, Oke oyi, Alegongo, Sabaja, Oponda, Oree, Agunjin, Apado, Eleyin, and Yaru.

Ìgbómìnàland is adjoined on the west and northwest by major neighbours such as the Oyo-Yoruba region, on the south and southwest by the Ijesha-Yoruba region, on the south and southeast by the Ekiti-Yoruba region, on the east by the Yagba-Yoruba region, and on the north by the non-Yoruba Nupe region south of the Niger River. Other minor neighbours of the Ìgbómìnà are the Ibolo sub-group of the cities of Offa, Oyun and Okuku in the west.

== Archaeological chronology and Early history ==
Over 800 carved stones, mostly representing human figures, have been found around Esie in western Igbomina, Iji-Isin, Ijara and Ofaro villages. It is not known who crafted the sculptures, but they appear to have been made around 1100 AD.

Archaeological and linguistic evidence suggest that the Ìgbómìnà people may have predated the surrounding peoples except perhaps the Nupe and the YagbaEkiti. Ìgbómìnàland definitely predated the Oduduwa era as evidenced by oral traditions of royal and non-royal migrations from Oduduwa’s Ile-Ife which met existing dynasties in place but displaced, subsumed or subjugated them. It appears that aside from more recent conflicts in the last two centuries, the Oyo, Ijesha, and the Ekiti may have in more ancient times, pressured the Ìgbómìnà, captured territory in the plains and restricted them into the more rugged and lower-quality land of the Yoruba hills. The Ìgbómìnà, on the other hand, appear to have pressured the Nupe and the YagbaEkiti and taken territory away from them in places, but also losing territory to them in other places.

The people of Igbomina prioritized defense over offense due to its lower resource requirements and reduced risks. To protect against military threats, they constructed various fortifications such as earthen ramparts, and stone and/or mud walls.

One notable fortified settlement was Gbagede, which had a mud wall enclosure and existed from 1795 to pre-19th century. Iyara and Ila-Yara also had massive rampart walls with deep ditches, built in the late 16th or early 17th century. These fortifications aimed to slow down attackers and provide protection to defenders.

In northeastern Igbomina, rock piles and boulders were also used for defense, especially near hilltop sites. They slowed down attackers and provided advantageous positions for hurling rocks. Stone embankments and mud walls were combined in some areas for added protection.

Stone piles and boulders arranged to a impressive heights, and could stretch for a distance of up to 1 km(0.6 miles). In many places only stones of various sizes were used as embankments. construction of these began from the 18th century.

Embankments were not the only use of stone architecture however. A circular stone foundation of a collapsed building was found which was later identified by to be a guards house or sentry where armed guards kept watch for enemy soldiers.

Starting in the 1840s, The Fulani Ilorin armies invaded much of Igbomina territory dominating different parts of the region. Several Igbomina rulers were made subordinate to Ilorin and forced to join the war. An example is when the ruler of Ila Orangun was taken captive to Ilorin. The Fulani conquerors established provincial administration in Igbomina, making Igbominaland a part of the greater Sokoto Caliphate.

However, by 1875 Ibadan had reconquered much land Ilorin had conquered in this northern part of Yorubaland. But, the oppressive regime of Ibadan, soon led to a revolt among the subjugated towns. The Igbomina consequently allied into a confederacy, called the Ekitiparapo, to fight for their independence.

== Recent history ==
Oral history of Ila-Orogun in Ila-Orogun dialect by Professor Rasheed Adeyinka a native speaker

The Ilorin Provincial Gazetteer (1918) dates the settlement of Igbaja, one of the Igbomina towns, as late 17th or early 18th century, while the Igbaja District Gazetteer (1933–35) puts it about 1750 AD. By 1800, the Alaafin (supreme ruler of Oyo) had consolidated his power over the Igbomina and placed an Ajele (Governor) in Ilorin to safeguard his interests. The Sudan Interior Mission came to Oro Ago in 1911, to Agunjin before 1918, and to Oke Oyan, Igbaja, and Oke Aba in the 1920s. Starting in the 1930s, primary and secondary schools were established, resulting in changes to the traditional ways of life.
