= Kaestrings =

Nigerian gospel musician and songwriter

Mr Kaestrings
- Owoicho Oche
- Born: Nigeria
- Other name: Kingsley Innocent
- Website: www.kaestrings.com

Kaestrings (born Kingsley Innocent Owoicho Oche, 24 November 1995) is a Nigerian gospel musician and songwriter known for his spiritually themed worship music. He gained widespread recognition in Nigeria following the release of his breakout worship song "Ga shi nan".

== Early life and background ==
Kaestrings was born in Nigeria and is originally from Benue State, where he belongs to the Idoma ethnic group. He was raised in Zaria, Kaduna State. From an early age, he demonstrated a strong interest in music, particularly within the church environment, where he served in choirs and developed his musical abilities.

== Career ==
Kaestrings began his music ministry in church settings, where he led worship and received invitations to minister at various Christian gatherings. His music is characterized by a focus on reverence, spiritual devotion, and deep worship experiences.

He rose to prominence after the release of "Ga shi nan" (a Hausa phrase meaning “He is here”), which gained widespread attention after being featured during Nathaniel Bassey's Hallelujah Challenge. Kaestrings is also associated with Eternity Network International (Koinonia Global), under the mentorship of Apostle Joshua Selman.

== Discography ==
- "Ga shi nan"

== See also ==
- Gospel music
- Christian worship
