= Joshua Selman =

Nigerian televangelist (born 1980)

Apostle Joshua Selman
- Born: Joshua Nimmak Selman; 25 June 1980 (age 46); Langtang North, Plateau State, Nigeria
- Education: Ahmadu Bello University
- Occupations: Gospel Preacher; Teacher; Revivalist; Televangelist
- Known for: Founder of the Eternity Network International (ENI); Koinonia

Joshua Selman Nimmak (born 25 June 1980, in Langtang North) is a Nigerian gospel preacher, revivalist and author from Plateau State, Nigeria. He is the founder and senior pastor of Eternity Network International (ENI), also known as Koinonia Global, a Christian ministry headquartered in Nigeria.

Selman is recognized for his teachings on topics such as prayer, Christian purpose, the Holy Spirit, and spiritual intimacy. His messages have garnered a substantial following, particularly among young Christians in Nigeria and other parts of Africa.

== Early life and education ==
Joshua Selman Nimmak was born on 25 June 1980 in Jos, Plateau State, Nigeria, into a Christian family . He is the second of four children born to Mr. and Mrs. Nimmak, with one brother and two sisters.

Selman developed a strong interest in spiritual matters from an early age, often participating in Bible study and fellowship activities during his school years. His early upbringing in a Christian household played a formative role in shaping his passion for ministry.

He pursued higher education at Ahmadu Bello University (ABU) in Zaria, where he earned a Bachelor’s degree in Chemical Engineering. While at the university, he was actively involved in campus ministry and began mentoring students in spiritual growth and leadership.

On 20 June 2025, Selman was awarded an Honorary Doctor of Ministry (DMin) in Leadership and Divinity by Faith Leads University, in recognition of his contributions to Christian ministry and leadership development.

== Publications and worship contributions ==
Selman's worship songs include:

- Sujanah
- We Hail You Most High
- Ebenezer
- He Leads Me and Guides Me
- I’m Under the Shadow
- Blessed Is He Who Comes in the Name of the Lord
- Here I Am
- Stirring the Water
- Have Your Way
- You Who Reign and Rule Over All
- Let the Fire Fall from Your Altar to Touch My Body
- Your Goodness Is Real
- "Hossanah Eh"
- "Ya Kare"
- "Amen"

== Marriage ==
Selman has chosen not to marry, a decision he has not regretted. . In a 2022 video, he said marriage would "deprive him of the time and energy to serve God." He also said that he wanted to "make good use of [his] energy now that [he] has it."
