= 2020 United States Shadow Representative election in the District of Columbia =

- November 3, 2020
- Turnout: 66.9 ▲20.6pp
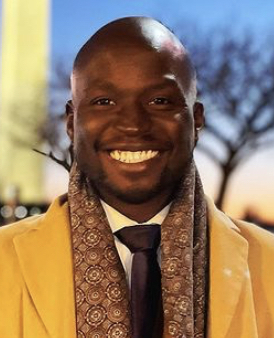

Nominee	Oye Owolewa	Joyce Robinson-Paul	Sohaer Rizvi Syed
Party	Democratic	DC Statehood Green	Independent
Popular vote	240,533	27,128	22,771
Percentage	81.6%	9.2%	7.7%
- Owolewa: 60–70% 70–80% 80–90%
Representative before election
Franklin Garcia
Democratic
Elected Representative
Oye Owolewa
Democratic

On November 3, 2020, the District of Columbia held a U.S. House of Representatives election for its shadow representative. Unlike its non-voting delegate, the shadow representative is only recognized by the district and is not officially sworn or seated.

ANC Commissioner Oye Owolewa won the election to replace retiring three-term incumbent shadow representative Franklin Garcia.

== Primary elections ==
=== Democratic primary ===
==== Candidates ====
===== Declared =====
- Oye Owolewa, ANC commissioner for 8E and pharmacist

===== Declined =====
- Franklin Garcia, incumbent shadow representative and president of the DC Latino Leadership Council

==== Results ====
Owolewa received over 90% of the vote in every ward.

District of Columbia Shadow Representative Democratic primary election, 2020
Party	Candidate	Votes	%
Democratic	Oye Owolewa	74,101	95.8%
Democratic	Write-ins	3,260	4.2%
Total votes		77,361	100.0%

=== Republican primary ===
District of Columbia Shadow Representative Republican primary election, 2020
Party	Candidate	Votes	%
Republican	Write-ins	479	100.0%
Total votes		479	100.0%

=== Statehood Green primary ===
Statehood Green primary results by ward: Robinson-Paul—80–90% Robinson-Paul—>90%

District of Columbia Shadow Representative Statehood Green primary election, 2020
Party	Candidate	Votes	%
DC Statehood Green	Joyce Robinson-Paul	405	89.0%
DC Statehood Green	Write-ins	50	11.0%
Total votes		455	100.0%

=== Libertarian primary ===
District of Columbia Shadow Representative Libertarian primary election, 2020
Party	Candidate	Votes	%
Libertarian	Write-ins	49	100.0%
Total votes		49	100.0%

== General election ==
The general election took place on November 3, 2020.

=== Candidates ===
- Oye Owolewa (Democratic)
- Sohaer Rizvi Syed (Independent)
- Joyce Robinson-Paul (D.C. Statehood Green)

=== Results ===
General election results
Party	Candidate	Votes	%
Democratic	Oye Owolewa	240,533	81.60%
DC Statehood Green	Joyce Robinson-Paul	27,128	9.20%
Independent	Sohaer Rizvi Syed	22,771	7.72%
Write-in		4,341	1.47%
Total votes		294,773	100.0%

==== Results by ward ====
Ward	Oye Owolewa Democratic		Various candidates Other parties	
Ward	#	%	#	%
Ward 1	29,932	82.04%	6,554	17.96%
Ward 2	21,455	79.42%	5,558	20.58%
Ward 3	26,766	77.01%	7,991	22.99%
Ward 4	32,848	83.37%	6,553	16.43%
Ward 5	34,022	82.84%	7,041	17.16%
Ward 6	40,813	79.48%	10,540	20.53%
Ward 7	29,447	84.81%	5,274	15.19%
Ward 8	25,270	84.24%	4,729	15.76%
Total	240,533	81.6%	54,240	18.4%
