= Igbonla =

Town in Kwara State, Nigeria

Igbonla is a town located in Irepodun LGA of Kwara State, Nigeria, located about 5.6 km away from Ajasse-Ipo. The town is in the heart of rainforest in the southern part of Kwara State. The town is headed by Oba Olabode Jimoh, Eleju of Igbonla. The people of Igbonla town are known for their resilience, hard-work and scholarship. Igbonla is home to notable personalities such as oil and gas mogul, Alh. Yahaya Anifowose, Alhaji Abdulkareem Eniafe, Alhaji Salami Lawal Giwa, Alhaji Ganiyu Oriowo and a host of others.

The Igbonla community has a large population in the farming profession because of its arable expense of land.

The community also has a mining sites where natural resources like Tantalite are extracted. Igbonla is one of the reputable town at igbomina in Kwara State.
