= Egungun =

Yoruba masquerade custom figure

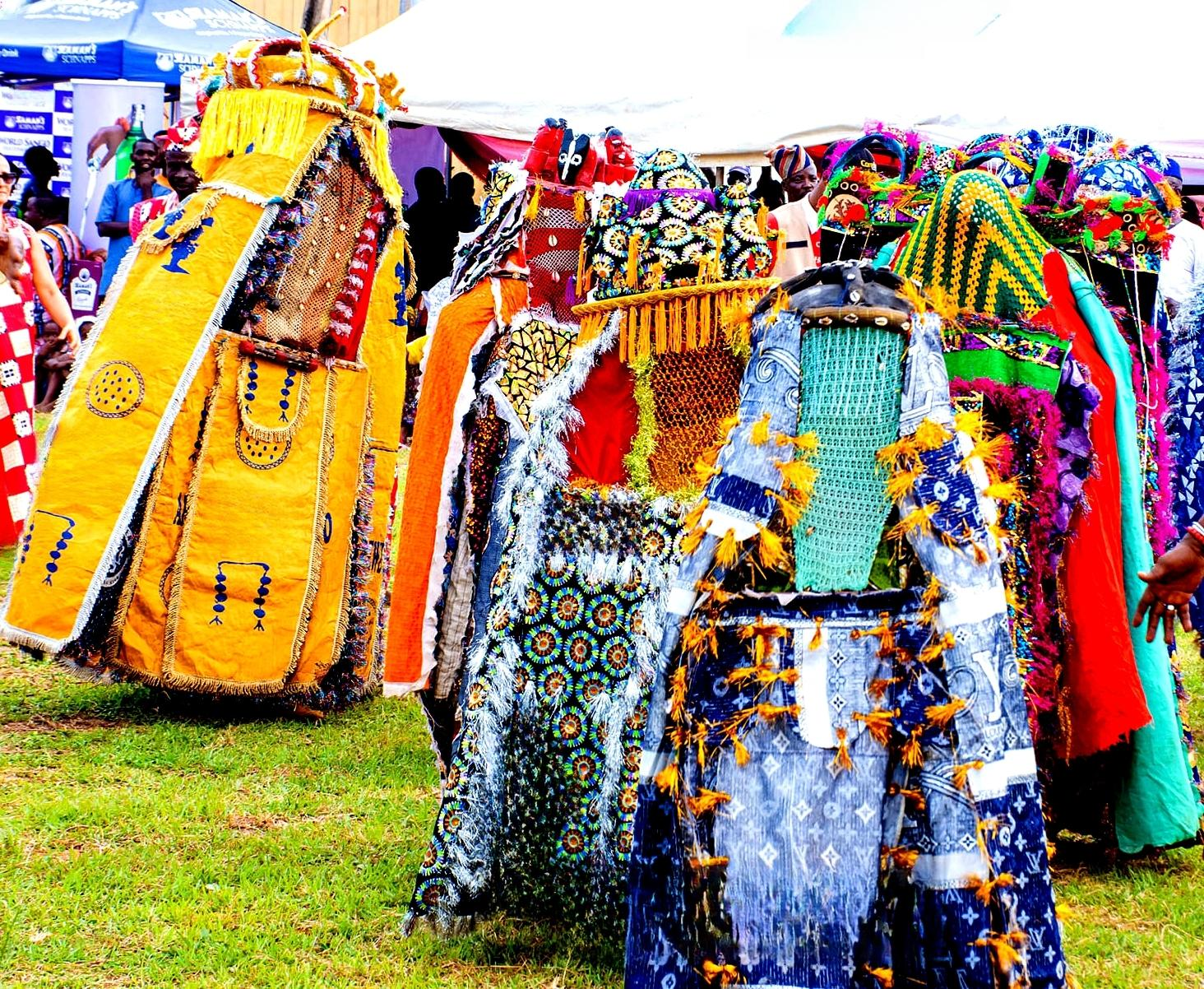
Egungun, masked costumed figures of the Yoruba people in Oyo

Egungun (Yoruba language: Egúngún, also known as Ará Ọ̀run; "the collective dead") in the broadest sense is any Yoruba masquerade or masked, costumed figure. More specifically, it is a Yoruba masquerade for ancestor reverence, or the ancestors themselves as a collective force. Eégún is the reduced form (abbreviation through syllable elision) of the word egúngún and has the same meaning. (Note: There is a misconception that Eegun/Egun (Yoruba language: Eégún) is the singular form, or that it represents the ancestors while Egúngún is the masquerade or the plural form. This misconception is common in the Americas by Orisa devotees that do not speak Yorùbá language as a vernacular.) Egungun is a visible manifestation of the spirits of departed ancestors who periodically revisit the human community for remembrance, celebration, and blessings.

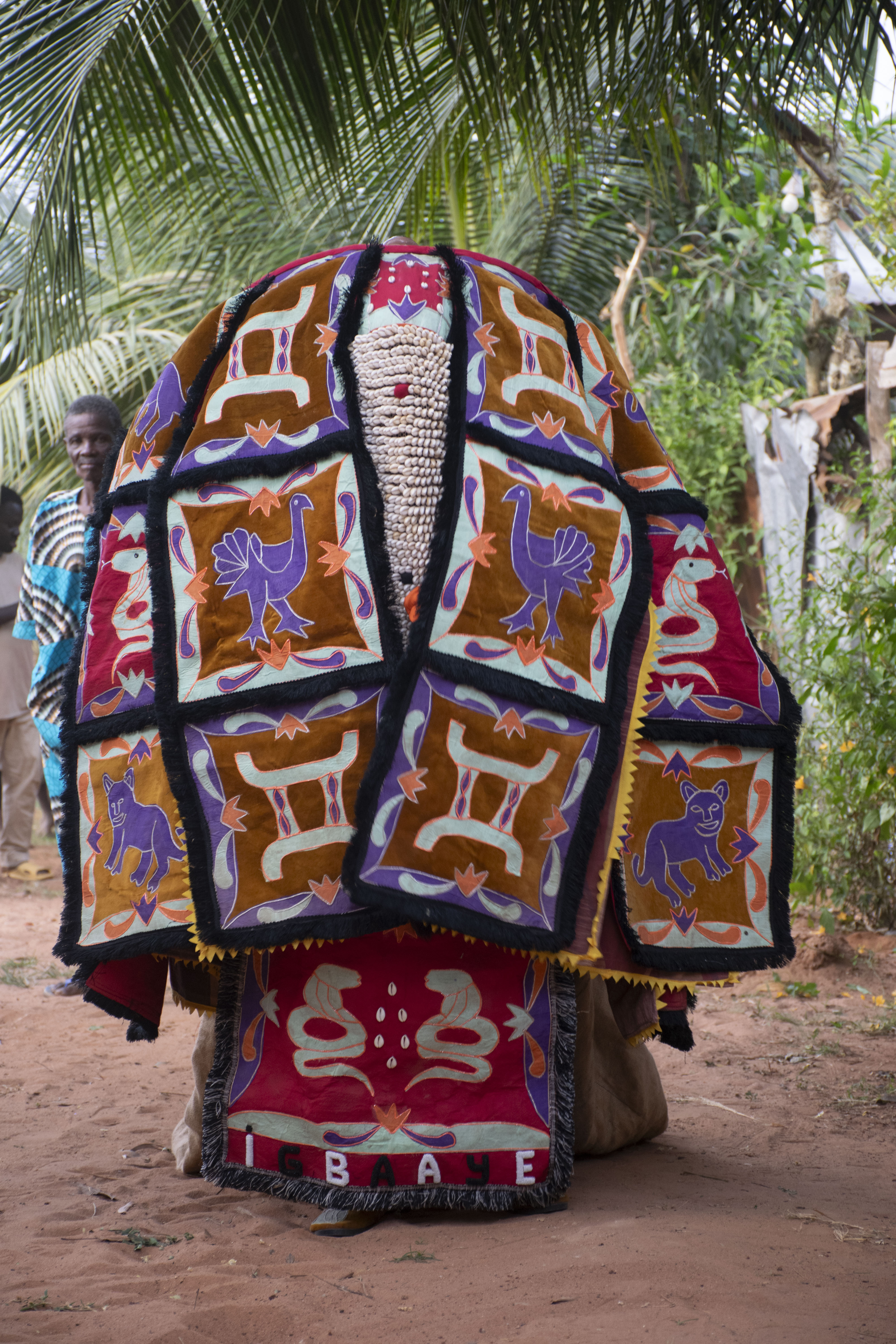
Egungun in the city of Ouidah

== Classification of Egungun types ==
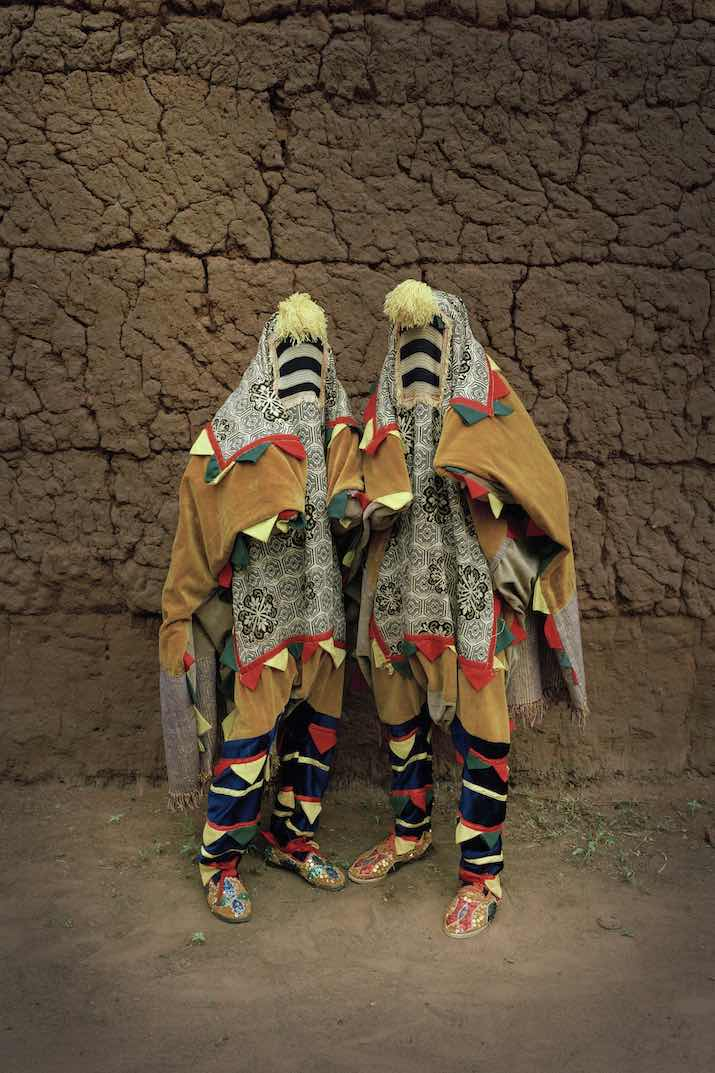
'Egunguns' are said to represent the dead in the society

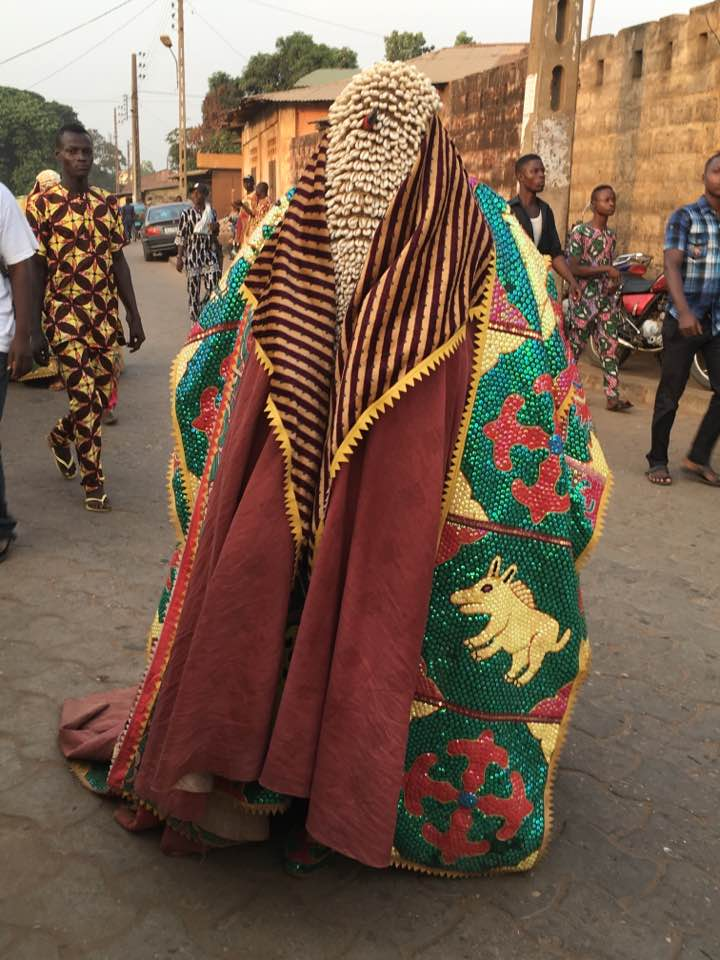
Costumed voudou figure

The classification of Egun or Egungun types, might appear to be a fairly straightforward task, but in fact it is extremely complex deciphering the comprehension of indigenous taxonomies.

The difficulties include: the problem of distinguishing between personal Egun names and generic terms for types; the problem of determining "sets" where one masquerade may be regarded as several type of categories simultaneously; the practice of "layering," in which a masquerade wears one costume type over another and changes these during performance; and the variety of criteria used to classify Egungun as well as the range of variations within type of categories. Such factors demonstrate the complexity of the analysis of indigenous taxonomies and the classification of masquerade types. These same difficulties arise in the definition and use of the term Egungun itself. However, based on cultural affinities in the southwestern Nigerian portion of Yorubaland, the following egungun names can be identified: Danafojura and Awodagbese in Ogbomoso, Alapansanpa in Ibadan, and Feleru in Ilobu, Osun State.

== Role of the family ==
In the Yoruba religion, the annual ceremonies in honor of the dead serve as a means of assuring their ancestors a place among the living. They believe the ancestors have the responsibility to compel the living to uphold the ethical standards of the past generations of their clan, town or family. The Egungun are celebrated in festivals, known as Odun Egungun, and in family ritual through the masquerade custom.

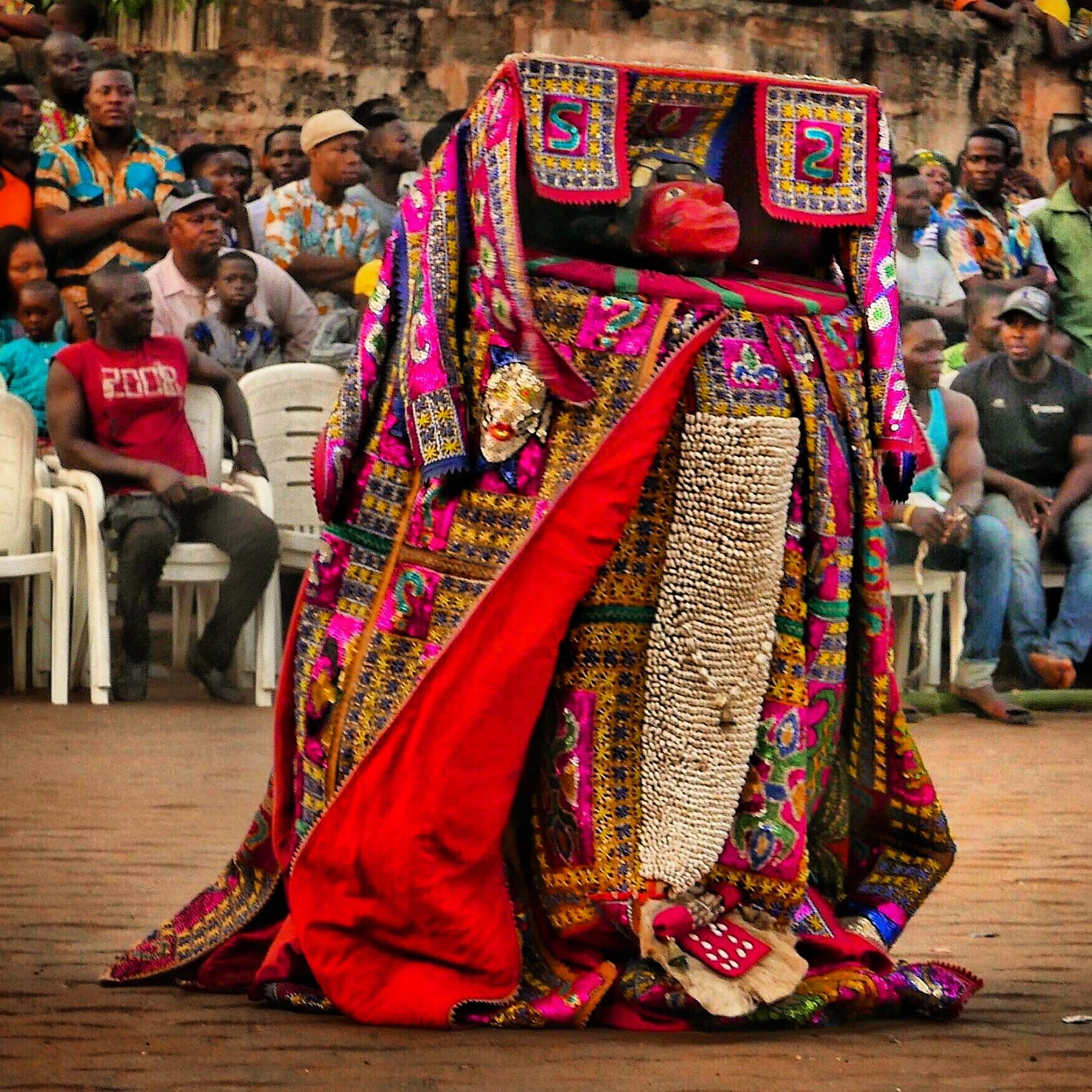

In family situations, a family elder known either formally or informally as "Alagba" presides over ancestral rites. He may or may not be initiated into the local Egungun society. In matters that deal with whole communities, Egungun priests and initiates who are trained in ancestral communication, ancestral elevation and funerary rites are assigned to invoke and bring out the ancestors. They wear elaborate costumes as masquerades. Through drumming and dance, the Egungun robed performers are believed to become possessed by the spirits of the ancestors, as manifested as a single entity. The Egungun spiritually cleans the community; through the dramatic acting and miming of the robed priests, they demonstrate both ethical and amoral behavior that have occurred since their last visit. In this way, they expose the strengths and weaknesses of the community to encourage behavior more befitting of their descendants. When this performance is completed, the performers as Egungun give messages, warnings and blessings to the assembled spectators.

Important Egungun include the Oloolu and Alapansanpa, both of Ibadanland. Elewe of the Ìgbómìnà Yoruba clan, which is common in the towns of Òkè-Ìlá Òràngún, Ìlá Òràngún, and Arandun, is also of particular prominence.

In Brazil, the main cult of the Egungun is found on the island of Itaparica, in the State of Bahia. Houses of worship dedicated to the Egungun also exist in other states.

== Egungun ensembles ==
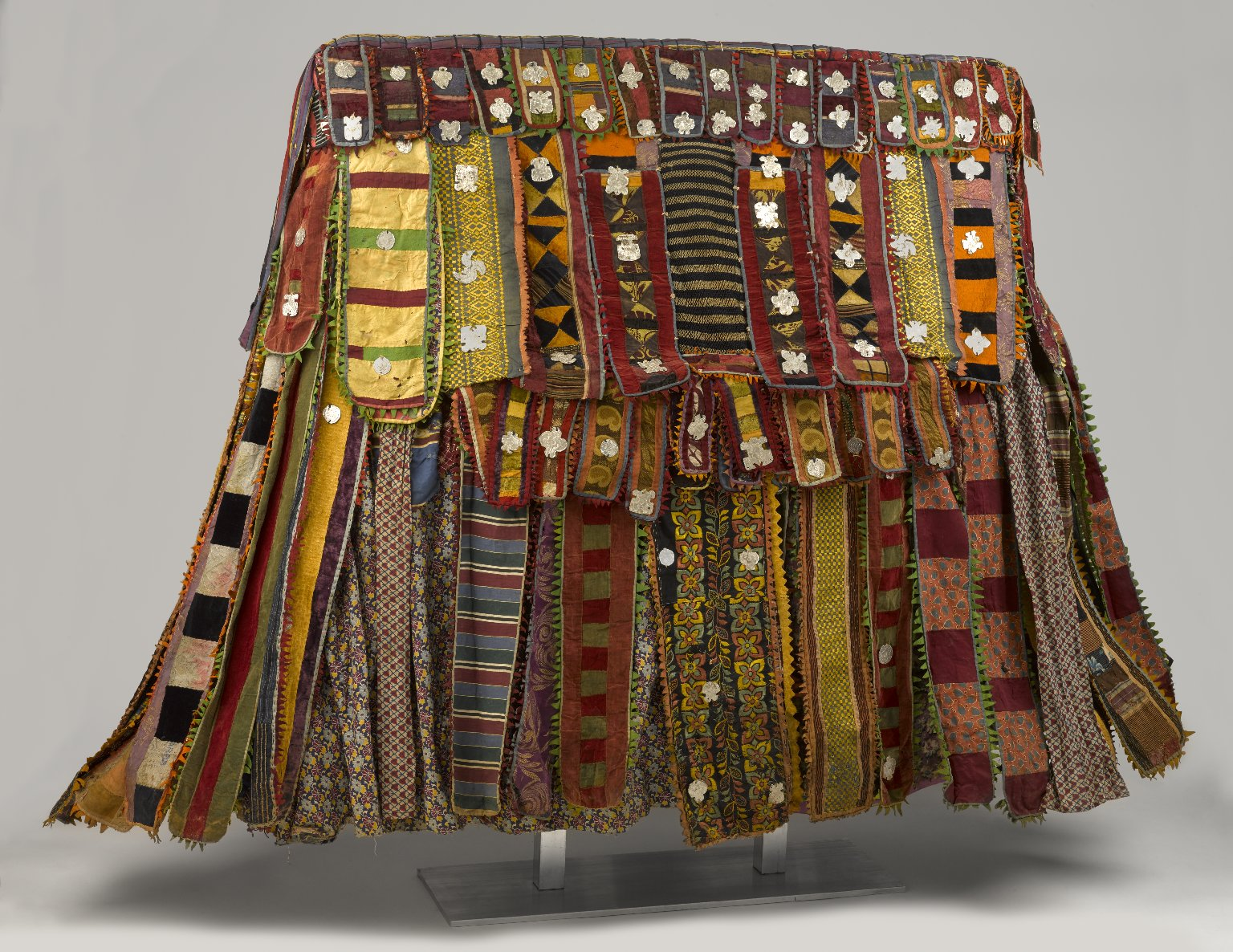
Egungun Costume (mid-20th century) Brooklyn Museum

Cloth plays an important role in the world of the Yoruba. Their beliefs equate nakedness with infancy, insanity, or the lack of social responsibility. More elaborate dress reflects social power and prestige. In performances honoring ancestors, exquisite cloth is the major medium for the masker's transformation. An Egungun costume is composed of multiple layers of cloth lappets made from expensive and prestigious textiles, expressing the wealth and status of a family as well as the power of the ancestor.

The composition of an Egungun ensemble has several distinctive features. The layer worn closest to the masker's skin, the under sack, must be made of Aso-Oke, the indigo and white strip-cloth (Fig. 6). It closely resembles the shroud in which the dead are wrapped. This sack, along with the netting for the face and hands, must completely seal the masker's body. The netting effectively disguises facial and hand features that might disclose his identity.

On top of this base are placed the layers of lappets. As the masker whirls, the lappets are sent flying, creating a "breeze of blessing." The design of the costume is therefore closely related to the choreography of the performance. Henry Drewal hypothesizes that the breeze of blessing created by the Egungun may also relate to Oya, the wife of Shango, the deified fourth king of Oyo and the god of thunder. Oya is the whirlwind, considered a wind of blessing, that precedes Shango, the storm.

To make the costume beautiful, and thus powerful, the lappets are decorated with patchwork patterns, braids, sequins, tassels, and amulets. The amulets hold medicinal preparations which have performative power (aṣẹ), providing protection against enemies at a time when the transformed person is vulnerable. The main protective amulets, however, are on the inside of the costume, not the outside. Metallic objects are also sewn onto the garment. These catch the light as the wearer moves, creating flashes that suggest connection to the spirit world, Ọrun.

The multiple hidden and visible layers of fabric used to create an Egungun costume signify the sacred and the worldly, respectively. The layers, used in combination, suggest the reunion of the departed and the living.

An ensemble is repaired and refurbished for use year after year, with layers of new lappets and amulets added to express remembrance and honour. Through divination, however, an ancestor might request a new costume altogether. The owner and the patron, the priest of divination, the tailor, the herbalist who prepares the packets of medicines, and the entire lineage collaborate in creating the ensemble. Depending upon its wealth, a family may own several types of Egungun costumes, which may represent specific or collective ancestors of the lineage.

The Egungun ensemble acts as the medium for the masker's transformation into his ancestors. An Egungun society is composed of men and women whose lineages have the right to present the masquerade. Men do the masking. Women never wear the costume, although they participate in the chorus that sings the oriki praise poems and histories of the families. Elder women of high title also perform invocations, prayers, and offerings. At annual festivals, each of the numerous lineages are given a separate day to perform. The masker is kept at a distance from the surrounding crowd with the help of attendants dressed in masquerade costumes of different types. After all the Egungun have danced, the ensembles are stored until the next performance.

== Festival ==
Egungun Festival is a festival that is celebrated amongst the Yoruba people, which is celebrated annually and has been passed successively down to generations. "The ensuing festival goes on for several days and strengthens the bonds that unite families and communities with departed ancestors." It is believed to help develop trade and commerce and generally bond the people of Yorubaland together regardless of their religious beliefs. Members of the society dance to marketplaces, wearing their masks to represent the deceased spirits of their ancestors, the spirit to be worshipped is solely decided by Ifá.

== Women's role in Egungun ==
Egungun masquerades are male-dominated within the performance aspect and only men are allowed to connect with the spirits in Egungun by transforming into the masked figure. Women are prevalent in creating the materials, dramatizing the performance, singing, dancing and watching. Elders say that separation is necessary because of the dangers of women's power.

According to the Ifa corpus, women were once in control of Egungun. The ritual originates from women's religious experience in Yoruba. It is also argued that women were the sustainers of Egungun and according to the Odu Irantegbe chapter of the Ifa corpus, they were tricked by men and their powers over the Egungun cult were taken away.

== See also ==
- Ọrun
- Zangbeto
