= Omu-Aran =

- Town
- Omu-Aran
- Coordinates: 8°08′00″N 5°06′00″E
- Country: Nigeria
- State: Kwara
- LGA(s): Irepodun
- Time zone: UTC+1 (WAT)
- Website: http://www.omuaran.org/

Omu-Aran, the Head Post of Ìgbómìnàland, is a town in Kwara State, Nigeria. It originated from Ife. At present, Omu-Aran is the headquarters or capital city of Kwara-South Senatorial District and the local government headquarters of Irepodun Local Government Area. Omu-Aran is 86.3 km (53.6 mi) from Ilorin, Kwara State Capital, along Ilorin-Kabba Federal Highway.

== History ==
Omu-Aran, which was once the headquarters of the Igbomina/Ekiti Division in what was then the West Central State and is now known as Kwara, has a rich history that spans over 500 years. Today, it serves as the Local Government Headquarters of Irepodun. The community was founded due to the migration of people from Ilé-Ifẹ̀. There was a drought in Ile-Ife. To know the cause of the drought, the oracle was consulted. The oracle said Ife was over-crowded and therefore some people had to leave. Some princes were selected to migrate to other places and were given the symbol of authority. Olomu-Aperan, the founder of Omu-Aran, was one of the selected princes who boldly established himself as the first to arrive in the region now known as Igbomina land. Omutoto or Omitoto, one of the wives of Olofinaiye Oduduwa was the mother of both Olomu Aperan and Owa Ajibogun, the founder of Ijesha land. This tradition is accepted in Ilesha and Ile Ife today. Olomu Aperan became the custodian of the Ogbo because of the Royal War title Esinkin. However, Ogbo, a symbol of authority was the property of the aboriginal people of Ile Ife. The Ogbo was also the symbol of oneness among the council of Elders in Ile Ife. Through the Ogbo the council could unknot every difficult problem. Hence, the council was called the Council of Ologbomona. Olomu Aperan left Ile-Ife with the Ogbo and found various Kingdoms.

Omu-Aran is made up of people from different backgrounds who migrated to the present site of the town. Omu-Aran became the headquarters of Irepodun LGA on 24 August 1976.

== Economy ==
Due to the vegetation of the area, Omu-Aran residents were predominately farmers. They were also famous in hunting, handicraft like basket weaving and blacksmith works.

== Climate ==
Omu Aran has a tropical wet and dry or savanna climate and is located at an elevation of 536.14 meters (1758.99 feet) above sea level (Classification: Aw). The district's average annual temperature is 0.26% higher than Nigeria's averages at 29.72°C (85.5°F). Omu Aran generally has 149.31 wet days per year (40.91% of the time) and average annual precipitation of roughly 102.08 millimeters (4.02 inches).

From January 23 to April 11, the hot season, with an average daily high temperature exceeding 32 °C (89 °F), lasts for 2.6 months. In Omu-Aran, March is the hottest month of the year, with an average high of 33 °C (91 °F) and low of 22 °C (71 °F).

From June 21 to October 14, the chilly season, which has an average daily high temperature below 28 °C (82 °F), lasts for 3.8 months. With an average low of 20 °C (68 °F) and high of 27 °C (80 °F), August is the coldest month of the year in Omu-Aran.

Omu-Aran has a tropical savanna climate. It is warm every month with both a wet and dry season. The average annual temperature for Omu-Aran is 60° degrees and there is about 336 inch of rain in a year. It is dry for 120 days a year with an average humidity of 71% and an UV-index of 6.

== Festival ==
- EGÚNGÚN FESTIVAL. This includes egungun àgbà, egungun pàràká, egungun ode (láyèwú), and egungun eléwe. Egungun is usually held once every two years in Omu-Aran and environs in remembrance of the ancestors.
- ÒGBÓ FESTIVAL (also called "Orugbo Festival") is an openly held annual festival in Omu-Aran city to pay homage to OLOGBOMONA (Olomu Aperan) and to his goddess mother popularly called ÒMÙTÓTÓ (also known as "Ìyá Ògbó" or "Ìyá Àgbà"). This festival is popularly held in Omu-Aran (Igbomina Capital City) on behalf of the entire Igbomina-Yoruba land.
- EPA and ANGERE FESTIVAL is also held in Omu-Aran within an interval of two years except at special occasions when angere comes out to entertain.
- ALÁTÀ FESTIVAL is one of the traditional festivals that hold in Omu-Aran within a period of one to two years. Alata is a kind of masquerade made with palm fronds and ashes. Alata runs with a cane called "ÀTÒRÌN" in Yoruba. It pursues after some selected runners that dare it. Beating with canes is part of the festival (in which individuals present at the venue will engage each other in beating with the slash of a cane).
- CHRISTMAS FESTIVAL is also one of the carnival-like annual festivals and is blissfully held in Omu-Aran. This is usually in the month of December. While Christians in Omu-Aran do host Christmas Festivals, Muslims in Omu-Aran similarly celebrate Ileya at Salah periods annually.
- ILÉYÁ FESTIVAL (Eid al-Adha) is lovely to behold in Omu-Aran. It happens annually during the Salah period which corresponds to the Islamic calendar.
- OMU-ARAN DAY is a kind of festival in Omu-Aran usually held within an interval of about four years. The event is used to raise funds for the physical development of the community. From funds raised from such a community fundraising in the past, the community has built some secondary schools (4 to 5 in number) which after completion were all freely handed over by the community to the government to aid good education in the state the community belongs to. Apart from secondary schools built by the community from such a fund, there are some roads in the community such as "RING ROAD" among others that the community commenced its development before government later came to complete. Likewise, the OMU-ARAN CITY COMPLEX was developed from hosting such an event in Omu-Aran.
- ÌKÓRÈ ÒMÙ-ÀRÁN is held annually in Omu-Aran to generate fund to meet community expenses. From such a fund, government water-works and an electricity power-base stationed in the community have been assisted financially to function.
- ÒMÙ-ÀRÁN Political and Economic Summit is a program designed to bring together all well meaning indigenes of the town from home and abroad to deliberate on a way forward of the political and economical prospect of the city. The second of its kind was organized and held on 29 December 2020 by Omu-Aran Peoples' Forum (OPF) in collaboration with Omu-Aran Development Association (ODA) and would be coming up every two years. That is, the next edition would be coming up on 29 December 2022.

== Language ==
Omu-Aran, being part of the Igbomina region, predominantly uses the Igbomina (or Igbona) dialect of the Yoruba language.

== Leadership ==
The system of leadership used is the traditional Oba (King) system. The traditional leader is known as OLOMU OF OMU-ARAN. The current Olomu of Omu-Aran, His Royal Majesty, Oba AbdulRaheem Oladele Adeoti Akolade Agboluaje ascended the throne on Saturday 22 September 2018. The previous Oba was His Royal Majesty Oba Charles Oladele Ibitoye (Adogbajale-bi-ileke II), died on 30 November 2017. Before Oba Ibitoye was Oba Suleiman Durotoye who was on the throne for close to 5 decades. Oba Durotoye was one of the longest-ruling kings in Omu-Aran.

Below is the list of all Olomus' from the foundation of the community till date:

1. Olomu Aperan: 1120-1190

2. Oseminigbokun Awo Igbomina: 1190–1235

3. Iba Areyin: 1240-1275

4. Atiko: 1275-1305

5. Obara: 1305-1320

6. Okokokioko: 1320-1366

7. Eringbagbo: 1366-1395

8. Lawosin: 1395-1430

9. Olomulodogbo: 1430-1565

10. Olomu Aga: 1565-1571

11. Agunbiade Agunkeloye: 1591–1629

12. Ogidigbo: 1630-1672

13. Onidade: 1672-1683

14. Amududuwusiloyo: 1683-1691

15. Ojonlasediekangbedegbede: 1691–1698

16. Ogiyan Dogbajalebiileke: 1698–1729

17. Olode ega: 1730-1733

18. Olomu efon: 1733-1738

19. Ajibade: 1739-1790

20. Ajayi Saiji Olodeogbagbara*: First time-1795-1800; Second time-1805-1809.

21. Ewedunmoye: 1801

22. Obe: 1801

23. Pepeloriesin: 1803

24. Akigbenijubiowawa: 1804

25. Alekunlogba Odeyemi: 1844-1850

26. Alakaka tinuopewa: 1859-1878

27. Lafofunogbo: 1879

28. Soganmoniju Oriade: 1879-1882

29. Fakayode Lasankale: 1899-1903

30. Esinkin Abegunde: 1904-1917

31. Momoloso: 1919-1937

32. Suleiman Durotoye: 1947-1993

33. Charles Oladele Ibitoye (Adogbajale-bi-ileke II): 1993–2017

34. Abdulraheem Oladele Adeoti (Olomu Efon II): 2018-till date.

== Notable people ==
- Late Brigadier General David Bamigboye (Born 7 December 1940 till 21 September 2018), First military governor of Kwara State for nine years
- David Oyedepo (Born 27 September 1954), Presiding Bishop Living Faith Church Worldwide (a.k.a. Winners Chapel)
- Colonel Theophilus Oladapo Bamigboye Former military governor of Bauchi and Osun State
- Lateef Jakande, journalist, former governor of Lagos state
- Oye Owolewa, Shadow representative to the U.S. House of Representatives from Washington, D.C.

== Schools ==
- Government Secondary School (GSS Omu-Aran).
- Omu-Aran High School.
- Ogbo Grammar School Omu-Aran.
- Aperan Comprehensive College Omu-Aran.
- Ofe-Aran Commercial College Omu-Aran.
- Federal Government Girls' College Omu-Aran.
- ECWA Girls' College Omu-Aran.
- Christian Government College Omu-Aran.
- Landmark University Secondary School Omu-Aran.
- Fortunate Secondary School Omu-Aran.
- Victory International College Omu-Aran.
- Ansarul Islam Secondary School Omu-Aran (AISS).
- Landmark University Omu-Aran.
- Moses Orimolade University Omu-Aran.

.Bamidele college of Heath Technology{BCHT}
