= Irepodun, Kwara State =

Irepodun
- LGA
- Interactive map of Irepodun
- Location within Nigeria
- Country: Nigeria
- State: Kwara State
- Headquarter: Omu-Aran

Government
  - Local Government Chairwoman and the Head of the Local Government Council: Comrade Jide Oyinloye

Area
  - Total: 737 km^{2} (285 sq mi)

Population (2006)
  - Total: 148,610
- Time zone: UTC+1 (WAT)
- Postal code: 251
- Website: http://www.kwarastate.gov.ng/irepodun/administration.php

Irepodun is a Local Government Area in Kwara State, Nigeria. Its headquarters is in the town of Omu-Aran. The local government is located on 8.5381º N, 5.1431º E.

It has an area of 737 km^{2} and a population of 148,610 at the 2006 census. It has very significant Yoruba cultural and historical significance. And is populated by the Igbomina people. The people of Irepodun are Yorubas and mostly of Igbomina origin with roots in Ife, Oyo and Ketu. Much of the Ifelodun domain was overtaken by the Afonja/Alimi era and annexed to the present Ilorin enclave. It has an area of 3,435 km and includes at least 80 villages and towns including Idofian, Okanle, Jimba Oja, Koko-Araromi, Ilota, Arugbo, Igbo-Owu, and Amodu.

Esiẹ Museum is a museum in Esiẹ, Irepodun. The museum was the first to be established in Nigeria when it opened in 1945. The museum once housed over one thousand tombstone figures or images representing human beings. It is reputed to have the largest collection of soapstone images in the world. In modern times the Esie museum has been the center of religious activities and hosts a festival in the month of April every year.

Another significant town is Oko, which means stone in the Yoruba language. It is a mountainous region with very special and significant rock formations that were thought to have been used by the Yoruba in ancient warfare. Folktales also talk about gods and men with superhuman strength and abilities who fought for the people. The people of Irepodun are known to listen to Dadakuada music, a music which involves the use of eulogy, chants and slow danceable beats.

Also close to Esie is Ijan-Otun, a small town within minutes from neighboring Esie and Oro, Ijan-Otun is home to an Anglican church and a Government Day secondary school. The People of Ijan-Otun are part of the igbomina. The postal code of the area is 251.

== Culture ==
Irepodun LGA has a rich Yoruba cultural heritage, with traditional festivals, music, and arts playing a key role in the lives of its people. The Omu-Aran Egungun Festival and Erin-Ile cultural celebrations are notable events that attract visitors from different parts of the country.

== Climate Condition ==
Irepodun has a tropical savanna climate (Köppen: Aw) characterized by distinct wet and dry seasons, consistently high temperatures year-round, and high humidity. It is located in the interior of Nigeria, either within Kwara State or Ekiti State, both of which share this general climate profile.

== Population ==
According to the 2006 census, irepodun has a population of over 230,000 people.

== Major towns and settlements ==
- Ayedun
- Erin-ile
- Odo-owa
- Ipetu

== Notable people ==
- Moji Afolayan (1969-), actress.
- David Oyedepo - (Born September 27, 1954) - Presiding Bishop Living Faith Church Worldwide (a.k.a. Winners Chapel).
- Kunle Afolayan - (Born September 30, 1974) - Nigerian Actor, Film Producer and Director
- Olasubomi Thaddeus Babaoye- (Born February 20, 1973) - Nigerian IT Entrepreneur and Businessman
