= Yemi Ajibade =

Nigerian playwright, actor and movie director (1929–2013)

Omoba Yemi Ajibade
- Born: Adeyemi Olanrewaju Goodman Ajibade; 28 July 1929; Ìlá Òràngún, Osun State, Nigeria
- Died: 24 January 2013 (aged 83); London, England
- Other names: Yemi Goodman Ajibade; Ade-Yemi Ajibade
- Occupations: Playwright, actor and director
- Notable work: Parcel Post; Waiting for Hannibal

Yemi Ajibade (28 July 1929 – 24 January 2013), usually credited as Yemi Goodman Ajibade or Ade-Yemi Ajibade, was a Nigerian playwright, actor and director who, after settling in England in the 1950s, made significant contributions to the British theatre and the canon of Black drama. As an actor he is well-known for Dirty Pretty Things (2002), The Exorcist: The Beginning (2004) and Danger Man (1964). In a career that spanned half a century, he directed and wrote several successful plays, as well as acting in a wide range of drama for television, stage, radio and film.

== Biography and education ==
Adeyemi Olanrewaju Goodman Ajibade was born into the royal house of Ọ̀ràngún from Ìlá Òràngún, Osun State, in the south-west of Nigeria. He attended Abeokuta Grammar School – where he developed an interest in theatre – and later pursued studies in London, at Kennington College of Law and Commerce (1955), at The Actors' Workshop (1960), and from 1966 to 1968 at the London School of Film Technique (now the London Film School), where he was a contemporary of filmmaker Horace Ové (who has recalled that they were the only two black students in the school at the time).

== Career and works ==
From early in his stay in the UK, Ajibade acted in radio drama for the BBC African Service. As producer Fiona Ledger recalled in 2007: "It was back in 1960 that the late BBC producer John Stockbridge was asked by the Head of the African Service to devise some kind of drama for African listeners. He came up with a series, a soap opera set in London. No copy survives, but Yemi Ajibade took the role of a social worker, moving around England and settling quarrels."

As his acting career developed, he was hailed in 1963 as "one of the most promising actors from West Africa". Alongside performers who included Yulisa Amadu Maddy, Leslie Palmer, Eddie Tagoe, Karene Wallace, Basil Wanzira, and Elvania Zirimu, among others, Ajibade featured in a production of Lindsay Barrett's Blackblast! filmed in 1973 for a special edition of the BBC Two arts and entertainment programme Full House devoted to the work of West Indian writers, artists, musicians and film-makers.

Ajibade's acting portfolio would eventually encompass roles in television series such as Armchair Theatre (starring in 1963 in The Chocolate Tree by Andrew Sinclair, together with Earl Cameron and Peter McEnery), Danger Man (1965), Dixon of Dock Green (1968), Douglas Botting's The Black Safari (1972), The Fosters (1976), Prisoners of Conscience (1981), and Silent Witness (1996), and work on the stage – for instance, in "Plays Umbrella", a season of five specially commissioned new plays, at Riverside Studios (in association with Drum Arts Centre, London) in August 1980, and Nicholas Wright's plays One Fine Day (1980 at Riverside Studios) and The Custom of the Country (1983 at The Pit, Barbican Centre), and in Lorraine Hansberry's Les Blancs (Royal Exchange Theatre, 2001) – as well as film appearances including in Terence Fisher's The Devil Rides Out (1968), Monte Hellman's Shatter (1974), Hanif Kureshi's London Kills Me (1991), Skin (1995, written by Sarah Kane), Dirty Pretty Things (2002), Exorcist: The Beginning (2004) and Flawless with Demi Moore and Michael Caine (2007).

In 1966 Ajibade led a delegation of British, West Indian and African members to the World Festival of Black Arts in Dakar, Senegal, directing a production of Obi Egbuna's play Wind Versus Polygamy; at the 2nd World Black Arts Festival in Lagos in 1977 Ajibade was supervisor of Drama Events. In 1975 he was appointed as a tutor by the Inner London Education Authority, and he also became artistic director of the Keskidee Centre in north London, where he directed a production of Wole Soyinka's The Swamp Dwellers (13–23 March 1975).

Among Ajibade's best known works as a playwright is Parcel Post, which had 29 performances by the English Stage Company at the Royal Court Theatre in 1976–77, directed by Donald Howarth, with a cast including Rudolph Walker, Christopher Asante, and Taiwo Ajai (who has said that her own acting career started by chance "when she stumbled across Yemi Ajibade on a production"). Ajibade's subsequent plays included Fingers Only (originally entitled Lagos, Yes Lagos when it was broadcast by the BBC in 1971 and published in Nine African Plays for Radio in 1973), which in its 1982 production for the Black Theatre Co-operative (now NitroBeat) was directed by Mustapha Matura at The Factory Theatre, Battersea Arts Centre, and Albany Empire. Waiting for Hannibal opened in June 1986 at the Drill Hall, followed by a national tour, with Burt Caesar and Ajibade directing a cast that included Judith Jacobs, Wilbert Johnson and others; and A Long Way From Home was produced by Nicolas Kent at the Tricycle Theatre in 1991, with Ajibade himself heading the cast.

Ajibade also worked in Ibadan during the late 1970s, as a writer and director (1976–79) with the Unibadan Masques, the University of Ibadan's School of Drama acting company.

In February 2008, at an All-Star Gala held at Theatre Royal Stratford East on the 10th anniversary of Tiata Fahodzi, Ajibade was honoured as a leader of British-African theatre, alongside Taiwo Ajai-Lycett, Dotun Adebayo, Dona Croll, Femi Oguns, Chiwetel Ejiofor, Hugh Quarshie and others.

== Personal life ==
Ajibade was married to actor and poet Ebony White. They had two daughters, Adenrele and Mimi. From a previous relationship, he had another daughter, Marigold. He had several siblings, including sisters Arinade Victoria, Layo, Janet, Bolanle and Fadeke, and a brother, Sunday. He died in the UK on 13 January 2013 at the age of 83.

== Plays ==
- Award (unproduced)
- Behind the Mountain – first produced: Unibadan Masques, 1977
- Fingers Only – first produced: The Factory, Battersea Arts Centre, London (Black Theatre Co-operative, directed by Mustapha Matura), 1982. As Lagos, Yes Lagos, BBC Radio, 1971.
- A Long Way from Home – first produced: Tricycle Theatre, London (directed by Nicolas Kent), 1991
- Mokai – first produced: Unibadan Masques, 1979
- Parcel Post – first produced: Royal Court Theatre, London, 16 March 1976
- Waiting for Hannibal – first produced: Drill Hall, London (Black Theatre Co-operative, directed by Ajibade with Burt Caesar), 1986
- Para Ginto (black version of Peer Gynt) – Tricycle Theatre, 1995

== Bibliography ==
- Fingers Only and A Man Names Mokai. Ibadan: Y-Book Drama series, 2001, 142 pp. ISBN 978-2659-88-6
- Parcel Post and Behind the Mountain. Ibadan: Y-Book Drama series, 2001, 147 pp. ISBN 978-2659-89-4
- Gwyneth Henderson and Cosmo Pieterse (eds), Nine African Plays for Radio (includes "Lagos, Yes Lagos" by Yemi Ajibade), Heinemann Educational Books, AWS, 127, 1973.

== Partial filmography ==
- 1962: The Sword in the Web (TV Series) - Jean
- 1963: Suspense (TV Series) - Joshua
- 1963: Armchair Theatre (TV Series) - Jacob Jones
- 1964: Festival (TV Series) - Aide to Lichee
- 1964: Espionage (TV Series) - Sergeant
- 1965: The Wednesday Play (TV Series) - Rebel soldier / Man in pub
- 1965: Danger Man (TV Series) - Barman
- 1966: The Witches - Mark (uncredited)
- 1967: Theatre 625 (TV Series) - Tsilla Mamadou
- 1967: Thirty-Minute Theatre (TV Series) - Observer
- 1968: 30 Is a Dangerous Age, Cynthia - New Lodger (uncredited)
- 1968: The Devil Rides Out - African (uncredited)
- 1968: Dixon of Dock Green (TV Series) - Roger Bunda
- 1969: The Power Game (TV Series) - Premier of Malta
- 1970: Carry On Up the Jungle
- 1972: The Black Safari (TV Movie)
- 1973: Full House (TV Series) - Black Blast! cast member
- 1974: Shatter - Ansabi M'Goya / Dabula M'Goya
- 1976: Shades of Greene (TV Series) - 1st Head boy
- 1976: The Fosters (TV Series) - Mr. Fuller
- 1981: Prisoners of Conscience (TV Series) - Walter Sisulu
- 1987: Truckers (TV Series) - Watchman
- 1989: Behaving Badly (TV Mini-Series) - Church Elder
- 1991: Smack and Thistle (TV Movie) - Pedro
- 1991: London Kills Me - Tramp
- 1993: Rwendo (Short)
- 1995: Skin (Short) - Neville
- 2002: Dirty Pretty Things - Mini Cab Driver (as Ade-Yemi Ajibade)
- 2004: Exorcist: The Beginning - Turkana Shaman
- 2007: Silent Witness (TV Series) - Samson Moyo
- 2007: Flawless - Guinean Negotiatior (final film role)
