= Burt Caesar =

British actor, broadcaster and director

- Born: St Kitts
- Occupations: Actor, broadcaster and director
- Organizations: Black Theatre Co-operative; Royal Court Theatre; RADA

Burt Caesar is a British actor, broadcaster and director for stage and television, who was born in St Kitts and migrated to England with his family as a child. His career has encompassed acting in Bond films (Skyfall, 2012), stage performances including in Shakespearian roles, and many plays for BBC Radio 4. Caesar regularly works as a director and is an artistic advisor at the Royal Academy of Dramatic Art (RADA). He is also a commentator on theatre and literature.

== Career ==
=== Theatre and radio ===
As a stage actor, Caesar has had roles that include in Chekhov's The Cherry Orchard (Birmingham Rep and Market Theatre, Johannesburg, with Janet Suzman), as Capulet in Romeo and Juliet (Lyric Theatre, Hammersmith), Macduff in Macbeth (St Barts, New York City International Festival of Theatre), as well as in productions of other Shakespeare plays such as Othello, The Merchant of Venice, Julius Caesar and The Tempest (Liverpool Everyman). His other theatre includes Noises Off by Michael Frayn, Crusade (Stratford East), Athol Fugard's My Children! My Africa! (Watermill Theatre), Fanny Kemble, Blood Knot, Steve Carter's Eden (Riverside Studios, 1990), James Baldwin's Blues for Mister Charlie (Crucible Theatre, Sheffield), In Self Defence, Caryl Churchill's Serious Money (Royal Court), Douglas Jerrold's Black-Eyed Susan (Oxford Playhouse, 1987), Judith, Carnival War (Royal Court), Sergeant Ola (Royal Court), Strange Fruit, and The Miser. His performance as "Old Mack" in Errol John's Moon on a Rainbow Shawl, which opened in 2012 at the Cottesloe Theatre, with a subsequent tour in 2014, received widely positive notice, being described by Theatre News Online as "compelling in his choreographed smoothness" and by The Guardian theatre critic Michael Billington as "richly remarkable". Caesar's 2015 performance in Timberlake Wertenbaker's Jefferson's Garden at the Watford Palace Theatre was also well received.

Caesar has given acclaimed readings of Derek Walcott's long poem "The Schooner Flight" both on stage and radio.

Caesar's radio work includes frequent performances in plays, including a dramatisation by Margaret Busby of C. L. R. James's novel Minty Alley, first broadcast on BBC Radio 4 in 1998, Biyi Bandele's 2002 dramatisation of Oroonoko by Aphra Behn, Patricia Cumper's dramatisation of Andrea Levy's Small Island, broadcast in 2004, and Shakespeare's Troilus and Cressida in 2005, the play's first radio production for more than 20 years.

In August 2007, Caesar's Radio 4 programme To Sir, With Love Revisited, directed by Mary Ward-Lowery, about E. R. Braithwaite's 1959 autobiographical account of teaching at a school in the East End of London, was described by The Guardian′s reviewer as "utterly charming radio". Caesar's feature Black Students in Red Russia – which among other interviews included one with Jan Carew, author of the 1964 novel Moscow Is Not My Mecca – was chosen by the New Statesman as a "Pick of the Week" when the programme was broadcast on Radio 4 (again produced by Ward-Lowery) in January 2009.

Also that year, Caesar presented Black Screen Britain, a two-part Radio 4 documentary series exploring how British film and television drama portrayed post-war African-Caribbean migrants and created opportunities for pioneering black actors. He is a regular reader of poetry and short stories on a variety of programmes, including Poetry Please. On the programme A Good Read in 2010, Caesar's choice of book was C. L. R. James's 1963 memoir Beyond a Boundary.

In 2011, Caesar presented a BBC Radio 4 programme about pioneering publisher John La Rose, founder of New Beacon Books, entitled What We Leave We Carry: The Legacy of John La Rose, which was produced by Julian May and featured contributions by Sarah White, Linton Kwesi Johnson, Margaret Busby, Susan Craig-Jones and Gus John.

In April 2017, Caesar performed at the Arcola Theatre in The Plague, based on the 1947 novel of the same name (originally La Peste) by Albert Camus, adapted and directed "with great ingenuity" by Neil Bartlett.

Later in 2017, Caesar played the role of Gloucester in King Lear in a production directed by Nancy Meckler at Shakespeare's Globe (10 August – 14 October), giving a performance that the Financial Times characterised as "dignified and moving".

In September 2019, he appeared in the Somerset Maugham drama For Services Rendered at Jermyn Street Theatre.

=== Film and television ===
Among films in which Caesar appeared are Skyfall (2012), Dominion: Prequel to the Exorcist (2005) and Exorcist: The Beginning (2004), Bad Boy Blues (1995), Britannia Hospital (1982), New Year's Day (2001), Tomorrow Never Dies (1997), The Amnesty Files (HBO), and Scoop (1987).

His television appearances include parts in Holby City (BBC), Casualty (BBC), Dalziel & Pascoe (BBC), The Bill (Thames TV), Prime Suspect (Granada TV), Prime Suspect II, Between The Lines (BBC), Albion Market (Granada), Revolver (Thames), The Professionals (ITV), Us Girls (BBC), Hard Cases (Central), We Are the Elephant, No Problem! (Channel 4), Girls on Top, Dancers, and The Cleopatras (BBC). Most recently he appeared on BBC One in Death in Paradise.

Caesar is also sought after as a narrator for documentaries, as well as for voice-over work.

=== Directing ===
Alongside acting, Caesar has over the years directed regularly for both stage and television. In 1986, he directed for the Black Theatre Co-operative (now Nitrobeat) the play Waiting for Hannibal by Yemi Ajibade, which opened at the Drill Hall, followed by a national tour, with Judith Jacobs, Wilbert Johnson and others in the cast. Among other productions, Caesar directed Sidepockets at the Theatre Royal Stratford East; Cloud Nine at the Contact Theatre, Manchester; Trish Cooke's Back Street Mammy (West Yorkshire Playhouse, 1991); Eugene O'Neill's All God's Chillun Got Wings at West Yorkshire Playhouse (1993); and Michele Celeste's My Goat at the Soho Theatre Company (1994).

Caesar was former Associate Director at the Royal Court Theatre.

Film and TV drama he has directed includes, for the NT Archive, Remembrance by Derek Walcott and Welcome Home Jacko by Mustapha Matura, as well as numerous episodes of the BBC One medical soap opera Doctors.

Caesar is an artistic advisor at the Royal Academy of Dramatic Art (RADA), where productions he has directed include Tarell Alvin McCraney's The Brothers Size and Yerma by Federico Garcia Lorca.

=== Consulting, curatorial and other work ===
His work as a tutor includes working with award-winning producer and director Tim Reid, founder of the Legacy Media Institute, on intensive filmmakers workshops both in the UK and the US, in partnership with the British Film Institute (BFI).

Caesar is also a creative consultant at the Museum of London Docklands, where he was an adviser in establishing the permanent gallery London, Sugar & Slavery. Discovering his family name in the papers of Thomas and John Mills, plantation owners in St Kitts, during the development of the exhibition, Caesar said: "For all British citizens of West Indian origin the Mills papers are vital documents in the often hidden or 'lost' history of slavery in the islands. As someone born in St. Kitts, and now living in London, these papers are even more important. On a personal level, there may be a direct family connection: a 'Caesar' is listed in the Mills papers. And on the grander scale of historical legacy, they provide further evidence of the long established link between the West Indies and England. My fellow Kittitians and I are descended from survivors of one side of a brutal and profitable trade which always had London at its centre." Caesar is the brother of filmmaker Imruh Bakari.

Caesar has also been a critic and commentator on theatre and literature.

In 2021, Caesar programmed a season of films and talks at the BFI commemorating the life and career of Earl Cameron.

On 17 May 2023, Caesar was in conversation with Linton Kwesi Johnson at Brixton Library.

In December 2023, Caesar curated a season celebrating Harry Belafonte in the "African Odysseys" programme at the BFI Southbank, with panel discussions alongside screenings of films spanning Belafonte's 70-year career.

== Filmography ==
- Britannia Hospital (1982) – Demonstrator
- Kolmanskop (1983) – Philemon Madume
- Scoop (1987, TV movie) – Ishmaelia – Dr Benito
- The Amnesty Files (1990, TV movie) – Matthew
- New Year's Day (2000) – Mr. James
- Dominion: Prequel to the Exorcist (2005) – Dr. Lamu
- Skyfall (2012) – Howard Dayton, Inquiry Member
- Death in Paradise, "A Personal Murder", Season 5, Episode 4 (28 January 2016) – Father Floyd
- King Lear: Live from Shakespeare's Globe (2017) – Gloucester
