= Oba-Igbomina =

Nigerian town

Oba-Igbomina (Note: (in Yoruba correctly Ọ̀bà, but also written as Òbà), is an ancient Igbomina town in northeastern Isin Local Government Area of Kwara State, Nigeria. It is one of the five related Yoruba towns named "Oba", the others being:

- Oba-Ile, Olorunda LGA, Osun State, located about 15 km northwest of Osogbo,
- Oba-Oke, Olorunda LGA, Osun State, located north-northwest of Osogbo,
- Oba-Ile Akure South LGA, Ondo State, located just east of Akure, on Akure-Owo Road,
- Oba-Akoko Akoko South-West LGA, Ondo State, located northeast of Owo.

The original Ọ̀bà was the capital of an ancient Ọ̀bà civilization, a kingdom reputed in the oral history of the region as a center of great wealth and enterprise. Most of the extant Oba towns claim to be the original Oba or claim to be the oldest derivative of the ancient civilization.

== History and archaeology ==
Recent archaeological research results and published works of oral history experts, anthropologists and archeologists of the Arizona State University, USA and the University of Ibadan, Nigeria, of the region's contemporary and later settlements suggest that Ọ̀bà was founded between the 9th and 10th centuries. Regular conflicts with the neighbouring Nupe resulted in cycles of abandonment and reoccupation of the Òbà mother city.

British colonial records of Oba-Igbomina, indicate that the ancient Ọ̀bà kingdom used the "iron crown and rod" as the insignia of the king, perhaps as a result of their early involvement with iron-smelting and iron-working technology. Oratures makes references to idẹ which is brass, not irin, which is iron. Therefore, the "iron" crown and rod are more likely to be made from some alloy such as brass or bronze. Subsequent Yoruba kingdoms (perhaps including Oba), used beaded "crown and rod" insignia, possibly because precious stones and glassware replaced metalware as the symbol of high rank and wealth.

== The great Oba diasporas ==
The ancient Ọ̀bà kingdom produced a series of diasporas which influenced several other Igbomina and non-Igbomina Yoruba kingdoms and towns. The earliest diaspora from the ancient Oba civilization is constituted by the five towns in Yorubaland with the name "Oba" (not to be confused with the differently pronounced Oba, a river in Yorubaland): two in Osun State, Oba-Ile near Ikirun, Oba-Oke near Ikirun adjoining Oba-Ile; one in Kwara State Oba-Igbomina - generally called Oba without the Igbomina or the historically recent Isin tag; and two in Ondo State, Oba-Ile near Akure, and Oba-Akoko. Although none of these is the original Oba, but that they are diaspora settlements of Oba people from the more ancient Oba.

Several of the clans that migrated away from the ancient Òbà kingdom retained oratures which refer to their ancestry from the ancient Ọ̀bà. One such Ọ̀bà-diaspora clan is that of the royal Oba'lumo lineage whose ancestor Oba'lumo founded a new city-state called Isedo. This is a separate diaspora of smaller segments from Oba although this was the only known kingdom established by Oba émigrés.

A third diaspora sequence occurred in the 18th century resulting from attacks from the Nupe kingdom to the north of Oba Igbomina. Examples of Igbomina and non-Igbomina towns (in Kwara and Osun states of Nigeria) with large concentrations of people from Ọ̀bà diasporas include the following: Oke-Ila Orangun (Isedo-Oke), Ila Orangun (Isedo), Ora-Igbomina, Ipoti-Ekiti, Isanlu-Isin, Oke-Onigbin, Omu-Aran, Rore, Oyan, Inisha, Ipee, Oke-Ode, Babanla, Ajasse Ipo, Omupo, Esie, Oro, Ijomu-Oro, Iddo-Oro, Ahun, Idofin, Ado-Eku, Oreke, Sanmora and Pamo.

Ago Oba (Camp of the Oba), the Oba diaspora community in the Owu section of Abeokuta in southwestern Nigeria is also a separate diaspora but further research of the oral history is necessary to clarify if this was a migration with Owu people as a result of the 19th century Yoruba Civil Wars, or whether Ago Oba migrated separately from another Oba location.

== Tourism to the Oba diasporas ==
The legends of origin and of emigrations of the Oba diasporas has been a major effort of His Royal Highness, Dr. Olúfẹ́mi Ọládàpọ̀ Babalọlá. He has also been active since 2004 in promoting tourism (heritage tourism/cultural tourism and geo-tourism), and planning tourist expeditions to the various heritage sites and physiographic features and cultural performances/traditional occupations of the Igbomina-Yoruba and adjoining Yoruba areas. He has led various special tours to the various old sites, ruins and existing towns and historical places of Yorubaland, especially of the Igbomina-Yoruba region, verifying oral history and oral poetry of various clans and ancient kingdoms.
