= Isedo =

Ancient Igbomina kingdom

Ìsèdó (also known as Ìsẹ̀dó-Olúmọ̀) was an ancient Igbomina kingdom in northeastern Yorubaland of Nigeria. Ìsẹ̀dó was founded as a new city-state several centuries ago (between 1250 and 1400) by Ọba'lumọ, a Prince of the ancient Oba civilization (whose name or appellation is contracted from "Ọba Olumọ" meaning "knowledgeable king", or "king of the lords of knowledge"). Ìsẹ̀dó is fully known and called "Ìsẹ̀dó-Olúmọ̀" using its founder-king's name as an identifier suffix.

== Foundation and development ==
Obalumo, a prince of the Oba civilization, and a veteran hunter and warrior, founded Ìsẹ̀dó, his new city-state in one of the areas of his frequent hunting expeditions.

Recent archaeological research results (and published works of oral history experts, anthropologists and archaeologists of the Arizona State University, USA and the University of Ibadan, Nigeria); of the region's contemporary and later settlements suggest that Ìsẹ̀dó was founded between the 10th and the 12th centuries by Ọ̀bà refugees probably fleeing from both internal dissension in their Òbà kingdom as well as the cyclic conflicts of their Ọ̀bà kingdom with the neighbouring kingdoms, perhaps including the Nupe to the north.

At its zenith towards the end of the 15th century, Ìsèdó had grown into a city-state of 13 clans, some of which were later "consolidants" into the Obalumo's kingdom at Ìsèdó and were not of the ancient Oba origin.

== New arrivals ==
Some oral-historians indicate that at the request of an arriving faction from Ila-Yara, the city-state founded by Òràngún, Oduduwa's fourth son, the region's king, Ọba'lúmọ̀ gave land-grants to the new arrivals at a location thought to be sufficiently distant from Ìsẹ̀dó's location. Another version of the oral history, which seems more reliable, indicates that the land-grant occurred a few centuries later, when the faction of the younger of two quarreling princes arrived in the vicinity of the Ọba'lúmọ̀'s Ìsèdó kingdom, from the schism at their old kingdom at Ìlá Yàrà. Arutu Oluokun, the younger of the feuding princes, founded a settlement at the Ila-Magbon, but the new kingdom moved within a short time to found another city called Ila-Odo closer to Isedo, which subsists as the modern Ìlá Òràngún.

== Consolidation and accommodation ==
An annual celebration called "Ìmárúgbó" (or "Òkùnrìn") festival was instituted between the two city-states during which the King Ọ̀ràngún leaves his palace with his chiefs to pay a day-long homage to his primogenitor, the King Ọba'lúmọ̀ in his (the Ọba'lúmọ̀'s) palace. This is in symbolic tribute to Ọba'lúmọ̀'s land grant and precedence of him in the region, in appreciation of Ọba'lúmọ̀'s hosting of the Òràngún's elderly mother who could not continue with the immigrant party to the location of their allocated land. The Ọ̀ràngún's mother died in the palace of the Ọba'lúmọ̀ and was buried at Ìsèdó. So the Ọ̀ràngún also visits her grave as part of this festival.

While it has maintained the royal title of Oba'lúmò, the kingdom of Ìsèdó has in modern times been virtually engulfed by the present-day Ila Orangun such that the old Isedo township now lies, in the southeast quadrant of Ila Orangun. In Oke-Ila, the oratures of the Ọbaálá clan refer to their origin from Ìsèdó, indicating that they are actually a segment of the Ìsẹ̀dó royalty which emigrated several centuries ago to an alliance with Apakiimo, the last Orangun at Ila Yara kingdom to found his (Orangun's) new kingdom now known as Oke-Ila.

In this five-centuries-old quasi-consolidation treaty to help found with the new Oke-Ila Orangun state, the Ìsẹ̀dó immigrants "of the hilltop" (Isedo Oke or Isedo Ori Oke)were retained their royal title of Ọba'lúmọ̀, and subsequently were accorded a new recognition (possibly for their foremost contribution to the establishment of the new kingdom), awarding their clan the title of Ọbaálá ("mighty king" or "senior king"), a title next in rank to the Ọ̀ràngún of Oke-Ila the paramount king. The Ọbaálá is also designated as the automatic regent upon the demise of any reigning Ọ̀ràngún.

== Heritage and diaspora ==
The Ìsèdó clans retain references in their oratures to their ancestry from Ìsẹ̀dó and the ancient Ọ̀bà kingdom, and citing their descent from King Ọba'lúmọ̀ of Ìsẹ̀dó and King Olunlakin of Ọ̀bà as well as nostalgically referring to themselves as "children of the great wealth" of Ọ̀bà.

Other examples of Igbomina and non-Igbomina towns (in Kwara and Ọṣun states of Nigeria) with large concentrations of Ọ̀bà people, now commonly called 'The Ọ̀bà Diaspora', include the following: Oke-Ila Ọrangun, Ila Ọrangun, Ọra-Igbomina, Ipoti-Ekiti, Isanlu-Isin, Oke-Onigbin, Omu-Aran, Rorẹ, Ọyan, Inisha, Ipee, Oke-Ode, Babanla, Ajasẹ-Ipo, Omupo, Esiẹ, Oro, Ijomu-Oro, Iddo-Oro, Idofin, Ado-Eku, Oreke, Sanmora, and Pamo.

The Ìsèdó clans appear to be the earliest surviving [but perhaps not the only] group in 'The Ọ̀bà Diaspora' that purposefully set out and founded a surviving kingdom ruled by the king Ọba'lumọ. Subsequent Ọ̀bà-derivative kingdoms and diasporas appear to have resulted solely from refugee flights from wars and slave raids. Ìsèdó communities resulting from the diaspora of such wars exist in Ipoti-Ekiti, and other Igbomina and Ekiti towns as well as Omido (Kwara State) and other towns in Kwara State.

== Isedo and Oba diaspora tourism ==
The legends of origin and of emigrations of the Isedo from Oba has been a major effort of His Royal Highness, Dr. Olúfẹ́mi Ọládàpọ̀ Babalọlá. He has also been active since 2004 in promoting tourism (heritage tourism/cultural tourism and geo-tourism), and planning tourist expeditions to include the various Isedo and Oba heritage sites which he himself visited, and physiographic features and cultural performances/traditional occupations of the Igbomina-Yoruba and adjoining Yoruba areas. He has led various special tours to the various old sites, ruins and existing towns and historical places of Yorubaland, especially of the Igbomina-Yoruba region, verifying oral history and oral poetry of various clans and ancient kingdoms.
