= Obalumo =

The Obalúmo is a royal personage, a traditional monarch amongst the Igbomina clan of the Yorubas of West Africa. The earliest manifestation of his title dates back to the 12th century at the latest, making him a ruler of relative significance in the intricate chiefly hierarchy of the tribe.

== Prince Oba'lúmọ̀ ==
Ọbalúmọ̀ or Ọba'lúmọ̀ (a contraction of Ọba Olúmọ̀) is the titular name of the founding king of the ancient Ìsèdó-Olúmọ̀ city-state, an ancient monarchy of the Igbomina-Yoruba. Translations of the title Ọba’lúmọ̀—such as “The King” (Oba), “the Lord of Knowledge” (Olúmọ̀), “King of the Lords of Knowledge”, or “King and Lord of Knowledge”—all suggesting a wise king, indicate that this monarch, who is described in oral history as a veteran hunter and warrior, was also a Babalawo (a diviner, healer, and priest of the Ifá oracle). Ọba’lúmọ̀ was a prince of the ancient Ọ̀bà civilization in northeastern Yorubaland and is regarded as one of the earliest founders of the ancient Yoruba kingdoms in southwestern Nigeria.

However, references to Ọba'lúmọ̀’s city-state as Ìsèdó-Olúmọ̀ (or Isedo of Olúmọ̀), and the existence of an Olúmọ̀ royal clan in Oba-Igbomina (located in the Isin Local Government Area of Kwara State, Nigeria)—one of the extant towns named Oba—suggest a different meaning and origin for the name and title of the Ọba'lúmọ̀ of Ìsèdó. It appears that Ọba'lúmọ̀ founded a city-state dominated by people from the Olúmọ̀ clan of Oba origin, and he therefore adopted the title (or was given the title by his new subjects) Ọba'lúmọ̀ in his new kingdom, meaning “the king from the Olúmọ̀ clan”. Other traditions that associate the name with legendary knowledge of herbal remedies and the Ifá oracle appear to reflect a heritage shared by the entire Olúmọ̀ clan and may not be unique to King Ọba'lúmọ̀.

=== Excerpt from the oral records of Ìsèdó-Olúmọ̀ ===
Some oral history accounts ascribe the personal name Tìímọ̀ (pronounced Tì-í-mọ̀) to the first king of Isedo. Other oral history accounts suggest that Tìímọ̀ was simply the reigning Ọba'lúmọ̀ at the time of contact with a migrating group from one of the two factions departing from Ila Yara, whose leader founded Ila Orangun adjacent to Ìsẹ̀dó, the kingdom where Tìímọ̀ was then reigning as Ọba'lúmọ̀.

== Dating the Ìsẹ̀dó-Olúmọ̀ city-state ==
Oral history analyzed in the light of recent archaeological research results (and published works of oral historians, anthropologists and archaeologists of the Arizona State University, USA, and the University of Ibadan, Nigeria, of the Igbomina-Yoruba region's ancient and later settlements suggest that the Ìsèdọ́ City-State commonly known as Ìsẹ̀dó-Olúmọ̀ (i.e. the Olúmọ̀’s Ìsẹ̀dó) was established between the 10th and 12th centuries by Ọ̀bà emigres (led by the said Ọba'lúmọ̀), who fled the internal wranglings within their former kingdom and/or the ongoing conflicts with the neighbouring Nupe to the north of it (It was presumably the same problem of constant fighting with the Nupe that caused the ancient Òwu kingdom, perhaps a contemporary of Ọ̀bà, to relocate further south from their original city-state in this region to establish a new settlement named Orile-Òwu, south of Ile-Ifẹ).

=== Relationship with neighbouring city-states ===
Records of ancient origin ascribe the role of land-grant authority to the Ọba'lúmọ̀, monarch of Ìsẹ̀dó. Some oral historians report that at the request of Oduduwa's fourth son, Fagbamila, nicknamed and later styled Ọ̀ràngún, the region's king Ọba'lúmọ̀ gave land-grants to the later arriving Ọ̀ràngún immigrants at a location sufficiently distant from Ìsẹ̀dó’s location. Another, seemingly more reliable version of the oral history, indicates that the land-grant occurred a few centuries later, when the faction of the younger of two quarreling princes arrived from the Ìlá Yàrà realm in the vicinity of the Ọba'lúmọ̀'s Ìsẹ̀dó kingdom. This younger prince, Arutu Oluokun, founded Ila-Magbon. This new monarchy was forced to move within a short time to establish another settlement at Ìlá-Ogbogbo (or Odò-Ìlá) (meaning Ìlá of the lowlands) which is the settlement that became the modern Ìlá Ọ̀ràngún.

An annual celebration called the Ìmárúgbó (or Òkùnrìn) festival was instituted between the two city-states during which the King Òràngún leaves his palace with his chiefs to pay a day-long homage to the King Ọba'lúmọ in the Ọba'lúmọ̀'s palace. This is partly in symbolic tribute to Ọba'lúmọ̀'s land-grant and his precedence over the Òràgún in the region, and partly in appreciation of Ọba'lúmọ̀'s hosting of the Ọ̀ràngún's elderly mother, who could not continue with the immigrant party to their allocated land. The Ọ̀ràngún's mother subsequently died in the palace of the Ọba'lúmọ̀, and was buried at Ìsẹ̀dó, so the Ọ̀ràngún also visits her grave there.

The older Ọ̀ràngún monarch's faction, departing the Ìlá Yàrà realm, established a new settlement called Igbohun. After a few other re-settlements, the modern Òkè-Ìlá Ọ̀ràngún was founded near the original Igbohun. The Ọbaálá clan of Òkè-Ìlá Ọ̀ràngún, according to their histories which refer to their origin from Ìsẹ̀dó, is actually a segment of the Ìsẹ̀dó royalty which emigrated several centuries ago at the invitation and inducement of the Orangun Apakiimo to join him to found his new kingdom at Igbohun. At Òkè-Ìlá Ọ̀ràngún (as the kingdom was subsequently known), the Ìsẹ̀dó immigrants retained their royal title of Ọba'lúmọ̀ as agreed with Orangun Apakiimo, perhaps maintaining their separateness for some time until they subsequently "federated" or consolidated with the Òkè-Ìlá Ọ̀ràngún kingdom. Within the consolidated Òkè-Ìlá Ọ̀ràngún kingdom hierarchy, the Ọba'lúmọ̀ or Ìsẹ̀dó clan won rights to the additional high title of Ọbaálá (meaning "mighty king" or "senior king") in addition to their royal title of Ọba'lúmọ̀ remaining recognized. This is a significant recognition of the Ọba'lúmọ̀ clan since the Ọbaálá title is next in rank to the Ọ̀ràngún of Òkè-Ìlá (the paramount king of the consolidated city-state), and the holder of the Ọbaálá title automatically becomes high regent on the demise of any reigning Ọ̀ràngún of Òkè-Ìlá, reigning until the next Ọ̀ràngún is installed.

== Current Status of Ìsẹ̀dó and Ọba'lúmọ̀'s modern role ==
The Ọba'lúmọ̀'s original Ìsẹ̀dó city-state has been virtually engulfed by the modern Ìlá Ọ̀ràngún, but the clan has maintained the royal title of Ọba'lúmọ̀ in the traditional establishment. The modern Ọba'lúmọ̀ territory, which is now enclosed within Ìlá Òràngún, has about thirteen various sub-clans (or mega-family) compounds. The Ọba'lúmọ̀ clan at Ila, as with the branch of the clan in Òkè-Ìlá Ọ̀ràngún, has maintained traditions and festivals that go back about ten centuries to the founding of Ìsẹ̀dó, as well as to their original homeland at Ọ̀bà.

== Oba'lumo in consolidated Òkè-Ìlá Ọ̀ràngún ==
In the consolidated Òkè-Ìlá Ọ̀ràngún state, the Ọba'lúmọ̀ title was contemporaneously established coincident with the creation of the new Oke-Ila state resulting from the split in the Ila Yara kingdom at the end of the 15th century. Due to the local crises engendered by the series of wars among the Yoruba in the 19th century, the Ìsẹ̀dó clan did not fill the Ọba'lúmọ̀ title for more than a century (since the last one reigned at their refugee-settlement at Omi Osun), before the current Obalumo was installed on January 17, 2003, at Oke-Ila. The clan's oral historians summarily attribute the long interregnum to a shortfall in the clan's male population (possibly due to the frequent wars and slave raids which necessitated the temporary relocation of the consolidated Oke-Ila kingdom to the Omi Osun) and the consequent dearth of suitable candidates. The clan's oral historians further indicate that there was a shortage of the required retinue of palace servants that were to be dedicated to fulfil the numerous royal restrictions, ritual observances, ritual avoidances, ceremonies and royal ceremonials of the holder of the Ọba'lúmọ̀ title, such as his daily-fresh drinking water (which is traditionally to be gotten at dawn by young women in virtual-nudity wearing only heavy beads around their waists), the ceremonial etiquette for the preparation and serving of the Oba’lúmò’s meals (in absolute silence), and various other ceremonial routines and rituals of the Ìsẹ̀dó royalty.

=== Accounting for the Oba'lumo interregnum in Òkè-Ìlá Ọ̀ràngún ===
However, there are other likely reasons for this long interregnum judging from oral historians accounts of events. One reason may be connected with the internal strife, dissension and conspiracies in the consolidated Òkè-Ìlá Ọ̀ràngún kingdom (possibly caused or exacerbated by the external pressures of military attacks and aggression from the Ibadan in the late 19th century and neighbouring polities (of Ekiti), culminating in the alleged assassination at the war-front, of Páko, the clan's chosen Obaálá (and potential holder of the Ọba'lúmọ̀ royal title) by a treacherous faction of Òkè-Ìlá Ọ̀ràngún troops during the most recent relocation of the consolidated kingdom to Omi-Ọsun. Another reason is an effort to demonstrate allegiance to the paramount king, the Orangun, by focusing resources on rebuilding Orangun's palace and the kingdom at large, subsequent to the relocation back to Oke-Ila from Omi-Osun. In addition, the era of British Colonialism in Western Nigeria was accompanied by the British recognition of only one primary royalty in the cities across Yorubaland. The minor royalties have begun to be restored since Nigerian independence in 1960, especially in the Ijebu and Remo Divisions which arguably have been the most antagonistic to the earlier era of British trade and colonialism.

== The incumbent Oba'lumo in Òkè-Ìlá and Ìlá ==
The Ọba'lúmọ̀ of the Ìsẹ̀dó kingdom at Ìlá Ọ̀ràngún, (monarch of the Ìsẹ̀dó kingdom at its original site which is now almost completely enclosed within the modern Ìlá Òràngún), is Oyèdèjì Àjídé, while the Ọba'lúmọ̀ of the émigré Ìsẹ̀dó-Oke or Ìsẹ̀dó Ori Oke (Isedo of the mountain top) kingdom—monarch of the relocated segment of the original Ìsẹ̀dó kingdom—subsequently consolidated into Òkè-Ìlá Ọ̀ràngún, and also (especially in recent times) referred to as Ọba'lúmọ̀ of Òkè-Ìla since the consolidation, is Olúfẹ́mi Ọládàpọ̀ Babalọlá.

The royal court of the Ìsẹ̀dó realm in Ìlá Òràngún consist of the Ọba'lúmo's 12 or 13 hereditary Ìsẹ̀dó chiefs under His Royal Highness, Oyèdèjì Àjídé, while the royal court of the Ìsẹ̀dó realm in Òkè-Ìlá Ọ̀ràngún consist of presumably a similar number of hereditary Ìsẹ̀dó chiefs under His Royal Highness, Dr. Olúfẹ́mi Ọládàpọ̀ Babalọlá (but only 3 or 4 of which titles are within historical memory of oral records).

=== Integrating the ancient with the modern ===
In modern times, the monarchs of the Ìsẹ̀dó clans of the modern Òkè-Ìlá Ọ̀ràngún and Ìlá Ọ̀ràngún (the two extant Ọba'lúmọ̀ royal titles), work jointly with the two high kings, termed paramounts, the Ọ̀ràngún of Òkè-Ìlá and the Ọ̀ràngún of Ìlá, for the development and traditional governance of their various consolidated realms while maintaining, as much as practicable, their own individual royal traditions, customs and folk practices of their original kingdoms, both earlier at their Ọ̀bà homeland and later at Ìsẹ̀dó.

The Ọba'lúmọ̀ of Ìsẹ̀dó-Oke (Ìsẹ̀dó Realm in Òkè-Ìlá Ọ̀ràngún), Olúfẹ́mi Ọládàpọ̀ Babalọlá has been especially active since 1984 (19 years before his 2003 installation) in documenting the detailed history of the ancient kingdoms of the Igbomina-Yoruba region, especially the ancient Oba civilization, the original Orangun's city state of Ila-Yara, and the subsequent city states of Oke-Ila, Ila and Isedo. Olúfẹ́mi Ọládàpọ̀ Babalọlá has also been active since 2004 in promoting tourism (heritage tourism/cultural tourism and geo-tourism), and planning tourist expeditions to the various heritage sites and physiographic features and cultural performances/traditional occupations of the Igbomina-Yoruba and other Yoruba areas. He has led various special tours to the various old sites, ruins and existing towns and historical places of Yorubaland, especially of the Igbomina-Yoruba region, verifying oral history and oral poetry of various clans and ancient kingdoms.
