= Omi-Osun ruins =

Remains of ancient Oke-Ilá Orangun kingdom settlement

The Omi-Ọṣun ruins are the remains of an ancient settlement of the Òkè-Ìlá Òràngún kingdom, located along the Omi-Ọsun river in southwestern Nigeria. The ruins consist of remnants of ancient walls, potsherds, and other relics. Much of the site complex is currently overgrown with thicket, but large portions are being used as farmland. Efforts have been made since the late 1970s to persuade the paramount ruler and the local population to protect the remaining ruins from destruction by farming activity, building, and road construction. These efforts received an authoritatitive boost when the main advocate of the conservation of the ruins, a geologist/geophysicist with archaeological interests, was installed into the royal dynastic position of the Oba'lumo, which provided him with increased access to the royal councils of the Orangun, the paramount king of the region.

Omi-Ọṣun was a refuge used by the people of Oke-Ila during various wars and raids that necessitated the evacuation of the city of Oke-Ila. Omi-Ọṣun was finally abandoned by the Oke-Ila Orangun kingdom about after the Peace Treaties at the end of the Yoruba wars of the 19th Century permitted the return to a safe Oke-Ila city.

The Omi-Ọṣun ruins are currently of interest to archeologists reconstructing the history of the region's ancient settlements and the development of the Igbomina of north central Yorubaland.
