= William Adetona Ayeni =

Oba Williams Adetona Ayeni (Ariwajoye 1)
- Orangun of Ila Orangun
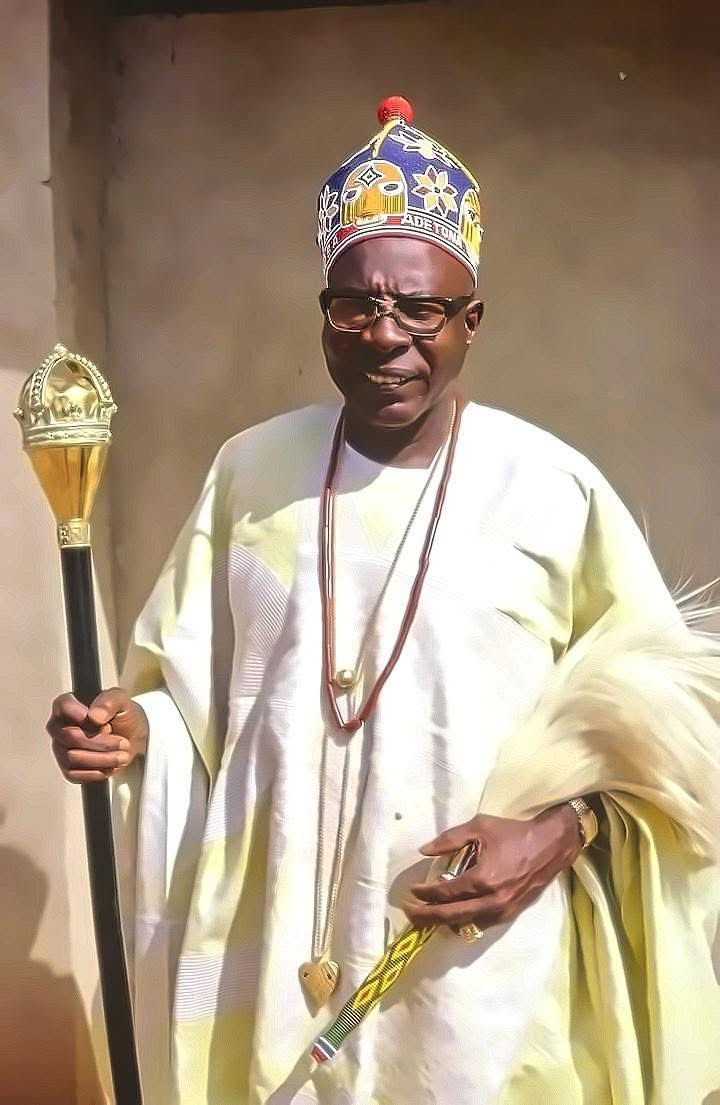
- Oba Williams Adetona Ayeni, Orangun of Ila (1967-1999), with staff of office
- Reign: 13 August 1967 – 2 May 1999
- Coronation: 13 August 1967
- Predecessor: Oba Adedapo Agboluaje II
- Successor: Oba Abdul Wahab Olukayode Oyedotun Bibiire I
- Born: William Adetona Ayeni c. 1912; Ila Orangun, Osun State, Nigeria
- Died: 2 May 1999; Ila Orangun
Regnal name
- Ariwajoye I
- House: Igbonnibi Ruling House
- Dynasty: Yoruba monarchy
- Religion: Christianity
- Occupation: Traditional ruler

Oba William Adetona Ayeni I (Ariwajoye I) (c. 1912 – 2 May 1999) was the Orangun of Ila Orangun, a Yoruba paramount traditional ruler in present-day Osun State, Nigeria. He reigned between 13 August 1967 until his death in 1999, he was reported to be one of the longest-serving monarchs of Ila-Orangun in the 20th century.

== Early life ==
Oba William was born around 1912 into the royal lineage of Igbonnibi Ruling House Ila-Orangun in present-day Osun State, southwestern Nigeria. Before ascending the throne as Orangun, he was actively involved in local governance and politics, serving as a leading opposition figure in the Ila District Council during the colonial period.

== Ascension to the throne ==
Oba William ascended the throne on 13th August 1967 and reigned until his death on 2nd May 1999. He contested the throne with Prince Isaac Adepoju Adebayo, the first Ila graduate and Principal Private Secretary to Chief Ladoke Akintola, Premier of Western Nigeria. Oba William was reportedly the first Christian and literate king to ascend the throne of Orangun.
