= Omupo =

- Town
- Location in Nigeria
- Coordinates: 8°16′29.18″N 4°47′45.14″E
- Country: Nigeria
- State: Kwara State
- LGA: Ifelodun

Government
  - Olomu of Omupo: HRM, Oba Muhammed-Yakub Adebayo Buari (Ilufemiloye II)

Population
  - Ethnicity: Yoruba (Igbomina)
- Time zone: UTC+1 (WAT)
- Website: http://www.kwarastate.gov.ng/ (Kwara State website)

Omupo) (or Omu-Ipo) is a rural Igbomina town in the Ifelodun local government area of south-eastern Kwara State, Nigeria. It is near a fortified archaeological site.

== Location ==
Omupo is 191 miles (308 km) southwest of Abuja, 24 miles (38 km) southeast of Ilorin, 3 miles (4.8 km) northwest of Ajasse Ipo, 10 miles (15.9 km) northeast of Offa, 138 miles (222 km) northeast of Ibadan and 217 miles (350 km) northeast of Lagos.

== History ==
Early settlers migrated from Ife, source of the Yoruba people. The town was founded by Ikuojenrola Adebari Alomole, the surviving son of Ifá priest Awogbola Olomu Aperan. Olomu Aperan was a prince of the Obadio royal family, one of eight autonomous monarchs who met in Ife. He left home during the early 14th century to protest the denial of his request to ascend the throne of Obadio because he had lost most members of his immediate family to an epidemic. Efforts to persuade him not to leave because of his advanced age were fruitless, but he was reminded of the repercussions of his defiance on his burial rites if he died while traveling: his children would have to pay the traditional fees generation after generation, wherever they might settle. However, he left with his supporters. After many years in the wilderness he met Fagbamila Ajagun-nla, the first Orangun of Ila, at Igbo Ajagun-Nla and established a kingdom with him.

== Rulers ==
- Awobimpe - Regent (over 50 years)
- Oba Ladubo - 1728-1788
- Oba Oyewusi Ayinla - 1788-1832
- Oba Makaaye Adungbelogun I - 1832-1858
- Oba Oyelegbin - 1858-1876
- Olomu Ododo - 1876-1887
- Oba Adekanye - 1887-1896
- Oba Muhammad - 1896 (seven months)
- Oba Awerijaye I - 1896-1908
- Oba Adeosun - 1908-1912
- Oba Olomu Aderohumu Oyehanbi - 1914-1939
- Oba Olomu Buhari - 1939-1947
- Oba Afolayan - 1948 (six months)
- Oba Erubola Ajiboye Ajide - 1948-1960
- Oba Abdullahi Alao (Awerijaye II) - 1960-1974
- Oba Jimoh Olarinoye (Makaaye II) - 1974-2009
- Oba Yakubu Adebayo Buari (Ilufemiloye II) - 12 June 2010 - present

Oba Jimoh Olarinoye was born to the royal family of Baba Alabi Oyewale during the reign of Olomu Aderohunmu Oyehanbi (1914–1939). The prince lived in Omupo before he went to Lagos in 1945, and was a businessman there until he was appointed by the Kwara State government to succeed his brother Oba Abdullahi Alao Awerijaiye II in 1974. His reign was peaceful and saw growth and development, including:

- A 1976 electrification project
- A town hall in 1981
- A health center in 1981, upgraded to a cottage hospital by the state government in 1993

Oba Olarinoye died in the early hours of 30 April 2009 at age 94. Four wives, 22 children, many grandchildren and great-grandchildren survived him.

Oba Yakubu Adebayo Buari (Ilufemiloye II) was born in Omupo on 1 January 1952 to the royal lineage of Olomu Mohmmed Suleiman Buari, the twelfth Olomu of Omupo. He had his primary and secondary education in Nigeria and his post-graduate education at the London School of Accountancy in the United Kingdom. He has a Master's of Business Administration (MBA) degree from the University of Ilorin.

== Education ==
Christianity reached Omupo in 1926 through the Igbomina Anglican Diocese. The town's first primary school was established by the Anglican Church in 1942. The Omupo Moslem community built a primary school in 1956, and the Omupo Anglican Grammar School was founded in 1967.

== Projects ==
The following community projects were commissioned:

- Piped water (1961)
- Electricity project (1974)
- Omupo Muslim College (1994)

The Omupo Constituency was created in 1979 for a representative to the Kwara State House of Assembly.

== 2017 Murder Incidence ==
In February 2017, two children were murdered in the town by money ritualists.
