= Omi Osun =

River in Nigeria

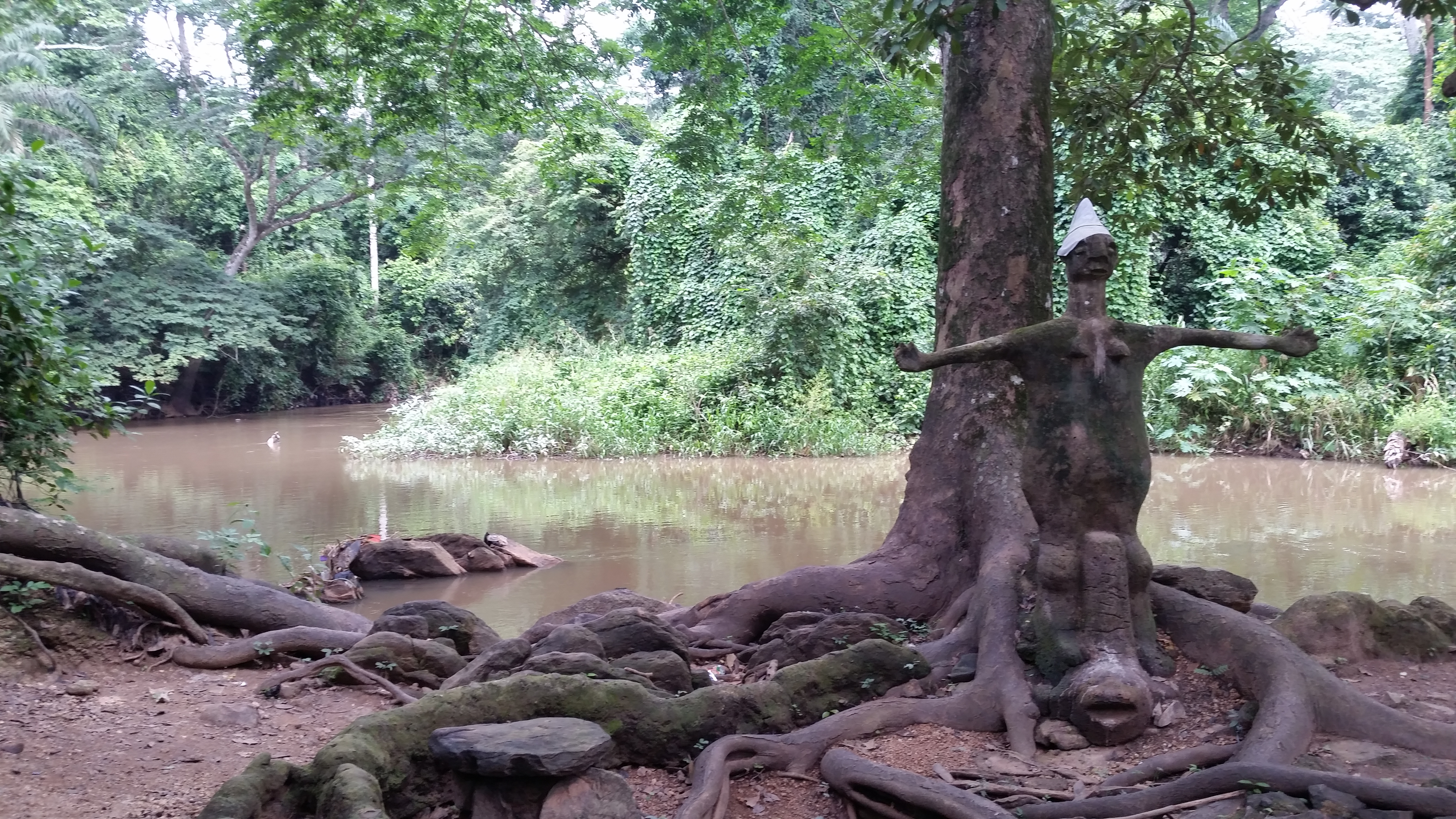
The Water Side of Osun

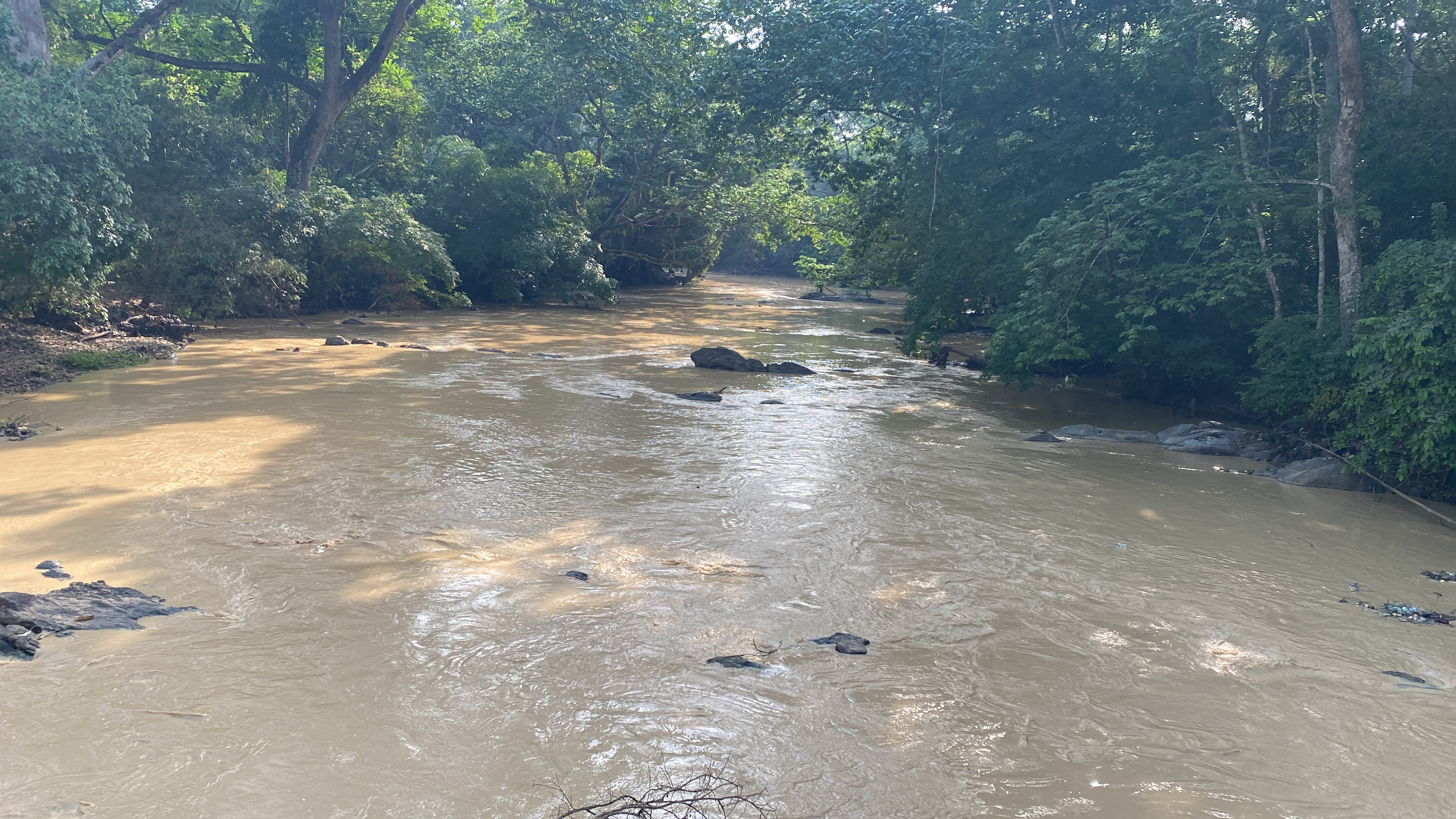
Omi Osun

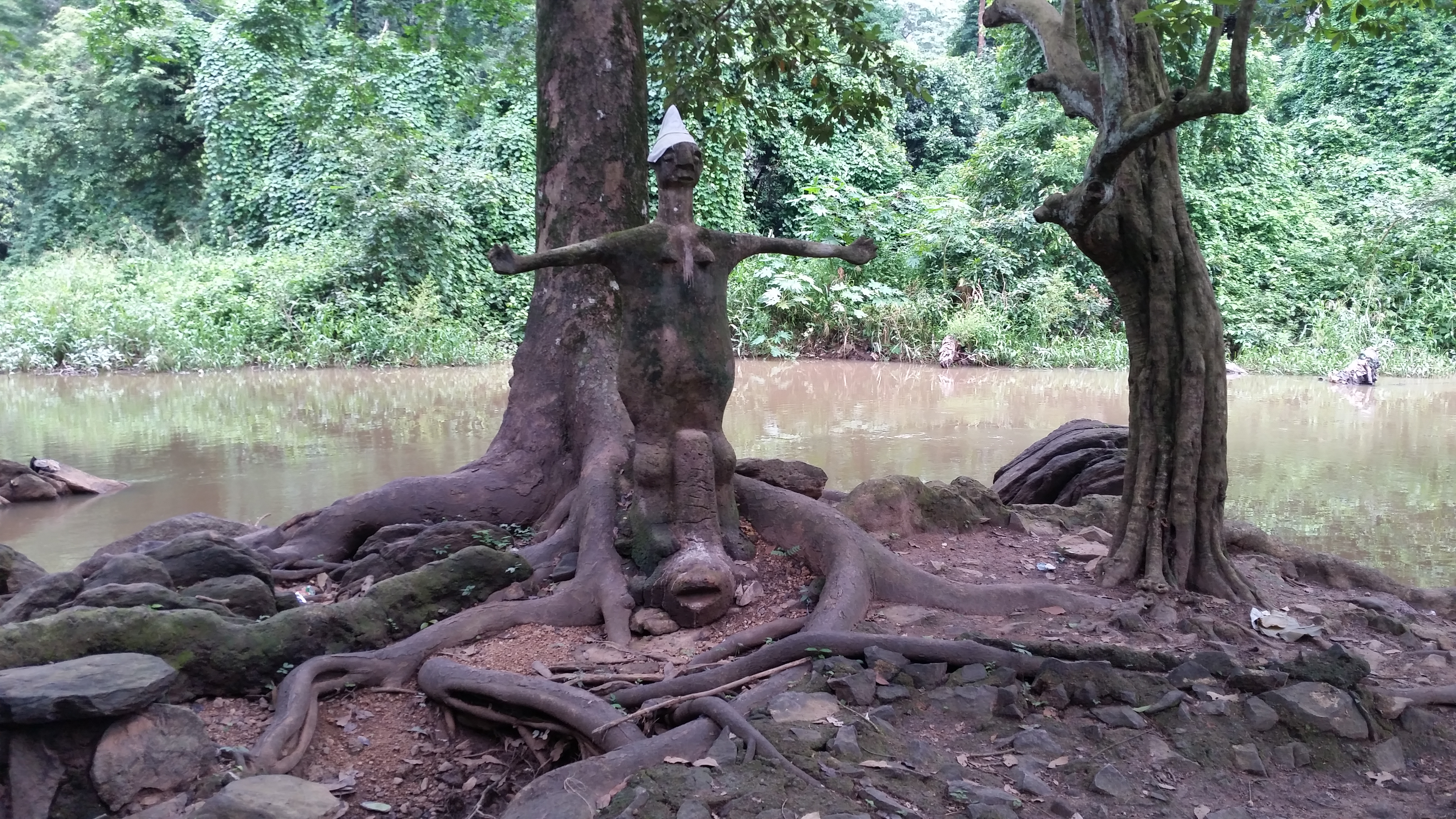
Osun Goddess

Omi-Ọṣun, literally meaning "Ọṣun waters", is the northernmost source tributary of the Ọṣun River in southwestern Nigeria. The Omi-Ọṣun tributary rises from the eastern sector of the Yoruba hills and flows westwards into the Òyì River which subsequently flows southward along two deep gorges within the Oke-Ila quartzite ridges, (adjacent to Oke-Ila Orangun), before its confluence with other rivers to form the main Osun.

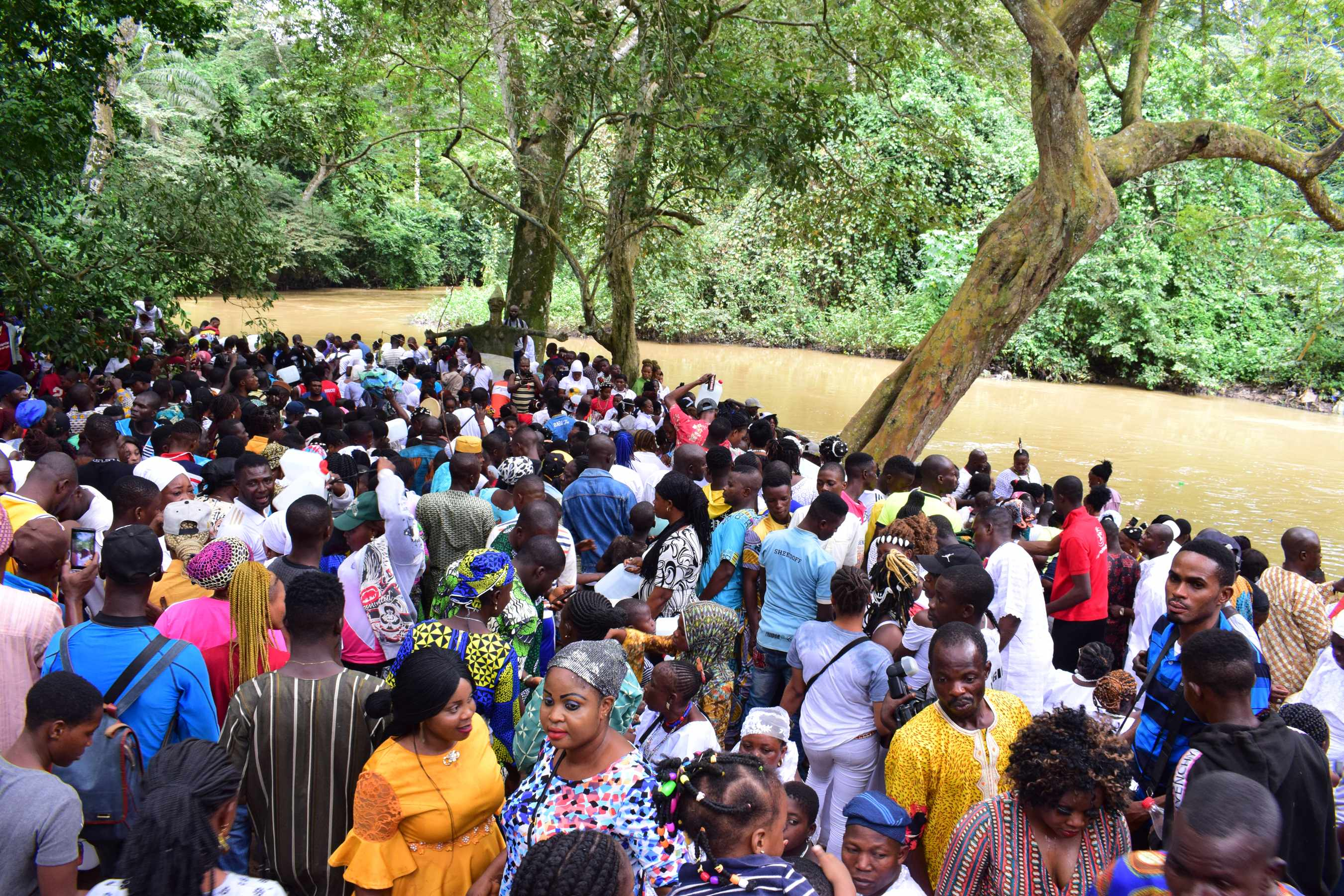
Worshippers at Omi Osun

Ruins of an ancient settlement called Omi-Ọṣun also exists along the Omi-Ọṣun river. This settlement was a former location of the Oke-Ila Orangun kingdom during the migrations of earlier centuries following the departure of the Oke-Ila and Ila factions from their ancient kingdom and mother city of Ila-Yara.

The name Omi-Ọṣun is attributed to the realization that the tributary feeds the Ọṣun River, as well as its subsequent dedication in ancient times to Ọṣun worship.

== Pollution ==
In recent years, the river, which flows across five states in the region before entering the Gulf of Guinea, has been polluted by mining activity from surrounding communities. But no one is sure who, exactly, polluted the water. In Nigeria, artisanal mining is more common. Artisans use light equipment like shovels and focus on alluvial deposits but others, backed by smaller companies, use heavier equipment, including excavators. In Osun, residents pointed out Chinese backers who operated under an atmosphere of secrecy and employed armed security operatives. Across the course of the river and its tributaries, there are several mining sites. But Osun is also home to the only large-scale commercial gold mine in Nigeria. While the Nigerian government at state and federal levels have announced investigations, experts have said that regardless of who is responsible, there will be long-term effects on those who depend on the water for their livelihood and their faith. Water sample tests revealed levels of arsenic and mercury – priority chemical contaminants, according to the World Health Organization (WHO) and Nigerian Industrial Standards (NIS) – were 850 percent and more than 2,000 percent respectively above permissible levels.
