= Adedokun Abolarin =

Oba Adedokun Abolarin
- Born: 24 September 1958 (age 68)
- Citizenship: Nigeria
- Education: University of Ife (now Obafemi Awolow University)
- Occupation: Traditional ruler
- Known for: Philanthropy
- Notable work: Traditional institutions and traditional rulers in national development
- Honours: Education Icon of Year by Vanguard Newspaper in 2024

Adedokun Abolarin (born September 24, 1958) is a Nigerian traditional ruler and a philanthropist. He is the Òràngún of Òkè-Ìlá-Òràngún in Ifedayo Local Government area of Osun State, Nigeria. He was installed as Oba on 8 December 2006. Abolarin was a practicing lawyer before he was installed as a traditional ruler.

== Early life and education ==
Adedokun Abolarin's mother was Mary Ibiteye Abolarin. She was a teacher turned trader. She died in 2024 at the age of 92. Abolarin holds a BSc in Political Science from the University of Ife (now Obafemi Awolowo University), and an MSc in International Relations. He also has LLB, BL (Law).

Abolarin became a lecturer at the old Oyo State College of Arts and Science (OSCAS), Ile-Ife. He later studied law, and rose to become the legal adviser of the then Senate President of Nigeria, Anyim Pius Anyim. His wife, Olori Solape Christianah Abolarin died in June 2025 in a hospital in Ibadan. She was a staff member of the Ministry of Local Government and Chieftaincy Affairs in Osun State.

== Traditional ruler ==
Abolarin became a traditional ruler of Òkè-Ìlá-Òràngún in Ifedayo Local Government area of Osun State, Nigeria in December 2006. Abolarin celebrated agricultural harvest of his community in 2025.

At the Osun Guber, stakeholders renewing commitment to peaceful election process in July 2026, Abolarin enjoined for political tolerance and ideation for improving the standard of living of the people.

During COVID-19 in Nigeria, Abolarin battled and survived COVID-19. He was in the intensive care unit in Osogbo for about eight days then at Babcock for 12 days before he recovered. He stated that COVID-19 is real and urged everyone to take their health seriously with the vaccine.

== Abolarin College ==
Abolarin established Abolarin School in 2014. According to Premium Times Nigeria, the school official website has it that "It is a desire fueled by the desire to ensure that the rights of a child to education irrespective of the social status of the child is met. A child's future should not be determined by where the child is born but by the ability of the child to put into maximum use the talents that God gives. Therefore, every child born into this world should be empowered through effective, functional and quality education." The school admits only indig~~c~~nt children. It was said that after ten years after the establishment of Abolarin College in Oke- Ila, Osun State, it still operates on the "free and quality education for the poor but brilliant students and prospects."

== Awards and honours ==
He was listed as one of the dignitaries invited to grace the Reunion events of the University of Ife Alumni website 2022.

He was honoured with the 2024 Vanguard Newspaper Education Icon of Year by Vanguard Newspaper.

== Publication ==
Abolarin carried out a research on 1914 amalgamation to recent times, in which he evaluated component elements of federal, regional/state, and local government administration. He wrote the work analyzed the Nigerian foreign policy, political parties, and pressure groups.

Traditional institutions and traditional rulers in national development.
