= Oke Ila =

Ancient Nigerian city

Coordinates: 7.955°N 4.986°E

Òkè-Ìlá Òràngún (often abbreviated as Òkè-Ìlá) is an ancient city in southwestern Nigeria that was capital of the middle-age Igbomina-Yoruba city-state of the same name.

Òkè-Ìlá is a city in Ọṣun State, Nigeria. It is situated in the northeastern part of Yorubaland in southwestern Nigeria. Òkè-Ìlá Òràngún’s sister city (and sister kingdom) Ìlá Òràngún is located about 12 kilometres (7 1/2 mi) to the northeast, separated by the north-trending ridges and gorges of the Oke-Ila Quartzites.

Òkè-Ìlá Òràngún is currently capital of the Ifedayo Local Government Area of Ọsun State. The Ifedayo LGA (Local Government Area) Secretariat is located on the northern outskirts of the town. The administration of the two major towns and the several smaller towns and villages is conducted from the Ifedayo LGA Secretariat.

The paramount ruler of the town is Oba (Dr.) Adedokun Abolarin, Òràngún of Òkè-Ìlá (Aroyinkeye 1). He was a lawyer before his installation as the traditional ruler of the town. Abolarin College, one of the prominent schools in the town is owned by him.

== Location ==
Òkè-Ìlá Òràngún is located in Osun State, at an elevation of 568 m (1,863 ft) on one of the several mountains adjoining the eastern flanks of the Oke-Ila Ridge, a part of the Yoruba Hills. Òkè-Ìlá Òràngún is about 190 kilometres (120 mi) directly west of the confluence of the Rivers Niger and Benue at Lokoja and about 45 km (28 mi) northeast of Osogbo, the capital of Osun State. It is about 240 km (150 mi) northeast of Lagos with Ibadan at about midway between. It is about 160 km (100 mi) southeast of the ancient city of Oyo (Oyo-Ile or Old Oyo) and about 130 km (81 mi) east of modern Oyo (Ago d'Oyo). It is 65 km (40 mi) northeast of the ancient city of Ile-Ife, about 95 km (60 mi) southeast of the ancient Yoruba city of Ilorin and about 190 km (120 mi) northwest of Benin City (more correctly Bini or Ibini) capital of the Kingdom of Benin.

== Ila-Yara period ==
=== Original unified city-state at Ila-Yara ===
Before a dispute and split several centuries ago, the present Òkè-Ìlá Òràngún and Ìlá Òràngún constituted the original united kingdom centered on Ìlá-Yàrà, a city-state founded, according to legend, by Oduduwa's fourth son (according to legend), named Fagbamila and nicknamed Òràngún.

The dispute, said to be a succession dispute in one account, or a relocation site dispute by another account, centered on two brother-princes (Àpàkíìmò and Arútú Olúòkun) and their supporters, and led to a split of the Ila-Yara city-state and the eventual emigration of both factions from the Ila-Yara site.

=== Factional histories since Ila-Yara ===
Oral history of Òkè-Ìlá Òràngún kingdom claims, that the dispute arose from the selection of a new site to move the kingdom to. Unfortunately, the Ifa oracle acknowledged as suitable both soil samples from the site selected by the Ìlá-Yàrà kingdom's official delegates commissioned by Prince Àpàkíìmò, as well as the site selected by the unofficial delegates commissioned by the kingdom's youth led by Àpàkíìmò's brother, Prince Arútú Olúòkun.

The kingdom's royal council insisted on the site selected by the kingdom's official delegates while the young people argued the advantages of the site selected by the delegates they commissioned. The younger prince, Arútú Olúòkun's faction led a migration of his faction out of Ìlá-Yàrà and founded Ìlá-Magbon. Thereafter, (according to oral history of Òkè-Ìlá Òràngún kingdom), the official Ìlá-Yàrà kingdom under the "de jure" Òràngún Àpàkíìmò, migrated to their preferred site. The faction of the prince, Àpàkíìmò at Ìlá-Yàrà, founded Igbóhùn, is the modern Òkè-Ìlá Òràngún.

Oral history states that when earthworm pests subsequently bothered Prince Arútú faction's settlement at Ila-Magbon, Prince Arútú Olúòkun elected to "sink into the ground", because he was no longer able to travel when told by the Ifa oracle that they had to move to the Ila-Odo site which is the location of the modern Ìlá Òràngún, where the "Òrèrè" staff was first stuck into the ground. Oral history of Òkè-Ìlá Òràngún kingdom also claims, that Òfínní, an Òràngún deposed from the Òràngún Àpàkíìmò;'s kingdom at Igbóhùn was the first Òràngún officially installed by the youth's faction after their exit from Ìlá-Yàra

== Migrations ==
=== Relocations ===
Since the migration from Ìlá-Yàrà, the Òkè-Ìlá Òràngún kingdom had settled at various locations, the most notable being Igbohun (the original name and site of the city-state), Okiri, Iladun, Omi-Ọsun (along the Omi-Ọsun river, a source of the Osun River), and the present site (Oke-Ila), which oral history claims is partly superimposed on, and contiguous with, the original Igbohun site, and reputedly has twice been previously occupied and abandoned.

=== Refugee settlements ===
The original population of the Òkè-Ìlá Òràngún kingdom has over the centuries been joined by waves of migrations from other parts of Yorubaland, as well as refugees of various conflicts in the near and distant parts of Igbominaland. An example of additions to the original population are the Ọba'lúmọ̀ of Ìsèdó group who were also of the earlier Òbà diaspora.

Oral history gives examples of historical refugees that were hosted by the Òkè-Ìlá Òràngún kingdom in separate quarters or wards, but have subsequently returned to their homelands, such as the Rore (or Irore), the Arandun and the Ora-Igbomina kingdoms.

It is conceivable that the Òkè-Ìlá Òràngún kingdom itself had similarly been temporary guests as war-refugees of their neighbour-kingdoms, just like their sister-kingdom Ìlá Òràngún was for 15 years a refugee-kingdom at Omupo during the 19th century wars with the Ibadan empire, in which Oke-Ila and other Igbomina kingdoms were part of the "Ekiti Parapo" alliance with the Ijesha, fighting off the "tyranny" of Ibadan's "ajele" system of tribute-tax apportionment and collection.

=== Wars and slave raids ===
Both the domestic/internal African Slave Trade and the "export" oriented Trans-Atlantic Slave Trade adversely impacted the Oke-Ila Orangun Kingdom. Although various Òkè-Ìlá Òràngún oral-historians claim (like most Yoruba cities and kingdom) never to have been vanquished or captured for enslavement, snippets of clan-histories and kingdom-histories reveal that the Òkè-Ìlá Òràngún kingdom was bothered for a significant part of its history by slave-raids and attacks from its neighbours. During the reign of one of her kings, the Orangun himself was a "king-in-exile" and a "refugee" for 40 years in the Oro kingdom (now in Kwara State) - a complex of nine consolidated settlements several kilometres northwest of his Oke-Ila Orangun kingdom. The return of this Orangun to the Omi-Osun area near the devastated old capital, gave him the nickname "Ayunrobo" - one who went to Oro and made it back.

=== Immigrants profile ===
The newer waves of migrations that stayed on in Òkè-Ìlá Òràngún can usually be identified from their traditional orature verses which usually make nostalgic references to their original homeland. Apart from the Isedo quarter/ward of Oke-Ila, the Iranyin quarter/ward is also an identifiable immigrant group that consolidated with the Oke-Ila Orangun kingdom. It is not yet ascertained if the Alapinni quarter of Oke-Ila Orangun are secondary immigrants from Oyo or direct immigrants from the then adjoining Nupe territories as were the Alapinni clan of the old Oyo Empire. The Aworo clan is said by oral-historians to be from Ekiti while orature citation of parts of the clan make references to Oyo as origin. The relationship of the Elemona clan to the Yoruba kingdom of Ilemona (west of Oke-Ila), is yet speculative until corroborated from their clan orature-verses. Similarly is the possible connection of the Obajoko title of the Iranyin clan to the Yoruba kingdom of Iranyin west of Oke-Ila.

== Culture ==
=== Population and culture ===
Òkè-Ìlá Òràngún has a population estimated (2005) to be 35,000 (suspected to be an under-estimation).

The people of Òkè-Ìlá Òràngún kingdom speak a distinctive dialect of the Yoruba language called Igbomina (or Ogbonna). The people are mostly agrarian but have a significant number of artisans, traders, hunters of wild game, school-teachers, and other professionals.

Òkè-Ìlá Òràngún is famous for the energetic dancing and acrobatic skills of its Elewe, the region's primary Egungun, a dancing masquerade ensemble representing the ancestors during various traditional festivals. The Egungun Elewe is unique to the Igbomina Yoruba subgroup. There are other less popular but unique and peculiar Egungun in the kingdom.

=== Natural physiographic features and tourist sites ===
Òkè-Ìlá Òràngún is known for the Ayikun-nugba Waterfalls (also spelt Ayikunnugba Waterfalls) situated in a cliffed gorge, and its associated caves with "mythical" underground passages. The Ayikun-nugba falls are located southwest of the town, along the north-trending ridge-and-gorge series of the Oke-Ila Ridge complex.

A second waterfall, the Omi-Ogan Waterfalls is located in the valley off the northern road into the town at the bottom of very steep slopes. The waterfall flows down two main mounds and collects into a pool at the bottom, feeding the westward flowing river the Omi-Ogan River.

Another tourist site is the Oke Lanfo Peak located southeast of Òkè-Ìlá Òràngún, from the top of which a panoramic view of the surrounding towns within 50 kilometers can be seen. The ridges and gorges consist of the geologically defined Oke-Ila Quartzites, a series of metamorphic rocks about 550 million years old.

== Modern history ==
=== Orangun Samuel Adeyemi, Arojojoye III ===
From Nigeria's independent take-off at the end of her colonial era under the British, Oba Samuel Adeyemi, Arojojoye reigned as Orangun, the Paramount King of Oke-Ila from 1969 until he "joined the ancestors" in November 2005. This ancient and historic Yoruba kingdom recorded several "firsts" during Orangun Adeyemi's reign, among which are the tarring of the link-road joining the city to the inter-state road at Asanlu junction, the inauguration of the premier community-sponsored secondary school -the Oke-Ila Grammar School (an alumnus of which rose to become in 2007 a full professor), the establishment of pipe-borne water supply, the electrification of the city, the designation of the city as capital of the new local government, and the construction of the local government headquarters in the city. Orangun Samuel Adeyemi led the kingdom of Oke-Ila Orangun into the third millennium before he joined his ancestors.

=== Orangun Adedokun Abolarin, Aroyinkeye I ===
Soon after the turn of the millennium, the current Orangun of Oke-Ila Orangun in Ifedayo Local Government area of Osun State, Oba Adedokun Abolarin was installed on December 8, 2006. Oba Adedokun Abolarin is from the Obasolo Ruling House, one of the three ruling houses among which the title rotates in Oke-Ila Orangun.

The new Òràngún of Òkè-Ìlá, Oba Adedokun Abolarin is a highly educated professional, holding a law degree, after a master's degree in International Relations, following a bachelor's degree in Political Science, all from Obafemi Awolowo University (formerly University of Ife). Until his installation, the new Òràngún of Òkè-Ìlá, Oba Adedokun Abolarin, a professional lawyer licensed to practice law in the Supreme Court of Nigeria, was the principal partner of Dokun Abolarin & Co., a firm of Solicitors and Legal Consultants, which had served as Company Secretary to various corporations among whom are Tell Publications (Publishers of Tell Magazine), Pacific Holdings, Peachtree Communications Ltd, Sportsmark International and Springtime Development Foundation.

Oba Adedokun Abolarin is an academic authority on Nigerian government and politics having researched and written on the period from the 1914 amalgamation to recent times, in which he evaluated component elements of federal, regional/state, and local government administration, analyzed Nigerian foreign policy, political parties and pressure groups.

As is traditional among the Yoruba for a new king or monarch, Oba Adedokun Abolarin chose at his installation the “reign name” Aroyinkeye I, translating as “one who finds honey to tend the title”. Citizens of this ancient Igbomina-Yoruba kingdom across Nigeria, and especially Europe and the Americas often express their thrill and excitement at the prospect of the development which the well-educated king promises for the city and its satellite towns.

== Climate ==
The climate of Ila Orangun is a tropical savanna.the average temperature is between 23 °C (74 °F) and 28 °C (82 °F). About 1481 mm (58.3 inches) of precipitation falls on average each year. Ila Orangun generally experiences the most precipitation in June, August and September, with an average of 25 wet days and 233 mm (9.2 inches) of precipitation per month. January, February, and December are the dry season months in Ila Orangun. During these months, the average amount of precipitation is 8 mm (0.3 inches).

== Political rulers ==
=== Immigrant dynasties ===
Oke-Ila Orangun has a couple of historical minor kings (or royals) under the Orangun of Oke-Ila. These are kings of the wards/quarters (townships or sub-towns) of Oke-Ila that consolidated as immigrant communities in the last five centuries of Oke-Ila history, as early as at its foundation subsequent to the exodus from Ila-Yara. These Realm/Ward/Township Royalties retain varying degrees of royal privileges and perform their ancient royal traditions, which in Yoruba tradition is to be exercised in their clan's territory within the consolidated kingdom. However overriding royal power is retained over the entire kingdom by the Orangun who is paramount king over the entire kingdom.

The "Ward/Township King" of the Ìsèdó-Oke group is titled Ọba'lúmọ. The Ìsèdó-Oke group was the earliest (and possibly the largest single group) to join with the then Orangun Apakiimo to found his new kingdom (now called Oke-Ila) towards the end of the 15th century, about 1490 AD. The "Realm/Ward/Township royal" of the Iranyin group is titled "Obanla" but the position has not been filled in living memory. The role of the Obanla seems to have been taken up by (or given to) the Obajoko in the modern Royal Council of the Oke-Ila Orangun kingdom. The Iranyin group seem to be a more recent "consolidant" with Orangun's kingdom at Oke-Ila relative to the Isedo group.

=== The "Crowned Heads/Crownly Heads" Caucus & incumbents ===
In the traditional royal council of Oke-Ila, both "ward/township kings" are constituted with other royal clans - the heads of the Orangun ruling houses, into the Oriade ("Crowned Heads/Crownly Heads") - a "royal heritage caucus" of the "senate" or superior royal council.

==== "Minor kings" (of ancient immigrant wards/quarters) ====
The Ọba'lúmọ̀ of Ìsèdó-Oke ward/township is Olúfẹ́mi Ọládàpọ̀ Babalọlá. Oral historians state that Iranyin ward/township also has the royal title of "Obanla", but the highest ranking title-holder from the Iranyin ward is the Obajoko of Iranyin ward/township. (The "Obanla" title also exists in Ila Orangun). It is not clear if any other clan in Oke-Ila has maintained substantial relics of royal privileges. It seems that such clans would presumably be represented in the "Arewa" senate, except if removed or proscribed for some reason in historical times (before the British colonial period). However, a few other clans have maintained symbolic noble privileges.

==== Orangun Dynasty - ruling house heads ====
The heads of the Orangun ruling houses that are part of this "royal heritage caucus" of the "senate of ten" - (Arewa) are the Obasolo: Prince Adeoti Adesoji and the Elemoogun: Prince Adeyemi Olatunde.

== Educational and religious institutions ==
Òkè-Ìlá Òràngún has several primary and secondary schools most of which are privately owned. The premier secondary institution is the Òkè-Ìlá Òràngún Grammar School. The first primary schools are the Seventh-day Adventist Day School situated at the foot of a peak on the west edge of the city, and the Baptist Day School situated at the foot of the mountain on which the old city is located.

The Seventh-day Adventist Church of Nigeria and the Baptist Church (Nigerian Baptist Convention) were the first churches to be established in the city. Both denominations now have multiple churches in the city. Other churches include the Church of Nigeria (Anglican Communion), the Apostolic Church, the Christ Apostolic Church, the Cherubim & Seraphim Church, the Aladura Church of the Lord, and many others. The city has a central masjid and other minor mosques where Muslims worship. The percentage of adherents of traditional religions is decreasing but there are worshipers of the major Yoruba traditional religions like Sango, Ogun, and Egungun.

Òkè-Ìlá Òràngún's town hall adjoins the palace of the Òràngún, the paramount king of the kingdom. It is named Apakiimo Town Hall, in honor of the last king of the unified kingdom who led the final exodus from Ila-Yara, capital city of the original unified kingdom that subsequently became the sister kingdoms of Òkè-Ìlá Òràngún and Ìlá Òràngún.
