= Sarah Lam =

British-Chinese actress

Sarah Lam is a British-Chinese actress known for UK television roles.

== Career ==
She played Susannah in the sitcom No Problem!, Linda Mo in Angels, Anna Lee in Howards' Way and Caroline Choi in Brookside. Other TV credits include Two Thousand Acres of Sky, Q.E.D., The Chinese Detective, C.A.T.S. Eyes, A Very Peculiar Practice, The Adventure Game, To Be the Best, Virtual Murder, Sherlock, Inspector Morse, The Bill and Holby City.

Lam has recently been involved in the production The World of Extreme Happiness at the National Theatre.

In 2015, Lam appeared in an episode of Casualty. She also appeared in The Secret Diary of Adrian Mole as a nurse and the 80s cult show The Adventure Game.

Lam appeared in Paradise, Kae Tempest's new all-female version of Sophocles' play Philoctetes, Postponed from 2020, it was directed by Ian Rickson with Lesley Sharp as the title character.

== Filmography ==
=== Film ===
Year	Title	Role	Notes
1980	The Wildcats of St Trinian's	Chinese Girl	
1986	Shanghai Surprise	China Doll's Maid	
1986	Captive	Sister	
1987	Tropic of Ice	Louise	
1996	Hamlet	Attendant to Gertrude	
1998	China Dream	Wang Liyun	
2020	Richard II	Various roles	Filmed state play
2025	Fight or Flight	Mae	

=== Television ===
Year	Television	Role	Notes
1980–1982	Angels	Linda Mo / Jenny	57 episodes
1981	The Chinese Detective	Mei	Episode: "Release"
1982	Q.E.D.	Priscilla	Episode: "The Limehouse Connection"
1982	The Magnificent One	Soo-Neo	Television film
1983	No Problem!	Susannah	8 episodes
1985	The Secret of the Black Dragon	Naomi	2 episodes
1985	C.A.T.S. Eyes	Min	Episode: "The Double Dutch Deal"
1985	The Secret Diary of Adrian Mole	Chinese Nurse	Episode #1.5
1986	The Adventure Game	Dorgan	6 episodes
1986	A Very Peculiar Practice	Chinese Girl	Episode: "A Very Long Way from Anywhere"
1987	Howards' Way	Anna Lee	12 episodes
1987	Teresa	Teresa	Television film
1989	Brookside	Caroline Choi	14 episodes
1991	Performance	Lady Nijo / Win	Episode: "Top Girls"
1992	To Be the Best	Ming	Television film
1992	Virtual Murder	Liang Ti	Episode: "Dreams Imagic"
1992–2010	Casualty	Various roles	3 episodes
1994	Frank Stubbs Promotes	Mai	Episode: "Chinatown"
1995	Waiting	Dr. Anna Chen	Television film
1997–2000	The Bill	Various roles	3 episodes
1998	Inspector Morse	Susan Ho	Episode: "The Wench Is Dead"
2000	Life Force	Sally Cheung	
2001–2003	Two Thousand Acres of Sky	Ida Macasaet	8 episodes
2004, 2010	Holby City	Lin Lo / Joan Wells	3 episodes
2010	Sherlock	Opera Singer	Episode: "The Blind Banker"
2018	Stan Lee's Lucky Man	Madame Cheung	6 episodes
2019	I Am...	Sally	Episode: "I Am Hannah"
2021	Back to Life	Laura	4 episodes
2023	Call the Midwife	Mrs Yu	Series 12, Episode 8
2024	Dune: Prophecy	Hagal Truthsayer	Episode: "Sisterhood Above All"

=== Video games ===
Year	Title	Role
2021	Hitman 3	Various voices
2022	Total War: Warhammer III	Voice
