= Ila Yara =

Ila-Yara, also known as Ila-Iyara, was the original kingdom founded about the 12th century by Ajagun-nla, also nicknamed "Orangun", a legendary grandson of Oduduwa. The kingdom split into two after Orangun Apakiimo was installed (as the 6th Orangun) towards the end of the 15th century. A young prince Arutu, who lost the contest for the Orangun throne, led a rebellion and exodus of his supporters, and founded the Ila, Nigeria kingdom further northward (near the Isedo kingdom of Obalumo, while Orangun Apakiimo soon evacuated Ila Yara to found the Oke-Ila kingdom further eastward (after attracting other polities including a segment of the Isedo kingdom). Both kings of the Oke-Ila and Ila kingdoms are titled "Orangun".
