= Ora-Igbomina =

Ora-Igbomina is an ancient Igbomina town in Ifedayo Local Government Area, Osun State, Nigeria. With Oke-Ila Orangun, it constitutes the two major towns in the local government area. The conjoining boundary town among Osun, Ekiti and Kwara States, this historical town was the first town to accept Christianity, and invariably Western education in Igbominaland. Christianity was brought to Ora in 1895 by CMS missionaries led by a "son of the soil" - a returnee from the slave trade named Pa Olasehinde. St. Stephen Anglican Church was established in 1895. The first primary school in Igbominaland - stretching from present-day Osun to Kwara States - St. Stephen's Anglican Primary School was established in 1912. Ora is referred to as "The Cradle of Education and Christianity in Igbomina Land, and by extension to parts of Moba Division of present-day Ekiti State and also in the whole of the old Osun North East Division of the old Western Region, which covers almost half of the present Osun State.

== Traditional rulership ==
Ora-Igbomina has two beaded monarchs, the Asa'Ooni of Ora-Igbomina and the Akesin of Ora-Igbomina, whose palaces stand a short distance from each other.

In December 2024 the Government of Osun State approved the appointment of Oba Johnson Adekanmi Abikoye as the Asa'Ooni of Ora-Igbomina, following the death of Oba Tinuoye Atolagbe in November 2023.
