= No Problem! (TV series) =

British TV sitcom (1983–1985)

- Genre: Comedy
- Created by: Black Theatre Co-operative
- Written by: Farrukh Dhondy; Mustapha Matura
- Directed by: Nic Phillips
- Starring: Victor Romero Evans; Malcolm Frederick; Judith Jacob; Janet Kay; Sarah Lam; Shope Shodeinde; Chris Tummings; Angela Wynter
- Country of origin: United Kingdom
- Original language: English
- No. of series: 3
- No. of episodes: 27

Production
- Executive producer: Humphrey Barclay
- Producer: Charlie Hanson
- Production location: London
- Running time: 30 minutes
- Production company: London Weekend Television

Original release
- Network: Channel 4
- Release: 7 January 1983 – 1 June 1985

No Problem! is a Channel 4 sitcom that ran from 7 January 1983 to 1 June 1985, created by the Black Theatre Co-operative. The show was written by Farrukh Dhondy and Mustapha Matura from the Black Theatre Co-operative, with the first episode produced in September 1982. Twenty-seven episodes were broadcast of the programme, which focused on a family of Jamaican heritage, the Powells, living in a council house in Willesden Green, London. It was voted Britain's 100th best sitcom in a poll carried out by the BBC.

== Synopsis ==
No Problem! was the first sitcom to be broadcast on Britain's new Channel 4 TV station. It was also the first comedy series specifically to address the lifestyle of the British black community. The show's producers made a conscious decision to focus on comedy rather than "race issues", which drew some criticism. Writing for the BFI website Screenonline, critic Mark Duguid said:

The 1980s saw television moving with the times and beginning to respond, albeit awkwardly, to calls for greater sophistication in black representations. No Problem! (ITV, 1983–85) drew its cast and creators from the Black Theatre Co-operative, and concerned the teenage and twenty-something Powell kids, left to fend for themselves in a Willesden council house after their parents have returned to Jamaica. But the accent was on comedy, not politics, and the show quickly alienated some black activists, who objected to the narrow roles allotted to its female characters, to its casual jokes at the expense of Asians (ironic given its Asian co-writers, Farukh Dhondy and Mustapha Matura), and even to the scenario itself, which, in the words of cultural critic Paul Gilroy, put "voluntary repatriation at the heart of the situation".

== Cast ==
- Bellamy: Victor Romero Evans
- Beast: Malcolm Frederick
- Sensimilia: Judith Jacob
- Angel: Janet Kay
- Susannah: Sarah Lam
- Terri: Shope Shodeinde
- Toshiba: Chris Tummings
- Melba: Angela Wynter
- Director/producer: Micky Dolenz of The Monkees
