= Ifedayo =

- LGA
- Interactive map of Ifedayo
- Location in Nigeria
- Coordinates: 7°57′N 4°59′E
- Country: Nigeria
- State: Osun State
- Headquarter: Oke Ila Orangun

Government
  - Chairman: Abiodun Samuel Idowu

Area
  - Total: 128 km^{2} (49 sq mi)

Population (2006 census)
  - Total: 37,058
  - Density: 290/km^{2} (750/sq mi)
- Time zone: UTC+1 (WAT)
- 3-digit postal code prefix: 234
- ISO 3166 code: NG.OS.IF

Ifedayo is one of the 30 local government areas of Osun State in southwestern Nigeria. It is one of the most recent local government areas to be created. The current chairman of the council is Abiodun Samuel Idowu.

Its headquarters are in the town of Oke-Ila Orangun.

It has an area of 128 km^{2} and a population of 37,058 at the 2006 census.

The postal code of the area is 234.

The people of Ifedayo consist of the Igbomina (or Ogbonna) sub-ethnic group of the Yoruba. There are several other small towns and villages in the local government area, most of which lie west of Oke-Ila Orangun. The Igbomina are known for their industriousness, strong communal ties, and historical connection to Ile-Ife, the cradle of the Yoruba civilization. Linguistically, they speak a distinctive dialect of Yoruba characterized by unique tonal patterns and proverbs. Historically, the Igbomina were among the frontier Yoruba groups that played vital roles in trade and cultural exchange between the Ife, Oyo, Ekiti, and Ijebu subgroups.

Ifedayo, created from the former Oke-Ila District under Oyo State (before Osun State's creation), has its administrative headquarters in Oke-Ila Orangun. The local government area is not only the seat of traditional authority but also home to thriving agriculture, education initiatives, and growing tourism potential centered around the cultural heritage of the Igbomina people.

== Ifedayo Area Council ==
Ifedayo Area Council was created out of Ifedayo for administrative convenience, better development planning and to bring government closer to the grassroot. The LCDA is created by the Government of Osun State and is responsible for the funding of the council. The LCDA is headed by a chairman, vice chairman and other executive and legislative branches similar to the federally recognized local councils. Azeez Musibau O. is the current chairman of the council.

== Traditional Institution ==
Notable paramount rulers in Ifedayo Local Government include; The Asa-Ooni of Ora Igbomina, HRM Oba Adekanmi Abikoye; The Orangun of Oke-Ila, HRM Oba Adedokun Omoniyi Abolarin; and The Akesin of Ora-Igbomina, Oba Samuel Oladoye Idowu.

== Tourism ==
Ayinkunugba Waterfalls is located in Oke-Ila Orangun Ifedayo local government. The waterfalls is over 80 m (260 ft) high and it is the opposite of Olumirin Waterfall where you climb to appreciate it, but in Ayinkunugba, people will descend to discover the wonderful work of nature that is the landscape of mountains, caves and trees.

Ayinkunugba Waterfalls was discovered by a hunter who shot a strange animal called Kunugba. The shot animal rolled down and the hunter searched but could not find it, instead, discovered waterfalls and named it: Ayinkunugba (Where an animal Nugba, rolled and died).

== Notable indigenes ==
- (Professor) Olusola Adeyeye – former senator for Osun Central Senatorial District in the Upper Chamber of National Assembly, Abuja.
- (Hon.) Idowu Samuel Abiodun – the managing director, Centre Point Hotel, Osogbo and annex in Oke-Ila Orangun, current chairman of Ifedayo LGA. Oke-Ila Orangun.
- (Surv.) T.J. Atolagbe – (Retired) Permanent Secretary, Osun State Government and the Asaooni of Ora Kingdom.
- (Chief) David Adeyeye Osundina – Asiwaju of Oke-Ila Orangun and first elected chairman of Ifedayo Local Government, Oke-Ila Orangun.
- (Omooba) 'Kunle Ayantoye – former CEO of Lepec Shipping Limited, Lagos and the immediate past chairman of Ifedayo LGA, Oke-Ila Orangun.
