= Judith Jacobs =

American politician (1939–2016)

Presiding Officer of the Nassau County Legislature
- In office 2000–2007

Member of the Nassau County Legislature for the 16th Legislative District
- In office 1996–2016

Personal details
- Born: January 13, 1939 New York City, New York, US
- Died: September 13, 2016 (aged 77) Manhasset, New York
- Party: Democratic
- Spouse: Sid
- Children: 3

Judith "Judy" Jacobs (January 13, 1939 – September 13, 2016) was the presiding officer of the Nassau County Legislature. In her fifth term as a legislator, Jacobs represented legislative district 16, which includes: Woodbury; Jericho; Plainview; Old Westbury; Roslyn Heights; and parts of Syosset; Old Bethpage; and Roslyn Estates. Her district in the past also included Bethpage, Cove Neck, East Norwich, Jericho, Laurel Hollow, Muttontown, Oyster Bay, Oyster Bay Cove, Plainview, Syosset, and Woodbury. She was elected to the newly formed legislature in 1995, and was chair or vice-chair of a number of committees: rules and procedures; planning, development and the environment; legislative budget review; and government services and operations. She was also minority leader of the legislature from March to December 1999.

A former teacher in the Elmont school district, Jacobs received her B.A. degree from Hunter College, where she also did graduate work. She was politically active for more than thirty years, including a campaign to close the Old Bethpage landfill. She ran for a Town Council seat in the Town of Oyster Bay, New York, twice in 1977 and 1993, losing both times. She was also the Democratic Leader for the Town of Oyster Bay for years. She was a trustee at Syosset Hospital and a member of the Syosset Chamber of Commerce. She was also a member of other community organizations, including the Women's American ORT and the North Shore Synagogue. She was selected to the 2002 class of the "Top 50 Women in Long Island" by the Long Island Business News.

Jacobs focused on quality of life and child care issues, and was active in breast cancer awareness efforts. She was a resident of Woodbury for thirty-nine years, and had three children and six grandchildren. She was known around her district as "Grandma Ju Ju". She died in Manhasset, New York, on September 13, 2016, after a fall at her home. She had been diagnosed with myelodysplastic syndrome four months prior and had been weakened by the effects of the disease.

On December 5, 2016, the Plainview-Old Bethpage Board of Education voted to rename the Parkway Elementary School as the Judy Jacobs Parkway Elementary School in her honor.
