= Nitrobeat =

British theatre company

- Formerly: Black Theatre Co-operative (Black Theatre-Co-op)
- Company type: Theatre company
- Industry: Arts & Entertainment
- Founded: 1979; 47 years ago
- Founder: Mustapha Matura, Charlie Hanson
- Headquarters: United Kingdom
- Website: nitrobeat.co.uk

Nitrobeat is a British theatre company. Founded in 1979 as the Black Theatre Co-operative by the playwright Mustapha Matura and the director Charlie Hanson, it was renamed Nitro in 1999. "Black Theatre Co-operative have been producing black theatre for longer than any other black company in Europe, and their existence has been significant to the careers of many of Britain's renowned black actors, actresses and playwrights."

== History ==
The Black Theatre Co-operative's first production was of Mustapha Matura's play Welcome Home Jacko, which was staged in May 1979 at "The Factory", a disused building in Paddington renovated for the company's use. The production was later revived in New York and the company has performed in South Korea, the Netherlands and Germany as well as touring extensively across the UK. In the 1980s, the company wrote the television sitcom No Problem!, starring Judith Jacob and Chris Tummings. In collaboration with the Nottingham Playhouse, the company's 1997 adaptation of Ray Shell's novel Iced toured nationally, and had a sell-out run at the Tricycle Theatre.

In 1999, the company was renamed as Nitro.

The company's artistic directors have included Felix Cross, Joan Ann Maynard and current director Diane Morgan. Early performers with the company included the actor Trevor Laird.

Nitrobeat has been a resident company at London's Soho Theatre since 2015.

== See also ==
- Dark and Light Theatre Company
- Talawa Theatre Company
