= Ila Orangun =

- Town
- Location within Nigeria
- Coordinates: 8°1′N 4°54′E
- Country: Nigeria
- State: Osun State
- LGA: Ila

Government
- Time zone: UTC+1 (WAT)

Ìlá Òràngún (or Ila) is an ancient city in Osun State, Nigeria, that was the capital of an ancient city-state of the same name in the Igbomina area of Yorubaland in south-western Nigeria. Ìlá Òràngún is more populous than its sister-city, Òkè-Ìlá Òràngún, a town located about 7.5 miles (12 km) to the northeastern corner of Osun State. The latitude and longitude coordinates of Ila Orangun are 8.019116 and 4.901962 respectively. According to the information obtained from GeoNames geographical database, the population of Ila Orangun in Osun State, Nigeria is 179,192.

It is the headquarters of the Ila Local Government Area. In addition to Ila Orangun, other towns and villages in Ila Local Government Area include Abalagemo, Aba Ododo, Ajaba, Alagbede, Ayetoro Obaaro, Edemosi, Ejigbo-Orangun, Igbo Eso, Oyi Ayegunle and so on. There are as much as over 200 compounds in the ancient city. The traditional ruler of the town is known as Orangun.

The people of Ila speak the distinctive dialect of the Yoruba language called Igbomina (or Igbonna). A common traditional profession of the indigenes of the town is palm-wine tapping. This profession is referenced in one of the most popular songs and common sayings about the town of Ila. The proverb Ila 'o l'oogun, emu l'oogun Ila means "Ila has no special medicine or magical preparations other than palm-wine". A folk song also says Ila ni mi, ise mi o le/ti mo ba wa l'orun ope bi 'ofusia' ni i ri, which translates into English as "I am a citizen of Ila, my profession is very easy; if I am on top of a palm tree, I feel like I am upstairs in a multi-storey building."

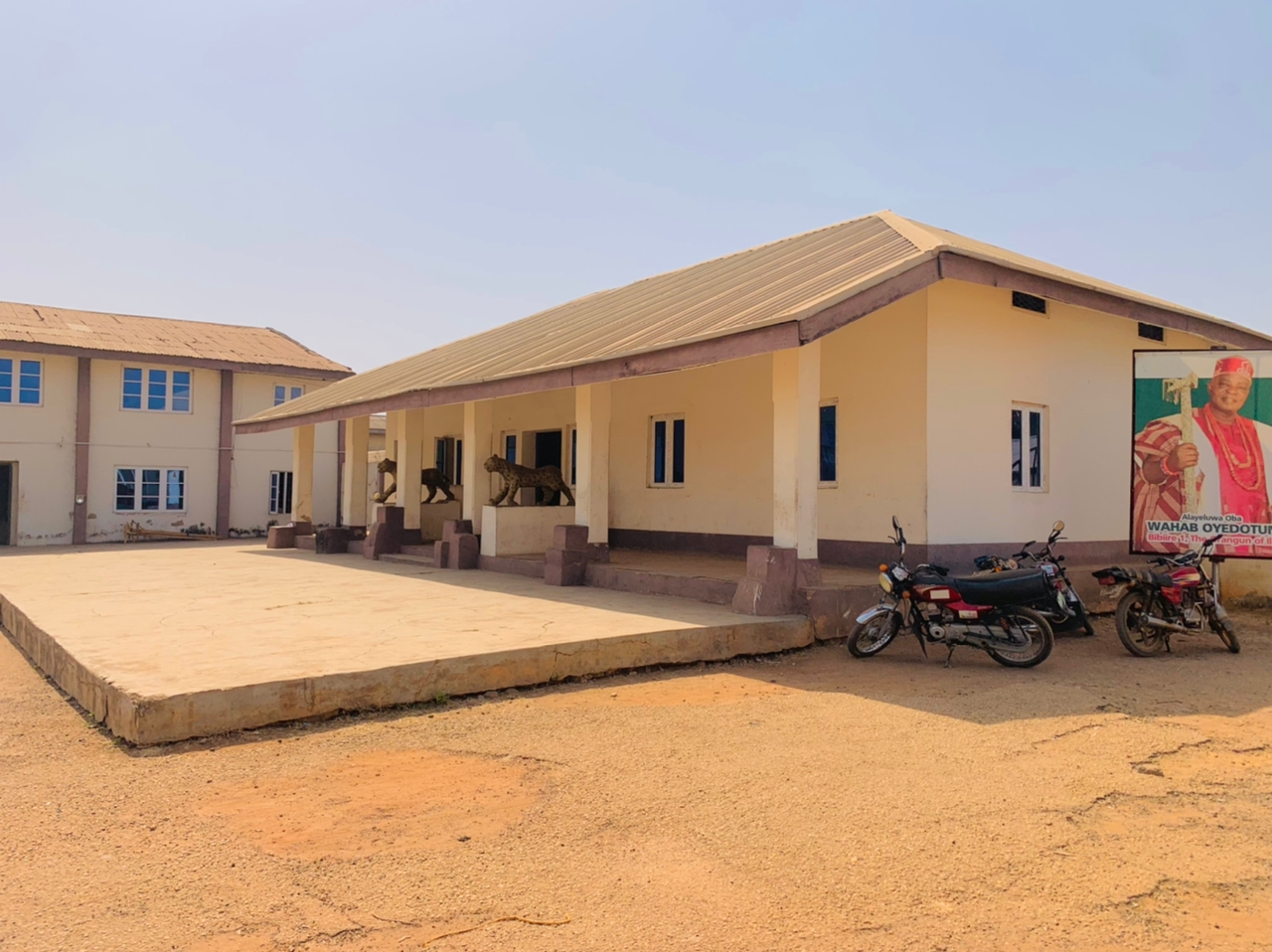
Orangun Palace - Ila Eekun

Ila-Orangun is the home of the Osun state College of Education, The Police Training College and Federal University of Health Sciences] The African Heritage Research Library was established in 1988.

The ancient town also has a Mobile Police Training School The name of the present Orangun (King) of Ila Orangun is Oba Abdul Wahab Olukayode Oyedotun Bibiire I.

== Notable people ==
- Adebisi Akande, former Osun state Governor,
- Tafa Balogun, former IGP Nigeria

== Climate ==
The rainy season in Ila Orangun is humid, oppressive, and cloudy, whereas the dry season is hot, muggy, and partially cloudy. The average annual temperature ranges from 63 °F to 91 °F, with lows and highs of 56 °F and 97 °F being extremely rare.

Oral history of Ila-orogun in Igbomina dialect by Professor Rasheed Adeyinka a native speaker
