= Orangun =

Title of the paramount ruler

The Ọ̀ràngún or Ọ̀ràngún of Ìlá is the title of the paramount ruler of one of the ancient Igbomina kingdoms, a sub group of the Yoruba people with its seat and capital located in Ila Orangun, central Yorubaland, presently in southwestern Nigeria.

The origin of the title can be traced to the mythology of a history of Oduduwa, the progenitor of Yoruba race whose child birth was not forthcoming as a king that was in dire need of an heir to the throne.

History has it that he was one of the seven grandchildren of Odùduwà specifically, the fourth child in the roll of children. He inherited numerous crowns and beads from the father. He left Ile-Ife to found his own land with Àdá-Ògbó (a machete like tool that was used to clear bush paths while they were sojourning) and Ọ̀pá Ọ̀rẹ̀rẹ̀ ( A royal symbolic staff). It had been foretold that wherever the staff is firstly placed consciously or by a mistake, would be their settlement and that was how they settled at their first abode, Ìlá-Kòló.

== History ==
According to Yoruba oral history, the first Òràngún was the first grandson of Odùduwà, the mythical ancestor of the Yoruba, who was king at Ile-Ife in ancient times. Odùduwà’s first grandson, the oldest son of Oduduwa's only son Okanbi, was named Fagbamila and nicknamed Òràngún. The nickname is a contraction of Ọ̀ràn mí gún, meaning "my situation is perfect", although an alternative but implausible etymology exists.

Odùduwà is said to have given a crown to each of his grandsons (some accounts say 16) and sent them off to found their own kingdoms.

The first Òràngún was given a massive, curved cutlass called "Ogbo" by Odùduwà to clear his way in the forest but the main purpose of the "Ogbo" gift was the inherent power to lead the young prince to a suitable place to settle down and establish his own kingdom. This "Ogbo" is claimed by oral historians. as the source of the name "Igbomina" (from "Ogbo mi mo ona" or "Ogbo mo ona", a statement attributed to the original Òràngún, meaning "My Ogbo knows the way", or "The Ogbo knows the way"), which the Yoruba sub-ethnic of northeastern Yorubaland (of Òsun and Kwara States of Nigeria) are called.

This translation of Ogbo is only one interpretation; in standardized Yoruba, Ogbo in fact means Long Life, or Senior citizen, depending on where the accents are. Ada, is the yoruba word for cutlass, Ogbo mi mo ona would correctly translate to "My elder shows me the road".

== Orangun of Ila and Oke Ila ==
In Ila Orangun, the historical capital of the Igbomina kingdom and Ila Local Government area of Osun State, the current Orangun is Oba Wahab Kayode Adedeji Oyedotun who succeeded Oba William Adetona Ayeni. He was crowned in 2003 following a five year long dispute between the princes eligiblefor the throne.

In Oke-Ila Orangun, a breakaway town and capital of Ifedayo, the current Orangun is Oba Adedokun Omoniyi Abolarin, of the Obasolo Ruling House, one of the four ruling houses among which the title rotates in Oke-Ila Orangun. He was installed on December 8, 2006.

For the first time in more than three centuries, the two Orangun reigning in both Oke-Ila and Ila are descendants of Arutu Oluokun, the younger prince who led the exodus of the youth from the united kingdom at Ila Yara about 500 years ago.
