= Ila, Osun State =

City in Osun state, Nigeria

Ila
- LGA
- Interactive map of Ila
- Location in Nigeria
- Coordinates: 8°01′N 4°54′E
- Country: Nigeria
- State: Osun State
- Headquarter: Ila Orangun

Government
  - Chairman: Adeyemi Adebara A

Area
  - Total: 303 km^{2} (117 sq mi)

Population (2006 census)
  - Total: 62,049
  - Density: 205/km^{2} (530/sq mi)
- Time zone: UTC+1 (WAT)
- 3-digit postal code prefix: 233
- ISO 3166 code: NG.OS.IL

Ila is a local government area in Osun State, Nigeria. Its headquarters are in the town of Ila Orangun. The current chairman of the council is Adeyemi Adebara A.

It has an area of 303 km^{2} and a population of 62,049 at the 2006 census.

The postal code of the area is 234.

== Ila Central Local Council Development Area (LCDA) ==
Ila Central Local Council Development Area (LCDA) was created out of Ila area council for administrative convenience, better development planning and to bring government closer to the grassroot. The LCDA is created by the Government of Osun State and is responsible for the funding of the council. The LCDA is headed by a chairman, vice chairman and other executive and legislative branches similar to the federally recognized local councils. Ademola Kolawole is the current chairman of the LCDA.
